= List of highways numbered 164 =

The following highways are numbered 164:

== Canada ==
- Prince Edward Island Route 164

== Costa Rica ==
- National Route 164

== India ==
- State Highway 164 (Tamil Nadu)

== Japan ==
- Japan National Route 164

== United Kingdom ==
- A164 road
- B164 road

== United States ==
- Interstate 164 (former)
- U.S. Route 164 (former)
- Alabama State Route 164
- Arizona State Route 164 (former)
- Arkansas Highway 164
  - Arkansas Highway 164 Spur
- California State Route 164
- Connecticut Route 164
- Florida State Road 164 (former)
- Georgia State Route 164
- Illinois Route 164
- Indiana State Road 164
- Kentucky Route 164
- Louisiana Highway 164
- Maine State Route 164
- M-164 (Michigan highway) (former)
- Missouri Route 164
- Nevada State Route 164
- New Jersey Route 164 (former)
- New York State Route 164
- Ohio State Route 164
- Oklahoma State Highway 164
- Oregon Route 164
- Pennsylvania Route 164
- South Carolina Highway 164
- Tennessee State Route 164
- Texas State Highway 164
  - Texas State Highway Spur 164
- Utah State Route 164
- Virginia State Route 164
- Washington State Route 164
- Wisconsin Highway 164

Territories

- Puerto Rico Highway 164

Preceded by 163	Lists of highways 164	Succeeded by 165
