= Texas State Highway 275 =

State highway in Texas

State Highway 275
- Harborside Drive
- SH 275, highlighted in red

Route information
- Maintained by TxDOT
- Length: 6.225 mi (10.018 km)
- Existed: 1993–present

Major junctions
- West end: I-45 in Galveston
- East end: SH 87 in Galveston

Location
- Country: United States
- State: Texas

Highway system
- Highways in Texas; Interstate; US; State; Former; Toll; Loops; Spurs; FM/RM; Park; Rec
← SH 274	→ SH 276

State Highway 275 (SH 275) is a Texas state highway running along the northern side of Galveston Island from Interstate 45 to SH 87.

== Route description ==
SH 275 begins at a junction with I-45 in Galveston. It initially heads north, but turns towards the east as it heads through Galveston. SH 275 reaches its eastern terminus at a junction with SH 87 in Galveston. The highway is also known as Harborside Drive.

== History ==
SH 275 was originally designated on August 1, 1938 on a route from Mabelle to Jimtown. This was cancelled on November 24, 1941. The current route was designated on February 23, 1993.

== Major junctions ==
The entire route is in Galveston, Galveston County.

mi	km	Destinations	Notes
0.000	0.000	I-45	I-45 exit 1C
6.225	10.018	SH 87	
1.000 mi = 1.609 km; 1.000 km = 0.621 mi
