= List of state highways in Texas =

- Texas State Highway markers

Highway names
- Interstates: Interstate X (I-X); Interstate Highway X (IH-X)
- US Highways: U.S. Highway X (US X)
- State: State Highway X (SH X)
- Loops: Loop X
- Spurs: Spur X
- Recreational: Recreational Road X (RE X)
- Farm or Ranch to Market Roads: Farm to Market Road X (FM X); Ranch to Market Road X (RM X)
- Park Roads: Park Road X (PR X)
- War Highways: War Highway X (WH X)

System links
- Highways in Texas; Interstate; US; State; Former; Toll; Loops; Spurs; FM/RM; Park; Rec

State highways in Texas are owned and maintained by the U.S. state of Texas, through the Texas Department of Transportation (TxDOT).

The Texas State Highway system was established in 1917 to create a structured network of roads that would enhance connectivity and support economic development across the state. The initial system included 22 state highways, many of which followed pre-existing trails and trade routes. Over the years, the system has expanded significantly, reflecting the growth and changing needs of Texas.

As of 2021, the total length of the 246 currently in-service highways with unique assigned numbers is 14,092.7 miles (22,680.0 km).

== List ==
Number	Length (mi)	Length (km)	Southern or western terminus	Northern or eastern terminus	Formed	Removed	Notes
SH 1	—	—	State line at El Paso, Texas	State line at Texarkana, Texas	1917	1952	Much of route became US 67 and US 80 (now IH 10, IH 20 and IH 30) in 1939; remaining section in Dallas became Loop 260
SH 2	—	—	—	—	1917	1939	Became US 81
SH 3	—	—	—	—	1917	1952	Became SH 97 and US 90 Alt.
SH 3	30.42	48.96	I-45 / SH 6 / SH 146 in La Marque	I-45 in Houston	1952	current	
SH 4	24.45	39.35	Fed. 180 in Matamoros, Tamaulipas (Mexico)	Boca Chica State Park	1917	current	
SH 5	—	—	—	—	1917	1944	Not built; temporary route became SH 354
SH 5	30	48	FM 2786 in Fairview	US 75 in Howe	1959	current	Former US 75
SH 6	476.38	766.66	I-45 / SH 3 / SH 146 in La Marque	SH-6 north of Quanah	1917	current	
SH 7	212.67	342.26	I-35 in Bruceville-Eddy	Future I-69/US 84 in Joaquin	1917	current	
SH 8	41.40	66.63	SH 155 in Linden	AR 41 north of New Boston	1917	current	
SH 9	—	—	—	—	1917	1971	Became I-37
SH 9	3.20	5.15	I-14/US 190 in Copperas Cove	FM 116 in Copperas Cove	2014	current	A portion of the proposed Copperas Cove Loop, opened February 2014
SH 10	—	—	—	—	1917	1960	Became SH 99 (now US 377)
SH 10	8.60	13.84	I-820 / SH 121 / SH 121 in Fort Worth	SH 183 in Euless	1979	current	Former routing of SH 183
SH 11	153.16	246.49	SH 56 in Sherman	Future I-369/US 59 in Linden	1917	current	
SH 12	—	—	—	—	1917	1939	Became US 59
SH 12	19.57	31.49	I-10 in Vidor	LA 12 at Deweyville	1959	current	Former SH 235
SH 13	—	—	—	—	1917	1939	Became US 66 (now I-40)
SH 14	60.15	96.80	I-45 at Richland	SH 6 south of Bremond	1917	current	
SH 15	—	—	—	—	1917	1943	Became US 180
SH 15	125.15	201.41	US 54 at Stratford	SH-15 (OK) east of Follett	1955	current	Former SH 117
SH 16	—	—	—	—	1917	1919	Became SH 40 (now US 77 and US 377)
SH 16	541.82	871.97	US 83 in Zapata	US 281 south of Wichita Falls	1923	current	Longest state highway in Texas
SH 17	92.12	148.25	BL I-20 in Pecos	US 67 / US 90 in Marfa	1917	current	
SH 18	—	—	—	—	1917	1947	Became SH 70
SH 18	83.49	134.36	NM 18 north of Kermit	BL I-10 / US 285 in Fort Stockton	1958	current	
SH 19	186.66	300.40	I-45 in Huntsville	Bus. US 82 / Bus. US 271 in Paris	1917	current	
SH 20	—	—	—	—	1917	1951	Became US 290
SH 20	78.06	125.63	I-10 in McNary	NM 478 in Anthony, N.M.	1969	current	Former US 80 and SH 1
SH 21	312.50	502.92	SH 80 in San Marcos	LA 6 east of San Augustine	1917	current	
SH 22	111.22	178.99	SH 36 in Hamilton	SH 31 in Corsicana	1917	current	
SH 23	—	—	—	—	1917	1939	Became US 283 (now US 377, US 183, US 283 and SH 6)
SH 23	28.70	46.19	US 83 in Lipscomb County	SH-23 (OK) north of Booker	1959	current	Officially designated as FM 1265 until 1990
SH 24	33.16	53.37	I-30 / US 67 near Campbell	Bus. US 82 / Bus. US 271 in Paris	1917	current	
SH 25	59.95	96.48	US 281 at Windthorst	Red River north of Electra	1917	current	
SH 26	—	—	—	—	1917	1962	Became US 259
SH 26	18.55	29.85	SH 183 in Haltom City	SH 121 in Grapevine	1980	current	
SH 27	39.05	62.84	I-10 near Mountain Home	I-10 at Comfort	1917	current	
SH 28	—	—	—	—	1917	1939	Became US 70 and US 183
SH 29	142.62	229.52	US 83 near Menard	SH 95 near Taylor	1917	current	
SH 30	—	—	—	—	1917	1939	Became US 277
SH 30	53.16	85.55	Bus. SH 6 in College Station	SH 19 in Huntsville	1960	current	Former SH 45
SH 31	149.81	241.10	US 84 near Waco	US 80 in Longview	1917	current	
SH 32	—	—	—	—	1917	1939	Became US 75 (now I-45)
SH 32	9.8	15.8	I-69E/US 77/US 83 in Brownsville	SH 4 in Brownsville	proposed	—	Proposed southern loop of Brownsville
SH 33	—	—	—	—	1917	1939	Former SH 13, became US 60 and US 54
SH 33	22.78	36.66	US 60 south of Canadian	SH-33 (OK) in Hemphill County	1955	current	Former SH 170
SH 34	130.32	209.73	I-35E / near Italy	US 82 FM 100 in Honey Grover	1917	current	
SH 35	207.14	333.36	I-37 / US 181 near Corpus Christi	I-45 in Houston	1917	current	
SH 36	—	—	—	—	1917	1917	became part of SH 18
SH 36	343.10	552.17	Bus. US 83 at Abilene	SH 288 in Freeport	1918	current	
SH 37	92.29	148.53	SH-37 (OK) north of Albion	US 69 in Mineola	1918	current	
SH 38	—	—	—	—	1918	1923	Became SH 34
SH 38	—	—	—	—	1923	1924	Became SH 8
SH 38	—	—	—	—	1930	1939	Became SH 6
SH 39	—	—	—	—	1919	1931	Became SH 24
SH 39	—	—	—	—	1931	1935	Never built; mileage swapped with current route
SH 39	35.36	56.91	US 83 in Real County	SH 27 in Ingram	1936	current	
SH 40	—	—	—	—	1919	1939	Became US 69, US 175, and US 77
SH 40	3.01	4.84	FM 2154 in College Station	SH 6 in College Station	1994	current	
SH 41	50.53	81.32	US 377 near Rocksprings	I-10 near Mountain Home	1919	current	
SH 42	—	—	—	—	1919	1939	Became US 69
SH 42	35.13	56.54	US 80 in White Oak	US 79 south of Price	1962	current	Former SH 259
SH 43	—	—	—	—	1919	1923	Became SH 11, SH 26, SH 43A and SH 66
SH 43	85.76	138.02	Future I-369/US 59 in Atlanta	US 79 / US 259 / SH 64 in Henderson	1923	current	
SH 44	128.85	207.36	US 83 west of Encinal	SH 358 in Corpus Christi	1919	current	
SH 45	—	—	—	—	1919	1960	Became SH 30
SH 45	15.37	24.74	RM 1826 in Austin I-35 in Austin RM 620 in Austin	FM 1626 in Manchaca SH 130 in Austin SH 130 in Austin	1985	current	
SH 46	71.39	114.89	SH 16 west of Boerne	SH 123 in Seguin	1919	current	
SH 47	—	—	—	—	1923	1939	Former SH 1A and SH 1C, became SH 11
SH 47	7.15	11.51	SH 21 in Bryan	FM 60 in College Station	1987	current	
SH 48	—	—	—	—	1923	1931	Former SH 1A, became SH 47 (now SH 11)
SH 48	22.27	35.84	Bus. US 77 / US 281 in Brownsville	SH 100	1931	current	
SH 49	60.84	97.91	US 271 in Mount Pleasant	LA 2 east of Gray	1923	current	Former SH 35
SH 50	—	—	—	—	1923	1939	Former SH 2, became US 380
SH 50	11.68	18.80	SH 34 in Ladonia	SH 24 near Commerce	1965	current	
SH 51	—	—	—	—	1923	1932	Former SH 28, became part of SH 16
SH 51	—	—	—	—	1932	1959	Became US 385
SH 51	5.76	9.27	SH 207 in Hansford County	FM 281 / FM 760 in Hansford County	1974	current	
SH 52	—	—	—	—	1923	1945	Former SH 13, became SH 203
SH 53	—	—	—	—	1923	1930	Former SH 18, became SH 24 and SH 137 (now US 62)
SH 53	26.84	43.19	SH 36 in Temple	US 77 in Rosebud	1930	current	Former SH 108A
SH 54	54.93	88.40	US 62 / US 180 in Culberson County	I-10 / US 90 in Van Horn	1923	current	Former SH 12
SH 55	99.39	159.95	US 277 in Edwards County	US 83 in Uvalde	1923	current	Former SH 4 and SH 3E
SH 56	—	—	—	—	1923	1939	Former SH 5D, became US 54
SH 56	64.47	103.75	US 82 in Whitesboro	US 82 in Honey Grove	1974	current	Former US 82
SH 57	—	—	—	—	1923	1934	Former SH 12, became SH 35
SH 57	—	—	—	—	1966	1971	Former SH 76, became US 57
SH 57	1.47	2.37	SH 155 in Tyler	FM 2493 in Tyler	1994	current	
SH 58	—	—	—	—	1923	1934	Former SH 19A, became SH 38 (now SH 6) and SH 35
SH 58	1.83	2.95	I-20 in Midland	Spur 268 / Bus. SH 158 in Midland	2009	2011	Became BS 158-B (now SH 140)
SH 59	—	—	—	—	1923	1928	Former SH 19B; cancelled in exchange for extending SH 57 and rerouting SH 58
SH 59	56.18	90.41	US 82 in St. Jo	US 281 / US 380 / SH 114 / SH 199 in Jacksboro	1929	current	
SH 60	69.95	112.57	SH 36 in Wallis	FM 2031 in Matagorda	1923	current	Former SH 12C
SH 61	21.43	34.49	US 90 at Devers	Anahuac	1923	current	Former SH 35A
SH 62	29.17	46.94	US 96 at Buna	SH 73 near Bridge City	1923	current	Former SH 8B
SH 63	61.73	99.34	US 69 in Zavalla	LA 8 east of Burkeville	1923	current	Former SH 7
SH 64	82.18	132.26	US 80 in Wills Point	US 79 / US 259 / SH 43 in Henderson	1923	current	Former SH 15A
SH 65	—	—	—	—	1923	1939	Former SH 11, became US 271
SH 65	15.50	24.94	SH 61 near Anahuac	SH 124 in Stowell	1961	current	Former SH 73-T
SH 66	—	—	—	—	1923	1931	Former SH 37 and SH 43, became SH 37
SH 66	—	—	—	—	1931	1939	Became US 281 and US 281 Spur (now Spur 241)
SH 66	34.97	56.28	SH 78 in Garland	US 69 / US 380 in Greenville	1961	current	Former FM 7 and US 67
SH 67	30.78	49.54	US 380 / SH 16 in Graham	US 180 in Breckenridge	1923	current	Former SH 18, SH 22, and SH 2; portions now SH 6
SH 68	—	—	—	—	1923	1942	Former SH 10A, became FM 8
SH 68	19.9	32.0	I-69C/US 281 in Edinburg	I-2/US 83 in Donna	proposed	—	Proposed (designated 2013) Hidalgo Loop
SH 69	—	—	—	—	1923	1939	Former SH 36A, became US 190
SH 69	—	—	—	—	1971	1992	Former SH 6, renumbered to SH 112 due to theft of signs
SH 70	315.89	508.38	US 277 south of Blackwell	US 83 south of Perryton	1923	current	Former SH 4
SH 71	253.20	407.49	US 87 / US 377 near Brady	SH 35 in Blessing	1923	current	Former SH 3D and SH 3A
SH 72	111.73	179.81	SH 97 near Fowlerton	US 77 / US 183 in Cuero	1923	current	Former SH 3B
SH 73	42.02	67.62	I-10 in Winnie	I-10 near Orange	1923	current	Former SH 3A
SH 74	—	—	—	—	1923	1951	Former SH 36B, became US 183; old alignment to Georgetown redesignated as SH 195
SH 74	5.3	8.5	SH 360 near DFW Airport	SH 161 near DFW Airport	proposed	—	Proposed (designated 1995) to run across DFW Airport
SH 75	—	—	—	—	1923	1939	Former SH 13A, became US 66 (now I-40)
SH 75	132.63	213.45	I-45 in Streetman	I-45 in Conroe	1987	current	Former US 75
SH 76	—	—	—	—	1923	1932	Former SH 22, replaced by SH 7
SH 76	—	—	—	—	1932	1966	Transferred to SH 57 (now US 57)
SH 77	46.82	75.35	US 259 west of Naples	LA 1 east of Smyrna	1923	current	Former SH 1B
SH 78	90.83	146.18	I-30 in Dallas	SH-78 (OK) at Sowell's Bluff Bridge	1923	current	Former SH 5C
SH 79	96.20	154.82	US 183/ US 283 north of Throckmorton	SH-79 (OK)	1923	current	Former SH 22
SH 80	93.30	150.15	I-35 in San Marcos	SH 123 in Karnes City	1923	current	Former SH 29A
SH 81	—	—	—	—	1923	1939	Former SH 29B and SH 27, became SH 16
SH 81	—	—	—	—	1939	1939	Former SH "F" (old SH 16), cancelled when completed; became FM 734 (now SH 71) in 1947
SH 81	23.35	37.58	I-35 in Hillsboro	I-35W in Grandview	1991	current	Former US 81
SH 82	—	—	—	—	1923	1958	Former SH 17; redesignated SH 18
SH 82	13.01	20.94	SH 73 in Port Arthur	LA 82 in Jefferson County	1975	current	
SH 83	—	—	—	—	1923	1935	Former SH 18B, transferred to SH 15 (now US 180)
SH 83	56.07	90.24	NM 132 west of Denver City	SH 137 in Welch	1955	current	
SH 84	—	—	—	—	1923	1939	Former SH 39, replaced by US 380
SH 84	8.0	12.9	FM 1472 in Laredo	I-35 in Laredo	proposed	—	Designated May 2023
SH 85	76.93	123.81	US 83 at Carrizo Springs	SH 97 in Charlotte	1923	current	
SH 86	149.37	240.39	US 60 in Bovina	US 287 in Estelline	1923	current	Former SH 5A
SH 87	228.49	367.72	Future I-69 / US 59 / US 84 in Timpson	I-45 in Galveston	1923	current	Former SH 8A
SH 88	—	—	—	—	1923	1938	Former SH 33B, replaced by SH 18 (now SH 70)
SH 89	—	—	—	—	1923	1929	Former SH 2; removed from system; became SH 353 (now SH 174) in 1946
SH 89	—	—	—	—	1929	1939	Became US 80/SH 1 (now FM 51)
SH 89	6.6	10.6	US 181 near Sinton	US 181 / SH 188 near Sinton	1988	current	
SH 90	42.07	67.71	SH 6 / SH 105 in Navasota	SH 75 in Madisonville	1923	current	Former SH 32A
SH 91	—	—	—	—	1923	1943	Transferred to FM 84
SH 91	13.61	21.90	US 75 of Sherman	SH-91 in Denison	1994	current	Former SH 75A
SH 92	—	—	—	—	1924	1924	Removed from system; became SH 87A (now SH 184) in 1928
SH 92	37.93	61.04	SH 70 in Rotan	US 277 near Stamford	1924	current	
SH 93	—	—	—	—	1924	1933	Transferred to SH 36
SH 93	—	—	—	—	1937	1938	Former SH 97; transferred back to SH 97
SH 93	6.48	10.43	I-30 / US 59 in Texarkana	I-369/US 59 in Texarkana	1967	current	
SH 94	50.27	80.90	SH 19 in Trinity	Future Bus. I-69 / Bus. US 59 / Bus. US 69 in Lufkin	1924	current	Former SH 7B
SH 95	122.36	196.92	US 190 / SH 36 / Loop 363 in Temple	US 77 Alt. near Yoakum	1924	current	Former SH 2F
SH 96	—	—	—	—	1924	1945	Transferred to US 77
SH 96	6.45	10.38	I-45 in League City	SH 146 in Kemah	1994	current	
SH 97	143.75	231.34	I-35 in Cotulla	US 90 in Waelder	1924	current	
SH 98	8.90	14.32	US 82 near New Boston	US 67 near Simms	1924	current	
SH 99	—	—	—	—	1924	1934	Transferred to SH 10 (now US 67)
SH 99	—	—	—	—	1960	1968	Former SH 10, became US 377
SH 99	123	198	I-69/US 59 in Sugar Land	Bus. SH 146 in Baytown	1994	current	Grand Parkway, outer-belt around Houston. Segments D through I-2 are complete, Segments B and C are still in planning, and Segment A is not considered viable.
SH 100	24.61	39.61	I-69E / US 77 / US 83 in Russeltown	Queen Isabella Memorial Bridge in Port Isabel	1924	current	
SH 101	—	—	—	—	1925	1957	Transferred to SH 208 and SH 163
SH 101	—	—	—	—	1925	1927	Renumbered SH 104 to avoid conflict with the other SH 101
SH 101	25.56	41.13	SH 114 in Bridgeport	US 81 in Bowie	1975	current	Former US 81, US 287 and SH 114
SH 102	—	—	—	—	1925	1927	Became part of SH 117 to avoid conflict with the other SH 102
SH 102	—	—	—	—	1925	1944	Became FM 112
SH 102	22.76	36.63	NM 421 in Dallam County	US 87 in Dallam County	1955	current	Officially designated as FM 808 until 1990
SH 103	63.05	101.47	SH 7 in Angelina County	SH 21 in Sabine County	1925	current	
SH 103	—	—	—	—	1927	1929	Renumbered from SH 104 so SH 104 could be used to renumber SH 101 as there was already another SH 101; duplicated the other SH 103; now FM 101
SH 104	—	—	—	—	1925	1927	Renumbered SH 103 so that SH 104 could be reused to renumber SH 101, as there was already another SH 101
SH 104	—	—	—	—	1927	1951	Renumbered from SH 101 as there was already another SH 101; transferred to SH 29
SH 104	11.1	17.9	FM 106 in Brownsville	PR 100 in South Padre Island	proposed	—	Designated December 2023
SH 105	150.37	242.00	Bus. US 290 at Brenham	US 69 / US 96 / US 287 at Beaumont	1925	current	
SH 106	—	—	—	—	1925	1939	Replaced by US 287
SH 107	—	—	—	—	1925	1927	Renumbered to SH 120 as there was already another SH 107
SH 107	—	—	—	—	1925	1931	Transferred to SH 4 by 1928; designation changed back to SH 107 in 1929 when SH 4 was rerouted off of this road; transferred to SH 16
SH 107	46.09	74.17	I-2/US 83 in Mission	I-69E/US 77 in Combes	1932	current	
SH 108	33.21	53.45	US 281 in Stephenville	SH 16 in Strawn	1925	current	
SH 109	—	—	—	—	1925	1932	Former SH 21, became SH 95
SH 109	—	—	—	—	1932	1948	Became SH 158
SH 110	77.34	124.47	US 84 / Loop 62 in Rusk	US 80 in Grand Saline	1925	current	Former SH 40
SH 111	76.24	122.70	US 183 / SH 97 south of Gonzales	SH 71 in Midfield	1925	current	
SH 112	—	—	—	—	1925	1939	Former SH 21, became SH 200 (now SH 97)
SH 112	10.43	16.79	I-20 in Eastland	US 183 north of Eastland	1992	current	Former SH 69
SH 113	—	—	—	—	1925	1975	Transferred to SH 239
SH 114	194.46	312.95	NM 114	SH 183 in Irving	1926	current	
SH 115	—	—	—	—	1926	1926	Renumbered SH 116 to avoid conflict with the other SH 115
SH 115	—	—	—	—	1926	1931	Became a portion of SH 9 (now US 287)
SH 115	106.74	171.78	I-20 in Pyote	SH 349 in Patricia	1932	current	
SH 116	—	—	—	—	1926	1934	Renumbered from SH 115 as there was already another SH 115; became SH 14 (now SH 289)
SH 116	—	—	—	—	1955	1977	Became SH 114
SH 117	—	—	—	—	1926	1955	Renumbered from SH 102 as there was already another SH 102; redesignated as SH 15
SH 117	—	—	—	—	1983	1996	Officially designated but never built
SH 118	—	—	—	—	1926	1931	Replaced by SH 17
SH 118	155.27	249.88	Big Bend National Park	I-10 in Kent	1931	current	Former SH 3
SH 119	48.99	78.84	US 87 / SH 97 in Stockdale	US 77 Alt. / US 183	1926	current	
SH 120	—	—	—	—	1927	1939	Transferred to SH 24 (now US 380) and SH 16
SH 121	85.56	137.70	I-35W in Fort Worth	SH 78 north of Bonham	1927	current	
SH 122	—	—	—	—	1927	1939	Transferred to SH 171
SH 122	—	—	—	—	1988	2015	eliminated when Fort Bend Parkway Toll Road was completed in 2015.
SH 123	81.10	130.52	US 181 in Karnes City	I-35 in San Marcos	1927	current	
SH 124	—	—	—	—	1927	1930	Transferred to SH 81 (now SH 16)
SH 124	40.20	64.70	SH 87 at High Island	US 69 / US 96 / US 287 in Beaumont	1930	current	
SH 125	—	—	—	—	1927	1939	Transferred to SH 73-T (now SH 65) and SH 124
SH 125	27.75	44.66	NM 125 near Bledsoe	SH 114 in Whiteface	1955	current	Officially designated as FM 769 until 1990
SH 126	—	—	—	—	1927	1935	Redesignated SH 222 as part of a project
SH 127	—	—	—	—	1927	1930	Cancelled due to lack of funding; restored as SH 202 (now SH 72 and SH 97) in 1934
SH 127	21.22	34.15	US 90 in Sabinal	US 83 in Concan	1932	current	Former SH 30
SH 128	—	—	—	—	1927	1936	Became SH 44
SH 128	—	—	—	—	1936	1936	Became SH 237
SH 128	13.77	22.16	NM 128 in Andrews County	SH 115 in Andrews County	1955	current	Officially designated as FM 781 until 1990
SH 129	—	—	—	—	1928	1934	Transferred to SH 23 (later US 283, now US 183)
SH 130	—	—	—	—	1928	1939	Became US 62 and US 180
SH 130	130.6	210.2	US 183 / SH 45 Toll	I-35 in Georgetown	1985	current	
SH 131	33.09	53.25	US 277 in Eagle Pass	US 90, 12 miles (19 km) north of Brackettville	1928	current	
SH 132	—	—	—	—	1928	1932	Former SH 35A, became a portion of SH 146
SH 132	12.71	20.45	I-35 in Devine	I-35 in Lytle	1991	current	Former US 81
SH 133	—	—	—	—	1928	1933	Became a portion of SH 105
SH 134	—	—	—	—	1928	1930	Replaced by SH 24
SH 134	—	—	—	—	1930	2006	Formerly connected the San Jacinto Monument with SH 225; was an isolated highway until SH 225 was created in 1936.
SH 135	46.68	75.12	US 69 in Jacksonville	US 271 near Gladewater	1928	current	
SH 136	108.58	174.74	BL I-40 in Amarillo	SH-136 (OK) north of Gruver	1929	current	
SH 137	192.24	309.38	SH 163 near Ozona	US 385 in Brownfield	1929	current	
SH 138	—	—	—	—	1929	1939	Replaced by US 62
SH 138	6.36	10.24	US 183 in Williamson County	SH 195 in Florence	1988	current	Former portion of SH 195
SH 139	—	—	—	—	1929	1930	Became a portion of SH 22 (this section now part of US 287)
SH 139	—	—	—	—	1930	1948	Became a portion of SH 7
SH 140	—	—	—	—	1929	1934	Cancelled when completed; became Spur 164 in 1945
SH 140	2.34	3.77	Bus. SH 349 in Midland	I-20 / SH 158 in Midland	2012	current	Former BS 158-B
SH 141	16.27	26.18	Future I-69C/US 281 in Jim Wells County	Future I-69E/US 77 in Kingsville	1929	current	
SH 142	16.90	27.20	SH 80 in Martindale	US 183 in Lockhart	1929	current	
SH 143	—	—	—	—	1929	1934	Transferred to SH 51 (now US 385)
SH 144	39.03	62.81	SH 22 near Meridian	Bus. US 377 in Granbury	1930	current	
SH 145	—	—	—	—	1930	1931	Replaced by SH 66
SH 145	—	—	—	—	1932	1939	Replaced by Spur 73 (later FM 75, now city streets)
SH 146	105.97	170.54	I-45 / SH 3 / SH 6 in La Marque	Future I-69/US 59 at Livingston	1930	current	Former SH 6A
SH 147	46.84	75.38	SH 87 near Shelbyville	SH 63 in Zavalla	1930	current	Former SH 8B; was FM 10 from 1942–1947
SH 148	55.15	88.76	US 281 / SH 114 in Jacksboro	SH 79 in Petrolia	1930	current	Former SH 25A
SH 149	33.87	54.51	Future I-369/US 59 in Carthage	I-20 in Longview	1930	current	Former SH 26A
SH 150	35.94	57.84	I-45 near New Waverly	Future I-69/US 59 in Shepherd	1930	current	Former SH 45A
SH 151	—	—	—	—	1930	1951	Became a portion of SH 29
SH 151	10.67	17.17	Loop 1604 in San Antonio	US 90 in San Antonio	1984	current	
SH 152	108.60	174.77	US 87 / US 287 in Dumas	SH-152 (OK) east of Wheeler	1930	current	Former SH 33A
SH 153	—	—	—	—	1930	1942	Became FM 56 (now SH 317)
SH 153	70.89	114.09	US 84 / US 283 in Coleman	SH 70 in Nolan County	1988	current	Former FM 53
SH 154	99.65	160.37	SH 24 in Cooper	Loop 390 in Marshall	1930	current	Former SH 37A
SH 155	111.75	179.84	US 79 / SH 19 in Palestine	US 59 in Linden	1930	current	
SH 156	14.23	22.90	SH 150 in Coldspring	US 190 in Point Blank	1930	current	
SH 157	—	—	—	—	1930	1945	Former SH 67A, became a portion of SH 6 (now US 183)
SH 158	170.16	273.85	SH 302 near Goldsmith	US 67 / US 83 in Ballinger	1930	current	
SH 159	57.73	92.91	Bus. SH 71 in La Grange	US 290 / Bus. SH 6 in Hempstead	1930	current	Former SH 73A
SH 160	8.89	14.31	SH 78 in Desert	US 69 / SH 11 in Whitewright	1930	current	Former SH 78A
SH 161	—	—	—	—	1930	1931	Former SH 84A, replaced by SH 70
SH 161	12.31	19.81	SH 183 in Irving	I-35E in Carrollton	1977	current	
SH 162	—	—	—	—	1930	1940	Replaced by Spur 91 (now PR 27)
SH 163	203.11	326.87	US 90 in Comstock	BL I-20 in Colorado City	1930	current	
SH 164	54.42	87.58	SH 6 10 miles (16 km) east of Waco	SH 75 in Buffalo	1930	current	
SH 165	0.51	0.82	—	—	1930	current	Signed only within Texas State Cemetery; brown signs (denoting recreational or cultural interest) pointing to cemetery are found elsewhere.
SH 166	43.09	69.35	SH 118 in Jeff Davis County	SH 17 in Fort Davis	1930	current	
SH 167	—	—	—	—	1931	1940	Replaced by Spur 92
SH 167	0.14	0.23	US 67 / US 377	Bus. US 67	2012	current	Shortest state highway in Texas
SH 168	—	—	—	—	1932	1934	Partially redesignated SH 97
SH 168	0.87	1.40	SH 87 in Galveston	Galveston naval installation	1986	current	Shortest signed state highway in Texas; former routing of SH 87
SH 169	—	—	—	—	1932	1932	Became part of SH 89
SH 169	—	—	—	—	1990	1991	Designation replaced Spur 69, reverted to Spur 69 after cancellation
SH 170	—	—	—	—	1932	1955	Replaced by SH 33
SH 170	6.52	10.49	I-35W in Fort Worth	SH 114 in Roanoke	1988	current	
SH 171	110.85	178.40	US 84 in Mexia	US 180 in Weatherford	1932	current	
SH 172	28.47	45.82	Olivia	Loop 522 in Ganado	1932	current	
SH 173	97.34	156.65	SH 16 near Jourdanton	SH 16 near Kerrville	1932	current	
SH 174	50.21	80.81	SH 22 in Meridian	I-35W in Burleson	1932	current	
SH 175	8.49	13.66	FM 1806 in Montague	US 82 in Nocona	1932	current	
SH 176	—	—	—	—	1932	1939	Became part of SH 31
SH 176	90.00	144.84	I-20 at Big Spring	US 385 in Andrews	1959	current	Officially designated RM 87 until 1990
SH 177	—	—	—	—	1932	1940	Replaced by Spur 93 (now FM 616)
SH 178	—	—	—	—	1932	1938	Replaced by SH 152 (now part of US 87)
SH 178	2.86	4.60	I-10 in El Paso	NM 136	1991	current	
SH 179	8.44	13.58	Bus. US 84 at Teague	SH 75 at Dew	1932	current	
SH 180	—	—	—	—	1932	1938	Former SH 5A, restored as SH 5 Spur, now Spur 23 (now FM 44)
SH 180	30.38	48.89	I-35W in Fort Worth	I-35E in Dallas	1991	current	Former US 80
SH 181	—	—	—	—	1932	1950	Became a portion of FM 999
SH 182	10.51	16.91	US 69 at Alba	SH 37 at Quitman	1932	current	
SH 183	35.94	57.84	I-20 / I-820 in Fort Worth	I-35E / US 77 in Dallas	1932	current	
SH 184	11.08	17.83	US 96 at Bronson	SH 87 at Hemphill	1932	current	
SH 185	51.56	82.98	SH 238 at Seadrift	Future Bus. I-69/Bus. US 59 at Victoria	1932	current	
SH 186	47.71	76.78	US 281 at Linn	Port Mansfield	1932	current	
SH 187	—	—	—	—	1932	1952	Transferred to US 183
SH 188	—	—	—	—	1932	1942	Replaced by FM 38
SH 188	41.58	66.92	I-37 near Mathis	Bus. SH 35 between Port Aransas and Rockport	1993	current	Former FM 881 and FM 1069
SH 189	—	—	—	—	1932	1935	Never built (later FM 133)
SH 190	—	—	—	—	1932	1934	Transferred to SH 29
SH 190	24.7	39.8	I-35E in Carrollton	I-30 in Garland	1977	current	
SH 191	—	—	—	—	1932	1939	Transferred to US 183 (now US 283)
SH 191	17.75	28.57	Spur 450 in Odessa	Loop 250 in Midland	1978	current	
SH 192	—	—	—	—	1932	1933	Became a portion of SH 27 (now US 285)
SH 193	6.48	10.43	SH 108 at Mingus	I-20 near Gordon	1933	current	
SH 194	42.72	68.75	US 385 at Dimmitt	FM 3466 at Plainview	1933	current	
SH 195	34.73	55.89	I-35 near Georgetown	FM 439 at Fort Cavazos	1933	current	
SH 196	—	—	—	—	1933	1939	Former SH 27, became US 290
SH 197	—	—	—	—	1933	1941	Later replaced by US 77 (now I-35E)
SH 198	37.67	60.62	SH 31 at Malakoff	SH 64 at Canton	1933	current	
SH 199	53.25	85.70	US 281/US 380/SH 114 in Jacksboro	I-30/US 377 at Fort Worth	1933	current	
SH 200	—	—	—	—	1933	1952	Replaced by US 90 Alt. and SH 97
SH 200	4.8	7.7	SH 361 in Ingleside	Corpus Christi Home Port	proposed	—	Proposed (designated 1988) but unbuilt
SH 201	—	—	—	—	1934	1934	Later SH 252 (now FM 267)
SH 201	7.57	12.18	I-14/US 190 at Fort Cavazos	SH 195 at Killeen	2002	current	
SH 202	29.77	47.91	Future I-69W/US 59 at Beeville	US 77 Alt. near Refugio	1934	current	
SH 203	39.84	64.12	US 287 at Hedley	SH-9 (OK) west of Madge, Okla.	1934	current	
SH 204	37.92	61.03	US 79 at Jacksonville	US 259 near Caro	1934	current	Former SH 110 Spur
SH 205	23.28	37.47	SH 78 at Lavon	US 80 at Terrell	1934	current	
SH 206	55.89	89.95	US 67 at Coleman	I-20 at Cisco	1934	current	
SH 207	199.71	321.40	CR 202 north of Gruver	US 380 at Post	1934	current	
SH 208	145.19	233.66	SH 70 near Spur	US 87 in San Angelo	1934	current	
SH 209	—	—	—	—	1934	1938	Became a portion of SH 152
SH 210	—	—	—	—	1934	1935	never built; revived as FM 27 in 1942
SH 210	5.9	9.5	I-610 in Houston	Daikin Park area	proposed	—	Proposed (designated 1992) but unbuilt
SH 211	—	—	—	—	1934	1942	Replaced by FM 50 and Spur 197 (now FM 390 and FM 390 Spur)
SH 211	3.7	6.0	US 90 in Bexar County (south portion)	FM 1957 west of San Antonio	1986	current	
SH 211	7.4	11.9	FM 471 in Medina County (north portion)	SH 16 in Bexar County	1986	current	
SH 212	—	—	—	—	1934	1935	never built; part was revived as FM 59 in 1942; other portion later became FM 488
SH 213	15.29	24.61	SH 305 near Lipscomb	US 60 at Higgins	1934	current	
SH 214	193.27	311.04	I-40 at Adrian	US 62 / US 380 at Seminole	1935	current	
SH 215	—	—	—	—	1935	1937	Cancelled because the first FM Road (now SH 315) was designated
SH 216	—	—	—	—	1935	1937	became a portion of SH 158
SH 217	13.59	21.87	US 60 at Canyon	Palo Duro Canyon State Park	1935	current	
SH 218	3.99	6.42	I-35 near Schertz	FM 78 at Randolph Air Force Base	1935	current	
SH 219	—	—	—	—	1935	1940	Redesignated as Spur 94 (now a city street)
SH 220	13.52	21.76	SH 6 at Hico	US 67 at Chalk Mountain	1935	current	
SH 221	—	—	—	—	1935	1938	Former SH 36A, cancelled because a more direct route of SH 36 was built; now FM 93 and FM 436
SH 222	59.93	96.45	US 82 / SH 114 14 miles SE of Guthrie	US 380 8 miles (13 km) west of Throckmorton	1935	current	
SH 223	1.64	2.64	US 67 / US 90 in Alpine	SH 118 in Alpine	1935	current	
SH 224	—	—	—	—	1935	1938	Redesignated Spur 86 (now a local route)
SH 224	14.90	23.98	SH 34 in Greenville	SH 24 / SH 50 in Commerce	1979	current	Former SH 24
SH 225	15.60	25.11	I-610 in Houston	SH 146 / Future SH 99 in La Porte	1935	current	
SH 226	—	—	—	—	1936	1940	Redesignated Spur 95
SH 227	—	—	—	—	1936	1956	Became a portion of SH 51 (now US 385)
SH 227	—	—	—	—	1987	1990	Former SH 288, transferred to BS 288-B
SH 228	—	—	—	—	1936	1939	Became a portion of SH 73 (portions now I-10)
SH 229	—	—	—	—	1936	1939	Redesignated as PR 12
SH 230	—	—	—	—	1936	1942	Replaced by FM 50 and FM 60 (now FM 50)
SH 230	—	—	—	—	1990	2003	Replaced by US 287
SH 231	—	—	—	—	1936	1941	Proposed but never built; one portion became FM 902 in 1948
SH 232	—	—	—	—	1936	1942	Replaced by RM 32
SH 233	—	—	—	—	1936	1939	Replaced by SH 118
SH 234	6.42	10.33	I-37 in Edroy	US 77 / FM 631 in Odem	1936	current	
SH 235	—	—	—	—	1936	1959	Renumbered SH 12
SH 236	6.86	11.04	SH 36 at The Grove	FM 107 north of Mother Neff State Park	1936	current	
SH 237	16.08	25.88	SH 159 near Oldenburg	US 290 near Burton	1936	current	Former SH 72
SH 238	17.68	28.45	SH 185 northwest of Seadrift	SH 35 in Port Lavaca	1936	current	
SH 239	66.83	107.55	SH 72 east of Kenedy	FM 774 in Austwell	1936	current	Cancelled briefly in 1938, re-established in 1939
SH 240	43.25	69.60	Bus. US 287 in Wichita Falls	US 287 east of Harrold	1936	current	
SH 241	—	—	—	—	1936	1939	Replaced by SH 173 (now SH 16); rest cancelled; one section restored 1940 but eliminated in 1942 in exchange for SH 346.
SH 242	—	—	—	—	1936	1939	Replaced by SH 6
SH 242	21.63	34.81	FM 1488 in The Woodlands	I-69/US 59 near Splendora	1985	current	
SH 243	27.91	44.92	US 175 in Kaufman	SH 64 in Canton	1937	current	
SH 244	—	—	—	—	1937	1940	Replaced by Spur 96 (now FM 1098)
SH 245	—	—	—	—	1937	1940	Replaced by Spur 97 (now FM 250)
SH 246	—	—	—	—	1937	1951	Cancelled due to completion of Loop 12
SH 247	—	—	—	—	1937	1942	Partly replaced by FM 64
SH 248	—	—	—	—	1937	1940	Replaced by Spur 98 (now Loop 98)
SH 249	—	—	—	—	1937	1940	Replaced by Spur 99 (now part of FM 1458)
SH 249	49.44	79.57	I-45 in Houston	SH 105 near Navasota	1988	current	Former FM 149
SH 250	—	—	—	—	1937	1939	Became a portion of SH 107
SH 251	11.51	18.52	FM 926 in Newcastle	SH 79 in Olney	1937	current	
SH 252	—	—	—	—	1937	1939	Former SH 201, replaced by SH 222 (now FM 267)
SH 253	—	—	—	—	1937	1941	Replaced by SH 200 (now US 90 Alt.)
SH 254	18.54	29.84	SH 16 west of Graford	US 281 at Peadenville	1937	current	
SH 255	—	—	—	—	1937	1942	Replaced by FM 46
SH 255	22.45	36.13	Colombia-Solidarity International Bridge	I-35 north of Laredo	2004	current	Operated as the Camino Colombia Toll Road until 2017
SH 256	61.62	99.17	SH 86 / SH 207 in Silverton	US 83 near Buck Creek	1937	current	
SH 257	—	—	—	—	1937	1939	Became a portion of SH 202 (now US 59)
SH 258	11.17	17.98	SH 25 at Kadane Corner	US 82 / US 277 southwest of Wichita Falls	1937	current	
SH 259	—	—	—	—	1938	1962	Renumbered to SH 42 to avoid confusion with US 259
SH 260	—	—	—	—	1938	1938	Cancelled when complete; became SH 77 (now FM 71) in 1939
SH 261	8.58	13.81	SH 29 near Buchanan Dam	RM 2241 near Bluffton	1938	current	
SH 262	—	—	—	—	1938	1939	Cancelled when construction was complete (later RM 87, now SH 176)
SH 263	—	—	—	—	1938	1939	Cancelled when construction was complete (later FM 82, now SH 121)
SH 264	—	—	—	—	1938	1940	Replaced by Spur 100
SH 265	—	—	—	—	1938	1942	Cancelled in exchange for creation of FM 3
SH 265	—	—	—	—	1988	1994	Proposed but never built
SH 266	—	—	—	—	1938	1939	Replaced by SH 7
SH 267	—	—	—	—	1938	1940	Proposed but never built (later RM 336)
SH 267	—	—	—	—	2012	2013	Transferred to US 67
SH 268	—	—	—	—	1938	1939	Cancelled when construction was complete (later RM 380)
SH 269	—	—	—	—	1938	1942	Replaced by FM 15
SH 270	—	—	—	—	1938	1942	Redesignated FM 14
SH 271	—	—	—	—	1938	1939	Replaced by SH 137 (later SH 51, now SH 349)
SH 272	—	—	—	—	1938	1939	Cancelled when construction was complete; route later restored as FM 19 in 1942.
SH 273	61.45	98.89	SH 203 northeast of Hedley	US 60 / SH 152 in Pampa	1938	current	
SH 274	22.11	35.58	SH 31 / FM 764 in Trinidad	US 175 in Kemp	1938	current	
SH 275	—	—	—	—	1938	1941	Became FM 1790 in 1951
SH 275	6.23	10.03	I-45 in Galveston	SH 87 in Galveston	1993	current	
SH 276	—	—	—	—	1938	1953	Transferred to SH 302
SH 276	40.81	65.68	SH 205 in Rockwall	US 69 in Emory	1960	current	
SH 277	—	—	—	—	1938	1940	Redesignated Spur 101 (now SH 42)
SH 278	—	—	—	—	1938	1940	Became FM 54 in 1942
SH 279	31.52	50.73	US 67 / US 84 in Brownwood	SH 206 south of Cross Plains	1938	current	
SH 280	—	—	—	—	1938	1939	Replaced by SH 194, but ultimately never built
SH 281	—	—	—	—	1939	1939	Proposed, but was designated as SH 319 (now SH 199)
SH 282	—	—	—	—	1939	1967	Formerly a portion of SH 18; replaced by SH 207 and SH 15
SH 282	—	—	—	—	1993	1996	was cancelled when work was completed; now Caesar Avenue
SH 283	11.78	18.96	US 380 near Old Glory	US 277 / SH 6 in Stamford	1939	current	Formerly part of SH 16; this section renumbered in 1939, and now the original portion is part of SH 6
SH 284	—	—	—	—	1939	1951	Former SH 74A, became a portion of US 183
SH 285	56.87	91.52	SH 16 in Hebbronville	Future I-69E/US 77 in Riviera	1939	current	One section formerly part of SH 16
SH 286	15.21	24.48	FM 70 at Chapman Ranch	I-37 in Corpus Christi	1939	current	Formerly part of SH 96
SH 287	—	—	—	—	1939	1939	Proposed, but was designated as SH 16
SH 288	60.01	96.58	SH 36 / FM 1495 in Freeport	I-45 in Houston	1939	current	Formerly part of SH 19
SH 289	53.70	86.42	Loop 12 in Dallas	Elks Road north of Pottsboro	1939	current	Formerly part of SH 14 (this portion of SH 14 was SH 116 until 1935)
SH 290	—	—	—	—	1939	1955	Former SH 24 (this portion of SH 24 was SH 134 until 1933), replaced by SH 116 (now SH 114)
SH 290	24.36	39.20	I-10 / SH 349 northeast of Sheffield	I-10 east of Sheffield	1992	current	Former US 290
SH 291	—	—	—	—	1939	1962	Former SH 2A; was to be cancelled when complete, but redesignated FM 2719 due to completion of FM 67 extension
SH 292	—	—	—	—	1939	1940	Former SH 68A; redesignated Spur 102
SH 293	—	—	—	—	1939	1940	Former SH 103A; renumbered SH 103
SH 294	42.18	67.88	US 79 / US 84 near Tucker	US 69 / SH 21 in Alto	1939	current	Formerly part of SH 7
SH 295	—	—	—	—	1939	1953	Formerly part of SH 44 (this was part of SH 128 until 1938); Became US 77
SH 296	—	—	—	—	1939	1939	Proposed, but replaced by a rerouted SH 63
SH 297	—	—	—	—	1939	1939	Became a portion of SH 95, its former designation (this was part of SH 109 until 1933)
SH 297	—	—	—	—	1989	1994	Became a portion of SH 130 Toll
SH 298	—	—	—	—	1939	1939	Proposed, but was designated as Spur 69 (later SH 235, now SH 12)
SH 299	—	—	—	—	1939	1942	Replaced by FM 58
SH 300	—	—	—	—	1939	1943	Redesignated SH 43
SH 300	18.62	29.97	US 80 in Longview	US 271 / SH 155 in Gilmer	1968	current	Former FM 1403
SH 301	—	—	—	—	1939	1959	Cancelled when construction was complete (now FM 571)
SH 302	83.17	133.85	US 285 southwest of Mentone	I-20 in Odessa	1939	current	
SH 303	—	—	—	—	1938	1943	Became a portion of SH 137
SH 304	42.94	69.11	SH 97 northeast of Gonzales	SH 21 / SH 71 in Bastrop	1938	current	
SH 305	29.41	47.33	US 60 in Glazier	SH 15 east of Darrouzett	1938	current	
SH 306	—	—	—	—	1938	1939	Became a portion of SH 34
SH 307	—	—	—	—	1938	1961	Cancelled due to completion of SH 30; became FM 2347 in 1967
SH 308	1.39	2.24	FM 60 in College Station	Main Street in Bryan	1938	current	
SH 309	11.68	18.80	US 287 near Round Prairie	SH 31 in Kerens	1939	current	
SH 310	—	—	—	—	1939	1939	Redesignated as part of PR 10
SH 310	6.81	10.96	US 175 in Dallas	I-45 in Hutchins	1987	current	Former US 75
SH 311	—	—	—	—	1939	1943	Redesignated FM 86
SH 312	—	—	—	—	1939	1939	Redesignated as part of SH 80 (now FM 99)
SH 312	2.0	3.2	US 90 Alt. at Sugar Land	I-69/US 59 at Sugar Land	proposed	—	Designated, but not yet constructed; originally designated SH 362
SH 313	—	—	—	—	1939	1941	
SH 314	—	—	—	—	1939	1940	Never built; partially restored in 1945 as FM 512 and completely restored in 1949 as FM 512, FM 816 and FM 1551 (now FM 816); now SH 11
SH 315	26.04	41.91	US 259 in Mount Enterprise	Bus. US 79 in Carthage	1939	current	
SH 316	9.07	14.60	SH 238 south of Port Lavaca	Turnabout near Indianola	1939	current	
SH 317	44.79	72.08	I-35 in Belton	SH 6 in Valley Mills	1939	current	
SH 318	—	—	—	—	1939	1939	Became a portion of SH 328 (now SH 83) in 1940
SH 319	—	—	—	—	1939	1939	Formerly part of SH 34, replaced by SH 199
SH 320	18.79	30.24	SH 53 near Zabcikville	SH 7 west of Marlin	1939	current	
SH 321	20.29	32.65	SH 105 / Loop 573 at Cleveland	US 90 / SH 146 at Dayton	1939	current	
SH 322	17.94	28.87	US 259 in Henderson	I-20 in Longview	1939	current	
SH 323	12.80	20.60	SH 135 in Overton	SH 64 in Henderson	1939	current	
SH 324	—	—	—	—	1939	1942	Replaced by FM 13
SH 325	—	—	—	—	1939	1940	Removed from system; revived as FM 66 in 1942.
SH 326	24.37	39.22	US 90 in Nome	US 69 / US 287 in Kountze	1940	current	
SH 327	8.01	12.89	US 69 / US 287 south of Kountze	US 96 in Silsbee	1940	current	
SH 328	—	—	—	—	1940	1951	Renumbered SH 83
SH 329	62.19	100.09	SH 18 in Grandfalls	US 67 / SH 349 in Rankin	1940	current	
SH 330	—	—	—	—	1940	1953	Replaced by FM 457
SH 331	—	—	—	—	1940	1940	Proposed but never built
SH 332	15.65	25.19	SH 36 in Brazoria	Surfside Beach	1939	current	Designated as FM 1460 from 1950-1956
SH 333	—	—	—	—	1939	1959	Cancelled when the FM 1495 bridge was built
SH 334	—	—	—	—	1939	1959	Cancelled when the FM 1495 bridge was built
SH 334	10.12	16.29	SH 274 at Seven Points	US 175 between Mabank and Eustace	1989	current	Former portion of FM 85
SH 335	—	—	—	—	1939	1975	Proposed but never built
SH 336	14.51	23.35	US 281 in Hidalgo	SH 107 in McAllen/Edinburg	1940	current	
SH 337	—	—	—	—	1940	1942	Replaced by FM 68
SH 337	—	—	—	—	1955	1963	Signed (but not designated) over FM 1077; transferred to US 82
SH 337	21.10	33.96	US 180 in Mineral Wells	SH 16 northwest of Graford	1963	current	
SH 338	6.72	10.81	US 259 at Rocky Branch	SH 77 in Naples	1940	current	
SH 339	45.44	73.13	SH 285 west of Falfurrias	SH 16 south of Freer	1941	current	
SH 340	—	—	—	—	1941	1945	Became a portion of FM 363
SH 341	—	—	—	—	1941	1990	Became a portion of FM 519
SH 342	15.37	24.74	US 77 near Red Oak	Loop 12 in Dallas	1941	current	Former routing of US 77
SH 343	—	—	—	—	1941	1942	Former US 90, replaced by US 90 Alt.
SH 344	—	—	—	—	1940	1953	Became a portion of FM 2031
SH 345	8.77	14.11	Bus. US 77 in San Benito	FM 106 in Rio Hondo	1942	current	
SH 346	—	—	—	—	1942	1965	Became a portion of SH 16
SH 347	11.44	18.41	SH 87 in Port Arthur	US 69 / US 96 / US 287 in Beaumont	1942	current	Former US 69
SH 348	—	—	—	—	1943	1991	Became a portion of FM 1765
SH 349	197.43	317.73	US 90 at Dryden	SH 137 near Lamesa	1943	current	Former FM 9
SH 350	47.90	77.09	BL I-20 in Big Spring	Bus. US 84 / US 180 / SH 208 in Snyder	1943	current	
SH 351	25.12	40.43	Bus. US 83 in Abilene	US 180 / SH 6 west of Albany	1943	current	Former US 80 Alt.
SH 352	13.62	21.92	I-30 / US 69 in Dallas	US 80 in Sunnyvale	1943	current	Former SH 183
SH 353	—	—	—	—	1940	1952	Redesignated FM 167 between 1945–1946, became a portion of SH 174
SH 354	21.35	34.36	US 385 / FM 767 in Channing	US 87 / US 287 south of Masterson	1944	current	Formerly the temporary route of SH 5
SH 355	—	—	—	—	1946	1947	Designation replaced FM 118, reverted to FM 118 after cancellation
SH 356	8.88	14.29	SH 183 in Irving	I-35E / US 77 in Dallas	1946	current	Former FM 684
SH 357	11.05	17.78	FM 665 in Corpus Christi	SH 358 in Corpus Christi	1946	current	Former FM 692
SH 358	16.86	27.13	I-37 in Corpus Christi	Corpus Christi Naval Air Station in Corpus Christi	1946	current	Former FM 693
SH 359	—	—	—	—	1946	1947	Replaced by Loop 175 (now FM 568)
SH 359	135.23	217.63	US 83 in Laredo	US 181 in Skidmore	1954	current	Former US 59
SH 360	28.00	45.06	US 287 in Mansfield	SH 121 in Grapevine	1955	current	
SH 361	35.29	56.79	SH 22 in Corpus Christi	SH 35 in Gregory	1956	current	
SH 362	—	—	—	—	1956	1957	Cancelled in exchange for being redesignated FM 1900; now SH 82
SH 362	—	—	—	—	1986	1987	Renumbered SH 312 to avoid confusion with FM 362
SH 363	6.0	9.7	SH 200 in Ingleside	SH 35 in Aransas Pass	proposed	—	Designated in 1988, but not yet constructed
SH 364	6.27	10.09	I-2/US 83 in Palmview	FM 2221 north of La Homa	2001	current	Former FM 2894
SH 365	—	—	—	—	1988	1988	Became a portion of SH 363
SH 365	16.53	26.60	FM 1016 in Mission	FM 3072 in Pharr	proposed	—	Designated in 2010, but not yet constructed
SH 495	17.74	28.55	SH 107 in Mission	FM 1423 near Alamo	2001	current	Former FM 495
SH 550	—	—	—	—	1947	1960	Replaced by I-20 (now I-30) and Spur 341
SH 550 Toll	—	—	I-69E / US 77 / US 83 at Olmito	Port of Brownsville	proposed	—	Toll road under construction; replacing FM 511; when completed, route will be changed to I-169; parts have already been transferred to I-169.
SH 824	—	—	—	—	1964	1968	Former FM 1156 and RM 2475; transferred to SH 24 (now US 380)
NASA 1	7.47	12.02	I-45 in Webster	SH 146 / Future SH 99 in Seabrook	1965	current	Former FM 528
SH OSR	61.92	99.65	SH 21 west of Bryan	SH 21 at Midway	1942	current	Former SH 938
Former; Proposed and unbuilt
