= Velandipalayam =

- neighbourhood
- Location in Tamil Nadu, India
- Coordinates: 11.028237°N 76.930456°E
- Country: India
- State: Tamil Nadu
- District: Coimbatore

Government
  - Type: Mayor-council
  - Body: CCMC
- Elevation: 412 m (1,352 ft)

Languages
  - Official: Tamil
- Time zone: UTC+5:30 (IST)
- PIN: 641025
- Telephone code: 91-422
- Vehicle registration: TN 38

Velandipalayam is a suburban area located in Coimbatore city of Tamil Nadu state of India.

This locality is present near Sai Baba colony and is mostly occupied by middle-class people living in Coimbatore. One side is bordered by Thadagam road and the other side by Vadavalli. It is a residential area. More apartments are found in this area.

== Education ==
=== Schools ===
- Avila Convent
- Bharathi Matriculation Higher secondary school
- Liseux
- Vishvaa Academy

== Politics ==
Velandipalayam comes under Coimbatore-North taluk. It belongs to Coimbatore North constituency. At present ADMK is ruling.

== Transport ==
=== Air ===
The area is served by the Coimbatore International Airport at nearby Peelamedu.

=== Rail ===
The main station is Coimbatore Junction. The nearest railway station is Coimbatore North Junction.

=== Road ===
Velandipalayam is situated in Thadagam road. SH 164 passes through Velandipalayam which connects with Anaikatti.
