= List of highways numbered 167 =

The following highways are numbered 167:

== Canada ==
- Prince Edward Island Route 167
- Quebec Route 167
- Saskatchewan Highway 167

== Costa Rica ==
- National Route 167

== Finland ==
- Finnish regional road 167

== India ==
- National Highway 167 (India)

== Japan ==
- Japan National Route 167

== United Kingdom ==
- A167 road
- B167 road

== United States ==
- U.S. Route 167
- Alabama State Route 167
- California State Route 167
- Connecticut Route 167
- Florida State Road 167 (former)
- Georgia State Route 167 (former)
- Illinois Route 167
- Indiana State Road 167
- K-167 (Kansas highway)
- Kentucky Route 167
- Maine State Route 167
- M-167 (Michigan highway) (former)
- Nevada State Route 167 (former)
- New Jersey Route 167
- New York State Route 167
- Ohio State Route 167
- Oklahoma State Highway 167
- Pennsylvania Route 167
- Tennessee State Route 167
- Texas State Highway 167 (former)
- Utah State Route 167
- Washington State Route 167
- Wisconsin Highway 167

Territories:

- Puerto Rico Highway 167

Preceded by 166	Lists of highways 167	Succeeded by 168
