= List of highways numbered 165 =

Route 165, or Highway 165, may refer to:

== Canada ==
- New Brunswick Route 165
- Prince Edward Island Route 165
- Quebec Route 165
- Saskatchewan Highway 165
- Winnipeg Route 165

== Costa Rica ==
- National Route 165

== India ==
- National Highway 165 (India)

== Japan ==
- Japan National Route 165

== United Kingdom ==
- A165 road
- B165 road

== United States ==
- Interstate 165 (disambiguation)
- U.S. Route 165
- Alabama State Route 165
- California State Route 165
- Colorado State Highway 165
- Connecticut Route 165
- Florida State Road 165 (former)
- Georgia State Route 165
- Illinois Route 165
- Indiana State Road 165
- Iowa Highway 165
- Kentucky Route 165
- Maryland Route 165
- M-165 (Michigan highway)
- Minnesota State Highway 165 (former)
- Missouri Route 165
- Nevada State Route 165
- New Jersey Route 165
- New Mexico State Road 165
- New York State Route 165
- Ohio State Route 165
- Oklahoma State Highway 165
- Rhode Island Route 165
- South Carolina Highway 165
- Tennessee State Route 165
- Texas State Highway 165
  - Texas State Highway Spur 165
  - Ranch to Market Road 165
- Utah State Route 165
- Virginia State Route 165
- Washington State Route 165
- Wisconsin Highway 165

Territories:

- Puerto Rico Highway 165
  - Puerto Rico Highway 165R

Preceded by 164	Lists of highways 165	Succeeded by 166
