= Texas State Highway 112 =

State highway in Texas

State Highway 112
- SH 112, highlighted in red

Route information
- Maintained by TxDOT
- Length: 10.427 mi (16.781 km)
- Existed: 1992–present

Major junctions
- South end: I-20 / FM 570 in Eastland
- SH 6 in Eastland
- North end: US 183 near Eastland

Location
- Country: United States
- State: Texas
- Counties: Eastland

Highway system
- Highways in Texas; Interstate; US; State; Former; Toll; Loops; Spurs; FM/RM; Park; Rec
← SH 111	→ SH 113

State Highway 112 (SH 112) is a short state highway that runs through the northern portions of Eastland County in the U.S. state of Texas. The routing was previously designated as State Highway 69 in 1971. Vandalism to the road signage as a result of its numbering had reached epidemic proportion by 1989, driving a resolution that the number of the road needed to be changed. The cost of resigning the roadway was considered reasonable by local governments, compared to that of the measures by law enforcement agencies that would be necessary to stop the vandalism. In 1992, the district requested and was granted renumbering of this route to State Highway 112.

== Route description ==
Overall, there are two segments of the highway that run more east and west and one that runs north and south. The southern terminus of SH 112 is at exit 343 of Interstate 20 within the city limits of Eastland. Continuing east from the frontage road is Farm to Market Road 570. SH 112 travels west along East Main Street through a commercialized area surrounding the interchange. After crossing the Leon River, it enters downtown Eastland and intersects SH 6 at Seaman Street. SH 6 travels south and west from this point, while SH 112 continues north along North Seaman Street. It crosses the Leon River again and passes the entrance to Eastland Municipal Airport and exits the city limits. SH 112 continues north through the barren lands of Eastland County before curving to the west northwest in the unincorporated community of Morton Valley. In Morton Valley, SH 112 intersects the western terminus of Farm to Market Road 101. After passing a radio tower and a gas processing plan, the highway ends at a stop-controlled intersection with U.S. Route 183.

== History ==
SH 112 was originally designated on August 11, 1925 as a route from Karnes City north to Nixon then northeast to near Gonzales. On July 17, 1934, the section south of Nixon was transferred to SH 29. On January 19, 1935, this section was changed back to SH 112. On September 22, 1936, the section south of Nixon was transferred to SH 80. The route was completed by September 26, 1939, but was reassigned to SH 200.

This section of highway has had five different state numbering since its inception. It was originally numbered as SH 22 from 1917 until 1923. In 1923 it was reassigned to SH 67. On September 26, 1945 it was renumbered again as SH 6 when it was extended. It kept this numbering until August 4, 1971, when SH 6 was reassigned to roadways further to the west. The route was then redesignated as SH 69. On September 14, 1992, the route was finally redesignated SH 112 due to vandalism issues.

== Junction list ==
The entire highway is in Eastland County.

Location	mi	km	Destinations	Notes
Eastland	0.0– 0.1	0.0– 0.16	I-20 / FM 570 east – Ranger, Cisco, Lake Leon	Exit 343 (I-20); western terminus of FM 101
Eastland	1.7	2.7	SH 6 (West Main Street / South Seaman Street)	
Morton Valley	6.6	10.6	FM 101 east – Ranger	Western terminus of FM 101
	10.4	16.7	US 183 – Breckenridge, Throckmorton, Cisco	
1.000 mi = 1.609 km; 1.000 km = 0.621 mi
