= Aberfoyle =

Aberfoyle may refer to:

- Aberfoyle, County Londonderry, Northern Ireland
- Aberfoyle, Stirling, Scotland
- Aberfoyle, Ontario, Canada
- Aberfoyle, Texas, US
- Aberfoyle, Warwick, a heritage house in Queensland, Australia

== See also ==
- Aberfoil, Alabama
