= List of highways numbered 166 =

The following highways are numbered 166:

== Canada ==
- Prince Edward Island Route 166

== India ==
- National Highway 166 (India)

== Japan ==
- Japan National Route 166

== United Kingdom ==
- A166 road

== United States ==
- U.S. Route 166
- Alabama State Route 166
- Arizona State Route 166 (former)
- California State Route 166
- Connecticut Route 166
- Florida State Road 166
- Georgia State Route 166
- Illinois Route 166
- Indiana State Road 166
- Kentucky Route 166
- Maine State Route 166
  - Maine State Route 166A
- Maryland Route 166
- M-166 (Michigan highway)
- Nevada State Route 166 (former)
- New Jersey Route 166
- New Mexico State Road 166
- New York State Route 166
- Ohio State Route 166
- Oklahoma State Highway 166
- Pennsylvania Route 166
- Tennessee State Route 166
- Texas State Highway 166
  - Texas State Highway Loop 166
- Utah State Route 166 (former)
- Virginia State Route 166
- Washington State Route 166
- Wisconsin Highway 166 (former)

Territories

- Puerto Rico Highway 166

Preceded by 165	Lists of highways 166	Succeeded by 167
