= List of highways numbered 168 =

Route 168, or Highway 168, may refer to:

== Canada ==
- Prince Edward Island Route 168

== Costa Rica ==
- National Route 168

== Japan ==
- Japan National Route 168

== Malaysia ==
- Malaysia Federal Route 168

== United Kingdom ==
- A168 road
- B168 road

== United States ==
- U.S. Route 168 (former)
- Alabama State Route 168
- Arkansas Highway 168
- California State Route 168
- Connecticut Route 168
- Georgia State Route 168
- Illinois Route 168 (former)
- Indiana State Road 168
- K-168 (Kansas highway)
- Kentucky Route 168
- Louisiana Highway 168
- Maine State Route 168
- Maryland Route 168
- Massachusetts Route 168
- M-168 (Michigan highway)
- Missouri Route 168
- Nevada State Route 168
- New Jersey Route 168
- New York State Route 168
- North Carolina Highway 168
- Ohio State Route 168
- Pennsylvania Route 168
- South Dakota Highway 168
- Tennessee State Route 168
- Texas State Highway 168
  - Texas State Highway Loop 168
  - Farm to Market Road 168
- Utah State Route 168
- Virginia State Route 168
- Washington State Route 168
- Wisconsin Highway 168

Territories

- Puerto Rico Highway 168

| Preceded by 167 | Lists of highways 168 | Succeeded by 169 |
