= Texas State Highway 210 =

State highway in Texas

State Highway 210

Route information
- Maintained by TxDOT
- Existed: 1992–present

Location
- Country: United States
- State: Texas

Highway system
- Highways in Texas; Interstate; US; State; Former; Toll; Loops; Spurs; FM/RM; Park; Rec
| ← SH 209 | → SH 211 |

State Highway 210 (SH 210) is a proposed state highway in the U.S. state of Texas that would run from I-610 on the western side of Houston to downtown near Union Station. It was designated on September 29, 1992.

== History ==
SH 210 was designated on July 16, 1934 from Fairfield to SH 14 at Wortham. On February 11, 1937 this route was cancelled as it was never built, and became FM 27 in 1942.
