= Texas State Highway 308 =

State highway in Texas

State Highway 308
- College Avenue

Route information
- Maintained by TxDOT
- Length: 1.386 mi (2.231 km)
- Existed: 1938–present

Major junctions
- South end: FM 60 at College Station
- North end: Sulphur Springs Road at Bryan

Location
- Country: United States
- State: Texas
- Counties: Brazos

Highway system
- Highways in Texas; Interstate; US; State; Former; Toll; Loops; Spurs; FM/RM; Park; Rec
← SH 307	→ SH 309

State Highway 308 (SH 308) or College Avenue, runs from FM 60 (University Drive) in College Station north to Sulphur Springs Road in Bryan. It is one route from the Texas A&M University campus to the university's Hensel Park, a recreation facility for faculty, staff, and students of the university.

== Route description ==
SH 308 begins at a junction with FM 60 (University Drive) and Bizzell Street in College Station. It follows College Avenue until it reaches its northern terminus at Sulphur Springs Road in Bryan.

== History ==
SH 308 was designated on January 24, 1939, from the former SH 230 (now FM 60 in College Station) through the A&M campus along Spence Street to the former SH 307 (now FM 2347). On August 1, 1941, the on-campus routing was changed to Bizzell Street, and on September 7, 1943, the highway was extended north to its current terminus. On January 31, 1961, the portion south of FM 60, including the on-campus portion, was removed from the highway, leaving it in its current, truncated state. SH 307 was cancelled in that same minute order.

== Junction list ==
The entire highway is in Brazos County.

Location	mi	km	Destinations	Notes
College Station	0.000	0.000	FM 60 (University Drive) / Bizzell Street	
Bryan	1.386	2.231	Sulphur Springs Road	
1.000 mi = 1.609 km; 1.000 km = 0.621 mi
