= Texas State Highway 222 =

State highway in Texas

State Highway 222
- SH 222; highlighted in red

Route information
- Maintained by TxDOT
- Length: 59.725 mi (96.118 km)
- Existed: by 1936–present

Major junctions
- West end: US 82 / SH 114 east of Guthrie
- SH 6 in Knox City; US 277 in Munday
- East end: US 380 west of Throckmorton

Location
- Country: United States
- State: Texas

Highway system
- Highways in Texas; Interstate; US; State; Former; Toll; Loops; Spurs; FM/RM; Park; Rec
← SH 221	→ SH 223

State Highway 222 (SH 222) is a state highway in north-central Texas. It runs 59.725 miles (96.118 km) between U.S. Highway 82/State Highway 114 (US 82/SH 114) and US 380. SH 222 was established in 1935 as a renumbering of SH 126.

== History ==
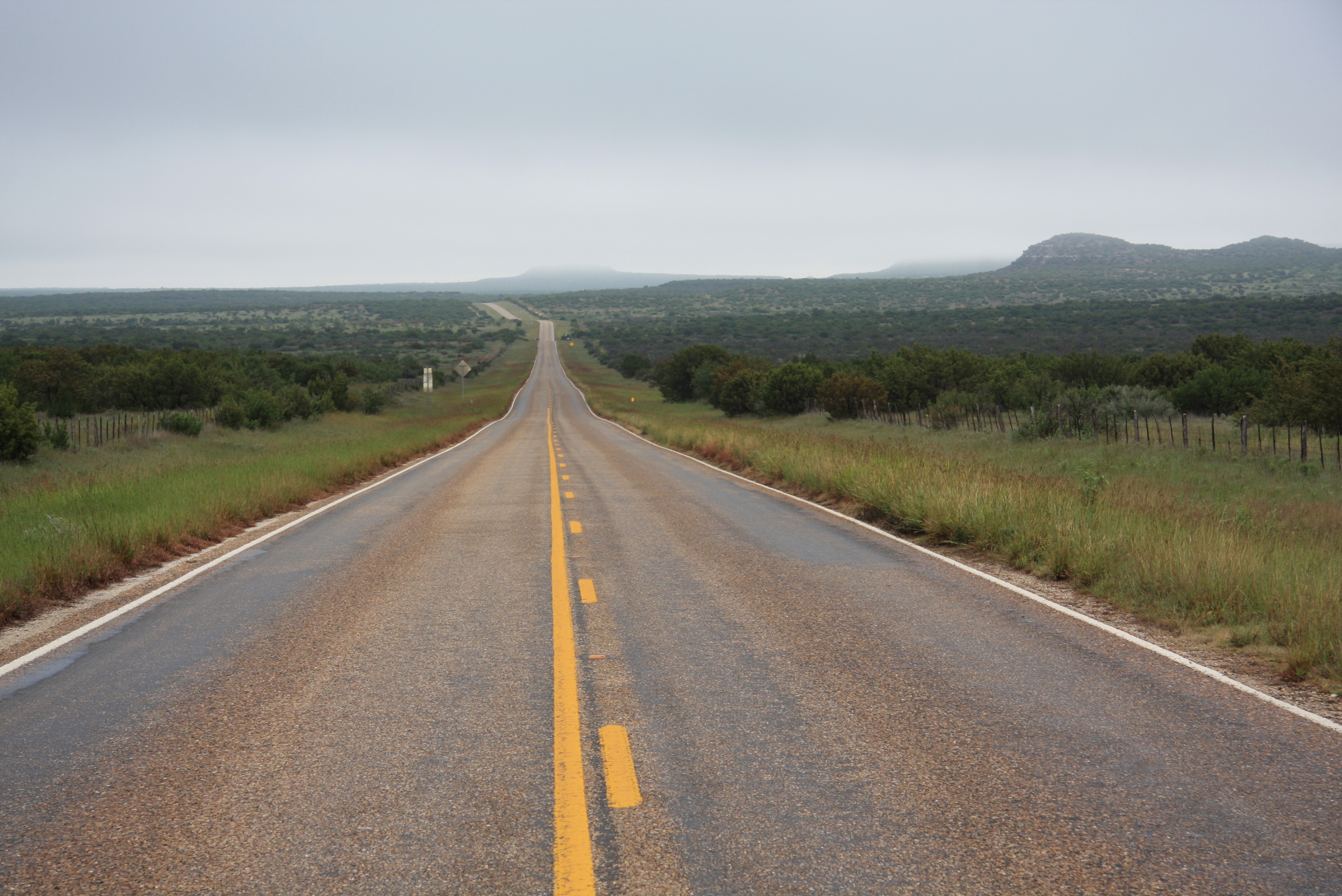
Texas State Highway 222, north of Buzzard Peak, King County, Texas.

The route was originally designated by 1928 between Knox City and Munday as SH 126. On March 19, 1930, SH 126 was removed from the state highway list, but was still designated. On August 27, 1935, SH 126, which was not on the State Highway List, was upgraded to a state highway, and renumbered to SH 222. On September 26, 1939, SH 222 was extended north to US 82, replacing SH 252. The section north of Munday was transferred to FM 267 on January 7, 1948. On September 25, 1973, an extension of SH 222 was signed, but not designated along FM 143, FM 1587, part of FM 266, and part of FM 1720. On August 29, 1990, the extension of SH 222 was officially designated, replacing FM 143, FM 1587, part of FM 266, and part of FM 1720.

== Junction list ==
County	Location	mi	km	Destinations	Notes
King				US 82 / SH 114	
Knox				FM 2279	
Knox				FM 1292	
Knox	Knox City			SH 6	
Knox	Knox City			FM 2701	
Knox				FM 2365	
Knox				FM 1043	
Knox				FM 1043	
Knox				FM 267	
Knox	Munday			FM 2811	
Knox	Munday			US 277	
Haskell				FM 266	
Haskell				FM 1720	
Throckmorton				US 380	
1.000 mi = 1.609 km; 1.000 km = 0.621 mi
