= Texas State Highway 167 =

State Highway 167

Route information
- Maintained by TxDOT
- Length: 0.14 mi (230 m)
- Existed: 2012–present

Major junctions
- West end: US 67 / US 377 near Dublin
- East end: US 67 Bus. near Dublin

Location
- Country: United States
- State: Texas

Highway system
- Highways in Texas; Interstate; US; State; Former; Toll; Loops; Spurs; FM/RM; Park; Rec
← SH 166	→ SH 168

State Highway 167 was designated on October 21, 1931, as a spur from SH 72 (now US 77) to the Monument Hill State Historic Site. The route was redesignated as Spur 92 on May 9, 1940.

The SH 167 designation was assigned on December 13, 2012, as a state highway from SH 267 (now US 67/US 377), to US 67/US 377 (now Bus. US 67). At 750 feet (230 m), it is Texas's shortest main state highway.
