= Texas State Highway 168 =

Highway in Texas

State Highway 168
- SH 168 highlighted in red

Route information
- Maintained by TxDOT
- Length: 0.873 mi (1,405 m)
- Existed: 1985–present

Major junctions
- South end: SH 87 in Galveston
- North end: Entrance gate to U.S. Coast Guard station

Location
- Country: United States
- State: Texas

Highway system
- Highways in Texas; Interstate; US; State; Former; Toll; Loops; Spurs; FM/RM; Park; Rec
← SH 167	→ I-169

State Highway 168 (SH 168) is a short state highway located entirely within the city of Galveston in the U.S. state of Texas. The highway connects SH 87 to Coast Guard Station Galveston, on the eastern portion of Galveston Island. At just under 0.9 miles (1.4 km) in length, SH 168 is the second-shortest Texas state highway. The road travels along the edge of residential area for most of its length before it bends northeast and runs through a small marsh.

The route was first proposed by 1932; it would have traveled through Atascosa and Wilson counties. Portions of the proposal were replaced by SH 97 by at least 1935, while the rest was cancelled. State Highway 87 first followed the routing of SH 168, but was moved by 1961. A short railroad spur was built along the course of the route, and SH 168 was officially designated on October 24, 1985.

== Route description ==
State Highway 168 begins at an at-grade intersection with SH 87, or Ferry Road, on the eastern portion of Galveston Island. The highway runs eastward for a short distance, being bordered by an apartment complex and a small gas station. After bending northward, the road enters rural areas, while following the course of a small, man-made drainage creek. The roadway continues northwest, bordered by marsh and brushland to the east and several resorts and apartment complexes to the west. It bends northeast and proceeds past a small portion of a U.S. Coast Guard station. The route splits away from the creek and continues past Corps Woods Nature Sanctuary, a major birdwatching destination. The highway intersects a small access road to the Coast Guard station, before continuing northward to its northern terminus, the main entrance gate to the Coast Guard facility. A small road continues inside the station from the gate.

== History ==
SH 168 was first proposed on August 4, 1932, traveling from Floresville in Wilson County to SH 81. The proposal was listed as a conditional designation, meaning that it would not be maintained by the State Highway Commission. On January 9, 1933, it was extended to Campbellton in Atascosa County. On February 12, 1934, the portion from Campbellton to Floresville was cancelled and an extension of SH 97 to Floresville was substituted for it. On March 13, 1934, SH 168 was cancelled, as it became part of SH 97. On September 26, 1939, SH 87 was designated to a road that followed the general course of present-day SH 168.

By 1961, the highway had been shifted westward, but a spur of the Gulf, Colorado and Santa Fe Railroad had been constructed along the approximate location of the highway's present route. On October 24, 1985, SH 168 was approved for designation by the Texas Transportation Commission (TTC), and on April 18, 1986 the highway was officially designated by the TxDOT's Administration Circle. At the time, the road was approximately 0.5 miles (0.80 km) in length. By 1994, the highway had been extended to approximately 0.9 miles (1.4 km) in length, due to an extension of its northern terminus.

== Junction list ==
The entire highway is in Galveston, Galveston County.

mi	km	Destinations	Notes
0.000	0.000	SH 87 (Ferry Road) – Crystal Beach	Southern terminus
0.781	1.257	Ferry Point Road	
0.873	1.405	U.S. Coast Guard Station entrance gate	Northern terminus
1.000 mi = 1.609 km; 1.000 km = 0.621 mi
