= Texas State Highway 312 =

Proposed state highway in Texas, U.S.

State Highway 312

Route information
- Maintained by TxDOT
- Existed: 1987–present

Major junctions
- South end: I-69 / US 59
- North end: US 90 Alt. in Sugar Land

Location
- Country: United States
- State: Texas

Highway system
- Highways in Texas; Interstate; US; State; Former; Toll; Loops; Spurs; FM/RM; Park; Rec
| ← SH 311 | → SH 313 |

State Highway 312 (SH 312) is a proposed state highway from US Highway 90 Alternate (Alt. US 90) just west of SH 6 south to Interstate 69/U.S. Highway 59 (I-69/US 59). The highway was originally designated in 1986 as SH 362, and was renumbered as SH 312 in 1987. As of 2020, the highway has yet to be built.

The original SH 312 was designated on March 21, 1939, from Karnes City southwest to the Atascosa–Karnes county line. On September 26, 1939, this became part of SH 80.
