= Texas State Highway 365 =

Planned state highway in Texas

State Highway 365

Route information
- Length: 17.40 mi (28.00 km)
- Existed: 2010–present

Major junctions
- West end: FM 1016 in Mission
- South end: US 281 in Mission

Location
- Country: United States
- State: Texas
- Counties: Hidalgo

Highway system
- Highways in Texas; Interstate; US; State; Former; Toll; Loops; Spurs; FM/RM; Park; Rec
| ← SH 364 | → I-369 |

State Highway 365 (SH 365) is a future toll road that is under construction in Mission, Texas. The route will run from FM 1016 to US 281 and will provide an alternate route for heavy commercial vehicles. The highway is expected to become of the proposed 102 mi (164 km) Hidalgo County Loop.

== Route description ==
SH 365 is planned to begin at an intersection with FM 1016. From there, it will head east and south to US 281.

== History ==
State Highway 365
- Location: San Patricio County
- Existed: February 24, 1988–October 13, 1988

SH 365 was designated on February 24, 1988, as a route from SH 361 in Ingleside to SH 35 at Aransas Pass. On October 13, 1988, the route was cancelled and became an extension of SH 363.

SH 365 was designated on April 29, 2010, but only from FM 1016 to FM 3072. On July 26, 2012, SH 365 was extended south to US 281, completing the proposed routing. In March 2016, the Hidalgo County Regional Mobility Authority (HCRMA) has commenced construction on phase one of segment 3 of the Hidalgo County loop (SH 365) in Hidalgo County. The highway, which will run from the Anzalduas Port of Entry to the Pharr–Reynosa International Bridge is expected to be completed by September 25, 2025. The highway is now expected to be completed by 2027 after delays.

== Major junctions ==
The entire route is in Hidalgo County.

| Location | mi | km | Destinations | Notes |
|---|---|---|---|---|
| Mission | 0.00 | 0.00 | FM 1016 (Conway Avenue) | Future western terminus |
| Mission | | | FM 396 – Anzalduas International Bridge | |
| Mission | | | FM 494 (Shary Road) | |
| Mission | | | Ware Road | Future eastbound exit and westbound entrance |
| Mission | | | Spur 115 (23rd Street) / SH 336 (10th Street) – Hidalgo International Bridge | SH 336 not signed eastbound |
| Mission | | | FM 2061 (Jackson Road) | |
| Mission | | | US 281 (Cage Boulevard) | |
| Mission | | | FM 3072 (Dicker Road) / Anaya Road / I Road | Anaya Road and I Road not signed eastbound; Las Milpas Road signed eastbound |
| Mission | | | SH 68 north – Edinburg | Future southern terminus of SH 68 |
| Mission | | | Hiline Road | Anaya Road signed eastbound |
| Mission | | | US 281 (Military Highway) | |
| Mission | 16.53 | 26.60 | Spur 29 | Future southern terminus |
1.000 mi = 1.609 km; 1.000 km = 0.621 mi: Unopened
