= Texas State Highway 51 =

State highway in Texas

State Highway 51

Route information
- Maintained by TxDOT
- Length: 5.758 mi (9.267 km)
- Existed: 1974–present

Major junctions
- West end: SH 207 near Spearman
- East end: FM 281 / FM 760 south of Spearman

Location
- Country: United States
- State: Texas
- Counties: Hansford

Highway system
- Highways in Texas; Interstate; US; State; Former; Toll; Loops; Spurs; FM/RM; Park; Rec
← SH 50	→ SH 52

State Highway 51 (SH 51) is a short state highway located entirely in Hansford County, Texas, just south of Spearman.

== Route description ==
SH 51 begins at SH 207 southeast of Spearman and travels east through unincorporated Hansford County approximately 5.7 miles (9.2 km). It is a two-lane route for its entire length, and has no intersections with other state-maintained routes until its terminus at FM 281, which continues to the east and south, and FM 760, which travels north to Spearman.

== History ==
The original SH 51 was designated on August 21, 1923, as a route from Sagerton to Crowell, replacing a portion of SH 28. On June 15, 1926, it was extended north to the Oklahoma state line. On December 21, 1926, it was to extend to Longworth, but the conditions were not met for the designation to take effect. The south end was modified several times. It was cancelled on January 19, 1932, being replaced by SH 16.

The second SH 51 was designated on April 5, 1932, as a route from Dalhart northward to the Oklahoma state line. It was extended south to McCamey on July 16, 1934, replacing SH 143 from Channing to Meadow and the majority of SH 137 from Meadow to McCamey. On July 15, 1935, the section from Channing to Levelland was cancelled (as it was not built yet). On December 22, 1936, this section was restored. On November 23, 1937, SH 51 was rerouted to bypass Meadow. On February 4, 1941, the section of SH 51 from the Hockley–Terry county line to Brownfield was cancelled, creating a gap. On February 28, 1941, the section from the Hockley–Terry county line to the Hockley–Lamb county line was cancelled, increasing the gap. On May 14, 1941, the section from the Hockley–Terry county line to Brownfield was restored, partially closing the gap. On September 23, 1941, the section from Levelland to the Hockley–Terry county line was restored, closing the gap further. On April 28, 1942, it was extended south to Sheffield. On September 22, 1942, to section of SH 51 from Levelland to the Hockley–Lamb county line was restored, closing the gap. On October 24, 1956, the highway was rerouted southwest over FM 1214 from US 290 to US 90 and SH 227 from US 90 to the entrance of Big Bend National Park. The section from Rankin to Sheffield was transferred to SH 349. This entire route was canceled on August 28, 1958, when US 385 was transferred to the west.

The current SH 51 was designated on January 29, 1974; its routing has remained unchanged.

== Major intersections ==
The entire route is in Hansford County.

Location	mi	km	Destinations	Notes
	0.0	0.0	SH 207 – Spearman, Stinnett	Western terminus
	5.7	9.2	FM 281 / FM 760 – Spearman	Eastern terminus
1.000 mi = 1.609 km; 1.000 km = 0.621 mi
