= Utah State Route 166 =

State Route 166

Location
- Country: United States
- State: Utah

Highway system
- Utah State Highway System; Interstate; US; State; Minor; Scenic
← SR-165	→ SR-167

Utah State Route 166 may refer to:

- Utah State Route 166 (1969-1990), a former state highway in the Ogden Valley in eastern Weber County, Utah, United States that connected from Utah State Route 39 in Huntsville to Eden
- Utah State Route 166 (1933-1969), a former state highway in Daggett County, Utah, United States, that connected the Ashley National Forest with Utah State Route 43 "west of Antelope Canal"

== See also ==
- List of state highways in Utah
- List of highways numbered 166
