= Morton Valley, Texas =

- Unincorporated community
- Location in Texas Morton Valley (the United States)
- Coordinates: 32°28′16″N 98°49′00″W
- Country: United States
- State: Texas
- County: Eastland
- Elevation: 1,598 ft (487 m)
- Time zone: UTC-6 (Central (CST))
  - Summer (DST): UTC-5 (CDT)
- GNIS feature ID: 1341958

Morton Valley is an unincorporated community in Eastland County, Texas, United States. It lies on SH-112, 6 miles (9.7 km) north of Eastland.

== History ==
Morton Valley is a ranching community with ruins of an old school house.
