= Texas State Highway 68 =

State highway in Texas

State Highway 68

Route information
- Maintained by TxDOT
- Existed: 2013–present

Major junctions
- South end: SH 365 Toll in San Juan
- I-2 / US 83 in Donna
- North end: I-69C / US 281 in Edinburg

Location
- Country: United States
- State: Texas
- Counties: Hidalgo

Highway system
- Highways in Texas; Interstate; US; State; Former; Toll; Loops; Spurs; FM/RM; Park; Rec
← SH 67	→ I-69

State Highway 68 (SH 68) is a proposed state highway in the U.S. state of Texas. The route will run from I-69C/US 281 in Edinburg, intersecting I-2/US 83 in Donna, to the future SH 365 toll road in San Juan.

== History ==
The route was originally designated on August 21, 1923 to replace SH 10A between Stephenville and Dallas. In 1932, the portion from Stephenville to Dallas was cosigned with US 67. Another section was designated on March 22, 1938 from Eastland to Lingleville. On October 25, 1938, it was extended to Stephenville. On January 23, 1939, SH 68 was rerouted west to Gorman. On September 26, 1939, the section from Stephenville to Dallas was cosigned with US 67, so the SH 68 designation was dropped from this section. On March 26, 1942, the remaining route was deleted in favor of the newly formed Farm to Market Road system, with part being redesignated FM 8.

The current SH 68 designation was assigned on February 28, 2013, consisting of the segment from I-69C/US 281 Edinburg to I-2/US 83 in Donna. On August 16, 2023, TxDOT approved a southern extension of SH 68, to run southward from I-2/US 83 in Donna and then westward, partly concurrent with FM 3072, to the proposed SH 365 toll road.
