= Texas State Highway 164 =

State highway in Texas

State Highway 164
- SH 164 highlighted in red

Route information
- Maintained by TxDOT
- Length: 54.42 mi (87.58 km)
- Existed: by 1933–present

Major junctions
- West end: SH 6 at Hallsburg
- I-45 at Buffalo
- East end: SH 75 at Buffalo

Location
- Country: United States
- State: Texas

Highway system
- Highways in Texas; Interstate; US; State; Former; Toll; Loops; Spurs; FM/RM; Park; Rec
| ← SH 163 | → SH 165 |

State Highway 164 (SH 164) is a Texas state highway that runs from near Waco to Buffalo. The route was originally designated on September 17, 1930 from SH 6 to the town of Mart, and was extended to Groesbeck on August 15, 1933. On July 15, 1935, the east end was cut back to the Limestone County line. On February 11, 1937, the section from the Limestone County line to Groesbeck was restored. SH 164 extended to Buffalo on November 16, 1937.

== Major intersections ==
| County | Location | mi | km | Destinations | Notes |
|---|---|---|---|---|---|
| McLennan | | | | SH 6 | |
| McLennan | | | | FM 339 | |
| Limestone | Groesbeck | | | SH 14 | |
| Limestone | | | | FM 1953 | |
| Limestone | | | | FM 3371 | |
| Limestone | | | | FM 39 | |
| Freestone | Donie | | | FM 80 | |
| Leon | Buffalo | | | I-45 – Dallas, Huntsville | I-45 exit 180. |
| Leon | Buffalo | | | SH 75 | |
1.000 mi = 1.609 km; 1.000 km = 0.621 mi
