= Texas State Highway 57 =

State highway in Texas

State Highway 57

Route information
- Maintained by TxDOT
- Length: 1.474 mi (2.372 km)
- Existed: 1994–present

Major junctions
- West end: SH 155 in Tyler
- East end: FM 2493 in Tyler

Location
- Country: United States
- State: Texas
- Counties: Smith

Highway system
- Highways in Texas; Interstate; US; State; Former; Toll; Loops; Spurs; FM/RM; Park; Rec
← US 57	→ SH 58

State Highway 57 (SH 57) is a 1.474-mile (2.372 km) Texas state highway located in Tyler.

== Route description ==
SH 57 begins at an intersection with SH 155 in southwestern Tyler. The route travels to the east before ending at FM 2493. The roadway continues under local maintenance as Grande Boulevard. SH 57 is four lanes with a center turn lane for its entire length.

== History ==
Historic SH 57

SH 57 was originally designated on August 21, 1923, on a route along the Gulf Coast from Rockport to Gregory, replacing part of SH 12, which was relocated to the west. On March 19, 1928, the route was extended to east of Blessing. On April 25, 1929, a section from Corpus Christi to Chapman Ranch was added. On March 19, 1930, the section from Corpus Christi to Chapman Ranch became part of SH 96. On October 21, 1930, SH 57 was rerouted to end in Palacios. On April 10, 1934, this route was cancelled, as it became part of SH 35.

Historic SH 57

The SH 57 designation was once again used beginning on August 5, 1966, on a route from Eagle Pass to near Moore, as a renumbering of SH 76 and to coincide with Mexican Federal Highway 57. This route would be renumbered US 57 on August 31, 1970.

The current SH 57 was designated on February 21, 1994. There are plans for the highway to be extended west to connect with Segment 3 of the under construction Loop 49.

== Major intersections ==
The entire route is in Tyler, Smith County.

mi	km	Destinations	Notes
0.000	0.000	SH 155 (Frankston Highway) – Frankston	Western terminus
1.474	2.372	FM 2493 (Old Jacksonville Highway) – Bullard	Eastern terminus; roadway continues as West Grande Boulevard
1.000 mi = 1.609 km; 1.000 km = 0.621 mi
