= Texas State Highway 165 =

Highway in Texas

State Highway 165
- SH 165 highlighted in red

Route information
- Maintained by TxDOT
- Length: 0.512 mi (824 m)
- Existed: 1930–present

Major junctions
- South end: 7th Street in Austin
- North end: Texas State Cemetery in Austin

Location
- Country: United States
- State: Texas

Highway system
- Highways in Texas; Interstate; US; State; Former; Toll; Loops; Spurs; FM/RM; Park; Rec
← SH 164	→ SH 166

State Highway 165 (SH 165) is a state highway in the U.S. state of Texas that runs to and within the Texas State Cemetery in Austin. The 0.5-mile-long (0.80 km) route is the shortest primary state highway in Texas, and it is perhaps the only one partially locked at night. It is no longer connected to any other roads on the state highway system.

== Route description ==
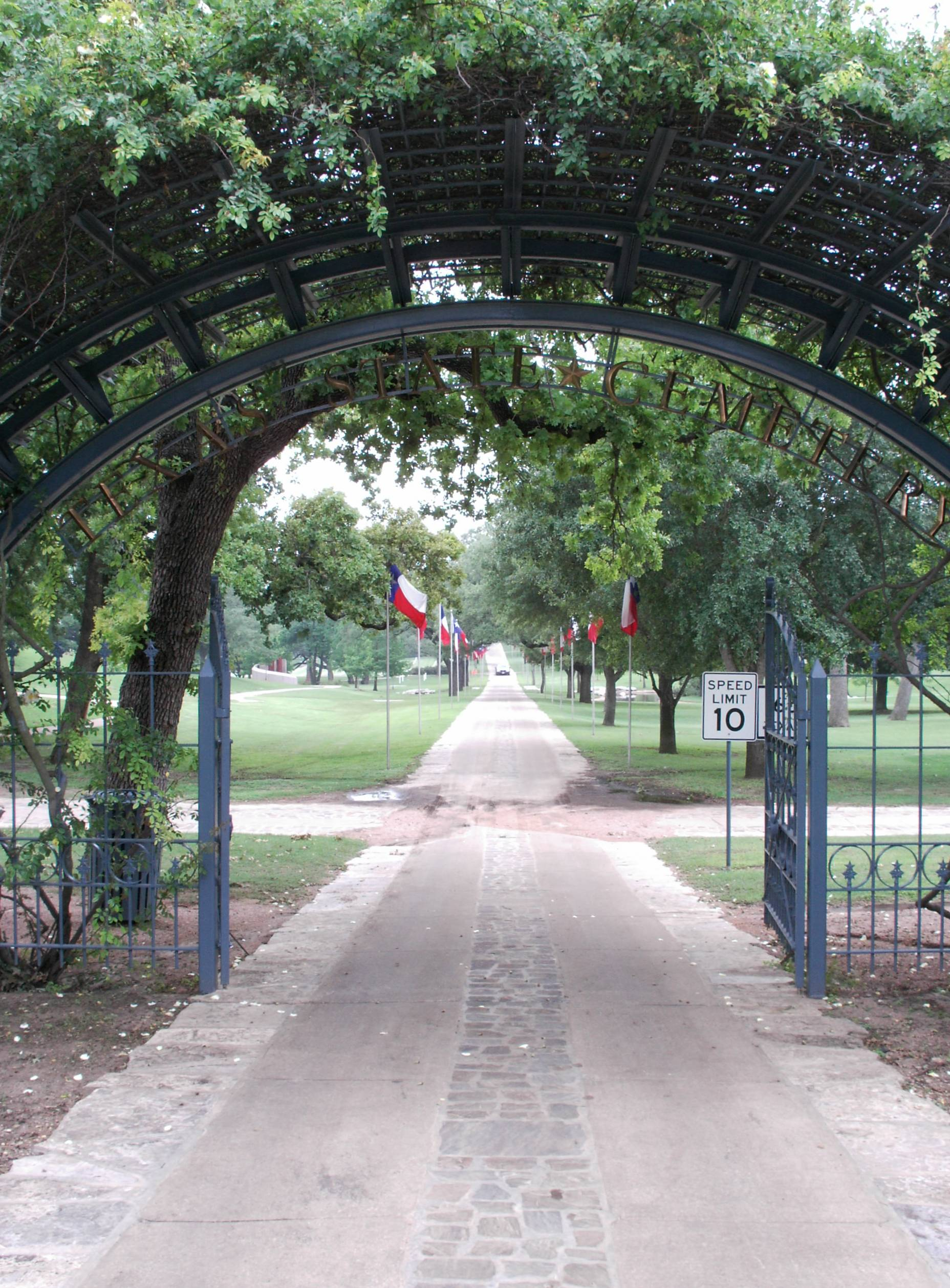
State Highway 165, viewed from the north gate of the cemetery.

Officially, SH 165 runs north along Comal Street from 7th Street into and within the Texas State Cemetery in Austin. As of January 2023, it is signed only within the cemetery, while the Comal Street portion is unsigned. The posted speed limit for the highway is 10 miles per hour (16 km/h).

== History ==
SH 165 was designated on February 26, 1930 from 6th and Onion streets to 11th Street. It was numbered SH 165 on August 1, 1930. In 1932, Texas historian Louis Kemp brought the neglected Texas State Cemetery to the attention of officials at the Texas Highway Department. At the time, the 22-acre (8.9 ha) site, located just east of current Downtown Austin, had no road access. The Highway Department established a highway to the cemetery and created and paved roads through it. The highway to the cemetery was also previously known informally as the "Lou Kemp Highway".

Prior to its truncation, the SH 165 designation began at various times at SH 20 and U.S. Route 290 (US 290) in central Austin, and at Loop 343. On November 20, 1939, SH 165 was truncated from 6th Street to 7th Street. In 1965, SH 165 was truncated to Comal Street from 7th Street to the entrance of the Texas State Cemetery; at that time, Loop 343 ran along 7th Street (which borders the cemetery). In 1977, the eastern section of Loop 343, including the routing along 7th Street, was decommissioned, disconnecting SH 165 from the rest of the state highway system. However, the Texas State Cemetery and SH 165 are located just six blocks east of Interstate 35 (I-35).

== Major intersections ==
The entire route is in Austin, Travis County.

mi	km	Destinations	Notes
0.0	0.0	7th Street	Comal Street continues south
0.512	0.824	11th Street	
1.000 mi = 1.609 km; 1.000 km = 0.621 mi
