= U.S. Route 164 =

U.S. Route 164 may refer to:

- U.S. Route 164 (Texas–Oklahoma) from Amarillo, Texas to Enid, Oklahoma; became part of US 60 in 1930
- U.S. Route 164 (Arizona–Colorado) from near Tuba City, Arizona to Cortez, Colorado; became part of US 160 in about 1970
