= Texas State Highway 166 =

State highway in Texas

State Highway 166
- SH 166 highlighted in red

Route information
- Maintained by TxDOT
- Length: 43.089 mi (69.345 km)
- Existed: 1927–present
- Tourist routes: Davis Mountains State Park Highway
- Restrictions: 10' maximum width between SH 118 and FM 505

Major junctions
- West end: SH 118
- RM 505
- East end: SH 17 near Fort Davis

Location
- Country: United States
- State: Texas
- Counties: Jeff Davis

Highway system
- Highways in Texas; Interstate; US; State; Former; Toll; Loops; Spurs; FM/RM; Park; Rec
← SH 165	→ SH 167

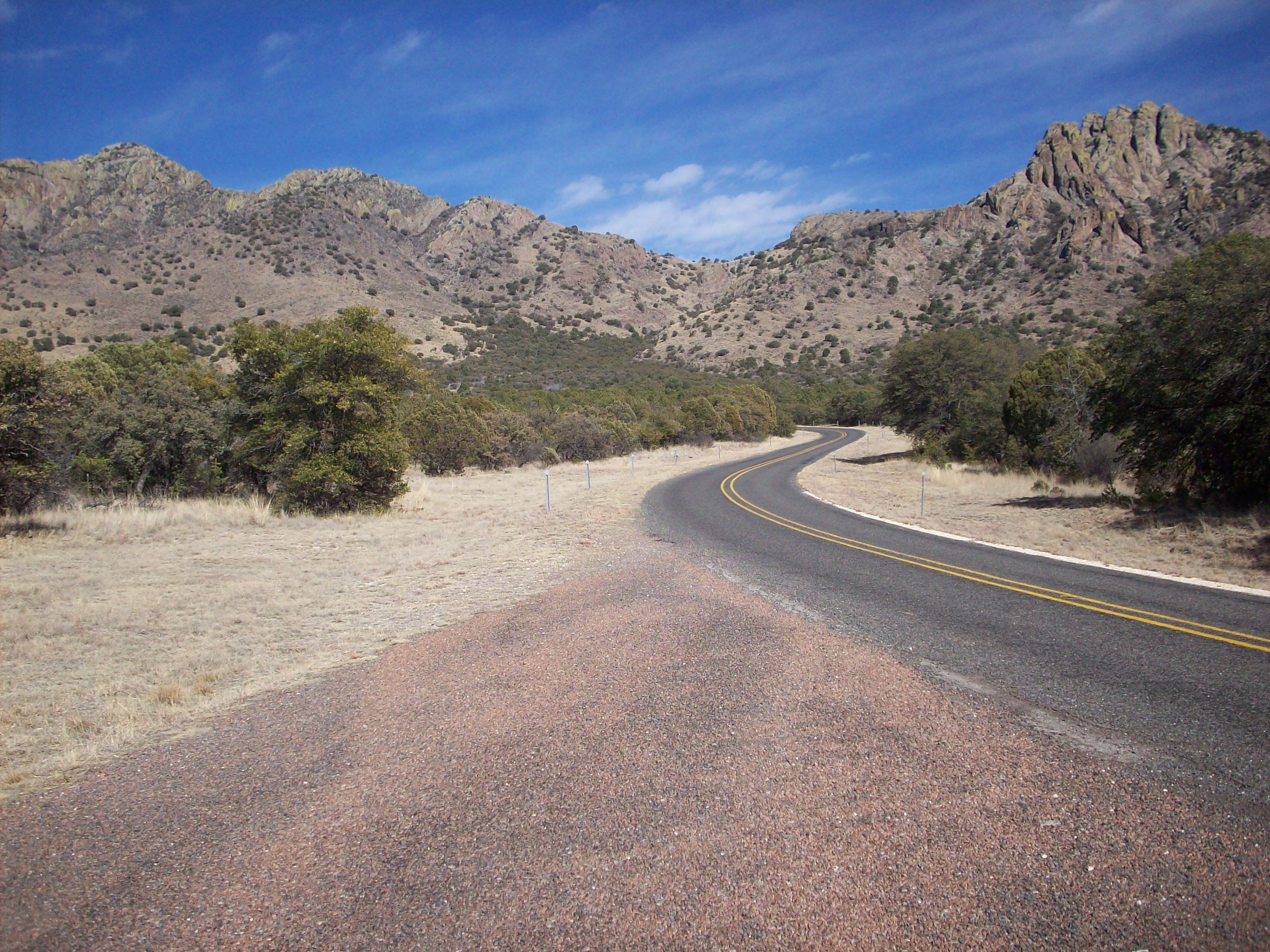
SH 166 near Sawtooth Mountain in western Jeff Davis County

State Highway 166 (SH 166) runs for 43.0 miles (69.2 km) from SH 118 near Nunn Hill in northern Jeff Davis County, Texas passing around a major portion of the Davis Mountains before ending at SH 17 about two miles south of Fort Davis. The highway is maintained by the Texas Department of Transportation (TxDOT).

The scenic highway was originally a longer loop around the mountain range and was envisioned in 1927 as a "state park highway" until an actual state park could be established in the area. SH 166 facilitated construction of Davis Mountains State Park and the University of Texas at Austin's McDonald Observatory during the 1930s.

SH 166 is located entirely within Jeff Davis County and forms part of the route linking Fort Davis, the county seat, to Valentine, the county's only incorporated town. The highway link to Valentine is the only highway intersection between the termini of SH 166, and the rural route does not pass through any cities or towns.

== History ==
In 1923, the Texas Legislature directed the State Parks Board, a predecessor agency to today's Texas Parks and Wildlife Department, to consider the Davis Mountains as the location of a new major destination park. After the parks board was initially unable to acquire appropriations or land donations for a park, the Legislature in 1927 instructed the Texas Highway Department, a TxDOT predecessor, to build the Davis Mountains State Park Highway on donated right of way. On September 15, 1930, the effects of the Great Depression finally encouraged local landowners to donate land for the proposed park to stimulate the local economy. The road had been designated on September 15, 1930, from Fort Davis as far as the Fowlkes Ranch enabling construction of nearby McDonald Observatory and Davis Mountains State Park. On September 23, 1931, a survey was made for the location. On April 24, 1933, SH 166 Spur to Mount Locke observatory was added.

By 1939, the route had been extended to make a complete loop around the highest portion of the Davis Mountains ending at its point of origin in Fort Davis. The highway at that time shared the route of SH 17 through Fort Davis and SH 118 was extended over the northern portion of the highway to Kent and over SH 233 (which was cancelled) north of SH 166. SH 166 Spur was renumbered as Spur 78. On January 24, 1941, the route designation between Fort Davis and Nunn Hill was canceled with that stretch retaining its designation as SH 118.

== Route description ==
The road is within Jeff Davis County, and its entire length is part of the Davis Mountains Scenic Loop along with portions of SH 17 and SH 118. The route begins at SH 118 near Nunn Hill approximately 19 miles northeast of Fort Davis. Nearly the entire length of the road is through ranch land. The route travels southeast 20.1 miles (32.3 km) through winding, mountainous canyons until intersecting Ranch to Market Road 505 to U.S. Route 90 and Valentine. During this portion of its route, the road has narrow lanes and grassy shoulders.

At RM 505, the highway becomes part of the primary route between Valentine and Fort Davis, the only two towns in the county. Past this junction, the route turns eastward, and the roadway improves with paved shoulders and wider lanes for the remaining 22.9 miles (36.9 km) until its terminus at SH 17 about 2 miles (3 km) south of Fort Davis.

There are no towns along the route. The road's right-of-way is not fenced through many pastures, and loose livestock on the roadway present a hazard to motorists. Much of the route offers views of Baldy Peak atop Mount Livermore, the highest summit in the Davis Mountains.

== Major intersections ==
The entire route is in Jeff Davis County.

Location	mi	km	Destinations	Notes
	0.0	0.0	SH 118 – Kent, Fort Davis	Western terminus
	9.7	15.6	Sawtooth Mountain picnic table	
	20.1	32.3	RM 505 – Valentine	
	33.8	54.4	Point of Rocks roadside park	
	42.9	69.0	SH 17 – Fort Davis, Marfa	Eastern terminus
1.000 mi = 1.609 km; 1.000 km = 0.621 mi
