= Lake Leon (Texas) =

Lake in Texas

Coordinates: 32°21′45″N 98°41′54″W

The Location of Eastland County in Texas, USA

Lake Leon is located in Eastland County and was created by the State Board of Water Engineers by impounding the Leon River. In reference to Abilene, Texas with a population of around 125,000, it is 68 miles (109 kilometers) east, and in reference to Eastland, Texas with a population of around 4,000, it is 10 miles (16 kilometers) southeast. Lake Leon is found in the Brazos River and in the Cross Timbers ecoregion, more specifically the Cross Timbers Grand Prairie ecoregion.

== Hydrology ==
The river which filled Lake Leon is called the Leon River which also serves as its namesake, but the drainage area is over 250 square miles (650 square kilometers). The surface area is 736 acres (298 hectares), a maximum depth of 55 feet (17 meters), an elevation above sea level of 1,382 feet (421 meters), and a capacity of 28,042 acre-feet. Aside from decreasing water levels due to hot, dry summer months, the water level is not susceptible to fluctuation. According to the Eastland County Water Supply District, the turbidity varies from visibility to 4 feet (1.2 meters) to slightly stained.

== History ==
On July 8, 1952, the State Board of Water Engineers permitted the creation of Lake Leon. On January 13, 1953, the dam started construction, and the dam was efficiently blocking the waterway by April 1954. In June 1954, the dam was finished. Eastland County Water Supply District still uses Lake Leon both municipally and industrially as a water sources.

== Recreation ==
=== Fishing ===
In 1975, Florida largemouth bass entered Lake Leon, and since then the reservoir has become recognized for largemouth bass tournament fishing. Lake Leon also has channel catfish, sunfish, and white bass. There are no fishing regulations specific to Lake Leon, so statewide regulations are all applicable.

Rating of fish status in Lake Leon
Species	Poor	Fair	Good	Excellent
Largemouth bass				X
Catfish			X	
Crappie			X	
White bass			X	
Sunfish		X		

=== Boating ===
Lake Leon does provide a boat dock for those that wish to use their boats recreationally.

== Wildlife ==
=== Fauna ===
The most populous fish are:

- largemouth bass
- white crappie
- channel catfish
- flathead catfish
- white bass

=== Flora ===
The most populous hydrophilic vegetations are:

- floating-leaf pondweed
- bulrush
- water willow
