= State Highway 164 (Tamil Nadu) =

Road in Tamil Nadu, India

State Highway 164

Route information
- Maintained by Highways and Minor Ports Department

Major junctions
- From: Coimbatore, Tamil Nadu
- To: Anaikatti, Coimbatore district, Tamil Nadu

Location
- Country: India
- State: Tamil Nadu
- Districts: Coimbatore, Tamilnadu

Highway system
- Roads in India; Expressways; National; State; Asian; State Highways in Tamil Nadu

Map

State Highway 164 runs in Coimbatore District of Tamil Nadu, India. It connects Coimbatore with Anaikatti. It passes through Thadagam road.

== Junctions ==
The highway meets the following arterial roads along the way:

- National Highway 181 at Goundampalayam
- State Highway 167 at KNG pirivu
