= Aberfoyle, Texas =

- Unincorporated community
- Location within Texas
- Coordinates: 33°18′18″N 96°1′31″W
- Country: United States
- State: Texas
- County: Hunt
- Elevation: 604 ft (184 m)
- Time zone: UTC-6 (Central (EST))
  - Summer (DST): UTC-5 (CDT)
- Area codes: 430 and 903
- GNIS feature ID: 1350850

Aberfoyle is an unincorporated community in Hunt County, Texas, United States. The community is located fifteen miles to the northeast of Greenville.
