= List of former Texas state highways =

Below is a list and summary of some of the deleted state highways (i.e., those with no current routing) as outlined by the Texas Department of Transportation designation files, indicated by having zero current mileage.

== SH 1 ==
State Highway 1 ran from El Paso through Dallas to Texarkana. It was the first highway designated in 1917. In 1926, the United States Highway System was designated, with US 80 colocated from El Paso to Dallas and US 67 from Dallas to Texarkana. On September 26, 1939, the dual designations were removed, leaving SH 1 only on a small stretch west of Dallas. This section was redesignated as Loop 260 on August 20, 1952. Since that time, the number "may only be assigned by the Executive Director of the Texas Department of Transportation or the Transportation Commission."

== SH 2 ==
State Highway 2 was designated in 1917, running from Wichita Falls southeast to Fort Worth. The route then split in two at Waco, with one branch travelling southwest through Austin and San Antonio before ending at Laredo, while the eastern branch traveled southeast through Houston, ending at Galveston. The eastern branch was transferred to SH 6 on August 21, 1923, to avoid having two separate highways with the same number. The western route was assigned the US 81 routing in 1926. The co-designation with US 81 was dropped completely on September 26, 1939.

== SH 13 ==
State Highway 13 was designated in 1917, running through the Texas Panhandle along the Ozark Trail. It generally referenced the routing due west from Amarillo to the New Mexico state line. In 1926, US 66 was co-located along the route. The co-designation was dropped completely on September 26, 1939.

== SH 28 ==
State Highway 28 was designated on September 13, 1917, on a route that ran across the southern Texas Panhandle from Farwell to Mineral Wells. On January 20, 1919, a branch, SH 28A, was designated from Crowell through Vernon to the Oklahoma border. By August 21, 1922, a branch to Sagerton was added. On August 21, 1923, the section from Crowell to Sagerton was renumbered as SH 51 and the branch to Jacksboro was renumbered as SH 24, with the section of the branch from Jacksboro to Mineral Wells already part of SH 25. SH 28 was instead rerouted over SH 28A through Vernon to the Oklahoma border. US 70 was co-located along the entire route, except for the small branch northeast of Vernon. This branch was assigned to US 183 in 1939.

On August 4, 1932, SH 28 Loop was designated through Lockney. On August 1, 1936, a SH 28 Spur was added on top of the SH 28 Loop. On November 16, 1937, another SH 28 Spur was designated in Olton. All co-designations with US Routes were removed completely on September 26, 1939. SH 28 Spur and SH 28 Loop became Spur 9 (Olton) and Loop 75 (Lockney).

== SH 38 ==
State Highway 38 has been designated three times. The first route was proposed on May 20, 1918, from Greenville north and east through Honey Grove to the Oklahoma border, but that was deferred. The route was finally designated on June 17, 1918, from Greenville to SH 5 at an unknown point north of Wolfe City. On August 20, 1918, the route was extended to the Red River and was decided to cross SH 5 at Honey Grove. On February 18, 1919, the route extended south to Terrell. On April 20, 1919, the route extended southwest to Ennis. On August 21, 1923, the sections south of Kaufman and north of Greenville were cancelled. On December 17, 1923, this route was cancelled, as it became the northern extension of SH 34. The route was re-designated as a spur from SH 43 to Beckville. On October 20, 1924, this route became part of rerouted SH 8.

The route was re-designated on January 22, 1930, on a route from Sugar Land southeast to Alvin. On June 25, 1930, it extended southeast to Galveston over part of SH 58. SH 38 Spur was designated on April 25, 1933, to Sugarland. On September 26, 1939, this routing became the southern extension of SH 6 when it was rerouted around the western side of Houston. SH 38 Spur was renumbered Spur 58.

SH 38A was designated on February 17, 1919, from Ladonia to Paris. On August 21, 1923, this route was cancelled.

== SH 52 ==
State Highway 52 was designated on August 21, 1923, from Hedley through Wellington to the Oklahoma border as a renumbering of a section of SH 13. The March 19, 1930, log only showed the section from Wellington to Oklahoma, but erroneously omitted the section from Wellington to Hedley. On November 30, 1932, the section of SH 52 from Wellington to Hedley was put back on the state highway log. The section west of Wellington was renumbered again as SH 203 on March 13, 1934, and this numbering replaced the rest of SH 52 on September 26, 1945.

== SH 58 ==
State Highway 58 has been designated twice. It was first designated on August 21, 1923, over a route from Ganado through Bay City, Columbia, and Angleton to a point on the mainland just east of Galveston, replacing SH 19A. On March 19, 1928, the western portion of the route was rerouted to the Army Camp near Palacios from Bay City. The eastern portion was rerouted through Alvin between Angleton and Galveston. on February 20, 1929, the section from Ganado to Midfield was restored as a state highway, with no number, and this was eliminated on March 19, 1930. On June 25, 1930, the route was truncated to end at Alvin as the route from Alvin to Galveston was transferred to SH 38. By 1935, the route designation was canceled, and the highway was added to SH 35 as an extension.

The second designation was in 2009 on a connecting route in Midland. The route in Midland was designated on May 28, 2009. Construction of the new roadway between Cotton Flat Rd. and Carter Ave. began in May 2010. It was completed by June 30, 2011, but it was cancelled that day. This route became Business State Highway 158-B in 2011 when it was rerouted.

== SH 69 ==
State Highway 69 has been designated twice. It was first designated on August 21, 1923, from Cameron to Hearne as a renumbering of SH 36A. By 1933, it received a co-designation with US Route 190. The state designation was removed on September 26, 1939. The second designation was on August 4, 1971, near Eastland as a renumbering of a section of SH 6 when it was rerouted further west. On August 28, 1991, SH 69 extended east to I-20, replacing part of US 80 which was decommissioned west of Dallas. The route was renumbered SH 112 on September 14, 1992, due to numerous thefts of the highway signs.

== SH 74 ==
State Highway 74 has been designated twice. It was first designated on August 21, 1923, on a route from Brady through Lampasas to Georgetown as a renumbering of SH 36B. On January 21, 1924, the road was rerouted directly from San Saba to Lometa, with the section of the old route from San Saba to Goldthwaite canceled and the remainder of the old route designated as SH 74A. On June 5, 1933, the section from near the Burnet/Williamson county line to Georgetown was redesignated as SH 195. SH 74 was extended south to SH 29 at Liberty Hill instead. In 1935, US 190 was co-located with the highway from Brady to Lampasas.On July 15, 1935, the section from SH 195 to Liberty Hill was canceled. This section was restored on April 28, 1937 (and is on the March 1, 1936, map). The co-designation was removed on September 26, 1939, leaving the section from Lampasas to Liberty Hill. This section was replaced by US 183 on May 23, 1951, when its route was adjusted through Texas. The second designation was on June 27, 1995, as a route across the southern portion of Dallas/Fort Worth International Airport. This route, also known as the East-West Connector, has not been constructed, but remains designated. A public meeting took place on July 30, 2015.

SH 74A was designated on January 21, 1924, from Lometa to Goldthwaite to replace part of SH 74, which was rerouted to bypass Goldthwaite. On February 21, 1938, SH 74A Business was designated in Goldthwaite. On September 26, 1939, the route was renumbered SH 284 (now US 183), and SH 74A Business was renumbered as Loop 15.

== SH 76 ==
State Highway 76 has been designated twice. It was first designated on August 21, 1923, from Nacogdoches northeast to the Louisiana border as a renumbering of a portion of SH 22. On October 26, 1932, this route had become the eastern extension of SH 7.

That same day, SH 76 was instead proposed on a route from Eagle Pass northeast to Batesville. The route was proposed to be extended further northeast to near Moore on December 22, 1936. On May 19, 1942, the section east of La Pryor was cancelled. On October 25, 1947, It extended to the Mexico border. On September 26, 1950, the section from Eagle Pass to Mexico was transferred to US 277. On October 30, 1964, SH 76 extended northeast to Moore, replacing FM 394 on that route. On August 5, 1966, the route was transferred to SH 57 (now US 57).

== SH 88 ==
State Highway 88 was designated on August 21, 1923, as a route across the Texas Panhandle from Clarendon north to the Oklahoma border near Spearman as a renumbering of SH 33B. On March 28, 1927, the section from Spearman to Pampa was cancelled. On January 18, 1935, SH 88 extended south to Turkey. On July 15, 1935, this extension was cancelled (as it was not built yet). On April 19, 1938, SH 88 was extended back to Turkey. On May 24, 1938, the route became the northern extension of then-SH 18 (now SH 70).

== SH 106 ==
State Highway 106 was designated on May 4, 1925, as a route from Crockett to Corrigan in East Texas. On September 7, 1927, the route was extended southeast to reach Woodville, and was completed by 1936. On September 26, 1939, the route was transferred to US 287, with the Texas Highway designation removed.

== SH 109 ==
State Highway 109 has been designated twice. The first route was designated on July 27, 1925, on a new route from Smithville south to Yoakum. On August 10, 1925, SH 109 was extended to Westhoff. On June 20, 1927, the south end was shortened to Hochheim. On August 1, 1930, the north end was truncated to Flatonia. On September 15, 1930, it was extended back to Smithville. On April 6, 1932, this route had become the southern extension of SH 95.

The route was instead proposed that same day (numbered one day after designation) as a connector route between Bronte and Ballinger, but was not completed until 1940. The route became the new eastern extension of SH 158 on August 16, 1948, due to adjustment to US 277.

== SH 113 ==
State Highway 113 was designated on August 24, 1925, as a route from Victoria south across Aransas Bay to Rockport. On February 22, 1928, the section southwest of Austwell was cancelled in exchange for extending SH 59 over most of this portion. On January 22, 1940, SH 113 was truncated to Tivoli. On October 22, 1940, SH 113 was extended back to Austwell. The route became the eastern extension of SH 239 on November 25, 1975.

== SH 116 ==
State Highway 116 has been designated twice. The first route was designated on April 12, 1926, on a new route from Dallas due north through Celina to Gunter. On February 24, 1930, SH 116 was extended north to US 82/SH 5. On October 24, 1932, it was rerouted to go northeast from Gunter. On September 19, 1933, it was rerouted to go north from Gunter to near Sherman. On March 26, 1934, it was rerouted to go north directly from Gunter. On April 10, 1934, this route became the northern extension of SH 14 (now SH 289).

The route was again designated on March 31, 1955, on an existing route from Lubbock west through Levelland to the New Mexico state line as a renumbering of SH 290, to match the numbering of NM 116, which was renumbered from NM 92 that same day "for the convenience of the traveling public". This route became the western extension of SH 114 on December 14, 1977, and NM 116 was renumbered NM 114.

== SH 117 ==
State Highway 117 has been designated twice. The first route was designated on July 13, 1926, from Spearman via Plemons to the Canadian River. Two weeks later, SH 117 was extended to the 6666 Ranch, with the intention of extending it further to Panhandle. On March 28, 1927, it extended to Claude, with the portion south of Panhandle replacing the duplicate SH 102, which already existed elsewhere. On February 21, 1928, it was extended to Perryton. On March 19, 1930, SH 117 was extended to the Oklahoma border, replacing part of SH 136 (which was concurrent with SH 117 from Stinnett to Perryton). The route was renumbered as SH 15 on October 26, 1954, to coordinate with OK-15, which the highway became after crossing the Oklahoma border. The second route was designated on February 23, 1983, on a route from Pleasanton east to Karnes City. The route was never constructed, and was cancelled on October 31, 1996, when Atascosa and Karnes counties withdrew their support of the route.

== SH 120 ==
State Highway 120 was designated on February 14, 1927, as a connector route between Aspermont and Newcastle as a renumbering of the duplicate Texas State Highway 107. In March 1929, the road was not yet taken over east of Newcastle, but that was taken over shortly after that. On June 25, 1929, the west end was truncated to Rule. The extension west to Aspermont was restored on December 1, 1930, but removed again on October 20, 1931. On July 2, 1932, the extension west to Aspermont was added back. On November 30, 1932, the route was completed as a graded earth road, with an extension south to Brad. On July 15, 1935, the route was truncated, so that its east end was in Graham. On November 14, 1935, a section from Brad to Strawn was added, but this did not happen until 1938/1939, when SH 89 between Strawn and Weatherford was surfaced. On June 16, 1936, the section from Graham to Brad was restored, connecting the sections. The route was transferred to SH 24, which was rerouted west, and SH 16 (originally planned to be SH 81), which was extended north, on September 26, 1939.

== SH 122 ==
State Highway 122 has been designated twice. The first route designated on August 16, 1926, from Cresson to Cleburne, with a possible extension to Grandview (numbered as SH 122 on June 21, 1927, from Cresson to Cleburne only; number possibly reserved earlier). On March 18, 1930, SH 122 extended to Weatherford. On July 15, 1935, the north end was truncated back to Cresson. On October 23, 1935, SH 122 extended back to Weatherford. That route was replaced by SH 171 on September 26, 1939. On March 29, 1988, the second route was designated on the Fort Bend Parkway—stretching from Beltway 8 to the Grand Parkway (SH 99). Environmental and feasibility studies were conducted during the next 10 years. On February 27, 2003, the SH 122 designation was removed from the section north of State Highway 6, as this section was under construction, but not using state funding. On February 26, 2015, the remainder of SH 122 was removed from the state highway system as most of the route south of SH 6 had been built not using state funding.

== SH 126 ==
State Highway 126 was designated on November 15, 1927, as a connector route between Knox City and Munday. On March 19, 1930, the route was removed from the state highway list, but was still designated. On August 27, 1935, the route, which was not on the state highway list, was upgraded to a state highway and renumbered to SH 222.

== SH 129 ==
State Highway 129 was designated on January 16, 1928, as a connector route between Brownwood and Rising Star. It was co-located with US 283 in 1934. The co-designation was removed on July 23, 1934, and the route was transferred to SH 23 when it was rerouted further east.

== SH 133 ==
State Highway 133 was designated on April 25, 1928, between Moss Hill and Beaumont. The route was still not built by 1933, and was removed as a state highway on July 12, 1933, and reassigned as an eastward extension of SH 105. This section of SH 105 was cancelled on July 15, 1935, as the road was not built. This road was restored as part of SH 105 again on February 11, 1937.

== SH 134 ==
State Highway 134 has been designated twice. The first route was designated on May 25, 1928 as a new highway from Lubbock west to the New Mexico border. This route became the western extension of SH 24 on March 19, 1930.

The route was instead designated as the connector route from the Houston-La Porte Road (now SH 225) to the San Jacinto Battleground State Historic Site outside Houston that same day (originally designated on March 19, 1928, as SH 4-21-36). SH 134 was not connected to any other state highway until SH 225 was designated on December 21, 1935. SH 134 was returned to local jurisdiction on December 14, 2006.

== SH 139 ==
State Highway 139 has been designated twice. The first route was designated on April 23, 1929, from Corsicana to Palestine. On March 19, 1930, this became part of SH 22 (now US 287) when it was extended.

SH 139 was instead proposed that same day as a connector route between Chilton and Marlin (previously unnumbered; originally designated on August 9, 1926). On September 7, 1943, the route was extended east to the town of Marquez. The route became the western extension of SH 7 on July 15, 1948.

== SH 143 ==
State Highway 143 was proposed on November 26, 1929, as a spur from SH 5 to Channing. On November 30, 1932, SH 143 was extended south to Dimmitt, and SH 5 was rerouted through Channing. On February 9, 1933, SH 143 was extended south to Meadow. On July 16, 1934, the entire route was transferred to SH 51 (now US 385).

== SH 145 ==
State Highway 145 has been designated twice. The first SH 145 was designated on March 19, 1930, from Three Rivers to Alice, replacing a split of SH 9 so that SH 9 had only one route south of Three Rivers. On June 24, 1931, the entire route became part of SH 66 (now US 281). On July 15, 1932, a new SH 145 was proposed as a spur from SH 24 south to the town of Princeton. The route was redesignated as Spur 73 on September 26, 1939. The route became part of FM 75 on April 15, 1943, but this section was given to the city of Princeton on February 28, 2019.

== SH 157 ==
State Highway 157 was designated on March 19, 1930, as a more direct route between Breckenridge and Throckmorton. It was a renumbering of SH 67A. The route became the northern extension of SH 6 on September 6, 1945.

== SH 162 ==
State Highway 162 was designated on March 19, 1930, as a spur from SH 12 (now US 59) south to the Fannin Battleground State Historic Site as a renumbering of part of SH 12, which was rerouted to bypass the Fannin Battleground State Historic Site. The route was redesignated as Spur 91 (now PR 27) on May 9, 1940.

== SH 169 ==
State Highway 169 was designated on August 3, 1932, from Decatur to Gainesville. This became part of SH 89 on November 30, 1932. It was later reused as a proposed freeway in Austin from Loop 1 to I-35 on October 27, 1989, with local support as exhibited by the passage of a referendum election; and the City of Austin's support of a west/east facility in this corridor. The route was formerly Spur 69 and part of RM 2222, and was returned to the previous designations on July 19, 1990, as the agreement was not met.

== SH 177 ==
State Highway 177 was designated on September 22, 1932, as a spur between La Ward and SH 58 (now SH 35) east of Blessing. In late 1933, the section west of Blessing was cancelled, as SH 111 was rerouted on a road just to the north. On January 9, 1934, SH 177 was cancelled in lieu of designating SH 111 from Edna to Midfield. On August 27, 1935, the portion of SH 177 from SH 35 to Blessing was restored. The route was redesignated as Spur 93 (later FM 1727, now FM 616) on May 9, 1940.

== SH 181 ==
State Highway 181 was designated on November 30, 1932, as a spur from Gary City east to US 59. This road was SH 8A before March 19, 1930, and this highway was erroneously omitted from the March 19, 1930 state highway log. The route became the eastern extension of FM 999 on June 29, 1950.

== SH 187 ==
State Highway 187 was proposed on November 30, 1932, as a connector between Cisco and SH 67 to the northeast. The route became a portion of US 183 when it was rerouted on May 28, 1952.

== SH 189 ==
State Highway 189 was proposed on November 30, 1932, as a connector between Catarina and Artesia Wells. The route was never completed, and was removed on July 15, 1935. The route became a portion of FM 133 in 1945.

== SH 192 ==
State Highway 192 was designated on November 30, 1932, as a connector between Pecos and Fort Stockton. The route became a portion of SH 27 on June 20, 1933, when it was rerouted northwest from Fort Stockton.

== SH 196 ==
State Highway 196 was designated on June 20, 1933, as a connector between US 80 in far western Reeves County and Fort Stockton. The route was formerly a portion of SH 27 before it was rerouted northwest from Fort Stockton, replacing SH 192. The route was codesignated with US 290, and the codesignation was removed on September 26, 1939.

== SH 197 ==
State Highway 197 was designated on August 16, 1933, as a more direct route between Waxahachie and downtown Dallas. The designation was cancelled on November 24, 1941, and replaced by a rerouted US 77. The old route of US 77 was renumbered to SH 342.

== SH 200 ==
State Highway 200 has been designated twice. The first designation was on November 22, 1933, from Gonzales east through Hallettsville to Eagle Lake as a renumbering of a portion of SH 111. On July 15, 1935, SH 200 was cancelled (as it was not built yet). On October 20, 1936, SH 200 was restored. On September 16, 1937, the section from Hallettsville to Eagle Lake was renumbered as SH 253, and SH 200 was instead rerouted southeast to Wharton. On September 26, 1939, SH 200 extended southwest to SH 80 in Nixon, replacing SH 112. In 1940, the section from Gonzales to Hallettsville was minimally maintained, and the section east of Hallettsville remained unbuilt. On May 29, 1941, the route east of Hallettsville was rerouted back to Eagle Lake, replacing SH 253 (the route to Wharton was never built). This entire route was cancelled on March 28, 1952: the section from Gonzales to Eagle Lake was transferred to US 90A and the section from SH 80 to Gonzales became an extension of SH 97. The second route was designated on February 24, 1988, from Ingleside south to the Corpus Christi Homeport. The route remains unbuilt.

== SH 209 ==
State Highway 209 was designated on July 16, 1934, as a connector between Pampa and Borger in the Texas Panhandle. The route became the western extension of SH 152 on June 21, 1938.

== SH 212 ==
State Highway 212 was designated on July 31, 1934, as a connector between Cayuga and Fairfield. On September 11, 1934, it was extended to Athens. On July 15, 1935, this route was cancelled (as it was never built). The northern half of this route became FM 59 in 1942 and the remainder became part of FM 488 in 1945.

== SH 215 ==
State Highway 215 was designated on January 18, 1935 as a connector between Carthage and Mount Enterprise. On July 15, 1935, this route was cancelled (as it was not built yet). This route was restored on December 22, 1936. On April 28, 1937, this route was cancelled because a feeder road upgrading the existing road between the endpoints was under planning. The feeder road was redesignated as SH 315 on April 1, 1939.

== SH 216 ==
State Highway 216 was designated on January 18, 1935 as a connector between Midland and SH 51 (designation accidentally said SH 137) in Andrews County. On February 26, 1935, it was adjusted to end in Ector County. On July 15, 1935, this route was cancelled (as it was not built yet). On September 4, 1935, this route was submitted as a lateral road project for possible restoration. The section from SH 51 east to the county line was restored on September 22, 1936. On November 24, 1936, an extension to Kermit was proposed. On February 11, 1937, this route was cancelled, and became an extension of SH 158.

== SH 219 ==
State Highway 219 was designated on June 11, 1935 as a connector between US 190 in Huntsville and the gravesite of Sam Houston on the north side of Huntsville. The route was redesignated as Spur 94 on May 9, 1940.

== SH 221 ==
State Highway 221 was designated on August 27, 1935, as a loop connector for SH 36, giving access to Heidenheimer, replacing State Highway 36A. The route was removed on January 6, 1939, as a more direct route for SH 36 from Temple to Rogers through Heidenheimer (rather than Little River) was completed. The former SH 221 is now mostly FM 93 and FM 436 from "Old 95" (which was actually part of SH 95 in the 1930s) north of Little River to Reed's Lake Road east of Little River.

== SH 226 ==
State Highway 226 was designated on February 18, 1936, as a connector from then-SH 112 (now SH 97) to the location of the monument on the Guadalupe River commemorating the firing of the first shot in the Texas-Mexican Revolution. The route was redesignated as Spur 95 on May 9, 1940.

== SH 227 ==
State Highway 227 has been designated twice. The first route was designated on March 17, 1936, as a route from Marathon south into the Big Bend National Park, with a spur to Terlingua. On October 30, 1939, the spur to Terlingua became part of SH 118. The remoteness of the route made construction improvement difficult and slow. On February 20, 1946, the section of SH 227 in Big Bend National Park was cancelled, as Big Bend State Park became a National Park. The route became the southern extension of SH 51 on October 24, 1956, for preparation of a proposed U.S. Route. The U.S. Route was accepted as US 385 on August 28, 1958, cancelling SH 51. The second route was designated on September 26, 1986, as the former routing of SH 288 from FM 521 south Angleton south to SH 332 and SH 288 in Clute. On February 23, 1989, SH 227 extended south to SH 36 over old SH 288. On August 15, 1989, the section from SH 36 northward 4 miles was transferred back to SH 288. This route was redesignated as Business SH 288-B on October 25, 1990.

== SH 228 ==
State Highway 228 was designated on April 20, 1936, as a route from Houston to Port Arthur. On September 26, 1939, this route was cancelled and transferred to SH 73.

== SH 229 ==
State Highway 229 was designated on May 19, 1936, as a route from SH 90 to Washington-on-the-Brazos. On September 26, 1939, this route was transferred to PR 12.

== SH 230 ==
State Highway 230 has been designated twice. The first route was designated on May 19, 1936, as a route from near Bryan (now in College Station city limits) southwest to Somerville. On January 24, 1939, SH 230 was extended east from old SH 6 to new SH 6. This route was transferred to FM 50 and FM 60 (now FM 50) on May 20, 1942. The second route was designated on June 21, 1990, as a bypass route around the western and southern side of Midlothian. The routing was proposed as the main routing of US 287 on May 29, 2003. The old route was to become a business route. The SH 230 designation was never rescinded.

== SH 231 ==
State Highway 231 was designated on June 16, 1936, as a connector route between Southmayd and Dorchester. The designation was cancelled on March 6, 1941. The section from SH 289 to Dorchester was restored as FM 902 on November 23, 1948.

== SH 232 ==
State Highway 232 was designated on August 1, 1936, as a connecting route between Blanco and SH 80 south of Wimberley. Construction of the portions of the route in Blanco and Hays Counties were completed by 1940, but improved routing through Comal County was slow to complete. On April 29, 1942, the route was transferred to RM 32.

== SH 233 ==
State Highway 233 was designated on August 1, 1936, as a connecting route between SH 1/US 80 in Kent and SH 166 near Fort Davis. On September 26, 1939, this route was cancelled, and this route became an extension of SH 118.

== SH 235 ==
State Highway 235 was designated on September 22, 1936, as a connecting route from Vidor northeast to the Deweyville bridge crossing the Sabine River and continuing into Louisiana. The route was renumbered SH 12 on August 27, 1959, to correspond to the connecting Louisiana Highway 12.

== SH 241 ==
State Highway 241 was designated on November 24, 1936, as a route southward from Jourdanton, ending at Freer, with the possible extension further south to Hebbronville. On December 22, 1937, the highway was extended south to Rio Grande City, but this was reverted by April 1, 1938. On September 26, 1939, the route became the southern extension of SH 173 (now SH 16).

== SH 244 ==
State Highway 244 was designated on February 25, 1937, as a connecting route between SH 6 (now US 290/SH 6) and Prairie View College. The route was redesignated as Spur 96 (now FM 1098) on May 9, 1940.

== SH 245 ==
State Highway 245 was designated on April 19, 1937, as a connecting route between SH 77 and Marietta. The route was redesignated as Spur 97 (now FM 250) on May 9, 1940.

== SH 246 ==
State Highway 246 was designated on June 23, 1937, as a connecting route between US 75 and US 77 (now SH 342) south of Dallas. The route was removed from the state highway system on August 22, 1951, due to completion of Loop 12, though signage was not removed until January 1, 1952. It is now East Illinois Avenue from Lancaster Road to IH 45 in Dallas.

== SH 247 ==
State Highway 247 was designated on June 23, 1937, as a connecting route between SH 154 and SH 24. On August 4, 1937, this became part of SH 154, and it was reassigned to the old route of SH 154 from Ladonia to Cooper. Part of the route was built west from Cooper by 1940. The completed portion of the route was redesignated as FM 64 on June 23, 1942.

== SH 248 ==
State Highway 248 was designated on June 22, 1937, as a connecting route between SH 81 (now SH 16) at Kerrville and the local state mental hospital. The route was transferred to Spur 98 (now Loop 98) on May 9, 1940.

== SH 250 ==
State Highway 250 was designated on June 22, 1937, as a connecting route between Mission and Edinburg. The route became the western extension of SH 107 on September 26, 1939.

== SH 252 ==
State Highway 252 was designated on August 3, 1937, as a connecting route from Munday north to US 82. This route became the northern extension of SH 222 (now FM 267) on September 26, 1939.

== SH 253 ==
State Highway 253 was designated on September 16, 1937, as a connecting route between Hallettsville and Eagle Lake as a renumbering of part of SH 200, which was rerouted southeast to Wharton. On May 29, 1941, SH 200 (now US 90A) was routed back over SH 253 because the route to Wharton was never built.

== SH 257 ==
State Highway 257 was designated on November 5, 1937, as a route from Laredo northeast to George West. On September 26, 1939, SH 257 was to extend to Refugio. The route became an expansion and redirection of SH 202 on October 30, 1939, before signage on SH 202 was changed.

== SH 259 ==
State Highway 259 was designated on April 19, 1938, as a route across western Rusk County north to the Gregg/Rusk County Line. It extended to Kilgore on September 20, 1938. It was extended to Gladewater on July 25, 1939. The route was transferred to SH 42 on December 12, 1962, to avoid confusion with US 259, which also ran through Kilgore.

== SH 260 ==
State Highway 260 was designated on February 21, 1938, from Commerce to Naples. The route was cancelled when it was built. On September 26, 1939, this became the western extension of SH 77, and this section was cancelled on January 14, 1941. It became FM 71 in 1942.

== SH 262 ==
State Highway 262 was designated on April 19, 1938, as a route from Big Spring west to Andrews. On August 1, 1938, it was rerouted to go south to Stanton. On December 21, 1938, the west end was shortened to 8 miles east of Andrews. The route was cancelled when the counties got ROW deeds on April 25, 1939. It became RM 87 (now SH 176) in 1942.

== SH 263 ==
State Highway 263 was designated on April 19, 1938, from Bonham to Randolph. The route was cancelled on March 21, 1939. The route was restored on September 6, 1943, as FM 82 (now SH 121).

== SH 264 ==
State Highway 264 was designated on May 24, 1938, as a connector route from SH 27 near Fredericksburg to the American Legion Cemetery. This route was redesignated as Spur 100 on May 9, 1940.

== SH 265 ==
State Highway 265 has been designated twice. The first route was designated on May 24, 1938, as a connector route from Normangee to the Normangee State Park. This route was cancelled on March 26, 1942, in exchange for creation of FM 3. The route was again designated on July 29, 1987, as a proposed freeway, called the "GAP (Galveston-Alvin-Pearland) Freeway" or the "West Bay Freeway", from Beltway 8 on the south side of Houston southward through Alvin to Jamaica Beach on Galveston Island. This route was never built, and was cancelled on July 28, 1994. GAP Transportation Corporation was unable to fulfill the project requirements and disbanded in April 1989. Existing SH 35 was developed instead.

== SH 266 ==
State Highway 266 was designated on May 24, 1938, from Nacogdoches to Ratcliff. This became part of SH 7 on September 26, 1939.

== SH 267 ==
State Highway 267 was designated on May 24, 1938, as a route in rural Real County from SH 41 8 miles west of the Real/Kerr County Line to US 83 north of Leakey. This route was cancelled on August 20, 1940. The route was later redesignated as RM 336 in 1945. The SH 267 designation was assigned in 2012 as a proposed relief route around Dublin in Erath County previously considered as a rerouting of on March 29, 2012. The numbering was transferred back to US 67 in 2013.

== SH 268 ==
State Highway 268 was designated on May 24, 1938, as a route from San Angelo east to Paint Rock. The route was cancelled on August 31, 1939, when the counties got ROW deeds. It became RM 380 in 1945.

== SH 269 ==
State Highway 269 was designated on June 21, 1938, as a connector route from Troup to Wright City. The route was redesignated as FM 15 on March 26, 1942.

== SH 270 ==
State Highway 270 was designated on June 21, 1938, as a connector route from Tyler north to the Tyler State Park near Sandflat. The route was redesignated as FM 14 on March 26, 1942.

== SH 271 ==
State Highway 271 was designated on June 21, 1938, as a connector route from Rankin to Sheffield. The route was redesignated as SH 137 on September 26, 1939, when it was extended south.

== SH 272 ==
State Highway 272 was designated on June 21, 1938, as a connector route from Neches north to Todd City. This route was cancelled upon the completion of the WPA project (which happened some time after September 26, 1939). The route was restored as FM 19 on April 29, 1942.

== SH 277 ==
State Highway 277 was designated on September 20, 1938, as a connector route along the very southern edge of Kilgore. This route was redesignated to Spur 101 (now SH 42) on May 9, 1940.

== SH 278 ==
State Highway 278 was designated on September 20, 1938, as a route from Floydada West through Littlefield to SH 214 south of Muleshoe, near Enochs. On August 27, 1940, the section from US 87 west to the Hale/Lamb County Line was cancelled. On October 22, 1940, the sections from SH 214 to the Lamb/Bailey County Line and from the Hale/Lamb County Line to Littlefield were cancelled. On November 22, 1940, the remainder of the route was cancelled. The route was resurrected as FM 54 starting on May 20, 1942.

== SH 280 ==
State Highway 280 was designated on October 25, 1938, from Plainview southeast through Petersburg, then southwest through Slaton to Tahoka. This became part of SH 194 on September 26, 1939, but this section ended up never being built.

== SH 281 ==
State Highway 281 was proposed to be designated on September 26, 1939, from Jacksboro southeast into Fort Worth, replacing a portion of SH 34 (it would go from Oklahoma to Dumas if US 287 was not accepted). The road was actually designated as SH 319 (because it crossed US 281), and became a portion of SH 199 two months later.

== SH 282 ==
State Highway 282 has been designated twice. The first route was designated on September 26, 1939, as a connector route from Spearman north to the Oklahoma State line as a renumbering of part of SH 18, continuing to Guymon, Oklahoma. This route was transferred completely to SH 15 and SH 207 on September 1, 1965. The route was again designated on September 28, 1993, as a route from US 77 on the south side of Kingsville east to the entrance to Kingsville Naval Air Station via Caesar Avenue. This route was completed in 1996, and was cancelled per agreement at that time and ownership returned to the city of Kingsville.

== SH 284 ==
State Highway 284 was designated on September 26, 1939, as a connector route from Goldthwaite southeast to Lometa as a renumbering of SH 74A. This route became a portion of US 183 when it was extended south on May 23, 1951.

== SH 287 ==
State Highway 287 was proposed to be designated on September 26, 1939, to replace the section of SH 9 from US 87 in San Antonio to US 281. The road was actually designated as an extension of SH 16.

== SH 291 ==
State Highway 291 was designated on September 26, 1939, as a connector route from SH 171 to US 81 near Itasca and a renumbering of one part of SH 2A. On October 31, 1958, the extension of FM 67 from Covington to US 81 & FM 712 was designated 4 miles north of SH 291, and FM 712 was cancelled and combined with FM 67. FM 712 was reassigned to a road in Falls County on December 19, 1959. When construction was completed, SH 291 would be cancelled. On November 2, 1962, SH 291 was redesignated as FM 2719, due to the completion of the FM 67 extension.

== SH 292 ==
State Highway 292 was designated on September 26, 1939, as a connector route from US 67 north to Keene as a renumbering of SH 68 Spur. This route was redesignated as State Spur 102 on May 9, 1940.

== SH 293 ==
State Highway 293 was designated on September 26, 1939, as a route from Ratcliff via Lufkin to near Milam. This route was found to be a duplicate of the eastern extension of SH 103, and was thus renumbered to reflect this on October 30, 1939.

== SH 295 ==
State Highway 295 was designated on September 26, 1939, as a more direct route from Victoria north to Hallettsville, replacing part of SH 44. This route became the main routing for US 77 on September 23, 1953, with the previous routing of US 77 from Victoria through Goliad to Hallettsville becoming Alt. US 77.

== SH 296 ==
State Highway 296 was a proposed replacement of the disconnected section of SH 45 from Jasper to the Louisiana border that was never implemented, as SH 63 (which was to be cancelled in the early draft of renumbering due to US 287 Alternate replacing the remainder) was instead rerouted over this road.

== SH 297 ==
State Highway 297 has been designated twice. The first route was designated on September 25, 1939, as a route from Schulenburg south via Shiner to Yoakum as a renumbering of part of SH 95. This route became the southward extension of SH 95 on November 20, 1939. The route was designated a second time on January 30, 1989, as a new route from Mendoza, just south of Austin, southwestward to Seguin, roughly parallel to I-35. It was to be part of the improved traffic flow around the city of Austin. This route was renumbered as a southward extension of SH 130 on December 8, 1993.

== SH 298 ==
State Highway 298 was a proposed designation from SH 87 to the Sabine River that was never implemented, as it was designated as Spur 69 instead. On October 27, 1945, it was redesignated as part of SH 235 (now SH 12).

== SH 299 ==
State Highway 299 was designated on January 23, 1939, as a linking route between US 59 and US 69 on the far south side of Lufkin. This route was cancelled and replaced by FM 58 on May 19, 1942.

== SH 301 ==
State Highway 301 was designated on January 23, 1939, as a linking route between Ranger and Desdemona. This route was cancelled when it was built.

== SH 303 ==
State Highway 303 was designated on December 1, 1938, as a route from Lamesa to the Martin County Line. The number was not assigned until January 23, 1939. On October 22, 1940, it was extended south to Stanton. This route became the southern extension of SH 137 on August 23, 1943.

== SH 306 ==
State Highway 306 was designated on December 21, 1938, as a route between Italy and Ennis. The number was not assigned until January 23, 1939. This route became the western extension of SH 34 on September 26, 1939.

== SH 307 ==
State Highway 307 was designated on January 24, 1939, as a transit route along the southern edge of Texas A&M University. The route ran along what is now George Bush Drive from Wellborn Road to Texas Avenue (SH 6-B). This route, along with the part of SH 308 south of FM 60, was cancelled on January 31, 1961. This was redesignated as FM 2347 on January 31, 1967.

== SH 311 ==
State Highway 311 was designated on February 20, 1939, as a route between Luling and Red Rock. This route was renamed FM 86 on August 24, 1943.

== SH 313 ==
State Highway 313 was designated on March 21, 1939, as a route from Huntsville northwest to the Huntsville/Midway Road. This route was cancelled on February 4, 1941.

== SH 314 ==
State Highway 314 was designated on April 1, 1939, as a connector route between Bailey and Commerce via Wolfe City. The section from Wolfe City to Commerce was cancelled on March 27, 1940. The remainder of the highway was cancelled on December 3, 1940. This route was partially restored on June 25, 1945, as FM 512 from Commerce to Aberfoyle. On September 9, 1947, another part of SH 314 was restored as FM 816 from Wolfe City to FM 272 in Hickory Creek. On October 25, 1949, another part of SH 314 was restored as FM 1551 from Bailey south to the Fannin/Hunt County Line. On November 30, 1949, FM 816 extended north from Hickory Creek to FM 1551 at the Fannin/Hunt county line, and FM 1551 became part of FM 816, restoring more of SH 314. That same day, FM 512 extended to Wolfe City, restoring the remainder of SH 314. As a result, SH 314 was entirely restored. SH 314 was bypassed by FM 2320, designated on August 24, 1955, from Commerce to Wolfe City. On November 21, 1956, FM 2320 extended west to Bailey. On October 31, 1958, FM 2320 became part of FM 1281, and FM 1281 became part of SH 11 on December 17, 1970.

== SH 318 ==
State Highway 318 was designated on September 1, 1939, as a route between Seagraves and Denver City. This route was cancelled on December 18, 1939., but was restored as a portion of SH 328 in 1940.

== SH 319 ==
State Highway 319 was designated on September 26, 1939, as a route from Jacksboro southeast into Fort Worth, replacing a portion of SH 34. Note that this was to be SH 281 in the initial renumbering plans. This route became the eastern extension of SH 199 on October 30, 1939. The present-day routing of SH 199 was the original routing of SH 319.

== SH 324 ==
State Highway 324 was designated on October 30, 1939, as a route between Henderson and Carlisle (now Price). This route was replaced by FM 13 on March 26, 1942.

== SH 325 ==
State Highway 325 was designated on December 7, 1939, as a route between Itasca and Files Valley. This route was cancelled on February 20, 1940. This route was replaced by FM 66 on June 23, 1942.

== SH 328 ==
State Highway 328 was designated on February 13, 1940, as a route between Seagraves and O'Donnell. The route was extended west to Denver City on May 20, 1940. On October 24, 1941, the section of the route from the Gaines/Dawson County Line to O'Donnell was cancelled. On January 9, 1945, the route extended east to SH 137. On September 26, 1945, SH 328 extended west to the Texas/New Mexico state line. This route was renumbered SH 83 on March 31, 1955 "for the convenience of the traveling public", as it corresponded to NM 83 (now NM 132) to which it connected at the state line.

== SH 330 ==
State Highway 330 was designated on May 9, 1940, as a bridge route across the Intracoastal Waterway southeast of Sargent. This route was transferred to FM 457 on December 17, 1952.

== SH 331 ==
State Highway 331 was designated on July 20, 1940, as a connector route from Corpus Christi to Corpus Christi Naval Air Station. The route was never built and was cancelled on October 1, 1940.

== SH 333 ==
State Highway 333 was designated on September 25, 1939, initially as a bridge route across the Intracoastal Waterway at Freeport. This route was cancelled, along with SH 334, on August 27, 1959, due to the completion of FM 1495.

== SH 335 ==
State Highway 335 was designated on September 25, 1939, as a bridge route across the Intracoastal Waterway between Brazoria and Freeport. This route was cancelled on November 25, 1975, as the location of SH 335 had not been established on the ground, no right of way had been purchased, and no action had been taken to place this number in active use. This bridge was never built. If a future bridge was proposed, it would be designated as an extension of FM 2918.

== SH 340 ==
State Highway 340 was designated on August 1, 1941, as a connecting route from US 96 north of Kirbyville east to near Bleakwood. This route became the western extension of FM 363 on September 26, 1945.

== SH 341 ==
State Highway 341 was designated on September 15, 1941, as a connecting route in Texas City. This route became the eastern extension of FM 519 on November 29, 1990.

== SH 343 ==
State Highway 343 was designated on November 24, 1941, from near Columbus to Rosenberg as a replacement of US 90 when it was rerouted on a more northern routing. This route was replaced by US 90A on June 23, 1942.

== SH 344 ==
State Highway 344 was designated on May 5, 1940, initially as a bridge route across the Intracoastal Waterway at Matagorda. This route was replaced by FM 2031 on December 17, 1952.

== SH 346 ==
State Highway 346 was designated on April 29, 1942, as a connecting route from Jourdanton to Poteet as a replacement for a proposed road from Jourdanton to San Antonio, which was designated on May 21, 1940. The route was extended north to San Antonio on August 22, 1945. On October 30, 1964, the section from I-35 to Loop 353 was given to the city of San Antonio. This route became part of the southern extension of SH 16 on August 31, 1965.

== SH 348 ==
State Highway 348 was designated on June 10, 1943, as a connector route between Texas City and La Marque. This route became the eastern extension of FM 1765 on November 29, 1990.

== SH 353 ==
State Highway 353 was designated on December 3, 1940, as a route between Cleburne and Meridian. When this was complete, all of SH 353 except for the Brazos River bridge would be cancelled. On June 11, 1945, FM 167 was designated from Cleburne to the Hill County Line, and from Morgan to Meridian. On August 23, 1945, FM 167 extended from Morgan to the Hill County Line, and SH 353 was cancelled. The route was reassigned back to SH 353 on September 27, 1946. On June 29, 1950, the Brazos River was completed on SH 353, and when adequate facilities for highway travel were built on SH 353, SH 353 was to become part of SH 174, and the old route of SH 174 from Cleburne to Iredell was to be cancelled. This route became the majority of SH 174 on August 20, 1952 as adequate facilities for highway travel were built on SH 353.

== SH 355 ==
State Highway 355 was designated on February 21, 1946, along a former portion of FM 118 as a connector route between US 67 and then-SH 24 east of Greenville. This route became the southern extension of FM 118 on July 1, 1947.

== SH 362 ==
State Highway 362 has been designated twice. The route was first designated on September 19, 1956, as a route from Port Arthur to Sabine Pass. This route was the construction of the main levee south of the city. This route was cancelled on December 13, 1956, in exchange for being redesignated as FM 1900. The entire designation was returned to the city on October 30, 1958, when it was completed. This road was restored on January 29, 1975, at SH 82, which extended to the Louisiana border. The second route was designated on November 27, 1985, as a route from US 90A to US 59 in Fort Bend County. This route was redesignated as SH 312 on June 17, 1987, to avoid confusion with nearby FM 362.

== SH 363 ==
State Highway 363 was designated on February 24, 1988, from SH 200 at Ingleside to SH 361. On October 13, 1988, SH 363 was extended to SH 35 at Aransas Pass, replacing SH 365. This route was never constructed, but the designation has not been cancelled.

== SH 824 ==
State Highway 824 was designated on June 4, 1964, as a new connector route between Jacksboro and Vineyard, replacing portions of FM 1156, along with portions of RM 2475 that were being constructed as an alternate routing of SH 24 south of Lake Bridgeport. On October 1, 1968, this route was transferred to the main route of SH 24 (now US 380), while the old routing of SH 24 was transferred to FM 1810. This section of SH 24 became part of US 380 on August 4, 1971.
