= 1939 general re-description of highway system (Texas) =

This article is part of the highway renumbering series.
Alabama	1928, 1957
Arkansas	1926
California	1964
Colorado	1953, 1968
Connecticut	1932, 1963
Florida	1945
Indiana	1926
Iowa	1926, 1969
Louisiana	1955
Maine	1933
Massachusetts	1933
Minnesota	1934
Missouri	1926
Montana	1932
Nebraska	1926
Nevada	1976
New Jersey	1927, 1953
New Mexico	1926, 1988
New York	1927, 1930
North Carolina	1934, 1937, 1940, 1961
North Dakota	1926
Ohio	1923, 1927, 1962
Pennsylvania	1928, 1961
Puerto Rico	1953
South Carolina	1928, 1937
South Dakota	1927, 1975
Tennessee	1983
Texas	1939, 1990
Utah	1962, 1977
Virginia	1923, 1928, 1933, 1940, 1958
Washington	1964
Wisconsin	1926
Wyoming	1927

In 1939, the Texas Highway Department renumbered all highways that ran concurrently with U.S. Highways. Sections of state highways that were separated by a concurrency with a US Highway were renumbered, and all suffixed routes (that did not become part of other highways or other state highways) were renumbered.

New	Old	From	To	Notes
U.S. Highway 54	State Highway 56	Oklahoma	New Mexico	
U.S. Highway 54	State Highway 33	New Mexico	El Paso	
U.S. Highway 59	State Highway 8	Maud	Tenaha	
U.S. Highway 59	State Highway 35	Timpson	Houston	
U.S. Highway 59	State Highway 12	Rosenberg	Laredo	
U.S. Highway 60	State Highway 33	Oklahoma	New Mexico	
U.S. Highway 62	State Highway 138	Oklahoma	North of Childress	
U.S. Highway 62	State Highway 18	Matador	Dickens	
U.S. Highway 62	State Highway 137	Lubbock	Brownfield	
U.S. Highway 62	State Highway 130	New Mexico	El Paso	
U.S. Highway 66	State Highway 75	Oklahoma	Amarillo	
U.S. Highway 66	State Highway 13	Amarillo	New Mexico	
U.S. Highway 67	State Highway 1	Texarkana	Dallas	
U.S. Highway 67	State Highway 68	Dallas	Stephenville	
U.S. Highway 67	State Highway 10	Stephenville	Alpine	
U.S. Highway 67	State Highway 17	Marfa	Presidio	
U.S. Highway 69	State Highway 160	Denison	Whitewright	
U.S. Highway 69	State Highway 42	Whitewright	Mineola	
U.S. Highway 69	State Highway 37	Mineola	Jacksonville	
U.S. Highway 69	State Highway 40	Jacksonville	Lumberton	
U.S. Highway 70	State Highway 28	Vernon	Muleshoe	
U.S. Highway 71	State Highway 47	Arkansas	Texarkana	
U.S. Highway 75	State Highway 6	Oklahoma	Dallas	
U.S. Highway 75	State Highway 14	Dallas	Richland	
U.S. Highway 75	State Highway 32	Richland	Huntsville	
U.S. Highway 75	State Highway 19	Huntsville	Houston	
U.S. Highway 75	State Highway 6	Houston	Galveston	
U.S. Highway 77	State Highway 40	Oklahoma	Dallas	
U.S. Highway 77	State Highway 6	Dallas	Waco	
U.S. Highway 77	State Highway 44	Waco	Hallettsville	
U.S. Highway 77	State Highway 72	Hallettsville	Cuero	
U.S. Highway 77	State Highway 44	Victoria	Sinton	
U.S. Highway 79	State Highway 64	Louisiana	Henderson	
U.S. Highway 79	State Highway 43	Henderson	Round Rock	
U.S. Highway 80	State Highway 15	Louisiana	Dallas	
U.S. Highway 80	State Highway 1B	Dallas	Cockrell Hill	
U.S. Highway 80	State Highway 1	Cockrell Hill	New Mexico (US 80/SH 1 went via what is now US 180 and SH 16 until 1938)	
U.S. Highway 80 Alternate	State Highway 15	Weatherford	West of Albany	
U.S. Highway 80 Alternate	State Highway 1A	West of Albany	Abilene	
U.S. Highway 80 Alternate	State Highway 1 (Loop)	El Paso	South of Canutillo	
U.S. Highway 81	State Highway 2	Oklahoma	Laredo	
U.S. Highway 81 Alternate	State Highway 2 (Loop)	South of Fort Worth	Fort Worth	
U.S. Highway 82	State Highway 5	Texarkana	Wichita Falls	
U.S. Highway 82	State Highway 24	Seymour	Lubbock	
U.S. Highway 83	State Highway 4	Oklahoma	Brownsville	
U.S. Highway 84	State Highway 35	Louisiana	Timpson	
U.S. Highway 84	State Highway 22	Timpson	Palestine	
U.S. Highway 84	State Highway 7	Northeast of Oakwood	New Mexico	
U.S. Highway 87	State Highway 5	New Mexico	Hartley	
U.S. Highway 87	State Highway 152	Hartley	Dumas	
U.S. Highway 87	State Highway 9	Dumas	San Antonio	
U.S. Highway 87	State Highway 27	San Antonio	Port Lavaca	
U.S. Highway 90	State Highway 3	Louisiana	Waelder	
U.S. Highway 90	State Highway 3A	Waelder	Seguin	
U.S. Highway 90	State Highway 3	Seguin	Van Horn	
U.S. Highway 90	State Highway 54	Van Horn	South of El Capitan	US 90 was proposed to overlap with US 62 to El Paso. Changed back to 54 5 months later.
U.S. Highway 96	State Highway 8	Tenaha	Port Arthur	
U.S. Highway 175	State Highway 40	Dallas	Jacksonville	Originally planned as part of US 287 Alternate
U.S. Highway 181	State Highway 16	San Antonio	Corpus Christi	
U.S. Highway 183	State Highway 28	Oklahoma	Vernon	
U.S. Highway 183	State Highway 191	Albany	Coleman	
U.S. Highway 183	State Highway 16	Santa Anna	Brady	
U.S. Highway 190	State Highway 63	Louisiana	Jasper	
U.S. Highway 190	State Highway 45	Jasper	Huntsville	
U.S. Highway 190	State Highway 69	Hearne	Cameron	
U.S. Highway 190	State Highway 53	Belton	Lampasas	
U.S. Highway 190	State Highway 74	Lampasas	Brady	
U.S. Highway 271	State Highway 24	Oklahoma	Paris	
U.S. Highway 271	State Highway 49	Paris	Mount Pleasant	
U.S. Highway 271	State Highway 65	Mount Pleasant	Gladewater	
U.S. Highway 271	State Highway 31	Gladewater	Tyler	
U.S. Highway 277	State Highway 30	Oklahoma	Mexico	
U.S. Highway 281	State Highway 66	Wichita Falls	Hidalgo	66 continued northeast from Wichita Falls with 79
U.S. Highway 281	State Highway 48	Hidalgo	Brownsville	
U.S. Highway 283	State Highway 23	Oklahoma	Brady	
U.S. Highway 285	State Highway 27	New Mexico	Fort Stockton	
U.S. Highway 285	State Highway 82	Fort Stockton	Sanderson	
U.S. Highway 287	State Highway 9	Oklahoma	Dumas	
U.S. Highway 287	State Highway 5	Amarillo	Henrietta	This was part of US 370 before the renumbering.
U.S. Highway 287	State Highway 50	Henrietta	Bowie	This was part of US 370 before the renumbering.
U.S. Highway 287	State Highway 34	Fort Worth	Ennis	
U.S. Highway 287	State Highway 22	Corsicana	Palestine	
U.S. Highway 287	State Highway 19	Palestine	Crockett	
U.S. Highway 287	State Highway 106	Crockett	Woodville	
U.S. Highway 290	State Highway 6	Houston	Hempstead	
U.S. Highway 290	State Highway 20	Hempstead	Paige	
U.S. Highway 290	State Highway OSR	Paige	Bastrop	
U.S. Highway 290	State Highway 71	Bastrop	Austin	
U.S. Highway 290	State Highway 20	Austin	Southeast of Junction	
U.S. Highway 290	State Highway 27	Southeast of Junction	Fort Stockton	
U.S. Highway 290	State Highway 196	Fort Stockton	East of Kent	
U.S. Highway 377	State Highway 10	Denton	Stephenville	
U.S. Highway 380	State Highway 15	West of Albany	Lueders	
U.S. Highway 380	State Highway 18	Lueders	Jayton	
U.S. Highway 380	State Highway 84	Southwest of Jayton	New Mexico	
State Highway 1	State Highway 1	Cockrell Hill	Dallas	
State Highway 3	State Highway 3	Waelder	Seguin	
State Highway 4	State Highway 4	Brownsville	Boca Chica	
State Highway 5	State Highway 5	South of Dumas	Hartley	
State Highway 6	State Highway 6	Waco	Hempstead	
State Highway 6	State Highway 242	Hockley	Sugar Land	
State Highway 6	State Highway 38	Sugar Land	Northwest of Galveston	
State Highway 7	State Highway 7	Joaquin	Nacogdoches	
State Highway 7	State Highway 266	Nacogdoches	Ratcliff	originally planned as part of 103; eventually built farther southeast
State Highway 7	State Highway 103	Ratcliff	Crockett	originally planned to stay 103
State Highway 8	State Highway 8	Arkansas	West of Maud	
State Highway 9	State Highway 9	Three Rivers	Corpus Christi	
State Highway 10	State Highway 10	Whitesboro	Denton	
State Highway 11	State Highway 11	Ladonia	Daingerfield (SH 11 began to overlap with SH 49 from Daingerfield to Hughes Springs)	
State Highway 11	State Highway 47	Hughes Springs	Texarkana	
State Highway 14	State Highway 14	Richland	Bremond	
State Highway 15	State Highway 15	Lueders	New Mexico	Was proposed to be replaced by a new US highway in December 1938, but this was not approved until August 4, 1943.
State Highway 16	State Highway 120	Graham	South of Strawn	This was originally planned to become part of 81.
State Highway 16	State Highway 81	South of Strawn	Fredericksburg	This was originally planned to stay 81.
State Highway 16	State Highway 16	Fredericksburg	San Antonio	This was originally planned to become part of 81, but was changed because it would have crossed US 81.
State Highway 16	State Highway 9	San Antonio	South of San Antonio	originally planned as 287
State Highway 17	State Highway 17	Pecos	Marfa	
State Highway 18	State Highway 18	Matador	Pampa	
State Highway 19	State Highway 19	Fruitvale	Palestine	
State Highway 20	State Highway 20	Austin	Paige	
State Highway 21	State Highway 21	Paige	Louisiana	
State Highway 22	State Highway 22	Corsicana	Hamilton	
State Highway 24	State Highway 24	Paris	Newcastle	
State Highway 24	State Highway 120	Newcastle	East of Aspermont	
State Highway 26	State Highway 11	Oklahoma	Daingerfield	
State Highway 26	State Highway 149	Daingerfield	Longview	
State Highway 26	State Highway 26	Longview	Nacogdoches	
State Highway 27	State Highway 27	Southeast of Junction	Comfort	
State Highway 31	State Highway 31	Waco	Tyler	
State Highway 31	State Highway 176	Tyler	Kilgore	
State Highway 34	State Highway 34	Honey Grove	Ennis	
State Highway 34	State Highway 306	Ennis	Italy	
State Highway 35	State Highway 35	Gregory	Houston	
State Highway 37	State Highway 37	Oklahoma	Mineola	
State Highway 43	State Highway 43	Caddo Lake State Park	Henderson	
State Highway 44	State Highway 16	Corpus Christi	Robstown	
State Highway 44	State Highway 44	Robstown	Alice	
State Highway 45	State Highway 45	Northeast of Anderson	Huntsville	
State Highway 45	State Highway 19	Huntsville	Crockett	
State Highway 48	State Highway 48	Brownsville	East of Brownsville	
State Highway 49	State Highway 49	Mount Pleasant	Louisiana	
State Highway 53	State Highway 53	Rosebud	Temple	
State Highway 59	State Highway 175	Saint Jo	Montague	swapped with 59
State Highway 59	State Highway 59	Montague	Bowie	
State Highway 63	State Highway 63	Zavalla	Jasper	originally planned as part of US 287 Alternate
State Highway 63	State Highway 45	Jasper	Louisiana	originally planned as 296
State Highway 64	State Highway 64	Henderson	Wills Point	
State Highway 68	State Highway 68	Stephenville	Gorman	
State Highway 70	State Highway 70	San Angelo	Jayton	
State Highway 70	State Highway 18	Jayton	Dickens	
State Highway 71	State Highway 71	Bastrop	Midfield	
State Highway 72	State Highway 72	Cuero	Three Rivers	
State Highway 72	State Highway 202	Three Rivers	Cotulla	
State Highway 73	State Highway 73	Alleyton	Houston	
State Highway 73	State Highway 228	Houston	Anahuac	
State Highway 73	State Highway 125	Anahuac	Stowell	temporary 73; became 65 in 1961
State Highway 73	State Highway 228	Stowell	Port Arthur	
State Highway 74	State Highway 74	Liberty Hill	Lampasas	
State Highway 77	State Highway 260	Commerce	Naples	
State Highway 77	State Highway 77	Naples	Louisiana	
State Highway 80	State Highway 80	Wimberley	Karnes City	
State Highway 80	State Highway 312	Karnes City	Atascosa/Karnes County Line	
State Highway 81	State Highway No. "F" (feeder road)	Llano	Brady	This was originally planned to become 283 instead.
State Highway 82	State Highway 82	New Mexico	Fort Stockton	
State Highway 95	State Highway 95	Temple	Bastrop	
State Highway 96	State Highway 44	Sinton	Robstown	
State Highway 96	State Highway 16	Robstown	Riviera	
State Highway 96	State Highway 96	Riviera	Harlingen	
State Highway 107	State Highway 107	Combes	Edinburg	
State Highway 107	State Highway 250	Edinburg	Mission	
State Highway 107	State Highway 48	Mission	Hidalgo	appears in 1937
State Highway 111	State Highway 95	Hochheim	Yoakum	
State Highway 111	State Highway 111	Yoakum	Midfield	
State Highway 118	State Highway 118	Big Bend National Park	Fort Davis (SH 118 began to overlap with SH 17 and SH 166 from Fort Davis to northwest of Fort Davis)	
State Highway 118	State Highway 233	northwest of Fort Davis	Kent	
State Highway 124	State Highway 125	Beaumont	Stowell	
State Highway 124	State Highway 124	Stowell	High Island	
State Highway 137	State Highway 137	Brownfield	Lamesa	
State Highway 137	State Highway 303	Lamesa	South of Lamesa	
State Highway 137	State Highway 271	South of Lamesa	Sheffield	
State Highway 149	State Highway 149	Longview	Carthage	
State Highway 152	State Highway 152	Dumas	Oklahoma	
State Highway 154	State Highway 155	Marshall	Gilmer	
State Highway 154	State Highway 154	Gilmer	Northeast of Cooper	
State Highway 155	State Highway 155	Gilmer	Northeast of Tyler	
State Highway 159	State Highway 159	Oldenburg	Southwest of Oldenburg	
State Highway 160	State Highway 160	Whitewright	North of Blue Ridge	
State Highway 171	State Highway 171	Mexia	Covington	actually began at Coolidge (Mexia to Coolidge was US 84; US 84 went on what is now FM 73)
State Highway 171	State Highway 2A	Covington	Cleburne	
State Highway 171	State Highway 122	Cleburne	Weatherford	
State Highway 173	State Highway 173	Hondo	Jourdanton	
State Highway 173	State Highway 241	Jourdanton	Hebbronville	
State Highway 174	State Highway 174	Iredell	Cleburne	
State Highway 174	State Highway 2A	Cleburne	Burleson	
State Highway 175	State Highway 59	Montague	Nocona	swapped with pre-1939 175
State Highway 183	State Highway 183	East of Mesquite	Dallas	
State Highway 183	State Highway 15	Dallas	Fort Worth	originally planned as part of US 287 Alternate
State Highway 185	State Highway 185	Northeast of Tivoli	Seadrift	
State Highway 185	State Highway 27	Seadrift	Port O'Connor	
State Highway 194	State Highway 194	Dimmitt	Plainview	
State Highway 194	State Highway 280	Plainview	Tahoka	
State Highway 199	State Highway 199	Northwest of Jacksboro	Olney	
State Highway 199	State Highway 24	Olney	Seymour	
State Highway 200	State Highway 200	Wharton	Gonzales	
State Highway 200	State Highway 112	Gonzales	Nixon	
State Highway 222	State Highway 222	Knox City	Munday	
State Highway 222	State Highway 252	Munday	East of Benjamin	
State Highway 237	State Highway 237	South of Carmine	Southwest of Oldenburg	
State Highway 237	State Highway 159	Southwest of Oldenburg	La Grange	
State Highway 238	State Highway 238	Inez	Port Lavaca	
State Highway 238	State Highway 27	Port Lavaca	Seadrift	
State Highway 251	State Highway 24	Olney	Newcastle	
State Highway 251	State Highway 251	Newcastle	Fort Belknap	
State Highway 257	State Highway 257	Laredo	George West	became 202 a month later
State Highway 257	State Highway 202	George West	Refugio	returned to being 202 a month later
State Highway 282	State Highway 18	Spearman	Oklahoma	
State Highway 283	State Highway 16	Sagerton	Oklahoma	This was originally planned to stay 16
State Highway 284	State Highway 74A	Lometa	Goldthwaite	
State Highway 285	State Highway 16	Riviera	Falfurrias	
State Highway 285	State Highway 285	Falfurrias	Hebbronville	added by hand on 1939 map
State Highway 286	State Highway 96	Corpus Christi	Chapman Ranch	96 formerly continued west from Chapman Ranch to Bishop but this section was deleted on July 15, 1935
State Highway 288	State Highway 19	Houston	Freeport	
State Highway 289	State Highway 14	West of Sherman	Dallas	
State Highway 290	State Highway 24	Lubbock	New Mexico	
State Highway 291	State Highway 2A	North of Itasca	Covington	
State Highway 292	SH 68 Spur	Keene	Keene	
State Highway 293	State Highway 103	Ratcliff	Milam	returned to being 103 a month later
State Highway 294	State Highway 7	Northeast of Oakwood	Alto	
State Highway 295	State Highway 44	Hallettsville	Victoria	
State Highway 297	State Highway 95	Flatonia	Yoakum	returned to being 95 two months later
State Highway 319	State Highway 34	Jacksboro	Fort Worth	proposed to be 281 but changed as it crossed US 281; became part of 199 a month later

Routes not in the above table; if nothing is stated no changes were made

- U.S. Highway 80 Alternate (Fort Worth): dashed on inset starting in 1938; was State Highway 1C
- State Highway 23: Brady to Menard deleted on July 15, 1935
- State Highway 25
- State Highway 29
- Spur to Retrieve Prison Farm (First SH 58 Spur, redesignated SH 35 Spur April 10, 1934): deleted on July 15, 1935
- State Highway 36
- State Highway 36A: became 221 on August 27, 1935, but 221 was deleted on January 6, 1939
- State Highway 39
- State Highway 41
- State Highway 46: continued from New Braunfels to Seguin until July 15, 1935 and became FM 25 in 1942 (but became part of SH 46 again in 1988!)
- State Highway 51
- State Highway 52
- State Highway 55: Uvalde to San Diego and Rocksprings to south of Junction deleted on July 15, 1935, but Rocksprings to south of Junction restored on November 19, 1935 and Uvalde to Dilley restored on January 18, 1937
- State Highway 57: became 35 on April 10, 1934
- State Highway 58: became 35 on April 10, 1934
- State Highway 60
- State Highway 61
- State Highway 62
- State Highway 67
- State Highway 76
- State Highway 78
- State Highway 79
- State Highway 80
- State Highway 83: became 15 on August 8, 1935 (not effective until September 1, 1935)
- State Highway 85
- State Highway 86
- State Highway 87
- State Highway 88: became 18 on May 24, 1938
- State Highway 89: Weatherford to Gainesville deleted on July 15, 1935; rest became part of 1 in 1938/1939
- State Highway 90
- State Highway 91
- State Highway 92: went southwest from Hamlin to Longworth until July 15, 1935 (now FM 57)
- State Highway 93: became 36 on July 25, 1933, but was reused for old 97 on December 20, 1937 and became part of 97 again four months later
- State Highway 94
- State Highway 95: Elgin to Flatonia deleted on July 15, 1935, but Elgin to Bastrop restored on June 19, 1936
- State Highway 97: Hebbronville to Rio Grande City deleted on July 15, 1935, restored on December 20, 1937, replaced 241, old route became 93; changes undone four months later
- State Highway 98
- State Highway 99: became 10 on July 23, 1934
- State Highway 100
- State Highway 101
- State Highway 102
- State Highway 104
- State Highway 105
- State Highway 108
- State Highway 109
- State Highway 110
- State Highway 113
- State Highway 114
- State Highway 115
- State Highway 116: became 14 on April 10, 1934
- State Highway 117
- State Highway 118
- State Highway 119
- State Highway 121
- State Highway 123
- State Highway 126: became 222 on August 27, 1935
- State Highway 127
- State Highway 128: became 44 on November 24, 1936 but was reassigned to portion of 72; new 128 was renumbered 237 on December 22, 1936
- State Highway 129: became 23 on July 23, 1934
- State Highway 131
- State Highway 132: became 146 on September 22, 1932
- State Highway 133: became 105 on July 12, 1933
- State Highway 134
- State Highway 135
- State Highway 136
- State Highway 139
- State Highway 140: SH 31 to Tyler Fish Hatchery, deleted on July 30, 1934
- State Highway 141: section west of what is now US 281 (then SH 66) deleted on July 15, 1935
- State Highway 142
- State Highway 143: became 51 on July 16, 1934
- State Highway 144
- State Highway 145: became Spur 73 in renumbering, then FM 75 in 1943
- State Highway 146
- State Highway 147
- State Highway 148
- State Highway 150
- State Highway 151
- State Highway 153: deleted on July 15, 1935 (sections restored as latereal road cancelled upon completion)
- State Highway 156
- State Highway 157
- State Highway 158
- State Highway 161: became 70 on January 22, 1931 (old 70 was deleted and is now FM 610)
- State Highway 162
- State Highway 163
- State Highway 164
- State Highway 165
- State Highway 166: spur to McDonald Observatory was SH 166A.
- State Highway 167
- State Highway 168: unconstructed portion cancelled on February 12, 1934; remainder became 97 on March 13, 1934
- State Highway 169: became 89 on November 30, 1932
- State Highway 170
- State Highway 172
- State Highway 177
- State Highway 178: became 152 on June 21, 1938
- State Highway 179
- State Highway 180: SH 5 to Annona, deleted on January 25, 1938; restored as 5 spur on February 20, 1939; became Spur 23 in renumbering; became FM 44 in 1942
- State Highway 181
- State Highway 182
- State Highway 184
- State Highway 186
- State Highway 187
- State Highway 188
- State Highway 189: Artesia Wells to Catarina, deleted on July 15, 1935, but became FM 133 in 1945
- State Highway 190: became 29 on March 19, 1934
- State Highway 192: became 27 on June 20, 1933
- State Highway 193
- State Highway 194
- State Highway 195
- State Highway 197
- State Highway 198
- State Highway 201: deleted on September 11, 1934 (later 222 and 252); now FM 267
- State Highway 203
- State Highway 204
- State Highway 205
- State Highway 206: pre-1939 continued east from Cross Plains on overlap with not-yet-built SH 36
- State Highway 207
- State Highway 208
- State Highway 209: became 152 on June 21, 1938
- State Highway 210: deleted on July 15, 1935
- State Highway 211: deleted on January 6, 1939, restored on January 22, 1940, only to become FM 50 and Spur 197 in 1942
- State Highway 212: deleted on July 15, 1935
- State Highway 213
- State Highway 214
- State Highway 215: deleted on April 28, 1937 due to the first Farm to Market Road being nearby.
- State Highway 216: became 158 on February 11, 1937
- State Highway 217
- State Highway 218
- State Highway 219
- State Highway 220
- State Highway 221: through Heidenheimer, deleted on January 6, 1939
- State Highway 223
- State Highway 224: SH 6 to TAMU, gone on September 26, 1939
- State Highway 225
- State Highway 226
- State Highway 227
- State Highway 229: became PR 12 during the renumbering
- State Highway 230
- State Highway 231
- State Highway 232
- State Highway 234
- State Highway 235
- State Highway 236
- State Highway 239
- State Highway 240
- State Highway 243
- State Highway 244
- State Highway 245
- State Highway 246
- State Highway 247
- State Highway 248
- State Highway 249
- State Highway 253
- State Highway 254
- State Highway 255
- State Highway 256
- State Highway 258
- State Highway 259
- State Highway 261
- State Highway 262: deleted April 19, 1938; part became SH 303 on December 1, 1938; remainder became RM 87 in 1943, now SH 176 and SH 137
- State Highway 263: deleted on March 21, 1939; became FM 82 in 1943, now SH 121
- State Highway 264
- State Highway 265
- State Highway 267
- State Highway 268: deleted on August 31, 1939; became RM 380 in 1945
- State Highway 269
- State Highway 270
- State Highway 272
- State Highway 273
- State Highway 274
- State Highway 275
- State Highway 276
- State Highway 277
- State Highway 278
- State Highway 279
- State Highway 281: Proposed for SH 319
- State Highway 287: Proposed for SH 9 from US 87 to US 281
- State Highway 296: Proposed for SH 45 east of Jasper
- State Highway 298: Proposed for Spur 69
- State Highway 299
- State Highway 300
- State Highway 301
- State Highway 302
- State Highway 303
- State Highway 304
- State Highway 305
- State Highway 307
- State Highway 308
- State Highway 309
- State Highway 310: became part of PR 10 during or before the renumbering
- State Highway 311
- State Highway 313
- State Highway 314
- State Highway 315
- State Highway 316
- State Highway 317
- State Highway 318

Park Roads:

- Bastrop State Park Road 1
- Caddo Lake Park Road 2
- Davis Mountain Park Road 3
- Longhorn Cavern Park Road 4
- Palo Duro Canyon Park Road 5
- Big Bend National Park Road 6
- Meridian Park Road 7
- Big Spring Park Road 8
- San Jacinto Battle Ground State Park Road 9
- Lockhart State Park Road 10: replaced State Highway 310 before or during the renumbering
- Palmetto State Park Road 11
- Washington-On-The-Brazos State Park Road 12: was State Highway 229 before the renumbering
- Goose Island State Park Park Road 13: designated August 31, 1939 as State Highway 319, 35A, or 35 Spur before the renumbering?

Loops and Spurs:

- Uvalde Spur 1: 3 Spur
- Waco Loop 2: 2 Bypass (alternate route of 2 on 1937 map)
- New Braunfels Loop 3: 2 Bypass
- Buda Loop 4: 2 Loop
- Kyle Loop 5: 2 Loop
- Kirkland Loop 6: 5 Loop
- Jasper Loop 7: two routes called 8 Spur on each end that were connected during the renumbering
- Beaumont Loop 8: 8 Bypass ("by-pass" on 1937 map)
- Olton Spur 9: 28 Spur
- Grapevine Loop 10: 114 Loop or 121 Loop
- Wichita Falls Loop 11: 5 Loop
- Dallas Loop 12: 40 Bypass
- San Antonio Loop 13: 2 Loop
- Texarkana Loop 14: 47 Bypass
- Goldthwaite Loop 15: 7 Business
- El Paso Loop 16: 1 Loop
- Karnes City Loop 17: probably 123 Loop
- Oglesby Spur 18: 7 Spur
- Ringgold Loop 19 and Ringgold Spur 19: 2 Loop and 2 Tap
- Laredo Loop 20: 12 Loop
- Spur Spur 21: 18 Spur
- Peacock Spur 22: 18 Spur
- Annona Spur 23: 5 Spur
- Wiergate Spur 24: 87 Spur
- Langtry Spur 25: 3 Spur
- Lorenzo Spur 26: 24 Spur
- Sweet Home Spur 27: 72 Spur
- Danbury Spur 28: 35 Spur
- Forest Spur 29: 40 Spur
- Frost Spur 30: probably 22 Spur
- Blooming Grove Spur 31: probably 22 Spur
- Barry Spur 32: probably 22 Spur
- Frisco Spur 33: 24 Spur
- Chireno Loop 34: probably 21 Loop
- McMahan Chapel Spur 35: probably 21 Spur
- Keltys Loop 36: 40 Loop
- Keltys Loop 37: 5 Loop
- Bogata Loop 38: 49 Business
- Klondike Spur 39: 24 Spur
- Santo Spur 40: 1 Spur (originally 89 Spur)
- Mobeetie Spur 41: 152 Spur
- Roaring Springs Loop 42: 18 Spur
- Tatum Loop 43: 43 Loop
- Levelland Loop 44: 24 Loop
- Southland Spur 45: 7 Spur
- Post Loop 46: 7 Loop
- Bovina Loop 47: 33 Loop
- Austin Spur 48: 71 Spur
- Corsicana Spur 49: probably 22 Spur
- Burleson Loop 50 and Burleson Spur 50: probably 174 Loop and 174 Spur
- Yoakum Loop 51: 72 Bypass
- Columbus Spur 52: 71 Spur
- West Spur 53: probably 2 Spur
- Thornton Spur 54: 14 Spur
- Brandon Spur 55: 22 Spur
- Mertens Spur 56: 22 Spur
- Conroe Spur 57: probably 19 Spur
- Sugar Land Spur 58: 38 Spur
- West Columbia Spur 59: 36 Spur
- LaRue Loop 60: probably 40 Loop
- Eustace Loop 61: probably 40 Loop
- Rusk Loop 62: probably 40 Loop
- Malakoff Spur 63: 31 Spur
- Trinidad Spur 64: probably 31 Spur
- Baxter Spur 65: 40 Spur
- Kilgore Spur 66: 26 Loop
- Ackerly Spur 67: 9 Spur
- Buna Loop 68: 8 Loop
- Deweyville Spur 69: 87 Spur (planned as SH 298)
- Rockport Loop 70: probably 35 Loop
- Fannin's Grave Spur 71: 29 Spur
- Sinton Spur 72: 16 Spur
- Princeton Spur 73: SH 145
- Whiteface Spur 74: 24 Spur
- Lockney Loop 75: 28 Loop and 28 Spur
- O'Donnell Loop 76: 9 Loop
- Tulia Loop 77: 9 Loop
- McDonald Observatory Spur 78: SH 166 Spur
- Stinnett Loop 79: old alignment of SH 152
- Arp Spur 80: old alignment of SH 64
