= Texas State Highway 1 =

Former state highway in Texas, United States

State Highway 1
- Texarkana, Dallas, Fort Worth, and El Paso Highway

Route information
- Maintained by TxDOT
- Length: 837.421 mi (1,347.698 km)
- Existed: June 21, 1917–August 20, 1952
- History: Replaced by US 80 and several other highways on September 26, 1939; Designated to short spur route located in Dallas on September 26, 1939; Cancelled and redesignated to State Loop 260 on August 20, 1952

Major junctions
- West end: New Mexico state line, near El Paso
- US 70 in El Paso; US 90 in Van Horn; US 385 in Big Spring; US 83 / US 277 in Abilene; US 283 in Cisco; US 377 in Fort Worth; US 81 in Fort Worth; US 67 in Dallas; US 80 in Dallas; US 271 in Mount Pleasant
- East end: Arkansas state line, in Texarkana

Location
- Country: United States
- State: Texas

Highway system
- Highways in Texas; Interstate; US; State; Former; Toll; Loops; Spurs; FM/RM; Park; Rec
← SH OSR	→ Loop 1

State Highway 1 (SH 1) was a state highway in the U.S. state of Texas. The highway traveled from Texarkana on the eastern border to El Paso on the western border, via Dallas and Fort Worth, Abilene, and Midland–Odessa. SH 1 was approximately 842 miles (1,355 km) long, and was one of the original 25 Texas state highways, which were designated on June 21, 1917. In 1920, the entire length of the highway was designated as part of the Bankhead Highway, a transcontinental Auto trail. In the Texas Department of Transportation's 1939 state highway renumbering, most of SH 1 was redesignated as U.S. Route 80, as well as U.S. Route 67, and others. Most of these highways were replaced by Interstate 10, Interstate 20, and Interstate 30. The only portion of SH 1 that existed after September 26, 1939, was a short spur located in Dallas. Texas State Highway 1 was officially cancelled on August 20, 1952. Due to the highway's historic value, a highway cannot be designated as State Highway 1 unless by the order of TxDOT Executive Director or by the Transportation Commission.

Texas State Highway 1 had several long spur routes. Most of these were simply numbered as State Highway 1, and were renumbered within a few years. Three of these spurs were separately numbered. They were Texas State Highway 1A, which was a long alternate route of SH 1 that traveled from Abilene to just west of Palo Pinto, Texas State Highway 1B, which was a short spur located in Dallas that was redesignated as SH 1 in 1939, and Texas State Highway 1C, which was a short spur located in Fort Worth that was redesignated at US 80 in 1939.

== Route description ==
In terms of today's Interstate Highways, the routing of SH 1 is followed by Interstate 10 (I-10) from New Mexico to east of Van Horn, I-20 to west of Fort Worth, and I-30 to Texarkana.

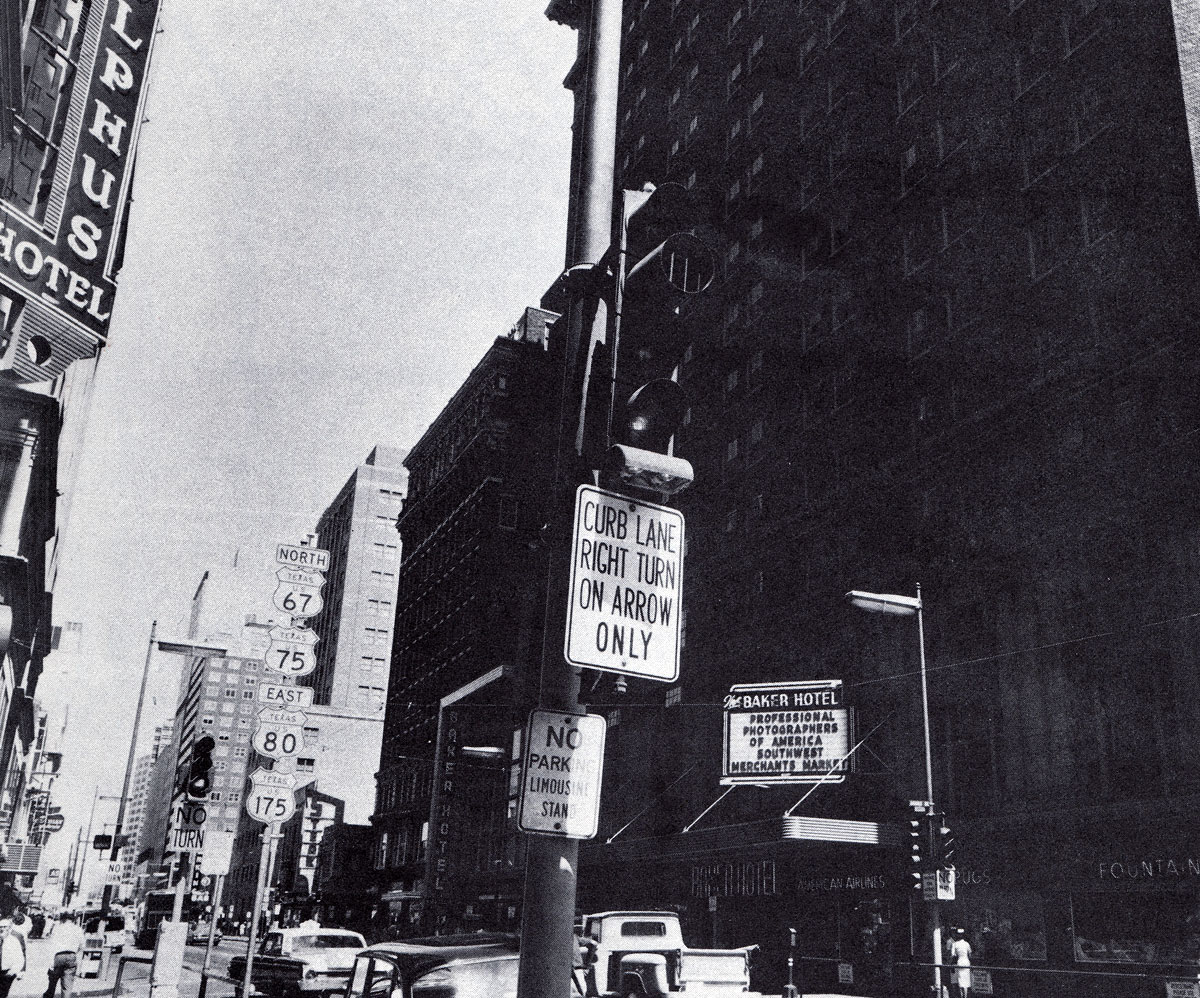
U.S. Route 80 in Dallas in 1965. This was formerly SH 1

== History ==
SH 1 was assigned on June 21, 1917, as one of the original 25 state highways. Known as the Texarkana, Dallas, Fort Worth and El Paso Highway, it crossed from Arkansas at Texarkana and ran west through Dallas, Fort Worth, Albany, Abilene, Big Spring and Van Horn to end in El Paso. On September 5, 1918, it had been extended northwest from El Paso to the New Mexico state line. In February 1920, the whole of SH 1 was included in the transcontinental Bankhead Highway, a marked auto trail.

In late 1926, the United States Numbered Highways were assigned. State Highway 1 kept its number, but was also assigned U.S. Highway 80 from New Mexico to Dallas and U.S. Highway 67 from Dallas to Texarkana.

By 1936, US 80 had been moved off SH 1 west of downtown Dallas. While SH 1 angled northeast on Fort Worth Avenue from Cockrell Hill, crossing the Trinity River on the Commerce Street Bridge, US 80 continued east on Davis Street, turning north on Zang Boulevard and over the Houston Street Viaduct. In downtown, US 80 turned east on Commerce Street (State Highway 15), and US 67, which had joined US 80 along Davis Street, turned east on Elm Street (SH 1). (Commerce Street and Elm Street later became a one-way pair.) On June 21, 1938, SH 1 Spur was designated to Santo. On December 1, 1938, SH 1 Loop was designated in El Paso.

On September 26, 1939, SH 1 was truncated to only this short piece west from downtown Dallas. The loop became Loop 16 (El Paso). The spur became Spur 40 (Santo). It split from US 80 (Davis Street) and ran northeast on Fort Worth Avenue and Commerce Street. Upon entering downtown Dallas, it split into the one-way pair of Commerce and Elm Streets, ending at US 80 (Houston Street). On August 20, 1952, the route was renumbered to Loop 260 and signed as U.S. Route 80 Business. Loop 260 was removed from the State Highway System and turned over to the City of Dallas on June 25, 1991, along with most of Loop 354.

=== Branches ===

In the original 1917 definition, SH 1 had a split between Abilene and Palo Pinto (west of Mineral Wells). Another split was present between Sulphur Springs and Texarkana, and a branch ran from the northern route at Naples east to State Highway 8 at Douglassville. SH 1 followed State Highway 39 from Greenville to Commerce and went southeast to Sulphur Springs when the route was decided. On February 19, 1918, the southern route between Sulphur Springs and Texarkana had become State Highway 1A, and a new State Highway 1B ran from SH 1 in Naples to Douglasville, and a new State Highway 1C ran southeast from SH 1A at Atlanta to the Louisiana state line. On March 20, 1918, SH 1A extended north from Texarkana north to the Red River (the Arkansas state line).

The southern route between Abilene and Palo Pinto was improved first. Thus it was designated as part of US 80 in 1926. The north route was redesignated on August 21, 1923, as State Highway 1A, and in 1932 was designated US 80N (later U.S. Highway 80 Alternate), On March 16, 1927, SH 1 was rerouted on the direct route between Sulphur Springs and Greenville, and the old route became part of SH 39 and SH 11. On August 8, 1935, all of SH 1A west of Albany was transferred to SH 15, but that was not effective until September 1 of that year. On October 23, 1935, US 80 and SH 1 were rerouted onto the direct route between Ranger and Weatherford, replacing part of State Highway 89, and US 80 Alt. was extended east to Weatherford; this did not become effective until paving on SH 89 from Strawn to Weatherford was completed. It was unknown what the old route would become, but on November 19, 1935, the section from Weatherford to Palo Pinto was already part of SH 15, and the section from Palo Pinto to Strawn would become part of an extended SH 120. The SH 1A designation was removed in the 1939 general redescription, and US 80 Alt. was replaced on September 6, 1943, by State Highway 351 and U.S. Highway 180.

The other branches, located east of Dallas, were all renumbered on August 21, 1923:

- The section of SH 1A from Commerce east to Daingerfield became part of State Highway 11. This road still carries SH 11. The section of SH 1A from Daingerfield to Hughes Springs became part of State Highway 49 and the section of SH 1A from Hughes Springs east to Atlanta became State Highway 48.
- SH 1B was renumbered to State Highway 77.
- SH 1C and the section of SH 1A from Atlanta north through Texarkana to the Red River became State Highway 47. On June 24, 1931, the section of SH 47 that replaced SH 1C became an extension of SH 77, and SH 47 was rerouted to Daingerfield, eliminating SH 48. On the September 26, 1939 redescription, SH 11 (which had gone north from Daingerfield) was extended east from Daingerfield along former SH 1A to the Red River, eliminating SH 47. (The short piece of SH 49 became a concurrency.) SH 11 was truncated to Linden on October 13, 1947, when the rest became part of U.S. Highway 59.

A branch was designated on Commerce Street in Dallas on March 13, 1931. On November 11, 1933, it was known as SH 1B. This was eliminated on September 26, 1939. Another SH 1C was designated on Lancaster Street on March 17, 1936. This was eliminated on September 26, 1939 (became US 80).

== Major junctions ==
County	Location	mi	km	Destinations	Notes
El Paso	Vinton	0.000	0.000	New Mexico state line / US 80	Western terminus. Western end of US 80 concurrency
El Paso	El Paso	21.763	35.024	US 70 / SH 33	Southern terminus of SH 33
El Paso	El Paso	23.695	38.133	US 62 / SH 130	Western terminus of US 62 and SH 130
Culberson	Van Horn	141.593	227.872	US 90 / SH 3 / SH 54	Southern terminus of SH 54, northern terminus of both US 90 and SH 3
Reeves		189.241	304.554	US 290 / SH 27	Western terminus of SH 27 and US 290
Reeves	Pecos	229.576	369.467	SH 17	
Ward	Pyote	254.372	409.372	SH 115	Southern terminus of SH 115
Ward	Monahans	263.922	424.741	SH 82	
Ector	Odessa	299.548	482.076	SH 137	
Howard	Big Spring	359.041	577.820	US 385 / SH 9	
Mitchell	Colorado	390.185	627.942	SH 101	Southern terminus of SH 101
Nolan	Roscoe	417.966	672.651	SH 7	Southern terminus of SH 7
Nolan	Sweetwater	189.241	304.554	SH 70	
Taylor	Abilene	466.898	751.399	US 83 / US 277 / SH 1A / SH 4 / SH 30	Southern terminus of SH 1A
Eastland	Cisco	511.937	823.883	US 283 / SH 23	
Eastland	Eastland	521.188	838.771	SH 67	
Palo Pinto		555.454	893.917	SH 1A	Eastern terminus of SH 1A
Palo Pinto	Mineral Wells	576.022	927.018	SH 66	Southern terminus of SH 66
Tarrant	Fort Worth	611.074	983.428	US 377 / SH 10	Western end of SH 10/US 377 concurrency
Tarrant	Fort Worth	623.046	1,002.695	US 81 / US 377 / SH 2 / SH 10	Eastern end of SH 10/US 377 concurrency
Tarrant	Fort Worth	624.697	1,005.352	SH 34	Northern terminus of SH 34
Dallas	Dallas	652.680	1,050.387	US 67 / SH 68	Northern terminus of SH 68. West end of US 67 concurrency
Dallas	Dallas	653.824	1,052.228	SH 6	
Dallas	Dallas	654.431	1,053.205	US 75 / US 77 / SH 40	Western end of SH 40 concurrency
Dallas	Dallas	656.620	1,056.727	US 175 / SH 40	Eastern end of SH 40 concurrency
Dallas	Dallas	659.372	1,061.156	US 80 / SH 15	Eastern end of US 80 concurrency
Dallas	Garland	668.440	1,075.750	SH 114 / SH 78	
1.000 mi = 1.609 km; 1.000 km = 0.621 mi: Concurrency terminus
