= U.S. Route 366 (1927–1932) =

Former U.S. Numbered Highway in New Mexico and Texas in the United States

U.S. Route 366

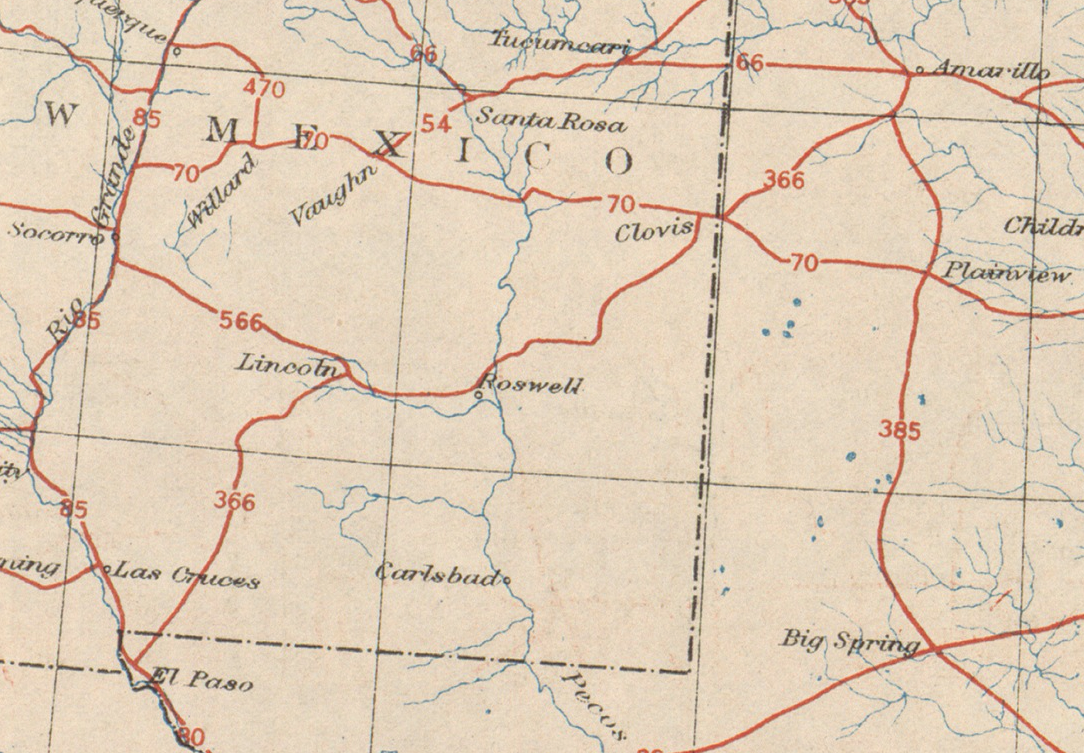
- Map of US 366

Route information
- Auxiliary route of US 66
- Length: 416 mi (669 km)
- Existed: 1927–June 1931

Major junctions
- West end: Mexico–United States border at El Paso, TX
- US 80 / SH 1 in El Paso; US 566 in Hondo, NM; US 70 / NM 18 in Clovis, NM; US 70 / SH 7 in Farwell, TX; US 385 / SH 9 in Canyon, TX; US 370 / SH 5 in Amarillo, TX
- East end: US 66 / SH 13 in Amarillo

Original alignment

Location
- Country: United States
- States: Texas, New Mexico

Highway system
- United States Numbered Highway System; List; Special; Divided

U.S. Route 366 or US 366 was the designation of two child routes of the former U.S. Route 66 in New Mexico and Texas in the United States during the late 1920s and 1930s. Both alignments of US 366 were original U.S. Routes created in 1927. The first alignment was a route from El Paso, Texas to Amarillo, Texas crossing through New Mexico that existed until 1931. The second was a route from Albuquerque, New Mexico to Willard, New Mexico that was previously assigned a different route number before 1932. That alignment was canceled in 1939.

== Route description ==
The original alignment of US 366 began at the international border between the U.S and Mexico in El Paso County. The route followed SH 33 and intersected US 80 in El Paso. US 366 then went northeast to Newman where it crossed the state line.

In New Mexico, US 366 passed through Orogrande in Otero County and then merged with NM 3 in Alamogordo and intersected NM 83 further north. The route intersected NM 52 and separated from NM 3. The highway then went to the northeast intersecting NM 24. The route then crossed into Lincoln County where it intersected NM 37 and then turned west intersecting US 566 in Hondo. In Chaves County, the highway turned north along NM 2 and intersected NM 13. A short distance north of Roswell the route turned northwest off of NM 2 and passed through Acme. In Kenna, the highway entered Roosevelt County where it intersected NM 92 and then merged with NM 18 in Portales. The route then turned north and entered Curry County. In Clovis, the route turned east off of NM 18 and on to US 70 and crossed the state line back into Texas.

At the state line, US 366 reacquired its secondary SH 33 and entered Farwell in Parmer County where it separated from US 70 and headed northeast. The route intersected SH 86 and passed through Friona before crossing into Deaf Smith County where it passed through Hereford. In Randall County, the highway joined the combined route of US 385 and SH 9. US 366 then went north to Amarillo where it entered Potter County. In Amarillo, the route merged with the combined route of US 370 and SH 5 before ending at US 66 and SH 13.

The segment of US 366 from El Paso to the state line was fully paved. In New Mexico, the route was classified in 1930 as a first class road for use all year. Most of the roadway in New Mexico was gravel; however, there was a fully paved segment between Roswell and Acme. Most of the roadway between Ruidoso and Hondo was merely graded as were two short segments between Acme and Kenna and between Elida and Portales. As late as 1933, most of the route in the Texas Panhandle was only graded, although the portion between the Deaf Smith-Randall county line to Amarillo was paved.

== History ==
US 366 was one of the original routes of the network of United States Numbered Highways as published by the American Association of State Highway Officials in 1927. The route branched off from its parent route US 66 in Amarillo, Texas and was then defined as passing through Canyon before crossing the New Mexico state line west of Farwell. The route then passed through Clovis, Portales, Roswell, Hondo, Alamogordo, and Orogrande before reentering Texas south of Newman. The route then continued through El Paso to the U.S.-Mexico border for a total length of 416 miles (669 km). Texas portions of the route were part of Texas State Highway 33 along both portions within the state. US 366 followed or replaced portions of New Mexico State Road 50, NM 3, NM 16, NM 13, NM 2, NM 18, and NM 15. The route was realigned in 1931 effective with the following year's route log and was replaced by US 54 from El Paso to Tularosa, NM, US 70 from Alamogordo to Farwell, US 60 from Clovis to Amarillo, and US 84 between Clovis and Farwell in 1935.

== Major intersections ==
State	County	Location	mi	km	Destinations	Notes
Texas	El Paso	El Paso			Mexican border	
Texas	El Paso	El Paso	0.00	0.00	US 80 / SH 1	Western terminus
New Mexico	Otero	Alamogordo			NM 5	
New Mexico	Otero	La Luz			NM 85	
New Mexico	Otero	Tularosa			NM 3 / NM 52	
New Mexico	Otero	Mescalero			NM 84	
New Mexico	Lincoln	Ruidoso			NM 37	
New Mexico	Lincoln	Hondo			US 566	
New Mexico	Chaves	Roswell			NM 2 / NM 15	
New Mexico	Roosevelt	Elida			NM 32	
New Mexico	Roosevelt	Portales			NM 18	
New Mexico	Curry	Clovis			US 70 / NM 18	
Texas	Parmer	Farwell			US 70 / SH 7	
Texas	Parmer	Bovina			SH 86	
Texas	Deaf Smith	No major junctions				
Texas	Randall	Canyon			US 385 / SH 9	
Texas	Potter	Amarillo			SH 5	
Texas	Potter	Amarillo			US 370 / SH 5	
Texas	Potter	Amarillo	416	669	US 66 / SH 13	Eastern terminus
1.000 mi = 1.609 km; 1.000 km = 0.621 mi
