= Decommissioned highway =

Road which is no longer in use, or route no longer officially authorized or maintained

A decommissioned highway is a highway that has been removed from service by being shut down, or has had its authorization as a national, provincial or state highway removed, the latter also referred to as downloading. Decommissioning can include the complete or partial demolition or abandonment of an old highway structure because the old roadway has lost its utility, but such is not always the norm. Where the old highway has continuing value, it likely remains as a local road offering access to properties denied access to the new road or for use by slow vehicles such as farm equipment and horse-drawn vehicles denied use of the newer highway.

Decommissioning can also include the removal of one or more of the multiple designations of a single segment of highway. As an example, what remains as U.S. Route 60 (US 60) between Wickenburg, Arizona, and Phoenix, Arizona, carried the routes of three US Highways (US 60, US 70, US 89) and one state highway (Arizona State Route 93). Since then, US 60 was diverted to other routes.

== United States ==
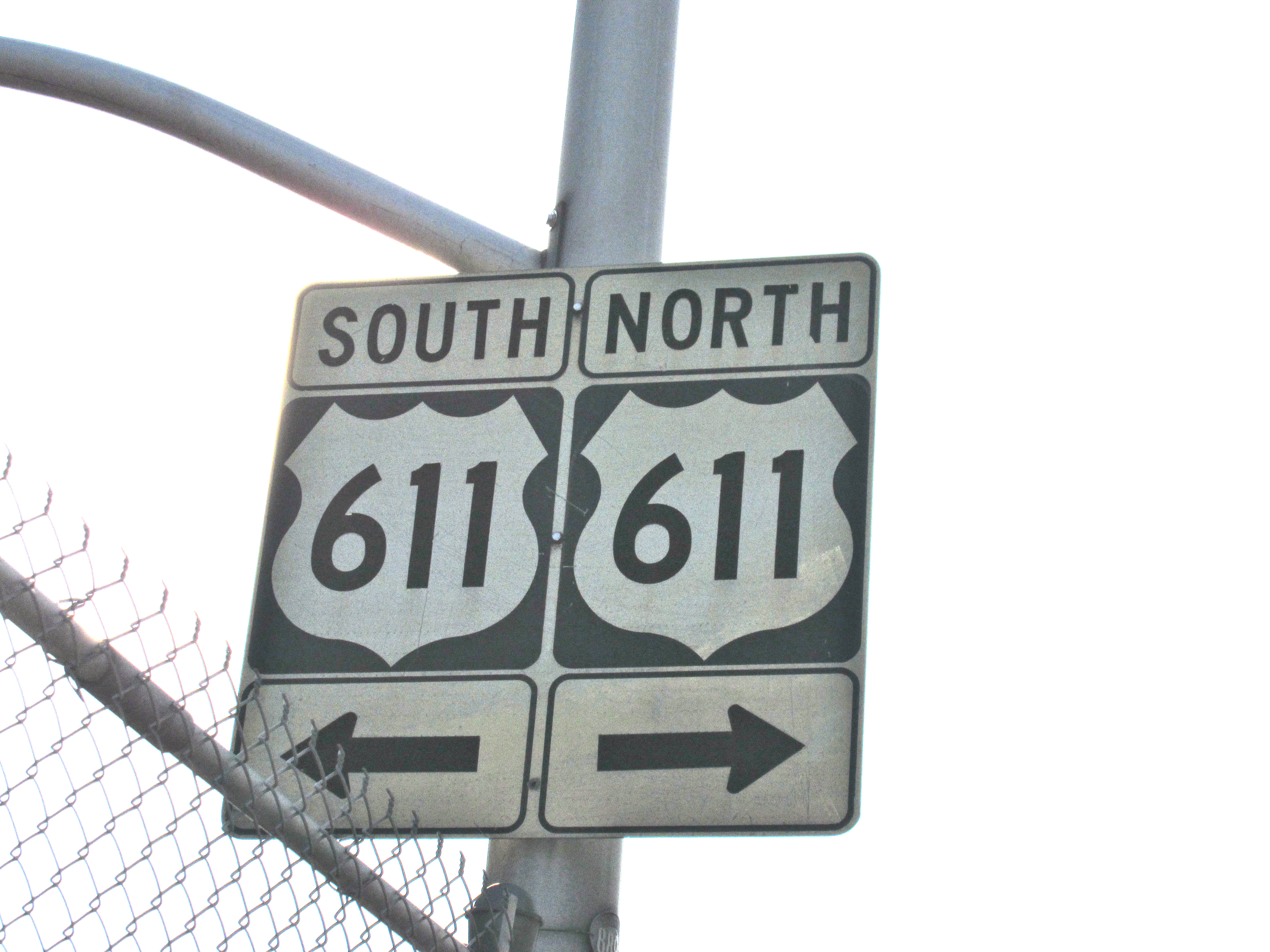
Pennsylvania Route 611 was known as US 611, but was downgraded to a state route as it was entirely in Pennsylvania. This old US 611 sign, along the ramp from Cheltenham Avenue to PA 611 on the border of Philadelphia and Cheltenham, was still present in 2014, but has been removed as of 2022.

Decommissioned highways are common in the United States. Even in the early years of the United States Numbered Highway System, some highways had short lives as US Highways especially if they were themselves short routes, such as the early US 110 in Wisconsin. Indeed, the fourteen shortest U.S. Numbered Highways that have ever existed had all been stripped of "US" status by 1982. Extensions of US Routes have implied the elimination of earlier designations; for example, US 6, which originally went no farther west than the Hudson River in New York, was extended to Long Beach, California over routes that included an old Indiana State Road 6, most of an old US 32 between Chicago and Omaha, all of US 38 between Omaha and Denver, and an old California State Route 7 mostly in the Mojave Desert. US 6 was itself pared back to Bishop, California, in the Great Renumbering of California in 1964.

As the states build freeways as a new classification of highways, the state may strip the old highway of its old designation as a numbered highway or downgrade it to a lesser status. For example, US 66, which connected Los Angeles and Chicago from 1926 until 1985, lost its designation as a U.S. Highway in favor of faster, more direct Interstate Highways which had supplanted it. Some highways may be partly decommissioned, such as two segments of M-21 in Michigan from Holland to Grand Rapids as Interstate 196 and between Flint and the Canadian border at the Blue Water Bridge as Interstate 69 (I-69) supplanted much of it and M-21 remained in existence between Grand Rapids and Flint. US 33 in Lancaster, Ohio, was signed as US 33 Business following relocation of US 33 and construction to Interstate Highway standards. Other highways have been wholly decommissioned in favor of newer Interstates, as was the case with Texas State Highway 9. However, the reverse can also be done, such as I-170 in Baltimore being removed in favor of US 40 (which was previously routed on parallel-running one-way streets) because its parent route (I-70) had been cancelled due to longstanding opposition.

Some state routes built on freeway alignments may be upgraded to Interstate Highway standards (or already built to Interstate standards) and receive Interstate designation, such as the case with Pennsylvania Route 60 being largely replaced by I-376. On the other hand, some routes are downgraded, as with US 61 in Minnesota, which became Minnesota State Highway 61 from Duluth to the Canadian border. At times, a state can abandon a number as the reason for state maintenance of the entire route no longer exists; Arizona transferred the short Arizona State Route 62 to the Mohave County government after a mine in Chloride closed and so did the economic purpose of the town. At the extreme a decommissioned route may be demolished, as was done with California State Route 480. Once part of the Interstate Highway System, it required retrofitting to remain in service after the 1989 Loma Prieta earthquake to remain in use; instead the highway was demolished.

"Alternate", "Bypass" and suffixed routes (such as US 6A in Connecticut, the old US 71 bypass around Kansas City that disappeared in favor of Interstate 435 and Missouri Route 291, and the former US 30S in Ohio) have often been redesignated as lesser routes, in accordance with a policy of the AASHTO that now deprecates such highways, especially if short and confined to one state.

Some states have decommissioned state highways which were within a state-numbered system because significant parts of those highways were not up to state standards, such as being unpaved and unlikely to ever be paved, as with Nevada State Route 49.

Indiana removed all state and US Highway designations in Indianapolis within the Interstate 465 beltway, either truncating the highway at the beltway (U.S. Highway 136), deleting the highway altogether (Indiana State Road 100), or diverting the routes onto the beltway. Similar removals happened in Fort Wayne after the completion of Interstate 469 in 1998.

A decommissioned route may also find other use besides automobile use. The Abandoned Pennsylvania Turnpike, a bypassed section of the Pennsylvania Turnpike that features two vehicle tunnels that were overcapacity after the Turnpike saw a surge in usage after World War II, is perhaps the most notable example of this, as it has since become a bike and pedestrian trail and, due to using the alignment for the stillborn South Pennsylvania Railroad, is also unofficially a rail trail.

Even as superhighways supplant older surface routes, some historical highways get attention from those with antiquarian (and commercial) interests in the continued recognition of such routes. US 66 in the midwestern and southwestern United States is a prime example of such efforts; "Historic Route US 66" markers, completely unofficial, designate most of the old surface road, some of which has literary significance (as in John Steinbeck's novel The Grapes of Wrath).

== Canada ==
Many of Quebec's Autoroutes supplant old through routes.

In New Brunswick, when a bypass road or freeway is constructed, it normally takes the number of the road it replaced, often removing portions of the old road from the provincial highway system entirely. Most become local or county roads; in some cases (such as the Moncton-Fredericton Highway 2, bypassed as freeway in 2001) a section of the old road would be retained as part of some other provincial highway because it reaches a major town the new road had bypassed.

In 1997 and 1998, the province of Ontario undertook a major highway decommissioning project, dropping over 5,000 kilometres (3,100 mi) of road from the provincially maintained highway system. Most of the former highways are now numbered as county roads. See also List of former provincial highways in Ontario.

The Thousand Islands Parkway in Ontario was originally four lanes and part of Ontario Highway 401, Canada's busiest highway, before 401 traffic was bypassed inland on completion of that freeway in 1968. Two of the lanes are provincially maintained for automobile traffic by the St. Lawrence Parks Commission but the other pair have been replaced with footpaths and a bicycle trail.

== Europe ==
In Germany, many Autobahns supplant an older through route, as in Bundesstraße 60 (best translated as Federal Highway 60), which disappeared as the A40 Autobahn supplanted it.

In the Republic of Ireland, National Primary Routes are often realigned after the construction of new motorway sections, dual carriageways or bypasses. The old route thus loses its national route status and is usually redesignated as a Regional Road.

== Australia ==
=== New South Wales ===
Most (old system) state and national routes in New South Wales are decommissioned routes. Among those was state route 30 between Ryde and Kellyville that existed between 1974 and 1993.
