= Auto trail =

Historic type of marked roadway

Auto trails
- Auto trail markers for the Dixie Highway, the Lincoln Highway, and the Old Spanish Trail

Highway names
- Interstates: Interstate X (I-X)
- US Highways: U.S. Route X (US X)
- State: Varies by state

The system of auto trails was an informal network of marked routes that existed in the United States and Canada in the early part of the 20th century. Marked with colored bands on utility poles, the trails were intended to help travellers in the early days of the automobile.

Auto trails were usually marked and sometimes maintained by organizations of private individuals. Some, such as the Lincoln Highway, maintained by the Lincoln Highway Association, were well-known and well-organized, while others were the work of fly-by-night promoters, to the point that anyone with enough paint and the will to do so could set up a trail. Trails were not usually linked to road improvements, although counties and states often prioritized road improvements because they were on trails.

In the mid-to-late 1920s, the auto trails were essentially replaced with the United States Numbered Highway System. The Canadian provinces had also begun implementing similar numbering schemes.

== Map ==
1922 map of auto trails
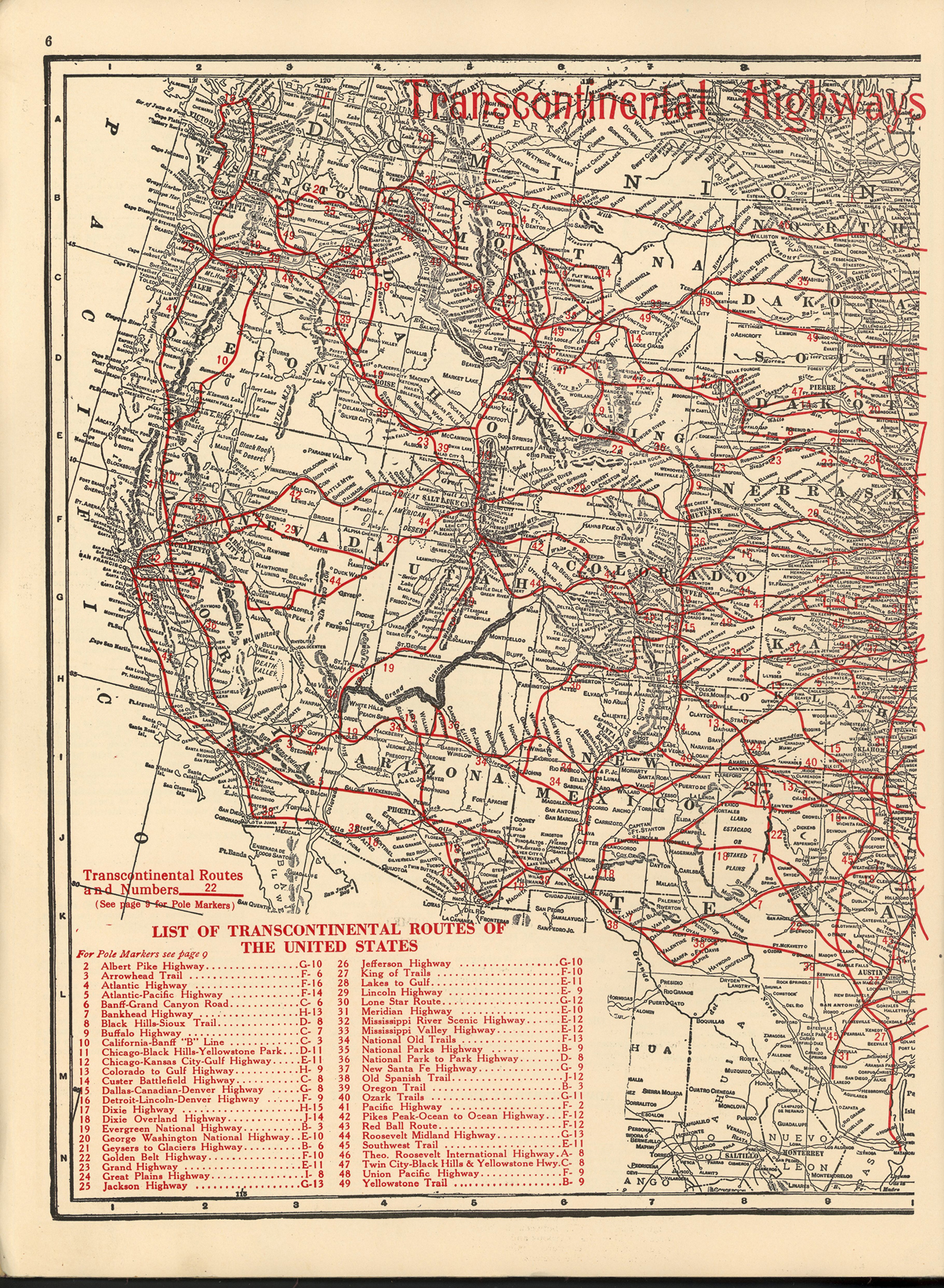
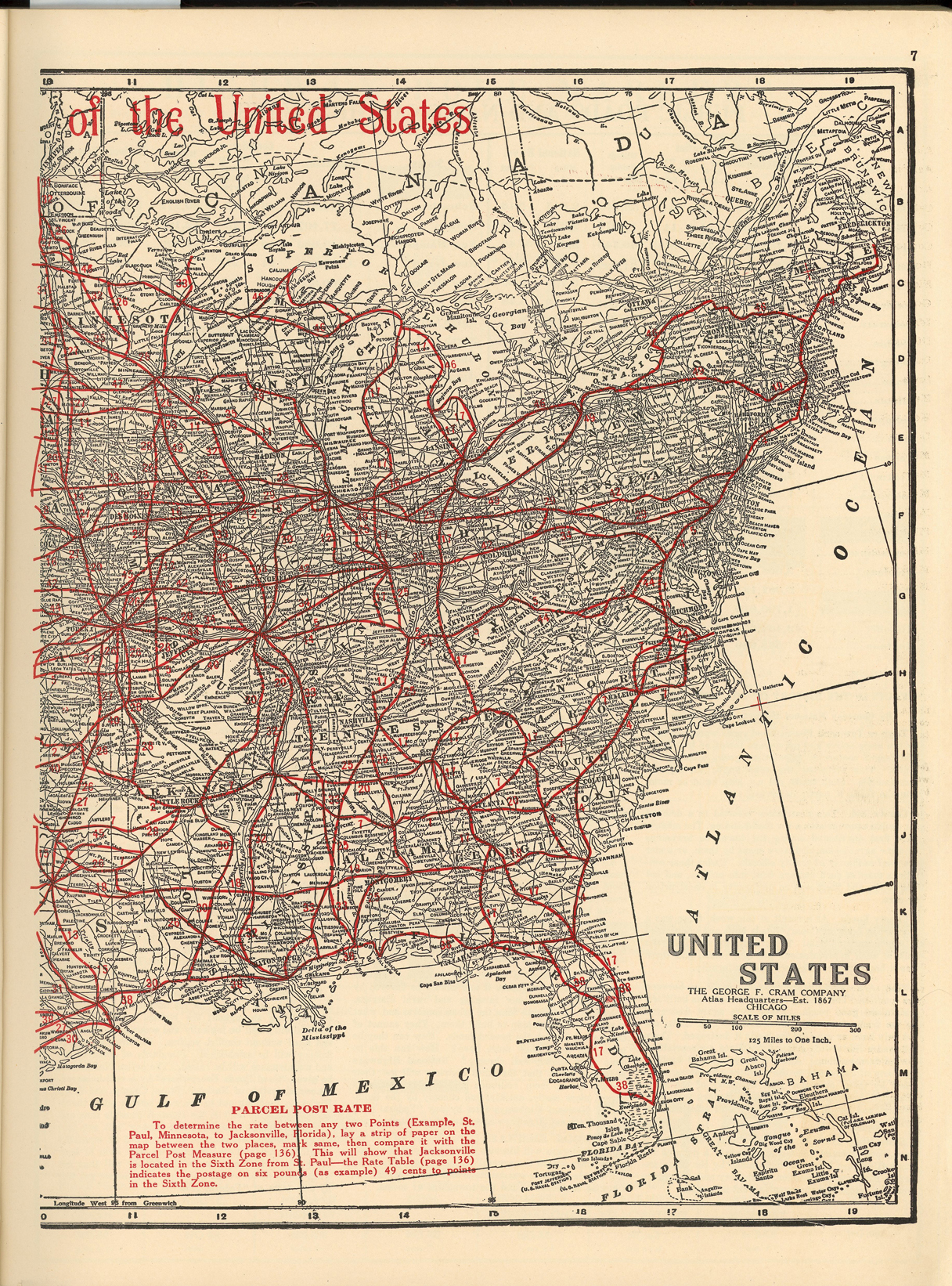

== List of auto trails ==
Name	North or east end	South or west end	U.S. Highways (approximate, based on 1926 plan and later additions)	Notes	Highway Marker
Albert Pike Highway	Hot Springs, Arkansas	Colorado Springs, Colorado	US 270, US 64, US 183, US 154, US 50, US 85		
Aroostook Trail	Old Town, Maine	Fairfield, Maine	SR 100 (Maine), US 2		
Arrowhead Trail	Salt Lake City, Utah	Los Angeles, California	US 91	Served four states: Utah, Arizona, Nevada, California	
Atlantic Highway	Calais, Maine	Miami, Florida	US 1, US 25, US 17, US 1	Served DC and 14 states: Maine, New Hampshire, Massachusetts, Rhode Island, Connecticut, New York, New Jersey, Pennsylvania, Maryland, Virginia, North Carolina, South Carolina, Georgia, and Florida	
Atlantic-Pacific Highway	New York, New York	Los Angeles, California	US 1, US 211, US 15, US 33, US 60, US 52, US 460, US 50, US 54, US 70, US 60		
Atlantic Yellowstone Pacific Highway	Chicago, Illinois	Sioux Falls, South Dakota	US 20, US 218, US 18		
Baltimore Pike	Philadelphia, Pennsylvania	Baltimore, Maryland			
Bankhead Highway	Washington, D.C.	San Diego, California	US 1, US 15, US 70, US 170, US 29, US 78, US 70, US 67, US 80		
Bee Line Highway	Chicago, Illinois	New Orleans, Louisiana	US 51		n/a
Ben Hur Highway	St. Louis, Missouri	Fort Dodge, Iowa			
Black and Yellow Trail	Chicago, Illinois	Yellowstone National Park	US 41, US 16, US 14, US 16, US 20		
Blackhawk Highway	Dixon, Illinois	Beloit, Wisconsin	Route 2 (Ill), US 51		n/a
Broadway Of America	New York, New York	San Diego, California	US 80, SR 87 (Ariz), SR 84 (Ariz), US 80, US 67, US 70, US 41, US 70S, US 70, US 11W, US 11, US 211, US 1, US 40, US 13, US 1	Later addition auto trail, established in 1930. One alignment used SR 87 and SR 84 between Gila Bend and Tucson, another followed US 80 between both cities.	n/a
California-Banff Bee Line	Los Angeles, California	Cranbrook, British Columbia			
Cannon Ball Route	Chicago, Illinois	Hannibal, Missouri			
Capital Route	Omaha, Nebraska	Austin, Texas			n/a
Chicago, Kansas City and Gulf Highway	Chicago, Illinois	Galveston, Texas			
Colorado to Gulf Highway	Denver, Colorado	Galveston, Texas, and Brownsville, Texas	US 85, US 385, US 370, US 81, US 181		
Columbia River Highway	Pendleton, Oregon	Portland, Oregon	US 30		
Cooley Highway	Grand Rapids, Minnesota	Sisseton, South Dakota			n/a
Cornhusker Highway	Sioux City, Iowa	Oklahoma City, Oklahoma			n/a
Custer Battlefield Highway	Omaha, Nebraska	Glacier National Park, Montana	US 75, US 16, US 116, US 87E, US 87		
Dallas-Canadian-Denver Highway	Boulder, Colorado	Galveston, Texas	US 85, US 50, US 83, US 70, US 77		
Daniel Webster Highway	Chartierville, Quebec	Franconia, New Hampshire			
Detroit-Lincoln-Denver Highway	Detroit, Michigan	Denver, Colorado	US 12, US 32, US 38		n/a
Dixie Highway	Chicago, Illinois, and Sault Ste. Marie, Michigan	Miami, Florida	Route 1 (Ill), US 136, US 31, SR 37 (Ind), US 150, US 31W		
Dixie Bee Line	Chicago, Illinois	Nashville, Tennessee	US 41, US 241		n/a
Dixie Overland Highway	Savannah, Georgia	San Diego, California	US 80, US 84, US 380, US 366, US 80		
Egyptian Trail	Chicago, Illinois	Cairo, Illinois, Illinois			n/a
Electric Highway	Forsyth, Montana	Helena, Montana	US 12, US 89		n/a
Evergreen National Highway	Victoria, British Columbia	El Paso, Texas	US 99, US 10, US 97, US 410, US 95, US 30, US 30N, US 91, US 95, US 66		n/a
Florida Short Route					n/a
French Lick Route	Cincinnati, Ohio	Evansville, Indiana	US 50, SR 37 (Ind), US 150, SR 56 (Ind), US 231, and SR 62 (Ind)		n/a
George Washington Memorial Highway	Cambridge, Massachusetts	Agawam, Massachusetts			n/a
George Washington National Highway	Savannah, Georgia	Seattle, Washington			n/a
Geysers-to-Glaciers Highway	Glacier National Park, Montana	Yellowstone National Park	US 89, US 2, MT 213		n/a
Glacier to Gulf Motorway	Calgary, Alberta	Tampico, Tamaulipas			n/a
Glacier Trail	Seattle, Washington	Jacksonville, Florida			n/a
Grant Highway	Chicago, Illinois	Portland, Oregon	US 20		n/a
Great Lakes to Florida Highway	Cleveland, Ohio	Yemassee, South Carolina	US 21		n/a
Great Plains Road	Portal, North Dakota	Brownsville, Texas			n/a
Great White Way	Davenport, Iowa	Council Bluffs, Iowa	US 6	Also known as the White Pole Road	n/a
International Peace Highway	Québec, Québec, and Rouses Point, New York	Laredo, Texas, and Mexico City			n/a
Jackson Highway	Chicago, Illinois	New Orleans, Louisiana	US 152, US 52, US 31, US 168, US 68, US 31, US 43, US 45, US 11		
Jefferson Highway	Winnipeg, Manitoba	New Orleans, Louisiana	US 59, US 2, US 71, US 10N, US 10, US 65, US 69, US 71/US 73E, US 73, US 75, US 69, US 67, US 271, US 80, US 171, US 71, US 61		
Jefferson Davis National Highway	Washington, D.C.	San Diego, California	US 1, SR 12 (Ga), US 29, US 80, US 43, US 90, US 96, US 277, US 90		
King of Trails	Winnipeg, Manitoba	Galveston, Texas, and Brownsville, Texas	US 75/US 81, US 75/US 77, US 75, US 73, US 73E, US 50, US 73W, US 75, US 77, US 81, US 181, US 96		n/a
Lackawanna Trail	Binghamton, New York	Delaware, New Jersey	US 11, US 611		n/a
Lakes to Gulf Highway	Duluth, Minnesota	Galveston, Texas			n/a
Lakes-to-Sea Highway	Atlantic City, New Jersey	Erie, Pennsylvania	US 30, US 120, US 22, US 322, US 19		n/a
Lee Highway	Washington, D.C.	San Diego, California	US 1, US 211, US 11, US 72, US 70, US 366, US 80, US 180, US 80, US 101		
Lewis and Clark Highway	Missoula, Montana	Lewiston, Idaho			n/a
Liberty Highway	New York, New York	Cleveland, Ohio	New Jersey 4, New Jersey 17, NY 17, NY 430, NY 394, US 20		
Lincoln Highway	New York, New York	San Francisco, California	US 1, US 30, US 40, US 93, US 50, US 99, US 48		
Logan-Lee Highway	Rock Island, Illinois	Paducah, Kentucky	US 67, Route 3 (Ill)		n/a
Lone Star Route	Chicago, Illinois	Lake Charles, Louisiana (earlier Brownsville, Texas)	US 66, US 67, US 63, US 165		n/a
Lone Star Trail	St. Augustine, Florida	Los Angeles, California	US 1, US 90, US 84, US 67, US 290, US 80, SR 86 (Ariz), US 80, SR 84 (Ariz), Maricopa–Casa Grande Highway (Ariz), Gila Bend–Maricopa Highway (Ariz), US 80		n/a
Magnolia Route					n/a
Meridian Highway	Winnipeg, Manitoba	Mexico City	US 81		n/a
Mississippi River Scenic Highway	Winnipeg, Manitoba, and Port Arthur, Ontario	Fort Myers, Florida, and Port Arthur, Texas	US 75, US 2, US 71, US 10N, US 10, US 61, US 55, US 61, US 90; US 49E, US 49, US 98, US 90, US 19, US 41		
Mississippi Valley Highway	Ely, Minnesota, Minnesota	Gulfport, Mississippi (earlier New Orleans, Louisiana)	US 53, US 61, US 55, US 161, US 67, US 51, US 45, US 11, US 49	Earlier known as the Burlington Way	n/a
National Old Trails Road	Washington, D.C., and Baltimore, Maryland	Los Angeles	US 240/US 40, US 40, US 50N, US 50, US 350, US 85, US 70, US 66	Served DC and 12 states: Maryland, Pennsylvania, West Virginia, Ohio, Indiana, Illinois, Missouri, Kansas, Colorado, New Mexico, Arizona, California	
National Park-to-Park Highway	Loop connecting National Parks		US 99, US 48, US 40, US 99E, US 99, US 10, US 195, US 95, US 2, US 87, US 87W, US 20, US 185, US 85, US 50, US 285, US 450, US 550, US 64, US 666, US 66		
National Parks Highway	Boston, Massachusetts, and New York, New York	Seattle, Washington		Also known as the Northwest Trail	n/a
National Roosevelt Midland Trail	Washington, D.C., and Newport News, Virginia (earlier Oyster Bay, New York)	Los Angeles, California	US 60, US 150, US 50, US 40, US 40N, US 40, US 40S, US 50, US 6		n/a
New Santa Fe Trail	Kansas City, Missouri	Los Angeles, California	US 50, US 350, US 85, US 66		n/a
Old Oregon Trail	Independence, Missouri	Seaside, Oregon, and Olympia, Washington	US 40, US 30, US 26, US 20, US 87E, US 30N, US 30		n/a
Old Spanish Trail	St. Augustine, Florida	San Diego, California	US 1, US 90, US 80		
Ozark Trail	Kansas City, Missouri; Hannibal, Missouri; St. Louis, Missouri; and Memphis, Tennessee	Denver, Colorado, Las Vegas, New Mexico, New Mexico, and El Paso, Texas	US 60, US 63, US 66		n/a
Pacific Highway	Vancouver, British Columbia	San Diego, California	US 99, US 40, US 101		
Pershing Way	Winnipeg, Manitoba	New Orleans, Louisiana			n/a
Pikes Peak Ocean to Ocean Highway	New York, New York	Los Angeles, California (earlier San Francisco, California)	US 22, US 250, US 36, US 136, US 36, US 40N, US 40S, US 50, US 91	Also known as the Pershing Transport Route	
Puget Sound-to-Gulf Highway					n/a
Red Ball Route					n/a
River-to-River Road	Davenport, Iowa	Council Bluffs, Iowa			
Southern National Highway					n/a
Southwest Trail	Chicago, Illinois	El Paso, Texas	US 32, US 65, US 50S, US 81, US 160, US 281, US 60, US 366		n/a
Susquehanna Trail	Buffalo, New York	Washington, D.C.	US 20, US 15, US 111/US 240		
Theodore Roosevelt International Highway	Portland, Maine	Portland, Oregon	US 302, US 2, US 11, US 104, US 23, US 2, US 95, US 195, US 295, US 410, US 30		
Three C Highway	Cleveland, Ohio	Cincinnati, Ohio	SR 3 (Ohio)		n/a
Transprovincial Highway	Ottawa, Ontario	Toronto, Ontario		Later Ontario Highway 2 and Ontario Highway 15	n/a
Victory Highway	New York, New York	San Francisco, California	US 1, US 40, US 40S, US 83, US 40N, US 40		
White River Trail	Springfield, Missouri	Ponca City, Oklahoma			n/a
White-way 7 Highway	Chicago, Illinois	Omaha, Nebraska	US 32	In Iowa, created from segments of the River to River Road from Davenport to Redfield, and the Great White Way from Dexter to Council Bluffs.	n/a
William Penn Highway	New York, New York	Pittsburgh, Pennsylvania	US 22		
Yellowstone Highway	Denver, Colorado	Yellowstone National Park			n/a
Yellowstone Trail	Plymouth, Massachusetts	Seattle, Washington	US 20, US 30, US 41, US 110, US 10, US 212, US 12, US 10, US 195, US 295, US 410, US 97, US 10		

== See also ==
- U.S. Highway association
