= Texas State Highway 32 =

State highway in Texas

State Highway 32

Route information
- History: Officially designated April 29, 2010

Major junctions
- West end: I-69E / US 77 / US 83 in Brownsville
- East end: SH 4 in Brownsville

Location
- Country: United States
- State: Texas
- Counties: Cameron

Highway system
- Highways in Texas; Interstate; US; State; Former; Toll; Loops; Spurs; FM/RM; Park; Rec
← SH 31	→ SH 33

State Highway 32 (SH 32) is a proposed loop around the southern side of Brownsville from Interstate 69E/US Highway 77/US Highway 83 (I-69E/US 77/US 83) to SH 4. The route is still in the planning stages.

== Route description ==
SH 32 is planned to begin at an intersection with I-69E/US 77/US 83 in Brownsville. From there, it will head southeast to Farm to Market Road 1419 (FM 1419). It will continue east along the alignment of FM 1419 to FM 3068. From this intersection, SH 32 will head northeast to its eastern terminus at SH 4.

== History ==
SH 32 was a route proposed on October 9, 1917, from Corsicana southeast to Huntsville. On September 26, 1939, this route was reassigned to US 75, with which it was cosigned before this. The current route was designated on April 29, 2010, over new locations and part of FM 1419.

Historic SH 32A

SH 32A was a spur designated on October 20, 1919, from Buffalo southwest via Jewett and Normangee to Navasota. On July 20, 1920, SH 32A was completely changed, so that it went from Navasota via Anderson and Singleton to Madisonville. This spur was renumbered as SH 90 on August 21, 1923.

== Major intersections ==
The entire route is in Cameron County.

Location	mi	km	Destinations	Notes
Brownsville	0.0	0.0	I-69E / US 77 / US 83	Planned western terminus
Brownsville			FM 1419 (Southmost Boulevard)	
			FM 3068 (Indiana Avenue)	
			SH 4 (Boca Chica Boulevard)	Planned eastern terminus
1.000 mi = 1.609 km; 1.000 km = 0.621 mi
