= Old Oregon Trail Highway =

The Old Oregon Trail Highway was an auto trail roughly following the Oregon Trail from Independence, Missouri to Seaside, Oregon and Olympia, Washington. In the U.S. Highway system, it became:

- US 40, Kansas City to Wamego (now partly US 24)
- No through road, Wamego to Grand Island via Marysville, Fairbury, Hebron, and Hastings
- US 30, Grand Island to Ogallala
- US 26, Ogallala to Dwyer
- US 185, Dwyer to Orin (now US 87)
- US 20, Orin to Casper
- US 87E, Casper to Muddy Gap (now WYO 220)
- No through road, Muddy Gap to Granger
- US 30N, Granger to Cotterel (now US 30)
- US 30, Cotterel to Astoria
- US 101, Astoria to Seaside
- US 99, Portland to Olympia (now I-5)

The name is still used in Oregon for Interstate 84 east of U.S. Route 730, which is named the Old Oregon Trail Highway No. 6 (see Oregon highways and routes).
