= Farm to Market Road 1419 =

Road in Texas, United States

Farm to Market Road 1419

Route information
- Maintained by TxDOT
- Length: 12.292 mi (19.782 km)
- Existed: 1949–present

Major junctions
- West end: SH 4 in Brownsville
- East end: SH 4

Location
- Country: United States
- State: Texas
- Counties: Cameron

Highway system
- Highways in Texas; Interstate; US; State; Former; Toll; Loops; Spurs; FM/RM; Park; Rec
← FM 1418	→ FM 1420

Farm to Market Road 1419 (FM 1419) is a farm to market road in Cameron County, Texas. It is the southernmost numbered route in the Texas state highway system.

== Route description ==
FM 1419 begins at an intersection with SH 4 west of downtown Brownsville. The route travels to the southeast, along Southmost Road, to an intersection with FM 511. The roadway then turns to the south, and then the east, to an intersection with FM 3086. After continuing to the east and passing the colonia of Southmost, FM 1419 turns to the north in South Point, and continues to its terminus at SH 4 near the Brownsville city limits.

== History ==
FM 1419 was originally designated on July 15, 1949, from the junction with FM 511 to South Point. On October 7 of that year, the northward extension from South Point to SH 4 was approved, replacing a section of FM 511. The eastern addition, to SH 4, was designated on September 21, 1955. On June 27, 1995, the western section of the route, from SH 4 to FM 511, was officially redesignated as Urban Road 1419 (UR 1419), but that section was changed back to FM 1419 on November 15, 2018. On April 29, 2010, the sections from 1.9 miles west of FM 3068 to FM 3068 and from .04 mile north of Dockberry Road to 0.7 miles south of SH 4 were redesignated as SH 32. The section from FM 3068 to .04 mile north of Dockberry Road was designated as FM 3550. The section from 0.7 miles south of SH 4 to SH 4 was redesignated as FM 3551. Since SH 32 has not been built yet, signage has not changed.

== Major intersections ==
The entire route is in Cameron County.

Location	mi	km	Destinations	Notes
Brownsville	0.0	0.0	SH 4 (International Blvd.)	Western terminus
Brownsville	2.7	4.3	FM 511 (Dockberry Rd.)	Northern terminus
	6.2	10.0	FM 3068 (Indiana Ave.)	
	12.3	19.8	SH 4 (Boca Chica Blvd.)	Eastern terminus
1.000 mi = 1.609 km; 1.000 km = 0.621 mi
