= Mississippi River Scenic Highway =

Former road in the United States

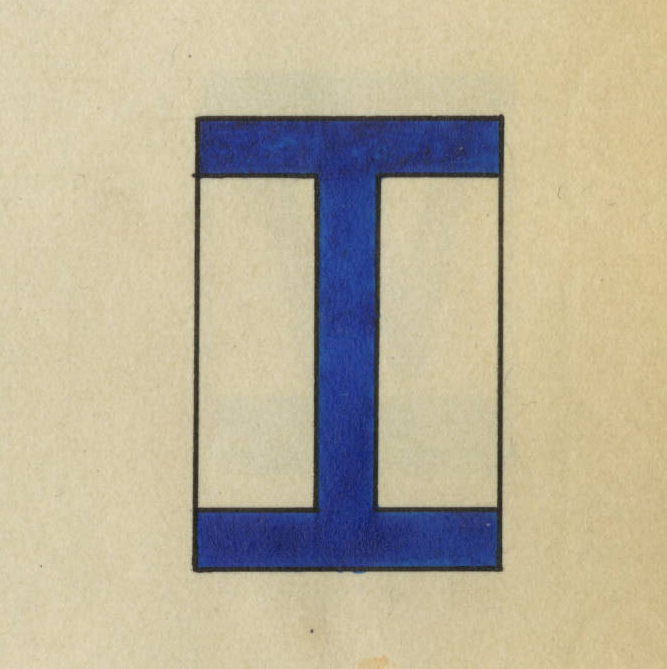
Mississippi River Scenic Highway

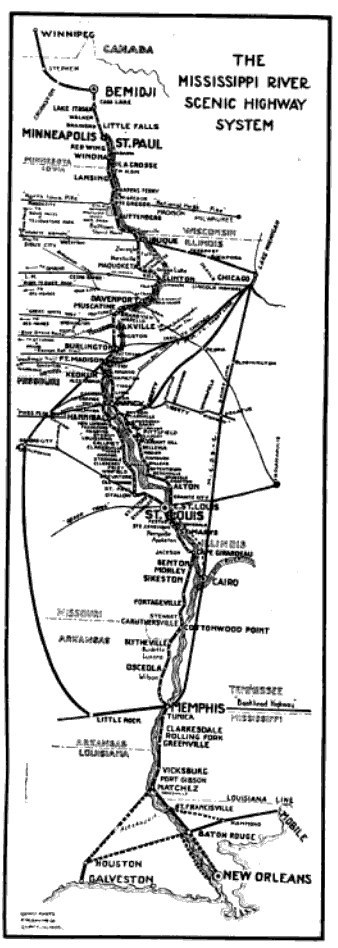

Route information
- Existed: 1920–present

Main Line
- North end: Winnipeg, MB
- South end: New Orleans, LA

Eastern division
- North end: Clarksdale, MS
- South end: Miami, FL

Location
- Country: United States
- States: Minnesota, Iowa, Illinois, Missouri, Kentucky, Tennessee, Louisiana, Mississippi, Alabama, Florida

Highway system
Auto trail

The Mississippi River Scenic Highway was an auto trail in the United States, created in 1919 to connect the US Midwest with the Southern United States. It was expanded to include a branch to Miami.

The Mississippi River Scenic Highway was part of a series of auto trails in the United States to promote travel along the Mississippi River. The organization was headquartered in St. Louis, though each state or division had their own organization, which worked with local cities and towns along the route. The highway has been largely replaced with Great River Road by the 1970s.

The route was marked by a blue capital letter "I", usually with a white background. As with other auto trails, the logo was commonly painted on utility poles.

== Route description ==
Officially the route description began at Lake Itasca in Minnesota but contemporary maps show Winnipeg as the northern terminous. From Lake Itasca the route traveled south through the Twin Cities to Dubuque, Iowa in what was called the northern division. The north central division took the route from Dubuque in Iowa to Quincy, Illinois. The Illinois section connected Quincy with St Louis. A south central division took the route between St Louis and Memphis, Tennessee while the southern division connected Memphis with New Orleans.

The highway crossed paths with other named auto trails, most notably the Lincoln Highway in Clinton, Iowa, the Pikes Peak Ocean to Ocean Highway in Hannibal, Missouri, the National Old Trails Road at St Louis and the Bankhead Highway at Memphis.

Later, a spur was added that connected the highway to Miami. This spur connected with the highway at Clarksdale, Mississippi and continued on through Florida terminating in Miami. It was co-signed as the Dixie Highway from Fort Myers, Florida to Miami.

== History ==
The route was originally conceived as a scenic route along the Mississippi River in Iowa but it was expanded to be a transcontinental road.

The modern Great River Road, which also follows the course of the Mississippi River, takes a similar route as the historical Mississippi River Scenic Highway.
