= Waelder Independent School District =

School district in Texas

Coordinates: 29°41′40.5″N 97°18′7″W

Address
- 201 US Highway 90 West Waelder, Texas, 78959; United States

District information
- Grades: PK–12
- Schools: 1
- NCES District ID: 4844310

Students and staff
- Students: 297 (2023–2024)
- Teachers: 27.86 (on an FTE basis)
- Student–teacher ratio: 10.66:1
- District mascot: Wildcat
- Colors: Blue & white

Other information
- Website: www.waelderisd.org

Waelder Independent School District is a public school district based in Waelder, Texas, United States.

Located in Gonzales County, the district extends into a small portion of Caldwell County.

In 2009, the school district was rated "academically acceptable" by the Texas Education Agency.

== Administration ==
Superintendent: Dr. Ron Lilie (as of 2026)

== Buildings ==
Waelder Elementary School (built in 1967)
Waelder Junior High School (built in 1967)
Waelder High School (2009)
Waelder ISD Cafeteria
Ralphe Bunche Gym (in stasis)

All three of the main school buildings and the cafeteria are located just off of Highway 90 and comprise one city block. As of 2006, there are about 250 students enrolled in grades K-12, and the district employs 43 people (professional and paraprofessional).

On May 12, 2007, voters approved a $3.8 million bond referendum that would be used to build a new high school and a new gymnasium, while also funding much needed renovations for the elementary school, junior high school, and cafeteria. Many Waelder residents saw the passing of the bond in 2007 as a historic moment, since the school district had not had a bond election in 40 years, and the previous two bonds were more or less the result of federal laws. $120,000 were passed in 1957 to build the Ralph Bunche School for African-Americans due to segregation, and $329,000 were passed in 1967 to build a new junior high and elementary school due to integration.

The game between Waelder and Prairie Lea on February 5, 2008 marked the final time a WISD basketball team would take the court at Ralph Bunche Gym. At the conclusion of the boys basketball game, there was a ceremony held to commemorate 50 years of memories on the hardwood. Current and former players, along with other alumni, also participated in a net-cutting ceremony.

== Sports & District Alignments (2007-2008) ==
Basketball (Conference 1A - Division II - Region 4 - District 31)
Volleyball (Conference 1A - Division I - Region 4 - District 27)
Tennis (Conference 1A - Division I - Region 4 - District 27)
Track & Field (Conference 1A - Division I - Region 4 - District 27)
Cross Country (Conference 1A - Division I - Region 4 - District 27)
Golf (Conference 1A - Division I - Region 4 - District 27)

During the 2010-2011 basketball season, the varsity boys basketball team made it to the state tournament located in Austin, Texas at the Frank Erwin Center. The team lost to Paducah in the State semi-finals 67-31.
