= George Washington Memorial Highway =

Memorial highway in Massachusetts

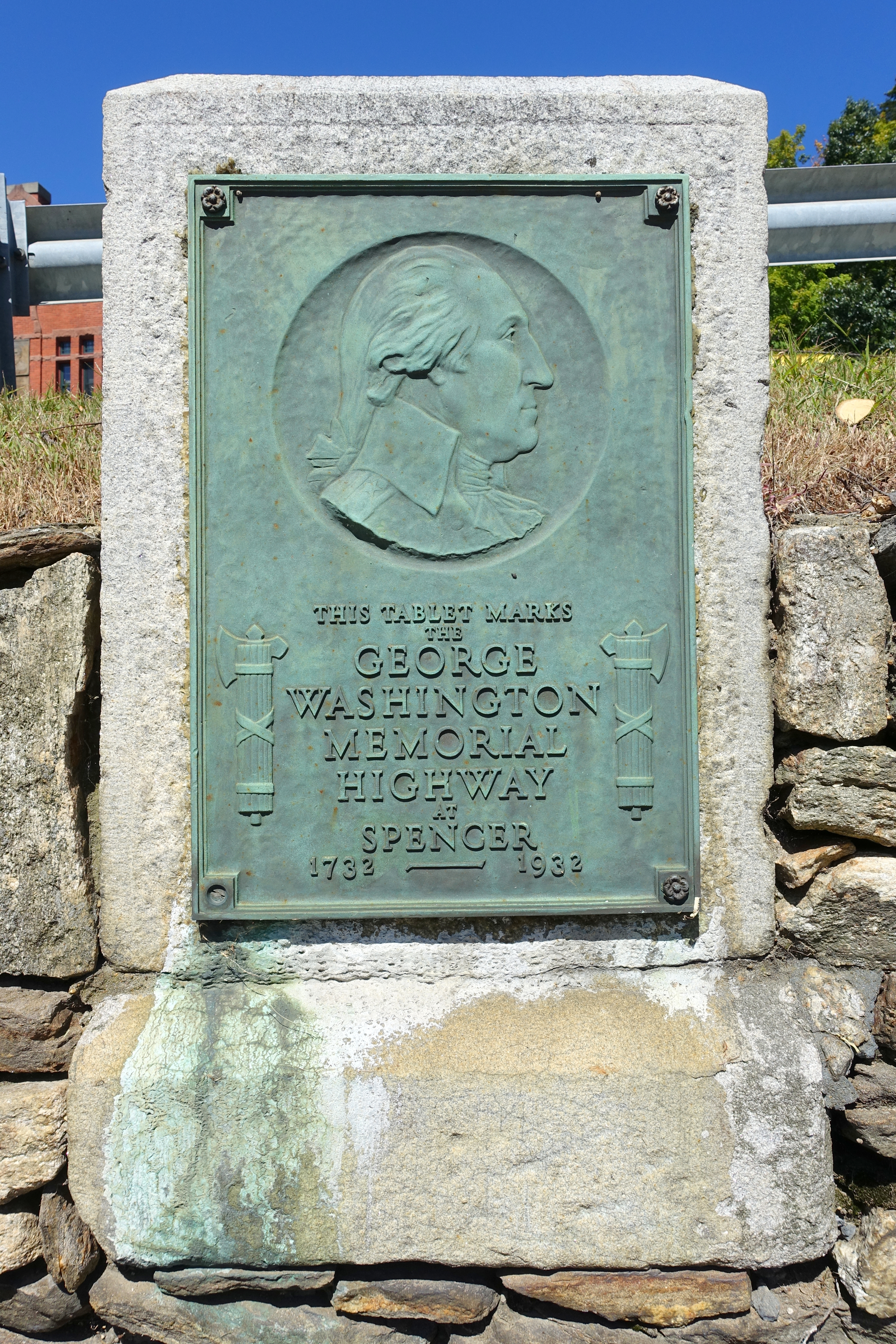
George Washington Memorial Highway plaque, Spencer, Massachusetts

The George Washington Memorial Highway, sometimes called the George Washington Highway or the George Washington Bicentennial Highway, is an auto trail in Massachusetts that commemorates the route taken by George Washington when he traveled through the state.

The highway apparently stems from a 1913 proposal from the Sons of the American Revolution for a route through the 13 original colonies, to be named the George Washington Highway. It was revived in the United States Senate with Senate Bill 4204, by Charles W. Waterman of Colorado, in March 1932, as documented in the Congressional Record, and proposed in the United States House of Representatives by Congressman William R. Eaton of Colorado in H.R. 9596, who called from the creation of the George Washington Bicentennial Highway as a transcontinental highway, running from Boston through Washington, D.C., and across the nation to San Francisco. It would run along existing roads, much like the earlier Lincoln Highway. In hearings, however, this proposal was rejected as being too confusing and too costly.

Nonetheless, as documented in these hearings, the states of Connecticut and Massachusetts had already agreed to establish the George Washington Highway from New York City to Boston. It followed the route that Washington traveled twice: when taking command of the Continental Army, and later in the fall of 1789 after he became president. Although the Connecticut portion of that highway apparently did not materialize, the Massachusetts segment did. As reported in the Worcester Telegram, the highway was marked with 22 plaques along the route between Agawam and Cambridge. Some number of these markers still exist.
