= Texas State Highway 33 =

State highway in Texas

State Highway 33

Route information
- Maintained by TxDOT
- Length: 22.7 mi (36.5 km)
- Existed: October 26, 1954–present

Major junctions
- West end: US 60 / US 83 south of Canadian
- East end: SH-33 near Durham, OK

Location
- Country: United States
- State: Texas

Highway system
- Highways in Texas; Interstate; US; State; Former; Toll; Loops; Spurs; FM/RM; Park; Rec
← SH 32	→ SH 34

State Highway 33 is a route that runs from U.S. Highways 60 and 83 south of Canadian and travels east to the Oklahoma state line, where it becomes State Highway 33.

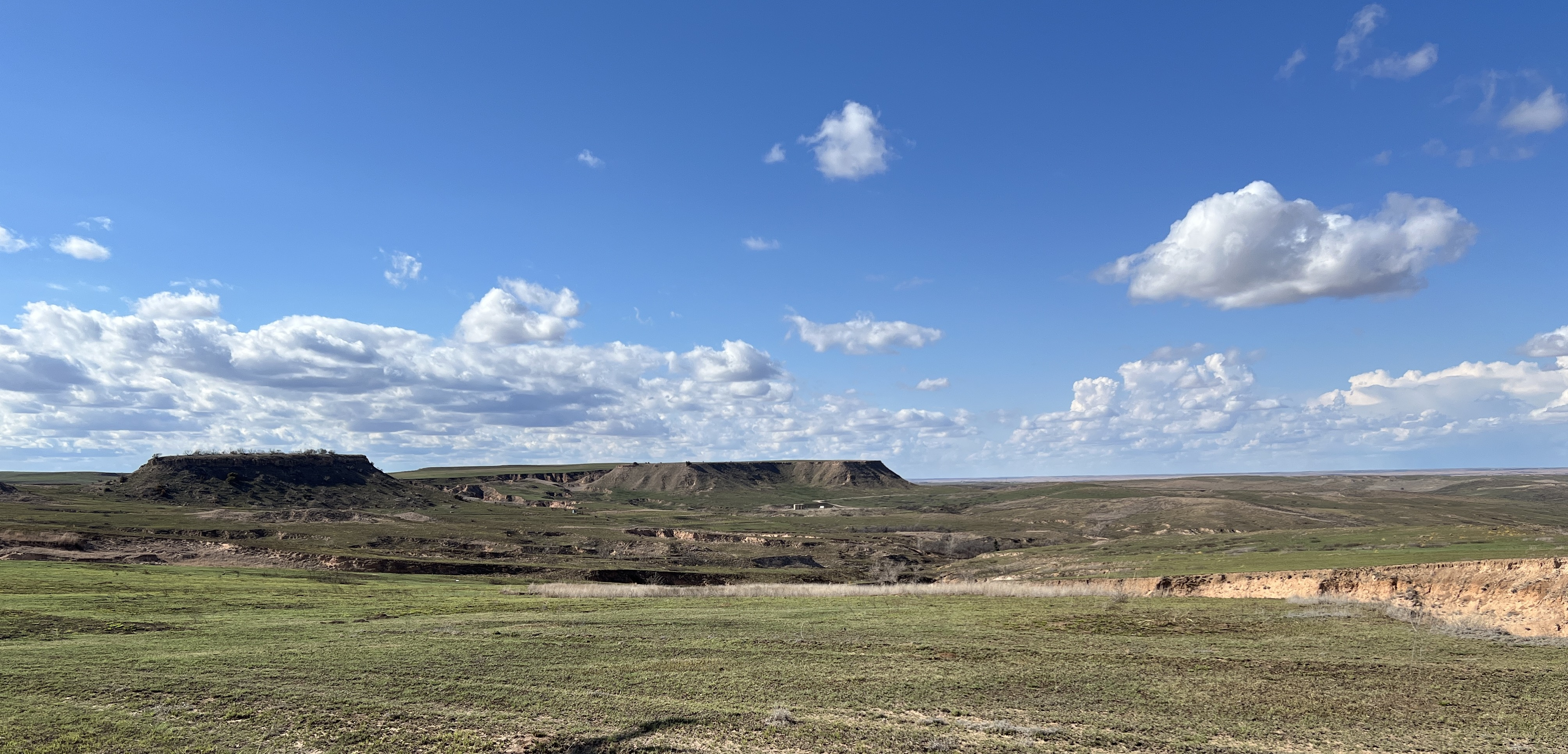
Canadian River Valley north of Texas State Highway 33

== Previous routes ==
Historic SH 33

SH 33 was originally proposed on November 19, 1917, from El Paso to the New Mexico state line. On December 18, 1917, an intercounty highway was designated from Amarillo to Higgins. On September 5, 1918, SH 33 was extended southwest to the Mexico border. On October 21, 1918, another intercounty highway was designated from Farwell to Canyon. On March 19, 1919, another section of SH 33 was added from the New Mexico state line through Amarillo northeast through Panhandle then east through Wheeler and into Oklahoma, replacing the intercounty highway from Farwell to Canyon and the section of the intercounty highway from Amarillo to Pampa. This section was proposed as SH 13 until November 19, 1917, when SH 13 was rerouted off of this proposed road. On November 27, 1922, SH 33 was rerouted over SH 33A so that it went northeast from Pampa to the Oklahoma state line near Higgins. The section from Pampa via Wheeler to the Oklahoma state line was cancelled. In 1926, it was cosigned with US 366 southwest of Amarillo. By 1928, it was cosigned with US 164 northeast of Amarillo. By 1933, it was still under construction. Both US 366 and US 164 became part of an extended US 60. On November 24, 1936, SH 33 Loop was designated in Bovina. On September 26, 1939, SH 33 had been cancelled, as the entire northern section was part of US 60 and the southern section was part of US 54. SH 33 Loop was renumbered as Loop 47. SH 33 was reassigned on October 26, 1954, when SH 170 was renumbered as SH 33 to match Oklahoma.

Historic SH 33A

SH 33A was originally a spur route of SH 33, splitting off in Pampa, and travelling northeast next to the a rail route. It was designated as an intercounty highway west of Higgins on December 18, 1917, and the intercounty highway was extended east to the Oklahoma state line on September 5, 1919, but was changed to a state highway, SH 33A, on January 17, 1921. On November 27, 1922, it had been renumbered as the main route. On February 17, 1925, it had been moved to a new route from Pampa via Wheeler to the Oklahoma state line. On September 21, 1925, the section from Wheeler to Oklahoma was cancelled. On August 1, 1929, it had been moved to a new route from Miami to Mobeetie. On February 26, 1930, it was rerouted to go west to Pampa instead of Miami, and it was extended east to Wheeler. On March 19, 1930, it was renumbered as SH 152.

Historic SH 33B

SH 33B was a proposed route from Clarendon north through Pampa, and continuing north into Oklahoma. It was designated as an intercounty highway on June 21, 1920, but was changed to a state highway, SH 33B, on January 17, 1921. The route was cancelled on November 27, 1922. On February 19, 1923, it was restored, but only from Pampa to Oklahoma. On August 21, 1923, the route had been renumbered as SH 88 (now SH 70), which was re-extended to Clarendon.

== Junction list ==
The entire route is in Hemphill County.

Location	mi	km	Destinations	Notes
			US 60 / US 83 – Canadian	Western terminus
			RM 2654	
			SH-33 – Roll	Continuation into Oklahoma
1.000 mi = 1.609 km; 1.000 km = 0.621 mi
