= Texas Park Road 12 =

Highway in Texas, United States

PR 12
- PR 12 highlighted in red

Route information
- Maintained by TxDOT
- Length: 0.275 mi (443 m)
- Existed: September 26, 1939–present

Major junctions
- South end: FM 1155 in Washington-on-the-Brazos
- North end: Park road in Washington-on-the-Brazos State Historic Site

Location
- Country: United States
- State: Texas
- Counties: Washington

Highway system
- Highways in Texas; Interstate; US; State; Former; Toll; Loops; Spurs; FM/RM; Park; Rec
← RM 12	→ SH 13

Park Road 12 (PR 12) is a short Park Road located in Washington County, in the Gulf Coast region of the U.S. state of Texas. The highway is approximately 0.3 miles (0.48 km) long, and connects Washington-on-the-Brazos State Historic Site to Farm to Market Road 1155 (FM 1155) and the surrounding community of Washington-on-the-Brazos. The highway was designated in 1939, and was shortened in 1970. The designation originally contained all roads within the park.

== Route description ==
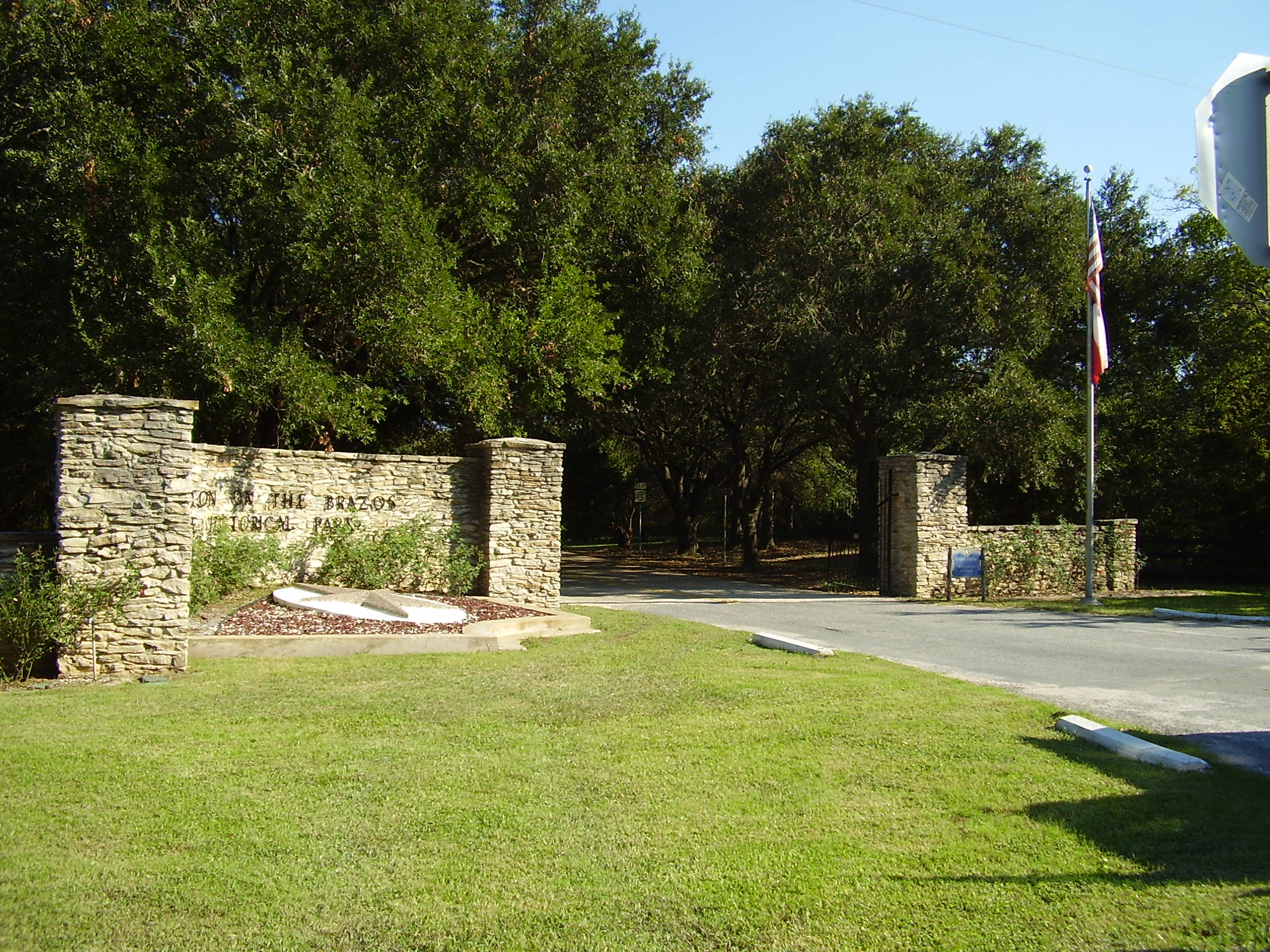
The entrance to Washington-on-the-Brazos State Historic Site, with PR 12 passing through the center of the image

PR 12 begins at an at-grade intersection with FM 1155 just outside the border of the State Historic Site. The highway begins as a two-lane, paved road. The road proceeds eastward for a short distance before bending northeastward. The roadway continues northeast through dense trees before reaching its northern terminus, an at-grade intersection with a small park road.

== History ==
Park Road 12 was first designated on September 26, 1939, as a redesignation of State Highway 229. The highway began at State Highway 90, and included all drives in Old Washington State Park, as the park was known at that time. On February 5, 1954, SH 90 was rerouted off of the road on the north end of PR 12, and the old route of SH 90 that intersected PR 12 was redesignated as FM 912 (SH 105 replaced this section of SH 90 on February 28, 1973). On March 5, 1963, FM 1155 was extended north replacing the section of FM 912 at the north end of PR 12, meaning the north end was at FM 1155. On October 2, 1970, a 0.6 miles (0.97 km) section was removed because it had been incorporated into the park.

== Major junctions ==
The entire road is in Washington County.

Location	mi	km	Destinations	Notes
Washington-on-the-Brazos	0.000	0.000	FM 1155 – Navasota	Southern terminus
Washington-on-the-Brazos State Historical Site	0.275	0.443	Park road	Northern terminus
1.000 mi = 1.609 km; 1.000 km = 0.621 mi
