= Texas State Highway 251 =

State highway in Texas

State Highway 251
- SH 251, highlighted in red

Route information
- Maintained by TxDOT
- Length: 13.497 mi (21.721 km)
- Existed: 1937–present

Major junctions
- South end: FM 926 in Newcastle
- North end: SH 79 in Olney

Location
- Country: United States
- State: Texas

Highway system
- Highways in Texas; Interstate; US; State; Former; Toll; Loops; Spurs; FM/RM; Park; Rec
← SH 250	→ SH 252

State Highway 251 (SH 251) is a Texas state highway running between Olney and Newcastle. The route was designated on June 22, 1937 from Newcastle south to Old Fort Belknap, and was extended northward to Olney mainly along its current route on September 26, 1939 when SH 24 was rerouted. The section from Newcastle to the fort was removed on February 23, 1993 and transferred to FM 61. One small section in Newcastle was transferred to FM 926

== Junction list ==
The entire route is in Young County.

Location	mi	km	Destinations	Notes
Newcastle			FM 926	
			FM 3329	
Olney			SH 79	
1.000 mi = 1.609 km; 1.000 km = 0.621 mi
