= Texas State Highway 354 =

State highway in Texas

State Highway 354
- SH 354, highlighted in red

Route information
- Maintained by TxDOT
- Length: 21.354 mi (34.366 km)
- Existed: 1944–present

Major junctions
- West end: US 385 in Channing
- East end: US 87 / US 287

Location
- Country: United States
- State: Texas

Highway system
- Highways in Texas; Interstate; US; State; Former; Toll; Loops; Spurs; FM/RM; Park; Rec
← SH 353	→ SH 355

State Highway 354 (SH 354) is a state highway in the Texas Panhandle. This route is a replacement of a portion of SH 5, which was cancelled on September 14, 1944 as it was never built. This section was bypassed, and was renumbered to keep state highway status.

== Route description ==
SH 354 begins at an intersection with US 385 in the town of Channing. The highway is known as 7th Street in Channing and the road extends to the west of the US 385 intersection as FM 767. SH 354 heads to the east from this intersection through Hartley County. It passes over into Moore County before an intersection with FM 2202. The highway continues east to its eastern terminus at an intersection with a concurrent US 87 and US 287. The road continues east past this intersection as FM 1913.

== Major intersections ==
County	Location	mi	km	Destinations	Notes
Hartley	Channing			US 385 – Vega, Dalhart	Western terminus; continues as FM 767
Moore				FM 2202	
Moore				US 87 / US 287 – Amarillo, Dumas	Eastern terminus; continues as FM 1913
1.000 mi = 1.609 km; 1.000 km = 0.621 mi
