= Waelder, Texas =

- city
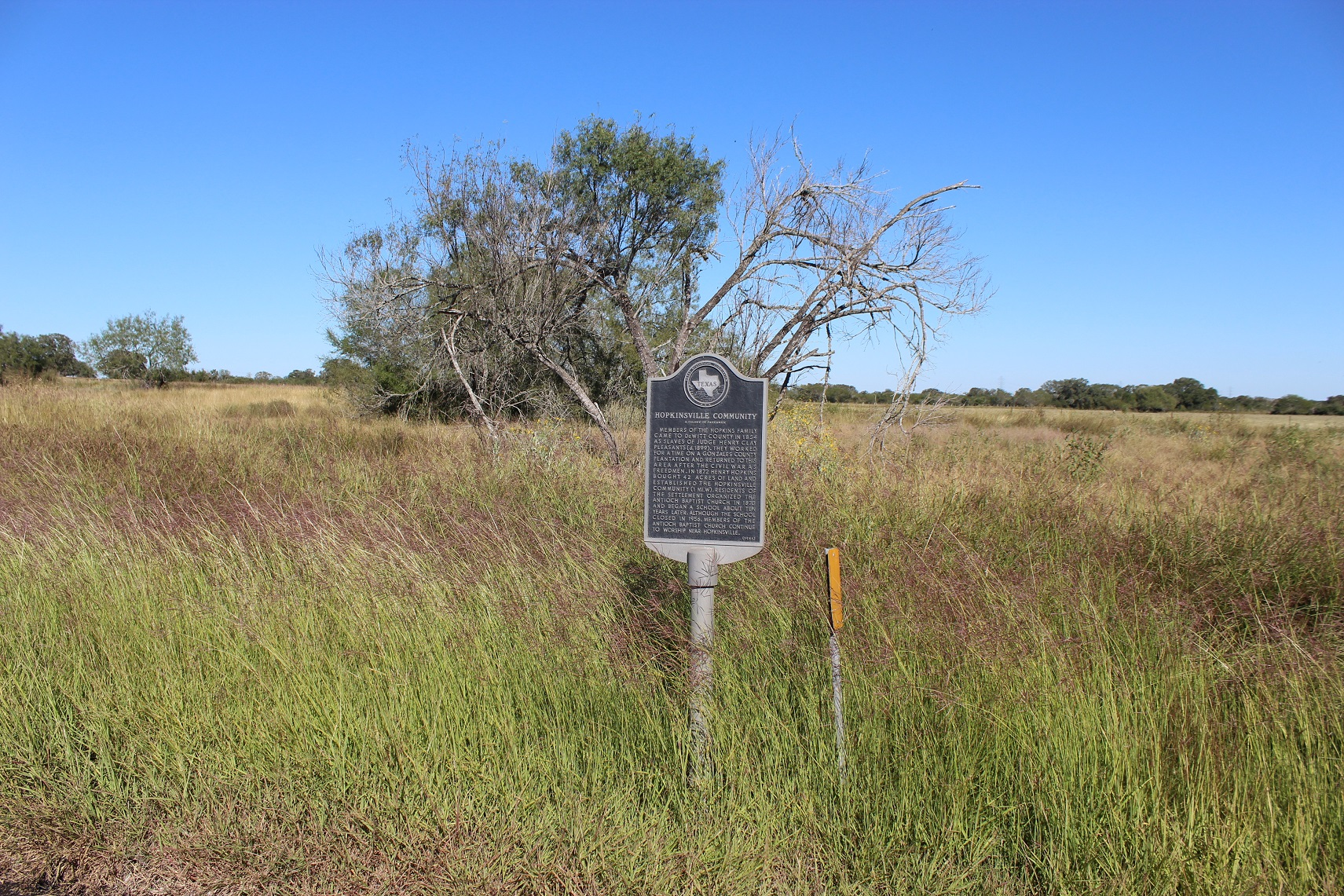
- Site of a former community in Waelder

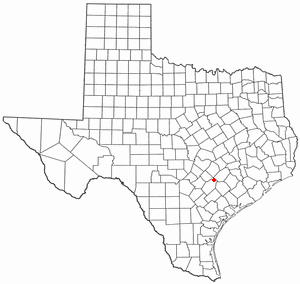
- Location of Waelder, Texas

- Coordinates: 29°41′40″N 97°17′50″W
- Country: United States
- State: Texas
- County: Gonzales

Area
  - Total: 1.29 sq mi (3.33 km^{2})
  - Land: 1.28 sq mi (3.31 km^{2})
  - Water: 0.0077 sq mi (0.02 km^{2})
- Elevation: 390 ft (120 m)

Population (2020)
  - Total: 933
  - Density: 885.9/sq mi (342.04/km^{2})
- Time zone: UTC-6 (Central (CST))
  - Summer (DST): UTC-5 (CDT)
- ZIP code: 78959
- Area code: 830
- FIPS code: 48-76024
- GNIS feature ID: 2412163
- Website: www.cityofwaelder.org

Waelder (/ˈwɛldər/ WEL-dər) is a city in Gonzales County, Texas, United States and is also part of the Texas-German belt. The population was 933 at the 2020 census.

== Geography ==
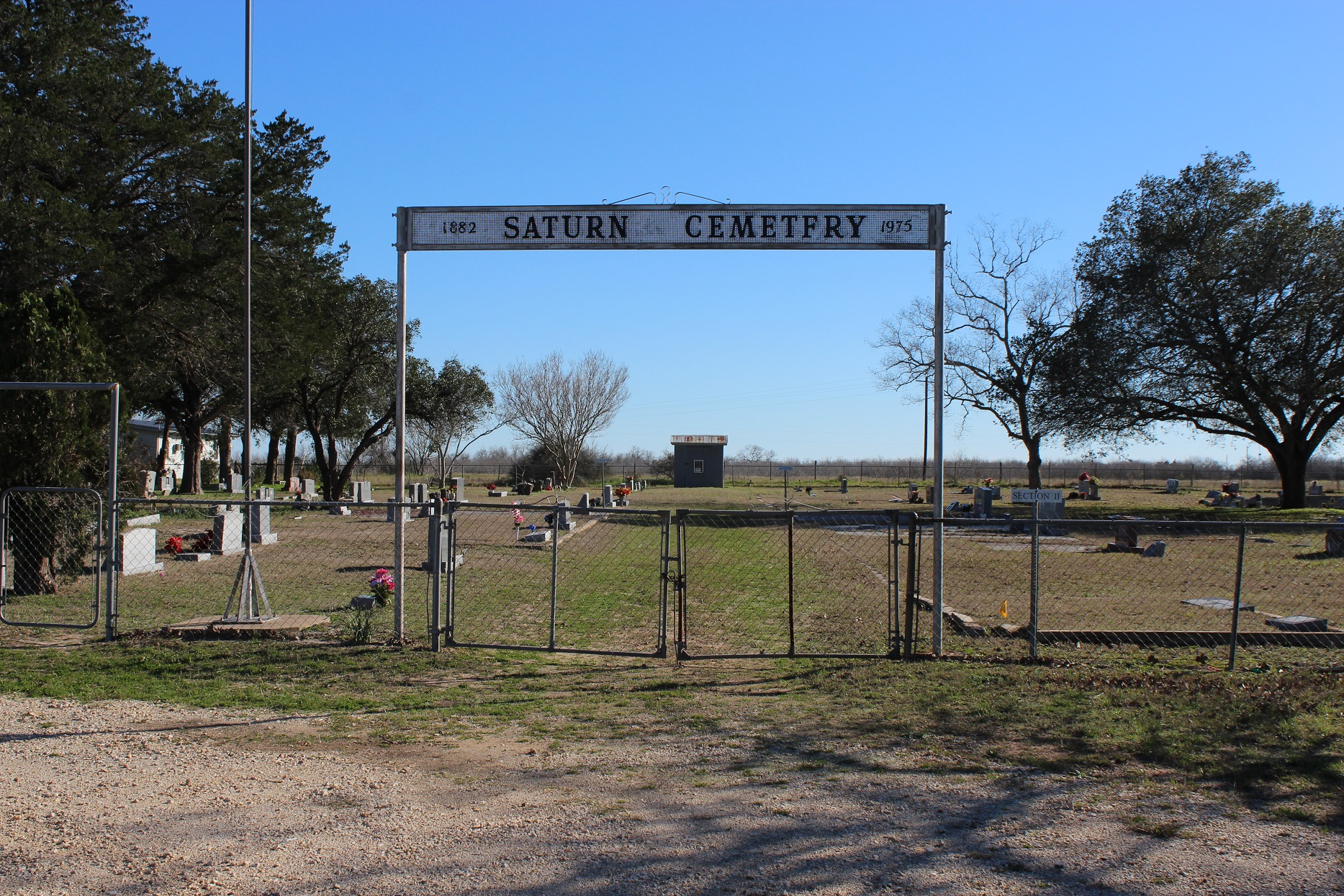
A cemetery near town

According to the United States Census Bureau, the town has a total area of 1.3 square miles (3.4 km^{2}), of which 1.3 square miles (3.4 km^{2}) is land and 0.78% is water.

=== Climate ===
The climate in this area is characterized by hot, humid summers and generally mild to cool winters. According to the Köppen Climate Classification system, Waelder has a humid subtropical climate, abbreviated "Cfa" on climate maps.

== Demographics ==
Historical population
Census	Pop.	Note	%±
1890	388		—
1920	894		—
1930	1,048		17.2%
1940	1,018		−2.9%
1950	1,275		25.2%
1960	1,270		−0.4%
1970	1,138		−10.4%
1980	942		−17.2%
1990	745		−20.9%
2000	947		27.1%
2010	1,065		12.5%
2020	933		−12.4%
U.S. Decennial Census

=== 2020 census ===
As of the 2020 census, Waelder had a population of 933, 336 households, and 290 families residing in the city. The median age was 36.7 years, 27.2% of residents were under age 18, and 15.9% were 65 years of age or older; for every 100 females there were 106.4 males, and for every 100 females age 18 and over there were 106.4 males age 18 and over.

0.0% of residents lived in urban areas, while 100.0% lived in rural areas.

There were 336 households in Waelder, of which 33.9% had children under 18 living in them. Of all households, 33.0% were married-couple households, 27.7% were households with a male householder and no spouse or partner present, and 30.1% were households with a female householder and no spouse or partner present. About 25.3% of all households were made up of individuals and 8.1% had someone living alone who was 65 years of age or older.

There were 413 housing units, of which 18.6% were vacant. The homeowner vacancy rate was 1.5% and the rental vacancy rate was 13.4%.

Racial composition as of the 2020 census
Race	Number	Percent
White	202	21.7%
Black or African American	126	13.5%
American Indian and Alaska Native	8	0.9%
Asian	0	0.0%
Native Hawaiian and Other Pacific Islander	0	0.0%
Some other race	454	48.7%
Two or more races	143	15.3%
Hispanic or Latino (of any race)	680	72.9%

=== 2010 census ===
As of the census of 2010, there were 1065 people, 362 households, and 255 families residing in the city. The population density was 819.2 inhabitants per square mile (316.3/km^{2}). There were 443 housing units at an average density of 322.9/mi^{2} (124.6/km^{2}). The racial makeup of the city was 50.2% White, 13.3% African American, 1.2% Native American, 33.2% from other races, and 2.0% from two or more races. Hispanic or Latino of any race were 77.6% of the population.

There were 362 households, out of which 30.4% had children under the age of 18 living with them, 41.4% were married couples living together, 19.1% had a female householder with no husband present, and 29.6% were non-families. 22.7% of all households were made up of individuals living alone, and 8.9% were made up of individuals 65 years of age or older living alone. The average household size was 2.94 and the average family size was 3.4.

In the town, the population was spread out, with 26.9% under the age of 18, 11.8% from 18 to 24, 32.5% from 25 to 49, 19.4% from 50 to 64, and 9.4% who were 65 years of age or older. The median age was 33.9 years. For every 100 females, there were 110.5 males. For every 100 females age 18 and over, there were 120.1 males.

The median income for a household in the Waelder was $24,152, and the median income for a family was $39,792. Its per capita income was $11,417. Full-time, year-round working males had a median income of $28,487 versus $15,969 for full-time, year-round working females. About 13.4% of families and 23.7% of the population were below the poverty line, including 25.2% of those under age 18 and 36.9% of those age 65 or over.

== Business ==
Waelder is home to the J Bar B Foods factory, where meat products are produced and shipped to local stores. Waelder was recently featured in a "My H-E-B" commercial.

== Schools ==
See Waelder Independent School District.

== Media ==
Two newspapers, The Gonzales Inquirer and The Gonzales Cannon, provide local news coverage for Waelder.
