= Texas State Highway 13 =

Former highway in Texas

State Highway 13

Route information
- Maintained by TxDOT
- Existed: April 4, 1917–September 26, 1939
- History: Replaced by US 66 in 1939

Major junctions
- West end: near current US 60 at Farwell
- East end: near current SH 152 east of Wheeler

Location
- Country: United States
- State: Texas

Highway system
- Highways in Texas; Interstate; US; State; Former; Toll; Loops; Spurs; FM/RM; Park; Rec
← PR 12	→ Loop 13

State Highway 13 (SH 13) was a state highway in the U.S. state of Texas that ran from Amarillo due west to the New Mexico state line near Glenrio, Texas.

SH 13 was one of the original 25 state highways proposed on June 21, 1917, overlaid on top of the Ozark Trail. From 1917 the routing mostly followed present-day US 60 from Farwell through Amarillo to Pampa. From there, the highway turned east on present-day SH 152 to the border near Wheeler.

On October 8, 1917, SH 13 was completely reassigned to the route due east from New Mexico through Amarillo, Hedley, and Wellington to the Oklahoma state line.

On February 17, 1919, an inter-county highway was designated from Amarillo east to the Oklahoma state line. On August 21, 1922, this was redesignated as part of SH 13. On November 27, 1922, this was redesignated as SH 13A, and the west end was rerouted to end at Goodnight. On August 21, 1923, this route was renumbered as SH 75. The end was rerouted back to Amarillo on March 17, 1924.

On August 21, 1923, SH 13 had been pulled back to its Amarillo-Endee segment, while the road east of Amarillo was renumbered as SH 52 (now SH 203). In 1926, US 66 was overlaid on the entire SH 13 route west of Amarillo. On September 26, 1939, SH 13 was canceled, and has never been reassigned.
