= Texas State Highway 40 =

State highway in Texas

State Highway 40
- William D Fitch Pkwy
- SH 40 highlighted in red

Route information
- Maintained by TxDOT
- Length: 3.0 mi (4.8 km)
- Existed: 1994–present

Major junctions
- West end: FM 2154 at College Station
- East end: SH 6 at College Station

Location
- Country: United States
- State: Texas
- County: Brazos

Highway system
- Highways in Texas; Interstate; US; State; Former; Toll; Loops; Spurs; FM/RM; Park; Rec
← I-40	→ SH 41

State Highway 40 (SH 40) or William D. Fitch Parkway, runs from Farm to Market Road 2154 (FM 2154) to SH 6 in College Station, Texas. The current SH 40 was authorized in 1994. Signage for the highway went up March 2006 and the road was officially opened June 23, 2006.

SH 40 occupies the overpass and intersection with SH 6 that was formerly Greens Prairie Road, which was truncated and connected to SH 40 by Arrington Road West of SH 6. Greens Prairie Road and SH 40 were renamed in honor of William D. Fitch in August 2006. At SH 6, SH 40 terminates and becomes a local road (maintaining the Fitch Parkway name) continuing northeast to SH 30.

== Route description ==
SH 40 begins at an intersection with FM 2154 (Wellborn Road) in College Station, Brazos County, heading southeast on William D. Fitch Parkway, a four-lane undivided road. The road heads near residential subdivisions, becoming a divided highway with the median widening to include woodland. The highway heads through more wooded areas with some fields and residential neighborhoods, turning to the east. SH 40 turns to the northeast and the median narrows, with the road becoming undivided again as it comes to its eastern terminus at an interchange with SH 6.

== History ==
Historic SH 40

A previous highway, also called SH 40, existed from March 17, 1919 until September 26, 1939, and ran from the Oklahoma state line north of Gainesville down through Denton, Dallas and Beaumont before ending in Sabine Pass. On March 18, 1919, a spur route, SH 40A that went from Denton and ended in Fort Worth was designated, so SH 40A and the route of SH 40 north of Dallas replaced SH 16. On August 21, 1923, this spur had become an extension of SH 10. That same day, SH 40 was truncated to Voth (north of Beaumont), with the section from Voth to Beaumont already part of SH 8 and the section from Beaumont to Sabine Pass cancelled. SH 40 was rerouted over a portion of SH 37 between Rusk and southeast of Lufkin, while the old route was either cancelled or transferred to SH 37. On May 22, 1933, SH 40 Spur was created to Baxter. On January 24, 1938, SH 40 Loop was designated to Keltys. On April 19, 1938, SH 40 Bypass was designated from SH 40 to SH 114. On June 21, 1938, SH 40 Spur was designated to Forest.

The Gainesville to Dallas portion became US 77 in 1929. In 1932, the Dallas to Jacksonville stretch had become part of US 175. The last remaining portion of old SH 40, Jacksonville to Port Arthur, became part of US 69 in 1934. On September 26, 1939, SH 40 was cancelled in favor of these US Highways. The SH 40 Loop and SH 40 Spur routes were renumbered as Loop 12 (Dallas), Spur 29 (Forest), Loop 36 (Keltys), and Spur 65 (Baxter).

SH 40A was a spur route proposed on September 16, 1926, going from St. Augustine south to Zavalla. This route was actually designated as SH 8B instead(now SH 147).

Interstates 35E and 35W roughly follow the old SH 40 routes from Dallas and Fort Worth, respectively, to Denton, and the old route from Denton north is approximated by Interstate 35.

== Major intersections ==
The entire route is in College Station, Brazos County.

mi	km	Destinations	Notes
0.000	0.000	FM 2154 (Wellborn Road)	
3.011	4.846	SH 6 (Earl Rudder Freeway) – College Station, Navasota	Interchange
1.000 mi = 1.609 km; 1.000 km = 0.621 mi
