= U.S. Route 32 =

U.S. Route 32

Route information
- Length: 511 mi (822 km)
- Existed: 1926–1934

Location
- Country: United States
- States: Nebraska, (Note: Before 1931) Iowa, Illinois

Highway system
- United States Numbered Highway System; List; Special; Divided
← US 31	→ US 33

U.S. Route 32 (US 32) was a U.S. Highway from 1926 to 1934, which ran along present-day:

- U.S. Route 6 from Omaha, Nebraska to Princeton, Illinois
- U.S. Route 34 from Princeton, Illinois to Chicago, Illinois
