= Texas State Highway 4 =

Highway in Texas

State Highway 4
- SH 4 highlighted in red

Route information
- Maintained by TxDOT
- Length: 24.4 mi (39.3 km)
- Existed: April 4, 1917–present

Major junctions
- West end: Fed. 101 / Fed. 180 at the Mexican border in Brownsville
- I-69E / US 77 / US 83 in Brownsville; SH 48 in Brownsville
- East end: Boca Chica Beach in Starbase

Location
- Country: United States
- State: Texas

Highway system
- Highways in Texas; Interstate; US; State; Former; Toll; Loops; Spurs; FM/RM; Park; Rec
← RE 3	→ Loop 4

State Highway 4 (SH 4), known locally as Boca Chica Boulevard, is an east–west state highway in the U.S. state of Texas that runs from the Gateway International Bridge in Brownsville to Boca Chica Beach in Starbase. Outside of Brownsville, it roughly parallels the Rio Grande. It is the southernmost Texas state highway.

== History ==

SH 4 was one of the original twenty-five state highways proposed on June 21, 1917, overlaid on top of the Del Rio – Canadian Highway. From 1917 the routing mostly followed present-day U.S. Highway 83 from Perryton, Childress, to Aspermont. From there, it followed present-day FM 610 and SH 70 to Blackwell. It then continued down present-day U.S. Highway 277 into San Angelo and Sonora and Del Rio. On February 7, 1919, SH 4 was rerouted to end at Uvalde, and the old route from Sonora to Del Rio was cancelled. On April 22, 1919, the branch to Del Rio was restored. The road at this time also had numerous alternate routes simultaneously marked as SH 4, along with occasionally signed SH 4A routes (although most of those routes were given their own numbers by the 1930s).

On August 21, 1923, the eastern branch from Sonora to Uvalde was cancelled. The section of SH 4 from Childress to Aspermont was cancelled, The section from Aspermont to San Angelo was renumbered as SH 70, and the section south of San Angelo became part of SH 30. On September 9, 1927, SH 4 was extended through Aspermont to Hamlin, was concurrent with SH 92 from Hamlin to Stamford, SH 30 from Stamford to Abilene, and SH 7 from Abilene to Santa Anna, and took over SH 107 from Santa Anna to Brady. On December 6, 1927, SH 4 was rerouted on new construction from Hamlin to Anson, eliminating the concurrency with SH 92 and part of the concurrency with SH 30. On August 6, 1929 (not official until September 1, 1929), U.S. Highway 83 was extended into Texas, and SH 4 was rerouted to match US 83, following SH 30 to Ballinger, Texas, replacing SH 23 to Junction, new construction to Uvalde, replacing SH 55 to Catarina, new construction (cancelling the portion of SH 55 from Catarina to Artesia Wells; this would be restored as SH 189 on November 30, 1932) to Laredo, replacing SH 12B to Pharr, and replaced part of the now severely reworked SH 12 to Brownsville. The old route from Brady to Santa Anna was changed back to SH 107. On November 30, 1932, SH 4 was rerouted through Hidalgo. On January 19, 1935, this route was swapped with SH 48. On February 11, 1935, SH 4 was extended to Boca Chica. The section from Junction to Leakey was cancelled on July 15, 1935, but was restored on November 5, 1937. On September 26, 1939, the route was turned over to U.S. Route 83, with the only remaining portion of SH 4 being the current routing from Brownsville eastward, now known as the Boca Chica Highway. On May 29, 1997, SH 4 was extended southwest over the old route of US 77 and US 83 to the Gateway International Bridge.

== Route description ==
SH 4 begins at the Gateway International Bridge in downtown Brownsville, travelling northeast on International Boulevard. A mile later, it reaches I-69E/US 77/83. This first one-mile (1.6 km) section was previously the final stretch of US 77 and 83 before they were rerouted to the southeast around downtown to the Veteran's International Bridge. SH 4 continues northeast, passing the intersection with Farm to Market Road 1418, until it reaches an intersection with SH 48 at Boca Chica Boulevard. SH 4 turns east onto Boca Chica Boulevard. About a mile to the east is the cutoff for Farm to Market Road 2519, which leads to the Brownsville/South Padre Island International Airport. SH 4 continues east, passing along the north side of the airport grounds and meeting intersections with Farm to Market Roads 313 and 511. SH 4 exits Brownsville continuing east near the southern side of the Port of Brownsville. This section passes a few historical landmarks, including the site of the Battle of Palmito Ranch, site of the final battle of the American Civil War. The highway continues east-northeast, past Starbase and SpaceX South Texas Launch Site, until it terminates at Boca Chica Beach and Brazos Island State Park on the Gulf of Mexico.

== Major intersections ==
The entire route is in Cameron County.

Location	mi	km	Destinations	Notes
Brownsville	0.0	0.0	Fed. 101 / Fed. 180 at the Gateway International Bridge	Mexican border (Rio Grande)
Brownsville	0.1	0.16	Elizabeth Street – Fort Brown	
Brownsville	0.1	0.16	Bus. US 77 north (Washington Street) – Downtown Brownsville	
Brownsville	0.9	1.4	I-69E / US 77 / US 83 – Harlingen, Veterans Intl Bridge, UT–RGV, TX Southmost College	I-69E exit 1A
Brownsville	1.7	2.7	FM 1419 east (Southmost Boulevard)	
Brownsville	2.5	4.0	SH 48 (Padre Island Highway / Boca Chica Boulevard) – Port of Brownsville, South Padre Island	
Brownsville	3.2	5.1	FM 2519 south (Billy Mitchell Boulevard) – International Airport	
Brownsville	4.8	7.7	FM 313 north (Minnesota Avenue)	
Brownsville	6.3	10.1	FM 511 (Indiana Avenue) – Port Brownsville	
	7.9	12.7	FM 1419 west	
Starbase	24.4	39.3	Boca Chica Beach	
1.000 mi = 1.609 km; 1.000 km = 0.621 mi
