= Texas State Highway 9 =

Highway and former highway in Texas

State Highway 9

Route information
- Maintained by TxDOT
- Length: 3.126 mi (5.031 km)
- Existed: September 25, 2008–present

Major junctions
- West end: FM 116 near Copperas Cove
- East end: I-14 / US 190 / Bus. US 190 near Copperas Cove

Location
- Country: United States
- State: Texas
- Counties: Coryell

Highway system
- Highways in Texas; Interstate; US; State; Former; Toll; Loops; Spurs; FM/RM; Park; Rec
← RE 8	→ Loop 9

State Highway 9 (SH 9) is a highway near Copperas Cove, Texas. It connects Interstate 14 (I-14), U.S. Route 190 (US 190), and U.S. Highway 190 Business (Bus. US 190) outside of Copperas Cove to Farm to Market Road 116 (FM 116) on the north side of Copperas Cove. The highway opened on February 20, 2014 with a ribbon cutting at 2:00 p.m.

== Route description ==
The entire current route of SH 9 is a two-lane expressway sandwiched between the city of Copperas Cove and Fort Cavazos. It is three miles (4.8 km) and is entirely in Coryell County. SH 9 begins at an intersection with FM 116 (which is briefly a four-lane highway with a wide median) north of downtown Copperas Cove. It travels east entering the border of Fort Cavazos first crossing over Old Georgetown Road, then under Tank Destroyer Boulevard. Tank Destroyer Boulevard has a partial interchange with SH 9 allowing eastbound traffic to exit towards the base while traffic exiting the base may enter to the westbound lane. After passing over a railroad, SH 9 ends at a partial interchange with Bus. US 190 east of the city. The only movements allowed at the interchange are eastbound SH 9 to eastbound Bus. US 190 and vice versa. This interchange is within the same complex where Bus. US 190 has its eastern terminus at an interchange with Interstate 14 and US 190.

== History ==
Historic SH 9

State Highway 9 (SH 9) was one of the original 25 Texas highways proposed on June 21, 1917, overlaid on top of the Puget Sound-Gulf Highway. In 1919 the routing follows the present day U.S. Highway 87 from Amarillo, through Canyon, Plainview, Lubbock, Big Spring, San Angelo, Brady, Mason, Fredericksburg, into San Antonio. From San Antonio, it follows U.S. Highway 181 from San Antonio, to Sinton and terminated in Corpus Christi.

In 1919 the direct segment between San Angelo and Brady had not yet been built, so SH 9 was rerouted through Paint Rock for a short time (The segment would be completed by 1922). Much like other highways at the time, multiple alternate routings has been created using the same number, and SH 9 was no exception. From San Antonio, the second route left the city south via Pleasanton Road, merging with present-day U.S. Route 281 from Las Gallinas through Pleasanton splitting off onto present day Interstate 37 into Oakville. It continued west on SH 234 into Odem, and south on U.S. Route 77 back to I-37 to its terminus in Corpus Christi. The split date is unknown.

Historic SH 9A

On February 17, 1920, SH 9A was designated on the more direct route from San Angelo to Brady.

Historic SH 9A

On April 18, 1921 a third routing, signed as SH 9A was created alongside the previous two, overrunning the ambitious SH 12 route from Skidmore to Alice, and continuing south to its terminus in Pharr.

On August 21, 1923, the original routing was resigned as SH 16 and had U.S. Route 181 overlaid on top of that. The second routing retained the SH 9 designation, continuing the numbering into Corpus Christi that way. The third routing was given its SH 12 assignment back from Skidmore to Alice and given a new assignment of SH 12 from Alice to Pharr. SH 9 was rerouted over SH 9A from San Angelo to Brady, which was cancelled. The old route through Paint Rock was cancelled (San Angelo to Paint Rock would be restored as SH 268 on May 24, 1938). The south end was truncated to Mathis. On April 21, 1924, SH 9 was to be rerouted from Three Rivers to Alice when right of way is acquired and the bridges were dedicated to the state of Texas. In 1926, U.S. Route 385 (now US 87) was overlaid on the original routing from Amarillo to San Antonio. On December 21, 1926, a split to the Oakville-Mathis Road west of the Nueces River was added. On June 23, 1928, the road was extended to Alice. On April 25, 1929, SH 9 was extended back to Corpus Christi. On March 19, 1930, the road from Three Rivers to Alice was renumbered as SH 145. On December 2, 1931, SH 9 was extended north from Amarillo to Stratford, replacing SH 115. On November 30, 1932, SH 9 was extended north to the Oklahoma state line. On February 8, 1933, SH 9 Loop was designated in Tulia. The section from Amarillo to Oklahoma would eventually be overlaid with U.S. Route 287. On June 11, 1935, a new route through Comfort was created, and the old route is now Old No. 9 Highway. On July 15, 1935, the section of SH 9 from Stratford to Oklahoma was cancelled (as it was not built yet). On September 26, 1935, SH 9 Loop was designated in O'Donnell. On January 21, 1936, SH 9 Spur was designated in Ackerly. On August 1, 1936, the section from Stratford to Oklahoma was restored. On September 26, 1939, most of SH 9 was cancelled, leaving only the Three Rivers-Corpus Christi segment to the old highway. The SH 9 Loop and SH 9 Spur routes became Loop 67 (Ackerly), Loop 76 (O'Donnell), and Loop 77 (Tulia). On April 24, 1958, SH 9 was to be cancelled in Corpus Christi when I-37 was completed in Corpus Christi. On February 26, 1965, SH 9 was truncated to I-37 at Loma Alta Road in Corpus Christi, with the section east of there redesignated as Spur 407 (but was signed as Business SH 9). On May 31, 1971, a minute order said SH 9 will be cancelled with the completion of I-37. When I-37 was completed, SH 9 was cancelled, with the sections that were not replaced by I-37 redesignated as FM 3024 and Spur 459.

== Future ==
TxDOT released a plan to improve the mobility and safety of the FM 116 and SH 9 interchange. A pair of overpasses will be built to enhance both northbound and southbound traffic on FM 116 and a rebuild of the intersection between FM 116 and SH 9, which will include curbs and two new U-turns. Construction began on March 1, 2022 and is expected to be completed in early-2025.

== Junction list ==
The entire route is in Coryell County.

Location	mi	km	Destinations	Notes
	0.0	0.0	FM 116 (North 1st Street) – Gatesville	Current at-grade intersection; interchange under construction
	1.9	3.1	Tank Destroyer Boulevard east	Eastbound exit to Tank Destroyer Boulevard east / westbound Tank Destroyer Boulevard to westbound entrance only
	3.0– 3.3	4.8– 5.3	I-14 east / US 190 east / Bus. US 190 west	Eastbound exit / westbound entrance only; Eastern terminus of Bus. US 190; Western terminus of I-14
1.000 mi = 1.609 km; 1.000 km = 0.621 mi: Incomplete access
