= List of Farm to Market Roads in Texas (1–99) =

- Texas Farm to Market Road and Ranch to Market Road markers

Highway names
- Interstates: Interstate Highway X (IH-X, I-X)
- US Highways: U.S. Highway X (US X)
- State: State Highway X (SH X)
- Loops: Loop X
- Spurs: Spur X
- Recreational: Recreational Road X (RE X)
- Farm or Ranch to Market Roads: Farm to Market Road X (FM X); Ranch to Market Road X (RM X)
- Park Roads: Park Road X (PR X)

System links
- Highways in Texas; Interstate; US; State; Former; Toll; Loops; Spurs; FM/RM; Park; Rec

Farm to Market Roads in Texas are owned and maintained by the Texas Department of Transportation (TxDOT).

== FM 1 ==
Farm to Market Road 1
- Location: Sabine and San Augustine counties
- Length: 18.640 mi (29.998 km)
- Existed: April 23, 1941–present

Farm to Market Road 1 (FM 1) is located in Sabine and San Augustine counties. Designated in 1941, it was the first farm-to-market road established in Texas, at the request of local industry for a paved road. The 18.6-mile (29.9 km) road provides access to rural areas of East Texas from US 96.

== FM 2 ==
Farm to Market Road 2
- Location: Grimes County
- Length: 6.256 mi (10.068 km)
- Existed: July 29, 1941–present

Farm to Market Road 2 (FM 2) is located in Grimes County.

FM 2 begins at CR 327 in Courtney, approximately 1.5 miles (2.4 km) east of the Washington County line at the Brazos River. It travels along the northeastern edge of the Texas Department of Criminal Justice's O.L. Luther Unit and crosses SH 6. It continues east, passing several prison farms, before ending at FM 362.

FM 2 was designated on July 29, 1941, from Courtney east to SH 6. The designation was extended by approximately 4.4 miles (7.1 km) to FM 362 on May 2, 1962.

In 2017, TxDOT announced plans to convert the at-grade intersection between FM 2 and SH 6, regarded as extremely dangerous, into a diamond interchange. Construction began in November 2021, and opened to traffic in late 2025.

Junction list

The entire route is in Grimes County.

Location	mi	km	Destinations	Notes
	0.0	0.0	County Road 327	
	2.0	3.2	SH 6 – Navasota, Hempstead	Interchange
	6.2	10.0	FM 362	
1.000 mi = 1.609 km; 1.000 km = 0.621 mi

== FM 3 ==
Farm to Market Road 3
- Location: Leon County
- Length: 19.273 mi (31.017 km)
- Existed: March 26, 1942–present

Farm to Market Road 3 (FM 3) is located in southwestern Leon County. Its southern terminus is at FM 39 in Normangee. It travels to the west, providing access to Normangee City Park, prior to turning north. It passes the unincorporated community of Hilltop Lakes before intersecting FM 977. FM 3 reaches its northern terminus at US 79.

A 0.4-mile-long (0.64 km) spur connection, FM Spur 3, connects FM 3 in central Normangee to SH OSR to the south.

FM 3 was designated on March 26, 1942, from Normangee westward to Normangee City Park, as a replacement for SH 265. The route was lengthened to the northwest, first on August 25, 1949, to FM 977, and then on August 1, 1970, to its present terminus at US 79; this extension replaced part of FM 977. The spur connection was designated on November 26, 1969.

== FM 4 ==
Farm to Market Road 4
- Location: Johnson, Hood, Palo Pinto, and Jack counties
- Length: 116.189 mi (186.988 km)
- Existed: March 26, 1942–present

Farm to Market Road 4 (FM 4) is located in Johnson, Hood, Palo Pinto, and Jack counties. It runs from Grandview north and west to Jacksboro.

== FM 5 ==
Farm to Market Road 5
- Location: Parker County
- Length: 11.068 mi (17.812 km)
- Existed: March 26, 1942–present

Farm to Market Road 5 (FM 5) is located in Parker County. It begins at FM 1187 at Aledo. The route briefly travels to the south before turning west and entering Annetta South. It then turns to the north and passes through Annetta and Annetta North. FM 5 ends at I-20 at its exit 415 in Willow Park. The roadway continues under local jurisdiction as Mikus Road.

FM 5 was designated on March 26, 1942, from Aledo due north to US 80, replacing Spur 131. On December 10, 1946, it was extended south and west 6.0 miles (9.7 km) to a road intersection at Annetta. On June 28, 1963, it was extended north to Willow Park, replacing FM 1545. On December 20, 1984, the section north of what was then FM 2376 was transferred to FM 1187, along with FM 2376 itself.

== FM 6 ==
Farm to Market Road 6
- Location: Collin and Hunt counties
- Length: 11.479 mi (18.474 km)
- Existed: March 26, 1942–present

Farm to Market Road 6 (FM 6) is located in Collin and Hunt counties. The road is 11.5 miles (18.5 km) long.

The road begins at an intersection with SH 78 just north of Lavon. From there, it goes east, passing through Nevada and Josephine. The eastern terminus is at SH 66 in Caddo Mills.

FM 6 was designated on March 26, 1942, as a 4.2 miles (6.8 km) from Caddo Mills to Josephine as a replacement for State Spur 115. On July 19, 1945, it was extended west to 1.3 miles (2.1 km) east of Nevada, and another segment was added from Nevada to Lavon. On September 26, 1945, FM 6 was extended from 1.3 miles (2.1 km) east of Nevada to Nevada, connecting the two sections.

== FM 7 ==
Farm to Market Road 7 (FM 7) is a designation that has been used twice. No highway currently uses the FM 7 designation.

=== FM 7 (1942–1948) ===
Farm to Market Road 7
- Location: Hood County
- Length: 5.0 mi (8.0 km)
- Existed: March 26, 1942–November 23, 1948

FM 7 was originally designated on March 26, 1942, as a highway from Lipan to US 281 as a replacement for Spur 108. On June 5, 1945, the road was extended southeast to Granbury. FM 7 was cancelled on November 23, 1948, and became a portion of FM 4.

=== FM 7 (1951–1961) ===
Farm to Market Road 7
- Location: Dallas and Rockwall counties
- Length: 20.1 mi (32.3 km)
- Existed: June 21, 1951–November 30, 1961

The second use of the FM 7 designation was in Dallas and Rockwall counties, from Garland to Rockwall over a former routing of US 67. On June 16, 1957, the road was extended east over old US 67 to Royse City. FM 7 was cancelled on November 30, 1961, and was redesignated as part of SH 66, which also replaced more of old US 67.

== FM 8 ==
Farm to Market Road 8
- Location: Eastland and Erath counties
- Length: 34.816 mi (56.031 km)
- Existed: March 26, 1942–present

Farm to Market Road 8 (FM 8) is located in Eastland and Erath counties. The road is 34.8 miles (56.0 km) long.

The route was designated on March 26, 1942, from Lingleville east to Stephenville, replacing SH 68. On July 19, 1945, the route was extended westward to the Eastland County line. On December 21, 1945, FM 8 was extended further westward to the end of the original FM 96 in Desdemona. On May 17, 1948, the route was extended further westward, reaching Gorman, which was the original endpoint of SH 68, replacing FM 96. The highway was extended west 2.8 miles (4.5 km) on May 26, 1957. The highway was extended east on May 6, 1964, from SH 108 to US 281. The highway was extended west to its current terminus on October 26, 1983, over the previous routing of SH 6.

Junction list

County	Location	mi	km	Destinations	Notes
Eastland		0.0	0.0	SH 6 – Carbon, Gorman	Western teriminus; T intersection
Eastland	Gorman	4.0	6.4	FM 679 south	
Eastland	Gorman	4.6	7.4	SH 6 west – Carbon	Western end of SH 6 concurrency
Eastland	Gorman	4.6	7.4	SH 6 east – De Leon	Eastern end of SH 6 concurrency
Eastland	Gorman	5.1	8.2	FM 2689 north	
Eastland		6.5	10.5	FM 571 north – Ranger	
Eastland		12.1	19.5	FM 2214 west – Lake Leon	
Eastland	Desdemona	12.9	20.8	SH 16 – Strawn, De Leon	
Erath	Lingleville	23.3	37.5	FM 219 – Huckabay, Dublin	
Erath	Stephenville	33.5	53.9	SH 108 – Gordon, Stephenville	
Erath		34.8	56.0	US 281 – Mineral Wells, Hico	Eastern terminus; T intersection
1.000 mi = 1.609 km; 1.000 km = 0.621 mi: Concurrency terminus

== FM 9 ==
Farm to Market Road 9
- Location: Panola and Harrison counties
- Length: 24.935 mi (Note: The certified length given is shorter than the actual mileage, as the Texas Department of Transportation description of FM 9 considers it to be discontinuous at rather than concurrent with US 80 in Waskom.) (40.129 km)
- Existed: May 23, 1951–present

Farm to Market Road 9 (FM 9) is located in Panola and Harrison counties. It is approximately 25 miles (40 km) in length.

FM 9 begins at an intersection with US 79 in the unincorporated community of Panola. The route travels north into Waskom, where it crosses I-20; access from I-20 is provided via exit 633 (eastbound) and 635 (westbound). The route has a brief concurrency with US 80 before turning back toward the north. FM 9 straddles the east side of the Longhorn Army Ammunition Plant before ending near the south shore of Caddo Lake.

The current FM 9 was designated on May 23, 1951. The original route was the segment from US 79 to FM 451 near Elysian Fields. The highway was extended to US 80 in Waskom on November 18, 1953, replacing a section of FM 451, and further north to 4.8 miles (7.7 km) north of US 80 on May 5, 1966, and to 1.9 miles (3.1 km) south of FM 1999 on June 2, 1967. On August 5, 1968 (connecting section designated July 11), the highway was extended north to FM 1999 and FM 2457, and FM 2457 was combined, extending FM 9 to its current terminus.

=== FM 9 (1942) ===
Farm to Market Road 9
- Location: Midland County
- Existed: March 26, 1942–August 3, 1943

A previous FM 9 was formed from Midland south 12.0 miles (19.3 km) on March 26, 1942, when the route was designated from part of SH 137. On August 3, 1943, that route was redesignated as part of SH 349. This was the first Farm to Market Road to be cancelled. That routing has no connection to the current designation.

== FM 10 ==
Farm to Market Road 10
- Location: Panola County
- Length: 10.013 mi (16.114 km)
- Existed: May 23, 1951–present

Farm to Market Road 10 (FM 10) is located in Panola County. The road is 10.0 miles (16.1 km) long.

The road begins at an intersection with FM 999 in Gary City. From there, it goes north to Daniels. Just north of Daniels, there is a brief concurrency with FM 2517. After, it continues north towards the northern terminus at Bus. US 79 in Carthage.

FM 10 was designated on May 23, 1951, along the current route.

=== FM 10 (1942) ===
Farm to Market Road 10
- Location: Angelina and San Augustine counties
- Existed: March 26, 1942–September 9, 1947

A previous route numbered FM 10 was designated on March 26, 1942, from San Augustine to a point on SH 63 near Zavalla as a replacement of SH 147. FM 10 was cancelled on September 9, 1947, and changed back to SH 147.

== FM 11 ==
Farm to Market Road 11
- Location: Ward, Crane, and Pecos counties
- Length: 51.580 mi (83.010 km)
- Existed: March 26, 1942–present

Farm to Market Road 11 (FM 11) is located in Ward, Crane, and Pecos counties. The 51.6-mile (83.0 km) road begins at SH 18 in Grandfalls and passes through Imperial and Girvin before terminating at I-10 in Bakersfield.

The road was designated in 1942 between Grandfalls and Imperial and has been incrementally lengthened over the years incorporating a former route of FM 847 before the road was completed in 1975. The road crosses US 67 and US 385 in Girvin.

== RM 12 ==
Ranch to Market Road 12
- Location: Hays and Travis counties
- Length: 37.931 mi (61.044 km)
- Existed: March 26, 1942–present

Ranch to Market Road 12 (RM 12) is located in Hays and Travis counties. It is 37.9 miles (61.0 km) in length.

The southern terminus of RM 12 is in San Marcos at I-35 exit 202. From there, it proceeds along Wonder World Drive along the far west edge of San Marcos. RM 12 continues west from San Marcos to intersect with RM 32 (at "The Junction") and then heads north to Wimberley. RM 12 then continues through Woodcreek to Dripping Springs, where it crosses US 290. From there, it continues north through the community of Fitzhugh to its terminus at RM 3238 (Hamilton Pool Road), approximately six miles west of Bee Cave.

RM 12 was formed from the segment of SH 80 from San Marcos to Wimberley on March 26, 1942. On May 31, 1945, it was extended north to Dripping Springs. On December 19, 1963, it was extended again, from Loop 82 to I-35. On June 2, 1967, it was extended north 5.0 miles (8.0 km) to a road intersection. On May 30, 1987, it was extended north to RM 3238 and a county road.

A planned expansion of RM 12 between Dripping Springs and Wimberley to a four- and five-lane divided highway was defeated as part of a county bond election in 2007.

Following the opening of San Marcos's Wonder World Drive extension project, state and local officials redesignated Wonder World Drive, previously designated FM 3407, as part of RM 12, moving the southern terminus to SH 123. The original portion of RM 12 through San Marcos was redesignated as an extension of SH 80 on the state highway system on June 24, 2010.

== FM 13 ==
Farm to Market Road 13
- Location: Smith, Cherokee, and Rusk counties
- Length: 20.496 mi (32.985 km)
- Existed: March 26, 1942–present

Farm to Market Road 13 (FM 13) is a 20.5-mile (33.0 km) road, located in Smith, Cherokee. and Rusk counties, that begins at SH 135 in Troup and travels eastward with a major intersection at SH 42 in Price before terminating at Bus. US 79 and Bus. SH 64 in Henderson. The road also passes through the town of Henry's Chapel.

FM 13 begins in Troup at SH 135 in Smith County. The road proceeds along E. Duval Street and then turns south along S. Price Street. The road then turns to the southeast along the edge of town before FM 1089 branches off to the west near the Cherokee County line. The route continues to the southeast to Henry's Chapel where FM 856 branches to the south. The road then goes to the northeast and enters Rusk County before crossing SH 42 in Price. The road then proceeds eastward toward Henderson and intersects Loop 571 west of town. The road enters Henderson following W. Main St. until it terminates at Bus. US 79 and Bus. SH 64.

The road encounters terrain of gentle relief for its entire length.

The route that would become FM 13 was designated as SH 324 between Henderson and Carlisle on October 30, 1939. The town of Carlisle was renamed Price the following year. The highway was redesignated FM 13 on March 26, 1942. A second, discontinuous segment of the road was designated on June 11, 1945, between Troup and the Cherokee–Rusk county line west of Price, and the uniting segment from that county line to Price was designated on February 20, 1946.

== FM 14 ==
Farm to Market Road 14
- Location: Smith and Wood counties
- Length: 41.545 mi (66.860 km)
- Existed: March 26, 1942–present

Farm to Market Road 14 (FM 14) is a 41.545-mile (66.860 km) state road in Smith and Wood counties. It begins at Loop 323 in Tyler and travels northward with a major intersection at I-20 near Shady Grove before terminating at SH 154 south of Winnsboro. The road also passes through the town of Hawkins. The road was designated in 1942.

FM 14 begins in Tyler at Loop 323 in Smith County. The road proceeds along State Park Highway through Shady Grove (where it intersects I-20) and Red Springs, where it turns to the northeast. The road then turns to the north, crossing into Wood County and passing through Hawkins, where it intersects US 80. It continues north through the towns of Pine Mills and Oak Grove to the northern terminus at SH 154.

FM 14 was designated as SH 270 between Tyler and Sand Flat on June 21, 1938. The highway was redesignated FM 14 on March 26, 1942. The road was extended to SH 154 on June 11, 1945, and to the current northern terminus on July 14, 1949. On May 31, 1966, the portion from Spur 147 to US 271 became an extension of Spur 147. The road was rerouted east to US 271 on September 27, 1971. The portion from Loop 323 to US 271 was redesignated Urban Road 14 (UR 14) on June 27, 1995. The designation reverted to FM 14 with the elimination of the Urban Road system on November 15, 2018.

Junction list

County	Location	mi	km	Destinations	Notes
Smith	Tyler	0.0	0.0	US 271 (E. Gentry Parkway) – Gladewater, Tyler	
Smith	Tyler	2.0	3.2	Loop 323 (E. Northwest Loop)	
Smith		6.4	10.3	I-20 – Dallas, Shreveport	I-20 exit 562
Smith		8.6	13.8	PR 16 west – Tyler State Park	
Smith	Red Springs	12.2	19.6	FM 16 – Lindale, Winona	
Smith		12.5	20.1	FM 2710 west – Lindale	
Smith		16.0	25.7	FM 2015 south	
Wood	Hawkins	18.9	30.4	US 80 – Mineola, Longview	
Wood		20.3	32.7	FM 1795 north – Shady Grove	
Wood		22.0	35.4	FM 2659 south	
Wood		23.7	38.1	FM 2869 – Winnsboro	
Wood		31.2	50.2	FM 49 – Mineola, Gilmer	
Wood		36.0	57.9	SH 154 – Quitman, Gilmer	
Wood		37.8	60.8	FM 2088 – Quitman, Perryville	
Wood		41.5	66.8	SH 37 – Quitman, Winnsboro	
1.000 mi = 1.609 km; 1.000 km = 0.621 mi

== FM 15 ==
Farm to Market Road 15
- Location: Smith County
- Length: 10.302 mi (16.579 km)
- Existed: March 26, 1942–present

Farm to Market Road 15 (FM 15) is a 10.3-mile (16.6 km) route in Smith County. From its western terminus at SH 135 in Troup, it runs eastward along East Bryant Street. Outside the city limits, it continues eastward before turning to the north and then to the northeast in the community of Salem. The eastern terminus of FM 15 is at SH 64 in Wright City.

The route that is currently FM 15 was designated as SH 269 on June 21, 1938. It was redesignated FM 15 on March 26, 1942.

== FM 16 ==
Farm to Market Road 16
- Location: Van Zandt and Smith counties
- Length: 42.010 mi (Note: The certified length given is shorter than the actual mileage, as the Texas Department of Transportation description of FM 16 considers it to be discontinuous at rather than concurrent with SH 110 in Van.) (67.609 km)
- Existed: March 26, 1942–present

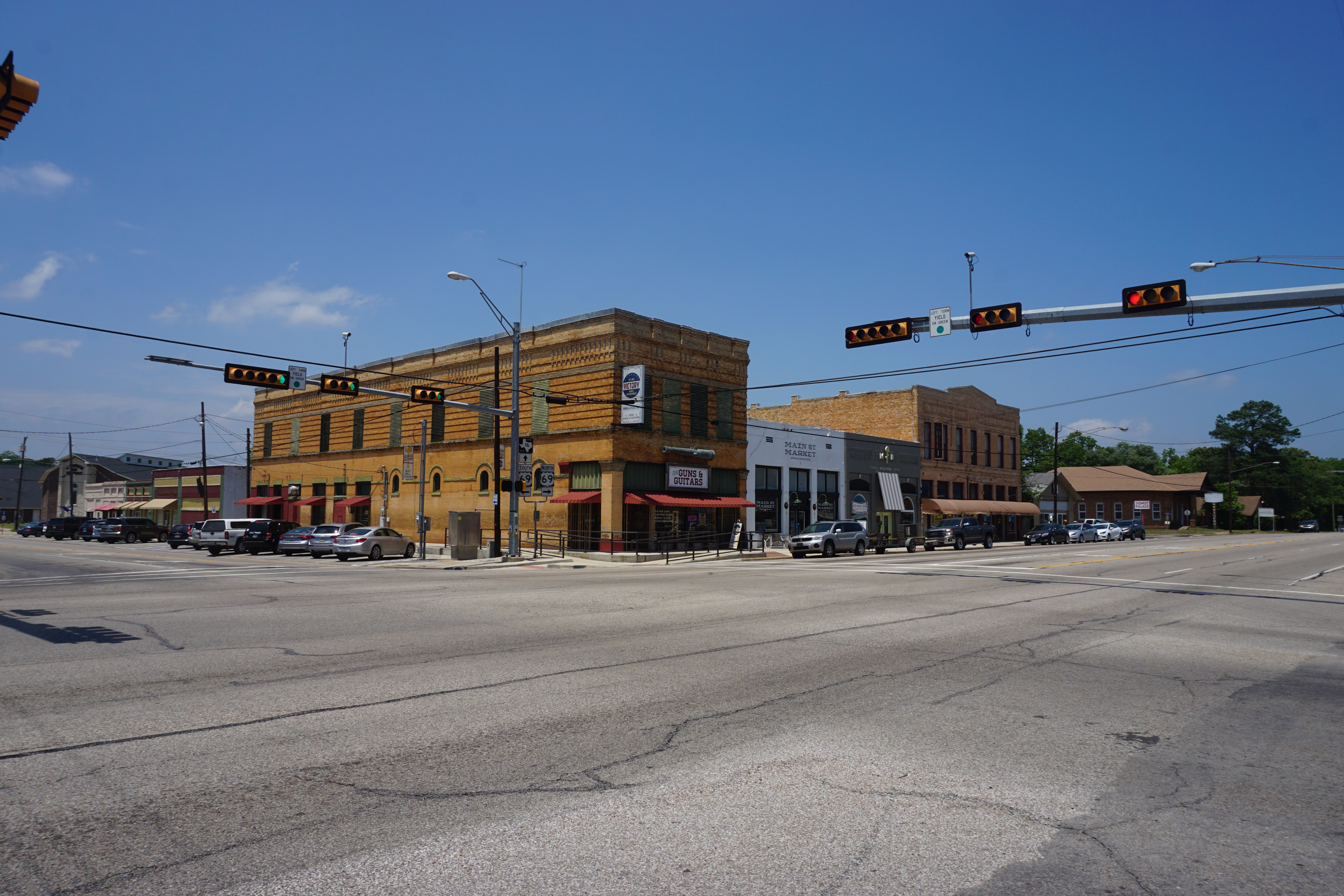
FM 16 as Hubbard Street at the intersection with US 69 in Lindale

Farm to Market Road 16 (FM 16) is located in Van Zandt and Smith counties. The road is 42 miles (68 km) long.

The road begins at an intersection with SH 64 just west of Colfax. From there, it goes east through Colfax and Van, intersecting I-20 at an interchange. From Van, the road continues east along SH 110 passing through the towns of Garden Valley, Hideaway, Lindale, Red Springs, and Winona, where it has a brief concurrency with SH 155. From Winona, the road continues east to the eastern terminus at US 271.

FM 16 was formed on March 26, 1942, from Colfax to Van, replacing a part of SH 243. The road was extended to the current western terminus just west of Colfax and eastward to Lindale on June 11, 1945, creating a concurrency with SH 110. The road was extended east to Winona on February 14, 1947, and extended to its current length on October 29, 1948.

== FM 17 ==
Farm to Market Road 17
- Location: Van Zandt and Wood counties
- Length: 34.590 mi (55.667 km)
- Existed: March 26, 1942–present

Farm to Market Road 17 (FM 17) is located in Van Zandt and Wood counties. The road is 34.6 miles (55.7 km) long.

The road begins at an intersection with SH 64 near Canton. From there, it goes northeast, intersecting I-20 at an interchange. The road continues on to SH 110 in Grand Saline, Texas. The road then follows SH 110 to US 80. The road follows US 80 before heading northeast and north to FM 515. The road follows FM 515 east and then heads north and east to SH 154 in Yantis.

FM 17 was formed on March 26, 1942, from Grand Saline to Alba, replacing a part of SH 110. The road was extended southwest 7.0 miles (11.3 km) on January 11, 1945. On June 11 of that year, the road was extended southwest to Canton, its current southern terminus. The road was extended to Yantis on December 17, 1947. The road was extended along old US 69 in Alba on October 26, 1954. On October 31, 1957, the road was extended east 4.0 miles (6.4 km) from Yantis. On October 11, 1961, the section from Yantis east 4.0 miles (6.4 km) was transferred to FM 2225. This section of FM 2225 became part of FM 2966 on October 6, 1980, due to construction of Lake Fork Reservoir, which caused some parts of FM 2225 to be inundated and also resulted in FM 17 being relocated along FM 515 over Lake Fork Reservoir, as the old route was inundated (part is now part of FM 514 and FM Spur 514).

== FM 18 ==
Farm to Market Road 18
- Location: Taylor and Callahan counties
- Length: 18.6 mi (29.9 km)
- Existed: September 19, 1951–present

Farm to Market Road 18 (FM 18) is located in Taylor and Callahan counties. It is approximately 18.6 miles (29.9 km) long.

FM 18 begins at an intersection with SH 36 in Abilene near Abilene Regional Airport. The highway leaves the city limits and enters Callahan County at Elmdale Road. The highway runs east and enters Clyde near FM 1707. FM 18 has an interchange with FM 604 before running through town on South 1st Street before turning at a nearly 90 degree angle onto Stephens Street. The highway makes another turn at FM 258 before leaving the town. FM 18 runs east to Baird where it ends at an intersection with BL I-20.

The current route was designated on September 19, 1951, from a segment of US 80. The section from SH 36 to Elmdale Community was redesignated Urban Road 18 (UR 18) on June 27, 1995. The designation reverted to FM 18 with the elimination of the Urban Road system on November 15, 2018.

=== RM 18 (1942) ===
Ranch to Market Road 18
- Location: Mitchell County
- Existed: March 26, 1942–April 23, 1947

RM 18 was formed on March 26, 1942, from part of SH 208 from Colorado City, Texas south 6.0 miles (9.7 km). On April 29, 1942, another section was added from Robert Lee, Texas north 6.0 miles (9.7 km) to the county road to Sanco. On November 18, 1944, the gap between 6.0 miles (9.7 km) miles north of Robert Lee and 6.0 miles (9.7 km) miles south of Colorado City was filled. This route was cancelled on April 23, 1947, when it became an extension of SH 208.

== FM 19 ==
Farm to Market Road 19
- Location: Anderson County
- Length: 13.362 mi (21.504 km)
- Existed: April 29, 1942–present

Farm to Market Road 19 (FM 19) is located in Anderson County. The road is 13.4 miles (21.6 km) long.

The road begins at an intersection with SH 155 in Frankston. From there, it goes south to Neches, via Todd City. The southern terminus is at FM 2574.

FM 19 was designated on April 29, 1942, as a route between Neches and Todd City. It was extended north to Frankston on May 19 of that year. On October 24, 1944, the portion from Todd City to Frankston was canceled due to the extension of SH 155 to Palestine. On December 17, 1952, FM 19 was extended back from Todd City to Frankston. The original section from had been designated as SH 272 on June 21, 1938, while it was being built. When the route was built some time after September 26, 1939, SH 272 was cancelled, meaning the road was already built at the time FM 19 was designated.

== FM 20 ==
Farm to Market Road 20
- Location: Bastrop, Caldwell, and Guadalupe counties
- Length: 54.213 mi (87.247 km)
- Existed: April 29, 1942–present

Farm to Market Road 20 (FM 20) is located in Bastrop, Caldwell, and Guadalupe counties. The road is 54.2 miles (87.2 km) long.

The road begins at an intersection with SH 71 just west of Bastrop. From there, it goes southwest, passing through Red Rock. At Lockhart, it becomes concurrent with US 183 for a 0.1-mile segment, then turns off to the west on State Park Road. It continues southwest, passing through Fentress, until its southern terminus at SH 123 just north of Seguin.

FM 20 was designated on April 29, 1942, from Bastrop southwestward to Lockhart (this was part of SH 21 before 1939). On April 18, 1958, it was extended southwest to FM 621, replacing FM 964. Six days later, it was extended southwest to just north of Seguin, replacing a section of FM 621. However, the signs did not change until the 1959 Texas Travel Map was released to the public; On October 31, 1958, around the time the signs were changed, the current FM 964 was designated.

== FM 21 ==
Farm to Market Road 21
- Location: Franklin, Titus, and Camp counties
- Length: 15.89 mi (25.57 km)
- Existed: April 29, 1942–present

Farm to Market Road 21 (FM 21) is located in Franklin, Titus, and Camp counties. It is approximately 15.9 miles (25.6 km) long.

FM 21 begins at an intersection with SH 11. It then proceeds through a relatively empty, farming area of Camp County. After approximately 3.6 miles (5.8 km), FM 21 crosses Lake Bob Sandlin. The bridge that crosses Lake Bob Sandlin is approximately a half a mile long (0.8 km). After crossing the lake, FM 21 passes Lake Bob Sandlin State Park. The road then passes through the unincorporated community of Blodgett. After this, FM 21 passes through a long stretch of open farmland before passing through Hopewell and continues to its northern terminus of SH 37.

FM 21 was designated on April 29, 1942, as a 5.5-mile (8.9 km) road traveling from SH 11 to around Lake Bob Sandlin State Park. Later that day, another segment from created from SH 37 through Hopewell to Macon (erroneously shown as FM 28 on one administration order), creating a gap in the route. The gap was filled on June 11, 1945.

== FM 22 ==
Farm to Market Road 22
- Location: Cherokee County
- Length: 9.070 mi (14.597 km)
- Existed: April 29, 1942–present

Farm to Market Road 22 (FM 22) is located in north-central Cherokee County. It is approximately 9.1 miles (14.6 km) long.

The western terminus of FM 22 is at an intersection with US 69 in Craft. The route travels east through Turney and Gallatin, where it is known as 1st Avenue and has a brief concurrency with FM 768. FM 22 continues eastward and ends at an intersection with SH 110 south of the community of Ponta.

FM 22 was commissioned on April 29, 1942, along the current route. On May 7, 1970, a section west of US 69 at Craft, connecting to FM 347 south of Jacksonville, was added, increasing the length by 1.2 miles (1.9 km). This addition was removed from the state highway system on March 1, 1972, in exchange for the creation of FM 3198.

== FM 23 ==
Farm to Market Road 23
- Location: Cherokee County
- Length: 14.56 mi (23.43 km)
- Existed: April 29, 1942–present

Farm to Market Road 23 (FM 23) is located in Cherokee County.

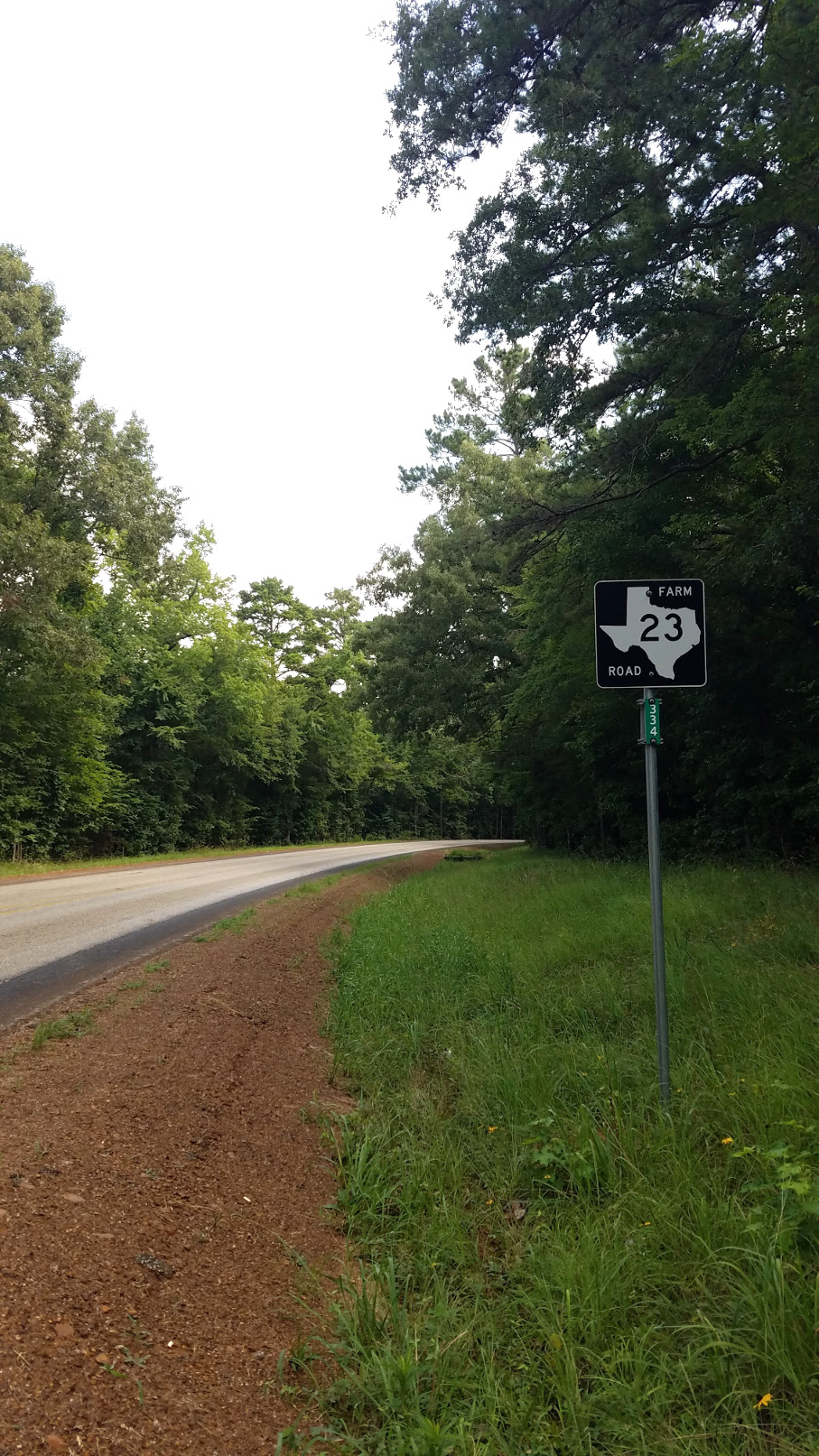
FM 23 in Cherokee County, July 2016.

FM 23 begins at an intersection with SH 294. It travels through empty agricultural areas of Cherokee County, and serves as both endpoints for FM 1857. FM 23 passes Russell Cemetery outside of Rusk. It crosses FM 343 as it enters Rusk. FM 23 travels through the city before ending at an intersection with Loop 62 and FM 752.

FM 23 was designated on April 29, 1942, along the current route.

== FM 24 ==
Farm to Market Road 24
- Location: Nueces County
- Length: 5.056 mi (8.137 km)
- Existed: May 23, 1951–present

Farm to Market Road 24 (FM 24) is located in Nueces County. It is locally known as Violet Road. The highway's southern terminus is at SH 44 in Violet. It runs north into Corpus Christi, passing several churches, and the small Violet Park, before intersecting Spur 407. It continues to its northern terminus at exit 11B of I-37.

FM 24 was designated on May 23, 1951, from SH 44 to Spur 407 (then SH 9). It was extended to its current length on September 5, 1973.

=== FM 24 (1942) ===
Farm to Market Road 24
- Location: Coleman County
- Existed: April 29, 1942–June 22, 1944

A previous route numbered FM 24 was designated in Coleman County on April 29, 1942, from Coleman west to the New Central School. It was 9.5 miles (15.3 km) in length. The entire route was then cancelled on June 22, 1944, and transferred to FM 53 (now SH 153).

== FM 25 ==
Farm to Market Road 25
- Location: Comal and Guadalupe counties
- Existed: April 29, 1942–September 28, 1988

Farm to Market Road 25 (FM 25) was located in Comal and Guadalupe counties. No highway currently uses the FM 25 designation.

FM 25 was designated on April 29, 1942, from US 81 (now Business I-35) near New Braunfels to US 90 near Seguin. On October 28, 1960, FM 25 was signed, but not designated, as an extension of SH 46. On June 9, 1966, the section from US 90 north to I-10 was redesignated as an extension of Spur 351 (but still signed as part of SH 46). On February 26, 1968, the section from I-35 northwest 0.26 miles (0.42 km) was transferred to SH 46 and Loop 337. The remainder of FM 25 was cancelled on September 28, 1988, and transferred to SH 46. Spur 351, which by then had been extended south to SH 123, became part of SH 46 on May 14, 1990.

== FM 26 ==
Farm to Market Road 26
- Location: Martin and Dawson counties
- Length: 23.247 mi (37.412 km)
- Existed: April 29, 1942–present

Farm to Market Road 26 (FM 26) is located in Martin and Dawson counties.

The southern terminus of FM 26 is at FM 846 in Martin County. It runs northwest, intersecting FM 2212 in the community of Brown, before turning west. The route turns to the northwest again at its intersection with FM 3263. FM 26 is briefly concurrent FM 2002 before splitting off and entering Dawson County. Continuing to the northwest, FM 26 crosses FM 828 in Sparenburg before reaching its northern terminus at US 87.

FM 26 was designated on April 29, 1942, from US 87 south of Lamesa to Sparenberg in Dawson County, and was 5.3 miles (8.5 km) in length. FM 26 was extended south 4.0 miles (6.4 km) on November 20, 1951, and to the Martin County line on March 26, 1953, adding another 0.2 miles (0.32 km); that same day, a 1.8 miles (2.9 km) farm to market road from there to FM 1742 was designated, but not yet numbered. On April 9, 1953, the road was extended southwest over the unnumbered road to FM 1742, and FM 1742 was cancelled and combined with FM 26.

== FM 27 ==
Farm to Market Road 27
- Location: Freestone and Limestone counties
- Length: 27.247 mi (43.850 km)
- Existed: April 29, 1942–present

Farm to Market Road 27 (FM 27) is located in Freestone and Limestone counties.

The western terminus of FM 27 is at SH 171. In Wortham, FM 27 passes Wortham High School before passing through downtown. It runs concurrently with FM 80 just south of Kirvin. FM 27 then enters Fairfield and reaches its eastern terminus at US 84.

FM 27 was designated on April 29, 1942, from Fairfield to Wortham, approximately 18.5 miles (29.8 km). This was SH 210 before 1939. On February 15, 1950, the highway was extended from Wortham to the Limestone County line, replacing FM 1450 and adding approximately 1.6 miles (2.6 km). On September 27, 1960, FM 27 was extended by 7.4 miles (11.9 km) to its current length.

== FM 28 ==
Farm to Market Road 28
- Location: Floyd and Crosby counties
- Length: 29.675 mi (47.757 km)
- Existed: June 23, 1942–present

Farm to Market Road 28 (FM 28) is located in Crosby and Floyd counties.

FM 28's southern terminus is at an intersection with US 82/SH 114. From there, FM 28 heads north, then east, then north again. Turning to the northwest, it passes through Dougherty before turning to the north again to an intersection with US 62/US 70. FM 28 runs concurrently with these highways for about one mile (1.6 km) before again heading north, reaching its northern terminus at County Roads 200 and 303.

FM 28 was designated in Floyd County on June 23, 1942, from US 70 to Dougherty. On July 21, 1949, FM 28 was extended to the Crosby County line, adding approximately 8.2 miles (13.2 km). On October 26, 1954, FM 28 was extended south to FM 1441 (which later became part of FM 193). On November 1, 1954, FM 28 was extended to its current southern terminus, FM 1441 was truncated, and FM 1472 was cancelled. On March 24, 1958, FM 28 was extended 5.3 miles (8.5 km) northward to its current northern terminus, as FM 2265 was cancelled and combined.

== FM 29 ==
Farm to Market Road 29 (FM 29) is a designation that has been used twice. No highway currently uses the FM 29 designation.

=== FM 29 (1942–1949) ===
Farm to Market Road 29
- Location: Grimes County
- Length: 22.1 mi (35.6 km)
- Existed: April 29, 1942–May 20, 1949

FM 29 was designated on April 29, 1942, along a road in Grimes County from SH 90 near Singleton to Iola. The road was 11.0 miles (17.7 km) long. On January 27, 1949, FM 29 was extended north to North Zulch. On May 20, 1949, the designation was cancelled, with the road becoming an extension of FM 39.

=== FM 29 (1951–1967) ===
Farm to Market Road 29
- Location: Val Verde County
- Length: 1.9 mi (3.1 km)
- Existed: May 23, 1951–October 27, 1967

The FM 29 designation was later applied to a road in Val Verde County, beginning at US 90 (later Loop 406, now Spur 406) northwest of Devils River and heading northeast to Lake Walk. When it was designated, the road was 2.12 miles (3.41 km) long; by 1965, the highway had been truncated to 1.9 miles (3.1 km). FM 29 was cancelled on October 27, 1967, because the roadway was to be inundated by Amistad Reservoir. As a result, the road was permanently closed.

== FM 30 ==
Farm to Market Road 30
- Location: Uvalde County
- Length: 3.622 mi (5.829 km)
- Existed: May 23, 1951–present

Farm to Market Road 30 (FM 30) is located in Uvalde County. The road begins at SH 127 3.0 miles (4.8 km) northwest of Sabinal, and proceeds northward to end at a county road.

=== FM 30 (1942) ===
Farm to Market Road 30
- Location: Childress County
- Length: 24 mi (39 km)
- Existed: April 29, 1942–January 7, 1948

The original Farm to Market Road 30, designated on April 29, 1942, ran from Memphis east to a connection with US 83 in Childress County. FM 30 was cancelled on January 7, 1948, and became part of SH 256.

== FM 31 ==
Farm to Market Road 31
- Location: Harrison and Panola counties
- Length: 43.335 mi (69.741 km)
- Existed: April 29, 1942–present

Farm to Market Road 31 (FM 31) is located in Harrison and Panola counties. The highway begins at US 59 (Future I-369) in Marshall, turning southeast while intersecting I-20 outside the city limits. In the community of Crossroads, FM 2625 passes through while FM 2199 ends completely, all while FM 31 continues southeastward. In the town of Elysian Fields, FM 451 ends as FM 31 heads into Panola County. The highway intersects US 79 in De Berry. The road has a small concurrency with FM 123 in Carthage. Further south, FM 2517 makes a four-way intersection there, where a few miles to the east FM 3359 is formed. The highway ends at the Louisiana state line, where it becomes LA 765.

FM 31 was designated on April 29, 1942, from US 59 in Marshall to Elysian Fields. On June 11, 1945, it was extended southward to the Panola County line. Seven days later, it was extended south to De Berry. On November 20, 1951, it was extended south to what was then FM 998. On January 7, 1952, FM 31 was extended southward to the Louisiana state line, replacing a section of FM 123 (which was rerouted over FM 998 instead).

== RM 32 ==
Ranch to Market Road 32
- Location: Blanco, Comal, and Hays counties
- Length: 23.23 mi (37.39 km)
- Existed: April 29, 1942–present

Ranch to Market Road 32 (RM 32) is located in Blanco, Comal, and Hays counties. The road begins at US 281 south of Blanco, and continues east as it enters Comal County. In Fischer, FM 3424 ends there, and upon entering Hays County, the highway ends at an intersection with RM 12 in Wimberley.

RM 32 was designated as SH 232 between SH 80 in Wimberley and US 281 on August 1, 1936. SH 80 was truncated and the western terminus became RM 12 on March 26, 1942; at the same time, SH 232 was to be redesignated as an RM road once the counties agreed to do so, which happened by April 29, 1942, when RM 32 was designated, replacing SH 232.

== RM 33 ==
Ranch to Market Road 33
- Location: Howard, Glasscock, and Reagan counties
- Length: 57.48 mi (92.51 km)
- Existed: April 29, 1942–present

Ranch to Market Road 33 (RM 33) is located in Howard, Glasscock, and Reagan counties. It runs from US 87, 4 miles (6.4 km) south of Big Spring, south to SH 137.

RM 33 was designated on April 29, 1942, from US 87 south of Big Spring south 6.4 miles (10.3 km) to the Glasscock County line. On February 11, 1944, the designation was extended south to Garden City. On June 11, 1945, the route was extended south to Big Lake. On October 29, 1948, RM 33 was extended south and east to SH 163. On July 14, 1949, it was extended east to Eldorado, replacing FM 865. By 1966, the section from RM 1980 (now US 190) to Eldorado was signed, but not designated, as SH 29, and by 1969, the section from RM 1800 south to RM 1980 was signed, but not designated, as SH 137. On June 30, 1977, the section from Eldorado west to RM 1980 (along with RM 1980 itself) was transferred to US 190. On May 16, 1984, the section of RM 33 from SH 137 south to US 190 officially became part of SH 137.

Junction list

County	Location	mi	km	Destinations	Notes
Reagan		0.0	0.0	SH 137 – Stiles, Big Lake	
Reagan		13.4	21.6	RM 2600 east	
Reagan		16.4	26.4	FM 1357 west to SH 137	
Glasscock		25.2	40.6	RM 2401 west – Saint Lawrence	
Glasscock	Garden City	35.3	56.8	SH 158 – Midland, Sterling City	
Glasscock		50.0	80.5	FM 461 to US 87 – Lomax	
Howard		56.8	91.4	FM 818 west – Elbow	
Howard		57.6	92.7	US 87 – Big Spring, San Angelo	Interchange
1.000 mi = 1.609 km; 1.000 km = 0.621 mi

== FM 34 ==
Farm to Market Road 34
- Location: Hudspeth County
- Length: 2.612 mi (4.204 km)
- Existed: April 29, 1942–present

Farm to Market Road 34 (FM 34) is located in Hudspeth County.

The southern terminus of FM 34 is at FM 192, approximately 15 miles (24 km) southeast of Fort Hancock. The road proceeds north for 2.6 miles (4.2 km) before ending at I-10 exit 87.

FM 34 was designated on April 29, 1942, along the current route.

== FM 35 ==
Farm to Market Road 35
- Location: Rockwall and Hunt counties
- Length: 7.304 mi (11.755 km)
- Existed: April 29, 1942–present

Farm to Market Road 35 (FM 35) is located in Rockwall and Hunt counties. The road begins at I-30 in Royse City and runs to SH 276.

FM 35 was designated on April 29, 1942, from Quinlan to Mexico. On November 23, 1948, the section from Union Valley to Quinlan was added, creating a concurrency with SH 34. On November 30, 1949, the road was extended east 4.0 miles (6.4 km) to Sabine River Bottom. On December 17, 1952, the road was extended west 4.9 miles (7.9 km) to the Rockwall County line. On February 26, 1953, the road was extended west to the new location of US 67 (now I-30), replacing FM 1396. On October 26, 1954, the road was extended east to the Rains County line. On November 29, 1954, the road was extended east to US 69 (now FM 2795) at Emory, replacing FM 2102 and creating a concurrency with FM 47. On April 1, 1959, the Union Valley-Quinlan section was revised to end at Loop 264 instead of SH 34 (a 0.5-mile (0.80 km) section of FM 35 was transferred to Loop 264). On December 15, 1959, the concurrency with FM 47 was removed. On October 15, 1970, the section of FM 35 from Loop 264 west 5.8 miles (9.3 km) miles was transferred to SH 276. On October 25, 1990, a 21.3-mile (34.3 km) section of FM 35 from SH 34 east to US 69 was also transferred to SH 276.

Junction list

County	Location	mi	km	Destinations	Notes
Hunt		0.0	0.0	SH 276 – Rockwall, Quinlan	
Hunt	Union Valley	1.1	1.8	FM 1565 – Poetry, Caddo Mills	
Rockwall	Royse City	5.5	8.9	FM 2642 north	
Rockwall	Royse City	6.3	10.1	FM 2453 south	
Rockwall	Royse City	7.3	11.7	I-30 (US 67) – Dallas, Greenville	I-30 exit 77B
1.000 mi = 1.609 km; 1.000 km = 0.621 mi

== FM 36 ==
Farm to Market Road 36
- Location: Hunt County
- Length: 29.725 mi (Note: The certified length given is shorter than the actual mileage, as the Texas Department of Transportation description of FM 36 considers it to be discontinuous at rather than concurrent with SH 66 and US 380.) (47.838 km)
- Existed: April 29, 1942–present

Farm to Market Road 36 (FM 36) is located in Hunt County. The road begins at SH 276 west of Quinlan and ends at FM 1562. There are concurrencies with US 380 and SH 66.

FM 36 was designated on April 29, 1942, from SH 24 (now US 380) west of Floyd to Merit. On September 12, 1946, the section from SH 24 at Floyd south to US 67 (now SH 66) at or near Caddo Mills was added, creating a concurrency with SH 24. On November 30, 1949, the road was extended southeast 4.0 miles (6.4 km) from Caddo Mills. On October 28, 1953, the road was extended north to FM 1562. On October 26, 1954, the road was extended south to FM 35 (now SH 276). On June 24, 2010, the section of FM 36 from US 380 to BU 380-J was removed from the state highway system. FM 36 was instead realigned over the new US 380.

Junction list

The entire route is in Hunt County.

Location	mi	km	Destinations	Notes
	0.0	0.0	SH 276 – Rockwall, Royse City, Quinlan	
	6.9	11.1	FM 1564 east	
	8.7– 9.4	14.0– 15.1	I-30 (US 67) – Dallas, Greenville	I-30 exit 85
	11.1	17.9	FM 1903 east	
Caddo Mills	13.0	20.9	SH 66 west – Royse City	South end of SH 66 overlap
Caddo Mills	13.1	21.1	SH 66 east – Greenville	North end of SH 66 overlap
Clinton	16.0	25.7	FM 3211 east	
	19.2	30.9	US 380 east / County Road 1118 – Greenville, Floyd	South end of US 380 overlap
	19.8	31.9	Bus. US 380 east – Floyd	
	20.6	33.2	US 380 west – McKinney	North end of US 380 overlap
	24.5	39.4	FM 1569 east – Wagner	
Merit	25.5	41.0	FM 2194 – Farmersville, Kellogg	
	31.9	51.3	FM 1562 – Blue Ridge, Celeste	
1.000 mi = 1.609 km; 1.000 km = 0.621 mi: Concurrency terminus

== FM 37 ==
Farm to Market Road 37
- Location: Bailey, Lamb, Hale, and Floyd counties
- Length: 84.621 mi (136.184 km)
- Existed: April 29, 1942–present

Farm to Market Road 37 (FM 37) is located in Bailey, Lamb, Hale, and Floyd counties. Its western terminus is at SH 214 north of Enochs in Bailey County. FM 37 runs eastward to FM 54, with which it shares a brief concurrency through Bula and across the Lamb County line. After separating from FM 54, FM 37 briefly turns north before resuming an easterly route toward Amherst, crossing US 84. It crosses US 385 at Cofferville and has short concurrencies with FM 1072 through Fieldton and FM 168 at Harts Camp before entering Hale County. The route crosses I-27/US 87 east of Cotton Center, running in a southern direction concurrent with the freeway's frontage road between exits 32 and 31. Resuming its eastward routing, FM 37 has short concurrencies with FM 400 and FM 789. It then crosses into Floyd County, where it briefly shares its alignment with FM 378, before reaching its eastern terminus at US 62 in Floydada.

FM 37 was designated on April 29, 1942, from a junction with US 84 to Amherst. On March 18, 1944, the route was extended to include a strip from Amherst to SH 51. On December 16, 1948, it was extended east 5.8 miles (9.3 km) to what is now FM 1072. On September 19, 1968, FM 37 was expanded to its present length, replacing several routes: FM 2189 from SH 214 to FM 54; FM 1928 from FM 54 to US 84; a section of FM 1072 (which was rerouted to the north, replacing part of FM 1842) from FM 1072 to FM 168; FM 1315 from FM 168 to FM 400; and FM 579 from FM 400 to US 62.

== FM 38 ==
Farm to Market Road 38
- Location: Lamar and Delta counties
- Length: 33.301 mi (53.593 km)
- Existed: April 29, 1942–present

Farm to Market Road 38 (FM 38) is located in Lamar and Delta counties. The road begins at US 82 west of Petty and turns north and east to Maxey, then southeast through Brookston and Roxton to Ben Franklin.

FM 38 was designated on April 29, 1942, from US 82 west of Brookston through Roxton to Noble, with the section from US 82 to Roxton replacing SH 188. On April 30, 1945, the Roxton-Noble section was cancelled and became part of FM 137. FM 38 was expanded to include a section from the Lamar County line to FM 128 at Ben Franklin on June 9, 1947, creating a gap in the highway. This gap was closed on February 27, 1948, when FM 38 was extended from Roxton to Ben Franklin. On August 23, 1948, FM 38 was again extended north over the old location of US 82 to the new location of US 82. On February 1, 1949, the road was extended northwest to Maxey, replacing FM 907. On August 25, 1949, FM 38 was extended to US 82 west of Petty.

== FM 39 ==
Farm to Market Road 39
- Location: Limestone, Leon, Madison, and Grimes counties
- Length: 82.927 mi (133.458 km)
- Existed: April 29, 1942–present

Farm to Market Road 39 (FM 39) is located in Limestone, Leon, Madison, and Grimes counties. The road begins at SH 14 in Mexia, and turns south, intersecting SH 164 before FM 80 ends directly parallel to the Freestone County line. However, no part of the road's mileage is in Freestone County, as the road turns south to Leon County shortly afterward. The highway then intersects with US 79 in Jewett and then intersects with SH 7 in the community of Concord. As the highway turns directly south, it intersects FM 977 in Flynn. In Normangee, it intersects SH OSR, where it enters Madison County, and has a concurrency with FM 1452 in the community of George. The highway subsequently intersects a concurrent SH 21/US 190 in North Zulch. As it enters Grimes County, the road bypasses Iola, and ends at SH 90 north of Singleton.

When it was designated on April 29, 1942, the road considered of the section from Normangee to Flynn. On August 3, 1943, the road was expanded to include a segment from Mexia to Personville, creating a gap in the highway. The road's southern portion was expanded on February 28, 1945, to include US 190 at North Zulch, and the northern strip received a segment from Personville to Jewett. On April 18, 1947, the southern strip was expanded again to Robbins. The highway was extended from Jewett to Robbins on December 16, 1948, closing the gap. On May 20, 1949, FM 39 was extended south through Iola to Singleton, replacing Farm to Market Road 29. On June 21, 1982, the highway was slightly modified to go via Tyler Street instead of McKinney Street in Mexia, giving it its present-day length.

== FM 40 ==
Farm to Market Road 40
- Location: Lubbock and Crosby counties
- Length: 32.515 mi (Note: The certified length given is shorter than the actual mileage, as the Texas Department of Transportation description of FM 40 considers it to be discontinuous at rather than concurrent with SH 207.) (52.328 km)
- Existed: April 29, 1942–present

Farm to Market Road 40 (FM 40) is located in Lubbock and Crosby counties. It runs from FM 1729 to FM 651. There are concurrencies with FM 378 and SH 207.

FM 40 was designated on April 29, 1942, from US 62 and US 82 at Lubbock to Acuff. On December 29, 1949, the road was extended east to FM 378, replacing FM 1526. On March 24, 1958, the road was extended to FM 651, replacing FM 1309 and FM 1308 and creating concurrencies with FM 122 (now SH 207) and FM 378. On June 27, 1995, the section from US 62 to FM 1729 was redesignated Urban Road 40 (UR 40). The designation of this section reverted to FM 40 with the elimination of the Urban Road system on November 15, 2018.

In 2023, the segment of FM 40 between CR 3300 and CR 3800 via Acuff was designated The Maines Brothers Band Highway.

== FM 41 ==
Farm to Market Road 41
- Location: Hockley and Lubbock counties
- Length: 48.321 mi (77.765 km)
- Existed: April 29, 1942–present

Farm to Market Road 41 (FM 41) is located in Hockley and Lubbock counties. The road begins from FM 303 southeast of Sundown and turns about 48 miles (77 km) eastward bypassing Ropesville and Slide before eventually returning to Bus. US 84 in Slaton. Originally, the route went from a junction of US 87 south of Lubbock to Slide. On June 25, 1945, the highway was extended east to 5.0 miles (8.0 km) miles west of Slaton and west from Slide to the Hockley County line. On December 17, 1952, FM 41 was extended west to SH 51 (now US 385). On February 24, 1953, the road was extended west to FM 300 (now FM 303), replacing FM 1174. On October 28, 1953, 4.8 miles (7.7 km) east to US 84 (later Loop 251, now Bus. US 84) were added, and the highway reached its present length.

== RM 42 ==
Ranch to Market Road 42
- Location: Menard and McCulloch counties
- Length: 30.8 mi (49.6 km)
- Existed: April 29, 1942–June 30, 1977 (Note: RM 42 was originally designated as FM 42 from 1948 to 1959.)

Ranch to Market Road 42 (RM 42), originally Farm to Market Road 42 (FM 42), was located in Menard and McCulloch counties.

FM 42 was designated on April 29, 1942, from Brady southwest 8.0 miles (12.9 km) to a point 1 mile (1.6 km) north of Calf Creek. On January 18, 1946, the road was shortened 1.8 miles (2.9 km) to end at Davis School. On November 23, 1948, FM 42 was extended west 5.2 miles (8.4 km) to a point 2.5 miles (4.0 km) miles north of Calf Creek. On July 21, 1949, the road was extended west to US 83, replacing FM 379. On October 1, 1956, the route's designation was changed to RM 42. RM 42 was cancelled on June 30, 1977, and became part of US 190 as that route was extended westward from Brady.

== FM 43 ==
Farm to Market Road 43
- Location: Nueces County
- Length: 10.791 mi (17.366 km)
- Existed: May 23, 1951–present

Farm to Market Road 43 (FM 43) is located in Nueces County. The highway runs from SH 358 southwest and west to FM 665.

FM 43 was designated on May 23, 1951, from SH 286 through London School to FM 665. On June 1, 1965, the road was extended east and northeast to SH 357. On July 11, 1968, FM 43 was extended northeast to SH 358. On June 27, 1995, the section from SH 358 to SH 357 was redesignated Urban Road 43 (UR 43). The designation of this section reverted to FM 43 with the elimination of the Urban Road system on November 15, 2018.

Junction list

The entire route is in Nueces County.

Location	mi	km	Destinations	Notes
	0.0	0.0	FM 665 / FM 2444 east	
	3.2	5.1	FM 763 north	
	6.0	9.7	SH 286 – Corpus Christi, Chapman Ranch	Interchange
Corpus Christi	9.0	14.5	SH 357 (Saratoga Boulevard)	Access to Christus Spohn Hospital
Corpus Christi	10.8	17.4	SH 358 (South Padre Island Drive)	Interchange
1.000 mi = 1.609 km; 1.000 km = 0.621 mi

=== FM 43/RM 43 (1942) ===
Ranch to Market Road 43
- Location: Menard and Schleicher counties
- Existed: April 29, 1942 (Note: RM 43 was originally designated as FM 43 from 1942 to 1945.)–March 17, 1948

The original FM 43 was formed on April 29, 1942, from US 83 near Menard through Mission San Saba to an existing roadway north of the San Saba River as a replacement of a portion of SH 151. On June 11, 1945, FM 43 was redesignated Ranch to Market Road 43 (RM 43) and a section from Eldorado to the Menard County line was designated, creating a gap. On June 20, 1945, the gap was closed. RM 43 was cancelled on March 17, 1948, and reassigned back to SH 151 (now US 190 and SH 29).

== FM 44 ==
Farm to Market Road 44
- Location: Red River and Bowie counties
- Length: 36.789 mi (59.206 km)
- Existed: April 29, 1942–present

Farm to Market Road 44 (FM 44) is located in Red River and Bowie counties. The highway runs from FM 114 south, east, and southeast to FM 561.

FM 44 was designated on April 29, 1942, from US 82 near Annona south 8.3 miles (13.4 km) to Boxelder, On May 19, 1942, it replaced Spur 23 from US 82 to Annona (this section was formerly SH 180 and later SH 5 Spur). On December 18, 1951, it was extended 4.3 miles (6.9 km) southeastward to a road intersection. On November 21, 1956, it was extended to FM 911 in Lydia. On February 13, 1958, it was extended east over a section of FM 561 to what was then FM 1996 (which became part of FM 561 that day) west of Siloam. On October 31, 1958, FM 44 was extended north to FM 114.

== FM 45 ==
Farm to Market Road 45
- Location: Brown, Mills, and San Saba counties
- Length: 30.705 mi (49.415 km)
- Existed: April 29, 1942–present

Farm to Market Road 45 (FM 45) runs from US 190 in Richland Springs north to US 377 about 5 miles (8.0 km) south of Brownwood. FM 45 forms a portion of the partial beltway that goes around the southeast side of Brownwood (the rest is formed by FM 2126).

FM 45 starts at US 190 about 14.7 miles (23.7 km) west of San Saba and heads northbound through Richland Springs to Main Ave. where the road briefly turns east for one block before continuing northbound. After exiting Richland Springs, FM 45 traverses the rural landscape with a daytime speed limit of 70 MPH. Halfway to Brownwood, FM 45 crosses the Colorado River from San Saba County into Brown County. At its junction with FM 2126, FM 45 continues west to US 377 with a speed limit of 65 MPH.

FM 45 provides Brownwood with a direct link to Richland Springs and San Saba (and vice versa). The highway shortens the trip between Brownwood and Richland Springs from 54 miles (87 km) (going through Brady) to 34 miles (55 km).

Before Farm to Market Roads were built, one of the first bridges across the Colorado River in this area is the Regency Bridge. A historical marker was erected by the Texas Historical Commission at the junction of FM 45 and FM 574 that describes the bridge.

FM 45 was designated on April 29, 1942, from US 190 north 7.0 miles (11.3 km) to the Locker Road. On July 13, 1945, it was extended north 2.3 miles (3.7 km) to a road intersection. On November 23, 1948, it was extended north 2.4 miles (3.9 km) to near the Colorado River. On January 22, 1953, FM 45 was extended north to the Mills County line. On February 6, 1953, FM 45 was extended north and west to US 377, replacing FM 1474. On October 29, 1954, it was extended south from the old location of US 190 to the new location of US 190.

== FM 46 ==
Farm to Market Road 46
- Location: Falls and Robertson counties
- Length: 34.035 mi (54.774 km)
- Existed: April 29, 1942–present

Farm to Market Road 46 (FM 46) is located in Falls and Robertson counties. It runs from SH 6 west of Bremond to SH OSR in Wheelock.

FM 46 was designated on April 29, 1942, from SH OSR northward 3.2 miles (5.1 km) to 1 mile (1.6 km) north of Wheelock, replacing part of SH 255. On November 20, 1951, FM 46 was extended north to US 79 in Franklin. On May 15, 1954, FM 46 was extended to SH 14 in Bremond (the original endpoint of SH 255), replacing FM 392. On September 26, 1967, FM 46 was extended north to new location SH 6 over old location SH 6. On August 31, 1971, FM 46 was rerouted over part of FM 2293, removing the break at SH 14.

== FM 47 ==
Farm to Market Road 47
- Location: Rains and Van Zandt counties
- Length: 40.582 mi (65.310 km)
- Existed: April 29, 1942–present

Farm to Market Road 47 (FM 47) is located in Rains and Van Zandt counties. It runs from SH 198 to US 69 in Point.

FM 47 was designated on April 29, 1942, from US 80 in Wills Point north 5.0 miles (8.0 km) to Clifton. On January 11, 1945, FM 47 was extended south to Scott. On June 11, 1945, FM 47 was extended south to SH 243. On October 29, 1948, FM 47 was extended south to SH 198. On May 23, 1951, FM 47 was extended northeast 3.6 miles (5.8 km). On November 27, 1953 (connecting section designated October 28), FM 47 was extended north to US 69, replacing a portion of FM 514. In 1975, FM 47 was realigned (the old route is now Rains County Road 1430)

== FM 48 ==
Farm to Market Road 48
- Location: Hemphill and Wheeler counties
- Length: 8.708 mi (14.014 km)
- Existed: April 29, 1942–present

Farm to Market Road 48 (FM 48) is located in Hemphill and Wheeler counties. It runs from SH 152 in Mobeetie (also called Old Mobeetie) to FM 1268.

FM 48 was designated on April 29, 1942, from SH 152 north 1.3 miles (2.1 km) to New Mobeetie. On May 19, 1942, it was extended south 0.4 miles (0.64 km) to Mobeetie, replacing Spur 41. On November 23, 1948, FM 48 was extended eastward 0.6 miles (0.97 km). On May 26, 1949, FM 48 was extended north and west 2.3 miles (3.7 km) to a road intersection, and the old route was changed to a spur connection. On August 7, 1951, the spur connection was transferred to FM 1046. On December 17, 1952, FM 48 was extended north to FM 1268.

The closing scene of the 2000 film Cast Away was filmed at the intersection of FM 48 and FM 1268.

== FM 49 ==
Farm to Market Road 49
- Location: Wood and Upshur counties
- Length: 33.674 mi (54.193 km)
- Existed: April 29, 1942–present

Farm to Market Road 49 (FM 49) is located in Wood and Upshur counties. It runs from US 69 in Mineola, northeast and then east via Hainesville and Pine Mills, to SH 154 on the western edge of Gilmer.

FM 49 was designated on April 29, 1942, from US 69 about 5.0 miles (8.0 km) northeast to near Lake Fork Creek. It was extended to Hainesville on June 11, 1945, and to an intersection with FM 14 in Pine Mills on December 17, 1947. FM 49 was extended to a road intersection near Big Sandy Creek, 3.6 miles (5.8 km) east of FM 14, on November 20, 1951, and into Upshur County to FM 1002 on August 24, 1955. It was extended to former FM 554 on November 14, 1959. FM 554 was cancelled on August 3, 1971, with the section from FM 49 to SH 154 was transferred to FM 49 (the remainder was transferred to FM 1795).

== FM 50 ==
Farm to Market Road 50
- Location: Washington, Burleson, Brazos, and Robertson counties
- Length: 51.378 mi (82.685 km)
- Existed: April 29, 1942–present

Farm to Market Road 50 (FM 50) is a 53-mile (85 km) route in Washington, Burleson, Brazos, and Robertson counties. It begins at SH 105 near Brenham and runs north through Independence to US 79/US 190 near Hearne. It has a brief concurrency with SH 21 along a bridge crossing the Brazos River.

The road was designated on April 29, 1942, along the portion of the present route north of SH 21. On May 20, 1942, the road was extended through Snook to SH 36 at Lyons, replacing a portion of SH 230 (of which the remainder became part of the then-new FM 60). On August 24, 1943, FM 50 was extended south to SH 211 in Independence. On October 6, 1943, FM 50 was extended south to SH 90, replacing most of SH 211. The remainder of SH 211 became Spur 197, and is now FM 390 and FM Spur 390. The section of FM 50 from east of Snook to SH 36 was transferred to FM 60.

== FM 51 ==
Farm to Market Road 51
- Location: Somervell, Hood, Parker, Wise, Denton, and Cooke counties
- Length: 114.986 mi (185.052 km)
- Existed: April 29, 1942–present

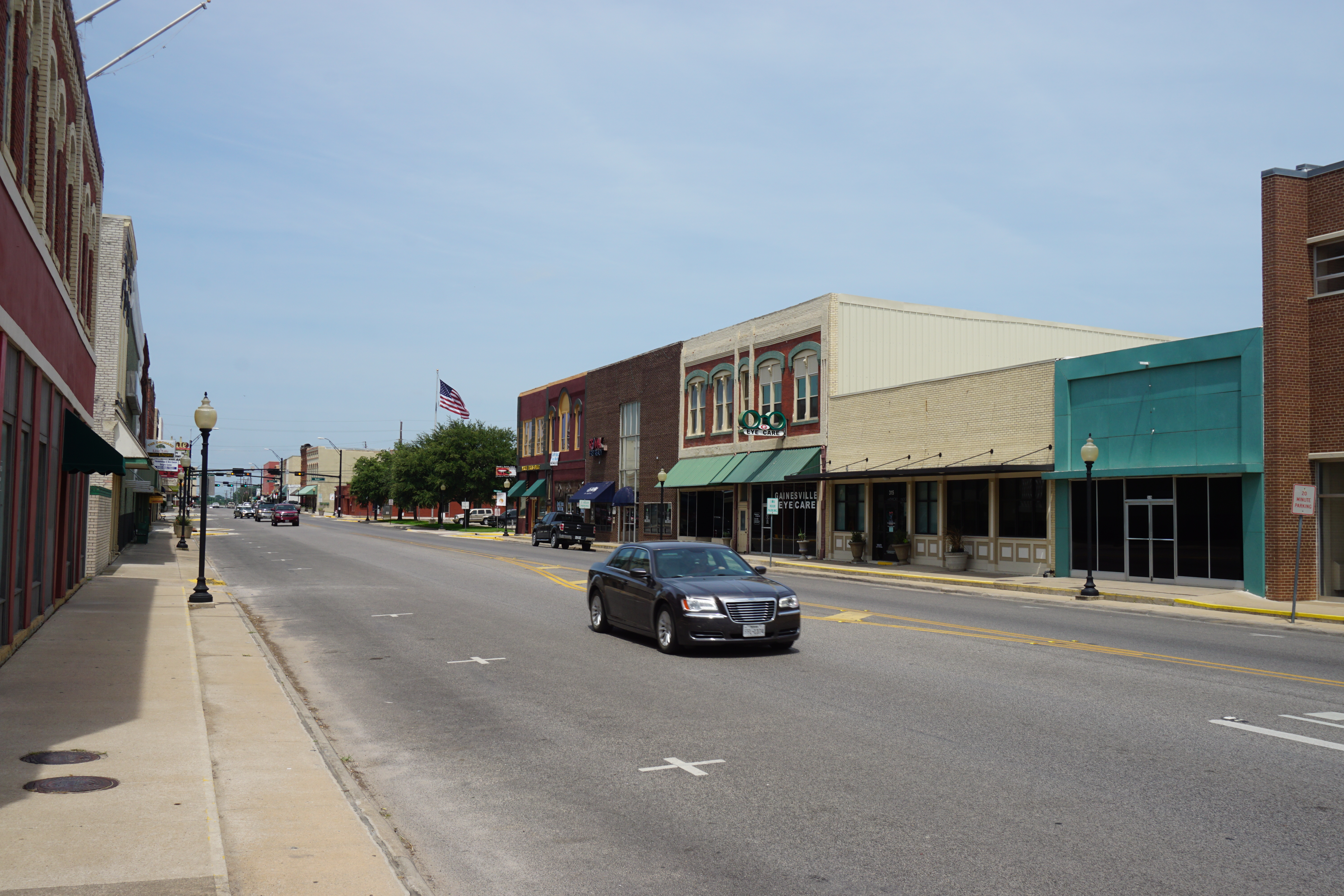
FM 51, as East California Street, in Gainesville

Farm to Market Road 51 (FM 51) runs from US 67 in Somervell County north and east to I-35 in Gainesville. Skirting the northwestern fringes of the Dallas-Fort Worth Metroplex, it is available as a more scenic and less-congested shortcut between I-20 west of Weatherford and I-35 north of Gainesville.

The route north of Decatur was designated as SH 169 in 1932, but was extended to Weatherford and was part of an extended SH 89 until 1939. FM 51 was designated on April 29, 1942, from Gainesville to Era. On May 19 of that year, three more sections were added: one from Decatur northeast 4.8 miles (7.7 km) to the Slidell Road, one from SH 114 to Springtown, and one from Weatherford north 4.0 miles (6.4 km). On August 22, 1944, it was extended from 4.0 miles (6.4 km) north of Weatherford to Springtown and from 4.8 miles (7.7 km) northeast of Decatur to the Denton–Wise county line, closing one gap and partially closing another. On June 5, 1945, another section was added from the Parker–Hood county line to Granbury. Seven days later, FM 51 was extended from Weatherford to the Parker–Hood county line, connecting the sections. On February 14, 1947, it was extended from SH 114 to Decatur, closing another gap. On April 28, 1949, it was extended from the Denton–Wise county line to Era, closing the last gap. On September 28 in that year, it was extended east from the old location of US 77 to the new location of US 77; two other sections of old US 77 was replaced by FM 1306 and FM 1307. On February 6, 1953, it was extended southwest to a road intersection 4.7 miles (7.6 km) southwest of Granbury, replacing FM 1657 on that route. On August 24, 1955, it was extended southwest to FM 201 (now FM 56). On November 23, 1959, it was extended east from US 77 along the old location of US 82 to US 82. On December 20, 1984, when the district combined several farm to market roads with others, FM 51 was extended southwest to US 67, replacing FM 204. In the same order, FM 56 replaced FM 201. Part of the road designated FM 204 was designated as FM 2223.

== FM 52 ==
Farm to Market Road 52
- Location: Parker and Palo Pinto counties
- Length: 14.404 mi (23.181 km)
- Existed: May 20, 1942–present

Farm to Market Road 52 (FM 52) is located in Parker and Palo Pinto counties. It runs from SH 254 north to Oran, east to Whitt, and south to FM 1885.

FM 52 was designated on May 20, 1942, from Oran east across US 281 to Whitt. On December 2, 1953, FM 52 was extended south from Oran to SH 254. On August 24, 1955, FM 52 was extended southeast from Whitt to FM 1885.

== FM 53 ==
Farm to Market Road 53
- Location: Coleman, Runnels, Taylor, and Nolan counties
- Existed: May 20, 1942–August 8, 1988

Farm to Market Road 53 (FM 53) was located in Coleman, Runnels, Taylor, and Nolan counties. No highway currently uses the FM 53 designation.

FM 53 was designated on May 20, 1942, from SH 70, 13.0 miles (20.9 km) miles south of Sweetwater, southeast to SH 158 (now US 277). On June 22, 1944, FM 53 was extended east to Crews, replacing FM 70. Another section of FM 53 was added from Coleman to the New Central School, replacing FM 24. This created a gap in the route. On October 29, 1948, the western section was extended east to the Runnels–Coleman county line. On November 2, 1948, the eastern section was extended northwest to Glen Cove. On July 15, 1949, the eastern section extended west to 1.8 miles (2.9 km) northwest of Glen Cove. On July 25, 1950, it was extended from the Coleman County line to 1.8 miles (2.9 km) northwest of Glen Cove, closing the gap. On September 21, 1965, it was relocated in Winters, removing a concurrency with US 83; the old route became Loop 438. On December 1, 1969, it was extended east over the old location of US 84 to the new location of US 84, creating a concurrency with SH 206. FM 53 was cancelled on May 16, 1988, and transferred to SH 153.

== FM 54 ==
Farm to Market Road 54
- Location: Bailey, Lamb, Hale, and Floyd counties
- Length: 101.164 mi (162.808 km)
- Existed: May 20, 1942–present

Farm to Market Road 54 (FM 54) is located in Bailey, Lamb, Hale, and Floyd counties. It begins at the New Mexico state line as a continuation of NM 321 and runs east to Enochs, where it intersects SH 214. The highway turns north and is briefly concurrent with FM 37. After leaving Bula and crossing the Lamb County line, the highway intersects US 84 in Littlefield, where it also intersects US 385 and Loop 430. FM 54 intersects FM 1072 and continues east to an intersection with FM 168 in Spade. After entering Hale County, it shares a brief concurrency with FM 179. FM 54 then crosses the I-27/US 87 freeway. It intersects FM 400 and turns northeast in Petersburg at FM 789 before entering Floyd County. FM 54 ends at SH 207/US 62 south of Floydada.

FM 54 was designated on May 20, 1942, from US 87 north of Abernathy to Petersburg as a restoration of part of SH 278. On May 18, 1944, it was extended to include a section from Spade via Littlefield to the Bailey County line, creating a gap. On June 4, 1945, a section from SH 207 to the Floyd–Hale county line was added, creating another gap. On June 16 of that year, one segment was extended west from the Lamb–Bailey county line to SH 214, and on July 9 of that year, one segment was extended west from US 87 to the Hale–Lamb county line. On June 4, 1946, it was extended from the Floyd–Hale county line to Petersburg, closing one gap. On January 22, 1947, a spur connection was added in Petersburg. On November 18, 1947, it was extended from the Hale–Lamb county line to Spade, closing the remaining gap. FM 54 now matched the entirety of the former route of SH 278. On December 16, 1948, it was extended west 8 miles (13 km) miles from SH 214. On July 14, 1949, it was extended west to the New Mexico state line.

== FM 55 ==
Farm to Market Road 55
- Location: Ellis and Navarro counties
- Length: 35.214 mi (56.671 km)
- Existed: May 19, 1942–present

Farm to Market Road 55 (FM 55) is located in Ellis and Navarro counties. It runs from US 77 near Waxahachie to FM 709 south of Purdon.

FM 55 was designated on May 19, 1942, from SH 31 to Purdon. On July 27, 1948, FM 55 was extended to SH 22, replacing FM 634. On November 28, 1958, FM 55 was extended to the Navarro–Ellis county line, replacing FM 1782. On May 2, 1962, FM 55 was extended north to SH 34. On June 1, 1962, FM 55 was extended north to US 77, replacing FM 1492. On May 7, 1974, FM 55 was extended south to FM 709.

== FM 56 ==
Farm to Market Road 56
- Location: Bosque, Somervell, and Hood counties
- Length: 77.908 mi (125.381 km)
- Existed: May 19, 1942–present

Farm to Market Road 56 (FM 56) is located in Bosque, Somervell, and Hood counties.

FM 56 was designated on May 19, 1942, from SH 317 and US 84 in McGregor north to Crawford. Soon after that, FM 56 was extended north to SH 67 (this section became part of SH 6 on September 26, 1945) Valley Mills. On June 11, 1945, FM 56 was extended north to Cayote (also called Coyote). On October 29, 1947, the section of FM 56 from Valley Mills to McGregor was transferred to SH 317, shortening FM 56 to be a route from Valley Mills to Cayote. On July 14, 1949, FM 56 was extended north to SH 22. On October 18, 1954, FM 56 was extended north to FM 1859 in Kopperl, and a section of FM 1859 from Kopperl to SH 174 was transferred to FM 56. On October 31, 1957, FM 56 was extended northward to the end of FM 1992 at Brazos Point. On January 15, 1960, FM 56 was extended to SH 144, replacing all of FM 1992 and part of FM 202 north of what was then FM 1992. On December 20, 1984, when the district combined several farm to market roads with others, FM 56 was extended to a county road northwest of US 377, replacing FM 201.

== FM 57 ==
Farm to Market Road 57
- Location: Jones and Fisher counties
- Length: 29.553 mi (47.561 km)
- Existed: May 19, 1942–present

Farm to Market Road 57 (FM 57) is located in Jones and Fisher counties. It runs from Hamlin to FM 419.

FM 57 was designated on May 19, 1942, from Hamlin southwest to the Fisher County line. On May 18, 1944, the road was extended to Sylvester. On December 16, 1948, a section from Sylvester to Longworth was added, and the road was extended to SH 70, replacing FM 609. On September 20, 1961, the road was extended to FM 419.

== FM 58 ==
Farm to Market Road 58
- Location: Angelina County
- Length: 12.097 mi (19.468 km)
- Existed: May 19, 1942–present

Farm to Market Road 58 (FM 58) is located in Angelina County. It runs from US 69 southeast of Lufkin to FM 1818.

FM 58 was designated on May 19, 1942, from US 59 and Harmony Hill Drive south of Lufkin to US 69 southeast of Lufkin, and from Harmony Hill Drive to a point 10.2 miles (16.4 km) south as a replacement for SH 299. On March 20, 1946, the road was extended south to a county road (current FM 1818). On May 23, 1951, FM 58 was extended west to US 59 at Diboll. The same day a 1.1-mile (1.8 km) section of FM 58 was renumbered FM 1877. On August 11, 1966, the section from FM 1818 to US 59 was transferred to FM 1818.

== FM 59 ==
Farm to Market Road 59
- Location: Henderson and Anderson counties
- Length: 18.579 mi (29.900 km)
- Existed: May 19, 1942–present

Farm to Market Road 59 (FM 59) is located in Henderson and Anderson counties. The road is 18.6 miles (29.9 km) long.

The road begins at an intersection with SH 19 in Athens. From there, it goes southwest, passing through Cross Roads. The southern terminus is at US 287 in Cayuga. FM 59 was designated on May 19, 1942, from SH 19 in Athens to Cross Roads. On June 11, 1945, it was extended to Cayuga. This was part of SH 212 before 1939.

== FM 60 ==
Farm to Market Road 60
- Location: Burleson and Brazos counties
- Length: 43.688 mi (70.309 km)
- Existed: May 20, 1942–present

Farm to Market Road 60 (FM 60) runs from SH 21, 6 miles (9.7 km) southwest of Caldwell, southeastward to SH 36 at Lyons; and from another point on SH 36 at Lyons, northeastward to FM 158 at Bryan. In Brazos County, it is also known as Raymond Stotzer Pkwy west of FM 2154 and University Drive east of FM 2154.

FM 60 was designated on May 20, 1942, from SH 6 (now a business route) to a point near the eastern bank of the Brazos River, replacing a portion of SH 230. On August 24, 1943, a second section was created from FM 50 4 miles (6.4 km) east of Snook east to the State Experimental Sub Station, creating a gap. On October 6 in that year, the western section was extended to SH 36 near Lyons, replacing a section of FM 50. On August 1, 1944, FM 60 was extended from a point near the eastern bank of the Brazos River to the State Experimental Sub Station, closing the gap. On October 31, 1957, it was extended east to FM 158. On December 15, 1960, the section from SH 6 (now a business route) to FM 158 was transferred to SH 30. On June 2, 1967, FM 60 was extended southwest 4.0 miles (6.4 km) from SH 36. On February 29, 1968, FM 60 was extended from the old location of SH 6 to the new location of SH 6. On November 26, 1969, FM 60 was extended northwest 3.3 miles (5.3 km) to FM 111. On December 19, 1969, FM 60 was extended northwest to SH 21, replacing FM 111. FM 111 was instead reassigned to an extension of its former spur connection, then numbered FM 2618. On May 23, 1978, it was extended northeast from SH 6 to FM 158. On June 27, 1995, the section from SH 47 to FM 158 was redesignated Urban Road 60 (UR 60). The designation reverted to FM 60 with the elimination of the Urban Road system on November 15, 2018.

Junction list

County	Location	mi	km	Destinations	Notes
Burleson		0.00	0.00	SH 21 – Bastrop, Caldwell	Western terminus
Burleson	Deanville	2.5	4.0	FM 111	
Burleson		8.1	13.0	FM 976 east – Frenstat	
Burleson		10.7	17.2	PR 57 south – Lake Somerville	
Burleson		14.0	22.5	RE 4 east – Lake Somerville	
Burleson	Lyons	17.8	28.6	SH 36 north – Caldwell	West end of SH 36 overlap
Burleson	Lyons	18.2	29.3	SH 36 south – Somerville	East end of SH 36 overlap
Burleson		23.7	38.1	FM 3058 west – Caldwell	
Burleson		26.6	42.8	FM 2039 north	
Burleson	Snook	28.3	45.5	FM 2155 south	
Burleson		31.3	50.4	FM 50 – Brenham	
Brazos	College Station	36.7	59.1	SH 47 north – Texas A&M University System RELLIS Campus	Interchange; no eastbound exit
Brazos	College Station	37.3	60.0	Turkey Creek Road – Easterwood Airport	Interchange
Brazos	College Station	37.9	61.0	FM 2818 (Harvey Mitchell Parkway)	Diverging diamond interchange
Brazos	College Station	39.4	63.4	FM 2154 (Welborn Road)	Interchange
Brazos	College Station	40.0	64.4	SH 308 north (South College Avenue) / Bizzell Street	
Brazos	College Station	40.5	65.2	Bus. SH 6 (Texas Avenue) – Texas A&M University	
Brazos	College Station	42.2	67.9	SH 6 (South Earl Rudder Freeway)	
Brazos	College Station	44.1	71.0	FM 158 (Boonville Road) / East University Drive	Eastern terminus; road continues as East University Drive
1.000 mi = 1.609 km; 1.000 km = 0.621 mi: Concurrency terminus; Incomplete access

== FM 61 ==
Farm to Market Road 61
- Location: Young County
- Length: 11.749 mi (18.908 km)
- Existed: June 23, 1942–present

Farm to Market Road 61 (FM 61) runs from US 380 just south of Newcastle southeastward through Fort Belknap to SH 67 in Graham.

FM 61 was designated on June 23, 1942, from SH 24 (now US 380) in Graham, northward to Loving. On June 18, 1945, it was extended north to the Archer County line. Seven days later, it was extended north to US 281. On November 21, 1956, FM 61 was extended west 4.5 miles (7.2 km) from SH 24. On November 24, 1959, it was extended west to SH 251 in Fort Belknap. On January 31, 1969, the section of FM 61 from US 380 in Graham northward to US 281 was transferred to SH 16. On May 6, 1974, one section in Graham was transferred to relocated SH 67. On February 23, 1993, it was extended north to US 380 south of Newcastle, replacing a section of SH 251.

== FM 62 ==
Farm to Market Road 62
- Location: Polk County
- Length: 9.738 mi (15.672 km)
- Existed: June 23, 1942–present

Farm to Market Road 62 (FM 62) is located in Polk County. It runs from US 59 in Camden to US 287.

FM 62 was designated on June 23, 1942, from US 59 to Camden. On May 23, 1951, it was extended to Hortense. On July 27, 1951, the road from Camden to Hortense was redesignated as FM 646 (FM 646 was short-lived, as it became part of FM 942 on January 14, 1952), truncating FM 62 back to its previous terminus at Camden. On May 2, 1962, FM 62 was extended east to US 287.

== FM 63 ==
Farm to Market Road 63
- Location: Live Oak and McMullen counties
- Length: 38.2 mi (61.5 km)
- Existed: June 23, 1942–December 15, 1960

Farm to Market Road 63 (FM 63) was located in Live Oak and McMullen counties. At its longest, it was 38.2 miles (61.5 km) in length.

FM 63 was formed from a section of SH 72 on June 23, 1942, beginning at Three Rivers and ending near Calliham. On July 9, 1945, it was extended to Tilden. On May 22, 1947, it was extended to Fowlerton. FM 63 was cancelled on December 15, 1960, and transferred back to SH 72.

== FM 64 ==
Farm to Market Road 64
- Location: Fannin and Delta counties
- Length: 18.313 mi (29.472 km)
- Existed: June 23, 1942–present

Farm to Market Road 64 (FM 64) is a 18.3-mile (29.5 km) route in Fannin and Delta counties. It runs from SH 34 in Ladonia, passing through Pecan Gap and Antioch, to Bus. SH 24 in Cooper. The road also has major intersections with SH 24 in Cooper and several other Farm to Market Roads. FM 64 was designated in 1942, replacing SH 247.

FM 64 begins at SH 34 on the northern edge of Ladonia in Fannin County. The road proceeds to the east away from town and is joined from the north by FM 904 before the combined route enters Pecan Gap and Delta County. On the west side of Pecan Gap, FM 904 separates turning to the south. On the east side of town at the intersection with FM 128, FM 64 turns to the south and continues away from town.

At the intersection with FM 1532, FM 64 turns to the east. The road intersects FM 1528 from the south, then FM 3388 and FM 1530 to the north before entering Cooper from the northwest. The road then intersects SH 24 which bypasses central Cooper on the northwest, and ends at the state highway's business route through town.

The road encounters terrain of gentle relief for its entire length.

FM 64 was designated as an extension of SH 154 on February 8, 1933. This section of SH 154 was decommissioned on July 15, 1935, but was restored on December 22, 1936. On August 4, 1937, SH 154 was rerouted over old SH 247, and this section was redesignated as new SH 247. The highway was described until June 23, 1942, as a route from Ladonia through Cooper to a point on SH 154 near the South Sulphur River. That year, SH 247 was removed from the highway system, and FM 64 was created over the former SH 247 from a point approximately 4.5 miles (7.2 km) west of Cooper to SH 154. The road was extended westward to FM 128 at Pecan Gap On February 28, 1945, and on February 21, 1946, the section from 4.5 miles (7.2 km) west of Cooper to Pecan Gap was designated as a state highway, SH 247, to be marked for information and guidance of the traveling public as a Farm to Market Road. On November 23, 1948, the portion of the current road between SH 34 in Ladonia and Pecan Gap was added to FM 128 as an extension. The portion of FM 128 between Ladonia and Pecan Gap was reassigned as an extension to FM 64 on February 26, 1949. This extended FM 64 along the entire length of the former SH 247. On May 18, 1953, the section from 4.5 miles (7.2 km) west of Cooper to Pecan Gap was no longer designated as SH 247.

SH 154 north of Sulphur Springs was reassigned as part of SH 19 on August 24, 1960, but was extended over SH 19 and FM 64 to SH 24 in Cooper on August 28 of the following year terminating FM 64 at SH 24. In 1968, SH 24 in Cooper was relocated over its present bypass, and its original route through town where FM 64 ends was signed as its business route. From 1971 to 2003, SH 34 where FM 64 begins was also part of SH 50.

== FM 65 ==
Farm to Market Road 65
- Location: Zavala and Dimmit counties
- Length: 13.368 mi (21.514 km)
- Existed: June 23, 1942–present

Farm to Market Road 65 (FM 65) is located in Zavala and Dimmit counties. It runs from US 83 south of Crystal City to I-35.

FM 65 was designated on June 23, 1942, from US 83 south of Crystal City to SH 85 west of Big Wells. On September 14, 1944, FM 65 was modified to end at US 83 north of Crystal City. On February 25, 2010, FM 65 was extended concurrent with SH 85 to I-35.

== FM 66 ==
Farm to Market Road 66
- Location: Ellis and Hill counties
- Length: 32.799 mi (52.785 km)
- Existed: June 23, 1942–present

Farm to Market Road 66 (FM 66) is located in Ellis and Hill counties. It runs from Mayfield to Waxahachie.

FM 66 was designated on June 23, 1942, from Itasca to Files Valley. This was designated as SH 325 from December 7, 1939, to February 20, 1940. On August 2, 1943, the road was extended to FM 74 at Maypearl. On August 23 of that year, the road was extended to Waxahachie, replacing FM 74. On June 18, 1945, the road was extended to Mayfield.

== FM 67 ==
Farm to Market Road 67
- Location: Hill County
- Length: 23.943 mi (38.533 km)
- Existed: June 23, 1942–present

Farm to Market Road 67 (FM 67) is located in Hill County. It runs from FM 933 in Blum to FM 66 at Elm Street in Itasca.

FM 67 was designated on June 23, 1942, from SH 171 at Covington to Blum. On March 26, 1953, FM 67 was extended east 0.2 miles (0.32 km) to new location SH 171. On October 27, 1956, FM 67 was extended north to SH 174, replacing Spur 248. On November 26, 1958, FM 67 was extended to FM 66 in Itasca, replacing FM 712 (connecting section designated October 31). On July 21, 1961, the section north of FM 933 was transferred to FM 933. On March 26, 1991, the section of FM 67 along Files Street and Wilkerson Street was given to the city of Itasca.

== FM 68 ==
Farm to Market Road 68
- Location: Fannin County
- Length: 9.042 mi (14.552 km)
- Existed: August 1, 1942–present

Farm to Market Road 68 (FM 68) is located in Fannin County. The road was designated on August 1, 1942, from a point on SH 78 north of Bailey through Gomer to a point on SH 34 at or near Whatley School as a replacement for SH 337.

== FM 69 ==
Farm to Market Road 69
- Location: Hopkins and Wood counties
- Length: 43.826 mi (70.531 km)
- Existed: September 22, 1942–present

Farm to Market Road 69 (FM 69) is located in Hopkins and Wood counties. It runs from 2 miles (3.2 km) north of FM 71 south to SH 37.

FM 69 was designated on September 22, 1942, from SH 37 south of Winnsboro west to Coke. On June 11, 1945, FM 69 was extended south back to SH 37. On November 21, 1956, FM 69 was extended east to SH 11. On December 21, 1959, the section of FM 69 east of what was then part of FM 1483 became part of FM 515 (along with part of FM 1483), and FM 69 was rerouted north to 2.0 miles (3.2 km) north of FM 71, replacing FM 2476 and part of FM 270 (the section of FM 270 east and north of FM 2476 became part of FM 269).

== FM 70 ==
Farm to Market Road 70
- Location: Jim Wells and Nueces counties
- Length: 61.227 mi (98.535 km)
- Existed: May 23, 1951–present

Farm to Market Road 70 (FM 70) is located in Jim Wells and Nueces counties. It runs from US 59 to SH 286 in Chapman Ranch.

FM 70 was designated on May 23, 1951, from SH 286 in Chapman Ranch to SH 44 in Agua Dulce. On November 20, 1951, FM 70 was extended north to the Nueces–Jim Wells county line. On December 18, 1951, FM 70 was extended northeast to FM 739 and County Road 103. On January 14, 1952, FM 70 was extended northwest to US 59, replacing FM 739.

=== FM 70 (1942) ===
Farm to Market Road 70
- Location: Nolan County
- Existed: September 22, 1942–June 22, 1944

A previous route numbered FM 70 was designated on September 22, 1942, from Crews via Winters to Wingate. FM 70 was cancelled on June 22, 1944, and became a portion of FM 53 (now SH 153).

== FM 71 ==
Farm to Market Road 71
- Location: Hunt, Delta, Hopkins, Franklin, Titus, and Morris counties
- Length: 72.307 mi (116.367 km)
- Existed: September 22, 1942–present

Farm to Market Road 71 (FM 71) is located in Hunt, Delta, Hopkins, Franklin, Titus, and Morris counties. It runs from SH 11 in Commerce to US 259. FM 71 was designated on November 24, 1942, from SH 154 (now SH 19) east to Sulphur Bluff. This was formerly SH 260 before 1939. On June 11, 1945, FM 71 was extended east via Hagansport and Talco to Wilkinson. On November 23, 1948, FM 71 was extended west to Emblem with a spur connection to Peerless added, replacing FM 276. On May 23, 1951, FM 71 was extended south to SH 11 at Ridgeway. On October 13, 1954, FM 71 was extended east to the Titus–Morris county line. On August 24, 1955, FM 71 was extended east to SH 26 (now US 259). On October 31, 1958, FM 71 was extended south from SH 11 to US 67 at Brashear. On September 27, 1960, the section south of Emblem was renumbered FM 2653, and FM 71 was rerouted west on a new alignment to FM 1531, and replaced a section of FM 1531 west to SH 11 in Commerce (later Loop 216, later Bus. SH 24, now Bus. SH 224).

== FM 72 ==
Farm to Market Road 72
- Location: Irion County
- Length: 1.19 mi (1.92 km)
- Existed: February 12, 1943–present

Farm to Market Road 72 (FM 72) is located in Irion County. It runs eastward from US 67 approximately 1.8 miles (2.9 km) north of Mertzon to near the Old Irion County Courthouse in Sherwood.

FM 72 was designated on February 12, 1943, along the current route.

== FM 73 ==
Farm to Market Road 73
- Location: Limestone County
- Length: 14.348 mi (23.091 km)
- Existed: February 12, 1943–present

Farm to Market Road 73 (FM 73) is located in Limestone County. It runs from 3.1 miles (5.0 km) northeast of SH 171 to US 84.

FM 73 was designated on February 12, 1943, from US 84 west of Prairie Hill to SH 171 in Coolidge. On May 5, 1966, FM 73 was extended northeast 3.1 miles (5.0 km). On October 3, 1966, FM 73 had a slight rerouting due to the relocation of SH 171 in Coolidge.

== FM 74 ==
Farm to Market Road 74
- Location: Cass County
- Length: 5.007 mi (8.058 km)
- Existed: May 23, 1951–present

Farm to Market Road 74 (FM 74) is located in Cass County. It was designated on May 23, 1951, from Loop 236 at Queen City east to FM 251, and from another point on FM 251 to FM 249 in Bloomburg.

=== FM 74 (1943) ===
Farm to Market Road 74
- Location: Ellis and Hill counties
- Existed: March 8, 1943–August 23, 1943

A previous route numbered FM 74 was designated in Ellis and Hill counties on March 8, 1943, connecting Waxahachie and Maypearl. FM 74 was cancelled on August 23, 1943, and became part of an extended FM 66.

== FM 75 ==
Farm to Market Road 75
- Location: Collin County
- Length: 3.05 mi (4.91 km)
- Existed: April 15, 1943–present

Farm to Market Road 75 (FM 75) is located in Collin County. The road begins at Monte Carlo Road in Princeton and runs north to FM 1827.

FM 75 was formed on April 15, 1943, from SH 24 (now US 380) along the former route of SH 145 to an intersection with former SH 24 as a replacement for State Spur 73. On November 24, 1959, the road was extended to FM 1827. On November 15, 1977, the southern terminus was redesignated as US 380. On February 28, 2019, the section of FM 75 from Monte Carlo Road to US 380 via Longneck Road, College Avenue, 2nd Street, McKinney Avenue, 3rd Street, Main Street, and 4th Street was given to the city of Princeton.

== FM 76 ==
Farm to Market Road 76
- Location: El Paso County
- Length: 29.417 mi (47.342 km)
- Existed: April 14, 1943–present

Farm to Market Road 76 (FM 76) is located in El Paso County. The road begins at SH 20 in the Ascarate district of El Paso and heads southeastward to Clint, passing Loop 375 in the process. The highway then intersects with FM 1281, and remains parallel to I-10. Once it reaches Fabens, the highway turns southwest and then southeast and ends at FM 3380 (former FM 1109) near the Mexican border. At designation on April 14, 1943, the road went from US 80 in Ascarate to a point near Ysleta. The highway was expanded on May 18, 1944, from Ysleta to Clint, and then again on July 9, 1945, from Clint to Fabens. On December 16, 1948, the road was expanded to a junction of FM 1109. On April 2, 1969, the highway was slightly modified due to the portion of US 80 being modified into SH 20. On June 27, 1995, the section of the highway from FM 1110 to SH 20 was redesignated Urban Road 76 (UR 76). The designation reverted to FM 76 with the elimination of the Urban Road system on November 15, 2018.

== FM 77 ==
Farm to Market Road 77
- Location: Gonzales County
- Length: 8.454 mi (13.605 km)
- Existed: August 2, 1943–present

Farm to Market Road 77 (FM 77) is located in Gonzales County. The road begins at US 87 east of Nixon, then runs northeast to Schoolland and then southeast to FM 108.

FM 77 was designated on August 2, 1943, from US 87 east of Nixon northeast to Schoolland. On July 14, 1949, the road was extended to FM 108.

== FM 78 ==
Farm to Market Road 78
- Location: Bexar and Guadalupe counties
- Length: 30.205 mi (48.610 km)
- Existed: August 3, 1943–present

Farm to Market Road 78 (FM 78) is located in Bexar and Guadalupe counties, connecting San Antonio and Seguin.

== FM 79 ==
Farm to Market Road 79
- Location: Fannin and Lamar counties
- Length: 26.925 mi (43.332 km)
- Existed: August 3, 1943–present

Farm to Market Road 79 (FM 79) is located in Fannin and Lamar counties. It runs from FM 100 to US 82.

FM 79 was designated on August 3, 1943, from US 82 northwest to Unity. On August 25, 1949, it was extended 8.0 miles (12.9 km) to the Fannin County line. On December 18, 1951, FM 79 was extended to its current terminus at FM 100.

== FM 80 ==
Farm to Market Road 80
- Location: Freestone and Limestone counties
- Length: 33.427 mi (53.796 km)
- Existed: August 3, 1943–present

Farm to Market Road 80 (FM 80) is located in Freestone and Limestone counties. It runs from FM 39 to SH 75 in Streetman.

FM 80 was designated on August 3, 1943, from US 84 (later Loop 255, now Bus. US 84) in Teague to SH 164 in Donie. On June 11, 1945, FM 80 was extended north to Kirvin. On July 15, 1948, Spur 156, connecting FM 80 to the Woodland Memorial Cemetery, became part of FM 80, and the old route became a spur connection. On July 21, 1949, FM 80 was extended south 3.0 miles (4.8 km) from Donie. That same day, the spur became part of FM 1449. On July 25, 1950, FM 80 was extended south to FM 39. On November 16, 1956, the section from Kirvin to the Woodland Memorial Cemetery became part of new FM 1449, while old FM 1449 from Kirvin to US 75 (now SH 75) in Streetman became part of FM 80.

== FM 81 ==
Farm to Market Road 81
- Location: Karnes and Goliad counties
- Length: 38.099 mi (61.314 km)
- Existed: August 23, 1943–present

Farm to Market Road 81 (FM 81) is located in Karnes and Goliad counties. It runs from FM 1144 north, east, and south to SH 239 at Charco.

FM 81 was designated on August 23, 1943, from SH 239 at Charco to SH 72 at Runge. On July 9, 1945, FM 81 was extended to SH 80 at Helena. On January 6, 1950, FM 81 was extended to 5.0 miles (8.0 km) south of Hobson at what would later be FM 1144, replacing FM 886 and FM 744.

== FM 82 ==
Farm to Market Road 82
- Location: Newton and Jasper counties
- Length: 10.328 mi (16.621 km)
- Existed: May 23, 1951–present

Farm to Market Road 82 (FM 82) is located in Newton and Jasper counties. It runs from FM 1004 west of US 87 to 4.5 miles (7.2 km) west of US 96.

FM 82 was designated on May 23, 1951, from FM 1004 near SH 87 northwest 4.0 miles (6.4 km) to a road intersection. On November 20, 1951, FM 82 was extended west to US 96. On June 1, 1965, FM 82 was extended west 4.5 miles (7.2 km) to its current end.

=== FM 82 (1943) ===
Farm to Market Road 82
- Location: Denton County
- Existed: September 6, 1943–December 16, 1943

A previous route numbered FM 82 was designated on September 6, 1943, from Bonham via Randolph to Trenton. The section from Randolph to Bonham was formerly SH 263. FM 82 became a portion of SH 121 on December 16, 1943.

== FM 83 ==
Farm to Market Road 83
- Location: San Augustine and Sabine counties
- Length: 36.622 mi (58.937 km)
- Existed: September 7, 1943–present

Farm to Market Road 83 (FM 83) is located in San Augustine and Sabine counties. It connects SH 147 to Lows Creek Marina west of the Louisiana state line.

FM 83 was designated on September 7, 1943, from Hemphill to East Mayfield. On June 11, 1945, it was extended west to US 96 near Pineland. On May 3, 1961, FM 83 was extended west to SH 147 and east to a road intersection, replacing FM 2379 and FM 1965. On July 1, 1964, FM 83 was rerouted to use Flag Pole Road instead of Maple Street from US 96 to FM 1. On June 2, 1967, FM 83 was extended east 2.5 miles (4.0 km). On September 26, 1979, FM 83 was extended east 0.1 miles (0.16 km) to Lows Creek Marina.

== FM 84 ==
Farm to Market Road 84
- Location: Grayson County
- Length: 8.861 mi (14.260 km)
- Existed: October 6, 1943–present

Farm to Market Road 84 (FM 84) is located in Grayson County. The 8.9-mile (14.3 km) route connects US 75 to Lake Texoma.

FM 84 was designated on October 6, 1943, replacing a portion of SH 91. On June 27, 1995, the route was redesignated Urban Road 84 (UR 84). The designation reverted to FM 84 with the elimination of the Urban Road system on November 15, 2018.

Junction list

The entire route is in Grayson County.

Location	mi	km	Destinations	Notes
	0.0	0.0	Texoma Drive	
Denison	3.6	5.8	FM 406 west	
Denison	5.6	9.0	US 75 – Durant, Sherman	US 75 exit 70
Denison	7.4	11.9	SH 91 – Denison Dam, Denison	
Denison	8.9	14.3	US 69 – Durant, Denison	
1.000 mi = 1.609 km; 1.000 km = 0.621 mi

== FM 85 ==
Farm to Market Road 85
- Location: Ellis, Navarro, and Henderson counties
- Length: 24.587 mi (39.569 km)
- Existed: October 6, 1943–present

Farm to Market Road 85 (FM 85) is located in Ellis, Navarro, and Henderson counties. It runs from I-45 and US 287 in Ennis to SH 274.

FM 85 was designated on October 6, 1943, from Mabank to SH 274. On June 28, 1945, a section from SH 198 to Prairieville was added, creating a concurrency with SH 198. On July 14, 1949, a section from FM 47 to Prairieville and a second section from SH 274 west 3.3 miles (5.3 km) to west of Aley were added. On November 20, 1951, the road was extended westward and northward to the Kaufman–Henderson county line. On October 31, 1957, the road was extended northward to FM 988 at Lively. On October 30, 1961, the road was rerouted to run from US 75 (now I-45) to US 175: the section of FM 85 from FM 47 south to SH 198 was transferred to FM 90, the section of FM 85 from US 175 at Mabank south to then-FM 1250 was also transferred to FM 90, the section from then-FM 1129 north to then-FM 988 (which became part of FM 148 that day) was transferred to FM 2613, the section of FM 1129 from then-FM 662 to then-FM 85 was transferred to FM 85, FM 662 was combined, and FM 1250 was combined. On January 1, 1978, the section from I-45 south of Ennis northeast 0.3 miles (0.48 km) was redesignated FM 3413, while FM 85 was rerouted over the old route of FM 3413. On December 14, 1989, the section from SH 274 to US 175 was transferred to SH 334.

== FM 86 ==
Farm to Market Road 86
- Location: Caldwell and Bastrop counties
- Length: 20.702 mi (33.317 km)
- Existed: August 24, 1943–present

Farm to Market Road 86 (FM 86) is located in Caldwell and Bastrop counties.

FM 86 begins at the intersection of US 183 and FM 2984 in northern Luling. The route travels primarily to the northeast through unincorporated Caldwell County. It ends just north of the Bastrop County line, at an intersection with FM 20 near Red Rock, in the community of Bateman.

FM 86 was designated on August 24, 1943, replacing the entirety of SH 311. At the time SH 311 was designated, the section of FM 20 north of Lockhart was part of SH 21.

== FM 87 ==
Farm to Market Road 87
- Location: Fannin County
- Length: 2.375 mi (3.822 km)
- Existed: March 24, 1993–present

Farm to Market Road 87 (FM 87) is located in Fannin County. It runs from US 82 near Bonham to SH 56.

FM 87 was designated on March 24, 1993, from US 82 west of Bonham north 1.2 miles (1.9 km) to a county road intersection. On August 25, 1994, the road was extended north 0.3 miles (0.48 km) to a prison facility and a second proposed prison facility (the TDC Choice Moore Unit and Buster Cole State Jail). On June 26, 2008, the road was extended north to US 82.

=== FM 87 (1943) ===
Farm to Market Road 87
- Location: Andrews, Martin, and Howard counties
- Existed: October 6, 1943–August 29, 1990

Ranch to Market Road 87 (RM 87) was designated on October 6, 1943, from Andrews west 16.0 miles (25.7 km). On July 16, 1945, the road was extended east from Andrews to the Martin County line. The same day the road was extended east to SH 137 near Lenorah, and also on the same day the road was extended east to the Howard County line. On August 22, 1945, the road was extended west to the Texas/New Mexico state line. On May 25, 1946, the designation was changed to FM 87. On January 22, 1947, the road was extended east to Big Spring. Parts were SH 262 before 1939. On September 23, 1953, FM 87 was signed (but not designated) as SH 176. FM 87 was cancelled on August 29, 1990, as the SH 176 designation became official.

== FM 88 ==
Farm to Market Road 88
- Location: Willacy and Hidalgo counties
- Length: 28.256 mi (45.474 km)
- Existed: November 15, 1943–present

Farm to Market Road 88 (FM 88) is located in Willacy and Hidalgo counties. It runs from SH 186 south to US 281 west of Progresso.

FM 88 was designated on November 15, 1943, from SH 186 south to SH 107 in Elsa. FM 88 was the first farm-to-market route designated in Hidalgo County. On May 18, 1944, FM 88 was extended south via Weslaco (where it intersects US 83) to US 281 in Progresso. On September 22, 1953, FM 88 was extended south to the Rio Grande, replacing FM 2067. On October 24, 1963, the section of FM 88 south of US 281 was transferred to FM 1015. On June 27, 1995, the section from US 83 to US 281 was redesignated Urban Road 88 (UR 88). The designation of this section reverted to FM 88 with the elimination of the Urban Road system on November 15, 2018.

=== FM 88 (1943) ===
Farm to Market Road 88
- Location: Hidalgo County
- Length: 5.3 mi (8.5 km)
- Existed: November 15, 1943–October 24, 1963

FM 88 was designated on November 15, 1943, from US 83 to US 281 in Progresso. On September 22, 1953, FM 88 was extended south to the Rio Grande, replacing FM 2067. On October 24, 1963, the section of FM 88 south of US 281 was transferred to FM 1015.

== FM 89 ==
Farm to Market Road 89
- Location: Taylor County
- Length: 32.198 mi (51.818 km)
- Existed: December 16, 1943–present

Farm to Market Road 89 (FM 89) is located in Taylor County. It runs from FM 126 near Nolan to US 83/US 84 in Abilene.

FM 89 starts just east of the Nolan–Taylor county line. The highway straddles the Callahan Divide, surrounded by wind turbines. At Abilene State Park, the terrain becomes flatter, as the road comes into Buffalo Gap. When coming into Buffalo Gap, FM 89 winds through town then continues northward toward Abilene. Upon entering the Wylie portion of Abilene, FM 89 becomes locally known as Buffalo Gap Road, and continues with this designation past the Mall of Abilene to the Winters Freeway, where FM 89 ends. Buffalo Gap Road continues northward.

FM 89 was designated on December 16, 1943, from US 83/84 to Lake Abilene State Park. On November 10, 1947, the section from Abilene to Buffalo Gap was transferred to FM 613. On June 17, 1965, FM 89 regained its lost section, replacing a section of FM 613, but signage was not changed until January 1, 1966. On May 5, 1966, FM 89 was extended west 3.3 miles (5.3 km). On June 2, 1967, it was extended northwestward 2.0 miles (3.2 km). On August 2, 1968, it was extended west to FM 126, replacing FM 2928 (connecting section designated July 11). On June 27, 1995, the section from FM 707 to US 83/US 84 was redesignated Urban Road 89 (UR 89). The designation of this section reverted to FM 89 with the elimination of the Urban Road system on November 15, 2018.

In January 2022, construction began to upgrade a 2.3-mile (3.7 km) section of FM 89 in Abilene. Plans to improve the roadway had been included as part of the city's transportation plan as early as 1995 and were necessitated by increased development in the southern part of the city. The project is scheduled to be completed in March 2024.

== FM 90 ==
Farm to Market Road 90
- Location: Kaufman and Van Zandt counties
- Length: 13.209 mi (21.258 km)
- Existed: March 30, 1944–present

Farm to Market Road 90 (FM 90) is a 13.2-mile-long (21.2 km) route located in Kaufman and Van Zandt counties.

The road begins at an intersection with SH 198 in Mabank, and heads north towards Prairieville. North of there, the road turns northeast to its northern terminus, an intersection with FM 47/FM 3227 near Whitton.

FM 90 was formed on March 30, 1944, from SH 31 in Malakoff to Cross Roads. It was routed over Spur 63 on August 1, 1944, replacing it. On October 30, 1961, FM 90 replaced a section of FM 316 from SH 31 to its current southern terminus. FM 90 also replaced FM 1617 from FM 316 to FM 85 (now SH 334). It also replaced a section of FM 85 from FM 47 to what was then FM 1617. On May 19, 1983, the section from Mabank to Malakoff was transferred to SH 198 and the section from Malakoff to Cross Roads was renumbered as FM 3441.

== FM 91 ==
Farm to Market Road 91
- Location: Hardeman and Wilbarger counties
- Length: 26.131 mi (42.054 km)
- Existed: February 11, 1944–present

Farm to Market Road 91 (FM 91) is located in Hardeman and Wilbarger counties. It runs from FM 1167 near Medicine Mound to US 283.

FM 91 was designated on February 11, 1944, from US 287 in Chillicothe via Odell to US 283. On July 15, 1949, the highway was extended south 6.0 miles (9.7 km) with a spur connection west 1.0 mile (1.6 km) added. On October 26, 1954, FM 91 was rerouted over the spur connection and was extended to FM 1167 at Medicine Mound, while the old route south was renumbered FM 392. On April 29, 1959, a spur connection in Medicine Mound, designated FM Spur 91, was added.

== FM 92 ==
Farm to Market Road 92
- Location: Tyler and Hardin counties
- Length: 38.946 mi (62.678 km)
- Existed: February 11, 1944–present

Farm to Market Road 92 (FM 92) is located in Tyler and Hardin counties. It runs from US 96 at Silsbee to 2.2 miles (3.5 km) north of US 190.

FM 92 was designated on February 11, 1944, from US 96 (this section became Loop 498 on November 30, 1978, and it is now Bus. US 96) in Silsbee northward to US 190. On May 7, 1970, FM 92 was extended north 2.2 miles (3.5 km) from US 190. On August 28, 1991, the FM 92 designation was extended north to RE 255; however, this extension is not yet constructed.

Town Bluff, one of the earliest settlements in Tyler County, is located along FM 92.

The road is mentioned in the ZZ Top song "Avalon Hideaway" on the 1976 album Tejas.

== FM 93 ==
Farm to Market Road 93
- Location: Bell County
- Length: 15.921 mi (Note: The certified length given is shorter than the actual mileage, as the Texas Department of Transportation description of FM 93 considers it to be discontinuous at rather than concurrent with SH 317.) (25.622 km)
- Existed: June 2, 1967–present

Farm to Market Road 93 (FM 93) is located in Bell County. It runs from FM 439 to US 190 at Heidenheimer.

FM 93 was designated on June 2, 1967, from FM 817 east to I-35. On January 31, 1974, the road was extended east to US 190 at Heidenheimer and west to FM 439, replacing all of FM 2748 west of SH 317, a section of FM 817, a section of FM 1741 (new road built; old road is now Taylors Valley Road), and all of FM 2618, but signing of FM 2618 as FM 93 did not start until the construction of FM 2618 was completed. On June 27, 1995, the section between FM 439 and FM 1741 was redesignated Urban Road 93 (UR 93). The designation of this section reverted to FM 93 with the elimination of the Urban Road system on November 15, 2018.

Junction list

The entire route is in Bell County.

Location	mi	km	Destinations	Notes
	0.0	0.0	FM 439 – Killeen	
Belton	5.0	8.0	Loop 121	
Belton	6.0	9.7	SH 317 south (Main Street)	South end of SH 317 overlap
Belton	6.3	10.1	SH 317 north (North Main Street) – UMHB	North end of SH 317 overlap
Belton	7.3	11.7	I-35 / US 190 (Future I-14) – Waco, Austin	I-35 exit 294B
Temple	10.9	17.5	FM 1741 north (31st Street)	
	14.5	23.3	SH 95 – Temple, Holland	Interchange
	15.7	25.3	US 190 (Future I-14) / SH 36 – Temple, Cameron	Interchange
	16.2	26.1	Bus. US 190	
1.000 mi = 1.609 km; 1.000 km = 0.621 mi: Concurrency terminus

=== RM 93 (1944) ===
Ranch to Market Road 93
- Location: Travis, Blanco, Burnet, and Llano counties
- Existed: February 11, 1944–September 1, 1965

A previous route numbered Ranch to Market Road 93 (RM 93) was designated on February 11, 1944, from US 290 at or near Austin to US 281 south of Marble Falls. On September 28, 1949, RM 93 was extended northwest to SH 16 at Llano. On October 24, 1955, RM 93 was signed, but not designated, as an extension of SH 71. RM 93 was cancelled on September 1, 1965, and officially transferred to SH 71, as that route was extended further west to Brady.

== FM 94 ==
Farm to Market Road 94
- Location: Childress, Hall, Cottle, and Motley counties
- Length: 50.849 mi (81.834 km)
- Existed: February 11, 1944–present

Farm to Market Road 94 (FM 94) is located in the Texas Panhandle. It runs from US 62/US 83 south of Childress to SH 70 in Matador. A spur connection, FM Spur 94, connects to US 62/US 70 in Matador.

FM 94 was designated on February 11, 1944, from Childress west to Tell. On March 18, 1947, a section of War Highway 16 (which was already part of FM 94) from US 83 west 1.75 miles (2.82 km) was added to FM 94, and FM 94 was extended to US 287 in Childress, replacing Loop 146. On November 20, 1951, the road was extended 17.8 miles (28.6 km) south to Northfield. On October 28, 1953, the road was extended southwest 6.5 miles (10.5 km), and another 9.5 miles (15.3 km) southwest on October 26, 1954. On November 21, 1956, the road was extended southwest 11.5 miles (18.5 km) to US 70 in Matador. On December 14, 1959, the section of FM 94 north of FM 2042 was transferred to FM 2042, and FM 94 was rerouted over the old route of FM 2042. One section of FM 2042 was transferred to FM 164 on September 5, 1973, and another section north to FM 164 was transferred to FM 3468 on August 4, 1988. On January 2, 1962, FM Spur 94, connecting to SH 70 in Matador, was added. On September 24, 2007, by district request, FM 94 was routed over FM Spur 94 to SH 70 while FM Spur 94 was rerouted over the former route of FM 94 to US 62/US 70. On October 25, 2012, the road was realigned on a new route west of FM 2042; the former route was turned over to Childress County.

== FM 95 ==
Farm to Market Road 95
- Location: Rusk and Nacogdoches counties
- Length: 52.562 mi (84.590 km)
- Existed: May 18, 1944–present

Farm to Market Road 95 (FM 95) is located in Rusk and Nacogdoches counties. It runs from FM 1798 in Minden south to SH 103.

FM 95 was designated on May 18, 1944, from US 59 in Garrison to the Nacogdoches–Rusk county line. On May 7, 1948, FM 95 was extended northwest to SH 26 (now US 259) west of Minden. On December 10, 1951, FM 95 was extended northwest to FM 839, replacing FM 1716 (the connecting section was designated on November 20). On January 27, 1953, the section west of FM 1798 was transferred to FM 1798. On June 18, 1964, FM 95 was extended south to SH 103, replacing FM 1274. Part of what was FM 1274 was originally numbered FM 1863.

== FM 96 ==
Farm to Market Road 96
- Location: Cass County
- Length: 11.834 mi (19.045 km)
- Existed: May 23, 1951–present

Farm to Market Road 96 (FM 96) is located in Cass County. It runs from SH 77 north and southeast to US 59.

FM 96 was designated on May 23, 1951, from SH 77 northward 3.3 miles (5.3 km) to Antioch. On January 23, 1953, FM 96 was extended north and southeast to US 59.

=== FM 96 (1944) ===
Farm to Market Road 96
- Location: Eastland County
- Existed: April 19, 1944–May 17, 1948

A previous route numbered FM 96 was designated on April 19, 1944, from Gorman to Desdemona in Eastland County. FM 96 was cancelled on May 17, 1948, and became a portion of FM 8.

== FM 97 ==
Farm to Market Road 97
- Location: Floyd and Motley counties
- Length: 35.623 mi (57.330 km)
- Existed: May 18, 1944–present

Farm to Market Road 97 (FM 97) is located in Floyd and Motley counties. It runs from SH 70 west to US 70 in Lockney.

FM 97 was designated on May 18, 1944, from SH 18 (now SH 70) westward to Flomot. On June 11, 1945, FM 97 was extended west to the Motley–Floyd county line. On December 2, 1953, FM 97 was extended west to SH 207, replacing FM 785. On March 24, 1958, FM 97 was extended west and south to Loop 75 in Lockney, replacing FM 135 (although it remained signed as FM 135 until the 1959 travel map was released). Later, FM 97 was rerouted west to US 70, with the old route to Loop 75 being redesignated as a spur connection. On January 20, 1964, the spur connection to Lockney was cancelled because it was already part of FM 378 (which had extended north from what is now FM 37 on December 21, 1959).

== FM 98 ==
Farm to Market Road 98
- Location: Foard and Wilbarger counties
- Length: 20.374 mi (32.789 km)
- Existed: May 18, 1944–present

Farm to Market Road 98 (FM 98) is located in Foard and Wilbarger counties. It runs from SH 6 near Crowell northeast to US 70

FM 98 was designated on May 18, 1944, from US 70 in Crowell northeast to Margaret. On October 28, 1953, FM 98 was extended east 4.0 miles (6.4 km) from Margaret. On November 1, 1955, FM 98 was extended east to US 70, replacing FM 2183 (connecting section designated September 21, 1955). On September 29, 1977, FM 98 was extended south and west to SH 6.

== FM 99 ==
Farm to Market Road 99
- Location: Karnes, Atascosa, Live Oak, and McMullen counties
- Length: 53.902 mi (86.747 km)
- Existed: April 19, 1944–present

Farm to Market Road 99 (FM 99) is located in Karnes, Atascosa, Live Oak, and McMullen counties. It runs from FM 1144 in Karnes City to a road intersection 4 miles (6.4 km) south of SH 72.

FM 99 was designated on April 19, 1944, from Karnes City to the Karnes–Atascosa county line. On May 15, 1946, FM 99 was extended west to Fashing. On October 23, 1948, another section from US 281 (now Bus. US 281) at Whitsett north to the Live Oak–Atascosa county line was added, creating a gap. On September 19, 1951, the sections were connected, closing the gap. On October 28, 1953, FM 99 was extended southwest to the Live Oak–McMullen county line. On October 27, 1954, FM 99 was extended south to FM 63 (which became part of SH 72 on December 15, 1960) in Calliham, replacing FM 2153. On March 27, 1981, a section of FM 99 was closed as it would be inundated by Choke Canyon Reservoir, so FM 99 was rerouted on a new alignment west and extended south to a road intersection 4.0 miles (6.4 km) miles south of SH 72, replacing FM 1106. SH 72 was also rerouted around the reservoir.
