= Brazos Point, Texas =

- Ghost town
- Location within Texas Location within the United States
- Coordinates: 32°11′14″N 97°37′09″W
- Country: United States
- State: Texas
- County: Bosque
- Elevation: 630 ft (190 m)
- Time zone: UTC-6 (Central (CST))
  - Summer (DST): UTC-5 (CDT)
- Area code: 254
- GNIS feature ID: 1331214

Brazos Point is a ghost town in Bosque County, in the U.S. state of Texas.

== Geography ==
Brazos Point was located off Farm to Market Road 56, 11 mi (18 km) northeast of Walnut Springs and 50 mi (80 km) northwest of Waco in northeastern Bosque County.

== Education ==
Brazos Point had its own school in 1860. Today, Brazos Point is located within the Kopperl Independent School District.
