= Mall of Abilene =

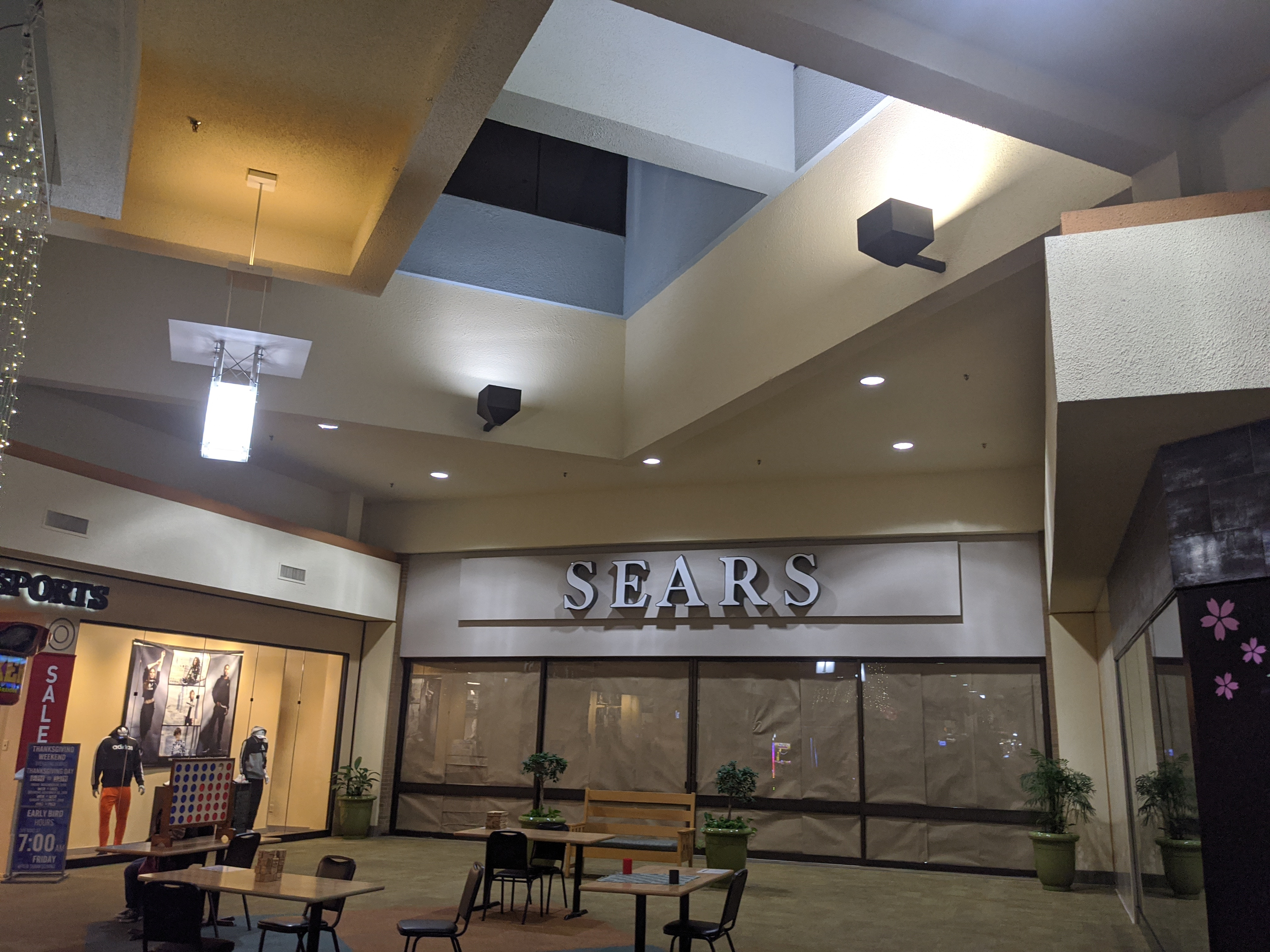
- Sears (now closed) with circa 1963 logo
- Location: Abilene, Texas, United States
- Coordinates: 32.4004°N 99.7621°W
- Address: 4310 Buffalo Gap Road
- Opened: March 14, 1979
- Developer: Paul Broadhead
- Manager: Jones Lang LaSalle
- Owner: Jones Lang LaSalle
- Num. of stores: 80
- Num. of anchor tenants: 6 (5 open, 1 vacant)
- Floor area: 680,457 sq ft (63,216.5 m^{2})
- Floors: 1 (2 in former Sears)
- Parking: 3689 spaces
- Website: www.mallofabilene.com

Mall of Abilene is an enclosed shopping mall in Abilene, Texas. It is located in the south side of the city, at the southwest corner of Buffalo Gap Road and US 83/84 (Winters Freeway). Occupying a 61-acre plot of land, It serves a 22-county trade area. Five stores anchor the mall JCPenney, Dillard's, Best Buy, Ulta, and Books-A-Million with one vacant anchor last occupied by Sears. The mall also houses the 15,000 sq ft (1,400 m^{2}) Premiere Cinema 10 in a converted UA Theaters 6. The mall's gross leasable area of nearly 1,000,000 sq ft (93,000 m^{2}) consists of a total of 80 stores, excluding the theater, 7 of which have a leasable area of at least 56,000 sq ft (5,200 m^{2}). As of 2005, the mall generates 8.7 million visitors per year.

== History ==
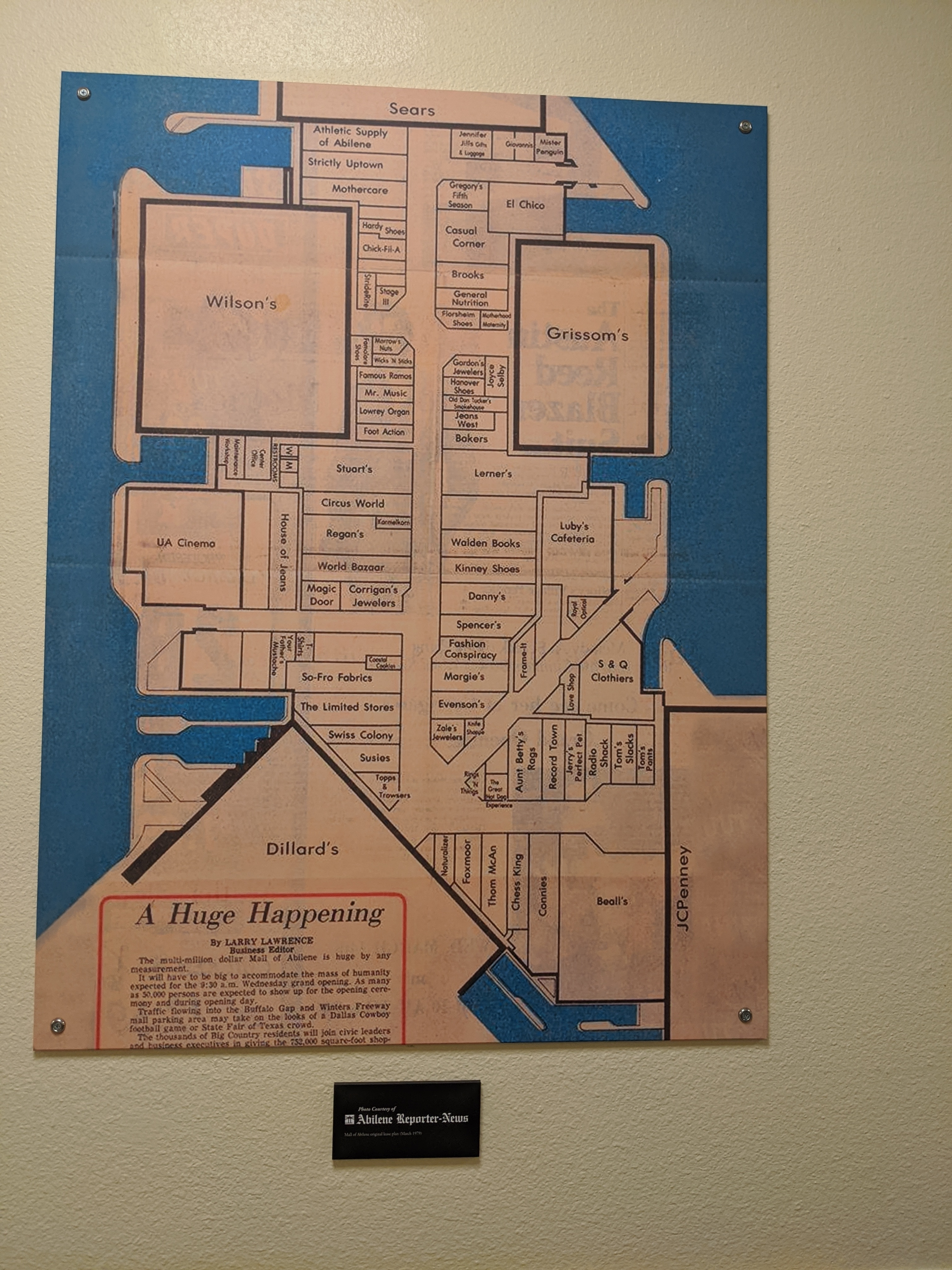
Print Of Reporter News Clipping Depicting The Mall's Corridor Configuration

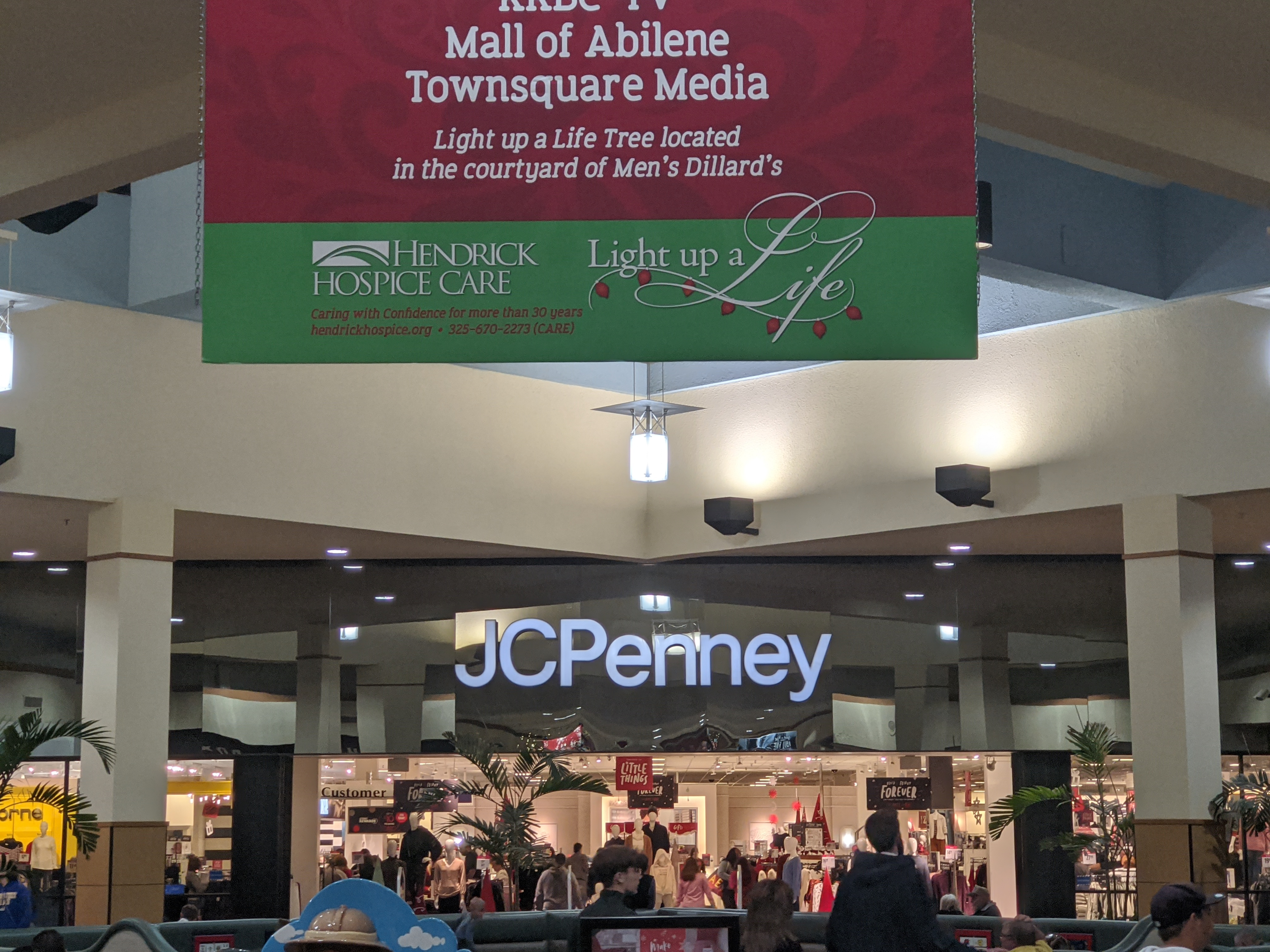
JCPenney with circa 1971 logo

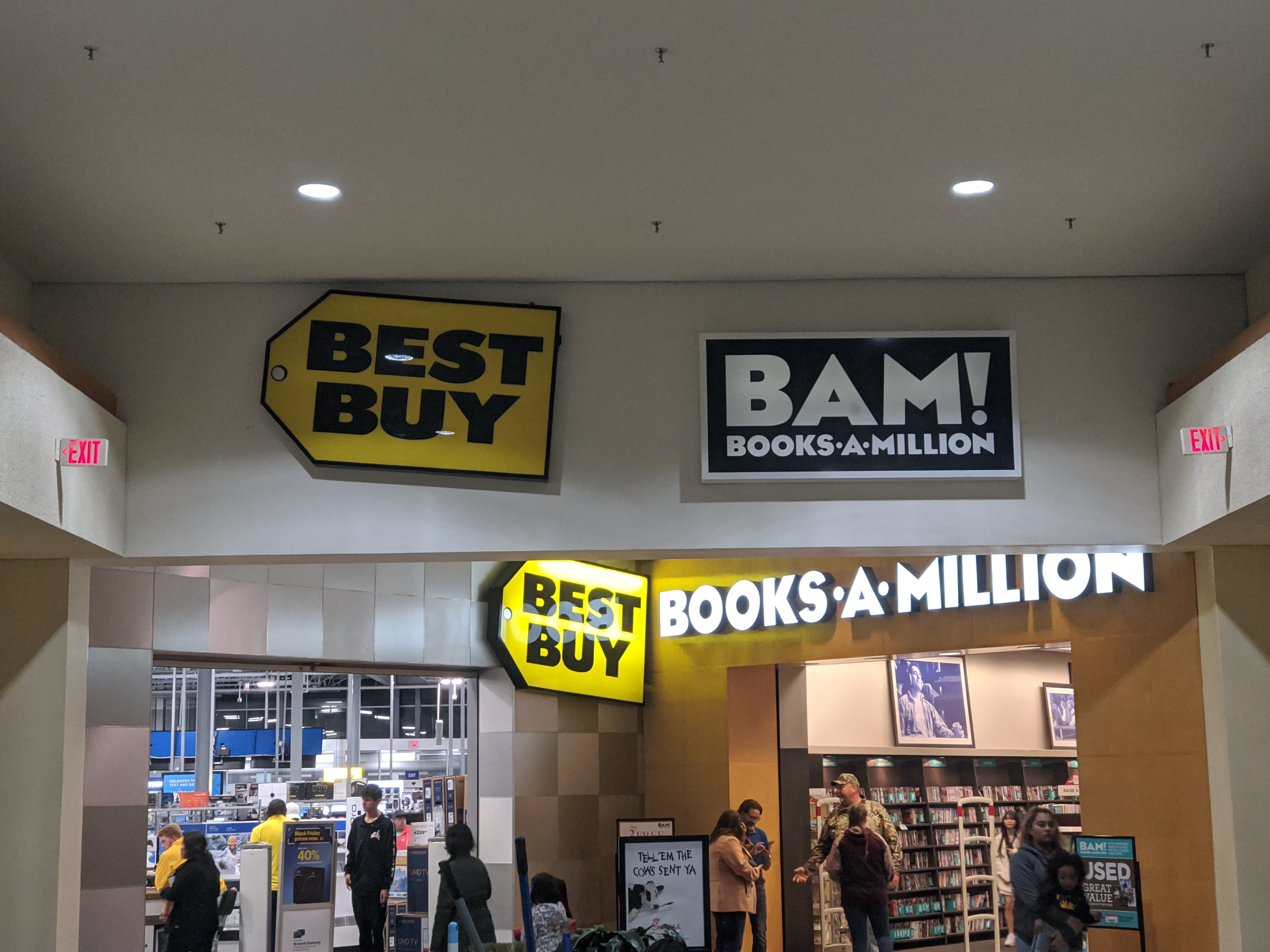
Best Buy and Books-A-Million

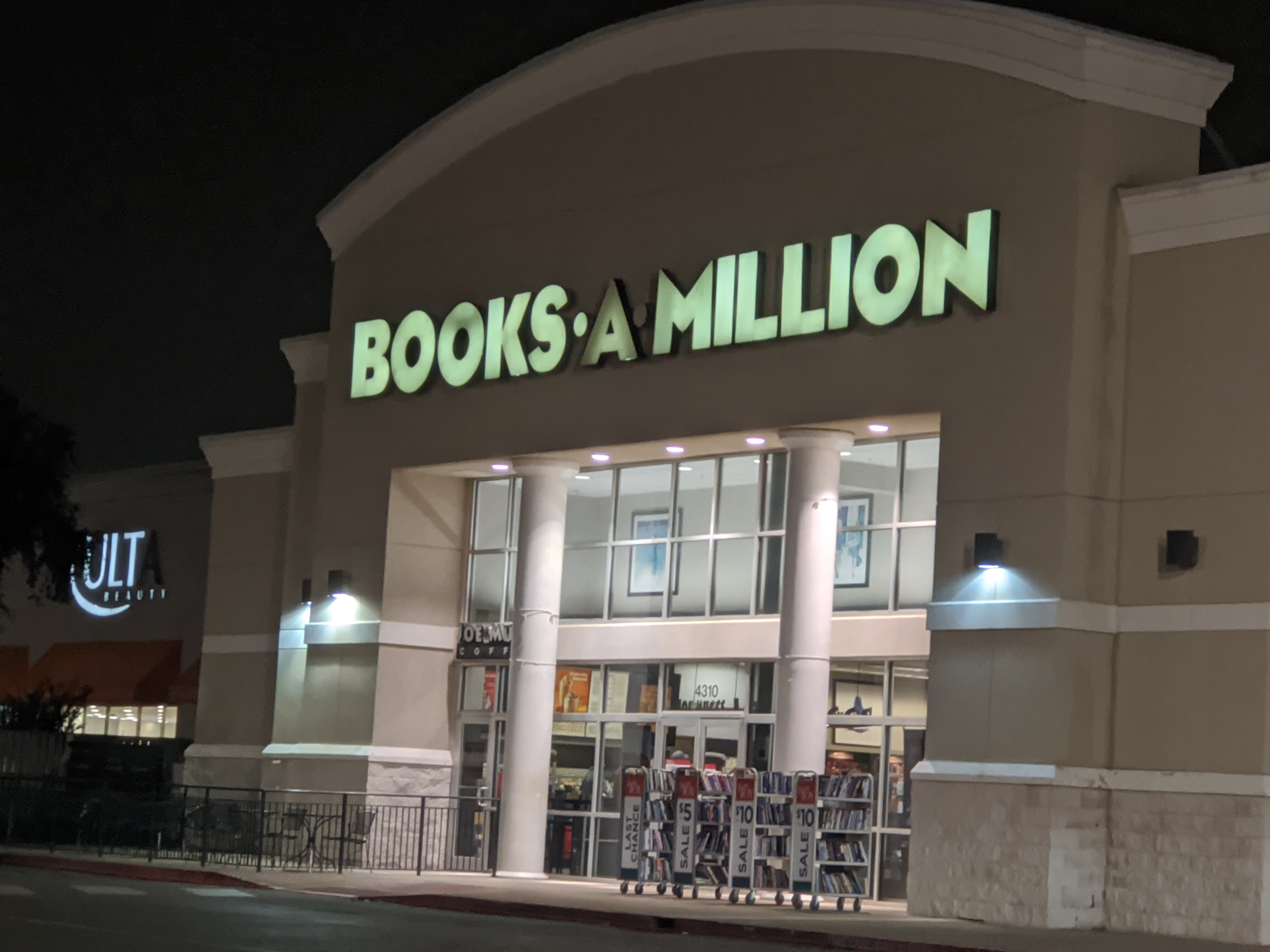
Exterior Entrances To Books-A-Million and Ulta Beauty

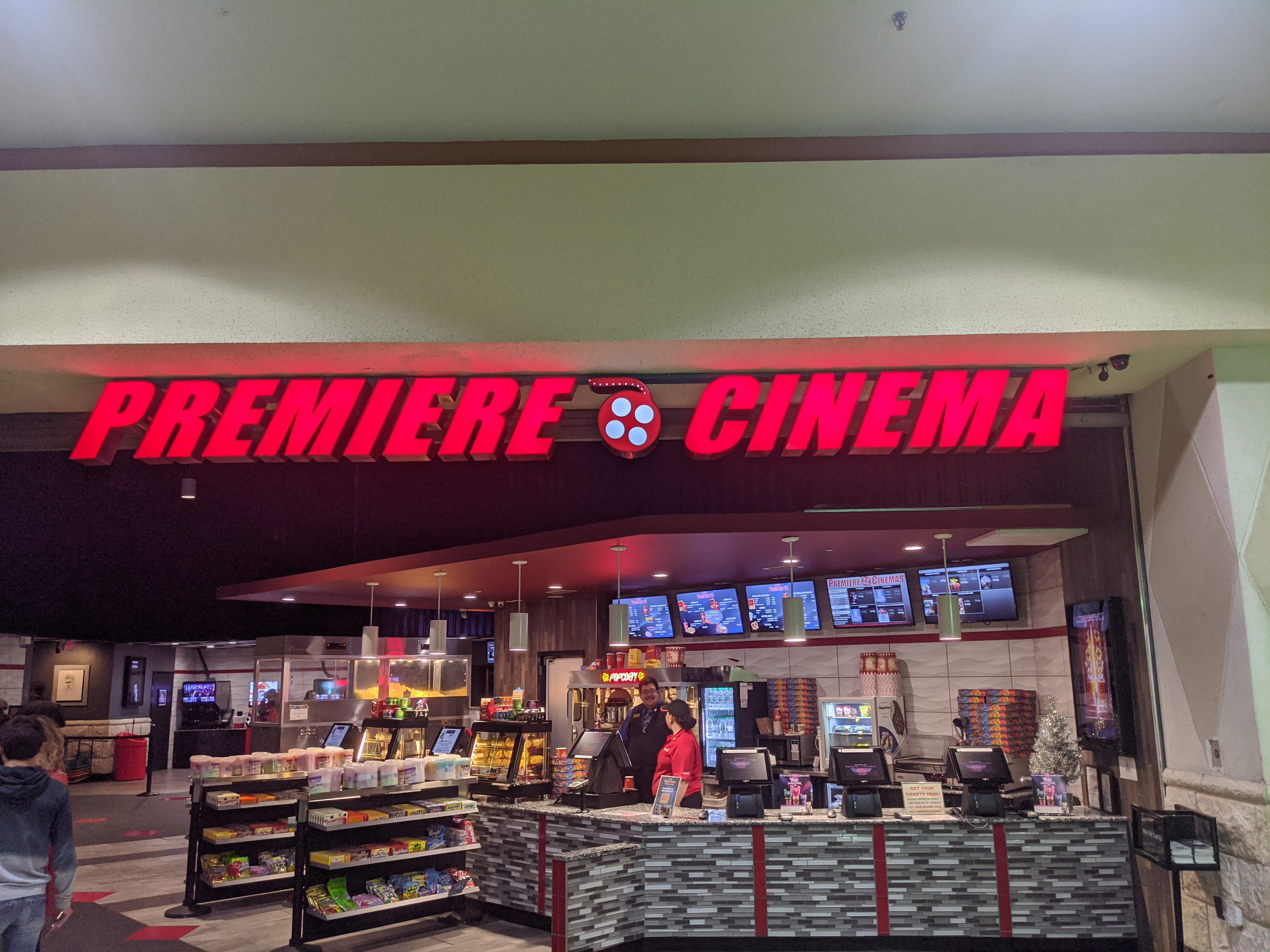
Premiere Cinema 10, in the former UA Theaters 6

The Mall of Abilene began its development in 1977, when ground was broken for a new shopping complex in the growing southern reaches of Abilene. Developed by Paul Broadhead & Associates, the complex would initially cost $28 million to develop, with the mall opening to shoppers in March 1979.

The mall would open with Dillard's, JCPenney, Sears, H. J. Wilson Co. (later Service Merchandise, now the second Dillard's store) and Grissom's (later Dunlap's, now Best Buy, Books-a-Million, and Ulta) as its anchor stores.

The mall's initial junior anchors would be Beall's, UA Theaters 6, Lerner's and Luby's Cafeteria.

Some original inline tenants would include; Chick-fil-A (now closed), Express (now closed), GNC, El Chico (now closed), Footaction, Motherhood Maternity (now closed), Spencer's and Zales; all of which have been at the mall for the last 40 years.

As the years progressed the makeup of these tenants had partially changed, at one point Grissom's was replaced by Dunlaps. Wilson's would re-open as Service Merchandise in 1985.

Later on, tenants like Ulta Beauty and Chuck-E-Cheese (now Spirit Halloween) would occupy the two spaces next to the main entrance, with the vacant Luby's becoming Ulta Beauty.

On December 28, 2018, it was announced that Sears would be closing as part of a plan to close 80 stores nationwide. The store closed in March 2019. The space was later occupied by Hendrick Service Center in 2023.
