= 1896 Sherman tornado =

1896 United States tornado

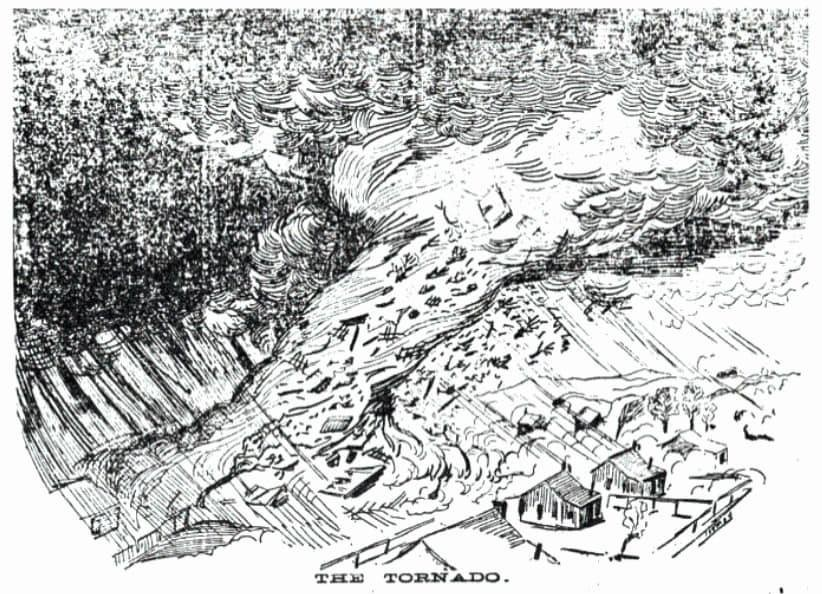
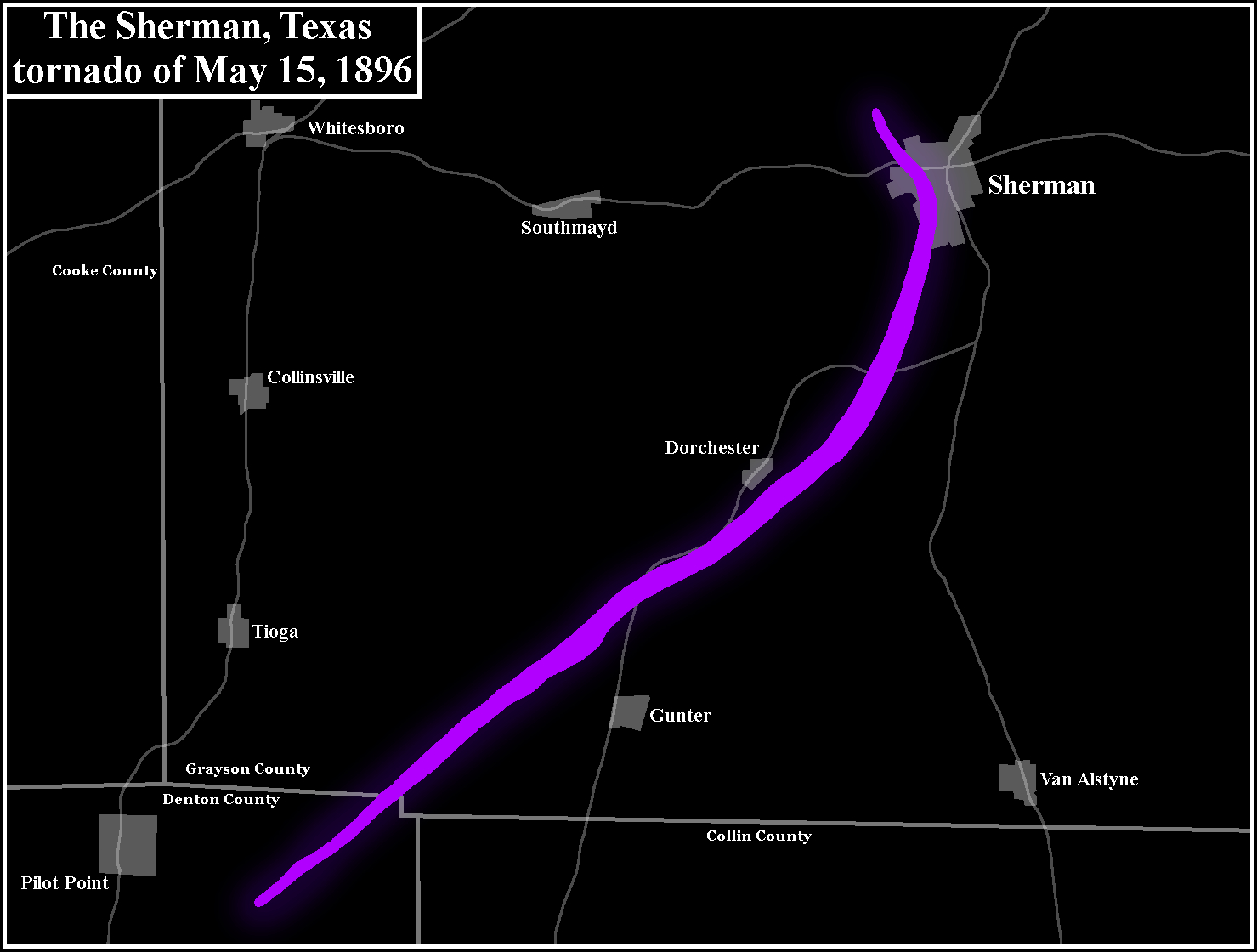
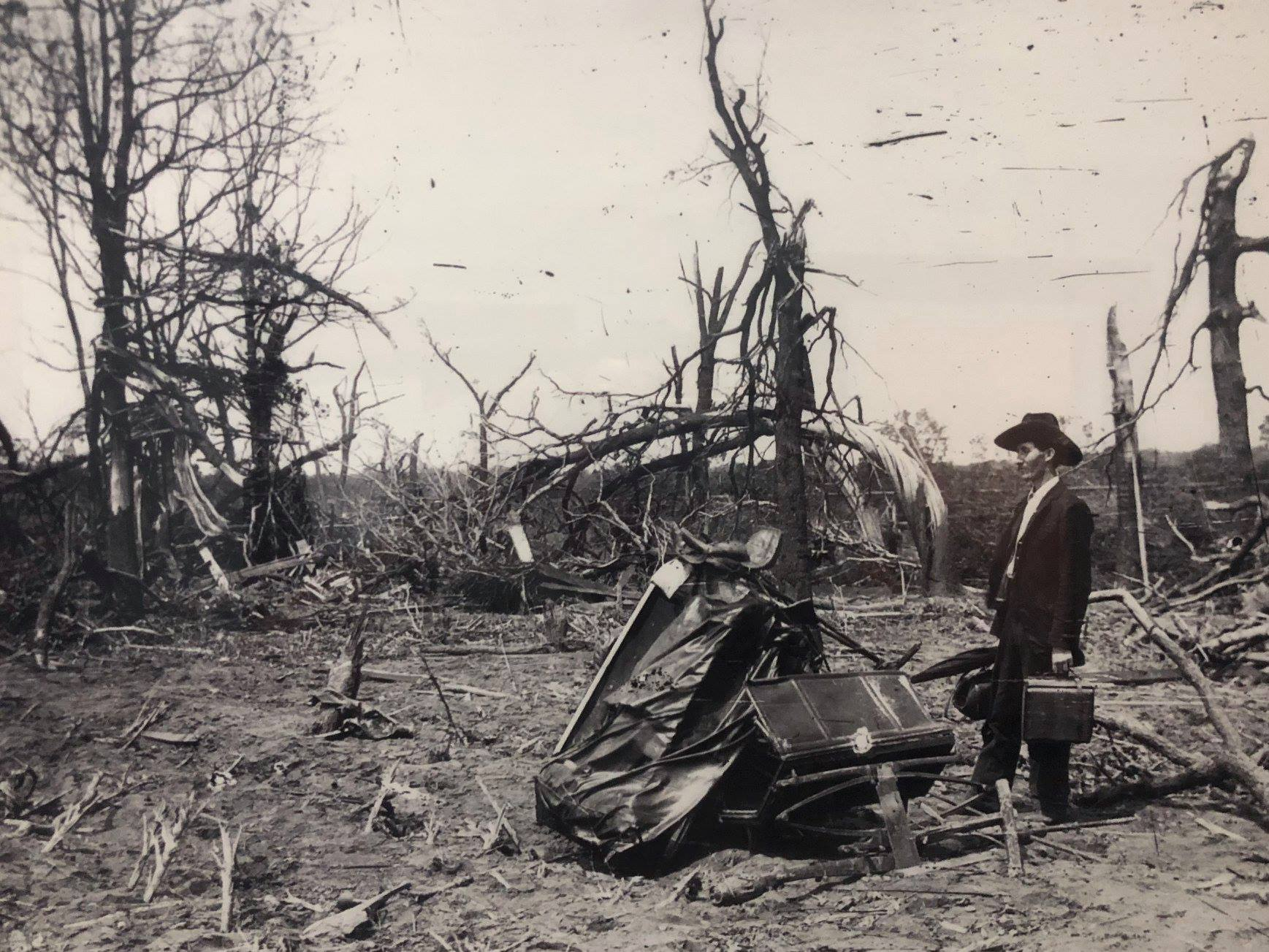
- Counterclockwise from top An artist's rendition of the Sherman tornado after eye-witnessing the event The track of the Sherman tornado Violent tornado damage to a vehicle near Sherman

Meteorological history
- Formed: May 15, 1896, 3:55 p.m. CST (UTC−05:00)
- Dissipated: May 15, 1896, 4:35 p.m. CST (UTC−05:00)
- Duration: ~40 minutes

F5 equiv. tornado
- Highest winds: >260 mph (418 km/h)

Overall effects
- Fatalities: 73+
- Injuries: >200
- Economic losses: >$500,000 (1896 USD)
- Areas affected: Denton and Grayson Counties, Texas, United States; primarily the city of Sherman
- Part of the Tornado outbreaks of mid-to-late May, 1896

During the afternoon hours of May 15, 1896, an extremely violent and deadly tornado tracked 28 miles (45 km) through the northeastern portions of the U.S. state of Texas, damaging or destroying many farms and rural homes in Denton and Grayson Counties before devastating the city of Sherman. The tornado was part of a larger tornado outbreak sequence that lasted from May 15–20, 1896, which primarily affected Texas and Kansas. The tornado caused more than $500,000 (1896 USD) in damages, injured more than 200 people, and claimed the lives of at least 73 people, with 62 of them from Sherman alone. As of 2025, the tornado remains the fourth deadliest tornado in Texas state history. Due to the tornado occurring prior to 1950, the tornado does not have an official rating, however this tornado is widely accepted to have been equivalent to an F5 on the Fujita Scale. This event is often referred to as Sherman's Black Friday.

The tornado touched down approximately 3 miles (4.8 km) east-southeast of Pilot Point in extreme northeastern Denton County. Homes near the beginning of the path sustained significant damage as the tornado tracked northeast. The tornado crossed into Grayson County, leveling farm after farm to the west of Gunter, and Farmington, and obliterated farms between Dorchester and Howe. The tornado narrowed in size and began to occlude as the tornado slowly turned more northerly. Despite the occlusion and shrinking size, the tornado intensified as it swept multiple farms away south of Sherman. The tornado then tore a narrow path through the western sides of the city at around 4:55 PM CST, leaving no structure in its path untouched. The tornado mangled the Houston Street bridge into "useless scrap". The tornado exited Sherman to the northwest, rapidly dissipating shortly after. At least 73 people were killed throughout the tornado's 28 miles (45 km) long track; six between Gunter and Dorchester, five just outside of Sherman, and the rest perished within the city.

== Meteorological synopsis ==
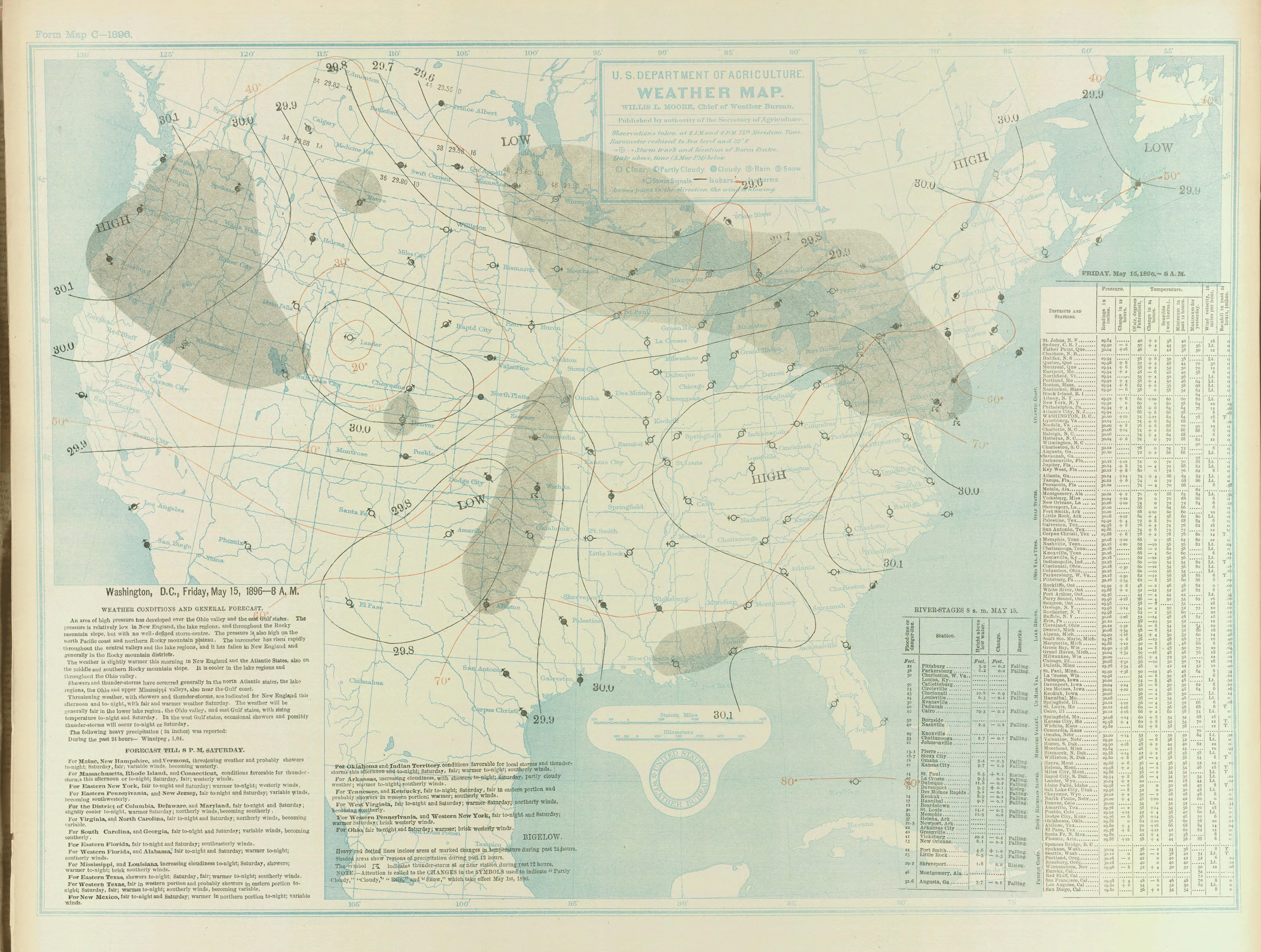
The Daily Weather Map for May 15, 1896

=== Weather conditions prior ===
For 10 days leading up to May 15 in northeastern Texas was described as having, "Unusual humidity, variable winds of freaky fickleness and force, very high daily temperature, remarkably cool nights and a persistently low barometer". This was despite the lack of rainfall in the region surrounding Sherman, with the heat during the day being "almost unbearable for human life."

During the morning hours of May 15, a deep low pressure system was observed over the Texas and Oklahoma Panhandles. A strong ridge of high pressure was also observed over the eastern US. 1000 MB (Near surface) humidity values were high as a moist and warm air mass moved throughout the Red River Valley. Creating an environment with strong temperature and pressure differences. With the addition of strong wind sheer over the valley, the environment was highly favorable for strong tornadoes.

At 8 AM EST, the U.S. Weather Bureau released the daily weather map forecast for May 15, 1896. In the forecast, it was noted for Oklahoma and the Indian Territory, that conditions were favorable for localized storms in the afternoon and evening hours. Temperatures were recorded at 72 degrees Fahrenheit, and were expected to rise by up to 8 degrees throughout the afternoon and evening. Winds were recorded from the south moving northeastward at 6 mph (9.7 km/h). It was noted that prior to the storms, "There was a stifling atmospheric condition that made breathing difficult. At the signal station the barometer stood at the danger point."

=== Supercell formation and prior tornadoes ===
A discrete supercell initiated west of the Dallas–Fort Worth metroplex. The supercell tracked northeastward, and at 2:15 PM CST, produced its first tornado. The first tornado tracked for 13 miles (21 km), wiping out the town of Justin, claiming at least 2 lives. The supercell soon cycled and produce a second tornado near the city of Denton. The second tornado tracked for 17.2 miles (27.7 km) and impacted the community of Gribble Springs, claiming between 3 and 8 lives. Residents of Sherman would notice dark clouds as the supercell approached, before producing heavy downpours of rain onto the city, Around the same time, the supercell cycled once again, producing its third, and most infamous tornado.

== Tornado Summary ==
=== Northeastern Denton County ===
At around 3:55 PM CST, a funnel touched down around 3 miles (4.8 km) east-southeast of Pilot Point, eyewitnesses described the funnel as "a huge elephant's trunk in search of food, feeling its way down." Farm homes in the area were shifted off of their foundations, and outbuildings were leveled as the tornado tracked northeast. Eyewitnesses reported a second storm tracking directly northwest towards the Sherman supercell, and that between the two storms, "There was a magnificent electrical display in a greenish cloudbank along the western horizon. With spectacular vividness sheet lightning kept the heavens illuminated, during which time frequent fiery zigzag bolts of intense brightness flashed down into the earth." The tornado didn't take on the usual "wedge" shape associated with violent tornadoes, instead the tornado was described by eyewitnesses as a "perfect funnel."

=== Rural Grayson County ===
As the tornado crossed into Grayson County, the tornado intensified rapidly to F5 strength, demolishing and sweeping away several farms. The tornado widened to its maximum width of 400 yd (1,200 ft) as the tornado tracked northwest of Gunter and southeast of Dorchester. Around six people were killed in this area, including three at one farm home. A mother and their two children were visiting another families home when the tornado approached. The owners family had already fled to shelter, however the visiting family refused to go. The home owner continued to urge the visiting family to seek shelter up until the tornado struck. The owner later regained consciousness around 100 yards away from his home, waking up near the bodies of the visiting family. Horses and cattle on various farms in the same area were killed. Some eyewitness reports noted that the tornado potentially lifted, before the tornado returned to the earth just southwest of Sherman.

=== City of Sherman ===
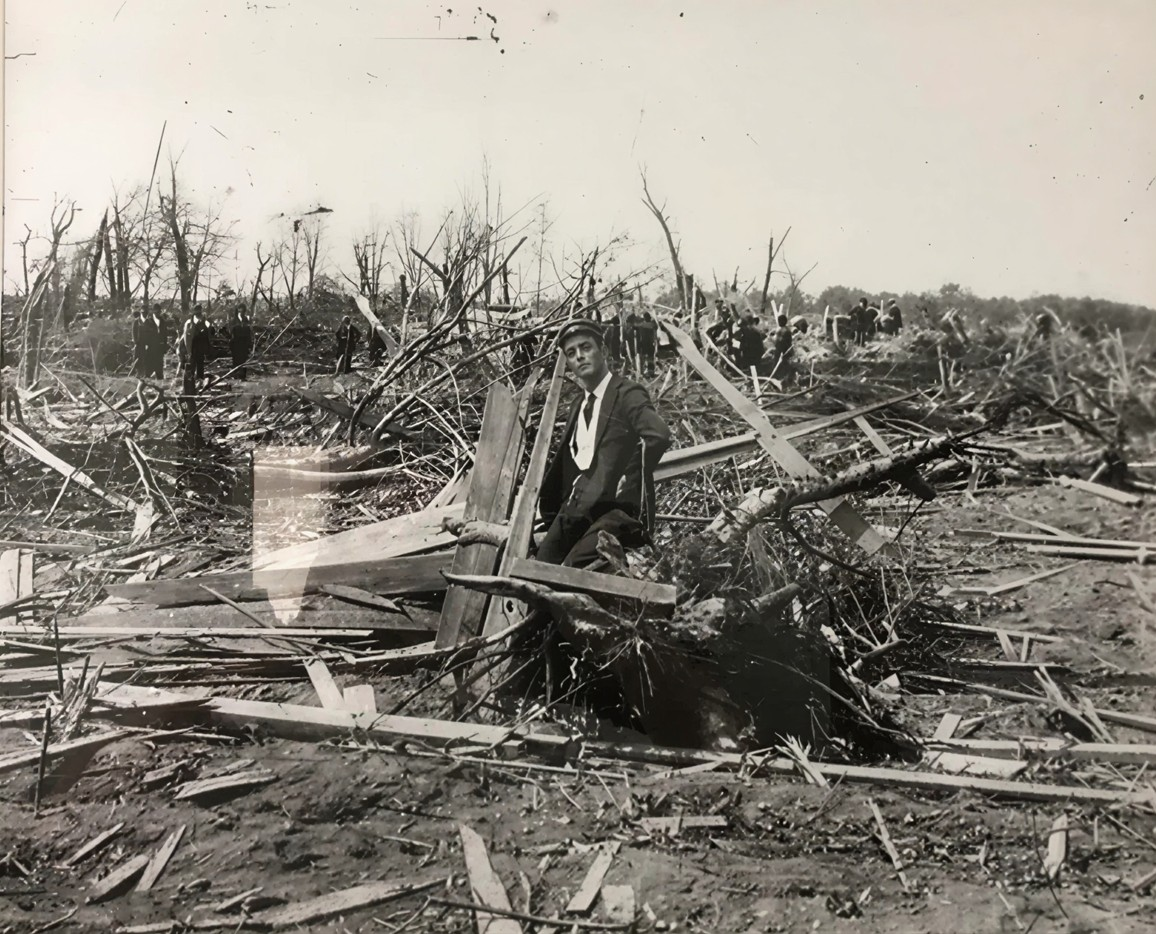
A man standing in the debris of what was once a home in Sherman.

The tornado began to occlude northwestward, putting the city of Sherman in the tornadoes direct path. Many rural homes just outside of Sherman would sustain extreme damage as the tornado rapidly intensified, claiming at least 5 additional lives before entering the city limits at around 4:25 - 4:30 pm CST. The tornadoes damage path through the city was only approximately 200 yards at its widest, with an average width of 60 yards, however every structure in the path was completely destroyed, including at least 50 large homes, with 20 being obliterated beyond recognition. Debris from homes, trees, and other structures completely encircled the tornado, and were thrown across the city.

The tornado first struck Gray's Hill, impacting sparsely settled areas along 6th street, with houses being "carried upward into the mighty whirlwind". Large brick homes were pulverized and completely destroyed. The tornado then struck the Houston street bridge, ripping the iron beam bridge from its supports, tearing the bridge to shreds, twisting the huge iron girders like straw, and leaving the bridge as "unusable scrap metal". "Elegant residences" in the same area would be obliterated by the tornado, being swept clean and debris being granulated to splinters. Debris from the homes were scattered all across the city, littering the streets. The tornado then struck neighborhoods primarily inhabited by African-Americans at peak intensity. Hundreds of cabins were "blown off the face of the earth" as the violent tornado effortlessly lifted homes off of their foundations, with fences and trees "whirling through the air like they were mere shavings". The tornado dug into the earth, covering buildings, debris, and bodies in mud. "Great oak trees" were "torn up by the roots or twisted or twisted off like reeds". Bodies were thrown hundreds to thousands of feet from their homes, with many dead being found in riverbeds and empty fields. A trunk lid was carried for 35 miles (56 km) and headstones at a cemetery were shattered, with a 500-pound stone being carried for 250 yards. Vegetation in the storm's path evinced fire effects, including tree limbs "as black as night from the last leaflet to the main body" and storm victims in Sherman showed signs of burns such as crumbly clothing, scorch marks, and "the smell of burnt human flesh". Multiple railroads in the city were damaged beyond usage.

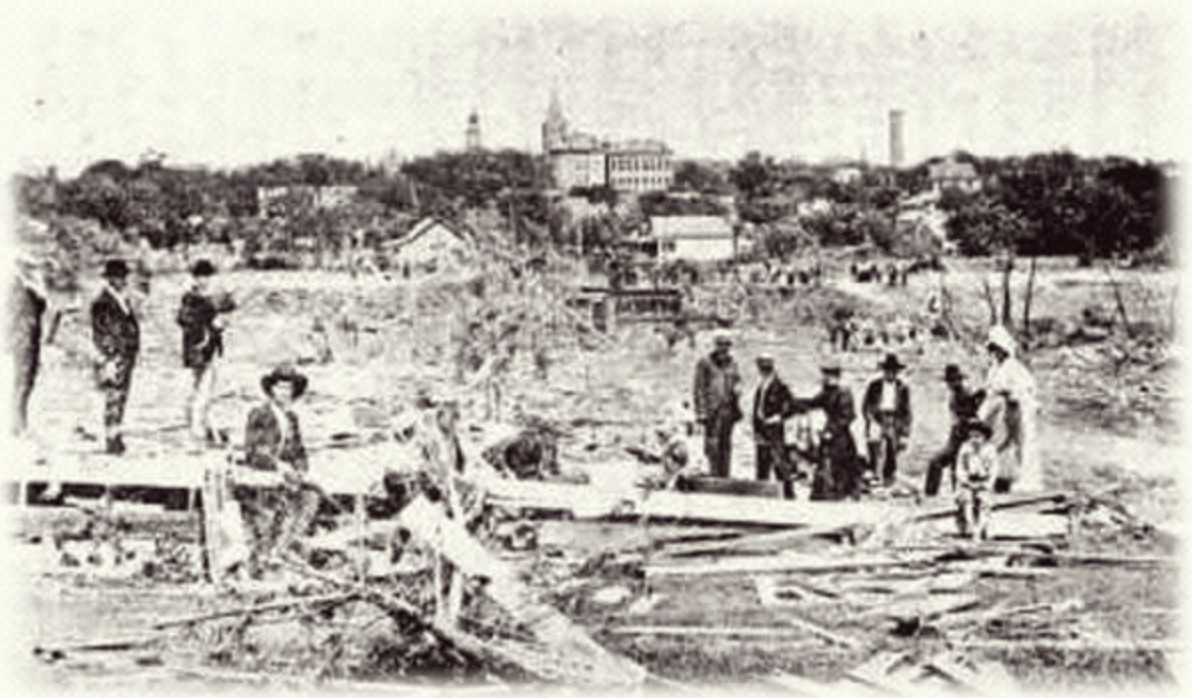
The remains of the Houston Street Bridge after the tornado.

An eyewitness in Sherman would describe the event as follows

"As the storm approached near the city the noise became greater and more unmistakable; a mighty sound, not loud and shrill, but deeper and vaster than words can paint. People became wild with alarm. Some of them left their stores and ran in all directions. Others were so overcome with terror and their own helplessness that they stood still. Many men hurried to their homes, fearing the worst. The storm passed the city in two or three minutes; the rain ceased and the skies brightened."

The tornado left Sherman, tracking for 2 more miles before lifting to the northwest.

== Aftermath ==
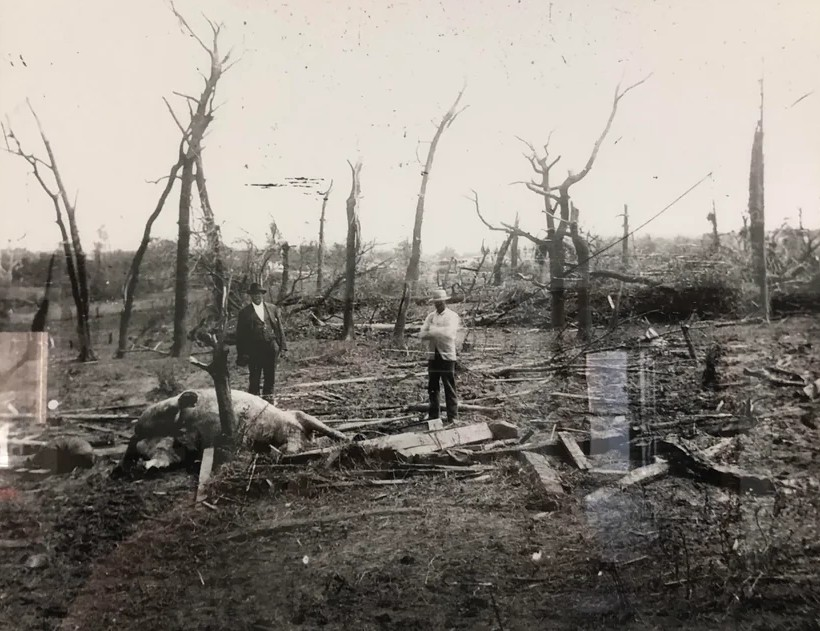
Ruins of a home in the Grays Hill area

At least 73 people were killed by the tornado, with at least 62 being in Sherman alone. However this number is disputed as sources reported at least 140 deaths across Texas on May 15 due to tornadoes.

Immediately following the tornado, every wagon in Sherman was deployed to help the victims of the tornado. Injuries among some of the dead were noted to have been often times without heads or other limbs, with some others being mangled into "every conceivable shape". Many corpses were noted to have just been shapeless masses of flesh who were likely unable to be identified before burial due to relatives also being killed. Both the wounded and the dead were covered in so much mud, it was impossible to recognize anyone until they had been washed. Physicians from every neighboring town were sent to Sherman on special trains to help as many victims as possible. Most coming from Denison.

All vacant buildings on the public square, as well as city hall and the courthouse was turned into makeshift morgues and hospitals. However they were quickly overflowing with the dead and wounded, and multiple nearby office buildings were vacated to be turned into makeshift morgues. Many veterans stated the scene of devastation was unlike anything witnessed on a battlefield. All telephone and telegraph wires in the city were knocked out by both the tornado and the high winds the supercell produced, cutting communications to and from Sherman.

Residents of St. Louis, Missouri donated $1,600 (1896 USD) on May 20, with plans to donate at least $5,000 (1896 USD). However St. Louis was struck by a deadly tornado 7 days later.

== See also ==
- Jarrell tornado - A similarly powerful F5 tornado that struck Jarrell, Texas on May 27, 1997.
