= Sherman–Denison metropolitan area =

Sherman–Denison
- Metropolitan Statistical Area
- Sherman–Denison, TX; Metropolitan Statistical Area
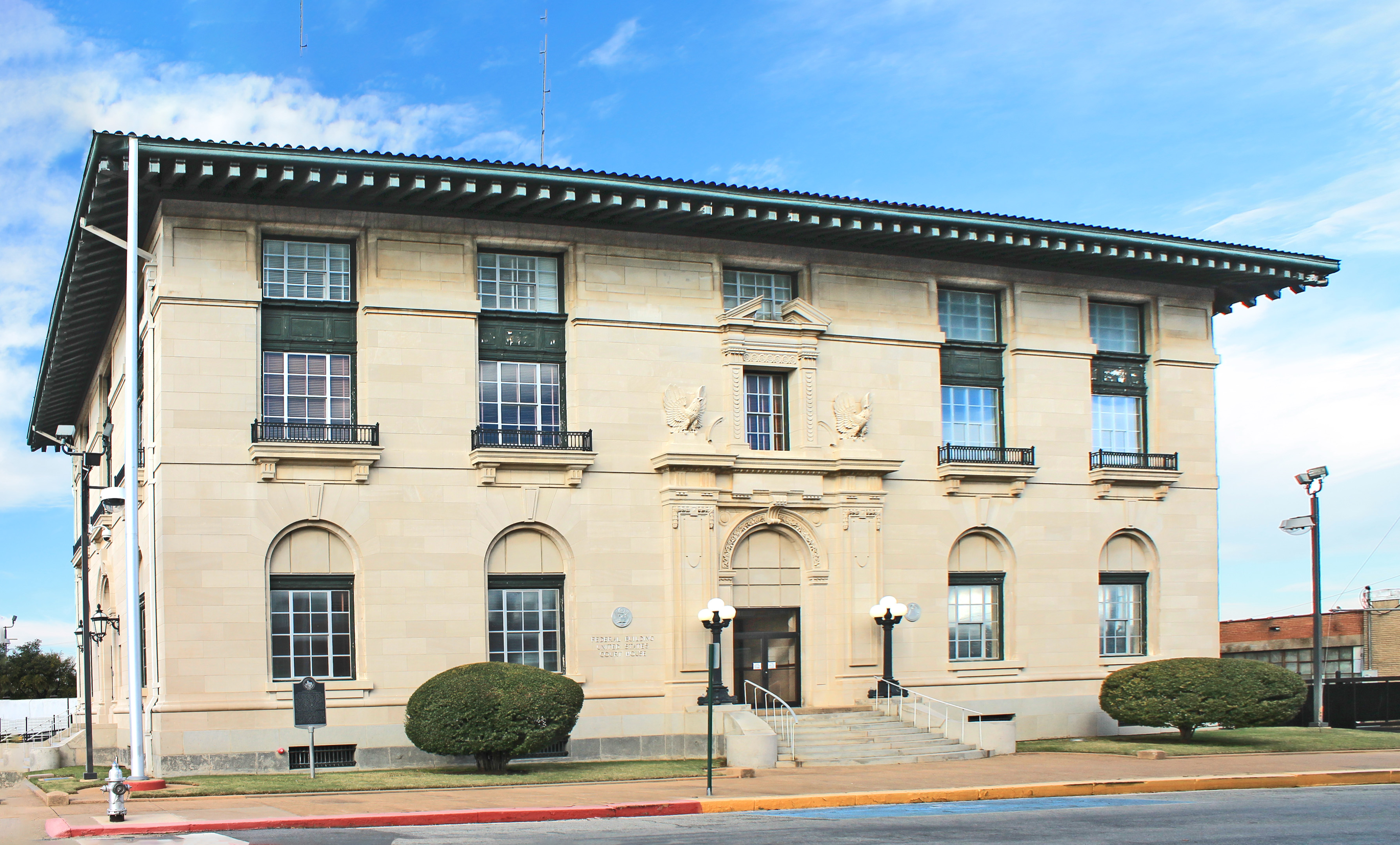
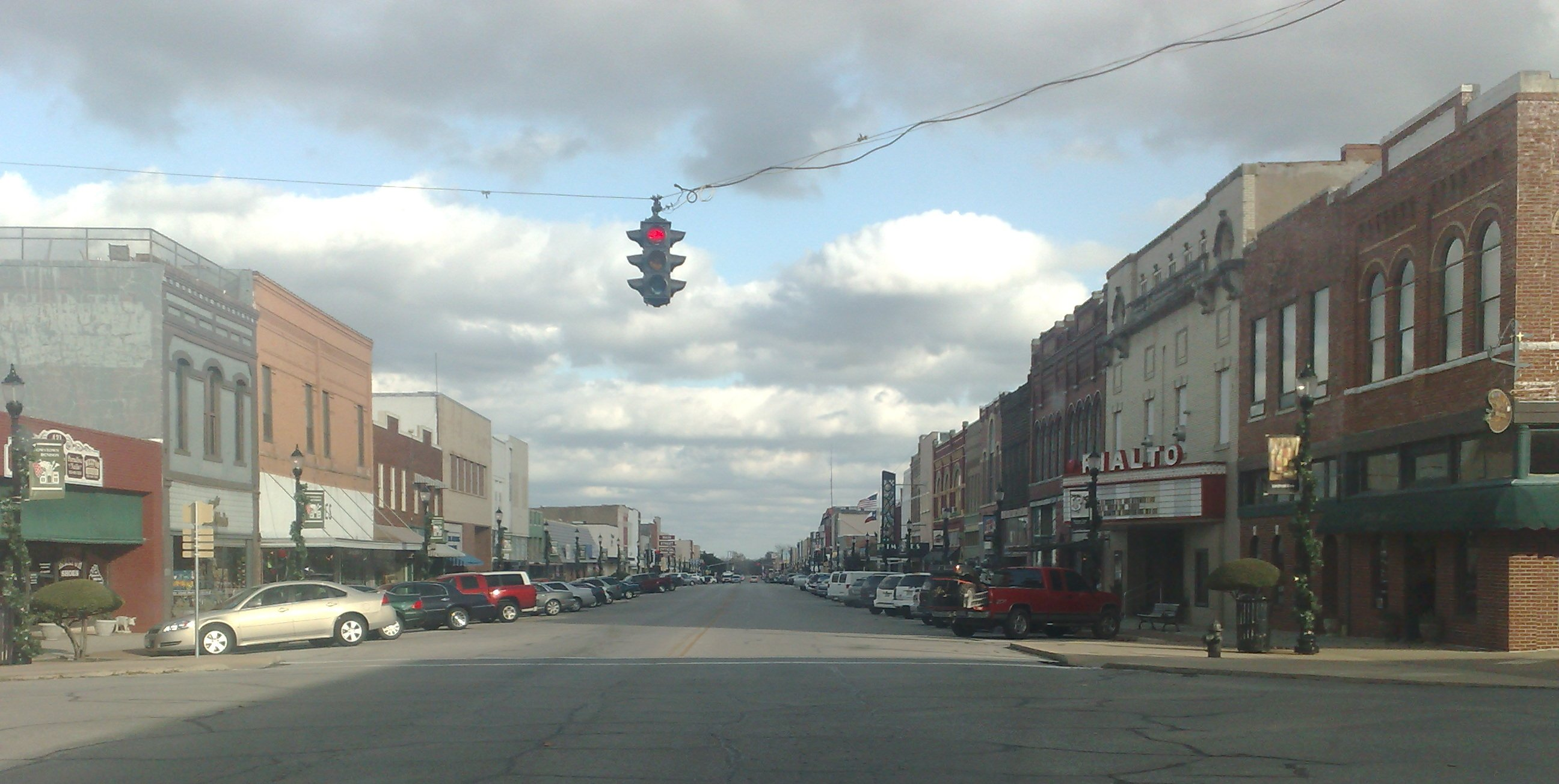
- Top: Paul Brown Courthouse in Sherman; Bottom: Downtown Denison
Interactive Map of Sherman–Denison, TX MSA
City of Sherman
City of Denison
Sherman–Denison, TX MSA
Other Counties in the Dallas–Fort Worth CSA
- Country: United States
- State: Texas
- Principal cities: Sherman; Denison

Area
  - Urban: 35.9 sq mi (93.1 km^{2})
  - Metro: 979 sq mi (2,536 km^{2})

Population (2010)
  - Density: 130/sq mi (50/km^{2})
  - Urban: 61,900 (US: 438th)
  - Urban density: 1,722.9/sq mi (665.2/km^{2})
  - MSA: 120,877
- Time zone: UTC-6 (CST)
  - Summer (DST): UTC-5 (CDT)

The Sherman–Denison metropolitan statistical area, as defined by the United States Census Bureau, is an area consisting of one county—Grayson—in North Texas, anchored by the cities of Sherman and Denison. According to the 2010 U.S. census, the MSA had a population of 120,877; according to 2021 estimates, it had a population of 139,336. The Sherman–Denison MSA is a component of the Dallas-Ft. Worth combined statistical area, which covers a 19-county area and had an estimated population of 8,057,796 as of July 1, 2009. It is also a major part of the Texoma region with proximity to both Lake Texoma and the Red River.

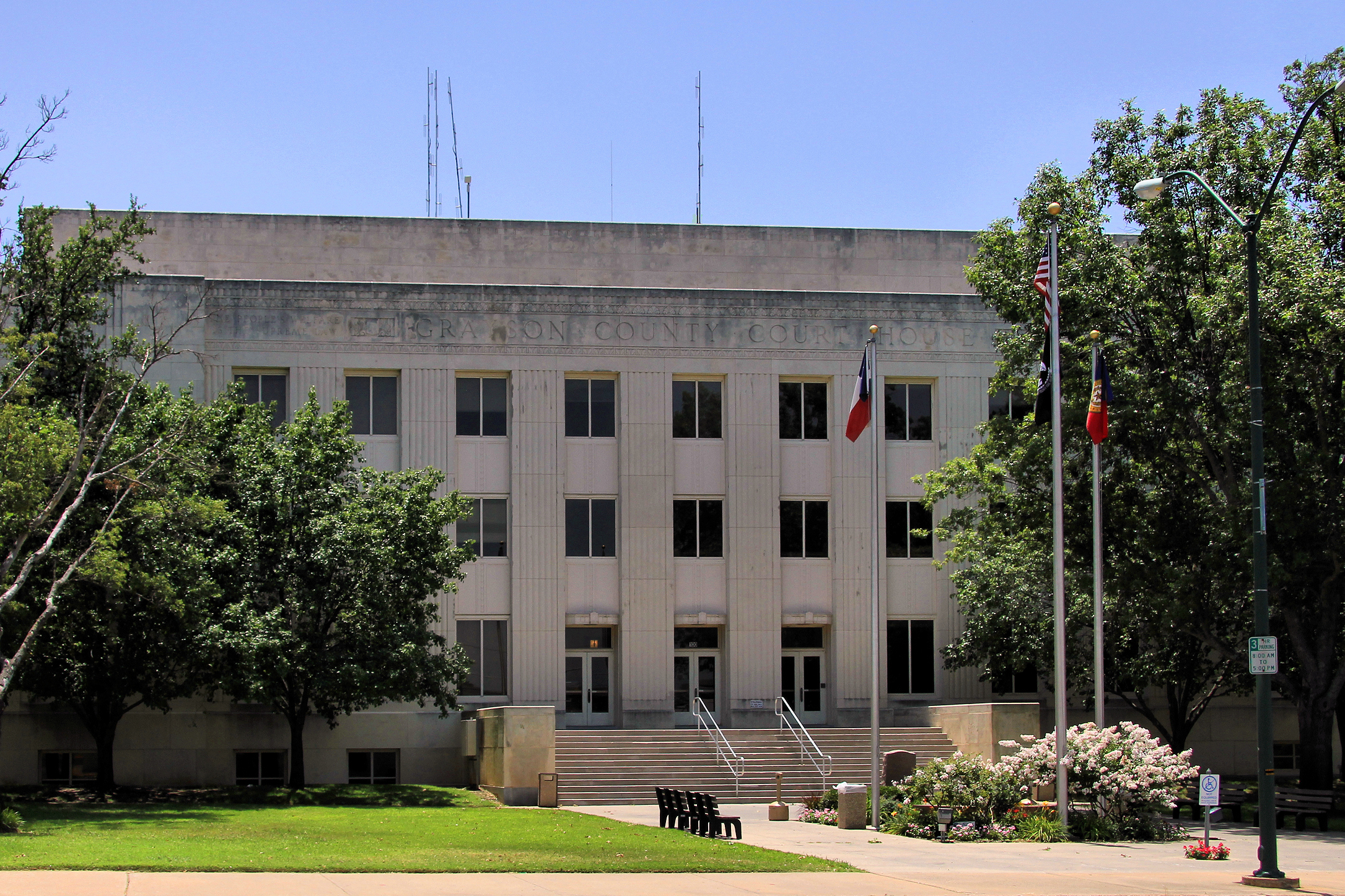
The Grayson County Courthouse in Sherman

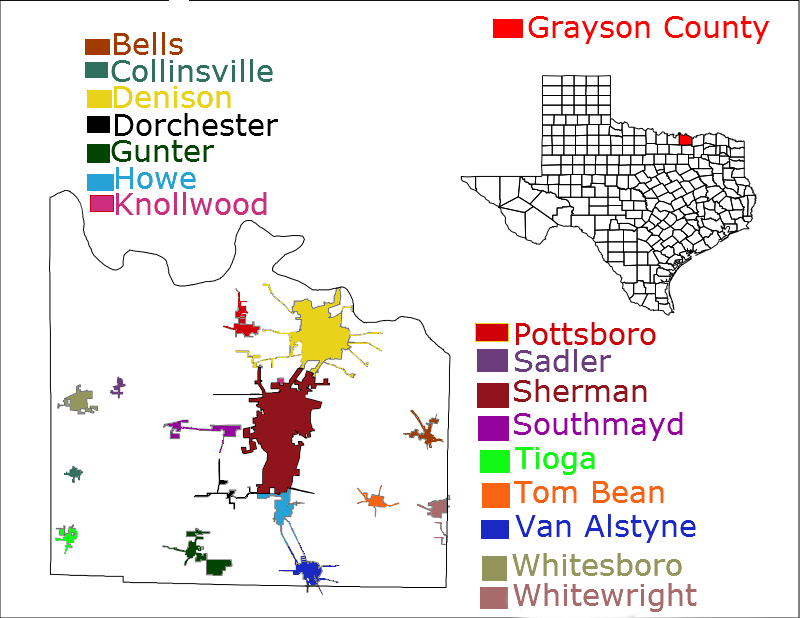
Map highlighting Grayson County and the cities within the Sherman–Denison metropolitan statistical area

== Communities ==
=== Places with 20,000 to 40,000 people ===
- Sherman (Principal city)
- Denison (Principal city)

=== Places with 2,500 to 5,000 people ===
- Whitesboro
- Howe
- Van Alstyne (partly in Collin County)

=== Places with 1,000 to 2,500 people ===
- Pottsboro
- Collinsville
- Whitewright (partly in Fannin County)
- Gunter
- Bells
- Tom Bean

=== Places with fewer than 1,000 people ===
- Southmayd
- Tioga
- Sadler
- Knollwood
- Dorchester

=== Unincorporated places ===
- Ambrose
- Gordonville
- Luella

== Geography ==
According to the U.S. Census Bureau, the county has a total area of 979 square miles (2,540 km^{2}), of which 933 square miles (2,420 km^{2}) are land and 46 square miles (120 km^{2}) (4.7%) are covered by water.

=== Major highways ===
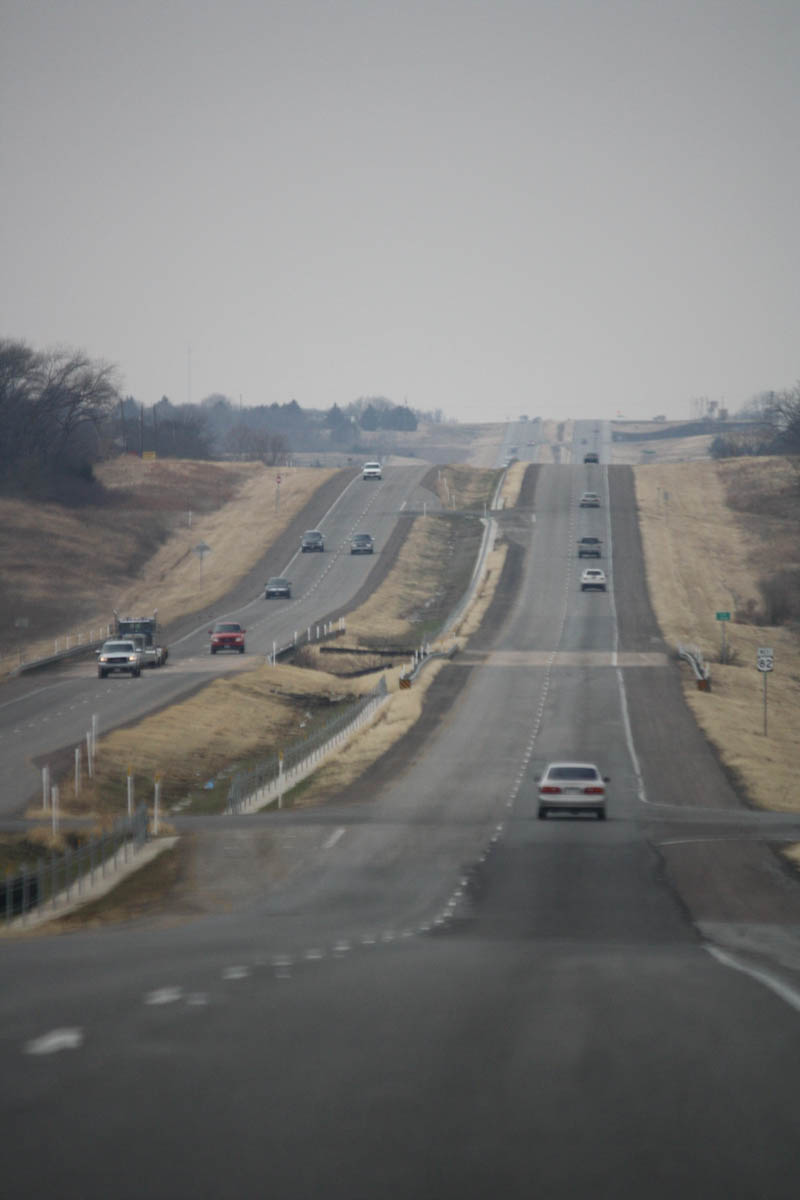
U.S. Route 82

- U.S. Highway 69
- U.S. Highway 75
- U.S. Highway 82
- U.S. Highway 377
- State Highway 5
- State Highway 11
- State Highway 56
- State Highway 91
- State Highway 160
- State Highway 289
- Spur 503

== Demographics ==
Historical population
Census	Pop.	Note	%±
1850	2,008		—
1860	8,184		307.6%
1870	14,387		75.8%
1880	38,108		164.9%
1890	53,211		39.6%
1900	63,661		19.6%
1910	65,996		3.7%
1920	74,165		12.4%
1930	65,843		−11.2%
1940	69,499		5.6%
1950	70,467		1.4%
1960	73,043		3.7%
1970	83,225		13.9%
1980	89,796		7.9%
1990	95,021		5.8%
2000	110,595		16.4%
2010	120,877		9.3%
2020	135,543		12.1%
2022 (est.)	143,141		5.6%
U.S. Decennial Census; 1850–2010

As of the census of 2000, 110,595 people, 42,849 households, and 30,208 families were residing in the MSA. The population density was 118 people per square mile (46 people/km^{2}). By the 2021 American Community Survey, the metropolitan area's population grew to 139,336. In 2021, the MSA's population had a median age of 40.7, and a sex ratio of 51% females and 49% males.

Per the 2021 census estimates, the racial and ethnic composition of the MSA was 73% White, 6% African American, 3% Asian, 4% multiracial, and 15% Hispanic or Latino. Among its population, the median household income was $62,919 with a per capita income of $32,249. An estimated 10.4% of the MSA lived at or below the poverty line.

There were 56,005 households in 2021, with an average of 2.5 people per household. Throughout the area, there were 60,035 housing units and 67% were owner-occupied. The median value of an owner-occupied housing unit was $222,900, with 17% of its inventory under $100,000.

== Media ==
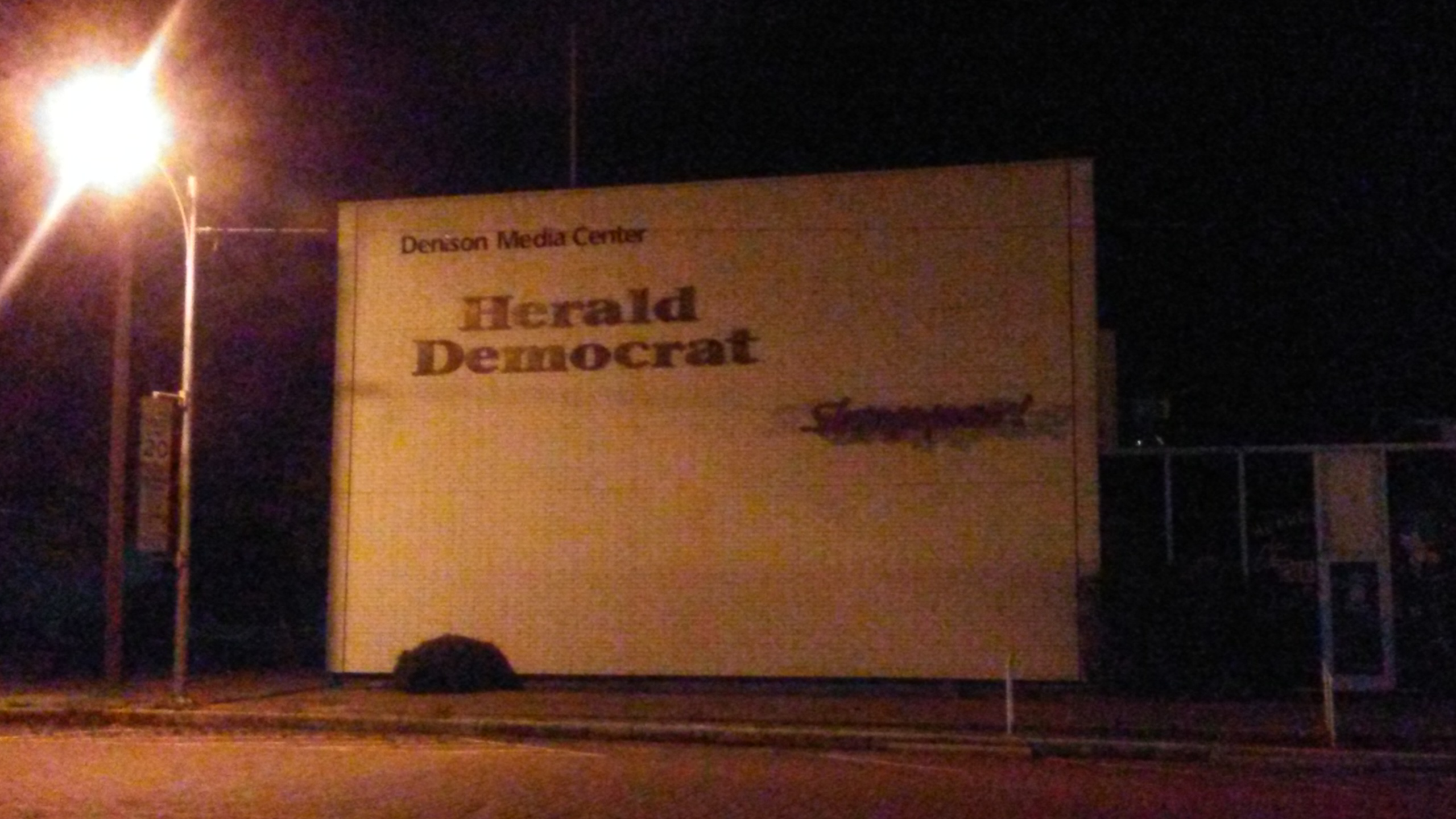
A Herald Democrat location in downtown Denison

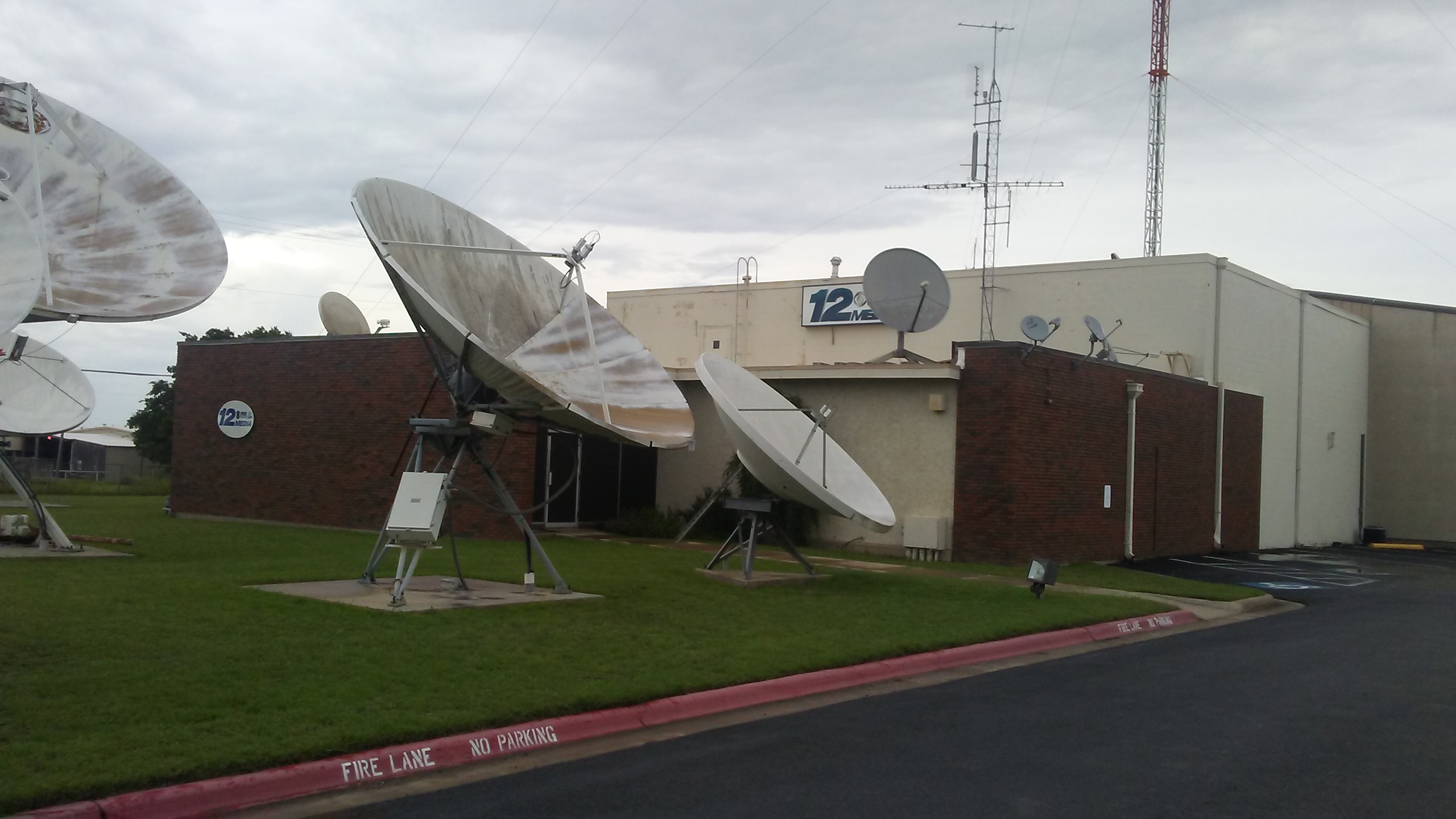
KXII television studio in Sherman

=== Magazine ===
- Grayson Magazine

=== Newspaper ===
- The Herald Democrat

=== Radio stations ===
- KLAK Adult Contemporary 97.5 K-LAKE FM
- KCBN 102.5
- KMKT Katy Country 93.1
- KQDR Hot 107.3 FM

=== Television stations ===
- KTEN Channel 10 - (NBC)
- KTEN DT Channel 10.2 - (The CW Texoma)
- KTEN DT Channel 10.3 - (ABC)
- KXII Channel 12 - (CBS)QF
- KXII DT Channel 12.2 (My Texoma)
- KXII DT Channel 12.3 (Fox Texoma)

== Higher education ==
School	Enrollment	Location	Type	Mascot	Athletic Affiliation (Conference)
Austin College	1,224	Sherman	Private liberal arts college	Roos	NCAA Division III (SCAC); Compete in the Southern Athletic Association for football
Grayson College	5,000	Denison	Community college	Vikings	NJCAA (NTJCAC); Baseball and Softball only

Also, Southeastern Oklahoma State University (SOSU) in Durant is within a 30-minute drive from the area. SOSU is the closest Public university to the area.

== Top employers ==
#	Employer	Employees	Location
1	Tyson Foods	1400	Sherman
2	Texoma Health Systems	1375	Denison
3	Texas Instruments	1200	Sherman
4	Cigna	1000	Denison
5	Wilson N Jones Health Systems	1000	Sherman

== Infrastructure ==
=== Health care ===
Hospital	Number of Beds	Emergency Care	Location	Founded
Texoma Medical Center	414	Level II	Denison	1965
Wilson N. Jones Regional Medical Center	237	Level III	Sherman	1914

=== Transportation ===
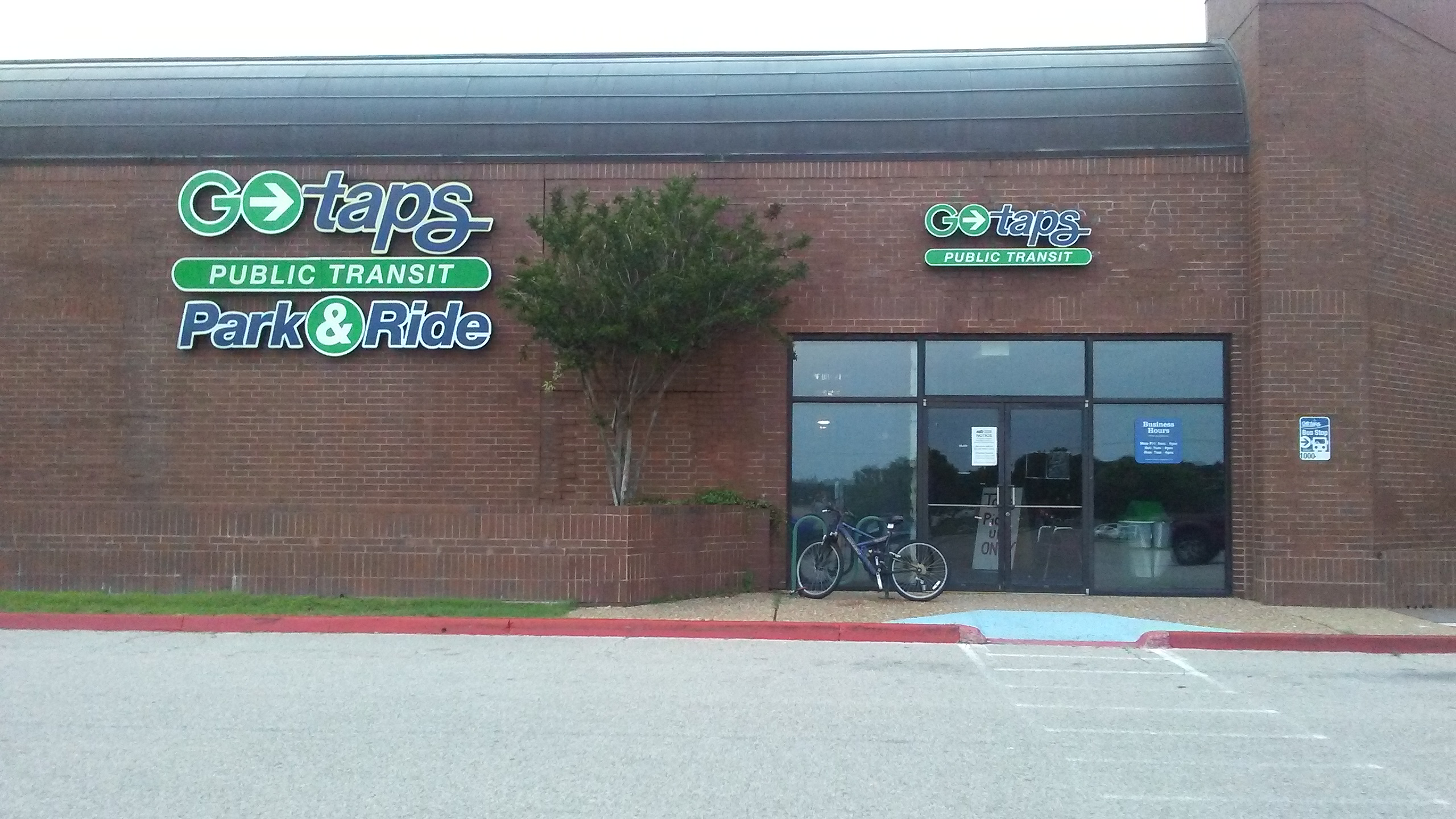
A TAPS pickup station at Midway Mall in Sherman

A public bus transit called 'Taps' serves the Sherman-Denison Metroplex as well as the North Texas Region and even extends into part of Oklahoma. The company is a regional transit agency that serves the Texoma region. Two major routes run through the Sherman-Denison metroplex, one known as the Viking route because it is funded by Grayson County College and the other is known as the Roo Route and is funded by Austin College. In addition to this both Sherman and Denison each are served by a 24-hour cab service.

=== Airports ===
There are two local airports, North Texas Regional Airport (formerly Perrin Air Force Base prior to 1971) and Sherman Municipal Airport. Both airports serve general aviation. The closest airport with airline service is Dallas/Fort Worth International Airport, it is a one-hour road journey south of the area.

== Attractions ==
=== Lake Texoma ===
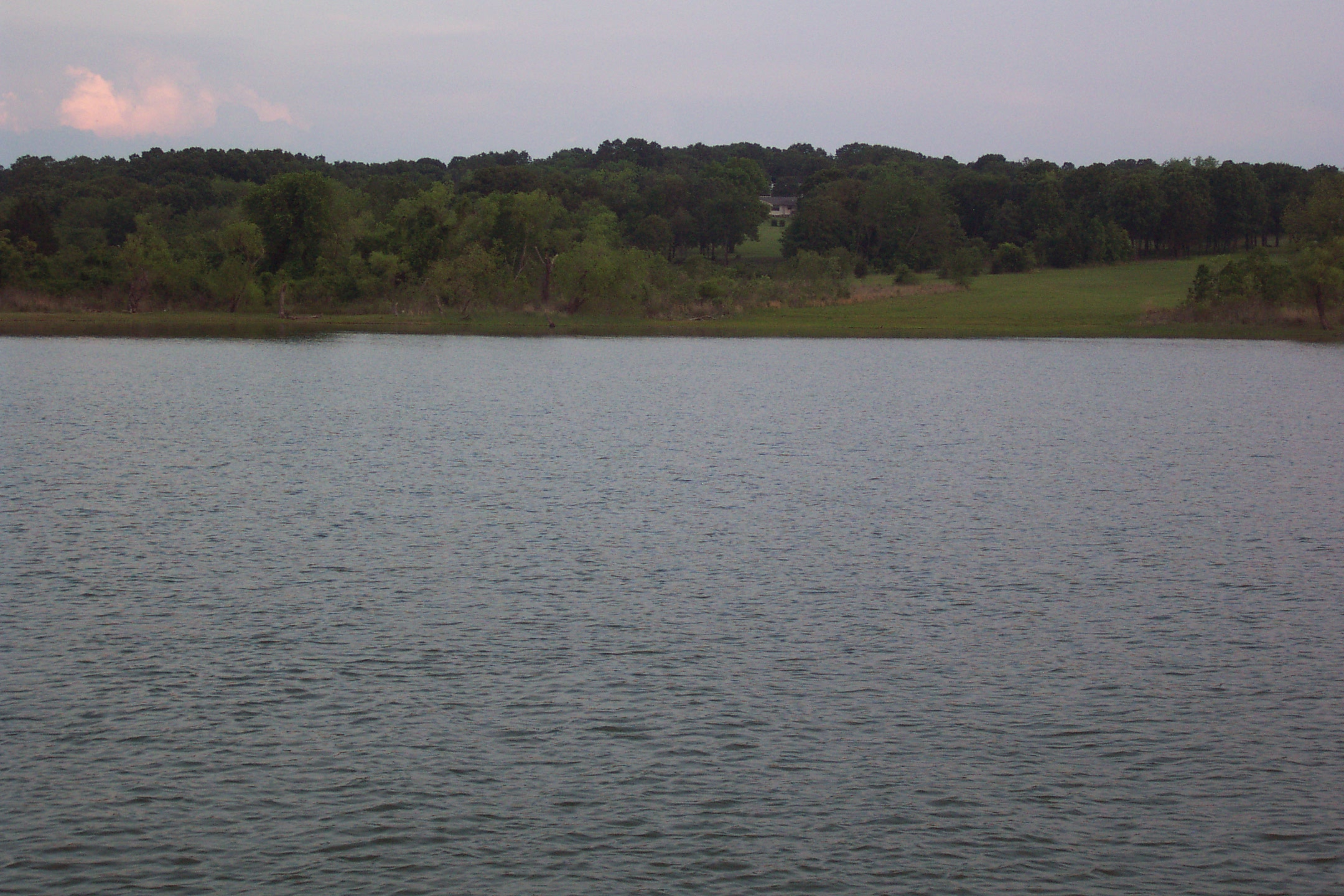
Lake Texoma

Lake Texoma is one of the largest reservoirs in the United States, the 12th largest US Army Corps of Engineers' (USACE) lake, and the largest in USACE Tulsa District. Lake Texoma is formed by Denison Dam on the Red River in Bryan County, Oklahoma, and Grayson County, Texas, about 726 miles (1,168 km) upstream from the mouth of the river. It is located at the confluence of the Red River and Washita Rivers. The damsite is approximately 5 miles (8.0 km) northwest of Denison, Texas, and 15 miles (24 km) southwest of Durant, Oklahoma. Lake Texoma is the most developed and most popular lake within the USACE Tulsa District, attracting approximately 6 million visitors a year.

Diverse recreational opportunities include two wildlife refuges, two state parks, fifty four USACE-managed parks, twelve marinas, twenty-six resorts, hundreds of campgrounds and a variety of excellent golf courses. Power boating, sailing, personal watercraft, water skiing and wind surfing are all popular. The lake has become a major sailing center based on its size, depth and miles of sailing shoreline.

During the spring break and Fourth of July holidays, many college students home for the holidays will gather in an area called "Fobb Bottom" on the Oklahoma side.

Lake Texoma is also home to the Lakefest Regatta, widely considered to be the first inland charity regatta in the United States. The event typically attracts up to 100 keelboats and more than 500 sailors each spring. Since its inception, Lakefest has raised more than $2 million in support of various children's charities in North Texas. The current beneficiary is the Make-A-Wish Foundation® of North Texas.

Former professional Funny Car race driver "Flash" Gordon Mineo organized many "Poker Run" events on Lake Texoma.

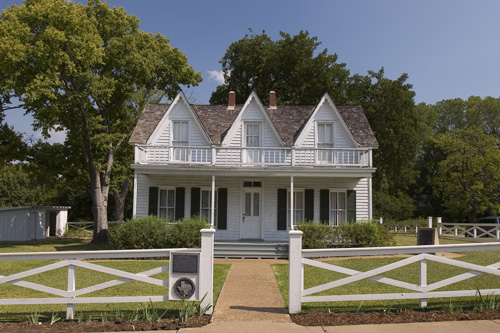
Eisenhower Birthplace State Historic Site in 2009

The lake was stocked with striped bass in the late 1960s, and has proven to be an excellent habitat for them. It is one of the seven U.S. inland lakes where the striped bass reproduce naturally, instead of being farmed and released into the waters. The "stripers" feed on large schools of shad, and often reach sizes of 12 to 20 pounds (5.4 to 9.1 kilograms), with a lake record of 35.12 pounds (15.93 kg) caught April 25, 1984. The town of Kingston, Oklahoma, celebrates the importance of striper fishing to the local area with the annual Kingston Striper Festival each September.

In 2004, a blue catfish was pulled from the lake that weighed 121.5 pounds (55.1 kg), temporarily setting a world weight record for rod-and-reel-caught catfish. The fish was moved to a freshwater aquarium in Athens, Texas. More commonly, catfish in Lake Texoma weigh between 5 and 70 pounds (2.3 and 31.8 kilograms).

Historically, Texas and Oklahoma have not had a reciprocal fishing license agreement, which has posed a problem for anglers. Recent boundary resolutions have given Oklahoma jurisdiction over most of the fishing in Lake Texoma. An Oklahoma fishing license allows fishing most of the lake, up to within 400 yards (370 m) of Denison Dam. To fish the entire lake, a Lake Texoma fishing license is also available.

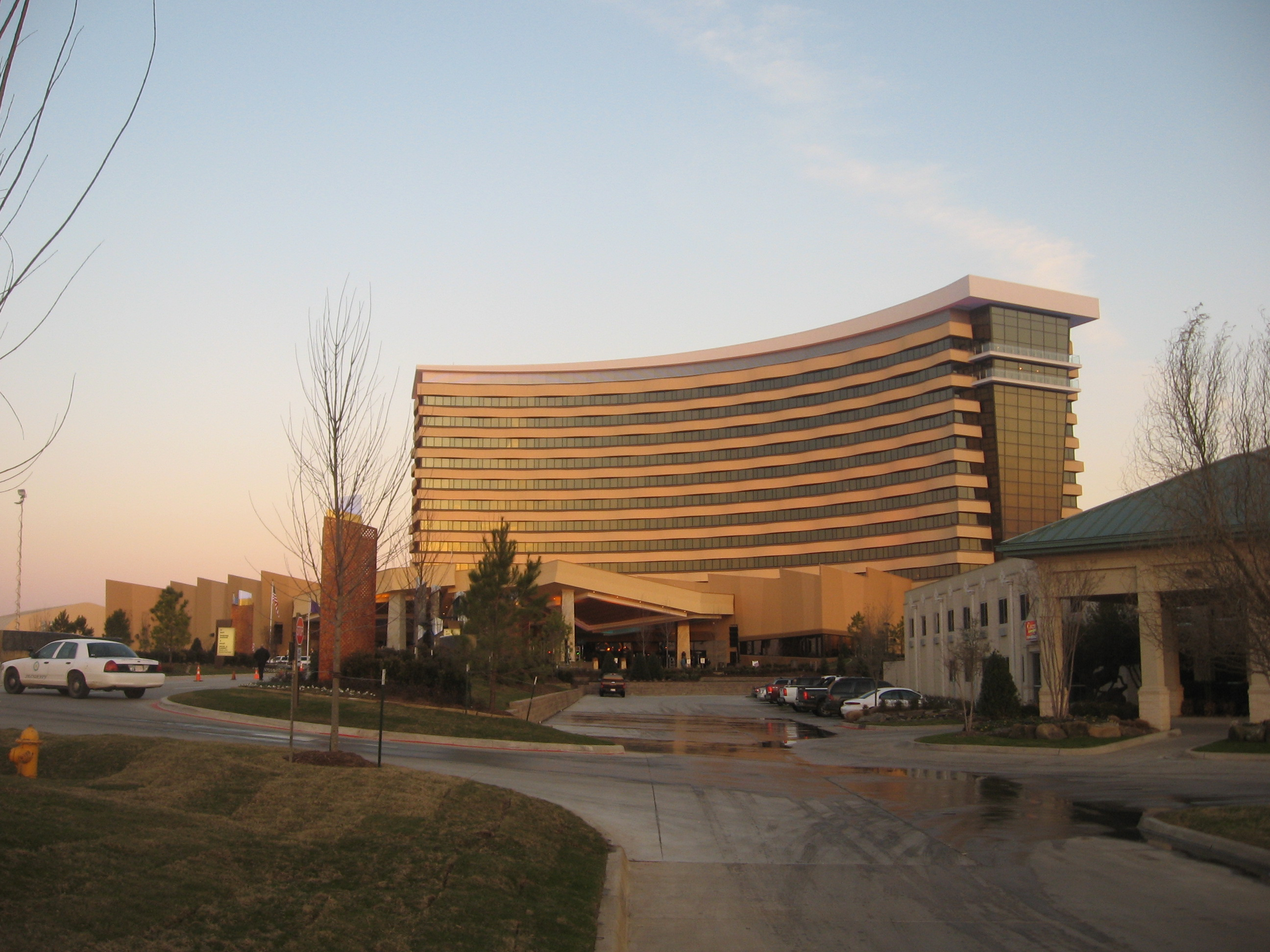
Choctaw Casino Resort

Many campgrounds, both public and private exist along the shores of Lake Texoma. Among these are Eisenhower State Park, named for President Dwight Eisenhower, who was born in nearby Denison, TX and Camp All Saints owned by the Episcopal Diocese of Dallas.

=== Dwight D. Eisenhower birthplace ===
President Dwight D. Eisenhower was born in Denison, Texas on October 14, 1890, the first United States President to be born in Texas. The Eisenhower Birthplace State Historic Site has been turned into a historical museum in Denison and is a very popular tourism site in the area.

=== Choctaw Casino Resort ===
The Choctaw Casino Resort is a casino and hotel complex located in Durant, Oklahoma roughly 20 minutes from Denison and 30 minutes from Sherman. The complex has 218,844 sq ft (20,331.3 m^{2}) of gaming floor, over 4,200 slot machines, a total of 776 hotel rooms, and is owned and operated by the Choctaw Nation of Oklahoma. The resort has two casinos and two hotels within the complex. The South Casino was completed in 2006 with 108,844 sq ft (10,111.9 m^{2}) of floor space, and the North Casino was completed in 2010 with 110,000 sq ft (10,000 m^{2}) more floor space. Choctaw Inn has 101 hotel rooms, and the newer Grand Tower has 204,000 sq ft (19,000 m^{2}) of floor space, 330 rooms and suites, and is 12 floors tall. The $360 million resort is the flagship of the Choctaw Nation gaming industry.

== See also ==
- Texas census statistical areas
