= Luella, Texas =

- Unincorporated community
- Location within Texas Location within the United States
- Coordinates: 33°34′10″N 96°33′04″W
- Country: United States
- State: Texas
- County: Grayson

Population (2000)
  - Unincorporated community: 639
  - Metro: 120,877
- Time zone: UTC-6 (Central (CST))
  - Summer (DST): UTC-5 (CDT)
- Area codes: 903, 430

Luella is an unincorporated community in Grayson County, Texas, United States. According to the Handbook of Texas, the community had an estimated population of 639 in 2000. It is part of the Sherman–Denison Metropolitan Statistical Area.

== Geography ==
Luella is located along State Highway 11 in central Grayson County, approximately four miles southeast of Sherman.

== History ==
=== Early years ===
Luella's history dates back to the 1880s. In 1888, the tracks of the St. Louis Southwestern Railway reached the area. Businessman J.L. Hughes built a general merchandise store combined with a railroad station. He applied for and established a post office branch under the name Luella, after his oldest daughter. Soon after, Luella boasted a number of businesses as well as a public school that also functioned as a community center. Besides freight, the railroad – also known as the Cotton Belt Line, ran a daily passenger trolley from Sherman (through Luella) to Commerce and back. By 1914, the community was home to around fifty people. Luella remained small and went into decline in the 1920s. The post office closed in 1924 and train service was discontinued in the early 1950s. Grayson County purchased the railroad right-of-way and the dirt lane next to the tracks became Farm to Market Road 1281.

=== Revitalization ===
In 1964, the Luella Water Supply District was created by fifty area residents who each contributed $50 to the project. This infrastructure improvement revived the once declining community and its status as a lightly populated area near Sherman made the area attractive to developers. Four subdivisions – Luella Heights, Chamberlain Ridge, Golden Acres, and Highland Meadows, were constructed in the Luella area during the 1970s. Each subdivision offered country-style living and homes on large lots.

=== Incorporation ===
Although Luella was an unincorporated community, it was located in Sherman's Extraterritorial jurisdiction (ETJ). After Sherman began drilling several wells in the Luella area, rumors of an impending annexation spread throughout the community. There were fears that annexation into the city would not bring the level of city serves to Luella that were enjoyed by other Sherman residents. A movement to incorporate Luella was initiated and on April 11, 1978, an election was held to determine the community's future status. Of the 99 votes cast, 89 were cast in favor of incorporation. Residents also elected a mayor, J.C. Rich, and a five-member town council. In the 1980 census, Luella's population was 371.

After incorporation, the town government was able to provide basic services, such as road maintenance. As the years passed, however, the funds needed to properly run Luella weren't sufficient and road conditions in the town declined. The lack of funds came to a head when school bus drivers who carried students from Luella to Tom Bean refused to cross Watkins Road Bridge due to its poor condition. When heavy rains fell, it swelled the waters of Cedar Creek and flooded the bridge. School district officials knew that if it rained during the day, it would be impossible to return the children to their homes without detouring a long way around. Negotiations with the county to replace the bridge were unsuccessful. A grant from the state looked like a better deal, with an eighty-twenty percent split. But the construction costs ran over, and delays stretched the timetable far beyond its projected end. By the time it was finished, Luella was close to bankruptcy, and there were other bridges needing repair.

Mayor Dolores Bernhardt introduced a proposed tax increase that would have provided the necessary funding to maintain the roads, but which did not guarantee any other services.

=== Disincorporation ===
On May 1, 1993, 213 of the 312 registered voters in Luella turned out to again determine the future status of their town; a total of 128 people (60.1%) voted in favor of ending Luella's fifteen-year status as an incorporated community, while 85 (39.9%) wanted to remain incorporated.

Today, the former town exists as an unincorporated, bedroom community for nearby Sherman. Luella had an estimated population of 639 in 2000. The Luella Special Utility District provides water service to approximately 1,000 homes in the area.

== Education ==
Public education in the community of Luella is provided by the Tom Bean Independent School District. Zoned campuses include Tom Bean Elementary School (grades K-5), Tom Bean Middle School (grades 6-8), and Tom Bean High School (grades 9-12).
