= Bells Independent School District =

School district in Texas (U.S.)

Address
- 1550 Ole Ambrose Road Bells, TX, USA ESC Region 10
- Coordinates: 33°37′50″N 96°24′26″W

District information
- Type: Independent School District
- Motto: Learn, Work, Serve, Respect, Everyday.
- Grades: PK-12
- Established: 1904; 122 years ago
- Superintendent: Josh Weger
- Governing agency: Texas Education Agency
- Schools: 3
- NCES District ID: 4809780

Students and staff
- Students: 1014 (2025-26)
- Athletic conference: UIL Class AAA
- District mascot: Panthers
- Colors: Maroon & Gold

Other information
- Website: www.bellsisd.net

Bells Independent School District (Bells ISD, BISD) is a public school district based in Bells, Texas, United States. Covering 58 square miles in eastern Grayson County, the district serves the City of Bells and surrounding areas.

As of 2026, Bells ISD operates three campuses, including one high school, one middle school, and one elementary school. The district most recently received an A rating from the Texas Education Agency (TEA).

== Finances ==
As of the 2010–2011 school year, the appraised valuation of property in the district was $195,896,000. The maintenance tax rate was $0.117 and the bond tax rate was $0.028 per $100 of appraised valuation.

For the 2018–19 school year, the district had revenues of US$10.9 million and expenditures of US$15.3 million.

== Academic achievement ==
In 2011, the school district was rated "recognized" by the Texas Education Agency.

== Schools ==
- Bells High School (grades 9–12) (289 students, 2021–22)
- Pritchard Junior High (grades 6–8) (208 students, 2021–22)
- Bells Elementary (prekindergarten–grade 5) (388 students, 2021–22)

== See also ==
- List of school districts in Texas
