= Bobby Acosta =

American football coach (born c. 1976)

Current position
- Title: Offensive coordinator
- Team: Tom Bean HS (TX)

Biographical details
- Born: c. 1976 (age 49–50); Queens, New York, U.S.
- Education: Rowan University (2000)

Playing career
- 1996–1999: Rowan
- Position: Strong safety

Coaching career (HC unless noted)
- 2000–2001: Rowan (ST/DB)
- 2002–2004: Marlboro HS (NJ)
- 2005: Delaware (TE)
- 2006–2007: Monmouth Regional HS (NJ)
- 2008: TCNJ (WR)
- 2009–2012: TCNJ (OC)
- 2013: Widener
- 2014–2015: Syracuse (WR)
- 2016: Cornell (WR)
- 2017–2018: Bucknell (OC/QB)
- 2019: St. Scholastica (OC/WR)
- 2020: IMG Academy (FL)
- 2021–2022: Del Valle HS (TX)
- 2023: Arkansas–Pine Bluff (OC/QB)
- 2024: St. John Vianney HS (NJ)
- 2025–present: Tom Bean HS (TX) (OC)

Head coaching record
- Overall: 6–4 (college); 48–44 (high school)

Robert Acosta (born c. 1977) is an American college football coach. He is offensive coordinator for Tom Bean High School, a position he has held since 2025. He was the head football coach for Widener University in 2013, Marlboro High School from 2002 to 2004, Monmouth Regional High School from 2006 to 2007, IMG Academy in 2020, Del Valle High School from 2021 to 2022, and St. John Vianney High School in 2024. He also coached for Rowan, Delaware, TCNJ, Syracuse, Cornell, Bucknell, St. Scholastica, and Arkansas–Pine Bluff. He played college football for Rowan as a strong safety.

Players Acosta coached at TCNJ include Todd Kaiser, who played defensive back and quarterback for the Lions in 2009 and 2010. Several of Acosta’s former players have gone on to coach high school football in northern New Jersey, including Tony Carbone at Wood-Ridge High School and Brett Ressler at Hackensack High School.

== Head coaching record ==
=== College ===
Year	Team	Overall	Conference	Standing	Bowl/playoffs
Widener Pride (Middle Atlantic Conference) (2013)
2013	Widener	6–4	6–3	T–3rd	
Widener:		6–4	6–3		
Total:		6–4			

=== High school ===
Year	Team	Overall	Conference	Standing	Bowl/playoffs
Marlboro Mustangs () (2002–2004)
Marlboro:		14–16			
Monmouth Regional Falcons () (2006–2007)
2006	Monmouth Regional	8–3	5–1	1st	
2007	Monmouth Regional	5–5	2–4	5th	
Monmouth Regional:		13–8	7–5		
IMG Academy Ascenders () (2020)
2020	IMG Academy	8–0			
IMG Academy:		8–0			
Del Valle Cardinals () (2021–2022)
2021	Del Valle	2–8	2–5	T–5th	
2022	Del Valle	2–8	2–6	T–6th	
Del Valle:		4–16	4–11		
St. John Vianney Lancers () (2024)
2024	St. John Vianney	9–4	3–2	4th	
St. John Vianney:		9–4	3–2		
Total:		48–44			
National championship Conference title Conference division title or championship game berth
