= Tom Bean Independent School District =

School district in Texas

Address
- 100 Garner Street Tom Bean, TX, USA ESC Region 10
- Coordinates: 33°31′14″N 96°29′13″W

District information
- Type: Independent School District
- Grades: PK-12
- Superintendent: Steve Goodman
- Governing agency: Texas Education Agency
- Schools: 3
- NCES District ID: 4842930

Students and staff
- Students: 766 (2025-26)
- Athletic conference: UIL Class AA
- District mascot: Tomcats
- Colors: Orange & Black

Other information
- Website: www.tbisd.org

Tom Bean Independent School District (Tom Bean ISD, TBISD) is a public school district based in Tom Bean, Texas (USA). Covering 54 square miles in southeast Grayson County, Tom Bean ISD serves the City of Tom Bean, the community of Luella, and their surrounding areas.

As of 2026, Tom Bean ISD operates three campuses, including one high school, one middle school, and one elementary school. The district most recently received a B rating from the Texas Education Agency (TEA).

== Schools ==
- Tom Bean High School (Grades 9–12)
- Tom Bean Middle School (Grades 6–8)
- Tom Bean Elementary School (Grades K-5)
