= WNJ =

WNJ may refer to:

- Wilson N. Jones Regional Medical Center
- Weird NJ
- Warner Norcross & Judd
