= Texas State Highway 160 =

State highway in Texas

State Highway 160
- SH 160 highlighted in red

Route information
- Maintained by TxDOT
- Length: 8.893 mi (14.312 km)
- Existed: 1930–present

Major junctions
- South end: SH 78 near Westminster
- SH 121 near Westminster
- North end: US 69 / SH 11 in Whitewright

Location
- Country: United States
- State: Texas
- Counties: Collin, Grayson

Highway system
- Highways in Texas; Interstate; US; State; Former; Toll; Loops; Spurs; FM/RM; Park; Rec
← SH 159	→ SH 161

State Highway 160 (SH 160) is a Texas state highway that runs from SH 78 to U.S. Highway 69 and SH 11 in Whitewright. The route is about nine miles (14 km) in length. It was designated on March 19, 1930 along its current route, except that its north end was at Bells. It was a renumbering of SH 78A. On October 25, 1932, SH 160 was extended to Denison. On September 26, 1939, the part from Denison to Whitewright was cancelled as it was cosigned with US 69.

== Junction list ==
County	Location	mi	km	Destinations	Notes
Collin	Desert	0.0	0.0	SH 78 – Blue Ridge, Leonard	
Collin	Desert	0.5	0.80	SH 121 – Melissa, Trenton	
Grayson		3.5	5.6	FM 814 east / Knothole Road – Trenton	Western terminus of FM 814
Grayson		4.4	7.1	FM 121 west – Van Alstyne	Eastern terminus of FM 814
Grayson	Whitewright	8.9	14.3	US 69 / SH 11 – Bells, Sherman, Greenville	
1.000 mi = 1.609 km; 1.000 km = 0.621 mi
