= Knollwood, Texas =

- City
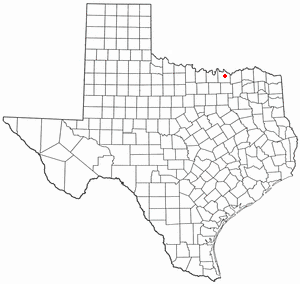
- Location of Knollwood, Texas

- Coordinates: 33°41′21″N 96°37′07″W
- Country: United States
- State: Texas
- County: Grayson

Area
  - Total: 0.33 sq mi (0.85 km^{2})
  - Land: 0.33 sq mi (0.85 km^{2})
  - Water: 0 sq mi (0.00 km^{2})
- Elevation: 830 ft (250 m)

Population (2020)
  - Total: 764
  - Density: 2,300/sq mi (900/km^{2})
- Time zone: UTC-6 (Central (CST))
  - Summer (DST): UTC-5 (CDT)
- Area codes: 903, 430
- FIPS code: 48-39680
- GNIS feature ID: 2413564
- Website: www.knollwoodvillage.com

Knollwood is a city in Grayson County, Texas, United States. The population was 764 at the 2020 census. It is part of the Sherman–Denison metropolitan statistical area.

== Geography ==
Knollwood is located in north-central Grayson County and is bordered to the south by the city of Sherman, the county seat.

According to the United States Census Bureau, Knollwood has a total area of 0.33 square miles (0.86 km^{2}), all land.

== Demographics ==
Historical population
Census	Pop.	Note	%±
1990	205		—
2000	375		82.9%
2010	432		15.2%
2020	764		76.9%
U.S. Decennial Census; 2020 Census

=== 2020 census ===
As of the 2020 census, Knollwood had a population of 764. The median age was 33.7 years. 16.4% of residents were under the age of 18 and 16.0% of residents were 65 years of age or older. For every 100 females there were 98.4 males, and for every 100 females age 18 and over there were 92.5 males age 18 and over.

100.0% of residents lived in urban areas, while 0.0% lived in rural areas.

There were 382 households in Knollwood, of which 19.9% had children under the age of 18 living in them. Of all households, 27.5% were married-couple households, 27.5% were households with a male householder and no spouse or partner present, and 36.1% were households with a female householder and no spouse or partner present. About 40.3% of all households were made up of individuals and 10.7% had someone living alone who was 65 years of age or older.

There were 406 housing units, of which 5.9% were vacant. The homeowner vacancy rate was 1.4% and the rental vacancy rate was 6.6%.

Racial composition as of the 2020 census
Race	Number	Percent
White	577	75.5%
Black or African American	52	6.8%
American Indian and Alaska Native	13	1.7%
Asian	19	2.5%
Native Hawaiian and Other Pacific Islander	1	0.1%
Some other race	51	6.7%
Two or more races	51	6.7%
Hispanic or Latino (of any race)	78	10.2%

=== 2000 census ===
At the 2000 census, 375 people, 143 households, and 91 families were residing in the city. The population density was 1,196.4 inhabitants per square mile (461.9/km^{2}). The 150 housing units averaged 478.6/sq mi (186.8/km^{2}). The racial makeup of the city was 87.73% White, 5.87% African American, 0.53% Native American, 1.07% Asian, 0.53% Pacific Islander, 3.20% from other races, and 1.07% from two or more races. Hispanics or Latinos of any race were 6.13% of the population.

Of the 143 households, 39.2% had children under the age of 18 living with them, 44.8% were married couples living together, 16.1% had a female householder with no husband present, and 35.7% were not families. About 28.0% of all households were made up of individuals, and 3.5% had someone living alone who was 65 years of age or older. The average household size was 2.62 and the average family size was 3.25.

The city's population was distributed as 31.5% under the age of 18, 11.2% from 18 to 24, 36.0% from 25 to 44, 17.6% from 45 to 64, and 3.7% who were 65 years of age or older. The median age was 28 years. For every 100 females, there were 94.3 males. For every 100 females age 18 and over, there were 81.0 males.

The median household income was $30,893 and the median family income was $32,813. Males had a median income of $21,125 and females $17,417. The per capita income for the city was $13,497. About 1.1% of families and 2.5% of the population were below the poverty line, including 1.9% of those under age 18 and 14.3% of those age 65 or over.

== Education ==
Knollwood is served by Sherman Independent School District.

== Climate ==
The climate in this area is characterized by hot, humid summers and generally mild to cool winters. According to the Köppen climate classification, Knollwood has a humid subtropical climate, Cfa on climate maps.
