= Tom Bean High School =

Location
- 7719 SH 11; Tom Bean, Texas 75489-0128; United States; 33.527546°N 96.497862°W

Information
- School type: Public high school
- School district: Tom Bean Independent School District
- Principal: Charles Nash
- Teaching staff: 22.15 (FTE)
- Grades: 9-12
- Enrollment: 193 (2023–2024)
- Student to teacher ratio: 8.71
- Colors: Black & Orange
- Athletics conference: UIL Class AA
- Mascot: Tomcat
- Website: tbhs.tbisd.org

Tom Bean High School is a public high school located in Tom Bean, Texas (USA). It is part of the Tom Bean Independent School District located in southeast Grayson County and classified as a 2A school by the UIL. In 2015, the school was rated "Met Standard" by the Texas Education Agency.

== Athletics ==
The Tom Bean Tomcats compete in these sports -

- Baseball
- Basketball
- Cross Country
- Football
- Golf
- Powerlifting
- Softball
- Tennis
- Track and Field
- Volleyball
