= Gunter, Texas =

- City
- Motto: "Tough People Win"
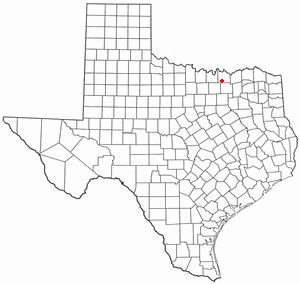
- Location of Gunter, Texas

- Coordinates: 33°27′05″N 96°46′40″W
- Country: United States
- State: Texas
- County: Grayson

Area
  - Total: 17.70 sq mi (45.85 km^{2})
  - Land: 17.59 sq mi (45.56 km^{2})
  - Water: 0.11 sq mi (0.29 km^{2})
- Elevation: 676 ft (206 m)

Population (2020)
  - Total: 2,060
  - Density: 95.2/sq mi (36.77/km^{2})
- Time zone: UTC-6 (Central (CST))
  - Summer (DST): UTC-5 (CDT)
- ZIP code: 75058
- Area codes: 903, 430
- FIPS code: 48-31616
- GNIS feature ID: 2410676
- Website: www.guntertx.gov

Gunter is a city in the southwestern corner of Grayson County, Texas, United States. The population was 2,060 at the 2020 census, up from 1,498 at the 2010 census. It is part of the Sherman–Denison metropolitan area.

== History ==
Gunter was founded in 1902 (other sources report 1901, with a post office as early as 1898) when the family of John (a/k/a Jot) Gunter deeded 328 acres (1.33 km^{2}) for the original townsite, near the intersection of current State Highway 289 and Farm to Market Road 121. The first residence was established in 1903 by Albert Earthman, who would later charter the First National Bank in Gunter. A second bank, the First State Bank, would later open.

Gunter steadily grew until 1924, when the First State Bank (having outlasted the First National Bank) closed, leaving many businesses and farmers in financial ruin. The Great Depression and two devastating fires in 1930 and 1948 further damaged the local economy.

Gunter began to increase its population in the 1950s, and experienced its greatest growth, at 37 percent, during the 1990s. Gunter has started to experience overflow growth from the northern Metroplex suburbs, due to its location on State Highway 289 approximately 10 miles (16 km) north of Celina, as well as its proximity to the Sherman-Denison metropolitan area and nearby Lake Texoma. In May 2002, a branch of Ada, Oklahoma-based Landmark Bank (now part of Simmons Bank) opened in Gunter, providing the town its first financial institution in nearly 90 years.

On May 19, 2004, two Burlington Northern rock freight trains collided head-on near Gunter. The wreck killed one of the engineers on one of the trains and injured the rest of the crew members.

== Geography ==
Gunter is located in southwestern Grayson County. State Highway 289 leads north 18 miles (29 km) to Sherman, the county seat, and south 10 miles (16 km) to Celina.

The city's boundaries expanded between 2000 and 2010. According to the United States Census Bureau, the city had a total area of 1.5 square miles (3.9 km^{2}), all land, in 2000, which had increased to 17.6 square miles (45.7 km^{2}) in 2010, of which 17.5 square miles (45.4 km^{2}) were land and 0.1 square miles (0.3 km^{2}), or 0.63%, were water.

=== Climate ===
The climate in this area is characterized by hot, humid summers and generally mild to cool winters. According to the Köppen Climate Classification system, Gunter has a humid subtropical climate, abbreviated "Cfa" on climate maps.

== Demographics ==
Historical population
Census	Pop.	Note	%±
1920	575		—
1930	475		−17.4%
1940	481		1.3%
1950	463		−3.7%
1960	593		28.1%
1970	647		9.1%
1980	849		31.2%
1990	898		5.8%
2000	1,230		37.0%
2010	1,498		21.8%
2020	2,060		37.5%
U.S. Decennial Census

=== 2020 census ===
As of the 2020 census, there were 2,060 people in Gunter; the median age was 33.7 years, with 32.8% of residents under the age of 18 and 10.3% of residents aged 65 or older. For every 100 females there were 95.1 males, and for every 100 females age 18 and over there were 90.5 males age 18 and over.

There were 645 households in Gunter, of which 52.4% had children under the age of 18 living in them. Of all households, 68.1% were married-couple households, 7.9% were households with a male householder and no spouse or partner present, and 19.5% were households with a female householder and no spouse or partner present. About 10.5% of all households were made up of individuals and 3.5% had someone living alone who was 65 years of age or older.

There were 673 housing units, of which 4.2% were vacant. The homeowner vacancy rate was 1.4% and the rental vacancy rate was 5.3%.

0.0% of residents lived in urban areas, while 100.0% lived in rural areas.

Racial composition as of the 2020 census
Race	Number	Percent
White	1,444	70.1%
Black or African American	31	1.5%
American Indian and Alaska Native	41	2.0%
Asian	18	0.9%
Native Hawaiian and Other Pacific Islander	0	0.0%
Some other race	232	11.3%
Two or more races	294	14.3%
Hispanic or Latino (of any race)	451	21.9%

== Government ==
Gunter is led by a six-person City Council, consisting of the Mayor and five members, all of which are elected at-large.

On December 12, 2023, all five of the at-large members resigned from their positions (and failed to appear at a scheduled City Council meeting the following night), leaving the Mayor as the only remaining member.

== Education ==
Students are served by the Gunter Independent School District.
