= Tom Bean, Texas =

- City
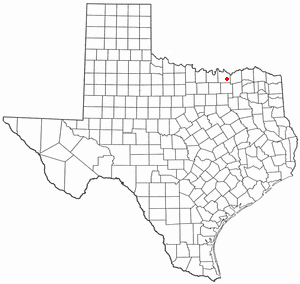
- Location of Tom Bean, Texas

- Coordinates: 33°31′25″N 96°29′40″W
- Country: United States
- State: Texas
- County: Grayson

Area
  - Total: 1.58 sq mi (4.08 km^{2})
  - Land: 1.58 sq mi (4.08 km^{2})
  - Water: 0 sq mi (0.00 km^{2})
- Elevation: 820 ft (250 m)

Population (2020)
  - Total: 930
  - Density: 590/sq mi (230/km^{2})
- Time zone: UTC-6 (Central (CST))
  - Summer (DST): UTC-5 (CDT)
- ZIP code: 75489
- Area codes: 903, 430
- FIPS code: 48-73328
- GNIS feature ID: 2412079
- Website: www.tombeantx.gov

Tom Bean is a city in Grayson County, Texas, United States. The population was 930 at the 2020 census, down from 1,045 at the 2010 census.

Tom Bean is part of the Sherman–Denison Metropolitan Statistical Area.

== History ==
On October 27, 1888, Tom Bean was founded on what was then a new branch of the Cotton Belt Railway between Commerce and Sherman, Texas.

The town was named by J.W. Pennell in honor of his friend Thomas C. Bean, who was a wealthy, eccentric land surveyor and donor of the land upon which the town was built. Bean, a bachelor who lived in Bonham, Fannin County, Texas owned a section of land at what ultimately became the town, and as an inducement for the railroad to build through that area, he donated land for the railroad right of way, and later 50 acres of land to be used for the townsite.

Bean died in 1887; the year the city of Tom Bean was informally established. Nearby Whitemound, which was bypassed by the railroad, lost its post office to Tom Bean in 1888; many Whitemound settlers subsequently vacated and moved to the new town where they established homes and businesses.

Mr. Bean's estate began to sell town lots surrounding the railroad in the 1890s. The city school was moved in 1891 from a one-room structure to a two-story building with an auditorium. Several Christian denominations, including the Church of Christ (1890), Baptist, Presbyterian, and Methodist, established churches in town.

J.B. Hindman was the first railroad agent, and a boxcar served as the first temporary depot until a more permanent one could be erected in February 1888.The original business district ran parallel to the railroad, but in 1906, three brick buildings were erected one block south of the railroad.

News from the time indicates that Tom Bean first voted to incorporate sometime in mid 1891. W.W.Arnold was elected as Tom Bean's first Mayor in 1893, and H.A.Sroufe was its first City Marshal. A city charter was signed in 1897, and the first mayor elected thereafter was Ice B. Reeves.

In the early days of the 20th century, the city boomed. Within a few years, it boasted a grain company, a furniture company, a drugstore, a newspaper called the Tom Bean Bulletin, a saloon, a dance hall, a movie theater, a justice court, a jail, and the Tom Bean social club.

As time progressed, the sharp increase in automobile travel and transport, and the decline of cotton as the principal crop of the area, led businesses to the larger cities of Denison and Sherman, the county seat.

Though never again the railroad boomtown of the late 19th and early 20th centuries, the community enjoyed a growth spurt in the 1950s and 1980s, celebrating its centennial in 1987.

Current growth is due to its proximity to nearby Sherman, 11 miles (18 km) to the northwest.

== Geography ==
Tom Bean is located in southeastern Grayson County 11 miles (18 km) southeast of Sherman, the county seat, and 25 miles (40 km) south of the Red River and the Oklahoma border. The region is colloquially referred to as the Sher-Den area or Texomaland—or just Texoma.

According to the United States Census Bureau, the city of Tom Bean has a total area of 1.6 square miles (4.1 km^{2}), all land.

== Demographics ==
Historical population
Census	Pop.	Note	%±
1900	299		—
1910	288		−3.7%
1920	367		27.4%
1930	333		−9.3%
1940	274		−17.7%
1950	286		4.4%
1960	403		40.9%
1970	540		34.0%
1980	811		50.2%
1990	827		2.0%
2000	941		13.8%
2010	1,045		11.1%
2020	930		−11.0%
U.S. Decennial Census

=== 2020 census ===
As of the 2020 census, Tom Bean had a population of 930, 373 households, and 289 families residing in the city.

The median age was 37.4 years. 26.9% of residents were under the age of 18 and 14.6% of residents were 65 years of age or older. For every 100 females there were 95.0 males, and for every 100 females age 18 and over there were 89.9 males age 18 and over.

0.0% of residents lived in urban areas, while 100.0% lived in rural areas.

There were 373 households in Tom Bean, of which 37.8% had children under the age of 18 living in them. Of all households, 51.2% were married-couple households, 16.4% were households with a male householder and no spouse or partner present, and 29.5% were households with a female householder and no spouse or partner present. About 23.9% of all households were made up of individuals and 13.1% had someone living alone who was 65 years of age or older.

There were 412 housing units, of which 9.5% were vacant. The homeowner vacancy rate was 4.8% and the rental vacancy rate was 4.2%.

Racial composition as of the 2020 census
Race	Number	Percent
White	805	86.6%
Black or African American	13	1.4%
American Indian and Alaska Native	24	2.6%
Asian	5	0.5%
Native Hawaiian and Other Pacific Islander	0	0.0%
Some other race	12	1.3%
Two or more races	71	7.6%
Hispanic or Latino (of any race)	64	6.9%

== Education ==
The City of Tom Bean is served by the Tom Bean Independent School District and home to the Tom Bean High School Tom Cats.
