= Bells, Texas =

- City
- Nicknames: Crossroads of Friendliness, The Big Grape
- Interactive map of Bells, Texas
- Coordinates: 33°37′31″N 96°24′30″W
- Country: United States
- State: Texas
- County: Grayson

Area
  - Total: 2.24 sq mi (5.80 km^{2})
  - Land: 2.24 sq mi (5.80 km^{2})
  - Water: 0 sq mi (0.00 km^{2})
- Elevation: 666 ft (203 m)

Population (2020)
  - Total: 1,521
  - Density: 679/sq mi (262/km^{2})
- Time zone: UTC-6 (Central (CST))
  - Summer (DST): UTC-5 (CDT)
- ZIP code: 75414
- Area codes: 903, 430
- FIPS code: 48-07420
- GNIS feature ID: 2411675
- Website: www.cityofbells.org

Bells is a city in Grayson County, Texas, United States. Its population was 1,521 at the 2020 census, up from 1,392 at the 2010 census. The city lies north of Dallas and is part of the Sherman–Denison metropolitan statistical area.

== History ==
Bells had its start in the early 1870s, when the railroad was extended to that point. According to local tradition, the ringing of church bells to greet the arrival of the railroad caused the name to be selected.

== Geography ==
Bells is located in eastern Grayson County, at the intersection of U.S. Route 69 and Texas State Highway 56. US 69 leads northwest 13 miles (21 km) to Denison and south 7 miles (11 km) to Whitewright, while Highway 56 leads west 12 miles (19 km) to Sherman, the Grayson County seat, and east 14 miles (23 km) to Bonham. U.S. Route 82, a four-lane freeway, passes through the northern part of Bells, also leading to Sherman and Bonham.

According to the United States Census Bureau, Bells has a total area of 2.2 square miles (5.7 km^{2}), all land.

== Demographics ==
Historical population
Census	Pop.	Note	%±
1880	65		—
1890	429		560.0%
1900	474		10.5%
1910	496		4.6%
1920	585		17.9%
1930	428		−26.8%
1940	454		6.1%
1950	614		35.2%
1960	707		15.1%
1970	778		10.0%
1980	846		8.7%
1990	962		13.7%
2000	1,190		23.7%
2010	1,392		17.0%
2020	1,521		9.3%
U.S. Decennial Census

Bells racial composition as of 2020 (NH = Non-Hispanic) (Note: Note: the US Census treats Hispanic/Latino as an ethnic category. This table excludes Latinos from the racial categories and assigns them to a separate category. Hispanics/Latinos can be of any race.)
Race	Number	Percentage
White (NH)	1,244	81.79%
Black or African American (NH)	18	1.18%
Native American or Alaska Native (NH)	23	1.51%
Asian (NH)	3	0.2%
Pacific Islander (NH)	5	0.33%
Some Other Race (NH)	9	0.59%
Multiracial (NH)	113	7.43%
Hispanic or Latino	106	6.97%
Total	1,521	

As of the 2020 United States census, 1,521 people, 673 households, and 475 families resided in the town.

== Education ==
The town is served by the Bells Independent School District, with an elementary, junior high, and high school.
