= Dorchester, Texas =

- City
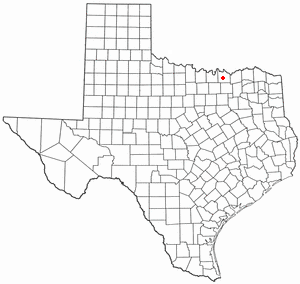
- Location of Dorchester, Texas

- Coordinates: 33°31′09″N 96°41′54″W
- Country: United States
- State: Texas
- County: Grayson

Area
  - Total: 1.31 sq mi (3.39 km^{2})
  - Land: 1.31 sq mi (3.39 km^{2})
  - Water: 0 sq mi (0.00 km^{2})
- Elevation: 827 ft (252 m)

Population (2020)
  - Total: 69
  - Density: 53/sq mi (20/km^{2})
- Time zone: UTC-6 (Central (CST))
  - Summer (DST): UTC-5 (CDT)
- ZIP code: 75459
- Area codes: 903, 430
- FIPS code: 48-20932
- GNIS feature ID: 2412441
- Website: https://cityofdorchester.org/

Dorchester is a city in Grayson County, Texas, United States. The population was 69 at the 2020 census, significantly down from 148 at the 2010 census. It is part of the Sherman–Denison Metropolitan Statistical Area.

== Geography ==
Dorchester is located in southern Grayson County 13 miles (21 km) southwest of Sherman, the county seat, and 30 miles (48 km) north of McKinney.

According to the United States Census Bureau, Dorchester has a total area of 1.6 square miles (4.2 km^{2}), all land.

== Demographics ==
Historical population
Census	Pop.	Note	%±
1980	205		—
1990	137		−33.2%
2000	109		−20.4%
2010	148		35.8%
2020	69		−53.4%
U.S. Decennial Census; 2020 Census

=== 2020 census ===
As of the 2020 census, Dorchester had a population of 69 and a median age of 37.1 years; 21.7% of residents were under the age of 18 and 17.4% were 65 years of age or older. For every 100 females there were 91.7 males, and for every 100 females age 18 and over there were 107.7 males age 18 and over.

0.0% of residents lived in urban areas, while 100.0% lived in rural areas.

There were 32 households in Dorchester, of which 46.9% had children under the age of 18 living in them. Of all households, 40.6% were married-couple households, 34.4% were households with a male householder and no spouse or partner present, and 18.8% were households with a female householder and no spouse or partner present. About 21.9% of all households were made up of individuals and 15.7% had someone living alone who was 65 years of age or older.

There were 32 housing units, of which 0.0% were vacant. The homeowner vacancy rate was 0.0% and the rental vacancy rate was 0.0%.

Racial composition as of the 2020 census
Race	Number	Percent
White	54	78.3%
Black or African American	0	0.0%
American Indian and Alaska Native	1	1.4%
Asian	2	2.9%
Native Hawaiian and Other Pacific Islander	0	0.0%
Some other race	9	13.0%
Two or more races	3	4.3%
Hispanic or Latino (of any race)	9	13.0%

=== 2000 census ===
As of the 2000 census, there were 109 people, 43 households, and 31 families residing in the city. The population density was 108.9 inhabitants per square mile (42.0/km^{2}). There were 47 housing units at an average density of 47.0 per square mile (18.1/km^{2}). The racial makeup of the city was 92.66% White and 7.34% from other races. Hispanic or Latino of any race were 11.01% of the population.

There were 43 households, out of which 37.2% had children under the age of 18 living with them, 65.1% were married couples living together, 2.3% had a female householder with no husband present, and 27.9% were non-families. 27.9% of all households were made up of individuals, and 11.6% had someone living alone who was 65 years of age or older. The average household size was 2.53 and the average family size was 3.13.

In the city, the population was spread out, with 31.2% under the age of 18, 5.5% from 18 to 24, 32.1% from 25 to 44, 22.0% from 45 to 64, and 9.2% who were 65 years of age or older. The median age was 34 years. For every 100 females, there were 94.6 males. For every 100 females age 18 and over, there were 102.7 males.

The median income for a household in the city was $45,000, and the median income for a family was $67,083. Males had a median income of $42,000 versus $26,750 for females. The per capita income for the city was $16,947. There were 9.7% of families and 7.9% of the population living below the poverty line, including 10.6% of under eighteens and none of those over 64.

== Education ==
Until 1959, Dorchester had its own school, originally built in 1902 (a state historical marker stands at the school's old location, next to the current home of the First Baptist Church of Dorchester). The high school closed in 1940, but the elementary school remained for nearly 20 more years, when the Dorchester school merged with the Howe Independent School District. The Howe district continues to educate students in the area today.
