= AHS Sherman Medical Center =

- American Healthcare Systems

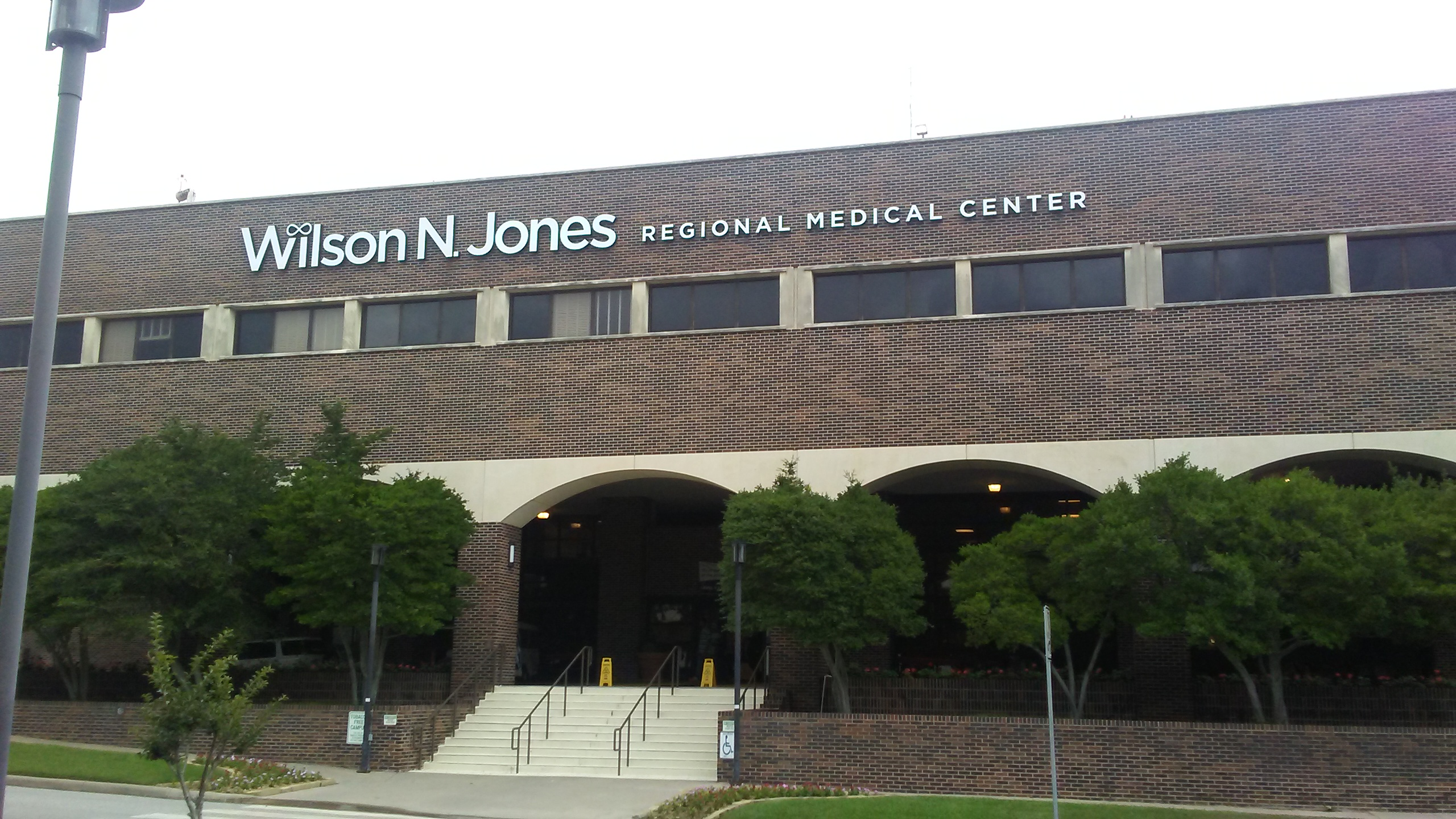
- Wilson N. Jones Regional Medical Center in Sherman

Geography
- Location: Sherman, Texas, United States
- Coordinates: 33.639°N 96.624°W

Services
- Emergency department: Level III trauma center
- Beds: 237

History
- Founded: 1914

Links
- Website: https://www.wnj.org
- Lists: Hospitals in Texas

The AHS Sherman Medical Center (formerly known as the Texas Health Presbyterian Hospital–WNJ and Wilson N. Jones Regional Medical Center) is a hospital in Sherman, Texas. Named for the Choctaw chief Wilson Nathaniel Jones (1827-1901), it has 237 beds, and employs 1000 staff. It was established in 1914.

In 2014, Alecto Healthcare Services acquired the hospital from Texas Health Resources.

In 2023, the hospital declared Chapter 11 bankruptcy. The hospital was bought by American Healthcare Systems in July 2023, promising to pay employees and bring in new equipment to the hospital. The hospital was renamed AHS Sherman Medical Center on March 19, 2024, with new signage being hung up.
