= Grayson County, Texas =

County in Texas, United States

- County
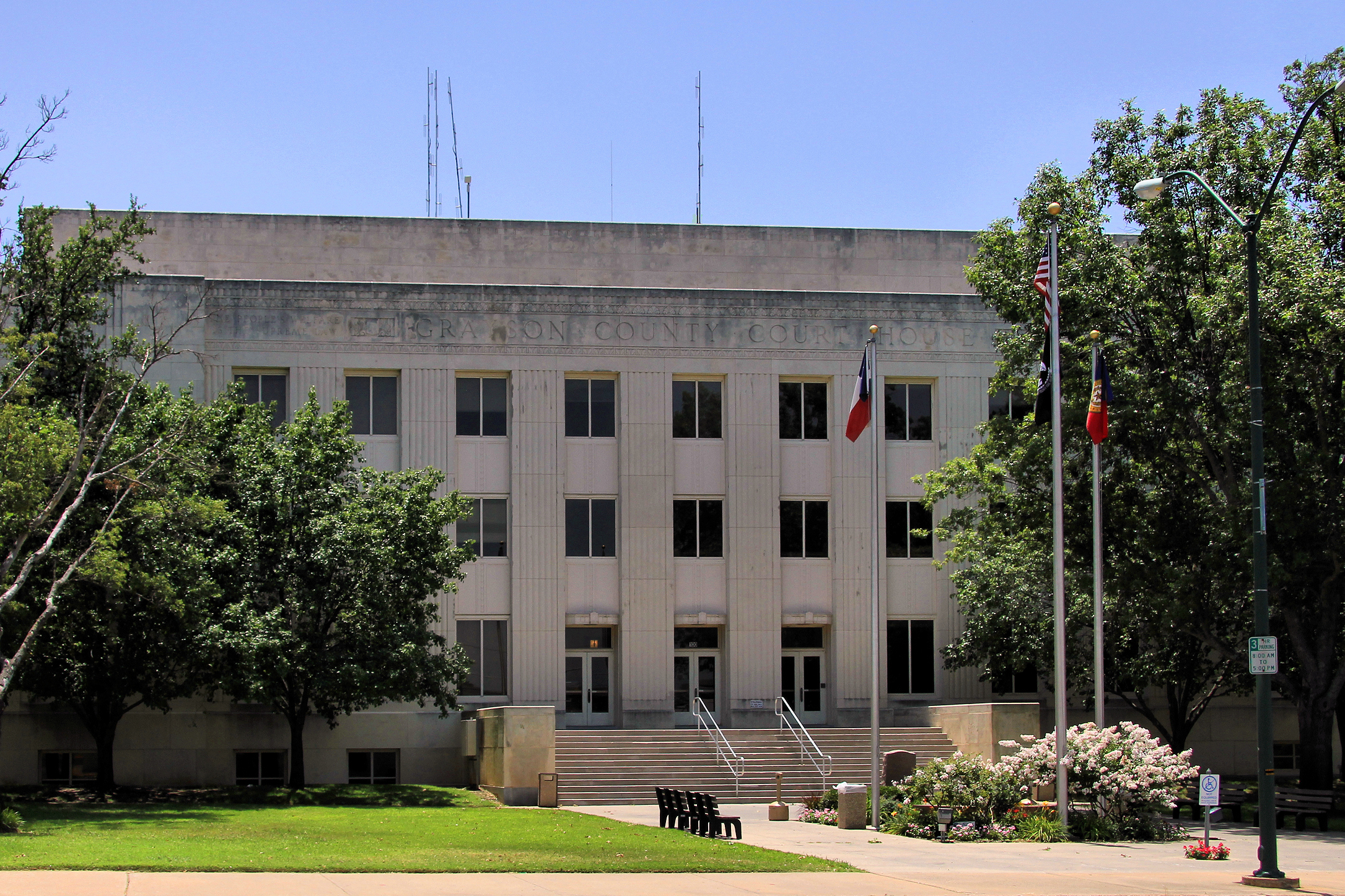
- The Grayson County Courthouse in Sherman

- Seal

- Location within the U.S. state of Texas
- Coordinates: 33°37′N 96°41′W
- Country: United States
- State: Texas
- Founded: 1846
- Named for: Peter W. Grayson
- Seat: Sherman
- Largest city: Sherman

Area
  - Total: 979 sq mi (2,540 km^{2})
  - Land: 933 sq mi (2,420 km^{2})
  - Water: 46 sq mi (120 km^{2}) 4.7%

Population (2020)
  - Total: 135,543
  - Estimate (2025): 153,613 ▲
  - Density: 145/sq mi (56.1/km^{2})
- Time zone: UTC−6 (Central)
  - Summer (DST): UTC−5 (CDT)
- Congressional district: 4th
- Website: www.co.grayson.tx.us

Grayson County is a county in the U.S. state of Texas. As of the 2020 census, its population was 135,543. The county seat is Sherman. The county was founded in 1846 and is named after Peter Wagener Grayson, an attorney general of the Republic of Texas. Grayson County is included in the Sherman-Denison metropolitan statistical area, which is also included in the Dallas-Fort Worth-Arlington, combined statistical area. Located on the state's border with Oklahoma, it is part of the Texoma region, with proximity to Lake Texoma and the Red River.

== History ==
The earliest known inhabitants of what is now Grayson County were Caddo Amerindian groups, including Tonkawa, Ionis, and Kichai. These groups engaged in agriculture and traded with Spanish and French colonists at trading posts along the Red River. Trading posts were established at Preston Bend on the Red River, Warren, and Pilot Grove during 1836 and 1837.

After the establishment of the Peters Colony in the early 1840s, settlement near the Red River increased. Grayson County was created from Fannin County by the Texas State Legislature on March 17, 1846. The county seat, Sherman, was also designated by the Texas State Legislature.

In the 1850s, trading and marketing at Preston Bend became more important, as agriculture expanded in the county. This was helped by Preston Road, the first trail in the state. It went from Preston Bend to Austin, Texas. More growth occurred after the establishment of Sherman as a station of the Butterfield Overland Mail route in 1856.

Opinions in the county about secession were divided. County residents voted by more than two to one in 1861 against secession, desiring to remain in the Union. The Great Hanging at Gainesville in nearby Cooke County in October 1862 was an attack on dissenters, men who were suspected of resisting conscription and having been Unionists. After 150-200 men were arrested by state troops, the military organized a so-called "Citizens Court", which had no basis in state law. Its jury made up its own rules and convicted and sentenced more than 25 men to death by hanging. Another 14 were lynched outright by a mob without even the cover of a trial. A total of 42 men were killed in the proceedings that month, considered the largest vigilante murders in U.S. history.

Violence continued for a time in Sherman and other towns of North Texas, at times at the hands of Confederate military. E. Junius Foster, the editor of the Patriot newspaper, was murdered in 1862 by Capt. Jim Young, son of Col. William Young, who had been killed in Cooke County. The senior Young had organized the Citizens Court that put so many men to death, and Foster had "applauded" Young's death. When other men were rounded up as suspect Unionists in Sherman, Brig. General James W. Throckmorton intervened and saved all but five who had already been lynched.

Men from Grayson County served the Confederacy at locations in the South. The 11th Texas Cavalry Regiment captured federal forts in the Indian Territory north of the Red River.

Grayson County and much of Texas suffered economic depression in the postwar years during the Reconstruction era, based in part on difficulties in reliance on agriculture in the South, adjustments to free labor, and other problems. The driving of cattle herds north along Preston Road provided needed income for the county during this period.

After the Houston & Texas Central (now UPRR) and Katy railroads began operating in the county in 1872, settlement in Grayson County picked up and flourished during the 1870s and 1880s. Cotton plantations were developed to cultivate this as the predominant commodity crop. Many towns, including Denison, Van Alstyne, Howe, Whitewright, Pottsboro, and Tom Bean, were founded during this time.

In 1879, a group of settlers who had settled in North Texas both before and after statehood came together in Grayson County for political discussions. They formed the Old Settlers Association of North Texas. The association accepted donations and purchased 26 acres. They continued to meet on an annual basis for many years.

On May 15, 1896, a tornado measuring F5 on the Fujita scale struck Sherman. The tornado's damage path was 400 yards (370 m) wide and 28 miles (45 km) long, and it killed 73 people and injured 200. Approximately 50 homes were destroyed, with 20 of them being obliterated.

=== 20th century to present ===
During the Sherman Riot of 1930 (May 9, 1930), Grayson County's 1876 courthouse was burned down by a white mob that rioted during the trial of George Hughes, an African-American man. When the riot started, Hughes was locked by police in the vault at the courthouse, and died in the fire. After rioters retrieved Hughes' body from the vault, they dragged it behind a car, hanged it, and set afire. Texas Ranger Frank Hamer was in Grayson County during this riot, and reported the situation to Texas Governor Dan Moody. Governor Moody sent National Guard troops to Grayson County on May 9 and more on May 10 to control the situation. Grayson County's current courthouse was completed in 1936.

The Bridge War, also called the Red River Bridge War or the Toll Bridge War, was a 1931 bloodless boundary conflict between the U.S. states of Oklahoma and Texas over an existing toll bridge and a new free bridge crossing the Red River between Grayson County, Texas, and Bryan County, Oklahoma.

In 1938, construction of a dam on the Red River was authorized by the United States Congress. The dam's construction was completed in part by the use of labor provided by German prisoners-of-war held at Camp Howze, in adjacent Cooke County during World War II. The dam is now known as Denison Dam. Lake Texoma was formed behind it and is used for recreation, irrigation, and electrical power generation.

Perrin Air Force Base was constructed in 1941. The base closure in 1971 was a blow to the county economy; however, the availability of skilled labor formerly associated with the base helped attract industrial plants. In addition, the base was converted to a civilian airport: North Texas Regional Airport - Perrin Field.

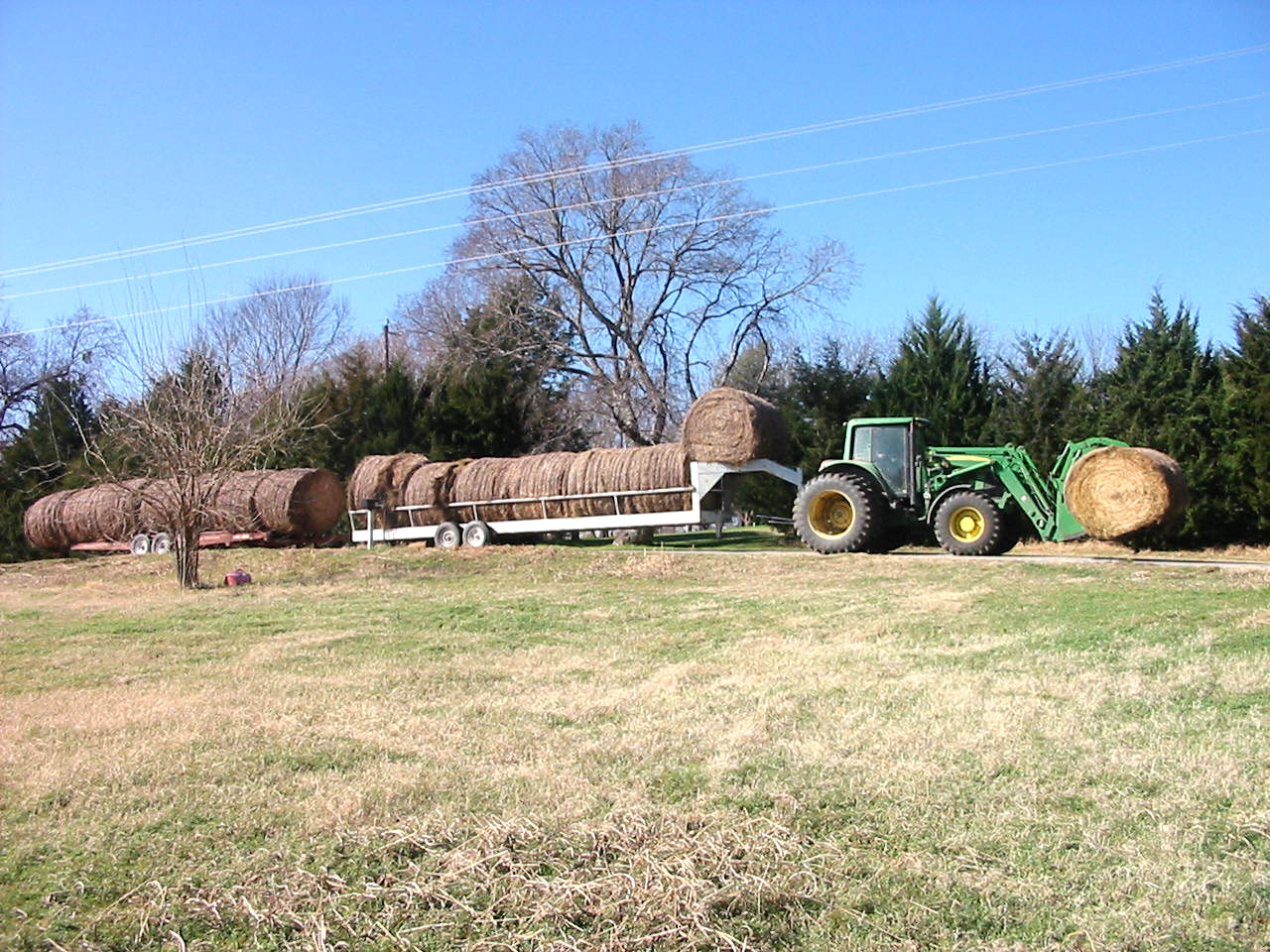
A rancher transports round bales of hay down a rural road in Grayson County, Texas: The economy of the county relies in part upon agriculture and ranchers.

The Eisenhower Birthplace State Historic Site, which is the birthplace of Dwight D. Eisenhower in Denison, was acquired and restored in 1952. Since 1993, the site is no longer maintained by the state, because of budget cuts, but it is maintained by a private nonprofit organization.

Grayson County is the only county in Texas where "deer may only be hunted with bows, no matter the season", according to an article by Thomas Phillips in the April 10, 2009, issue of Lone Star Outdoor News.

== Geography ==
According to the U.S. Census Bureau, the county has a total area of 979 sq mi (2,540 km^{2}), of which 933 sq mi (2,420 km^{2}) are land and 46 sq mi (120 km^{2}) (4.7%) are covered by water.

=== Major highways ===
- U.S. Highway 69
- U.S. Highway 75
- U.S. Highway 82
- U.S. Highway 377
- State Highway 5
- State Highway 11
- State Highway 56
- State Highway 91
- State Highway 160
- State Highway 289
- Spur 129
- Spur 316
- Spur 381
- Spur 503

=== Adjacent counties ===
- Marshall County, Oklahoma (north)
- Bryan County, Oklahoma (northeast)
- Fannin County (east)
- Collin County (south)
- Denton County (southwest)
- Cooke County (west)
- Love County, Oklahoma (northwest)

=== National protected area ===
- Hagerman National Wildlife Refuge

== Communities ==
=== Cities ===
- Bells
- Denison
- Dorchester
- Gunter
- Knollwood
- Pottsboro
- Sadler
- Sherman (county seat)
- Southmayd
- Trenton (mostly in Fannin)
- Van Alstyne (small part in Collin)
- Whitesboro

=== Towns ===
- Collinsville
- Howe
- Tioga
- Tom Bean
- Whitewright (small part in Fannin)

=== Census-designated places ===
- Preston
- Sherwood Shores

=== Unincorporated communities ===
- Ambrose
- Carpenter's Bluff
- Gordonville
- Luella

== Demographics ==
Historical population
Census	Pop.	Note	%±
1850	2,008		—
1860	8,184		307.6%
1870	14,387		75.8%
1880	38,108		164.9%
1890	53,211		39.6%
1900	63,661		19.6%
1910	65,996		3.7%
1920	74,165		12.4%
1930	65,843		−11.2%
1940	69,499		5.6%
1950	70,467		1.4%
1960	73,043		3.7%
1970	83,225		13.9%
1980	89,796		7.9%
1990	95,021		5.8%
2000	110,595		16.4%
2010	120,877		9.3%
2020	135,543		12.1%
2025 (est.)	153,613	▲	13.3%
U.S. Decennial Census; 1850–2010 2010 2020

=== Racial and ethnic composition ===
Grayson County, Texas – Racial and ethnic composition Note: the US Census treats Hispanic/Latino as an ethnic category. This table excludes Latinos from the racial categories and assigns them to a separate category. Hispanics/Latinos may be of any race.
Race / Ethnicity (NH = Non-Hispanic)	Pop 1980	Pop 1990	Pop 2000	Pop 2010	Pop 2020	% 1980	% 1990	% 2000	% 2010	% 2020
White alone (NH)	81,265	84,271	92,857	92,857	95,211	90.50%	88.69%	83.96%	83.96%	70.24%
Black or African American alone (NH)	6,286	6,511	6,385	6,385	7,448	7.00%	6.85%	5.77%	5.77%	5.49%
Native American or Alaska Native alone (NH)	629	1,012	1,314	1,314	1,876	0.70%	1.07%	1.19%	1.19%	1.38%
Asian alone (NH)	185	391	613	613	1,958	0.21%	0.41%	0.55%	0.55%	1.44%
Native Hawaiian or Pacific Islander alone (NH)	x	x	45	45	58	x	x	0.04%	0.04%	0.04%
Other race alone (NH)	82	41	34	34	348	0.09%	0.04%	0.03%	0.03%	0.26%
Mixed race or Multiracial (NH)	x	x	1,828	1,828	7,776	x	x	1.65%	1.65%	5.74%
Hispanic or Latino (any race)	1,349	2,795	7,519	7,519	20,868	1.50%	2.94%	6.80%	6.80%	15.40%
Total	89,796	95,021	110,595	110,595	135,543	100.00%	100.00%	100.00%	100.00%	100.00%

=== 2020 census ===
As of the 2020 census, the county had a population of 135,543. The median age was 40.2 years, 23.3% of residents were under the age of 18, and 18.6% of residents were 65 years of age or older. For every 100 females there were 95.4 males, and for every 100 females age 18 and over there were 92.5 males age 18 and over.

The racial makeup of the county was 73.7% White, 5.7% Black or African American, 1.8% American Indian and Alaska Native, 1.5% Asian, 0.1% Native Hawaiian and Pacific Islander, 7.0% from some other race, and 10.4% from two or more races. Hispanic or Latino residents of any race comprised 15.4% of the population.

The 2020 redistricting data also show 70.24% of the population were non-Hispanic white, 5.49% were non-Hispanic Black or African American, 1.38% were non-Hispanic Native American, 1.44% were non-Hispanic Asian American, 0.04% were non-Hispanic Pacific Islander, 0.26% were non-Hispanic some other race, 5.74% were non-Hispanic multiracial, and 15.40% were Hispanic or Latino of any race.

52.3% of residents lived in urban areas, while 47.7% lived in rural areas.

There were 52,307 households in the county, of which 31.2% had children under the age of 18 living in them. Of all households, 50.2% were married-couple households, 17.1% were households with a male householder and no spouse or partner present, and 26.5% were households with a female householder and no spouse or partner present. About 25.9% of all households were made up of individuals and 12.1% had someone living alone who was 65 years of age or older.

There were 58,572 housing units, of which 10.7% were vacant. Among occupied housing units, 66.6% were owner-occupied and 33.4% were renter-occupied. The homeowner vacancy rate was 2.0% and the rental vacancy rate was 7.9%.

=== 2000 census ===
As of the census of 2000, 110,595 people, 42,849 households, and 30,208 families resided in the county. The population density was 118 people per square mile (46 people/km^{2}). The 48,315 housing units averaged 52 units per square mile (20/km^{2}). The racial makeup of the county was 87.20% White, 5.85% Black or African American, 1.31% Native American, 0.57% Asian, 0.05% Pacific Islander, 2.90% from other races, and 2.13% from two or more races; 6.80% of the population were Hispanic or Latino of any race.

== Government and politics ==
=== Government ===
Grayson County is governed by a Commissioners Court, which is composed of a county judge and four commissioners. The county judge is elected by the entire county while the four commissioners are elected from four different precincts.

==== County Judge & Commissioners ====
Office	Name	Party
County Judge	Bruce Dawsey	Republican
Commissioner, Precinct 1	Josh Marr	Republican
Commissioner, Precinct 2	Art Arthur	Republican
Commissioner, Precinct 3	Lindsay Wright	Republican
Commissioner, Precinct 4	Matt Hardenburg	Republican

==== County Officials ====
Office	Name	Party
County Clerk	Deana Patterson	Republican
Criminal District Attorney	John Hill	Republican
District Clerk	Kelly Ashmore	Republican
Sheriff	Tony Bennie	Republican
Tax Assessor-Collector	Bruce Stidham	Republican

==== Justices of the Peace ====
Office	Name	Party
Precinct 1	Ginny Hampton	Republican
Precinct 2	Dennis Michael	Republican
Precinct 3	Damon Vannoy	Republican
Precinct 4	Christina Fox	Republican

=== Politics ===
Grayson County is a stronghold of the Republican Party. A Democratic presidential candidate has not carried the county since 1976.

In 1992, Grayson was one of only four counties in Texas to have a plurality voting for Ross Perot. Four years later Bob Dole began an ongoing streak of Republican victories at the presidential level. Grayson County has given over 60% of its vote to Republican presidential candidates since 2000.

Grayson County is located within District 62 of the Texas House of Representatives. Grayson County is located within District 30 of the Texas Senate.

United States presidential election results for Grayson County, Texas
Year	Republican		Democratic		Third party(ies)	
Year	No.	%	No.	%	No.	%
1912	411	7.86%	3,938	75.31%	880	16.83%
1916	1,024	15.95%	5,092	79.30%	305	4.75%
1920	2,125	26.75%	5,241	65.97%	579	7.29%
1924	1,973	19.09%	7,413	71.73%	949	9.18%
1928	6,277	57.63%	4,600	42.23%	15	0.14%
1932	1,317	11.98%	9,631	87.62%	44	0.40%
1936	947	8.17%	10,627	91.64%	23	0.20%
1940	1,340	9.65%	12,530	90.25%	14	0.10%
1944	1,372	9.75%	11,636	82.70%	1,062	7.55%
1948	2,174	15.37%	10,991	77.69%	983	6.95%
1952	7,736	42.52%	10,435	57.35%	23	0.13%
1956	7,402	45.33%	8,876	54.35%	52	0.32%
1960	7,312	42.44%	9,866	57.26%	53	0.31%
1964	5,500	27.88%	14,207	72.01%	21	0.11%
1968	8,007	34.81%	10,379	45.12%	4,615	20.06%
1972	16,769	70.65%	6,952	29.29%	13	0.05%
1976	11,981	41.18%	17,015	58.48%	99	0.34%
1980	16,811	53.66%	13,807	44.08%	708	2.26%
1984	22,554	65.47%	11,803	34.26%	93	0.27%
1988	18,825	56.55%	14,347	43.10%	115	0.35%
1992	12,322	32.15%	12,547	32.73%	13,463	35.12%
1996	17,169	48.48%	14,338	40.49%	3,904	11.02%
2000	25,596	64.09%	13,647	34.17%	697	1.75%
2004	30,777	69.28%	13,452	30.28%	194	0.44%
2008	31,136	68.33%	13,900	30.51%	528	1.16%
2012	30,936	73.20%	10,670	25.25%	658	1.56%
2016	35,325	74.50%	10,301	21.72%	1,790	3.78%
2020	44,163	74.13%	14,506	24.35%	907	1.52%
2024	50,556	76.70%	14,800	22.45%	559	0.85%

United States Senate election results for Grayson County, Texas1
Year	Republican		Democratic		Third party(ies)	
Year	No.	%	No.	%	No.	%
2024	48,504	74.31%	15,453	23.67%	1,319	2.02%

United States Senate election results for Grayson County, Texas2
Year	Republican		Democratic		Third party(ies)	
Year	No.	%	No.	%	No.	%
2020	43,735	74.16%	13,938	23.63%	1,301	2.21%

Texas Gubernatorial election results for Grayson County
Year	Republican		Democratic		Third party(ies)	
Year	No.	%	No.	%	No.	%
2022	34,903	77.75%	9,563	21.30%	425	0.95%

== See also ==
- List of museums in North Texas
- National Register of Historic Places listings in Grayson County, Texas
- Recorded Texas Historic Landmarks in Grayson County
