= Richland High School (Prosper, Texas) =

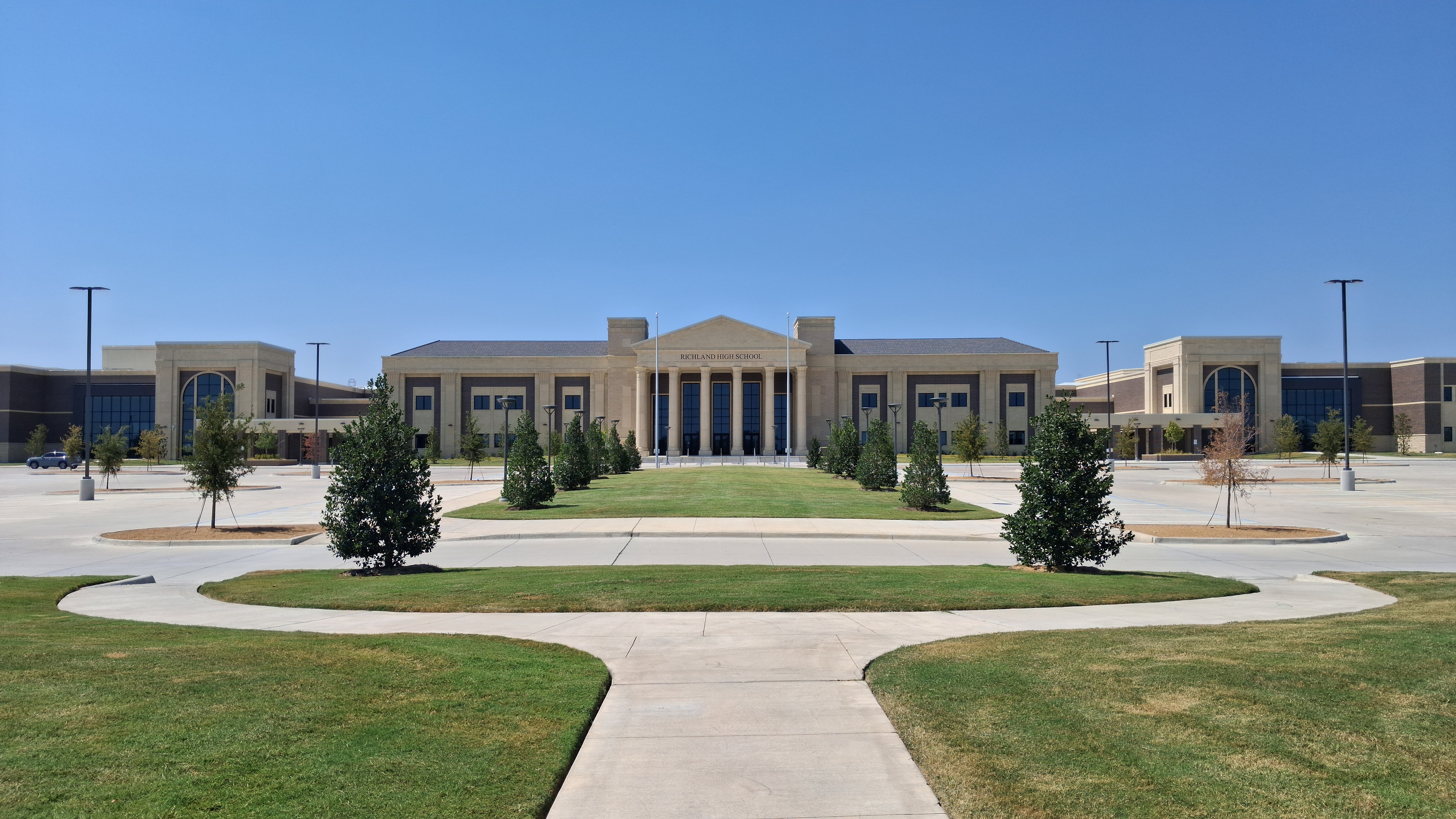

Location
- 3450 Prairie Dr; Prosper, Texas 75078; United States; 33.22641°N 96.85824°W

Information
- Type: Co-educational, public, secondary
- School district: Prosper Independent School District
- NCES School ID: 483600022953
- Grades: 9–12
- Enrollment: 1,794 (October 2025)
- Colors: Purple, black, and white
- Athletics conference: UIL Class 5A
- Mascot: Raiders
- Website: www.prosper-isd.net/o/rhs

Richland High School is a public high school in Prosper, Texas, United States. It is the fourth comprehensive high school established in Prosper ISD, after Prosper High School, Rock Hill High School, and Walnut Grove High School.

== History ==
Richland High School broke ground in August 2023. The campus opened for the 2025-2026 school year with grades 9-12, relieving overcrowding at Prosper High. Prosper ISD initially estimated an inaugural enrollment of around 1250 students, but the district submitted an October 2025 enrollment of 1794 to the Texas Education Agency.

== Athletics ==
Richland's athletic teams are known as the Raiders. The school colors are purple, black, and gray.

For the 2026-2027 and 2027-2028 school years, Richland is a part of 5A Division 2 Region 1 District 4. Other schools in this district are Anna, Celina, Denison, Frisco, Frisco Emerson, Frisco Independence, Frisco Memorial, and Frisco Panther Creek.

In other sports, Richland is a part of 5A Region 1 District 6, along with Denton, Denton Ryan, Frisco Lone Star, Frisco Panther Creek, Frisco Reedy, and The Colony.
