= Branch, Texas =

- Unincorporated community
- Location within Texas Location within the United States
- Coordinates: 33°06′09″N 96°30′58″W
- Country: United States
- State: Texas
- County: Collin
- Elevation: 522 ft (159 m)
- Time zone: UTC-6 (Central (CST))
  - Summer (DST): UTC-5 (CDT)
- GNIS feature ID: 2034632

Branch is an unincorporated community in Collin County, located in the U.S. state of Texas. According to the Handbook of Texas, the community had a population of 447 in 2000. It is located within the Dallas-Fort Worth Metroplex.

== History ==
The area in what is known as Branch today was named for local storeowner J.T. Branch. A post office was established at Branch in 1901, but closed two years later, transferring mail delivery to nearby Clear Lake. Its population was 25 in 1960, then jumped to 447 from 1980 through 2000.

On June 30, 2011, a Collin County District Court Judge issued a judgment ending a legal dispute over Princeton's southern boundary. The judgment ruled against the city, finding that the tract of land in question had not been annexed and was not lawfully within the city limits.

== Geography ==
Branch is located on the shores of Lavon Lake and is on Farm to Market Road 982, 11 mi (18 km) southeast of McKinney in southern Collin County.

== Education ==
Today the community is served by the Princeton Independent School District. It is zoned for James Elementary School, Mattei Middle School, Lovelady High School and Princeton High School.
