= Clear Lake, Texas =

- Populated place
- Location within the state of Texas Clear Lake, Texas (the United States)
- Coordinates: 33°4′41″N 96°29′42″W
- Country: United States
- State: Texas
- Counties: Collin
- Town of Clear Lake: c. 1890
- Elevation: 530.0 ft (161.54 m)

Population (1990)
  - Total: est 50
- Time zone: UTC-6 (Central (CST))
  - Summer (DST): UTC-5 (CDT)
- ZIP code: 75407
- Area codes: 214, 469, 972
- FIPS code: 48-15304
- GNIS feature ID: 1378127

Clear Lake is a populated place located in Collin County, Texas, United States. According to the Handbook of Texas, the community had a population of 50 in 1990. It is located within the Dallas-Fort Worth Metroplex.

== History ==
A distillery was constructed and run by the US government in 1884 on the shores of adjacent Clear Lake. A few people were drawn to the area by the government project, and by 1890 the town of Clear Lake had been founded. Robert L. Palmer served as the postmaster when the office was established there in 1898, and it closed sometime around 1930. The town was Dallas's main source of bois d'arc timber for a number of years during the city's early years, when Dallas tried paving its streets with the wood. Clear Lake's population shrank significantly after Dallas shelved the project. Despite being in the center of the Blackland Prairie, seasonal flooding in the area around Clear Lake devastated crops. By 1914, Clear Lake had a population of 100, up from an estimated 75 in 1910. Despite the 1954 creation of Lavon Lake, the estimated population of the village went down to fifty from the 1930s to 1990.

== Geography ==
Clear Lake is located near the south shore of Lavon Lake, 12 mi (19 km) southeast of McKinney in southeastern Collin County. It was also on the Atchison, Topeka and Santa Fe Railroad.

== Education ==
Today the community is served by the Princeton Independent School District. It is zoned for Harper Elementary School, Clark Middle School, and Princeton High School.
