= Bryant Elementary School =

Bryant Elementary School is the name of a number of elementary schools, including:

- Bryant Elementary School (Dubuque, Iowa)
- Bryant Elementary School (Long Beach, California)
- Bryant Elementary School (Independence, Missouri)
- Bryant Elementary School (Philadelphia, Pennsylvania)
- Bryant Elementary School (Tacoma, Washington)
- Bryant Elementary School (Seattle, Washington)
- Bryant Elementary School K-6 (Arlington, Texas)
- Bryant Elementary School K-6 (Moore, Oklahoma)
- Bryant Elementary School K-5 (Sioux City, Iowa)
- Bryant Elementary School (Ann Arbor, Michigan)
- Bryant Elementary School K-6 (Wichita, Kansas)
- Bryant Elementary School (Prosper, Texas)
