= Davis Webb =

American football player and coach (born 1995)

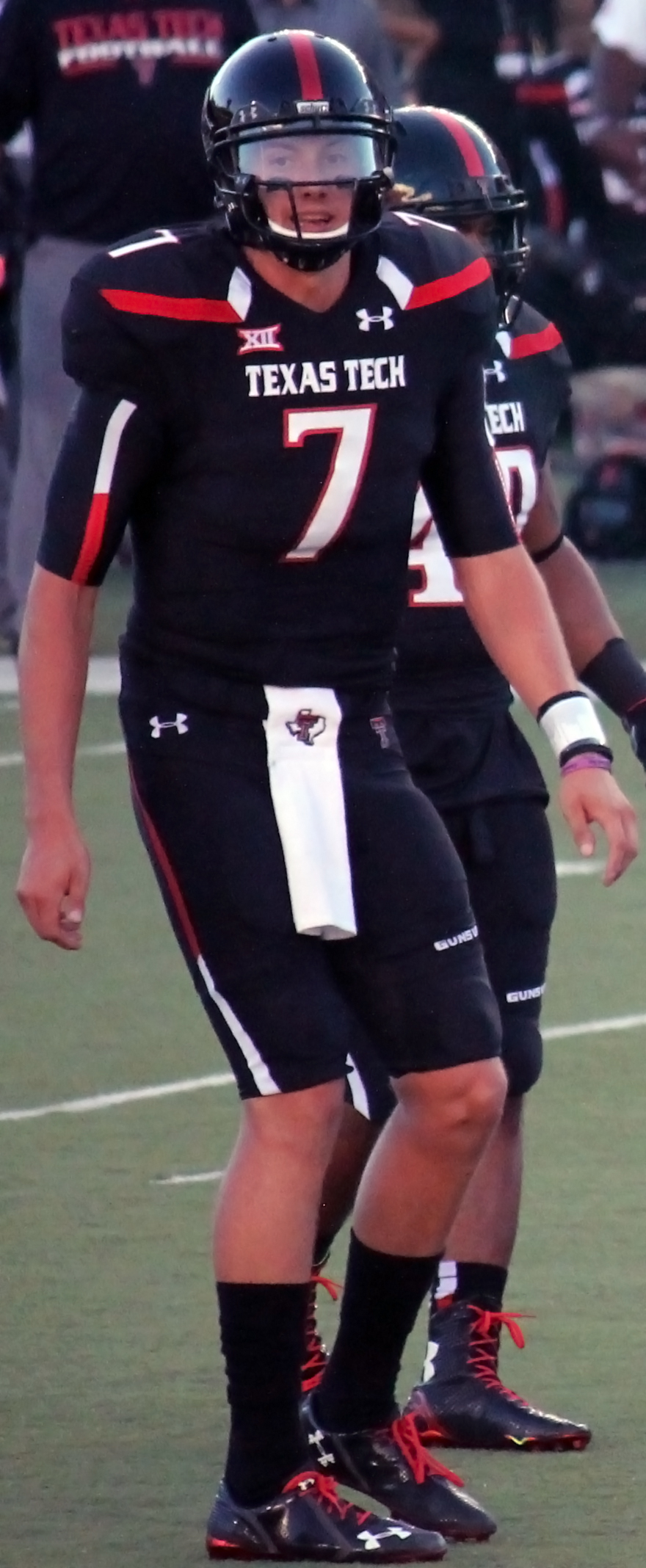
- Webb with the Texas Tech Red Raiders in 2014

Denver Broncos
- Title: Offensive coordinator

Personal information
- Born: January 22, 1995 (age 31); Prosper, Texas, U.S.
- Listed height: 6 ft 5 in (1.96 m)
- Listed weight: 225 lb (102 kg)

Career information
- Position: Quarterback (No. 7, 12, 5)
- High school: Prosper
- College: Texas Tech (2013–2015); California (2016)
- NFL draft: 2017: 3rd round, 87th overall pick

Career history

Playing
- New York Giants (2017); New York Jets (2018); Buffalo Bills (2019–2021); New York Giants (2022)

Coaching
- Denver Broncos (2023–present); Quarterbacks coach (2023–2024); Offensive pass game coordinator & quarterbacks coach (2025); Offensive coordinator (2026–present)

Career NFL statistics
- Passing attempts: 40
- Passing completions: 23
- Passing yards: 168
- Completion percentage: 57.5%
- TD–INT: 1–0
- Passer rating: 75.8
- Rushing yards: 38
- Rushing touchdowns: 1
- Stats at Pro Football Reference
- Coaching profile at Pro Football Reference

Davis Matthew Webb (born January 22, 1995) is an American professional football coach and former quarterback who is the offensive coordinator for the Denver Broncos of the National Football League (NFL). He played his first three seasons of college football for the Texas Tech Red Raiders and then the California Golden Bears, before being selected by the New York Giants in the third round of the 2017 NFL draft. In his time in the NFL, he was a member of all three franchises representing cities in New York, spending the most time with the Buffalo Bills. However, he never played a single football game as a Jet.

== Early life ==
Webb attended Keller High School before transferring to Prosper High School in Prosper, Texas. While at Prosper High School, Webb guided the team to a district championship and a trip to the Texas 4A regional semifinals.

Webb earned several accolades and was named first-team All-District as a junior and honorable mention All-State. Webb graduated from Prosper after passing for 2,658 yards, 589 yards rushing, and 36 touchdowns.

== College career ==
=== Texas Tech ===
==== 2013 ====
Webb was ranked a 4-star prospect coming out of high school by ESPN and signed with Texas Tech University to play for the Red Raiders. Webb alternated as a backup quarterback behind fellow freshman Baker Mayfield, and as a starter, during his freshman year in 2013. Webb became only the second true freshman at the position to play for the school. Webb had been afflicted by an undetermined illness.

Webb made his first game appearance in the contest against TCU, where he threw the game-winning touchdown to wide receiver Bradley Marquez. Following an injury to Mayfield, Webb made his first career start in an appearance against Iowa State, which saw him pass for 415 yards and 3 touchdowns. His performance marked the fourth most yards passing for first time starter in school history.

He followed up his Iowa State performance with a record-setting performance against West Virginia. Webb passed for 462 yards, 36–50 attempts, and two touchdowns, making Webb the first quarterback in school history to pass for over 400 yards twice in his freshman season. Additionally, the yardage broke the school freshman passing record previously held by Billy Joe Tolliver. The passing yardage also set a Big 12 Conference freshman passing record, beating the mark set by Baylor's Nick Florence in 2009.

The game against Oklahoma State saw Webb complete 45 passes on 71 attempts for 425 yards. The number of completions and attempts ranked fourth overall, and second overall behind Texas Tech quarterback Graham Harrell.

Webb struggled in an outing against Kansas State, and did not play in the second half. However, his 78 yards thrown pushed him over the previous record for the school single season freshman passing yards previously held by Zebbie Lethridge in 1994. After Webb's poor performance against Kansas State, Mayfield returned to the starting role for the next two games against Baylor and Texas.

It was announced during the preparations for the 2013 Holiday Bowl, that Mayfield was going to be transferring from the school following a "miscommunication" and the open competition for the starting position. The departure of Mayfield ensured that the only competition for the starting job for the Holiday Bowl was going to be Michael Brewer.

Webb was named the starter for the Holiday Bowl against a top 15 Arizona State team, after the month of bowl practice. Webb provided one of the most impressive performances of the 2013–14 NCAA football bowl season. He finished the game with 403 yards, 28–41 passing and four touchdowns in the 37–23 upset, tying a Holiday Bowl touchdown record and earning MVP honors.

Webb concluded his freshman season with several Big 12 Conference freshman records: single game total offense, single game offensive plays, most 400 yard passing performances, passing yards in a single game, passing attempts in a single game, passes completed in a single game. His performance also marked school freshman records for completions, attempts, touchdowns, passing yards, and 400 yard games. Webb was named honorable mention Freshman All-American by College Football News, Big 12 Broadcasters Conference Freshman of the Year, and he received several weekly honors.

==== 2014 ====
Webb was named the starting quarterback at the start of the 2014 season, following the transfer of fellow quarterback Michael Brewer to Virginia Tech. Both Webb and the team as a whole were named dark horse candidates for the Heisman Trophy and the national championship respectively by ESPN. Webb was named to the Maxwell Award and Manning Award watchlists for the best quarterback in college football. Webb started the first eight games of the season before suffering a season-ending ankle injury in a game against TCU on October 25, 2014. He was replaced by true freshman Patrick Mahomes. It was revealed later that Webb was going to undergo surgery on his shoulder, which he injured originally on September 25 in a game against Oklahoma State.

==== 2015 ====
Webb was the backup quarterback in 2015, to Patrick Mahomes, who retained possession of the starting quarterback job. On December 30, 2015, Webb announced his intention to transfer from Texas Tech.

=== California ===
Webb announced his intention to transfer to the University of Colorado Boulder, on January 27, 2016. Webb still was enrolled at Texas Tech and, he was nine credit hours short of finishing his degree requirements, at the time of the announcement. Webb planned to be in Colorado for the first summer session, after finishing his degree requirements and graduating from Texas Tech. Webb revealed in late May that he was going to be transferring to the University of California, Berkeley, instead of Colorado. California Golden Bears head coach Sonny Dykes announced on May 25, 2016, that Webb had signed a financial aid agreement and that he was enrolled officially. He was eligible to play immediately as a graduate transfer.

Webb completed 382 of 620 passes (62%) for 4295 yards, 37 touchdowns and 12 interceptions for a 135.63 QBR, in one season at California. He set school single-season records for passing attempts, completions and total plays while tying three other school records, including total touchdowns [43 (37 passing, 6 rushing)], and 300-yard passing games (10). He was named the Golden Bears' Season MVP and won the Reese's Senior Bowl MVP award in 2016. Webb was also nominated to the College Football All-America Team, and was a semi-finalist for both the Davey O'Brien National Quarterback Award and the Earl Campbell Tyler Rose Award, as well as an honorable mention All-Pac-12 Conference choice of the league's coaches and the Pac-12 Newcomer of the Year. Webb was also in the final 15 for the Johnny Unitas Golden Arm Award.

== Professional career ==
Pre-draft measurables
Height	Weight	Arm length	Hand span	Wingspan	40-yard dash	10-yard split	20-yard split	20-yard shuttle	Three-cone drill	Vertical jump	Broad jump	Wonderlic
6 ft 4 5/8 in (1.95 m)	229 lb (104 kg)	33 1/8 in (0.84 m)	9 in (0.23 m)	6 ft 6 1/8 in (1.98 m)	4.79 s	1.57 s	2.80 s	4.21 s	6.92 s	33.0 in (0.84 m)	9 ft 10 in (3.00 m)	25
All values from NFL Combine

=== New York Giants (first stint) ===
The New York Giants selected Webb in the third round (87th overall) of the 2017 NFL draft. He was the fifth quarterback selected in 2017. On May 11, 2017, the Giants signed Webb to a four-year, $3.53 million contract that included a signing bonus of $766,420.

On November 28, 2017, head coach Ben McAdoo announced that Geno Smith would replace Eli Manning as the starting quarterback and that Webb would also see playing time before the end of the season. McAdoo was later fired, along with Jerry Reese, the general manager who drafted Webb. Interim head coach Steve Spagnuolo admitted that it was likely Manning would remain the starter for the rest of season.

During the 2017 season, Webb drew praise from teammates Landon Collins and Dominique Rodgers-Cromartie. Rodgers-Cromartie remarked that Webb looked like a "Young Eli", while Collins said that the future front office should not draft a quarterback in the next draft, assuring them that "Davis is gonna be really good in the league when it’s his time". Three other teammates, Travis Rudolph, Kalif Raymond and Marquis Bundy, also had positive comments about Webb, with Rudolph saying Webb has the highly sought-after 'it' factor. Manning nicknamed him the "Dragon".

During Week 16 of the 2017 season, it was revealed that Spagnuolo had Webb take snaps with the first-team in practice that week, for the first time that season. Despite this, Webb was inactive for the Week 16 game against the Arizona Cardinals. He was promoted to second-string for the final game of the season.

On September 2, 2018, Webb was waived by the Giants.

=== New York Jets ===
On September 4, 2018, Webb was signed to the practice squad of the New York Jets. He was promoted to the active roster on November 10, 2018, to serve as the backup to Josh McCown following an injury to rookie starter Sam Darnold. Webb was released as part of final roster cuts on August 31, 2019, having not seen any action in his year with the team.

=== Buffalo Bills ===
Webb was signed to the Buffalo Bills' practice squad on September 2, 2019. He signed a reserve/future contract with the Bills on January 6, 2020.

Webb was waived by the Bills on September 5, 2020, and signed to the practice squad the next day. He was elevated to the active roster on December 28 for the team's Week 16 game against the New England Patriots, then reverted to the practice squad after the game. On January 26, 2021, Webb signed a reserves/futures contract with the Bills.

On August 31, 2021, Webb was again waived by the Bills, and re-signed to the practice squad a day later. On November 14, 2021, more than two years after first signing with the Bills, Webb made his NFL debut, against the Jets during garbage time. His contract expired when the team's season ended on January 23, 2022.

=== New York Giants (second stint) ===
On February 7, 2022, the Giants signed Webb to a reserve/futures contract. He was waived on August 30, 2022, and signed to the practice squad the next day. On October 8, 2022, Webb was elevated from the practice squad for the Week 5 game against the Green Bay Packers. With the Giants choosing to rest starter Daniel Jones for the playoffs, Webb was promoted to the active roster for the team's Week 18 game against the Philadelphia Eagles. This was Webb's first career NFL start, over five years after he was drafted. In his first and only career start, he completed 23 of 40 attempts for 168 yards, throwing one touchdown and rushing for another, the only touchdowns of his playing career. The Giants lost the game 22–16. Webb's practice squad contract with the team expired after the season ended on January 21, 2023.

== Career statistics ==
=== NFL ===
Year	Team	Games			Passing								Rushing				Sacks		Fumbles	
Year	Team	GP	GS	Record	Cmp	Att	Pct	Yds	Y/A	TD	Int	Rtg	Att	Yds	Avg	TD	Sck	SckY	Fum	Lost
2021	BUF	1	0	—	0	0	0.0	0	0.0	0	0	0.0	2	−3	−1.5	0	0	0	0	0
2022	NYG	1	1	0–1	23	40	57.5	243	4.2	1	0	75.8	6	41	6.8	1	0	0	0	0
Career		2	1	0–1	23	40	57.5	168	4.2	1	0	75.8	8	38	4.8	1	0	0	0	0

=== College ===
Season	Team	Games			Passing								Rushing			
Season	Team	GP	GS	Record	Cmp	Att	Pct	Yds	Y/A	TD	Int	Rtg	Att	Yds	Avg	TD
2013	Texas Tech	10	6	3–3	226	361	62.6	2,718	7.5	20	9	139.1	25	–12	–0.5	0
2014	Texas Tech	8	8	3–5	211	345	61.2	2,539	7.4	24	13	138.4	17	16	0.9	1
2015	Texas Tech	5	0	—	22	41	53.7	300	7.3	2	0	131.2	2	6	3.0	2
2016	California	12	12	5–7	382	620	61.6	4,295	6.9	37	12	135.6	33	–110	–3.3	6
Career		35	26	11–15	841	1,367	61.5	9,852	7.2	83	34	137.1	77	–100	–1.3	9

== Coaching career ==
On February 23, 2023, Webb was hired by the Denver Broncos as their quarterbacks coach under head coach Sean Payton. Webb had expressed interest in transitioning to coaching duties, having been previously asked by the Bills to be their quarterbacks coach.

Prior to the 2025 season, Webb was promoted to the position of offensive pass game coordinator following the departure of John Morton. He retained his position as the quarterbacks coach, holding both roles simultaneously.

On February 2, 2026, Webb was promoted to offensive coordinator after the firing of Joe Lombardi. On February 24, Payton announced at the NFL Combine that Webb would be calling plays for the offense during the upcoming season, marking the first time Payton had delegated this duty during his career as a head coach. On October 8th, following a 14–24 loss against the San Francisco 49ers in Week 4, it was announced that Sean Payton would be taking over all playcalling duties.
