= Student Press Law Center =

American non-profit organization promoting student press freedom

- Abbreviation: SPLC
- Formation: 1974
- Type: 501(c)(3) Non-Profit
- Tax ID no.: 52-1184647
- Purpose: Advocate for student journalists and open government on campus
- Headquarters: Washington, D.C., U.S.
- Region served: United States
- Executive Director: Gary Green
- Website: splc.org

The Student Press Law Center (SPLC) is a non-profit organization that aims to promote, support and defend press freedom rights for student journalists at high schools and colleges in the United States. It is dedicated to student free-press rights and provides information, advice and legal assistance at no charge for students and educators.

SPLC was founded in 1974. The Kennedy Memorial Foundation and the Reporters Committee for Freedom of the Press created the center at the recommendation of the Commission of Inquiry into High School Journalism in Captive Voices, a book that found that censorship of student media in the United States was pervasive and identified the need for an organization that would stand up for students’ First Amendment rights. The center became a separate corporation in 1979. It is the only legal assistance agency in the United States with the primary mission of educating high school and college journalists about the rights and responsibilities embodied in the First Amendment and supporting the freedom of expression of student news media to address issues and express themselves free from censorship.

SPLC is a non-partisan 501(c)(3) corporation. It is headquartered in the University of California Building in Washington, D.C. It was previously headquartered in Arlington, Virginia, where it shared a suite of offices with the Reporters Committee for Freedom of the Press. In 2024 the organization celebrated its 50th birthday at the headquarters of the New York Times.

== Services ==
The Student Press Law Center:

- Provides free legal help and information to student journalists and educators through a legal hotline, as well as educational materials on a wide variety of media law topics, including laws regarding defamation, freedom of information, copyrights, invasion of privacy, reporter's privilege, obscenity, censorship, and the First Amendment.
- Roughly 200 censorship cases are reported to the Center each year.
- Trains student journalists and educators on First Amendment and media law topics through its virtual SPLC in the Classroom program, as well as at conferences and events throughout the country. SPLC helps students negotiate with their schools for press freedoms.
- Builds and supports state-based grassroots coalitions of press freedom advocates that seek to protect student press freedom with state laws.
- Files amici curiae in cases where student media rights could be effected.
- Operates an Attorney Referral Network of approximately 250 volunteer media law attorneys across the country who may be available to provide free legal representation to local students when necessary.
- Maintains a free Freedom of Information Law Letter Generator that creates a public records request tailored to the law of each of the 50 states and the District of Columbia, for use by student journalists and others seeking access to public records.
- Presents annual awards to recognize student journalists and educators that have shown courage in standing up for student press freedom.
- Convenes a national "Student Press Freedom Day" each February to bring national focus on the issues of student journalism and censorship.

== Advocacy ==
SPLC has advocated for the passage of "New Voices" legislation at the state level to protect student journalists' rights. Its efforts led to proposed legislation in ten states: in Hawaii, Kentucky, Missouri, Nebraska, New Jersey, New York, Iowa, Tennessee, West Virginia, and Texas. Thanks to the grassroots movement behind New Voices — spearheaded nationally by SPLC — West Virginia became the 17th state with such legislation in 2023.

In 2015, SPLC aided Prosper High School student journalists who were censored and removed from their student newspaper after reporting on a teacher criticizing their colleague for reporting a school-related incident of inappropriate sexual conduct to police.

In 2018, the center supported two student reporters whose high school administration shut down their student newspaper when their investigating revealed a teacher was fired for exchanging inappropriate text messages with an underage student.

In 2021, attorneys from the Student Press Law Center, alongside other free-speech groups, submitted an amicus curiae in the supreme court case Mahanoy Area School District v. B.L., which stated the court had unconstitutionally established students as second-class citizens as a consequence of school enrollment.

== Newspaper theft ==
The organization tracks the theft of free newspapers on college campuses. The group considers the disappearance of the student newspapers as censorship by theft.

== Governance and staff ==
SPLC is run by an executive director and a board of directors composed primarily of attorneys, professional journalists and journalism educators. The current executive director, Gary Green, began in the role in April 2023. The previous executive director, Hadar Harris, served from September 2017 to February 2023. Frank LoMonte served as executive director from January 2008 until September 2017. He was preceded by Mark Goodman, who served from 1985 to 2007.

== Funding ==
SPLC is supported by contributions from student journalists, journalism educators, and other individuals, as well as by donations from foundations and corporations. On January 23, 2007, SPLC successfully completed a three-year $3.75 million endowment campaign, spurred by a challenge grant from the John S. and James L. Knight Foundation. In 2017, the organization's total revenue was $763,920, as shown on IRS Form 990.

== See also ==
- Associated Collegiate Press
- Columbia Scholastic Press Association
- Journalism Education Association
- National Scholastic Press Association
