= Rock Hill High School (Texas) =

Public high school in Frisco, Texas, US

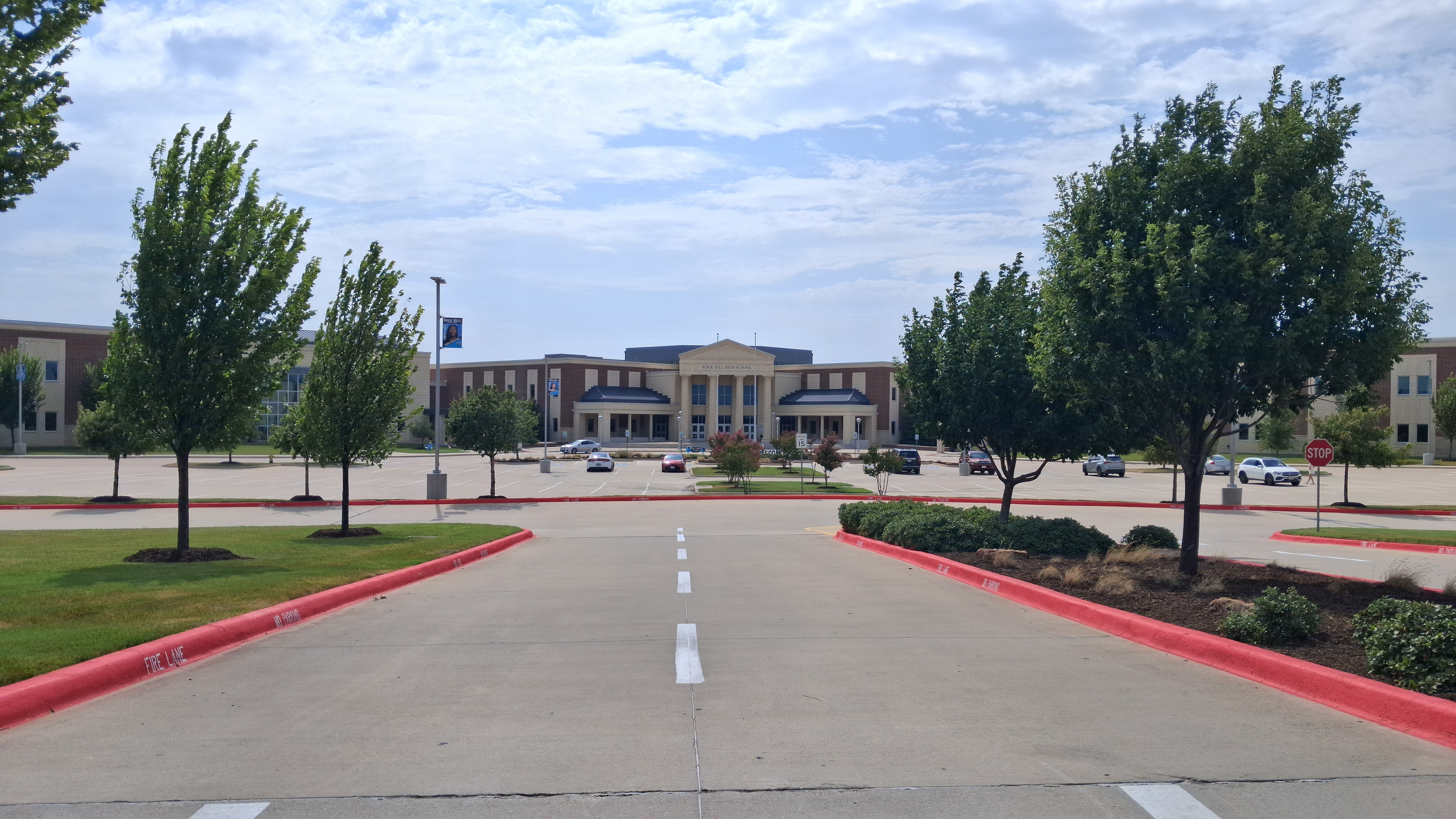

Location
- 16061 North Coit Road; Frisco, Texas 75035-9367; United States; 33°12′34″N 96°46′10″W

Information
- Former names: Rock Hill School (1850–1937); Rock Hill Rural School (1937–1948); Rock Hill Colored (1948–1963)
- Motto: ICSEEU (Integrity, Creativity, Service, Excellence, Empathy, and Unity)
- Founded: c. 1850 (as Rock Hill School); August 19, 2020 (as Rock Hill High School)
- School district: Prosper Independent School District
- NCES School ID: 483600013796
- Principal: Terry Mouton
- Teaching staff: 172.98 (FTE)
- Grades: 9–12
- Enrollment: 2,373 (2023-2024)
- Student to teacher ratio: 13.72
- Colors: Electric blue and Black
- Fight song: The Victors
- Athletics conference: UIL Class 6A
- Mascot: Blue Hawk
- Rival: Prosper High School (crosstown); Liberty High School (Battle of the Birds)
- Website: www.prosper-isd.net/o/rhhs

Rock Hill High School (RHHS) is a public high school in Frisco, Texas. Although located within Prosper ISD, it only serves students from the municipalities of Frisco and McKinney. Founded in 2020, Rock Hill is the second oldest high school in Prosper ISD, after Prosper High School. It draws its students from Bill Hays Middle School and Daniel L. Jones Middle School.

The school is named after the former settlement of Rock Hill, a farming community that once existed near where the school stands today but declined into a ghost town following the arrival of the St. Louis–San Francisco Railway.

The school is regarded as the modern successor to the Rock Hill School, established in the settlement around 1850. Although the original Rock Hill School underwent multiple reconstructions, relocations, and periods of segregation before its closure in 1963, its name and legacy were preserved in the naming of the current Rock Hill High School.

== History ==
=== The Settlement of Rock Hill (1854) ===
Today, "Rock Hill" no longer exists as a distinct administrative or cultural entity, having been fully annexed into the surrounding areas of Prosper and Frisco. However, Rock Hill was once a distinct colony that predated both Frisco and Prosper.

The first Rock Hill School was built around 1850, before Rock Hill was officially incorporated as a community. Parts of Peters' Colony near current-day PGA Parkway (then "Rock Hill Road" and later "Rockhill Parkway") officially incorporated as Rock Hill on December 15, 1854, when John L. Moore was appointed its first postmaster. Situated on "The Flats" of the Texas Blackland Prairies, it had some of the region's most fertile soil and even terrain, and attracted numerous cotton farmers.

By 1873, Rock Hill had grown to a population of 115, featuring the aforementioned white school, a Black school, four churches, three doctors, a general store, a gristmill, and cotton gin operated by J. J. Thompson. Meanwhile, present-day Prosper was still untamed, covered with wildflowers, and largely uninhabited until 1880.

=== Migration to Prosper and Decline (1902) ===
In 1902, the Frisco Railway was constructed two miles north of Rock Hill. Seeking the economic opportunity purported in railway towns, most Rock Hill residents relocated their homes and businesses northward. House mover Sam Sproles reportedly transported all but "one church and one store" out of Rock Hill using "six big engines." Rock Hill quickly declined, with the population falling to 30 by the 1900s, and 25 by 1947.

=== Rock Hill School (1850–1948) ===
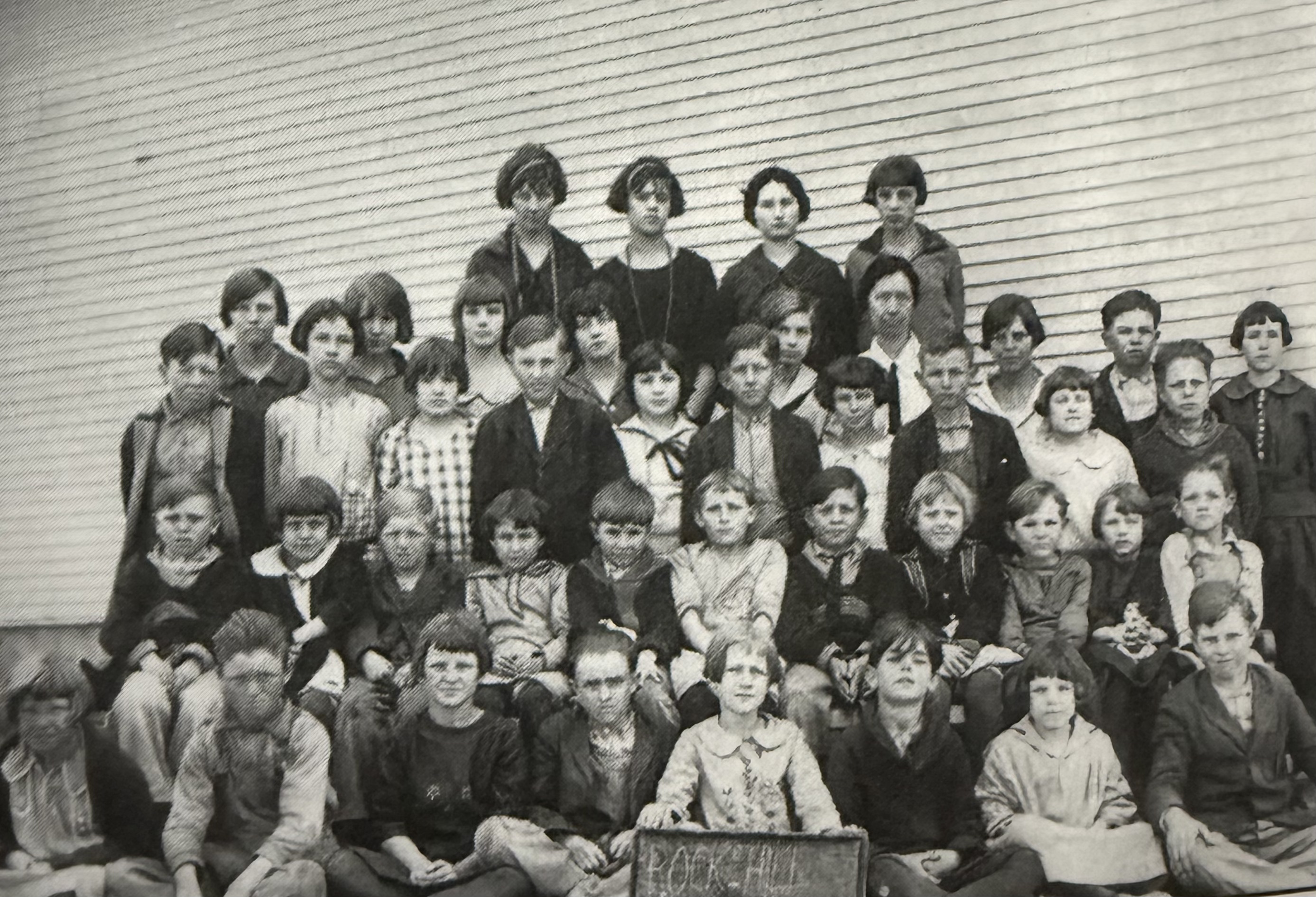
Students grade 1 through 7 of the white Rock Hill School in 1920. A girl in the front row holds a hand-written sign reading "Rock Hill."

By the 20th century, Rock Hill had declined enough such that the Anglo school and the Black school were among the only prominent structures in the entire town. According to Maurine S. Johnson, a newly hired teacher to the white school in 1932, "the schools and the store were the only buildings in the community because all the residents lived out on farms."

The Rock Hill School was a three-story white frame building heated by a coal furnace, with its top floor used by the Independent Order of Odd Fellows (IOOF). It stood slightly south of the modern intersection of State Highway 289 (then Preston Trail) and PGA Parkway (then Rock Hill Road). It was burnt down in 1937 and was replaced by a smaller two-room schoolhouse with an auditorium and a classroom.

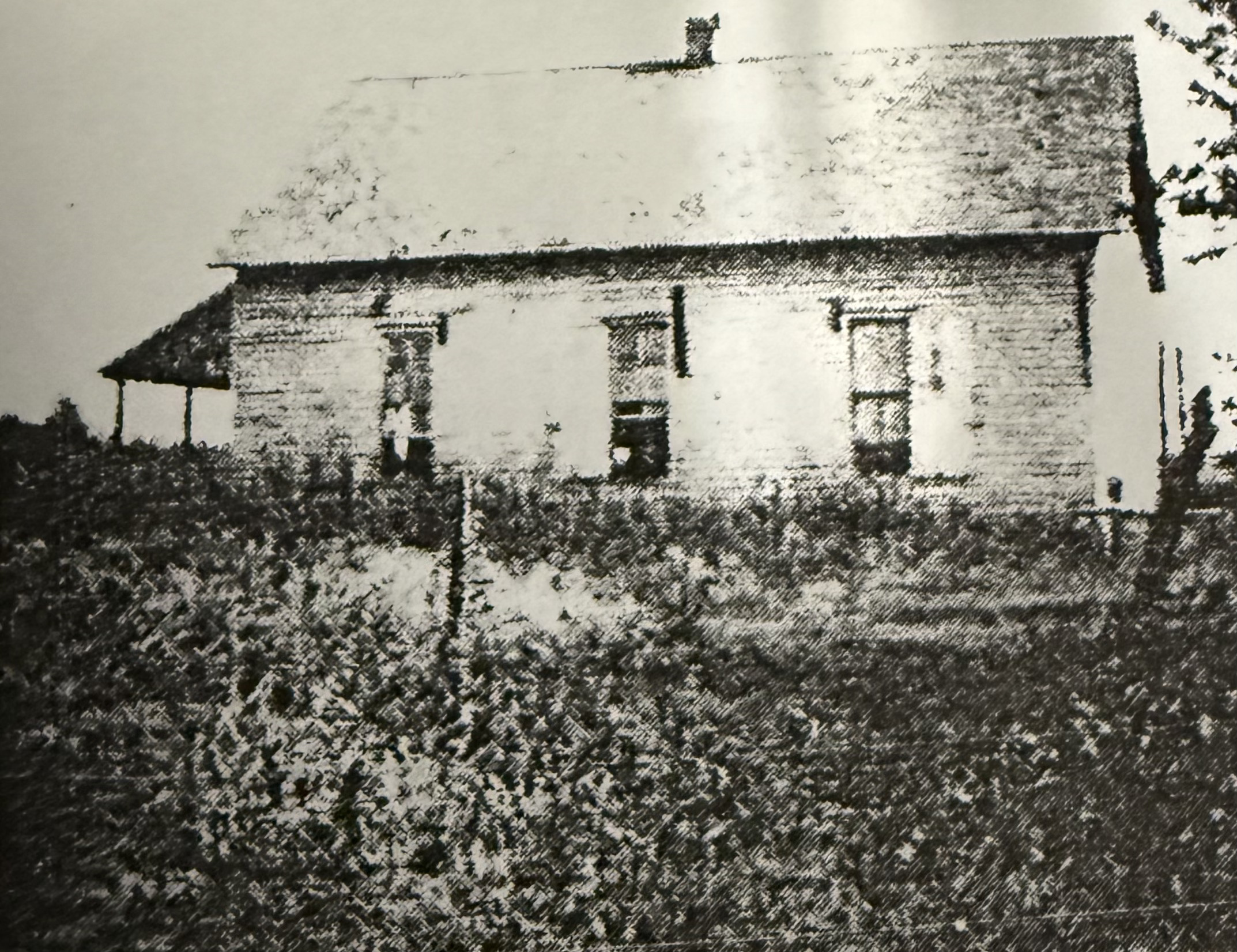
Photograph by Clara Allison of the two-room building used by the Rock Hill Rural School after the three-story building was lost to fire.

The school was officially named "Rock Hill #48" and was renamed "Rock Hill Rural School" after it was rebuilt.

=== Rock Hill Colored School (1850–1963) ===
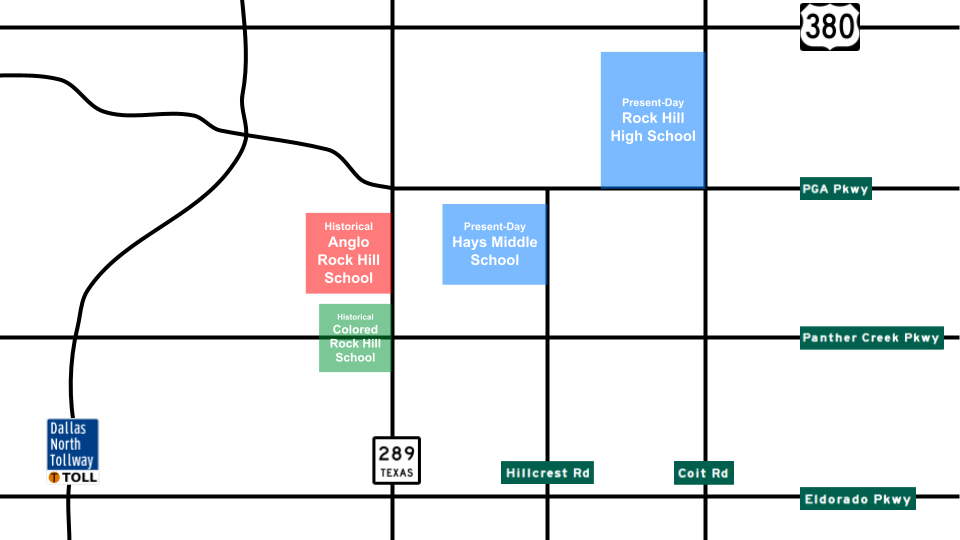
The location of current-day RHHS, Hays Middle School, and the historical Rock Hill School and Rock Hill Colored relative to current-day arterial roads.

A separate Black school, led by principal Bertha Green (known as "Miss Bertha"), was located about a quarter-mile south of the white school. It was officially named "Collin County School #38" and simply referred to as "Rock Hill Colored."

In 1948, the white Rock Hill School consolidated into Prosper ISD. With white students transferring to Prosper High School, the vacated two-room building was repurposed for Black students. In 1963, following Prosper ISD's desegregation, the school was demolished. For several decades, therefore, the only school in the Rock Hill district was the Black school.

=== Ghost Town (1963–1973) ===
After the Black school was razed, the only remaining building in Rock Hill was the aforementioned "store." The Mohons General Store was demolished on December 21, 1973, with the McKinney Examiner declaring that "[t]he Rock Hill community no longer exists, but it will never be forgotten." Rock Hill is now listed as a ghost town in grid 2-F of the Collin County map.

=== Revival (2018–2020) ===
During the 2010s, Prosper experienced a population growth of 349.4%, vastly outpacing the national population growth rate of 7.4% during the same period. Collin County also ranked as the fourth fastest-growing county in the United States, contributing to significant overcrowding at the only high school campus in the district.

To alleviate this concern, Prosper ISD acquired land that had previously been occupied by a detached single-family farmhouse and began construction on a second high school in 2018. The project was set to cost over $200 million, making it the most expensive high school plan in Texas at the time. The campus was named Rock Hill High School in honor of the historic settlement and the former Black school. Rock Hill High School opened for the 2020–2021 academic year during the COVID-19 pandemic, with many students attending virtually.

Rock Hill High School's school zone was drawn from the southern and eastern portions of the original Prosper High School zone. Upperclassmen in the affected areas were given the option to remain at Prosper High School or transfer to Rock Hill High School, while underclassmen were not given such an option and were required to attend Rock Hill.

Rock Hill High School was founded as a UIL Class 5A school but advanced to Class 6A for the 2022–2023 school year, becoming one of the smallest schools in that conference.

=== Split with Walnut Grove High School (2023) ===
In 2023, Prosper ISD opened its third high school, Walnut Grove High School, resulting in a reassignment of students and a significant reduction in enrollment from Rock Hill. Nonetheless, Rock Hill High School remains classified as a 6A school, as UIL reclassifications occur only in even-numbered years.

Rock Hill's first principal, Dustin Toth, relocated to the new Walnut Grove High School to become its first principal. To fill this vacancy, one of Rock Hill's five assistant principals, Terry Mouton, was promoted to principal and continues to serve in that position.

== Academics ==
Rock Hill High School demographics as of 2024-2025
| Race and ethnicity | Total |
|---|---|
| White | 33% |
| Asian | 30% |
| Black | 15% |
| Hispanic | 14% |
| Two or more races | 7% |
| Native American | 1% |
Economic diversity
| Low-income | 13% |
| Affluent | 87% |

As of the 2023–2024 school year, Rock Hill High School is the most ethnically diverse high school in the district, and has the lowest percentage of students identified as being at risk of dropping out of school. Rock Hill offers honors, AP, and dual-credit courses, with grades in these courses weighted differently for the purpose of calculating class rank. Unlike some other high schools in Texas, Rock Hill does not offer International Baccalaureate (IB) courses. Rock Hill High School currently offers all AP courses recognized by the College Board with the exception of African American Studies, Comparative Government and Politics, Microeconomics, German Language and Culture, Italian Language and Culture, and AP Japanese Language and Culture. At Rock Hill, AP Physics 2, AP Physics C: Mechanics, and AP Physics C: Electricity and Magnetism are offered as one condensed single-block course, and is regarded as one of the most demanding courses in the school.

While the school is predominantly White in terms of racial composition, in terms of ethnicity, the largest reported ancestry group in the student body is Asian Indian (14%), followed by German (13.1%) and Mexican (11.6%). Rock Hill maintains strong academic performance, with Advanced Placement (AP) participation of 32.9%, which is above the statewide average of 24.2%. Students also achieve SAT/ACT scores higher than statewide averages.

In addition to typical high school resources, the campus offers simulated hospital rooms, a mock courtroom, a crime scene lab, restaurant-grade culinary facilities, a student-run café (in addition to the commercial café in the cafeteria), a radio studio, and a broadcast news studio for Career and Technical Education (CTE). Some CTE courses, such as auto shop and sports medicine, are offered at other Prosper ISD high schools but not at Rock Hill. Still, Rock Hill students may enroll in these cross-listed courses, with district-provided transportation between high schools during the school day.

== Controversy ==
In February 2021, J. P. Wilson, the head band director of Rock Hill High School, resigned after allegations of sexual misconduct from previous workplaces had surfaced. The district did not publicly disclose a reason for the resignation.

In 2023, the family of a Rock Hill alumna filed a federal civil rights lawsuit against the school, alleging that their daughter was subjected to disability-based discrimination and retaliation. The complaint claimed the district failed to provide proper accommodations for her diagnosed ADHD and learning differences, and that school staff retaliated after her parents raised concerns.

In August 2023, head softball coach Renna Bersosa and assistant coach Kasie Ostrom were arrested for failing to report a sexual assault. A student informed the coaches of sexual misconduct by other students on the team. Despite probable evidence, the coaches dismissed the issue, failing to report within the 48-hour window required under Texas law. Both were charged with failure to report child abuse.

In May 2025, Staff Sergeant Michael Songy, the assistant JROTC instructor at Rock Hill High School, was arrested on a charge of indecent assault with a student. Songy had been previously reported to the Texas Education Agency in July 2024 for sexual misconduct in school, but was granted an emergency recertification in August 2024 to teach in the district's new JROTC program.

Later that month, a senior celebration event attended by students from Rock Hill and Walnut Grove, resulted in several hospitalizations after students consumed THC-laced edibles. At least one Rock Hill student was among those affected. Two students were later arrested and charged with felony drug distribution.

== Athletics ==
As of the 2024–25 school year, Rock Hill High School is a part of 6A Region 1 District 6. Other schools in this district are Allen High School, McKinney High School, McKinney Boyd High School, Plano Senior High School, Plano East Senior High School, Plano West Senior High School, Princeton High School, and Prosper High School.

For the 2026-27 and 2027-28 school years, Rock Hill will be a part of 6A Region 1 District 6, alongside Allen, Dallas Jesuit, McKinney, McKinney Boyd, Princeton, Prosper, and Prosper Walnut Grove.

Rock Hill has official teams in these sports:

- Archery
- Baseball
- Basketball
- Cross Country
- Football
- Golf
- Powerlifting
- Soccer
- Softball
- Swimming and Diving
- Water Polo
- Tennis
- Track & Field
- Volleyball
- Wrestling

== Notable alumni ==
- Matt Wagner (2023), college football tight end for the Boise State Broncos
