= Matt Wagner (American football) =

American football player

No. 88 – Boise State Broncos
- Position: Tight end
- Class: Senior

Personal information
- Listed height: 6 ft 5 in (1.96 m)
- Listed weight: 250 lb (113 kg)

Career information
- High school: Rock Hill (Frisco, Texas)
- College: Boise State (2023–present)
- Stats at ESPN

Matt Wagner is an American college football tight end for the Boise State Broncos.

== Early life ==
Wagner attended Rock Hill High School in Frisco, Texas. As a senior, he had 47 receptions for 592 yards and five touchdowns. He originally committed to play college football at North Texas University before flipping his commitment to Boise State University.

== College career ==
After playing in four games and not recording a reception his first year at Boise State in 2023, Wagner played in 13 with nine starts in 2024 and had 10 receptions for 108 yards. As a sophomore in 2025, he started 10 of 14 games, recording 24 receptions for 251 with a touchdown. Wagner returned to Boise State in 2026 as a starter.
