= Censorship of student media in the United States =

Suppression of mass communication of students

The censorship of student media in the United States is the suppression of student-run news operations' free speech by school administrative bodies, typically state schools. This consists of schools using their authority to control the funding and distribution of publications, taking down articles, and preventing distribution. Some forms of student media censorship extend to expression not funded by or under the official auspices of the school system or college (for example, confiscating independently produced underground publications or imposing discipline for material posted on off-campus websites).

Current legal precedent implies that students are not responsible enough to be trusted with constitutional rights, writes Frank LoMonte, and school faculty are allowed to suppress student speech that is deemed to provoke controversy or disrupt learning. Scholars maintain that this type of censorship violates the constitutional right of free speech that young people are afforded under the First Amendment. Opponents of this legal censorship, such as the Student Press Law Center, a non-profit that tracks and provides pro-bono legal aid to student-run media organizations in the U.S., point to the civic and educational value in student expression that is used to organize reform movements and develop political opinions as reasons to encourage unimpeded student journalism.

== History ==
In 1988, the Supreme Court declared 5-3 in Hazelwood School District v. Kuhlmeier that student newspapers do not have the same freedoms and safeguards as professional media. The case was the result of the school administration of Hazelwood East High School in Missouri forbidding the publication of two newspaper stories regarding abortion and divorce in 1983. Cathy Kuhlmeier, a student reporter, claimed that the move violated her First Amendment rights. The Court decided that student newspapers were never meant to be public forums and as a result, administrators began to regulate high school and college periodicals.

In response to the Supreme Court's decision on the Hazelwood, several states have enacted legislation to counteract the ruling and protect school publications from interference. The Student Press Law Center started worked with student journalists to lobby state legislatures to adopt New Voices, a law intended to fortify student journalists' right to free expression. By 2013, the states of Arkansas, California, Colorado, Illinois, Iowa, Kansas, Massachusetts, and Oregon had all passed the legislation.

Notable cases in the United States include:

- Tinker v. Des Moines Independent Community School District, 1969 – The establishment of the First Amendment rights of students in U.S. public schools. This played a significant role in the Hazelwood School District v. Kuhlmeier case.
- Papish v. Board of Curators of University of Missouri, 1973 – A Supreme Court ruling that the University of Missouri could not discipline a college student for profanity and "indecent" sexual references in an "underground" publication that she funded and distributed.
- Hazelwood School District v. Kuhlmeier, 1988 – A Supreme Court decision that held that public school curricular student newspapers that have not been established as forums for student expression are subject to a lower level of First Amendment protection than independent student expression or newspapers established (by policy or practice) as forums for student expression.
- Rosenberger v. University of Virginia, 1995 – The Supreme Court of the United States assessment on whether a state university retains from the funding of publications by students with regards to the First Amendment.
- Morse v. Frederick, 2007 – A Supreme Court decision in the case of 18-year-old Joseph Frederick, punished for displaying a banner reading "BONG HiTS 4 JESUS" across the street from a school during the 2002 Olympic Torch Relay, concluding that speech promoting illegal drug use during school-sanctioned events is unprotected.

=== First Amendment ===
The First Amendment protects the people to exercise their rights of free speech as well as the freedom of the press in journalistic practice. Since the U.S. Supreme Court’s 1988 decision in Hazelwood v. Kuhlmeier, schools been allowed to censor speech in student media for “legitimate pedagogical concern”. Because pedagogical concern lacked a clear definition, it was interpreted differently by different people. Some states have passed legislation that strengthens the free speech rights of student journalists by clearly defining when and where school administration can censor student media and protecting school employees from retribution for supporting the free speech rights of student journalists.

=== Censored topics ===
Based on interview and survey data, student media topics that are censored include sexual assault, politics, athletics, women’s reproductive rights, and the #MeToo movement. In 2021, the Foundation for Individual Rights in Education found that 60% of student newspapers at four-year public institutions faced some form of censorship.

==== Instances of censorship ====
- Fauquier High School's paper, the Falconer, had a story that covered drugs taken down by their principal in 2015.
- Student journalists for The Telegraph at Herriman High School published a story in January 2018 about a teacher at their school who was fired for allegedly inappropriately texting a female student and school administrators subsequently deleted the story and shut down their website.
- The principal of Prosper High School was accused of censorship in May 2018 when he prevented the publication of editorials by student journalists. 17 different organizations, including the National Coalition Against Censorship, Society of Professional Journalists, and the National Scholastic Press Association came together to write a public letter to the school district urging them to stop the censorship.
- In 2019, Bear Creek High School's student newspaper was met with legal disputes from their school district when they attempted to publish an article covering pornography. The district also threatened to block the story and fire the paper’s longtime faculty adviser, but ultimately allowed its publication after pressure from the attention their actions had generated in nationwide press.
- The Pearl Post, the independent newspaper at Daniel Pearl Magnet High School, reported in 2022 the impact of the COVID-19 vaccine mandate on school staff and noted that after the vaccine mandate was put in place, the school librarian did not show up for school. The former librarian and school administration demanded that any reference to her be removed from the story, but after receiving legal counsel that their reporting of the librarian's name was licit, they chose to keep it in, and the newspaper's advisor was issued a three-day suspension in retaliation.
- In May 2022, Northwest Public Schools in Nebraska shut down the Viking Saga high school student newspaper for reporting two stories on LGBT issues.

==== Impact of censorship ====
Work such as student activism and protests are heavily obstructed by the censorship of school newspapers. Often when student media, news, or other outlets are challenged or removed without cause other than to censor, the student body suffers a lack of cohesion as the sharing of opinions and information is attacked. This delegitimizes democracy by way of removing the belief that the government, or the school in this case, is responsive to their wishes.

== States with laws protecting the free speech of student journalists ==
As of 2022, sixteen states have passed New Voices legislation in order to provide some protection of the First Amendment rights of student journalists.

- Arkansas
- California
- Colorado
- Hawaii
- Illinois
- Iowa
- Kansas
- Maryland
- Massachusetts
- Nevada
- New Jersey
- North Dakota
- Oregon
- Rhode Island
- Vermont
- Washington

== Student Press Freedom Day ==
Student Press Freedom Day is a national day of student journalists and their contributions celebrated annually since 2020. It has been endorsed by the following organizations:

- Student Press Law Center
- Associated Collegiate Press
- College Media Association
- Center for Scholastic Journalism
- First Amendment Coalition
- Freedom Forum Institute
- Journalism Education Association
- National Scholastic Press Association
- PEN America
- Quill & Scroll
- SNO Sites
- Society of Professional Journalists

== See also ==
- 2021–2022 book banning in the United States
- Book censorship in the United States
- Censorship in the United States
- Censorship of school curricula in the United States
- Freedom of speech in schools in the United States
- United States free speech exceptions
