= Frank LoMonte =

American lawyer

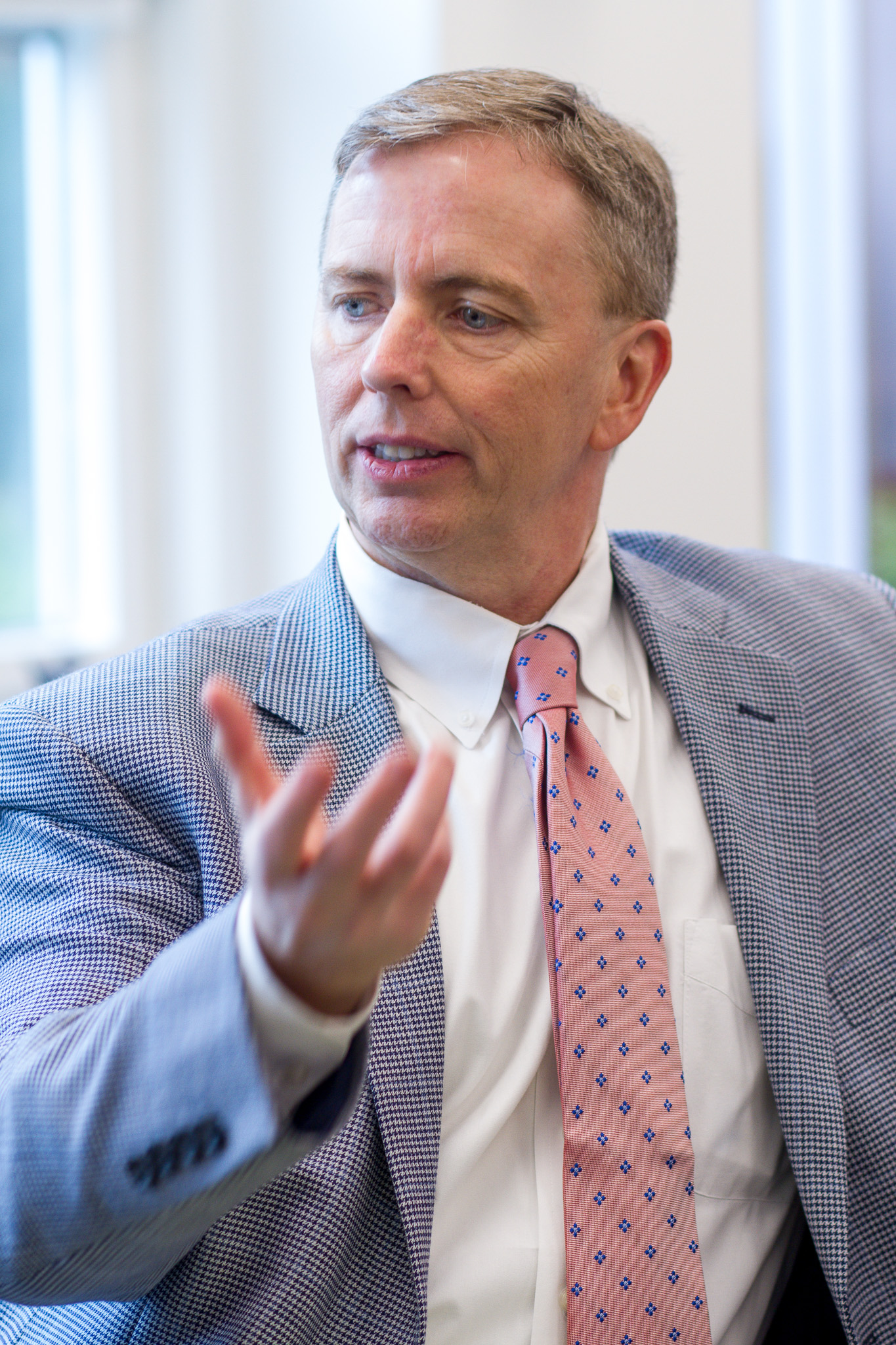
LoMonte in 2016

Frank D. LoMonte is an American lawyer and journalist known for his press freedom advocacy. He is legal counsel at CNN and adjunct professor at the University of Georgia School of Law. He was the director of the Brechner Center for Freedom of Information, part of the University of Florida's College of Journalism and Communications from 2017 to 2022, and was previously the executive director of the Student Press Law Center from 2008 to 2017.

== Early life and education ==
LoMonte attended Georgia State University, graduating in 1994, and received his J.D. from the University of Georgia in 2000.

== Career ==
LoMonte practiced law with Sutherland Asbill & Brennan LLP and clerked for judges in the Northern District of Georgia and the Eleventh Circuit Court of Appeals.

In 2008, LoMonte became the executive director of the Student Press Law Center. During his tenure, he focused on New Voices, a campaign to pass legislation protecting student press freedom, and on Active Voice, a program to empower female student journalists. As of 2020, New Voices legislation has been passed in 14 states, outlawing many instances of prior review and censorship of student media by school administrators, and restoring the more lenient Tinker standard that was overturned in the 1988 Hazelwood v. Kuhlmeier Supreme Court decision.

In August 2017, LoMonte was named the director of the Brechner Center for Freedom of Information, part of the University of Florida's College of Journalism and Communications.

LoMonte joined CNN in February 2022 as legal counsel.

LoMonte is regularly cited in the media as a legal expert on press freedom and freedom of information issues.

== Recognition ==
LoMonte has been recognized for his work on a number of occasions. In 2016, he was placed on the Freedom to Read Foundation's Roll of Honor. In 2017, the College Media Association named a journalism ethics award in his honor. In 2018, he received the National Press Photographers Association's Alicia Calzada First Amendment Award.
