= Walnut Grove High School (Texas) =

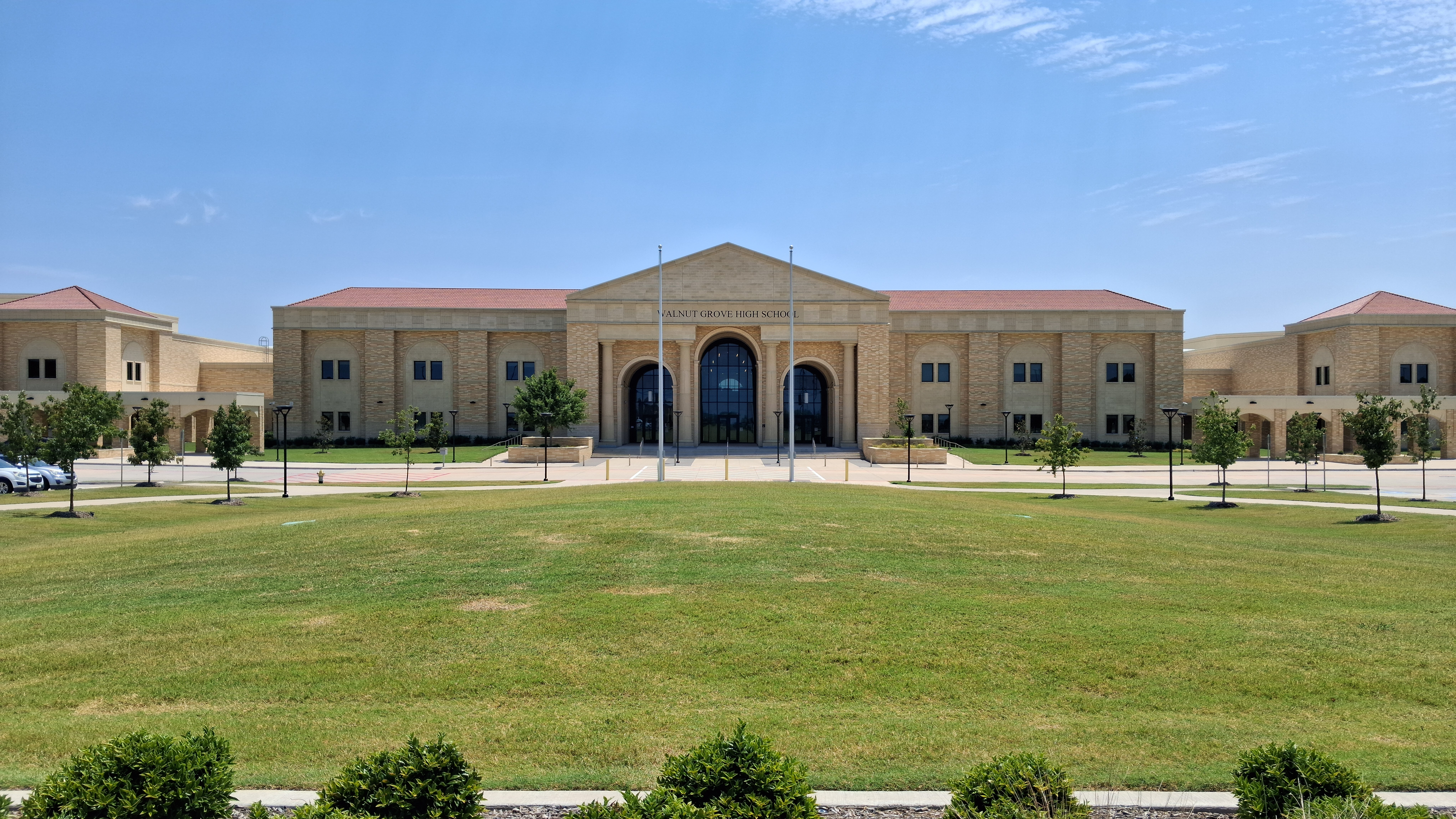

Location
- 3500 E First St; Prosper, Texas 75078; United States; 33.2324°N 96.74803°W

Information
- Type: Co-educational, public, secondary
- School district: Prosper Independent School District
- NCES School ID: 483600013870
- Principal: Dustin Toth
- Teaching staff: 160.78 (FTE)
- Grades: 9–12
- Enrollment: 2,268 (2024-2025)
- Student to teacher ratio: 12.36
- Colors: Navy, silver, and white
- Athletics conference: UIL Class 6A
- Mascot: Wildcat
- Website: www.prosper-isd.net/o/wghs

Grove High School is a public high school in Prosper, Texas, United States. It is the third oldest high school in Prosper ISD, after Prosper High School and Rock Hill High School.

== Athletics ==
Walnut Grove's athletic teams are known as the Wildcats. The school colors are navy blue and silver.

Walnut Grove won the 2025 UIL 5A D1 Boys' Soccer state title. The team beat San Antonio Southwest by a score of 3-2 in 2OT off a 97th-minute goal by a freshman. Walnut Grove once again won the Class 5A/D1 Boys Soccer State Championship in 2026, following a 2-0 victory over College Station.

As of the 2024-25 school year, Walnut Grove High School is a part of 5A Division 2 District 4 in football. Other schools in this district are Anna High School, Denison High School, Frisco Emerson High School, Frisco Independence High School, Frisco Liberty High School, Frisco Memorial High School, Lucas Lovejoy High School, and Melissa High School. With the caliber of schools involved, some have referred to it as the "District of Doom".

In other sports, Walnut Grove is a part of 5A Region 2 District 9, along with Anna, Denison, Greenville, Lovejoy, McKinney North, Melissa, and Sherman.

Walnut Grove's first program wins in each sport were on the following dates:

- Baseball – February 29, 2024 (against McKinney Boyd, 6-2)
- Boys' basketball – November 10, 2023 (against Ponder, 68-52)
- Girls' basketball – November 3, 2023 (against Sherman, 37-35)
- Football – August 25, 2023 (against Malvern (AR) 57-54)
- Boys' soccer – January 5, 2024 (against Irving, 3-1)
- Girls' soccer – January 5, 2024 (against Paris, 9-0)
- Softball – February 13, 2024 (against Lovejoy, 8-2)
- Volleyball – August 8, 2023 (against Decatur, 3-1)

Walnut Grove opened as a UIL Class 5A school. As it opened in between realignment periods, the school played the 2023 football season without a district, having to play multiple private schools and out of state teams in order to create a schedule. This included Malvern High School in Arkansas and the Cathedral Fighting Irish from El Paso at a neutral site.
