= Princeton Independent School District =

School district in Texas, United States

Address
- 804 Mabel Avenue Princeton, Collin, Texas, 75407; United States

District information
- Type: Public
- Motto: Inspiring Potential, Enabling Success.
- Grades: PK-12
- Established: 1898; 128 years ago
- President: Carlos Cuellar
- Vice-president: Starla Sharpe
- Superintendent: Donald McIntyre
- Schools: 17
- Budget: $133 million (2025-26)
- NCES District ID: 4835850
- District ID: TX-043911

Students and staff
- Enrollment: 11,388 (October 2025)
- Teachers: 623 (2024-25)
- Staff: 1802 (August 2026)

Other information
- Website: www.princetonisd.net

Princeton Independent School District is a suburban public school district based in Princeton, Texas (USA). The district covers 60 square miles (160 km^{2}), serving not only the city of Princeton but also the surrounding communities of Culleoka, Lowry Crossing, Branch, Climax and the west side of Lake Lavon.

== TEA Accountability Ratings ==
Since 2018 Princeton ISD has received an 'A' rating (equivalent to previous rating system 'exemplary') by the Texas Education Agency.

- 2025-2026: 81 - B
- 2024-2025: 81 - B
- 2023-2024: 80 - B
- 2022-2023: 81 - B
- 2021-2022: 93 - A
- 2020-2021: none awarded due to COVID-19
- 2019-2020: none awarded due to COVID-19
- 2018-2019: 90 - A
  - Note - standards changed beginning with the 2022-2023 school year.

== Schools ==
High schools (grades 9-12)
Name	Grades	Established	Mascot	Capacity	Additional information
Lovelady High School	9-10	2021	Panthers	1800	9th-only from 2021-2024
Princeton Senior High School	11-12	2004	Panthers	1800	Formerly Princeton High School; Renamed in 2021

Middle schools (grades 6-8)
Name	Established	Mascot	Capacity	Additional information
Banschbach Middle School	2026	Jaguars	1000	
Clark Middle School	1986	Panthers	700	Formerly Princeton High School; Renamed in 2004
Southard Middle School	2019	Panthers	1000	
Mattei Middle School	2023	Jaguars	1000	

Primary schools
Name	Grades	Established	Capacity	Additional information
Canup Early Childhood Center	PK	2020	300	Located in the former Huddleston Intermediate building
Carrell Elementary School	K-5	2026	700	
Godwin Elementary School	K-5	2004	700	
Green Elementary School	K-5	2024	700	
Harper Elementary School	K-5	2008	700	
James Elementary School	K-5	2024	700	
Lacy Elementary School	K-5	????	750	Formerly Princeton Elementary; Renamed in 2004
Lowe Elementary School	K-5	2019	750	
Mayfield Elementary School	K-5	2022	700	
Perkins Early Childhood Center	PK	2025	300	
Smith Elementary School	K-5	2015	750	

Future schools
Name	Grades	Scheduled opening	Additional information
Abbott Elementary School	K-5	2027	
Anthony High School	9-12	2029	Will eventually become a 11-12 senior high school
Hill Elementary School	K-5	2030	Originally scheduled to open in 2031
McMahon Middle School	6-8	2030	Originally scheduled to open in 2032
Talley Elementary School	K-5	2027	Originally scheduled to open in 2030

== Programs ==
The District runs Princeton ISD 2022-2027 District of Innovation Plan that dates back to January 12, 2017.

== Stadium ==
Jackie Hendricks Stadium, formerly known as Panther Stadium, was built in the 1950s. For the 2009 school year, the stadium received a major renovation and was renamed after Jackie Paul Hendricks, a teacher and coach at Princeton High School. In this renovation, the south side visitors bleachers were removed and replaced with a new home side stands and press box, resulting in the visitors section being relocated to the north side. For the 2025 school year, the stadium received a $13.5 million dollar renovation, including a new athletic office, parking lot, scoreboard, locker rooms, and moving the home side back to the north with an all-new home stands and press box.

== Administration ==
The district is led by Superintendent Donald McIntyre, CATE Director Connor Hackman and four trustees: Board President Carlos Cuellar, Vice President Starla Sharpe, Secretary Bianca Washington, Sonia Ledezma, Cyndi Darland, Duane Kelly & John Campbell.
