= Princeton, Texas =

- City
- Princeton Municipal Center

- Location of Princeton, Texas
- Coordinates: 33.184474°N 96.509393°W
- Country: United States
- State: Texas
- County: Collin
- Founded: 1881
- Incorporated: May 1912

Government
  - Type: Council–Manager
  - Honorable Mayor: Eugene Escobar, Jr.
  - Alternate City manager: James Waters
  - Councilmembers: Terrance Johnson; Cristina Todd; Bryan Washington - (Mayor Pro Tem); Jaisen Rutledge; Steven Deffibaugh; Ben Long; Carolyn David-Graves

Area
  - Total: 14.224 sq mi (36.840 km^{2})
  - Land: 14.118 sq mi (36.565 km^{2})
  - Water: 0.106 sq mi (0.274 km^{2}) 0.75%
- Elevation: 587 ft (179 m)

Population (2020)
  - Total: 17,027
  - Estimate (2025): 43,524
  - Density: 2,622/sq mi (1,012.4/km^{2})
- Time zone: UTC–6 (Central (CST))
  - Summer (DST): UTC–5 (CDT)
- ZIP Codes: 75407
- Area codes: 214, 469, 972, 945
- FIPS code: 48-59576
- GNIS feature ID: 2411493
- Sales tax: 8.25%
- Website: princetontx.gov

Princeton is a city in Collin County, Texas, United States. The population was 17,027 at the 2020 census, and was estimated to be 43,524 in 2025. Princeton, Texas, as of 2025, is currently the fastest-growing city in the United States. Its population surged by 30% in just one year, making it the fastest-growing city or town in the country, according to the U.S. Census Bureau.

== History ==
In the late 1870s T. B. Wilson and his brother George began farming near the site of future Princeton. In 1881, the Missouri, Kansas and Texas Railroad Company extended its line from Greenville to McKinney, passing through land owned by the brothers. The name "Wilson's Switch" was commonly used to designate the area. When residents applied for a post office branch, however, they learned that the name Wilson was already being used. The community then submitted the name "Princeton" in honor of Prince Dowlin, a landowner and promoter of the town. This name was accepted, and a post office was established in 1888.

In 1940, a camp of 76 cabins was built west of Princeton to house up to 400 migrant workers, who came to work during the onion and cotton seasons. In February 1945, the site became a prisoner-of-war camp for German prisoners captured during the Second World War. The local farmers paid the POWs to work on their farms. This operation continued for eight months. Under a special bill, the German prisoners were contracted to work on the City Park located across from city hall. The park was built as a living memorial and shrine to those who served and died during World War II. The Community Park/WWII P.O.W. Camp is located at 500 West College Street.

Members of the Princeton Independent School District and the Princeton Lions Club have teamed up annually to hold the Princeton Onion Festival. It is a major festival for the town that began in 2005 and is expected to occur on the fourth Saturday of April each year.

== Geography ==
Princeton is located just east of the center of Collin County. It is bordered to the west by Lowry Crossing. U.S. Route 380 passes through Princeton, leading west 8 miles (13 km) to McKinney, the county seat, and east 8 miles (13 km) to Farmersville. According to the United States Census Bureau, the city has a total area of 14.224 square miles (36.84 km^{2}), of which 14.118 square miles (36.57 km^{2}) is land and 0.106 square miles (0.27 km^{2}) (0.75%) is water.

=== Boundary history ===
On June 30, 2011, a Collin County District Court Judge issued a judgment ending a legal dispute over Princeton's southern boundary. The judgment ruled against the city, finding that the tract of land in question had not been annexed and was not lawfully within the city limits. The case was filed on January 12, 2010 and was titled: The State of Texas Ex Rel. Collin County, Texas vs. The City of Princeton, Texas, Case No. 401-00108-2010.

The State of Texas' Motion for Summary Judgment stated "that Princeton administration had 'unlawfully and improperly attempted to assert jurisdiction over a tract of land which the city never annexed and which is not lawfully within the corporate city limits,' according to Collin County court records."" "Tract Five, the property in question, is a strip of land that runs the length of the right of way of Farm to Market Road 982 from about a half mile south of U.S. Highway 380 to its intersection with FM Road 546." "The southern portion of this tract was incorporated as part of the city of Branch from August of 1971 through April of 1977." "After three months in which no response of any kind was received from the city (of Princeton) in regard to the matter, the (approximately 100) landowners concluded that the city (of Princeton) was ignoring (them) and decided in November (of 2006) to refer the matter to the Collin County District Attorney for possible legal action." The landowners "provided all of the documentation" (to the D.A.)...

"The state's quo warranto motion, filed in November 2010, claimed that Princeton was wrongfully exercising powers not authorized by any law or statute and that a judgment on the case could be made without a trial and instead based solely on Princeton city records." "Princeton officials first claimed the 5.5-mile strip of land as part of the city limits in 2003, but according to the state's motion, the 'contorted history of Tract Five and the City's current efforts to effectively annex by stealth began in 1971.'" "In January 1971, the city enacted Ordinance No. 104, through which Princeton attempted to annex certain right-of-ways surrounding the city by a process commonly referred to as 'strip annexation.'" "Princeton City Council passed a motion to annex five tracts, but in April of that year, the council passed another motion to eliminate Tract Five from the proposed annexations." "Texas Legislature subsequently prohibited 'strip annexation' through procedures mandated by Chapter 43 of the Texas Local Government Code." "All area maps, including one Princeton filed in 2000 with the U.S. Dept. of Justice, show that Tract Five did not belong to Princeton." "Included in the state's original filing on the case in 2010 is a corporate map of Branch that was legally filed in Collin County records in March 1975, showing that Branch owns (sic) the corner of FM 982 and FM 546 and part of the same land Princeton began claiming as its own in 2003." "Robert Davis, specially deputized District Attorney representing the state, said in the state's motion for summary judgment that 'in 2003, realizing that they were prohibited by law from engaging in the type of strip annexation which was accomplished by Ordinance No. 104, the City passed an ordinance which attempted to refute the fact

Using only Princeton's official city records, District Court Judge Ray Wheless ruled: "that Princeton's southern most corporate city limit officially extends to approximately 0.6 miles south of the intersection of F.M. Road 982 with U.S. Highway 380 but does NOT include the 5.5-mile stretch to FM 546." "The order brings Princeton's south boundary back to where it stood for nearly 32 years." Princeton's City Council minutes from July 11, 2011 state that "Councilmember Beauchamp made a motion to not appeal the Quo Warranto, Case No. 401-00108-2010. Councilmember Glass seconded the motion. The motion carried unanimously." This decision was reported in The Princeton Herald on July 14, 2011 by Jamie Engle under the title, "City manager terminated, no appeal in 982 case."

== Demographics ==
Historical population
Census	Pop.	Note	%±
1920	500		—
1930	459		−8.2%
1940	564		22.9%
1950	540		−4.3%
1960	594		10.0%
1970	1,105		86.0%
1980	3,408		208.4%
1990	2,321		−31.9%
2000	3,477		49.8%
2010	6,807		95.8%
2020	17,027		150.1%
2025 (est.)	43,524		155.6%
U.S. Decennial Census; 2020 Census

=== Racial and ethnic composition ===
Princeton, Texas – racial and ethnic composition Note: the US Census treats Hispanic/Latino as an ethnic category. This table excludes Latinos from the racial categories and assigns them to a separate category. Hispanics/Latinos may be of any race.
Race / ethnicity (NH = non-Hispanic)	Pop. 2000	Pop. 2010	Pop. 2020	% 2000	% 2010	% 2020
White alone (NH)	2,980	4,526	7,605	85.71%	66.49%	44.66%
Black or African American alone (NH)	32	411	2,535	0.92%	6.04%	14.89%
Native American or Alaska Native alone (NH)	33	33	85	0.95%	0.48%	0.50%
Asian alone (NH)	10	74	598	0.29%	1.09%	3.51%
Pacific Islander alone (NH)	0	2	8	0.00%	0.03%	0.05%
Other race alone (NH)	0	5	84	0.00%	0.07%	0.49%
Mixed race or multiracial (NH)	43	107	827	1.24%	1.57%	4.86%
Hispanic or Latino (any race)	379	1,649	5,285	10.90%	24.23%	31.04%
Total	3,477	6,807	17,027	100.00%	100.00%	100.00%

=== 2020 census ===
As of the 2020 census, there were 17,027 people, 5,294 households, and 4,282 families residing in the city. The population density was 1,686.2 inhabitants per square mile (651.0/km^{2}). There were 5,494 housing units at an average density of 543.96 per square mile (210.0/km^{2}).

The median age was 30.6 years; 32.1% of residents were under the age of 18 and 7.2% of residents were 65 years of age or older. For every 100 females there were 94.3 males, and for every 100 females age 18 and over there were 90.9 males age 18 and over.

There were 5,294 households in Princeton, of which 52.3% had children under the age of 18 living in them. Of all households, 59.3% were married-couple households, 11.7% were households with a male householder and no spouse or partner present, and 21.6% were households with a female householder and no spouse or partner present. About 13.9% of all households were made up of individuals and 4.9% had someone living alone who was 65 years of age or older.

There were 5,494 housing units, of which 3.6% were vacant. The homeowner vacancy rate was 1.2% and the rental vacancy rate was 4.8%.

According to the 2020 census, 97.2% of residents lived in urban areas, while 2.8% lived in rural areas.

Racial composition as of the 2020 census
Race	Number	Percent
White	8,886	52.2%
Black or African American	2,610	15.3%
American Indian and Alaska Native	187	1.1%
Asian	622	3.7%
Native Hawaiian and Other Pacific Islander	15	0.1%
Some other race	1,981	11.6%
Two or more races	2,726	16.0%
Hispanic or Latino (of any race)	5,285	31.0%

=== 2010 census ===
As of the 2010 census, there were 6,807 people, 2,288 households, and _ families residing in the city. The population density was 920.0 inhabitants per square mile (355.2/km^{2}). There were 2,533 housing units at an average density of 342.30 per square mile (132.2/km^{2}). The racial makeup of the city was 78.30% White, 6.36% African American, 0.72% Native American, 1.20% Asian, 0.03% Pacific Islander, 10.71% from some other races and 2.67% from two or more races. Hispanic or Latino people of any race were 24.23% of the population.

=== American Community Survey ===
As of the 2023 American Community Survey, there are 6,809 estimated households in Princeton with an average of 3.07 persons per household. The city has a median household income of $96,766. Approximately 5.3% of the city's population lives at or below the poverty line. Princeton has an estimated 75.4% employment rate, with 28.3% of the population holding a bachelor's degree or higher and 90.9% holding a high school diploma.

The top five reported ancestries (people were allowed to report up to two ancestries, thus the figures will generally add to more than 100%) were English (72.0%), Spanish (18.1%), Indo-European (3.5%), Asian and Pacific Islander (2.3%), and Other (4.1%). The median age in the city was 32.9 years.

== Government ==
Princeton is a Home Rule City.

The city is governed by a City Council. The city also has a Community Development Corporation and an Economic Development Corporation.

=== History of Government ===
Historically, Princeton was a Type A General Law city, but its council members have tried to get a Home Rule form of government passed four times: in November 2007, May 2008, November 2008, and May 2014. Princeton voters rejected Home Rule each time: 149 to 117 in November 2007, 239 to 165 in May 2008, 979 to 449 in November 2008, and 260 to 151 in May 2014. Home Rule cities can tax property at a higher rate than General Law cities, because the tax rate ceiling of Home Rule cities is $2.50 per $100 valuation, while the tax rate ceiling of General Law cities is $1.50 per $100 valuation. Home Rule cities can assess additional property taxes, while a General Law city has "no inherent power to tax." Besides additional property taxes, Home Rule cities are allowed to tax almost anything specified in its charter, while General Law cities cannot, because they have no charter.

In January 2015, a year long transparency study of 113 area cities, counties, and school districts was completed by The Dallas Morning News. Seven reporters sent out and tracked 565 open record requests for public information from 113 entities. They asked for public information that was clearly allowed by law. They also tested government websites to see if they were user-friendly for citizen inspection. Grades ranged from A to F. Princeton was among only three cities which earned an F. By contrast, twenty-four neighboring cities earned an A. If a government did poorly on this survey, it is a cause for citizen concern, because responding to open records requests is a basic function of government. Cities were graded according to their responses. The City of "Princeton was among the worst in the Transparency 2015 ratings. It ranked as bad in request best practices, bad in request compliance, good in web customer service and excellent in online meeting notice."

In 2017 and 2019, the Texas legislature passed two laws which ended forced annexation. The 2017 law applied only to sixteen Texas counties, but the 2019 law applies to all 254 Texas counties. In 2017, Gov. Greg Abbott said, "Residents from across the state that have expressed their concerns about feeling abused by the annexation process have had their voices heard. I’m proud to sign legislation ending forced annexation practices, which is nothing more than a form of taxation without representation, and I thank the legislature for their attention to this important issue during the special session." A restriction on this law was that it ended forced annexation only in Texas counties with more than 500,000 people.

On May 24, 2019, a new law went into effect extending the 2017 law. This new law ended forced annexation in all 254 Texas counties, not just the sixteen counties with populations over 500,000. At the signing, Gov. Abbott said, "…Forced annexation is when cities annex property without the approval of the people and businesses that are affected. This means that cities can impose new regulations and higher taxes on Texans who purposefully choose to live outside of city limits. It’s a form of taxation without representation and it will not be tolerated in Texas…"

On November 8, 2022, Princeton brought the Home Rule issue before its voters for the fifth time since 2007. This time, most of the administrators, who had been in favor of a ten square mile land grab that violated Texas law during the years of 2003 to 2011, were no longer in office. More Princeton voters turned out for this election than ever before with a total of 4,065 votes cast. The final tally was put online by the Collin County Elections Office on November 18, 2022. Home Rule passed by a vote of 2,266 FOR (~56%) and 1,799 (~44%) AGAINST. The final tally can be found on the Collin County website under the title, "November 8, 2022 General and Special Election Combined Accumulated Totals.pdf (38 pages)."

== Finances ==
Standard and Poor’s updated the City’s bond rating in February 2021 to a "AA−" from a "AA". Fitch Ratings raised the City's 2020, 2021, and 2022 certificates of obligation (COs) and 2021 general obligation bonds to AA+

=== History of Finances ===
A Fitch business report for Princeton, dated October 9, 2012 is titled: "Fitch Affirms Princeton, Texas GOs and COs at 'A−'; Outlook Negative." The key rating drivers for the negative outlook are Princeton's diminished reserves, increased tax rates, slowed tax base growth, above average debt, and the city's inability to replenish unrestricted general fund balances to levels that provide adequate operating flexibility and financial cushion. The negative outlook reflects the trend of operating deficits in recent years, culminating in a negative general fund balance at the close of fiscal 2011. The fiscal 2011 net deficit was $4.2 million. The fiscal 2013 budget includes an increased ad valorem tax rate to increase funding for maintenance and operations; increased water service rates are also included in the budget. Fitch notes the city's ad valorem tax rate is above average for Texas municipalities. Overall debt is above average at 5.2% of market value despite state support for overlapping school district debt and support for direct city debt by the utility system. GO debt amortization remains below average with 36.8% of principal scheduled for repayment within 10 years. A newer Fitch report, dated August 27, 2013, shows Princeton's business outlook improved from "Negative" to "Stable."

== Education ==
The city is served by Princeton Independent School District.
