= Prosper Independent School District =

US school district in Prosper, Texas

Address
- 605 E 7th St, Prosper, Texas, 75078 Prosper, Texas United States

District information
- Type: Public
- Motto: Grounded by Tradition, Soaring to New Beginnings
- Grades: PK-12
- Superintendent: Dr. Holly Ferguson
- Deputy superintendent(s): Mr. Jeff Crownover; Mr. Bill McLaughlin
- Chair of the board: Bill Beavers
- Schools: Early Childhood: 1 Elementary: 20; Middle: 6 High: 4
- Budget: 362.7 million USD (2024–2025)
- NCES District ID: 4836000
- District ID: TX-043912

Students and staff
- Students: 32,197 (2025-2026)
- Teachers: 1,597.27 (2020–2021)
- Staff: 2,656.46 (2024-2025)
- Student–teacher ratio: 18:1

Other information
- Phone Number: (469)219-2000
- Website: www.prosper-isd.net

Prosper Independent School District (PISD or Prosper ISD) is a public school district based in Prosper, Texas, United States. Located in Collin County, a portion of the district extends into Denton County.

The district enrollment was 32,197 as of the 2025-26 school year.

The town of Prosper continues to experience large population growth. In the 2018-19 school year, the district enrollment was 14,287 with 1 High School and 2 Middle Schools. In the 2020-21 school year, the enrollment was 19,140 students. In the 2025-26 school year, the enrollment was 32,197 students, with 4 High Schools and 6 Middle Schools in the district.

In 2011, the school district was rated "Recognized" by the Texas Education Agency.

Prosper ISD has its own police department separate from the Town of Prosper Police. This is because PISD covers areas and has schools in six municipalities (Prosper, Texas; Celina, Texas; Frisco, Texas; McKinney, Texas; Aubrey, Texas; Collin County; and Denton County). A Town of Prosper police officer would only have jurisdiction in the town of Prosper, while a PISD officer can cover any school in any area of Prosper ISD.

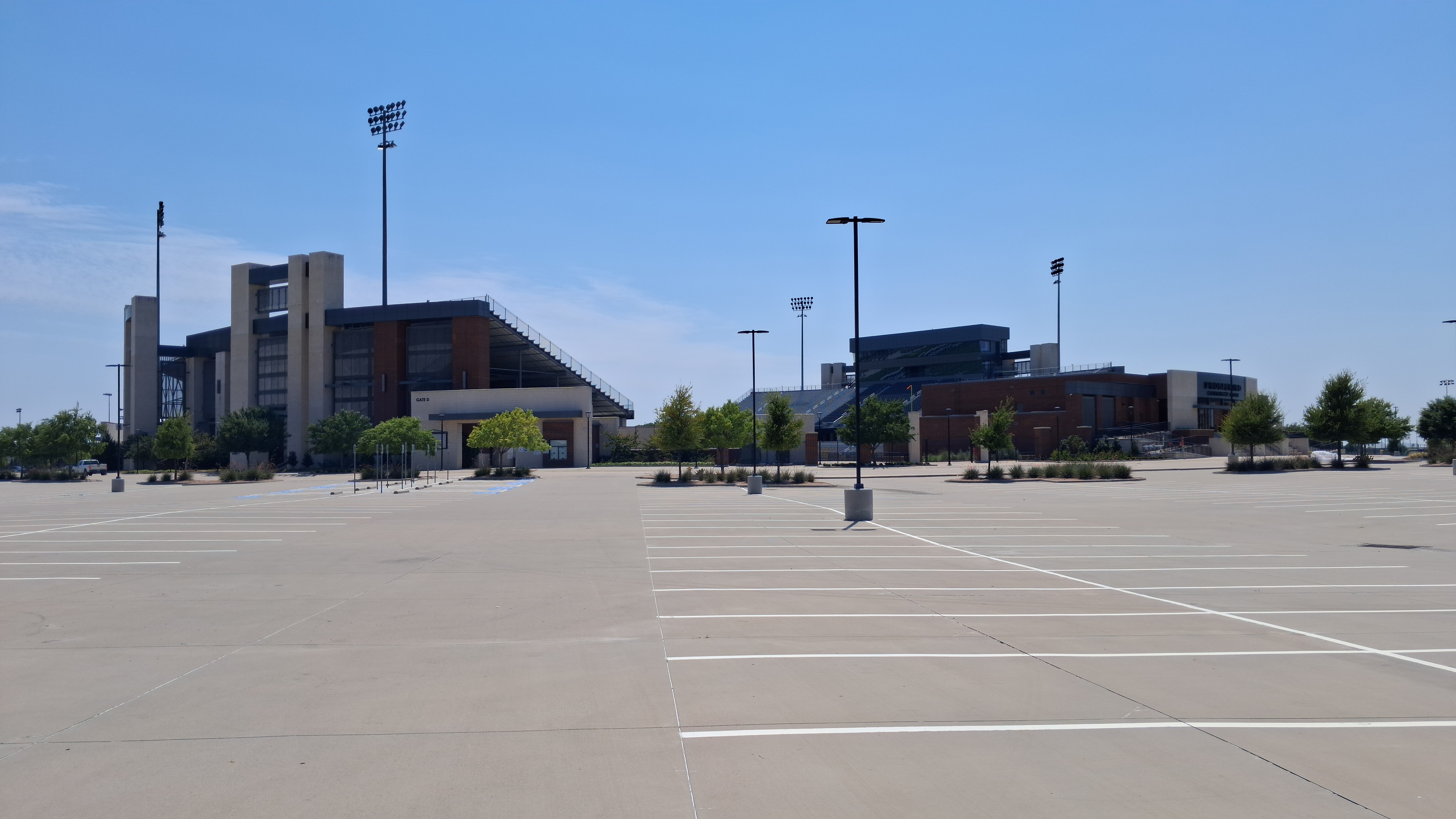
Stadium view Gate D

== History ==
Prosper School was established in 1902. It had 4 classrooms, 3 teachers, and 100 students. It was sold and moved off in 1910, with a new school opening on the same site in 1911. The new campus had 9 classrooms, 5 teachers, and housed grades 1-10. This school caught fire and was replaced in 1923. The 3rd campus built on this site also had 9 classrooms and 5 teachers, but housed grades 1-11.

Around 1935, Prosper ISD consolidated with many local school districts. These included Richland, Rockhill, Franklin, Hutcherson (White Elephant), Walnut Grove, Pleasant Ridge (Possum Trot), Rheas Mill, and Bloomdale. Some of the buildings from the other schools were moved to the site of Prosper School.

In 1942, the mascot of Prosper School changed from the Deer to the Eagle.

In 1963, Prosper School moved to a new location. It had 6 elementary classrooms, 9 secondary classrooms, 14 teachers, and 237 students in grades 1-12.

In 1995, Prosper Elementary opened with grades PK-4.

In 2000, a new Prosper High School was built for grades 9-12. Prosper Middle School was established at the 1963 campus with grades 5-8.

In 2005, Folsom Elementary opened with grades PK-3. Prosper Elementary was renamed Rucker Elementary and hosted grades 4-5, with Prosper Middle School hosting grades 6-8.

In 2006, Pre-K and 6th grade moved to Rucker, freeing up space at Folsom (K-3) and Prosper Middle School (7-8).

In 2007, Baker Elementary opened, with all three elementary schools now hosting grades PK-6.

In 2008, Rogers Middle School opened with grades 6-8, replacing Prosper Middle School. The three elementary schools now housed grades PK-5, with Rucker still hosting Head Start. The former Prosper Middle School campus was renovated into Prosper ISD's Administration Building.

In 2009, Prosper High School moved into its new $120 million campus, which was the most expensive high school ever built in Texas at the time.

In 2010, the former Prosper High School building opened after a year of renovations into Reynolds Middle School, housing grades 7-8. With this change, Rogers Middle School housed all PISD 5th and 6th graders, thus all elementary schools became K-4, with a few having PK-4.

In 2012, Cockrell Elementary was opened.

In 2015, Light Farms Elementary was opened.

In 2016, Hughes and Windsong Elementary Schools opened, allowing the district to move from PK-4 elementary campuses to grades PK-5. With this transition, both middle schools hosted grades 6-8.

In 2018, the University Interscholastic League classified Prosper High School as 6A.

In 2019, Children's Health Stadium opened as a 12,000 seat stadium for Prosper ISD football games. With this addition, Prosper High School played home games at Children's Health Stadium, moving away from the relatively tiny Eagle Stadium near Reynolds Middle School. Children's Health Hospital paid $2.5 million for the naming rights to the stadium.

The same year, Hays Middle School opened, becoming the first school in Prosper ISD with an animal other than an Eagle as their mascot or with school colors other than green and white. Hays uses the Hawk as their mascot and uses the primary school color blue. Rock Hill High School, into which Hays feeds, used the Blue Hawks as the school's mascot and blue as the primary school color when it opened in 2020.

In 2020, Rock Hill High School opened, meaning Prosper ISD had more than one high school for the first time in district history. Rock Hill High School was built for roughly $200 million, making it the most expensive high school built in Texas at the time. That fall, Prosper also opened Johnson Elementary School, named after Representative Sam Johnson, and Rushing Middle School, named after former superintendent William Rushing.

In 2024, Jones Middle School opened, relieving Rogers and Hays Middle Schools.

In 2025, Moseley Middle School and Richland High School opened while Rogers Middle School changed their mascot to the Wildcat, like Walnut Grove.

In 2026, Rucker Elementary moved into a new campus adjacent to its old facility. The old campus will be repurposed.

The same year, Bridges Middle School opened, relieving Jones and Rogers Middle Schools.

In 2027, Prosper ISD is expected to open Watkins Middle School, possibly relieving Rushing and Reynolds Middle Schools, as well as Elementary School #22.

== Schools ==
High schools (grades 9-12)
Name	Established	Mascot	Colors	Location	Additional information
Prosper High School	1902	Eagles	Green & White	Prosper	Established as Prosper School in 1902; relocated in 2000, 2009
Richland High School	2025	Raider	Purple & Black	Prosper	
Rock Hill High School	2020	Blue Hawks	Blue & Black	Frisco	
Walnut Grove High School	2023	Wildcats	Navy & Silver	Prosper	

Middle schools (grades 6-8)
Name	Established	Mascot	Colors	Location	Additional information
Jim Bridges Middle School	2026	Bulldogs	Navy & Red	Celina	
Bill Hays Middle School	2019	Hawks	Columbia & Gold	Frisco	
Daniel L. Jones Middle School	2024	Jaguars	Blue & White	Frisco	
W.H. Moseley Middle School	2025	Mustangs	Maroon & Charcoal	Prosper	
Robert and Robbie Reynolds Middle School	2010	Eagles	Green & White	Prosper	Building was originally Prosper High from 2000-2009
Lorene Rogers Middle School	2008	Wildcats	Navy & Gray	Prosper	Replaced Prosper Middle School; used Eagles mascot until 2025
William Rushing Middle School	2020	Raptors	Purple & Gray	Prosper	

Elementary schools (grades K-5)
Name	Established	Location	Additional information
John Baker Elementary School	2007	McKinney	Elementary School #3
Ralph & Mary Lynn Boyer Elementary School	2018	Celina	Elementary School #8
Mrs. Jerry Bryant Elementary School	2021	Prosper	Elementary School #13
Judy Cockrell Elementary School	2012	Prosper	Elementary School #4
Dan Christie Elementary School	2023	Celina	Elementary School #17
R. Steve Folsom Elementary School	2005	Prosper	Elementary School #2
Jack & June Furr Elementary School	2019	McKinney	Elementary School #10
Joyce Hall Elementary School	2022	Prosper	Elementary School #15
Jim & Betty Hughes Elementary School	2016	McKinney	Elementary School #7
Betty Jackson Elementary School	2024	Frisco	Elementary School #18
Sam Johnson Elementary School	2020	Celina	Elementary School #12
Light Farms Elementary School	2015	Celina	Elementary School #5
Lilyana Elementary School	2023	Celina	Elementary School #16
Mike and Janie Reeves Elementary School	2021	McKinney	Elementary School #14
Judy Rucker Elementary School	1995	Prosper	Elementary School #1/#21; Name changed from Prosper Elementary in 2005; New campus opened adjacent to original in 2026
Virgie Smothermon Elementary School	2025	Celina	Elementary School #20
Jim Spradley Elementary School	2018	Frisco	Elementary School #9
Chuck & Cindy Stuber Elementary School	2019	Prosper	Elementary School #11
Jana Thomson Elementary School	2025	Prosper	Elementary School #19
Windsong Ranch Elementary School	2016	Prosper	Elementary School #6

Other campuses
Name	Grades	Established	Location	Additional information
Brenda Calhoun Early Childhood School	EE-PK	2023	McKinney	
Disciplinary Alternative Education Placement	DAEP	2014	Prosper	Located in 1963 building

Future campuses
Name	Grades	Projected opening	Location	Additional information
Dr. Drew and Kristen Watkins Middle School	6-8	2027	Prosper	Middle School #8
Unnamed Elementary School	K-5	2027	Unknown	Elementary School #22
Unnamed Elementary School	K-5	2028	Unknown	Elementary School #23
Unnamed High School	9-12	Unknown	McKinney	High School #5; Located in the eastern portion of the district
Unnamed Elementary School	K-5	2029	Unknown	Elementary School #24
Unnamed Elementary School	K-5	Unknown	Unknown	Elementary School #25
Unnamed High School	9-12	Unknown	Prosper	High School #6; Located near Moseley MS; Unfunded
Unnamed Elementary School	K-5	2031	Unknown	Elementary School #26
Unnamed Elementary School	K-5	2031	Unknown	Elementary School #27
Unnamed Middle School	6-8	2032	Unknown	Middle School #9; Unfunded

Former schools
Name	Established	Closed	Additional information
Prosper School #1	1902	1910	Building sold in 1910
Prosper School #2	1911	1923	Built at site of Prosper School #1; caught fire and was replaced
Prosper School #3	1923	1963	Built at site of Prosper Schools #1 and #2
Prosper School #4	1963	2000	New location
Prosper Middle School	2000	2008	Established at site of Prosper School #4; was renovated into Prosper ISD Administration Building
Judy Rucker Elementary School	1995	2026	Name changed from Prosper Elementary in 2005; repurposed for district use.

== Criticism ==
In September 2015, Greg Wright created controversy for the school and the Prosper School District as reported in the Dallas Morning News when he was caught criticizing a teacher that reported another teacher from PHS to the police for inappropriately touching a student.

In 2018, two editorials were removed from Prosper High School's student newspaper. John Burdett, the principal of the school, claimed that it put the school in an incorrectly assessed negative position. The students claimed that they would be censored if they tried to criticize the school.

In 2022, a bus driver from Prosper ISD was accused of sexually abusing two girls "more than 100 times." The bus driver mainly drove buses for an elementary school that fed into Rock Hill, but had also previously served Rock Hill High School students. The victims’ parents eventually found out about the abuse and filed a lawsuit. Prosper ISD fired the bus driver. Neither the district nor the school publicly announced the incident until over three months after the incident. According to the parent lawsuit, the parents of the victims received a phone call from the school's superintendent requesting that the accusations not be made public "so as to not attract media attention to her family or to Prosper ISD staff." This perceived lack of transparency incensed many members of the school's PTA, who called for further investigation in meetings. For further investigation, Prosper ISD hired a firm with ties to the school, although parents and the PTA demanded the school hire an independent third party firm. Several parents have called for the resignation of the superintendent and other high-ranking officials at the high school, with some PTA meetings ending with chants to fire the superintendent. No school administrators have resigned since then, however.

In January 2023, Drew Wilborn, then-president of the Prosper ISD Board of Trustees, resigned following his arrest on a charge of indecency with a child by sexual contact. The incident involved allegations of inappropriate relations with a 16-year-old girl in April 2022, while Wilborn was serving as an executive pastor at Antioch Fellowship Missionary Baptist Church.
