= Prosper, Texas =

- Town
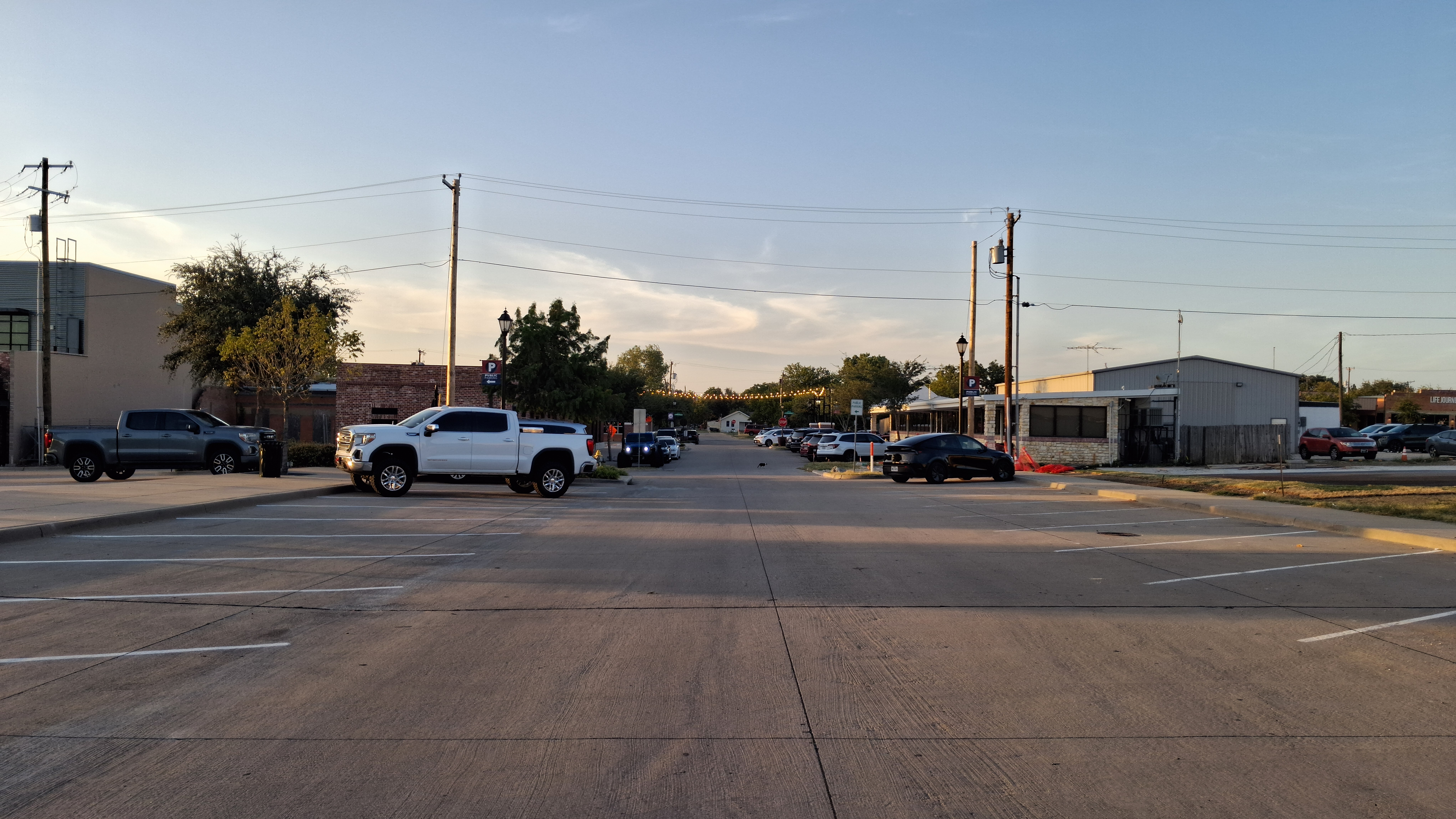
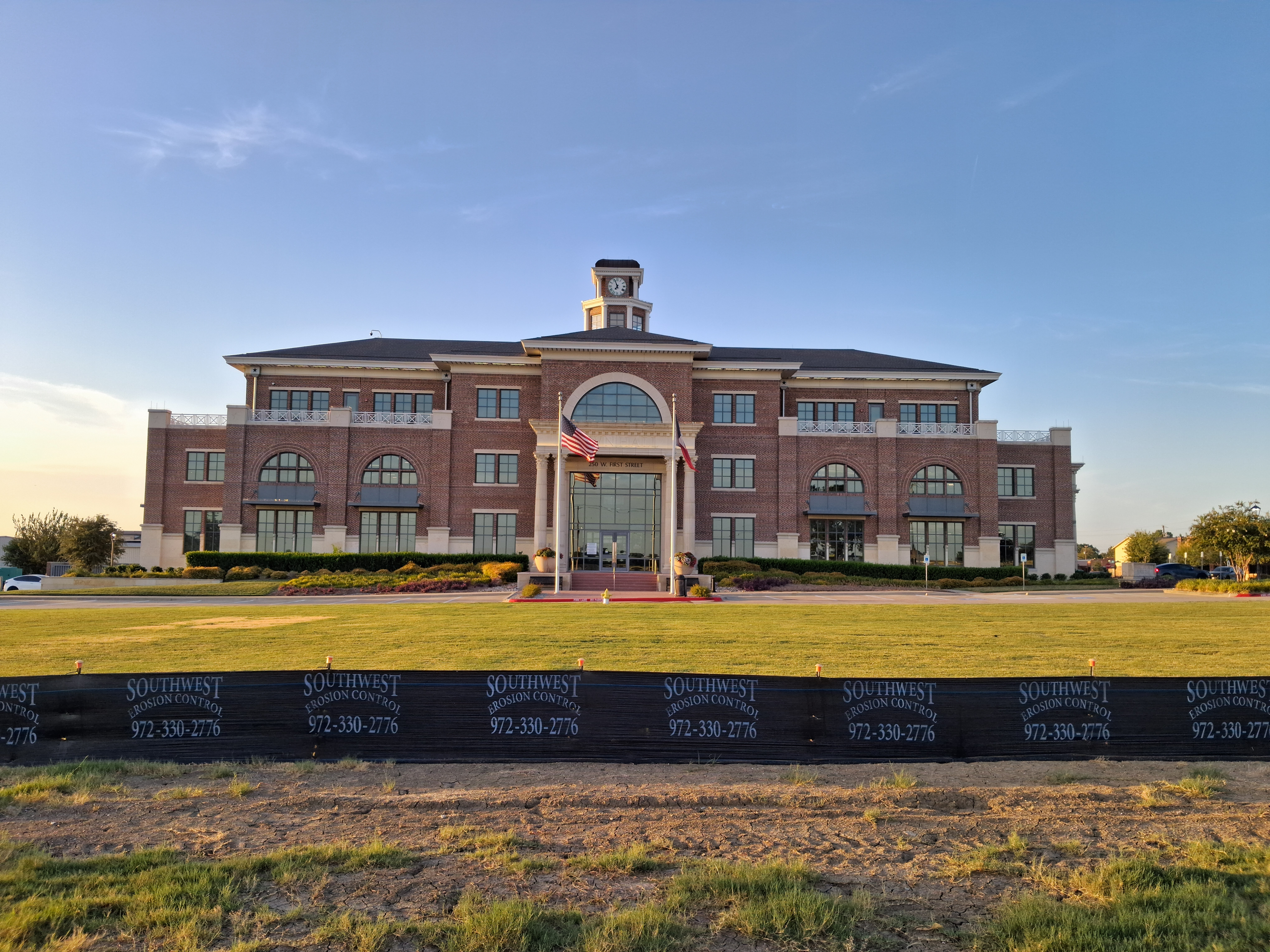
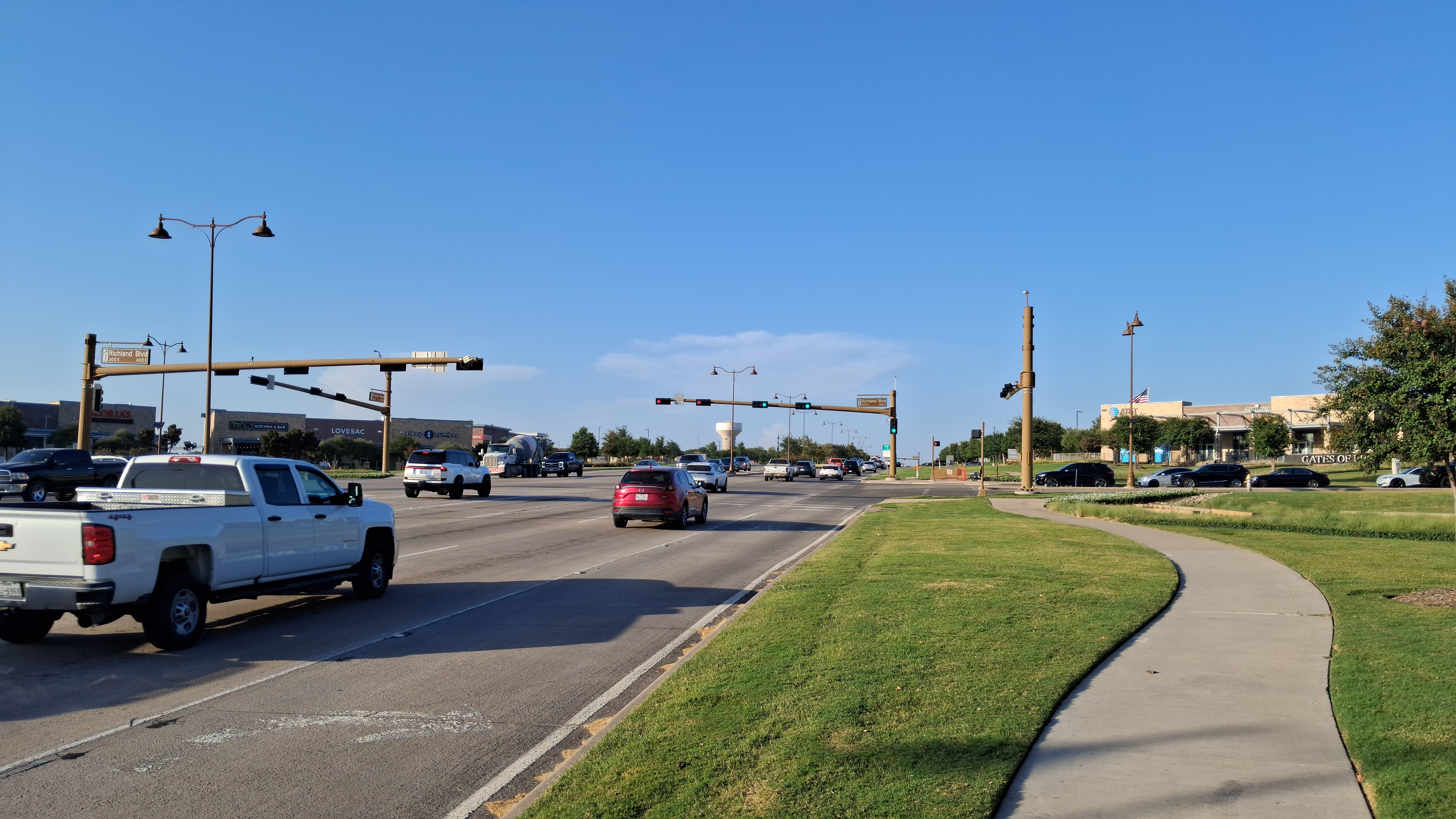
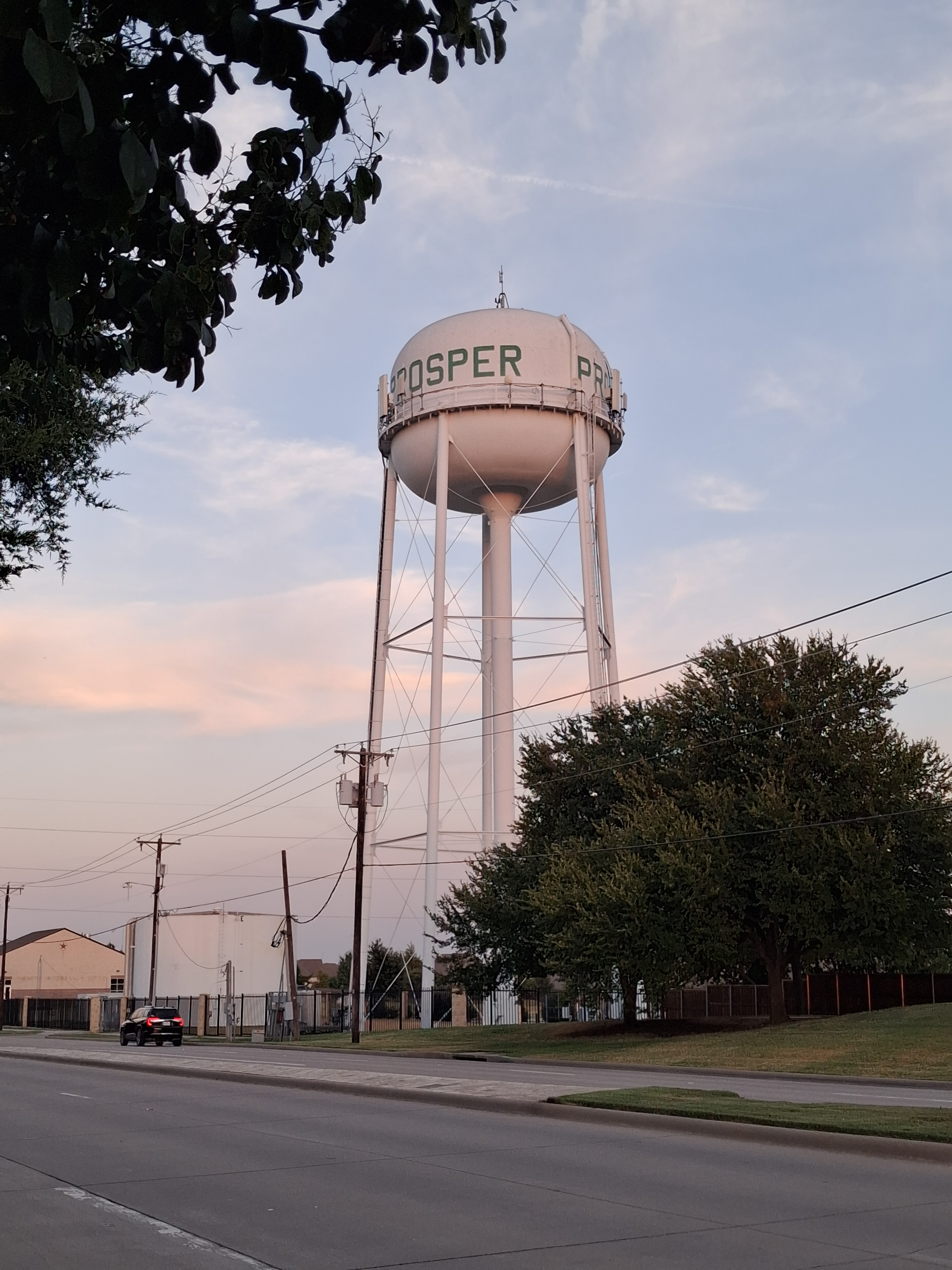
- Main Street Prosper Town Hall Gate Of Prosper Water Tower Prosper

- Mottoes: "A Place Where Everyone Matters" and "Small Town, Big Heart"
- Location of Prosper in Collin County, Texas
- Coordinates: 33°14′45″N 96°50′27″W
- Country: United States
- State: Texas
- Counties: Collin, Denton

Government
  - Type: Council-Manager

Area
  - Total: 25.45 sq mi (65.92 km^{2})
  - Land: 25.23 sq mi (65.34 km^{2})
  - Water: 0.22 sq mi (0.58 km^{2})
- Elevation: 643 ft (196 m)

Population (2020)
  - Total: 30,174
  - Density: 974.3/sq mi (376.18/km^{2})
- Time zone: UTC-6 (Central (CST))
  - Summer (DST): UTC-5 (CDT)
- ZIP code: 75078
- Area codes: 214, 469, 945, 972
- FIPS code: 48-59696
- GNIS feature ID: 2412510
- Website: www.prospertx.gov

Prosper is an affluent suburb in Collin and Denton counties in the U.S. state of Texas. Prosper is located within the Dallas-Fort Worth area. As of the 2010 census, its population was 6,423. As of 2023, the population was 37,746.

== History ==
The first settlers arrived in 1846 to farm cotton in the black fertile prairie soil. Between 1850 and 1902, two settlements existed - Rock Hill was two miles south of the present town, and Richland was one mile north. The development of these small communities was expedited in 1876 when county courts ordered small tracts of land to be established for a quick sale. These tracts, each about 160 acres in size, were sold for $3.50 per acre. Dr. A. T. Bryant of McKinney purchased what later became the center of the present town.

The towns merged during the establishment of the St. Louis & San Francisco Railroad in March 1902. For years, Prosper was the central stop for the railroad between Dallas and Sherman. When community officials applied for a post office with the name "Richland", they were informed that the city name was already taken. Postmaster B.J. Naugle asked for an alternative name, and J.C. Slaughter suggested the name "Prosper" because crops that year had been very prosperous.

Prosper was incorporated in 1914 with a commission form of government and a population of 500. Uncas Norvell Clary was mayor and served in that position for the next 49 years. Prosper became a growing area with many new homes and communities being developed. The Prosper Community of Windsong Ranch features a man-made crystalline lagoon.

== Geography ==
Prosper is located in western Collin County and eastern Denton County.

According to the United States Census Bureau, the town has a total area of 22.8 sq mi (59.1 km^{2}), of which 0.23 sq mi (0.6 km^{2}), or 1.09%, is covered by water.

== Demographics ==
Historical population
Census	Pop.	Note	%±
1970	501		—
1980	675		34.7%
1990	1,018		50.8%
2000	2,097		106.0%
2010	9,423		349.4%
2020	30,174		220.2%
2023 (est.)	41,660	▲	38.1%
U.S. Decennial Census

=== Racial and ethnic composition ===
Prosper, Texas - Racial and ethnic composition (NH = Non-Hispanic) (Note: Note: the US Census treats Hispanic/Latino as an ethnic category. This table excludes Latinos from the racial categories and assigns them to a separate category. Hispanics/Latinos can be of any race.)
Race	Pop 2010	Pop 2020	% 2010	% 2020
White (NH)	7,527	20,678	79.88%	68.53%
Black or African American (NH)	478	2,480	5.07%	8.22%
Native American or Alaska Native (NH)	44	128	0.47%	0.42%
Asian (NH)	176	2,141	1.87%	7.10%
Pacific Islander (NH)	2	19	0.02%	0.06%
Some Other Race (NH)	9	125	0.10%	0.41%
Mixed/Multi-Racial (NH)	174	1,535	1.85%	5.09%
Hispanic or Latino	1,013	3,068	10.75%	10.17%
Total	9,423	30,174	100.00%	100.00%

=== 2020 census ===
As of the 2020 census, Prosper had a population of 30,174, up from 9,423 at the 2010 census.

The median age was 36.4 years. 34.3% of residents were under the age of 18, and 7.4% of residents were 65 years of age or older. For every 100 females there were 99.6 males, and for every 100 females age 18 and over there were 96.7 males age 18 and over.

98.0% of residents lived in urban areas, while 2.0% lived in rural areas.

There were 9,095 households in Prosper, of which 58.1% had children under the age of 18 living in them. Of all households, 79.1% were married-couple households, 7.9% were households with a male householder and no spouse or partner present, and 10.5% were households with a female householder and no spouse or partner present. About 8.6% of all households were made up of individuals, and 2.6% had someone living alone who was 65 years of age or older.

There were 9,869 housing units, of which 7.8% were vacant. The homeowner vacancy rate was 5.3%, and the rental vacancy rate was 6.7%.

=== Income and poverty ===
The median household income as of 2023 was $176,000.

== Economy ==
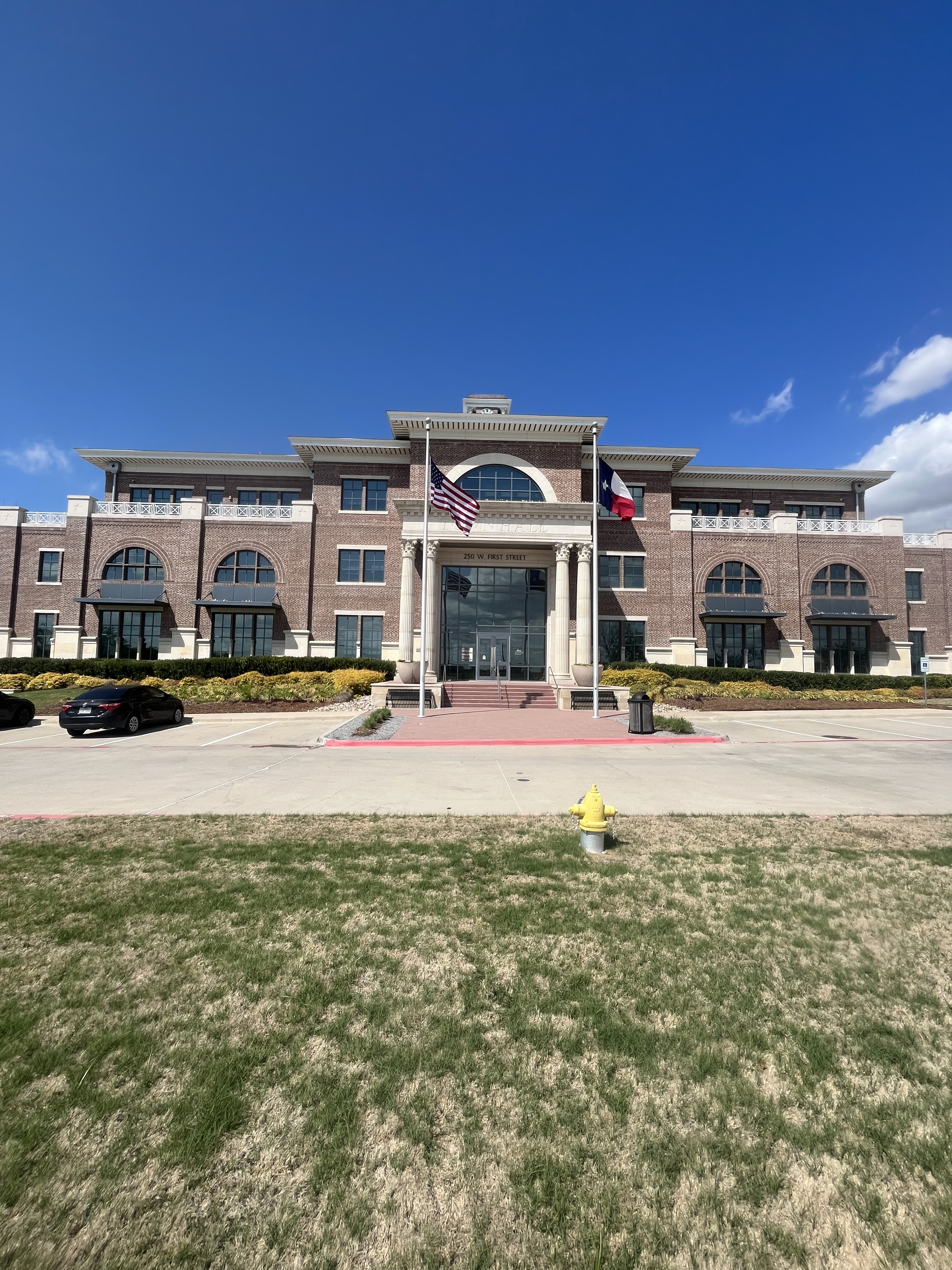
Prosper Town Hall

According to the city's 2023 Comprehensive Annual Financial Report, the top 10 employers in the city are:

#	Employer	# of Employees
1	Prosper Independent School District	3,334
2	Kroger	416
3	Chick Fil A	400
4	Town of Prosper	393
5	Walmart	270
6	Home Depot	185
7	Lowe's	141
8	Cook's Childrens	140
9	Dick's Sporting Goods	78
10	Longo Toyota	66

== Arts and culture ==
Prosper holds an annual Christmas festival and Fourth of July event. Each May, Prosper Founders Fest celebrates its history, people, and arts. The event combines the Prosper Fire Department's "Barbecue Cookoff", a 5K race, an art show, a music festival, and a Sunday Family Fellowship.

== Education ==
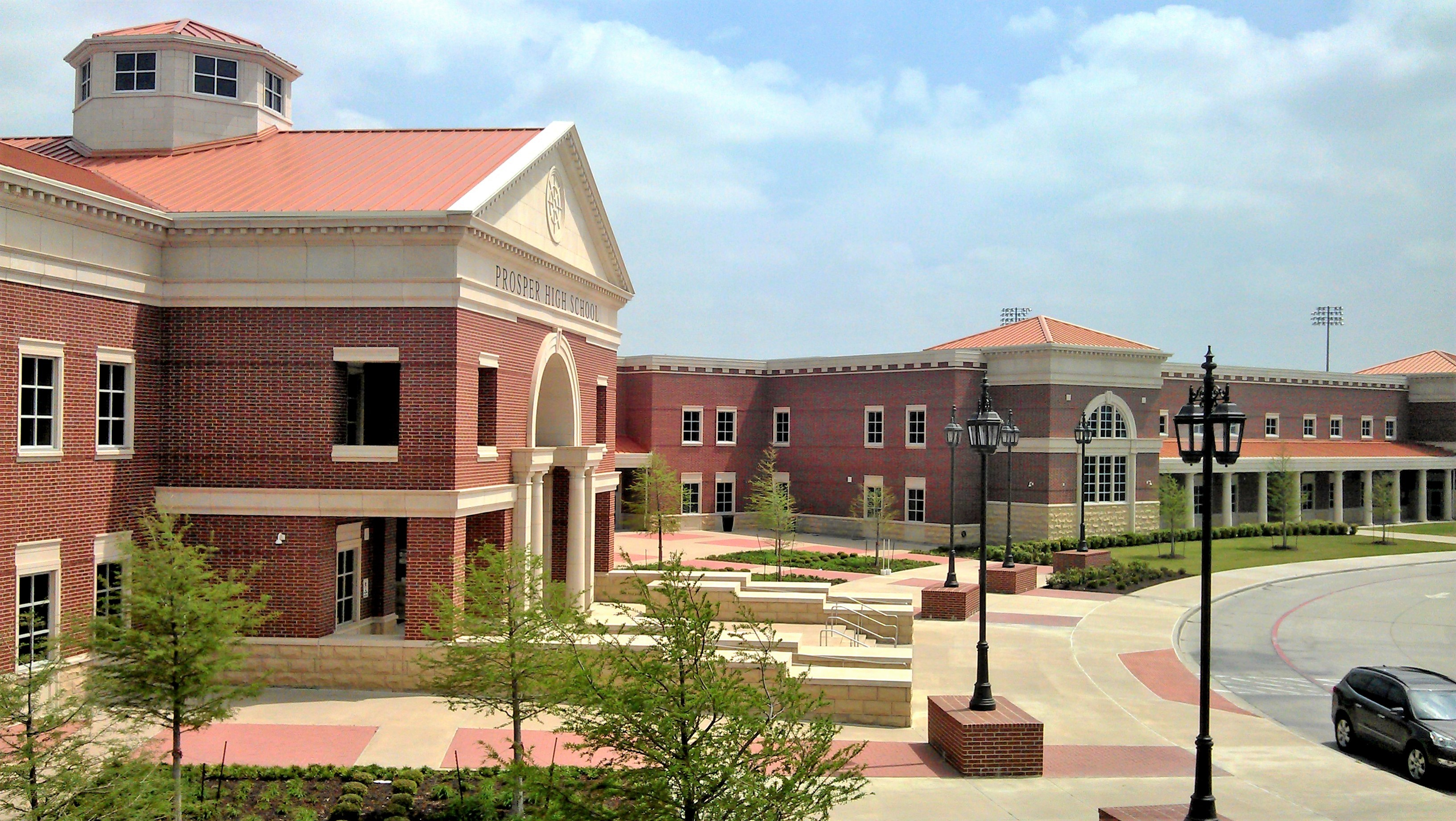
Prosper High School

Most of the Town of Prosper is served by the Prosper Independent School District.

- Prosper High School (grades 9–12)
- Richland High School (grades 9-12)
- Rock Hill High School (grades 9–12, in Frisco)
- Walnut Grove High School (grades 9–12)

In January 2018, Prosper ISD began construction of a natatorium and a football stadium. The facilities opened in the fall of 2019.

Prosper ISD opened its third high school, Walnut Grove High School, in the fall of 2023.

The Glenbrooke and Doe Creek subdivisions in far west Prosper are within the Denton Independent School District. Residents currently attend:

- Savannah Elementary School (grades K–5)
- Navo Middle School (grades 6–8)
- Ray Braswell High School (grades 9–12)

The Texas Legislature designated Collin College as the community college for all of Collin County and for Prosper ISD. The majority of Denton County, including the part of Prosper in Denton ISD, is zoned to North Central Texas College.

== Notable people ==
- Christopher Buescher — NASCAR Cup Series driver for RFK Racing and 2015 NASCAR Xfinity Series Champion
- Matt Carpenter — Major League Baseball player, St. Louis Cardinals, New York Yankees, San Diego Padres
- Todd Eldredge — three-time Olympian and six-time world champion figure skater
- Pat Fallon — member of the Texas House of Representatives
- Marc Fein — journalist and NBC News anchor
- Justin Forsett — Former NFL player
- LaTroy Hawkins — Former MLB player
- Torii Hunter — MLB player, Minnesota Twins and Anaheim Angels
- Ronald Kauffman — Olympic figure skater
- Jaret Reddick — musician
- Lorene Rogers — biochemist; first woman in the United States to lead a public university, the University of Texas
- Ann Ward — winner of the 15th cycle of America's Next Top Model
- Davis Webb — professional football player and coach
