= Prosper High School =

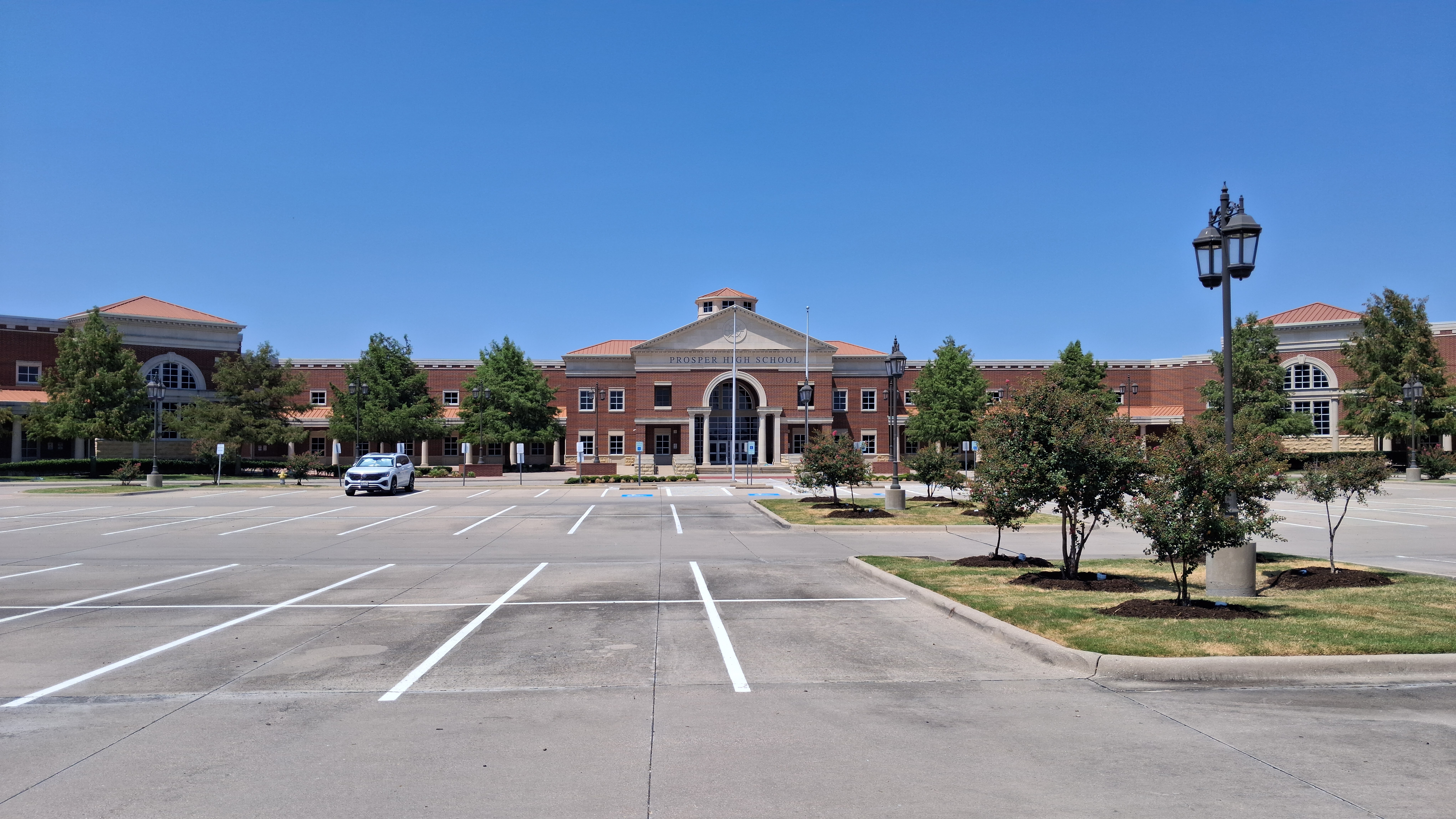
- Prosper High School

Location
- 301 Eagle Drive; Prosper, Texas 75078; United States; 33.2591086°N 96.7986572°W

Information
- Type: Co-educational, public, secondary
- School district: Prosper Independent School District
- NCES School ID: 483600004064
- Principal: Paige Trujillo
- Teaching staff: 208.47 (FTE)
- Grades: 9–12
- Enrollment: 3,449 (2023-2024)
- Student to teacher ratio: 16.54
- Colors: Green and white
- Athletics conference: UIL Class 6A
- Mascot: Eagle
- Website: www.prosper-isd.net/o/phs

Prosper High School is a class 6A public high school in Prosper, Texas, United States. It is part of the Prosper Independent School District in western Collin County, with a small portion of the district extending into Denton County. In addition to Prosper, the school serves a portion of Celina.

== History ==
The 2009–2010 school year began in a brand new building.

In 2015, the school was rated "Met Standard" by the Texas Education Agency.

In September 2015, then-principal Greg Wright created controversy for the school and the Prosper School District, as reported in the Dallas Morning News, when it was revealed that he had criticized a faculty member who reported a teacher from PHS to the police for inappropriately touching a student.

In 2018, two editorials were removed from Prosper High School's student newspaper. The students claimed that they would be censored if they published anything perceived to criticize the school. The Student Press Law Center sent a letter to the Superintendent of Prosper Independent School District, urging them to remediate the school principal's "hijacking and censorship" of the student newspaper.

== Athletics ==
The Prosper Eagles compete in the following sports:

- Baseball
- Basketball
- Cross country
- Football
- Golf
- Powerlifting
- Soccer
- Softball
- Swimming and diving
- Tennis
- Track & field
- Volleyball
- Water polo
- Wrestling

For the 2024–25 and 2025–26 seasons, Prosper High School competes in UIL 6A Region 1 - District 6. The other schools in the district are Allen High School, McKinney High School, McKinney Boyd High School, Plano Senior High School, Plano East Senior High School, Plano West Senior High School, Princeton High School, and Rock Hill High School.

In 2010, Prosper introduced hockey as a club sport.

Prior to the 2006–07 school year, PHS competed in UIL Class 2A. PHS moved up to 3A for Fall 2006. For Fall 2012, PHS was set to become a 4A school for the first time. However, UIL added a new classification for low-enrollment schools, turning Class 4A into Class 5A. With PHS's enrollment of 2110 in October 2015, it was one of the largest schools in Class 5A (schools 1100-2049 students) for the 2016–17 and 2017–18 seasons. PHS moved into Class 6A for the first time in Fall 2018.

=== State titles ===
- Baseball
  - 1984 (1A)
  - 2015 (5A)
- Football
  - 2008 (3A/D1)
- Boys' golf
  - 2011 (3A)
- Girls' soccer
  - 2024(6A)
- Volleyball
  - 2017 (5A)

In the 2017–2018 school year, Prosper High School won the 5A UIL Lone Star Cup, awarded annually based on a school's performance in district and state championships.

Although not recognized by the UIL, Prosper High School competes in lacrosse, in which they won a state title in May 2019.

Prosper also has a band program, the Mighty Eagle Band, and which has won several awards, including several UIL Concert sweepstakes, and have made it to State several times during the Marching season. In both the 2023-2024 season and the 2024-2025 season, the band was 16th and 14th at state preliminary competition respectively, and in the 2025-2026 season were 13th in State Finals competition.

== Notable alumni ==
- Ben Banogu – NFL defensive end
- Jake Majors – college football center for the Texas Longhorns
- Keegan Shoemaker – college football quarterback for the Sam Houston Bearkats
- Davis Webb – NFL quarterbacks coach for the Denver Broncos
- Cade York – NFL placekicker for the Cincinnati Bengals
- Tyler Toney – Co-Founder of Dude Perfect
