= Princeton High School (Texas) =

Princeton Senior High School
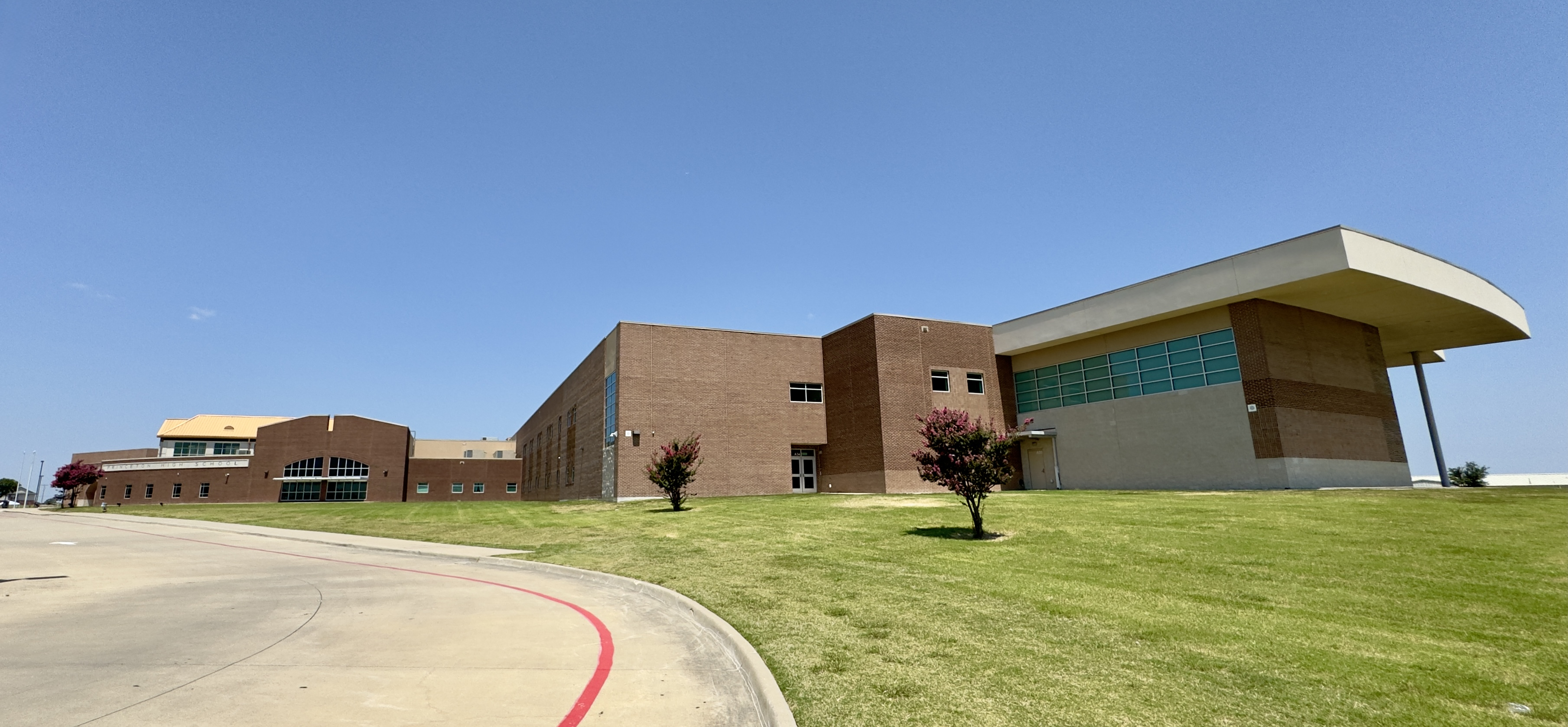

Location
- 1000 East Princeton Drive; Princeton, Collin County, Texas 75407; United States; 33.173551°N 96.489797°W

Information
- School type: Public high school
- School district: Princeton Independent School District
- NCES District ID: 4835850
- NCES School ID: 483585004059
- Principal: Richard Boring
- Teaching staff: 103.27 (on an FTE basis)
- Grades: 11-12
- Enrollment: 1,741 (2023-2024)
- Student to teacher ratio: 16.86
- Colors: Maroon, White
- Fight song: Washington and Lee Swing
- Athletics conference: UIL Class AAAAAA
- Mascot: Panthers/Lady Panthers
- Website: phs.princetonisd.net

Princeton Senior High School is a public high school located in Princeton, Texas (USA). It is part of the Princeton Independent School District located in central Collin County and classified as a 6A school by the UIL. For the 2021-2022 school year, the school received a rating of "B" from the Texas Education Agency. As of the 2021-2022 school year, the high school was separated into a 10-12 high school due to the creation of Lovelady High School, a freshman center. In the 2024-2025 school year, Princeton High School became a senior high school, with Lovelady being an underclassman high school after additional construction.

== Athletics ==
The Princeton Panthers participates in the following sports:

- Baseball
- Basketball
- Cross Country
- Football
- Golf
- Powerlifting
- Soccer
- Softball
- Tennis
- Track & Field
- Volleyball
- Wrestling

=== Football ===
The Princeton football team has made playoff appearances 13 times in 1948, 1972, 1974, 1975, 1976, 2010, 2011, 2012, 2013, 2014, 2015, 2016 and 2017. Princeton won district championships in 1948, 1972, 1974, 1975 and 1976 when only one team per district made the playoffs. In the new format where 4 teams from each district make the playoffs, Princeton has added two more district championships in 2013 and 2017. The winningest coach in Princeton football history is currently Lee Wilkins.

== Basketball ==
PHS men's and women's basketball teams have experienced success over the years. The 1994-95 men's team finished with a record of 30–5, finishing the season as district 9-3A Runner-up and Area Champions after defeating West High School in the playoffs. In the Mid 2000s, Princeton was led by head coach Robert Erger, when they had a stint ranked as the #1 3A boys basketball program in the state of Texas.

== Marching Band ==
The "Panther Pride Marching Band" has made appearances at the UIL State Marching Band Contest on many consecutive occasions, earning the bronze medal three times; once in 2010, again in 2014, and in 2016. The band has been well represented locally and at the state level since the early 1970s.

== Extracurricular activities ==
Princeton High School offers an extensive amount of extracurricular activities and programs, including Speech and Debate, Theatre, UIL Academics, Band, Choir, Winterguard, Art Club, Robotics, Fishing, Journalism, Student Council, Welding, Cheerleading, National Honor Society, Junior Reserve Officers' Training Corps (JROTC), The Fellowship of Christian Athletes, Future Farmers of America (FFA), and Spanish Club. The school also has a widely recognized Career and Technology Exploration (CATE) program that serves Princeton High School students and others from the area's surrounding schools.
