= Chambliss, Texas =

- Unincorporated community
- Location within Texas Location within the United States
- Coordinates: 33°17′41″N 96°29′43″W
- Country: United States
- State: Texas
- County: Collin
- Elevation: 610 ft (190 m)
- Time zone: UTC-6 (Central (CST))
  - Summer (DST): UTC-5 (CDT)
- GNIS feature ID: 1379531

Chambliss is an unincorporated community in Collin County, Texas, United States. According to the Handbook of Texas, the community had a population of 25 in 2000. It is located within the Dallas-Fort Worth Metroplex.

== History ==
Chambliss was named in honor of early settler Charles Chambliss. There was a gin, a church, and two stores here in 1900. A post office was established at Chambliss in 1898 and remained in operation until 1903, after which mail was sent to the community from nearby Anna. It had a population of 25 from 1933 through 2000.

== Geography ==
Chambliss is located on Farm to Market Road 545, 7 mi (11 km) northeast of McKinney and 3 mi (4.8 km) southeast of Anna in northeastern Collin County.

== Education ==
Chambliss had its own school in 1900. Today the community is served by the Melissa Independent School District. It is zoned for North Creek Elementary School, Melissa Middle School, and Melissa High School.
