= Sedalia, Texas =

- Populated place
- Location within the state of Texas Sedalia, Texas (the United States)
- Coordinates: 33°23′46″N 96°28′41″W
- Country: United States
- State: Texas
- Counties: Collin

Area
  - Water: 0.0 sq mi (0 km^{2})
- Elevation: 719 ft (219 m)

Population (2000)
  - Total: 25
- Time zone: UTC-6 (Central (CST))
  - Summer (DST): UTC-5 (CDT)
- ZIP code: 75495
- Area codes: 214, 469, 972
- FIPS code: 48-66560
- GNIS feature ID: 2034686

Sedalia is a populated place in Collin County, Texas, United States. According to the Handbook of Texas, the community had a population of 25 in 2000. It is located within the Dallas-Fort Worth Metroplex.

== History ==
Sedalia was originally named Yakima.

== Geography ==
Sedalia is located near the Grayson County line, 2 mi (3.2 km) northwest of Westminster in far-northeastern Collin County. It used to be on FM 3093 before it was combined with Farm to Market Road 3133.

== Education ==
Today the community is served by the Anna Independent School District. It is zoned for Judith L. Harlow Elementary School, Anna Middle School, and Anna High School.
