= Jambres Dubar =

American football player (born 2004)

No. 1 – Missouri State Bears
- Position: Running back
- Class: Senior

Personal information
- Born: November 8, 2004 (age 21)
- Listed height: 6 ft 0 in (1.83 m)
- Listed weight: 205 lb (93 kg)

Career information
- High school: Anna (Anna, Texas)
- College: Boise State (2023–2025); Missouri State (2026–present)
- Stats at ESPN

Jambres Dubar (born November 8, 2004) is an American college football running back for the Missouri State Bears. He previously played for the Boise State Broncos.

== Early life ==
Dubar attended high school at Anna located in Anna, Texas. Coming out of high school, he was rated as a three star recruit, where he committed to play college football for the Boise State Broncos.

== College career ==
In his first career game in week one of the 2023 season, he rushed for 29 yards on five carries against UCF. During his freshman season in 2023, he rushed for 335 yards and two touchdowns on 62 carries. In week six of the 2024 season, Dubar rushed nine times for 65 yards and a touchdown in a victory over Utah State. He would then suffer an injury causing him to miss the next three games, where he returned in week eleven, rushing twice for seven yards in a victory against Nevada. Dubar finished the 2024 season, totaling 25 carries for 99 yards and two touchdowns.
