= Yakima (disambiguation) =

Yakima, Washington is a city in the United States.

Yakima may also refer to:

- The Yakama, a Native American people, spelled Yakima until 1994
  - The Yakama Indian Reservation, formerly Yakima Indian Reservation
- Yakima Canutt (1896-1986), American actor and stuntman
- Yakima County, Washington, a county in Washington state
- Yakima River, a river flowing through Yakima
- Sedalia, Texas, formerly known as Yakima
- MV Yakima, a ferry based in Washington state
