= Chambliss =

Chambliss is a surname. Notable people with the surname include:

- Chaz Chambliss (born 2002), American football player
- Chris Chambliss (born 1948), American baseball player
- Clyde Chambliss (born 1969), American politician
- John R. Chambliss (1833–1864), American soldier
- John R. Chambliss Sr. (1809–1875), American politician
- Kirby Chambliss (born 1959), American flier
- Robert Edward Chambliss (1904–1985), American domestic terrorist
- Saxby Chambliss (born 1948), American politician, Senior Senator from Georgia
- Trinidad Chambliss (born 2002), American football player
- William Chambliss (1933–2014), American criminologist, sociologist, and teacher
- William V. Chambliss (1866–1928), American businessperson, planter, and teacher

== Other uses ==
- Chambliss, Texas, an unincorporated community
