= Brendon Lewis =

American football player (born 2001)

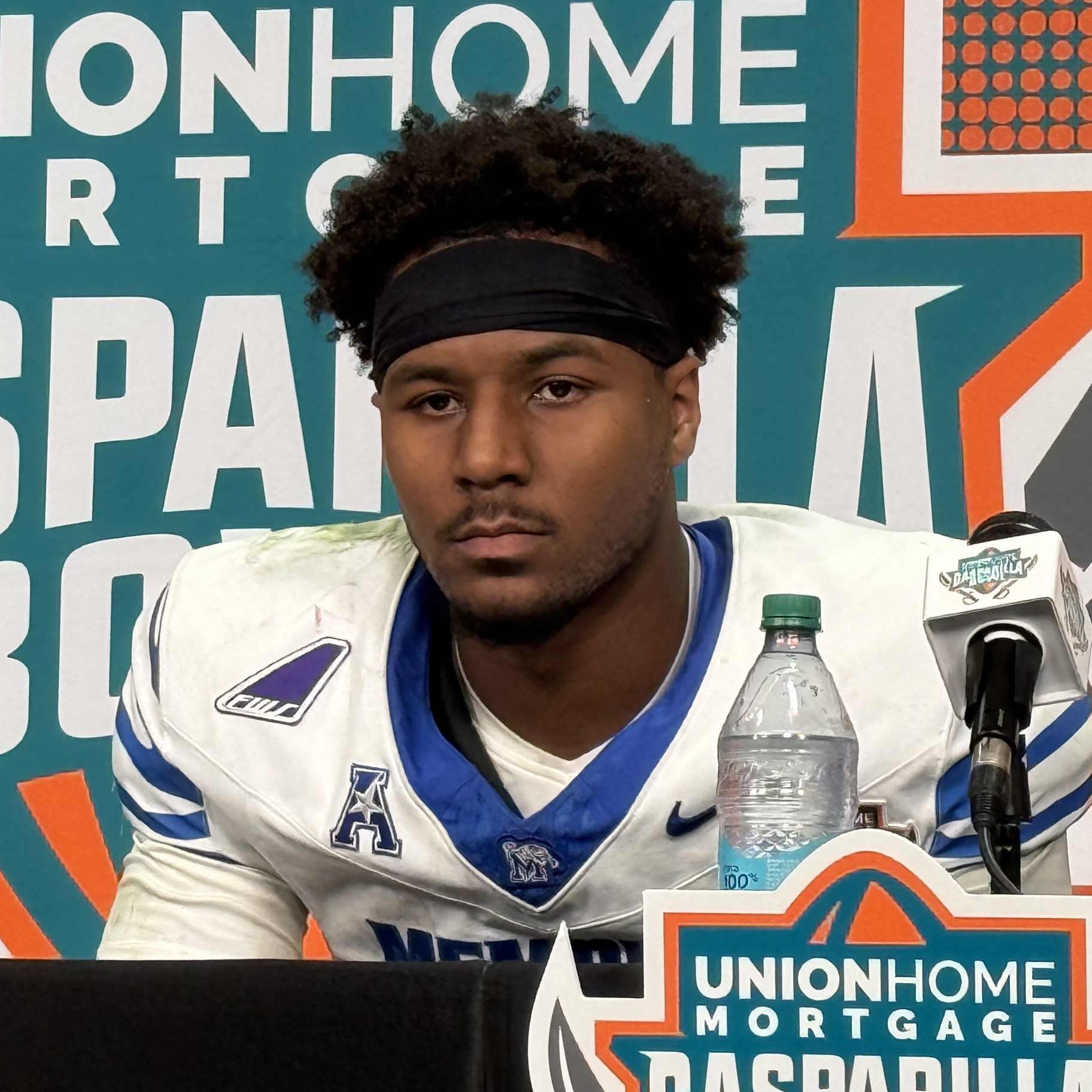
- Lewis after the 2025 Gasparilla Bowl

Profile
- Position: Quarterback

Personal information
- Born: December 8, 2001 (age 24); Dallas, Texas, U.S.
- Listed height: 6 ft 2 in (1.88 m)
- Listed weight: 216 lb (98 kg)

Career information
- High school: Melissa (Melissa, Texas)
- College: Colorado (2020–2022); Nevada (2023–2024); Memphis (2025)
- NFL draft: 2026: undrafted
- Stats at ESPN

Brendon Lewis (born December 8, 2001) is an American football quarterback. He played college football for the Colorado Buffaloes, Nevada Wolf Pack, and Memphis Tigers.

== Early life ==
Lewis grew up in Melissa, Texas and attended Melissa High School. He was a four-star recruit by ESPN and was rated a three-star recruit by Rivals and 247Sports and he committed to play college football at Colorado over numerous Power 4 offers.

== College career ==
=== Colorado ===
During his true freshman season in 2020, Lewis played in only one game being the 2020 Alamo Bowl where he completed 6 out of 10 passes for 95 yards, nine rushes for 73 yards and a touchdown. During the 2021 season, he started all 12 games as a quarterback making him the second freshman quarterback to start a season opener at Colorado. He finished the season with completing 149 out of 257 passing attempts for 1,540 yards, 10 touchdowns with three interceptions. During the 2022 season, Lewis only played in two games and finished the season with 15 out of 24 passing attempts for 92 yards. On October 18, 2022, Lewis announced that he would be entering the transfer portal and will not finish the rest of the season. On December 26, 2022, he announced that he would transfer to Nevada.

=== Nevada ===
During the 2023 season, Lewis was named as Nevada's starting quarterback.

In week seven of the 2024 season, Lewis led the Wolf Pack in passing, rushing and receiving yards in a victory over Oregon State. Lewis ran for a career-high 151 yards to go along with his 51 passing and 18 receiving yards.

=== Memphis ===
On December 20, 2024, Lewis transferred to the Memphis Tigers.

=== Statistics ===
Season	Team	Games			Passing								Rushing			
Season	Team	GP	GS	Record	Cmp	Att	Pct	Yds	Y/A	TD	Int	Rtg	Att	Yds	Avg	TD
2020	Colorado	1	0	—	6	10	60.0	95	9.5	0	0	139.8	9	73	8.1	1
2021	Colorado	12	12	4–8	149	257	58.0	1,540	6.0	10	3	118.8	98	188	1.9	2
2022	Colorado	2	1	0–1	15	24	62.2	92	3.8	0	0	94.7	12	43	3.6	0
2023	Nevada	12	10	2–8	131	236	55.5	1,313	5.6	2	6	100.0	120	495	4.1	4
2024	Nevada	12	12	3–9	211	312	67.6	2,290	7.3	16	7	141.7	157	775	4.9	8
2025	Memphis	13	13	8–5	253	368	68.8	2,673	7.3	16	7	140.3	151	665	4.4	9
Career		52	48	17–31	765	1,207	63.4	8,003	6.6	44	23	127.3	547	2,239	4.1	24

== Professional career ==
Pre-draft measurables
Height	Weight	Arm length	Hand span	Wingspan	40-yard dash	10-yard split	20-yard split	20-yard shuttle	Three-cone drill	Vertical jump	Broad jump
6 ft 2 1/4 in (1.89 m)	216 lb (98 kg)	33 3/8 in (0.85 m)	11 in (0.28 m)	6 ft 7 3/8 in (2.02 m)	4.74 s	1.59 s	2.68 s	4.40 s	7.27 s	32.0 in (0.81 m)	9 ft 11 in (3.02 m)
All values from Pro Day

In May 2026, he attended rookie minicamp with the Carolina Panthers.

== Personal life ==
Lewis is the nephew of former NFL linebacker and current film director, producer, and screenwriter, Jon Alston.
