= Westminster, Texas =

Census-designated place in Collin County, Texas, United States

- Census-designated place
- Location of Westminster in Collin County, Texas
- Coordinates: 33°22′12″N 96°27′35″W
- Country: United States
- State: Texas
- County: Collin

Area
  - Total: 3.99 sq mi (10.34 km^{2})
  - Land: 3.98 sq mi (10.32 km^{2})
  - Water: 0.0077 sq mi (0.02 km^{2})
- Elevation: 699 ft (213 m)

Population (2020)
  - Total: 1,035
  - Density: 216/sq mi (83.4/km^{2})
- Time zone: UTC-6 (Central (CST))
  - Summer (DST): UTC-5 (CDT)
- ZIP code: 75485
- Area code: 972
- FIPS code: 48-77680
- GNIS feature ID: 2587003

Westminster (/wɛstˈmɪnstər/) is a former city and current census-designated place (CDP) in northeastern Collin County, Texas, United States. As of the 2020 census, Westminster had a population of 1,035.

Westminster is located at the intersection of FM 3133 and FM 2862, northeast of McKinney, east of Anna, west of Leonard, north of Blue Ridge, and southeast of Van Alstyne.

== History ==
The city was first settled in 1860, and named "Seven Points". It grew quickly, and by 1885 had absorbed the neighbouring communities of Prospect and Graybill. In 1888, a private school was established; the building was later sold to the Methodist Church, establishing Westminster College. The college, a preparatory school for prospective ministers, was named after Westminster, Maryland, a Methodist stronghold in an otherwise predominantly Catholic state.

Within a year, the residents of Seven Points decided to change the name of their community to Westminster. The town received a post office branch in 1899, and Westminster was incorporated after a vote of 38 to 19 against, on June 17, 1916. Around the same time, the Greenville and Whitewright Northern Traction Company built a railway line from Anna to Blue Ridge that passed through Westminster.

Economic and population growth followed afterward, and from the turn of the 20th century into the 1920s, Westminster served as a cotton market and trade center for local farmers. The population grew to a high of 600, with several businesses and a high school In 1920, however, the railroad line was abandoned, and other railroads bypassed the town.

During the Great Depression, the population of Westminster was reduced by over half (to 268), and the town never had the renewed growth of its larger neighbors (such as Van Alstyne, Anna or Melissa); most of the town's businesses had closed by World War II.

The population continued to decline until the early 1970s, when it slowly began to recover. By 1990, Westminster's population was 388.

Westminster received a volunteer fire department in the 1990s. Fire department establishment started by lifelong resident Sam Geer. S.Geer seen a need in the small town for need in fire department response. Geer was the fire chief since the beginning until 2013 when he was made an Honorary Chief.

During the night of May 9, 2006, at around 10:30 P.M., an F3 tornado swept through the small community of Westminster, leveling many homes, damaging several others, and killing 3. Several others were injured and taken to local hospitals, while the American Red Cross set up shelter at Anna High School in nearby Anna. Sirens sounded in Anna, but due to the small population, sirens are not installed in Westminster, giving no warning to its residents. The storm struck very quickly, allowing little time to prepare.

Westminster High School was one of the last (if not the last) Texas school to field an eight-man football team. During the 1983 season, they beat a Dallas area team 90–0.

== Recent decline and disincorporation ==
Westminster began a noticeable decline after 1988, when the Texas Board of Education, citing various deficiencies, removed the accreditation from the Westminster Independent School District. In 1989, voters abolished the district and closed its school. Most of the students in Westminster now attend school in Anna.

With marginal sales tax revenues, and a weak property tax base, Westminster was unable to recover from various mismanagement; embezzlement of state grant money and poor record-keeping led to a massive debt that, since 1997, had left the city seeking bankruptcy. This debt, of unpaid traffic fine revenues and a misappropriated (and unused) sewer grant, totalled over $300,000 USD.

Twice, the city of Westminster sought to declare for bankruptcy; the first effort, in 2001, failed after creditors rejected a payout plan. In early 2004, the state agencies agreed to relinquish their claims, provided that Westminster disincorporate.

Since then, the issue had been a debated topic in Westminster. That summer, the city council started a petition drive to gather enough signatures to place the matter of disincorporation on the ballot for the May 2005 elections. The council then proceeded to fire the city administrator, who opposed disincorporation. Those in favor of the matter, including then-mayor Phil Goplin, stated that disincorporation would keep the city from stagnating; without any cashflow or a sewer system, it is unable to attract the development of its neighboring municipalities.

The residents of Westminster voted to abolish their town charter on May 7, 2005. The disincorporation of the city of Westminster was only the eleventh such occurrence in Texas since 1975. With the loss of its charter, the city retains its name as a community, but is officially an unincorporated part of Collin County. Therefore, maintenance and other services of the former city are now the responsibility of Collin County. Through an agreement with the city's creditors, the debts are considered void.

Had Westminster remained incorporated after the election, the city's sales tax receipts would have been withheld until half the debt was repaid. A former city mayor was running for election, in case the vote failed. Opponents of the decision worry now of the loss of Westminster's history, as well as possible annexation from neighboring Anna.

== Geography ==
Westminster is located in northeastern Collin County.

According to the United States Census Bureau, in 2000 the city had a total area of 1.8 square miles (4.7 km^{2}), of which 1.8 square miles (4.7 km^{2}) was land and 0.55% was water. In 2010, the Westminster CDP had a total area of 4.0 square miles (10.3 km^{2}), of which 0.01 square miles (0.02 km^{2}), or 0.17%, was water.

== Demographics ==
Historical population
Census	Pop.	Note	%±
1920	631		—
1930	268		−57.5%
1940	290		8.2%
1950	192		−33.8%
1960	194		1.0%
1970	257		32.5%
1980	278		8.2%
1990	388		39.6%
2000	390		0.5%
2010	861		120.8%
2020	1,035		20.2%
U.S. Decennial Census; 1850–1900 1910; 1920 1930 1940; 1950 1960 1970; 1980 1990 2000; 2010 2020

Westminster first appeared as a town in the 1920 U.S. census; and after disincorporation was listed as a census designated place in the 2010 U.S. census.

Westminster CDP, Texas – Racial and ethnic composition Note: the US Census treats Hispanic/Latino as an ethnic category. This table excludes Latinos from the racial categories and assigns them to a separate category. Hispanics/Latinos may be of any race.
Race / Ethnicity (NH = Non-Hispanic)	Pop 2000	Pop 2010	Pop 2020	% 2000	% 2010	% 2020
White alone (NH)	364	677	637	93.33%	78.63%	61.55%
Black or African American alone (NH)	1	3	8	0.26%	0.35%	0.77%
Native American or Alaska Native alone (NH)	1	5	2	0.26%	0.58%	0.19%
Asian alone (NH)	1	0	7	0.26%	0.00%	0.68%
Native Hawaiian or Pacific Islander alone (NH)	0	0	0	0.00%	0.00%	0.00%
Other race alone (NH)	0	0	1	0.00%	0.00%	0.10%
Mixed race or Multiracial (NH)	0	9	65	0.00%	1.05%	6.28%
Hispanic or Latino (any race)	23	167	315	5.90%	19.40%	30.43%
Total	390	861	1,035	100.00%	100.00%	100.00%

As of the census of 2000, there were 390 people, 140 households, and 112 families residing in the city. The population density was 214.7 inhabitants per square mile (82.9/km^{2}). There were 161 housing units at an average density of 88.6 per square mile (34.2/km^{2}). The racial makeup of the city was 97.18% White, 0.26% African American, 0.26% Native American, 0.26% Asian, 2.05% from other races. Hispanic or Latino of any race were 5.90% of the population.

There were 140 households, out of which 32.1% had children under the age of 18 living with them, 62.9% were married couples living together, 11.4% had a female householder with no husband present, and 20.0% were non-families. 17.1% of all households were made up of individuals, and 4.3% had someone living alone who was 65 years of age or older. The average household size was 2.79 and the average family size was 3.13.

In the city the population was spread out, with 27.7% under the age of 18, 7.9% from 18 to 24, 31.5% from 25 to 44, 25.9% from 45 to 64, and 6.9% who were 65 years of age or older. The median age was 35 years. For every 100 females, there were 97.0 males. For every 100 females age 18 and over, there were 104.3 males.

The median income for a household in the city was $42,083, and the median income for a family was $45,000. Males had a median income of $30,938 versus $24,063 for females. The per capita income for the city was $17,248. About 5.9% of families and 10.4% of the population were below the poverty line, including 18.8% of those under age 18 and none of those age 65 or over.

== Education ==
Residents are part of the Anna Independent School District. The former Westminster Independent School District merged into the Anna district on July 1, 1989.

== Motorcycle mecca ==
Westminster regained recognition in 2007 after a bar, now named The Gar Hole, began attracting regular crowds of motorcycle riders. Additional businesses catering to the regular weekend influx of riders have also been established.

== See also ==
- List of census-designated places in Texas
