= McKinney, Texas =

City in Texas, United States

- City
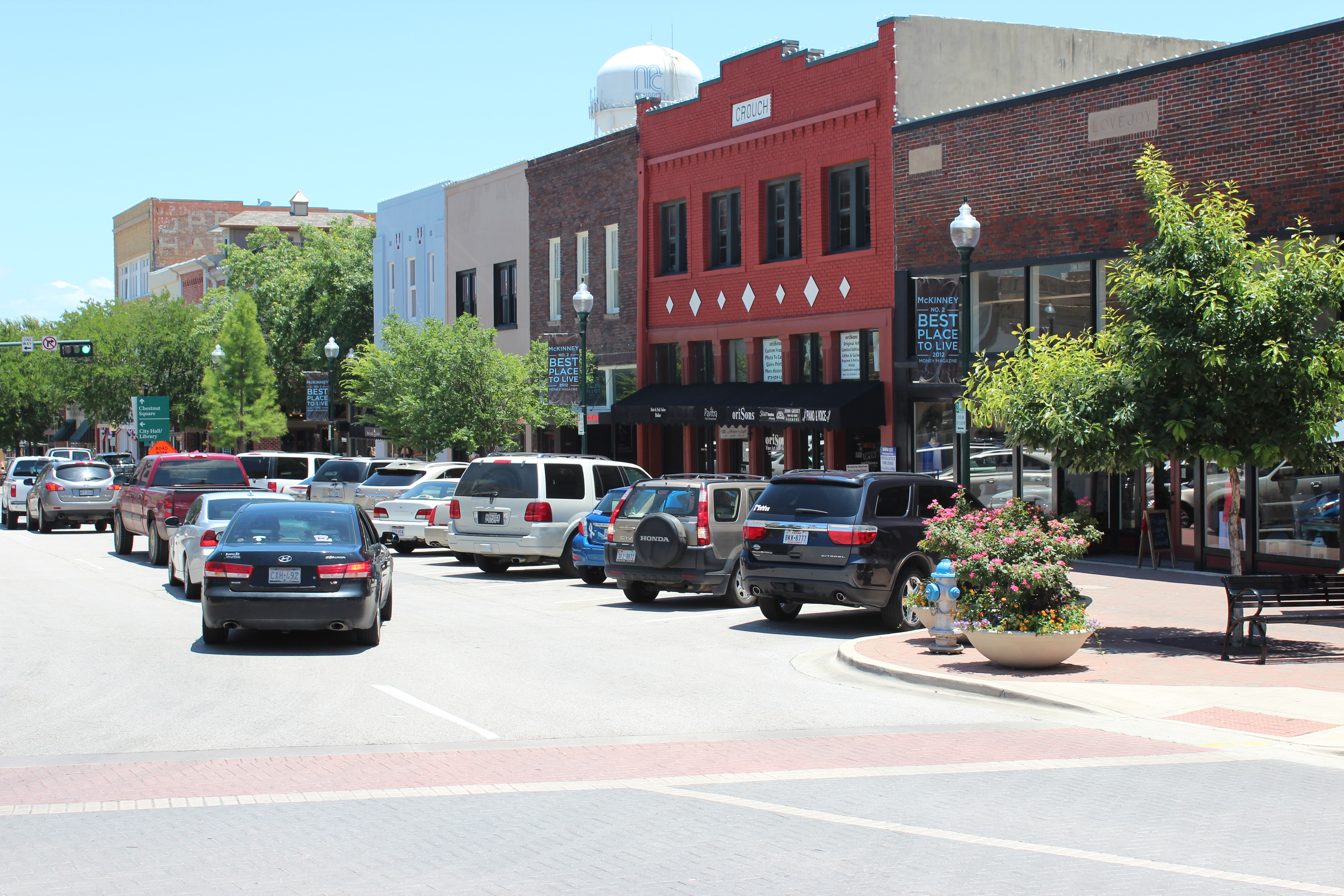
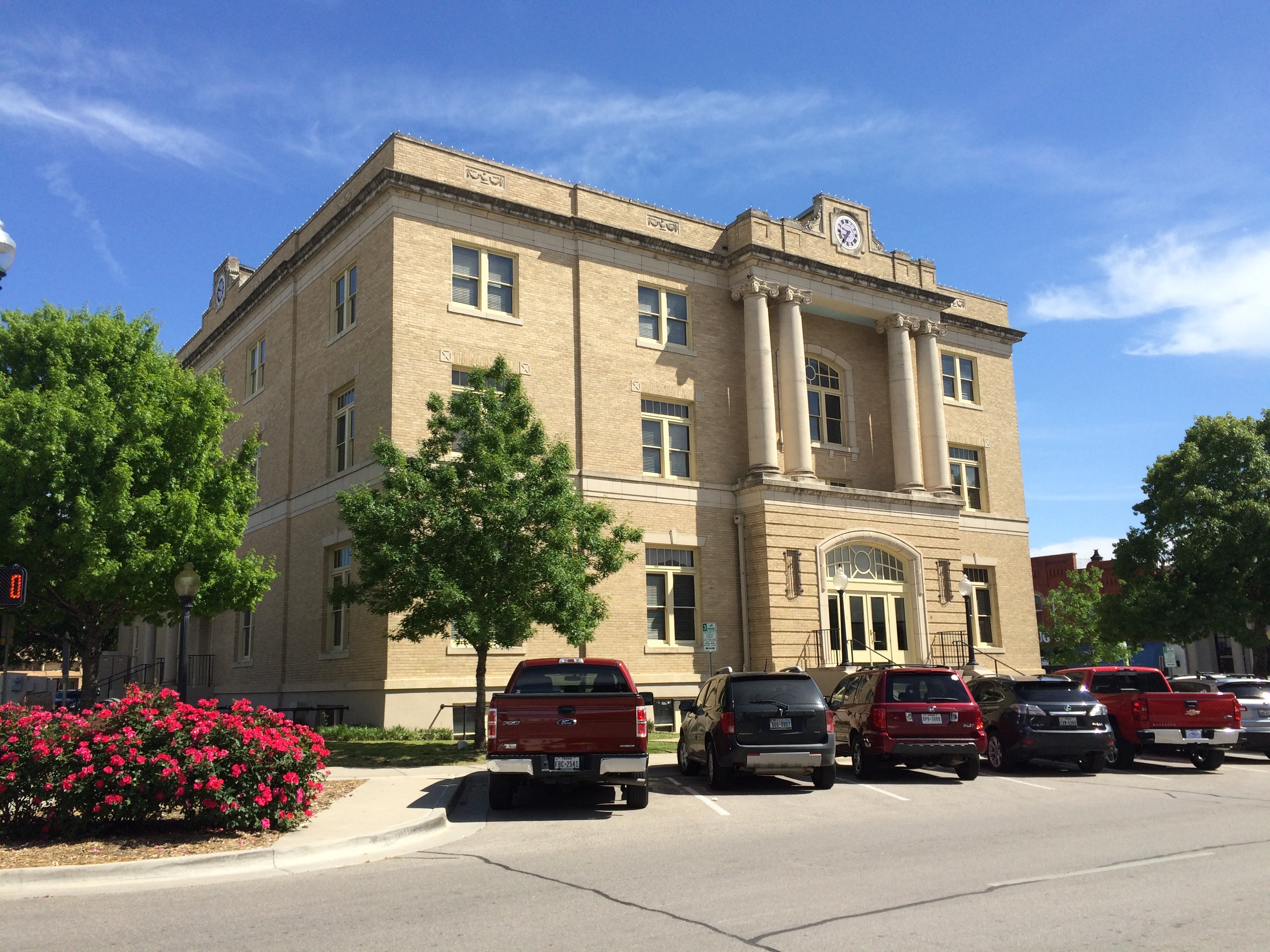
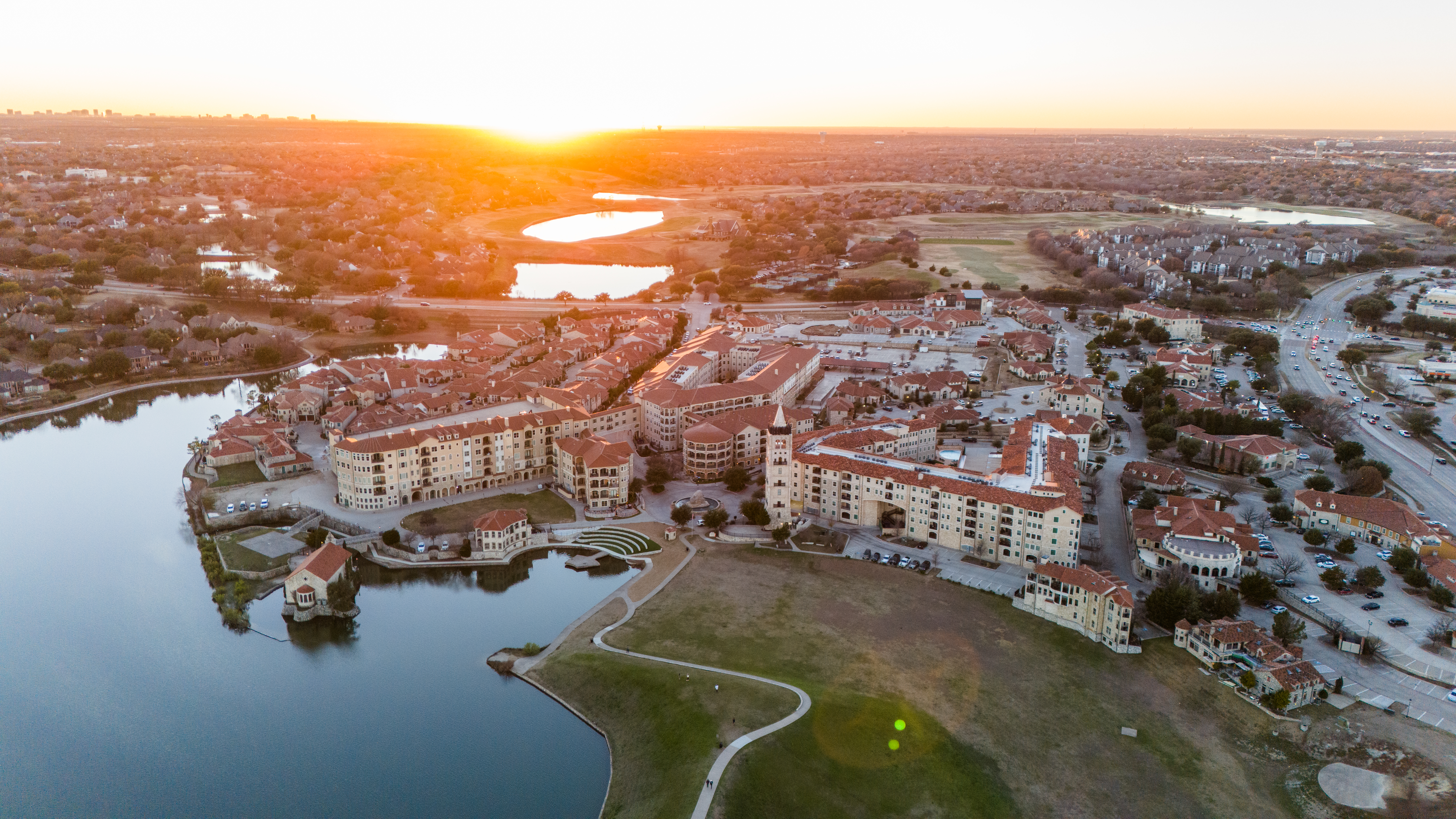
- Downtown McKinney Old Collin County Courthouse Adriatica Village

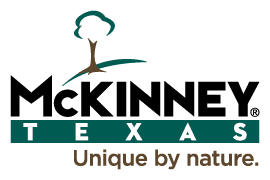
- Logo
- Motto: "Unique by nature"
- Interactive map of McKinney, Texas
- Location within Texas Location within the United States
- Coordinates: 33°11′50″N 96°38′23″W
- Country: United States
- State: Texas
- County: Collin
- Incorporated: 1848
- Named for: Collin McKinney

Government
  - Type: Council-Manager
  - Mayor: Bill Cox

Area
  - City: 67.70 sq mi (175.35 km^{2})
  - Land: 66.96 sq mi (173.43 km^{2})
  - Water: 0.74 sq mi (1.91 km^{2})
- Elevation: 577 ft (176 m)

Population (2020)
  - City: 195,308
  - Estimate (2025): 236,001 ▲
  - Density: 2,916.7/sq mi (1,126.15/km^{2})
  - Urban: 504,803 (McKinney-Frisco) (US: 83rd)
  - Urban density: 3,329/sq mi (1,285.3/km^{2})
- Time zone: UTC−6 (CST)
  - Summer (DST): UTC−5 (CDT)
- ZIP codes: 75069-75072
- Area codes: 214, 469, 945, 972
- FIPS code: 48-45744
- GNIS feature ID: 2411064
- Website: www.mckinneytexas.org

McKinney is a city in and the county seat of Collin County, Texas, United States. It is Collin County's third-largest city, after Plano and Frisco. A suburb of the Dallas–Fort Worth metroplex, McKinney is about 32 miles (51 km) north of Dallas.

The Census Bureau ranked McKinney as the nation's fourth fastest-growing large city from 2010 to 2019 and determined the city's 2020 population was 195,308. Based on Census Bureau estimates, as of July 2022 the city's population was 207,507, making it Texas's 15th-most populous city and the 99th most populous in the United States.

The Census Bureau defines an urban area of northern Dallas-area suburbs that are separated from the Dallas–Fort Worth urban area, with McKinney and Frisco as the principal cities; the McKinney–Frisco urban area had a population of 504,803 as of the 2020 census, ranked 83rd in the United States.

== History ==
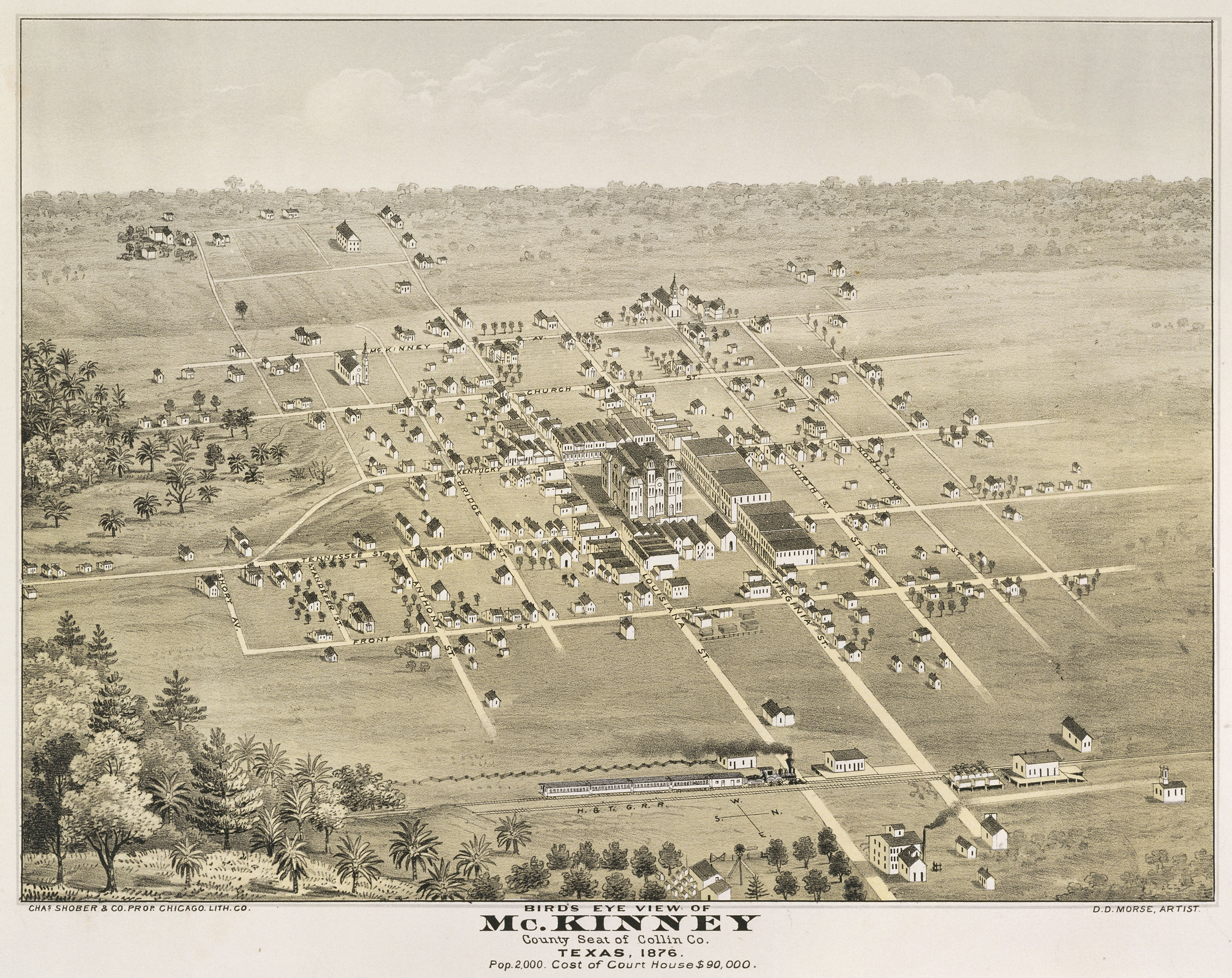
Map from 1876

In 1848, McKinney was named the county seat of Collin County due to the original county seat of Buckner not being within three miles of the county's geographic center. On March 24, 1849, William Davis, who owned 3,000 acres (12 km^{2}) where McKinney now stands, donated 120 acres (0.49 km^{2}) for the townsite. That same year, McKinney would be incorporated and in 1859 McKinney was incorporated again. In 1913, the McKinney adopted the commission form of government.

Before the arrival of the railroad in 1872, McKinney saw little growth. After the arrival of the Houston and Texas Central Railroad however, McKinney became the primary commercial center of Collin County and stimulated massive growth in the city. Over the next 50 years, McKinney would become an agricultural powerhouse with its production of corn, wheat, and oats, placing Collin County among the top producers in Texas. Cotton also contributed heavily to the economy of Collin County with three new cotton gin being built between 1870 and 1876 increasing the amount of cotton gins in McKinney to 4.

With newfound prosperity coming from the railroad, McKinney started to build more infrastructure. Construction on the Old Collin County Courthouse begun in 1874 and in 1883, McKinney saw the establishment of the Collin County National Bank as well as the establishment of a telephone exchange. In 1889, the city installed electric lights.

By 1970, Plano had surpassed McKinney in population size. Throughout the late 20th century, McKinney experienced steady growth, increasing from 15,193 residents in 1970 to 21,283 by 1990. By the mid-1980s, the town had evolved into a suburban commuter community for individuals working in Plano and Dallas. In 1985, McKinney had a population of just over 16,000 and supported 254 businesses. Since then, the city's growth rate has accelerated significantly. In the 2000 census, McKinney had grown to 54,369 with 2,005 businesses and in the 2010 census the population had more than doubled to 131,117 residents. The Census Bureau's July 2015 estimate placed the population of McKinney at 162,898. A later estimate placed the city population as of January 1, 2019 as 187,802.

Both the city and the county were named for Collin McKinney, signer of the Texas Declaration of Independence, and a congressman for the Red River district of the former Republic of Texas. He was the author of a bill establishing counties in the northern part of the state.

== Geography ==
According to the United States Census Bureau, the city has an area of 62.9 square miles (162.9 km^{2}), of which 0.7 square mile (1.7 km^{2}), or 1.07%, is covered by water.

=== Climate ===
McKinney is considered part of the humid subtropical region.

- On average, the warmest month is July.
- The highest recorded temperature was 118 °F (48 °C) in 1936.
- On average, the coolest month is January.
- The lowest recorded temperature was −7 °F (−22 °C) in 1930.
- The maximum average precipitation occurs in May.

It is also part of the Texas blackland prairies, part of the Sun Belt, which has hot, dry summers. Humidity makes temperatures feel higher, and winters are mild and are usually rainy; snowstorms occasionally occur. Spring is the wettest part of the year, which brings winds from the Gulf Coast.

Climate data for McKinney, Texas
Month	Jan	Feb	Mar	Apr	May	Jun	Jul	Aug	Sep	Oct	Nov	Dec	Year
Record high °F (°C)	87 (31)	95 (35)	97 (36)	100 (38)	105 (41)	108 (42)	112 (44)	118 (48)	110 (43)	99 (37)	93 (34)	89 (32)	118 (48)
Mean daily maximum °F (°C)	52.5 (11.4)	58.1 (14.5)	65.6 (18.7)	73.3 (22.9)	80.2 (26.8)	87.7 (30.9)	92.7 (33.7)	92.6 (33.7)	85.4 (29.7)	75.7 (24.3)	63.2 (17.3)	54.8 (12.7)	73.5 (23.1)
Mean daily minimum °F (°C)	31.1 (−0.5)	34.9 (1.6)	42.2 (5.7)	51.2 (10.7)	60.8 (16.0)	68.5 (20.3)	72.0 (22.2)	70.6 (21.4)	64.2 (17.9)	53.0 (11.7)	42.4 (5.8)	34.1 (1.2)	52.1 (11.2)
Record low °F (°C)	−7 (−22)	−5 (−21)	7 (−14)	25 (−4)	27 (−3)	44 (7)	50 (10)	53 (12)	39 (4)	15 (−9)	11 (−12)	−4 (−20)	−7 (−22)
Average precipitation inches (mm)	2.43 (62)	2.91 (74)	3.37 (86)	3.65 (93)	5.68 (144)	4.11 (104)	2.36 (60)	2.16 (55)	3.15 (80)	4.24 (108)	3.71 (94)	3.24 (82)	41.01 (1,042)
Average snowfall inches (cm)	.8 (2.0)	1.0 (2.5)	.1 (0.25)	0 (0)	0 (0)	0 (0)	0 (0)	0 (0)	0 (0)	0 (0)	.2 (0.51)	.2 (0.51)	2.3 (5.77)
Average precipitation days (≥ 0.01 in)	7.3	6.3	7.6	7.1	8.9	7.0	4.5	4.1	5.9	6.3	6.6	6.6	78.2
Average snowy days (≥ 0.1 in)	.8	1.0	.1	0	0	0	0	0	0	0	.1	.2	2.2
Source 1: NOAA
Source 2: The Weather Channel

== Demographics ==
Historical population
Census	Pop.	Note	%±
1850	315		—
1870	503		—
1880	1,479		194.0%
1890	2,489		68.3%
1900	4,342		74.4%
1910	4,714		8.6%
1920	6,677		41.6%
1930	7,307		9.4%
1940	8,555		17.1%
1950	10,560		23.4%
1960	13,763		30.3%
1970	15,193		10.4%
1980	16,249		7.0%
1990	21,283		31.0%
2000	54,369		155.5%
2010	131,117		141.2%
2020	195,308		49.0%
2025 (est.)	236,001	▲	20.8%

=== Racial and ethnic composition ===
McKinney city, Texas – Racial and ethnic composition Note: the US Census treats Hispanic/Latino as an ethnic category. This table excludes Latinos from the racial categories and assigns them to a separate category. Hispanics/Latinos may be of any race.
Race / Ethnicity (NH = Non-Hispanic)	Pop 2000	Pop 2010	Pop 2020	% 2000	% 2010	% 2020
White alone (NH)	38,854	84,547	102,549	71.46%	64.48%	52.51%
Black or African American alone (NH)	3,876	13,416	24,769	7.13%	10.23%	12.68%
Native American or Alaska Native alone (NH)	237	604	713	0.44%	0.46%	0.37%
Asian alone (NH)	789	5,244	23,891	1.45%	4.00%	12.23%
Pacific Islander alone (NH)	20	81	157	0.04%	0.06%	0.08%
Some Other Race alone (NH)	83	188	852	0.15%	0.14%	0.44%
Mixed race or Multiracial (NH)	634	2,631	8,985	1.17%	2.01%	4.60%
Hispanic or Latino (any race)	9,876	24,406	33,392	18.16%	18.61%	17.10%
Total	54,369	131,117	195,308	100.00%	100.00%	100.00%

=== 2020 census ===
As of the 2020 census, McKinney had a population of 195,308, representing continued growth from the city's 131,117 residents in 2010 and 54,369 in 2000. The median age was 35.6 years, 28.0% of residents were under the age of 18, and 10.4% were 65 years of age or older. For every 100 females there were 94.2 males, and for every 100 females age 18 and over there were 91.0 males age 18 and over.

99.6% of residents lived in urban areas, while 0.4% lived in rural areas.

There were 68,366 households in McKinney, of which 43.2% had children under the age of 18 living in them. Of all households, 58.8% were married-couple households, 13.3% were households with a male householder and no spouse or partner present, and 23.2% were households with a female householder and no spouse or partner present. About 20.2% of all households were made up of individuals and 6.0% had someone living alone who was 65 years of age or older.

There were 72,876 housing units, of which 6.2% were vacant. The homeowner vacancy rate was 1.6% and the rental vacancy rate was 9.2%.

Racial composition as of the 2020 census
Race	Number	Percent
White	109,815	56.2%
Black or African American	25,355	13.0%
American Indian and Alaska Native	1,367	0.7%
Asian	24,053	12.3%
Native Hawaiian and Other Pacific Islander	170	0.1%
Some other race	10,943	5.6%
Two or more races	23,605	12.1%
Hispanic or Latino (of any race)	33,392	17.1%

=== American Community Survey ===
Of the 68,458 households at the 2019 American Community Survey, 59.8% were married-couples living together. The average household size was 2.88 and the average family size was 3.36.

In 2019, the median income in the city increased to $89,828; the mean income was $111,588.

=== 2010 census ===
In 2010, there were 28,186 households; 45.1% had children under the age of 18 living with them, 63.6% were married couples living together, 9.5% had a female householder with no husband present, and 23.2% were not families; 19.0% of all households were made up of individuals, and 5.3% had someone living alone who was 65 years of age or older. The average household size was 2.89 and the average family size was 3.29.

In 2010, the median income for a household in the city was $63,366, and for a family was $72,133. Males had a median income of $50,663 versus $32,074 for females. The per capita income for the city was $28,185. About 4.9% of families and 8.5% of the population were below the poverty line, including 9.2% of those under age 18 and 7.9% of those age 65 or over.

=== 2000 census ===
As of the 2000 U.S. census, 64% of the foreign-born residents of McKinney originated from Mexico.

=== Migration and growth ===
Since 2009, 70% of McKinney's total population born outside of the United States had arrived in the U.S. in the 1990s.

In May 2017, the U.S. Census Bureau reported that McKinney was the third fastest-growing city in the United States. It had a 5.9% growth rate between 2015 and 2016.

== Economy ==
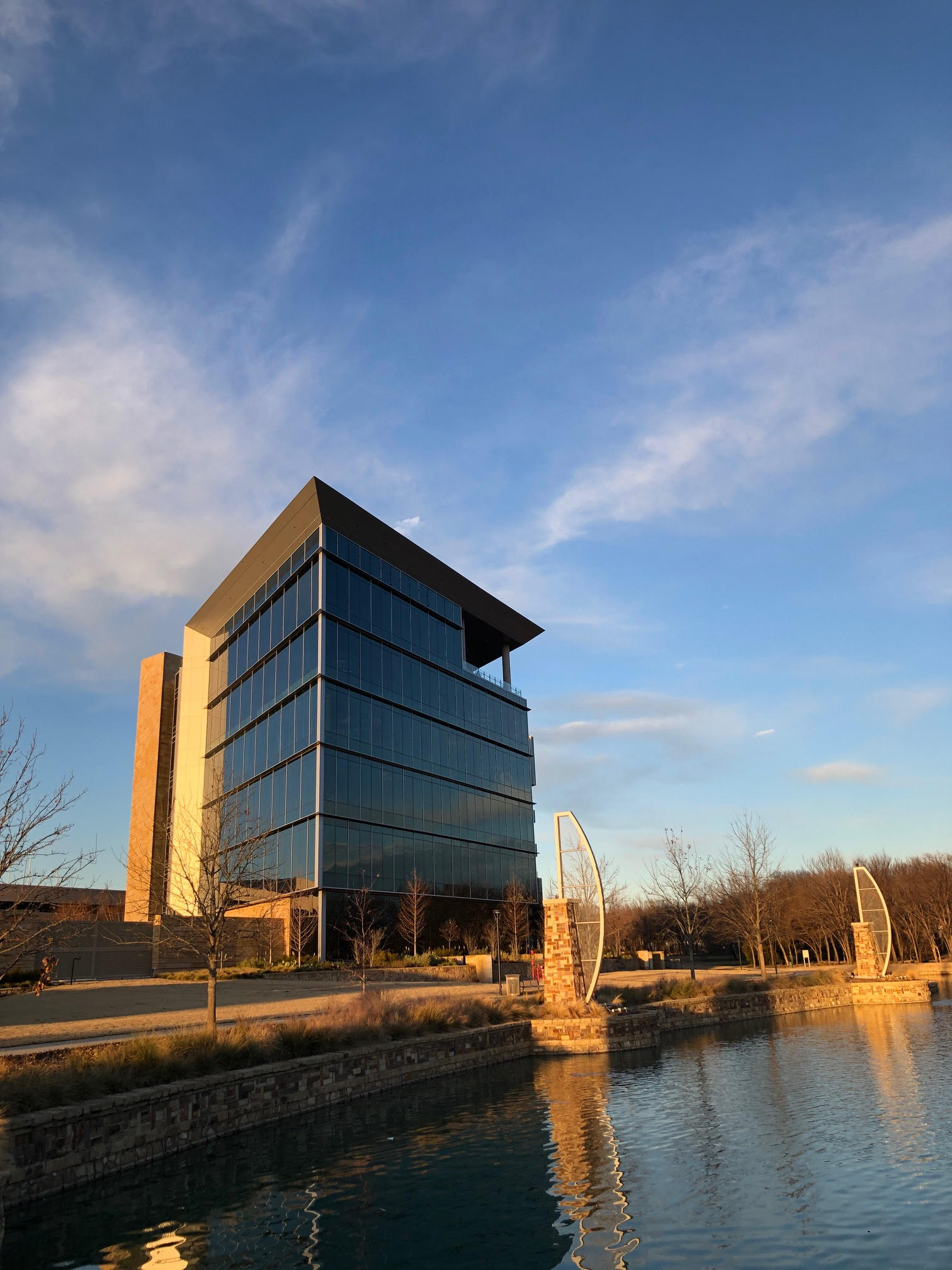
Independent Financial Building in 2019 on Henneman Way

At its beginning, McKinney heavily relied on agriculture. Unlike most of the American South, McKinney relied on the production of corn and wheat instead of cotton. This was due to the lack of railroads and generally poor infrastructure in Collin County before the 1870s. After the railroads arrived in McKinney in 1872, McKinney would experience major growth in the cotton industry with the city becoming a major distribution point for cotton farmers in Collin County. Collin County itself would become the sixth largest cotton producer in the country by 1926. In 1870, there was only 1 cotton gin in McKinney but by 1876 there were 4 cotton gins in McKinney. The first textile mill in McKinney, the Texas Cotton Mill Company, opened a mill in McKinney in 1910. After World War II, McKinney would start transitioning from its agricultural based economy to one based on industry and manufacturing.

The per capita personal income per person has been consistently rising since at least the mid-2010s with per capita personal income rising from $32,849 in 2014 to $46,671 in 2023. The median household income also experienced a similar trend going from $81,118 in 2014 to $98,317 in 2023. As of the 2023 fiscal year, the unemployment rate in McKinney is 3.7%.

According to the city's 2024 Comprehensive Annual Financial Report, the top 10 employers in the city are:

#	Employer	# of Employees
1	Raytheon Intelligence & Space	4,200
2	McKinney Independent School District	2,920
3	Collin County	2,000
4	Globe Life	1,700
5	Encore Wire Corporation	1,653
6	City of McKinney	1,565
7	Medical City McKinney Hospital	1,424
8	Baylor Scott & White McKinney Hospital	1,171
9	Collin College	794
10	Simpson Strong-Tie	650

== Culture ==
=== Events ===
The city hosts several large events throughout the year, many of which cover several blocks of historic downtown, to include:

- Krewe of Barkus - a pre-Mardi Gras festival held downtown focused on dogs with a parade, costumes, awards, and vendor booths.
- Arts in Bloom - a downtown-wide arts festival, with local and visiting artists, as well as local wineries and food vendors, usually held the second weekend in April.
- Texas Music Revolution - in June the entire downtown area shuts down for two days for concerts from over 90 country performers on 20 different stages across the area, along with food and drinks.
- Red White and Boom Parade & Fireworks Festival - a 4 July parade is held downtown in the morning and a large fireworks display and festival usually takes place in western McKinney.
- Oktoberfest - in late September a large German-themed festival takes place for several days on the downtown square with authentic German food, beer, live music, games, and vendors.
- Home for the Holidays - the weekend after Thanksgiving the downtown area shuts down for Santa with Christmas attractions, a large tree lighting ceremony, games, and shopping at the local stores.

=== Arts ===
The McKinney Performing Arts Center (MPAC) is housed in the historic Collin County courthouse in the square in historic downtown and was built in 1876 and remodeled in 1927. The MPAC has seating for 427 and regularly hosts live entertainment such as off-Broadway theater, comedy shows, and concerts, and is also the centerpiece for most large events, festivals, and other attractions that take place downtown.

=== Museums ===
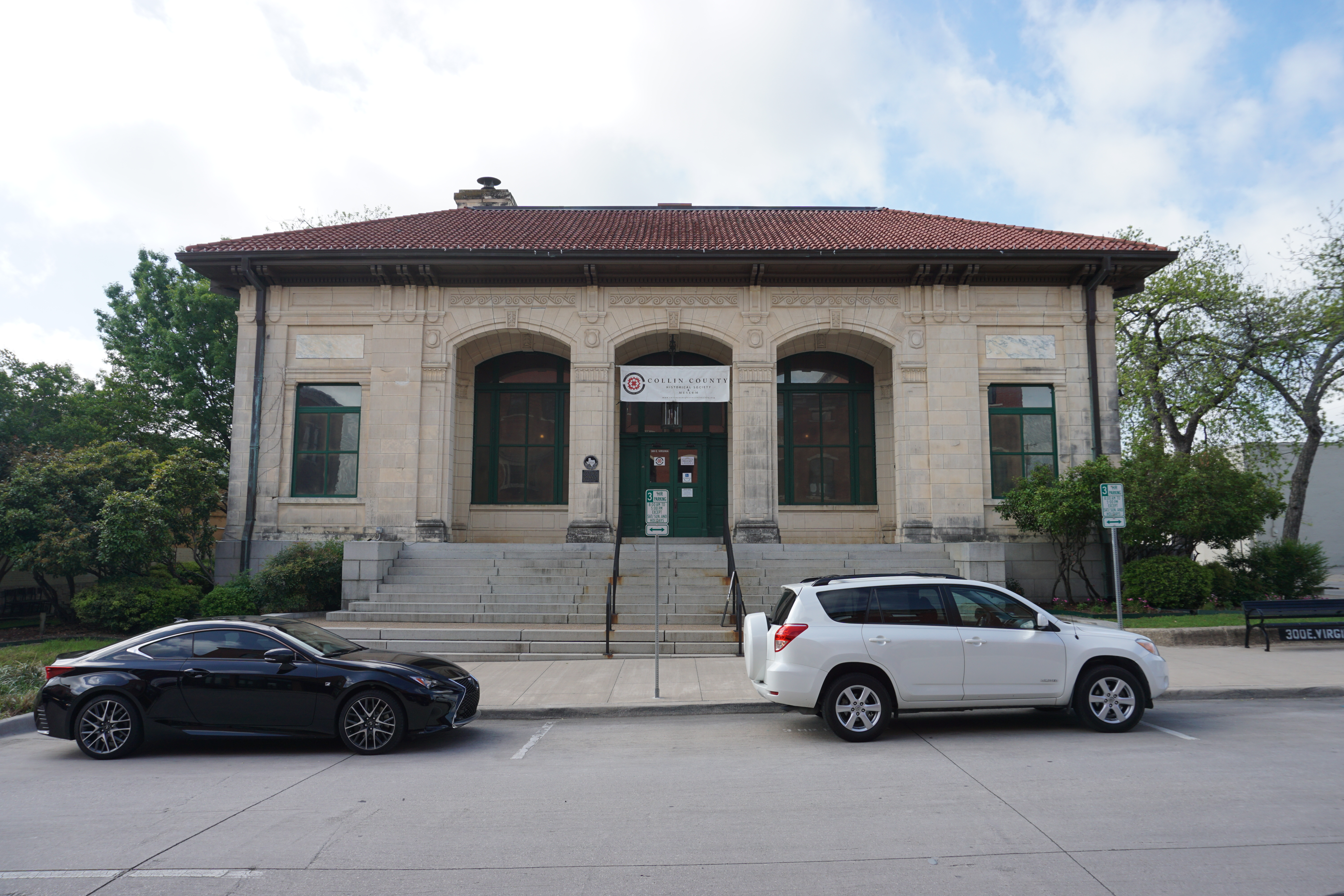
Collin County History Museum

Located in the historic 1911 McKinney Post Office in McKinney historic downtown, the Collin County History Museum has free admission several days a week and displays an extensive history of the Collin County area. This include an exhibit called "Created in Collin" that showcase the people, ideas, and products that began in Collin County.

The Heard Natural Science Museum & Wildlife Sanctuary is a 289-acre wildlife sanctuary with a museum building that has exhibits on natural history, fossils, rocks and minerals, and live animals. The wildlife sanctuary has 6.5 miles of trails through various types of terrain and is home to more than 240 species of mammals, birds, reptiles, and amphibians and 15o species of wildflowers and other plants. It contains a 50-acre wetlands with an outdoor learning center, observation deck, and boardwalk as well as an outdoor amphitheater with seating for 500 guests.

The Collin County Farm Museum is located at the Myers Park & Event Center in rural McKinney and has exhibits reflecting the early settlers in the area and the farming and agricultural history.

=== Nature ===
Erwin Park is a city owned park on 212 rural acres in northern McKinney. The park has designated overnight campsites and picnic pavilions as well as 10 miles of mountain bike trails maintained by the Dallas Off-Road Bicycle Association.

The McKinney Farmers Market is held every Saturday morning in the historic Chestnut Square Heritage Village and in 2023 it was named the #1 Farmers Market in the Southwest United States by the American Farmland Trust.

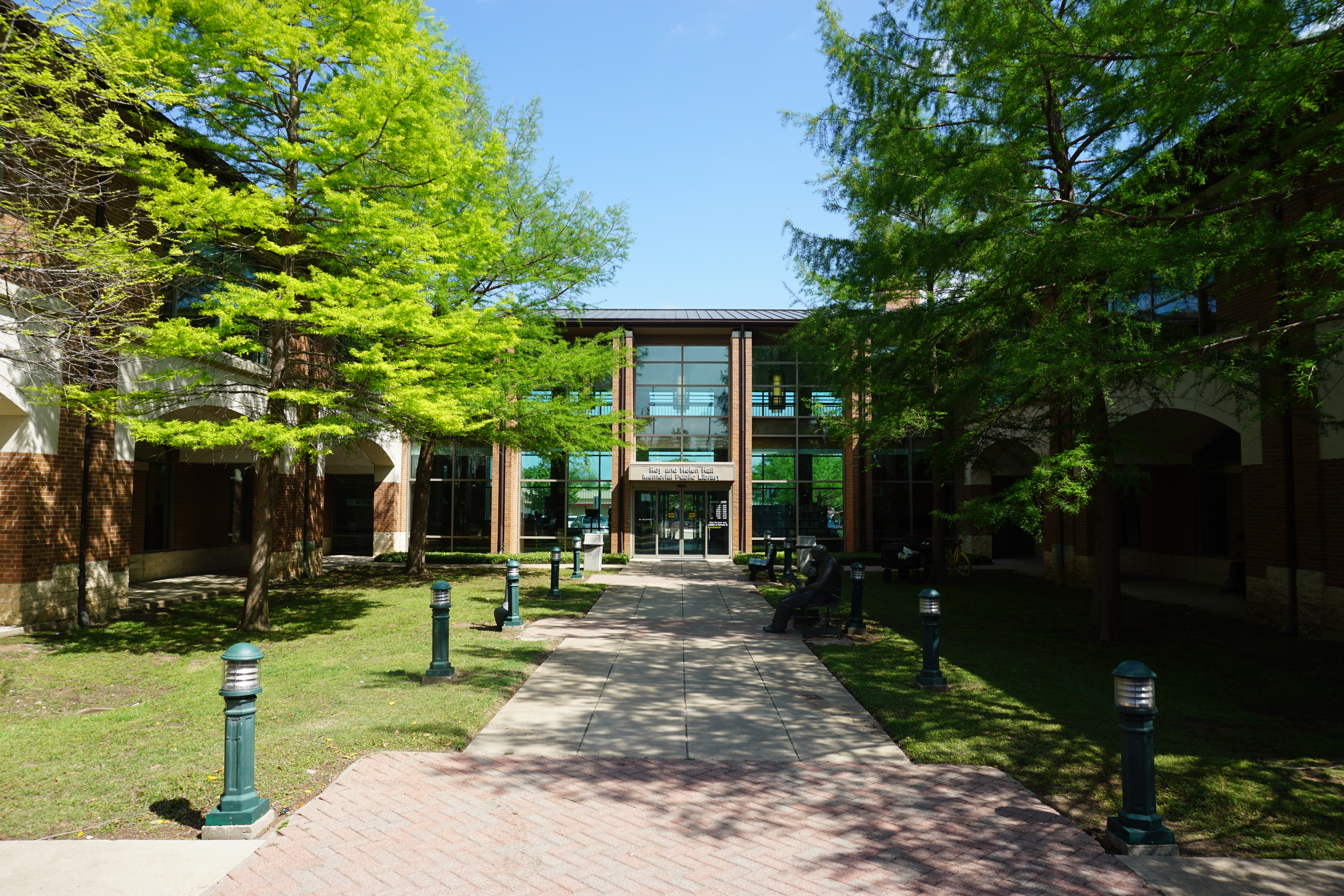
Roy & Helen Hall Memorial Library in 2017

=== Libraries ===
The city has two full-service libraries: the Roy & Helen Hall Memorial Library on the north end of the historic downtown, and the John & Judy Gay Library on Eldorado Parkway in western McKinney, that together lent out 1.6 million items during fiscal year 2022.

== Sports ==
McKinney has hosted the AT&T Byron Nelson golf tournament at the TPC Craig Ranch golf course since 2020.

The McKinney Independent School District football stadium, a 12,000-seat stadium, hosts the college Division II National Championship game.

== Government ==
=== Local government ===
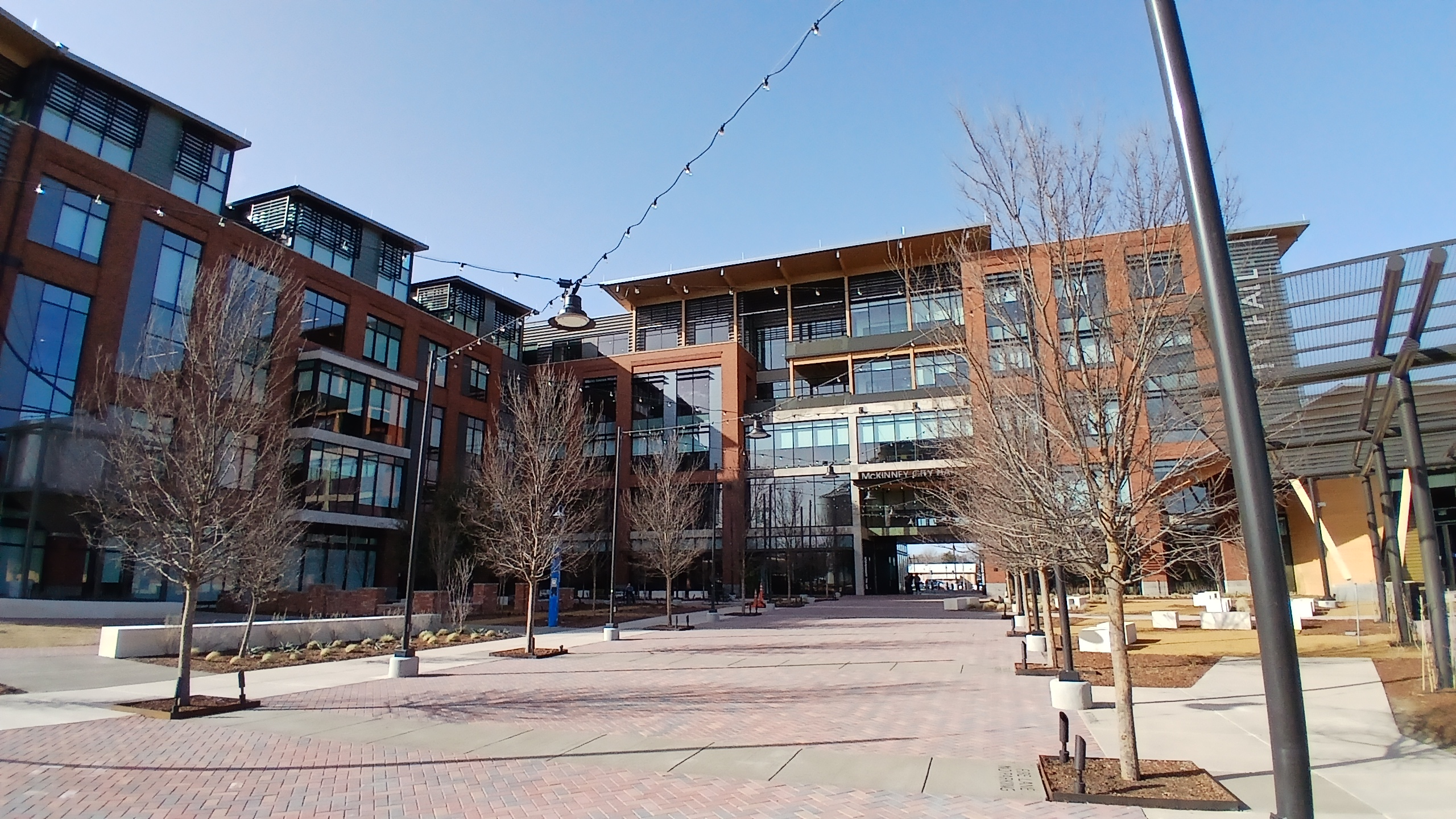
McKinney City Hall

According to the Comprehensive Annual Financial Report (2016), the city's various funds had $324.6 million in total revenues, $247.9 million in total expenditures, $1.36 billion in total assets, $437.6 million in total liabilities, and $363.9 million in cash and investments.

The McKinney City Council has seven members. Two members and the mayor are elected at large, and four members are elected to single-member districts.

McKinney's city manager serves under the direction of the city council, and administers and coordinates the implementation of procedures, policies, and ordinances.

The city of McKinney is a voluntary member of the North Central Texas Council of Governments association, the purpose of which is to coordinate individual and collective local governments and facilitate regional solutions, eliminate unnecessary duplication, and enable joint decisions.

=== State government ===
McKinney is represented in the Texas Senate by Republican Angela Paxton, District 8, and Republican Drew Springer, District 30. McKinney is also represented in the Texas House of Representatives by Republican Keresa Richardson, District 61, Republican Matt Shaheen, District 66, Republican Jeff Leach (politician), District 67, and Republican Candy Noble, District 89.

=== Federal government ===
At the federal level, Texas's U.S. senators are John Cornyn and Ted Cruz. McKinney is in the 3rd Congressional district, which is represented by Keith Self.

=== Police department ===
The McKinney Police Department is the primary municipal law enforcement agency that serves the city. Chief Joe Ellenburg is the head of the department. As of 2023, the department had 252 sworn peace officers and 81 non-sworn civilian positions.

The department was awarded national accredited status from the Commission on Accreditation for Law Enforcement Agencies (CALEA) and is also a Texas Police Chief's Association Foundation (TPCAF) Recognized Agency, making it only the third agency in Texas to receive both state and national accreditation.

Notable recent incidents in the department's history include the high-profile investigation of the McKinney homicide that claimed the lives of two adults and two high school football players; a 2010 attack on the police department headquarters by a gunman who fired over 100 rifle rounds at the building and employees after attempting to detonate a truck and trailer full of explosives; and protests and media attention after a video was released of the 2015 Texas pool party incident.

== Education ==
=== Colleges ===
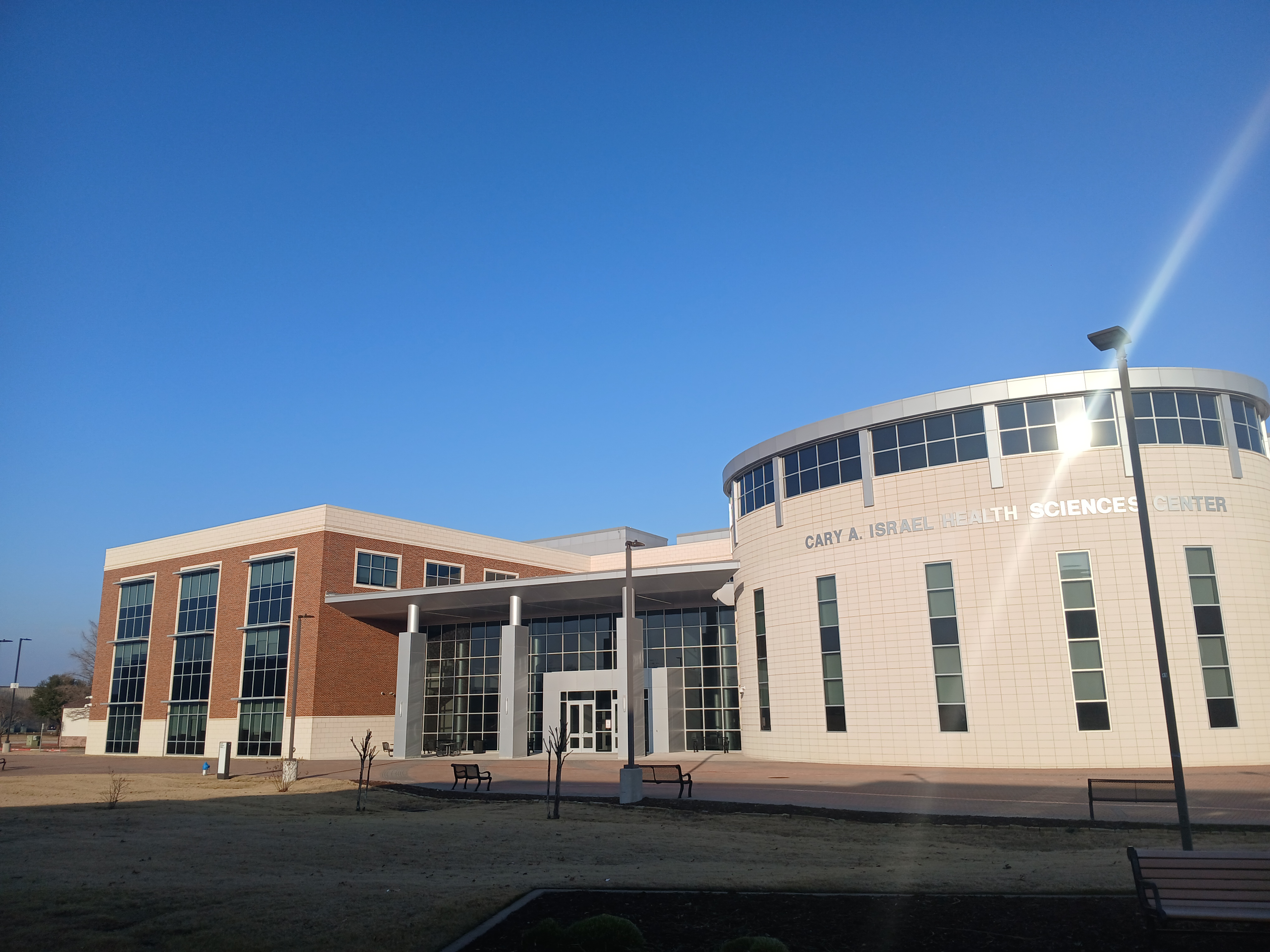
Cary A. Israel Health Sciences Center at Collin College's Central Park Campus

McKinney is the home of the McKinney Campus (formerly known as the Central Park Campus) of Collin College near the city's center at US 75 and US 380, which opened in 1985 as the initial campus for the community college district. The Collin Higher Education Center campus of Collin College opened in southern McKinney in 2010 and offers select bachelor's, master's, and doctoral degree programs in partnership with Texas A&M University-Commerce, Texas Woman's University, The University of Texas at Dallas, and the University of North Texas.

=== Public school districts ===
Two-thirds of McKinney residents are in the McKinney Independent School District; the remaining third are part of Frisco Independent School District, Prosper Independent School District, Allen Independent School District, Melissa Independent School District, Lovejoy Independent School District, or Celina Independent School District.

Different schools include Bennett Elementary, Finch Elementary, Johnson Elementary, Evans Middle School, and Faubion Middle School.

Six of the seven school districts serving the city placed in the top 5% in the Niche 2023 Best School Districts in America which ranked 10,932 school districts; Prosper ISD ranked #82 nationally, Allen ISD ranked #92, Lovejoy ISD ranked #103, Frisco ISD ranked #150, Melissa ISD ranked #433, and McKinney ISD ranked #461.

==== Public high schools ====
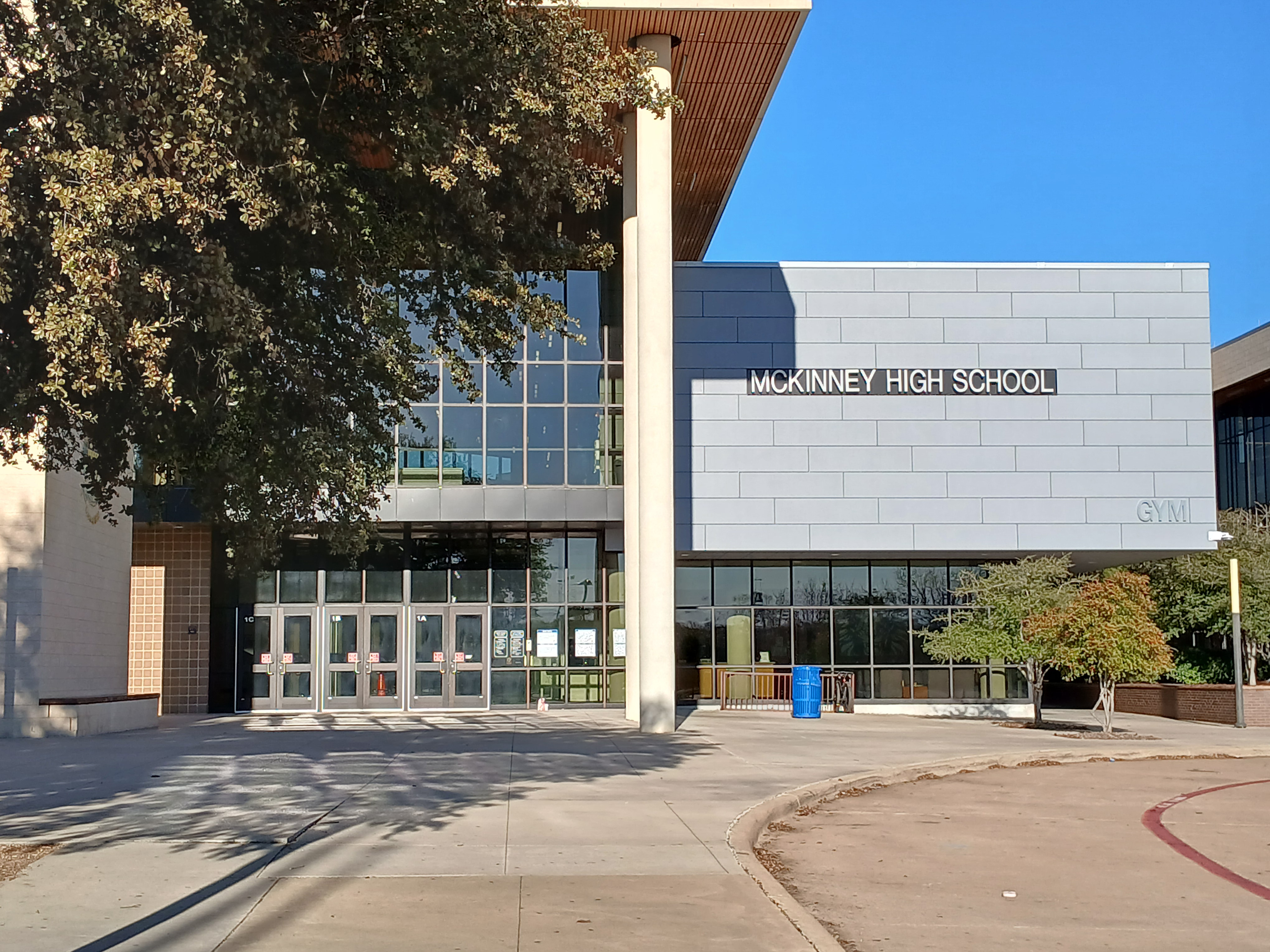
McKinney High School

For high school, the two thirds of the city's students are in McKinney ISD attend either McKinney High School, McKinney North High School or McKinney Boyd High School. The remaining third of McKinney students attend Emerson High School (Frisco ISD), Heritage High School (Frisco ISD), Independence High School (Frisco ISD), Rock Hill High School (Prosper ISD), Walnut Grove High School (Prosper ISD), Allen High School (Allen ISD), Melissa High School (Melissa ISD), Lovejoy High School (Lovejoy ISD), or Celina High School (Celina ISD).

In the 2023–2024 U.S. News & World Report rankings of 17,680 high schools nationwide, Lovejoy High School ranked #360, Independence High School ranked #687, Heritage High School ranked #837, McKinney North High School ranked #1,271, McKinney Boyd High School ranked #1,432, Allen High School ranked #1,704, Rock Hill High School ranked #2,563, McKinney High School ranked #2,629, Celina High School ranked #4,713, Melissa High School ranked #10,372, while Emerson High School and Walnut Grove High School were unranked due to being new schools.

=== Public charter schools ===
Imagine International Academy of North Texas is a no-tuition open-enrollment public charter school for grades K–12 in McKinney. It is open to students in any school district that serves McKinney residents. It is state-funded, independently run, and not part of any school district.

=== Private schools ===
There are two private schools in the city that serve all grades from K–12, McKinney Christian Academy and Cornerstone Christian Academy. Both schools are associated with non-denominational Christianity.

== Media ==
The McKinney Courier-Gazette is a daily newspaper published in McKinney, covering Collin County. It is owned by American Community Newspapers. It has a daily circulation of 4,400 and a Sunday circulation of 26,400.

== Infrastructure ==
=== Transportation ===
McKinney is served by two U.S. Highways: US 75 and US 380. The city is also bordered by the Sam Rayburn Tollway, a toll road administered by the North Texas Tollway Authority that runs to Dallas/Fort Worth International Airport.

==== Collin County Transit ====
McKinney operates the McKinney Urban Transit District (MUTD), branded as Collin County Transit. MUTD offers transit services to elderly, disabled, or low-income residents of McKinney, as well as Celina, Lowry Crossing, Melissa, Princeton, and Prosper.

Originally, MUTD subsidized the cost of taxi rides. In 2022, this was replaced by a curb-to-curb service (operated in association with Dallas Area Rapid Transit) that charges a fixed per-ride fare. MUTD services provide transportation to any location within Collin County, even those outside of participating cities, though trips outside of member cities have higher fares.

=== Roads ===
==== U.S Highways ====
- US 75 Runs North-South through McKinney and goes through Melissa and Anna to the north.
- US 380 Runs East-West through McKinney. In the east, 380 goes through Princeton and to the West, 380 goes through Prosper.

==== State Highways ====
- SH 5 Runs North-South through Downtown McKinney and goes through Melissa and Anna to the north.
- SH 121 (Sam Rayburn Tollway) Runs alongside U.S. Highway 75 before splitting off to form Sam Rayburn Tollway which run along the McKinney-Allen border.

==== Farm to Market roads ====
- Farm to Market Road 2478 Runs along the Frisco-McKinney border and merge into Sam Rayburn Tollway.
- Farm to Market Road 543 Small part runs through the northern edges of McKinney, merge into U.S. Route 380.

=== Air ===
McKinney National Airport is a public general aviation (GA) airport located in southeast McKinney that handles between 300 and 700 flights a day. The city purchased the airport in 1979, and in 2013 it also purchased the fixed-base operator, bringing the major revenue source at the airport directly under city control. In 2023, the airport completed an expansion to the GA terminal to provide more space and amenities for passengers and flight crews from the 20 to 30 corporate aircraft that use the airport daily. In January 2025, city officials approved a $72 million project to build a commercial airline terminal on the east side of the airport. In November of 2026, Avelo Airlines will commence service from McKinney to Fort Lauderdale, Fort Myers, Las Vegas, Orlando, and Tampa.

Aero Country Airport, located in western McKinney, is a privately owned public-use GA airport used primarily by single-engine aircraft, with about 30 flights per day.

=== Railways ===
McKinney is the southern terminus of a branch line of the Dallas, Garland and Northeastern Railroad that originates in Sherman. As of 2024, the rail line is used for freight haulage only; no scheduled passenger service is offered.

== Notable people ==
- Len Akin, professional football player
- Dillon Anderson, 2nd National Security Advisor
- R.C. Bales, bull rider
- Averie Bishop, businessperson, social media personality, Miss Texas 2022
- Mike Bolsinger, professional baseball pitcher, Toronto Blue Jays
- Larry Brantley, actor and comedian known for voicing Wishbone on the PBS series of the same name
- William Calhoun, professional wrestler who used the professional name "Haystack" or "Haystacks" Calhoun
- Hollie Cavanagh, singer who placed fourth on 11th season of American Idol
- Tommy Crutcher, football player; honorable mention All-State football at McKinney High School in 1959
- Clem Daniels, pro football player
- Elvis Duran, hall-of-fame radio host at Z100
- Gustavo Julian Garcia, convicted murderer executed in 2016 for a 1990 killing
- Chad Haga, professional road racing cyclist
- Kenneth E. Hagin, influential Pentecostal preacher
- Randy Ethan Halprin, a member of the Texas Seven
- Adrianna Hicks, actress
- Ronald Jones II, professional football player; graduate of McKinney North High School
- Tom Kite, professional golfer
- Brittany Lang, professional golfer, 2016 U.S. Women's Open champion
- Zach Lee, professional baseball player
- Anthony Lynn, former head coach of NFL's Los Angeles Chargers (2017–2020)
- Ray McDonald, NFL running back
- MO3, rapper
- Karthik Nemmani, 2018 Scripps National Spelling Bee champion
- Lee Nguyen, professional soccer player for New England Revolution
- Ken Paxton, Texas state senator from District 8; member of Texas House of Representatives, 2003–2013
- Alex Puccio, professional climber and bouldering champion
- Johnny Quinn, Olympic athlete
- Jason Ralph, actor
- Robert Richardson Jr., NASCAR driver
- Scott Sanford, certified public accountant; Republican member of Texas House of Representatives
- Keith Self, U.S. representative and former Collin County Judge
- Guinn Smith, gold medalist at 1948 Summer Olympics in pole vault
- Mason Thames, actor
- James W. Throckmorton, governor of Texas, U.S. congressman, and member of Texas Senate
- Andy Timmons, professional guitarist
- Ja'Kobe Walter, professional basketball player
- London Woodberry, professional soccer player
- Dudley Wysong, professional golfer

== See also ==
- Mickey Mantle World Series
