= Melissa, Texas =

- City
- Location of Melissa in Collin County, Texas
- Coordinates: 33°17′05″N 96°33′09″W
- Country: United States
- State: Texas
- County: Collin

Government
  - Type: Council-Manager
  - Mayor: Jay Northcut

Area
  - Total: 11.52 sq mi (29.83 km^{2})
  - Land: 11.45 sq mi (29.66 km^{2})
  - Water: 0.066 sq mi (0.17 km^{2})
- Elevation: 656 ft (200 m)

Population (2020)
  - Total: 13,901
  - Estimate (2025): 29,969
  - Density: 1,058.1/sq mi (408.52/km^{2})
- Time zone: UTC-6 (Central (CST))
  - Summer (DST): UTC-5 (CDT)
- ZIP codes: 75071, 75454
- Area codes: 214, 469, 945, 972
- FIPS code: 4847496
- GNIS feature ID: 2411073
- Website: cityofmelissa.com

Melissa is a city in Collin County, Texas, United States and is part of the Dallas metropolitan area. The population was 4,695 at the 2010 census, up from 1,350 at the 2000 census; in 2020, its population grew to 13,901.

== History ==
Among Melissa's earliest inhabitants were Paleo-Indians; archaeological finds in the area have been dated to approximately 9500 BC. In the centuries since, several Native American tribes called the area home, including the Caddo, Cherokee, Delaware, and the Kickapoo. The Tonkawa people had a settlement in the area, northeast of McKinney. These people were focused primarily on agriculture and a hunting-and-gathering lifestyle, living peacefully from the land's bounty.

Initially settlers came from the old Highland community, two and a half miles north of present-day Melissa. C.H. Wysong, a blacksmith, was one of the earliest settlers. A post office was established in 1853 at Highland. The Houston and Texas Central Railroad arrived in Melissa in 1872 and established a depot. The town was laid out at this time. The railroad encouraged many families to come to Melissa. The town is believed to have been named for the daughter of a railroad executive, George A. Quinlan (1838–1901) of the Houston and Texas Central Railroad. There is some disagreement about this, as others argue that the town was named after Melissa Huntington, daughter of C. P. Huntington, another well-known railroad executive. Anna, Texas, is named after Anna Elizabeth Quinlan (1878–1952), the only daughter of George Austin Quinlan and his wife Mary Kate Saunders (1851–1884). Quinlan, Texas, is named after George Austin Quinlan himself.

The first school in Melissa was built on land purchased in 1882 by trustees James Graves, John Gibson, and George Fitzhugh (son of William F. Fitzhugh), who were early settlers of the area. The first teacher was Mary Huckerston, who taught there for five years. The school began with 38 pupils. Church services were held there for all faiths on Sundays. A two-story brick schoolhouse was built on this site in 1910 to accommodate growth brought by the railroad.

Melissa was an important shipping point in the early 1900s. Corn, wheat, alfalfa hay, wood, and livestock were all sent out on the railroad.

A deadly F4 tornado struck Melissa on April 13, 1921, killing 13 people and injuring many more. The tornado tore the roof off of the brick school building, but the children inside were not seriously injured. However, all churches in the town, three cotton gins, every business house except a bank, the post office, and the Houston and Texas Central railway station, were wrecked. The Waldon Hotel was lifted by the winds, turned halfway around, and thrown up against the school building.

Eight years later, on August 8, 1929, a fire burned down many of the buildings that had been rebuilt after the tornado. Population declined from a high of 500 in 1925 down to 285 in 1949.

== Geography ==
Melissa is located in north-central Collin County. State Highway 5 passes through the center of the city, State Highway 121 passes through the eastern part, and the U.S. Route 75 freeway passes through the western side. US 75 and Highway 121 converge in the southwest part of Melissa, then head 6 miles (10 km) southwest to McKinney, the Collin County seat. The center of Dallas is 40 miles (64 km) southwest of Melissa, and Denison is 37 miles (60 km) to the north via US 75.

According to the United States Census Bureau, Melissa has a total area of 10.2 square miles (26.4 km^{2}), of which 10.1 square miles (26.2 km^{2}) is land and 0.08 square miles (0.2 km^{2}), or 0.66%, is water.

== Demographics ==
Historical population
| Census | Pop. | Note | %± |
|---|---|---|---|
| 1880 | 57 | | — |
| 1960 | 405 | | — |
| 1980 | 604 | | — |
| 1990 | 557 | | −7.8% |
| 2000 | 1,350 | | 142.4% |
| 2010 | 4,695 | | 247.8% |
| 2020 | 13,901 | | 196.1% |
| 2025 (est.) | 29,969 | | 115.6% |

=== Racial and ethnic composition ===
Melissa, Texas - Racial and ethnic composition (NH = Non-Hispanic) (Note: Note: the U.S. Census treats Hispanic/Latino as an ethnic category. This table excludes Latinos from the racial categories and assigns them to a separate category. Hispanics/Latinos can be of any race.)
| Race | Pop 2010 | Pop 2020 | % 2010 | % 2020 |
|---|---|---|---|---|
| White (NH) | 3,691 | 8,926 | 78.62% | 64.21% |
| Black or African American (NH) | 252 | 1,552 | 5.37% | 11.16% |
| Native American or Alaska Native (NH) | 45 | 118 | 0.96% | 0.85% |
| Asian (NH) | 27 | 475 | 0.58% | 3.42% |
| Pacific Islander (NH) | 6 | 10 | 0.13% | 0.07% |
| Some Other Race (NH) | 1 | 62 | 0.02% | 0.45% |
| Mixed/Multi-Racial (NH) | 73 | 761 | 1.55% | 5.47% |
| Hispanic or Latino | 600 | 1,997 | 12.78% | 14.37% |
| Total | 4,695 | 13,901 | 100.00% | 100.00% |

=== 2020 census ===
As of the 2020 census, Melissa had a population of 13,901. The median age was 32.9 years. 33.9% of residents were under the age of 18 and 8.0% of residents were 65 years of age or older. For every 100 females there were 96.2 males, and for every 100 females age 18 and over there were 91.5 males age 18 and over.

97.5% of residents lived in urban areas, while 2.5% lived in rural areas.

There were 4,250 households in Melissa, of which 56.7% had children under the age of 18 living in them. Of all households, 71.6% were married-couple households, 7.9% were households with a male householder and no spouse or partner present, and 16.2% were households with a female householder and no spouse or partner present. About 10.8% of all households were made up of individuals and 3.7% had someone living alone who was 65 years of age or older.

There were 4,444 housing units, of which 4.4% were vacant. The homeowner vacancy rate was 2.4% and the rental vacancy rate was 4.3%.

Racial composition as of the 2020 census
| Race | Number | Percent |
|---|---|---|
| White | 9,420 | 67.8% |
| Black or African American | 1,576 | 11.3% |
| American Indian and Alaska Native | 157 | 1.1% |
| Asian | 489 | 3.5% |
| Native Hawaiian and Other Pacific Islander | 10 | 0.1% |
| Some other race | 647 | 4.7% |
| Two or more races | 1,602 | 11.5% |
| Hispanic or Latino (of any race) | 1,997 | 14.4% |

=== 2010 census ===
As of the census of 2010, there were 4,695 residents.

=== 2000 census ===
As of 2000, there were 1,350 people, 472 households, and 365 families residing in the city. The population density was 294.4 inhabitants per square mile (113.7/km^{2}). There were 501 housing units at an average density of 109.3 per square mile (42.2/km^{2}).

In 2000, the racial makeup of the city was 89.63% White, 0.52% African American, 0.44% Native American, 0.52% Asian, 7.63% from other races, and 1.26% from two or more races. Hispanic or Latino of any race were 13.33% of the population.

There were 472 households, out of which 38.8% had children under the age of 18 living with them, 69.5% were married couples living together, 5.9% had a female householder with no husband present, and 22.5% were non-families. 18.6% of all households were made up of individuals, and 6.4% had someone living alone who was 65 years of age or older. The average household size was 2.86 and the average family size was 3.30.

In the city, the population was spread out, with 30.8% under the age of 18, 7.4% from 18 to 24, 28.2% from 25 to 44, 25.6% from 45 to 64, and 8.0% who were 65 years of age or older. The median age was 35 years. For every 100 females, there were 104.5 males. For every 100 females age 18 and over, there were 100.0 males.

According to the 2000 census, the median income for a household in the city was $60,909, and the median income for a family was $66,172. Males had a median income of $40,417 versus $30,435 for females. The per capita income for the city was $26,193. About 3.0% of families and 5.3% of the population were below the poverty line, including 8.9% of those under age 18 and 0.9% of those age 65 or over.

== Economy ==
According to the city's 2023 Annual Comprehensive Financial Report, the top 10 employers in the city are:

| # | Employer | # of Employees |
|---|---|---|
| 1 | Melissa Independent School District | 800 |
| 2 | Redden Concrete, Inc. | 428 |
| 3 | Beam Concrete Construction | 315 |
| 4 | Buc-ee's | 313 |
| 5 | NTMWD Regional Disposal | 113 |
| 6 | City of Melissa | 90 |
| 7 | McDonalds | 65 |
| 8 | Calhar Utility Construction | 62 |
| 9 | Braum's | 45 |
| 10 | CMC Rebar | 35 |

== Education ==
The city is served by the Melissa Independent School District. In 2004, McKinney ISD and Anna ISD refused to educate any more Melissa ISD high school classes. In 2007, Melissa High School graduated their first class with 46 students. Harry McKillop Elementary School opened its doors as the elementary school in fall 2008, housing Pre-K to third grade. The former Melissa Ridge Elementary School campus was converted to Melissa Ridge Intermediate School, serving fourth and fifth grades, and Melissa Middle School, serving sixth, seventh and eighth grades. In 2015, Melissa Middle School was awarded "A School to Watch" which gives them a high rank of schools in Texas. In 2019, Melissa Schools redistributed the allocation of campuses with the following changes. Melissa Ridge Education Center servicing pre-k through kindergarten, Harry McKillop Elementary School serving grades 1–5, North Creek Elementary School serving grades 1–5, Melissa Middle School grades 6–8, and Melissa High School serving traditional grades 9–12.

== Transportation ==
Both U.S Highway 75 and Texas State Highway 5 runs north to south through Melissa. Texas State Highway 121 runs northeast to southwest through Melissa eventually converging with 75 in the southwest corner of Melissa. FM 545 runs east to west through Melissa.

=== Roads ===
- US 75 Runs north to south through Melissa on the city's western side.
- SH 5 Runs north to south between U.S 75 and SH 121.
- SH 121 Runs northwest to southeast through Melissa. To the northwest is Westminster and to the southeast is McKinney.
- FM 545 runs east to west through Melissa. To the east, FM 545 goes to Blue Ridge.
