= Westminster Independent School District =

Former school district in Texas

Westminster Independent School District is a former school district which served the now-disincorporated community of Westminster, Texas (USA).

In 1988, Westminster ISD the Texas Education Agency cited several deficiencies in the school's operations, causing it to no longer be accredited. District voters in 1989 chose to disband the district.

The area is now served by the Anna Independent School District, which it merged into on July 1, 1989.
