= Old Collin County Courthouse =

Historic courthouse in McKinney, Texas

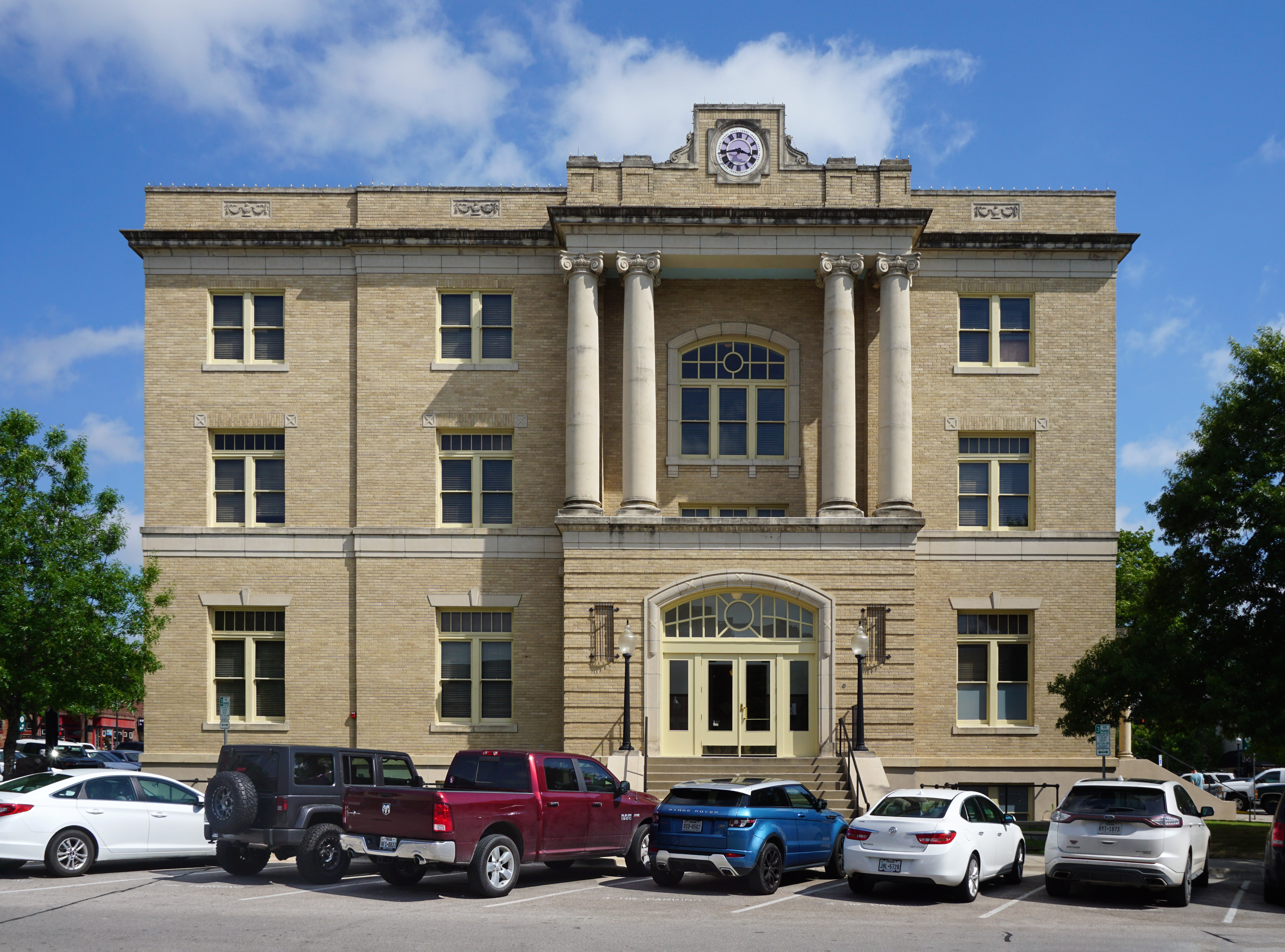
- Old Collin County Courthouse
- Interactive map of the Old Collin County Courthouse area

General information
- Type: Courthouse
- Architectural style: Second Empire (1876-1927) Neoclassical (1927-present)
- Location: 111 N Tennessee St, McKinney, United States
- Coordinates: 33.1976°N 96.61539°W
- Completed: 1876
- Renovated: 1927
- Closed: 1979

Technical details
- Floor count: 3
- Grounds: 35,848 sq ft

Design and construction
- Architect: Charles Wheelock (Second Empire)
- Main contractor: O. J. King

Renovating team
- Architect: W. A. Peters (Neoclassical)
- Renovating firm: Sparger And Peters

Recorded Texas Historic Landmark
- Official name: Old Collin County Courthouse (Note: The Old Collin County Courthouse contain two Recorded Texas Historic Landmark Designation with the other being the 1927 Collin County Courthouse.)
- Designated: 1982
- Reference no.: 948

The Old Collin County Courthouse is a historic courthouse located in the historic downtown McKinney, Texas. It was built in 1876 in the Second Empire style before being renovated in 1927 in the Neoclassical style. The courthouse continued to be used until 1979 when it was closed due to the completion of a new 6 story courthouse. In 1982, the courthouse was designated as a Recorded Texas Historic Landmark and in 2006, it was remodeled and reopened as the McKinney Performing Arts Center. As of 2025, the Old Collin County Courthouse has an approved master plan for full restoration from the Texas Historic Courthouse Preservation Program as part of the Texas Historical Commission

== History ==
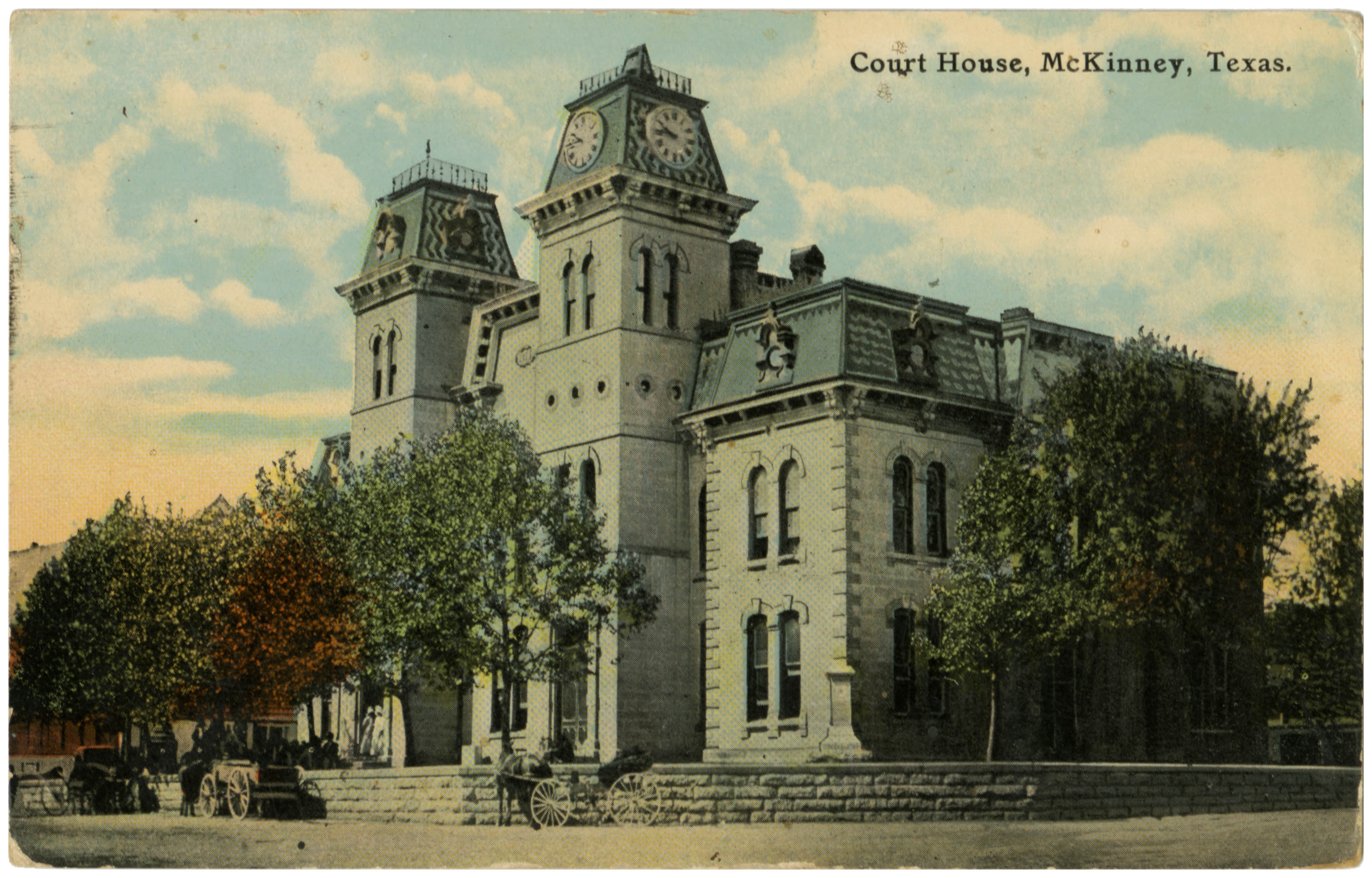
Postcard of the Old Collin County Courthouse in the Second Empire style

Before the Old Collin County Courthouse was built, several courthouse buildings made of wood were built to serve Collin County. In 1874 the county commissioners for Collin County approved plans for the construction of the Old Collin County courthouses. Construction was initiated under Sherman architect Charles Wheelock alongside contractor O. J. King. The courthouse was built in the Second Empire style and was completed in 1876.

By the mid 1920s, the courthouse has fallen into poor conditions and became overcrowded. Renovations of the courthouse begun under Paris architect W. A. Peters as part of the renovating firm Sparger and Peters. The renovation was completed in 1927 with the new renovated courthouse being remodeled into the Neoclassical style. The renovation saw the addition of a basement and a third floor.

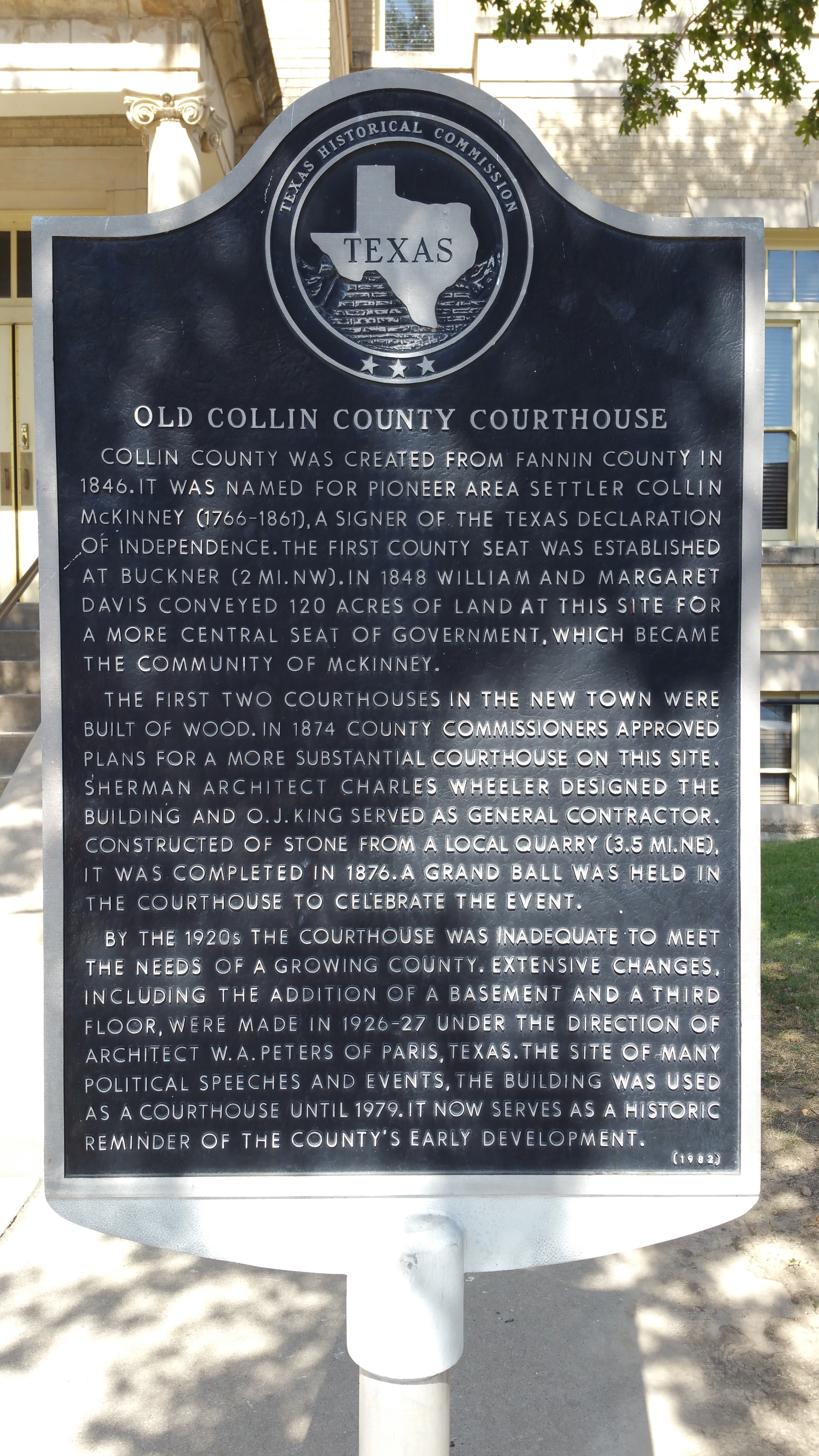
Old Collin County Courthouse Marker

In 1979, the courthouse was closed after the construction of a new courthouse on McDonald Street in McKinney. The last court cases held at the Old Collin Courthouse was in 1980. In 1982, the courthouse was officially marked as a Recorded Texas Historic Landmark and in 1983, the courthouse alongside other parts of downtown Collin County, became a part of the McKinney Commercial Historic District, which is listed in the National Register of Historic Places. Later in 1998, the courthouse would gain another Recorded Texas Historic Landmark designation as the 1927 Collin County Courthouse. The courthouse remained closed for 27 years until 2006 when it was repurposed and reopened as the McKinney Performing Arts Center. Since at least 2003, Collin County has been an applicant for the Texas Historic Courthouse Preservation Program and since 2004 had an approved master plan for full restoration.

== Architecture ==
When the Old Collin County Courthouse was first built in 1876 by Charles Wheelock, it was built in the Second Empire style of design and was located on a prototypical Shelbyville Square. The square itself occupy an area of 35,848 square foot. The courthouse originally consisted of two floors as well as a steep mansard roof with patterned shingles alongside decorative cut stone and twin towers above the roof line on the east side of the building. The stone used to build the courthouse were native limestone mined nearby from Squeezepenny, a town located northeast of McKinney.

In 1927, remodeling of the Old Collin County Courthouse into the Neoclassical style was completed by W. A. Peters. The newly renovated building saw the addition of a third floor and a basement. The former mansard roof was replaced with a concrete roof deck behind a new parapet. All the wood framing in the courthouse were replaced with fireproof steel and concrete with the floor space in the courthouse being doubled. In addition, the tower caps were removed while tripartite windows and flanking double classical columns were added with the columns being added on the north and south facade of the courthouse.

== See also ==
- List of county courthouses in Texas
- List of Recorded Texas Historic Landmarks
