= Melissa Independent School District =

School district in Texas

Coordinates: 33.2849°N 96.5706°W

Location
- Melissa, TX ESC Region 10 USA

District information
- Type: Public
- Grades: Pre-K through 12
- Superintendent: Keith Murphy

Students and staff
- Athletic conference: UIL Class AAAAA
- District mascot: Cardinal
- Colors: Red & White

Other information
- Website: www.melissaisd.org

Melissa Independent School District is a public school district based in Melissa, Texas (USA).

In addition to Melissa, the district serves a small portion of Weston and McKinney.

In 2009, the school district was rated "recognized" by the Texas Education Agency.

== History ==
Prior to 2003, Melissa ISD was a PK-8 district. High school students attended nearby Anna High School, McKinney High School, or McKinney North High School.

2003 - Melissa ISD welcomes its first 9th grade class.

2005 - Melissa High School opens its first campus with grades 9-11 at 3150 Cardinal Drive.

2008 - Harry McKillop Elementary opens with grades PK-4. Melissa Ridge Elementary is split into Melissa Ridge Intermediate - with grades 5-6 - and Melissa Middle - with grades 7-8.

2011 - 4th grade moves from Harry McKillop to Melissa Ridge.

2015 - 6th grade moves from Melissa Ridge to Melissa Middle.

2018 - North Creek Elementary opens. Both elementary schools house grades PK-5. Melissa Ridge temporarily closes. Melissa High moves into new campus. Melissa Middle moves into former Melissa High campus.

2019 - Melissa Ridge reopens as the Melissa Ridge Education Center, housing all MISD Pre-K and Kindergarten.

2021 - Willow Wood Elementary opens. Kindergarten moves from Melissa Ridge to zoned elementary campuses. Melissa Ridge continues to house all district Pre-K programs.

2023 - Sumeer Elementary opens.

2025 - East Cardinal Middle School opens with grades 7-8, replacing Melissa Middle School. 6th graders, which had been housed in the Melissa Ridge Education Center building for a few years, moves to the former MMS campus. (It is unclear when the Melissa Sixth Grade Center originally opened. However, it was previously housed at 2950 Cardinal Drive, the former site of Melissa Junior High, Melissa Middle School, and Melissa Ridge Intermediate. It possibly stayed behind when the 7th and 8th grades moved in 2018, or perhaps it was opened after Kindergarten returned to elementary schools in 2021.) Pre-K moves to zoned elementary campuses.

2026 - Melissa Ridge Reopens as Cardinal Renaissance Academy, a zoned elementary school that also hosts the district's Gifted & Talented and IB programs. Melissa Sixth Grade Center was original scheduled to transition to West Cardinal Middle School in 2026, with both middle schools housing grades 6-8. However, this was delayed.

Melissa ISD currently plans to have 1 high school and 3 middle schools (East, West, and North) at build-out.

== Schools ==
| School name | Grades | Year Founded | Additional information |
|---|---|---|---|
| Melissa High School | 9-12 | 2003 | Opened with grade 9. Current campus opened in 2018. |
| East Cardinal Middle School | 7-8 | 2025 | |
| Melissa Sixth Grade Center | 6 | | Originally opened at 2950 Cardinal Drive; Relocated to 3150 Cardinal Drive in 2025. |
| Cardnial Renaissance Academy | PK-5 | 2026 | Located at 2950 Cardinal Drive campus. |
| Harry McKillop Elementary School | PK-5 | 2008 | |
| Highland Elementary School | PK-5 | 2025 | |
| North Creek Elementary School | PK-5 | 2018 | |
| Sumeer Elementary School | PK-5 | 2023 | |
| Willow Wood Elementary School | PK-5 | 2021 | |
