= Anna High School (Texas) =

Location
- 1107 Rosamond Parkway; Anna, Texas 75409-0128; United States; 33.363253°N 96.562357°W

Information
- School type: Public high school
- Motto: Invest. Instill. Inspire.
- Founded: 1884
- School district: Anna Independent School District
- Principal: Ted Mackey
- Teaching staff: 89.04 (on an FTE basis)
- Grades: 9-12
- Enrollment: 1,487 (2023-24)
- Student to teacher ratio: 16.70
- Colors: Purple, White & Gray
- Athletics conference: 2024-2026 UIL: Class 5A Division 2 (Football) / Class 5A (Non-football)
- Mascot: Coyote
- Yearbook: The Coyote
- Website: ahs.annaisd.org

Anna High School is a public high school located in Anna, Texas (USA). It is classified as a 5A school by the University Interscholastic League. It is part of the Anna Independent School District located in north central Collin County. In 2022, the school was given an overall rating of "B" (86) by the Texas Education Agency, with distinction designations in science, comparative academic growth, and comparative closing the gaps.

== History ==
Beginning with the 1989–1990 school year, nearby Westminster High School closed and students there began attending Anna High School. AHS also served students from neighboring Melissa ISD until the 2004–2005 school year, when Melissa High School opened. AHS has been located at several campuses since the 1980s.

The school location in 1987 is now the district's Special Programs Center used for officing various department staff members and for holding school board meetings in its boardroom.

The AHS campus that opened in 2000 formerly housed Anna Middle School until the 2023 - 2024 school year when it was renamed to Slayter Creek Middle School.

The current campus opened for the 2011–2012 school year, and has been expanded over the years to accommodate additional students and programs. In the 2019 - 2020 school year, a career and technical education (CTE) expansion opened to allow for advanced CTE courses such as health science, criminal justice, graphic design, and video production. Currently a $12.5 million dollar expansion project is underway from the AISD 2022 bond that will add a classroom and gym expansion along with other building renovations. This is expected to be the final expansion projection for the campus as it reaches the optimal capacity set by the district's planning committee.

== Athletics ==
Anna High School competes in the following sports:

- Boys
  - Baseball
  - Basketball
  - Cross Country
  - Football
  - Golf
  - Powerlifting
  - Soccer
  - Tennis
  - Track and Field
  - Wrestling
- Girls
  - Basketball
  - Cross Country
  - Golf
  - Powerlifting
  - Soccer
  - Softball
  - Tennis
  - Track and Field
  - Volleyball
  - Wrestling

=== State title ===
- Boys Golf
  - 1968(B)
- Young Filmmakers
  - 2021(Division 1 Narrative)
- Concert Band
  - 2021(4A)
- Football
  - 2023(4A/D1)

=== State Finalists ===
- Marching Band
  - 2018(19th)(4A)
  - 2021(5th)(4A)
  - 2023(3rd)(4A) State Bronze Medalists
- TMEA Honor Band
  - 2017(12th)(4A)
- Concert Band
  - 2021(4th)(4A)

=== State Runner-ups ===
- Softball
  - 2019(4A)
- Girls Powerlifting
  - 2019(4A) Region 6 Division 2 Team Results
- Theatre and Film
  - 2020(Division 1 Narrative)
- Marching Band
  - 2022(4A) State Silver Medalists

== Notable alumni ==
- Jambres Dubar, college football running back for the Boise State Broncos
