= Melissa High School =

Location
- 3030 Milrany Ln; Melissa, Texas 75454; United States; 33.2874°N 96.5454°W

Information
- School type: Public high school
- School district: Melissa Independent School District
- Principal: Emily Chapman
- Teaching staff: 137.12 (FTE)
- Grades: 9–12
- Enrollment: 1,983 (2024–2025)
- Student to teacher ratio: 14.46
- Colors: Red, Black & White
- Athletics conference: UIL Class AAAAA
- Mascot: Cardinal
- Website: www.melissaisd.org/o/mhs

Melissa High School is a public high school in Melissa, Texas (United States). It is part of the Melissa Independent School District in north-central Collin County and classified as a 5A school by the UIL. The school is located on the northwest edge of the city of Melissa. For the 2024-2025 school year, the school received a rating of "A" from the Texas Education Agency.

== Staff/Administration ==
The current principal of Melissa High School is Emily Chapman. There are 4 assistant principals: Kristen Taylor, Blaze Blaine, Michelle Moore, and Nigel Smith. Michael Rolle is the associate principal. The other administration includes a Special Education Dean of Students, Amy Fortney, a Director of Athletics, and a Director of Fine Arts. These are Seth Stinton and Jerry Whorton.

== Athletics ==
The Melissa Cardinals compete in the following sports:

- Baseball
- Basketball
- Cross Country
- Football
- Golf
- Powerlifting
- Soccer
- Softball
- Tennis
- Track and Field
- Volleyball
- Wrestling
- Marching band

=== State Titles ===
- Football
  - 2011(2A/D1)
- Softball
  - 2024(5A), 2025(5A/D1)

== Coach Kenny Deel Stadium ==
In August 2023, Melissa High School opened a new $35 million football stadium and indoor practice facility. Despite the fact that the school only had about 1,300 students at the time of completion, Coach Kenny Deel Stadium seats about 10,000 people. The stadium also features common areas, luxury suites, concessions, restrooms, locker rooms, and eight academic classrooms, some of which are used for Melissa's elementary Gifted and Talented program(GT).The five-story press box at the stadium features two VIP rooms, five sky perches, and a large common space for activities such as communication construction.

== Notable alumni ==
- Brendon Lewis (class of 2020), quarterback for the Memphis Tigers
- Nigel Smith II (class of 2024), defensive end for the Oklahoma Sooners
