= Anna Independent School District =

School district in Texas, United States

- Anna ISD's location in the DFW Metroplex.

Address
- 151 W. Rosamond Parkway Anna, Texas, USA ESC Region 10
- Coordinates: 33°20′43″N 96°32′53″W

District information
- Type: Independent School District
- Motto: To invest in academic excellence, instill values and inspire students.
- Grades: PK-12
- Established: May 17, 1909; 117 years ago
- Superintendent: Toby Tucker
- Governing agency: Texas Education Agency
- Schools: 9
- NCES District ID: 4808340

Students and staff
- Students: 6,724 (2025-26)
- Athletic conference: UIL Class AAAAA
- District mascot: Coyotes
- Colors: Purple & White

Other information
- Website: www.annaisd.org

Anna Independent School District (Anna ISD or AISD) is a public school district based in Anna, Texas, United States. Covering approximately 61 square miles in Collin County, the district serves the City of Anna, the census-designated place of Westminster, and their surrounding areas.

As of 2026, Anna ISD operates 9 campuses, including 1 high school, 2 middle schools, 5 elementary schools, and 1 alternative school. The district most recently received a "C" rating from the Texas Education Agency (TEA).

== History ==
Anna ISD's original colors were Blue and Gold until the 1950s, when TCU donated old uniforms to AHS.

Upon the closure of Westminster ISD during the 1989–90 school year, students from Westminster were annexed into Anna and Van Alstyne ISDs. Conversely, prior to the 2004–05 school year, Melissa ISD only educated students through grade 8, so students in that district went to high school at either McKinney High School (before Fall 2000), McKinney North High School (after Fall 2000), or Anna High School.

Due to the district's location along U.S. 75, it has outgrown several schools in its history.

1895 - The current Administration Building opened as Anna High School.

1973 - The northwest building of the current Anna Education Center (AEC) opened as a K–8 campus.

1988 - The current Special Programs Center opened as Anna High School.

1989 - Westminster Independent School District merged into Anna ISD on July 1, 1989.

1994 - The southwest building of the current AEC opened as a K–5 campus.

1995 - The southeast building, a gymnasium, of the current AEC opened for grades K–8.

1996 - The northeast building of the current AEC opened housing PK and the PK–8 cafetorium.

2000 - The current Slayter Creek Middle School opened as Anna High School. AMS moved to the 1988 facility, while Anna Elementary School took over the former middle school building.

2005 - Joe K. Bryant Elementary opened as a 1−4 campus. PK-K and 5-6 stayed at the current AEC campus.

2007 - Sue E. Rattan Elementary opened, with both elementary schools housing PK-5, closing AES.

2011 - The current Anna High School opened as a 9−12 campus. AMS moved to 2000 campus and the Special Programs Center is created in its current home.

2013 - The Early Childhood Center opened as a PK-K campus, with both elementary schools housing grades 1–5.

2017 - Judith L. Harlow Elementary opened at the ECC site in August, replacing the ECC. All 3 elementary schools housed K−5, while Bryant Elementary also housed PK.

2018 - Harlow Elementary moved into its new, permanent school building in January, leaving vacant the former ECC campus. Coyote Stadium underwent renovation, reopening as Anna ISD Stadium.

2019 - Anna High School's expansion opened, bringing capacity up to 1350. The ECC site reopened as the Anna Education Center, housing grades PK and 6. AMS housed grades 7–8.

2022 - Anna High School opened its second expansion, upping capacity to 1800. Rosamond-Sherley Elementary opened. PK was removed from the AEC and all elementary campuses housed grades PK-5. A November 2022 bond passed, funding future schools (ES #5-#8, MS #3-#4, and HS #2), new Administration Building and Service Center, land purchases, and another AHS expansion.

2023 - Anna Middle School was renamed Slayter Creek Middle School. Clemons Creek Middle School opened. Both campuses housed grades 6–8. The AEC closed. Anna ISD moved to a four-day school week.

2025 - Lorenzo Dow Hendricks Elementary school opened.

At build-out, Anna ISD was originally expected to have four 1800-capacity high schools, eight 850-capacity middle schools, and sixteen 750-capacity elementary schools. Anna ISD changed the facility plan to have 3-4 bigger high schools with 2000-2500 students in the early 2020s. A bond was passed in November 2022 to build elementary schools #5-#8, middle schools #3-#4, and high school #2. High School #2 was originally intended to open for the 2028-2029 school year, but no contracts have been awarded as of August 2026. Additionally, school board agendas show expansions will soon be developed at Harlow Elementary, Rosamond-Sherley Elementary, and Clemons Creek Middle School, with Slayter Creek Middle School Receiving a new campus. Presumably, the current Slayter Creek Middle School campus will be converted to a freshman-only facility.

== Finances ==
As of the 2010–11 school year, the appraised valuation of property in the district was $504,279,000. The maintenance tax rate was $0.104 and the bond tax rate was $0.050 per $100 of appraised valuation.

== Academic achievement ==
In 2011, the school district was rated "recognized" by the Texas Education Agency. Thirty-five percent of districts in Texas in 2011 received the same rating. No state accountability ratings will be given to districts in 2012. A school district in Texas can receive one of four possible rankings from the Texas Education Agency: Exemplary (the highest possible ranking), Recognized, Academically Acceptable, and Academically Unacceptable (the lowest possible ranking).

Historical district TEA accountability ratings
Year	Rating	Scores
2025-26	C	74
2024-25	C	78
2023-24	C	79
2022-23	C	78
2021-22	B	86
2011	Recongnized	
2010	Recongnized	
2009	Academically Acceptable	
2008	Academically Acceptable	
2007	Academically Acceptable	
2006	Academically Acceptable	
2005	Academically Acceptable	
2004	Recongnized	

== Demographics ==
Anna ISD Ethnicity Data 2025-26
Ethnicity	Percent
White	31.6%
Hispanic	29.4%
African American	27.8%
Two or More Races	6.7%
Asian	3.8%
American Indian	0.4%
Pacific Islander	0.2%

== Facilities ==
Current Schools
School name	Grades	Year founded	Additional information
Anna High School	9-12	1884	Relocated 1910, 1988, 2000, 2011
Clemons Creek Middle School	6-8	2023	
Slayter Creek Middle School	6-8	2023	Renamed from Anna Middle School in 2023; Located in former 2000 AHS building
Joe K. Bryant Elementary School	PK-5	2005	PK-5 2007–2013, 2017–2019, 2022–Present; K-5 2019–2022; 1-5 2013–2017; 1-4 2005–2007
Judith L. Harlow Elementary School	PK-5	2017	PK-5 2019–present; K-5 2017–2019; Opened at former Anna ECC campus; Relocated 1/2018
Lorenzo Dow Hendricks Elementary School	PK-5	2025	
Sue E. Rattan Elementary School	PK-5	2007	PK-5 2007–2013, 2021–present; 1-5 2013–2017; K-5 2017–2021
Rosamond-Sherley Elementary School	PK-5	2022	
Anna Academic Achievement Center	Alternative Education	2011	DAEP and Credit Recovery; Located in the previous Anna Education Center Facility

Other Facilities
School name	Grades	Year built	Additional information
Anna ISD Administration Building	N/A	2025	
Anna ISD Special Programs Center	N/A	1988	Former Anna High School. Now used as office space.
W.L. Roper Professional Building	N/A	1910	Former Anna ISD Administration Building. Now used as office space.

Future Schools
School name	Grades	Projected Opening	Additional information
Ora Bell Russel Elementary School	PK-5	2027	Funded by November 2022 bond
Anna ISD Elementary School #7	PK-5	2029	Funded by November 2022 bond
Anna ISD Elementary School #8	PK-5	??	Funded by November 2022 bond
Anna ISD Middle School #3	6-8	Originally 2026 - no work started	Funded by November 2022 bond
Anna ISD Middle School #4	6-8	??	Funded by November 2022 bond
Anna ISD High School #2	9-12	Originally 2028 - no work started	Funded by November 2022 bond

Former Schools
School name	Year founded	Year closed	Additional information
Anna Elementary School	1973	2007	Relocated 1994; Grades K-8 1973–1994, K-5 1994–1996, PK-5 1996–2005, PK-K 2005–2007
Anna Early Childhood Center	2013	2017	Located in 1973, 1994, 1995, and 1996 buildings; Grades PK-K
Anna Education Center	2019	2023	Located in 1973, 1994, 1995, and 1996 buildings; Grades PK,6 2019–2022; 6 2022–2023
Anna Middle School	1994	2023	Relocated 2000, 2011; 6-8 1994–2000, 2007–2019; 7-8 2019–2023; 5-8 2000–2007

== See also ==
- List of school districts in Texas
- List of high schools in Texas
