= Anna, Texas =

City in Texas, United States

- City
- Motto: "Your Hometown"
- Interactive map of Anna, Texas
- Coordinates: 33°21′20″N 96°33′43″W
- Country: United States
- State: Texas
- County: Collin

Government
  - Type: Council-Manager
  - Mayor: Pete Cain

Area
  - Total: 16.53 sq mi (42.82 km^{2})
  - Land: 16.44 sq mi (42.59 km^{2})
  - Water: 0.089 sq mi (0.23 km^{2})
- Elevation: 699 ft (213 m)

Population (2020)
  - Total: 16,896
  - Estimate (2025): 35,245
  - Density: 912.1/sq mi (352.18/km^{2})
- Time zone: UTC−6 (Central (CST))
  - Summer (DST): UTC−5 (CDT)
- ZIP Code: 75409
- Area codes: 214, 469, 945, 972
- FIPS code: 48-03300
- GNIS feature ID: 2409712
- Website: www.annatexas.gov

Anna is a city in the U.S. state of Texas. Located in Collin County, its population was 16,896 at the 2020 U.S. census. Anna is included in the Dallas–Fort Worth metroplex.

== History ==
Following the American Civil War, the Houston and Texas Central Railway resumed laying track north from Corsicana and passed through the area in 1872. By the time Anna was platted in 1883, it had a population of 20, two stores, a steam gristmill, and a Baptist church. A post office also opened in that year. In 1885, the railroad built a depot. The Anna Depot remains today as the oldest extant railroad station in Texas.

By 1890 the town had a population of nearly 200. Anna was incorporated in 1913, with John L. Greer as first mayor.

Local historian Chester A. Howell (1921-2019) compiled a brief history of Anna for inclusion in a book, A Town Named Anna, that was given to those who attended the Anna school homecoming on October 19, 1985. A one-page list of errata to correct some minor errors was added in 1989. In 2018, the Anna Area Historical Preservation Society published, "The Spark That Ignited The Town Of Anna" (ISBN 9781799137610), a collection of stories and pictures of early Anna, Texas.

The Houston and Texas Central Railway extended its track in a north–south route several miles east of Mantua in 1872. Mantua soon declined in favor of the new railroad towns of Van Alstyne (Grayson County) and Anna which developed here in early 1880s.

=== Namesake ===
The town was named in honor of Miss Anna Quinlan, daughter of George A. Quinlan, superintendent of the Houston and Texas Central Railroad.

=== First Christian Church of Anna ===
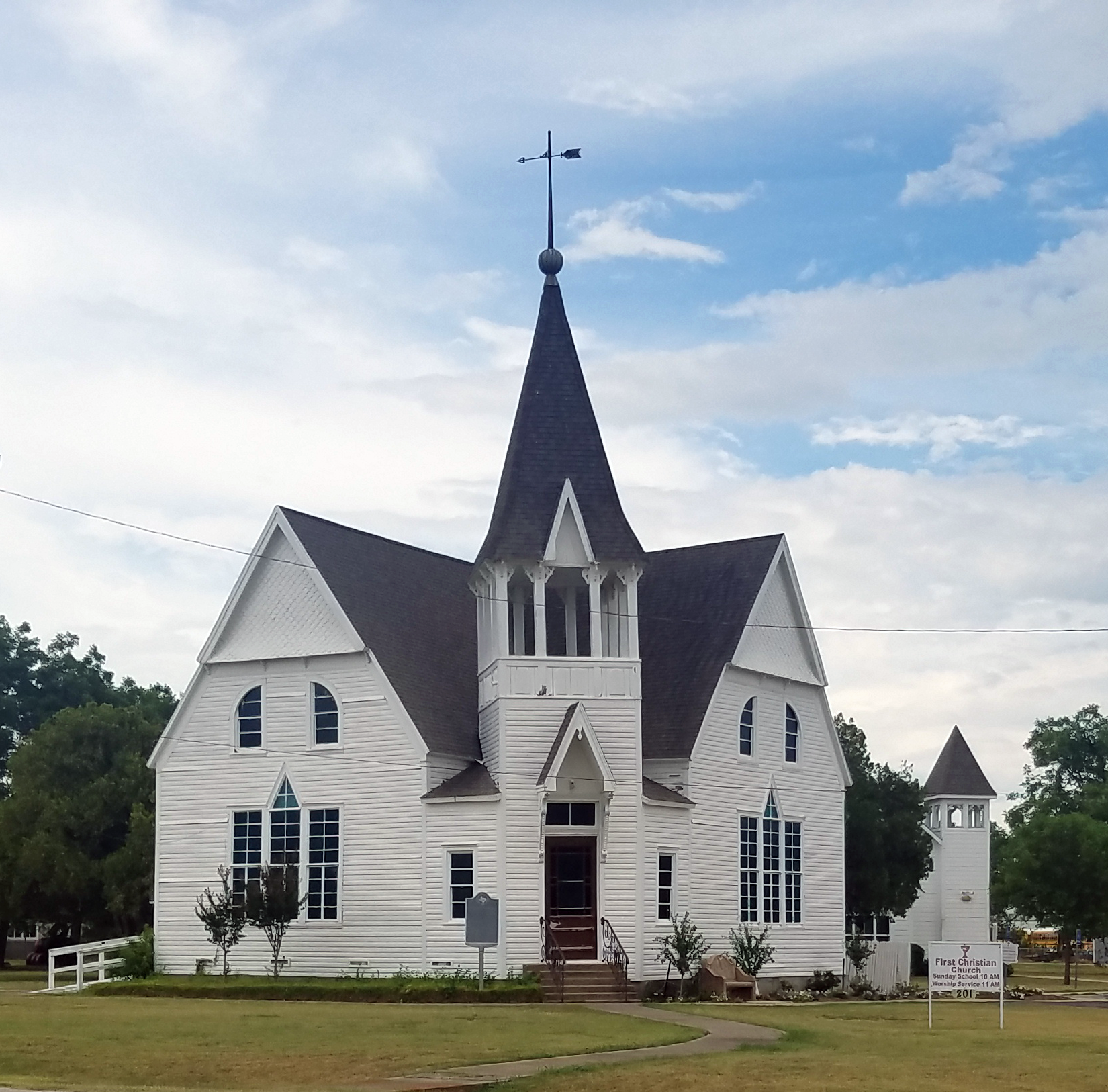
First Christian Church of Anna (née, Liberty Christian Church), one of the earliest Christian Churches in Texas, was founded by pioneer settlers Collin McKinney and J.B. Wilmeth in 1846.

Liberty Christian Church, one of the earliest Christian Church (Disciples of Christ) churches in Texas, was founded in northern Collin County by pioneer settlers Collin McKinney and J. B. Wilmeth in 1846. In 1854, a Christian seminary was established by members of the Liberty congregation about two miles northwest of Anna in the (then) newly established community of Mantua.

According to local tradition Mantua's Christian congregation split between the two new communities. Former Mantua church members and early Anna resident Rebecca Sherley helped organize the First Christian Church of Anna in 1882. The Rev. Alf Douglas served as first Pastor. Services were held in the Sherley home until it burned in 1886. About 1890 the sanctuary was built here at the site of the former Sherley home. Major additions to the rear of the sanctuary were completed in 1949.

=== A. Sherley and Brother Hardware Store ===
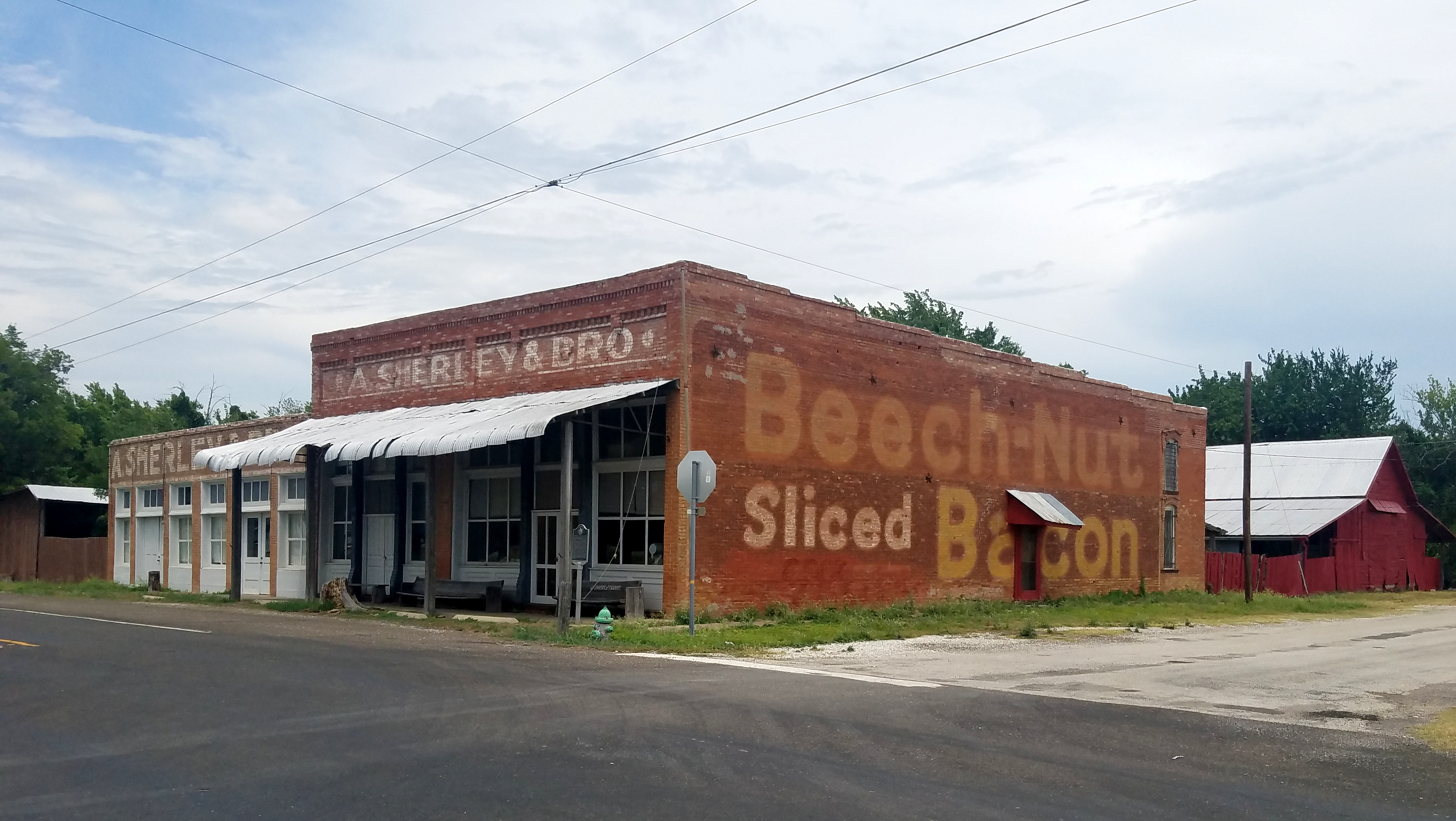
A. Sherley and Brothers Hardware Store

Lewis and Pauline Sherley moved to north Texas from Kentucky about 1853. Their grandsons, brothers Andrew, Benjamin and Fred Sherley, opened a hardware store in 1894. Eventually Fred bought out the other brothers. It remained in the family after the store closed in 1984. Over time they were undertakers as well as purveyors of furniture, farming implements and machinery, wagons, cotton, grain and groceries. Wagon-weighing scales in front of the building were removed when the road was widened. The structure is a fine example of an early Texas commercial building, retaining the original canopy and painted signs. Minimal Victorian-era detailing includes corbelled brickwork in the parapet and paneled kickplates on storefront display windows.

=== Tornado ===
On May 9, 2006, a storm producing two tornadoes swept across Anna, with the first tornado (F0) passing 2.5 miles (4.0 km) east of the high school, barely missing the incorporated city limits. The second tornado (F3) touched down in neighboring Westminster and Whitewright, destroying many homes and killing three. During the disaster, several volunteers from Collin County Amateur Radio Services worked with the National Weather Service in a Skywarn net. The Anna police and fire departments along with the American Red Cross opened Anna High School up as a shelter to the "walking wounded" and anyone who needed a place to stay due to the road blockages and damage in that area. The tornadoes could be seen from Anna, Van Alstyne, and Melissa, and power was knocked out to several homes in the area.

== Geography ==
Anna is located in northern Collin County at 33°21′01″N 96°33′03″W. U.S. Route 75 freeway passes through the west side of the city and leads 45 miles (72 km) southwest to the center of Dallas and 32 miles (51 km) north to Denison.

According to the United States Census Bureau, the city of Anna has a total area of 14.1 square miles (36.6 km^{2}), of which 14.1 square miles (36.4 km^{2}) is land and 0.1 square miles (0.2 km^{2}), or 0.46%, is water. According to the City of Anna website, the city has a total area of approximately 15 square miles (39 km^{2}) in its city limits and approximately 60 square miles (160 km^{2}) in its planning area.

=== Climate ===
The climate in this area is characterized by relatively high temperatures and evenly distributed precipitation throughout the year. The Köppen climate classification system describes the weather as humid subtropical, Cfa.

Climate data for Anna, Texas
Month	Jan	Feb	Mar	Apr	May	Jun	Jul	Aug	Sep	Oct	Nov	Dec	Year
Mean daily maximum °C (°F)	13 (55)	14 (58)	20 (68)	26 (78)	29 (84)	36 (96)	36 (96)	36 (96)	31 (88)	26 (79)	19 (66)	12 (53)	24 (76)
Mean daily minimum °C (°F)	0 (32)	1 (33)	6 (43)	10 (50)	16 (60)	20 (68)	21 (69)	21 (69)	18 (64)	11 (52)	6 (42)	−1 (31)	11 (51)
Average precipitation mm (inches)	56 (2.2)	71 (2.8)	84 (3.3)	81 (3.2)	140 (5.7)	120 (4.6)	64 (2.5)	51 (2)	99 (3.9)	120 (4.7)	86 (3.4)	76 (3)	1,050 (41.2)
Source: Weatherbase

== Demographics ==
As of the 2020 census, there were 16,896 people residing in the city.

=== Racial and ethnic composition ===
Anna, Texas - Racial and ethnic composition (NH = Non-Hispanic) (Note: Note: the US Census treats Hispanic/Latino as an ethnic category. This table excludes Latinos from the racial categories and assigns them to a separate category. Hispanics/Latinos can be of any race.)
Race	Pop 2010	Pop 2020	% 2010	% 2020
White (NH)	5,588	9,452	67.74%	55.94%
Black or African American (NH)	602	2,080	7.30%	12.31%
Native American or Alaska Native (NH)	72	89	0.87%	0.53%
Asian (NH)	68	353	0.82%	2.09%
Pacific Islander (NH)	4	18	0.05%	0.11%
Some Other Race (NH)	6	95	0.07%	0.56%
Mixed/Multi-Racial (NH)	184	879	2.23%	5.2%
Hispanic or Latino	1,725	3,930	20.92%	23.26%
Total	8,249	16,896	100.00%	100.00%

=== 2020 census ===
As of the 2020 census, Anna had a population of 16,896. The median age was 31.7 years. 31.9% of residents were under the age of 18 and 7.3% of residents were 65 years of age or older. For every 100 females there were 96.3 males, and for every 100 females age 18 and over there were 92.2 males age 18 and over.

92.3% of residents lived in urban areas, while 7.7% lived in rural areas.

There were 5,298 households in Anna, of which 51.1% had children under the age of 18 living in them. Of all households, 62.9% were married-couple households, 11.2% were households with a male householder and no spouse or partner present, and 19.1% were households with a female householder and no spouse or partner present. About 13.1% of all households were made up of individuals and 3.4% had someone living alone who was 65 years of age or older. The census recorded 3,792 families residing in the city.

There were 5,551 housing units, of which 4.6% were vacant. Among occupied housing units, 75.8% were owner-occupied and 24.2% were renter-occupied. The homeowner vacancy rate was 2.1% and the rental vacancy rate was 5.8%.

Racial composition as of the 2020 census
Race	Percent
White	62.8%
Black or African American	12.6%
American Indian and Alaska Native	1.1%
Asian	2.2%
Native Hawaiian and Other Pacific Islander	0.1%
Some other race	7.7%
Two or more races	13.4%
Hispanic or Latino (of any race)	23.3%

== Economy ==
According to the city's 2023 Annual Comprehensive Financial Report, the top 10 employers in the city are:

#	Employer	# of Employees
1	Anna Independent School District	847
2	Walmart	450
3	City of Anna	185
4	Pate Rehab	170
5	Brookshire's	100
6	Loves Travel Stop	56
7	Hurricane Creek County Club	52
8	McDonalds	50
9	Bronco Manufacturing	35
10	Tri-County Vet	11

== Education ==
The vast majority of the area is in the Anna Independent School District. A small section extends into the Blue Ridge Independent School District.

Anna High School is the comprehensive high school of the Anna district.

Collin College covers all of Collin County in its service area.

== Notable people ==
- Ralph Fults (1911–1993), outlaw and associate of the Barrow gang
- Curley Johnson (1935-2016), American football player
- Kewpie Morgan (1892–1956), American silent film comedian
