= List of nature centers in Texas =

Texas Nature Centers (Hover mouse over pog to popup clickable link)

This is a list of nature centers and environmental education centers in the state of Texas.

To use the sortable tables: click on the icons at the top of each column to sort that column in alphabetical order; click again for reverse alphabetical order.

Name	Location	County	Region	Summary
Acton Nature Center of Hood County	Granbury	Hood	North Texas	website, 74 acres with over 5 miles of trails
Armand Bayou Nature Center	Houston	Harris	Texas Coastal Bend	2,500-acre urban preserve, includes a boardwalk through forest and marshes, live animal displays, bison and prairie platforms and butterfly gardens
Austin Nature & Science Center	Austin	Travis	Texas Hill Country	website, operated by the City in 351-acre Zilker Park, includes hands-on educational exhibits, live native animals, an outdoor paleontology exhibit
Bay Education Center	Rockport	Aransas	Texas Coastal Bend	Operated by the University of Texas at Austin Marine Science Institute, ecosystem of the Mission-Aransas National Estuarine Research Reserve
Baytown Nature Center	Baytown	Harris	Texas Coastal Bend	Operated by the City, 450-acre recreation area and wildlife sanctuary
Bear Springs Blossom Nature Center	Pipe Creek	Bandera	Texas Hill Country	website, 125 acres
Bentsen-Rio Grande Valley State Park	Mission	Hidalgo	Texas Coastal Bend	764 acres, headquarters of the World Birding Center, exhibit hall, observation tower, bird blinds, guided walks
Bob Jones Nature Center	Southlake	Denton	North Texas	website, 758 acres, operated by the City
Brazos Bend State Park	Needville	Fort Bend	Texas Gulf Coast	4,897 acres, nature center operated by the state and Brazos Bend State Park Volunteer Organization
Canyon of the Eagles Lodge and Nature Park	Burnet	Burnet	Central Texas	website, resort and nature park, located on 940 acres of Lower Colorado River Authority land, includes the Eagle Eye Observatory, nature programs
Cattail Marsh	Beaumont	Jefferson	Texas Coastal Bend	900 acres, located at Tyrrell Park, operated by the city. The area is a constructed wetland with diked cells of shallow water and mud flats. It is located along Hillebrandt Bayou
Cedar Ridge Preserve	Dallas	Dallas	North Texas	website, formerly Dallas Nature Center, 600 acres, operated by Audubon Dallas, about 9 miles of trails, butterfly gardens, live mammals, birds, insects and reptiles
Chihuahuan Desert Nature Center and Botanical Gardens	Fort Davis	Jeff Davis	Trans-Pecos	507 acres features 20-acre botanical garden, greenhouse with about 200 species of Chihuahuan Desert cacti
Cibolo Nature Center	Boerne	Kendall	Texas Hill Country	website, 100 acres
Dogwood Canyon Audubon Center	Cedar Hill	Dallas	North Texas	website, 205 acres
East Texas Ecological Education Center	Tyler	Smith	Northeast Texas	website, 82 acres, visitor center, indoor and outdoor classrooms, wetlands, grasslands and ponds
Eaton Hill Nature Center	Sonora	Sutton	Texas Hill Country	website, 37 acres
Edinburg Scenic Wetlands	Edinburg	Hidalgo	Texas Coastal Bend	website, 40 acres, part of the World Birding Center, educational exhibits on fish and aquatic life, computer programs about birds and butterflies, telescopes and interpretive audio station
Edith L. Moore Nature Sanctuary	Houston	Harris	Texas Coastal Bend	Operated by Houston Audubon, 17 acres along Rummel Creek
Fort Worth Nature Center and Refuge	Fort Worth	Tarrant	North Texas	website, 3,621 acres of forest, wetlands and prairie, operated by the City
Fredericksburg Nature Center	Fredericksburg	Gillespie	Texas Hill Country	website, 10 acres, located in Lady Bird Johnson Park
Gulf Coast Bird Observatory	Lake Jackson	Brazoria	Texas Coastal Bend	website, interpretive center and research center for public education and volunteer-based avian monitoring programs
Hana & Arthur Ginzbarg Nature Discovery Center	Bellaire	Harris	Texas Coastal Bend	website, located in 4-acre Russ Pitman Park
Heard Natural Science Museum and Wildlife Sanctuary	McKinney	Collin	North Texas	Exhibits on Texas' venomous snakes, geology, seashells and marine life, North Texas ecosystems, 289-acre wildlife sanctuary with over 6 miles of trails
Helotes Creek Nature Center	Helotes	Bexar	Central Texas	website
Houston Arboretum and Nature Center	Houston	Harris	Texas Coastal Bend	155 acres with over 5 miles of trails
Jesse H. Jones Park & Nature Center	Humble	Harris	Texas Coastal Bend	website, operated by the County, 312 acres
John Bunker Sands Wetland Center	Combine	Dallas County	North Texas	website, Private non-profit, 2,000 acres
Kleb Woods Nature Center	Tomball	Harris	Texas Coastal Bend	website, 134 acres
Lamar Bruni Vergara Environmental Science Center	Laredo	Webb	Texas Coastal Bend	website, part of Laredo Community College, contains representations of the Rio Grande ecosystem and live specimens of plant and animal life
Lewisville Lake Environmental Learning Area	Lewisville	Denton	North Texas	website, operated by the University of North Texas, Texas A&M University, the City of Lewisville, and the Lewisville Independent School District, over 2000 acres with over 7 miles of trails
Matagorda County Birding Nature Center	Bay City	Matagorda	Texas Coastal Bend	website, 34 acres
McAllen Nature Center	McAllen	Hidalgo	Rio Grande Valley	, 33 acres, two miles of trails, operated by McAllen Parks & Recreation Department, This is an important site, both for wildlife, and for people, as less than 3% of the native habitat remains in the Rio Grande Valley.
McKinney Roughs Nature Park	Bastrop	Bastrop	Central Texas	website, 1,100 acres, operated by the Lower Colorado River Authority, includes the Mark Rose Natural Science Center
Meadows Center for Water and the Environment	San Marcos	Hays	Texas Hill Country	Part of Texas State University, features glass-bottomed boat tours of the San Marcos Springs, a discovery hall and aquarium exhibit; formerly the Aquarena Center
Miller Springs Nature Center	Lake Belton	Bell	Texas Hill Country	website, A 260-acre scenic natural area located between the Leon River and nearby 40 foot high bluffs with 10.7 miles of hike and bike trails through prairie, wetlands and forests.
Mitchell Lake Audubon Center	San Antonio	Bexar	Central Texas	website, 1,200 acres including the 600-acre Mitchell Lake
National Butterfly Center	Mission	Hidalgo	Rio Grande Valley	100 acres, butterfly conservation, habitat conservation, native plant sanctuary, trails, butterfly center, and educational tours
North Texas Wildlife Center	Plano	Collin County	North Texas	North Texas Wildlife Center (NTXWC) is a nonprofit 501(c)3 organization committed to the rescue, rehabilitation, and release of local injured or orphaned wildlife.
Oso Bay Wetlands Preserve and Learning Center	Corpus Christi, Texas	Nueces County, Texas	South Texas	website
Rio Bravo Nature Center	Eagle Pass	Maverick	West Texas	website, environment of the Rio Grande
River Bend Nature Center (Texas)	Wichita Falls	Wichita	North Texas	website, 18 acres
River Legacy Nature Center	Arlington	Tarrant	North Texas	website, adjacent 1,300-acre River Legacy Parks
Riverside Nature Center	Kerrville	Kerr	Texas Hill Country	9 acres, arboretum with wildlife and native plant sanctuary, located on the Guadalupe River
Sabal Palm Sanctuary	Brownsville	Cameron	Texas Coastal Bend	Owned by the National Audubon Society and operated by the Gorgas Science Foundation, 557 acres, guided tours of the late 19th-century plantation house
San Angelo Nature Center	San Angelo	Tom Green	Edwards Plateau	website, operated by the City, collection of native animals
San Marcos Nature Center	San Marcos	Hays	Texas Hill Country	website, operated by the City in the 6-acre Crook Park, focus is the San Marcos River watershed ecosystem
Sea Center Texas	Lake Jackson	Brazoria	Texas Coastal Bend	website, marine aquarium, fish hatchery and nature center operated by Texas Parks and Wildlife Department
Shangri La Botanical Gardens and Nature Center	Orange	Orange	Texas Coastal Bend	252 acres, includes themed gardens, children's garden, wetlands demonstration garden, Victorian greenhouse, exhibit hall
Sibley Nature Center	Midland	Midland	West Texas	website, located in the 49-acre Hogan Park
Sims Bayou Urban Nature Center	Houston	Harris	Texas Coastal Bend	website, operated by Houston Audubon, 1.1 acres, includes a log cabin, barn, gazebo, boat dock and seasonal wetland trails, open by appointment
South Padre Island Birding and Nature Center	South Padre Island	Cameron	Texas Coastal Bend	website, 50 acres of dune meadows, salt marsh and intertidal flats, part of the World Birding Center
South Padre Island Dolphin Research and Sea Life Nature Center	South Padre Island	Cameron	Texas Coastal Bend	website, focus in bottlenose dolphins and their marine environment
South Texas Botanical Gardens & Nature Center	Corpus Christi	Nueces	Texas Coastal Bend	180 acres, includes a butterfly house and bromeliad conservatory
Spring Creek Greenway Nature Center	Spring	Montgomery	East Texas	website, adjacent to the 25-acre Peckinpaugh Preserve
Texas Freshwater Fisheries Center	Athens	Henderson	East Texas	website, includes a production fish hatchery, aquaria and exhibits, Texas Freshwater Fishing Hall of Fame, Richard M. Hart and Johnny Morris Conservation Center
Trinity River Audubon Center	Dallas	Dallas	North Texas	120 acres with 5 miles of trails
Twelve Hills Nature Center	Dallas	Dallas	North Texas	website, urban preserve and outdoor classroom
Valley Nature Center	Weslaco	Hidalgo	Texas Coastal Bend	6 acres, focus on getting children outdoors, environment of the lower Rio Grande Valley
Westcave Outdoor Discovery Center	Round Mountain	Travis	Texas Hill Country	website, 75 acres, exhibits on area geology, water, weather, and energy and their connection to the Preserve's plants and animals
Wildcat Bluff Nature Center	Amarillo	Potter	Texas Panhandle	website, over 600 acres, 5 miles of trails, 5 acre accessible trail with pond, spring, and paleontology exhibit. Education building, visitor center. Focus on prairie ecosystems, outdoor education, and natural and human history of the Texas Panhandle.
Wild Basin Wilderness Preserve	Austin	Travis	Texas Hill Country	227 acres with an environmental education center, operated by St. Edward's University, open to the public for trail hiking and events
