= Lutcher Theater =

Theater in Orange, Texas, USA

- Interactive map of Lutcher Theater
- Address: 707 Main Street; Orange, Texas; United States
- Coordinates: 30.09159°N 93.73596°W
- Owner: Nelda C. and H.J. Lutcher Stark Foundation
- Capacity: 1,450

Construction
- Opened: 1980

Website
- www.lutcher.org

Lutcher Theater is a privately owned, 1,450-seat, non-profit performing arts facility located at 707 Main Street in Orange, Texas. It was built in 1980 and is the largest Performing Arts Series from Houston, Texas, to New Orleans, Louisiana, with annual attendance at approximately 30,000 adults and children.

== Features ==
The six-story Lutcher Theater is the tallest building in downtown Orange. It has 1,450 seat accommodations, with 870 on the main level and 567 in the balcony. If necessary, the orchestra pit can be lowered to accommodate a 1,450-person audience. The stage itself is 45'W x 30'H x 35'10"T. The sound system is an EAW AX series system with left, right, and center clusters. The theater is handicap accessible and offers headphones for the hearing impaired.

== Performances ==
Since its opening with Liberace in February 1980, the theater has hosted many well known entertainers. It serves as a showplace for a range of performing arts productions, from traveling Broadway plays to musical groups to one man acts.

Notable performances include:

- Chris Botti
- Lyle Lovett and His Large Band
- Jim Brickman
- Marcel Marceau
- Ray Charles
- Victor Borge
- The Pirates of Penzance
- David Copperfield
- Glenn Miller Orchestra
- 42nd Street
- Biloxi Blues
- Singin' in the Rain
- The Music Man
- Sweet Charity
- Cabaret
- Shirley Jones
- Dreamgirls
- Barbara Mandrell
- Driving Miss Daisy
- Steel Magnolias
- Little Shop of Horrors
- My Fair Lady
- Lost in Yonkers
- Trisha Yearwood
- Cats
- Grease
- The Sound of Music
- West Side Story
- Fiddler on the Roof
- The King and I
- Footloose
- Tom Chapin
- Death of a Salesman
- La bohème
- Rent
- Willie Nelson
- Riverdance
- B. B. King
- Clint Black: Up Close and Personal
- Evita
- Hairspray
- Annie
- Marvin Hamlisch
- Movin’ Out
- Skillet
- Decyfer Down

== Educational programs ==
Lutcher Theater's Series for Kids is one of the largest Children's Performing Series in Texas and the largest kids’ series in the Southeast Texas area. Performances are given by National and International performing arts touring companies. The series includes popular children's shows such as Old Yeller and The Velveteen Rabbit. The performances are held during the week for students on field trips and even include a study guide so teachers can incorporate the shows into their lessons.

== The Nelda C. and H. J. Lutcher Stark Foundation ==
The Nelda C. and H.J. Lutcher Stark Foundation is a private foundation established in 1961 in Orange, Texas. It aims to improve the quality of life in Southeast Texas by encouraging, promoting, and assisting education, the arts, and health and human services. It carries out its mission through the Stark Museum of Art, the W. H. Stark House, Lutcher Theater, and Shangri La Botanical Gardens and Nature Center. These programs offer the community a rich resource for study and enjoyment of the arts, history, and nature.
