= Heard Natural Science Museum and Wildlife Sanctuary =

Nature reserve and museum in Texas, US

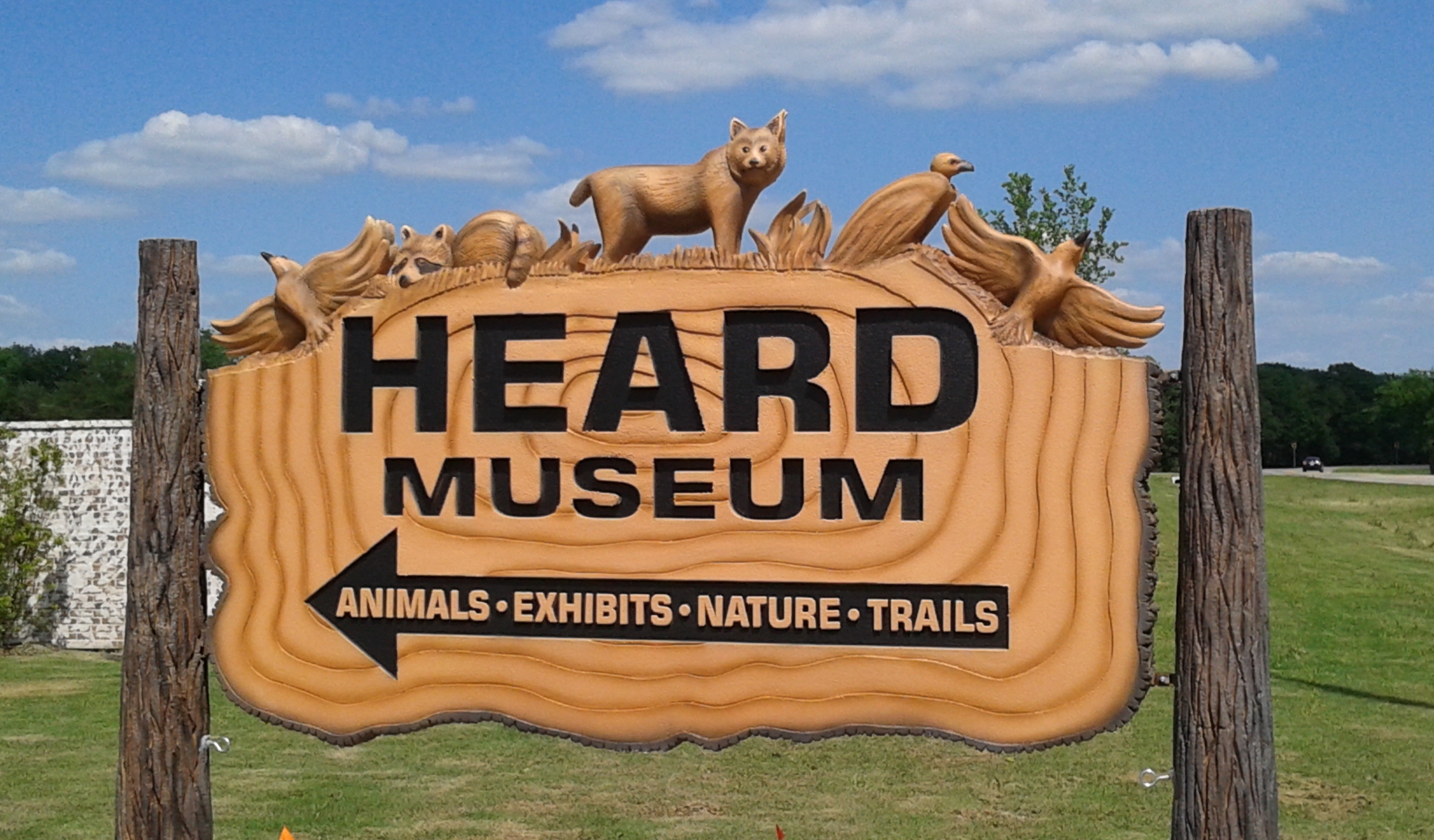
- Interactive map of Heard Natural Science Museum and Wildlife Sanctuary
- Location: Mckinney, Collin County, Texas, United States
- Coordinates: 33.1584°N 96.6153°W
- Area: 289 acres (117 ha)
- Established: 1967
- Website: www.heardmuseum.org

The Heard Natural Science Museum & Wildlife Sanctuary, located in McKinney, Texas, United States, is a private 501(c)(3) nonprofit organization founded in 1967. With a 289-acre wildlife sanctuary, five miles of hiking trails, about fifty acres of wetlands, a two-acre native plant garden, a butterfly house, live animals, indoor and outdoor exhibits, the Heard welcomes over 100,000 visitors annually. The Heard is the most popular tourist attraction in the city of McKinney. Volunteers from McKinney, Plano, Allen, Westminster, Richardson, and Dallas help keep the museum running, along with organizations like the Audubon Society, and students from the University of North Texas in Denton.

== History ==
Bessie Heard and McKinney Mayor Tom Perkins (left), March 26, 1966

Miss Bessie Heard (May 26, 1886 – 1988) was a native of McKinney, whose parents had moved to the area shortly after the American Civil War. Heard, who had a lifelong interest in the natural world, attended a local college prep school, graduated from Mary Baldwin College, and later studied at Parsons in New York. She was known for her unconventional behavior, as she was "the first woman to straddle a horse in McKinney, as well as the first female to ride a bicycle in town." She also led a drive to plant hackberry trees throughout downtown McKinney. Heard was 80 years old when she saw the need to preserve a place where future generations could visit to experience nature. The museum opened October 1, 1967, and now serves more than 100,000 visitors annually. One of the original missions of the museum was hosting Heard's "large and unusual collection of bird and flower prints." She had previously exhibited her prints and collections of shells, minerals and butterflies at an informal "sun-porch museum" at her home.

The original museum building was designed by Pat Y. Spillman. The first director was Howard E. Laughlin. The museum was expanded by 8,000 square feet in 1991. The museum hosted a raptor center until 2004, which provided rehabilitation services to approximately 100 sick or injured wild raptors annually.

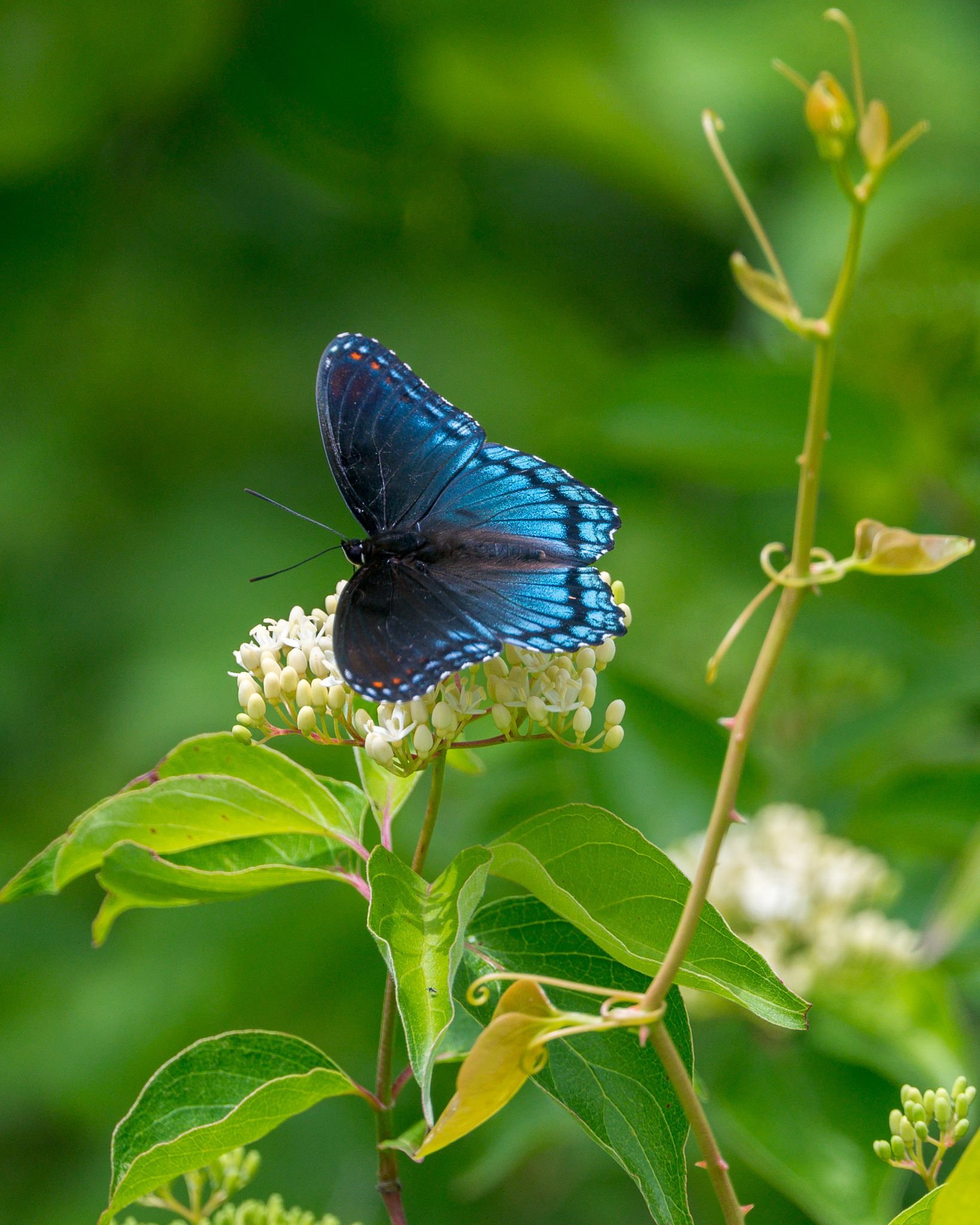
Red-spotted admiral butterfly, native to North America, photographed at the Heard

The sanctuary was originally established on 207.4 acres south of the McKinney Country Club. A local landfill abuts another boundary of the sanctuary. Wilson Creek, which feeds nearby Lake Lavon, forms the northern boundary. Beginning in 2005, the museum collaborated with the country club to change their landscaping so it was more diverse and richer in Texas native species. As of 1992 the sanctuary supported 240 animal species and 200 plant species living in riparian and prairie habitats. The geofenced iNaturalist project for the Heard Museum has indexed over 2,000 species of wildlife as of 2024.

A wetland was created adjacent to Wilson Creek in 1991. The Heard preserves a native prairie subtype known as Texas blackland prairie. The Texas Blackland Prairie Chapter of the Texas Master Naturalist program holds training programs at the Heard for residents of Collin, Hunt, and Rockwall counties.

The Heard's purpose is threefold: education, conservation, and preservation.

== Main attractions ==
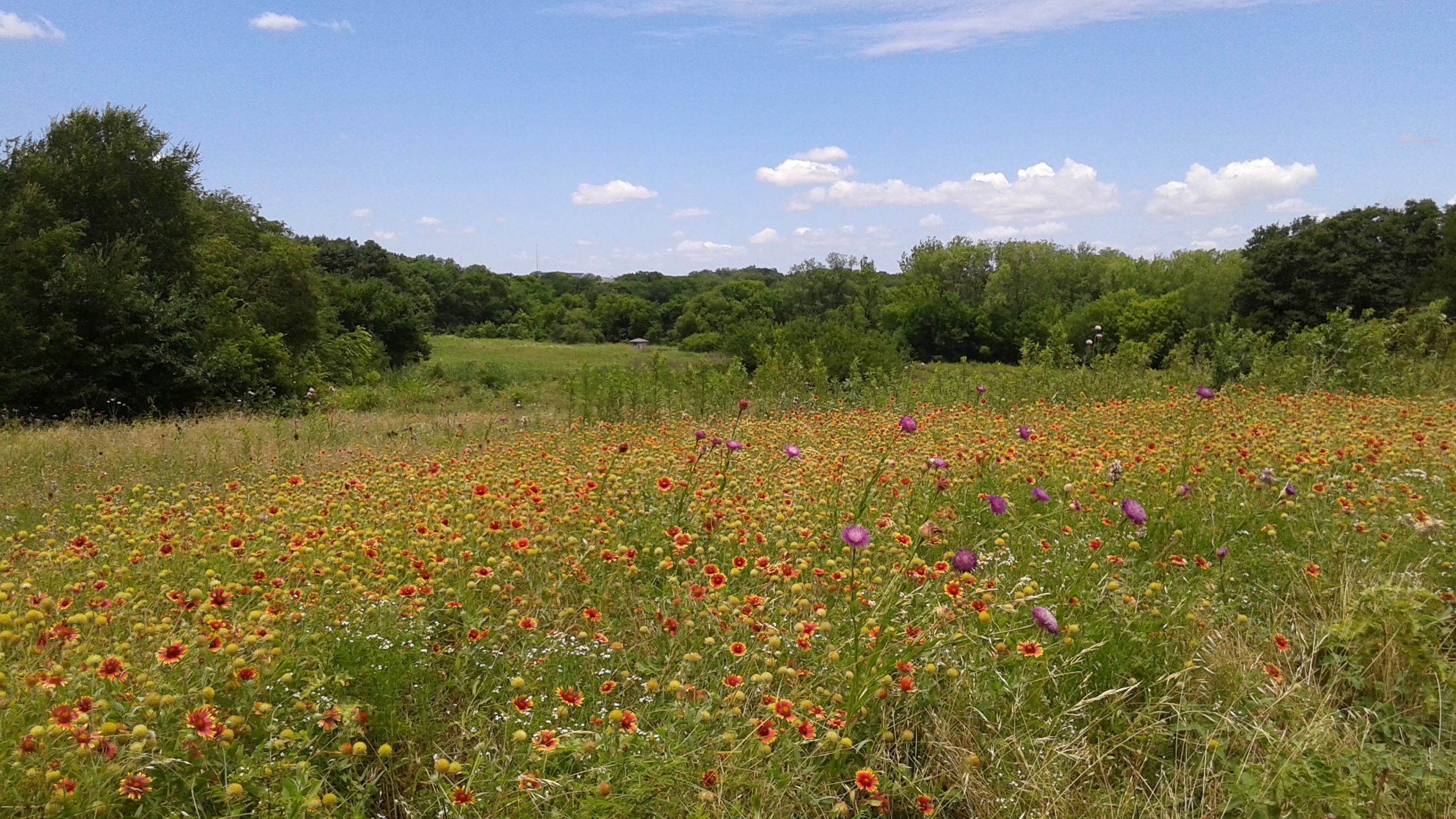
Prairie at the Heard

Within the 289-acre wildlife sanctuary, visitors can explore trails, sit in on educational programs, and get their hands dirty with conservation projects. The Heard sanctuary has five habitats including Blackland prairie, wetlands, bottomland forest, upland forest and white rock escarpment. The habitat at the Heard protects native North American grasses that have become increasingly rare due to development and agriculture. Ken Steigman, director of Lewisville Lake Environmental Learning Area in Denton County, first learned about habitat restoration while working at the Heard: "That seven-foot tall groundcover was big bluestem. Its roots went down 15 feet. We still find remnants of it here and there. A lot of this area was what ecologists call Blackland Prairie, a native Texas ecosystem."

The Heard has been awarded The Audubon Society's designation as an important birding area. Texas has preeminence as a bird-watching area due to its placement on major migratory paths. However, The Heard offers special opportunities for bird-watching by providing a unique resource in a large metropolitan area. The Prairie and Timbers Audubon Society meets at the Heard.

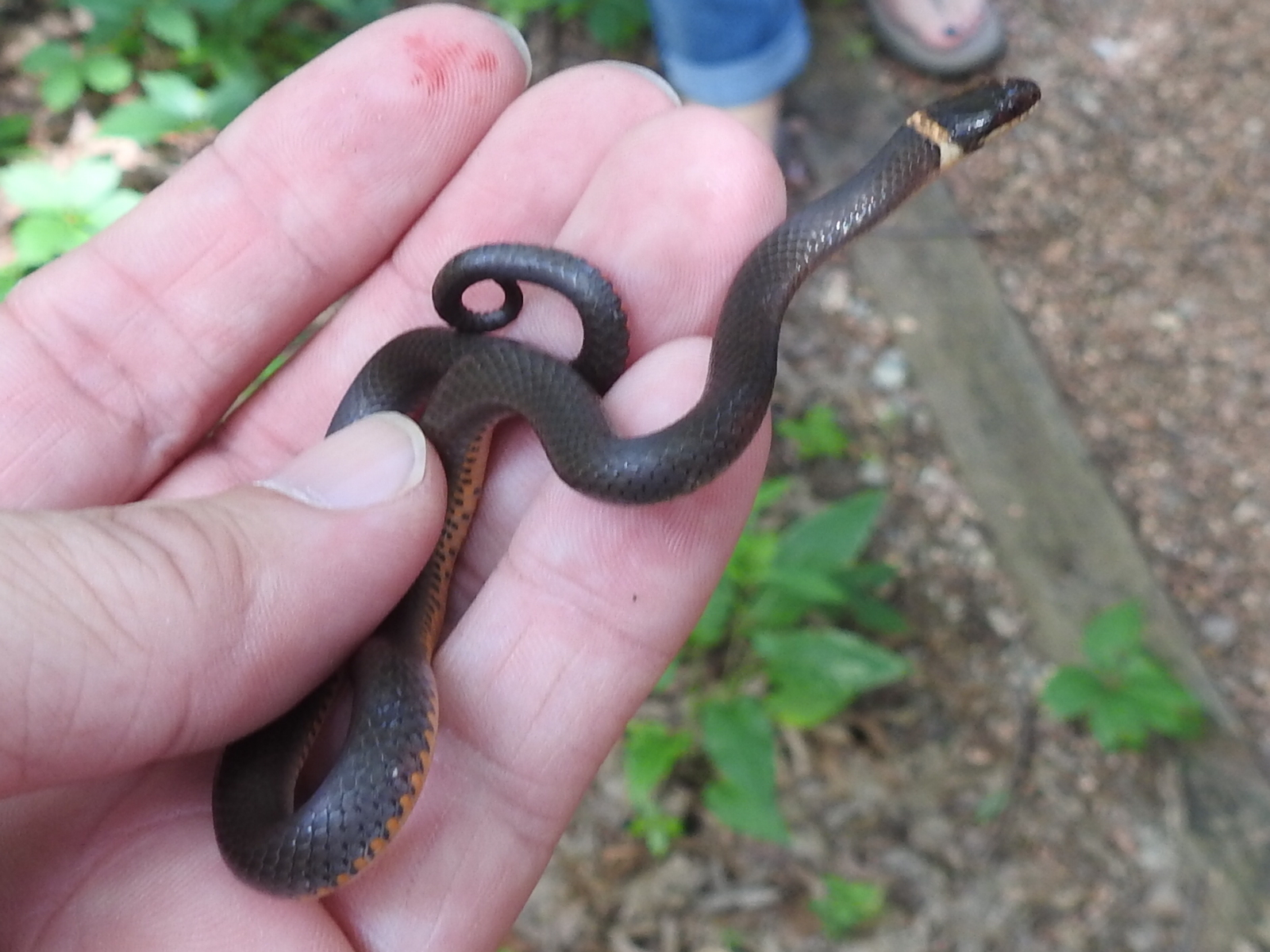
Prairie ringneck snake found at Heard during "nature walk and iNaturalist demonstration"

There is a demonstration garden showcasing Texas wildflowers, and the North Texas chapter of the Texas Native Plant Society holds its monthly meetings at the museum. The Heard has hosted a popular spring native plant sale since 1989.

Also, the Heard's Pioneer Village features eight buildings in miniature scale that emulate structures that would have been typical in prairie settlements in the late 1800s.

== Outdoor exhibits ==
- Animal Encounter Trail
- Native Plant Garden
- Butterfly Garden
- Native Texas Butterfly House (active in summer)
- Dinosaurs Live! Life-Size Animatronic Dinosaurs (September- February; visit website for complete dates)
- Pioneer Village

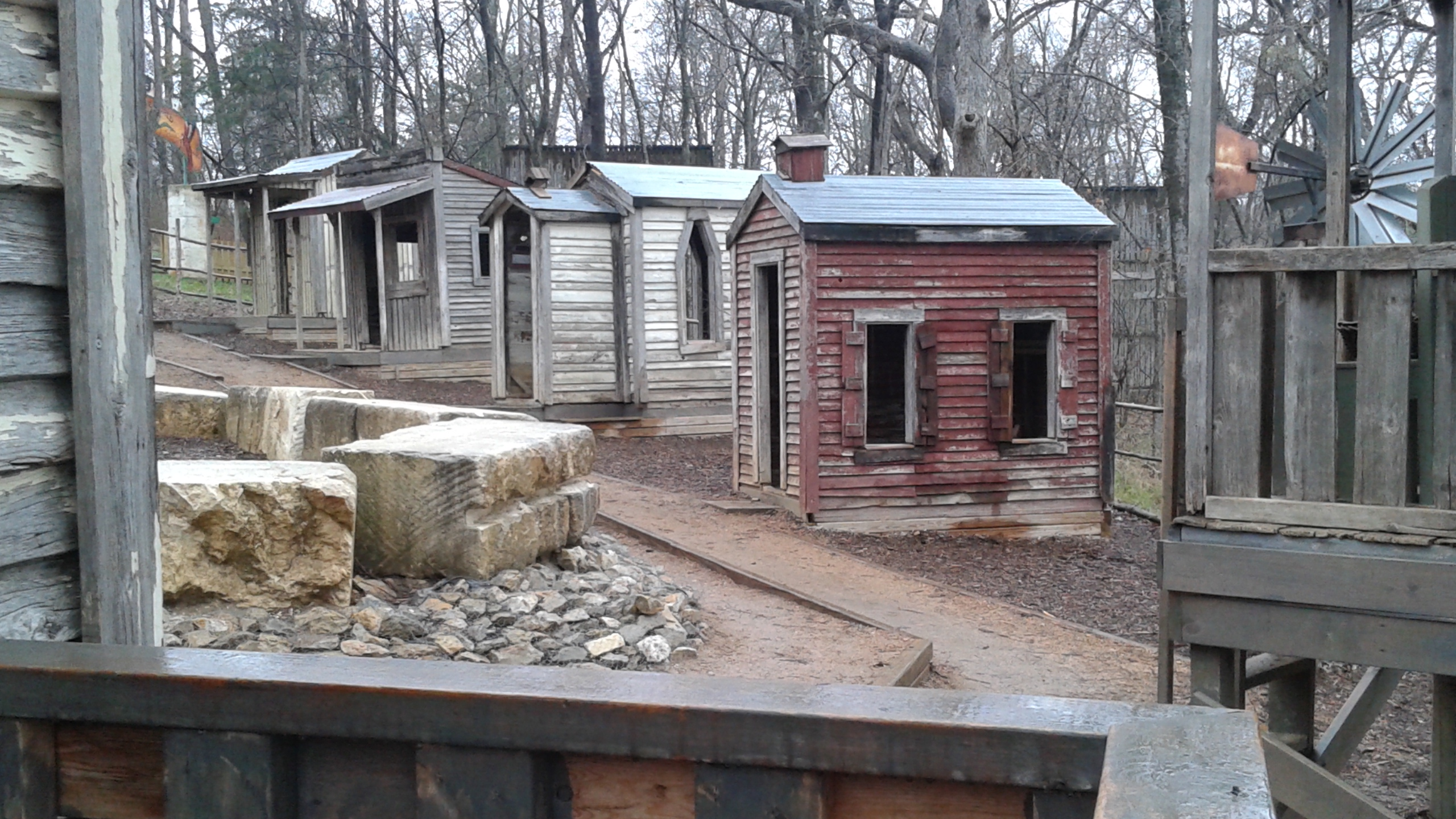
Pioneer Village

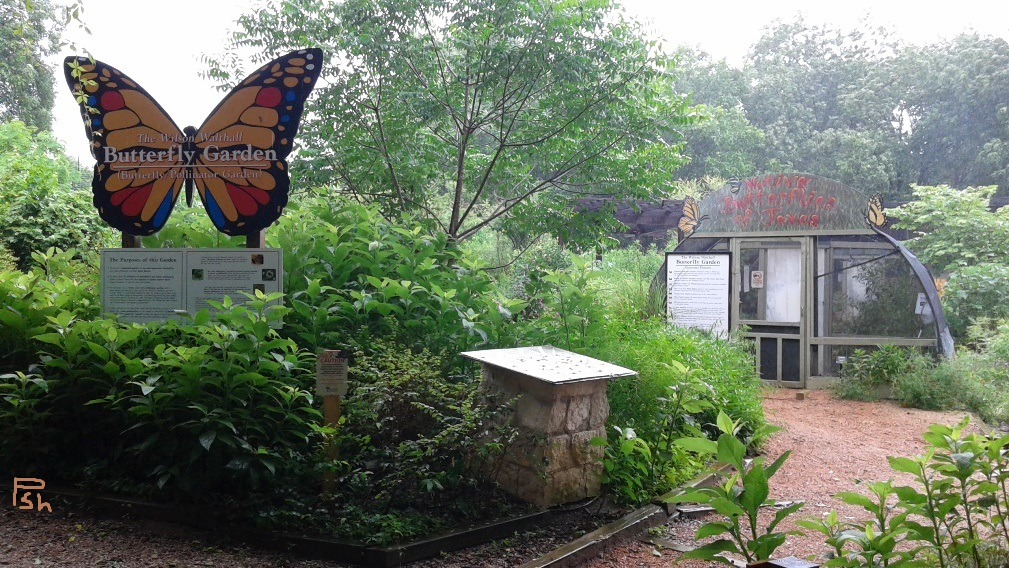
Butterfly House and Garden

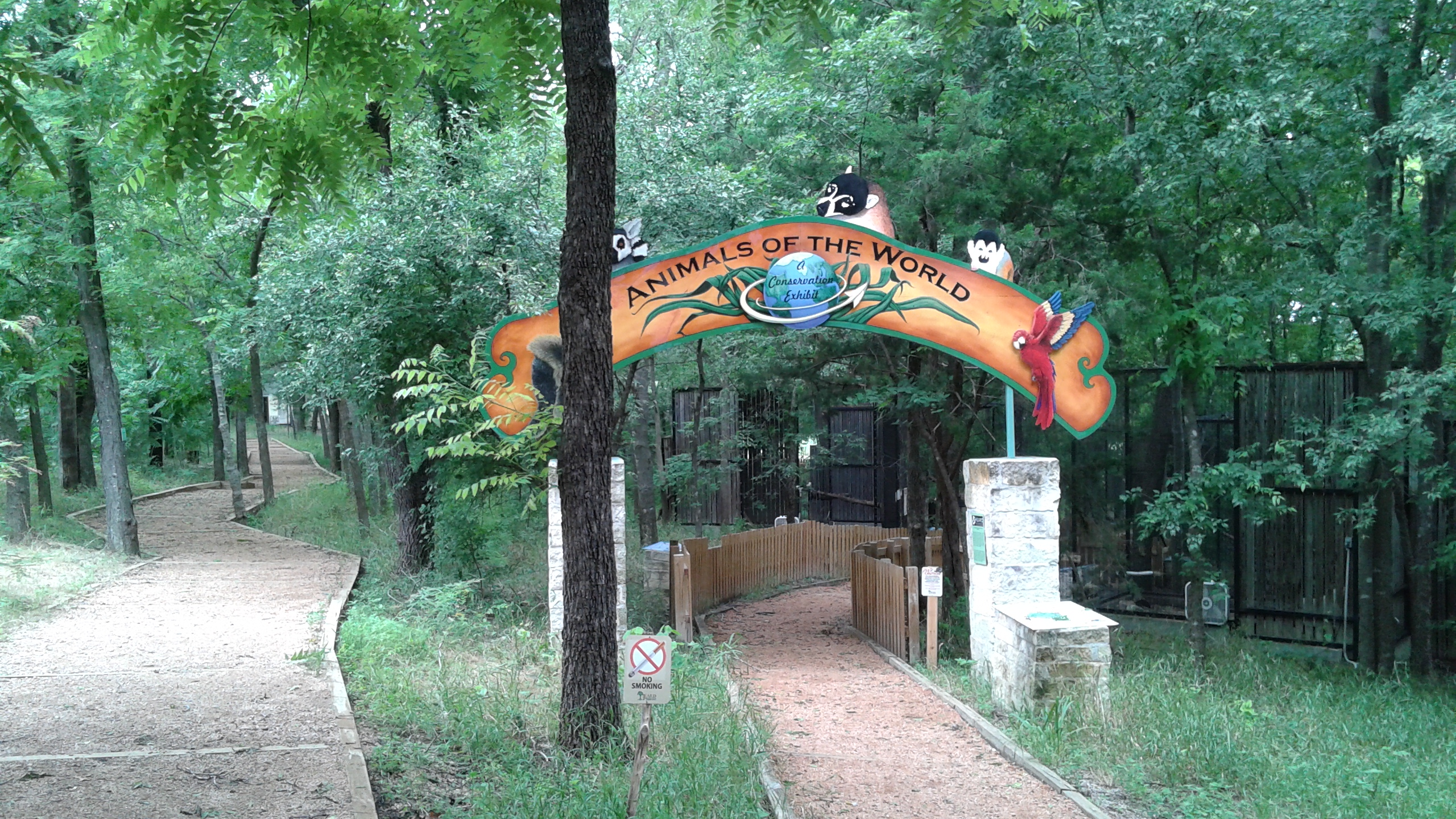
Animals of the World

== Indoor exhibits ==
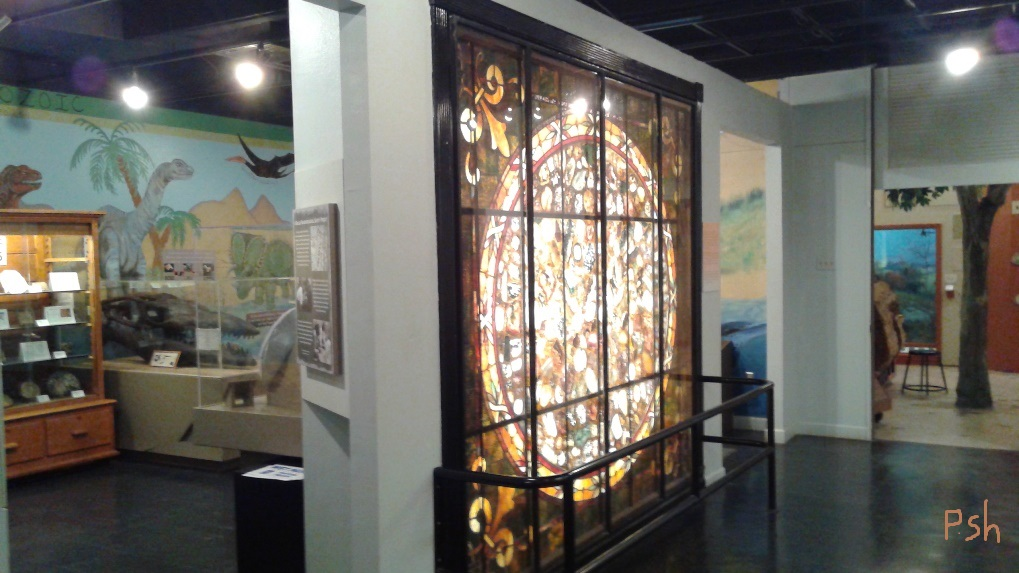
Indoor exhibits

- Native Texas Snakes
- Mosasaur Exhibit
- Living Lab (some dioramas of the major ecosystems found at the Heard, a working observation bee hive, native fish, etc.)
- Marine Shell Room
- Project Passenger Pigeon

== Programs and activities ==
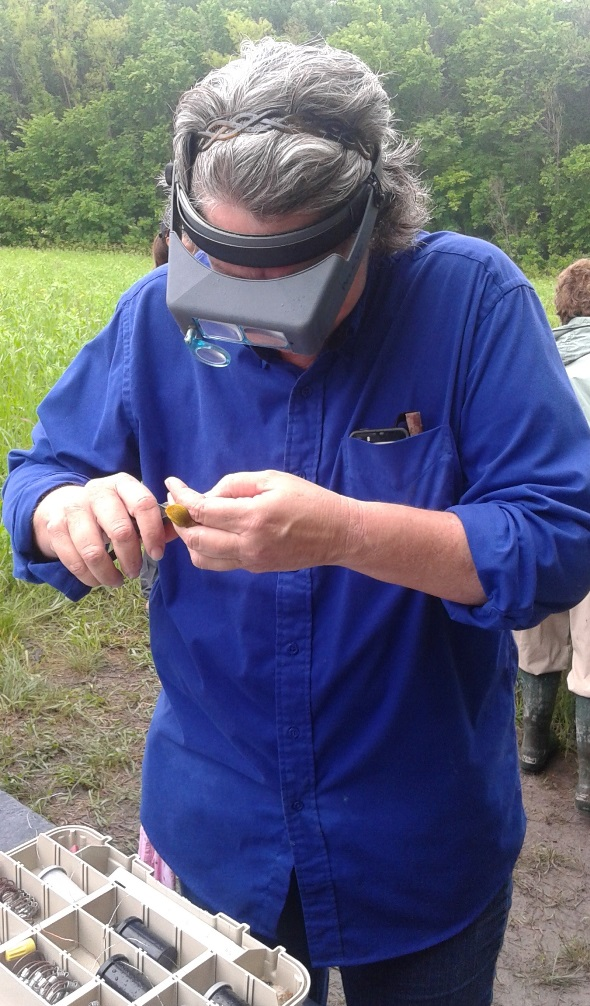
Heard Bird Banding Station

- Hiking on six nature trails; more than 5 miles
- EcoAdventures; Canoeing at the Heard Wetlands
- Scouting Workshops
- Second Saturday Bird Walk
- Night Hikes
- Bird Banding Station; established in 1978 and is the oldest bird-banding station in the state of Texas
- Education programs
- Field trips
- Summer Camps
- Programs for Kids
- Volunteer programs

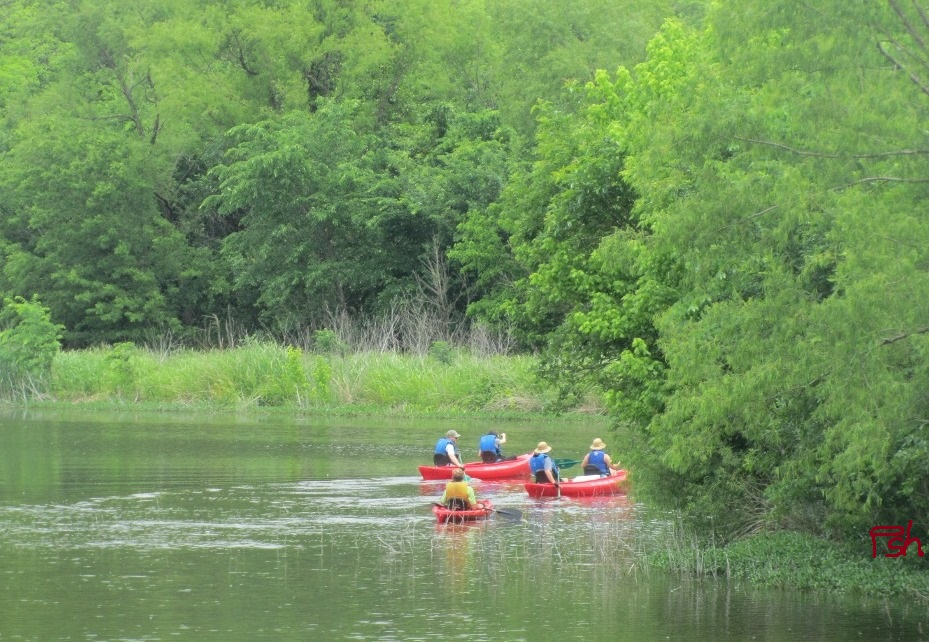
Canoeing at the Heard

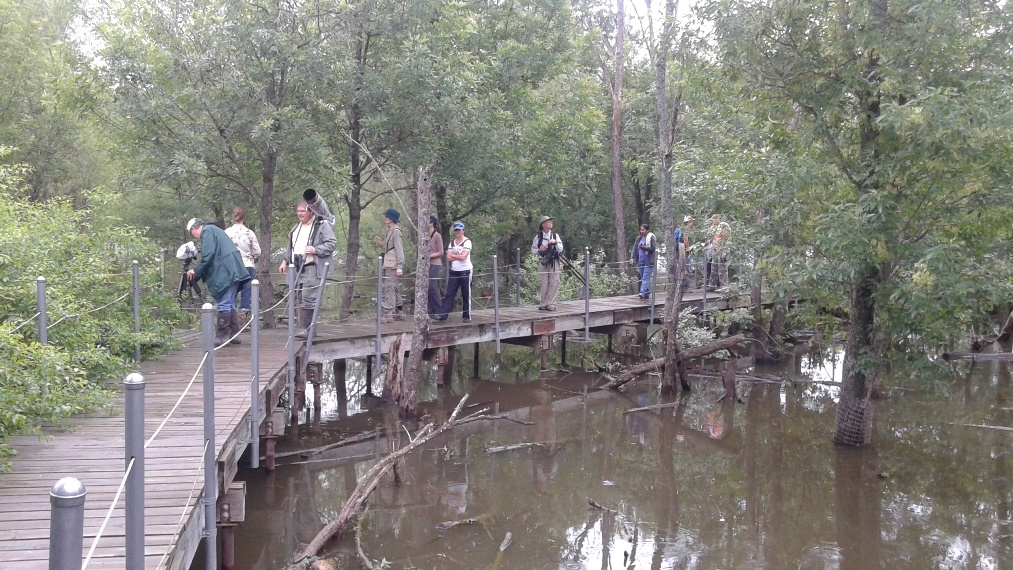
Board Walk on the Wood Duck Trail

== Events and festivals ==
Holidays at the Heard

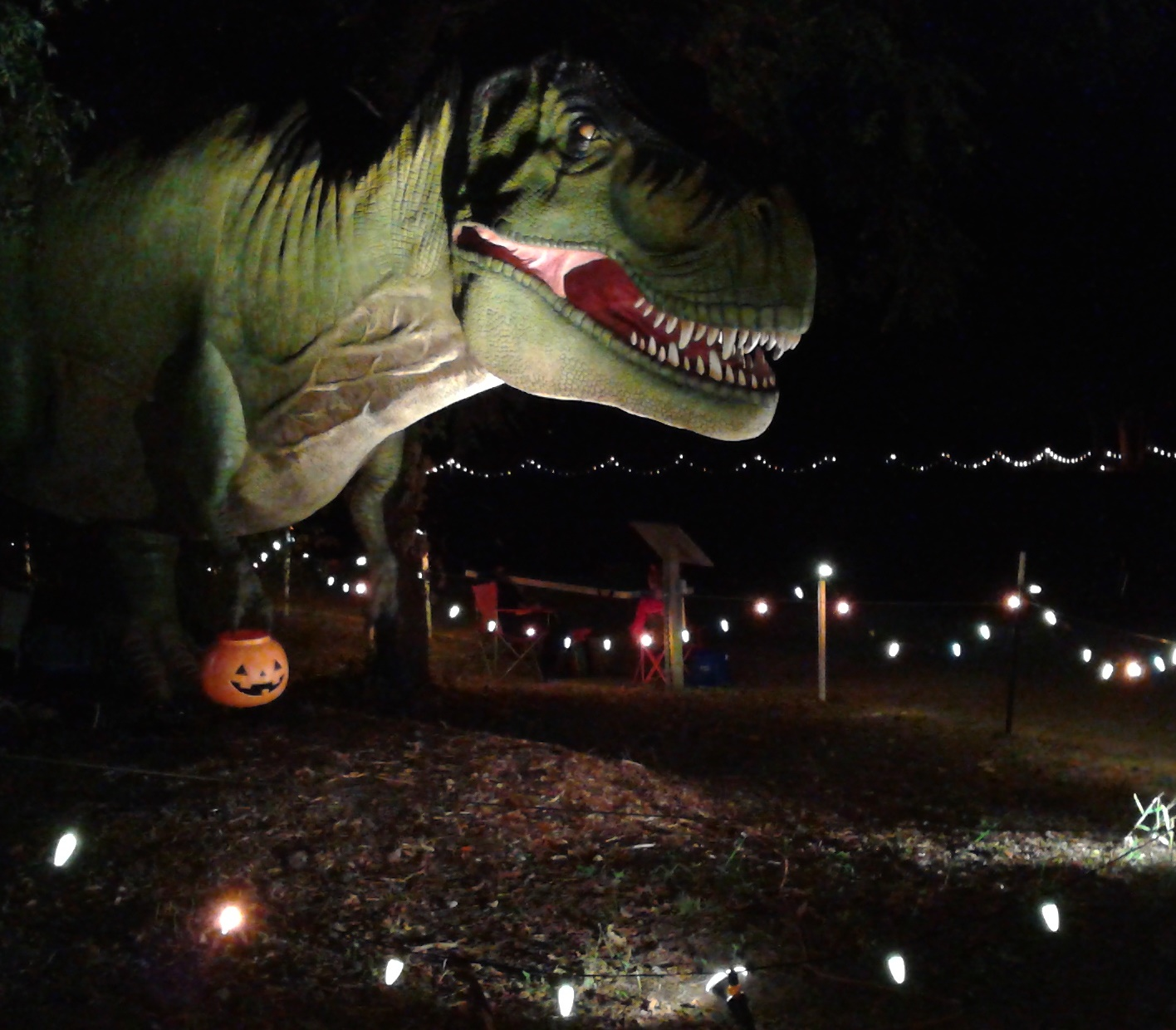
Halloween with Dinosaurs

The annual Holidays at the Heard event, in December, is one of the holiday lighting displays in North Texas.

Halloween at the Heard

The annual Halloween at the Heard is a family-friendly Halloween event.

Date Night at the Heard

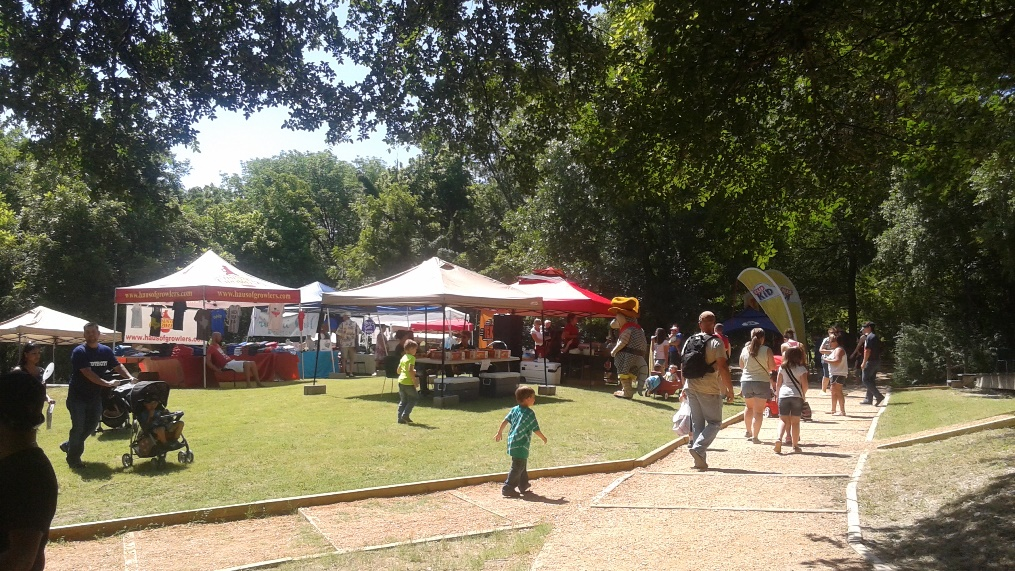
An event at the Heard

Date Night at the Heard is an outdoor fundraising event featuring live music, dancing, a cash bar and food trucks. The event is for guests ages 21+.

Annual Heard Nature Photography Contest

The Heard Nature Photographers Club was established in 1981. The Heard Nature Photographers Club meets the 2nd Saturday of each month at the Heard Natural Science Museum.

== See also ==
- List of nature centers in Texas
- List of museums in North Texas
- McKinney, Texas
- Collin County, Texas
- Perot Museum of Nature and Science
- Fort Worth Museum of Science and History
