= One Moody Plaza =

- U.S. National Register of Historic Places
- Recorded Texas Historic Landmark
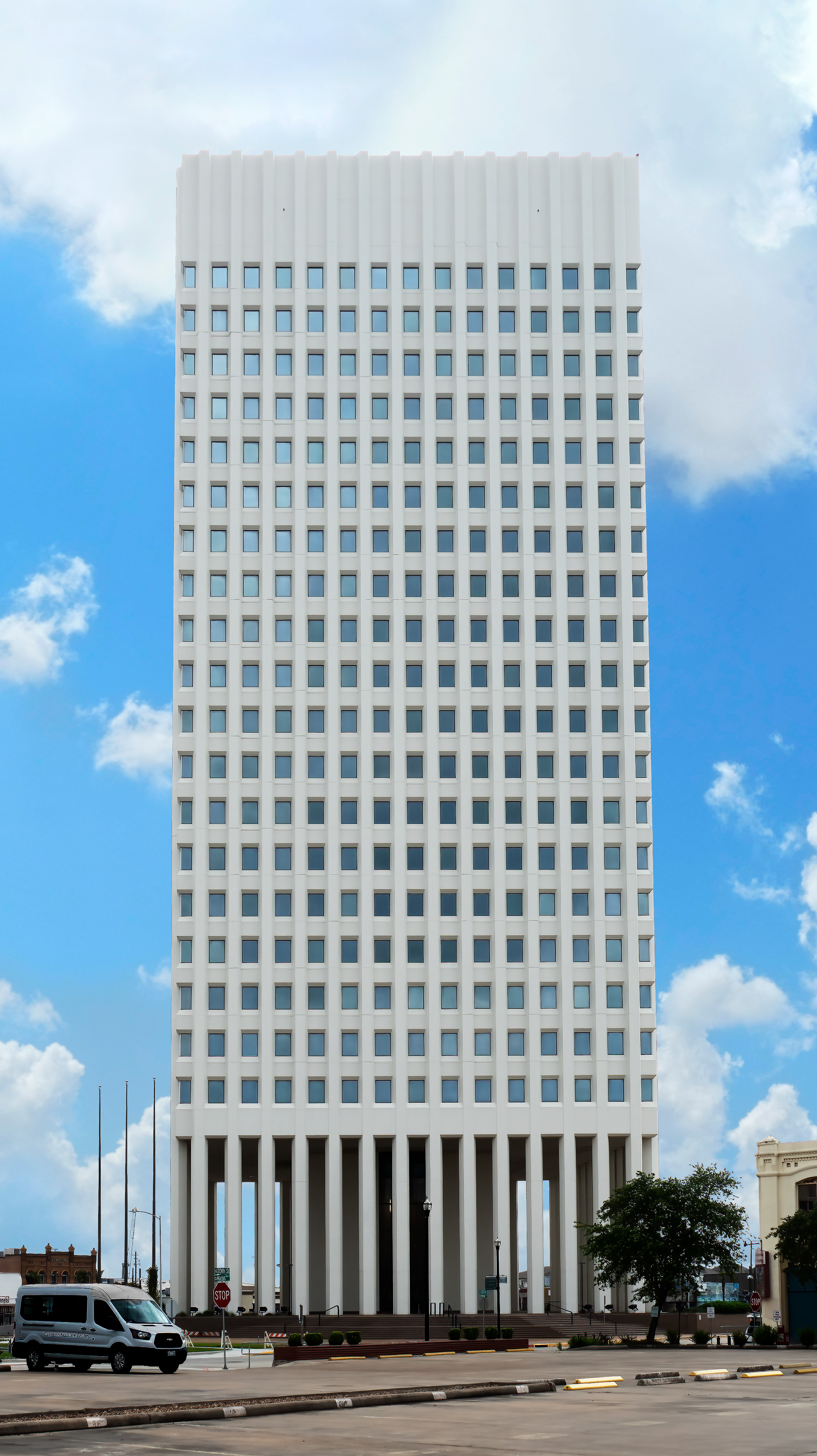
- One Moody Plaza

- Location within Texas Location within the United States
- Location: One Moody Plaza (1902 Market Street); Galveston, Texas
- Coordinates: 29.307°N 94.7899°W
- Area: 1.79 acres (0.72 ha)
- Built: 1972
- Architect: Neuhaus & Taylor
- NRHP reference No.: 100006539

Significant dates
- Added to NRHP: May 20, 2021
- Designated RTHL: 2021

One Moody Plaza is a 23 floor skyscraper at 1902 Market Street in Downtown Galveston, Texas, United States. The building was designed by the architectural firm of Neuhaus & Taylor. At its completion in 1972, One Moody Plaza was the tallest building in Galveston County, standing 357.6 feet (109 m) tall, but was surpassed by the Palisade Palms Condominiums, built in 2008 with 27 floors and standing at a height of 381 feet. The building was listed on the National Register of Historic Places in 2021.

The American National Insurance Company, one of the top 100 largest companies in the Houston area, was headquartered in this building until June of 2026.They are now based in Houston.

== American National Insurance Company ==
One Moody Plaza is also known as the American National Insurance Company Building, named for a company founded by William Lewis Moody in 1905. The insurance company employed 70 people in its Galveston office by 1912, a number that increased to 500 by 1928, when it had already acquired 27 other insurance companies. American National Insurance Company acquired Commonwealth Life and Accident Insurance of St. Louis in 1950.

== 1972 building ==
The building opened in 1972 and remained the tallest building in Galveston until 2007 when two condominium towers were completed nearby. At one time the 20th floor housed an observation deck, open to the general public. However, in the 1990s, it was closed due to security and liability concerns.

A total of 395 migratory birds died in a single day after crashing in to the building in 2017 during a lightning storm. An agreement was made with the Edith L. Moore Nature Sanctuary to turn off building lights at night during the migration season.

== See also ==
- List of National Historic Landmarks in Texas
- National Register of Historic Places listings in Galveston County, Texas
