= W. H. Stark House =

Historic house in Texas, United States

- U.S. National Register of Historic Places
- Recorded Texas Historic Landmark
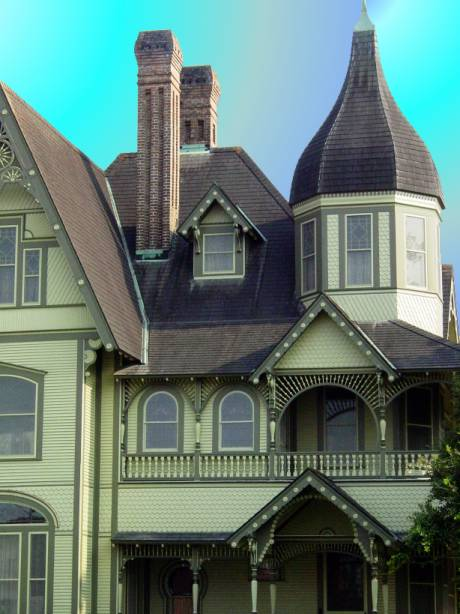
- Stark House in 2006

- Location within Texas Location within the United States
- Interactive map showing the location of W.H. Stark House
- Location: 611 W. Green Ave., Orange, Texas
- Coordinates: 30°5′34″N 93°44′7″W
- Area: 1 acre (0.40 ha)
- Built: 1894
- Architectural style: Queen Anne, Queen Anne-Eastlake
- Website: The W.H. Stark House
- NRHP reference No.: 76002056
- RTHL No.: 11519

Significant dates
- Added to NRHP: December 12, 1976
- Designated RTHL: 1976

The W.H. Stark House is a fully restored, 14,000-square-foot (1,300 m^{2}) Victorian home located on the corner between Green Avenue and Sixth Street in Orange, Texas.

== History ==
The W.H. Stark House was home to William Henry and Miriam Lutcher Stark, who spent a lifetime collecting rare and unique decorative objects. Miriam Melissa Lutcher moved to Orange with her parents, Henry Jacob Lutcher and Frances Ann Lutcher, in the late 1870s. Henry Jacob Lutcher was co-owner of the Lutcher and Moore Lumber Company. He and his wife Frances began a philanthropic dynasty that continues to benefit the Orange community today.

In 1881 Miriam M. Lutcher married William Henry Stark, who made his fortune in banking, oil, rice, insurance, and the regional timber industry. They moved into their home in 1894 and occupied it until 1936. They were passionate collectors. Their son H.J. Lutcher Stark grew up influenced by their lifetime dedication to philanthropy and the arts.

When the Stark family moved into their new home, W.H. Stark was forty-three, Miriam was thirty-five, and their son Lutcher was seven. They were the only family to inhabit the house. When W.H. and Miriam Stark died in 1936, Lutcher Stark closed the house. It was vacant until 1970 when restoration began. Restoration to the era of 1894 continued for ten years, and the house was opened as a house museum for public tours on February 10, 1981.

== Architecture and decorative highlights ==
Construction on The W.H. Stark House began on June 29, 1893, with completion in 1894. The house is classified in the Queen Anne architectural style, which is characterized by long sloping roofs, second floor balconies, Jacobean chimneys, wide verandas, and octagonal or round towers.

Interior ceilings are 12 feet (3.7 m) high on the first floor, 11 feet (3.4 m) high on the second floor, and 10 1/2 feet (3.2 m) high on the third floor. Exterior walls are ten inches (25 cm) thick, with two layers of diagonal storm sheeting. Interior double walls are sixteen inches (41 cm) thick. The floor plan is duplicated on two of the three stories, and includes a concrete basement, which is unique in Southeast Texas.

Cypress was chosen as the basic material because of the damp conditions in the area. Longleaf yellow pine was used for the intricate design work. Turned pieces were formed on a foot-operated machine lathe, and each board had to be cut and measured for a precise fit. All framework was selected from the Lutcher and Moore Lumber Mills.

The 14,000-square-foot (1,300 m^{2}) home today is furnished much as it was in the 1920s, with fifteen rooms and three stories of original family furniture, carpets, silver, antique porcelains, and American Brilliant Period cut glass. The ceiling in the Music Room is oil painted on canvas by artist E. Theo Behr; it features an allegorical scene with cherubs. The house also holds many unique objects, including a one-of-a-kind sterling silver Gorham Manufacturing Company tea service in the Louis XVI style, a rare copy of the Napoleon death mask, and decorative silver and china.

The W.H. Stark House is listed in the National Register of Historic Places and is designated a Recorded Texas Historic Landmark by the Texas Historical Commission.

== The Nelda C. and H.J. Lutcher Stark Foundation ==
The W.H. Stark House is owned and operated by the Nelda C. and H.J. Lutcher Stark Foundation, a private, non-profit foundation established in 1961 in Orange, Texas. It aims to improve the quality of life in Southeast Texas by encouraging, promoting, and assisting education, the arts, and health and human services. It carries out its mission through the Stark Museum of Art, The W.H. Stark House, Shangri La Botanical Gardens and Nature Center, and Lutcher Theater. These programs offer the community a rich resource for study and enjoyment of arts, history, nature and culture.

== Controversy ==
Lutcher Stark died in 1965 leaving a $73 million fortune behind to his third wife Nelda and the Nelda C. and H.J. Lutcher Stark Foundation. The Stark family was unhappy with his decision and in 1987 hired Houston attorney Michael Gallagher. He was able to ascertain that Lutcher Stark committed fraud by undervaluing his first wife Nita's estate to get out of paying death taxes. Despite Gallagher's attempts, the case never went anywhere.

Nelda Stark died in 1999 and left $150 million to the Stark Foundation. Heirs from one of two adopted sons of Lutcher Stark and his first wife Nita, hired Louisiana attorney L. Clayton Burgess. There was question about Judge Buddie. J. Hahn, who presided over the 1989 case, and his ability to be impartial. Burgess was able to show a connection between Hahn and one of Nelda's lawyers. There was also proof that the Stark Foundation gave $673,000 to a college where Hahn sat on the board.

Attorney John Cash Smith represented the Nelda Stark estate and dismissed the charges. He cited a Texas Supreme Court ruling that held a settlement is valid despite later fraud claims.

== See also ==
- National Register of Historic Places listings in Orange County, Texas
- Recorded Texas Historic Landmarks in Orange County
- Stark Museum of Art
