= Perot Museum of Nature and Science =

- Established: 2006
- Location: Dallas, Texas, United States
- Coordinates: 32.78689°N 96.80665°W
- Type: Science museum, natural history museum
- Visitors: 1,000,000+
- CEO: Dr. Linda Abraham-Silver
- Public transit access: DART/TRE: Victory station, M-Line: St Paul & McKinney
- Website: perotmuseum.org/

The Perot Museum of Nature and Science (shortened to Perot Museum) is a natural history and science museum in Dallas, Texas, in Victory Park. The museum was named in honor of Margot and Ross Perot. The chief executive officer of the museum is Dr. Linda Abraham-Silver.

== Background ==
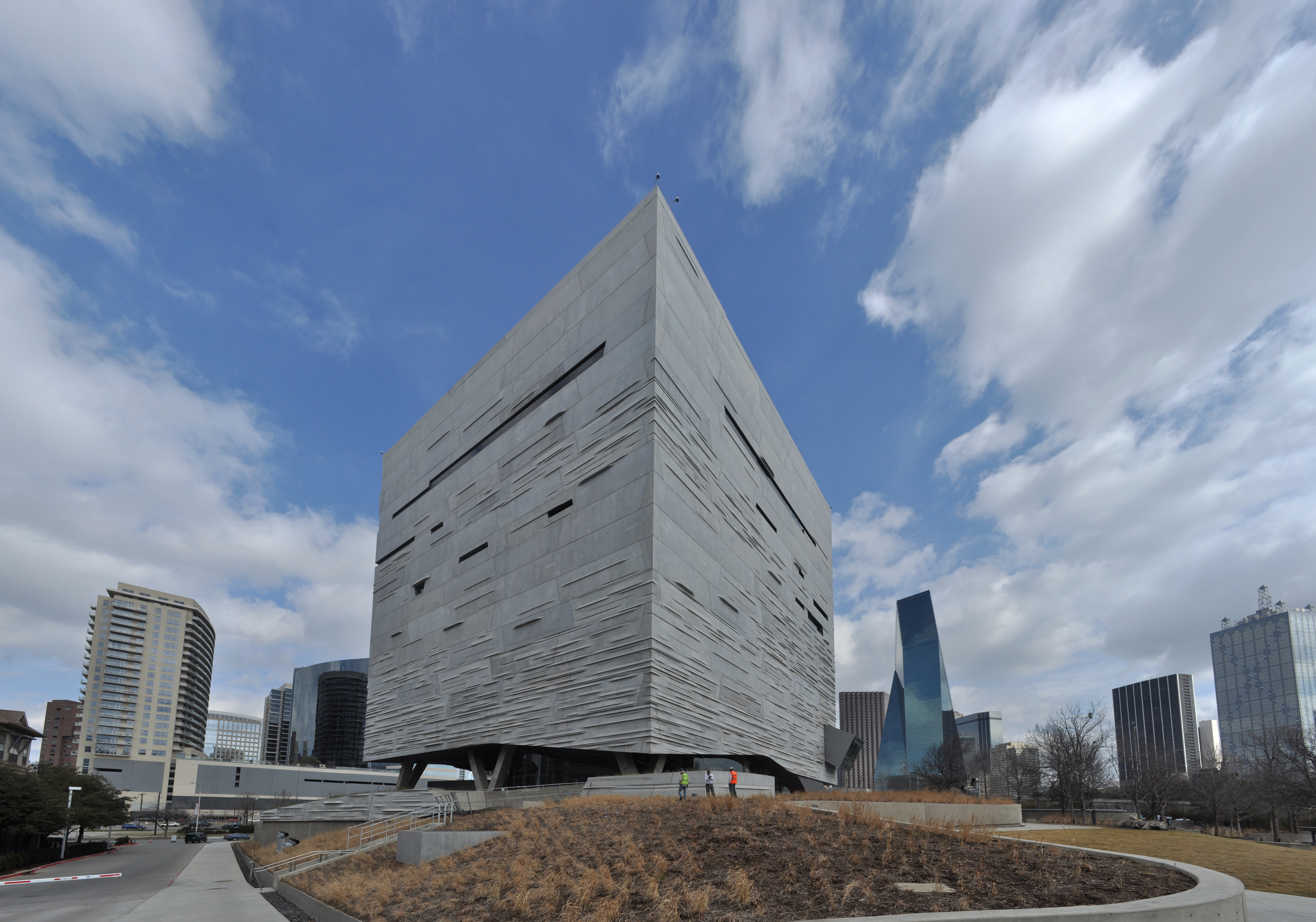
Victory Park building in February 2013.

=== History ===
On June 6, 1936, the Dallas Museum of Natural History opened to the public as part of the Texas Centennial Exposition. On September 20, 1946, the Dallas Health Museum was founded by a group chartered as the Dallas Academy of Medicine. It was renamed the Dallas Health and Science Museum in 1958. The name was changed yet again to the Science Place in 1981. In 1995, the Dallas Children's Museum was founded elsewhere.

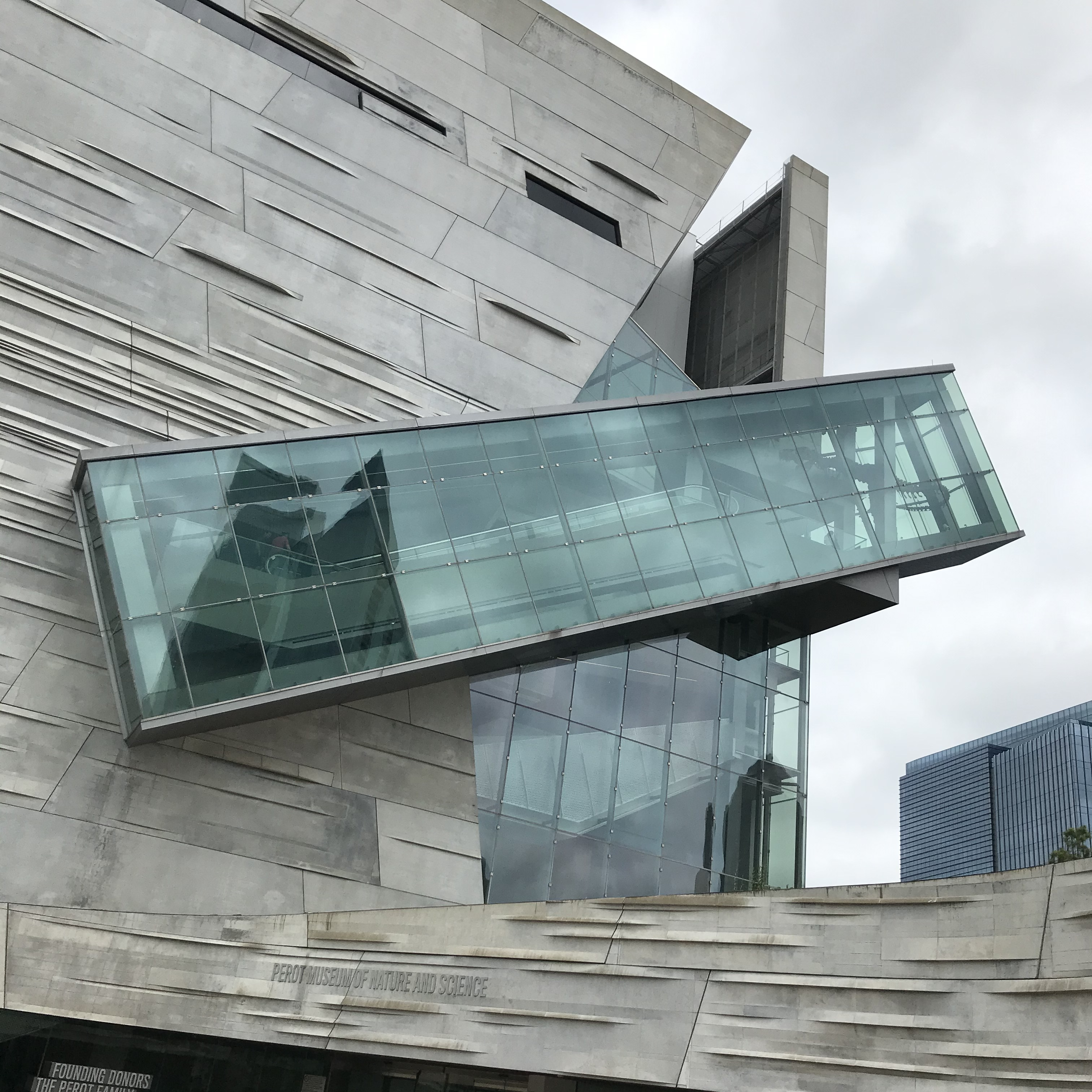
An exterior view of the museum's main staircase

In 2006, Perot Museum CEO Nicole Small oversaw the uniting of the Dallas Museum of Natural History, the Science Place, and the Dallas Children's Museum at Fair Park. Following the merger, the museum was in three buildings there, featuring an IMAX-style theater, a planetarium, an extensive exhibit hall, and its own paleontology lab. The museum moved on December 1, 2012, to a new facility in Victory Park.

On June 1, 2014, CEO Small was replaced by Colleen Walker.

Walker resigned as CEO in 2017, and was replaced in 2017 by Linda Abraham-Silver.

=== Donation and endowment ===
The Victory Park campus museum was named in honor of Margot and Ross Perot as the result of a $50,000,000 gift made by their adult children Ross Perot, Jr., Nancy Perot Mulford, Suzanne Perot McGee, Carolyn Perot Rathjen, and Katherine Perot Reeves. The $185,000,000 fundraising goal, slated to provide for the site acquisition, exhibition planning and design, construction of the new building, education programs and an endowment, was achieved by November 2011, more than a year before the museum's scheduled opening in December 2012. The donated funds enabled the museum to be built, incurring no debt or public funding.

== Victory Park campus ==
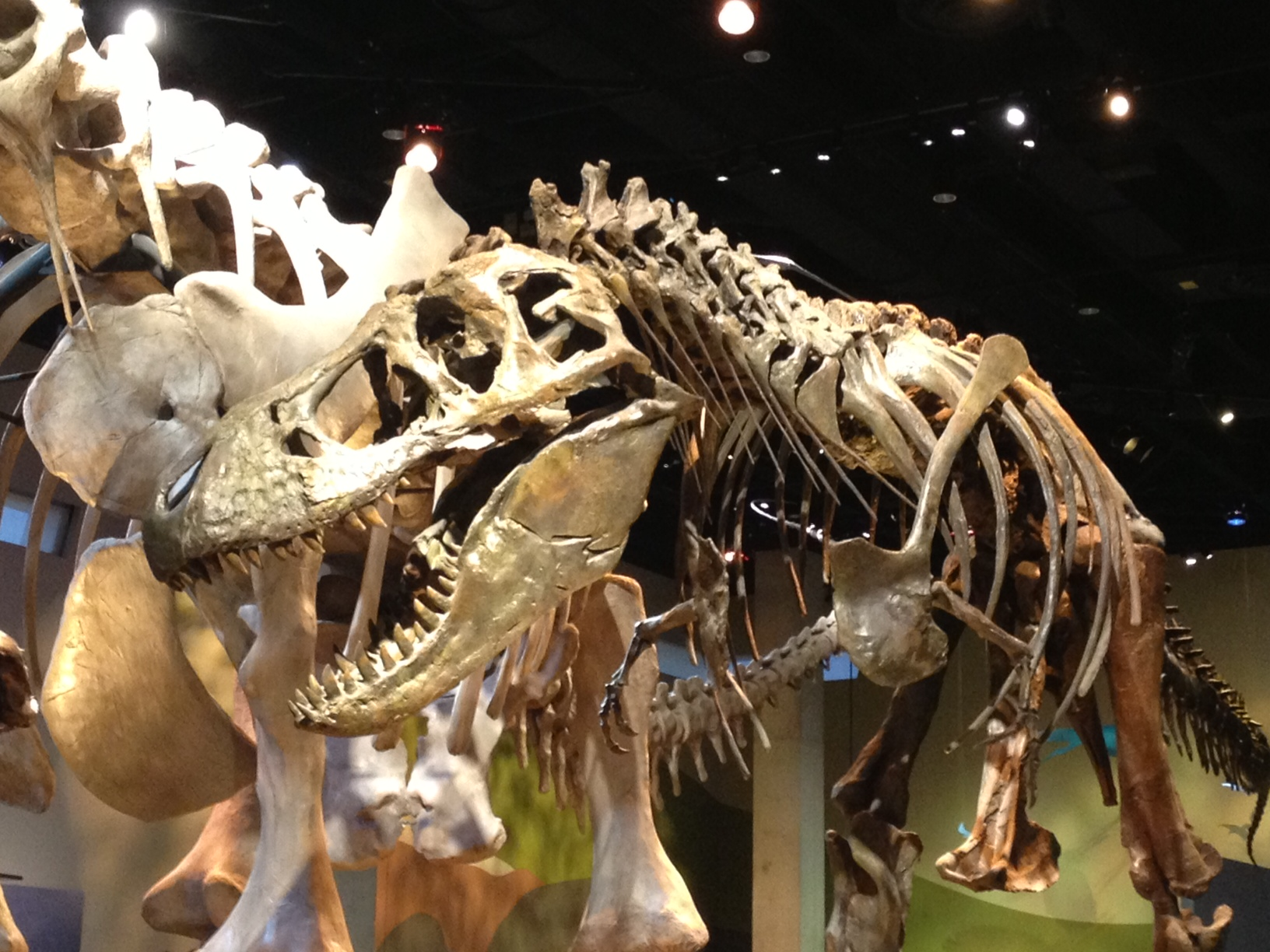
Cast skeleton of Tyrannosaurus rex in Life Then and Now hall

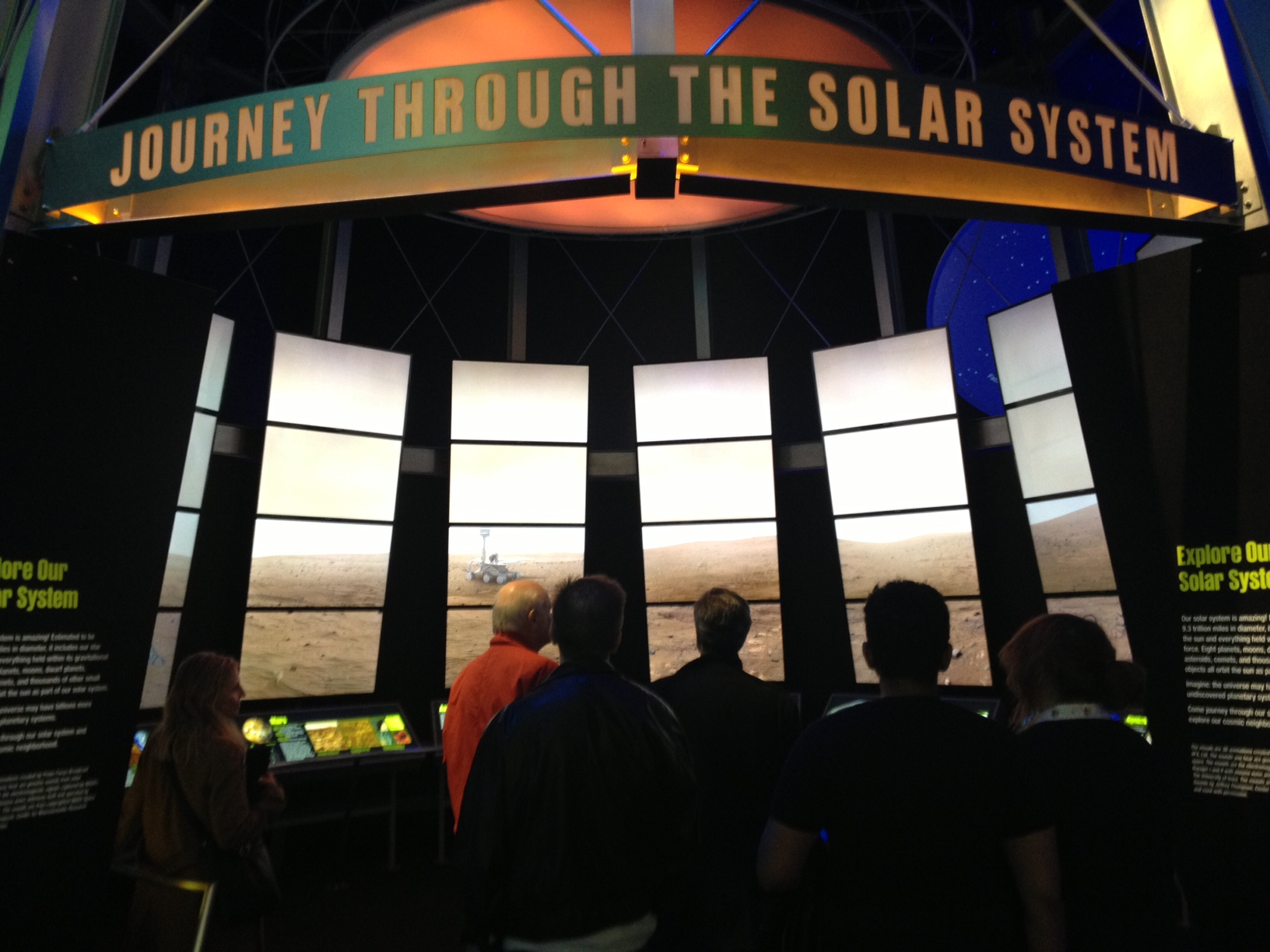
Journey Through The Solar System exhibit at the Expanding Universe hall

The 180,000-square-foot (17,000 m^{2}) facility has six floors and stands about 14 stories high. Five of the floors are accessible to the public and house 11 permanent exhibit halls as well as 6 learning labs. The top floor houses the museum's administration offices. The Victory Park campus opened its doors to the public on December 1, 2012. Approximately 6,000 visitors came to the museum on its first day of operation.

=== Building design ===
Designed by Thom Mayne of Morphosis Architects, the building was conceived as a large cube floating over a landscaped plinth (or base).

The stone roof, which features a landscape of drought-tolerant greenery, was inspired by Dallas surroundings. The plinth was landscaped with a 1-acre (0.40 ha) rolling green roof comprising rock and native drought-resistant grasses that reflects Texas' indigenous landscape and demonstrate a living system that will evolve naturally. Building on the museum's commitment to resource conservation, the new building has a rainwater collection system that captures run-off water from the roof and parking lot, satisfying 74% of the museum's non-potable water needs and 100% of its irrigation needs.

The building is characterized by a continuous flow escalator, measuring 54 feet (16 m) in length and housed within a 150-foot (46 m) glass casing that extends diagonally outside the building cube. The building also prioritizes sustainability by utilizing LED lighting, off-grid energy generation technology, and solar-powered water heating. To enhance energy efficiency, the atrium and other spaces within the building benefit from natural sunlight via strategically placed skylights.

The building has secured 4 Green Globes from the Green Building Initiative. It got a rating of an overall 85% on the Green Globes rating scale and 100% for its design and its sustainable performance measures. Green Globes is a nationally recognized green building guidance and assessment program in the United States.

=== Permanent exhibit halls ===
Exhibit hall	Level	Feature Highlights
Moody Family Children's Museum	Lower Level	Dallas Skyline Climber allows kids to traverse a miniature Margaret Hunt Hill Bridge, and climb a playground made of tiny Dallas landmarks that includes the Dallas County Courthouse, Reunion Tower, the Magnolia Hotel, Thanksgiving Tower, and Neiman Marcus building.; Observe museum staff feed and maintain terrarium animals; Take a hike up the Trinity River; Mini Dallas Farmers Market designed to emphasize healthy choices of fresh fruits and vegetables
Sports	Lower Level	Sports Run is a 55-foot (17 m) interactive video exhibit where participants will be able to race Felix Jones of the Dallas Cowboys, Emily Richardson who is a WOGA Level 10 gymnast, a 3D life-size tyrannosaurus rex and a 3D life-size cheetah; View X-rays of sports injuries; Explore the human body's aerodynamics
Discovering Life	2	Interactive dioramas of three Texas ecosystems; Experience the East Texas Piney Woods; Smell the beeswax of the Blackland Prairie; Hear the prairie dog's alarm call in the Chihuahuan Desert; Create your own virtual cartoon dragon by playing the Genetic Lottery, a slot machine-type game
Being Human	2	Use motion capture to learn how the human body moves by mimicking instructors in hip-hop dance, basketball or tai chi as a visitor's body is projected next to theirs; View cross sections of real human bodies; Test out a prosthetic hand; Review human tissue samples; Record your own heartbeat; Toss a ping-pong ball with your mind; Get in the Bio Lab to extract DNA from wheat germ (8+), examine your own cheek cells (8+), dissect a fruit fly larva to see its giant chromosome (13+) or test antimicrobial agents (10+)
Texas Instruments Engineering and Innovation	2	Create music in a sound studio; Build a robot to learn how machines follow programmed instructions; Create a model skyscraper that can withstand an earthquake
The Rees-Jones Foundation Dynamic Earth	3	Simulated earthquake experience through the shake table simulator; Footage of real Texas tornadoes and hurricanes; The tornado simulator model
Lyda Hill Gems and Minerals	3	The world's third largest gold nugget (23.26 kg / 62.33 troy lbs) known as the Ausrox Gold Nugget that was discovered by three prospectors with a hand-held metal detector in April 2010 in the Eastern Goldfields, Australia. The nugget is irregular-shaped and has a surface that alternates between smooth, crystalline, and square. The nugget has been displayed at the Western Australia Museum at Kalgoorlie-Boulder and the Houston Museum of Natural Science. After its Perot Museum stop, it will be exhibited in Munich, Germany as part of a world tour; 1.5 ton geode called the Grape Jelly geode
Tom Hunt Energy	3	Virtually travel through 9,000 feet (2,700 m) of gas well in the Shale Voyager motion-based theater to experience natural gas fracking. Visitors will experience being shrunk down to travel into a well shaft less than 1 foot (0.30 m) wide in the Texas Barnett Shale; Learn the difference between onshore and offshore oil drilling; Learn about traditional and alternative fuels; Giant drill bit and gas turbine engine
T. Boone Pickens Life Then and Now	4	Follow the evolution of life on Earth over 4 billion years, the Beringia land bridge where people migrated from Siberia to Alaska across a land bridge that spanned the current day Bering Strait and life in prehistoric Alaska. Soundscape for this exhibit was designed by students from the University of Texas at Dallas.: Cast of 35 feet (11 m) Alamosaurus and an actual Alamosaurus skeleton; Cast of 35 feet (11 m) Malawisaurus
Expanding Universe	4	Experience the Big Bang through the creation of the Sun's Solar System via high-definition screens
Rose Hall of Birds	4 Mezzanine	Build your own bird by selecting wings, songs, diets, tails, feet and feathers to construct it and then put on 3D glasses and fly it

=== Temporary exhibit halls ===
Exhibit hall	Level	Exhibit Name	Date	Description
Jan and Trevor Rees-Jones Exhibition Hall	Lower Level	Building the Building	December 1, 2012– May 12, 2013	Showcases the stories of the more than 2,500 people it took to create and design the Victory Park campus building and exhibits. Includes interviews with museum leaders, architect Thom Mayne, exhibit designers, landscape designer Coy Talley, Balfour Beatty construction team members, local educators from school districts and universities. Also includes the remnants of a Ford Model T discovered as the site was prepared for construction.
Jan and Trevor Rees-Jones Exhibition Hall	Lower Level	Recycle Reef	June 17, 2013– August 25, 2013	Visitors will participate in building the exhibit from the ground up by using recyclable materials to transform them into creative works of art. The exhibit will be dynamic and ever-changing as it develops with each newly contributed art work. The entire exhibit will be recycled after the exhibit closes.
Jan and Trevor Rees-Jones Exhibition Hall	Lower Level	Body Worlds: Animal Inside Out	September 22, 2013– February 23, 2014	
Jan and Trevor Rees-Jones Exhibition Hall	Lower Level	Build It! Garage	June 21, 2014– August 17, 2014	
Jan and Trevor Rees-Jones Exhibition Hall	Lower Level	World's Largest Dinosaur	April 6, 2014– September 1, 2014	
Jan and Trevor Rees-Jones Exhibition Hall	Lower Level	2theXtreme: MathAlive!	September 27, 2014– January 1, 2015	
Jan and Trevor Rees-Jones Exhibition Hall	Lower Level	The International Exhibition of Sherlock Holmes	February 14, 2015– May 10, 2015	
Jan and Trevor Rees-Jones Exhibition Hall	Lower Level	Build It! Nature	June 19, 2015– August 6, 2015	
Jan and Trevor Rees-Jones Exhibition Hall	Lower Level	Amazing Animals: Built to Survive	June 13, 2015– September 7, 2015	
Jan and Trevor Rees-Jones Exhibition Hall	Lower Level	Creatures of Light: Nature's Bioluminescence	October 31, 2015– February 21, 2016	
Jan and Trevor Rees-Jones Exhibition Hall	Lower Level	Eye of the Collector	April 16, 2016– September 5, 2016	Nine exhibits displaying historical and fashionable objects of 10 people displaying their recollections of items they have gathered during their lives.
Jan and Trevor Rees-Jones Exhibition Hall	Lower Level	Birds of Paradise	October 8, 2016– January 8, 2017	Exhibits display video footage, photographs, artifacts, and interactive experiences to create a science exhibition, art show, and natural history display from a comprehensive study of all 39 known species of birds-of-paradise.
Lyda Hill Gems and Minerals	3rd Floor	Giant Gems of the Smithsonian	September 9, 2016– January 17, 2017	Exhibit displays a close up view of the National Museum of Natural History's National Gem Collection.
Jan and Trevor Rees-Jones Exhibition Hall	Lower Level	Maya: Hidden Worlds Revealed	February 11, 2017– September 4, 2017	Exhibit allowing guests to explore an underworld cave, excavate an ancient burial site, and encounter the richness of Maya culture through hands-on explorations such as building arches, deciphering hieroglyphs and translating the Maya calendar.
Jan and Trevor Rees-Jones Exhibition Hall	Lower Level	Ultimate Dinosaurs		
Lyda Hill Gems and Minerals	3rd Floor	Mineral Art of China		
Jan and Trevor Rees-Jones Exhibition Hall	Lower Level	The Art of the Brick		
Jan and Trevor Rees-Jones Exhibition Hall	Lower Level	The Science of Guinness World Records	March 6, 2021– September 6, 2021	
Jan and Trevor Rees-Jones Exhibition Hall	Lower Level	Becoming Jane	May 20 — September 2, 2022	
Jan and Trevor Rees-Jones Exhibition Hall	Lower Level	The Science Behind Pixar	November 16, 2022 — September 4, 2023	
Jan and Trevor Rees-Jones Exhibition Hall	Lower Level	T-Rex: The Ultimate Predator	November 13, 2023 — September 22, 2024	
Jan and Trevor Rees-Jones Exhibition Hall	Lower Level	Bug Lab	June 28, 2025 — January 4, 2026	

=== The Hoglund Foundation Theater A National Geographic Experience ===
The 297-seat Americans with Disabilities Act (ADA) compliant theater has a 2D, 3D 4K digital projection and sound system. The theater features a variety of films, from educational features and documentaries to experimental independent films.

== Educational outreach ==
The museum creates a Teacher's Guide, which is a booklet and online publication that is distributed to North Texas educators. The guide outlines programming designed for children pre-K to 12th grade in earth and space sciences, life and natural sciences, chemistry, physical sciences and engineering. Programming reinforces Texas Essential Knowledge and Skills (TEKS) objectives.

There are four educational outreach opportunities: field trips to the museum, onsite programming at schools (in the classroom and after school), community engagement through the museum's TECH Truck and The Whynauts virtual, bilingual video series.

=== Field trips ===
Students can explore 11 permanent exhibit halls, experience educational films in their theater, and take advantage of TEKS-aligned onsite classroom or auditorium programming. Further learning, available through program extensions, is held in the learning labs and auditorium of the museum's Lower Level. The museum also features educational films, offered in partnership with National Geographic.

=== Onsite programming at schools ===
Museum educators offer 26 programs that can be taught in schools’ classrooms, presented to large groups in auditoriums, or showcased as part of after-school programming.

=== Community engagement ===
The TECH Truck brings hands-on discovery directly to community centers programs, libraries, parks, public events, out-of-school programs and more — providing science-based experiences for the public.

=== The Whynauts ===
Bring the wonders of the Perot Museum to your classroom through an interactive, bilingual, STEM educational series.

== See also ==
- List of nature centers in Texas
- List of museums in North Texas
- Heard Natural Science Museum and Wildlife Sanctuary
- Fort Worth Museum of Science and History
- National Register of Historic Places listings in Dallas County, Texas
- List of Dallas Landmarks
