= W. C. Tyrrell =

American financier

William Casper "Captain W.C." Tyrrell, (January 12, 1847 – September 14, 1924), was an oil tycoon, venture capitalist, and prominent businessman of Beaumont, Texas during the Texas oil boom of the early 20th century.

== Life ==
William Casper Tyrrell was born in Pennsylvania in 1847 to Mallory and Polly (née Titus) Tyrrell. He married Frances Helen Rorick and the couple had one daughter together, Esther, born in 1869.

Eventually settling in Pleasant Township, Iowa, Tyrrell was soon investing in grain mills and real estate. By 1873 he had purchased the large farm of Smith & Munson from state senator E. A. Howland. After learning of the 1901 Spindletop gusher in Beaumont, Texas, Tyrrell relocated his family to the area.

Tyrrell established himself in Beaumont as an oil speculator and businessman and eventually earned millions from his ventures. An active philanthropist, he often donated to the poor, helped victims of natural disasters, and otherwise performed numerous other generous deeds throughout his lifetime.

In 1923, Tyrrell purchased what had once been the First Baptist Church of Beaumont and donated it to the city for use as a public library, now known as the Tyrrell Historical Library. Its historical holdings include many genealogical records. Several other local landmarks, including the Tyrrell Park, draw their names from Tyrrell as well.

As an investor during economically depressed times, Tyrrell provided much-needed capital to fledgling entrepreneurs and struggling businesses, such as funding the development of the city's first commercial port, contributing to an irrigation system to support the area's growing rice culture, and investing heavily in residential and commercial development. Tyrrell was also very active in the Port Arthur and Houston areas.
