= Fort Worth Flyover =

Fort Worth Flyover is the name of a short IMAX film created for the Omni Theater at the Fort Worth Museum of Science and History, the first one commissioned by a specific museum. Designed to simulate flying over Fort Worth, Texas in a helicopter, the movie (and later, a 1992 update) is traditionally shown before each Omni Theater feature, in part to acclimatize new viewers to the OMNIMAX domed-theater format.

== History ==
The original Fort Worth Flyover debuted in April 1983 as part of The Legend of the Sleeping Panther, a multimedia presentation on the city's history that accompanied the Omni Theater's first IMAX feature, Hail Columbia!. The Fort Worth flyover was filmed by cinematographer David Pinkston, native of Fort Worth, using a Bell 206B Jetranger II.

The original decision was to use a short 20 or 30 second portion of the footage obtained by the helicopter in Panther. However, the quality of the imagery was stunning; the museum decided to keep an unusually-long 45-second shot in the Panther documentary.

Sleeping Panther was to be retired at the end of Omni Theater's Hail Columbia! engagement, but the helicopter ride and a 2-minute "logo" feature was kept due to popular demand. The 2-minute segment ran before most full-length IMAX and OMNIMAX shows.

In 1992, the museum produced an updated version, Fort Worth Flyover II, directed by Ben Shedd; this version continues to be shown before Omni Theater features. This version was shot with the assistance of the CareFlite air ambulance service, using Bell helicopters, including tail number N206BS, another Bell 206B, using working title "The Sequel."

== Content ==
Both Fort Worth Flyover films are shot by helicopter and feature aerial views of the city, primarily the downtown area. The original film ends with a shot of downtown from a vantage point near the museum, including Will Rogers Memorial Center across the street.

Fort Worth Flyover II begins with a leisurely daytime view of the city, as well as a CareFlite air ambulance helicopter flying below. The audience is then zoomed around Fort Worth at night, followed by a similarly speedy daytime view, before hovering over the Fort Worth Museum of Science and History itself. There, a crowd waves and cheers from the roof near the Noble Planetarium's dome (decorated as a volcano for the Omni's 1992 engagement of Ring of Fire).

The building seen in Flyover II was demolished in late 2007 for the new museum campus, but this version continues to be shown before Omni features.

A video of the film was published on YouTube by the Museum.

== Landmarks ==
In addition to the museum, Fort Worth buildings that can be recognized in Flyover II include:

- Tandy Center (now City Place), lit with "TANDY" on one tower and "CENTER" on the other
- Bank One Tower, a downtown skyscraper, now renovated and reopened as The Tower after extensive damage from the March 28, 2000 tornado
- Cook Children's Medical Center, the blue roof of which is lit up in the nighttime sequence
