= Fort Worth Museum of Science and History =

Museum in the United States

Coordinates: 32°44′40″N 97°22′10″W

- Established: 1945
- Location: 1600 Gendy St. Fort Worth, Texas
- Type: Science and history
- Accreditation: AAM Accredited Museum
- Website: http://www.fortworthmuseum.org/

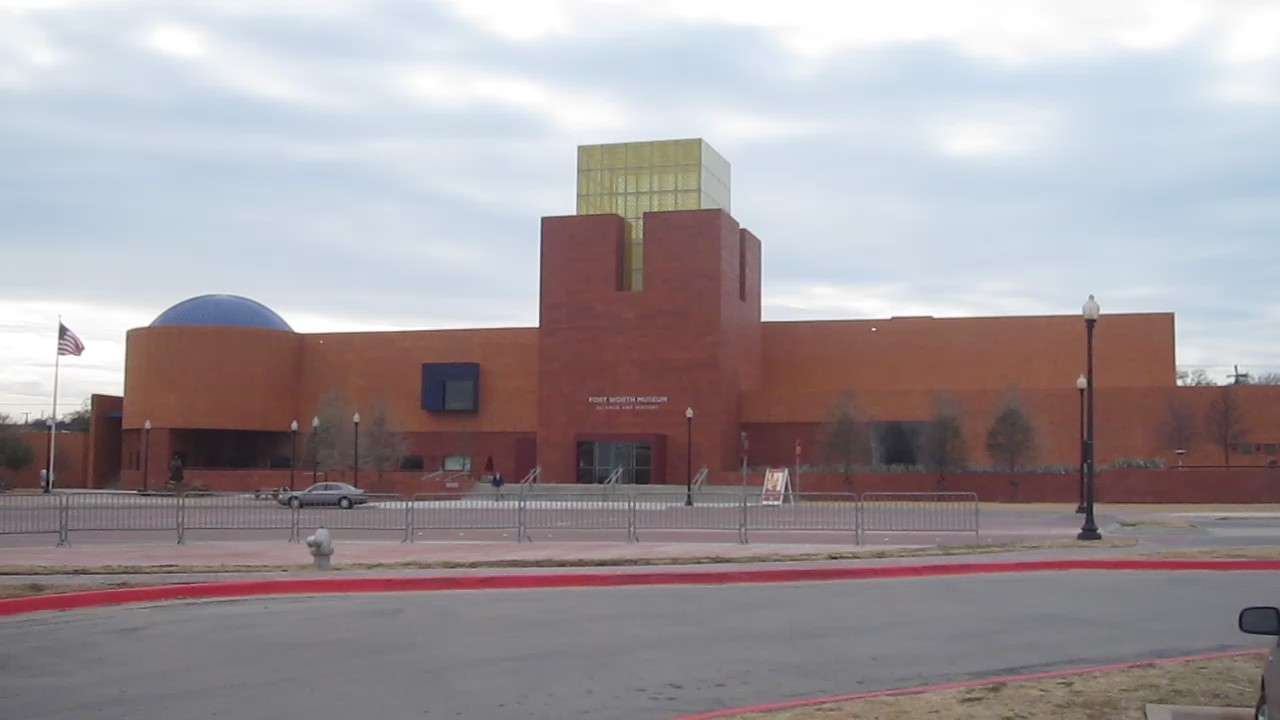

The Fort Worth Museum of Science and History is located at 1600 Gendy Street, in the Cultural District of Fort Worth, Texas. It was opened in 1945 as the Fort Worth Children's Museum and moved to its current location in 1954. In 1968, the museum adopted its current name. Attractions at the museum include the Noble Planetarium, the Omni Theater, and the Star's Café, in addition to both traveling and permanent science and history exhibits.

In the fall of 2007, the museum was closed for renovations. During construction the museum had a limited presence in the National Cowgirl Museum and Hall of Fame next door, with a temporary "2 museums, 1 roof" campaign. The entire museum was moved into a new building at the same site in 2009. The new building was designed by architects Legorreta + Legorreta with Gideon Toal and consists of 166,000 square feet. The original Omni Theater and lobby were refurbished but left mostly intact. In addition, the museum left one tree from the original museum courtyard undisturbed and built the museum around it, leaving the tree in an open area called the Heritage Courtyard. The total maximum occupancy is 3,369 individuals. The museum's opening after renovations was on Friday, November 20, 2009.

== Permanent exhibits ==
=== Fort Worth Children's Museum ===
The Children’s Museum gallery targets the Museum’s youngest guests – age birth to 8 – and those who care for them.

=== DinoLabs & DinoDig ===
The museum is the home of the holotypes of Paluxysaurus jonesii (now classed as a synonym of Sauroposeidon) and Tenontosaurus dossi. Also on display is an Allosaurus hunting a Camptosaurus.

=== Cattle Raisers Museum ===
A "museum within a museum," the Cattle Raisers Museum is located on the second floor of the Fort Worth Museum of Science and History. The 10,000-square-foot exhibition tells the story of the cattle industry.

=== Innovation Studios ===
Innovation Studios are located off the Museum’s central corridor. These five glass-walled studios – which surround Innovation Gallery – are called "Inventor," "Doodler," "Designer," "Imaginer," and "Explorer." They are 6,000 square feet of learning spaces.

== 150 Years of Fort Worth ==
"150 Years of Fort Worth" traced Fort Worth's development, from its beginning as a frontier outpost, through its youth as a cattle town, to the present day. Created by the Fort Worth Museum of Science and History, in cooperation with City Center Development Co., the exhibit was housed in the historic Fire Station No. 1, which was built in 1907. Fire Station No. 1 is located in the City Center complex at the northeast corner of Second and Commerce streets. This exhibit closed on February 19, 2016.

== Noble Planetarium ==
The Noble Planetarium is named for Charlie Mary Noble, an educator, astronomer, and scientist. The 80-seat planetarium shows a combination of live and recorded shows, including "Dream to Fly," a show about the history of aviation. The newly-renovated Noble Space Gallery hosts a collection of artifacts from the space race, including many that traveled to space.

== Museum School ==
In 1950, the Museum School preschool was founded under the title "Frisky and Blossom Club." Located on the museum campus, the school teaches children ages 3-6 with a focus on science, technology, engineering, and mathematics. The curriculum includes the study of animals, geology, and engineering, among other topics.

== See also ==
- Fort Worth Flyover, a short IMAX film commissioned by the museum and traditionally shown before Omni Theater movies
- CSI: The Experience, an exhibit developed by the museum and its partners
- List of museums in North Texas
- Heard Natural Science Museum and Wildlife Sanctuary
- Perot Museum of Nature and Science
