= Tom Hunt (executive) =

American businessman

Thomas Myers Hunt (May 27, 1923 – November 11, 2008) was an American petroleum industry executive who was chairman of Hunt Petroleum and an advisor to his uncle H. L. Hunt, the founder of the family dynasty.

== Biography ==
Hunt was born in Pana, Illinois. He served during World War II in the Pacific with the 380th Bomb Group of the United States Army Air Corps in the Pacific Theater. Hunt flew on the first bomber from the 380th to land in Japan, and flew on a B-24 Liberator representing the 380th during a flyover of Tokyo Bay to mark the Japanese surrender on the USS Missouri.

Hunt attended the University of Arkansas, where he studied chemical engineering, but at his uncle Herbert's suggestion, he worked for the family oil interests in Wyoming, North Dakota, and in Montana's Williston Basin. He was ultimately assigned to manage the Hunt family operations in Louisiana.

Hunt played a major role in the negotiations of the June 2008 acquisition of Hunt Petroleum by Fort Worth, Texas-based XTO Energy for $4.186 billion. Tom Hunt served as the trustee for the family trusts of Margaret Hunt Hill and Hassie Hunt which each owned half of Hunt Petroleum. Al Hill III, grandson of Margaret Hunt Hill, sued his father and other family members to block the sale, including demands that Tom Hunt be removed as trustee.

Hunt spoke at the October 2008 unveiling of plans the Tom Hunt Energy Hall to be located at the Museum of Nature & Science's new location in the Victory Park development. The name recognizes a contribution of $10 million made to the museum by Hunt Petroleum in 2005.

Part of a clan that The New York Times described as "a family of great egos", Tom Hunt was a plain-living bachelor, who worked out of a sparse office and answered his own phone. He lived in a modest townhouse in University Park, Texas and enjoyed gardening and making nut candy. He never amassed the huge personal fortune of many of his relatives.

Hunt died at age 85 on November 11, 2008 in Dallas at the Baylor University Medical Center. The cause of death was leukemia.
