= Beaumont Botanical Gardens =

Botanical gardens in Beaumont, Texas, United States

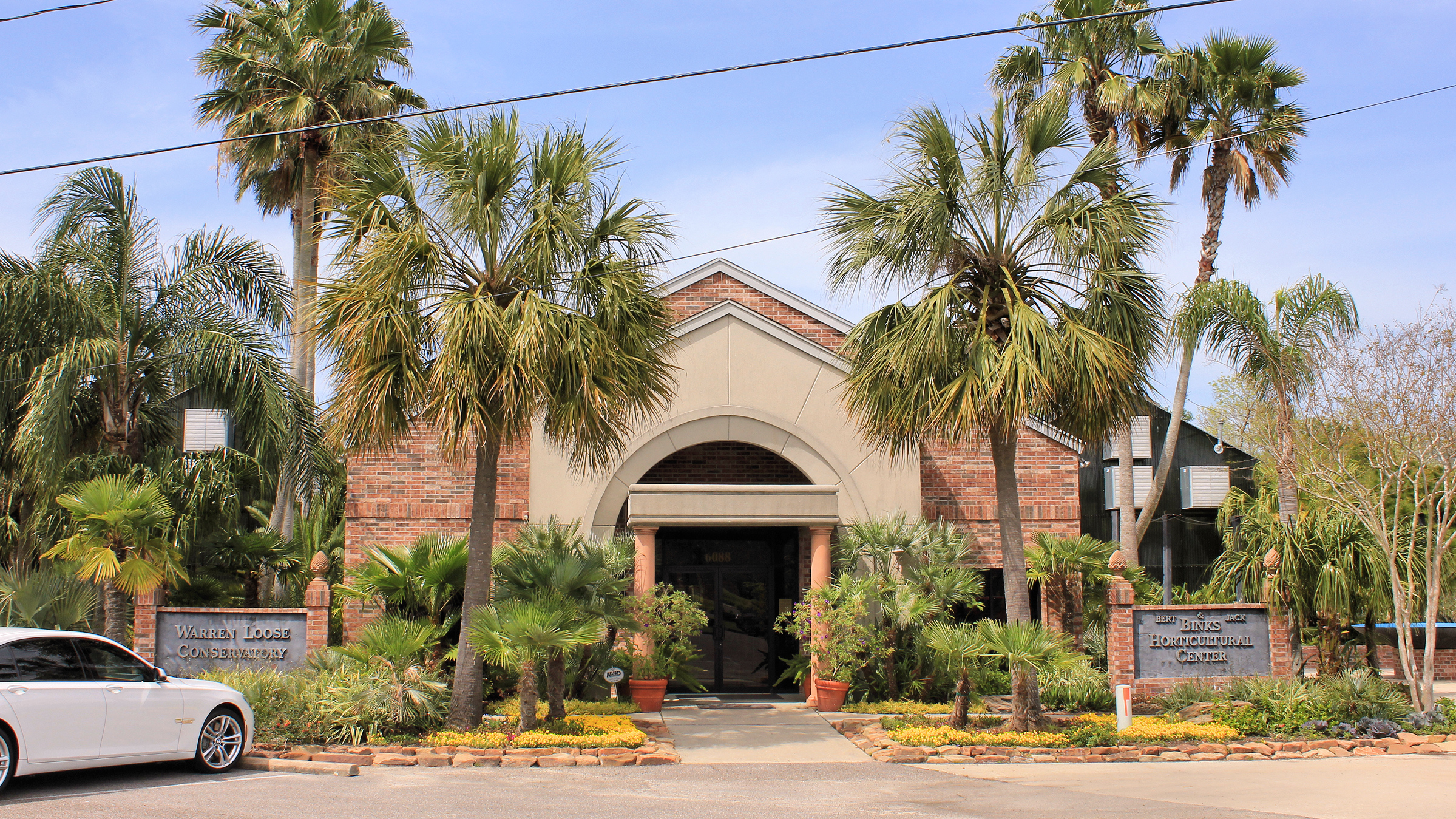
- Interactive map of Beaumont Botanical Gardens
- Type: Botanical garden
- Location: In Tyrrell Park at 6088 Babe Zaharias Drive, Beaumont, Texas, USA
- Area: 23.5 acres (9.5 ha)
- Parking: Free onsite parking.
- Website: www.bbgtx.org

The Beaumont Botanical Gardens 23.5 acres (9.5 ha), also known as the Tyrrell Park Botanical Gardens, includes botanical gardens and the 10,000 sq ft Warren Loose conservatory. The gardens are located in 500 acre Tyrrell Park at 6088 Babe Zaharias Drive, Beaumont, Texas, USA. An extra benefit is that the gardens are located in a migratory bird flyway. Tyrrell Park is listed on the Great Texas Coastal Birding Trail map.

== History ==
The gardens trace their origin to April 12, 1951, when the Beaumont Council of Garden Clubs was formed. Creation of a public garden was one of the goals of that organization. The gardens were first established in 1968 when the city of Beaumont set aside 10 acres of land at Tyrrell Park. The Beaumont Garden Center Building was dedicated on August 20, 1971. In 1972, a master plan for the gardens was drawn up, and labeling of the trees, vines, and shrubs begun. The Beaumont Garden Center became the Beaumont Botanical Gardens in 1996. In 1999, the city of Beaumont set aside additional acreage increasing the gardens to the present size of 23.5 acres.

== Features ==
=== Outdoor gardens ===
A variety of gardens and structures have been added over the subsequent years, including:

- Green and White Garden (1986)
- Stream Bed Garden (1986)
- Antique Rose Garden (1987)
- Shelter Building in the Garden (1988)
- Grandmother's Garden (1989)
- Modern Rose Garden (1990)
- Japanese garden (1991)
- Gazebo (1991)
- Azalea Trail (1991)
- Daylily Display Garden (1991)
- Native Plant Garden (1992)
- Bromeliad
- Display Garden (1992)
- herb garden (1994)
- Violet's Garden (1994)
- Camellia Garden (1995)
- Vi's Fountain (1996)
- Secret Garden (2000)
- Palm
- Agave Garden (2001)
- The Bob Whitman Propagation House (2001).

=== Indoor gardens ===
Also on the grounds are the Binks Horticultural Center and the 10,000-square-foot (930 m^{2}) Warren Loose Conservatory, one of the largest in Texas. The Loose Conservatory features tropical plants from around the world, a waterfall, a Koi fish pool; and many theme gardens displaying camellias, modern and antique roses, bromeliads, and native plants. The Warren Loose Conservatory was dedicated on September 7, 1997. The Binks Horticultural Center was dedicated on February 14, 2000. The Bob Whitman Propagation House has a collection of rare bromeliads and orchids.

=== Recovery from Hurricanes Rita and Ike ===
Hurricane Rita, in 2005, and Hurricane Ike in 2008, both damaged the conservatory as well as numerous trees on the garden grounds. In addition, the outdoor walks were damaged and many plants did not survive. Not only was the damage repaired and plants replaced, but many improvements to the grounds and buildings were made.

== Hours and accessibility ==
The outdoor gardens are open to the public every day during daylight hours at no charge; while the conservatory is open Monday, Tuesday, and Thursday from 9 am to 4 pm, Saturday and Sunday from 1 pm to 5 pm from April through October and noon to 4 pm November through March. (closed on Wednesdays and major holidays) Both the outdoor gardens and the Warren Loose Conservatory are wheel chair and stroller accessible. A large meeting center is also on the grounds.

== See also ==
- List of botanical gardens in the United States
- Shangri La Botanical Gardens and Nature Center
