= Edith L. Moore Nature Sanctuary =

Nature sanctuary in Houston, Texas, US

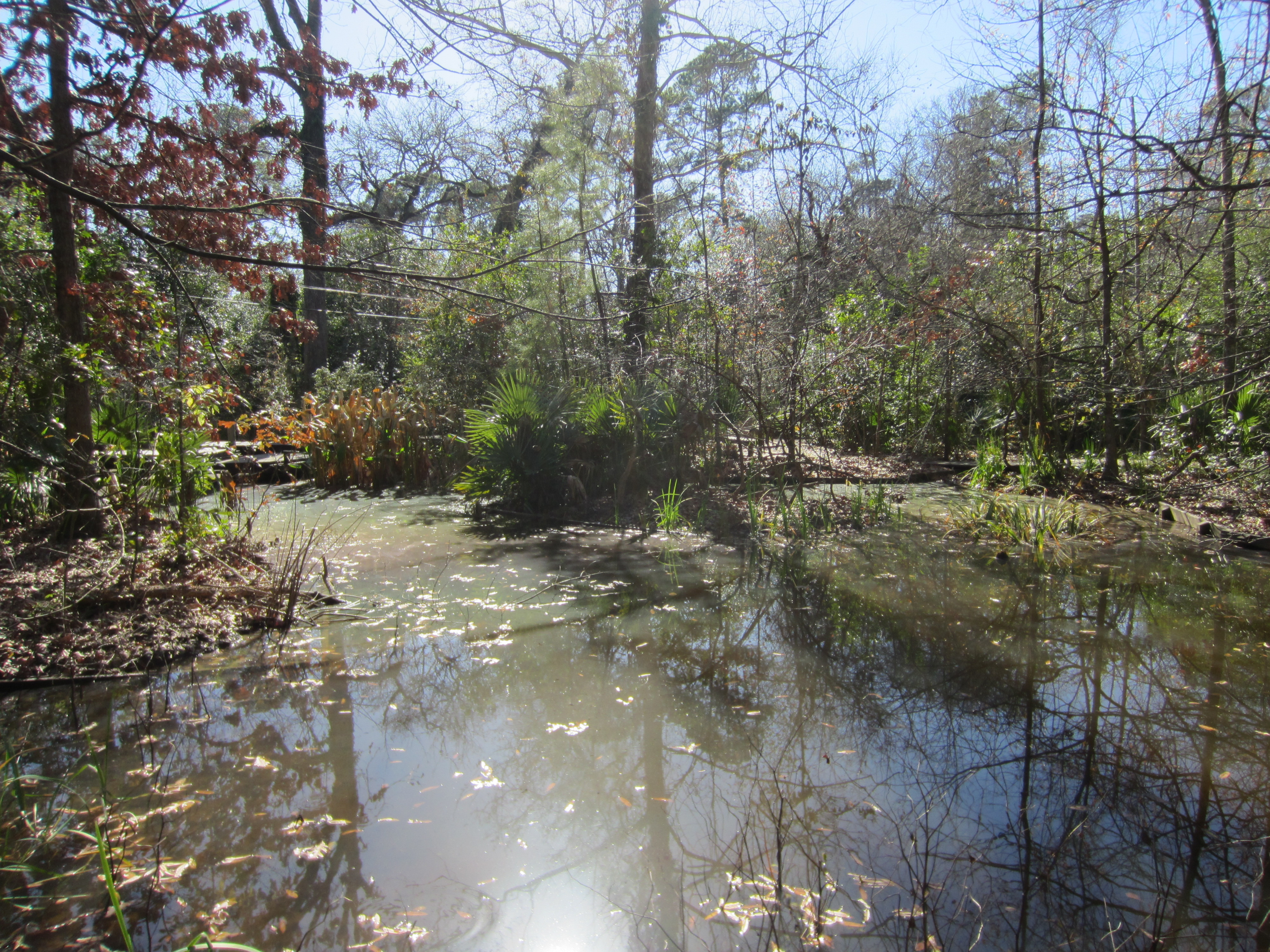
- Part of the sanctuary, 2014
- Interactive map of Edith L. Moore Nature Sanctuary
- Type: Nature sanctuary
- Location: Rummel Creek
- Nearest city: Houston, Texas, U.S.
- Coordinates: 29.771°N 95.569°W
- Area: 17.5 acres (7.1 ha)
- Created: 1975
- Operator: Houston Audubon
- Open: 7 am–7 pm Monday–Friday, 9 am–5 pm Sunday

The Edith L. Moore Nature Sanctuary is a 17.5-acre (7.1 ha) nature sanctuary along Rummel Creek, located in Houston, Texas, in the United States. Named after Edith Lotz Moore, who lived on the land with her husband for 43 years, the sanctuary includes a restored log cabin for hosting educational programs and houses administrative offices for the Houston Audubon Society. Since 1975, Houston Audubon has preserved Edith Moore's log cabin in addition to developing trails, creating education programs, constructing an office, and performing outreach from the site. The sanctuary also operates a plant nursery that provides wildflowers and grasses for coastal prairie restoration projects or offered for sale to support the Audubon programs. It specializes in local native prairie grasses and wildflowers with a small selection of understory plants. Moore donated land to the Houston Audubon Society in 1975, to be used as a nature preserve for birds. According to the Houston Audubon Society, the sanctuary's mission is to "provide an urban wildlife sanctuary for native plants and animals and to provide education about the natural environment to Houstonians of all ages." Birding programs and day camps held at the sanctuary serve more than ten thousand children and adults every year. This trail is accessible from 7 am to 7 pm Monday–Friday, 9 am–5 pm Sunday.

== Moore Log House ==
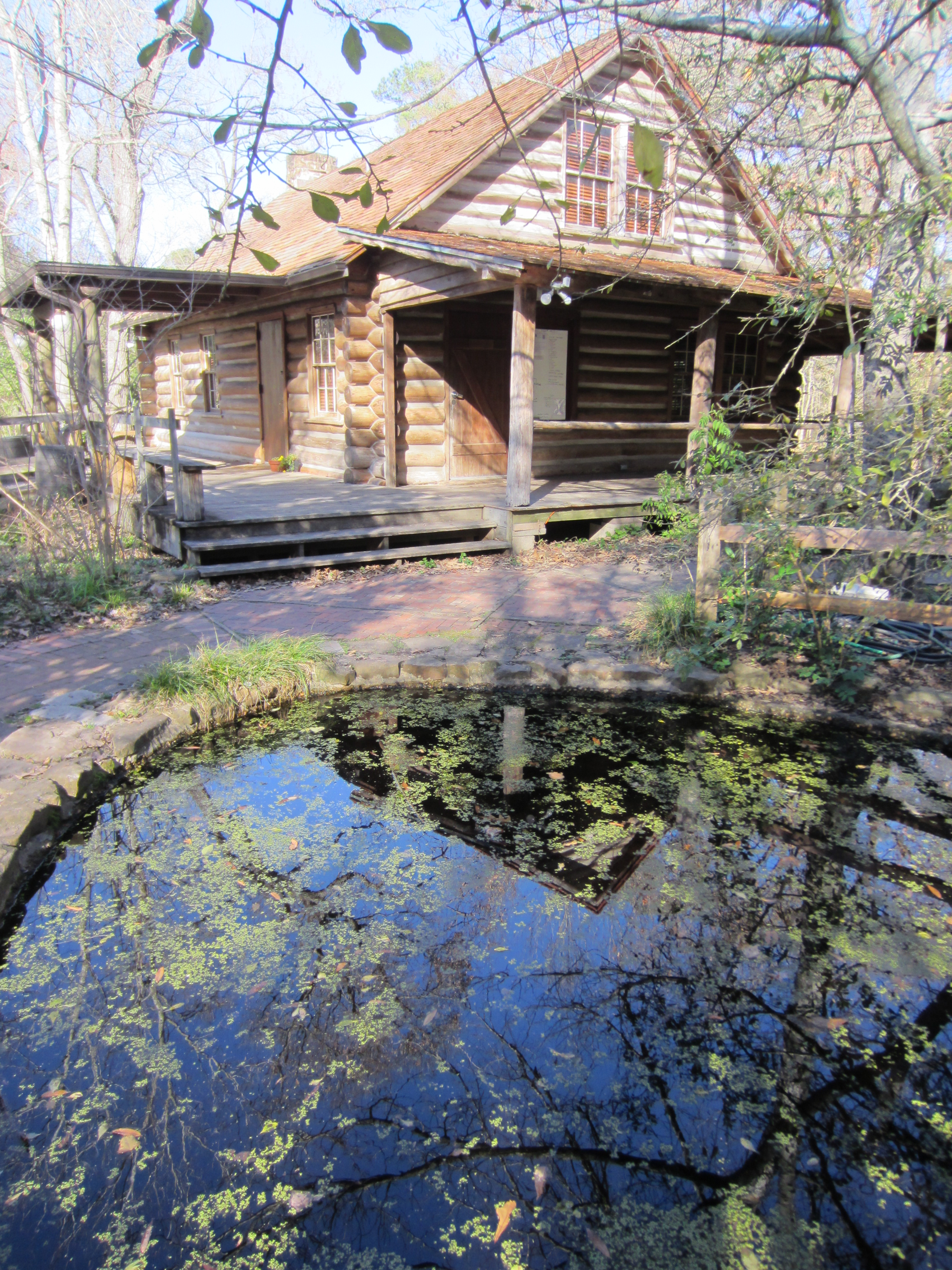
Edith L. Moore Nature Sanctuary, Houston, Texas (2014)

Edith Moore and her husband Jesse were "early environmentalists", never harvesting a tree that was less than 10 inches in diameter. The pine logs used to build the cabin were cut from their land; the chimney and fireplace are built of sandstone curbstones reclaimed from the City of Houston.

== Edith Lotz Moore ==
Edith Moore was born July 12, 1884, in Minnesota. To pay for her education at the University of Minnesota, she sang at weddings. She moved to Houston during World War I to work as a bacteriologist and pathologist at Camp Logan, now known as Memorial Park. When she graduated from the University of Minnesota, she came to Houston during WWI to do her part for the war by working as a bacteriologist and pathologist at Camp Logan, a military installation in what is now Memorial Park. When the war ended, she went to work for the City of Houston as a scientist and married a milk inspector named Jesse Moore.

== See also ==
- List of nature centers in Texas
