= Tyrrell Park =

Park in Beaumont, Texas, US

Tyrrell Park and Cattail Marsh
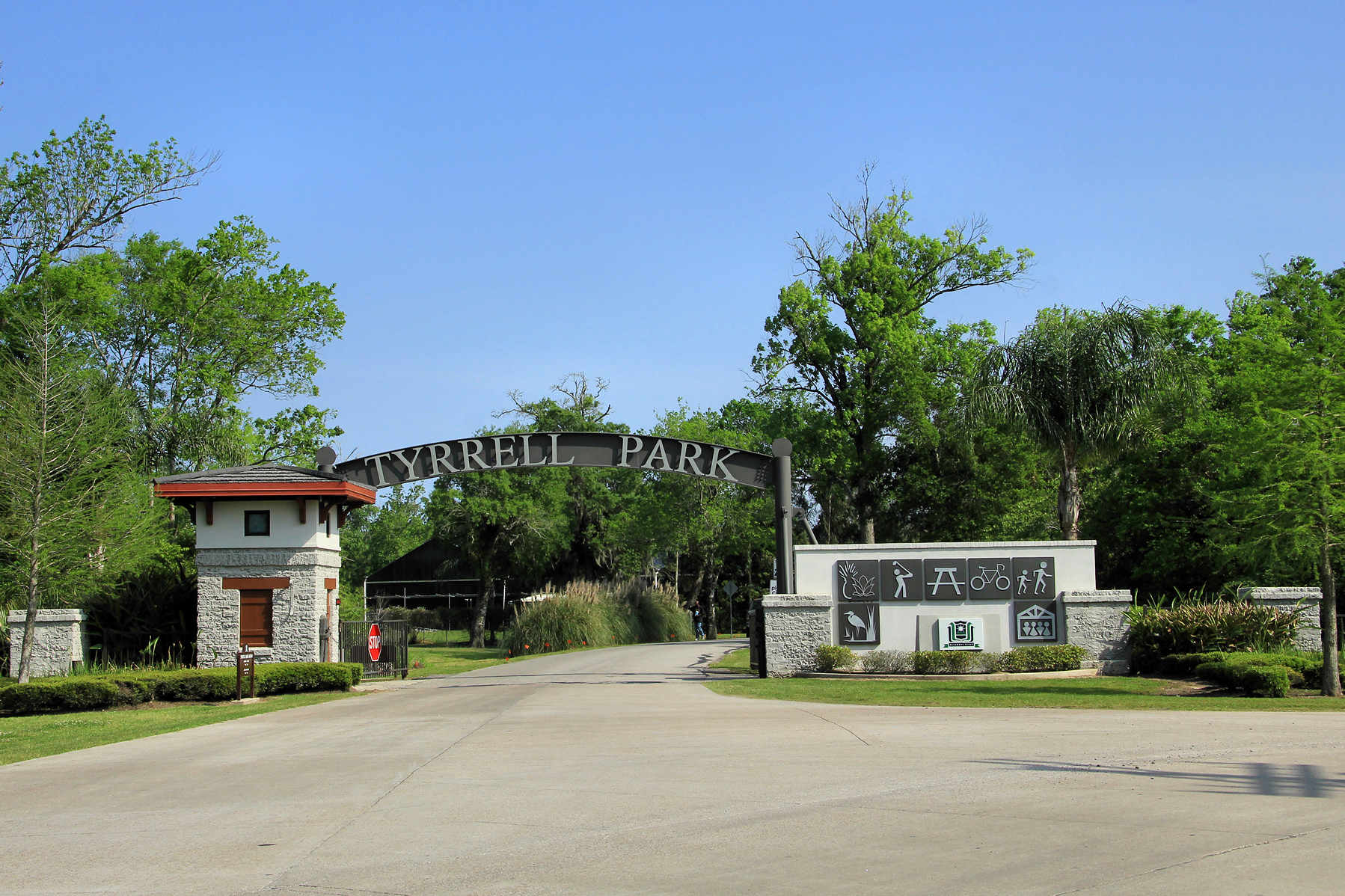
- Tyrrell Park entrance
- Interactive map of Tyrrell Park and Cattail Marsh
- Type: Municipal (Beaumont, Texas)
- Location: 5305 Tyrrell Park Road, Beaumont, Texas 77705
- Coordinates: 30°01′29″N 94°08′55″W
- Area: Tyrrell Park 500 acres (2 km^{2}); Cattail Marsh 900 acres (4 km^{2})
- Created: Tyrrell Park: 1924; Cattail Marsh: 1993
- Operator: Tyrrell Park: Beaumont Parks and Recreation Department; Cattail Marsh: Beaumont Water Utilities
- Status: Open all year

Tyrrell Park is a municipal park located in Beaumont, Texas. The park has an area of around 500 acres (2.0 km^{2}). It includes the eighteen hole Henry Homberg Golf Course; the Beaumont Botanical Gardens and Warren Loose Conservatory, the second largest public conservatory in Texas; a hiking trail; an equestrian center; and facilities for several sports and outdoor activities. Adjacent to the park is the 900 acres (4 km^{2}) Cattail Marsh, a nature center with hiking trail. The park is located in a migratory bird flyway and Tyrrell Park is listed on the Great Texas Coastal Birding Trail.

== Tyrrell Park ==
In 1923 Captain W. C. Tyrrell donated roughly 1500 acres of land in downtown Beaumont to the city to be used as a park. From November 24, 1935, and June 30, 1941, Civilian Conservation Corps Company 845 built drainage ditches, the park entrance way, the golf course, horse stables, roads, nature trails, picnic tables, and recreation buildings. The park was used as a prisoner of war camp for German prisoners during World War II. Many of the CCC buildings are no longer standing due to neglect.

=== Features ===
- Henry Homberg Golf Course - The Henry Homberg Golf Course is an eighteen-hole golf course. It was originally constructed by the Civilian Conservation Corps in the late 1930s during the initial development of the park grounds. The course is 6,786 yards long from the blue tee box and 6,449 yard long from the middle tee box. Outbound, the lengths are 3,290 yards and 3,105 yards respectively while the inbound lengths are 3,496 yards and 3,344 yards.
- Beaumont Botanical Gardens – The Beaumont Botanical Gardens are located near the entrance to the park. The gardens include 23.5 acres (0.095 km^{2}). A combination of over ten outdoor themed gardens as well as three indoor facilities. The 10,000 square feet (930 m^{2}) Warren Loose Conservatory is the second largest public horticultural conservatory in Texas. The Binks Horticultural Center is near the entrance to the conservatory. Another indoor facility is the Bob Whitman Propagation House.
- Tyrrell Park Horse Stables - Idle for six years as of September, 2015, the horse stables are undergoing a renewed development. The twelve stall stable building dates back to the Civilian Conservation Corps/World War II era.
- Hiking and Biking Trails - The park has a 2.8 mile walking nature trail. Roads in the park can be used for biking.
- Other Features - Other features include covered pavilions, picnic areas, and athletic fields.

== Cattail Marsh ==
The Cattail Marsh Nature Area consists of approximately 900 acres of levees, ponds, and mudflats. Located next to Hillebrandt Bayou, the marsh system was created as one of the final stages of waste water filtration for the city of Beaumont. The levees provide over twelve miles of hiking, biking, and horseback trails. A 520-foot boardwalk with viewing platforms at a cost of $285,000 was constructed in 2016. The marsh and surrounding areas support a wide variety of local wildlife. Besides the many species of birds, numerous alligators can be found in the area as well.
