= Lewisville Lake Environmental Learning Area =

Nature preserve in Denton County, Texas

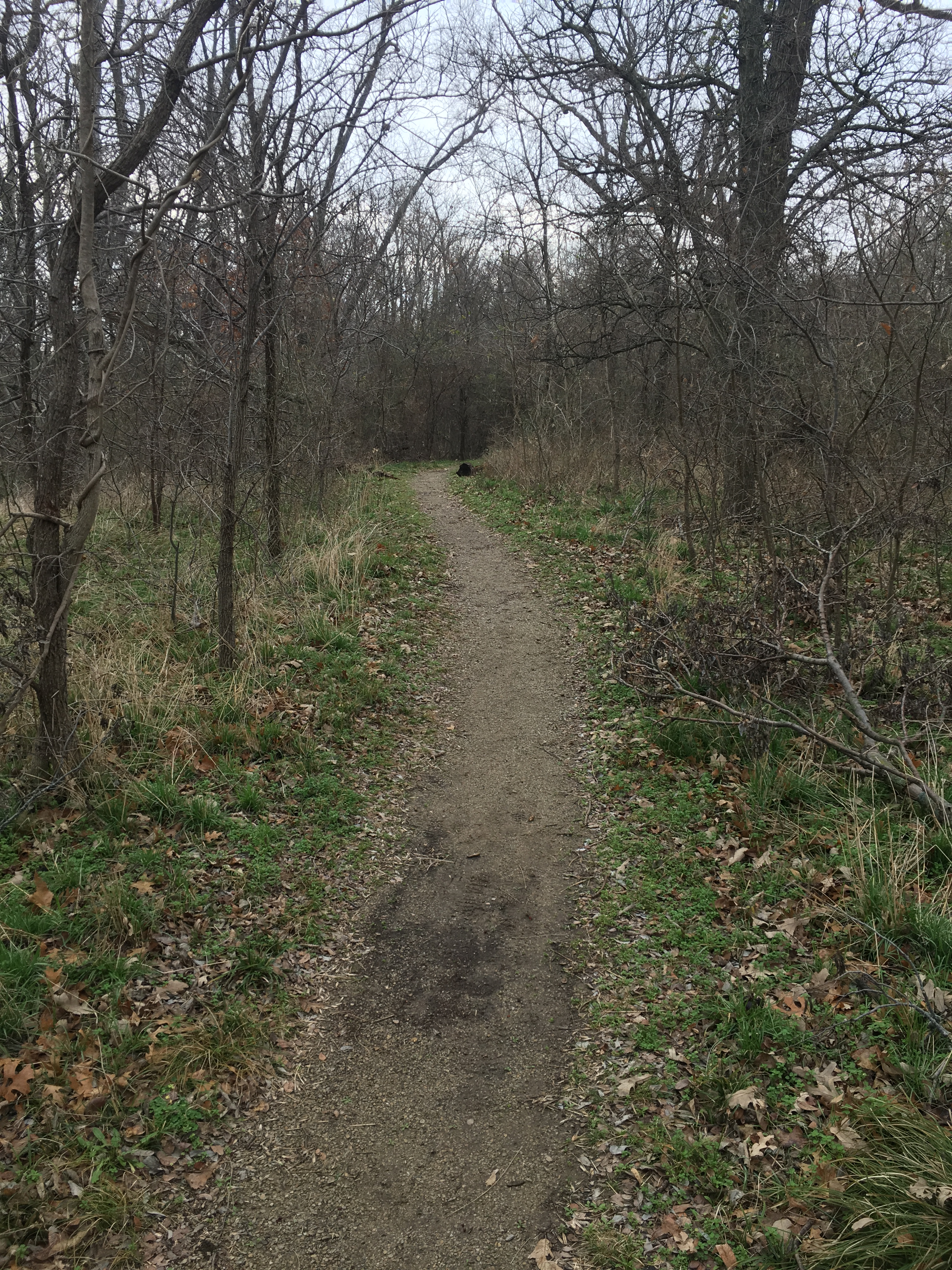
- Cicada Trail at LLELA, January 2020

- Location within Texas
- Location: Lewisville, Texas
- Coordinates: 33°03′57″N 96°58′30″W
- Area: 2,600 acres (1,100 ha)
- Website: https://www.llela.org/

Lewisville Lake Environmental Learning Area, or LLELA, is a 2,600-acre park in Lewisville, Texas. It features Blackland Prairie and Eastern Cross Timbers ecosystems, as well as wetlands and hardwood forests. The Elm Fork branch of the Trinity River runs through the park, and it is adjacent to Lewisville Lake, although there is no lake access from the park.

== History ==
The park was created in the early 1990s from land bordering the newly created Lewisville Lake when a group of stakeholders including the U.S. Army Corps of Engineers, University of North Texas, the City of Lewisville, Lewisville ISD, University of Texas at Arlington, and the Texas A&M AgriLife Extension Service agreed to conserve the land for research purposes and to serve as an outdoor classroom for people in the DFW area.

The Minor-Porter log house, an historic cabin built in 1869, lies on the park's Cottonwood Trail. The house was restored in 2005 and was moved to LLELA and furnished with genuine 1800s artifacts and tools.

== Amenities and recreation ==
LLELA features a visitor center, over 7 miles of hiking trails, nine primitive campsites, a butterfly garden, and various spots for picknicking, fishing, kayaking, and canoeing. The park offers various guided activities, such as naturalist-led hikes, bird walks, and kayak tours.

== Plant and animal life ==
Due to the variety of different ecosystems that are present in LLELA, there is a diverse array of wildlife in the park, including over 360 vertebrate species. These include mammals such as deer, river otters, and armadillos, and many bird species, including a nesting pair of bald eagles.
