= Shangri La Botanical Gardens and Nature Center =

- Location within Texas
- Established: 1942, first opened to public in 1946, reopened March 7, 2009
- Location: 2111 West Park Avenue; Orange, Texas; United States
- Coordinates: 30.102735°N 93.751799°W
- Type: Botanical garden Nature center
- Parking: On site
- Website: shangrilagardens.org

Shangri La Botanical Gardens and Nature Center (252 acres) are private botanical gardens and a nature preserve located in the center of Orange, Texas, United States.

H. J. Lutcher Stark began work on Shangri La in 1942. His azalea gardens first opened to the public in 1946, but in the mid-1950s they were destroyed by very cold weather. The area was subsequently closed to the public and maintained on a very limited scale. It was then bequeathed by Nelda C. Stark to the Nelda C. and H. J. Lutcher Stark Foundation (established 1961), which has been working to restore the botanical gardens and create a nature center.

Shangri La contains a mixed deciduous forest, cypress tupelo swamp, wetlands, and a large lake. Many of its trees were heavily damaged or destroyed by Hurricane Rita in September 2005. The formal Botanical Gardens contain more than 300 plant species in five formal "rooms" as well as four sculpture "rooms." Adjacent to the Botanical Gardens is a bird blind which allows visitors to observe nesting birds in Shangri La’s heronry.

It opened in Spring 2008 to close again for nearly six months due to the damage sustained from Hurricane Ike (Sept. 2008) and was reopened to the public on March 7, 2009.

Shangri La Botanical Gardens and Nature Center is the first project in Texas and the 50th project in the world to earn the U.S. Green Building Council's Platinum certification for LEED-NC; the design and construction of Shangri La reached the highest green building and performance measures.

== See also ==
- List of botanical gardens in the United States
- Beaumont Botanical Gardens
