= List of newspapers of Dallas =

Newspapers published in Dallas, Texas, USA

The following newspapers are published in Dallas, Texas, United States):

- Auto Revista
- Daily Commercial Record
- Dallas Business Journal
- The Dallas Morning News
  - Al Día - produced by The Dallas Morning News
  - Quick - produced by The Dallas Morning News
- Dallas Examiner
- Dallas Observer
- Dallas Barta
- Dallas Voice
- El Extra
- Reform Dallas
- Slavic Voice of America
- Star Local News - distributes free and subscription newspapers in Dallas suburbs, including:
  - Allen American
  - Carrollton Leader
  - Celina Record
  - The Colony Courier Leader
  - Coppell Gazette
  - Frisco Enterprise
  - The Leader - in the cities of Flower Mound, Lewisville and Highland Village
  - Little Elm Journal
  - McKinney Courier-Gazette
  - Mesquite News
  - Plano Star Courier
  - The Rowlette Lakeshore Times
  - Southlake Times
- Texas Catholic
- Texas Jewish Post
- The Dallas Examiner
- Tre Weekly News Magazine - headquartered in Garland, serving the Vietnamese immigrants in DFW metroplex
- White Rock Lake Weekly - serving all of East Dallas, distributed for free

White Rock Lake Weekly

- World Journal - published in Richardson, serving Dallas

The Fort Worth Star-Telegram is based in Fort Worth, and The Park Cities News, Preston Hollow People, and Park Cities People are based in other Dallas suburbs.

== See also ==
- Texas media
  - List of newspapers in Texas
  - List of radio stations in Texas
  - List of television stations in Texas
  - Media of cities in Texas: Abilene, Amarillo, Austin, Beaumont, Brownsville, Dallas, Denton, El Paso, Fort Worth, Houston, Killeen, Laredo, Lubbock, McAllen, McKinney, Midland, Odessa, San Antonio, Waco, Wichita Falls
- Texas literature

== Bibliography ==
- Christopher H. Sterling, ed. (2009). "Dallas/Fort Worth". Encyclopedia of Journalism. Sage.
