= Valdasta, Texas =

- Unincorporated community
- Location within Texas Location within the United States
- Coordinates: 33°17′38″N 96°28′16″W
- Country: United States
- State: Texas
- County: Collin
- Elevation: 512 ft (156 m)
- Time zone: UTC-6 (Central (CST))
  - Summer (DST): UTC-5 (CDT)
- GNIS feature ID: 1380703

Valdasta (/vælˈdæstə/) is an unincorporated community in Collin County, located in the U.S. state of Texas. According to the Handbook of Texas, the community had a population of 40 in 1990. It is located within the Dallas-Fort Worth Metroplex.

== History ==
When he first moved to the area in 1882, Tandy W. Smith gave the hamlet the name Vandersville; however, the postal authorities rejected this name, so Smith renamed the town. In 1886, a post office was founded. There were four churches, two shops, a sawmill, a gin, and a flour mill serving about 100 people in 1896. In 1910, the town stopped receiving mail, and it was instead sent through Blue Ridge, which is nearby, but as the population grew, mail service was restored in March 1914. Farmers in the area used Valdasta as a church community. Its population was estimated to be 160 in 1925 and 50 in 1939. Between 1940 and 1990, the estimate stayed at 40. The mail service was terminated in 1954, and Blue Ridge was once more used to route mail.

== Geography ==
Valdasta is located on Farm to Market Road 545, 10 mi (16 km) northeast of McKinney in northeastern Collin County.

== Education ==
Valdasta once had its own school. Today the community is served by the Blue Ridge Independent School District.
