= Parks and open spaces of Collin County, Texas =

There are five county parks in Collin County, Texas.

== Bratonia Park ==
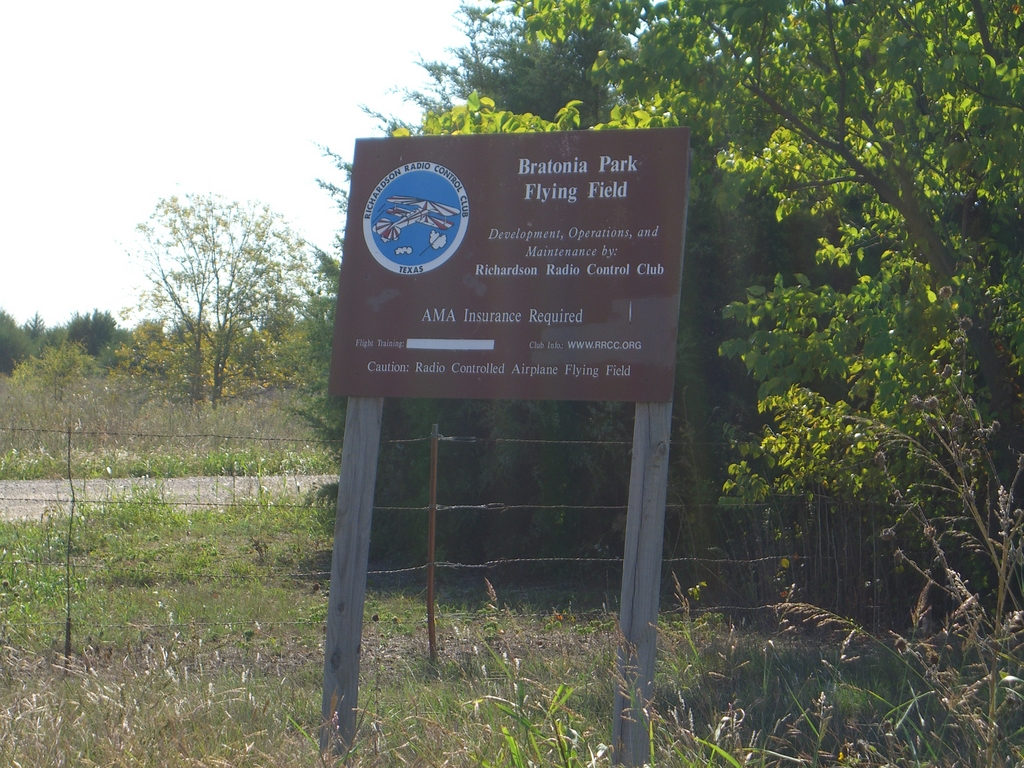
Bratonia Park

33°6′25.37″N 96°31′14.11″W
Located east of Lucas, Texas adjacent to Lake Lavon and next to a United States Army Corps of Engineers park, also named Bratonia Park. The Collin county Bratonia Park features a complete Model Airplane airpark, including a paved landing strip, workbenches and pilot zones. This park is operated and managed by the Richardson Radio Control Club.

== Myers Park ==
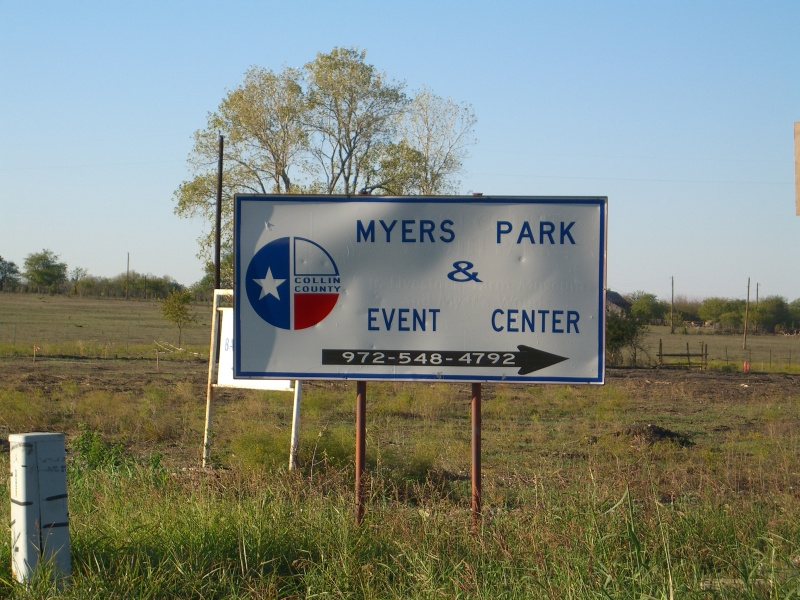
Myers Park

33°16′16.15″N 96°40′51.34″W
Myers Park and Event Center was originally created as the Collin County Youth Park in 1969 with area donated by John and Winnie Myers. The park has since grown to over 165 acres (0.7 km^{2}) of rolling land. Myers Park and Event Center is dedicated for use by the residents of Collin County.

The park offers a Show Barn and Indoor Arena, Outdoor Arena, Stall Barn, Reception Hall, Gazebo, Pole Barn (Picnic Pavilion), and two primitive group camping areas as rental venues.

=== Farm Museum ===
The Collin County Farm Museum is also located on the Myers park grounds, and has been managed by the Collin County Historical Society since August 23, 2005. This museum occupies 8,528 square feet (792 m^{2}) plus a blacksmith shop, a granary and the confinement house.

== Parkhill Prairie ==
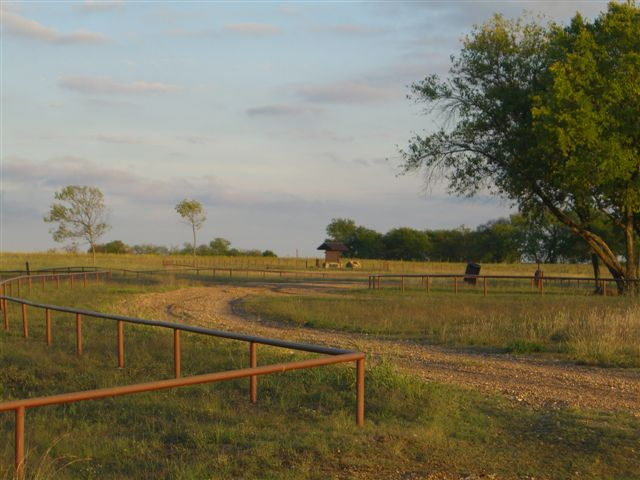
Parkhill Prairie at the northernmost picnic site looking East

33°16′18.25″N 96°17′58.65″W
A 436-acre (1.8 km^{2}) grassland park located in extreme northeast Collin County, Texas. The tax payers of Collin County provided the funding for this park in 1983 by passing the Open Space Bond Fund of Collin County. The park was contracted in 1986 and dedicated April 28, 1990.

The park features a 52-acre (0.2 km^{2}) acre relic of the Blackland tall-grass prairie and provides magnificent views of the countryside, much like those viewed by the early Texas settlers more than 100 years ago. Covered pavilions with cook pits and restroom facilities are available. The park is open during daylight hours.

In the Spring, this park serves as an abundant wildflower locale, as well as a birding resource, with nesting pairs of meadowlark and dickcissel. Butterflies are common here, with sightings of numerous species possible. Wildflowers on the prairie include prairie parsley, wild petunia, Indian paintbrush, winecup, prairie clovers, meadow pinks, purple coneflower, Mexican hat, gayfeather, azure sage, goldenrods and asters.

Two small ponds at Parkhill Prairie feature sunfish fishing on a virtually year-round basis. The park is a little-used resource, located on the very gently rolling hills common to this region. The frequent mild winds common to this area, coupled with the abundant open spaces, make this an ideal kite-flying area. Surrounding farm fields with lowing cattle give Parkhill Prairie a rural north Texas ambiance.

== Sister Grove Park ==
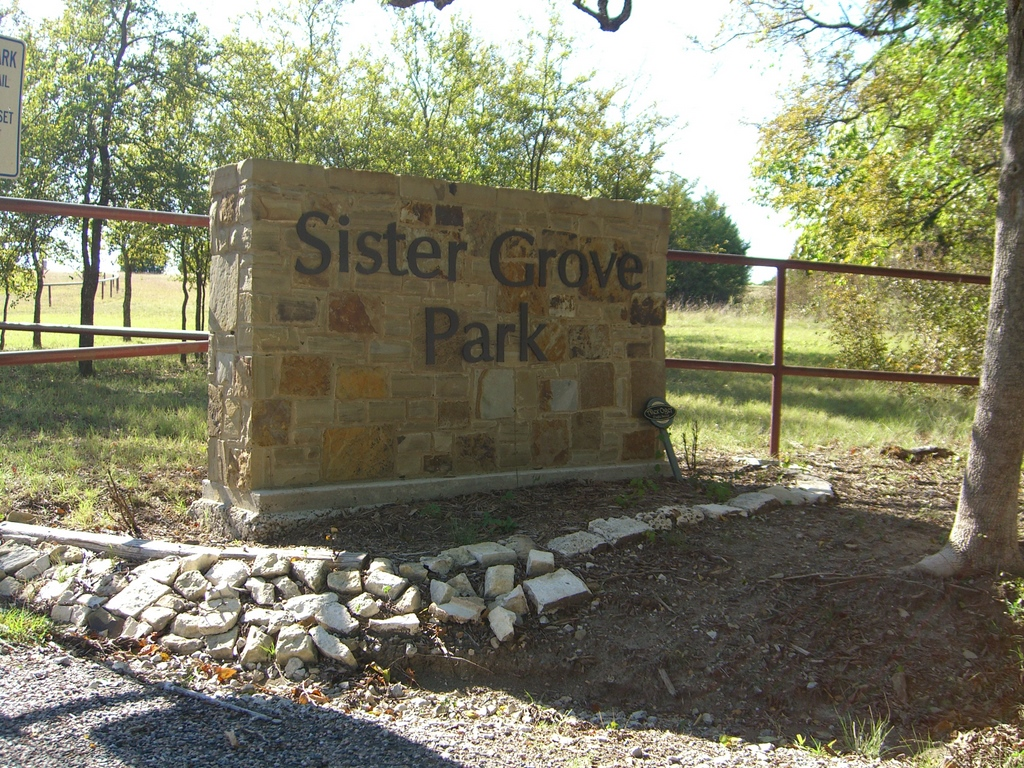
Sister Grove Park

33°10′59.82″N 96°26′46.70″W
Located near Princeton, Texas, about 40 miles (64 km) north-northeast of Dallas. This park is owned and maintained by Collin County. The park offers covered picnic tables, restroom facilities and parking.

The park is open during daylight hours.

=== Sister Grove Trail ===
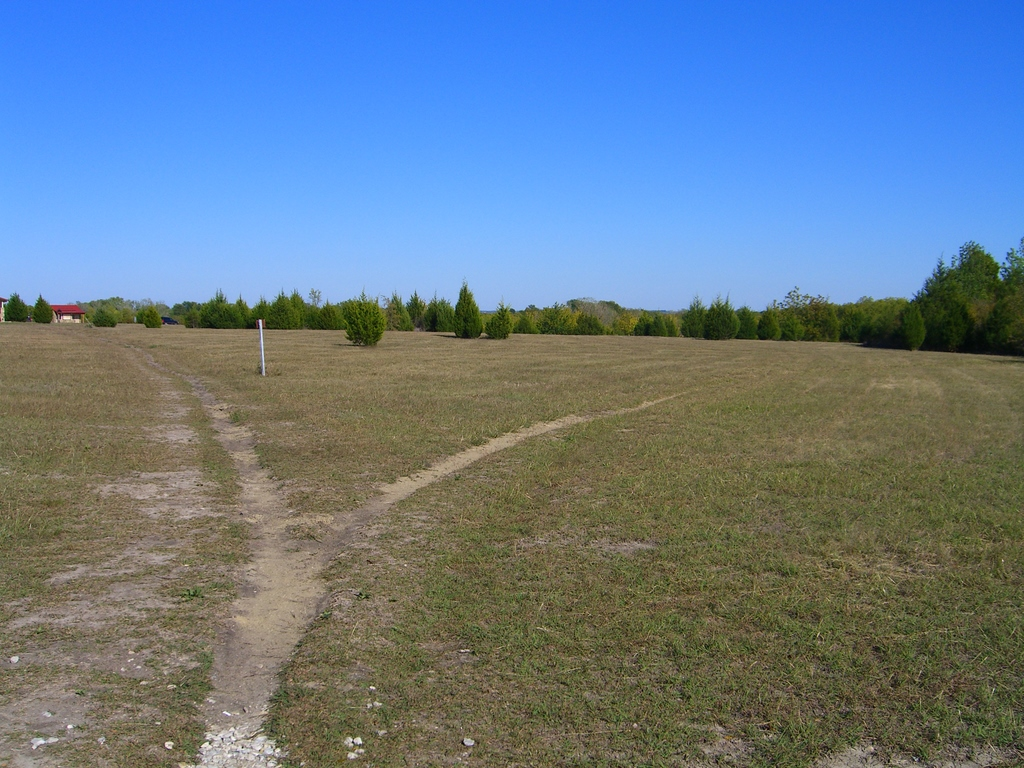
Sister Grove hiking trail looking north from the southern tree line

The hike and mountain bike trail, administered as a county park, features a leisurely stroll through the scraggle-woods common to this part of north Texas. Spring hiking on this trail permits one to see lush fields of honeysuckle, while winter hiking yields holly trees in full berry. Sightings of armadillo and raccoon may be made along the trail. A branch of the trail leads to nearby Lake Lavon.

This trail best suits the light day-hiker, as it is neither overly challenging nor overcrowded.

== Trinity Trails ==
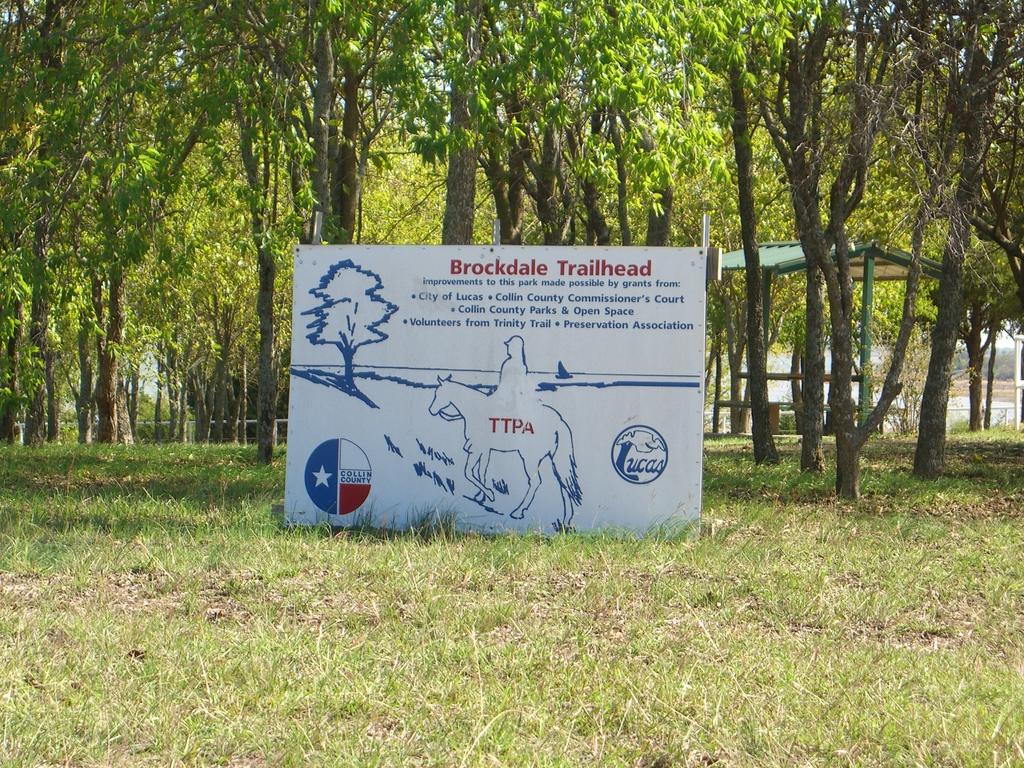
The trailhead at Brockdale Park

33°4′23.85″N 96°32′57.82″W
Trinity Trails is an equestrian and light hiking trail with trail heads located at Brockdale Park and East Fork Park adjacent to Lake Lavon near the communities of Lucas and Wylie. A restroom facility and picnic areas are available. The trail is managed and maintained by the Trinity Trail Preservation Association.
