= David McCall =

David McCall may refer to:

- David McCall (bishop)
- David McCall (businessman)
- David B. McCall, politician and businessman from Texas
- Dave McCall, rugby union player
- David McCall, creator of Schoolhouse Rock!
