= Culleoka, Texas =

- Populated place
- Location within Texas Location within the United States
- Coordinates: 33°7′52″N 96°29′30″W
- Country: United States
- State: Texas
- Counties: Collin

Area
  - Water: 0.0 sq mi (0 km^{2})
- Elevation: 551 ft (168 m)

Population (2000)
  - Total: 25
- Time zone: UTC-6 (Central (CST))
  - Summer (DST): UTC-5 (CDT)
- ZIP code: 75407
- Area codes: 214, 469, 972
- GNIS feature ID: 1333803

Culleoka is a populated place in Collin County, Texas, United States. It is located within the Dallas-Fort Worth Metroplex.

== History ==
The early settlers of Culleoka named the community for their hometown in Tennessee. It was established in the latter part of the 1880s after a general store was built in 1887. Twenty people were living there in 1892, and by 1900 a mill and cotton gin were running there. There was a post office at Culleoka from 1893 to 1906, catering to an estimated fifty residents. Following 1906, the community's mail was delivered to McKinney. The population of Culleoka increased to 150 during the ensuing several decades, and it stayed there until the late 1940s. The village had four churches and three or four businesses in the 1930s. The area had a downturn in the late 1940s, partly because of the expansion of Plano nearby and the disturbance brought about by the construction of Lavon Dam in 1954, which created a sizable reservoir. In 1990, the community continued to exist.

== Geography ==
Culleoka is located on a spur off of Farm to Market Road 982 near Lavon Lake, 10 mi (16 km) east of McKinney in east-central Collin County.

== Education ==
Culleoka had its own high school in the 1930s. Today the community is served by the Princeton Independent School District. It is zoned for Godwin and Harper Elementary Schools, Clark Middle School, and Princeton High School.
