= Biggers =

Biggers is an Old English surname, and derives from an Old Norse word for a Barley field. Notable people with the surname include:

- Caleb Biggers (born 1999), American football player
- Cliff Biggers, comic-book writer and journalist
- Clyde Biggers (1925–1976), American college football coach
- Dan Biggers (1931–2011), American television actor
- Earl Derr Biggers (1884–1933), American novelist and playwright
- E. J. Biggers (born 1987), American football cornerback
- Jackson Biggers (born 1937), American Anglican bishop
- Jeff Biggers (born 1963), American writer and journalist
- John T. Biggers (1924–2001), American muralist during the Harlem Renaissance
- Sissy Biggers (born 1957), American television personality
- Trenesha Biggers (born 1981), American professional wrestler
- W. Watts Biggers (1927–2013), American novelist and television writer
- William Biggers (1874–1935), English footballer
- Zeek Biggers (born 2003), American football player

Biggers can also refer to:

- Biggers, Arkansas, a town in Randolph County, Arkansas
- Biggers, Texas, a ghost town in Collin County, Texas
