= Snow Hill, Texas =

- Unincorporated community
- Location within Texas Location within the United States
- Coordinates: 33°15′21″N 96°23′03″W
- Country: United States
- State: Texas
- County: Collin
- Elevation: 574 ft (175 m)
- Time zone: UTC-6 (Central (CST))
  - Summer (DST): UTC-5 (CDT)
- GNIS feature ID: 2034660

Snow Hill is an unincorporated community in Collin County, located in the U.S. state of Texas. According to the Handbook of Texas, the community had a population of 20 in 2000. It is located within the Dallas-Fort Worth Metroplex.

== History ==
The area in what is known as Snow Hill today may have been named by a group of surveyors who stood on a ridge that was covered in snow. It had a church for its locals for a long time. From 1940 through 2000, the community's population was 20.

== Geography ==
Snow Hill is located on the highest point between the shore of Pilot and Indian Creeks near Texas State Highway 78, 10 mi (16 km) northeast of McKinney in northeastern Collin County.

== Education ==
Snow Hill once had its own school. Today, the community is served by the Blue Ridge Independent School District.

== Notable person ==
- David B. McCall, former mayor of Plano, was born here.
