= Culleoka =

Culleoka may refer to:

- Culleoka, Tennessee, an unincorporated community in Maury County, Tennessee
- Culleoka, Texas, a populated place in Collin County, Texas
