= Blue Ridge High School (Texas) =

Location
- 11020 CR 504; Blue Ridge, Texas 75424; United States; 33.3081°N 96.4041°W

Information
- Type: Public
- Motto: Learn...Grow...Excel...
- School district: Blue Ridge Independent School District
- Superintendent: Darrell Floyd
- Principal: Ms. Pam Clark
- Staff: 26.37 (FTE)
- Grades: 9 to 12
- Enrollment: 296 (2023-2024)
- Student to teacher ratio: 11.22
- Colors: Green and White
- Athletics conference: UIL Class 3A
- Team name: Tigers/Lady Tigers
- Website: Blue Ridge High School

Blue Ridge High School, also known as BRHS, is a public high school for students, grades 9-12, located in the town of Blue Ridge, Texas (United States). The school enrolls students in grades 9-12. The school colors are green and white, and the mascot is the Tiger. For the 2021-2022 school year, the school was given a "B" by the Texas Education Agency.

== Academics ==
The student to faculty ratio is approximately 10 to 1, and the average class size is 15 students.

Grades are weighted on a 4.0 scale.

=== Academic extra-curriculars ===
Students at the BRHS participate in numerous University Interscholastic League (UIL) sponsored competitions.

== Campus and facilities ==
Blue Ridge High School is an open campus containing several buildings.

== Athletics ==
The Blue Ridge Tigers compete in the following sports:

- Baseball
- Basketball
- Cross Country
- Football
- Golf
- Powerlifting
- Softball
- Tennis
- Track and Field
- Volleyball

=== Finalists ===
Blue Ridge team sports have advanced to play in four state tournaments:

- 1A State Semifinalists - Baseball 2000
- 1A State Finalists - Softball 2010
- 1A State Finalists - Baseball 2011
- 1A State Qualifiers - Boys Golf 2012

== See also ==
- List of high schools in Texas
