= Wilson Creek (Texas) =

Creek in northern Texas

Location
- Country: United States

Physical characteristics
- Source
  - location: Celina, Texas
- Mouth
  - location: East Fork of the Trinity River
  - coordinates: 34°11′06″N 96°38′18″W

Wilson Creek is a creek in Colin County, Texas.

== Course ==
The creek rises east of Celina and flows to the southeast for 23 miles. It passes under U.S. Route 380 and State Highway 75 before flowing through McKinney. The creek meets the East Fork of the Trinity River at Lavon Lake.

== Wilson Creek Trail ==
The 10-mile Wilson Creek Trail in McKinney joined the National Trails System in 2023.
