= Frognot, Texas =

- Unincorporated community
- Location within Texas Location within the United States
- Coordinates: 33°18′13″N 96°21′35″W
- Country: United States
- State: Texas
- County: Collin
- Elevation: 610 ft (190 m)
- Time zone: UTC-6 (Central (CST))
  - Summer (DST): UTC-5 (CDT)
- GNIS feature ID: 1379811

Frognot is an unincorporated community east of Blue Ridge on FM 981 in Collin County, located in the U.S. state of Texas.

== History ==
=== Frognot Store ===
In 1926, Otis and Hazel Dixon opened Frognot General Store, where they sold Sinclair gasoline for 10 cents a gallon, as well as salt, bread, milk, and sometimes vegetables from their own garden. They also sold Black Angus beef from the livestock raised by Otis, long before Black Angus was known as a premium product. The store was a gathering place for local folk, and where the idea of starting Frognot Water Supply Corporation was born. The store has been closed since the late 1980s.
