= Shepton =

Shepton may refer to:

- Shepton, Texas, area within Plano, Texas, United States that was formerly a distinct community
- Shepton Beauchamp, village and civil parish in the South Somerset district of Somerset, England
- Shepton Mallet, small rural town and civil parish in the Mendip district of Somerset, England
- HM Prison Shepton Mallet, a former prison located in Shepton Mallet, Somerset, England
- Shepton Montague, village and civil parish in Somerset, England
