= Verona, Texas =

- Ghost town
- Location within Texas Location within the United States
- Coordinates: 33°15′12″N 96°26′08″W
- Country: United States
- State: Texas
- County: Collin
- Elevation: 594 ft (181 m)
- Time zone: UTC-6 (Central (CST))
  - Summer (DST): UTC-5 (CDT)
- GNIS feature ID: 1380719

Verona is a ghost town in Collin County, located in the U.S. state of Texas. It is located within the Dallas-Fort Worth Metroplex.

== History ==
The area in what is now known as Verona today was first settled in the 1870s. When A.R. Womble built a general store to serve local farmers in the community in 1872, Verona was officially organized. A gristmill and cotton gin were established sometime after. A post office was established at Verona on September 27, 1876, and remained in operation until November 1901, when mail was rerouted from Farmersville. It had a population of 75 in 1890, which went down to 25 in 1933.

== Geography ==
Verona is located near Pilot Grove Creek, 8 mi (13 km) northeast of McKinney in northeastern Collin County.

== Education ==
Verona once had its own school. Today the community is served by the Blue Ridge Independent School District.
