= Walnut Grove, Collin County, Texas =

Unincorporated community in Collin County, Texas, United States

Walnut Grove, Texas
- Unincorporated community
- Country: United States
- State: Texas
- County: Collin
- Time zone: UTC-6 (Central (CST))
  - Summer (DST): UTC-5 (CDT)
- GNIS feature ID: 2033790

Walnut Grove is an unincorporated community in Collin County, Texas, United States.

== Description ==
The community is located along Wilson Creeek and Farm to Market Road 2478 (approximately 8-mile [13 km] northwest of McKinney) and is now mostly within the city limits of Prosper.

== History ==
The community was first settled 1844 by the Searcy family, who had migrated from Kentucky. In the ensuing several years, more pioneers moved to area from Kentucky and Missouri. Soon a Presbyterian church was established, as well as a cemetery by 1863 (the year on the earliest marked graves). A school was established by the 1900s. However, for most of its history, Walnut Grove remained a rural farming community. Recently it has become more of bedroom community.

In 1976, the Walnut Grove Presbyterian Church was designated as a Texas Historic Landmark. The historic marker states:

Organized in 1846 by the Rev. J.N. Vance, this fellowship was first called Union Congregation. In 1858 the name was changed to Walnut Grove. The first church building on this property, donated by D.M. Crutchfield, was erected in 1869. Camp meetings were often held on the church grounds. Today the congregation worships in this frame country church, built in 1886 and remodeled in 1968.

== See also ==
- List of unincorporated communities in Texas
