= Joseph W. Shepard =

Joseph William Shepard, also known as J. W. Shepard (November 19, 1856 - December 7, 1946), was a pioneer in Collin County, Texas.

He was the son of Lewis Shepard and Mary Ann Huffman. He married Mollie Cathering Haggard and together they had six children.

Shepard owned a thousand-acre (4 km^{2}) ranch in the Collin County area. The Plano area became famous in the late 19th century for mule breeding. Shepard became well known for this and also for breeding registered horses and jacks. He shipped his mules throughout the United States, and to Mexico and Honduras.

In 1890, Shepard opened a general store on his ranch, and the farming town of Shepton developed in the vicinity of the store.

Shepard served on the local school board, the local church and was a civic leader in the area. In addition to the town of Shepton, Texas, Shepard Elementary School and Shepton High School were also named in his honor.

== Sources ==
- Shepton, Texas from the Handbook of Texas Online
- Shepton High School History
- City of Plano Historic Week Facts
- Mallory, Randy Heritage in a High-Tech Town: Historic Downtown Plano Texas Highways
