= Rhea Mills, Texas =

Rhea Mills
- Unincorporated place
- Location within the state of Texas Rhea Mills (the United States)
- Coordinates: 33°15′44″N 96°43′58″W
- Country: United States
- State: Texas
- Counties: Collin

Area
  - Water: 0.0 sq mi (0 km^{2})
- Elevation: 730 ft (222.5 m)

Population (2000)
  - Total: 47
- Time zone: UTC-6 (Central (CST))
  - Summer (DST): UTC-5 (CDT)
- ZIP code: 75078
- Area codes: 214, 469, 972
- GNIS feature ID: 1380436

Rhea Mills is an unincorporated farming community in Collin County, Texas, United States. According to the Handbook of Texas, the community had a population of 47 in 2000. It is located within the Dallas-Fort Worth Metroplex.

== History ==
The area in what is known as Rhea Mills today was first settled in 1857. W.A. and J.C. Rhea built a flour and cornmill here. It was originally named Rhea's Mills, but it was changed to simply Rhea Mills in early 1982. A post office was established at Rhea Mills in 1876 and remained in operation until 1907 when mail was rerouted from McKinney. It has served as a trade and supply center for local farmers for most of its existence. It has never had more than 100 people since 1990, and from 1942 through that year, its population was less than 50. It went down to 47 in 2000.

On April 22, 1968, an F1 tornado struck Rhea Mills.

== Geography ==
Rhea Mills is located at the intersection of Farm to Market Roads 2478 and 1461, 6 mi (9.7 km) northwest of McKinney in northwestern Collin County.

== Education ==
Today the community is served by the Prosper Independent School District. It is zoned for Cynthia A. Cockrell and Mike and Janie Reeves Elementary Schools, Lorene Rogers Middle School, and Walnut Grove High School.

== Sources ==
- National Weather Service (April 1968). Storm Data Publication (Report). National Centers for Environmental Information – via Storm Events Database.
