= Chambersville, Texas =

- Unincorporated community
- Location within Texas Location within the United States
- Coordinates: 33°18′22″N 96°38′09″W
- Country: United States
- State: Texas
- County: Collin
- Founded: 1847
- Elevation: 653 ft (199 m)
- Time zone: UTC-6 (Central (CST))
  - Summer (DST): UTC-5 (CDT)
- GNIS feature ID: 1379530

Chambersville is an unincorporated community in Collin County, located in the U.S. state of Texas. According to the Handbook of Texas, the community had a population of 40 in 2000. It is located within the Dallas-Fort Worth Metroplex.

== History ==
Chambersville was named for Elisha Chambers, who relocated to the area from North Carolina in 1847. He received a land grant from Peter's Colony for 320 acres (130 ha) of land along the east fork of the Trinity River in 1850. Three years later, he gave land to build a church and cemetery. A post office was established at Chambersville in 1894 and remained in operation until 1903, with Jacob Bryan serving as postmaster. In 1903, mail was routed to McKinney. Its population was 40 from the 1950s through 2000.

On April 22, 1968, an F1 tornado struck Chambersville.

== Geography ==
Chambersville is located on Farm to Market Road 543 overlooking the Blackland Prairies, 7 mi (11 km) north of McKinney in northwestern Collin County.

== Education ==
Chambersville had its own school in 1853. Today the community is served by the McKinney Independent School District. It is zoned for Naomi Press Elementary School, Scott Morgan Johnson Middle School, and McKinney North High School.

== Sources ==
- National Weather Service (April 1968). "Storm Data and Unusual Weather Phenomena". Storm Data. 10 (4). Asheville, North Carolina: National Climatic Data Center.
- National Weather Service (April 1968). Storm Data Publication (Report). National Centers for Environmental Information – via Storm Events Database.
