= Forest Grove, Texas =

- Unincorporated community
- Location within Texas Location within the United States
- Coordinates: 33°07′12″N 96°36′33″W
- Country: United States
- State: Texas
- County: Collin
- Elevation: 610 ft (190 m)
- Time zone: UTC-6 (Central (CST))
  - Summer (DST): UTC-5 (CDT)
- GNIS feature ID: 1378310

Forest Grove is an unincorporated community in Collin County, located in the U.S. state of Texas. According to the Handbook of Texas, the community had a population of 20 in 1990. It is located within the Dallas-Fort Worth Metroplex.

== History ==
The area in what is known as Forest Grove today was first settled around 1858 along the shore of White Rock Creek and has served as a church community for local farmers. It had a population of 20 in 1990. It is now located within the Allen city limits.

== Geography ==
Forest Grove is located on Farm to Market Road 1378, 6 mi (9.7 km) south of McKinney in south-central Collin County.

== Education ==
Forest Grove once had its own school. Today the community is served by the Lovejoy Independent School District. It is zoned for Robert L. Puster Elementary School, Sloan Intermediate School, Willow Springs Middle School, and Lovejoy High School.
