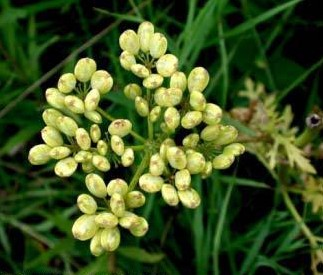

Conservation status
- Secure (NatureServe)

Scientific classification
- Kingdom: Plantae
- Clade: Tracheophytes
- Clade: Angiosperms
- Clade: Eudicots
- Clade: Asterids
- Order: Apiales
- Family: Apiaceae
- Genus: Polytaenia
- Species: P. nuttallii

Binomial name
- Polytaenia nuttallii DC.

= Polytaenia nuttallii =

Species of flowering plant

Polytaenia nuttallii is a species of flowering plant in the carrot family known by the common name Nuttall's prairie parsley, or simply prairie parsley. It is native to the central and midwestern United States.

This plant is a biennial or perennial herb growing up to 1 meter tall. The inflorescence is made up of many small yellow flowers borne in umbels. The leaves are up to 18 centimeters long and are divided into toothed lobes. They clasp the stem at their bases. They are mostly alternately arranged, but the upper ones can be oppositely arranged. The plant is yellowish in color during spring and summer.

This plant can be found in prairies, glades, and open woods. In some areas it is very common on roadsides.

This species is used in habitat restoration projects in prairies and it may be planted as an ornamental.
