= Wetsel, Texas =

- Unincorporated community
- Location within Texas Location within the United States
- Coordinates: 33°07′46″N 96°38′40″W
- Country: United States
- State: Texas
- County: Collin
- Elevation: 669 ft (204 m)
- Time zone: UTC-6 (Central (CST))
  - Summer (DST): UTC-5 (CDT)
- GNIS feature ID: 1379260

Wetsel is an unincorporated community in Collin County, located in the U.S. state of Texas. It is located within the Dallas-Fort Worth Metroplex.

== History ==
It may never have included more than a few houses when it was said to have been founded in the late nineteenth century. Henry Wetsel, a prominent McKinney merchant and early settler, is honored by the community's name. Wetsel eventually sold his holdings in McKinney and headrighted a square mile of land south of the town. Wetsel had built and run an early grist and flour mill in the county seat. On the stage route that connected Austin and McKinney, he built a cottage. Allen now includes the former Wetsel area.

== Geography ==
Wetsel is located inside the Allen city limits, 5 mi (8.0 km) southwest of McKinney in southwestern Collin County.

== Education ==
Today the community is served by the Allen Independent School District. It is zoned for James and Margie Marion Elementary School, Walter & Lois Curtis Middle School, and Allen High School.
