= Altoga, Texas =

- Unincorporated community
- Location within the state of Texas Altoga, Texas (the United States)
- Coordinates: 33°14′59″N 96°29′22″W
- Country: United States
- State: Texas
- County: Collin
- Elevation: 554 ft (169 m)
- Time zone: UTC-6 (Central (CST))
  - Summer (DST): UTC-5 (CDT)
- Area codes: 214, 469, & 972
- GNIS feature ID: 1372286

Altoga is an unincorporated community in Collin County, in the U.S. state of Texas. According to the Handbook of Texas, the community had a population of 367 in 2000. It is located within the Dallas-Fort Worth Metroplex.

== History ==
Dock Owensby wanted this community to have a motto, so he suggested: "all together". In 1910, Altoga had seven stores, two cotton gins, and a brass band. A post office was established at Altoga in 1889 and remained in operation until 1937, with a brief interruption from 1900 to 1915. There is debate about whether the population was 50 or 133 in 1915. It rose to 250 in 1929, then was reduced to 150 in 1941. Only four businesses remained in 1937. The population plummeted to 50 in 1970. Due to the growth of nearby McKinney, the population jumped to 358 in 1980 and further increased to 367 from 1990 through 2000.

== Geography ==
Altoga is located on Farm to Market Road 1827, 10 mi (16 km) northeast of McKinney in northeastern Collin County.

== Education ==
Altoga had its own school in 1910. Today the community is served by the McKinney Independent School District. It is zoned for Webb Elementary School, Scott Morgan Johnson Middle School, and McKinney North High School.
