= David B. McCall =

American businessman and fraudster (1924–2004)

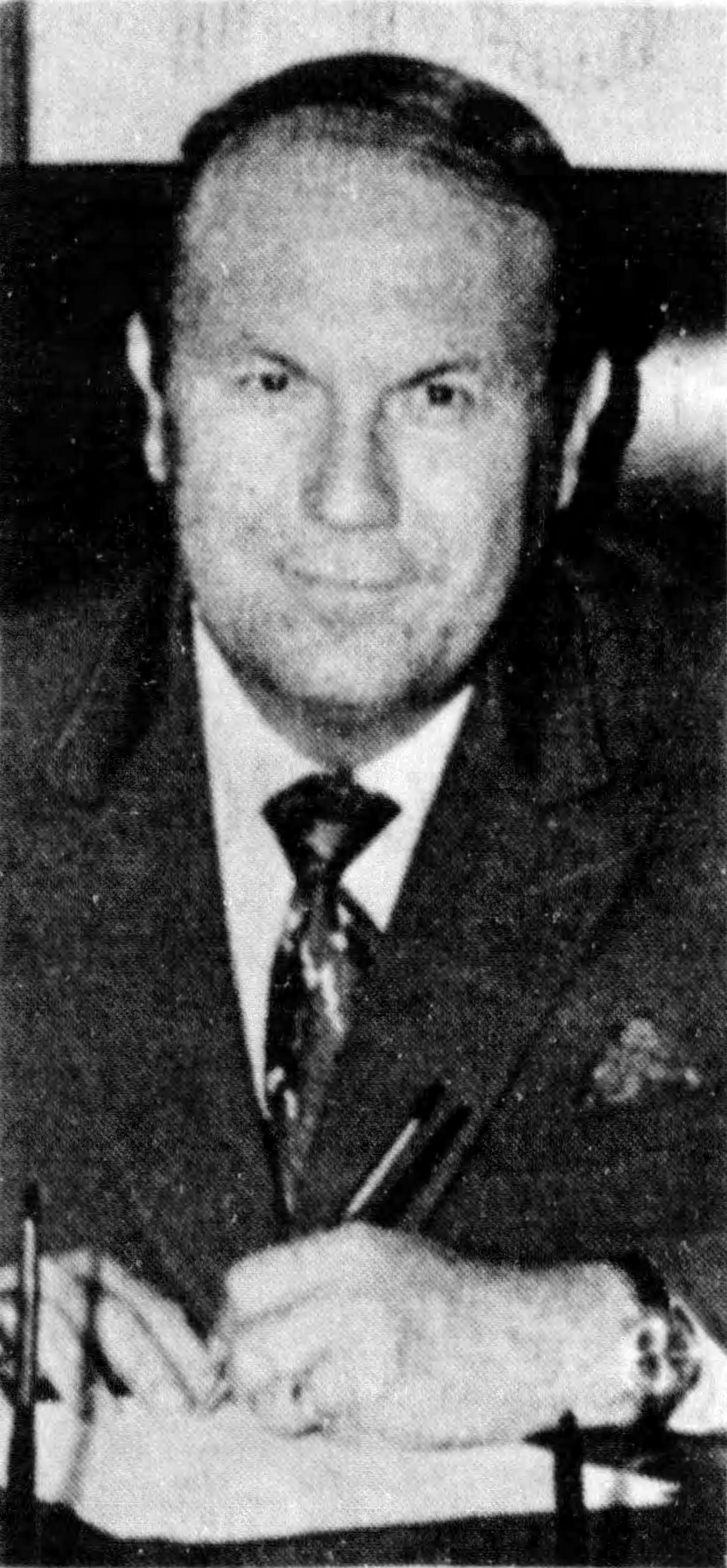
McCall in 1972

David B. McCall Jr. (March 31, 1924 – February 17, 2004) was an American banker and politician who served as the Mayor of Plano, Texas, from 1956 to 1960. In his business career, McCall founded and served as the CEO of the Plano Savings and Loan Association for over 25 years before its collapse in 1989. In 1997, McCall was convicted of fraud for creating $25 million in fraudulent loan records and was sentenced to 5 years in prison. Days before he died in 2004, McCall was given a presidential pardon by President George W. Bush.

== Early life ==
McCall was born in 1924 in the unincorporated community of Snow Hill, just north of Farmersville, in Collin County, Texas. He earned degrees from Louisiana Tech University and Southern Methodist University. After college, McCall joined the United States Marine Corps. When his service in the Marines concluded, McCall and his wife Nellie moved to Plano in 1946 when the city's population was approximately 1,500 people. He was an elementary school principal and basketball coach from 1952 to 1955.

== Business career ==
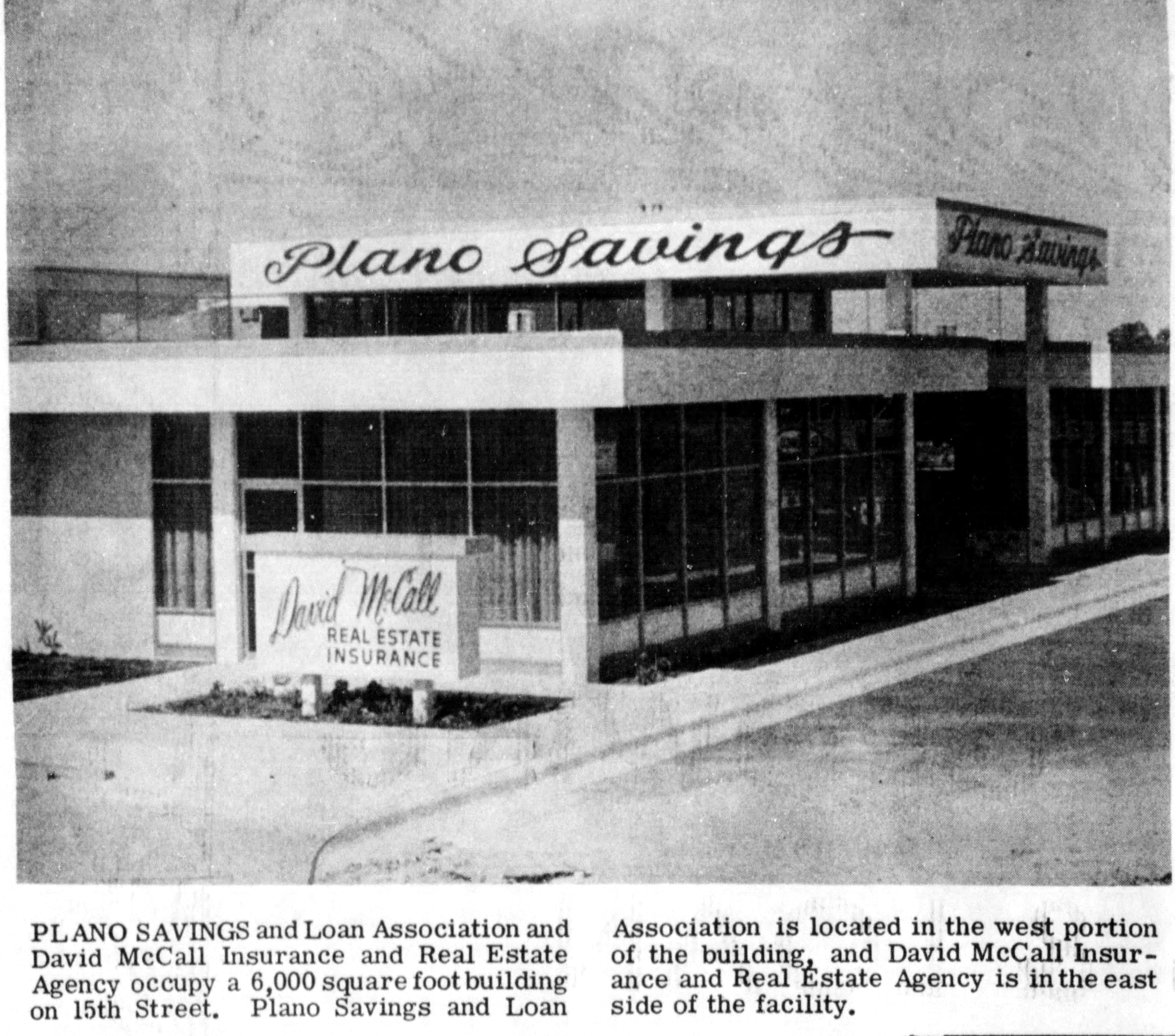
Plano Savings and Loan Association and David McCall Insurance and Real Estate Agency, in 1972

In 1955, McCall purchased an insurance agency in Plano. He later established the Plano Savings and Loan Association in 1963 and served as its chairman and CEO for 26 years until the bank's dissolution in 1989 during the savings and loan crisis. He was also part of a group that purchased a controlling interest in First National Bank of Plano, for which he served as chairman of the board for 13 years.

== Political career ==
McCall served as the mayor of Plano from 1956 to 1960. He won his first election in 1956 by a vote of 276 to 60. During McCall's tenure, the city's population doubled and the city installed its 1,000th telephone.

== Criminal charges ==
In August 1995, McCall and four other defendants, including Jack Harvard (Plano's mayor from 1982 to 1990) were indicted for allegedly orchestrating a scheme to transfer troublesome loans from one bank to another. Prosecutors alleged that the defendants wished to hide the bank's difficulties from bank examiners. On October 10, 1996, McCall pleaded guilty and he was sentenced to 5 years in prison, 90 days of home confinement, and 5 years of probation. He was also ordered to pay $100,000 in restitution. McCall served 6 months in prison before being released. Harvard pleaded guilty and was sentenced to 2 years in prison.

=== Presidential pardon ===
Four days before McCall's death, he was granted a presidential pardon by President George W. Bush. U.S. Senator Kay Bailey Hutchinson and Congressman Ralph Hall provided character references for McCall's pardon application. McCall's was the eighth time that Bush had used his pardon power. The McCall family's relationships with Bush administration officials, including Attorney General Alberto Gonzalez, led to questions about favoritism. The pardon process was completed in only two to three business days. U.S. attorney for the Eastern District of Texas Matthew Orwig initially opposed the pardon because proper procedure was not followed.

== Personal life ==
McCall and his wife had two sons, both of whom were involved in Texas politics. Brian McCall represented the Plano area in the Texas House of Representatives from 1990 to 2010 before resigning to become the chancellor of the Texas State University System. David McCall III was the first chairman of Dallas Area Rapid Transit (DART), the transit agency serving the Dallas–Fort Worth metroplex. In February 2004, Plano dedicated a downtown plaza honoring McCall five days before McCall was pardoned by President Bush. He was nicknamed "Mr. Plano."
