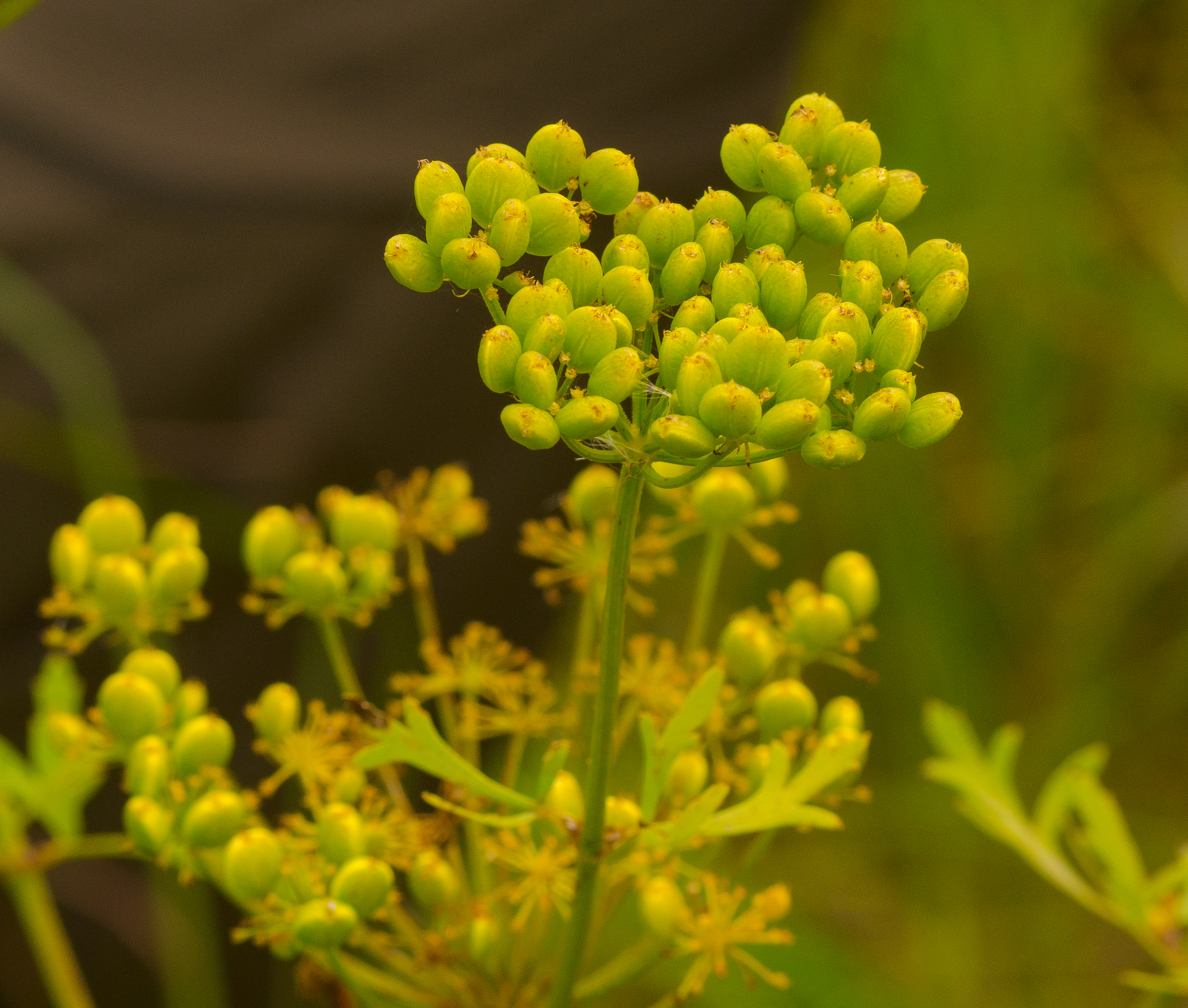
- Polytaenia nuttallii

Scientific classification
- Kingdom: Plantae
- Clade: Tracheophytes
- Clade: Angiosperms
- Clade: Eudicots
- Clade: Asterids
- Order: Apiales
- Family: Apiaceae
- Subfamily: Apioideae
- Tribe: Selineae
- Genus: Polytaenia; DC.

= Polytaenia =

Genus of flowering plants

Polytaenia is a genus of flowering plants belonging to the family Apiaceae.

Its native range is the central and south-eastern the United States.

Species:

- Polytaenia albiflora E.L.Keith
- Polytaenia nuttallii DC.
- Polytaenia texana (J.M.Coult. & Rose) Mathias & Constance
