= Roland, Texas =

- Ghost town
- Location within Texas Location within the United States
- Coordinates: 33°16′42″N 96°38′58″W
- Country: United States
- State: Texas
- County: Collin
- Elevation: 630 ft (190 m)
- Time zone: UTC-6 (Central (CST))
  - Summer (DST): UTC-5 (CDT)
- GNIS feature ID: 1380454

Roland is a ghost town in Collin County, located in the U.S. state of Texas. It is located within the Dallas-Fort Worth Metroplex.

== History ==
Named after one of Charlemagne's lieutenants, it was founded by Lite T. Morris in the 1850s. Apparently, Liberty Springs was another name for it. Roland had a grocery store, a cotton gin, and 68 residents in 1900. From 1887 until 1903, W. J. Manard's general store contained a post office, with Thomas S. Webb serving as its first postmaster. The population was reported at that level into the 1940s, at which point no more figures were available. By 1910, it was 36, and by the 1930s, it was 25.

== Geography ==
Roland is located 6 mi (9.7 km) northwest of McKinney in northwestern Collin County.

== Education ==
Today the community is served by the McKinney Independent School District. It is zoned for Naomi Press Elementary School, Scott Morgan Johnson Middle School, and McKinney North High School.
