= Lolaville, Texas =

- Unincorporated community
- Location within Texas Location within the United States
- Coordinates: 33°05′50″N 96°48′19″W
- Country: United States
- State: Texas
- County: Collin
- Elevation: 705 ft (215 m)
- Time zone: UTC-6 (Central (CST))
  - Summer (DST): UTC-5 (CDT)
- GNIS feature ID: 1378594

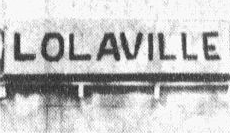
Sign from fruit stand in Lolaville, TX

Lolaville was an unincorporated community in Collin County, located in the U.S. state of Texas, near the present-day border between Plano and Frisco. It flourished in the early part of the 20th century but had all but disappeared by the late 1950s, as Texas State Highway 121 passed through the site of the community. After subsequent road expansion required the demolition of most of the houses, all that remained was a roadside fruit stand, for which Lola only charged a pittance of rent. The fruit stand displayed a sign bearing the name "Lolaville".

The remnants of the community disappeared during the 1990s, when the land was redeveloped.

Lolaville was named after Lola Kelsey Dunafan, whose father owned several hundred acres in the vicinity, including the site of present-day Stonebriar Mall. The particular four acres that became Lolaville were acquired in 1928. Lola's husband, Ernest, built a general store and several houses to be rented to black farming families. The black community was serviced by a segregated school at which Lola taught. After her parents died and were buried in Rowlett Creek Cemetery, Lola inherited the land and continued to live in her own hamlet until she retired to a nursing home and sold the land to developers in 1988. The transaction was brokered by Wayne Pickering, who was sentenced to 2 1/2 years in prison for bank fraud.
