= Marilee, Texas =

- Ghost town
- Location within Texas Location within the United States
- Coordinates: 33°24′13″N 96°45′41″W
- Country: United States
- State: Texas
- County: Collin
- Elevation: 692 ft (211 m)
- Time zone: UTC-6 (Central (CST))
  - Summer (DST): UTC-5 (CDT)
- GNIS feature ID: 1380142

Marilee is a ghost town in Collin County, located in the U.S. state of Texas. It is located within the Dallas-Fort Worth Metroplex.

== History ==
Marilee has never had more than 50 people living in it. It had a business and only 20 residents from the early 1930s to the late 1940s, but no further population was ever recorded.

== Geography ==
Marilee is located on the Burlington Northern Railroad near the Grayson County line, 5 mi (8.0 km) north of Celina in far-northwestern Collin County.

== Education ==
Marilee is located within the Celina Independent School District.
