= Rockhill, Texas =

- Unincorporated community
- Location within Texas Location within the United States
- Coordinates: 33°12′14″N 96°48′09″W
- Country: United States
- State: Texas
- County: Collin
- Elevation: 735 ft (224 m)
- Time zone: UTC-6 (Central (CST))
  - Summer (DST): UTC-5 (CDT)
- GNIS feature ID: 1378974

Rockhill is an unincorporated community in Collin County, located in the U.S. state of Texas. According to the Handbook of Texas, the community had a population of 25 in 1990. It is located within the Dallas-Fort Worth Metroplex.

== Geography ==
Rockhill is located on Texas State Highway 289, 4 mi (6.4 km) north of Frisco in far-western Collin County. It is now located within the Frisco city limits.

== Education ==
Rockhill once had its own school. Today the community is served by the Prosper Independent School District. It is zoned for Jim Spradley Elementary School, Bill Hayes and Daniel L. Jones Middle Schools, and Rock Hill High School.
