= Fayburg, Texas =

- Unincorporated community
- Location within Texas Location within the United States
- Coordinates: 33°16′09″N 96°23′16″W
- Country: United States
- State: Texas
- County: Collin
- Elevation: 594 ft (181 m)
- Time zone: UTC-6 (Central (CST))
  - Summer (DST): UTC-5 (CDT)
- GNIS feature ID: 1379760

Fayburg is an unincorporated community in Collin County, located in the U.S. state of Texas.
