= Lavon Dam =

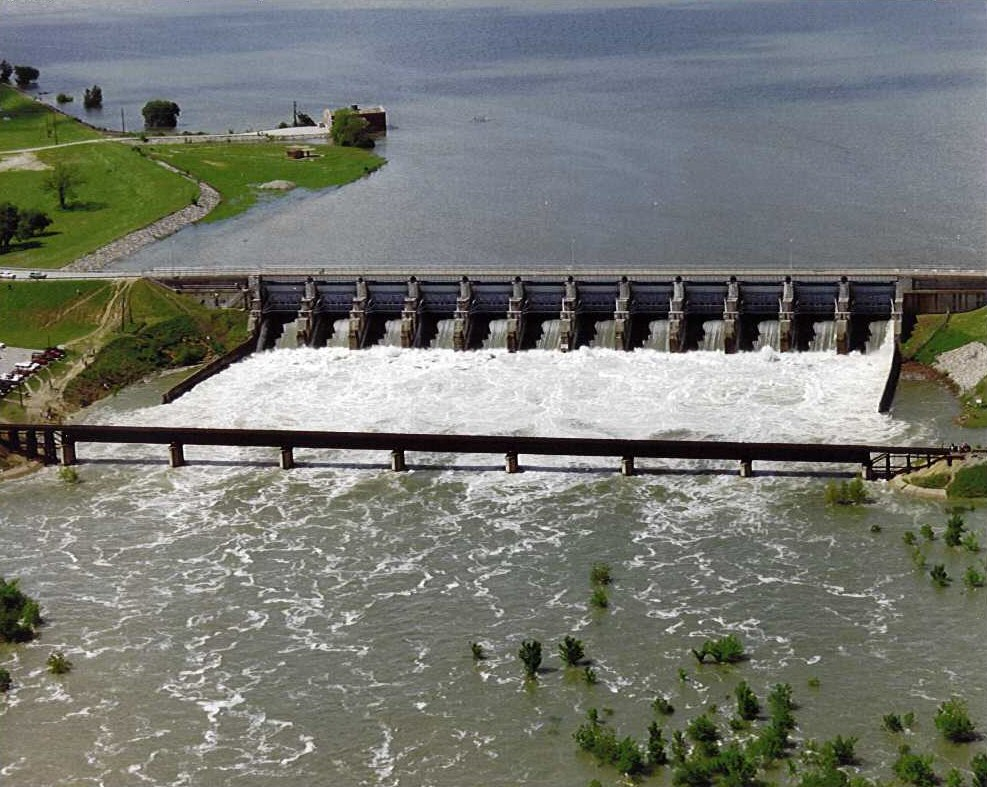
- Aerial view of Lavon Dam
- Interactive map of Lavon Dam
- Country: United States
- Location: Collin County, Texas
- Coordinates: 33°1′57″N 96°28′2″W
- Status: In use
- Construction began: January, 1948
- Opening date: September 1953
- Construction cost: $88,351,248.00
- Owners: The U.S. government, operated by the U.S. Army Corps of Engineers, Fort Worth District

Dam and spillways
- Type of dam: Rolled earthfill
- Impounds: East Fork of the Trinity River
- Height: 81 ft (25 m)
- Length: 19,493 ft (5,941 m)
- Width (crest): 475.5 ft (144.9 m)
- Dam volume: 17,055,000 yd^{3} (13,039,000 m^{3})
- Spillway type: Ogee crest
- Spillway capacity: 1,507,000 cu ft/s (42,700 m^{3}/s)

Reservoir
- Creates: Lavon Reservoir
- Total capacity: 409,360 acre⋅ft (0.50494 km^{3})
- Surface area: 20,559 acres (8,320 ha)

Lavon Dam is located in Collin County, Texas on the East Fork of the Trinity River, about 3 miles east of Wylie and 22 miles northeast of Dallas. It was constructed to create the Lavon Lake and is named after the town of Lavon. Dams are generally named after the closest town near the structure.

== History ==
Construction on the Lavon Dam began in January, 1948, and was completed in March, 1953. Deliberate impoundment began on September 14, 1953. The cost of the project was $18,554,570. On May 15, 1970, construction began on a modification of Lavon Dam that increased the conservation storage pool from elevation 472.0 feet to the current elevation of 492.0 feet by raising the top of the dam 12 feet. The modification was completed and deliberate impoundment began December 1, 1975. The cost of the modification was $69,796,678, which brought the grand total cost to $88,351,248.
