= Shepton, Plano, Texas =

Coordinates: 33°01′38″N 96°47′41″W

Shepton is an area within Plano, Texas, United States that was formerly a distinct community.

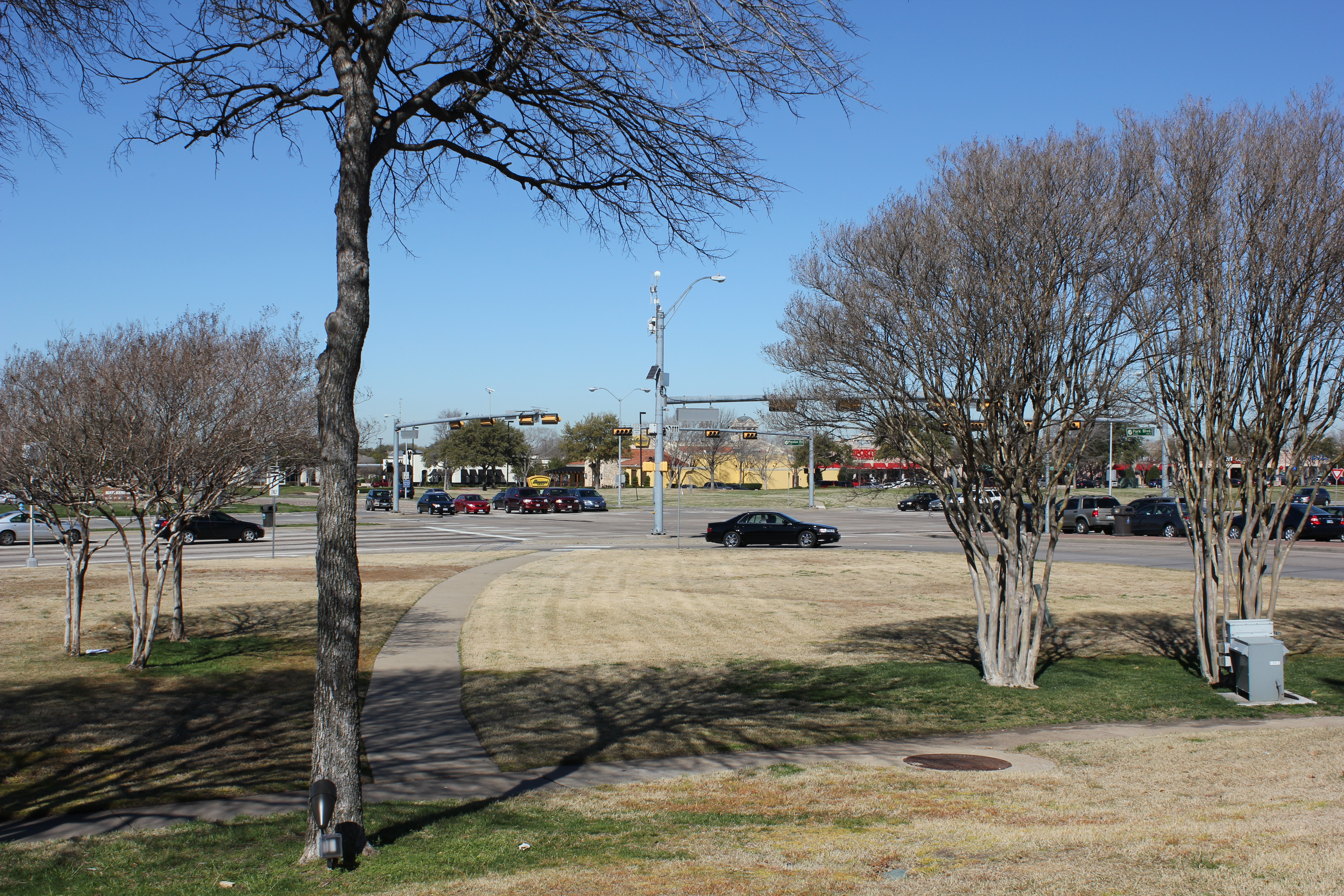
Intersection near what was Shepton

Shepton was founded circa 1890, when Joseph W. Shepard opened a general store ten miles southwest of McKinney, with the town deriving its name from Shepard's. From 1894 to 1903, Shepton had a post office, but most residents migrated over the years to nearby Plano, also in southwestern Collin County, with the growing Plano absorbing the area of the former community by the 1980s.

Shepton High School is named after the town of Shepton.
