= Biggers, Texas =

- Ghost town
- Location within Texas Location within the United States
- Coordinates: 33°11′48″N 96°32′48″W
- Country: United States
- State: Texas
- County: Collin
- Elevation: 617 ft (188 m)
- Time zone: UTC-6 (Central (CST))
  - Summer (DST): UTC-5 (CDT)
- GNIS feature ID: 2034675

Biggers is a ghost town in Collin County, located in the U.S. state of Texas.

== Background ==
Biggers was five miles east of the site of present McKinney in central Collin County. Settlement occurred sometime in the early 1890s, after the construction of the Biggers-Allen Mill in the late 1880s. By 1899, a general store and post office operated at the site with Wade Biggers as postmaster. The population of the settlement never exceeded 25, however, and the post office closed in 1903. The community continued to exist until sometime in the early 1950s.
