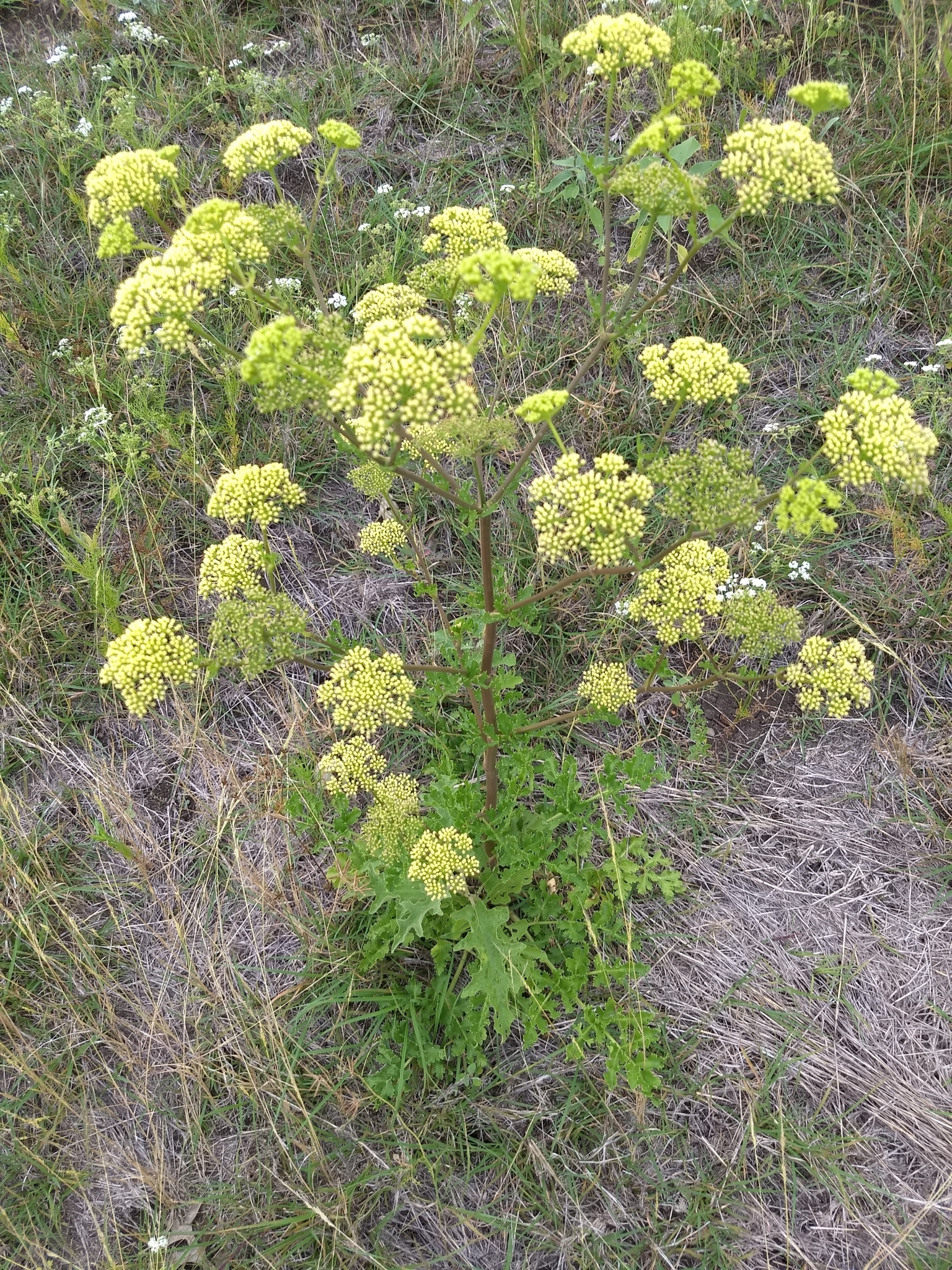

Scientific classification
- Kingdom: Plantae
- Clade: Tracheophytes
- Clade: Angiosperms
- Clade: Eudicots
- Clade: Asterids
- Order: Apiales
- Family: Apiaceae
- Genus: Polytaenia
- Species: P. texana

Binomial name
- Polytaenia texana (J.M.Coult. & Rose) Mathias & Constance

Synonyms
- Phanerotaenia texana (J.M. Coult. & Rose) H. St. John; Pleiotaenia nuttallii var. texana (J.M. Coult. & Rose) J.M. Coult. & Rose; Polytaenia nuttallii var. texana J.M. Coult. & Rose

= Polytaenia texana =

Species of flowering plant

Polytaenia texana, commonly known as Texas prairie parsley, is a species of flowering plant in the carrot family (Apiaceae). It is native to Texas and Oklahoma in the United States.
