= McKinney Courier-Gazette =

Newspaper in McKinney, Texas

- Type: Daily newspaper
- Format: Broadsheet
- Owner: 1013 Communications
- Editor: Chris Beattie
- Headquarters: 4005 West University McKinney, Texas 75071 USA
- Circulation: Online and print
- Price: Free
- Website: McKinney Courier-Gazette

The McKinney Courier-Gazette is a weekly newspaper published in McKinney, Texas, covering Collin County. It is published under the heading Star Local Media on Fridays.

1013 Communications acquired it from American Community Newspapers in 2011.

The newspaper has a weekly print circulation as well as daily online contribution.
