= Plano Star-Courier =

Daily newspaper serving Plano, Texas, US

The Plano Star-Courier is a daily newspaper serving the Plano, Texas. Established in 1902 by the merger of the Plano Star and the Plano Courier, it is the only newspaper in Plano.

== History ==
The Plano Star-Courier began publishing in 1902 after the merger of the Plano Star (established 1889) and the Plano Courier (established 1891).

On January 4, 1911, the Star-Courier's printing plant was destroyed in a fire. During the mid-1930s, the newspaper moved its plant to 1015 30th Street. The newspaper later acquired a Babcock flatbed printing press, which was used to print the newspaper until March 1960.

The Star-Courier launched its website and a digital edition in 1996.

In 2009, the daily and Sunday print circulation was 4,871. The newspaper is Plano's only newspaper.

=== Ownership ===
The newspaper remained under local ownership until 1973, when owners Louise Bagwill Sherrill and Scott Dorsey sold to Taylor Communications. Taylor then sold the Star-Courier to Harte Hank in 1986, before its sale to the E. W. Scripps Company in 1997.

On November 11, 1998, Scripps agreed to sell the Star-Courier, along with seven other Texas newspapers, to Lionheart Holdings, a community newspaper group. The sale would enable Scripps to focus on its other businesses. SAW Advisors, owned by Star Local Media CEO and Publisher Scott Wright, purchased Star Local Media, the holding company for the Star-Courier and 13 other community newspapers in October 2016. Rick and Elizabeth Rogers of 121 Media then bought Star Local Media in January 2022.

== See also ==
- List of newspapers in Texas
