= David McCall (businessman) =

Scottish businessman

David Slesser McCall CBE (born 3 December 1934) is a Scottish businessman and former broadcasting executive. He was Chief Executive of Anglia Television in Norwich throughout the 1980s and most of the 1990s.

== Career ==
From 1959-61 he did his National Service.

=== Anglia Television ===
He joined Anglia Television Limited in Norwich in 1968, becoming Chief Executive in 1976. From 1986-94 he was also Chief Executive of Anglia Television Group, and Chairman from 1994-98. He retired as Chairman of Anglia Television in May 2001.

He became a Fellow of the Royal Television Society in 1988. He is a former president of the (CTBF).

=== Channel 4 ===
In the early 1980s he helped to establish Channel 4.

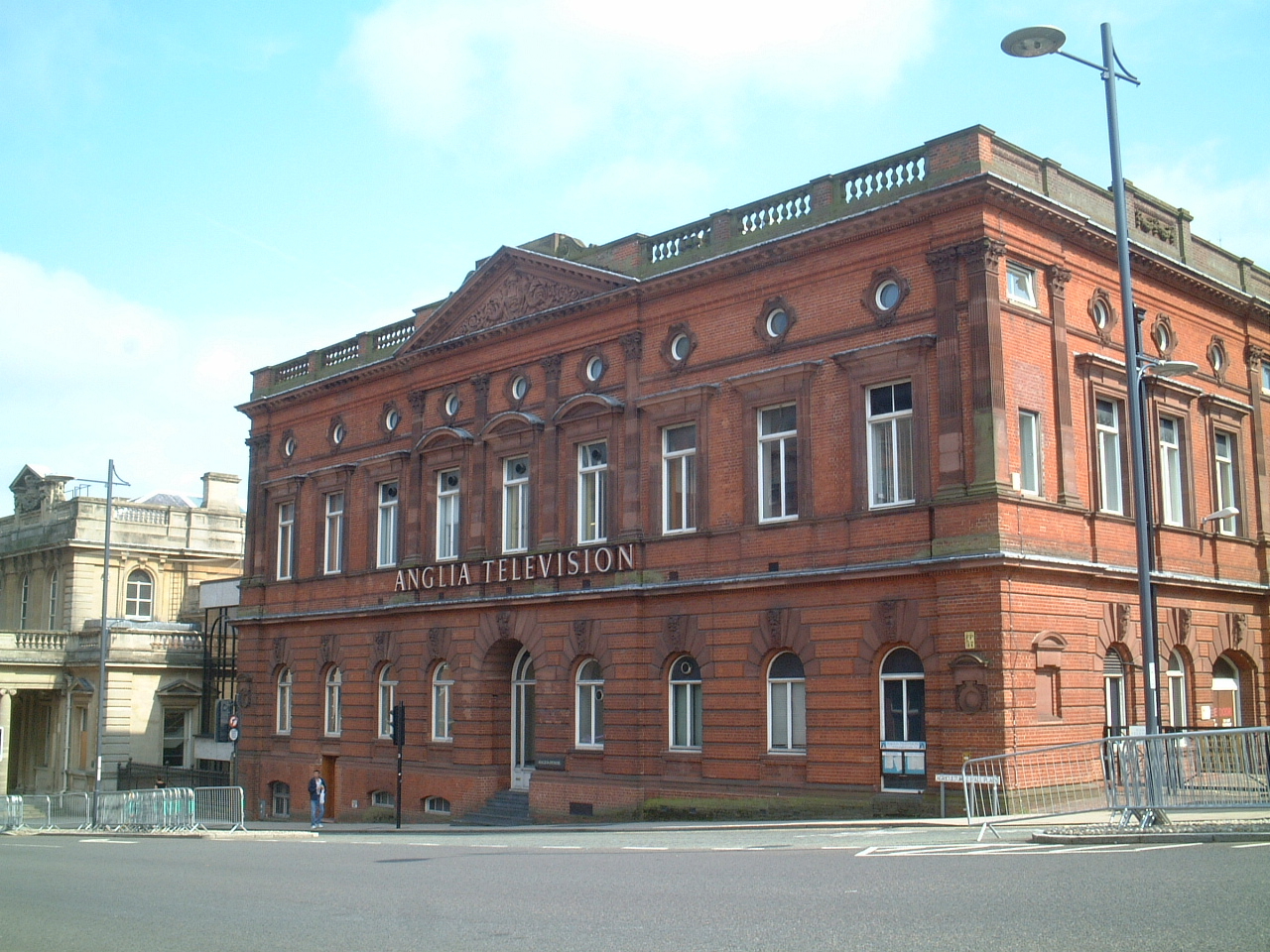
Anglia House, home of Anglia TV

== Personal life ==
In the 1988 New Year Honours, he was appointed a CBE. He married Lois Elder in 1968. He lives in Redenhall in South Norfolk, on the Suffolk boundary (River Waveney), off the A143.

Media offices
Preceded by	President of the Cinema and Television Benevolent Fund; 1998 - 2001	Succeeded by
Preceded by	Chairman of Anglia Television Ltd; 1994 - May 2001	Succeeded by
Preceded by	Chief Executive of Anglia Television Ltd; 1976 - 1994	Succeeded by
Preceded by	Chairman of Oxford Scientific Films; 1982 - 1989	Succeeded by
