= Dallas Animal Services =

Department of the government of the city of Dallas, Texas

Dallas Animal Services (DAS) is a department of the government of the city of Dallas, Texas. It operates the municipal animal shelter.

== History ==
Karen Brooks Harper of The Dallas Morning News stated that in years prior to 2016 the shelter had a "troubled history" in which an attack on a human by dogs, attributed to poor handling of dangerous dogs, formed the "apex". It was formerly a part of the city's department of code compliance.

In 2017 the organization of the shelter changed, when it became its own agency in the Dallas city government as a response to previous issues. Ed Jamison became the director at that time. MeLissa Webber replaced him in 2022 when Jamison became the head of an animal rescue. Paul Ramon became the head of the agency in 2026 after Webber left her position. Ramon retired in 2026. Harper stated that Ramon's period "is widely regarded as a major success during an intense transitional period for the shelter."

In 2026 the Dallas city government increased the shelter's budget by $1,500,000.
