= Collin County, Texas =

County in Texas, United States

- County
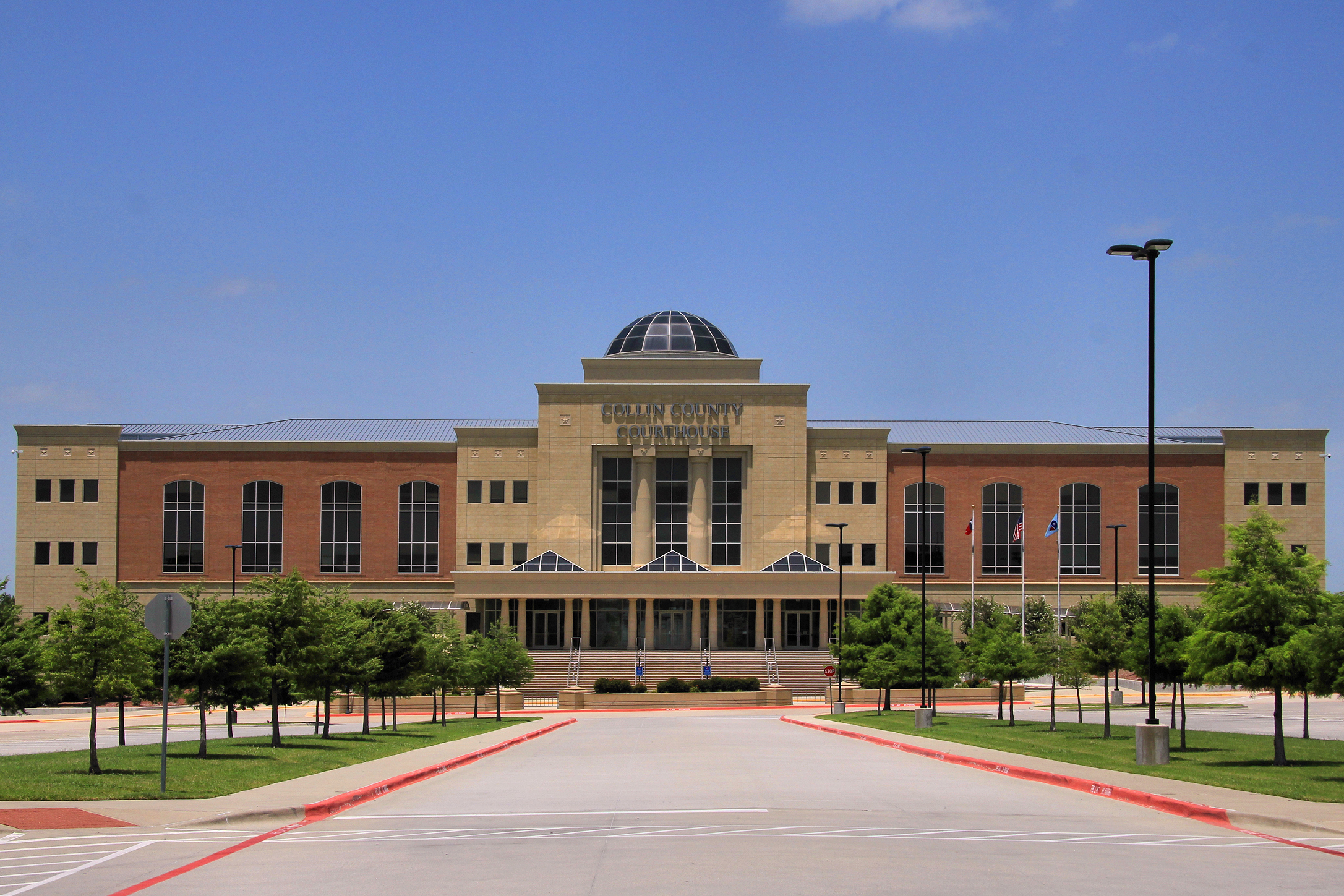
- The Collin County Courthouse in McKinney

- Flag Seal

- Location within the U.S. state of Texas
- Coordinates: 33°11′N 96°35′W
- Country: United States
- State: Texas
- Founded: 1846
- Named for: Collin McKinney
- Seat: McKinney
- Largest city: Plano

Government
  - County Judge: Chris Hill
  - County Administrator: Yoon Kim
  - County Comissioner Precinct 1: Susan Fletcher
  - County Comissioner Precinct 2: Cheryl Williams
  - County Comissioner Precinct 3: Darrell Hale
  - County Comissioner Precinct 4: Duncan Webb

Area
  - Total: 886 sq mi (2,290 km^{2})
  - Land: 841 sq mi (2,180 km^{2})
  - Water: 45 sq mi (120 km^{2}) 5.1%

Population (2020)
  - Total: 1,064,465
  - Estimate (2025): 1,297,179 ▲
  - Density: 1,270/sq mi (489/km^{2})
- Time zone: UTC−6 (Central)
  - Summer (DST): UTC−5 (CDT)
- Congressional districts: 3rd, 4th, 32nd
- Website: www.collincountytx.gov

Collin County is a county in the northern part of the U.S. state of Texas. It is part of the Dallas–Fort Worth–Arlington metropolitan statistical area, and a small portion of the city of Dallas is in the county. At the 2020 United States census, the county's population was 1,064,465, making it Texas's sixth-most populous county and the 43rd-largest county by population in the United States. Its county seat is McKinney.

== History ==
Native Americans around Collin County and North Texas included the Caddo, Comanche, Cherokee, Delaware, Kickapoo, and Tonkawa. Several Native American sites have been found, including around Lavon Lake and Sister Grove Creek. Both the county and the county seat were named after Collin McKinney (1766–1861), one of the five men who drafted the Texas Declaration of Independence and the oldest of the 59 men who signed it.

=== Civil War ===
Like many counties in North Texas, Collin County voted against secession from the United States. This is mainly due to the relatively weak hold of slavery in Collin County and the influence of James W. Throckmorton, who had represented Collin County in both the Texas Senate and the Texas House of Representatives. Nonetheless, Collin County sent men to fight for the Confederacy with Throckmorton leading his own company of mounted riflemen.

== Geography ==
According to the U.S. Census Bureau, the county has an area of 886 square miles (2,290 km^{2}), of which 45 sq mi (120 km^{2}) (5.1%) are covered by water.

=== Lakes ===
- Lavon Lake
- Lake Ray Hubbard (small part)

=== Adjacent counties ===
- Grayson County (north)
- Fannin County (northeast)
- Hunt County (east)
- Rockwall County (southeast)
- Dallas County (south)
- Denton County (west)

== Communities ==
=== Cities (shared with other counties) ===
- Carrollton (mostly in Dallas and Denton Counties)
- Celina (small part in Denton County)
- Dallas (mostly in Dallas County with small parts in Denton, Kaufman and Rockwall Counties)
- Frisco (partly in Denton County)
- Garland (mostly in Dallas County and a small part in Rockwall County)
- Josephine (small part in Hunt County)
- Plano (small part in Denton County)
- Richardson (mostly in Dallas County)
- Royse City (mostly in Rockwall County and partly Hunt County)
- Sachse (mostly in Dallas County)
- Van Alstyne (mostly in Grayson County)
- Wylie (small parts in Rockwall and Dallas Counties)

=== Towns (shared with other counties) ===
- Hebron (mostly in Denton County)
- Prosper (partly in Denton County)

=== Cities ===
- Allen
- Anna
- Blue Ridge
- Farmersville
- Lavon
- Lowry Crossing
- Lucas
- McKinney (county seat)
- Melissa
- Murphy
- Nevada
- Parker
- Princeton
- Weston

=== Towns ===
- Fairview
- New Hope
- St. Paul

=== Census-designated places ===
- Seis Lagos
- Westminster

=== Unincorporated communities ===
- Altoga
- Arnold
- Beverly Hill
- Bloomdale
- Branch
- Chambersville
- Chambliss
- Clear Lake
- Climax
- Collin
- Copeville
- Cowley
- Culleoka
- Desert
- Fayburg
- Forest Grove
- Frognot
- Kelly
- Little Ridge
- Milligan
- Millwood
- New Mesquite
- Pike
- Rhea Mills
- Rockhill
- Sedalia
- Snow Hill
- Trinity Park
- Valdasta
- Walnut Grove
- Winningkoff

=== Historical communities ===
- Buckner
- Lebanon
- Lolaville
- Renner
- Shepton
- Wetsel

=== Ghost towns ===
- Biggers
- Marilee
- Nickelville
- Parris
- Roland
- Verona

== Demographics ==
Historical population
| Census | Pop. | Note | %± |
|---|---|---|---|
| 1850 | 1,950 | | — |
| 1860 | 9,264 | | 375.1% |
| 1870 | 14,013 | | 51.3% |
| 1880 | 25,983 | | 85.4% |
| 1890 | 36,736 | | 41.4% |
| 1900 | 50,087 | | 36.3% |
| 1910 | 49,021 | | −2.1% |
| 1920 | 49,609 | | 1.2% |
| 1930 | 46,180 | | −6.9% |
| 1940 | 47,190 | | 2.2% |
| 1950 | 41,692 | | −11.7% |
| 1960 | 41,247 | | −1.1% |
| 1970 | 66,920 | | 62.2% |
| 1980 | 144,576 | | 116.0% |
| 1990 | 264,036 | | 82.6% |
| 2000 | 491,675 | | 86.2% |
| 2010 | 782,341 | | 59.1% |
| 2020 | 1,064,465 | | 36.1% |
| 2025 (est.) | 1,297,197 | ▲ | 21.9% |
U.S. Decennial Census; 1850–2010 2010–2019

=== 2020 census ===
As of the 2020 census, the county had a population of 1,064,465. The median age was 36.5 years. 26.1% of residents were under the age of 18 and 11.3% of residents were 65 years of age or older. For every 100 females there were 96.3 males, and for every 100 females age 18 and over there were 93.8 males age 18 and over.

The racial makeup of the county was 54.3% White, 10.4% Black or African American, 0.7% American Indian and Alaska Native, 17.8% Asian, 0.1% Native Hawaiian and Pacific Islander, 5.7% from some other race, and 11.1% from two or more races. Hispanic or Latino residents of any race comprised 15.9% of the population. The same dataset reports 50.96% non-Hispanic white, 10.16% Black or African American, 0.36% American Indian or Alaska Native, 17.70% Asian, 0.06% Pacific Islander, 0.46% some other race, 4.41% multiracial, and 15.89% Hispanic or Latino American of any race.

93.9% of residents lived in urban areas, while 6.1% lived in rural areas.

There were 381,318 households in the county, of which 39.7% had children under the age of 18 living in them. Of all households, 58.3% were married-couple households, 15.0% were households with a male householder and no spouse or partner present, and 22.2% were households with a female householder and no spouse or partner present. About 21.6% of all households were made up of individuals and 6.1% had someone living alone who was 65 years of age or older. There were 403,481 housing units, of which 5.5% were vacant. Among occupied housing units, 62.9% were owner-occupied and 37.1% were renter-occupied. The homeowner vacancy rate was 1.6% and the rental vacancy rate was 8.2%.

=== 2019 American Community Survey ===
The population density as of 2019 was 1,229.8 people per square mile (474.8 people/km^{2}). Among the population, the median age was 37.3, up from the statewide median age of 35.1.

Linguistically, 11.6% of the county spoke Spanish at home, followed by Asian and Pacific Islander languages. Altogether 29.7% of Collin County residents spoke a language other than English at home, contributed in part by its large foreign-born population which made up 22% of the population according to 2019 estimates from the American Community Survey.

In 2019, the American Community Survey estimated its non-Hispanic white population now represented 55%, reflecting a national demographic trend of diversification. The Black or African American population grew to 10%, Asian Americans made up 16% of the population, and Hispanic or Latino Americans increased to 16% of the total population in 2019; multiracial Americans made up an estimated 2% of the county population. The largest European ancestry groups from 2014 to 2019 were Germans, English Americans, and Irish and Italian Americans.

The median income for a household in the county as of 2019 was $96,134, up from $70,835 in 2000. Families had a median household income of $113,471, married-couple families $127,575, and non-family households $53,986. An estimated 6.3% of Collin County's residents lived at or below the poverty line from 2014 to 2019.

=== Housing and taxation ===
Of its residential properties, the median value of an owner-occupied housing unit was $354,100 in 2019, with a total of 8% of owner-occupied housing units ranging from less than $100,000 up to $200,000. In 2007, Collin County was ranked No. 21 for high property taxes in the U.S. as percentage of the homes' value on owner-occupied housing. It also ranked in the top 100 for amount of property taxes paid and for percentage of taxes of income. Part is this is due to the Robin Hood plan school financing system in Texas.

=== Racial and ethnic composition ===
Collin County, Texas – Racial and ethnic composition Note: the US Census treats Hispanic/Latino as an ethnic category. This table excludes Latinos from the racial categories and assigns them to a separate category. Hispanics/Latinos may be of any race.
| Race / ethnicity (NH = Non-Hispanic) | Pop 1980 | Pop 1990 | Pop 2000 | Pop 2010 | Pop 2020 | % 1980 | % 1990 | % 2000 | % 2010 | % 2020 |
|---|---|---|---|---|---|---|---|---|---|---|
| White alone (NH) | 129,441 | 226,654 | 374,116 | 493,492 | 542,472 | 89.53% | 85.84% | 76.09% | 63.08% | 50.96% |
| Black or African American alone (NH) | 6,190 | 10,727 | 23,212 | 64,715 | 108,100 | 4.28% | 4.06% | 4.72% | 8.27% | 10.16% |
| Native American or Alaska Native alone (NH) | 452 | 997 | 1,937 | 3,278 | 3,874 | 0.31% | 0.38% | 0.39% | 0.42% | 0.36% |
| Asian alone (NH) | 1,032 | 7,317 | 33,902 | 87,276 | 188,365 | 0.71% | 2.77% | 6.90% | 11.16% | 17.70% |
| Native Hawaiian or Pacific Islander alone (NH) | x | x | 194 | 387 | 613 | x | x | 0.04% | 0.05% | 0.06% |
| Other race alone (NH) | 275 | 183 | 630 | 1,364 | 4,910 | 0.19% | 0.07% | 0.13% | 0.17% | 0.46% |
| Mixed race or Multiracial (NH) | x | x | 7,174 | 16,475 | 46,973 | x | x | 1.46% | 2.11% | 4.41% |
| Hispanic or Latino (any race) | 7,186 | 18,158 | 50,510 | 115,354 | 169,158 | 4.97% | 6.88% | 10.27% | 14.74% | 15.89% |
| Total | 144,576 | 264,036 | 491,675 | 782,341 | 1,064,465 | 100.00% | 100.00% | 100.00% | 100.00% | 100.00% |

=== 2000 census ===
In 2000, the U.S. Census Bureau determined 491,675 people resided in Collin County. At the 2000 census, the racial and ethnic makeup of the county was 81.39% White, 4.79% Black or African American, 0.47% Native American, 6.92% Asian, 0.05% Pacific Islander, 4.26% from other races, and 2.11% from two or more races; 10.27% of the population were Hispanic or Latino American of any race. In 2000, about 3.30% of families and 4.90% of the population lived at or below the poverty line, including 5.10% of those under age 18 and 7.10% of those aged 65 and older.

=== Religion ===
Christianity has historically been the predominant religious affiliation among the county's residents as part of the Bible Belt. According to the 2020 Public Religion Research Institute study, non-Christian religions are present and have been growing, largely due to migration into the county; 3% of the county’s pi was Hindu, 2% Muslim and 2% Jewish. Overall among its Christian population, Catholics are the largest group holding a plurality of Christians in Collin County. Baptists, Methodists, Evangelicals, and non-denominational Christians are also prominent.

=== American Community Survey 2025 data ===
The United States Census Bureau estimated that in 2025, Collin County’s population was 1,297,179. It was also estimated that the county's population was 45.12% Non-Hispanic White, 16.57% Hispanic or Latino, 11.41% Non-Hispanic Black, 22.64% Asian, 0.34% Native American, 0.08% Pacific Islander, and 3.84% Multiracial.

| Total | Population | Percentage |
|---|---|---|
| Non-Hispanic White | 585,321 | 45.12% |
| Hispanic or Latino | 214,914 | 16.57% |
| Non-Hispanic Black | 148,066 | 11.41% |
| Asian | 293,681 | 22.64% |
| Native American | 4,435 | 0.34% |
| Pacific Islander | 982 | 0.08% |
| Non-Hispanic Multiracial | 49,780 | 3.84% |

== Government, courts, and politics ==
=== Government ===
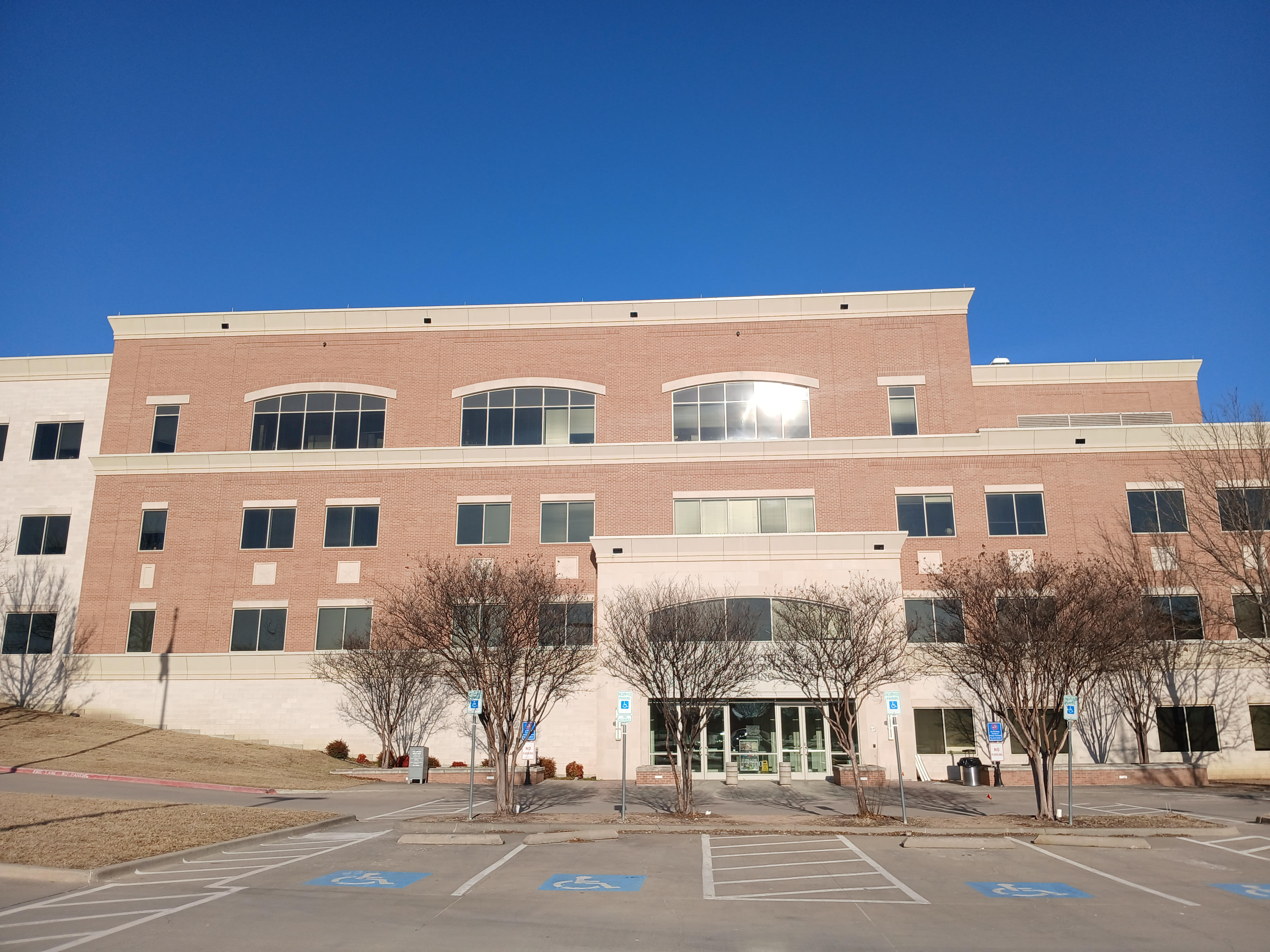
Collin County Administration Building

Collin County, like all counties in Texas, is governed by a Commissioners Court. The court is chaired by a county judge (equivalent to a county executive in other states) who is elected county-wide, and four commissioners who are elected by the voters in each of four precincts.

==== County Judge & Commissioners ====
| Office | Name | Party |
|---|---|---|
| County Judge | Chris Hill | Republican |
| Commissioner, Precinct 1 | Susan Fletcher | Republican |
| Commissioner, Precinct 2 | Cheryl Williams | Republican |
| Commissioner, Precinct 3 | Darrell Hale | Republican |
| Commissioner, Precinct 4 | Duncan Webb | Republican |

==== County Officials ====
| Office | Name | Party |
|---|---|---|
| County Clerk | Stacey Kemp | Republican |
| Criminal District Attorney | Greg Willis | Republican |
| District Clerk | Mike Gould | Republican |
| Sheriff | Jim Skinner | Republican |
| Tax Assessor-Collector | Scott Grigg | Republican |

==== Justices of the Peace ====
| Office | Name | Party |
|---|---|---|
| Precinct 1 | Paul Raleeh | Republican |
| Precinct 2 | Ellen Kinnebrew | Republican |
| Precinct 3 | Mike Missildine | Republican |
| Precinct 4 | Vincent J. Venegoni | Republican |

=== Politics ===
Like most suburban Texas counties, Collin County has consistently supported Republican candidates in presidential and congressional elections since the 1960s. The last Democratic presidential candidate to win the county was native Texan Lyndon Johnson in 1964, and prior to 2026, it had previously not supported any Democrat in a federal race since Lloyd Bentsen won the county in 1970. The county gave over 80% of the vote to Ronald Reagan in 1984.

The county's Republican lean has decreased over the decades. Democrat Barack Obama won over 30% of the vote in both of his elections. By the 2020s, Collin County had become considered competitive in national elections due to demographic and voting trends, though it remains Republican-leaning. In down-ballot races, Republicans hold all of the county-level offices and all but one of the county's seats in the state legislature.

Despite its Republican lean, Collin County has trended leftward, as Joe Biden managed to win 46.9% of the vote share (compared to Donald Trump's 51.3%) in the 2020 presidential election, the best result for a Democrat since 1964. Many other suburban Texas counties, including neighboring Denton and Tarrant Counties, as well as those around Houston and Austin, showed similar swings between 2016 and 2020. However, in 2024 many of these swung back toward Trump, though Trump carried Collin County by a somewhat smaller margin than in 2016. Democrat Kamala Harris still managed to receive over 40% of the vote in 2024, with the county voting to the left of the state.

United States presidential election results for Collin County, Texas
| Year | Republican | | Democratic | | Third party(ies) | |
| Year | No. | % | No. | % | No. | % |
|---|---|---|---|---|---|---|
| 1912 | 342 | 9.08% | 3,187 | 84.58% | 239 | 6.34% |
| 1916 | 594 | 12.04% | 4,141 | 83.94% | 198 | 4.01% |
| 1920 | 1,338 | 23.16% | 4,045 | 70.01% | 395 | 6.84% |
| 1924 | 1,981 | 21.15% | 7,215 | 77.04% | 169 | 1.80% |
| 1928 | 3,476 | 50.55% | 3,377 | 49.11% | 23 | 0.33% |
| 1932 | 589 | 8.79% | 6,059 | 90.46% | 50 | 0.75% |
| 1936 | 531 | 8.55% | 5,669 | 91.29% | 10 | 0.16% |
| 1940 | 1,028 | 12.22% | 7,373 | 87.65% | 11 | 0.13% |
| 1944 | 974 | 11.67% | 6,574 | 78.79% | 796 | 9.54% |
| 1948 | 1,155 | 15.93% | 5,516 | 76.08% | 579 | 7.99% |
| 1952 | 4,037 | 40.57% | 5,906 | 59.36% | 7 | 0.07% |
| 1956 | 3,823 | 41.84% | 5,280 | 57.79% | 34 | 0.37% |
| 1960 | 3,865 | 42.20% | 5,229 | 57.10% | 64 | 0.70% |
| 1964 | 3,341 | 29.85% | 7,833 | 69.98% | 19 | 0.17% |
| 1968 | 6,494 | 39.93% | 5,918 | 36.39% | 3,850 | 23.67% |
| 1972 | 17,667 | 78.04% | 4,783 | 21.13% | 187 | 0.83% |
| 1976 | 21,608 | 60.02% | 14,039 | 39.00% | 353 | 0.98% |
| 1980 | 36,559 | 67.88% | 15,187 | 28.20% | 2,115 | 3.93% |
| 1984 | 61,095 | 81.64% | 13,604 | 18.18% | 139 | 0.19% |
| 1988 | 67,776 | 74.29% | 22,934 | 25.14% | 520 | 0.57% |
| 1992 | 60,514 | 46.97% | 24,508 | 19.02% | 43,811 | 34.01% |
| 1996 | 83,750 | 63.01% | 37,854 | 28.48% | 11,321 | 8.52% |
| 2000 | 128,179 | 73.07% | 42,884 | 24.45% | 4,357 | 2.48% |
| 2004 | 174,435 | 71.15% | 68,935 | 28.12% | 1,784 | 0.73% |
| 2008 | 184,897 | 62.16% | 109,047 | 36.66% | 3,513 | 1.18% |
| 2012 | 196,888 | 64.86% | 101,415 | 33.41% | 5,264 | 1.73% |
| 2016 | 201,014 | 55.16% | 140,624 | 38.59% | 22,792 | 6.25% |
| 2020 | 252,318 | 51.26% | 230,945 | 46.92% | 8,953 | 1.82% |
| 2024 | 279,534 | 54.22% | 222,115 | 43.08% | 13,936 | 2.70% |

United States Senate election results for Collin County, Texas1
| Year | Republican | | Democratic | | Third party(ies) | |
| Year | No. | % | No. | % | No. | % |
|---|---|---|---|---|---|---|
| 2000 | 138,227 | 79.86% | 30,648 | 17.71% | 4,219 | 2.44% |
| 2006 | 97,055 | 70.91% | 36,670 | 26.79% | 3,149 | 2.30% |
| 2012 | 189,142 | 64.20% | 96,726 | 32.83% | 8,759 | 2.97% |
| 2018 | 187,425 | 52.65% | 165,614 | 46.53% | 2,927 | 0.82% |
| 2024 | 263,381 | 51.48% | 236,579 | 46.24% | 11,651 | 2.28% |

United States Senate election results for Collin County, Texas2
| Year | Republican | | Democratic | | Third party(ies) | |
| Year | No. | % | No. | % | No. | % |
|---|---|---|---|---|---|---|
| 2002 | 88,136 | 64.68% | 36,750 | 26.97% | 11,383 | 8.35% |
| 2008 | 184,000 | 64.09% | 96,094 | 33.47% | 6,996 | 2.44% |
| 2014 | 119,450 | 68.36% | 48,876 | 27.97% | 6,415 | 3.67% |
| 2020 | 263,074 | 55.90% | 207,005 | 43.99% | 530 | 0.11% |
| 2026 | 197,096 | 43.07% | 252,403 | 55.15% | 8,142 | 1.78% |

Texas Gubernatorial election results for Collin County
| Year | Republican | | Democratic | | Third party(ies) | |
| Year | No. | % | No. | % | No. | % |
|---|---|---|---|---|---|---|
| 2002 | 95,496 | 74.12% | 30,850 | 23.94% | 2,492 | 1.93% |
| 2006 | 67,813 | 49.08% | 32,457 | 23.49% | 37,889 | 27.42% |
| 2010 | 100,359 | 63.98% | 51,890 | 33.08% | 4,600 | 2.93% |
| 2014 | 115,647 | 65.65% | 57,431 | 32.60% | 3,072 | 1.74% |
| 2018 | 208,075 | 59.92% | 139,175 | 40.08% | 6.444 | 0.00% |
| 2022 | 198,236 | 54.31% | 161,737 | 44.31% | 5,003 | 1.37% |
| 2026 | 215,566 | 46.89% | 236,034 | 51.34% | 8,115 | 1.77% |

== Education ==
=== K–12 education ===
The following school districts lie entirely within Collin County:

- Allen Independent School District
- Anna Independent School District
- Farmersville Independent School District
- Lovejoy Independent School District
- McKinney Independent School District
- Melissa Independent School District
- Plano Independent School District
- Princeton Independent School District
- Wylie Independent School District

The following districts lie partly within the county:

- Bland Independent School District (very small part only)
- Blue Ridge Independent School District
- Celina Independent School District
- Community Independent School District
- Frisco Independent School District
- Gunter Independent School District (very small part)
- Leonard Independent School District (very small part only)
- Prosper Independent School District
- Rockwall Independent School District
- Royse City Independent School District
- Trenton Independent School District (very small part only)
- Van Alstyne Independent School District (very small part only)
- Whitewright Independent School District (very small part only)

In the 1990s Plano ISD received many non-Hispanic white families leaving urban areas. From circa 1997 and 2015 the number of non-Hispanic white children in K–12 schools in the county increased by 40,000 as part of a trend of white flight and suburbanization by non-Hispanic white families; however the same number of Plano ISD in particular decreased by 10,000 in that period.

=== Colleges and universities ===
Collin College opened its first campus on Highway 380 in McKinney in 1985. The college has grown to seven campuses/locations—two in McKinney and two in Plano and as well as Frisco, Allen, Rockwall, Wylie, Farmersville, and Celina. Collin College's official service area includes all of Collin County.

Dallas Baptist University also has an extension site in Frisco, DBU Frisco, as well as the University of North Texas's extension side, UNT Frisco.

The majority of the University of Texas at Dallas campus in Richardson, Texas lies within Collin County. While the main campus' address is officially within the jurisdiction of Richardson and Collin county, approximately one-third of the college is physically located within the border of Dallas county.

== Transportation ==
With the Red Line operated by Dallas Area Rapid Transit (DART) ending with its northern terminus at Parker Road Station in Plano, most of Collin County is not served by any public transit agencies as of 2023. The Texoma Area Paratransit System (TAPS) transit service provided bus routes for a short period from 2013 until Collin County bus service was suspended in 2015. The North Central Texas Council of Governments (NCTCOG) in a 2022 meeting discussed the possibility of expansion of the Red Line corridor from Plano through Allen to McKinney. Either the Red Line or Silver Line could be extended north. While the Red Line could be expanded further north into Allen, Allen is currently unable to levy the 1% sales tax required to become a DART member city.

=== Major highways ===
- U.S. Highway 75
- U.S. Highway 380
- Dallas North Tollway
- State Highway 190 / President George Bush Turnpike
- State Highway 5
- State Highway 66
- State Highway 78
- State Highway 121 / Sam Rayburn Tollway
- State Highway 160
- State Highway 205
- State Highway 289
- Spur 195
- Spur 399

=== Air ===
McKinney National Airport is a public general aviation (GA) airport located in southeast McKinney that handles between 300 and 700 flights a day. The city purchased the airport in 1979, and in 2023, it completed a major expansion of the GA terminal. In January 2025, city officials approved a $72 million project to build a commercial airline terminal on the east side of the airport.

Aero Country Airport, located on the west edge of McKinney, is a privately owned public-use GA airport used primarily by single-engine aircraft, with about 30 flights per day.

=== Rail ===
Carrollton, Frisco, Prosper, and Celina are served by a BNSF Railway line connecting Irving to Denison. McKinney is the southern terminus of a branch line of the Dallas, Garland and Northeastern Railroad that originates in Sherman. As of February 2025, these rail lines are used for freight haulage only; no scheduled passenger service is offered.

== Parks ==
- Bratonia Park
- Myers Park
- Parkhill Prairie
- Sister Grove Park
- Trinity Trail
- Heard Natural Science Museum and Wildlife Sanctuary

== Infrastructure ==
Collin County Animal Services, which operates its shelter in McKinney, covers animal control and shelter services for unincorporated areas and for Anna, Celina, Fairview, Farmersville, Lucas, Melissa, Nevada, Princeton, Prosper, and Weston. While Frisco and McKinney operate their own animal control services, they contract with Collin County Animal Services to shelter animals. The following cities have their own animal control and animal shelter services: Allen, Dallas (Dallas Animal Services), Plano, Richardson, and Wylie.

== Media ==
Collin County is part of the Dallas–Fort Worth metroplex media market. Local media outlets are KDFW-TV, KXAS-TV, WFAA-TV, KTVT-TV, KERA-TV, KTXA-TV, KDFI-TV, KDAF-TV, and KFWD-TV. Other nearby stations that provide coverage for Collin County come from the Texoma market, including KTEN-TV and KXII-TV.

Newspapers in the Collin County area include the Allen American, Celina Record, Farmersville Times, Frisco Enterprise, McKinney Courier-Gazette, and the Plano Star-Courier. Nearby publications The Dallas Morning News and the Fort Worth Star-Telegram also provide news coverage of cities in the county.

== Notable people ==
- Collin McKinney (1766–1861) – politician, businessman, and co-author of the Texas Declaration of Independence
- Griff Barnett (1884–1958) – actor born in Blue Ridge
- Josh Blaylock (born 1990) – actor and photographer born in Plano
- Samuel Bogart (1797–1861) – American Methodist minister and militia officer
- Casey Dick (born 1986) – football player born in Lucas
- Russell E. Dickenson (1923–2008) – park ranger born in Melissa
- Julie Doyle (born 1996) – soccer player for Sky Blue FC (NWSL) born in Fairview
- Devin Duvernay (born 1997) – football player for Baltimore Ravens born in Sachse
- Jordan Roos (born 1993) – football player free agent
- King Fisher (1853–1884) – Texas rancher and gunfighter born in Collin County
- James R. Gough (1860–1916) – Texas State Senator born in Collin County
- Frank Shelby Groner (1877–1943) – lawyer, pastor, and educator born near Weston
- Aubrey Otis Hampton (1900–1955) – radiologist born in Copeville
- Warren Glenn Harding Sr. (1921–2005) – Texas state treasurer born in Princeton
- Jimmie C. Holland (1928–2017) – founder of the field of psycho-oncology, born in Nevada
- Sam Johnson (1930–2020) – politician who represented Collin County and Texas's 3rd District in US House of Representatives
- Kyler Murray (born 1997) – football player for Arizona Cardinals from Allen
- Bumper Pool (born 1999) – football player born in Lucas
- Jason Ralph (born 1986) – actor born in McKinney
- James W. Throckmorton (1825–1894) – 12th governor of Texas, lived and is buried in McKinney

== See also ==
- List of museums in North Texas
- National Register of Historic Places listings in Collin County, Texas
- Recorded Texas Historic Landmarks in Collin County
