= Allen American =

Newspaper

- Type: Weekly newspaper
- Publisher: Star Local Media
- Founded: 1970
- Headquarters: Allen Texas, United States
- Website: starlocalmedia.com/allenamerican

The Allen American is a weekly local newspaper in Allen, Texas founded in 1970. It is currently operated by Star Media. In 1972 it swept the East Texas Press Association Awards, being judged the best publication in local news writing, general excellence, pictures, and community service. In the 1990s it was edited by Mark Hutchison and owned by Harte-Hanks Newspapers. It was later acquired by Scripps then sold to Lionheart in 1998.
