= Lavon Lake =

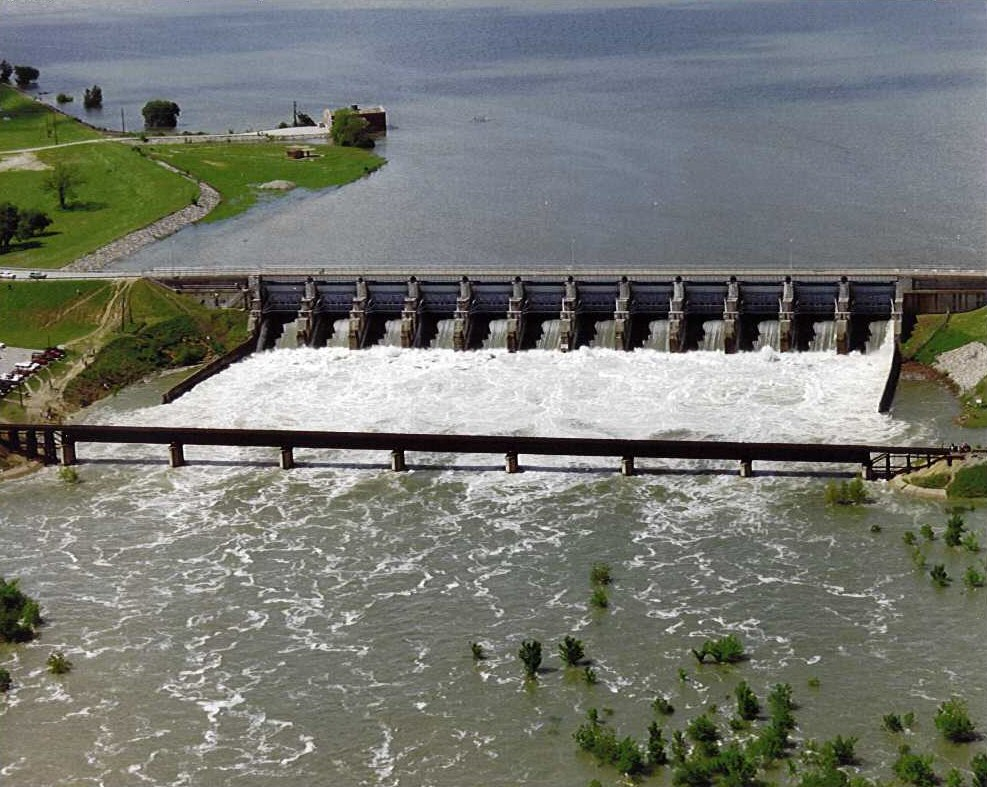
- Aerial view of Lavon Lake and Dam

- Location within Texas Location within the United States
- Location: Collin County, Texas
- Coordinates: 33°02′40″N 96°27′56″W
- Lake type: Reservoir
- Primary inflows: East Fork of the Trinity River
- Basin countries: United States
- Managing agency: United States Army Corps of Engineers
- Surface area: 21,400 acres (87 km^{2})
- Max. depth: 38 ft (12 m)
- Water volume: 409,360 acre⋅ft (504,940,000 m^{3})
- Shore length^{1}: 83 mi (134 km)
- Surface elevation: 492 ft (150 m)
- ^{1} Shore length is not a well-defined measure.

Lavon Lake is a freshwater reservoir located in southeast Collin County, Texas, on the East Fork of the Trinity River near Wylie, off State Highway 78. It is commonly called Lake Lavon for commercial and recreational purposes, but Lavon Lake is its official name according to the U.S. Army Corps of Engineers. It was originally called Lavon Reservoir.

== Statistics ==
- Length: 9,540 feet (2,908 m)
- Maximum depth: 38 ft
- Surface area: 21,400 acres (87 km^{2})
- Conversion storage capacity: 275,000 acre-feet (339,000,000 m^{3})
- Conservation pool elevation: 492 feet (150.0 m) msl
- Spillway level: 503.5 feet (153.5 m)
- Shoreline length: 121 miles (195 km)
- Wildlife management area: 6,500 acres
- Date impounded: September 14, 1953
- Owned by: United States government (North Texas Municipal Water District, the local cooperative agency, has rights to 100,000 acre-feet (120,000,000 m^{3}) of water in the conservation pool of the lake)
- Operated by: U.S. Army Corps of Engineers

In addition to flood control and recreation, the lake serves as a water source for hundreds of thousands of North Texas residents. Lavon Lake is a part of the North Texas Municipal Water District system.

== History ==
Started in 1948 and completed in 1953, the Lavon Dam was created to impound the upstream East Fork of the Trinity River, some of its tributaries, and the areas immediately surrounding them. The reservoir was primarily designed for preventing seasonal flooding of rich bottomland in northeastern Collin County, and water storage. Its construction also stimulated land development along the shores of the lake and recreational use of the water and adjacent land areas. In 1962, Congressional approval was given to modify the project to increase storage for water supply because of the growing water supply need of the area. Also part of the modification was to add recreation as a purpose for the lake. This focused management and development for public use, recreational activities, and stewardship of the water and land areas.

== Fishing ==
Lavon Lake's most prevalent fish species are the largemouth bass, white bass, blue catfish, and crappie.

== See also ==
- Trinity River Authority
