= Blue Ridge Independent School District =

School district in Texas, United States

Coordinates: 33°18′19″N 96°24′15″W

Location
- Blue Ridge, Texas ESC Region 10 US

District information
- Type: Public
- Grades: Pre-K through 12
- Superintendent: Dr. Darrell Floyd
- Schools: 3
- NCES District ID: 4810590

Students and staff
- Students: 758 (2016-17)
- Teachers: 54.1 (2016-17) (on full-time equivalent (FTE) basis)
- Student–teacher ratio: 14.0 (2016-17)
- Athletic conference: UIL Class 3A
- District mascot: Tigers
- Colors: Green and white

Other information
- TEA District Accountability Rating for 2016-17: Met Standard
- Website: www.brisd.net

Blue Ridge Independent School District is a public school district based in Blue Ridge, Texas (United States). Located in Collin County, it includes Blue Ridge and sections of Anna. The district extends into a very small portion of southwestern Fannin County.

== Finances ==
As of the 2010–2011 school year, the appraised valuation of property in the district was $122,029,000. The maintenance tax rate was $0.117 and the bond tax rate was $0.050 per $100 of appraised valuation.

== Academic achievement ==
In 2017, the school district was rated Met Standard by the Texas Education Agency. No state accountability ratings were given to districts in 2012.

Historical district TEA accountability ratings

- 2017: Met Standard
- 2016: Met Standard
- 2015: Met Standard
- 2014: Met Standard
- 2013: Met Standard
- 2012: N/A
- 2011: Recognized
- 2010: Recognized
- 2009: Recognized
- 2008: Academically Acceptable
- 2007: Academically Acceptable
- 2006: Academically Acceptable
- 2005: Academically Acceptable
- 2004: Academically Acceptable

== Schools ==
In the 2016–2017 school year, the district had students in three schools.
Regular instructional

- Blue Ridge High (Grades 9–12)
- Blue Ridge Middle (Grades 6–8)
- Blue Ridge Elementary (Grades PK-5)

Closed campuses

- N/A

== Special programs ==
=== Athletics ===
Blue Ridge High School participates in the following UIL Class 3A sports:

- Football
- Volleyball
- Basketball
- Baseball
- Softball
- Track & Field
- Cross Country
- Tennis
- Golf
- Powerlifting

== See also ==
- List of school districts in Texas
- List of high schools in Texas
