= Blue Ridge, Texas =

- City
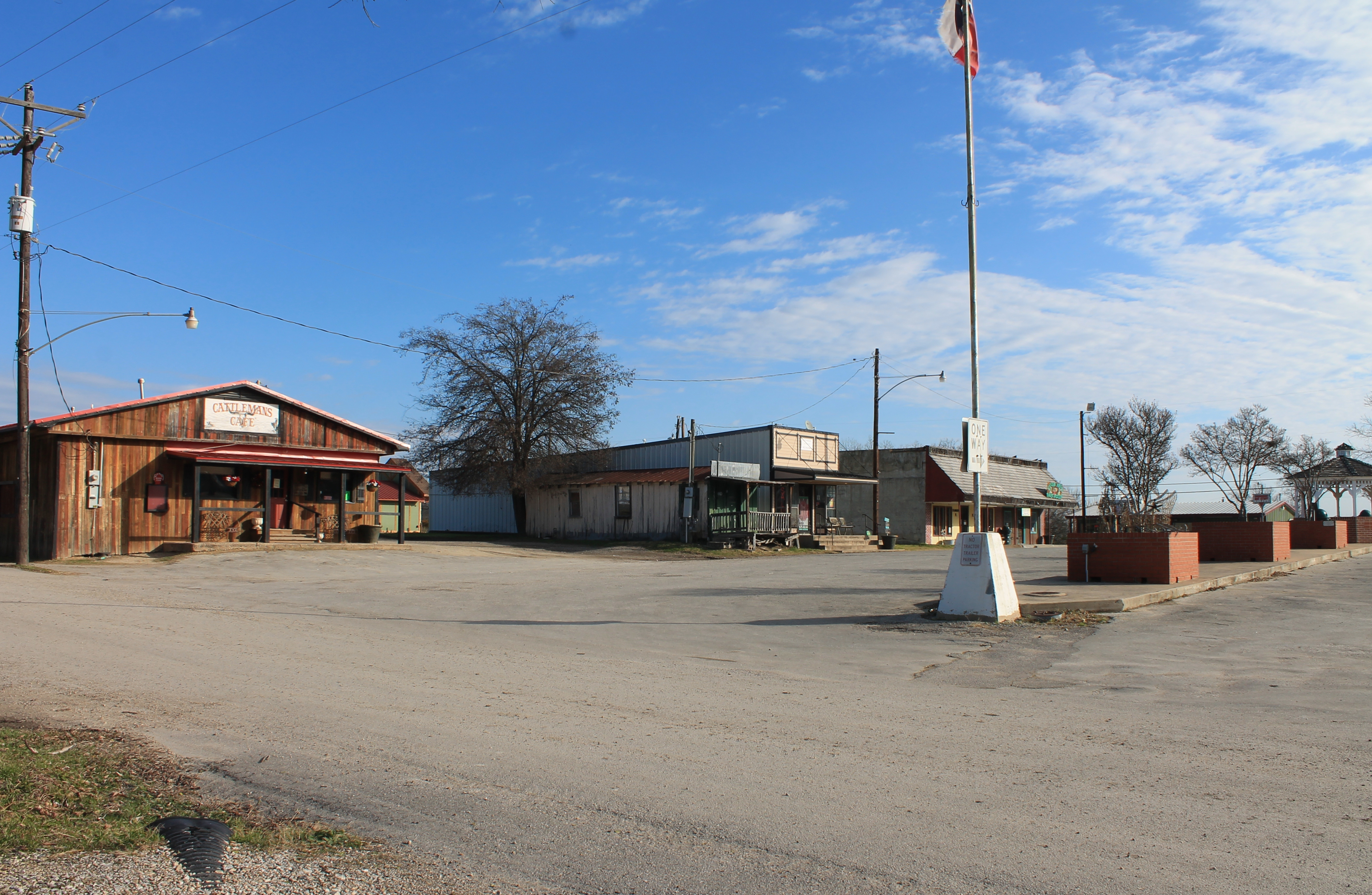
- Blue Ridge City Square in December 2013 (camera facing northeast)
- Interactive map of Blue Ridge, Texas
- Coordinates: 33°17′27″N 96°22′26″W
- Country: United States
- State: Texas
- County: Collin

Area
  - Total: 1.12 sq mi (2.89 km^{2})
  - Land: 1.12 sq mi (2.89 km^{2})
  - Water: 0 sq mi (0.00 km^{2})
- Elevation: 574 ft (175 m)

Population (2020)
  - Total: 1,180
  - Density: 830.6/sq mi (320.71/km^{2})
- Time zone: UTC−6 (Central (CST))
  - Summer (DST): UTC−5 (CDT)
- ZIP Code: 75424
- Area codes: 214, 469, 945, 972
- FIPS code: 48-08872
- GNIS feature ID: 2409870
- Website: blueridgecity.com

Blue Ridge is a city at the intersection of state highway 78, FM 981, and FM 545 in Collin County, Texas, United States. The population was 822 at the 2010 census, and 1,180 in 2020.

== History ==
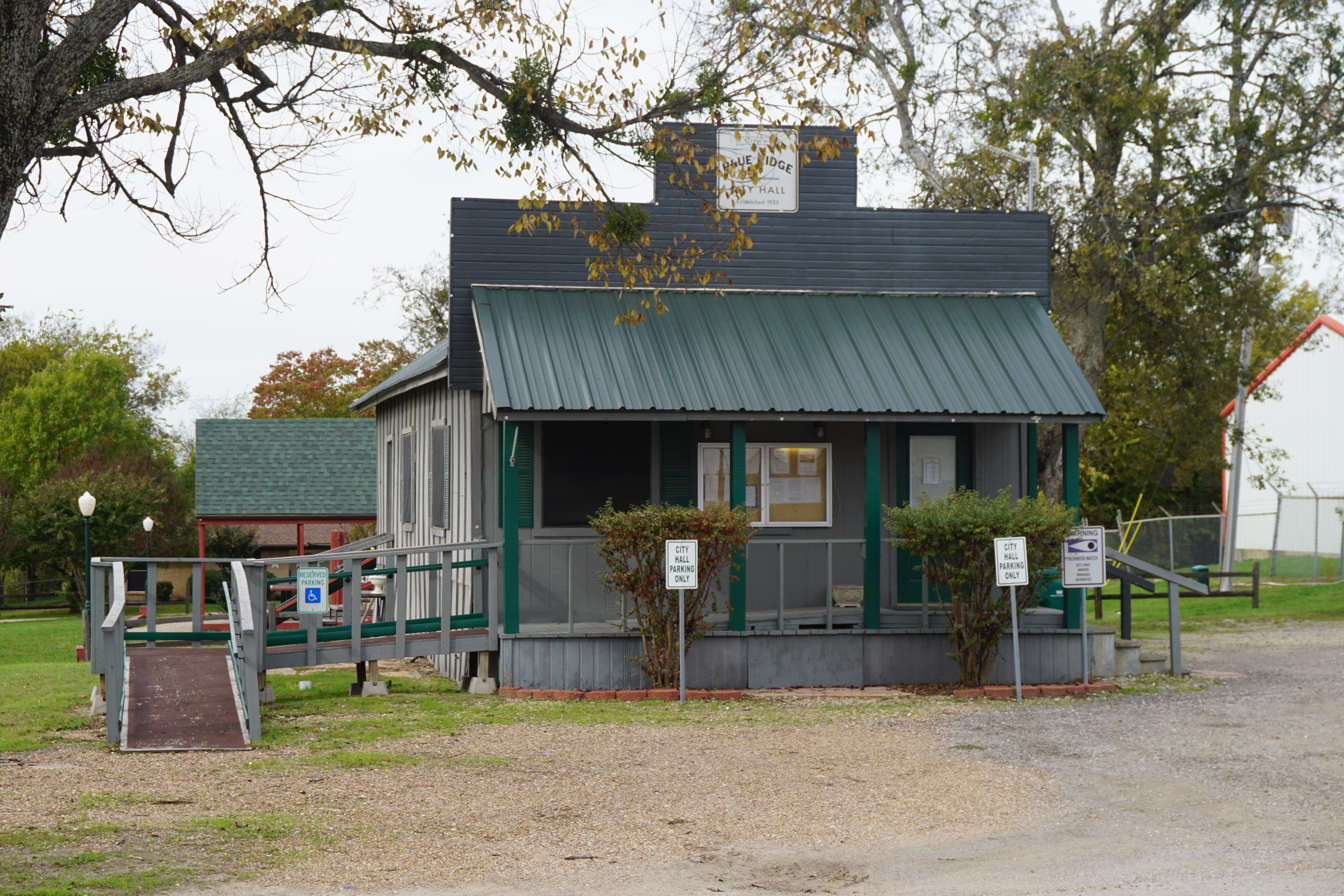
The former Blue Ridge City Hall building in November 2015, currently occupied by the Blue Ridge Resource Center.

Blue Ridge is named for the blue flowers found on the hills around the area by early settlers.

=== 1919 Tornado ===
During the Tornado outbreak of April 9, 1919, a violent nocturnal F4 tornado struck Blue Ridge before tracking northeastward across Collin and Fannin counties. The tornado touched down southwest of Blue Ridge at approximately 11:45 PM and cut a continuous 30-mile (48 km) path, devastating the rural communities of Blue Ridge, Delba, Trenton and Ector before terminating near Ravenna.

The storm obliterated numerous small farmhouses in the Blue Ridge area, resulting in seven fatalities within the local vicinity, including six members of an eight-person family whose home was entirely destroyed. In total, the single long-track tornado caused 18 deaths, 60 injuries, and over $200,000 in property damage across its entire path.

=== 2017 oil pipeline spill ===
On January 30, 2017, 600,000 gallons of oil spilled from the Seaway Pipeline in Blue Ridge.

== Geography ==
According to the United States Census Bureau, the city has a total area of 1.12 square miles (2.9 km^{2}), all land.

== Demographics ==
Historical population
Census	Pop.	Note	%±
1940	424		—
1950	306		−27.8%
1960	330		7.8%
1970	384		16.4%
1980	442		15.1%
1990	521		17.9%
2000	672		29.0%
2010	822		22.3%
2020	1,180		43.6%
U.S. Decennial Census

=== 2020 census ===
As of the 2020 census, Blue Ridge had a population of 1,180. The median age was 31.3 years. 32.5% of residents were under the age of 18 and 8.6% of residents were 65 years of age or older. For every 100 females there were 96.0 males, and for every 100 females age 18 and over there were 92.5 males age 18 and over.

0% of residents lived in urban areas, while 100.0% lived in rural areas.

There were 372 households in Blue Ridge, of which 53.0% had children under the age of 18 living in them. Of all households, 57.8% were married-couple households, 13.4% were households with a male householder and no spouse or partner present, and 20.4% were households with a female householder and no spouse or partner present. About 15.0% of all households were made up of individuals and 4.6% had someone living alone who was 65 years of age or older.

There were 394 housing units, of which 5.6% were vacant. Among occupied housing units, 68.3% were owner-occupied and 31.7% were renter-occupied. The homeowner vacancy rate was 2.3% and the rental vacancy rate was 10.6%.

Racial composition as of the 2020 census
Race	Percent
White	66.4%
Black or African American	0.8%
American Indian and Alaska Native	1.8%
Asian	0.8%
Native Hawaiian and Other Pacific Islander	0%
Some other race	14.3%
Two or more races	15.8%
Hispanic or Latino (of any race)	31.8%

=== 2010 census ===
At the 2010 census there were 822 people in 284 households, including 210 families, in the city. The population density was 733.9 inhabitants per square mile (283.4/km^{2}). There were 323 housing units at an average density of 288.4 per square mile (111.4/km^{2}). The racial makeup of the city was 92.60% White, 0.4% African American, 0.7% Native American, 2.8% from other races, and 3.4% from two or more races. Hispanic or Latino of any race were 13.1%.

Of the 284 households 39.8% had children under the age of 18 living with them, 54.2% were married couples living together, 15.5% had a female householder with no husband present, and 26.1% were non-families. 22.2% of households were one person and 21.5% were one person aged 65 or older. The average household size was 2.89 and the average family size was 3.38.

The age distribution was 29.4% under the age of 18, 10.7% from 18 to 24, 29.2% from 25 to 44, 21.8% from 45 to 64, and 8.9% 65 or older. The median age was 32.0 years. For every 100 females, there were 87.7 males. For every 100 females age 18 and over, there were 82.4 males.

The median household income was $44,625 and the median family income was $67,250. Males had a median income of $31,250 versus $43,125 for females. The per capita income for the city was $19,522. About 9.8% of families and 15.2% of the population were below the poverty line, including 25.0% of those under age 18 and 46.8% of those age 65 or over; however, the margin of error for these metrics was ±10.2% for families in poverty, and ±26.7% and ±27.8% for under 18 and over 65 in poverty, respectively.

== Education ==
The city of Blue Ridge is served by Blue Ridge Independent School District.

== Parks and recreation ==
Bratcher Park is located on the west side of the town square behind the Blue Ridge Resource Center and the former city hall.

Blue Ridge is also the home of Parkhill Prairie, a 436-acre Blackland tall-grass prairie preserve located off of Collin County road 668.

== Notable people ==
- Griff Barnett (1884–1958), actor who appeared in numerous films including Pinky (1949) and The Spirit of St. Louis (1957); born in Blue Ridge.
