= Texas State Highway 356 =

State highway in Texas

State Highway 356
- Irving Boulevard
- SH 356, highlighted in red

Route information
- Maintained by TxDOT
- Length: 6.386 mi (10.277 km)
- Existed: 1946–present

SH 356 west
- West end: SH 183 in Irving
- East end: Sowers Road in Irving

SH 356 east
- West end: Lee Street in Irving
- East end: I-35E in Dallas

Location
- Country: United States
- State: Texas

Highway system
- Highways in Texas; Interstate; US; State; Former; Toll; Loops; Spurs; FM/RM; Park; Rec
← SH 355	→ SH 357

State Highway 356 runs from State Highway 183 in Irving, Texas to Interstate 35E in Dallas, Texas.

== Route description ==
SH 356 begins at a junction with SH 183 in Irving. It heads east from this junction through Irving to an intersection with Loop 12. SH 356 reaches its eastern terminus at I-35E in Dallas.

It is known locally as Irving Boulevard for most of its length; a small section on the eastern end is designated as Commonwealth Boulevard, which connects Irving Boulevard to I-35E. It runs through downtown Irving and a heavily industrialized portion of Dallas between the Trinity River and State Highway 183.

== History ==
SH 356 was designated on August 8, 1946, running from State Highway 1 (Commerce Street) near the Triple Underpass (where Elm, Main and Commerce Streets meet) to SH 183 in Irving, replacing FM 684. The highway's eastern terminus was relocated to I-35E on August 28, 1958. The section of SH 356 between Sowers Road and Lee Street was removed from the state highway system and turned over to the city of Irving on October 30, 2003. On November 20, 2008, the section of SH 356 from the Trinity River Levee to I-35E was cancelled.

== Junction list ==
The entire route is in Dallas County.

Location	mi	km	Destinations	Notes
Irving	0.0	0.0	SH 183 (Airport Freeway) / Belt Line Road	Interchange
Irving	2.8	4.5	Sowers Road	SH 356 designation ends
Irving	Gap in route			
Irving	0.0	0.0	Lee Street	SH 356 designation resumes
Irving	1.0	1.6	Loop 12 (Walton Walker Boulevard)	Interchange
Irving	1.3	2.1	Trinity View Park	Interchange
Dallas	2.1	3.4	Regal Row	Interchange
1.000 mi = 1.609 km; 1.000 km = 0.621 mi
