= Texas State Highway 26 =

State highway in Texas

State Highway 26

Route information
- Maintained by TxDOT
- Length: 18.549 mi (29.852 km)
- Existed: April 4, 1980 (1917)–present

Major junctions
- South end: SH 183 in Haltom City
- I-820 in North Richland Hills; SH 114 / SH 121 in Grapevine
- North end: SH 121 / FM 2499 in Grapevine

Location
- Country: United States
- State: Texas
- Counties: Tarrant

Highway system
- Highways in Texas; Interstate; US; State; Former; Toll; Loops; Spurs; FM/RM; Park; Rec
| ← SH 25 | → I-27 |

State Highway 26 (SH 26) is a Texas state highway located completely within Tarrant County. SH 26 was designated on July 2, 1917. SH 26 terminates at Texas State Highway 183 and Texas State Highway 121. SH 26 was redesignated from its original location in East Texas to its current location in Tarrant County on April 4, 1980. SH 26 was the last of the original 26 state highways proposed in 1917.

== Route description ==
TX 26 begins in Haltom City at a juncture with TX 183 as it departs Belknap Street onto Baker-Hurst Boulevard. TX 26 continues on Belknap Street, heading northeast into Richland Hills. Eponymously titled Boulevard 26, the route proceeds into North Richland Hills, passing its city hall and moving under I-820. TX 26 connects with the southern terminus of FM 1938 and continues northeast, diagonally reaching local arterial roads and passing through the suburbs of Hurst and Colleyville. In the latter town, the route is named Colleyville Boulevard, and as it passes along the southern city limits of Southlake into Grapevine, it is named Ira E. Woods Avenue.

Inside Grapevine, TX 26 meets TX 114 at a folded diamond interchange, connecting TX 114's frontage roads with Ira E. Woods Avenue. The route turns right and becomes concurrent with TX 114, proceeding south. The two routes merge with the northbound TX 121, and all three continue to the east until TX 26 departs onto a frontage road and meets Texan Trail. This intersection forms the southern terminus of the former Loop 382, still signed as a business route of TX 114. TX 26 turns north onto Texan Trail, concurrent with the business route. At an intersection with Northwest Highway, TX 26 turns right, leaving behind TX 114's business route. The route then passes south of Lake Grapevine and Grapevine Mills, and terminates at the frontage roads of the northbound FM 2499, recently diverged from the northeast-bound TX 121.

== History ==
Historic SH 26

SH 26 designated on July 2, 1917 as a short route from Tyler through Henderson to Nacogdoches. On January 19, 1920, the section of SH 26 from Tyler to Henderson was cancelled, and SH 26 was instead rerouted to end in Overton. On November 27, 1922, the section of SH 26 from Henderson to Overton was cancelled. On August 21, 1923, SH 26 was extended northward to Longview over part of SH 43. On February 21, 1935, SH 26 Loop was designated in Kilgore. On September 26, 1939, it had been extended north to the Oklahoma state line via a proposed section of SH 149 and SH 11. SH 26 Loop was renumbered as Loop 66. On December 12, 1962, SH 26 was cancelled when U.S. Highway 259 was routed over its entire length.

On April 4, 1980, it was redesignated along the Spur 452 and the old route of SH 121 from Haltom City to I-820, then northeastward through Colleyville and Grapevine. On May 16, 1988, the section from SH 114 to BS 114-L (was Loop 382 until 1990) was cancelled. This is its current route.

SH 26A was a spur designated on October 26, 1925 from Longview to Tatum. It was extended south to Carthage by 1926 over part of SH 8, which was rerouted farther east. On March 19, 1930, this was renumbered as SH 149.

SH 26B was a spur designated On April 27, 1925, from SH 35 in Timpson to SH 26 west of Timpson. On July 13, 1925, SH 26B was shortened to end in Garrison. On July 27, 1925, it was extended back to Timpson. On March 19, 1930, this became an extension of SH 22.

== Major intersections ==
The entire route is in Tarrant County.

| Location | mi | km | Destinations | Notes |
|---|---|---|---|---|
| Haltom City | 0.0 | 0.0 | SH 183 (Baker Boulevard) | Interchange; southern terminus |
| Richland Hills–Fort Worth line | 0.7 | 1.1 | Spur 474 (Rufe Snow Drive) | |
| North Richland Hills | 2.4 | 3.9 | I-820 (Northeast Loop 820) / SH 121 / SH 183 (Airport Freeway) | I-820 south exit 22A, north exit 22B |
| North Richland Hills | 2.7 | 4.3 | FM 1938 north (Davis Boulevard) | Interchange |
| Hurst | 4.8 | 7.7 | FM 3029 (Precinct Line Road) | |
| Grapevine–Colleyville line | 12.0 | 19.3 | SH 114 west / SH 121 south (Northwest Parkway) | South end of freeway; south end of SH 114/121 overlap |
| Grapevine–Colleyville line | 13.6 | 21.9 | Main Street | |
| Grapevine–Colleyville line | 14.6 | 23.5 | SH 114 east / SH 121 north (Northwest Parkway) / Bus. SH 114 (Texan Trail) | North end of SH 114/121 overlap; south end of SH 114 Bus overlap |
| Grapevine–Colleyville line | 16.0 | 25.7 | Bus. SH 114 west (Northwest Highway) | North end of SH 114 Bus overlap |
| Grapevine–Colleyville line | 18.5 | 29.8 | SH 121 to I-635 / FM 2499 north | Interchange; northern terminus |
1.000 mi = 1.609 km; 1.000 km = 0.621 mi: Concurrency terminus
