= Northwest Highway =

Northwest Highway may refer to several highways in the United States:

- Northwest Highway (Texas)
- Northwest Highway (Illinois)
