= Texas State Highway Spur 482 =

Highway in Texas, United States

State Highway Spur 482
- Storey Lane

Route information
- Maintained by TxDOT
- Length: 2.212 mi (3.560 km)
- Existed: 1971–present

Major junctions
- West end: SH 183 in Irving
- East end: Loop 12 / Harry Hines Boulevard in Dallas

Location
- Country: United States
- State: Texas

Highway system
- Highways in Texas; Interstate; US; State; Former; Toll; Loops; Spurs; FM/RM; Park; Rec

Spur 482, also known as Storey Lane within Dallas, is a short connector route located in the Dallas area. The route originates at the site of the former Texas Stadium and ends northwest of Love Field.

== Route description ==
Spur 482 begins at State Highway 183 (SH 183) near the site of the former Texas Stadium and almost immediately has an interchange with SH 114. Crossing the Trinity River, the highway drops its freeway status and becomes a surface street. The highway crosses under Interstate 35E (I-35E) without any direct access and ends at a complex interchange with Loop 12/Harry Hines Boulevard.

== History ==
Spur 482 was designated on January 7, 1971, replacing a section of Loop 12.

The western terminus of Spur 482 is part of the Irving Diamond Interchange project. The project, also known as the Ultimate Diamond Interchange, is designed to relieve traffic on Loop 12 in the area and redo the interchanges with SH 183 and SH 114.

== Major intersections ==
The entire highway is in Dallas County.

Location	mi	km	Destinations	Notes
Irving	0.0	0.0	SH 183 west / Loop 12 south	Westbound exit and eastbound entrance; western terminus
Irving	0.3	0.48	SH 114 / SH 183 east – Grapevine	Westbound exit and eastbound entrance
Irving	0.4	0.64	Frontage Road	Eastbound exit and westbound entrance
Irving–Dallas line	1.2	1.9	Bridge over Elm Fork Trinity River; East end of freeway	
Dallas	2.2	3.5	Loop 12 (Northwest Highway) / Harry Hines Boulevard	Interchange; eastern terminus
1.000 mi = 1.609 km; 1.000 km = 0.621 mi: Incomplete access
