= List of state highway spurs in Texas (400–499) =

- Texas State Highway Spur marker

Highway names
- Interstates: Interstate Highway X (IH-X, I-X)
- US Highways: U.S. Highway X (US X)
- State: State Highway X (SH X)
- Loops: Loop X
- Spurs: Spur X
- Farm or Ranch to Market Roads: Farm to Market Road X (FM X); Ranch-to-Market Road X (RM X)
- Park Roads: Park Road X (PR X)

System links
- Highways in Texas; Interstate; US; State; Former; Toll; Loops; Spurs; FM/RM; Park; Rec

State highway spurs in Texas are owned and maintained by the Texas Department of Transportation (TxDOT).

== Spur 400 ==
State Highway Spur 400
- Location: Webb County
- Length: 1.174 mi (1.889 km)
- Existed: April 1, 1986–present

Spur 400 is located in Laredo. It runs from Arkansas Avenue along Clark Boulevard to Loop 20.

Spur 400 was designated on April 1, 1986, along the current route.

== Spur 406 ==
State Highway Spur 406
- Location: Val Verde County
- Length: 3.718 mi (5.984 km)
- Existed: October 27, 1967–present

Spur 406 is located in Val Verde County. It runs from US 90 to Amistad Reservoir.

Spur 406 was designated on October 27, 1967, as a redesignation of Loop 406 after a small section was transferred to Spur 454 and the remainder was removed altogether.

== Spur 407 ==
State Highway Spur 407
- Location: Nueces County
- Existed: February 26, 1965–February 27, 2025

Spur 407 was located in Corpus Christi. It ran from I-37 and Alta Loma Road to downtown Corpus Christi.

Spur 407 was designated on February 26, 1965, on the current route along an old routing of SH 9; the route was signed as SH 9 Business during construction of IH 37. The road was decommissioned on February 27, 2025, as TxDOT no longer needed it.

== Spur 408 ==
State Highway Spur 408
- Location: Dallas County
- Length: 4.270 mi (6.872 km)
- Existed: March 31, 1965–present

Spur 408 is located in Dallas. It runs from I-20 to Loop 12.

Spur 408 was designated on March 31, 1965, on the current route.

== Spur 412 ==
State Highway Spur 412
- Location: McLennan County
- Length: 2.057 mi (3.310 km)
- Existed: March 31, 1965–present

Spur 412 is located in Waco. It runs from SH 6 to a point 2.2 miles (3.5 km) east, at 503 feet above sea level near Speegleville Park.

Spur 412 was designated on March 31, 1965, on the current route along an old routing of SH 6.

== Spur 413 ==
State Highway Spur 413
- Location: Willacy County
- Length: 0.390 mi (628 m)
- Existed: July 30, 1965–present

Spur 413 is located in Sebastian. It runs from Bus. US 77 to I-69E/US 77.

Spur 413 was designated on July 30, 1965, on the current route.

== Spur 414 ==
State Highway Spur 414
- Location: Sabine County
- Length: 0.955 mi (1,537 m)
- Existed: July 29, 1965–present

Spur 414 is located in McElroy. It runs from US 96 south of Pineland to Sam Rayburn Reservoir.

Spur 414 was designated on July 29, 1965, on the current route along an old routing of US 96.

== Spur 417 ==
State Highway Spur 417
- Location: McLennan County
- Existed: October 15, 1965–June 21, 1990

Spur 417 was designated on October 15, 1965, from US 287 (now US 70/US 287) northwest of Vernon to US 70 (now Loop 488) in Vernon along an old routing of US 287. The route was signed as US 287 Business rather than Spur 417. On June 21, 1990, Spur 417 was cancelled and transferred to Bus. US 287.

== Spur 419 ==
State Highway Spur 419
- Location: Brazoria County
- Length: 0.970 mi (1,561 m)
- Existed: May 30, 2013–present

Spur 419 is located in Old Ocean. It runs from CR 374 to SH 35.

Spur 419 was designated on May 30, 2013, as a redesignation of Loop 419 when a section was returned to Brazoria County.

== Spur 421 ==
State Highway Spur 421
- Location: Bexar County
- Length: 6.013 mi (9.677 km)
- Existed: November 16, 1965–present

Spur 421 is located in San Antonio. It runs from I-410/SH 16 to I-10/US 87.

Spur 421 was designated on November 16, 1965, on the current route as a replacement of SH 16, which was rerouted along I-410.

== Spur 422 ==
State Highway Spur 422
- Location: Bexar County
- Length: 1.660 mi (2.672 km)
- Existed: November 16, 1965–present

Spur 422 is located in San Antonio. It runs from I-35 in southern San Antonio to I-410/SH 16.

Spur 422 was designated on November 16, 1965, on the current route as a replacement of SH 16, which was rerouted along I-410.

== Spur 423 ==
State Highway Spur 423
- Location: Franklin County
- Length: 1.885 mi (3.034 km)
- Existed: November 22, 1965–present

Spur 423 is located in Mount Vernon. It runs from US 67 to I-30.

Spur 423 was designated on November 22, 1965, on the current route as a replacement of a section of FM 899.

== Spur 425 ==
State Highway Spur 425
- Location: Cameron County
- Length: 0.3 mi (480 m)
- Existed: June 24, 2010–present

Spur 425 is located in Brownsville. It runs from a Border Safety Inspection Facility at the Mexico border eastward to I-69E/US 77/US 83.

Spur 425 was designated on June 24, 2010, on the current route.

== Spur 433 ==
State Highway Spur 433
- Location: Hidalgo County
- Length: 0.787 mi (1,267 m)
- Existed: August 5, 1966–present

Spur 433 is located in Donna. It runs from US 83 to US 83 Business (former Loop 374).

Spur 433 was designated on August 5, 1966, on the current route.

== Spur 435 ==
State Highway Spur 435
- Location: Grayson County
- Existed: August 31, 1966–?

Spur 435 was designated on August 31, 1966, as a spur off Park Road 20 to the marina in Eisenhower State Park. Spur 435 was cancelled and transferred to PR 20.

== Spur 437 ==
State Highway Spur 437
- Location: Ellis County
- Length: 1.091 mi (1.756 km)
- Existed: January 3, 1967–present

Spur 437 is located in Ennis. It runs from SH 34 along Clay Street to US 287.

Spur 437 was designated on January 3, 1967, on the current route.

=== Spur 437 (1966) ===
State Highway Spur 437
- Location: Ellis County
- Existed: October 3, 1966–January 3, 1967

The original Spur 437 was in Ennis along Preston Street instead of Clay Street. It was formed on October 3, 1966, and was cancelled on January 3, 1967.

== Spur 440 ==
=== Spur 440 (1966) ===
State Highway Spur 440
- Location: Ellis County
- Existed: 1966–1972

The first use of the Spur 440 designation was in Ellis County as a spur of SH 34 in Ennis. Spur 440 was cancelled in 1972.

=== Spur 440 (1972) ===
State Highway Spur 440
- Location: Wise County
- Existed: May 31, 1972–June 21, 1990

The next use of the Spur 440 designation was in Wise County. It is now Bus. SH 114.

== Spur 447 ==
State Highway Spur 447
- Location: Wichita County
- Length: 1.376 mi (2.214 km)
- Existed: April 27, 1967–present

Spur 447 is located in Wichita Falls. It runs from US 82/US 287 to SH 240.

Spur 447 was designated on April 27, 1967, on the current route.

== Spur 449 ==
State Highway Spur 449
- Location: Harrison County
- Length: 1.109 mi (1.785 km)
- Existed: June 1, 1967–present

Spur 449 is located in Harrison County. It runs from SH 43 to FM 134 at Karnack.

Spur 449 was designated on June 1, 1967, on the current route as a replacement of section of SH 43.

== Spur 450 ==
State Highway Spur 450
- Location: Ector County
- Length: 2.715 mi (4.369 km)
- Existed: September 26, 1967–present

Spur 450 is located in Odessa. It runs from SH 302/Loop 338 to US 385.

Spur 450 was designated on September 26, 1967, on the current route along an old routing of SH 302.

== Spur 452 ==
State Highway Spur 452
- Location: Tarrant County
- Existed: September 26, 1967–April 14, 1980

Spur 452 was designated on September 26, 1967, from SH 183 in Fort Worth northeast to I-820 as a replacement of a section of SH 121. On April 14, 1980, Spur 452 was cancelled and transferred to SH 26.

== Spur 454 ==
State Highway Spur 454
- Location: Val Verde County
- Length: 0.684 mi (1,101 m)
- Existed: October 27, 1967–present

Spur 454 is located in Val Verde County. It runs from US 90 to Amistad Reservoir.

Spur 454 was designated on October 27, 1967, on the current route as a replacement of a section of Loop 406.

== Spur 458 ==
State Highway Spur 458
- Location: Fayette County
- Length: 0.966 mi (1,555 m)
- Existed: November 1, 1968–present

Spur 458 is located in Fayette County. It runs from US 290 in Carmine to SH 237.

Spur 458 was designated on November 1, 1968, on the current route along an old routing of US 290.

== Spur 459 ==
State Highway Spur 459
- Location: San Patricio County
- Length: 0.966 mi (1,555 m)
- Existed: May 31, 1971–present

Spur 459 is located in Mathis. It runs from I-37 to SH 359.

Spur 459 was designated on May 31, 1971, as a replacement of a section of SH 9.

=== Spur 459 (1968) ===
State Highway Spur 459
- Location: Tarrant County
- Existed: February 29, 1968–July 31, 1969

The original Spur 459 was designated on July 31, 1969, from SH 121, 2 miles (3.2 km) northeast of Grapevine, south to a proposed rerouting of SH 114 east of Grapevine. Spur 459 was cancelled on July 31, 1969, and became a portion of SH 121.

== Spur 460 ==
State Highway Spur 460
- Location: Bee County
- Existed: February 29, 1968–October 16, 1979

Spur 460 was designated on February 29, 1968, in Beeville from then-proposed US 181 southwest along Charco Road to then-US 181 (later Loop 516, now Bus. US 181). On October 16, 1979, Spur 460 was cancelled and transferred to FM 3355.

== Spur 465 ==
State Highway Spur 465
- Location: Tarrant County
- Length: 0.966 mi (1,555 m)
- Existed: May 23, 1968–present

Spur 465 is located in Tarrant County. It runs from I-20 (former I-820) to SH 183 (former Loop 820).

== Spur 468 ==
State Highway Spur 468
- Location: Potter County
- Length: 2.392 mi (3.850 km)
- Existed: August 2, 1968–present

Spur 468 is located in Amarillo. It runs from I-40 exit 76 north to Rick Husband Amarillo International Airport.

Spur 468 was designated on August 2, 1968, on the current route.

== Spur 469 ==
State Highway Spur 469
- Location: Ellis County
- Length: 1.935 mi (3.114 km)
- Existed: November 20, 1997–present

Spur 469 is located in Ennis. It runs from I-45 to Business I-45.

Spur 469 was designated on November 20, 1997, on the current route.

=== Spur 469 (1969) ===
State Highway Spur 469
- Location: Lamar County
- Existed: May 28, 1969–June 21, 1990

The original Spur 469 was designated on May 28, 1969, from US 82 near western Paris east along Bonham Street and Lamar Avenue to US 82 near eastern Paris. The route was signed as US 82 Business rather than Spur 469. On June 21, 1990, Spur 469 was cancelled and transferred to Bus. US 82.

== Spur 470 ==
State Highway Spur 470
- Location: Shelby County
- Length: 0.702 mi (1,130 m)
- Existed: August 14, 1968–present

Spur 470 is located in Timpson. It runs from US 59/US 84 to SH 87.

Spur 470 was designated on August 14, 1968, on the current route along an old routing of US 59/US 84.

== Spur 471 ==
State Highway Spur 471
- Location: Bexar County
- Length: 1.000 mi (1.609 km)
- Existed: December 18, 2014–present

Spur 471 is located in Leon Valley. It runs from western Leon Valley to SH 16.

Spur 471 was designated on December 18, 2014, on the current route as a replacement of a section of FM 471.

=== Spur 471 (1968) ===
State Highway Spur 471
- Location: Mitchell County
- Existed: October 1, 1968–June 21, 1990

The original Spur 471 was designated on October 1, 1968, from I-20 north of Colorado City south to Loop 377 (now Business I-20) in Colorado City along an old routing of SH 208. The route was signed as SH 208 Business rather than Spur 471. On June 21, 1990, Spur 471 was cancelled and transferred to Bus. SH 208.

== Spur 474 ==
State Highway Spur 474
- Location: Tarrant County
- Length: 0.673 mi (1,083 m)
- Existed: July 1, 1969–present

Spur 474 is located in North Richland Hills. It runs from SH 183 to Onyx Drive.

Spur 474 was designated on July 1, 1969, on the current route.

== Spur 479 ==
State Highway Spur 479
- Location: Tarrant County
- Existed: May 16, 1969–December 17, 2009

Spur 479 was designated on May 16, 1969, in Wichita Falls from Holliday Street (then US 82) to Scott Street (then Loop 370, now Bus. US 287) along an old routing of US 82. The same day the route was corrected to run along Sixth Street and was signed as US 82 Business rather than Spur 479. On May 26, 1983, the western terminus was moved to Broad Street (then US 281). On December 17, 2009, Spur 479 was cancelled and returned to the city of Wichita Falls.

== Spur 482 ==
State Highway Spur 482
- Location: Dallas County
- Length: 2.212 mi (3.560 km)
- Existed: January 7, 1971–present

Spur 482 is located in Dallas. It runs from SH 183 to Loop 354.

Spur 482 was designated on January 7, 1971, on the current route as a replacement of a section of Loop 12 when it was rerouted on top of Spur 348.

== Spur 484 ==
State Highway Spur 484
- Location: Dallas County
- Existed: January 30, 1970–October 31, 1979

Spur 484 was designated on January 30, 1970, from Loop 635 (now I-635) south along and near Valley View Lane to Loop 9 (now SH 161) near Belt Line Road. On October 31, 1979, Spur 484 was cancelled and transferred to SH 161.

== Spur 486 ==
State Highway Spur 486
- Location: Cameron County
- Length: 1.007 mi (1.621 km)
- Existed: January 30, 1970–present

Spur 486 is located in San Benito. It runs from I-69E/US 77/US 83 to Bus. US 77.

Spur 486 was designated on January 30, 1970, on the current route.

== Spur 487 ==
State Highway Spur 487
- Location: Hidalgo County
- Existed: January 30, 1970–December 19, 1996

Spur 487 was designated on January 30, 1970, from Loop 374 (now Bus. US 83) in McAllen south along Ware Road to US 83. On December 19, 1996, by district request, Spur 487 was cancelled and transferred to UR 2220 (now FM 2220) to provide a continuous route for FM 2220.

== Spur 490 ==
State Highway Spur 490
- Location: Eastland County
- Length: 1.321 mi (2.126 km)
- Existed: May 7, 1970–present

Spur 490 is located in Eastland. It runs from SH 6 (former US 80) to I-20.

Spur 490 was designated on May 7, 1970, on the current route.

== Spur 492 ==
State Highway Spur 492
- Location: Ector County
- Existed: June 4, 1970–April 26, 1983

Spur 492 was designated on June 4, 1970, from Grandview Avenue in Odessa east to Loop 338, replacing FM 2399. Two months later the road was extended to Loop 338 east of Odessa. Spur 492 was cancelled on April 26, 1983, and transferred to SH 191.

== Spur 498 ==
State Highway Spur 498
- Location: Harris County
- Existed: April 29, 1971–July 28, 1977

Spur 498 designated on April 29, 1971, from SH 146 to Spur 501 in LaPorte via Wharton Weems Blvd. This was cancelled on July 28, 1977, and mileage was transferred to rerouted Loop 410 (not to be confused with I-410), whose alignment on Fairmont Parkway was cancelled and given to the city of LaPorte.
