= Desert, Texas =

- Unincorporated community
- Location within Texas Location within the United States
- Coordinates: 33°23′18″N 96°24′07″W
- Country: United States
- State: Texas
- County: Collin
- Elevation: 702 ft (214 m)
- Time zone: UTC-6 (Central (CST))
  - Summer (DST): UTC-5 (CDT)
- GNIS feature ID: 1355937

Desert is an unincorporated community in Collin County, located in the U.S. state of Texas. According to the Handbook of Texas, the community had a population of 25 in 2000. It is located within the Dallas-Fort Worth Metroplex.

== History ==
The area in what is known as Desert today was first settled around 1890. It was named for a creek that runs just outside of it. A post office was established at Desert in 1893 and remained in operation until 1904. It has served as a retail center for most of its history, with a general store, a church, and a gristmill. It never had more than 100 residents in its vicinity. The population was estimated at 25 from 1933 through 2000.

== Geography ==
Desert is located on Texas State Highway 160 in far-northeastern Collin County, near the intersection of the Grayson and Fannin County lines.

== Education ==
Desert once had its own school. Today the community is served by the Trenton Independent School District.

== See also ==
- Texas State Highway 78
