= Interstate 635 (Texas) =

Highway in Texas

Interstate 635
- Lyndon B. Johnson Freeway
- I-635 highlighted in red

Route information
- Auxiliary route of I-35
- Maintained by TxDOT
- Length: 37 mi (60 km)
- Existed: October 1, 1959–present
- NHS: Entire route

Major junctions
- South end: I-20 in Balch Springs
- US 80 in Mesquite; I-30 / US 67 in Mesquite; US 75 in Dallas; Dallas North Tollway at Dallas-Farmers Branch; I-35E / US 77 in Dallas; Pres. George Bush Turnpike in Irving
- West end: SH 121 / International Parkway near DFW Airport

Location
- Country: United States
- State: Texas
- Counties: Dallas, Tarrant

Highway system
- Interstate Highway System; Main; Auxiliary; Suffixed; Business; Future; Highways in Texas; Interstate; US; State; Former; Toll; Loops; Spurs; FM/RM; Park; Rec
← I-610	→ I-820

Interstate 635 (I-635 (Note: Some sources use "IH-635", as "IH" is an abbreviation used by TxDOT for Interstate Highways.)) is a 37-mile-long (60 km) partial loop around Dallas, Texas, in the United States between I-20 in Balch Springs and SH 121 at the north entrance of the DFW Airport in Grapevine. It intersects I-35E at exits 27B and 27C but does not connect with I-35W. I-635 and a part of I-20 are collectively designated as the Lyndon B. Johnson Freeway; known locally as the LBJ Freeway, or simply LBJ. The roadway is named after Lyndon B. Johnson, the former U.S. senator from Texas and the 37th vice-president and 36th president of the U.S. Where I-635 ends at I-20, I-20 continues the LBJ Freeway designation heading west. Since the portion of I-20 between Spur 408 to I-635 retains the same names as I-635, the two highways are considered three-quarters of the beltway around Dallas. Together with Spur 408, a portion of Loop 12, and a portion of I-35E, I-635 and I-20 complete the beltway.

== Route description ==
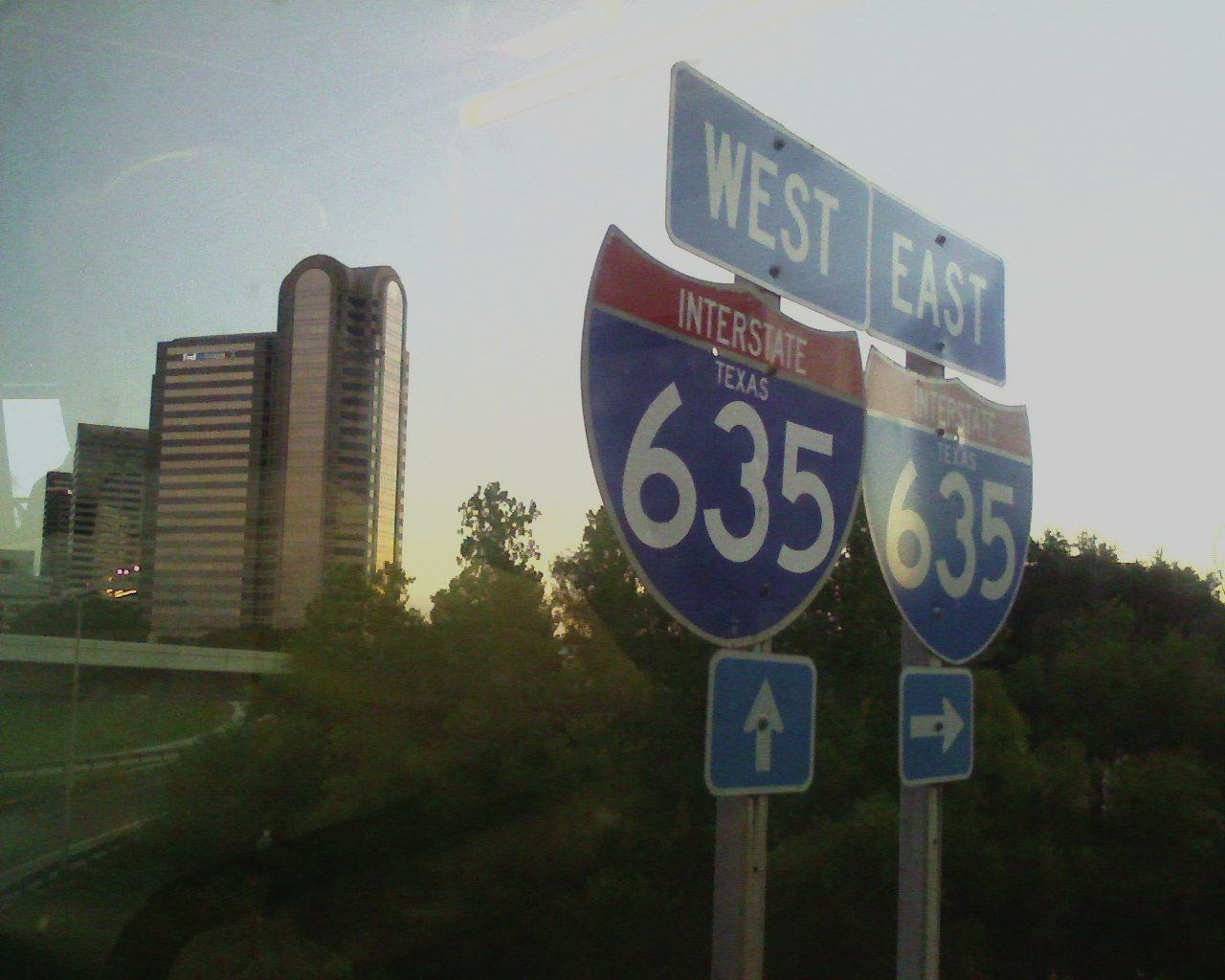
I-635 signage on the DNT frontage road. Galleria Dallas can be seen in the background.

I-635 begins at an intersection with I-20 in southeast Dallas and travels northward through Balch Springs into Mesquite, where it intersects US 80 at exits 6A and 6B and I-30 at exits 8A and 8B. The route then turns to the northwest, continuing near the border between Dallas and Garland. Six miles (9.7 km) later, it takes a general westward turn as it intersects US 75 at exits 19A and 19B at the High Five Interchange. The section from I-35E to US 75 (Central Expressway) is one of the busiest stretches of road in the Dallas–Fort Worth metroplex, at virtually all hours of the day and night. The route continues west, intersecting the Dallas North Tollway at exits 22B and 22C and its original terminus, I-35E in Farmers Branch at exits 27B and 27C. The freeway then continues to the northwest, intersecting the President George Bush Turnpike at exit 30 westbound and exit 29B eastbound in Irving before arriving at its final terminus at SH 121 at the north entrance to the DFW Airport.

== History ==
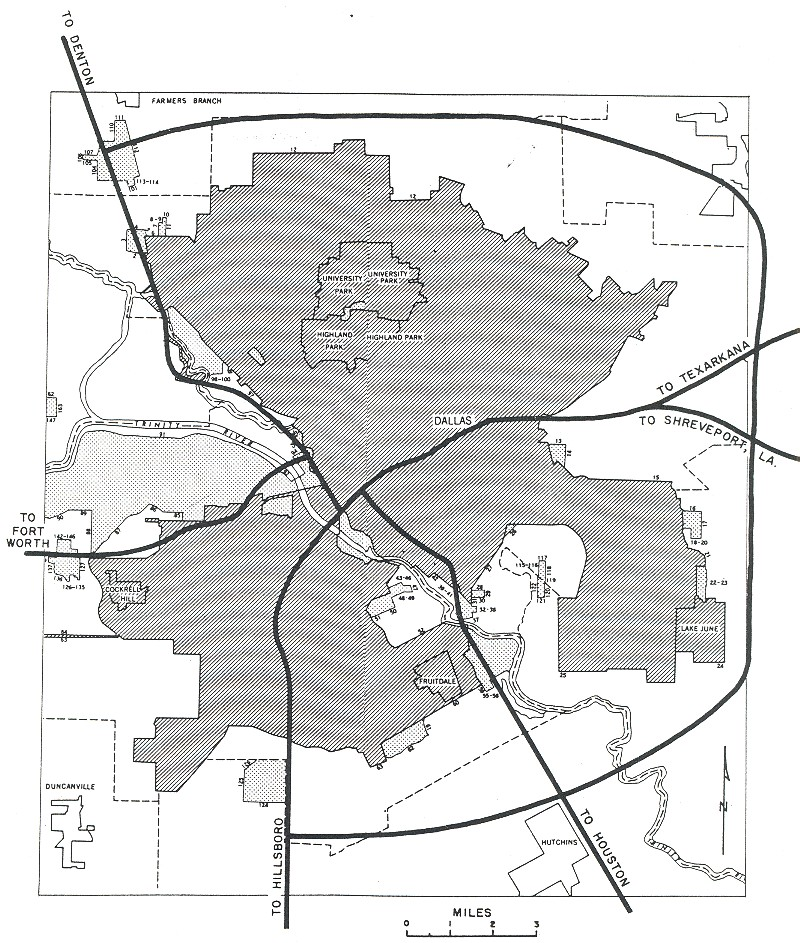
A 1955 map of the Interstate Highway plan

I-635 was originally designated by the Texas Department of Transportation (TxDOT) in 1959 as a loop around the east side of Dallas, connecting with I-35E to the northwest and southwest sides of the city.

In January 1969, the first section to open to motorists was a 10-mile (16 km) section from US 75 (now SH 310) near Hutchins to Barnes Bridge in Mesquite. In February 1970, the highway from US 75 westward to I-35E northwest of Dallas opened to traffic. The I-635 designation was truncated on December 2, 1971, when I-20 was rerouted south of Dallas, taking over 13 miles (21 km) of I-635's former route.

The connecting section of I-20 from the west was not completed until 1978. Initially, the section between I-35E and US 80 in southeast Dallas was concurrent with I-20. When the outlet for I-20 from southeast of Dallas to Terrell was completed, the I-635 designation was removed from I-35E to its intersection with I-20.

On April 1, 1968, Loop 635 was designated from I-35E and I-635 to Spur 459 at the north entrance of DFW Airport. Spur 459 became part of a rerouted SH 121 on July 31, 1969. On July 31, 1974, Loop 635 was redesignated as part of I-635, and this section was opened in the 1980s.

=== Later changes ===
The High Five construction project (so called because it is five levels and rises almost 120 feet [37 m] above the lowest level), a rebuild of the interchange of I-635 and US 75, was opened for traffic in February 2006. This interchange carries over 500,000 vehicles per day and was built as the largest interchange in the state of Texas to handle this vehicle load.

=== Express project ===
A $2.7-billion (equivalent to $3.81 billion in 2025) project was started on May 16, 2011, to widen I-635 and dig subsequent high-occupancy toll lane tunnels beneath the primary roadway from I-35E to the High Five Interchange, a length of eight miles (13 km). Construction time was estimated in 2011 at five years and was completed and opened for traffic on September 10, 2015. The new highway features tolled express lanes, known as TEXpress lanes, in between the mainlanes or underneath them. The cost to drive on them fluctuates based on the current flow of traffic at the time. The project is among several billion dollar plus projects in the planning phase in and around downtown Dallas along with the rebuild of the I-35E/I-30 "Mixmaster".

== Exit list ==
County	Location	mi	km	Exit	Destinations	Notes
Dallas	Balch Springs	0.0	0.0		I-20 west – Ft Worth	Southern terminus; Exit 480 (I-20); former I-635 south
Dallas	Balch Springs	0.0	0.0		US 175 – Kaufman, Dallas	Northbound entrance only; Exits 479A-B (I-20)
Dallas	Balch Springs	0.1	0.16	1C	I-20 east – Shreveport	Southbound exit and northbound entrance; Exit 480B (I-20)
Dallas	Balch Springs	0.4	0.64	1A	Seagoville Road	
Dallas	Balch Springs	1.5	2.4	1B	Elam Road	
Dallas	Balch Springs	2.6	4.2	2	Lake June Road	
Dallas	Mesquite	3.6	5.8	3	W Cartwright Road / Bruton Road	
Dallas	Mesquite	5.0	8.0	4	SH 352 (Military Parkway / Scyene Road)	
Dallas	Mesquite	5.9	9.5	5	Gross Road / Galloway Avenue	Galloway Avenue not signed southbound
Dallas	Mesquite	6.6	10.6	6	US 80 – Dallas, Terrell	Signed as exits 6A (WEST) and 6B (EAST)
Dallas	Mesquite	8.1	13.0	7A	Towne Centre Drive	Southbound exit and northbound entrance
Dallas	Mesquite	7.5	12.1	7B	Town East Boulevard	Signed as exit 7 northbound
Dallas	Mesquite	8.7	14.0	8	I-30 – Dallas, Texarkana	Signed on I-30 as Exit(s) 56A (South) and 56B (North)
Dallas	Mesquite			—	I-635 Express north	Future southern terminus of I-635 Express Lanes.
Dallas	Mesquite	9.3	15.0	9	Oates Drive, Galloway Avenue	
Dallas	Mesquite			—	Express Lanes	Closed; was northbound exit and southbound entrance
Dallas	Mesquite–Garland line	10.8	17.4	10	La Prada Drive	
Dallas	Garland	11.4	18.3	11A	Centerville Road / Ferguson Road	
Dallas	Garland	11.8	19.0	11B	Northwest Highway, Shiloh Road	
Dallas	Garland	12.5	20.1	12	SH 78 (Garland Road)	Northbound exit and entrance and southbound entrance
Dallas	Garland–Dallas line	13.9	22.4	13	Jupiter Road, Kingsley Road / Walnut Hill Lane	
Dallas	Dallas			—	Express Lanes	Closed; was westbound exit and eastbound entrance to Managed HOV Lane
Dallas	Dallas	15.2	24.5	14	Plano Road / Church Road / New Church Road	
Dallas	Dallas	16.0	25.7	15	Miller Road / Royal Lane	Access to LBJ/Skillman Station
Dallas	Dallas	16.6	26.7	16	Skillman Street / Audelia Road	Westbound exit via exit 15; Audelia Road not signed westbound
Dallas	Dallas			—	Express Lanes	Closed; westbound exit and eastbound entrance to Managed HOV Lane
Dallas	Dallas	17.6	28.3	17	Forest Lane, Abrams Road	
Dallas	Dallas	18.2	29.3	18A	Greenville Avenue, TI Boulevard	Signed as exit 18 westbound; eastbound signed as "Greenville Ave" only
Dallas	Dallas			—	Express Lanes	Closed; eastbound exit and westbound entrance to Managed HOV Lane
Dallas	Dallas			—	I-635 Express west	Eastern terminus of managed HOV Lanes; westbound exit and eastbound entrance
Dallas	Dallas	19.5	31.4	18B	TI Boulevard	Westbound access is part of exit 18; to LBJ/Central Station
Dallas	Dallas	19.5	31.4	—	TI Boulevard	Managed HOV Lanes access only
Dallas	Dallas	18.8	30.3	19A	US 75 – Dallas, McKinney	High Five Interchange; Exit 21 (US 75)
Dallas	Dallas	18.8	30.3	—	US 75 north (HOV Lanes) to Spring Creek Parkway	Managed HOV Lanes access only; westbound exit and eastbound entrance
Dallas	Dallas	19.6	31.5	19B	Coit Road	
Dallas	Dallas	20.2	32.5	20	Park Central Drive, Hillcrest Road	Access to Managed HOV Lanes Eastbound
Dallas	Dallas	21.5	34.6	21	SH 289 (Preston Road) / Montfort Drive	
Dallas	Farmers Branch–Dallas line	22.8	36.7	22A	Dallas Parkway, Inwood Road, Montfort Drive, Welch Road	No direct eastbound exit (signed at exit 22C)
Dallas	Farmers Branch–Dallas line	23.2	37.3	22B-C	Dallas North Tollway	Signed as exits 22B (NORTH) and 22C (SOUTH)
Dallas	Farmers Branch–Dallas line	24.1	38.8	23	Midway Road, Welch Road	
Dallas	Farmers Branch–Dallas line	25.2	40.6	24	Marsh Ln	Access to Managed HOV Lanes Eastbound
Dallas	Farmers Branch–Dallas line	25.8	41.5	25	Webb Chapel Road, Josey Ln, Denton Drive/Harry Hines Boulevard	Direct exit from Managed HOV lanes
Dallas	Dallas				I-35E Express – Dallas, Denton	Westbound exit and eastbound entrance from Managed HOV Lanes
Dallas	Dallas	27.8	44.7	27B-C	I-35E – Dallas, Denton	Signed as exits 27B (NORTH) and 27C (SOUTH); Exits 440B-C (I-35E)
Dallas	Dallas			—	I-635 Express east	Western terminus of Managed HOV lanes
Dallas	Farmers Branch	29.0	46.7	28	Luna Road	
Dallas	Irving	30.0	48.3	29/30 (WB) 29A-B (EB)	Pres. George Bush Turnpike / Las Colinas Boulevard	Signed as exits 29 (NORTH) and 30 (SOUTH / Las Colinas Boulevard) westbound, 29A (SOUTH) and 29B (NORTH) eastbound
Dallas	Irving	30.7	49.4	31	MacArthur Boulevard	Access to Las Colinas Medical Center
Dallas	Irving	31.9	51.3	31B	Olympus Boulevard	Eastbound exit via exit 31
Dallas	Coppell–Irving line	32.8	52.8	33	Belt Line Road	
Dallas	Coppell–Irving line	34.9	56.2	34	Freeport Parkway	
Dallas	Coppell	35.8	57.6	35	Royal Lane	
Tarrant	Grapevine	36.6	58.9	36C	Bass Pro Drive/Bethel Road	Westbound exit and eastbound entrance
Tarrant	Grapevine	36.7	59.1	36A	SH 121 south / SH 114 – Ft Worth, DFW Airport, Dallas	Westbound exit and eastbound entrance
Tarrant	Grapevine	36.9	59.4	36B	SH 121 north / FM 2499 north (Grapevine Mills Parkway) / Stars and Stripes Way – McKinney	Western terminus
1.000 mi = 1.609 km; 1.000 km = 0.621 mi: Closed/former; Electronic toll collection; Incomplete access

== See also ==
- List of memorials to Lyndon B. Johnson
