= Interstate 35E (Texas) =

Highway in Texas

Interstate 35E
- Stemmons Freeway
- I-35E highlighted in red

Route information
- Maintained by TxDOT
- Length: 96.7 mi (155.6 km)
- Existed: 1959–present
- NHS: Entire route

Major junctions
- South end: I-35 / I-35W / US 77 in Hillsboro
- US 287 in Waxahachie; I-20 in Dallas; I-30 / US 67 in Dallas; Dallas North Tollway in Dallas; I-635 in Dallas; Pres. George Bush Turnpike in Carrollton; Sam Rayburn Tollway in Lewisville; US 77 in Denton
- North end: I-35 / I-35W in Denton

Location
- Country: United States
- State: Texas
- Counties: Hill, Ellis, Dallas, Denton

Highway system
- Interstate Highway System; Main; Auxiliary; Suffixed; Business; Future; Highways in Texas; Interstate; US; State; Former; Toll; Loops; Spurs; FM/RM; Park; Rec
← I-35	→ I-35W

Interstate 35E (I-35E (Note: Some sources use "IH-35E", as "IH" is an abbreviation used by the Texas Department of Transportation for Interstate Highways.)), a north–south Interstate Highway, is the eastern half of I-35, where it splits to serve the Dallas–Fort Worth metropolitan area. I-35 splits into two branch routes, I-35W and I-35E, at Hillsboro. I-35E travels north for 97 miles (156 km), maintaining I-35's sequence of exit numbers. It travels through Dallas before rejoining with I-35W to reform I-35 in Denton.

During the early years of the Interstate Highway System, branching Interstates with directional suffixes, such as N, S, E, and W, were common nationwide. On every other Interstate nationwide, these directional suffixes have been phased out by redesignating the suffixed route numbers with a loop or spur route number designation (such as I-270 in Maryland, which was once I-70S) or, in some cases, were assigned a different route number (such as I-76, which was once I-80S). In the case of I-35 in the Dallas–Fort Worth area, since neither branch is clearly the main route and both branches return to a unified Interstate beyond the cities of Dallas and Fort Worth, the American Association of State Highway and Transportation Officials has allowed the suffixes of E and W in Texas to remain to the present day. I-35 also splits into I-35E and I-35W in Minneapolis–St. Paul, Minnesota, for similar reasons as the I-35 split in the Dallas–Fort Worth area.

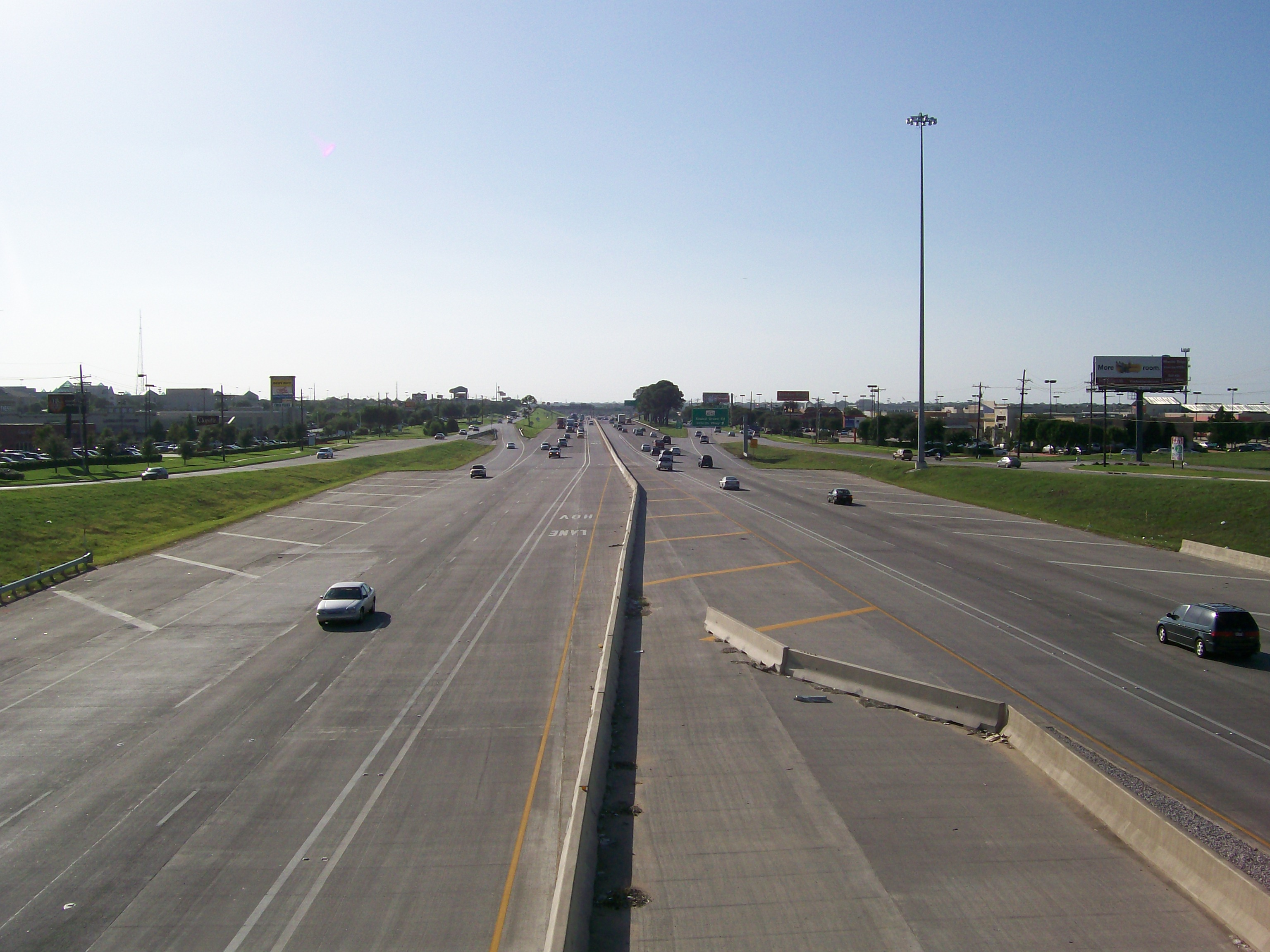
I-35E in Lewisville looking north from SH 121 in 2007

== Route description ==
=== Concurrent routes ===
==== U.S. Highway 67 ====
I-35E travels concurrently with US 67 from just north of Kiest Boulevard in the Oak Cliff area of Dallas to the I-30 interchange in Downtown Dallas. From there, US 67 joins with I-30. On both segments, US 67 is unsigned.

==== U.S. Highway 77 ====
From Waco, Texas, to El Dorado, Kansas, I-35 (or I-35E) typically runs concurrent with or lies fairly close to US 77. This highway travels parallel to I-35E after splitting off of I-35 north of Hillsboro, running through Italy and Milford. It joins with I-35E for less than one mile (1.6 km) just south of Waxahachie before splitting back off to run through Waxahachie. It rejoins the Interstate just north of a junction with State Highway 342 (SH 342) in Red Oak. US 77 stays with the Interstate through Dallas and up to the southeastern section of Denton. It then breaks off, rejoining I-35 north of the city. Except for the spur sections (Denton and the section between Red Oak and Hillsboro) and the portion from I-635 to the split in Denton, US 77 is unsigned.

=== From the Dallas–Ellis county line to Denton ===
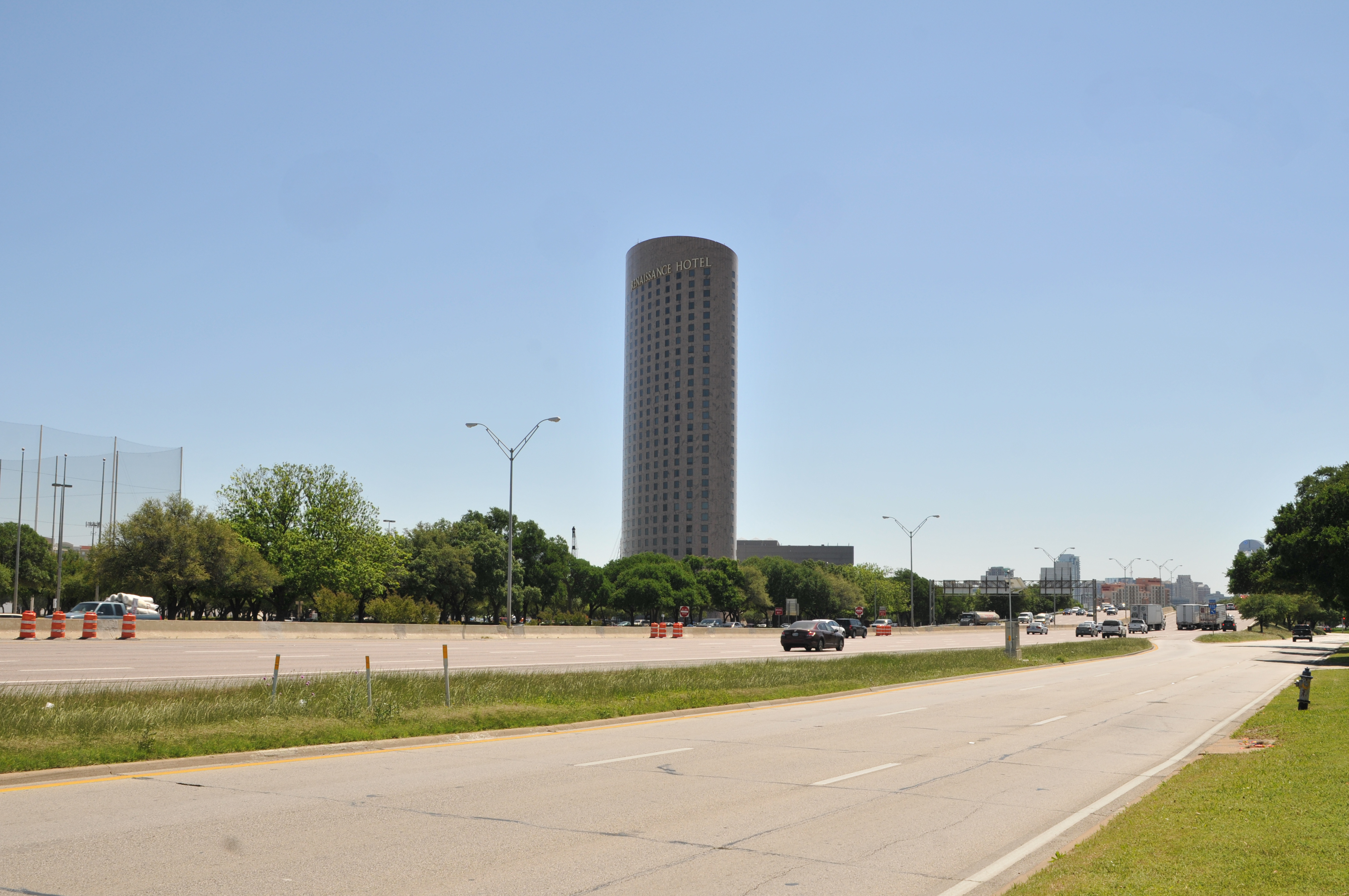
I-35E with Renaissance Dallas Hotel at 2222 Stemmons Freeway in the background

From the Dallas–Ellis county line to Downtown Dallas, I-35E is called South R.L. Thornton Freeway and varies from 8 to 10 lanes plus HOV. The section from I-20 to Downtown Dallas underwent a major reconstruction by 2015 to 12 lanes. Reconstruction of I-35E and the downtown Mixmaster interchange with I-30 is planned as part of the Horseshoe Project, derived from the larger Pegasus Project. From this point, I-35E is named the Stemmons Freeway to Lewisville. This section will undergo reconstruction in three phases. The first, a widening of I-35E from I-635 to Denton, will start in late 2011 to over 16 lanes. The second, the LBJ Project, included elevated toll I-35E lanes by 2016. Last is the major reconstruction of the Stemmons Freeway from Downtown Dallas to I-635 to over 20 lanes by 2020.

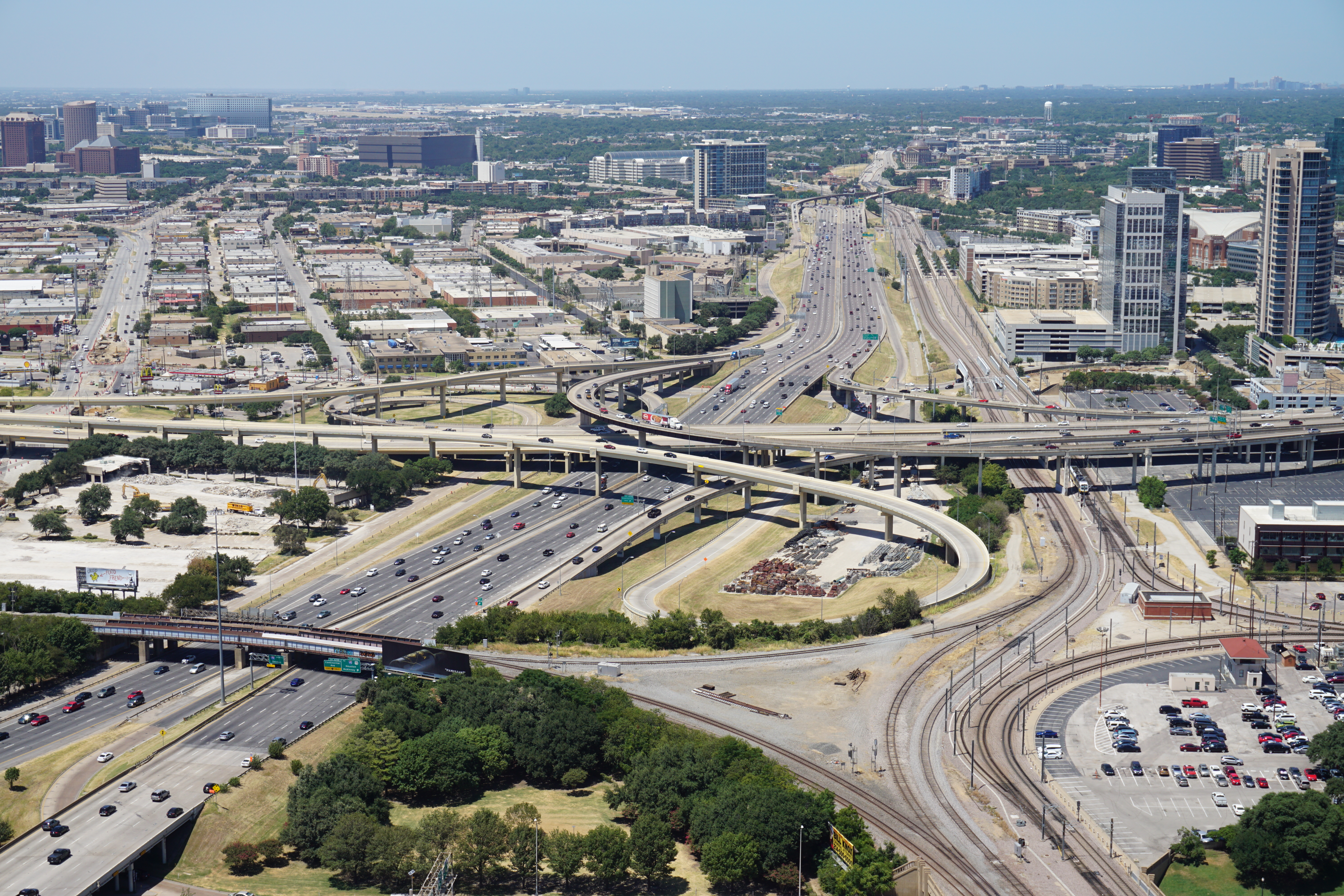
I-35E interchange with State Highway Spur 366 (Spur 366)

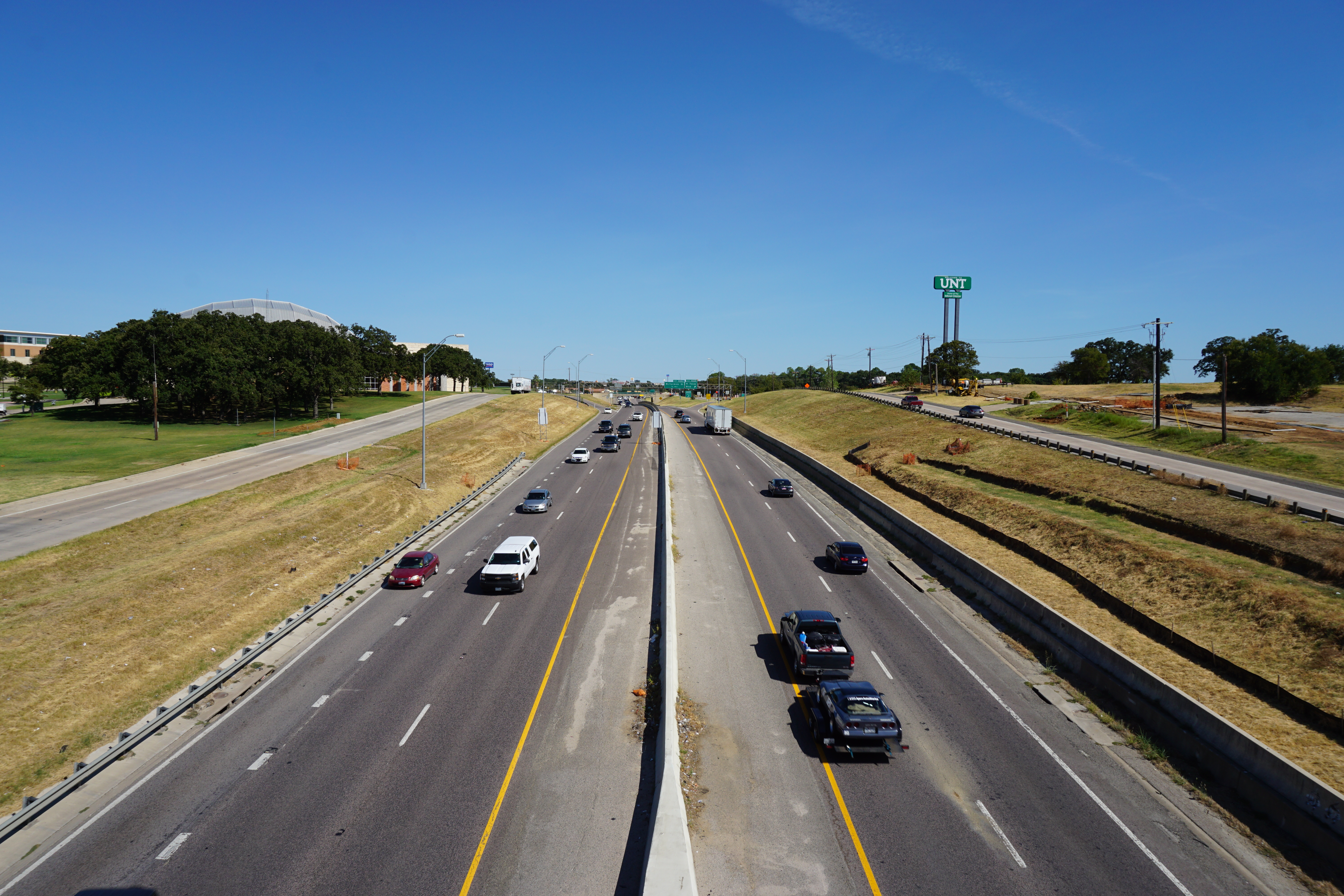
I-35E in Denton

== History ==
I-35E replaced most of US 77 between Hillsboro and Denton. US 77 is unsigned along the route, with the exception of the highway that runs through Waxahachie–Red Oak and Denton. I-35E was completed in the early 1960s.

When first designated, I-35W and I-35E were the only suffixed highways in Texas. Subsequently, I-69W, I-69E, and I-69C have been designated.

== Exit list ==
Exit numbers and mileposts increase numerically from the south end, continuing the numbers used on I-35.

County	Location	mi	km	Exit	Destinations	Notes
Hill		371.1	597.2		I-35 south – Waco	I-35E south and I-35W merge into I-35
Hill		371.3	597.5	370A	US 77 north / Spur 579 – Hillsboro	Southbound exit only
Hill		371.8	598.4	370B	I-35W north – Ft Worth	Southbound exit only
Hill	Carl's Corner	373.6	601.3	374	FM 2959 – Carl's Corner	
Hill		376.9	606.6	377	FM 934	
Ellis	Milford	380.7	612.7	381	FM 566 (Milford Road)	
Ellis	Milford	384.7	619.1	384	Derrs Chapel Road	
Ellis	Italy	386.2	621.5	386	SH 34 – Italy, Ennis	
Ellis	Forreston	390.8	628.9	391	FM 329 (Forreston Road)	
Ellis	Waxahachie	397.1	639.1	396	Spur 394 east	Proposed
Ellis	Waxahachie	397.7	640.0	397	US 77 – Waxahachie	
Ellis	Waxahachie	398.6	641.5	399	FM 66 to FM 876 / FM 1446	Signed as exits 399A (FM 66/FM 876) and 399B (FM 1446) southbound
Ellis	Waxahachie	400.4	644.4	401A	Brookside Road	
Ellis	Waxahachie	401.8	646.6	401B	Bus. US 287 to FM 664 – Waxahachie	
Ellis	Waxahachie	402.6	647.9	403	US 287 – Corsicana, Ft Worth	Access to Baylor Scott & White Medical Center-Waxahachie
Ellis	Waxahachie	404.3	650.7	404	FM 387 (Lofland Road)	
Ellis	Waxahachie	405.4	652.4	405	Lofland Road	
Ellis	Waxahachie	406.5	654.2	406	Sterrett Road	
Ellis	Red Oak	408.0	656.6	408	To SH 342 – Red Oak (NB); US 77 (SB)	South end of the overlap with US 77
Ellis	Red Oak	409.6	659.2	410A	Red Oak Road	
Ellis	Red Oak	410.6	660.8	410B	FM 664 (Ovilla Road)	
Dallas	Lancaster–Glenn Heights line	412.0	663.0	412	Bear Creek Road	
Dallas	Lancaster–DeSoto line	413.7	665.8	413	Parkerville Road	
Dallas	Lancaster–DeSoto line	414.2	666.6	414	FM 1382 (Belt Line Road)	
Dallas	Lancaster–DeSoto line	415.2	668.2	415	Pleasant Run Road	
Dallas	Lancaster–DeSoto line	416.1	669.6	416	Wintergreen Road	
Dallas	Lancaster–DeSoto– Dallas tripoint	417.1	671.3	417	Danieldale Road, Wheatland Road	
Dallas	Dallas	418.2	673.0	418	I-20 – Ft Worth, Shreveport	Signed as exits 418A (WEST) and 418B (EAST); Exits 467A-B (I-20)
Dallas	Dallas	419.8	675.6	419	Camp Wisdom Road	
Dallas	Dallas	420.5	676.7	420	Laureland Road	
Dallas	Dallas	421.2	677.9	421	Loop 12 / Ann Arbor Avenue	Signed as exits 421A (EAST) and 421B (WEST)
Dallas	Dallas	422.5	679.9	422A	Beckley Avenue / Overton Road	No direct southbound exit (signed at Kiest Boulevard)
Dallas	Dallas	422.8	680.4	422B	Kiest Boulevard	
Dallas	Dallas	423.5	681.6	423	US 67 south – Cleburne	South end of the overlap with US 67; southbound exit and northbound entrance
Dallas	Dallas	423.5	681.6	♦	US 67 south	Access for reversible HOV lane only; southbound exit and northbound right entrance
Dallas	Dallas	423.6	681.7	423B	Saner Avenue	No direct southbound entrance (signed via Kiest Boulevard)
Dallas	Dallas	424.0	682.4	424	Illinois Avenue	Access to Illinois Station
Dallas	Dallas	425.2	684.3	425A	Zang Boulevard / Beckley Avenue	Beckley Avenue not signed southbound
Dallas	Dallas	425.7	685.1	425B	Beckley Avenue / 12th Street	Southbound exit and northbound entrance
Dallas	Dallas	425.8	685.3	425C	Marsalis Avenue	
Dallas	Dallas	426.3	686.1	426A	Ewing Avenue	No direct northbound exit (signed at exit 425C)
Dallas	Dallas	426.6	686.5	426B	8th Street	
Dallas	Dallas	426.7	686.7	426C	Jefferson Boulevard	Southbound exit and northbound entrance
Dallas	Dallas	427.3	687.7	426C (NB) 427A (SB)	Colorado Boulevard	Access to Methodist Medical Center of Dallas
Dallas	Dallas	427.6	688.2	427C (NB) 428B (SB)	Riverfront Boulevard, Cadiz Street	
Dallas	Dallas	427.7	688.3	428A (SB) 427A (NB)	I-30 east / Griffin Street – Texarkana, Downtown	North end of the overlap with US 67; Exits 45A-46A (I-30)
Dallas	Dallas	427.9	688.6	428C	Reunion Boulevard, Commerce Street;	Signed as exit 428 northbound; Commerce Street is US 80 bus/former US 80
Dallas	Dallas	428.0	688.8	428B (SB) 427B (NB)	I-30 west – Ft Worth	Exits 45A-46A (I-30)
Dallas	Dallas	428.9	690.2	428 (NB) 429A (SB)	To I-45 / US 75 / Singleton Boulevard – Houston, McKinney	Access via Spur 366; no northbound access to Singleton Boulevard
Dallas	Dallas	429.0	690.4	429B	Continental Avenue, Commerce Street WEST	Commerce Street WEST not signed northbound
Dallas	Dallas	429.7	691.5	429C	Victory Avenue, Hi Line Drive	No direct southbound exit (signed at exit 430A)
Dallas	Dallas	429.9	691.9	429D	Dallas North Tollway	Northbound exit and southbound entrance
Dallas	Dallas	430.2	692.3	430A	Oak Lawn Avenue	Access to Texas State Highway 289
Dallas	Dallas	430.6	693.0	430B	Market Center Boulevard	Access to Market Center Station
Dallas	Dallas	430.6	693.0	430C	Wycliff Avenue	No direct northbound exit (signed at exit 430B)
Dallas	Dallas	431.3	694.1	431	Medical District Drive	Previously Motor Street
Dallas	Dallas	431.9	695.1	432A	Inwood Road	Access to UT Southwestern Medical Center, Parkland Memorial Hospital, and Children's Medical Center
Dallas	Dallas	432.8	696.5	432B	Commonwealth Drive	
Dallas	Dallas	433.4	697.5	433A	SH 183 to SH 114 – Irving, DFW Airport	Northbound exit and southbound entrance
Dallas	Dallas	433.3	697.3	433B	Mockingbird Lane – Dallas Love Field Airport	
Dallas	Dallas	434.1	698.6	434A	Empire Central	
Dallas	Dallas	434.8	699.7	434B	Regal Row	
Dallas	Dallas	435.5	700.9	435	Harry Hines Boulevard	Northbound exit and southbound entrance, access to Bachman Station
Dallas	Dallas	436.6	702.6	436A	Loop 12 / Spur 348 (Northwest Highway) – Irving, DFW Airport	Signed as exits 436A (SOUTH) and 436B (EAST) southbound
Dallas	Dallas	436.8	703.0	436B	I-35E Express to I-635 Express east	Northbound exit and southbound entrance; south end of Express Lanes
Dallas	Dallas	437.8	704.6	437	Mañana Road	Northbound exit only
Dallas	Dallas	438.1	705.1	—	Loop 12 south	Southbound exit and northbound entrance for Express lanes only
Dallas	Dallas	438.3	705.4	438	Walnut Hill Lane	Access to Walnut Hill/Denton Station
Dallas	Dallas	438.3	705.4	—	Walnut Hill Lane	Southbound exit and northbound entrance for Express lanes only
Dallas	Dallas	439.4	707.1	439	Royal Lane	Access to Royal Lane Station
Dallas	Dallas	439.9	708.0	440A	Forest Lane	Northbound exit only
Dallas	Dallas	440.1	708.3	440B	I-635 east / I-635 Express east	Includes free access from Express Lanes; Exits 27A-B-C (I-635)
Dallas	Dallas	440.1	708.3	440C	I-635 west – DFW Airport	Exits 27B-C (I-635)
Dallas	Farmers Branch	440.8	709.4	441	Valley View Lane	Access to Farmers Branch Station
Dallas	Farmers Branch	441.8	711.0	442	Valwood Parkway	
Dallas	Carrollton	442.9	712.8	443A	Crosby Road	No direct southbound exit (signed at exit 443B)
Dallas	Carrollton	443.1	713.1	443B	Belt Line Road	Access to Downtown Carrollton Station
Dallas	Carrollton	443.9	714.4	443C	Frontage Road	Former northbound exit only
Dallas	Carrollton	444.5	715.4	444	Whitlock Lane, Sandy Lake Road	Access to Trinity Mills Station
Dallas	Carrollton	445.4	716.8	445A	SH 190 / Dickerson Parkway	Southbound exit via exit 446
Dallas	Carrollton	445.5	717.0	445B	Pres. George Bush Turnpike	
Denton	Carrollton	445.9	717.6	446	Frankford Road	Access to North Carrollton/Frankford Station
Denton	Lewisville	447.4	720.0	447A	Sam Rayburn Tollway	
Denton	Lewisville	447.6	720.3	447B	SH 121	
Denton	Lewisville	448.2	721.3	448	FM 3040 (Round Grove Road) / Hebron Parkway	Access to Hebron Station
Denton	Lewisville	449.6	723.6	449	Corporate Drive	
Denton	Lewisville	450.5	725.0	450	Bus. SH 121	
Denton	Lewisville	451.5	726.6	451	Fox Avenue	
Denton	Lewisville	451.9	727.3	452	FM 1171 (Main Street)	Access to Medical City Lewisville
Denton	Lewisville	452.7	728.6	453	Valley Ridge Boulevard	
Denton	Lewisville	453.5	729.8	454A	FM 407 (Justin Road) / Lake Park Road	
Denton	Lewisville–Highland Village line	454.9	732.1	454B	Garden Ridge Boulevard	Access to Highland Village/Lewisville Lake Station; northbound entrance from Highland Village Road
Denton	Hickory Creek	457.2	735.8	457	Lake Dallas Drive	
Denton	Lake Dallas	457.5	736.3	—	I-35E Express	Southbound exit and northbound entrance; north end of the Express Lanes
Denton	Lake Dallas–Corinth line	457.7	736.6	458	FM 2181 / Swisher Road	Signed as exit 458A northbound; access to Lewisville Lake Toll Bridge
Denton	Corinth	458.4	737.7	458B	Quail Run Drive	Northbound exit and southbound entrance
Denton	Corinth	459.2	739.0	459	Frontage Road	
Denton	Corinth	460.3	740.8	460	Corinth Parkway	
Denton	Corinth	461.4	742.6	461	Post Oak Drive, Lakeview Boulevard	
Denton	Denton	462.6	744.5	462	FM 2499 (State School Road) / Mayhill Road, Bucee's Boulevard/Brinker Road	Access to Medical City Denton and MedPark Station
Denton	Denton	462.9	745.0	463	Loop 288 / Lillian Miller Parkway	Access to MedPark Station
Denton	Denton	464.6	747.7	464	US 77 north (Dallas Drive) – Denton	North end of the overlap with US 77; northbound exit and southbound entrance
Denton	Denton	464.9	748.2	464	Pennsylvania Drive	Former southbound exit only
Denton	Denton	465.1	748.5	465A	FM 2181 (Teasley Lane)	
Denton	Denton	465.7	749.5	465B	US 377 (Fort Worth Drive)	
Denton	Denton	466.6	750.9	466A	McCormick Street	
Denton	Denton	467.0	751.6	466B	North Texas Boulevard	
Denton	Denton	467.4	752.2	467	I-35W south / FM 1515 west (Bonnie Brae Street) / Airport Road – Fort Worth	Northbound exit and southbound entrance; Exit 85A (I-35W), access to Texas Health Presbyterian Hospital Denton
Denton	Denton	467.8	752.9		I-35 north – Oklahoma City	I-35E north and I-35W merge into I-35
1.000 mi = 1.609 km; 1.000 km = 0.621 mi: Closed/former; Concurrency terminus; Electronic toll collection; HOV only; Incomplete access; Route transition

== Auxiliary routes ==
- I-635, while technically a loop of I-35, only intersects I-35E and neither I-35 nor I-35W.
