= Texas State Highway Spur 408 =

Highway in Texas

State Highway Spur 408
- Patriot Parkway

Route information
- Maintained by TxDOT
- Length: 4.27 mi (6.87 km)
- Existed: 1965–present

Major junctions
- South end: I-20
- North end: Loop 12

Location
- Country: United States
- State: Texas
- Counties: Dallas

Highway system
- Highways in Texas; Interstate; US; State; Former; Toll; Loops; Spurs; FM/RM; Park; Rec
← Spur 407	→ Loop 409

Spur 408, officially designated as "Patriot Parkway", is a four-mile (6.4 km) connecting freeway between Loop 12 and Interstate 20, completely within the city of Dallas, Texas. The road is an integral part of the orbital road around Dallas, in conjunction with Interstate 635, and parts of Loop 12, Interstate 35E, and Interstate 20.

== Route description ==
The freeway passes through a generally undeveloped area of Dallas; there are no businesses located anywhere on the route that can provide services to motorists.

It is designated as "Patriot Parkway" since it passes along the eastern side of the Dallas-Fort Worth National Cemetery; however, it is locally referred to as Spur 408. Spur 408 also passes near Dallas Baptist University, whose athletic teams are known as the Patriots, and The Potters' House, the megachurch pastored by T.D. Jakes.

South of Interstate 20, Spur 408 ends and turns into Clark Road, a local thoroughfare. I-20 traffic can access Spur 408 but only traffic from eastbound I-20 can access Clark Road. Northbound Clark Road traffic accessing Spur 408 does not have direct access to I-20.

== History ==
Spur 408 was designated on March 31, 1965 on its current route. On December 12, 2007, the Dallas City Council and the Texas Department of Transportation entered an agreement to install lighting on Spur 408 at a cost of $2.5 million. TxDOT will cover the cost of construction, and the City of Dallas will cover the cost of maintenance and electricity. An increase in the number of cars using the highway daily, as well as the number of accidents were cited as reasons for the lighting.

== Exit list ==
The entire route is in Dallas, Dallas County.

All exits are unnumbered.

mi	km	Destinations	Notes
0.0	0.0	I-20 / Clark Road – Fort Worth, Dallas	I-20 exit 460; road continues south as Clark Road
1.2	1.9	Grady Niblo Road	
2.5	4.0	Spur 303 (Kiest Boulevard)	
4.3	6.9	Loop 12 / Illinois Avenue / Mountain Creek Parkway	
1.000 mi = 1.609 km; 1.000 km = 0.621 mi
