= Texas State Highway Loop 12 =

Highway in Texas

State Highway Loop 12

Route information
- Maintained by TxDOT
- Length: 47.742 mi (76.833 km)
- Existed: 1939–present

Major junctions
- Beltway around Dallas
- I-30; US 75; Dallas North Tollway; I-35E; SH 114; SH 183; US 67; SH 342; I-45; US 175

Location
- Country: United States
- State: Texas

Highway system
- Highways in Texas; Interstate; US; State; Former; Toll; Loops; Spurs; FM/RM; Park; Rec
← SH 12	→ RM 12

Loop 12 is a state highway that runs mostly within the city limits of Dallas, Texas. The western segment of the loop is named after General Walton Walker, who served and died in South Korea. During the 1950s and 1960s, Loop 12 was the outer beltway in the Dallas area, having since been supplanted by I-635, which is itself being supplanted by the President George Bush Turnpike. Loop 12 is, however, the only state highway in Dallas that forms a complete loop (Belt Line Road is also a complete loop but is not a state road except for a stretch as part of FM 1382).

== Route description ==
Starting in the east at I-30, Loop 12 goes north as Buckner Boulevard, following surface streets past White Rock Lake. Just north of White Rock Lake, it intersects Spur 244 and becomes Northwest Highway to the west; because there is an eastern and a western segment to this part of the road, at certain points the road signs read "East Northwest Highway". It continues west along surface streets over Central Expressway (US 75) and the Dallas North Tollway and moves north of Bachman Lake and Dallas Love Field.

After crossing I-35E, Loop 12 moves south as a freeway, locally known as Walton Walker Boulevard, passing where Texas Stadium once sat at the interchanges with SH 114 and SH 183. The segment between I-35E (Stemmons Freeway) and Spur 408 is the only portion of Loop 12 that is freeway. It is also the only portion that leaves the Dallas city limits, as it runs through the eastern portion of Irving between where the road crosses the Elm Fork of the Trinity River (northern boundary, just north of the former site of Texas Stadium) and where it crosses the West Fork of the Trinity River (southern boundary).

Between I-35E and SH 183, Loop 12 has two tolled express lanes, one in each direction. These lanes connect the express lanes on SH 183 to those on I-35E and I-635.

After intersecting I-30 for the second time, Loop 12 continues south, joining surface streets again east of Mountain Creek Lake at Mountain Creek Parkway and Patriot Parkway (or Spur 408, which provides a southwesterly freeway link to I-20). It continues to the southeast, turning east along Ledbetter Drive, just north of Dallas Executive Airport (formerly Red Bird Airport). It continues east, crossing US 67, I-35E for the second time, and I-45. At the intersection with US 175 and Murdock Road, Loop 12 turns north again as Buckner Boulevard all the way back to I-30. The portion between Bonnie View Rd. and US 175 is also known as Great Trinity Forest Way, as it passes across an undeveloped portion of the Trinity River and the Trinity River Audubon Center.

== History ==
Loop 12 was designated on September 26, 1939, from US 175 across US 80 to the Buckner Orphans Home, and across US 67 to SH 114 at White Rock Lake as a renumbering of SH 40 Bypass. On April 23, 1942, Loop 12 was extended from US 175 to US 75. On August 3, 1943, Loop 12 was extended westward and northward to SH 183. On October 6, 1943, Loop 12 was extended northward and eastward back to SH 114 at White Rock Lake. On January 7, 1971, Loop 12 was rerouted on Spur 348 and part of the old location of SH 114; the rest of the old location of SH 114 became new Spur 348, and the old route of Loop 12 became Spur 482.

== Major intersections ==
The entire route is in Dallas County.

Location	mi	km	Destinations	Notes
Dallas	0.0	0.0	South Polk Street	Interchange
Dallas	0.4	0.64	US 67 (Marvin D. Love Freeway)	Interchange
Dallas	3.0	4.8	Ledbetter Drive / Cockrell Hill Road	Interchange; access from Cockrell Hill Road to Loop 12 is via Exchange Service Road
Dallas	5.5	8.9	Spur 408 (Patriot Parkway) to I-20 / Illinois Avenue/Mountain Creek Parkway	Interchange; south (counterclockwise) end of the freeway; northbound access to Spur 408 is indirect via Illinois Avenue
Dallas	6.6	10.6	Keeneland Parkway	
Dallas	7.4	11.9	SH 180 (Davis Street) / Jefferson Boulevard	State Highway 180 known as Davis Street; SH 180 is former US 80
Dallas	8.6	13.8	I-30 – Dallas, Ft Worth	Exit 38 (I-30)
Dallas	9.0	14.5	Frontage Road	Southbound (counterclockwise) exit and northbound (clockwise) exit
Dallas	9.6	15.4	Singleton Boulevard	
Irving	11.1	17.9	Shady Grove Road	
Irving	11.6	18.7	SH 356 / Irving Boulevard	
Irving	12.7	20.4	Union Bower Road	
Irving	13.2	21.2	Grauwyler Road	
Irving	13.7	22.0	SH 183 – Ft Worth, Dallas	Airport Freeway; no southbound (counterclockwise) access to SH 183 east
Irving	14.3	23.0	SH 114 – DFW Airport, Grapevine	John W. Carpenter Freeway
Dallas	15.8	25.4	I-35E north	Exits 436A–B (I-35E); north (clockwise) end of the freeway
Dallas	15.8	25.4	Spur 348 west (Northwest Highway)	Eastern terminus of Spur 348
Dallas	16.2	26.1	I-35E	Exits 436A-B (I-35E)
Dallas	16.7– 17.0	26.9– 27.4	Spur 482 (Storey Lane) – Irving	Interchange
Dallas	16.7– 17.0	26.9– 27.4	Harry Hines Boulevard	Interchange
Dallas	18.7	30.1	Marsh Lane/Lemmon Avenue	Interchange
Dallas	21.3	34.3	Dallas North Tollway	
University Park–Dallas line	21.8	35.1	SH 289 north (Preston Road)	Southern terminus of SH 289
Dallas	23.7	38.1	US 75	Exit 5A (US 75)
Dallas	24.8	39.9	Skillman Street	Interchange
Dallas	27.0	43.5	Spur 244 east (Northwest Highway) – Garland	Western terminus of Spur 244
Dallas	27.1	43.6	East Lawther Drive	Interchange; southbound (clockwise) exit and northbound (counterclockwise) entrance
Dallas	27.5	44.3	Peavy Road/Mockingbird Lane	Interchange
Dallas	29.2	47.0	SH 78 (Garland Road)	
Dallas	30.6	49.2	Ferguson Road	Interchange
Dallas	32.0	51.5	To I-30 / US 80	Exit 53A (I-30); access via frontage roads
Dallas	34.0	54.7	Military Parkway	Interchange
Dallas	34.3	55.2	SH 352 (Scyene Road)	Interchange
Dallas	37.9	61.0	US 175	Interchange with C F Hawn Freeway
Dallas	41.5	66.8	Service Road	Interchange
Dallas	41.8	67.3	SH 310	Interchange with S M Wright Freeway
Dallas	42.2	67.9	I-45 – Houston, Dallas, McKinney	Exit 279 (I-45)
Dallas	44.6	71.8	SH 342 south (Lancaster Road) – Lancaster	Northern terminus of SH 342
Dallas	46.6	75.0	I-35E – Waxahachie, Dallas	Exit 421 (I-35E)
1.000 mi = 1.609 km; 1.000 km = 0.621 mi: Electronic toll collection; Incomplete access

== Gallery ==
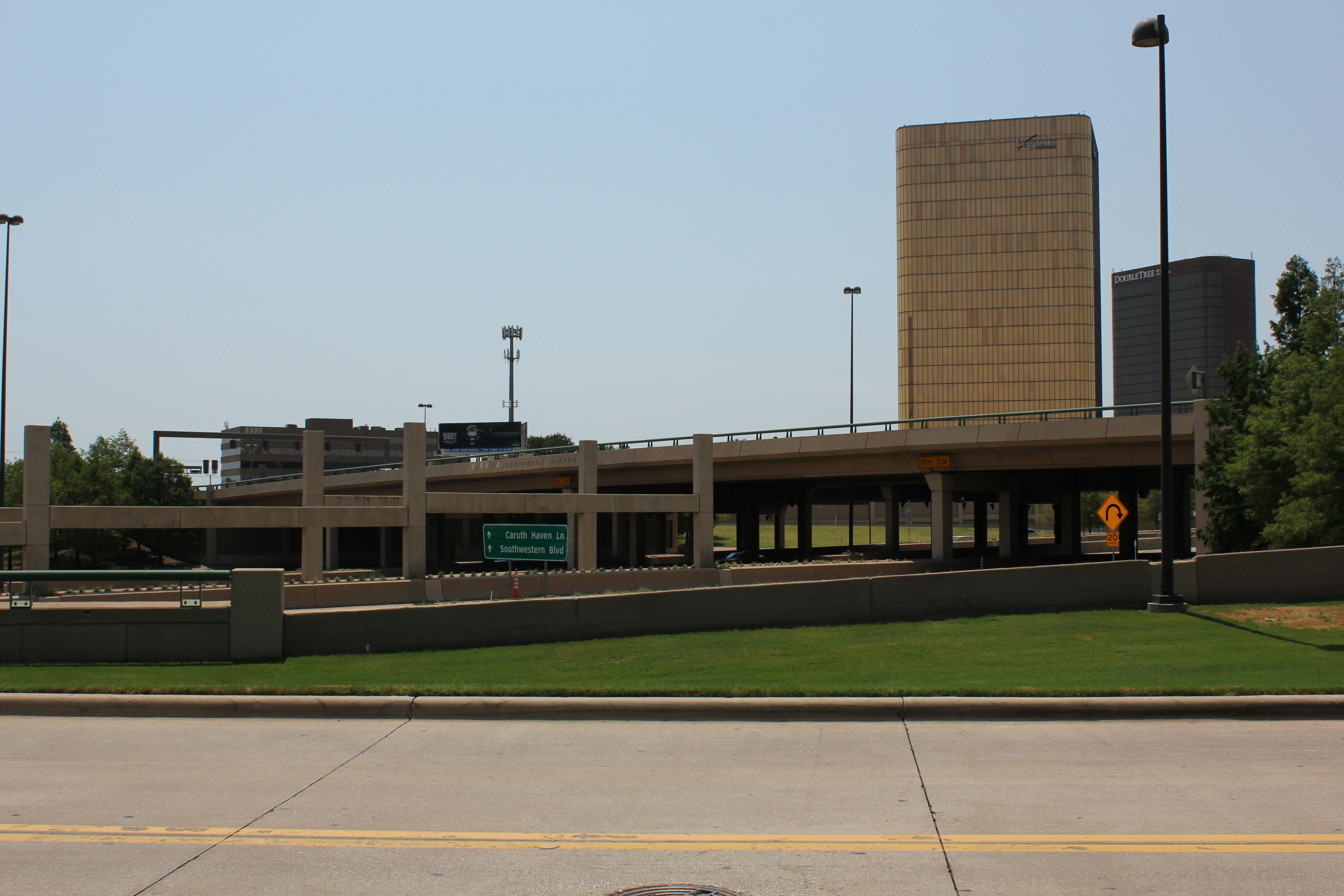
Intersection of Loop 12 with US 75

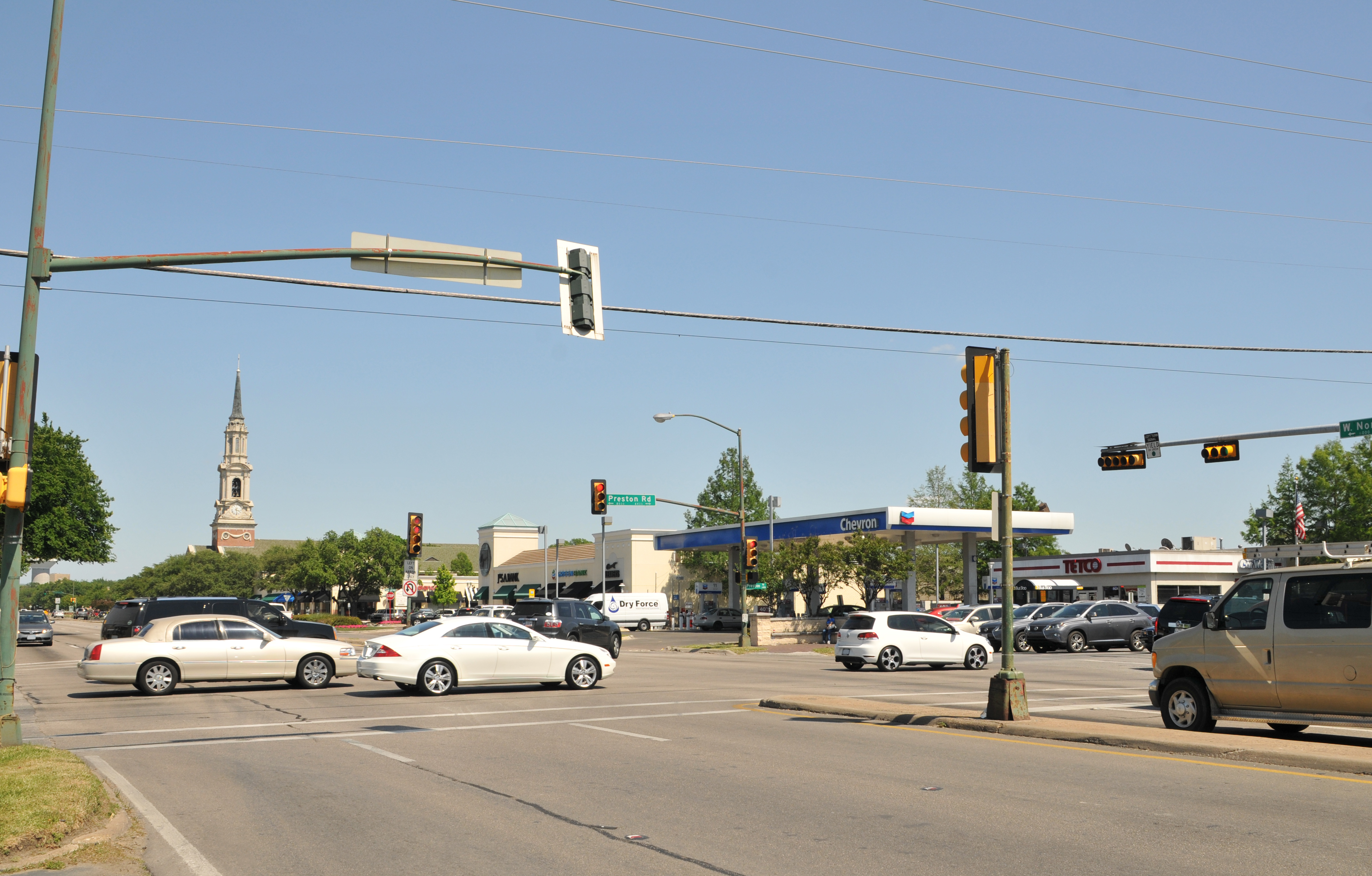
Texas State Highway 289 Preston Road intersection Loop 12 Northwest Highway

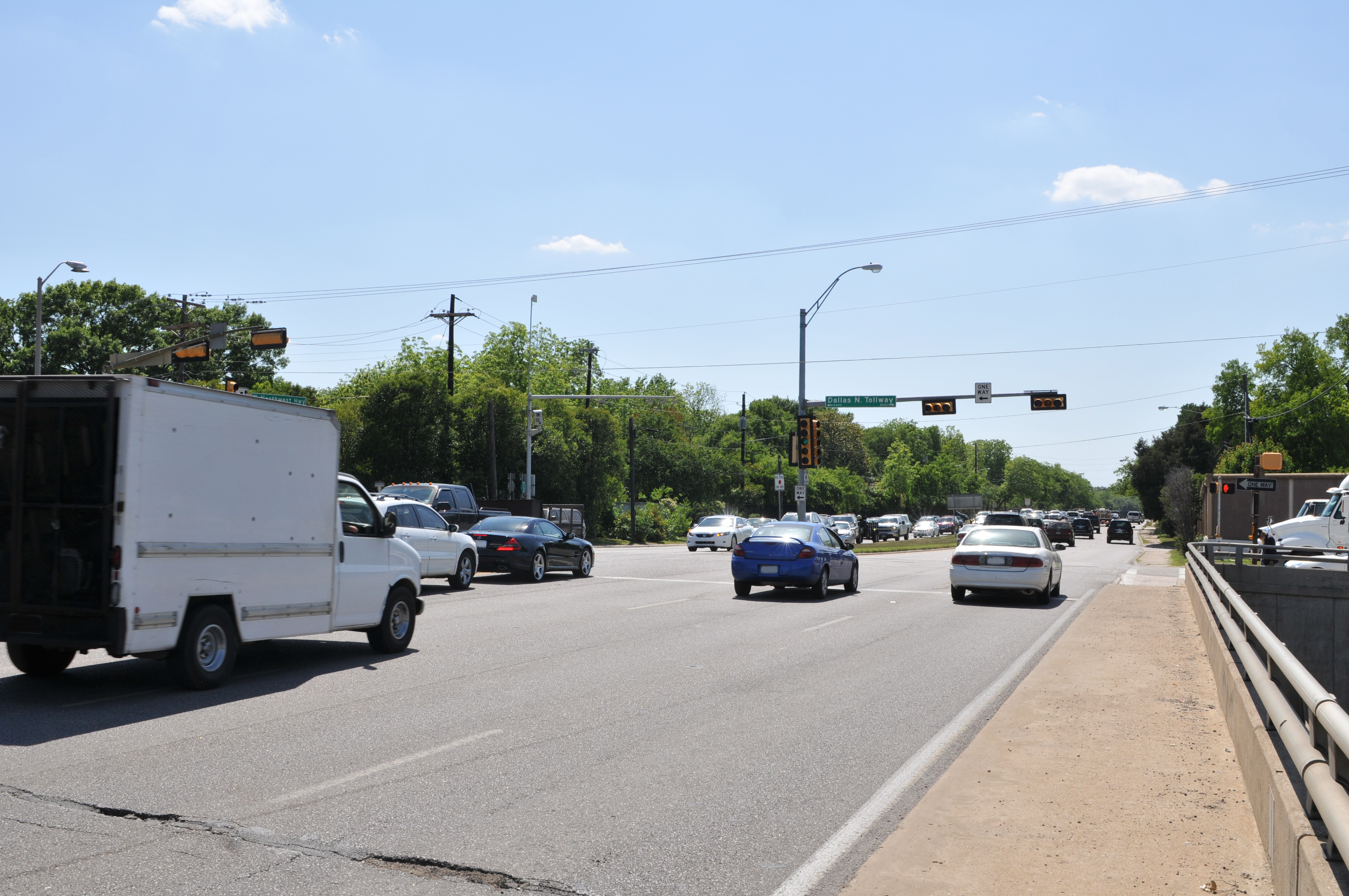
Loop 12 Northwest Highway at Dallas North Tollway toward Douglas Ave

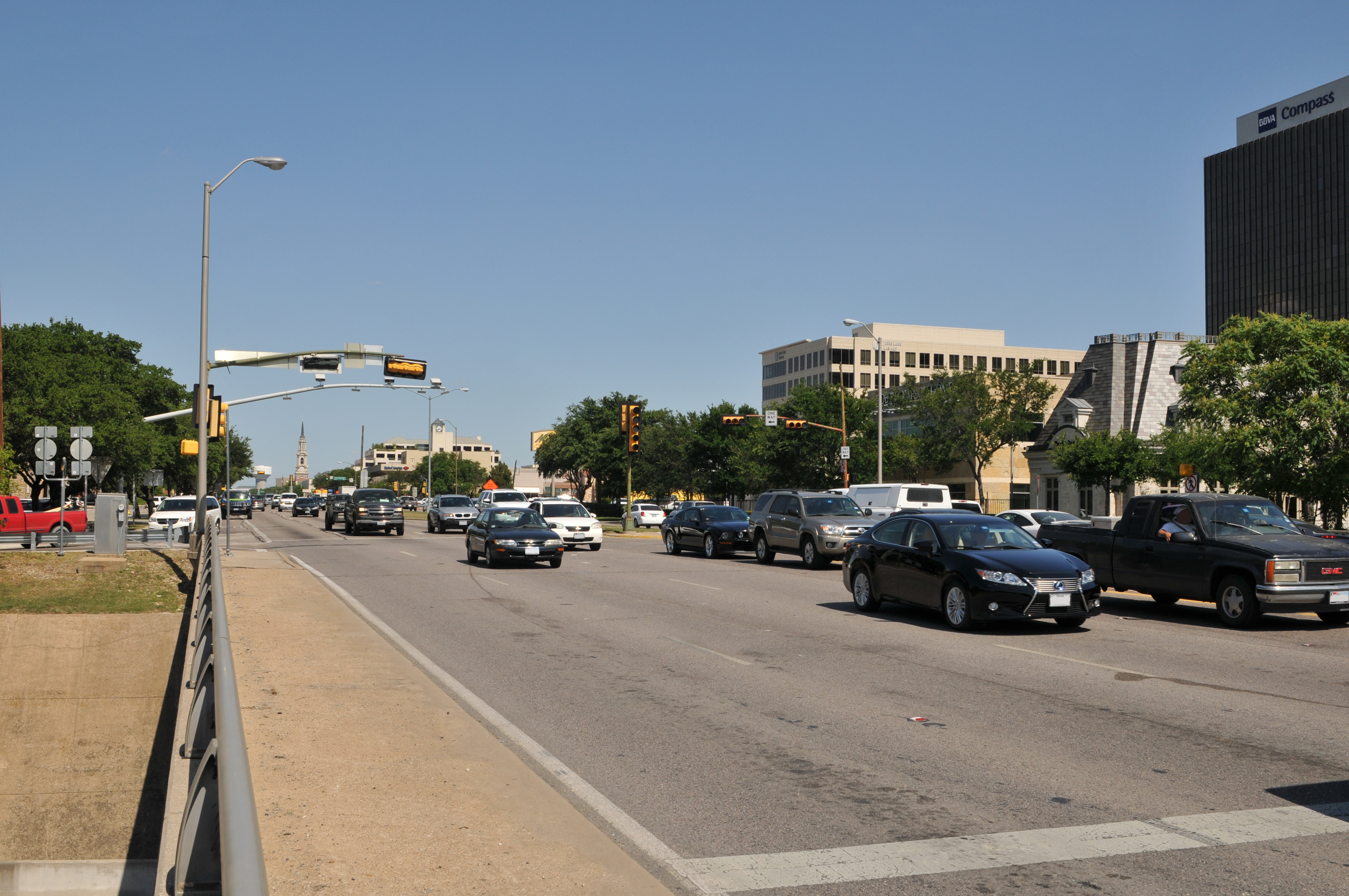
Loop 12 Northwest Highway at Dallas North Tollway toward Hathaway St
