= Northwest Highway (Texas) =

Route information
- Maintained by TxDOT
- Length: 42.7 mi (68.7 km)
- Existed: 1936–present
- Component highways: SH 114 (SH 170 to Spur 348; a segment in Grapevine runs along SH 114 Bus L); Spur 348 (SH 114 to Loop 12); Loop 12 (Spur 348 to Spur 244); Spur 244 (Loop 12 to SH 78)

Major junctions
- West end: SH 170 at Westlake-Trophy Club line
- SH 121 in Grapevine; President George Bush Turnpike in Irving; I-35E in Dallas; Dallas North Tollway in Dallas; US 75 in Dallas; I-635 at Dallas-Garland line I-30 in Mesquite
- East end: Belt Line Road in Mesquite

Location
- Country: United States
- State: Texas
- Counties: Denton, Tarrant, Dallas

Highway system
- Highways in Texas; Interstate; US; State; Former; Toll; Loops; Spurs; FM/RM; Park; Rec

Northwest Highway is a major highway/road in the Dallas-Fort Worth Metroplex area of Texas. The highway was originally built as the route of State Highway 114 (SH 114) into Dallas. The road has been the site of major development for almost half a decade, especially in Dallas. The route is known as other names at various points. This includes Northwest Parkway (SH 114 from SH 170 to the Dallas county line) and Northwest Drive in Mesquite.

== Route description ==
=== SH 114 and Bus. SH 114-L ===
Northwest Highway begins at SH 170 at the Westlake-Trophy Club line. Here, the highway is known as Northwest Parkway. The highway runs through Southlake and leaves SH 114 onto the Grapevine business route, Bus. SH 114-L. The Grapevine segment is the first to be signed as Northwest Highway. The highway has a short concurrency with SH 26 in the eastern part of town. Northwest rejoins SH 114 (which is concurrent with SH 121) near the north entrance of Dallas/Fort Worth International Airport. SH 121 leaves at the next exit towards Lewisville and onto the Sam Rayburn Tollway.

At the Dallas-Tarrant county line, the highway's name becomes the John W. Carpenter Freeway, into Irving. The highway crosses the President George Bush Turnpike and leaves 114 shortly after this. Northwest traverses onto Spur 348.

=== Spur 348, Loop 12 and Spur 244 ===
All 3.9 miles of Spur 348 runs along Northwest Highway from SH 114 to Loop 12. Spur 348 was designated on February 22, 1961, from Loop 12 to IH-35E. On January 1, 1971, Spur 348, as well as the old route of SH 114, became part of rerouted Loop 12, while Spur 348 was reassigned to the route from Loop 12 to SH 114 along the old location of SH 114. The old route of Loop 12 became Spur 482. Loop 12 joins Northwest Highway from the south just west of I-35E. The Loop 12 section is the busiest part of the highway. In the western part of the Loop 12 segment, Northwest runs along the north shore of Bachman Lake, which is just north of Love Field. After the Dallas North Tollway intersection, Northwest Highway runs past Preston Hollow (whose town hall was located on NW HWY before being annexed by Dallas in 1945) and then forms the northern border of University Park and interchanges with US 75 near Northpark Mall. Loop 12 leaves the highway to the south just northeast of White Rock Lake where the Spur 244 designation begins. Spur 244 ends at SH 78 (Garland Road) just short of I-635. All 2.9 miles of Spur 244 is signed as Northwest Highway. Spur 244 was designated on June 21, 1951 on its current route.

=== Garland Road to Belt Line Road ===
After passing under I-635, Northwest Highway enters Garland. The highway follows an east-west run to Centerville Road, where it turns to the southeast. After the La Prada Drive intersection, Northwest Highway enters Mesquite as Northwest Drive. The road changes directions again, back to an eastbound route, at I-30. The road travels for about another mile before ending at Belt Line Road.

== Junction list ==
NOTE: There are no mileposts along this highway.

County	Location	mi	km	Destinations	Notes
Denton	Westlake–Trophy Club line	0.0	0.0	SH 114 west / SH 170 west (Alliance Gateway Freeway) – Texas Motor Speedway, Alliance Airport	Western terminus; west end of freeway
Denton	Westlake–Trophy Club line	1.5	2.4	Westlake Parkway, Trophy Club Drive	
Denton	Westlake–Trophy Club line	1.9	3.1	FM 1938 (Davis Boulevard)	
Tarrant	Westlake–Southlake line	3.2	5.1	Kirkwood Boulevard, Solana Boulevard	
Tarrant	Southlake	4.1	6.6	Dove Road	
Tarrant	Southlake	5.7	9.2	White Chapel Boulevard	Westbound exit and eastbound entrance
Tarrant	Southlake	6.0	9.7	Carrol Avenue – Southlake Town Square	
Tarrant	Southlake	7.2	11.6	Kimball Avenue	
Tarrant	Southlake	7.8	12.6	SH 114 east / FM 1709 west (Southlake Boulevard)	East end of SH 114 overlap/freeway; east end of Bus. SH 114-L overlap
Tarrant	Grapevine	9.9	15.9	Main Street	Former Spur 103 south; decommissioned December 2006
Tarrant	Grapevine	10.7	17.2	SH 26 north – Gaylord Texan, Grapevine Mills	West end of SH 26 overlap
Tarrant	Grapevine	12.0	19.3	SH 26 south / SH 114 west / SH 121 south	East end of SH 26 overlap; west end of SH 114/121 overlap/freeway
Tarrant	Grapevine	12.9	20.8	SH 121 north to I-635 / International Parkway south – DFW Airport	East end of SH 121 overlap
Dallas	Irving	14.6	23.5	Freeport Parkway	
Dallas	Irving	15.5	24.9	Esters Boulevard	
Dallas	Irving	16.6	26.7	Belt Line Road	
Dallas	Irving	17.3	27.8	Pres. George Bush Turnpike	
Dallas	Irving	18.2	29.3	MacArthur Boulevard, Walnut Hill Lane, Love Drive	
Dallas	Irving	19.9	32.0	SH 114 east (John W. Carpenter Freeway)	East end of SH 114 overlap/freeway; west end of Spur 348 overlap
Dallas	Irving	20.1	32.3	Las Colinas Boulevard	Interchange
Dallas	Dallas	21.7	34.9	Luna Road	Interchange; eastbound entrance and westbound exit
Dallas	Dallas	22.2	35.7	Spangler Road	Interchange; westbound exit and eastbound entrance
Dallas	Dallas	22.9	36.9	Loop 12 south (Walton Walker Boulevard)	East end of Spur 348; west end of Loop 12 overlap
Dallas	Dallas	23.3	37.5	I-35E (Stemmons Freeway/US 77)	I-35E exits 436 A-B
Dallas	Dallas	23.9	38.5	Loop 354 north (Harry Hines Boulevard) / Spur 482 west (Storey Lane)	Interchange
Dallas	Dallas	28.5	45.9	Dallas North Tollway	
Dallas	Dallas	29.0	46.7	SH 289 north (Preston Road)	
Dallas	Dallas	30.8	49.6	US 75 (North Central Expressway)	Interchange; US 75 exit 5A
Dallas	Dallas	31.9	51.3	Skillman Street	Interchange
Dallas	Dallas	34.2	55.0	Loop 12 south (Buckner Boulevard) to I-30	East end of Loop 12 overlap; west end of Spur 244
Dallas	Dallas	37.1	59.7	SH 78 (Garland Road) – Garland, Dallas	East end of Spur 244
Dallas	Garland	37.6	60.5	I-635 (Lyndon B. Johnson Freeway)	I-635 exit 11B
Dallas	Mesquite	41.5	66.8	I-30 (US 67)	I-30 exit 58
Dallas	Mesquite	42.7	68.7	Belt Line Road	
1.000 mi = 1.609 km; 1.000 km = 0.621 mi: Concurrency terminus; Incomplete access
