= Texas State Highway 289 =

Highway in Texas

State Highway 289
- Preston Road
- SH 289; mainline in red, business route in blue

Route information
- Maintained by TxDOT
- Length: 70.879 mi (114.069 km)
- Existed: 1939–present

Major junctions
- South end: Loop 12 in Dallas
- I-635 in Dallas; Pres. George Bush Turnpike at Dallas/Plano line; Sam Rayburn Tollway / SH 121 at Plano/Frisco line; US 380 at Frisco/Prosper line; SH 56 at Southmayd; US 82 near Sherman
- North end: Elks Boulevard near Pottsboro

Location
- Country: United States
- State: Texas

Highway system
- Highways in Texas; Interstate; US; State; Former; Toll; Loops; Spurs; FM/RM; Park; Rec
← SH 288	→ US 290

State Highway 289, known for most of its length as Preston Road, is a north–south Texas state highway. It begins at the intersection of Preston Road and Loop 12/Northwest Highway in Dallas. The Preston Road designation comes from the fact that the highway generally follows the course of an older road known as the Preston Trail, which ran to the town of Preston Bend. Preston is now submerged by Lake Texoma. The road is known as Preston all the way north through the remainder of the Dallas-Fort Worth Metroplex to a junction with State Highway 56 west of Sherman, near the Oklahoma state line (except for the portion through Gunter, which is designated as 8th Street). Preston Road passes through many of the fast-growing northern Dallas suburbs, including Frisco and Plano, as well as Prosper and Celina, with many new housing developments being built along Preston.

== History ==
On September 26, 1939, this route was renumbered from part of SH 14. Prior to June 28, 1989, SH 289 began north of downtown Dallas in the Oak Lawn neighborhood at its intersection with Pearl Street. From there, the highway designation followed Cedar Springs Road northeast for less than a block, and upon an intersection with Maple Avenue, ran northwest up that street. Less than a mile later at an intersection with Oak Lawn Avenue, the highway designation turned northeast up Oak Lawn, which it followed into Highland Park. There, it was known as Oak Lawn Avenue until an intersection with Armstrong Parkway, where it became Preston Road. On October 30, 1958, SH 289 was extended northward 3.6 miles.

Preston Road is one of the most congested highways in the Dallas/Fort Worth Metroplex, but due to urban growth along the highway, room to add additional lanes is minimal, and no means exist to upgrade the road to freeway status without incurring significant cost to demolish businesses along the path. Instead, the nearby Dallas North Tollway generally parallels Preston Road. On June 28, 1989, the section of SH 289 from Loop 12 to a deleted section of Loop 354 was cancelled.

On November 19, 2009, an extension of SH 289 was completed from its previous terminus at SH 56 northward to a new connection with Farm to Market Road 120 near Pottsboro, Texas, another segment of the old Preston Trail, which ends on the south shore of Lake Texoma. (FM 120 north of the connection has been renamed as State Highway 289, except for a very small segment northeast of the intersection, which was renamed as Spur 316.) SH 289 officially ends at Elks Boulevard; the actual road continues for another 3–4 miles before ending at a local street in the Preston Bend community.

This provides another access route to North Texas Regional Airport, which has been proposed as a third airport for the DFW area. About US$63 million in bonds were sold by Grayson County. The Texas Department of Transportation has promised US$85 million in reimbursements for the bonds sold by the county.

== Business routes ==
SH 289 has one current and one former business routes.

=== Celina bypass ===
Business State Highway 289-C
- Location: Celina
- Existed: 1990–present

Business State Highway 289-C (Bus. SH 289-C), formerly Loop 483, is a business loop that runs on the former routing of SH 289 through Celina. The route was bypassed in 1969 by SH 289 and redesignated Loop 483. Loop 483 was redesignated as Business SH 289-C on June 21, 1990.

=== Prosper bypass ===
Business State Highway 289-D
- Location: Prosper
- Existed: 1990–2018

Business State Highway 289-D (Bus. SH 289-D), formerly Loop 439, was a business loop that runs on the former routing of SH 289 through Prosper. The route was bypassed in 1966 by SH 289 and redesignated Loop 439. Loop 439 was redesignated as Business SH 289-D on June 21, 1990. On May 28, 2009 the section from FM 1193 north to FM 1461 was returned to Prosper and Celina. On August 30, 2018, the remaining section from FM 1193 south to US 380 was returned to Prosper.

== Junction list ==
County	Location	mi	km	Destinations	Notes
Dallas	Dallas	0.0	0.0	Loop 12 (Northwest Highway)	Southern terminus; road continues as Preston Road
Dallas	Dallas	4.9	7.9	I-635 (Lyndon B. Johnson Freeway) / I-635 Express east	I-635 exit 21
Dallas	Dallas	6.1	9.8	Belt Line Road	
Dallas	Dallas	7.4	11.9	Keller Springs Road	Interchange
Collin	Dallas–Plano line	10.2	16.4	Pres. George Bush Turnpike / SH 190	
Collin	Plano	11.3	18.2	Park Boulevard	Formerly FM 544
Collin	Plano–Frisco line	16.0	25.7	Sam Rayburn Tollway / SH 121 – Lewisville, McKinney	Interchange
Collin	Frisco	19.9	32.0	Gary Burns Drive/Hutson Drive	Formerly Spur 33 (Gary Burns Drive)
Collin	Frisco	20.1	32.3	FM 3537 east / Main Street	Formerly FM 720
Collin	Frisco–Prosper line	24.5	39.4	US 380 / Bus. SH 289 north – Denton, McKinney, Prosper	Interchange; Bus. SH 289 is unsigned northbound
Collin	Prosper	26.1	42.0	FM 1193 west (Broadway Street)	
Collin	Prosper	28.0	45.1	Bus. SH 289 south / FM 1461 east – Prosper, McKinney	
Collin	Celina	31.0	49.9	Bus. SH 289 north – Celina	
Collin	Celina	32.3	52.0	FM 455 – Pilot Point, Weston	
Collin	Celina	35.5	57.1	Bus. SH 289 south – Celina	
Grayson	Gunter	41.1	66.1	FM 121 – Tioga, Van Alstyne	
Grayson	Dorchester	47.6	76.6	FM 902 – Collinsville, Howe	
Grayson	Southmayd	53.5	86.1	SH 56 – Whitesboro, Sherman	Interchange, former northern terminus
Grayson		56.8	91.4	US 82 – Gainesville, Sherman	Interchange; US 82 exit 636
Grayson	Pottsboro	64.0	103.0	FM 120 – Denison	
Grayson	Pottsboro	64.7	104.1	Spur 316 east	
Grayson	Pottsboro	66.7	107.3	FM 406 east – Eisenhower State Park	
Grayson		70.9	114.1	Elks Boulevard	Northern terminus; road continues as Preston Bend Road
1.000 mi = 1.609 km; 1.000 km = 0.621 mi: Electronic toll collection

== Gallery ==
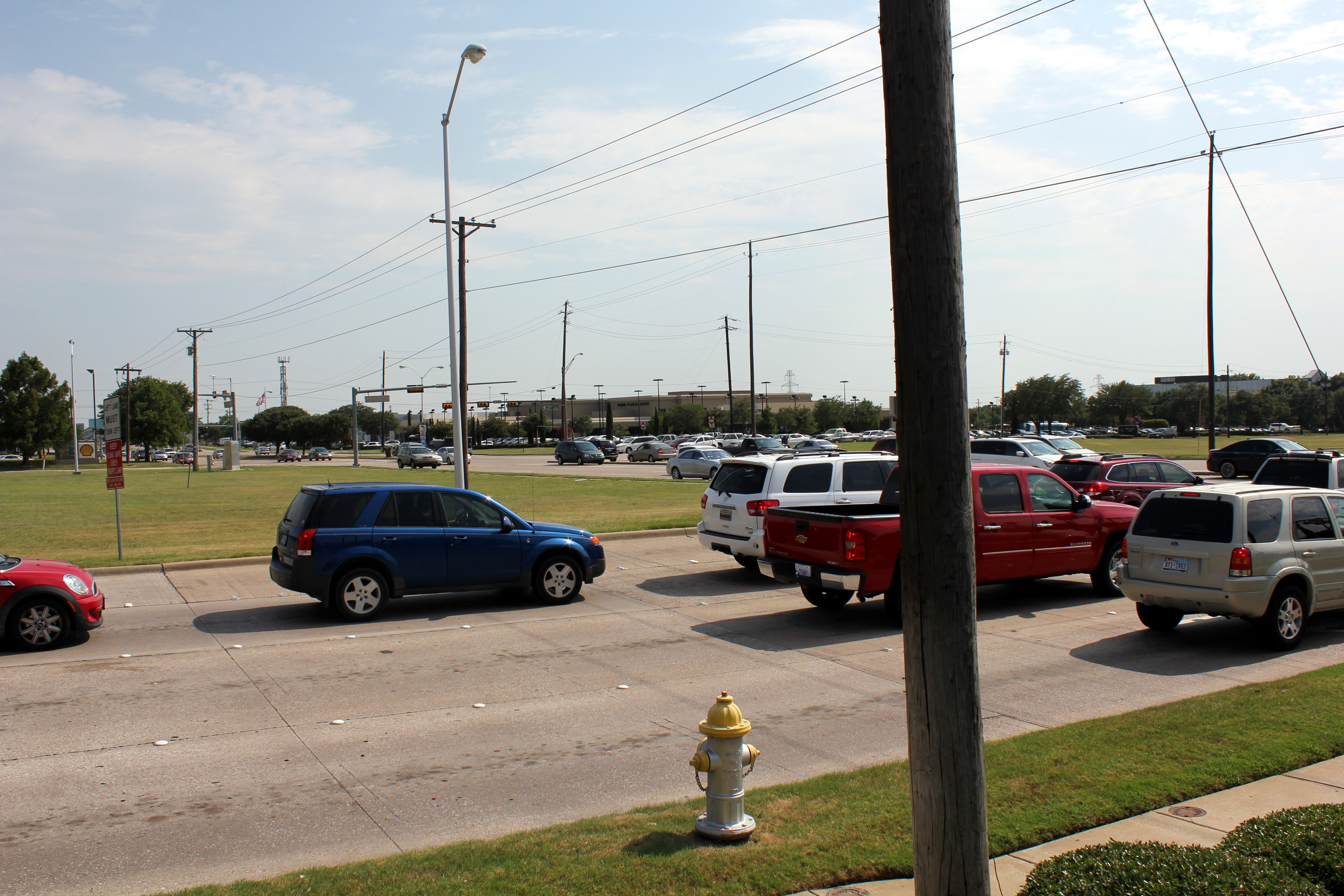
SH 289 at Plano Parkway in Plano

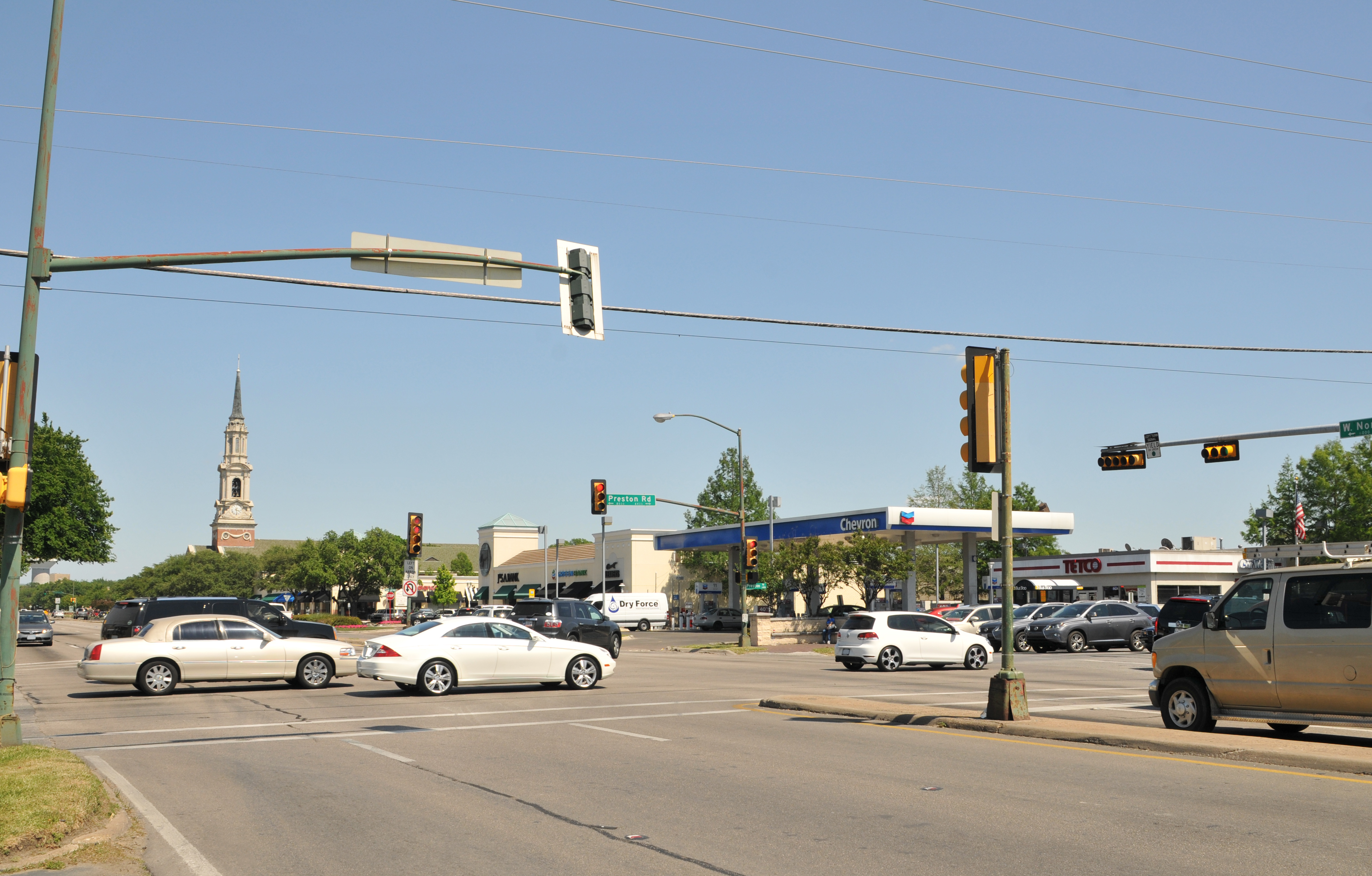
SH 289 (Preston Road) intersection at Loop 12 (Northwest Highway)

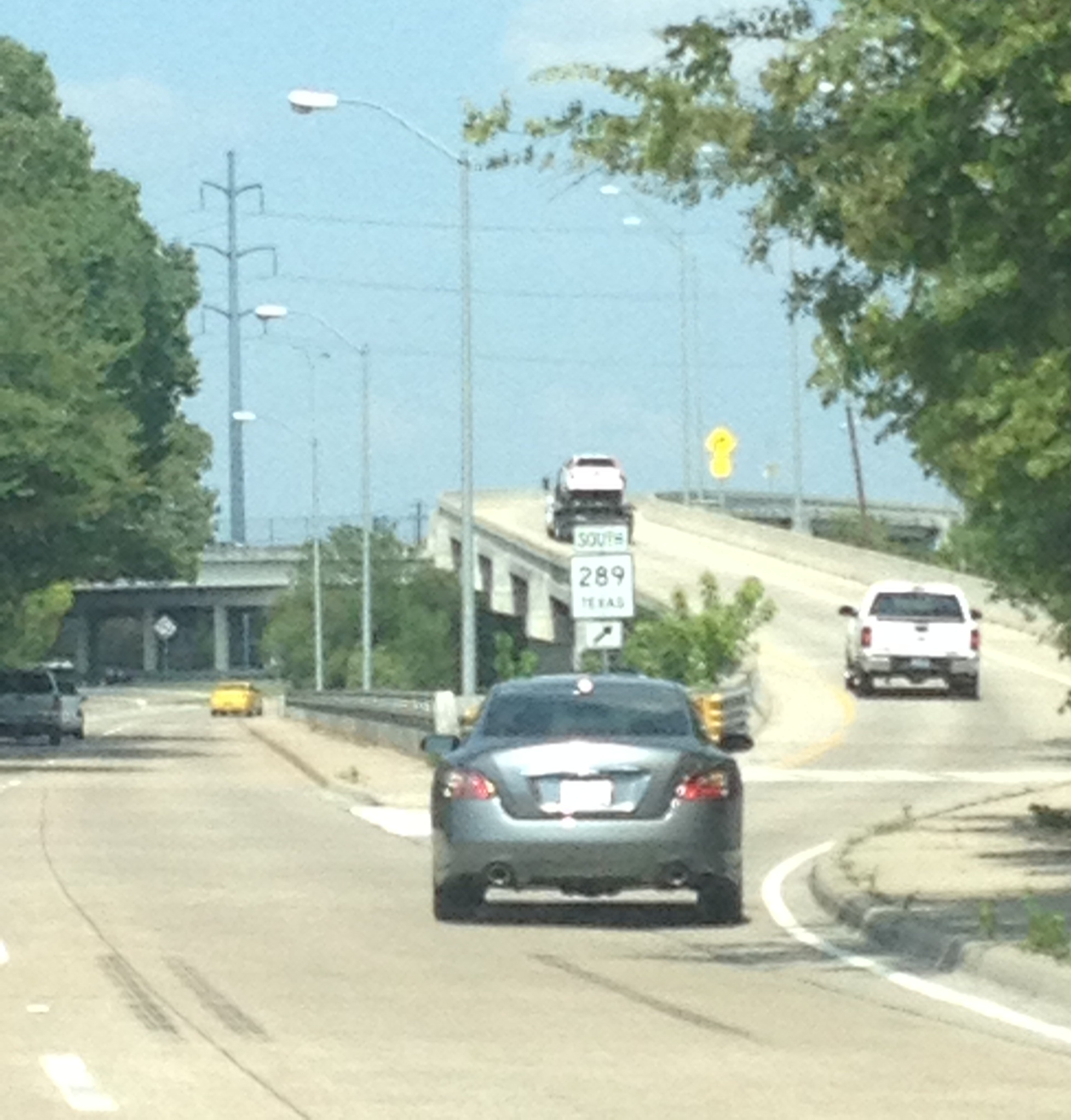
Driving on Keller Springs Road, showing the interchange at Preston Road in north Dallas.

== See also ==
- Preston Trail
- Preston Road Trophy
