= Texas State Highway 78 =

State highway in Texas

State Highway 78
- SH 78, mainline in red, business routes in blue

Route information
- Maintained by TxDOT
- Length: 90.83 mi (146.18 km)
- Existed: 1923–present

Major junctions
- South end: I-30 in Dallas
- I-635 in Garland; US 380 in Farmersville; US 69 in Leonard; US 82 in Bonham
- North end: SH-78 at the Oklahoma state line near Yuba, OK

Location
- Country: United States
- State: Texas

Highway system
- Highways in Texas; Interstate; US; State; Former; Toll; Loops; Spurs; FM/RM; Park; Rec
| ← SH 77 | → US 79 |

State Highway 78 (SH 78) is a state highway that follows surface roads in a predominantly southwest-to-northeast direction in the Dallas area before traveling 90 miles (145 km) north-northeast to the Oklahoma State border.

== Route description ==
The highway's southern terminus is at I-30 in Dallas near Fair Park. From there, it follows Grand Avenue to White Rock Lake and then Garland Road into Garland as it passes I-635. In Downtown Garland, Highway 78 follows the central streets of Avenues B and D before joining Lavon Drive and moving northeastward.

It continues to the northeast through Sachse and Wylie, crossing between Lake Ray Hubbard and Lake Lavon. It passes through Lavon before turning north through Farmersville and Blue Ridge. At SH 160, just before SH 121, SH 78 turns east, continuing to Leonard before turning northeast again to Bailey. At Bailey, SH 78 turns north and cuts through Bonham (as Center Street) to reach Sowell's Bluff Bridge (a 1938 truss bridge) over the Red River.

The route continues as Oklahoma State Highway 78 through Durant to its terminus at Tishomingo.

== History ==

The highway was originally designated on August 21, 1923, from Dallas to Bonham, replacing SH 5C. On May 19, 1924, the section from Desert to Bonham was cancelled. SH 78 was instead rerouted on its current route north of Desert to Bonham. On March 30, 1933, SH 78 was extended to Oklahoma. On October 6, 1943, SH 78 was extended south to Loop 12. On June 21, 1951, the section from US 67 to Loop 12 was renumbered to Spur 244. US 67 was rerouted over current I-30, and the old route was transferred to rerouted SH 78 and the rest northeast of SH 78 was renumbered to FM 7, which was cancelled and transferred to SH 66 on November 30, 1961.

SH 78A was a spur designated on May 9, 1927 from Desert to Bells. This spur was renumbered as SH 160 on March 19, 1930.

== Flooding ==
In 1990, SH 78 was flooded, as engineers at the Lake Lavon Dam decided to release the water from the lake into the East Fork of the Trinity River. For a month and a half, the traffic going between Wylie and the eastern portion of Collin County was diverted to go through the city of Rockwall, a nearly 20-mile (32 km) detour. The railroad that ran adjacent to the highway was completely washed out, and significant shoulder damage was done to the highway.

== Junctions ==
| County | Location | mi | km | Destinations | Notes |
|---|---|---|---|---|---|
| Dallas | Dallas | 0.0 | 0.0 | I-30 | Southern terminus; Exits 48B-49A (I-30) |
| Dallas | Dallas | 4.2 | 6.8 | Loop 12 (Buckner Boulevard) | |
| Dallas | Dallas | 7.0 | 11.3 | Spur 244 west (Northwest Highway) To I-635 east / Northwest Highway | |
| Dallas | Garland | 7.3 | 11.7 | I-635 west | Exit 12 (I-635) |
| Dallas | Garland | 11.4 | 18.3 | SH 66 east (Avenue D) | |
| Dallas | Garland | 14.3 | 23.0 | Pres. George Bush Turnpike | Interchange |
| Collin | Wylie | 20.3 | 32.7 | FM 544 west Kirby Street | |
| Collin | Wylie | 20.9 | 33.6 | FM 2514 west (Ballard Avenue) | |
| Collin | Wylie | 21.4 | 34.4 | FM 3412 west (Brown Street) | |
| Collin | Lavon | 26.0 | 41.8 | SH 205 south – Rockwall | |
| Collin | Lavon | 26.6 | 42.8 | Bus. SH 78-G north – Lavon | No southbound access |
| Collin | Lavon | 27.5 | 44.3 | Bus. SH 78-G south – Lavon | |
| Collin | | 28.6 | 46.0 | FM 6 east – Caddo Mills | |
| Collin | Copeville | 30.2 | 48.6 | Bus. SH 78-F north – Copeville | |
| Collin | Copeville | 32.4 | 52.1 | Bus. SH 78-F south – Copeville | |
| Collin | Farmersville | 37.4 | 60.2 | US 380 – McKinney, Greenville | Interchange |
| Collin | Farmersville | 38.0 | 61.2 | Bus. SH 78-E north | |
| Collin | | 39.4 | 63.4 | Bus. SH 78-E south – Farmersville | |
| Collin | | 41.5 | 66.8 | FM 2756 west | |
| Collin | | 46.8 | 75.3 | Bus. SH 78-D north – Blue Ridge | |
| Collin | Blue Ridge | 48.2 | 77.6 | FM 981 – Blue Ridge, Celeste | |
| Collin | | 49.1 | 79.0 | Bus. SH 78-D south – Blue Ridge | |
| Collin | | 53.1 | 85.5 | SH 160 north to SH 121 – Whitewright | |
| Fannin | | 56.2 | 90.4 | FM 815 north – Trenton | |
| Fannin | | 59.0 | 95.0 | FM 981 north | South end of the overlap with FM 981 |
| Fannin | | 59.2 | 95.3 | FM 981 south | North end of the overlap with FM 981 |
| Fannin | Leonard | 62.2 | 100.1 | FM 896 north | |
| Fannin | Leonard | 62.7 | 100.9 | US 69 south – Greenville | South end of the overlap with US 69 |
| Fannin | Leonard | 63.3 | 101.9 | US 69 north – Trenton | North end of the overlap with US 69 |
| Fannin | | 63.5 | 102.2 | FM 1553 north | |
| Fannin | Bailey | 68.5 | 110.2 | FM 816 south | |
| Fannin | Bailey | 68.6 | 110.4 | SH 11 – Whitewright, Wolfe City | |
| Fannin | | 69.5 | 111.8 | FM 1552 east | |
| Fannin | | 70.4 | 113.3 | FM 1553 south | |
| Fannin | | 71.1 | 114.4 | FM 68 east | |
| Fannin | | 76.8 | 123.6 | FM 1629 south | |
| Fannin | | 77.6 | 124.9 | FM 271 south – Bonham State Park | |
| Fannin | Bonham | 79.1 | 127.3 | SH 56 – Ector, Dodd City | |
| Fannin | Bonham | 79.4 | 127.8 | Loop 205 (10th Street) | |
| Fannin | Bonham | 81.0 | 130.4 | US 82 – Sherman, Paris | Exit 671 (US 82) |
| Fannin | Bonham | 81.9 | 131.8 | FM 898 north | |
| Fannin | | 82.8 | 133.3 | SH 121 south – Melissa, McKinney | |
| Fannin | | 85.9 | 138.2 | FM 1753 west | |
| Fannin | | 87.6 | 141.0 | FM 1396 east | |
| Fannin | | 90.0 | 144.8 | FM 274 west | |
| Fannin | | 91.4 | 147.1 | SH-78 north | Continuation into Oklahoma |
1.000 mi = 1.609 km; 1.000 km = 0.621 mi: Concurrency terminus; Incomplete access; Tolled

== Business routes ==
SH 78 has four business routes.

=== Blue Ridge business route ===
Business State Highway 78-D
- Location: Blue Ridge
- Length: 2.618 mi (4.213 km)
- Existed: 1990–present

Business State Highway 78-D (Bus. SH 78-D) is a 2.6-mile (4.2 km) long business route that runs through Blue Ridge in northern Texas.

=== Farmersville business route ===
Business State Highway 78-E
- Location: Farmersville
- Length: 2.435 mi (3.919 km)
- Existed: 1990–present

Business State Highway 78-E (Bus. SH 78-E) is a 2.4-mile (3.9 km) long business route that runs through Farmersville in northern Texas.

=== Copeville business route ===
Business State Highway 78-F
- Location: Copeville
- Length: 2.409 mi (3.877 km)
- Existed: 1990–present

Business State Highway 78-F (Bus. SH 78-F) is a 2.4-mile (3.9 km) long business route that runs through Copeville in northern Texas.

=== Lavon business route ===
Business State Highway 78-G
- Location: Lavon
- Length: 1.101 mi (1.772 km)
- Existed: 1990–present

Business State Highway 78-G (Bus. SH 78-G) is a 1.1-mile (1.8 km) long business route that runs through Lavon in northern Texas.
