= Harry Hines Boulevard =

Street in Texas, US

- Length: 10.4 mi (16.7 km)
- South end: Akard Street in Dallas
- Major junctions: Dallas North Tollway in Dallas; I-35E in Dallas; I-635 in Dallas
- North end: I-35E in Farmers Branch

Construction
- Inauguration: 1943

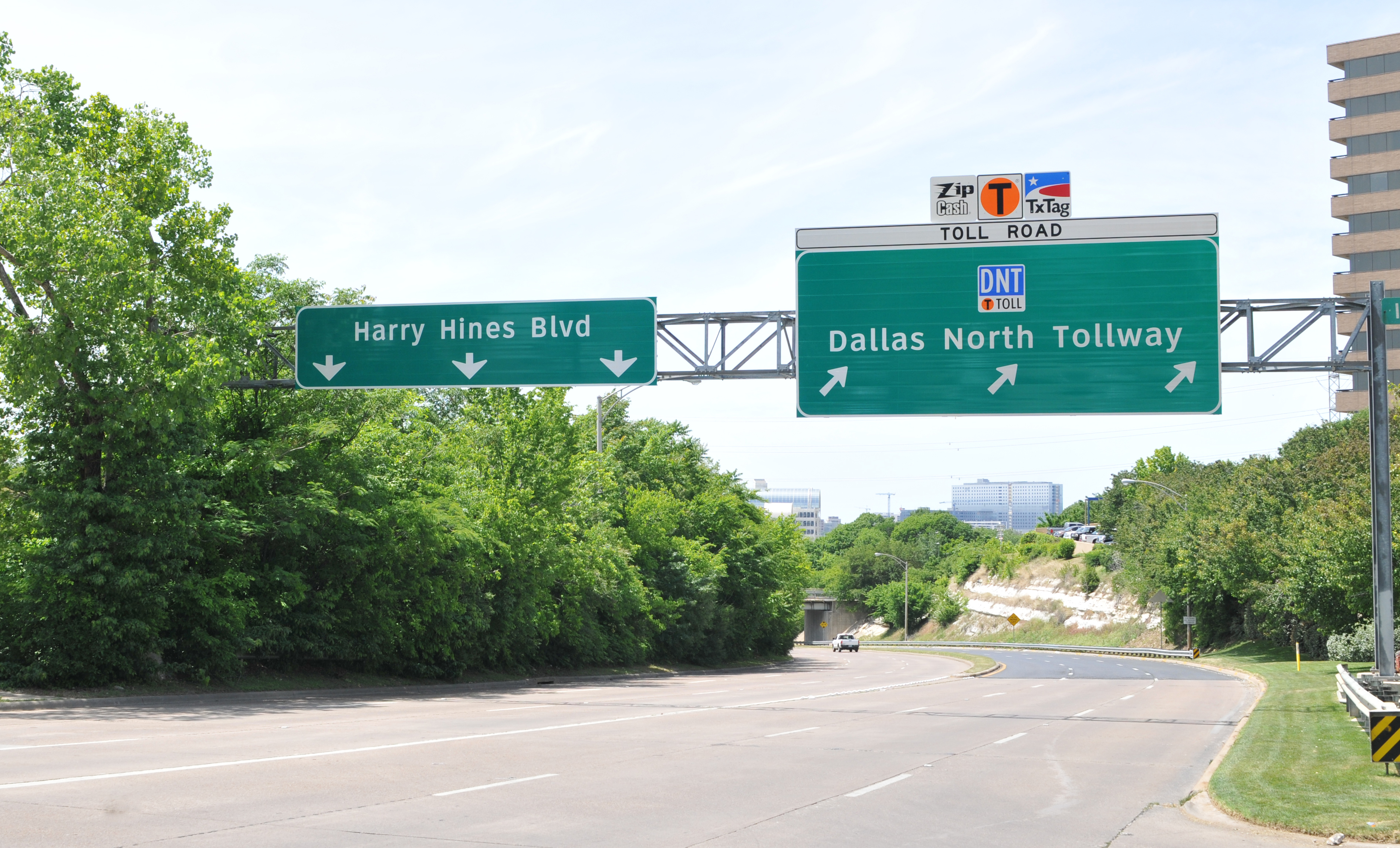
Harry Hines Blvd where Dallas North Tollway starts

Harry Hines Boulevard is a major street in Dallas, Texas, (USA), to the west of Uptown.

It was one of the first 'highways' in Texas, and is named for Harry Hines in honor of his work helping to get roads paved in this part of the state. Harry Hines served on the Texas Highway Commission from February 15, 1935, to April 11, 1941, and for the first two years as its chairman according to the records at the Texas Department of Transportation.

Harry Hines Boulevard forms the main part of the route taken by the Kennedy motorcade to Parkland Memorial Hospital immediately after the assassination shooting in November 1963. It is home to the University of Texas Southwestern Medical Center at Dallas. Today, the Harry Hines area is home to a wholesale district filled with wholesale warehouses.

Harry Hines is also well known for its Korean Cuisine, as the Asian Trade District is located along the street. Harry Hines Boulevard is also known for prostitution.

== Loop 354 ==
State Highway Loop 354
- Location: Dallas–Farmers Branch
- Length: 4.148 mi (6.676 km)
- Existed: September 19, 1961–March 29, 2018

Loop 354 was designated on September 19, 1961, from Interstate 35E (I-35E) to Saner Avenue and I-35E in Downtown Dallas. The highway traversed old sections of U.S. Route 67 (US 67), US 77, and US 80, and was signed as US 67 Business (US 67 Bus.), US 77 Bus., and US 80 Bus., according to which one it was the old route of. On June 25, 1991, the section of Loop 354 from Saner Avenue to Loop 12 was cancelled and removed from the state highway system, as that section of Loop 354, as well as Loop 260, were given to the city of Dallas. This section is now Harry Hines Boulevard, Cedar Springs Road, Field Street, Spur 366/Broom Street/McKinney Avenue, Lamar Street, Elm Street/Commerce Street, Houston Street/Market Street, Jefferson Street Viaduct, Marsalis Jefferson, and Zang Boulevard. The remainder of Loop 354 was given to the city of Dallas on March 29, 2018.

== Junction list ==
The entire route is in Dallas County.

Location	mi	km	Destinations	Notes
Dallas	0.0	0.0	Akard Street	
Dallas	0.4	0.64	Dallas North Tollway north	Interchange; southbound exit and northbound entrance
Dallas	0.8	1.3	Oak Lawn Avenue	Interchange
Dallas	2.6	4.2	Inwood Road – UT Southwestern Medical Center	Interchange
Dallas	3.3	5.3	Mockingbird Lane – Love Field	Interchange
Dallas	5.7	9.2	I-35E south	I-35E exit 435
Dallas	6.4	10.3	Loop 12 west (Northwest Highway) / Spur 482 (Storey Lane)	Interchange
Dallas	10.0	16.1	I-635 east (Lyndon B. Johnson Freeway)	I-635 exit 27C
Farmers Branch	10.4	16.7	I-35E (Stemmons Freeway, US 77) / I-635 west	I-35E exit 440C
1.000 mi = 1.609 km; 1.000 km = 0.621 mi: Concurrency terminus; Incomplete access

== See also ==
- Red-light district
