= Texas State Highway 342 =

Highway in Texas

State Highway 342
- SH 342, highlighted in red

Route information
- Maintained by TxDOT
- Length: 15.373 mi (24.740 km)
- Existed: 1941–present

Major junctions
- South end: US 77 in Red Oak
- I-20 in Dallas
- North end: Loop 12 in Dallas

Location
- Country: United States
- State: Texas

Highway system
- Highways in Texas; Interstate; US; State; Former; Toll; Loops; Spurs; FM/RM; Park; Rec
← SH 341	→ SH 343

State Highway 342 (SH 342) is a 15.373-mile (24.740 km) state highway in the U.S. state of Texas. The highway begins at a junction with U.S. Highway 77 (US 77) in Red Oak and heads north through Lancaster to a junction with Loop 12 (Loop 12) in Dallas.

== History ==
SH 342 was designated on November 24, 1941 over a former alignment of US 77 from the current alignment of US 77 in Red Oak to Spur 260 (Commerce Street) in Dallas, as US 77 was rerouted over SH 197. On June 25, 1991, the northern terminus was changed to I-30 with the removal of the portion north of I-30 from the State Highway System and returned to the city of Dallas. On August 25, 1992, the highway was further truncated to Loop 12. The section from I-30 to Corinth Street in Dallas was removed from the State Highway System and returned to the city of Dallas. The section from Downtown Dallas to Loop 12 was redesignated as a principal arterial street known as Lancaster Road, Corinth Street Road, Corinth Street Viaduct, then finally as Industrial Boulevard at its terminus.

== Route description ==
SH 342 begins at a junction with US 77 in Red Oak (just south of where US 77 intersects I-35E). It heads north from this junction to two other intersections in Red Oak, FM 2377 (locally known as Louise Ritter Boulevard) and FM 664 (locally known as Ovilla Road). Heading towards the north, the highway continues to an intersection with Interstate 20 in Dallas. SH 342 reaches its northern terminus at Loop 12 in Dallas.

== Major junctions ==
County	Location	mi	km	Destinations	Notes
Ellis	Red Oak	0.000	0.000	US 77 – Dallas, Waxahachie	Southern terminus
Ellis	Red Oak	1.7	2.7	FM 2377 south (Louise Ritter Boulevard) / Eagle Drive – Rockett	
Ellis	Red Oak	3.5	5.6	FM 664 (Ovilla Road) – Ovilla	
Dallas	Lancaster	7.8	12.6	Belt Line Road	
Dallas	Dallas	12.5	20.1	I-20 (Lyndon B. Johnson Freeway)	Exit 470 (I-20)
Dallas	Dallas	15.373	24.740	Loop 12 (Ledbetter Road)	Northern terminus
1.000 mi = 1.609 km; 1.000 km = 0.621 mi
