= Belt Line Road (Texas) =

Local road that loops around Dallas, Texas, USA

Route information
- Length: 93 mi (150 km)
- Component highways: FM 1382 from DeSoto to Grand Prairie

Major junctions
- Beltway around Dallas, Texas
- I-20 in Grand Prairie; I-30 in Grand Prairie SH 183 in Irving; I-635 in Coppell; Pres. George Bush Turnpike in Carrollton; I-35E in Carrollton; Dallas North Tollway in Addison US 75 in Richardson; I-30 in Garland; I-20 in Lawson; I-45 in Wilmer; I-35E in DeSoto

Location
- Country: United States
- State: Texas

Highway system
- Highways in Texas; Interstate; US; State; Former; Toll; Loops; Spurs; FM/RM; Park; Rec

Belt Line Road is a loop road that traverses 92 miles (148 km) through 16 cities in Dallas County, Texas. Belt Line Road is the outer complete loop which encircles Dallas, in contrast with I-635 which forms a partial inner loop, Loop 12 which forms a complete inner loop, and the President George Bush Turnpike, a partial outer loop.

Belt Line Road is not designated as a Texas State Loop, but as a local street in each jurisdiction through which it passes. One stretch of the road is designated as FM 1382 and is maintained by the state.

No portion of Belt Line Road is a controlled access freeway.

== Route description ==
In addition to entering the city limits of Dallas for multiple stretches of the road, Belt Line Road also travels through the municipalities of Cedar Hill, Grand Prairie, Irving, Coppell, Carrollton, Addison, Richardson, Garland, Mesquite, Sunnyvale, Balch Springs, Wilmer, Lancaster, and DeSoto.

=== Discontinuities ===
Belt Line Road is not a straightforward and continuous loop. As one follows the entire course of Belt Line Road, there are several discontinuities and name variations. Starting in the northwest corner of the loop road, the following deviations and turns are noted:

1. At Coppell, to follow Belt Line following the east-west portion of the road heading westbound, one must make a left turn at the 4-way intersection with Southwestern Boulevard and Denton Tap Road. Likewise, when proceeding to this intersection from the opposite direction (Southwestern Boulevard heading east), to follow the course of South Belt Line Road one must make a right turn or continue straight to head east on the east-west portion of the road.
2. In Richardson, a portion of Belt Line Road is named Main Street from North Central Expressway (US 75) to Bowser Road. After Bowser Road, Main Street becomes Belt Line again.
3. In Garland, Belt Line Road becomes 1st Street from Buckingham Road until the junction of First Street and Broadway Boulevard, where the course of Belt Line follows Broadway Boulevard. After crossing I-30 in south Garland, where Broadway becomes Belt Line again.
4. In central Mesquite, shortly after crossing US 80, a short segment of Belt Line is called "Bryan-Belt Line Road"
5. In south Mesquite, Belt Line Road makes a left turn at a T intersection with Lake June Road, where Belt Line proceeds southeast towards Balch Springs. Likewise, when proceeding to this T intersection from Balch Springs, to follow the course of Belt Line Road one must make a right turn.
6. From I-35E in DeSoto, Belt Line Road is also called FM 1382. However, in Cedar Hill, the name "Belt Line" is temporarily lost as FM 1382 starts to head northwest (the name instead follows the original routing of Belt Line Road, some of which was submerged with the creation of Joe Pool Lake). After passing west of Joe Wilson Road, follow the course of FM 1382.
7. At I-20 in Grand Prairie, the name "Belt Line" re-appears with FM 1382. FM 1382 is continued as part of Belt Line Road until it reaches SH 180-Main Street.
8. At Jefferson St/SH 180-Main Street in central Grand Prairie, until 2009 southbound Belt Line Road followed 8th Street while northbound Belt Line Road followed 9th Street through the middle of Grand Prairie. (9th Street was not originally part of Belt Line; it was added when 8th Street was made one way to alleviate congestion.) A new overpass was opened at this intersection to bypass the wait at the Union Pacific crossing and is a two-way street; however, 8th and 9th Streets remain a paired coupling to serve local businesses.

=== Farm to Market Road 1382 ===
Farm to Market Road 1382
- Location: DeSoto–Grand Prairie
- Length: 18.969 mi (30.528 km)
- Existed: 1949–present

FM 1382 is a Farm to Market road in Texas that runs from I-35E in DeSoto to SH 180 in Grand Prairie. Most of the highway is part of Belt Line Road, becoming its own route through Cedar Hill around Joe Pool Lake. FM 1382 was designated in 1949 from US 80 (now SH 180) southward 4.8 miles to a road intersection. In 1954, FM 1382 extended southeast 6 miles to a county road near Cedar Hill. In 1958, FM 1382 extended 1.7 miles to Belt Line Road in Cedar Hill. In 1972, FM 1382 extended east to I-35E, replacing FM 1381 which started in DeSoto 2.2 miles west of I-35E. In 1995, FM 1382 became an Urban Road.

== Major intersections ==
The entire route is in Dallas County.

Location	mi	km	Destinations	Notes
Cedar Hill	0.0	0.0	FM 1382 south / Penn Branch Parkway	Cedar Hill State Park; FM 1382 continues south
Grand Prairie	3.8	6.1	I-20	Exit 457 (I-20)
Grand Prairie	6.6	10.6	Spur 303 (Pioneer Parkway) / Mountain Creek Lake Bridge	
Grand Prairie	9.1	14.6	SH 180 (Main Street) / Jefferson Street	Grade-separated interchange; northern terminus of FM 1382; SH 180 is former US 80
Grand Prairie	10.0	16.1	I-30	Exit 34 (I-30)
Irving	15.4	24.8	SH 183 (Airport Freeway) / SH 356 east (Irving Boulevard) – Dallas, Ft Worth	Interchange with SH 183
Irving	18.3	29.5	Pres. George Bush Turnpike north / SH 161	Tolled northbound
Irving	20.2	32.5	SH 114	John W. Carpenter Freeway
Coppell–Irving line	21.4	34.4	I-635	Exit 33 (I-635)
Carrollton	27.3	43.9	Pres. George Bush Turnpike / Luna Road	Tolled turnpike in both directions
Carrollton	28.1	45.2	I-35E / US 77 – Dallas, Denton	Exit 443B (I-35E/US 77)
Dallas–Addison line	33.3	53.6	Dallas North Tollway	Via Dallas Parkway
Dallas	34.3	55.2	SH 289 (Preston Road)	
Richardson	38.5	62.0	US 75 (Central Expressway)	Exit 24 (US 75)
Garland	45.0	72.4	Crist Road	1st Street designation begins
Garland	46.5	74.8	SH 78 north (Lavon Drive) – Sachse, Wylie	Northern terminus of the concurrency with SH 78
Garland	46.7	75.2	SH 66 east (Avenue D) SH 78 south (Avenue B)	Southern terminus of the concurrency with SH 78; western terminus of SH 66
Garland	48.2	77.6	First Street south	Broadway Boulevard designation begins
Garland	52.2	84.0	I-30	Exit 59 (I-30)
Garland–Mesquite line	52.8	85.0	Broadway Boulevard designation ends	
Mesquite	55.6	89.5	US 80	
Mesquite	57.3	92.2	SH 352 west (Main Street)	One-way westbound
Mesquite	57.4	92.4	SH 352 east (Davis Street)	One-way eastbound
Dallas–Balch Springs line	62.1	99.9	I-20	Exit 482 (I-20)
Dallas	64.6	104.0	US 175 (C.F. Hawn Freeway)	
Wilmer	73.1	117.6	I-45 – Dallas, Ennis	Exit 270 I-45)
Lancaster	77.8	125.2	SH 342 (Dallas Avenue)	
DeSoto–Lancaster line	81.8	131.6	I-35E	Southern terminus of FM 1382; Exit 414 (I-35E)
Cedar Hill	88.4	142.3	FM 1382 north	FM 1382 continues north, fills gap of Belt Line Road route
Cedar Hill	89.1	143.4	US 67 (J. Elmer Weaver Freeway)	
Cedar Hill	92.2	148.4	Cedar Hill State Park	Road dead-ends
Gap in route, loop closed via FM 1382
1.000 mi = 1.609 km; 1.000 km = 0.621 mi: Concurrency terminus; Electronic toll collection; Route transition
