= Interstate 820 =

Highway in Texas

Interstate 820
- I-820 highlighted in red

Route information
- Auxiliary route of I-20
- Maintained by TxDOT
- Length: 35.173 mi (56.605 km)
- Existed: October 1, 1959–present
- NHS: Entire route

Major junctions
- West end: I-20 in Fort Worth
- I-30 in Fort Worth; I-35W / US 287 in Fort Worth; SH 121 / SH 183 in Hurst; US 287 in Fort Worth
- East end: I-20 in Fort Worth

Location
- Country: United States
- State: Texas
- Counties: Tarrant

Highway system
- Interstate Highway System; Main; Auxiliary; Suffixed; Business; Future; Highways in Texas; Interstate; US; State; Former; Toll; Loops; Spurs; FM/RM; Park; Rec
← I-635	→ SH 824

Interstate 820 (I-820 (Note: Some sources use "IH-820", as "IH" is an abbreviation used by TxDOT for Interstate Highways.)) is an auxiliary route of I-20 in Fort Worth, Texas, of approximately 35.173 miles (56.605 km) around the city and some of its suburbs. Exit numbers begin at its interchange with I-20 in southwest Fort Worth and continue in a clockwise direction around the city until it ends at its interchange with I-20 in southeast Fort Worth. A portion of I-820 in the northeast quadrant is cosigned with State Highway 121 (SH 121) as well as SH 183.

The northwest segment of the loop is officially designated as the Jim Wright Freeway after former U.S. House Speaker Jim Wright. The name, however, is not commonly used; the colloquial reference by the general public is "Loop 820", or simply just 820. Additionally, the area of the highway is given based on its direction from Downtown Fort Worth; for example, "North Loop 820" or "East Loop 820" respectively specify the areas to the north or east of downtown. These colloquial designations do not refer to the direction of traffic flow.

== Route description ==
I-820 begins in the southwestern Fort Worth at an interchange with I-20. It heads north from this interchange to a junction with Spur 580 before reaching I-30 at a stack interchange. Continuing to the north, the Interstate begins to turn to the northeast as it approaches Lake Worth. It passes near Naval Air Station Joint Reserve Base Fort Worth as it passes over Lake Worth. I-820 passes through the city of Lake Worth briefly with junctions at SH 199 and Farm to Market Road 1220 (FM 1220) before reentering Fort Worth city limits. Continuing to the northeast, a junction with Business U.S. Highway 287-P (Bus. US 287-P) provides access to Fort Worth Meacham International Airport. At an interchange with FM 156 in the city of Saginaw, I-820 begins to head toward the east. Continuing east, I-820 has a junction with I-35W at a stack interchange. The freeway enters the city limits of Haltom City at North Beach Street and has an interchange with US 377, before entering North Richland Hills. As it passes through North Richland Hills, the freeway turns toward the southeast briefly before turning back toward the east at SH 26. As it enters Hurst, the freeway has an interchange with concurrent SH 121 and SH 183. I-820 begins to head south after the interchange, now running concurrently with SH 121 and SH 183. At an interchange with SH 10, SH 183 leaves the concurrency to the west. At the next exit, SH 121 leaves I-820 toward the southwest. Continuing toward the south, I-820 leaves Hurst and reenters the Fort Worth city limits. Heading south through eastern Fort Worth, I-820 has a second junction with I-30, also at a stack interchange. After the interchange, the freeway continues south to a junction at SH 180 (Lancaster Avenue) and Spur 303 (Rosedale Street) near Lake Arlington. I-820 begins to follow the western shore of Lake Arlington to an interchange with US 287. I-820 and US 287 both continue to the south to an interchange with I-20 at the end of I-820.

== History ==
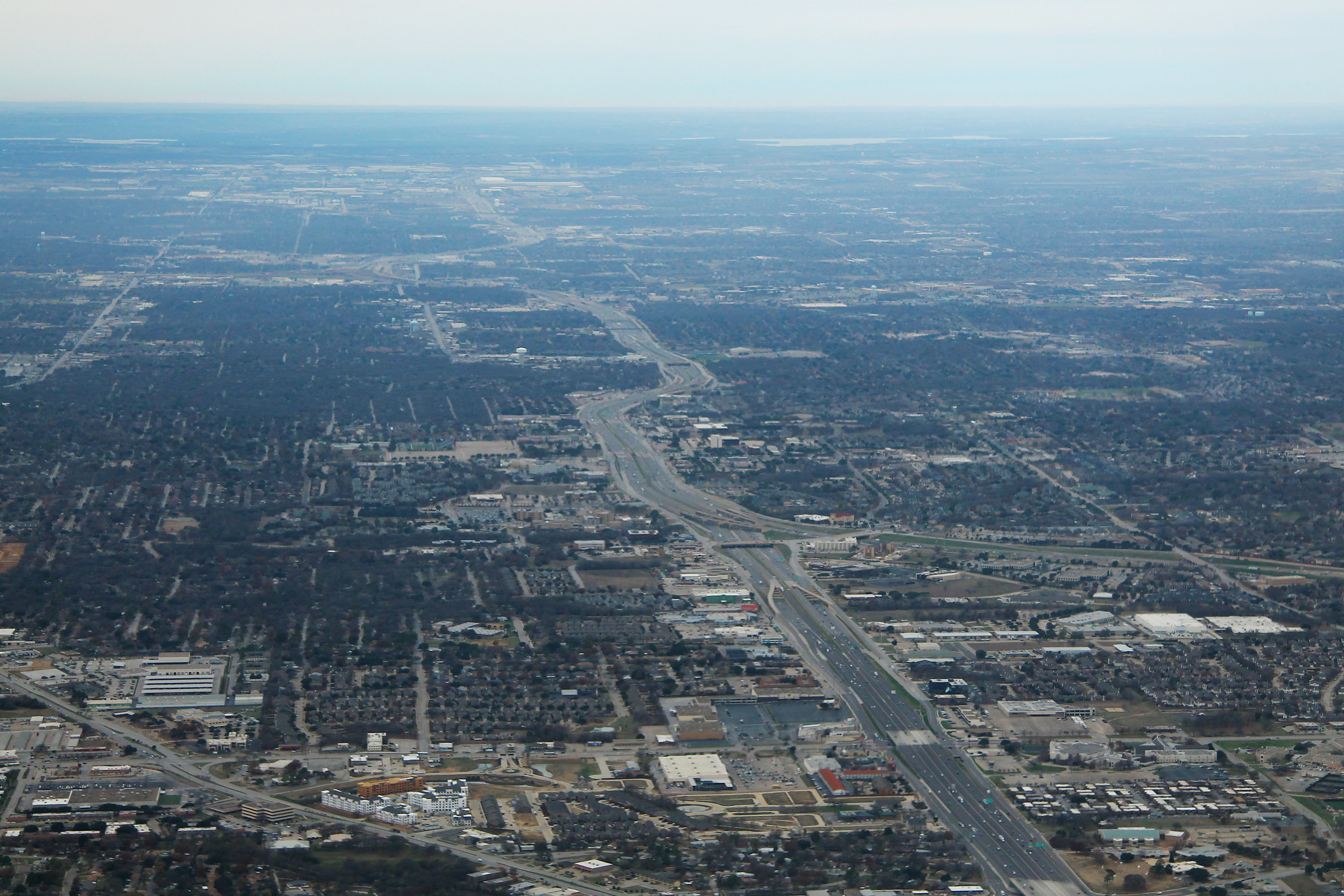
Texas highway Tx183 to I-820 facing west

The highway was first conceived in 1949 as a beltway around Fort Worth. It was originally designated from I-20 (now I-30) southeast, east, north, and west to I-35W. On April 18, 1963, I-820 was designated to use existing Loop 217 from SH 121 and SH 183 to Hulen Street while the section of Loop 217 from Hulen Street to US 377 was designated as Loop 820. On September 1, 1965, another section of Loop 820 from I-20 north and east to I-35W was designated. This section of Loop 820 from I-20 north and east to I-35W became part of I-820 on January 21, 1969, making I-820 a full loop. The first section to open ran from McCart Avenue to US 377 at a cost of $11 million (equivalent to $86.1 million in 2024). On May 13, 1977, the remainder of Loop 820 became part of an extension of SH 183. The southern leg of the loop was redesignated as I-20 on December 2, 1971, and finished construction in 1982, completing a continuous loop around Fort Worth. Despite no longer being officially designated as I-820 on the southern arc (which is officially part of I-20), it is still unofficially referred to as Loop 820 for business purposes, and the frontage roads and business addresses along the southern arc still bear the names "SW Loop 820" and "SE Loop 820".

Construction on the $2.2 billion Southeast Connector project began in late 2022. The project aims to reconstruct and widen 16 miles of I-20, I-820, and US 287 across Fort Worth, Arlington, and Forest Hill, expanding I-20 to 10 main lanes and I-820 to 8 main lanes while rebuilding key interchanges. Substantial completion is expected in early 2028.

The loop is often considered the most congested road in North Texas, with the interchanges at Rufe Snow Drive, Holiday Lane, and Denton Highway (US 377) being named the first, second, and third worst, respectively, in 2010.

=== North Tarrant Express ===
The North Tarrant Express (NTE) was a construction project that was supposed to add additional lanes, high-occupancy toll lanes, and continuous frontage roads and reconstruct the interchange with I-35W and various other interchanges between I-35W and SH 121/SH 183. This plan, however, was modified, with the additional mainlanes not being built, though the Texas Department of Transportation (TxDOT) plans to widen the freeway by no later than 2030. The NTE began construction in October 2010 and was completed in June 2015.

== Exit list ==
The entire route is in Tarrant County.

Location	mi	km	Exit	Destinations	Notes
Fort Worth	0.00	0.00		I-20 east – Dallas	Southern terminus
Fort Worth			0	I-20 west – Abilene	Southbound exit and northbound entrance; exit 428 on I-20
Fort Worth	0.83	1.34	1A	Team Ranch Road	Southbound exit and northbound entrance
Fort Worth	2.01	3.23	1B	Chapin Road	No direct southbound exit (signed at exit 2)
Fort Worth	2.45	3.94	2	Spur 580 (Camp Bowie West Boulevard)	Former US 80
Fort Worth	3.39	5.46	3A-B	I-30 – Weatherford, Downtown Fort Worth	Signed as exits 3A (west) and 3B (east); exits 5A-C on I-30
Fort Worth	3.79	6.10	3C	Westpoint Boulevard / Alemeda Street	Southbound exit and northbound entrance
Fort Worth	4.97	8.00	4	White Settlement Road	
Fort Worth	5.34	8.59	5A	Clifford Street	
Fort Worth	5.92	9.53	5B	Silver Creek Road	
Fort Worth	6.67	10.73	6	Las Vegas Trail / Heron Drive	
Fort Worth	7.35– 7.83	11.83– 12.60	Bridge over Lake Worth		
Fort Worth	7.95– 8.59	12.79– 13.82	8	Navajo Trail / Cahoba Drive	
Fort Worth	9.53	15.34	9	Quebec Street	No direct westbound exit (signed at exit 10A)
Fort Worth–Lake Worth line	10.09	16.24	10	SH 199 (Jacksboro Highway)	
Lake Worth	10.57	17.01	11	FM 1220 (Azle Avenue)	No direct eastbound exit (signed at exit 10A)
Fort Worth	12.41– 12.81	19.97– 20.62	12	Marine Creek Parkway / Old Decatur Road	Signed as exits 12A (Marine Creek) and 12B (Old Decatur) westbound
Fort Worth	13.88	22.34	14 (EB) 14A (WB)	Bus. US 287 (Main Street) – Saginaw	
Fort Worth	14.19	22.84	14B	Railhead Road	Westbound exit and eastbound entrance
Saginaw–Fort Worth line	15.12	24.33	15	FM 156 (Blue Mound Road)	
Fort Worth	16.42	26.43	16A	Mark IV Parkway	
Fort Worth	16.91	27.21	16B	I-35W / I-35W Express / US 287 – Fort Worth, Denton	Exit 57 on I-35W
Fort Worth	16.91	27.21		I-820 Express east to SH 26 / SH 121 / SH 183 – DFW Airport, Dallas	Eastbound exit and westbound entrance
Fort Worth	17.63	28.37	17	Riverside Drive / Beach Street	Access to Mercantile Center station
Haltom City	18.20– 19.00	29.29– 30.58	18	Haltom Road / North Beach Street	Access to Mercantile Center station
Haltom City	19.73	31.75	19	US 377 (Denton Highway)	No direct eastbound exit (signed at exit 18)
North Richland Hills	20.48	32.96	20A	Iron Horse Boulevard / Meadow Lakes Drive	Westbound exit and eastbound entrance; access to North Richland Hills/Iron Horse station
North Richland Hills	20.48	32.96		I-820 Express west to I-35W	Westbound exit and eastbound entrance
North Richland Hills	21.21	34.13	20B	Rufe Snow Drive	Signed as exit 20 eastbound; access to North Richland Hills/Iron Horse station
North Richland Hills	21.85	35.16	21	Holiday Lane	No direct eastbound exit (signed at exit 20)
North Richland Hills	22.67	36.48	22A (SB); 22B (NB)	SH 26 / FM 1938 north / Bedford-Euless Road – Colleyville, TCC Northeast Campus	Access to North Hills Hospital
Hurst	23.21– 23.45	37.35– 37.74	22B (SB); 22A (NB)	SH 121 north / SH 183 east – DFW Airport, Dallas	Northern end of SH 121/SH 183 concurrency
Hurst	23.21– 23.45	37.35– 37.74	23A	SH 121 Express north / SH 183 Express east to FM 157	Northbound exit and southbound entrance
Hurst	23.77	38.25	23B	Pipeline Road / Glenview Drive	Access to North Hills Hospital; signed as 23B northbound
Hurst	24.84	39.98	24	SH 10 east / SH 183 west	Southern end of SH 183 concurrency
Hurst	25.04	40.30	25A	SH 121 south – Downtown Fort Worth	Southern end of SH 121 concurrency
Fort Worth	25.63	41.25	25B	Trinity Boulevard	
Fort Worth	26.98	43.42	26	Randol Mill Road	
Fort Worth	27.81	44.76	27	John T. White Road / Bridge Street	
Fort Worth	28.27	45.50	28A	I-30 – Dallas, Downtown Fort Worth	Signed as exits 28A (east) and 28B (west) southbound; exits 21A-C on I-30
Fort Worth	28.65	46.11	28B (NB); 28C (SB)	Brentwood Stair Road	
Fort Worth	29.33	47.20	29	Meadowbrook Drive	
Fort Worth	29.94	48.18	30A	Craig Street	No direct northbound exit (signed with SH 180)
Fort Worth	30.14	48.51	30A (NB); 30B (SB)	SH 180 (Lancaster Avenue)	Former US 80
Fort Worth	30.50	49.08	30B	Spur 303 (Rosedale Street)	No direct southbound exit (signed with SH 180)
Fort Worth	31.13	50.10	30C	Ramey Avenue	
Fort Worth	32.07	51.61	31	East Berry Street	
Fort Worth	32.87	52.90	32	Wilbarger Street	No direct northbound exit (signed at exit 33B); no southbound entrance
Fort Worth	33.28– 33.37	53.56– 53.70	33A	US 287 north – Downtown Fort Worth	Northern end of US 287 concurrency
Fort Worth	33.50	53.91	33B	Martin Street / Wilbarger Street	No southbound exit
Fort Worth	34.19	55.02	33C	Sun Valley Drive	
Fort Worth			34	I-20 east / US 287 south – Waxahachie, Dallas	Southbound left exit and northbound entrance; southern end of US 287 concurrency; exit 442B on I-20
Fort Worth	34.91	56.18	–	I-20 west – Abilene	Eastern terminus
1.000 mi = 1.609 km; 1.000 km = 0.621 mi: Concurrency terminus; Incomplete access
