= U.S. Route 287 Business (Mansfield–Fort Worth, Texas) =

Business route in Texas

Business U.S. Highway 287

Route information
- Maintained by Texas Department of Transportation
- Length: 38.613 mi (Note: .The certified mileage given is shorter than the actual mileage as TxDOT considers US 287 BUS P to be discontinuous at rather than concurrent with I-35W.) (62.142 km)
- Existed: January 14, 1991–present

Major junctions
- South end: US 287 / FM 157 in Mansfield
- I-20 / I-820 at Kennedale–Fort Worth line I-35W in Fort Worth I-820 in Fort Worth
- North end: US 81 / US 287 / FM 718 in Avondale

Location
- Country: United States
- State: Texas
- Counties: Tarrant

Highway system
- United States Numbered Highway System; List; Special; Divided; Highways in Texas; Interstate; US; State; Former; Toll; Loops; Spurs; FM/RM; Park; Rec

Business US Highway 287-P (BU 287-P) is a 38.613-mile-long (62.142 km) business loop of US Highway 287 in the state of Texas that serves as main street for Mansfield, downtown Fort Worth and Saginaw. The highway is known as Main Street while in Mansfield, Mansfield Highway while in southern Fort Worth, Kennedale Parkway in Kennedale, Riverside Drive and Rosedale Street in central Fort Worth, Commerce Street in downtown Fort Worth, Main Street in northern Fort Worth, and Saginaw Boulevard in Saginaw. The highway was originally designated on January 14, 1991, to replace a portion of Loop 496, and the old route of US 287 and US 81. The route was then rerouted several times during the 1990s and 2010s. Bus. US 287-P is located entirely in Tarrant County, and is mostly located in Fort Worth. The highway is, as of 2010, the longest business route of US 287, while located in Texas. (Note: See Business routes of U.S. Route 287 in Texas.)

== Route description ==
BU 287-P begins its thirty-eight and a half mile length on Main Street in the city of Mansfield, Texas by running concurrent with it as an undivided, two-lane roadway. It moves northwest and splits off westward [from FM 157, immediately curving to continue its northwesterly route. A bit over a mile later it crosses FM 1187 at a signaled intersection. North Main ends two miles later and US 287 Business begins its concurrency with the Mansfield Highway and continues in a straight, northwesterly course. After just over a mile, Mansfield Highway itself ends and US 287 Business begins to run concurrent with the Kennedale Parkway, still on its unwavering, northwesterly course. A quarter-mile later, at Eden Road, the highway widens into a four-lane undivided roadway. Just over three miles later it crosses under I-20, reverts to being called Mansfield Highway and curves to a slightly more westerly direction. A bit over a mile later it becomes a divided roadway with a grassy median. Two miles after this it changes names again, becoming South Riverside Drive. Here the road loses its median strip, becoming a four-lane undivided highway again as it gradually curves into a northerly course. It crosses East Berry Street at a signaled intersection and proceeds to East Rosedale Street about one and three-quarters miles north of that. Here it turns west to run concurrent with East Rosedale for a mile to I-35W. It runs with I-35W northward and crosses I-30 at an interchange. Just over half a mile north of the interchange it meets Spur 280 at another interchange and exits onto the spur, going west into Downtown Fort Worth. The spur splits as it enters the grid of one-way streets in downtown Fort Worth, with the west/northbound traffic on 4th Street and the east/southbound traffic on 5th Street. 4th Street turns onto Commerce Street and 5th Street turns onto Houston Street.

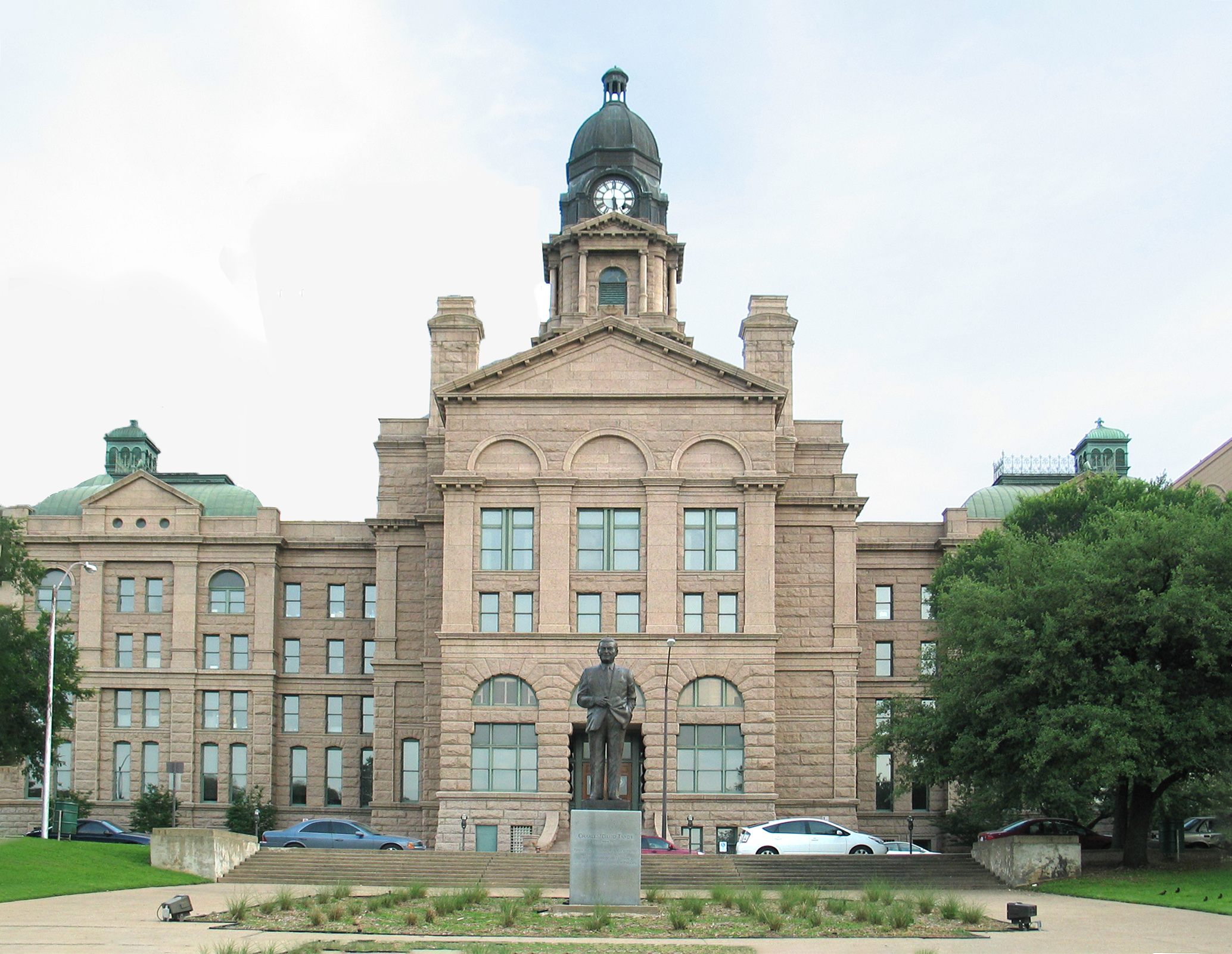
The Historic Tarrant County Courthouse

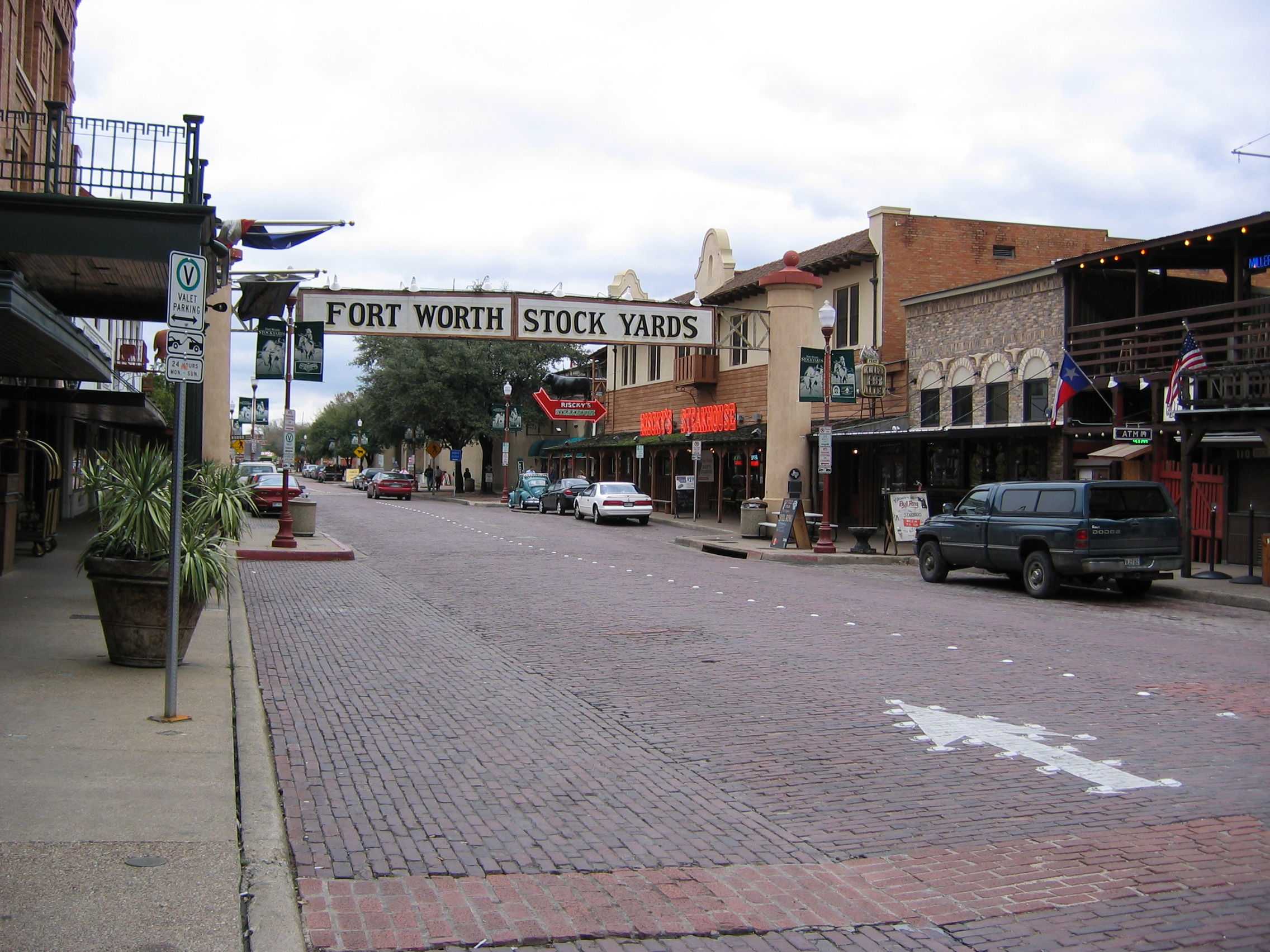
Entrance to the Fort Worth Stockyards, located on Business U.S. 287-P

Both streets join immediately north of the Tarrant County Courthouse and BU 287-P once again follows a four-lane undivided roadbed as it crosses north-northwest over the west fork of the Trinity River and runs concurrent with North Main Street. At the next signal light it divides, with a central turning lane separating traffic. The road continues this direction for about one and three-quarter miles before turning north at Marine Park. It now passes through the Stockyards and about one-third of a mile north of the turn, the road is paved with brick for about two blocks. It continues due north for about two-thirds of a mile until it crosses SH 183. Here it turns slightly north-northwest and continues either that direction or due north until it turns north-northwest to run between railroad tracks to the east and the Fort Worth Meacham International Airport on the west, providing direct access to the airport. It parallels the tracks, pulling away only to meet I-820 at a cloverleaf interchange before gradually angling back to its north-northwest path alongside the tracks and entering Saginaw city limits where it runs concurrent, first with Saginaw Boulevard and then with North Saginaw Boulevard. It leaves Saginaw city limits just north of Bailey Boswell Road and runs through a more rural setting of large farms, continuing north-northwest until it reaches a railway switching yard to its west where it turns due north. The railroad that had paralleled it to the east passes under it and diverges to the northwest. After passing through a mile and a half of various businesses serving long-haul truckers on the west and a residential area on the east, the highway ends as it intersects with FM 718/Avondale-Haslet Road at a signal light and meets the on-ramp to US 81.

== History ==
Bus. US 287-P was first proposed on June 21, 1990, and was approved and designated on January 14, 1991. The original route stretched from a junction with US 81/US 287 southward to US 287 in Mansfield, and replaced an old route of US 81/US 287 and a portion of Loop 496. The original length of the highway was approximately 39.5 miles (63.6 km) long. On October 25, 1990, the route of the highway was shortened by about a mile, and rerouted to Meacham Field, a few miles to the west of the original designation. The approximate length of BUS 287-P at this time was 38.88 miles (62.57 km) long. The route was minorly rerouted on January 5, 2012, although rerouting the highway was proposed on December 16, 2010. The course of the route was described as traveling from an intersection with US 287/US 81, southward through Saginaw, to Spur 280 in Fort Worth, and traveling on to I-35W, running concurrent with I-35W, then through Kennedale and on to Mansfield, to a southern terminus with US 287. In 2015, Minute Order 114256 changed the highway's route through Mansfield; the section of US 287-P between FM 157 and FM 917 was removed completely from the state highway system while the section from FM 917 to US 287 became a part of FM 917. As part of the same minute order, the highway was re-rerouted along the old section of FM 157 north to US 287, with FM 157 being re-routed onto the main US 287.

== Major junctions ==
The entire route is in Tarrant County.

Location	mi	km	Destinations	Notes
Mansfield	0.0	0.0	US 287 / FM 157	Interchange; southern terminus
Mansfield	2.6	4.2	FM 1187 west / West Debbie Lane	
Kennedale–Fort Worth line	9.5	15.3	I-20 / I-820 north	I-20 exit 442A
Fort Worth	17.2	27.7	I-35W south	South end of I-35W concurrency; I-35W exit 49B
Fort Worth	see I-35W			
Fort Worth	18.8	30.3	I-35W north (US 377 north) to SH 121 Spur 280 south to I-30 east / US 287 south – Dallas	North end of I-35W overlap; south end of Spur 280 overlap; no northbound exit to Spur 280 south; I-35W exit 52A
Fort Worth	19.4	31.2	Spur 280 ends / East 6th Street – Bass Performance Hall	North end of Spur 280 overlap; access to Fort Worth Central Station
Fort Worth	22.9	36.9	SH 183 (North 28th Street)	Access to North Side station
Fort Worth	24.4	39.3	FM 156 north (Terminal Road)	
Fort Worth	25.7	41.4	I-820	I-820 exit 13; cloverleaf interchange
Avondale	36.0	57.9	US 81 / US 287 / FM 718 west / Avondale-Haslet Road	Interchange; northern terminus; access to US 81 south / US 287 south via Avondale-Haslet Road
1.000 mi = 1.609 km; 1.000 km = 0.621 mi: Concurrency terminus
