= Farm to Market Road 156 =

Road in Texas, United States

Farm to Market Road 156

Route information
- Maintained by TxDOT
- Length: 38.822 mi (62.478 km)
- Existed: 1945–present

Major junctions
- South end: Bus. US 287 in Fort Worth
- I-820 in Saginaw; US 81 / US 287 in Fort Worth; US 380 near Krum
- North end: I-35 / US 77 in Sanger

Location
- Country: United States
- State: Texas

Highway system
- Highways in Texas; Interstate; US; State; Former; Toll; Loops; Spurs; FM/RM; Park; Rec
| ← SH 155 | → FM 157 |

Farm to Market Road 156 (FM 156) is a farm-to-market road located in North Texas.

== Route description ==
FM 156 begins at an intersection with Bus. US 287 in Fort Worth, near Meacham International Airport. The highway runs in an east–west direction traveling along Terminal Road, before turning north onto Blue Mound Road. After crossing I-820, FM 156 enters into the southeastern section of Saginaw. The highway briefly enters into the town of Blue Mound, before re-entering Saginaw. The highway runs back into Fort Worth, passing by the Bureau of Engraving and Printing, before intersecting US 81/US 287. North of US 81/287 FM 156 runs through sparsely populated areas of the city's northwest area. At School House Road, the highway loops around a rail line and enters Haslet.

Leaving Haslet, FM 156 turns to the east, passing a few miles to the west of Alliance Airport. The highway briefly enters Fort Worth again, interchanging with SH 114 near Texas Motor Speedway. Leaving Fort Worth, the highway runs through unincorporated areas of Denton County before entering Justin. Just outside Justin, FM 156 briefly runs through the western area of Northlake. The highway runs through the towns of Ponder and Krum before ending at I-35 in southern Sanger.

== History ==
FM 156 originally ran from US 287 to the Denton County line, first designated on June 4, 1945. On July 2 of that year, a second section was designated from SH 114 north through Justin, Ponder and Krum, where it turned northwest to end at Plainview School 7.4 miles (11.9 km) northwest of Krum. On December 17, 1945 (date of agreement March 23, 1946), the sections were connected. On March 30, 1949 the highway was rerouted north to Krum to end at US 77 south of Sanger; the old route was redesignated as part of FM 1173. The highway was rerouted around Haslet on March 26, 1991, with the old highway being turned over to the city. On June 27, 1995, the section of highway south of US 81/287 was re-designated as Urban Road 156 (UR 156) by the Texas Department of Transportation. The designation reverted to FM 156 with the elimination of the Urban Road system on November 15, 2018.

Several miles of the highway near Alliance Airport were realigned on August 26, 2010 as part of a $260 million runway extension project to allow heavily loaded cargo aircraft to take off in hot summer weather and reach Europe unrefueled.

== Junction list ==
| County | Location | mi | km | Destinations | Notes |
|---|---|---|---|---|---|
| Tarrant | Fort Worth | 0.0 | 0.0 | Bus. US 287 (Main Street) – Downtown Fort Worth, Meacham Airport | |
| Tarrant | Fort Worth–Saginaw line | | | I-820 (Jim Wright Freeway) | I-820 exit 15 |
| Tarrant | Fort Worth | | | FM 3479 east (Harmon Road) | |
| Tarrant | Fort Worth | | | US 81 / US 287 – Decatur | |
| Denton | Fort Worth | | | SH 114 – Dallas, Rhome | Interchange |
| Denton | Justin | | | FM 407 west – New Fairview | South end of FM 407 overlap |
| Denton | Justin | | | FM 407 east to I-35W – Argyle | North end of FM 407 overlap |
| Denton | | | | FM 1384 west | |
| Denton | Ponder | | | FM 2449 | |
| Denton | | | | US 380 – Decatur, Denton | Interchange |
| Denton | Krum | | | FM 1173 – Denton | |
| Denton | Krum | | | FM 2450 north – Bolivar | |
| Denton | Sanger | 38.822 | 62.478 | I-35 / US 77 – Gainesville, Denton | I-35 south exit 475A. |
1.000 mi = 1.609 km; 1.000 km = 0.621 mi: Concurrency terminus
