= Texas State Highway 10 =

State highway in Tarrant County, Texas, United States

State Highway 10
- Hurst Boulevard, Euless Boulevard
- SH 10 highlighted in red

Route information
- Maintained by TxDOT
- Length: 8.596 mi (13.834 km)
- Existed: August 29, 1979–present

Major junctions
- West end: I-820 / SH 121 / SH 183 in Fort Worth
- East end: SH 183 in Euless

Location
- Country: United States
- State: Texas
- Counties: Tarrant

Highway system
- Highways in Texas; Interstate; US; State; Former; Toll; Loops; Spurs; FM/RM; Park; Rec
← I-10	→ Spur 10

State Highway 10 (SH 10) runs from SH 183 in Euless to the intersection of I-820, SH 121 and SH 183 in Hurst. This highway was created when a portion of SH 183 was rerouted on August 29, 1979. It is locally known as Hurst Boulevard and Euless Boulevard. It passes near the main facility of Bell Helicopter Textron.

== Route description ==
SH 10 begins at the intersection of Interstate 820, SH 121, and SH 183 in Hurst. The highway travels east on Hurst Blvd, gradually turning to the northeast. The road name changes to Euless Blvd when it crosses Raider Drive. The route terminates in Euless when it reaches an intersection with SH 183 just west of SH 360.

== History ==
Historic SH 7A

An earlier incarnation of SH 10 was one of the original twenty-five state highways proposed on June 21, 1917, overlaid on top of the Fort Worth-Brady-Fort Stockton Highway. In 1919 the routing was proposed from the New Mexico state line to the junction of SH 54 and US 62. The proposed routing was never built. From the junction, SH 10 continued south over present-day SH 54 to Van Horn, then east on US 90 through Lobo to Alpine. The road continued eastward on present day US 67 into Fort Stockton, then followed present-day I-10 through Ozona and Sonora. From there, the road headed eastward on present-day RM 864 to US 190 through Brady. From there, it headed northeast on US 377 through Brownwood, Comanche, and Granbury toward its terminus in Fort Worth.

In late July 1917, the segment from New Mexico to Lobo (still a proposed route) was assigned to the ambitious SH 12 roadway.

On March 15, 1920, the routing from Alpine to Fort Stockton had not yet been built, so SH 10 and SH 12 were rerouted again in West Texas. SH 10 now left its old alignment at Valentine via the current RM 505 eastward to SH 166 and SH 17 into Fort Davis. A segment between Fort Davis and Fort Stockton was proposed using an old postal road, but the road was closed when SH 99 (later SH 10, now US 67) from Alpine to Fort Stockton was built. On August 21, 1923, SH 10 had lost all of its assignment west of Sonora, with the section concurrent with SH 27 dropped, the section from Fort Stockton to Valentine cancelled as it was never built, and west of there was transferred to SH 54, which was created to replace part of SH 12. The road was extended, however, through Fort Worth to Denton, replacing SH 40A. On November 19, 1923, the section of SH 10 from Brady to Sonora was cancelled. On March 16, 1925, SH 10 was extended north through Pilot Point to Tioga. On September 14, 1926, SH 10 was to be extended northeast to Sherman and southwest to Del Rio, with the designation not taken over until January 1, 1928. On February 20, 1928, the extension to Del Rio was modified to end 2 miles northeast of London. SH 10's north end was relocated to Whitesboro rather than Sherman. On March 3, 1931, the section of SH 10 from Brady to 2 miles northeast of London was cancelled, and SH 10 was rerouted on a new extension from Brady to Menard. On July 23, 1934, SH 10 was redirected southwest from Brownwood to Alpine, replacing SH 99. The old route to Menard became part of rerouted SH 23. On September 26, 1939, most of SH 10 was cancelled, leaving only the Denton-Whitesboro segment to the old highway. On January 29, 1942, SH 10 was extended to the Oklahoma state line. On October 29, 1960, that highway was redesignated as SH 99 (now US 377), which, coincidentally, had taken most of the western SH 10 segments in the 1930s and also was replaced by SH 10. On October 25, 1990, a section of old SH 10 in Dublin that had been abandoned but never removed was removed and returned to Dublin.

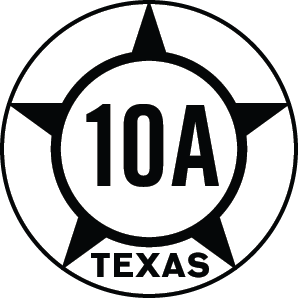
Historic SH 10A

SH 10A was a route near SH 10 designated on March 17, 1919, designated from Stephenville northeast to Dallas. On July 18, 1922, SH 10A extended to Strawn. On August 21, 1923, it had been redesignated as SH 68 (now US 67), and the section from Stephenville to Strawn was cancelled.

== Major intersections ==
The entire route is in Tarrant County.

Location	mi	km	Destinations	Notes
Hurst	0.0	0.0	I-820 / SH 121 / SH 183 to SH 121 Express / SH 183 Express	I-820 exit 24A
Euless	6.7	10.8	FM 157 (South Industrial Boulevard) to SH 183 Express	
Euless	8.6	13.8	SH 183 east	interchange
1.000 mi = 1.609 km; 1.000 km = 0.621 mi

== See also ==
- List of state highways in Texas
