= Handley–Ederville Road =

Highway in Texas, United States

- PASS Route 204

Route information
- Maintained by TxDOT and Tarrant County
- Length: 3.839 mi (6.178 km)
- Existed: c. 1954–present

Major junctions
- South end: Brentwood Stair Road in Fort Worth
- I-30 in Fort Worth; SH 121 in Richland Hills
- North end: SH 183 in Richland Hills

Location
- Country: United States
- State: Texas
- Counties: Tarrant

Highway system
- Highways in Texas; Interstate; US; State; Former; Toll; Loops; Spurs; FM/RM; Park; Rec

Handley–Ederville Road is a short arterial road located in the cities of Fort Worth and Richland Hills, in the northeastern region of Tarrant County, in the U.S. state of Texas. The highway is approximately 3.8 miles (6.1 km), and is usually a four-lane undivided highway. The portion of the highway that travels from an intersection with Texas State Highway 121 (SH 121) to Midway Road is maintained by the Texas Department of Transportation (TxDOT), as part of the unsigned Principle Arterial Street System, or PASS. The first section of the road existed by at least 1954, and the entire route existed by 1968.

== Route description ==
Handley–Ederville Road begins at its southern terminus, an intersection with Brentwood Stair Road, as an undivided, four-lane paved road. The highway proceeds north, passing over several exit ramps from Interstate 30 (I-30), in the process intersecting ramps coming to and from eastbound I-30. The roadway continues north, intersecting a small road that provides access to and from westbound I-30, and making a large S-curve past several small buildings and businesses. The road continues northeast, passing several small neighborhoods, and making a large curve northwest past several more neighborhoods. The route continues northwest, intersecting Randol Mill Road, and passing over the west fork of the Trinity River, and proceeding northward. The highway continues north, passing several large buildings, before intersecting Midway Road, where state maintenance begins.

Handley–Ederville Road continues northward, passing several more businesses, before reaching an interchange with SH 121, where state maintenance ends, and continuing north past a small neighborhood and additional businesses. The highway passes a few more small businesses, before reaching its northern terminus, an intersection with SH 183.

== History ==
By at least 1954, a short, unnamed, unimproved dirt road existed between SH 183 and Randol Mill Road, near the present location of Handley–Ederville Road. In 1957, this stretch was improved to a gravel surface, and was given route's present name. By at least five years later, a Y intersection had been constructed at the intersection with Randol Mill. Between 1962 and 1965, minor rerouting work was done on the stretch of road. By 1968, the rest of the present roadway was constructed, although the routing was still somewhat off. By 1973, most of the road had been reconstructed along the current routing. The entire length of the highway has been paved since. On June 28, 1988, the section of the road traveling from SH 121 to Midway Road, a distance of approximately 0.5 miles (0.80 km) was designated as PASS Route 204.

== Major junctions ==
The entire roadway is in Tarrant County.

Location	mi	km	Destinations	Notes
Fort Worth	0.000	0.000	Brentwood Stair Road	Southern terminus
Fort Worth	0.187– 0.384	0.301– 0.618	I-30 (Tom Landry Freeway) – Arlington	Exit 21-C on I-30
Richland Hills	2.834	4.561	Midway Road	Southern end of designation as PASS 204
Richland Hills	3.266– 3.338	5.256– 5.372	SH 121 (Airport Freeway) – Hurst, Haltom City	Northern end of designation as PASS 204; no eastbound access to SH 121
Richland Hills	3.839	6.178	SH 183 (Baker Boulevard)	Northern terminus
1.000 mi = 1.609 km; 1.000 km = 0.621 mi
