= City Place =

Mixed-use facility in Fort Worth, Texas

Coordinates: 32.75510°N 97.33425°W

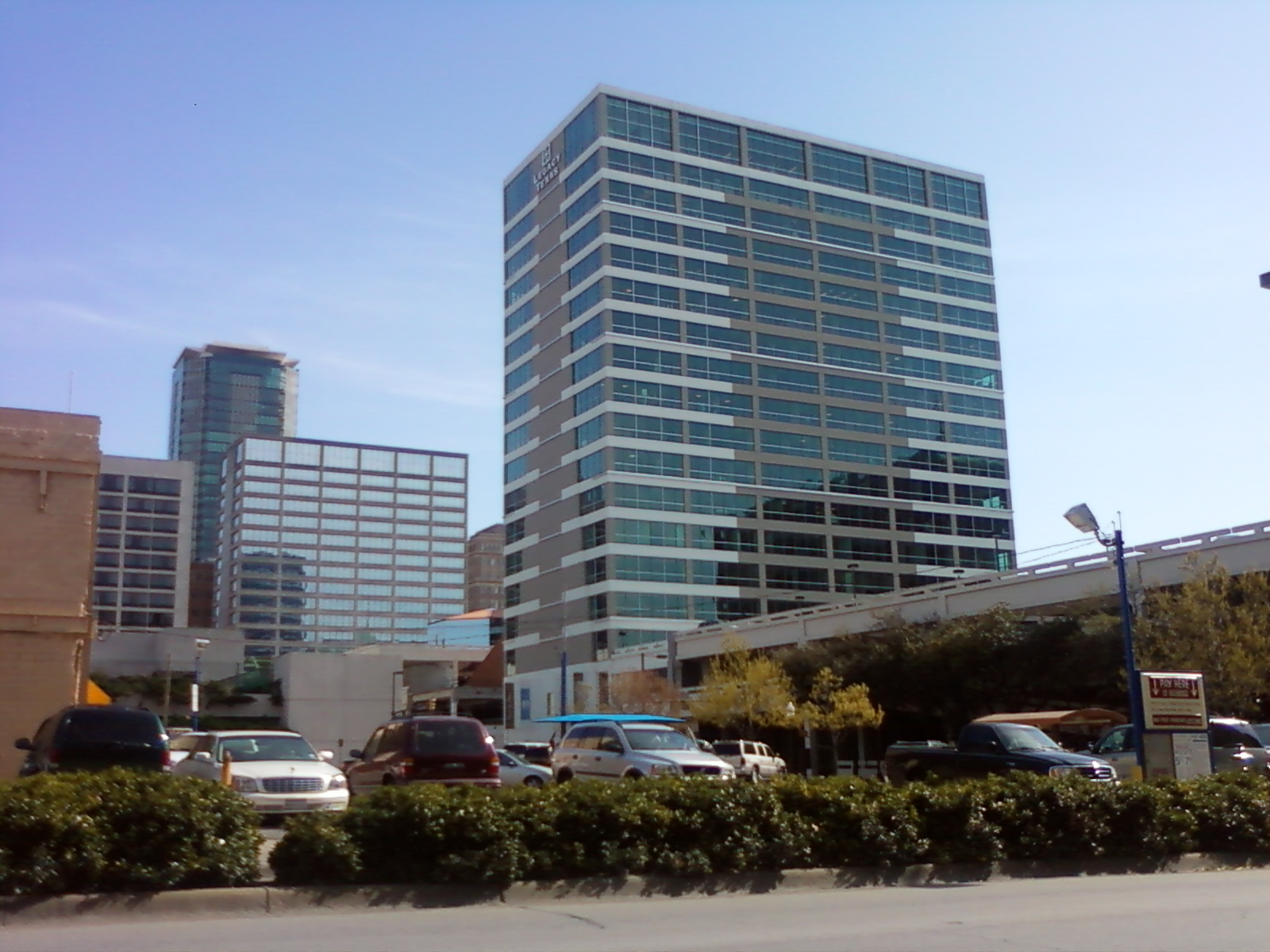
- Two City Place. One City Place is behind and to the left, with commercial space occupying the area between the two towers.
- Interactive map of the City Place area
- Former names: Tandy Center
- Alternative names: One City Place (south tower); Two City Place (north tower)

General information
- Architectural style: Modern
- Location: 100–300 Throckmorton Street, Fort Worth, Texas
- Completed: 1976 (Two Tandy Center); 1977–1978 (One Tandy Center and mall)
- Renovated: 1996; 2007–2014

Height
- Height: 258 ft (79 m) (Two City Place); 247 ft (75 m) (One City Place)

Design and construction
- Architect: Martin Growald

Other information
- Public transit: Trinity Metro; Tandy Center Subway (closed)

City Place is a mixed-use facility featuring two 20-story buildings in central Fort Worth, Texas. The complex was formerly known as Tandy Center and served as the corporate headquarters for RadioShack (formerly Tandy Corporation) for many years, designed by Growald Architects of Fort Worth, Texas and built by Beck. During the Tandy/RadioShack years, the complex included a mall and an ice skating rink.

Leonard's Department Store opened on the site on February 12, 1963. In 1967, the Tandy Corporation bought the chain of department stores. As the corporation grew, it needed a new headquarters and so it demolished the department store in 1974 and constructed its headquarters on the site. The new Tandy Center included two office towers as well as a mall with an indoor ice skating rink. The mall was anchored by Dillard's. In the 1990s the mall began to decline and the anchor tenant moved out in 1995. It was turned into an outlet store shopping center with hopes of it revitalizing Downtown Fort Worth, but these efforts failed and the mall was shuttered in the 2000s. It has since been demolished.

Originally built by the department store Leonard's as Leonard's M&O Subway, the Tandy Center Subway operated between the center and fringe parking lots from 1963 to 2002. When Leonard's was demolished the subway station was preserved and integrated into the new Tandy Center complex.

In 2000, a tornado hit Fort Worth, causing damage to several downtown buildings including the Tandy Center.

In 2001, the RadioShack Corporation sold the Tandy Center to another company, and made plans to construct a new corporate headquarters a few blocks away on the Trinity River. The new owner renamed the complex City Place. The former shopping mall was demolished in 2011, making way for a new garage with retail on the ground floor. As of 2021, City Place includes two multi-story buildings on opposite sides of Throckmorton Street, connected by a pedestrian skyway. The structures are made up principally of office and parking space.
