= Texas State Highway Spur 580 =

State highway in Texas

State Highway Spur 580
- Camp Bowie West

Route information
- Maintained by TxDOT
- Length: 5.395 mi (8.682 km)
- Existed: 1991–present

Major junctions
- West end: I-30 in Fort Worth
- I-820 in Fort Worth
- East end: US 377 in Fort Worth

Location
- Country: United States
- State: Texas

Highway system
- Highways in Texas; Interstate; US; State; Former; Toll; Loops; Spurs; FM/RM; Park; Rec
← Spur 579	→ Spur 581

Spur 580, also called Camp Bowie West, is a 5.395-mile (8.682 km) state highway spur route in western Fort Worth, Texas. Spur 580 is a former segment of U.S. Highway 80, and received its current designation when US 80 was decommissioned west of Mesquite, Texas. It is also a part of the older Bankhead Highway, which Spur 580 was once known as locally.

== Route description ==
The highway's western terminus is Exit 2 of Interstate 30 near the western boundary of Fort Worth. Heading generally in an easterly direction, the highway runs through the Westland neighborhood before intersecting Interstate 820 at a diamond interchange. Continuing through west Fort Worth, Spur 580 crosses Alta Mere Boulevard (State Highway 183) just before reaching its eastern terminus at Camp Bowie Boulevard (U.S. Highway 377). From this point, the former US 80 continued northeast on Camp Bowie (concurrent with US 377).

== History ==
Spur 580 is a former routing of US 80, and Spur 580 was designated on August 28, 1991, when U.S. Route 80 was decommissioned west of Mesquite, Texas. It is also a part of the older Bankhead Highway.

Because of the confusion resulting from one road with multiple names — including Highway 80 West, Bankhead Highway, Weatherford Highway and Spur 580 — the city of Fort Worth renamed it Camp Bowie West in 2001.

== Major junctions ==
The entire route is in Fort Worth, Tarrant County.

mi	km	Destinations	Notes
0.000	0.000	I-30	Western terminus; exit 2 on I-30
		RM 2871 (Longvue Avenue)	
		I-820	Exit 2 on I-820
		SH 183 (Alta Mere Drive)	
5.395	8.682	US 377 (Camp Bowie Boulevard)	Eastern terminus
1.000 mi = 1.609 km; 1.000 km = 0.621 mi
