= Texas State Highway 183 =

Highway in Texas

State Highway 183
- SH 183, highlighted in red

Route information
- Maintained by TxDOT
- Length: 35.942 mi (57.843 km)
- Existed: by 1939–present

Major junctions
- West end: I-20 in Fort Worth
- US 377 in Fort Worth I-30 in Fort Worth; I-35W / US 287 in Fort Worth; I-820 from Hurst to North Richland Hills; SH 121 from Hurst to Bedford; Pres. George Bush Turnpike / SH 161 in Irving SH 114 in Irving
- East end: I-35E / US 77 in Dallas

Location
- Country: United States
- State: Texas

Highway system
- Highways in Texas; Interstate; US; State; Former; Toll; Loops; Spurs; FM/RM; Park; Rec
← US 183	→ SH 184

State Highway 183 (SH 183) is a state highway in the Dallas–Fort Worth metroplex in Texas. Its most heavily used section is designated Airport Freeway where it serves the southern entrance of DFW Airport.

== History ==
SH 183 was designated on November 30, 1932 from SH 15 east of Mesquite via Mesquite to Dallas. This highway was SH 15A before March 19, 1930, and this highway was erroneously omitted from the March 19, 1930 highway log. On September 26, 1939, it was extended to Fort Worth, replacing a section of SH 15. On October 30, 1939, SH 183 was extended west from US 81 to US 80. On October 6, 1943, SH 183 was extended south from US 80 to US 377, and SH 183 was rerouted east to US 77 northwest of Dallas. The section east of US 77 was renumbered as SH 352, and the old route west of US 77 would be designated as FM 684 on February 26, 1946, but this would be changed to SH 356 on August 8, 1946. On December 4, 1957, SH 183 was rerouted to end at I 35-E, and the old route of SH 183 was transferred to Loop 12. On May 13, 1977, SH 183 was extended southeast to I-20 over cancelled Loop 820. On August 29, 1979, SH 183 was rerouted over Spur 350 and SH 121 and I-820. The old route of SH 183 was redesignated as SH 10.

== Route description ==
TX 183 begins in south Fort Worth, near Hulen Mall, heading to the northwest as a freeway from an interchange with I-20 and the Chisholm Trail Parkway. Entitled Southwest Boulevard, TX 183 crosses the Clear Fork of the Trinity River and meets Vickery Boulevard in a folded diamond interchange, from which it reverts to a three-lane arterial road. The route meets with US 377 in a large roundabout, shortly before heading north as Alta Mere Drive into an intersection with Camp Bowie West Boulevard (Spur 580). TX 183 meets I-30 in a cloverleaf interchange near Ridgmar Mall, turns northeast, and follows along the eastern boundaries of Fort Worth Naval Air Base and White Settlement as Westworth Boulevard.

Entering Westworth Village heading east, TX 183 forms a trumpet interchange with northbound Pumphrey Drive, connects with White Settlement Road, crosses the West Fork of the Trinity River, and becomes River Oaks Boulevard as it enters River Oaks. The road meets the intersection with Jacksboro Boulevard (TX 199) and is named Ephriham Avenue until it enters the North Side neighborhood of Fort Worth, where the road is called NW 28th Street. TX 183 continues east as NE 28th Street, passing north of the Fort Worth Stockyards and running over the interchange with I-35W, after which it forms the northern boundaries of Mount Olivet Cemetery.

TX 183 proceeds through the residential neighborhoods of Haltom City until it joins US 377 at an intersection, turning northeast onto Belknap Street. US 377 departs from Belknap Street at Denton Highway, leaving TX 183 on Belknap Street until the route diverges eastward from Belknap Street and the southern terminus of TX 26 as Baker Boulevard. The route continues through Richland Hills until meeting the interchange with I-820 concurrent with TX 121. TX 183 turns north, joining both routes, and turns east along with TX 121 as I-820 turns west at a large interchange in North Richland Hills. In northern Hurst, TX 183 and TX 121 are joined with the North Tarrant Express tollway from the I-820 interchange. TX 121 departs at another interchange in Bedford. TX 183, along with its tollway, remains on the Airport Freeway, meeting TX 360 in an interchange at Euless. The route connects with the southern end of International Parkway, which proceeds north into DFW Airport as TX 183 continues eastward.

Entering Dallas County, TX 183 forms an interchange with the President George Bush Turnpike. As the route enters Irving, it forms a cloverleaf interchange with North Belt Line Road, which connects with Irving Boulevard (TX 356). TX 183 then enters the former site of the Texas Stadium, proceeding into an interchange with Walton Walker Boulevard (Loop 12) and its toll road. Spur 482 stems off the highway before TX 183 merges with TX 114, heading southeast as John W. Carpenter Freeway until both routes terminate in a merger with I-35E in Dallas.

== Exit list ==
All exits are unnumbered.

County	Location	mi	km	Destinations	Notes
Tarrant	Fort Worth	0.0	0.0	I-20 / Hulen Street – Dallas	I-20 exit 432 westbound.
Tarrant	Fort Worth	0.9	1.4	Chisholm Trail Parkway / Bryant Irvin Road	No westbound exit
Tarrant	Benbrook	1.3	2.1	Crosslands Road	Eastbound exit and westbound entrance
Tarrant	Fort Worth	1.9	3.1	Ridglea Country Club Drive	
Tarrant	Fort Worth	2.2	3.5	Vickery Boulevard	interchange; west end of the freeway
Tarrant	Fort Worth	3.6	5.8	US 377 (Benbrook Highway/Camp Bowie West Boulevard)	Traffic circle
Tarrant	Fort Worth	4.0	6.4	Spur 580 (Camp Bowie West Boulevard)	
Tarrant	Fort Worth	5.0	8.0	I-30 / Spur 341 (Lockheed Boulevard) – Weatherford	Exit 7B (I-30)
Tarrant	Westworth Village	7.0	11.3	NAS Fort Worth JRB / FMC Carswell	Interchange
Tarrant	Fort Worth	10.0	16.1	SH 199 (Jacksboro Highway)	
Tarrant	Fort Worth	10.8	17.4	FM 1220 north (Azle Avenue)	
Tarrant	Fort Worth	12.2	19.6	Bus. US 287 (North Main Street)	
Tarrant	Fort Worth	13.8	22.2	I-35W / US 287	Exit 54 (I-35W)
Tarrant	Haltom City	16.8	27.0	US 377 south (Belknap Street)	West end of the overlap with US 377
Tarrant	Haltom City	17.3	27.8	US 377 north (Denton Highway)	East end of the overlap with US 377
Tarrant	Haltom City	18.6	29.9	SH 26 north	Interchange; no eastbound entrance
Tarrant	Richland Hills	19.0	30.6	To Rufe Snow Drive / SH 26	
Tarrant	Hurst	20.9	33.6	I-820 south / SH 121 south – Downtown Ft Worth SH 10 east	West end of the overlap with I-820 / SH 121; SH 183 west follows exit 24A
Tarrant	Hurst	21.7	34.9	Pipeline Road/Glenview Drive	Exit 23 (I-820), access to North Hills Hospital
Tarrant	Hurst			SH 121 Express north / SH 183 Express east to FM 157	eastbound exit and westbound entrance; Exit 23A (I-820)
Tarrant	Hurst	22.0	35.4	SH 26 / FM 1938 north (Davis Bouleavrd) / Bedford-Euless Road – Colleyville, TCC Northeast Campus	Exit 22B (I-820)
Tarrant	Hurst	22.6	36.4	I-820 west	North end of the overlap with I-820; SH 183 east follows exit 22A
Tarrant	Hurst	23.5	37.8	FM 3029 north (Precinct Line Road) / Hurstview Drive	
Tarrant	Hurst–Bedford line	24.8	39.9	Norwood Drive, Brown Trail	
Tarrant	Bedford	25.6	41.2	Bedford Road, Forest Ridge Drive	
Tarrant	Bedford	26.4	42.5	Central Drive, Forest Ridge Drive	
Tarrant	Bedford	27.1	43.6	SH 121 north – DFW Airport NORTH ENTRY	East end of the overlap with SH 121; no direct westbound exit (signed at Murphy Drive)
Tarrant	Bedford	27.4	44.1	Westpark Way/Murphy Drive	
Tarrant	Bedford			SH 121 Express south / SH 183 Express west to I-820	Westbound exit and eastbound entrance
Tarrant	Bedford–Euless line	28.6	46.0	FM 157 (Industrial Boulevard)	
Tarrant	Euless	29.1	46.8	Ector Drive	no direct westbound exit (signed at Euless Main Street)
Tarrant	Euless	29.3	47.2	Euless Main Street	
Tarrant	Euless	30.3	48.8	SH 10 west	Westbound exit and eastbound entrance
Tarrant	Fort Worth	30.8	49.6	SH 360 / FAA Road – Grand Prairie, Arlington, Grapevine, Euless	
Tarrant	Fort Worth	31.5	50.7	Amon Carter Boulevard	
Tarrant	Fort Worth	32.0	51.5	DFW Airport	
Dallas	Irving	32.6	52.5	County Line Road, Valley View Lane	
Dallas	Irving	33.4	53.8	Pres. George Bush Turnpike / SH 161 north	
Dallas	Irving	33.8	54.4	Esters Road	
Dallas	Irving	34.7	55.8	SH 356 (Irving Boulevard) / Belt Line Road	
Dallas	Irving	35.7	57.5	Story Road	
Dallas	Irving			Frontage Road	Westbound access only
Dallas	Irving	36.7	59.1	MacArthur Boulevard	Access to Baylor Medical Center of Irving
Dallas	Irving	37.2	59.9	O'Connor Road	
Dallas	Irving	38.0	61.2	Frontage Road	
Dallas	Irving	38.5	62.0	Carl Road	
Dallas	Irving	39.1	62.9	University of Dallas	Westbound exit only
Dallas	Irving	39.4	63.4	Loop 12	
Dallas	Irving	40.2	64.7	SH 114 / Spur 482 – Grapevine, DFW Airport NORTH ENTRY	
Dallas	Irving	40.6	65.3	Grauwyler Road	
Dallas	Dallas	41.3	66.5	Regal Row	
Dallas	Dallas	42.2	67.9	Frontage Road	Westbound exit and eastbound entrance
Dallas	Dallas	42.5	68.4	Mockingbird Lane – Dallas Love Field Airport	
Dallas	Dallas	42.7	68.7	I-35E south	Exit 433A (I-35E)
1.000 mi = 1.609 km; 1.000 km = 0.621 mi: Concurrency terminus; Incomplete access; Unopened

== Bibliography ==
- Fort Worth Street Map. Chicago, Illinois: Rand McNally, 1990. ISBN 0-528-96843-2
- "Dallas/Ft. Worth & Vicinity." Texas Atlas & Gazetteer. First edition. Freeport, Maine: DeLorme Mapping, 1995. ISBN 0-89933-241-2
- "Dallas/Ft. Worth & Vicinity." The Road Atlas: United States, Canada & Mexico. Skokie, Illinois: Rand McNally, 2001. ISBN 0-528-84286-2
