= Texas State Highway 121 =

Highway in Texas

State Highway 121
- SH 121; mainline in red, business routes in blue

Route information
- Maintained by TxDOT
- Length: 85.563 mi (137.700 km)
- Existed: by 1939–present

Major junctions
- South end: US 67 in Cleburne
- I-35W / US 287 / US 377 / Spur 347 in Fort Worth: I-820 from Richland Hills to North Richland Hills; I-635 in Grapevine; I-35E / US 77 in Lewisville; Dallas North Tollway in Plano; US 75 from McKinney to Melissa; US 69 in Trenton; US 82 in Bonham
- North end: SH 78 in Bonham

Location
- Country: United States
- State: Texas

Highway system
- Highways in Texas; Interstate; US; State; Former; Toll; Loops; Spurs; FM/RM; Park; Rec
← SH 120	→ SH 122

State Highway 121 (SH 121) is a state highway angling from southwest to northeast through north central Texas. It runs from Cleburne, Texas at US 67 to SH 78 in Bonham, Texas, just north of a junction with US 82.

Between Fort Worth and Euless, SH 121 is known as Airport Freeway (east of Euless, this name applies to SH 183). East of Coppell, the highway functions as the frontage road for the Sam Rayburn Tollway, a toll road that runs northeast to McKinney. From McKinney to Melissa, the state highway is concurrent with US 75 and the North Central Expressway. Northeast of Melissa, SH 121 is a less-traveled roadway often referred to as the Sam Rayburn Highway.

== Route description ==
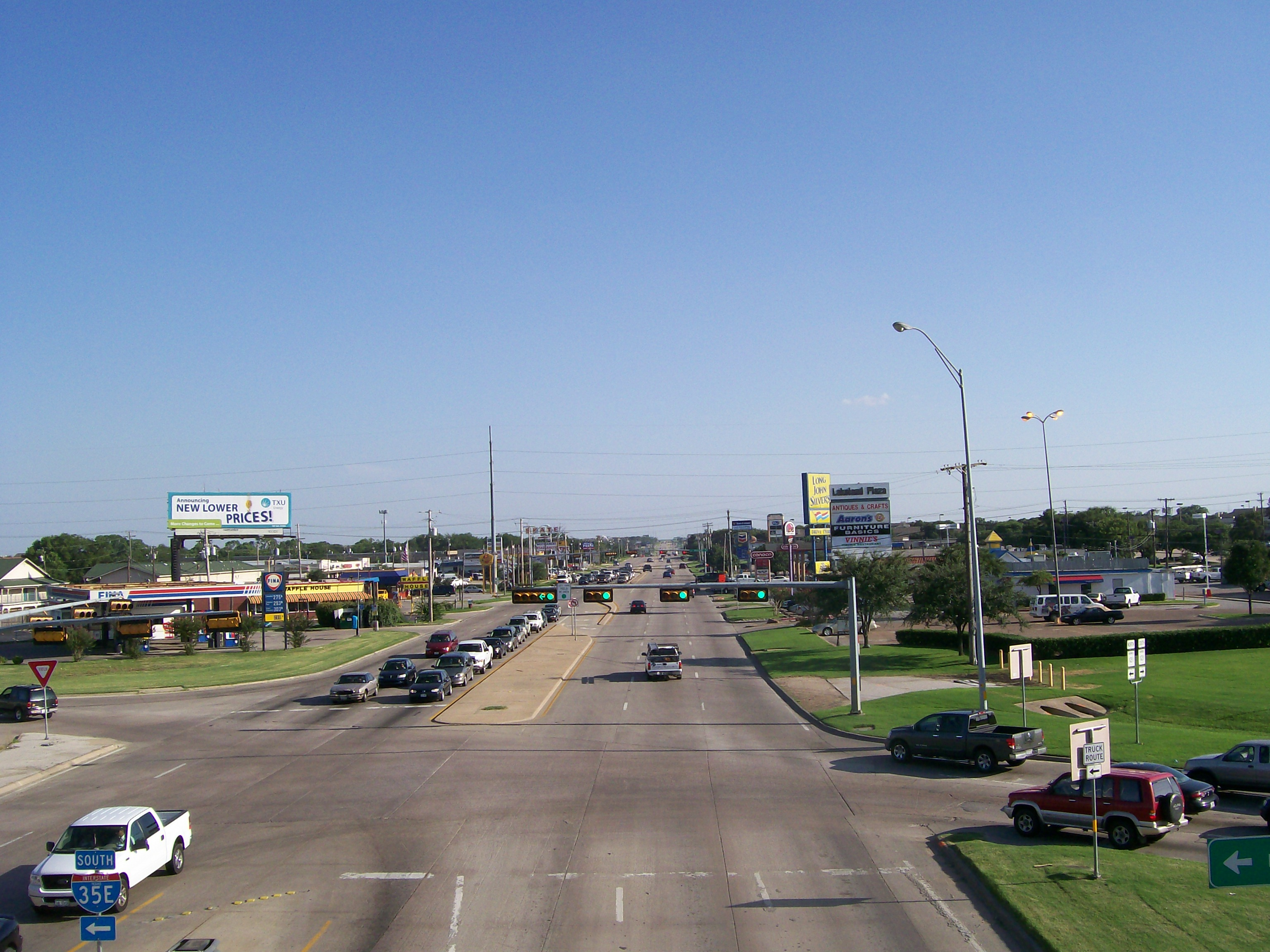
SH 121 Business west from I-35E towards Grapevine

Sections between downtown Fort Worth and Grapevine are freeway, including a small segment near Hurst that coincides with Interstate 820. At Bedford, Texas it has an interchange with SH 183, the Irving freeway that leads toward Dallas; it has an interchange with SH 360, which leads toward Arlington, just to the west of the north entrance to the Dallas/Fort Worth International Airport, to which State Highway 121 gives access. At Grapevine it has interchanges with SH 114 and Interstate 635 before becoming a limited-access tollway that passes between Lewisville and Frisco.

Signage originally used on the tolled mainlanes of SH 121 (now the Sam Rayburn Tollway) from 2006 to 2009.

It is very heavily traveled south and west of McKinney and has become an urban highway due to the rapid growth of the Dallas–Fort Worth metroplex. Service roads extending southwest to northeast along the corridor from Lewisville to McKinney are free of charge; however the main lanes within the right-of-way are tolled as part of the Sam Rayburn Tollway operated by the North Texas Tollway Authority (NTTA). The highway's northeastern section between Melissa and Bonham carries less traffic and until recently was a two-lane rural highway. However, in recent years with an increase in traffic, the 19 mile section between the Collin–Fannin county line and its junction with SH 56 in Bonham has been upgraded to a "Super Two" highway system. This allows for alternating passing lanes. Beginning in 2016, the segment between Melissa and the Collin–Fannin county line is being upgraded to a four-lane divided highway system. In addition, a two-mile stretch between SH 56 and US 82 within Bonham city limits, was upgraded to a four-lane highway system with a continuous left-hand turn lane. Long term planning calls for upgrading the 19 mile stretch, from the Collin–Fannin county line to SH 56 in Bonham, into a four-lane divided highway system.

It meets Interstate 35E at Lewisville, SH 289 near Frisco, US 75 and US 380 in McKinney, US 69 at Trenton, and SH 78 just north of Bonham.

Construction began in 2009 on the extension of 121 south from Fort Worth to Cleburne, as a toll road called Chisholm Trail Parkway in Tarrant and Johnson Counties. This section is operated by the NTTA and the entire project, from I-30 to U.S. 67 opened to traffic in 2013.

In March 2009, work was completed on the eventual southbound lanes on a short stretch of 121 northeast of DFW Airport, which currently shares southbound and northbound traffic. This work upgraded two signalized at-grade intersections to a freeway, with overpasses at both intersections, improving traffic in that area. The northbound freeway lanes are currently under construction, which also include new, separate exits and entrances for Freeport Parkway and Grapevine Mills Boulevard/Sandy Lake Road.

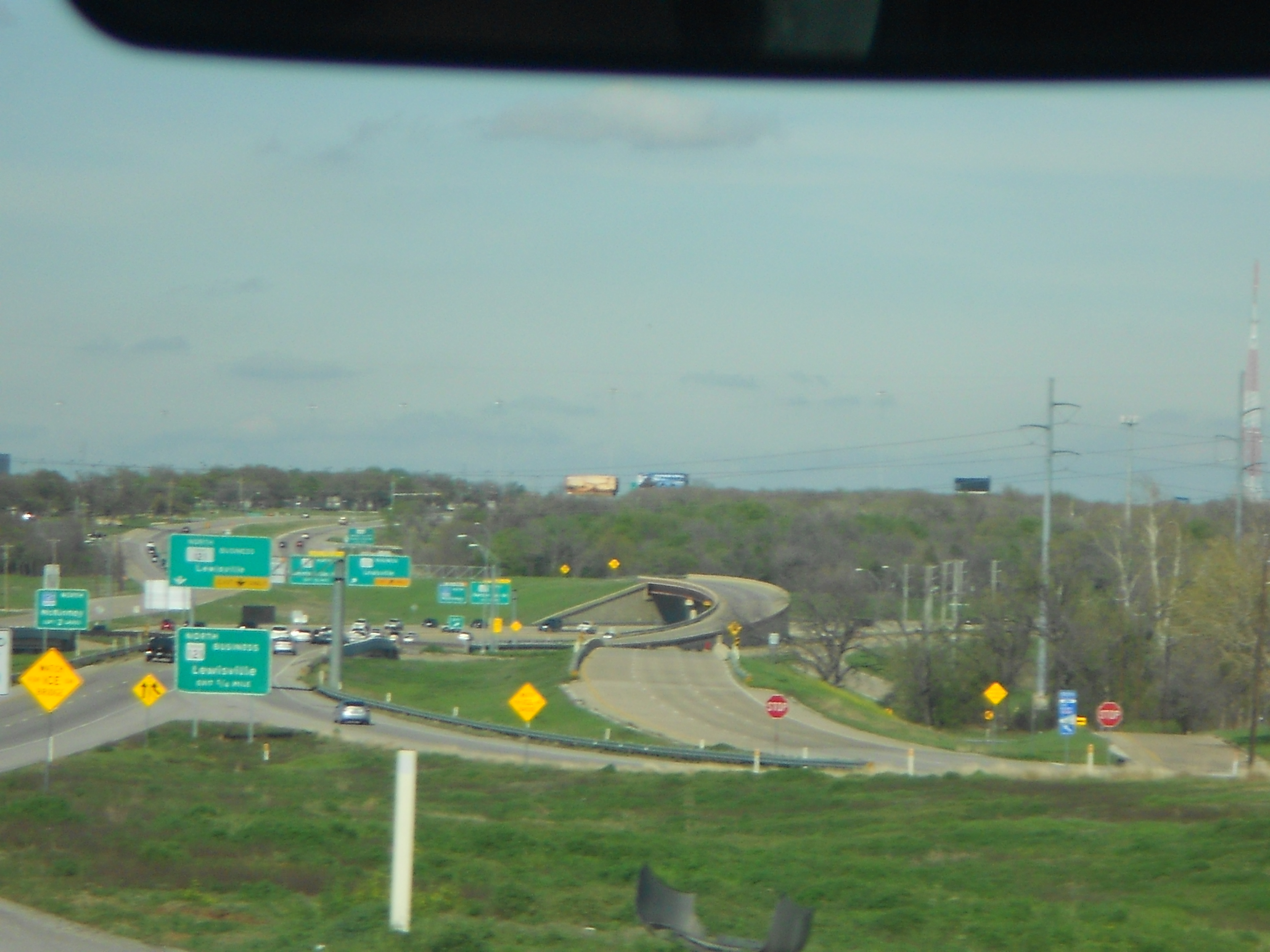
Interchange between SH 121 and SH 121 Business Route

== Sam Rayburn Tollway ==
From McKinney to Coppell, State Highway 121 acts as a frontage road to Sam Rayburn Tollway, contrary to the popular misconception that the Sam Rayburn Tollway was the new SH 121.

=== Controversy ===
In early 2007, the Spanish firm Cintra agreed to a $2.8 billion, 50-year deal where they would lease the highway from TxDOT, finish building and maintain it, and collect the tolls. However, critics of the deal questioned both its length—the contract allowed Cintra to collect tolls for 50 years—and the fact that the North Texas Tollway Authority (NTTA) was prevented from bidding on the contract. In addition, general opposition to the toll plan organized, pointing out that the segment through Denton County had already been paid for by taxpayer money.

To answer some of these complaints, Texas legislators pressed the Texas Department of Transportation to allow the NTTA to bid. The Authority announced their proposed bid in early May 2007, which would provide approximately $3.3 billion in road funding, but is based on traffic counts that differ from those used by Cintra.

On June 28, 2007, the Texas Transportation Commission announced it would pursue the proposal from the North Texas Tollway Authority (NTTA).

== History ==
SH 121 was originally numbered on March 17, 1927, as a direct routing between Fort Worth and SH 40 near the Dallas–Denton county line. On April 24, 1928, it was extended to McKinney. By 1933, the route had been completed from Ft. Worth northeast through Grapevine to its intersection with SH 40/U.S. Route 77 in far southern Denton County. On July 15, 1935, the east end was truncated to the Denton–Dallas county line. On January 6, 1939, the section from the Dallas–Denton county line to SH 40/US 77 was restored. A road was designated on February 21, 1938, from SH 114 to SH 121; either SH 114 Loop or SH 121 Loop. This was renumbered as Loop 10 on September 26, 1939.

On November 24, 1941, SH 121 was extended from old US 77 to new US 77. On December 16, 1943, the section of SH 121 from US 77 (former SH 40) to McKinney was restored, and the ambitious plan to extend SH 121 northeast beyond McKinney to Bonham was approved by TxDOT, a part of which absorbed Farm to Market Road 82 between Bonham and Trenton. The section from Bonham to Randolph was designated as SH 263 until March 21, 1939. It was not until 1954 that the next section of this highway was completed between U.S. 77 at Lewisville and U.S. Route 75 near McKinney. The final section between McKinney and Trenton was not completed until November 20, 1963, including an extension around the western side of Bonham. In 1965, the section from downtown Fort Worth to Interstate 820 was transferred to newly completed freeway sections. In November 1969, SH 121 was rerouted over Spur 459, which was cancelled. The old route of SH 121 was given to the city of Grapevine.

TxDOT proposed extending SH 121 to FM 1187, via a route to be known as the Northside–Southwest Freeway, on October 4, 1973. This proposed extension was canceled on August 29, 1985.

On April 14, 1980, SH 121 was relocated in Bedford and Grapevine. On November 18, 1999, SH 121 was rerouted over Texas State Highway Spur 553, which was cancelled. The old route of SH 121 became Business SH 121. On February 27, 2003, the SH 121 designation was extended to US 67 in Cleburne. This extension, known as the Chisholm Trail Parkway (CTP), was built in stages from 2008 to 2014 and opened to traffic on May 11, 2014. The CTP's frontage roads in southwest Fort Worth are signed as SH 121.

== Major intersections ==
County	Location	mi	km	Destinations	Notes
See Chisholm Trail Parkway, I-30, and I-35W
Tarrant	Fort Worth	0.0	0.0	I-35W / US 287 / US 377 south – Waco, Denton Spur 347 west (Belknap Street) – Downtown Fort Worth	I-35W exit 52B, access to Fort Worth Central Station via westbound Spur 347
Tarrant	Fort Worth	0.8	1.3	Sylvania Avenue	
Tarrant	Fort Worth	1.2	1.9	Riverside Drive	
Tarrant	Fort Worth	2.1	3.4	Beach Street	
Tarrant	Fort Worth	2.7	4.3	Maxine Street	Northbound exit and southbound entrance
Tarrant	Haltom City	3.1	5.0	Haltom Road	
Tarrant	Haltom City	4.2	6.8	Carson Street	
Tarrant	Haltom City	4.9	7.9	Minnis Drive	
Tarrant	Richland Hills	6.4	10.3	Handley–Ederville Road	Access to Trinity Lakes Station
Tarrant	Hurst	7.3	11.7	I-820 south	south end of I-820 overlap; SH 121 south follows exit 24B
Tarrant	Hurst			SH 10 east / SH 183 west – Richland Hills	south end of SH 183 overlap; I-820 exit 24A
Tarrant	Hurst	8.4	13.5	Pipeline Road / Glenview Drive	I-820 exit 23, access to North Hills Hospital
Tarrant	Hurst			SH 121 Express north / SH 183 Express east to FM 157	northbound exit and southbound entrance; I-820 exit 23A
Tarrant	Hurst	8.5	13.7	SH 26 / FM 1938 north (Davis Boulevard) / Bedford-Euless Road – Colleyville, TCC Northeast Campus	I-820 exit 22B
Tarrant	Hurst	8.9	14.3	I-820 west	north end of I-820 overlap; SH 121 north follows exit 22A
Tarrant	Hurst	10.1	16.3	FM 3029 north (Precinct Line Road) / Hurstview Drive	
Tarrant	Hurst–Bedford line	11.5	18.5	Norwood Drive / Brown Trail	
Tarrant	Bedford	12.5	20.1	Bedford Road / Forest Ridge Drive	
Tarrant	Bedford	13.0	20.9	Central Drive / Forest Ridge Drive	Access to Texas Health HEB
Tarrant	Bedford	13.6	21.9	SH 183 east – DFW Airport South Entry, Irving	north end of SH 183 overlap; no direct southbound exit (signed at Murphy Drive)
Tarrant	Bedford	14.0	22.5	Westpark Way / Murphy Drive	
Tarrant	Bedford	15.0	24.1	Harwood Road	
Tarrant	Bedford			SH 121 Express south / SH 183 Express west to I-820	southbound exit and northbound entrance
Tarrant	Bedford–Euless line	16.7	26.9	FM 157 south / Cheek-Sparger Road	
Tarrant	Euless–Grapevine line	17.2	27.7	Glade Road	
Tarrant	Grapevine	18.1	29.1	Hall-Johnson Road	
Tarrant	Grapevine	18.7	30.1	To SH 360 / Stone Myers Parkway	Northbound exit and southbound entrance
Tarrant	Grapevine	19.3	31.1	SH 360 south – Arlington	Southbound exit and northbound entrance
Tarrant	Grapevine	20.8	33.5	SH 114 west (SH 26 south) to FM 1709 / William D. Tate Avenue – Bridgeport	south end of SH 114 overlap
Tarrant	Grapevine	21.9	35.2	SH 26 north / Bus. SH 114 west (Texan Trail) / Main Street – Grapevine Historic District	no northbound entrance
Tarrant	Grapevine	22.4	36.0	SH 114 east – Dallas	North end of SH 114 overlap
Tarrant	Grapevine	22.9	36.9	DFW Airport (International Parkway)	
Tarrant	Grapevine	24.3	39.1	I-635 east	I-635 exit 36
Tarrant	Grapevine	24.7	39.8	Bass Pro Drive / Bethel Road / Grapevine Mills Trail	
Tarrant	Grapevine	25.3	40.7	FM 2499 north (Grapevine Mills Parkway) – Flower Mound	northbound exit and southbound entrance, access to Grapevine Mills Mall
Dallas	Coppell–Grapevine line	26.2	42.2	Grapevine Mills Boulevard / Sandy Lake Road / Freeport Parkway	
Denton	Lewisville	27.6	44.4	Bus. SH 121 north – Lewisville	
Dallas	Coppell–Lewisville line	28.8	46.3	Sam Rayburn Tollway north / Denton Tap Road – McKinney	north end of freeway; south end of Sam Rayburn Tollway
Denton	Lewisville	30.0	48.3	Sam Rayburn Tollway / MacArthur Boulevard	
Denton	Lewisville	31.1	50.1	Sam Rayburn Tollway south / I-35E (US 77) – Denton, Dallas, D/FW Airport, Fort Worth	south end of Sam Rayburn Tollway overlap; south end of freeway; I-35E exits 447A-447B-448A
Denton	Carrollton	32.3	52.0	Marchant Boulevard / Huffines Boulevard	
Denton	Carrollton	33.2	53.4	Sam Rayburn Tollway north / Hebron Parkway	north end of Sam Rayburn Tollway overlap; north end of freeway
Denton	Carrollton	34.3	55.2	Sam Rayburn Tollway / Carrollton Parkway	
Denton	Lewisville	35.1	56.5	Sam Rayburn Tollway south / FM 544	
Denton	Lewisville	35.7	57.5	Sam Rayburn Tollway / Bus. SH 121 south / FM 2281 south – Lewisville	
Denton	Lewisville	36.6	58.9	Sam Rayburn Tollway / Standridge Drive / Castle Hills Drive	
Denton	Lewisville	36.9	59.4	Sam Rayburn Tollway / FM 423 north (Main Street) / Josey Lane – Little Elm	
Denton	The Colony	38.3	61.6	Sam Rayburn Tollway / Paige Road / Plano Parkway	
Denton	The Colony			Sam Rayburn Tollway south	southbound exit and northbound entrance
Denton	The Colony	39.9	64.2	Sam Rayburn Tollway / Spring Creek Parkway	
Collin	Plano–Frisco line	40.7	65.5	Sam Rayburn Tollway / Legacy Drive	
Collin	Plano–Frisco line	41.7	67.1	To Dallas North Tollway / Dallas Parkway	
Collin	Plano–Frisco line			Sam Rayburn Tollway / Parkwood Boulevard	
Collin	Plano–Frisco line	42.8	68.9	Sam Rayburn Tollway north / Dallas North Tollway / SH 289 (Preston Road)	
Collin	Plano–Frisco line			Sam Rayburn Tollway / Ohio Drive	interchange
Collin	Plano–Frisco line	43.9	70.7	Sam Rayburn Tollway north / Hillcrest Road / Rasor Boulevard	
Collin	Plano–Frisco line	45.2	72.7	Sam Rayburn Tollway / Coit Road	
Collin	Plano–Frisco line	46.3	74.5	Sam Rayburn Tollway / Independence Parkway	
Collin	Plano–Frisco– Allen–McKinney quadripoint	47.2	76.0	Sam Rayburn Tollway south / FM 2478 north (Custer Road)	
Collin	Allen–McKinney line	48.1	77.4	Sam Rayburn Tollway / Exchange Parkway	
Collin	Allen–McKinney line	49.0	78.9	Sam Rayburn Tollway north / Alma Drive	
Collin	Allen–McKinney line	50.0	80.5	Sam Rayburn Tollway / Stacy Road	
Collin	Allen–McKinney line	50.8	81.8	Sam Rayburn Tollway / Watters Road / Lake Forest Drive	
Collin	Allen–McKinney line	51.8	83.4	Sam Rayburn Tollway / Chelsea Boulevard / Hardin Boulevard	
Collin	Allen–McKinney line	52.9	85.1	US 75 south to SH 5 (via Spur 399 east) – Dallas	south end of US 75 overlap; SH 121 south follows exit 39
Collin	see US 75				
Collin	Melissa	61.2	98.5	US 75 north – Sherman	north end of US 75 overlap; SH 121 north follows exit 45
Collin	Melissa			SH 5 south	south end of SH 5 overlap
Collin	Melissa	62.2	100.1	SH 5 north – Melissa, Anna	Interchange; north end of SH 5 overlap
Collin	Melissa	63.7	102.5	FM 545 (East Melissa Road) – Melissa, Blue Ridge	
Collin	Melissa	64.9	104.4	FM 2933 south – New Hope	
Collin	Anna			Outer Loop Road	
Collin	Anna			FM 455 west – Anna	south end of FM 455 overlap
Collin	Anna			FM 455 east to FM 2862	north end of FM 455 overlap
Collin		71.6	115.2	FM 2862 – Westminster	
Collin	Desert	75.4	121.3	SH 160 – Whitewright, Blue Ridge	
Fannin	Trenton			FM 814 west	south end of FM 814 overlap
Fannin	Trenton			FM 814 east – Trenton	north end of FM 814 overlap
Fannin	Trenton	80.7	129.9	US 69 / Bus. US 69 – Whitewright, Leonard	Interchange
Fannin		86.0	138.4	Bus. SH 121 north	
Fannin		86.5	139.2	SH 11 – Sherman, Commerce	Interchange
Fannin		87.7	141.1	Bus. SH 121 south – Randolph	
Fannin		90.5	145.6	FM 1629 east – Edhube	
Fannin		93.0	149.7	Spur 311 north to SH 56 west – Sherman, Sam Rayburn House	
Fannin	Bonham	93.7	150.8	SH 56 west – Sherman	South end of SH 56 overlap
Fannin	Bonham	94.2	151.6	SH 56 east – Bonham, Sam Rayburn Library	North end of SH 56 overlap
Fannin	Bonham	96.1	154.7	US 82 – Sherman, Paris	US 82 exit 670
Fannin	Bonham	96.9	155.9	FM 898 west – Ector	
Fannin		98.3	158.2	SH 78 – Durant, Bonham	
1.000 mi = 1.609 km; 1.000 km = 0.621 mi: Concurrency terminus; Electronic toll collection; Incomplete access

== Business routes ==
=== Randolph ===
Business State Highway 121-D
- Location: Randolph
- Length: 1.734 mi (2.791 km)
- Existed: 1990–present

Business State Highway 121-D (Bus. SH 121-D) is a business route of SH 121 that serves the town of Randolph. The highway was designated in 1990 with the mileage being transferred from Loop 451.

Bus. SH 121-D begins at an intersection with SH 121 and travels northeast before intersecting with FM 896. After intersecting with FM 896, the highway runs north and has a brief overlap with SH 11 through the town. After leaving the concurrency with SH 11, Bus. SH 121-D runs north and northeast before ending at an intersection with SH 121.

Junction list

The entire route is in Fannin County.

Location	mi	km	Destinations	Notes
	0.0	0.0	SH 121	
Randolph	0.5	0.80	FM 896 south – Leonard	
Randolph	0.6	0.97	SH 11 west – Whitewright, Bonham	South end of SH 11 overlap
Randolph	0.7	1.1	SH 11 east – Bailey	North end of SH 11 overlap
	1.7	2.7	SH 121	
1.000 mi = 1.609 km; 1.000 km = 0.621 mi: Concurrency terminus

=== Lewisville ===
Business State Highway 121-H
- Location: Dallas and Denton counties
- Length: 8.486 mi (13.657 km)
- Existed: 1999–present

Business State Highway 121-H (Bus. SH 121-H) is a business route of SH 121 that serves the town of Lewisville. The highway was designated in 1999 when SH 121 was re-routed around the city.

Bus. SH 121-H begins at an interchange with SH 121/Sam Rayburn Tollway in Coppell. The highway runs northeast through industrial areas of Lewisville and turns to the north at an interchange with FM 3040 (Round Grove Road)/Denton Tap Road. Bus. North of here, SH 121-H runs by many residential areas before meeting I-35E. North of I-35E, the highway runs just south of the city's central business district and turns in a northeast direction. At Main Street, Bus. SH 121-H turns in a more eastern direction and crosses over the Elm Fork Trinity River. The highway continues to run east and meets FM 544 at an intersection before ending at an interchange with SH 121/Sam Rayburn Tollway.

Junction list

County	Location	mi	km	Destinations	Notes
Dallas	Coppell	0.0	0.0	SH 121 / Sam Rayburn Tollway north	Interchange
Denton	Lewisville	1.0	1.6	FM 3040 (Round Grove Road) / Denton Tap Road	Interchange
Denton	Lewisville	3.3	5.3	I-35E (Stemmons Freeway)	I-35E exit 450
Denton	Lewisville	4.5	7.2	Main Street	Former FM 1171
Denton	Lewisville	5.7	9.2	Bridge over the Elm Fork Trinity River	
Denton	Lewisville	7.7	12.4	FM 544 east – Carrollton	
Denton	Lewisville	8.4	13.5	SH 121 / Sam Rayburn Tollway north	Interchange
1.000 mi = 1.609 km; 1.000 km = 0.621 mi

== See also ==
- Chisholm Trail Parkway
- Sam Rayburn Tollway
