= Randolph, Texas =

Unincorporated community in Texas, US

Coordinates: 33°29′02″N 96°15′09″W

Randolph is an unincorporated community in Fannin County, Texas, United States. Randolph has a post office with the ZIP code 75475. This is not to be confused with Randolph in Trinity County.
