= Farm to Market Road 157 =

State road in Ellis, Johnson, and Tarrant counties in Texas, United States

Farm to Market Road 157

Route information
- Maintained by TxDOT
- Length: 40.1 mi (64.5 km)
- Existed: June 4, 1945–present

Major junctions
- South end: FM 66 in Maypearl
- US 67 in Venus; US 287 in Mansfield; Bus. US 287 in Mansfield; I-20 in Arlington; I-30 in Arlington
- North end: SH 121 in Euless

Location
- Country: United States
- State: Texas
- Counties: Ellis, Johnson, Tarrant

Highway system
- Highways in Texas; Interstate; US; State; Former; Toll; Loops; Spurs; FM/RM; Park; Rec
← FM 156	→ FM 158

Farm to Market Road 157 (FM 157) is a Farm to Market Road in Ellis, Johnson, Tarrant counties in Texas, United States, that connects Farm to Market Road 66 (FM 66) in Maypearl; with Texas State Highway 121 (SH 121) in Euless.

The highway’s northern terminus is at an interchange with SH 121 in Euless. The route passes directly through the center of Euless as Industrial Boulevard, passing large neighborhoods and businesses. Sections of Industrial Boulevard also enter Bedford city limits. It continues south toward Arlington passing through a large wetland in far eastern Fort Worth, where it is simply designated Highway 157. In Arlington, the route continues on North Collins, Division, and South Cooper Streets directly through downtown Arlington, passing major attractions such as AT&T Stadium and Globe Life Field. The route passes through the grounds of the University of Texas at Arlington, and continues through downtown and southern Arlington, before entering Mansfield. The route continues through central Mansfield, and south to Maypearl. In Mansfield, the road is known as Main Street and Lone Star Road; in Venus as Main, 8th & 7th Streets; and in Maypearl as Highway 157. The Texas Department of Transportation (TxDOT) designated the route in 1945.

== Route description ==
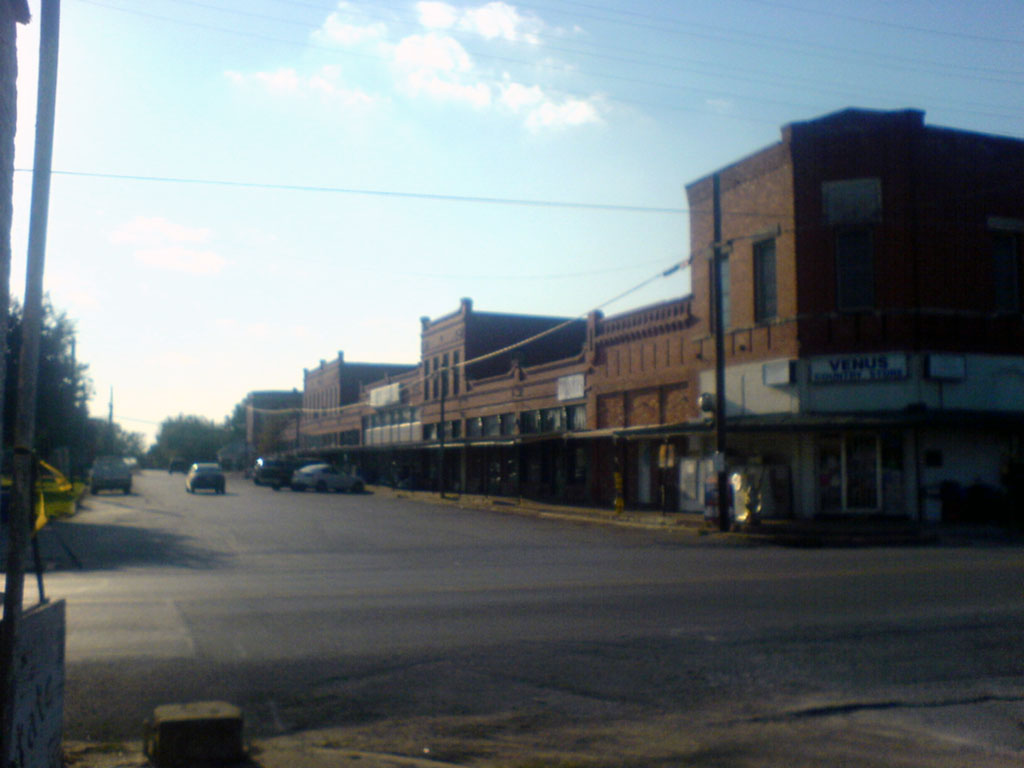
Downtown Venus, with FM 157 in the foreground

FM 157 begins at its southern terminus, a three-way intersection with Farm to Market Road 66, in Maypearl. The highway starts off as a two-lane, paved, asphalt road. After the intersection, the road continues through northern Maypearl, passing several rows of houses and small businesses. Just after exiting the town, the route passes the large Maypearl Cemetery. The route continues through rural farmland, intersecting several small county roads along the way. At an intersection with Farm to Market Road 1446, the road passes a group of houses and farms. For this length of the route, FM 157 is heading almost due northwest. A few miles after the intersection with FM 1446, the highway turns west and continues for about half a mile in that direction. The road then turns northwest again, and passes the large community of Country Acres.

The route continues on through miles of open farmland, intersecting with FM 2258 and FM 875, as well as smaller roads. FM 157 then enters Venus. When the road enters Venus, the name changes from Farm Road 157 to 7th Street. Just after entering the town, the route turns west and is renamed 8th street. The highway spends a very short period of time traveling west, before turning northeast again, and becoming Main Street. The highway passes the Venus Post Office, and proceeds through "downtown Venus", passing most of the town's businesses. FM 157 proceeds to pass over three railroad tracks. The route intersects with US Highway 67, and then exits Venus.

The highway passes several large farms, before passing through a very large, unnamed, unincorporated community, and continuing towards Mansfield. The highway enters southern Mansfield, and intersects Business US 287, and becomes concurrent with the highway. After a few miles of passing several streets, FM 157 splits off of Business US 287 heading due north. heading to Arlington, it has an interchange with US 287, intersects Turner Warnell Road at the border of Mansfield and Arlington, becoming South Cooper Street. Several miles after crossing US 287, It intersects Interstate 20 near The Parks Mall at Arlington. After interchanging with I-20, The highway slants toward the northeast for about 2.5 miles before reaching Pioneer Parkway (Spur 303). As it intersects Spur 303, FM 157 turns back to the north for another 2 miles before intersecting Division Street (SH 180). Just before the SH 180 interchange, FM 157 runs through the University of Texas at Arlington. At the SH 180 interchange, FM 157 merges with Highway 180 now running east with the state highway. FM 157 and SH 180 both run concurrently for roughly 1 mile. FM 157 splits off of SH 180 and heads north onto North Collins Street. Passing the AT&T Stadium and having an interchange with Interstate 30, it goes for a few miles, passing Viridian and The Arlington City Landfill. After that, it becomes Highway 157 after the crossing of the Fort Worth border. It continues on as Highway 157 for a few miles before passing the Euless border, becoming Industrial Boulevard, intersecting Euless Blvd. (SH 10), having an interchange with SH 183 (Airport Freeway), crossing the Bedford border, spends its last 2 miles through suburbs before merging onto its northern terminus with a partial interchange on SH 121.

== History ==
FM 157 was first designated on June 4, 1945, and traveled from, a junction with US 287 in Mansfield, in Johnson County, northward to the intersection of SH 121 (Ira E. Woods Avenue) and Loop 10 (Dallas Road) in Grapevine, in Tarrant County. Seven days later, on June 11, 1945, the highway was extended from US 287 through Venus and southward to the southern border of Ellis County. The route was extended on October 25, 1955, to a junction with FM 66 in Maypearl, adding approximately 8.8 miles (14.2 km) to the overall length. On April 14, 1980, the northern 0.6 miles (0.97 km) of the route was returned to the city of Grapevine. The next 3.9 miles (6.3 km) south of that was redesignated as part of State Highway 121 (SH 121) in the same order.

On June 27, 1995, the stretch of the highway traveling from SH 121 south to US 287 was redesignated as UR 157, approximately 17.3 miles (27.8 km). The remaining 22.7 miles (36.5 km) of the route stayed FM 157. On June 26, 2003, a portion of the route was redesignated from Collins Street to Cooper Street, in Arlington. On April 30, 2015, the section concurrent with BU 287-P from FM 917 to the oldFM 157/BU 287-P junction was removed from the state highway system and given to the city of Mansfield, so FM 157 was rerouted along southbound BU 287-P. The portion from US 287 south to BU 287-P was transferred to BU-287-P, and the section along BU 287-P from FM 917 to FM 157 was transferred to FM 917. On July 27, 2017, FM 157 replaced the section of FM 917 south to US 287, and follows US 287 between these areas. On November 15, 2018, the section from SH 121 south to US 287 was redesignated as FM 157 again.

== Future ==
In 2012, TxDOT began discussions for a project for the rerouting of FM 157 from FM 1807 south of Venus north to US 287 in Mansfield. The project would potentially reroute the highway to a more direct path, and take it through several large neighborhoods. The Fort Worth District is currently conducting a feasibility study for the proposed realignment of FM 157 from FM 917 to FM 1807.

== Major junctions ==
County	Location	mi	km	Destinations	Notes
Ellis	Maypearl	0.0	0.0	FM 66 – Itasca, Waxahachie	Southern terminus
Ellis		1.0	1.6	FM 1446 east (Old Buena Vista Road) – Waxahachie	Western terminus of FM 1446
Ellis		5.7	9.2	FM 2258	
Ellis		7.7	12.4	FM 875 east	Western terminus of FM 875
Ellis		8.6	13.8	FM 1807 west – Alvarado	Eastern terminus of FM 1807
Johnson	Venus	10.7	17.2	US 67 – Cleburne, Midlothian	
Johnson	Mansfield	19.5	31.4	FM 917 north – Mansfield	South end of FM 917 overlap
Johnson	Mansfield	19.6	31.5	US 287 south – Midlothian	Interchange; north end of FM 917 overlap; south end of US 287 overlap
Tarrant	Mansfield	21.0	33.8	Heritage Parkway	Interchange; south end of freeway
Tarrant	Mansfield	22.0	35.4	East Broad Street	Access to Methodist Mansfield Medical Center
Tarrant	Mansfield	23.3	37.5	Walnut Creek Drive / Debbie Lane	
Tarrant	Mansfield	24.7	39.8	US 287 north – Fort Worth Bus. US 287 south	Interchange; north end of freeway; north end of US 287 overlap; northern terminus of Bus. US 287
Tarrant	Arlington	30.2	48.6	I-20 (Ronald Reagan Memorial Freeway) – Fort Worth, Dallas	Cloverleaf interchange exit; I-20 exits 449 A-B
Tarrant	Arlington	32.8	52.8	Spur 303 (Pioneer Parkway)	
Tarrant	Arlington	34.9	56.2	SH 180 west (Division Street)	South end of SH 180 overlap; former US 80
Tarrant	Arlington	35.9	57.8	SH 180 east (Division Street)	North end of SH 180 overlap; former US 80
Tarrant	Arlington	37.3	60.0	I-30 (Tom Landry Freeway)	No westbound entrance; I-30 exits 27B-28B
Tarrant	Euless	42.2	67.9	SH 10 (Euless Boulevard)	
Tarrant	Euless	42.8	68.9	SH 183 (Airport Freeway) to SH 183 Express	FM 157 southbound lanes enter Bedford, recent road and pavement renovations by interchange
Tarrant	Euless	45.1	72.6	SH 121 (William D. Tate Avenue)	Northern terminus; interchange; no northbound exit
1.000 mi = 1.609 km; 1.000 km = 0.621 mi: Concurrency terminus; Incomplete access

== See also ==
- List of Farm to Market Roads in Texas
