= Interstate 35W (Texas) =

Highway in Texas

Interstate 35W
- I-35W highlighted in red

Route information
- Maintained by TxDOT
- Length: 85.203 mi (137.121 km)
- Existed: 1959–present
- NHS: Entire route

Major junctions
- South end: I-35 / I-35E / US 77 near Hillsboro
- US 67 in Alvarado; I-20 in Fort Worth; I-30 in Fort Worth; US 287 in Fort Worth; US 377 in Fort Worth; I-820 in Fort Worth; US 81 / US 287 in Fort Worth
- North end: I-35 / I-35E / US 77 in Denton

Location
- Country: United States
- State: Texas
- Counties: Hill, Johnson, Tarrant, Denton

Highway system
- Interstate Highway System; Main; Auxiliary; Suffixed; Business; Future; Highways in Texas; Interstate; US; State; Former; Toll; Loops; Spurs; FM/RM; Park; Rec
← I-35E	→ SH 35

Interstate 35W (I-35W (Note: Some sources use "IH-35W", as "IH" is an abbreviation used by the Texas Department of Transportation for Interstate Highways.)), a north–south Interstate Highway, is the western half of I-35 where it splits to serve the Dallas–Fort Worth metropolitan area. I-35 splits into two branch routes, I-35W and I-35E, at Hillsboro. I-35W runs north for 85.2 miles (137.1 km), carrying its own separate sequence of exit numbers. It runs through Fort Worth before rejoining with I-35E to reform I-35 in Denton. It is the more direct route for long-distance expressway traffic, as is noted on signs on I-35 leading into the I-35W/I-35E splits. During the 1970s, billboards existed on I-35 encouraging travelers to take the faster and shorter I-35W route.

During the early years of the Interstate Highway System, branching Interstates with directional suffixes, such as N, S, E, and W, were common nationwide. On every other Interstate nationwide, these directional suffixes have been phased out by redesignating the suffixed route numbers with a loop or spur route number designation (such as I-270 in Maryland, which was once I-70S) or, in some cases, were assigned a different route number (such as I-76, which was once I-80S). In the case of I-35 in the Dallas–Fort Worth area, since neither branch is clearly the main route and both branches return to a unified Interstate beyond the cities of Dallas and Fort Worth, officials at the American Association of State Highway and Transportation Officials (AASHTO) have allowed the suffixes of E and W in Texas to remain in the present day. I-35 also splits into I-35E and I-35W in Minneapolis–Saint Paul, Minnesota, for similar reasons as the I-35 split in the Dallas–Fort Worth area.

== Route description ==
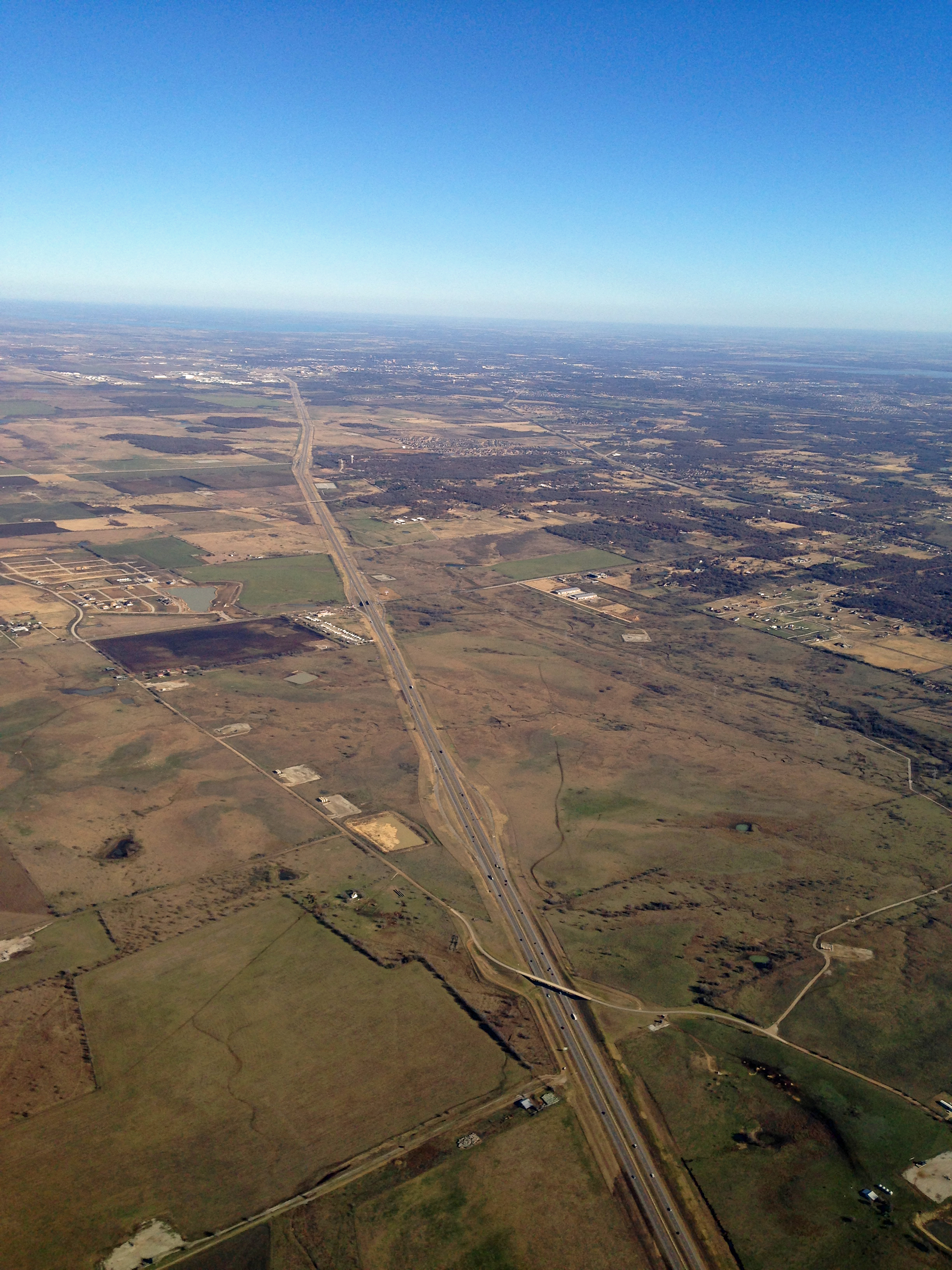
Aerial view of I-35W looking toward Denton

I-35 splits into two separately named Interstate Highways just north of Hillsboro, Texas. The routes fork to the northwest and northeast, with I-35W taking the northwest route and I-35E traveling off to the northeast toward Dallas. I-35W travels northwest past the Hillsboro airport through generally rolling farm and ranchlands. It then intersects with U.S. Highway 67 (US 67, East Henderson Street) on the west side of Alvarado. It continues northwest into the southern edge of Fort Worth. At an intersection with State Highway 174 (SH 174, Northeast Wilshire Boulevard), the route turns due north into greater Fort Worth, passing just west of Fort Worth Spinks Airport. Further north, the road reaches a five-level interchange with I-20. The route continues north, reaching downtown Fort Worth. Here, it reaches intersections with I-30, US 287, and US 377/SH 121 (East Belknap Street). I-35W travels north away from downtown concurrent with US 287, next intersecting I-820 just east of Fort Worth Meacham International Airport. Just north of this intersection, US 287 splits to the northwest, along with the southern terminus of US 81. I-35W then gradually shifts to the northeast, passing Fort Worth Alliance Airport and Texas Motor Speedway. It reaches its northern merging point on the southwest side of Denton, merging back together with I-35E to reform I-35, which continues off to the north. Like the I-35 split in Minneapolis–Saint Paul, Minnesota, I-35W uses its own exit numbers and mileposts, while I-35E continues those along I-35 between the city of Laredo and the Oklahoma state line.

== History ==
When first designated, I-35W and I-35E were the only "suffixed" highways in Texas. Subsequently, I-69W, I-69E, and I-69C have been designated.

In May 2014, construction began to build two-lane express lanes from the US 287/SH 280 interchange to North Tarrant Parkway. In August 2018, construction was completed.

On the morning of February 11, 2021, a 133-car pileup occurred in Fort Worth due to cold and icy weather. The pileup, among the worst in American history, killed six people and injured 95 more. The crash occurred north of downtown Fort Worth and spanned 0.5 miles (0.80 km) between SH 183 (Northeast 28th Street) and Northside Drive. The elevated nature of this stretch of highway exacerbated the collision because elevated roadways can be exposed to freezing air from above and below, increasing the chances for ice to form on the roadway. The area had experienced 36 hours of freezing rain before the collision, and workers had pretreated the roadway with brine, but this did not prevent the disaster.

== Exit list ==
County	Location	mi	km	Exit	Destinations	Notes
Hill		0.0	0.0		I-35 south – Waco	I-35W south and I-35E merge into I-35
Hill		0.4	0.64	370	US 77 north / Spur 579 – Hillsboro	Southbound exit only; exit number based on I-35 mileage
Hill		0.5	0.80		I-35E north – Dallas	Northbound entrance only; I-35E exit 370B
Hill		3.0	4.8	3	FM 2959 – Airport	
Hill		6.9	11.1	7	FM 934	
Hill	Itasca	8.0	12.9	8	FM 66 – Itasca	
Hill		12.5	20.1	12	FM 67 – Covington	
Johnson	Grandview	15.5	24.9	15	FM 916 – Grandview, Maypearl	
Johnson	Grandview	16.6	26.7	16	SH 81 south / County Road 201 – Grandview	
Johnson		17.4	28.0	17	FM 2258	
Johnson		21.4	34.4	21	County Road 107	
Johnson	Alvarado	24.3	39.1	24	I-35 BL north / FM 1706 / FM 3136 – Alvarado	
Johnson	Alvarado	25.9	41.7	26A	US 67 – Cleburne, Dallas	
Johnson	Alvarado	26.9	43.3	—	I-35 BL south – Alvarado	Former southbound exit signed as exit 26B; now northbound entrance only
Johnson		27.2	43.8	26B-27	County Road 707 / County Road 604	Northbound exit signed as exit 26B, southbound exit signed as exit 27
Johnson	Burleson	30.2	48.6	30	FM 917 – Joshua, Mansfield	
Johnson	Burleson	31.9	51.3	32	Bethesda Road	
Johnson	Burleson	34.5	55.5	35	Briaroaks Road / Hidden Creek Parkway	no direct northbound exit (signed at exit 32)
Johnson	Burleson	36.7	59.1	36	FM 3391 (Renfro Street) / Hidden Creek Parkway	former Spur 50
Johnson–Tarrant county line	Burleson	37.7	60.7	37	SH 174 south (Wilshire Boulevard) – Cleburne	No direct northbound exit (signed at exit 36)
Tarrant	Burleson	37.9	61.0	38	Alsbury Boulevard / McAlister Road	
Tarrant	Fort Worth	38.5	62.0	39	FM 1187 (Rendon-Crowley Road) / McAlister Road	Access to Huguley Memorial Medical Center
Tarrant	Fort Worth	40.2	64.7	40	Garden Acres Drive	
Tarrant	Fort Worth	41.3	66.5	41	Risinger Road	
Tarrant	Fort Worth	42.2	67.9	42	Everman Parkway	
Tarrant	Fort Worth	43.3	69.7	43	Sycamore School Road	no direct northbound exit (signed at exit 42)
Tarrant	Fort Worth	44.2	71.1	44	Altamesa Boulevard	Northbound exit and southbound entrance
Tarrant	Fort Worth	44.8	72.1	45	I-20 – Abilene, Dallas	Signed as exits 45A (west) and 45B (east); I-20 exit 437
Tarrant	Fort Worth	45.6	73.4	46A	Felix Street	no direct northbound exit (signed at exit 44)
Tarrant	Fort Worth	46.0	74.0	46B	Seminary Drive	
Tarrant	Fort Worth	47.0	75.6	47	Ripy Street	
Tarrant	Fort Worth	47.6	76.6	48A	Berry Street – TCU	
Tarrant	Fort Worth	48.6	78.2	48B	Morningside Drive	Southbound exit and northbound entrance
Tarrant	Fort Worth	48.8	78.5	49A	Allen Avenue	no direct southbound exit (signed at exit 49B)
Tarrant	Fort Worth	49.4	79.5	49B	Bus. US 287 (Rosedale Street)	Access to John Peter Smith Hospital
Tarrant	Fort Worth	50.3	81.0	51	I-30 / US 287 south / US 377 south / SH 180 east (Lancaster Avenue) – Abilene, Dallas, Downtown Fort Worth	South end of US 287 / US 377 overlap; signed as exits 51A (I-30 west / US 377 south), 51B (SH 180 east), and 51C (I-30 east) northbound; no access from I-35W north to US 287 south or US 287 north to I-35E south; I-30 exit 15
Tarrant	Fort Worth	51.4	82.7	52A	Spur 280 – Downtown Fort Worth	Access to Fort Worth Central Station
Tarrant	Fort Worth	52.0	83.7	52B	US 377 north (Belknap Street) / SH 121 north – D/FW Airport	North end of US 377 overlap
Tarrant	Fort Worth	52.2	84.0	52C	Spur 347 west (Belknap Street)	No northbound exit
Tarrant	Fort Worth	52.3	84.2	52D	Pharr Street	
Tarrant	Fort Worth	52.6	84.7	52E	Carver Avenue	Northbound exit and southbound entrance; access to Fort Worth Central Station
Tarrant	Fort Worth	53.1	85.5	53	Northside Drive / Yucca Avenue	
Tarrant	Fort Worth	54.0	86.9	54A	SH 183 (28th Street)	
Tarrant	Fort Worth	54.9	88.4	54B	Papurt Street	Former southbound exit and northbound entrance
Tarrant	Fort Worth	54.6	87.9	54C	33rd Street / Long Avenue	Former northbound exit and southbound entrance
Tarrant	Fort Worth			55	Frontage Road	Southbound exit and entrance
Tarrant	Fort Worth	55.5	89.3	56A	Meacham Boulevard	
Tarrant	Fort Worth	56.6	91.1	56B	Beach Street	Northbound exit only
Tarrant	Fort Worth	56.4	90.8	—	I-820 Express east	
Tarrant	Fort Worth	57.2	92.1	57A	I-820	Signed as exit 57 southbound; I-820 exit 16
Tarrant	Fort Worth			57B	Fossil Creek Boulevard	Northbound exit only
Tarrant	Fort Worth	58.3	93.8	58	Western Center Boulevard	
Tarrant	Fort Worth	58.9	94.8	59	Basswood Boulevard	
Tarrant	Fort Worth	60.0	96.6	60	US 81 north / US 287 north – Decatur, Wichita Falls	North end of US 287 overlap; no northbound entrance
Tarrant	Fort Worth	61.1	98.3	61	North Tarrant Parkway	no direct southbound exit (signed at exit 63)
Tarrant	Fort Worth	61.9	99.6	63	Heritage Trace Parkway	
Tarrant	Fort Worth	63.7	102.5	64	Golden Triangle Boulevard / Keller-Hicks Road	Access to Texas Health Harris Methodist Hospital Alliance
Tarrant	Fort Worth	65.3	105.1	65	SH 170 east / Alliance Gateway / Haslet Parkway	Signed as exits 65A (Alliance Gateway / Haslet Parkway) and 65B (SH 170) northbound
Tarrant	Fort Worth	66.3	106.7	66	Westport Parkway	
Tarrant–Denton county line	Fort Worth	67.3	108.3	67	Alliance Boulevard	
Denton	Fort Worth	68.4	110.1	68	Eagle Parkway	
Denton	Fort Worth–Northlake line	70.4	113.3	70	SH 114 – Dallas, Bridgeport, DFW Airport	
Denton	Fort Worth–Northlake line	71.2	114.6	72	Dale Earnhardt Way	
Denton	Northlake	73.8	118.8	74	FM 1171 – Flower Mound, Lewisville	
Denton	Argyle	76.6	123.3	76	FM 407 – Argyle, Justin	
Denton	Argyle–Denton line	78.9	127.0	79	Crawford Road / Robson Ranch Road	
Denton	Denton	82.0	132.0	82	FM 2449 – Ponder	
Denton	Denton	83.0	133.6	83	Loop 288 north (Southeast Loop 288)	Proposed; future southern terminus of Loop 288
Denton	Denton	84.8	136.5	84	FM 1515 (Bonnie Brae Street) – Airport	Northbound exit and southbound entrance
Denton	Denton	85.0	136.8	85A	I-35E south – Dallas	Northbound exit and southbound entrance; I-35E exit 467
Denton	Denton	85.1	137.0	85B	West Oak Street	Northbound exit and southbound entrance, access to Texas Health Presbyterian Hospital Denton
Denton	Denton	85.2	137.1		I-35 north – Oklahoma City	I-35 exit 467; I-35W north and I-35E merge into I-35
1.000 mi = 1.609 km; 1.000 km = 0.621 mi: Closed/former; Concurrency terminus; Electronic toll collection; Incomplete access; Proposed; Route transition
