= North Tarrant Express =

North Tarrant Express
- North Tarrant Express highlighted in red

Route information
- Maintained by NTE Mobility Partners
- Length: 13.5 mi (21.7 km)
- Existed: 2010–present

Major junctions
- West end: I-35W in Fort Worth
- I-820 in Fort Worth, Haltom City, and North Richland Hills
- East end: SH 183 / SH 121 in Fort Worth

Location
- Country: United States
- State: Texas

Highway system
- Highways in Texas; Interstate; US; State; Former; Toll; Loops; Spurs; FM/RM; Park; Rec

The North Tarrant Express (NTE) project is a total highway reconstruction of the Interstate 820 (I-820) and State Highway 121/State Highway 183 (SH 121/SH 183, Airport Freeway) corridor between I-35W and Industrial Boulevard in Northeast Tarrant County, Texas. The NTE and the Texas Department of Transportation (TxDOT) anticipate the new highway system will relieve traffic congestion, improve safety on its roadways and have integrated plans for the anticipated traffic growth in one of the country’s fastest developing regions. When the improvements are completed, the $2.5 billion North Tarrant Express will have upgraded main highway lanes, continuous frontage roads, and 13.3 miles (21.4 km) of newly added tolled managed lanes (TEXpress Lanes).

Construction began in late 2010 and was scheduled to be completed before the end of 2014, at least six months ahead of schedule.

Also included in the North Tarrant Express' scope is the 10 miles (16 km) of I-35W from north of I-30 (Downtown Fort Worth) to the I-820 interchange. The project will provide over $1.5 billion of needed infrastructure to the Fort Worth area.

The NTE project is completely reconstructing and upgrading existing general highway lanes. It is also improving and expanding frontage lanes to double the existing capacity. Moreover, adding TEXpress managed lanes, or tolled express lanes, is designed for commuters seeking the most reliable and time-saving trip. The variable tolls are based on travel time with a minimum goal to maintain a 50 mph traffic flow on the highway; motorists can choose to use general highway lanes or tolled express lanes depending on their traveling objectives.

== History ==
A study by the free-market Reason Foundation in 2009 that focused on 11 metro areas, showed that North Texas would have a huge economic boost by alleviating traffic congestion, calculating the extra productivity from better movement of people and goods around the region. Wise infrastructure investments that eliminate gridlock and produce free-flowing road conditions will more than pay for themselves by boosting the region’s economy, and thus tax revenues to maintain the mobility.

The Dallas–Fort Worth metroplex (DFW) was singled out in the study due to its poor showing in congestion indexes and ranked poorly in many indexes in the annual mobility study by the Texas Transportation Institute. The Reason study says the biggest economic gains would come from eliminating severe congestion, which could add $46 billion a year to the regional economy and over $3 billion in annual tax revenues. Dallas is the fourth fastest-growing city in the country.

For the 150,000+ cars a day that travel through the I-820 and SH 121/SR 183 corridor, drivers are no stranger to some of the bottlenecks that cause these delays. As one of the region's most important corridors, this stretch of highway has not kept up with the growth and North Texas' nearly seven million residents. Dallas/Fort Worth commuters spend an average of two days a year stuck in traffic—the fifth-highest in the nation.

On January 29, 2009, the Texas Transportation Commission voted 5–0 to hire Cintra's NTE Mobility Partners to rebuild phase 1 of North Tarrant Express corridors.

== Route description ==
=== NTE Project (1 & 2W) ===
On June 23, 2009, TxDOT awarded a comprehensive development agreement (CDA) for the North Tarrant Express project to NTE Mobility Partners. This concessions includes the design, development, construction, finance, maintenance, and operation of Segment 1 (West) and Segment 2 (East) for the duration of 52 years.

==== West Segment ====
The West Segment (I-820) is 6.4 miles (10.3 km) in length and runs from I-35W on the west to the North East Mall interchange on the east across three cities (Fort Worth, Haltom City and North Richland Hills). This segment includes 9 cross-street bridges and 21 on-ramps/off-ramps.

==== East Segment ====
The East Segment (SH 121/SR 183) is 6.9 miles (11.1 km) in length and runs from the North East Mall interchange on the west to Industrial Boulevard in the east, across four cities (North Richland Hills, Hurst, Bedford and Euless). This segment includes 9 cross-street bridges and 31 on- or off-ramps).

=== I-35W Project ===
A construction agreement with TxDOT has initiated construction on Segments 3A (I-35W from downtown Fort Worth) & 3B (I-35W from I-30 to U.S. 287). Segment 3A has an expected completion date in 2018 and 3B in 2017. The I-35W project is the next part of the North Tarrant Express. It is divided into three segments:

- Segment 3A is 6.5 miles (10.5 km) of I-35W from north of I-30 to north of I-820 and includes the I-35W/I-820 interchange. Constructed by NTE Mobility Partners Segments 3, LLC (NTEMP3).
- Segment 3B is 3.6 miles (5.8 km) of I-35W from north of I-820 to US 81/US 287. Constructed by TxDOT.
- Segment 3C is from US 81 and 287 to Eagle Parkway. Construction began in September 2020. The public-private project will rebuild 6.7 miles of I-35W and add four TEXpress Lanes, auxiliary lanes and some frontage roads. Anticipated substantial completion is late 2023.

== Partners ==
The North Tarrant Express is a collaboration of private and public partners (P3 or PPP), including TxDOT and the North Central Texas Council of Governments (NCTCOG).

The NTE is being designed, built, financed, operated and maintained by NTE Mobility Partners, which is working in close collaboration with TxDOT and local communities. This important highway project will be wholly owned by TxDOT.

Pursuant to the additional agreement between TxDOT and NTE Mobility Partners Segments 3 LLC (NTEMP3), the developer (NTEMP3) will design, build, operate and maintain segment 3A (35W). TxDOT will build segment 3B (35W), from north of Loop 820 to U.S. 287, and will then turn it over to NTEMP3 who will be responsible for the operations and maintenance. NTEMP3 will also collect tolls generated on the managed toll lanes of the facility until 2061 paying off the PAB's, TIFIA loan, private equity partners and then sharing profits with TxDOT.

== Controversy ==
On Feb. 11, 2021, at least 130 cars and trucks were involved in a pileup on an icy stretch of Interstate 35 operated by NTE. Six people were killed and dozens were injured, in what has been described as one of the deadliest vehicle crashes in Texas history. An investigation by the National Transportation Safety Board found that crash could have been prevented if the private operator had followed basic roadway safety standards. NTE had developed a draft winter storm maintenance plan years before the pileup, but the plan was never implemented.NTE did not install basic technology for monitoring road conditions like sensors that monitor pavement temperature and surface conditions. Despite widely predicted storm conditions, NTE did not add additional workers as the weather deteriorated. NTE crews applied saltwater to the roadway 48 hours before the ice storm but never provided any additional treatments.

== Developer ==
NTE Mobility Partners LLC is a company with three shareholders, including Cintra, a world leader in private-sector development of transportation infrastructure; Meridiam, a global public-private partnership investor/developer of public facilities; and the Dallas Police and Fire Pension System, the first U.S. pension fund in the country to invest in the building and maintenance of a major toll road project like NTE.

== Exit list ==
The entire route is in Tarrant County.

Location	mi	km	Destinations	Notes
Fort Worth			I-820 west to I-35W	
Haltom City			US 377 (Denton Highway)	
North Richland Hills			Iron Horse Boulevard / Meadow Lakes Drive	westbound exit and eastbound entrance
Hurst			I-820 / SH 26 / SH 121 / SH 183 / FM 1938 / Bedford-Euless Road	I-820 exit 23A
Bedford			Brown Trail	westbound exit and eastbound entrance
Bedford			SH 121 north – DFW Airport North Entry	eastbound exit and westbound entrance
Bedford–Euless line			FM 157 (Industrial Boulevard)	eastbound exit and westbound entrance
Bedford–Euless line			SH 183 east – DFW Airport South Entry, Irving	
1.000 mi = 1.609 km; 1.000 km = 0.621 mi: Incomplete access
