= Downtown Fort Worth =

- Central business district
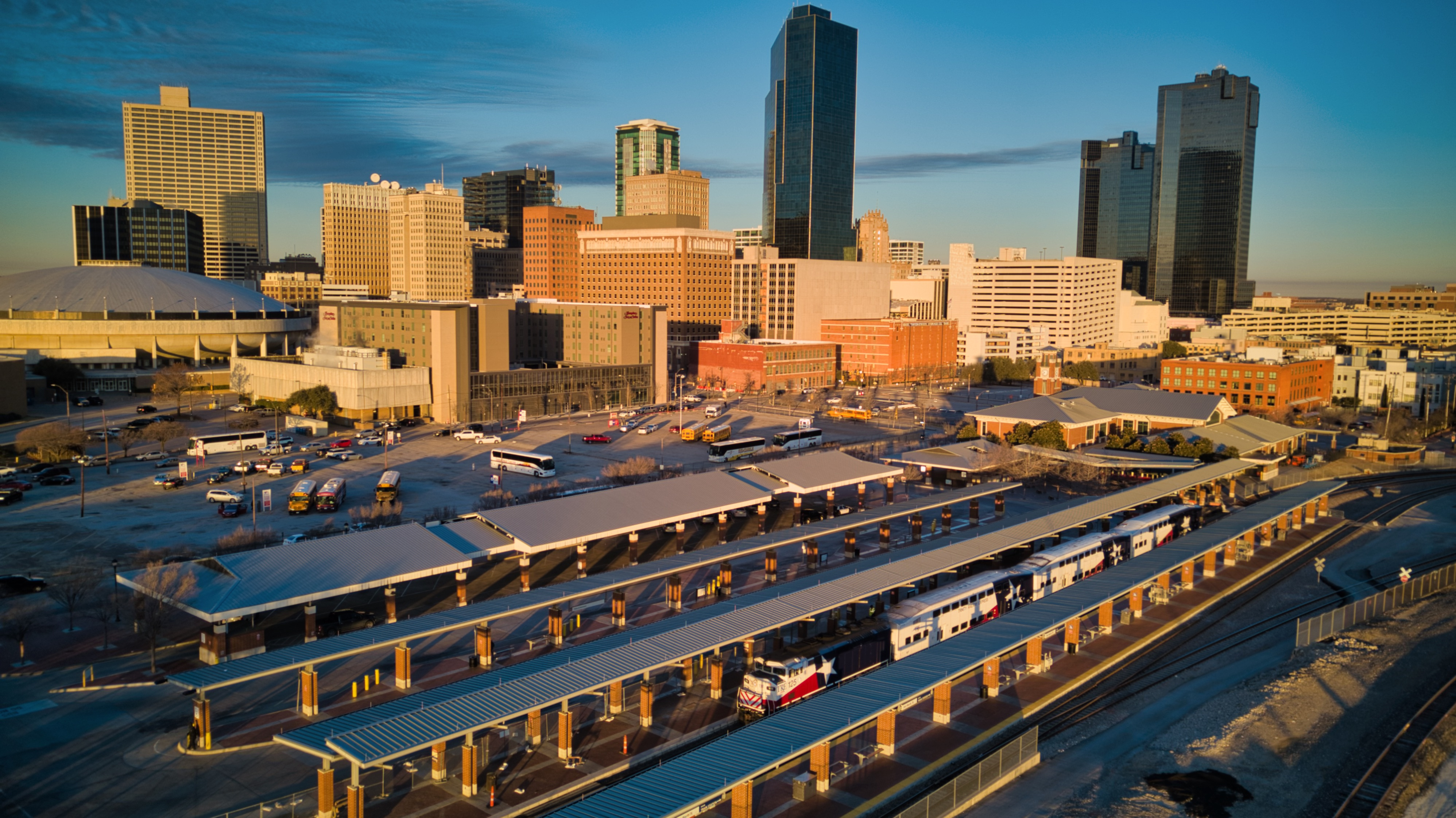
- Downtown Fort Worth Skyline

- Location within Texas
- Coordinates: 32.755°N 97.330°W
- Country: United States
- State: Texas
- County: Tarrant County
- City: Fort Worth
- Website: www.dfwi.org

Downtown Fort Worth is the central business district of Fort Worth, Texas, United States. Most of Fort Worth's tallest buildings and skyscrapers are located downtown.

== Attractions ==
=== Sundance Square ===
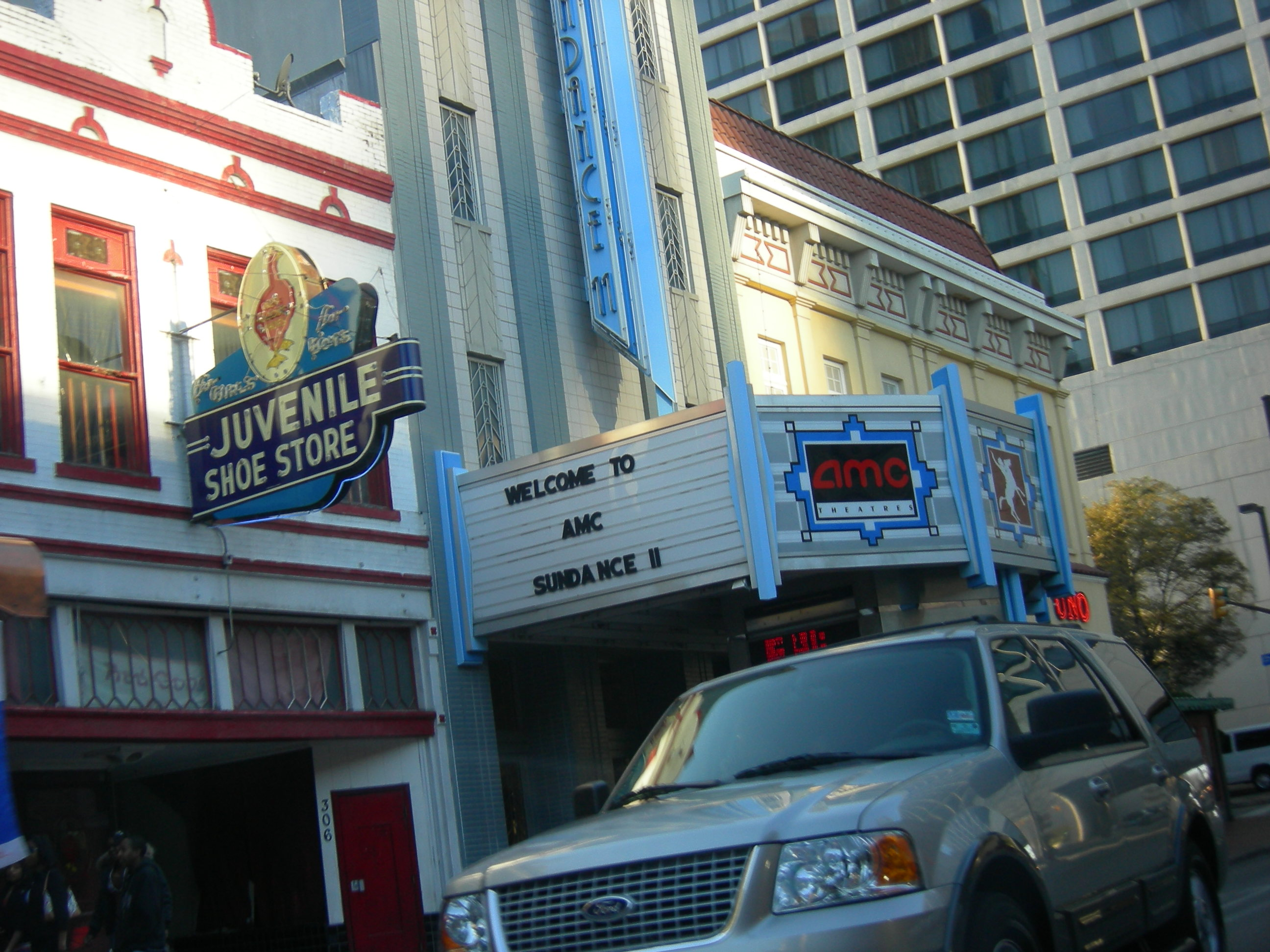
AMC Theatre in Downtown Fort Worth (currently unoccupied)

Sundance Square began as an effort by Sid Bass to revitalize downtown Fort Worth in the early 1980s. At the time, downtown Fort Worth was in decline due to suburbanization. There were many empty gaps between existing skyscrapers and historic buildings that resulted in a pedestrian-unfriendly atmosphere. During many trips to New York City, Bass was fascinated with the urban atmosphere with retail shops, restaurants, office buildings, and museums all working together to form one cohesive experience for the public. He did not want to relocate his business to New York City so he brought a little of New York City to Fort Worth. He employed Thomas E. Woodward, AIA, of Woodward & Taylor Architects, a Dallas architectural firm to design Sundance Square because of his experience with historic structures and commercial buildings. Lewis Faulkner, AIA was the Project Architect and Manager for Woodward & Taylor. Woodward & Taylor placed the Knights of Pythias Building on the U. S. Department of Interior's list of Historic Buildings & Places.

Today, Sundance Square is a pedestrian-friendly cluster of blocks in a portion of downtown Fort Worth that features bars, restaurants, museums, theaters, and retail. It also has offices and residential units. Most buildings in it are either historic or reconstructed, with two modern skyscrapers designed by Paul Rudolph, architect, and a hotel being exceptions. Sidewalks in it are paved with brick. Lewis Faulkner, AIA

=== Parks and plazas ===
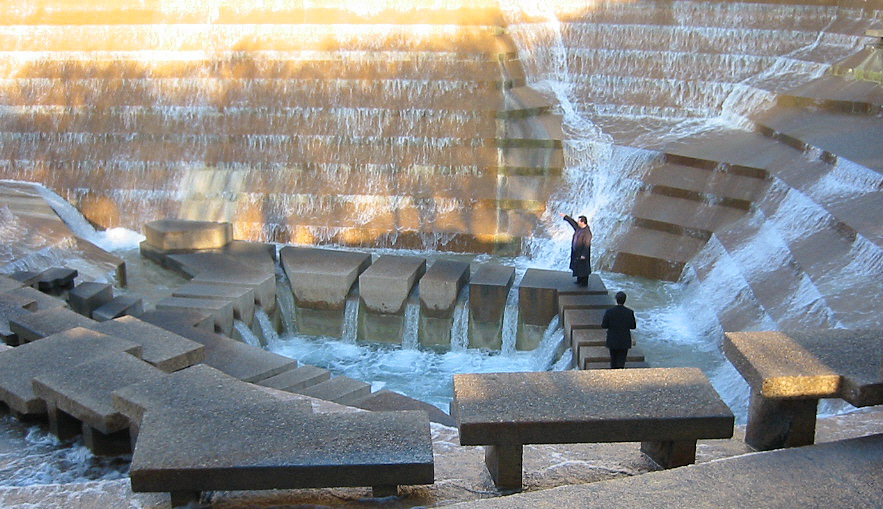
Fort Worth Water Gardens

Sundance Square Plaza is a 55,000 square foot plaza spanning two city blocks within Sundance Square. IT features four large Teflon umbrellas, a permanent stage built into the Westbrook building, jetted fountains that illuminate at night, various other fountains, and a pavilion that can be rented. It is bookended by two office buildings: The Westbrook and The Commerce.

Fort Worth Water Gardens - A 4.3-acre (17,000 m2) contemporary park, designed by architect Philip Johnson, that features three unique pools of water offering a calming and cooling oasis for downtown patrons. It was used in the finale of the 1976 sci-fi film Logan's Run. (In mid-2004 it had to be closed due to several drownings. It reopened after preventive measures had been installed.)

=== Arts and culture ===
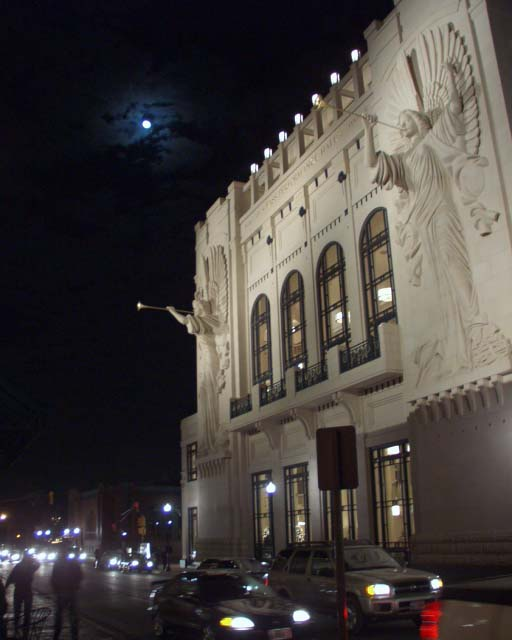
Bass Performance Hall

Bass Performance Hall - Bass Hall is the permanent home to the Fort Worth Symphony Orchestra, Texas Ballet Theater, Fort Worth Opera, and the Van Cliburn International Piano Competition and Cliburn Concerts.

=== Convention Center ===
The Fort Worth Convention Center includes an 11,200 seat multi-purpose arena.

== Notable buildings ==
The Tower, formerly the Bank One Tower, was severely damaged by a F3 tornado on March 28, 2000. It was converted into a residential tower in 2005. Before the redevelopment, it was covered in plywood and metal panels, and considered to be demolished. It now has a new facade and a new top feature that makes it the fourth tallest building in the city.

City Center Development features two twin towers, the 38-story D.R. Horton Tower (1984) and the 33-story Wells Fargo Tower (1982). From the top, they are shaped like pinwheels.

The Hilton Fort Worth opened in 1921 and is where U.S. President John F. Kennedy last stayed before he was assassinated in Dallas.

== Government and infrastructure ==
Fort Worth City Hall is located at 200 Texas Street and was constructed in 1971. The previous building to house those functions in located at 1000 Throckmorton Street and is now known as the A.D. Marshall Public Safety and Courts Building.

The Fort Worth district of the United States Army Corps of Engineers is downtown.

The United States Postal Service operates the Downtown Fort Worth Post Office at 251 West Lancaster Avenue.

The Texas Second Court of Appeals is in the Tim Curry Criminal Justice Center in Downtown Fort Worth.

Tarrant County Courthouse stands at the north end of Main Street. It has been remodeled over the years.

== Economy ==
Downtown Fort Worth is the central business district of the city, and is home to many commercial office buildings, including four office towers over 450 feet tall.

Radio Shack has its headquarters in Downtown Fort Worth. In 2001 Radio Shack bought the former Ripley Arnold public housing complex in Downtown Fort Worth for $20 million. The company razed the complex and had a 900,000 square feet (84,000 m^{2}) corporate headquarters campus built after the City of Fort Worth approved a 30-year economic agreement to ensure that the company stayed in Fort Worth. The company sold the building and, as of 2009, had two years left of a rent-free lease in the building. The company intended to make $66.8 million in the deal with the city. By 2009 it made $4 million; by 2009 the Fort Worth Star-Telegram reported that the company was considering a new site for its headquarters.

Downtown Fort Worth is also home to the headquarters of Pier 1 Imports, XTO Energy, and TPG Capital.

== Transportation ==
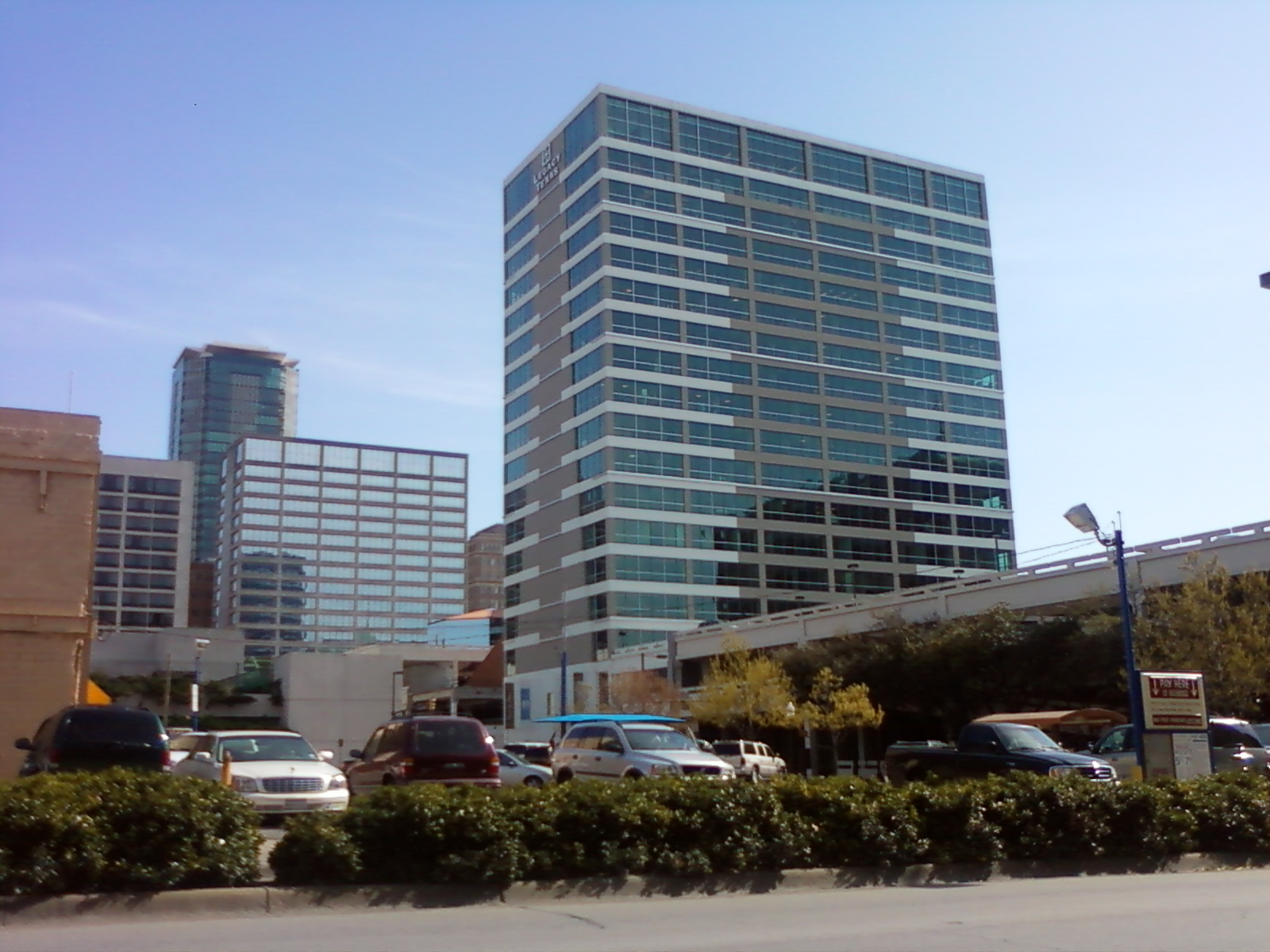
Tandy Center view from Belknap

Downtown Fort Worth is well-served by controlled-access highways, with freeways and parkways converging upon downtown from seven different directions: I-35W from the north and south, I-30 from the east and west, SH 121 from the northeast and southwest, and US 287 from the southeast. Other highways that serve the downtown area include Bus. US 287 (Commerce / Houston Streets), SH 199 (Henderson Street), Spur 280, and Spur 347 (Belknap / Weatherford Streets).

The primary mass transportation hub of Tarrant County is Fort Worth Central Station, located in the eastern portion of downtown at the intersection of Jones Street and 9th Street. About two dozen bus lines operated by Trinity Metro converge at this hub, as well as the Trinity Railway Express and TEXRail commuter rail lines. Bus service from Trinity Metro is free within certain downtown boundaries. The T operates a downtown bus circulator known as Molly The Trolley, which uses a bus designed to look like a historic trolley.

In the future, a 27-mile commuter rail line called TEX Rail will be built from downtown Fort Worth to Grapevine and DFW Airport.

The Tandy Center Subway, based in the Tandy Center (now known as City Place), operated in Fort Worth from 1963 to 2002. The 0.7 mile (1 km) long subway was the only privately operated subway in the United States.

The Trinity Trails is a network of over 35 miles (56 km) of pedestrian trails along the Trinity River branching from downtown.

== Education ==
=== College and Universities ===
The University of Texas at Arlington offers several undergraduate and graduate degree programs in the historic Santa Fe Freight Building downtown.

The Tarrant County College Trinity River campus is located in downtown, along with the Tarrant County College District administrative offices. In 2008 the Tarrant County College District purchased the former Radio Shack headquarters, built only four years earlier in 2004.

The Texas A&M University School of Law campus has been located in downtown at its since 1997. On August 12, 2013, the school and campus were purchased from Texas Wesleyan University by the Texas A&M University System for $73 million. The school is a unit of Texas A&M University in College Station, Texas, with 452 students, as of 2018.

=== Primary and Secondary Schools ===
==== Public ====
The Fort Worth Independent School District provides public education for children who reside downtown, and has one school (Nash Elementary) downtown.

==== Library ====
Fort Worth Library operates the Central Library at 500 West Third Street at Taylor Street. The library opened in 1978, and an expansion was completed in 2000, making it one of the largest public libraries in Tarrant County.

== In popular culture ==
Logan's Run, a 1976 science fiction film directed by Michael Anderson and starring Michael York was shot largely in Fort Worth, including locations such as the Fort Worth Water Gardens. The Water Gardens also appear in another science-fiction film of the period, The Lathe of Heaven (1980).

The interior of St. Patrick Cathedral was filmed for the 1990 comedy film Problem Child.

The exterior of the Tarrant County Courthouse was used frequently in Walker, Texas Ranger.

== Urban neighborhoods surrounding downtown ==
Fort Worth has several other urban neighborhoods in close proximity to the central business district.

=== Stockyards District ===
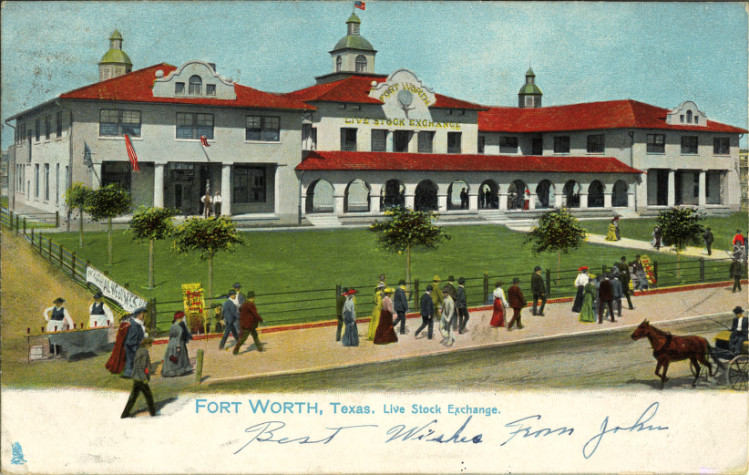
Fort Worth Live Stock Exchange (postcard, c. 1908)

The Fort Worth Stockyards, north of downtown, offers a taste of the old west and the Chisholm Trail at the site of the historic cattle drives and rail access. The district is filled with restaurants, clubs, gift shops, and attractions such as the twice daily Texas Longhorn cattle drives through the streets, historic reenactments, the Stockyards Museum, the Texas Cowboy Hall of Fame, and Billy Bob's, the world's largest country and western music venue.

=== Cultural District ===
The Cultural District is west of the West Seventh District and Downtown, and is home to many Fort Worth museums, such as the Modern Art Museum of Fort Worth, Kimbell Art Museum, Amon Carter Museum of American Art, Fort Worth Museum of Science and History, and National Cowgirl Museum and Hall of Fame, among others. The district is also home to Will Rogers Memorial Center, which hosts the annual Fort Worth Stock Show and Rodeo.

=== West Seventh District ===
"West Seventh" can refer to the gentrifying neighborhood along West 7th Street between the Cultural District and downtown, the mixed-use development within the district, or the street itself. Most gentrification in the West Seventh District has happened south of West 7th Street.

=== Near Southside / Medical District ===
The Near Southside is an urban neighborhood just south of downtown. Many Fort Worth hospitals are in this district, including Baylor All Saints Medical Center, Cook Children's Medical Center, Texas Health Harris Methodist, and JPS Health Network, among others. Most pedestrian activity in the Near Southside takes place along Magnolia Avenue.

=== Texas Christian University ===
Texas Christian University is Fort Worth's most prominent university. The 325-acre campus is southwest of the Near Southside and downtown. Neighborhoods surrounding the university are predominantly made up of historic, single family homes. In recent years, demand for more student housing has resulted in many historic houses being torn down for larger houses designed to accommodate large numbers of students, upsetting many existing residents. Nightlife options and restaurants geared to students can be found along University Drive and Berry Street.

=== Panther Island ===
The Trinity River Vision Authority, Tarrant Regional Water District, City of Fort Worth, Tarrant County, Streams & Valleys Inc, and U.S. Army Corps of Engineers are cooperating in an effort to redevelop Panther Island, an 800-acre area north of downtown along the Trinity River. The first part of the redevelopment plan calls for infrastructure improvements and flood protection. The second part calls for mixed-use development and sustainable growth along the Trinity River, which would result in a vibrant urban neighborhood.

Panther Island is home to several attractions, including Coyote Urban Drive-In Movie Theater, Panther Island Pavilion, and LaGrave Field (former home of the Fort Worth Cats and Fort Worth Vaqueros FC).
