= Sunnyvale High School =

Location
- 222 N. Collins Road; Sunnyvale, Texas 75182; United States; 32.79893°N 96.55943°W

Information
- School type: Public high school
- Motto: Strive. Honor. Serve.
- Established: 2007
- School district: Sunnyvale Independent School District
- Principal: Dr. Ashlee Graham
- Teaching staff: 49.72 (FTE)
- Grades: 9-12
- Enrollment: 733 (2023-2024)
- Student to teacher ratio: 14.74
- Colors: Blue & Gold
- Athletics conference: UIL Class AAAA (4A)
- Mascot: Raider
- Newspaper: The Sentinel
- Yearbook: The Raider
- Website: www.sunnyvaleisd.com/o/shs

Sunnyvale High School is a 4A high school located in Sunnyvale, Texas, United States. It is part of the Sunnyvale Independent School District located in eastern Dallas County. In 2011, the school was rated "Exemplary" by the Texas Education Agency.

== History ==
Schools in the communities of New Hope, Tripp, Hattersville, and Long Creek merged on February 26, 1953, to form the Town of Sunnyvale. These four towns merged to create Sunnyvale School for students in grades kindergarten through eighth grade. Students, at this time, attended high school in the Mesquite Independent School District. North Mesquite High School was the designated high school.

On May 12, 2007, Sunnyvale ISD residents approved a $25 million bond by a narrow 53% margin for the creation of a high school in Sunnyvale. For the 2007–2008 school year, ninth grade students were housed at the Sunnyvale Middle School campus, as were ninth and tenth graders for the 2008–2009 school year. Construction of Sunnyvale High School began in spring 2008, and the building was completed in 2009. The 2009–2010 school year was the first year that students attended the actual SHS campus.

The high school added a grade a year with the class of 2011 being the first class to graduate from Sunnyvale High School, and the class of 2013 was the first class to have attended all four years on the school's campus. The graduating class of 2014 was the first class to have gone all eight years through the new Middle School and High School.

== Athletics ==
The Sunnyvale Raiders compete in the following sports:

Cross Country, Volleyball, Football, Basketball, Soccer, Swimming, Powerlifting, Golf, Tennis, Track, Softball & Baseball.

=== State Titles ===
- Baseball
  - 2014 (2A)
- Girls Basketball
  - 2015 (3A)
- Girls Track & Field
  - 2016 (3A)
- Volleyball
  - 2026 (4A/D2)
