= History of Dallas (through 1838) =

The history of Dallas, Texas, United States, through 1838 concerns the area's prehistory and the exploration that led to the area's settlement and Dallas' subsequent establishment.

== Prehistory ==
People have lived along the forks of the Trinity River for thousands of years. Archaeologists divide the region's later prehistory into a Woodland period and two Late Prehistoric phases, roughly A.D. 750–1250 and 1250–1700. The bow and arrow arrived at the start of the first phase; by the second, the local pottery and arrow points had come to resemble those of the Southern Plains.

The people of the Trinity forks were not a single group. Those on the Elm Fork, where Dallas now stands, had closer ties to the Plains cultures to the west. Those on the East Fork, in what are now Collin, Rockwall and northeastern Dallas counties, formed a distinct local culture that traded with both the Plains peoples and the Caddo of East Texas; Caddo pottery, New Mexican obsidian and turquoise, and shell beads turn up in their burials as prestige goods. They lived mainly on deer and turtle, with little or no maize, and after about 1300 made seasonal bison hunts to the west.

The Late Prehistoric settlements were abandoned around 1600, before any European goods reached them. Drought, and disease spreading ahead of Spanish contact, are the likely causes.

== European contact ==
By the time of European contact the Anadarko, a Caddoan people, lived in villages along the Trinity in what is now Dallas County. The first Europeans to reach the area were probably members of the Moscoso expedition, the survivors of Hernando de Soto's expedition, who passed through the northeastern corner of the future county in 1542. French explorers and traders were active in the vicinity during the eighteenth century, and in 1760 the Spanish missionary José Francisco Calahorra y Sáenz traveled from Nacogdoches to make treaties with the Indian groups of the region.

== New Spain ==
Flag of New Spain, the province of Spain in which Dallas was included

Texas, including the Dallas area, was claimed as part of the Spanish Province of New Spain in the 16th century. The area was considerably proximate to French territory, but ambiguity was cleared in 1819 when the Adams-Onís Treaty made the Red River the northern boundary of New Spain.

Around 1819 or 1820 a band of Cherokee under Chief Bowl—some sixty warriors and their families—arrived from Arkansas. After three years of fighting with the prairie tribes, in which they lost about a third of their warriors, the Cherokees withdrew from the area.

== Athanase de Mézières ==
Another European who probably visited the Dallas area was Athanase de Mézières in 1778. De Mézières, a Frenchman then in the service of the King of Spain, probably crossed the West Fork of the Trinity River near present-day Fort Worth, having followed the western edge of the Eastern Cross Timbers from the Tawakoni Village on the Brazos River near present Waco. He then proceeded north to the Red River. He wrote:

It is worthy to note that from the Brazos River on which the Tuacanas are established, and until one reaches the river which bathes the village of the Taovayzes (Red River), one sees on the right a forest that the natives appropriately call the Grand Forest. ...it is very dense, but not very wide. It seems to be there as a guide to even the most inexperienced, and to give refuge in this dangerous region to those who, few in number and lacking in courage, wish to go from one village to another. -De Mezieres

De Mézières' biographer, Bolton, was convinced de Mézières was describing the Eastern Cross Timbers and the route would have him crossing the West Fork of the Trinity River between the present Fort Worth and Arlington.

== Republic of Texas ==
Present-day Dallas remained under Spanish rule until 1821 when Mexico declared independence from Spain. The land that would become Dallas became part of the state of Coahuila y Tejas in the new nation. The Republic of Texas broke off from Mexico in 1836 and remained an independent country for nearly 10 years. Until 1846 the land east of the Trinity fell within Nacogdoches County and the land west of it within Robertson County.

In 1837 a Republic of Texas expedition under Lieutenant A. B. Van Benthuysen camped on Turtle Creek after an engagement with Indians about fifty miles to the north.
