= Lawson, Mesquite, Texas =

Area of Mesquite, Texas, United States

Coordinates: 32°42′08″N 96°33′54″W

Lawson is an area within Mesquite, Texas, United States; it was formerly a distinct unincorporated community in Dallas County. By 1982, Mesquite annexed the community.
