= Hattersville, Sunnyvale, Texas =

Former hamlet in Dallas County, Texas

Coordinates: 32.8132°N 96.5102°W

Hattersville is the name of a former hamlet in eastern Dallas County, Texas.

Boyd Hatter originally settled the hamlet and founded a school in the area. In 1953, the hamlet was merged with the nearby towns of Long Creek, Tripp, and New Hope to create the town of Sunnyvale, Texas.
