= New Hope, Sunnyvale, Texas =

Former town in Dallas County, Texas

Coordinates: 32.8195°N 96.5957°W

New Hope was a town in eastern Dallas County (not to be confused with the town of New Hope, Texas in Collin County) that was later incorporated into Sunnyvale, Texas, United States.

New Hope was founded in the 19th century. Eventually it became quite large and was the main rival of neighboring Mesquite. The town had a newspaper called the New Hope News, a post office, a school, a baseball club, several stores, and an annual fair called Gala Days. A storm destroyed much of New Hope in 1921, and it never fully recovered.

In the year 1953, the towns of New Hope, Long Creek, and Hattersville joined into Sunnyvale. There are some remainders of New Hope in Sunnyvale: several old houses, some which are still in use; the old New Hope schoolhouse; Kearney's Store, which sits on the site of the old Lander's mercantile store where Gala Days used to be held.
