= Sunnyvale School District =

Sunnyvale School District may refer to:

- Sunnyvale Independent School District in Sunnyvale, Texas
- Sunnyvale School District (California) in Sunnyvale, California
