= Long Creek, Sunnyvale, Texas =

Former town in Dallas County, Texas

Long Creek was the name of a town on the eastern side of Dallas County, Texas, United States. In 1953, it merged with the three nearby towns of Hattersville, Tripp and New Hope to form the town of Sunnyvale, Texas. Today, Long Creek's former area is in southern Sunnyvale.

== History ==
Out of all four former towns that form Sunnyvale, Long Creek is the oldest. The Captain Alexander W. and Lucinda Crownover Webb family and his in laws, The Benjamin and Nancy Robins Crownover family, were the first to settle in the Long Creek community about 1845 during the Republic of Texas's rule over the area. They were soon joined by the single John Peter Lawrence and James Madison and Mary Mann Bennett family.

The Bethany Missionary Baptist Church was established in Long Creek on 18 March 1849. It is thought to be the first church east of the White Rock Community, later known as Urbandale. Church meetings were held in the homes of the members. Alexander W. Webb donated land for a church building but the need for a school in the community caused a two-story schoolhouse to be built instead. The church continued to meet in members homes until it disbanded in the fall of 1871. The school later combined with and moved to nearby Tripp schools. A Woodman of the World Lodge also used the second floor of the school house as a meeting place for several years.

Today, Long Creek Road still exists in the southern part of current-day Sunnyvale. It connects State Highway 352 with US Highway 80 and passes through the Long Creek Cemetery. The Sunnyvale area sheriff's office is also located on Long Creek Road.

== Long Creek Cemetery ==
Long Creek Cemetery was certified by the Texas Historical Commission as a Historic Texas Cemetery in 2005. On 2 October 1855 (some sources give the date as 1854), Leona Crownover Caldwell, wife of Solomon W. Caldwell, was laid to rest under a pecan tree in a field owned by her father, Benjamin Crownover. For 149 years, her grave was marked only by bois d'arc stumps, on 2 October 2004 the Long Creek Cemetery Association (established in 1910) dedicated and added a stone marker in her memory. There are eight marked graves dated between 1885 and 1879, however there are some marked only by bois d'arc stumps and others that may be unmarked. On 2 July 1879, Alexander W. Webb and William S. Caldwell deeded to the citizens of Long Creek Community a 2-acre (8,100 m^{2}) parcel from the Webb-Crownover Survey to be used as a public cemetery. Additional parcels were later donated over the years by members of the Crownover, Blevins, Reedy and Paschall families to extend the boundaries of the cemetery. Men who served during The War of 1812, the Black Hawk War, Republic of Texas, both sides of the Civil War rest quietly beside those from World Wars I & II, Korea, Vietnam, "Operation Enduring Freedom" in Iraq as well as those that served during times of peace within the grounds of Long Creek Cemetery. Some of the oldest burials in the cemetery include James Truss and Priscilla Dulaney Truss, both born in 1799 2.
