= Metro Airport =

Metro Airport may refer to

- Metro/Airport station, a VTA railway station in California
- Van Nuys Airport in California, formerly known as Metropolitan Airport
- Detroit Metropolitan Wayne County Airport near Detroit, Michigan
- Metropolitan Airports Commission, the agency that owns and operates airports in the Twin Cities region
- Mesquite Metro Airport in Texas
