= AMC 30 Mesquite =

Coordinates: 32.789°N 96.627°W

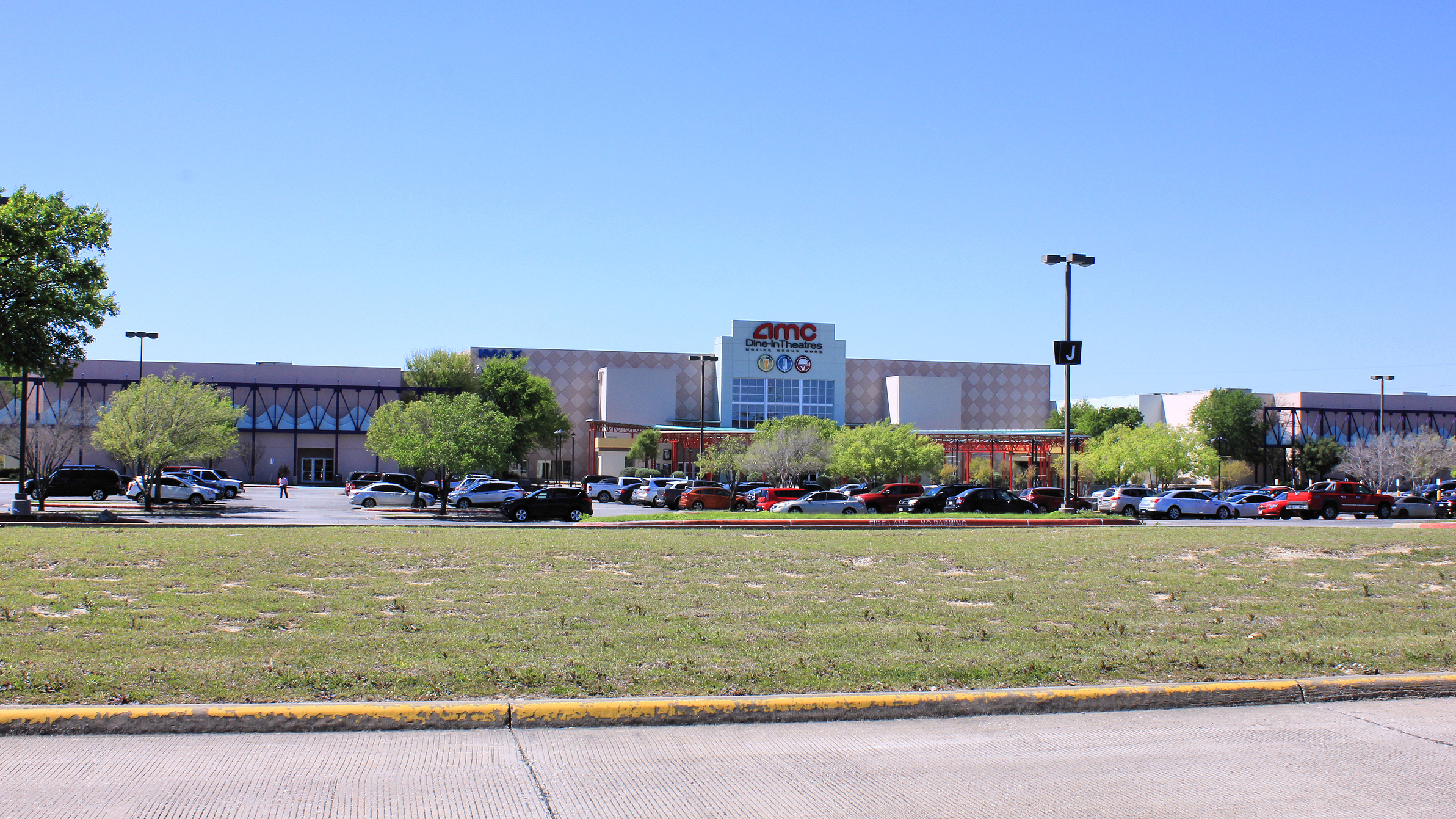
AMC 30 Mesquite

The AMC 30 Mesquite is a movie theater located in Mesquite, Texas, United States, at 19919 I-635. It is in the AMC Theatres group. There is also a Fork and Screen dine in theater with Cinema Suites and MacGuffin's bar and lounge in the theater. AMC Mesquite 30 opened in March of 1998 as the largest theater in the area. The theater had 3 snack bars, each on their own respective themed sides of the theater; Main, Western, and Jungle, all serving traditional theater snacks. In 2014, the AMC Mesquite 30 became a dine-in theater with a bar in the lobby and reclined seating.
