= Dallas County, Texas =

County in Texas, United States

- County
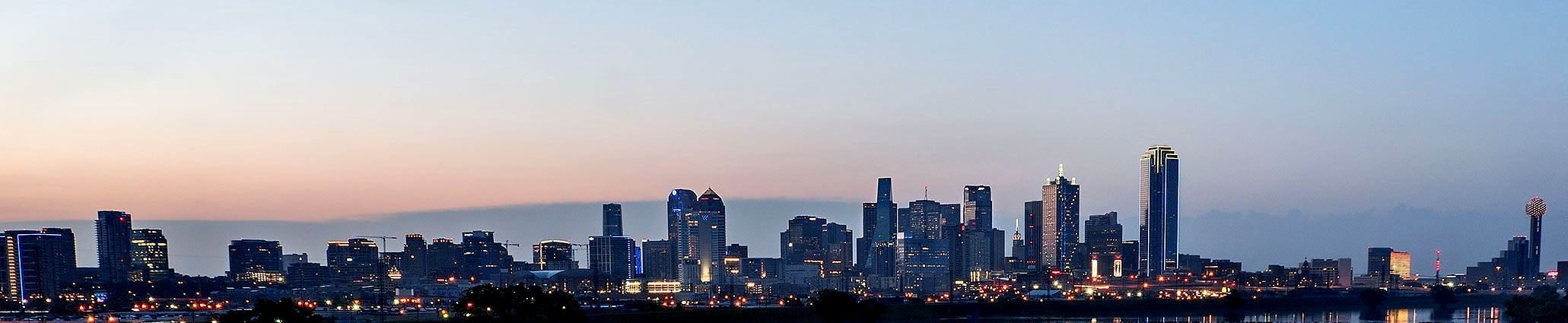
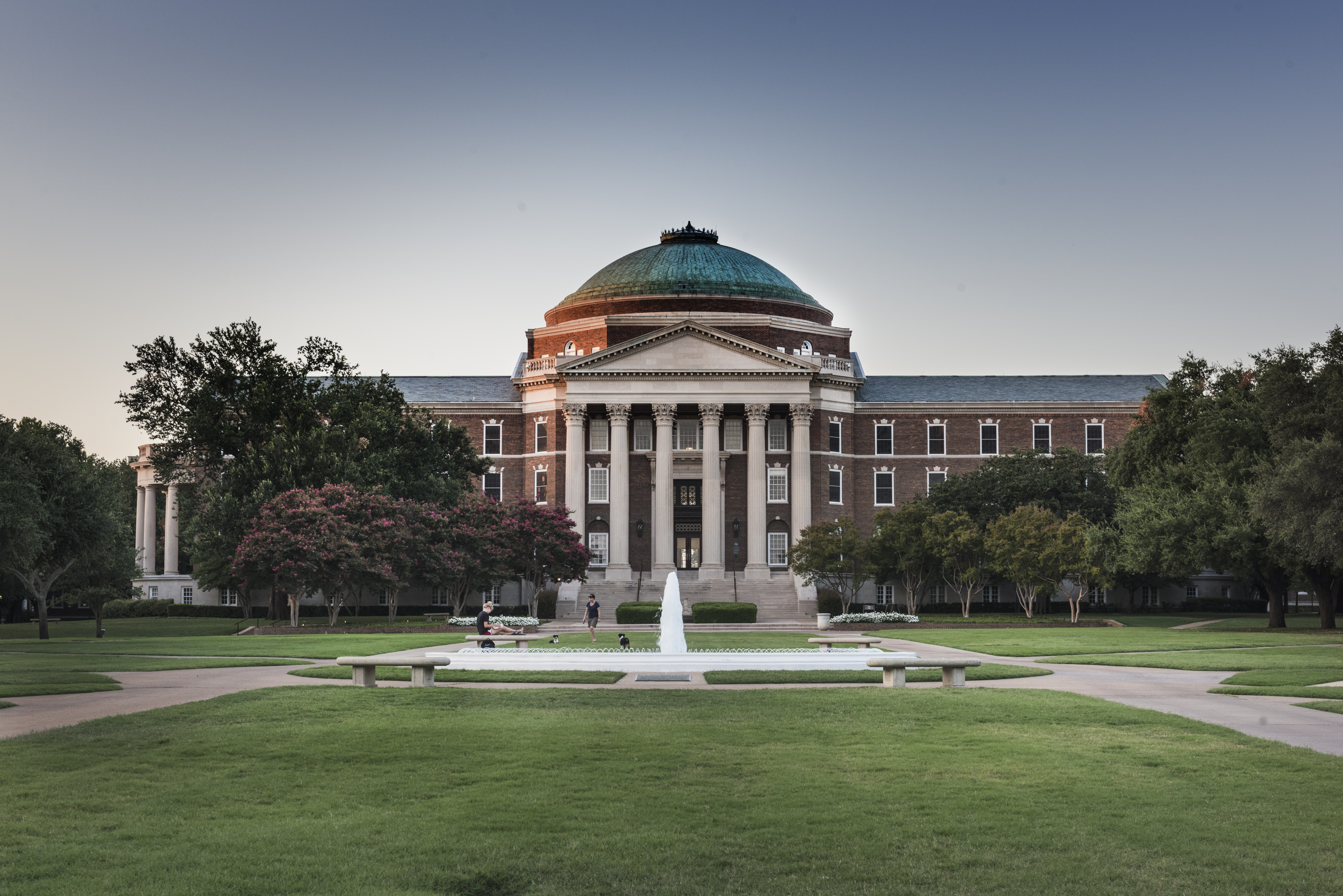
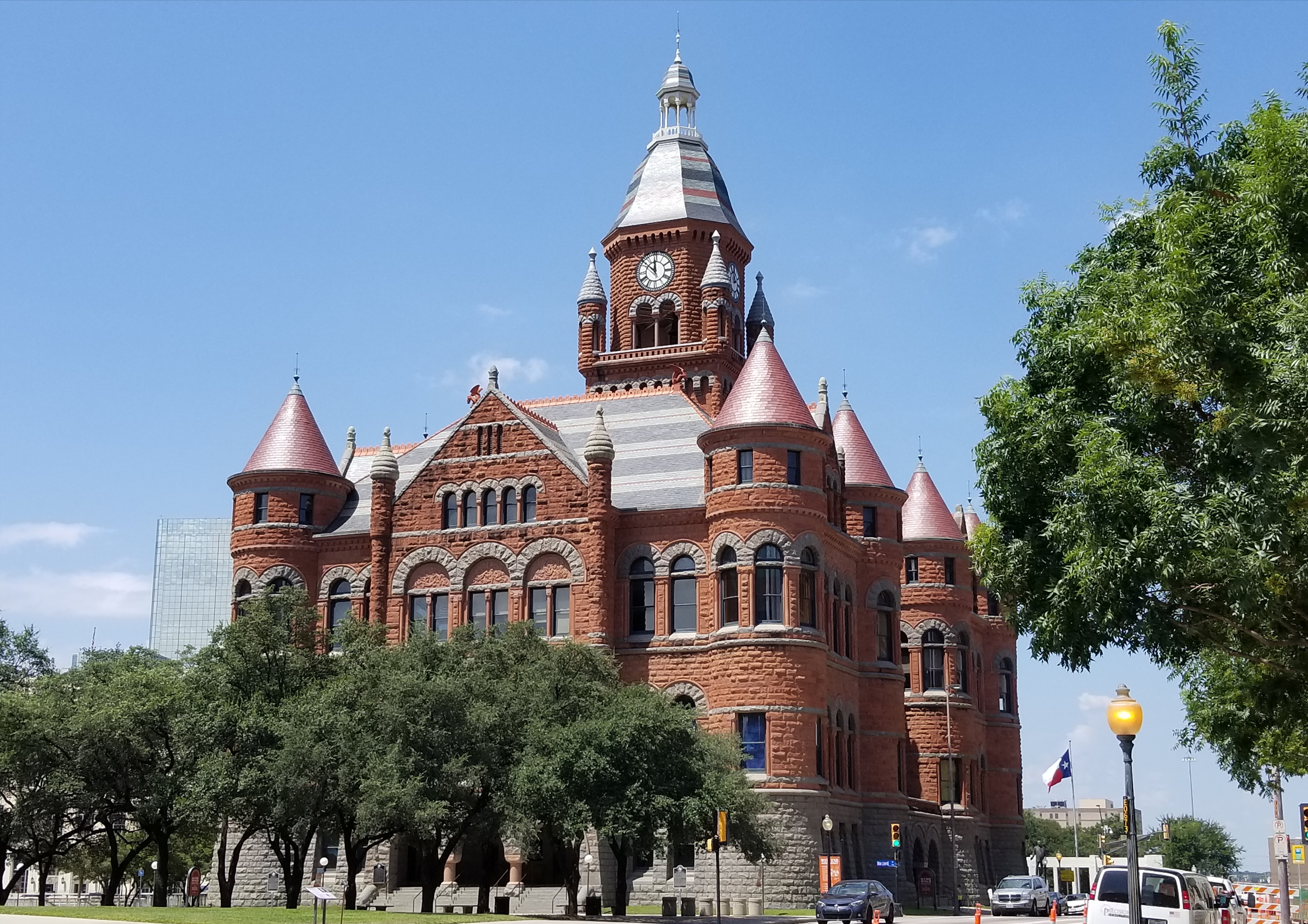
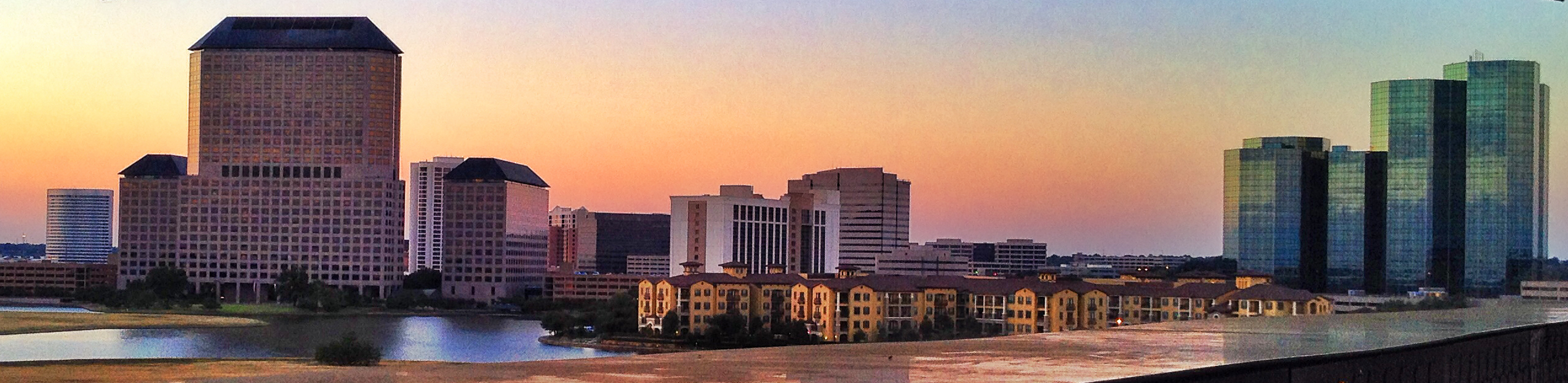
- Dallas panorama Dallas Hall in University Park Former Dallas County Courthouse Las Colinas in Irving

- Flag Seal

- Location within the U.S. state of Texas
- Coordinates: 32.766987°N 96.778424°W
- Country: United States
- State: Texas
- Founded: March 30, 1846
- Named for: George M. Dallas
- Seat: Dallas
- Largest city: Dallas

Government
  - County judge: Clay Jenkins

Area
  - Total: 908.644 sq mi (2,353.38 km^{2})
  - Land: 873.160 sq mi (2,261.47 km^{2})
  - Water: 35.484 sq mi (91.90 km^{2}) 3.91%

Population (2020)
  - Total: 2,613,539
  - Estimate (2025): 2,661,397 ▲
  - Density: 3,043.236/sq mi (1,175.000/km^{2})

GDP
  - Total: $389.402 billion (2024)
- Time zone: UTC−6 (Central)
  - Summer (DST): UTC−5 (CDT)
- Congressional districts: 5th, 6th, 24th, 30th, 32nd, 33rd
- Website: www.dallascounty.org

Dallas County is a county located in the U.S. state of Texas. As of the 2020 census, the population was 2,613,539, and was estimated to be 2,656,028 in 2024, making it the second-most populous county in Texas and the eighth-most populous county in the United States. Its county seat is Dallas, the third-most populous city in Texas and the ninth-most populous city in the United States. The county was founded on March 30, 1846 and was possibly named for George M. Dallas, the 11th Vice President of the United States, whom served under President James K. Polk. Dallas County is included in the eleven-county Dallas–Fort Worth–Arlington metropolitan statistical area, which is the fourth-most populous metropolitan area in the United States.

Municipal expansion within Dallas County has blurred the geographic lines between cities and between neighboring counties.

== Geography ==
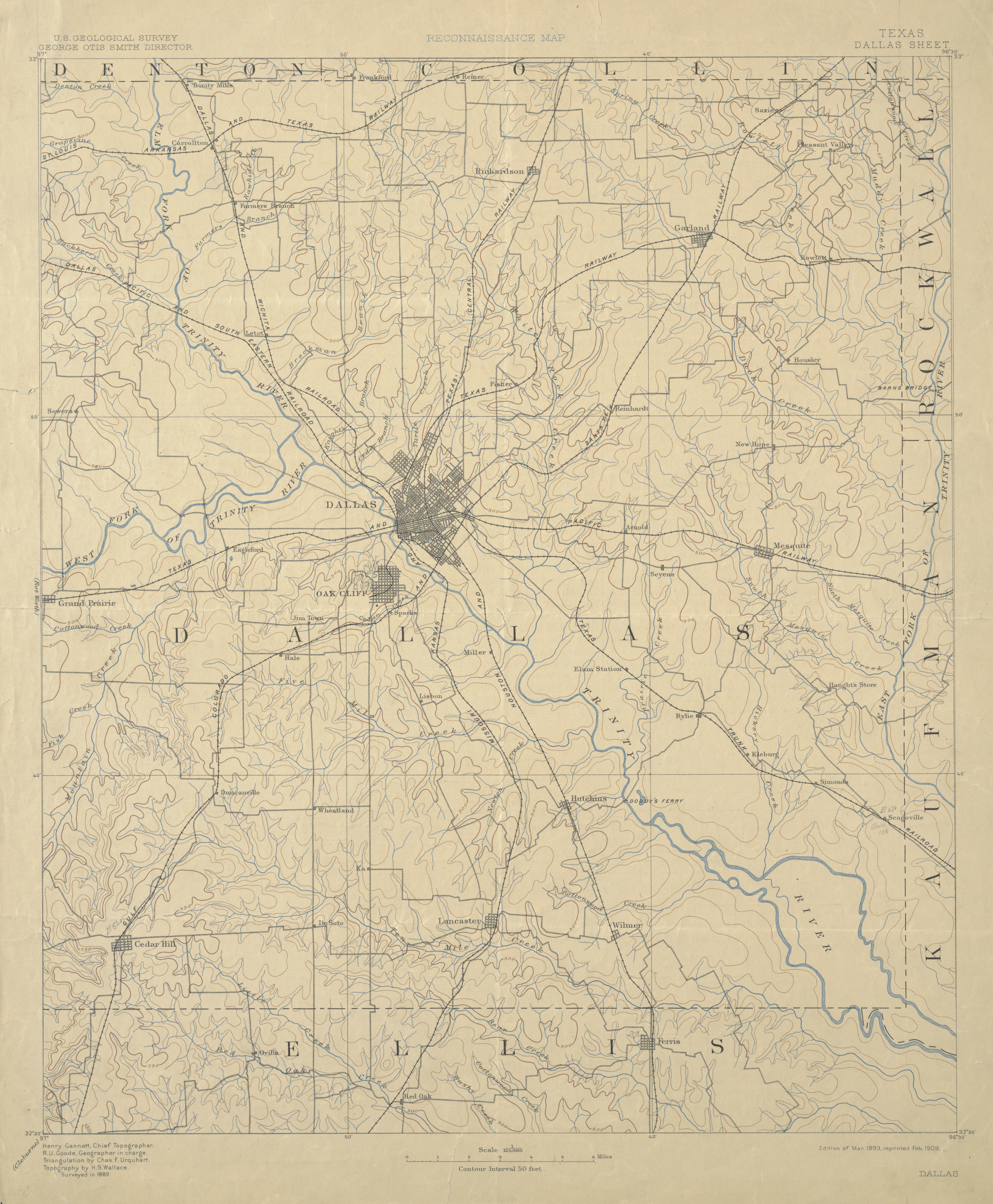
1893 USGS map of Dallas County

According to the United States Census Bureau, the county has a total area of 908.644 square miles (2,353.38 km^{2}), of which 873.160 square miles (2,261.47 km^{2}) is land and 35.484 square miles (91.90 km^{2}) (3.91%) is water. It is the 177th largest county in Texas by total area. 3,519 acres (1,424 ha) of the county are contained within 21 county-owned nature preserves, which were acquired through the county's Open Space Program.

=== Lakes ===
- Lake Ray Hubbard
- White Rock Lake

=== Adjacent counties ===
- Denton County (northwest)
- Collin County (northeast)
- Rockwall County (east)
- Kaufman County (southeast)
- Ellis County (south)
- Tarrant County (west)

== Climate ==
Dallas County

Climate chart (precipitation, max. and min. temperature)
J	F	M	A	M	J	J	A	S	O	N	D
107 13 4	53 18 5	91 22 8	88 27 14	126 31 20	68 32 24	47 34 25	62 35 27	107 32 21	95 28 15	62 21 11	66 15 5
- █ Average max. and min. temperatures in °C
- █ Precipitation totals in mm
Imperial conversion
J	F	M	A	M	J	J	A	S	O	N	D
4.2 55 39	2.1 64 41	3.6 72 46	3.5 81 57	5 88 68	2.7 90 75	1.9 93 77	2.4 95 81	4.2 90 70	3.7 82 59	2.4 70 52	2.6 59 41
- █ Average max. and min. temperatures in °F
- █ Precipitation totals in inches

== Communities ==
=== Cities (multiple counties) ===
- Carrollton (partly in Denton County and a small part in Collin County)
- Cedar Hill (small part in Ellis County)
- Combine (partly in Kaufman County)
- Coppell (small part in Denton County)
- Dallas (county seat) (small parts in Collin, Denton, Kaufman and Rockwall counties)
- Ferris (mostly in Ellis County)
- Garland (small parts in Collin and Rockwall counties)
- Glenn Heights (partly in Ellis County)
- Grand Prairie (partly in Tarrant County and a small part in Ellis County)
- Grapevine (mostly in Tarrant County and a small part in Denton County)
- Lewisville (mostly in Denton County)
- Mesquite (small part in Kaufman County)
- Ovilla (mostly in Ellis County)
- Richardson (small part in Collin County)
- Rowlett (small part in Rockwall County)
- Sachse (small part in Collin County)
- Seagoville (small part in Kaufman County)
- Wylie (mostly in Collin County and a small part in Rockwall County)

=== Cities ===
- Balch Springs
- Cockrell Hill
- DeSoto
- Duncanville
- Farmers Branch
- Hutchins
- Irving
- Lancaster
- University Park
- Wilmer

=== Towns ===
- Addison
- Highland Park
- Sunnyvale

=== Unincorporated areas ===
==== Census-designated places ====
- Bear Creek Ranch

==== Other communities ====
- Sand Branch

=== Historical communities ===
- Alpha (not incorporated)
- Buckingham (Annexed by Richardson in 1996)
- Cedar Springs (First settled in February 1841. In 1929 the community was annexed by the city of Dallas.)
- Duck Creek (merged into Garland in 1887)
- East Dallas (annexed by the city of Dallas in 1890 but was once a city of its own)
- Embree (merged into Garland in 1887)
- Fruitdale (annexed by Dallas in 1964)
- Hatterville (Merged into Sunnyvale in 1953)
- Hord's Ridge (Merged into Oak Cliff in 1887)
- Kleberg (Absorbed by City of Dallas in 1978)
- La Reunion (Absorbed by City of Dallas in 1860)
- Letot (Northwest Dallas County, annexed by Dallas)
- Liberty Grove
- Lisbon (Absorbed by City of Dallas in 1929)
- Little Egypt
- Long Creek (Merged into Sunnyvale in 1953)
- Meaders
- New Hope (Merged into Sunnyvale in 1953 - not to be confused with the Collin County town of the same name)
- Noel Junction (not incorporated, Addison/Dallas)
- Oak Cliff (Annexed by Dallas in 1903)
- Penn Springs (Annexed by Duncanville in 1947)
- Pleasant Grove (Annexed by Dallas by 1962)
- Preston Hollow (Annexed by Dallas in 1945)
- Renner (annexed by Dallas in 1977)
- Rylie (annexed by Dallas in 1978)
- Scyene
- Trinity Mills (Annexed by Carrollton)
- Tripp (Merged into Sunnyvale in 1953)

== Demographics ==
Historical population
Census	Pop.	Note	%±
1850	2,743		—
1860	8,665		215.9%
1870	13,814		59.4%
1880	33,488		142.4%
1890	67,042		100.2%
1900	82,726		23.4%
1910	135,748		64.1%
1920	210,551		55.1%
1930	325,691		54.7%
1940	398,564		22.4%
1950	614,799		54.3%
1960	951,527		54.8%
1970	1,327,321		39.5%
1980	1,556,390		17.3%
1990	1,852,810		19.0%
2000	2,218,899		19.8%
2010	2,368,139		6.7%
2020	2,613,539		10.4%
2025 (est.)	2,661,397	▲	1.8%
U.S. Decennial Census; 1790–1960 1900–1990; 1990–2000 2010–2020

As of the third quarter of 2024, the median home value in Dallas County was $325,980.

As of the 2023 American Community Survey, there are 971,690 estimated households in Dallas County with an average of 2.65 persons per household. The county has a median household income of $74,149. Approximately 13.8% of the county's population lives at or below the poverty line. Dallas County has an estimated 68.9% employment rate, with 34.8% of the population holding a bachelor's degree or higher and 81.7% holding a high school diploma.

The top five reported ancestries (people were allowed to report up to two ancestries, thus the figures will generally add to more than 100%) were English (56.8%), Spanish (34.0%), Indo-European (3.0%), Asian and Pacific Islander (4.3%), and Other (1.9%).

=== Racial and ethnic composition ===
Dallas County, Texas – Racial and ethnic composition Note: the US Census treats Hispanic/Latino as an ethnic category. This table excludes Latinos from the racial categories and assigns them to a separate category. Hispanics/Latinos may be of any race.
Race / Ethnicity (NH = Non-Hispanic)	Pop 1980	Pop 1990	Pop 2000	Pop 2010	Pop 2020	% 1980	% 1990	% 2000	% 2010	% 2020
White alone (NH)	1,089,655	1,115,096	983,317	784,693	724,987	70.01%	60.18%	44.32%	33.14%	27.74%
Black or African American alone (NH)	285,787	362,130	445,716	518,732	564,741	18.36%	19.54%	20.09%	21.90%	21.61%
Native American or Alaska Native alone (NH)	6,487	7,644	8,106	7,330	6,743	0.42%	0.41%	0.37%	0.31%	0.26%
Asian alone (NH)	15,034	49,928	87,495	117,797	181,314	0.97%	2.69%	3.94%	4.97%	6.94%
Native Hawaiian or Pacific Islander alone (NH)	x	x	926	874	1,175	x	x	0.04%	0.04%	0.04%
Other race alone (NH)	4,866	2,382	2,388	3,346	9,990	0.31%	0.13%	0.11%	0.14%	0.38%
Mixed race or Multiracial (NH)	x	x	28,222	29,427	66,754	x	x	1.27%	1.24%	2.55%
Hispanic or Latino (any race)	154,561	315,630	662,729	905,940	1,057,835	9.93%	17.04%	29.87%	38.26%	40.48%
Total	1,556,390	1,852,810	2,218,899	2,368,139	2,613,539	100.00%	100.00%	100.00%	100.00%	100.00%

=== American Community Survey 2025 data ===
The United States Census Bureau estimated that in 2025, Dallas County’s population was 2.661.397. It was also estimated that the county's population was 25,02% Non-Hispanic White, 43,44% Hispanic or Latino, 21,04% Non-Hispanic Black, 7,91% Asian, 0,25% Native American, 0,05% Pacific Islander, and 2,29% Multiracial.

Total	Population	Percentage
Non-Hispanic White	665.895	25,02%
Hispanic or Latino	1.156.123	43,44%
Non-Hispanic Black	560.064	21,04%
Asian	210.504	7,91%
Native American	6.600	0,25%
Pacific Islander	1.213	0,05%
Non-Hispanic Multiracial	60.998	2,29%

=== 2020 census ===
As of the 2020 census, there were 2,613,539 people, 965,537 households, and 616,554 families residing in the county. The median age was 34.2 years. 24.5% of residents were under the age of 18 and 11.4% of residents were 65 years of age or older. For every 100 females there were 97.6 males, and for every 100 females age 18 and over there were 95.5 males age 18 and over.

The population density was 2,993.6 inhabitants per square mile (1,155.8/km^{2}). There were 1,038,656 housing units at an average density of 1,189.5 per square mile (459.3/km^{2}), of which 7.0% were vacant. Among occupied housing units, 48.8% were owner-occupied and 51.2% were renter-occupied; the homeowner vacancy rate was 1.4% and the rental vacancy rate was 8.4%.

The racial makeup of the county was 35.4% White, 22.0% Black or African American, 1.2% American Indian and Alaska Native, 7.0% Asian, 0.1% Native Hawaiian and Pacific Islander, 18.3% from some other race, and 16.1% from two or more races. Hispanic or Latino residents of any race comprised 40.5% of the population.

99.4% of residents lived in urban areas, while 0.6% lived in rural areas.

Of those households, 33.9% had children under the age of 18 living in them. Of all households, 41.3% were married-couple households, 21.3% were households with a male householder and no spouse or partner present, and 30.7% were households with a female householder and no spouse or partner present. About 28.9% of all households were made up of individuals and 7.7% had someone living alone who was 65 years of age or older.

The increase among people of color reflected nationwide demographic trends of greater diversification.

=== 2010 census ===
As of the 2010 census, there were 2,368,139 people, 856,290 households, and _ families residing in the county. The population density was 2,718.0 inhabitants per square mile (1,049.4/km^{2}). There were 943,622 housing units at an average density of 1,083.0 per square mile (418.1/km^{2}). The racial makeup of the county was 53.55% White, 22.31% African American, 0.72% Native American, 5.04% Asian, 0.05% Pacific Islander, 15.53% from some other races and 2.82% from two or more races. Hispanic or Latino people of any race were 38.26% of the population.

=== 2000 census ===
As of the 2000 census, there were 2,218,899 people, 807,621 households, and 533,837 families residing in the county. The population density was 2,523.0 inhabitants per square mile (974.1/km^{2}). There were 854,119 housing units at an average density of 971.0 per square mile (374.9/km^{2}). The racial makeup of the county was 58.35% White, 20.31% African American, 0.56% Native American, 3.98% Asian, 0.06% Pacific Islander, 14.04% from some other races and 2.70% from two or more races. Hispanic or Latino people of any race were 29.87% of the population.

There were 807,621 households out of which 35.10% had children under the age of 18 living with them, 46.90% were married couples living together, 14.10% had a female householder with no husband present, and 33.90% were non-families. 27.30% of all households were made up of individuals and 5.90% had someone living alone who was 65 years of age or older. The average household size was 2.71 and the average family size was 3.34.

In the county, the population was spread out with 27.90% under the age of 18, 10.70% from 18 to 24, 34.40% from 25 to 44, 18.90% from 45 to 64, and 8.10% who were 65 years of age or older. The median age was 31 years. For every 100 females there were 99.80 males. For every 100 females age 18 and over, there were 98.00 males.

The median income for a household in the county was $43,324, and the median income for a family was $49,062. Males had a median income of $34,988 versus $29,539 for females. The per capita income for the county was $22,603. About 10.60% of families and 13.40% of the population were below the poverty line, including 18.00% of those under age 18 and 10.50% of those age 65 or over.

== Government and politics ==
=== Government ===
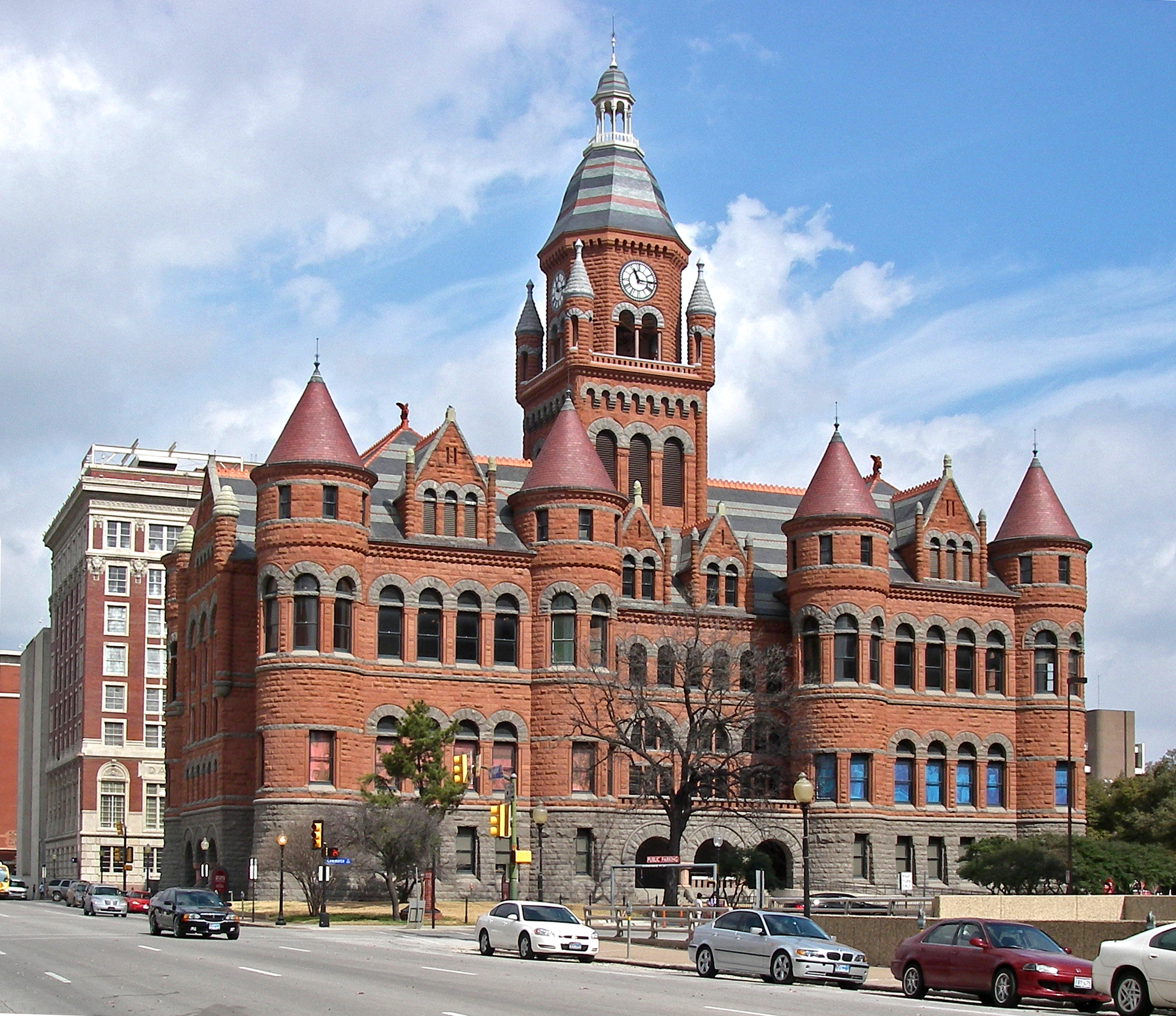
Former Dallas County Courthouse

Dallas County, like all counties in Texas, is governed by a commissioners' court. This court consists of the county judge (the chairperson of the court), who is elected county-wide, and four commissioners who are elected by the voters in each of four precincts.

The Commissioners' Court is the policy-making body for the county; in addition, the county judge is the senior executive and administrative position in the county. The Commissioners' Court sets the county tax rate, adopts the budget, appoints boards and commissions, approves grants and personnel actions, and oversees the administration of county government. Each commissioner supervises a Road and Bridge District. The Commissioners' Court approves the budget and sets the tax rate for the hospital district, which is charged with the responsibility for providing acute medical care for citizens who otherwise would not receive adequate medical services.

==== Commissioners' Court ====
Office	Name	Party
County Judge	Clay Jenkins	Democratic
Commissioner, Precinct 1	Theresa Daniel	Democratic
Commissioner, Precinct 2	Andrew Sommerman	Democratic
Commissioner, Precinct 3	John Wiley Price	Democratic
Commissioner, Precinct 4	Elba Garcia	Democratic

==== County officials ====
Office	Name	Party
Criminal District Attorney	John Creuzot	Democratic
District Clerk	Felicia Pitre	Democratic
County Clerk	John F. Warren	Democratic
Sheriff	Marian Brown	Democratic
Tax Assessor-Collector	John R. Ames	Democratic
Treasurer	Pauline Medrano	Democratic

==== Constables ====
Office	Name	Party
Constable, Precinct 1	Tracey Gulley	Democratic
Constable, Precinct 2	Deanna Hammond	Democratic
Constable, Precinct 3	Henry Curry	Democratic
Constable, Precinct 4	Eddie Brown, Jr.	Democratic
Constable, Precinct 5	Michael Orozco	Democratic

=== Courts ===
==== Justices of the Peace ====
Office	Name	Party
Justice of the Peace, Precinct 1, Place 1	Thomas G. Jones	Democratic
Justice of the Peace, Precinct 1, Place 2	Valencia Nash	Democratic
Justice of the Peace, Precinct 2, Place 1	Margaret O’Brien	Democratic
Justice of the Peace, Precinct 2, Place 2	Katina Whitfield	Democratic
Justice of the Peace, Precinct 3, Place 1	Adam M. Swartz	Democratic
Justice of the Peace, Precinct 3, Place 2	Steven L. Seider	Republican
Justice of the Peace, Precinct 4, Place 1	Mike Jones	Democratic
Justice of the Peace, Precinct 4, Place 2	Sasha Moreno	Democratic
Justice of the Peace, Precinct 5, Place 1	Sara Martinez	Democratic
Justice of the Peace, Precinct 5, Place 2	Juan Jasso	Democratic

==== County Criminal Courts ====
Office	Name	Party
County Criminal Court No. 1	Marilynn Mayse	Democratic
County Criminal Court No. 2	Julia Hayes	Democratic
County Criminal Court No. 3	Audrey Faye Moorehead	Democratic
County Criminal Court No. 4	Dominique Torres Williams	Democratic
County Criminal Court No. 5	Lisa Green	Democratic
County Criminal Court No. 6	Angela M. King	Democratic
County Criminal Court No. 7	Remeko Tranisha Edwards	Democratic
County Criminal Court No. 8	Carmen P. White	Democratic
County Criminal Court No. 9	Peggy Hoffman	Democratic
County Criminal Court No. 10	Monique H. Bracey Huff	Democratic
County Criminal Court No. 11	Shequitta Kelly	Democratic

==== County Criminal Courts of Appeals ====
Office	Name	Party
County Criminal Court of Appeals No. 1	Kristin Wade	Democratic
County Criminal Court of Appeals No. 2	Pamela Luther	Democratic

==== County civil courts ====
Office	Name	Party
County Court at Law No. 1	D'Metria Benson	Democratic
County Court at Law No. 2	Melissa J. Bellan	Democratic
County Court at Law No. 3	Sally Montgomery	Democratic
County Court at Law No. 4	Dianne Kathryn Jones	Democratic
County Court at Law No. 5	Nicole Taylor	Democratic

==== County Probate Courts ====
Office	Name	Party
County Probate Court No. 1	Julia Malveaux	Democratic
County Probate Court No. 2	Ingrid Michelle Warren	Democratic
County Probate Court No. 3	Margaret Jones-Johnson	Democratic

==== Criminal District Courts ====
Office	Name	Party
Criminal District Court No. 1	Jennifer Balido	Republican
Criminal District Court No. 2	Elizabeth D. Frizzell	Democratic
Criminal District Court No. 3	Audra Riley	Democratic
Criminal District Court No. 4	Dominique Collins	Democratic
Criminal District Court No. 5	Carter Thompson	Democratic
Criminal District Court No. 6	Nancy Mulder	Democratic
Criminal District Court No. 7	Chika Anyiam	Democratic
194th District Court	Ernest White	Democratic
195th District Court	Hector Garza	Democratic
203rd District Court	Raquel "Rocky" Jones	Democratic
204th District Court	Tammy Kemp	Democratic
265th District Court	Jennifer Bennett	Democratic
282nd District Court	Amber Givens	Democratic
283rd District Court	Lela Lawrence Mays	Democratic
291st District Court	Stephanie Huff	Democratic
292nd District Court	Brandon Birmingham	Democratic
363rd District Court	Tracy Holmes	Democratic

==== Civil District Courts ====
Office	Name	Party
14th District Court	Eric V. Moyé	Democratic
44th District Court	Veretta Frazier	Democratic
68th District Court	Martin Hoffman	Democratic
95th District Court	Monica Purdy	Democratic
101st District Court	Staci Williams	Democratic
116th District Court	Tonya Parker	Democratic
134th District Court	Dale Tillery	Democratic
160th District Court	Aiesha Redmond	Democratic
162nd District Court	Kim Bailey Phipps	Democratic
191st District Court	Gena Slaughter	Democratic
192nd District Court	Maria Aceves	Democratic
193rd District Court	Bridgett N. Whitmore	Democratic
298th District Court	Emily G. Tobolowsky	Democratic

==== Family District Courts ====
Office	Name	Party
254th District Court	Kimberly Brown	Democratic
255th District Court	Vonda Bailey	Democratic
256th District Court	Sandre M. Streete	Democratic
301st District Court	Ashley Wysocki	Republican
302nd District Court	Sandra Jackson	Democratic
303rd District Court	LaDeitra Adkins	Democratic
330th District Court	Andrea D. Plumlee	Democratic

==== Juvenile District Courts ====
Office	Name	Party
304th District Court	Andrea Martin	Democratic
305th District Court	Cheryl Lee Shannon	Democratic

==== County services ====
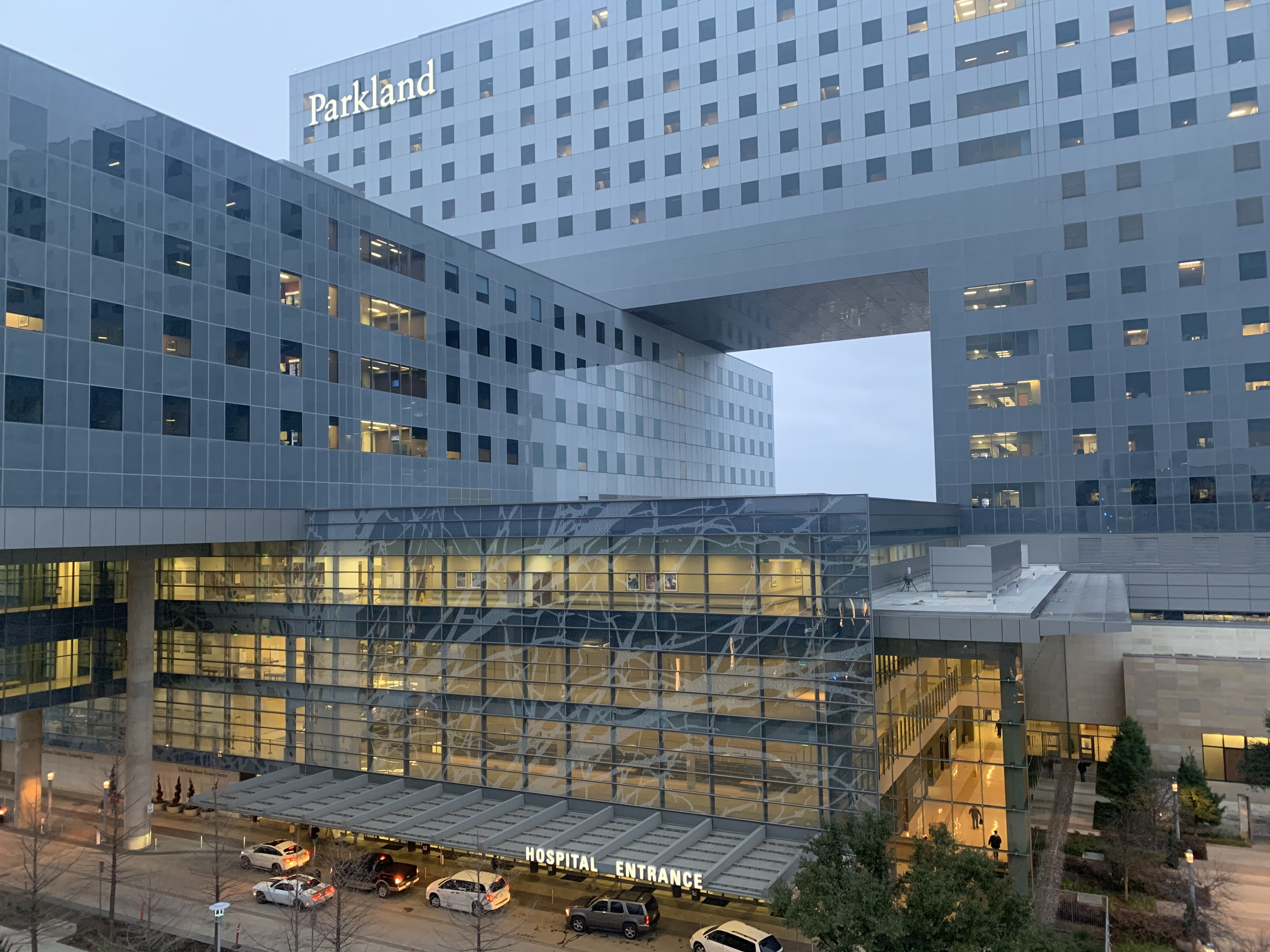
Parkland Memorial Hospital

The Parkland Health & Hospital System (Dallas County Hospital District) operates the Parkland Memorial Hospital and various health centers.

The Commissioners' Court meets the first and third Tuesday at the Commissioners' Courtroom located in the Dallas County Administration Building at 411 Elm St., corner of Elm and Houston streets. The building was the headquarters of the Texas School Book Depository Company until 1970. In 1963 assassin Lee Harvey Oswald shot President John F. Kennedy from a window located on the sixth floor which today houses the Sixth Floor Museum dedicated to the late president's memory.

Acts of the commissioners court are known as 'court orders'. These orders include setting county policies and procedures, issuing contracts, authorizing expenditures, and managing county resources and departments. Most importantly, the commissioners court sets the annual tax rate and the budget for Dallas County government and the courts. The commissioners also set the tax rate and budget for the Dallas County Hospital District which operates Parkland Hospital.

The commissioners court has direct control over all county offices and departments not otherwise administered by a county elected official. Those departments include Dallas County Elections, Health and Human Services, Facilities Management, Parks and Open Space Program, I.T. Services, Homeland Security and Emergency Services, among others. Through their budget making powers, the commissioners exercise indirect control over the District Attorney's Office, Sheriff's Office, District Clerk's Office, County Clerk's Office and County Treasurer's Office. The commissioners also set the budget for each of the District, County, and Justice courts.

Dallas County employs a commissioners court administrator who is responsible for the day-to-day management of the commissioners court and implementing the Dallas County Master Plan and the directives of the commissioners court. The current commissioners court administrator is Darryl Martin who was hired by the commissioners in 2008.

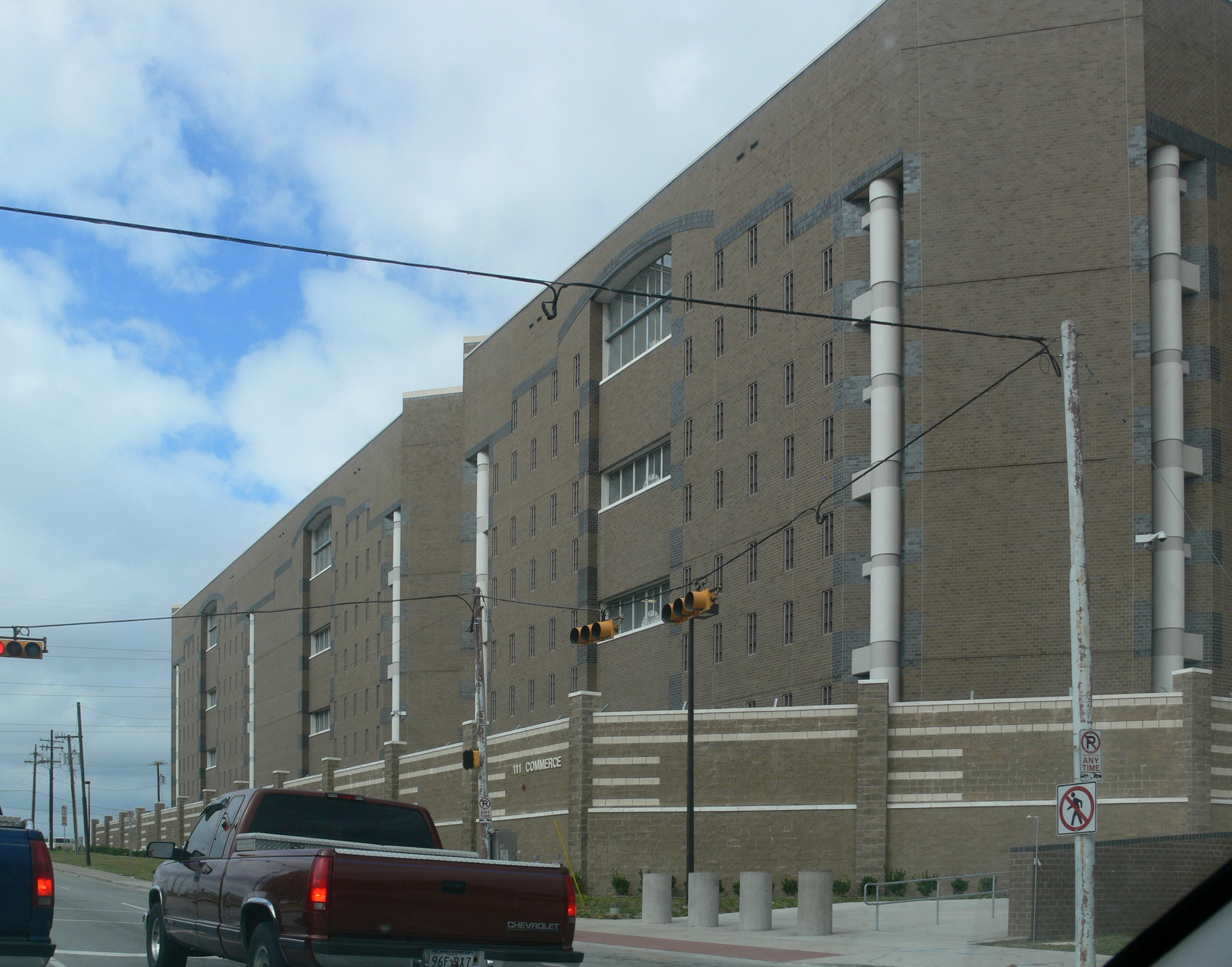
Dallas County Jail facility at 111 West Commerce Street

Dallas County operates several jail facilities. They include:

- 111 Riverfront Blvd (Dallas)
  - North Tower Jail
  - South Tower Jail - also known as the "Suzanne Kays Tower"
  - West Tower Jail
- Government Center Jail - 600 Commerce Street (Dallas)
- Decker Detention Center - 899 North Stemmons Freeway (Dallas)
- (formerly) Suzanne Kays Jail - 521 North Industrial Boulevard (Dallas) - population integrated into the South Tower; demolished to clear way for the Trinity River Project

The Texas Department of Criminal Justice operates the Hutchins State Jail for men in an unincorporated area adjacent to Hutchins. Corrections Corporation of America operates the Dawson Unit, a co-gender state jail in Downtown Dallas, under contract.

Federal Correctional Institution, Seagoville, is located in Seagoville.

=== Politics ===
Dallas County was one of the first areas of the South to break away from a Solid South voting pattern. This coincided with the county's explosive postwar growth. It swung from a 13-point win for Democrat Harry Truman in 1948 to a 23-point win for Republican Dwight Eisenhower in 1952. For most of the second half of the 20th century, it would be one of the most conservative urban counties in the nation, voting for the GOP in every presidential election until 2008. The lone exception was when Texas native Lyndon B. Johnson successfully ran for a full term as president on the Democratic ticket in 1964.

In the 2004 election, Democrats won their first countywide administrative office since 1986 by electing Lupe Valdez to the office of Dallas County sheriff. The last Democratic countywide administrator was D. Connally elected County Surveyor prior to the office's abolition. Democrats also won three district court benches in 2004. Two years later, Democrats swept every contested countywide race, including those for County Judge, District Clerk, County Clerk, District Attorney, County Treasurer, as well as every contested judicial seat.

Since the 1990s, Dallas County has voted more Democratic than the state of Texas as a whole. It swung from an 18-point win for George H. W. Bush in 1988 to only a two-point win in 1992. In 1996, Bill Clinton became only the fourth Democrat since Truman to win 40 percent of the vote. Former Governor of Texas George W. Bush earned relatively narrow wins in 2000 and 2004, even as he easily carried the state. This trend amplified in 2008 when the county swung dramatically to Barack Obama, whose coattails allowed Democrats to win the remaining Republican-held judicial seats.

Since the 2010s, Dallas County has been one of the most Democratic-leaning counties in Texas. In 2012, Obama won Dallas County by virtually the same margin as he had done in 2008. In 2016, Hillary Clinton increased the Democratic margin of victory even further. She became the first Democrat to win 60% of the county's vote since Franklin D. Roosevelt in 1944, while Donald Trump became the first Republican not to win 40% of the vote in the county since 1992. Joe Biden managed an even larger win in 2020.

In 2024, though Trump did not carry the county, he received his best-ever vote share, with 38%. This was likely due to his increase in Hispanic support, which was 55% in the state of Texas compared to Kamala Harris’s 44%.

United States presidential election results for Dallas County, Texas
Year	Republican		Democratic		Third party(ies)	
Year	No.	%	No.	%	No.	%
1912	590	6.09%	7,725	79.79%	1,367	14.12%
1916	2,554	15.71%	13,410	82.51%	289	1.78%
1920	4,984	23.35%	14,390	67.41%	1,973	9.24%
1924	8,618	21.63%	30,207	75.83%	1,012	2.54%
1928	27,272	60.89%	17,437	38.93%	78	0.17%
1932	8,919	19.12%	37,363	80.09%	371	0.80%
1936	7,204	14.51%	42,153	84.89%	300	0.60%
1940	16,574	25.06%	49,431	74.74%	131	0.20%
1944	21,099	22.44%	60,909	64.77%	12,028	12.79%
1948	35,664	37.80%	47,464	50.31%	11,216	11.89%
1952	118,218	62.73%	69,394	36.82%	850	0.45%
1956	125,361	65.06%	65,472	33.98%	1,862	0.97%
1960	149,369	62.16%	88,876	36.99%	2,054	0.85%
1964	137,065	45.06%	166,472	54.73%	621	0.20%
1968	184,193	50.66%	123,809	34.06%	55,552	15.28%
1972	305,112	69.53%	129,662	29.55%	4,021	0.92%
1976	263,081	56.65%	196,303	42.27%	5,001	1.08%
1980	306,682	59.18%	190,459	36.75%	21,072	4.07%
1984	405,444	66.41%	203,592	33.35%	1,460	0.24%
1988	347,094	58.38%	243,198	40.91%	4,246	0.71%
1992	256,007	38.72%	231,412	35.00%	173,833	26.29%
1996	260,058	46.78%	255,766	46.00%	40,129	7.22%
2000	322,345	52.58%	275,308	44.91%	15,386	2.51%
2004	346,246	50.35%	336,641	48.95%	4,822	0.70%
2008	310,000	41.89%	422,989	57.15%	7,085	0.96%
2012	295,813	41.57%	405,571	56.99%	10,228	1.44%
2016	262,945	34.34%	461,080	60.22%	41,657	5.44%
2020	307,076	33.29%	598,576	64.89%	16,861	1.83%
2024	322,569	37.96%	511,118	60.14%	16,185	1.90%

United States Senate election results for Dallas County, Texas1
Year	Republican		Democratic		Third party(ies)	
Year	No.	%	No.	%	No.	%
2024	291,528	34.61%	531,153	63.05%	19,744	2.34%

United States Senate election results for Dallas County, Texas2
Year	Republican		Democratic		Third party(ies)	
Year	No.	%	No.	%	No.	%
2020	330,851	36.13%	560,603	61.22%	24,207	2.64%
2026	206,355	26.33%	563,219	71.87%	14,140	1.80%

Texas Gubernatorial election results for Dallas County
Year	Republican		Democratic		Third party(ies)	
Year	No.	%	No.	%	No.	%
2022	224,684	35.93%	392,634	62.78%	8,073	1.29%
2026	231,770	29.45%	539,682	68.58%	15,479	1.97%

Dallas County has had three openly LGBT elected county officials: Lupe Valdez, elected Sheriff in 2004 and serving until 2017; Jim Foster, elected county judge in 2006, serving one term before defeat in the Democratic primary in 2010; and Gary Fitzsimmons, elected District Clerk in 2006.

==== State Board of Education members ====
District	Name	Party
District 9	Kevin Ellis	Republican
District 11	Brandon Hall	Republican
District 12	Pam Little	Republican
District 13	Tiffany Clark	Democratic
District 14	Evelyn Brooks	Republican

==== Texas state representatives ====
District	Name	Party	Residence
District 100	Venton Jones	Democratic	Dallas
District 102	Ana-Maria Ramos	Democratic	Dallas
District 103	Rafael Anchía	Democratic	Dallas
District 104	Jessica González	Democratic	Dallas
District 105	Terry Meza	Democratic	Irving
District 107	Linda Garcia	Democratic	Mesquite
District 108	Morgan Meyer	Republican	University Park
District 109	Aicha Davis	Democratic	Dallas
District 110	Toni Rose	Democratic	Dallas
District 111	Yvonne Davis	Democratic	Dallas
District 112	Angie Chen Button	Republican	Richardson
District 113	Rhetta Andrews Bowers	Democratic	Garland
District 114	John Bryant	Democratic	Dallas
District 115	Cassandra Hernandez	Democratic	Dallas

==== Texas state senators ====
District	Name	Party	Residence
District 2	Bob Hall	Republican	Edgewood (Van Zandt County)
District 12	Tan Parker	Republican	Flower Mound (Denton County)
District 16	Nathan Johnson	Democratic	Dallas
District 23	Royce West	Democratic	Dallas

==== United States representatives ====
District	Name	Party	Residence
Texas's 5th congressional district	Lance Gooden	Republican	Sunnyvale
Texas's 6th congressional district	Jake Ellzey	Republican	Midlothian (Ellis County)
Texas's 24th congressional district	Beth Van Duyne	Republican	Irving
Texas's 30th congressional district	Jasmine Crockett	Democratic	Dallas
Texas's 32nd congressional district	Julie Johnson	Democratic	Farmers Branch
Texas's 33rd congressional district	Marc Veasey	Democratic	Fort Worth (Tarrant County)

== Education ==
=== Primary and secondary schools ===
The following school districts serve Dallas County:

- Carrollton-Farmers Branch ISD (partly in Denton County)
- Cedar Hill ISD
- Coppell ISD
- Dallas ISD
- DeSoto ISD
- Duncanville ISD
- Ferris ISD (mostly in Ellis County)
- Garland ISD
- Grand Prairie ISD
- Grapevine-Colleyville ISD (mostly in Tarrant County)
- Highland Park ISD
- Irving ISD
- Lancaster ISD
- Mesquite ISD
- Richardson ISD
- Sunnyvale ISD

White flight meant the decrease of non-Hispanic white students in Dallas County K-12 school districts from 1997 until the 2014–2015 school year. The number was 138,760 in the former and 61,538 in the latter; during 2014–2015 county charter schools had about 5,000 non-Hispanic white students. In 2016 Eric Nicholson of the Dallas Observer wrote that the bulk of white K-12 enrollment is shifting to more distant suburban areas beyond Dallas County, and that "Teasing out causation is tricky" but that the perception of poverty, which many white families wish to avoid, is tied with race.

Wilmer-Hutchins Independent School District formerly served a part of the county. In 2006 WHISD officially merged into DISD.

=== Higher education ===
==== Community colleges ====
Dallas County is served by the Dallas College system of seven community colleges. Dallas College is the designated community college for the entire county.

==== Public universities ====
There are two public universities in Dallas County: the University of North Texas at Dallas and the University of Texas at Dallas, of which the latter is also partially located in Collin County.

==== Private universities ====
- Dallas Baptist University, located in Dallas
- University of Dallas, located in Irving
- Southern Methodist University, located in University Park

== Transportation ==
Dallas Area Rapid Transit provides bus and rail service to many cities in Dallas County, with Dallas being the largest.

The Trinity Railway Express, operated jointly by Dallas Area Rapid Transit and Trinity Metro, provides commuter rail service to both Dallas County and Tarrant County, connecting downtown Fort Worth with Downtown Dallas.

=== Major highways ===
- I-20
- I-30
- I-35E / US 77
- I-45
  - I-45 BL (Ferris)
- I-345
- I-635
- US 67
- US 75
- US 80
- US 175
- SH 66
- SH 78
- SH 114
- SH 121
- SH 161
- SH 180
- SH 183
- SH 190
- SH 289
- SH 310
- SH 342
- SH 352
- SH 356
- Loop 9 (under construction)
- Loop 12
- Spur 244
- Spur 303
- Spur 348
- Spur 366
- Spur 408
- Spur 482

=== Airports ===
==== Commercial Airports ====
- Love Field, located in Dallas, serves only domestic passengers.
- Dallas/Fort Worth International Airport is partially located in the city of Irving in Dallas County, and Grapevine and Euless in Tarrant County.

==== General Aviation Airports ====
- Addison Airport is located in and owned by the city of Addison.
- Dallas Executive Airport is located in and owned by the city of Dallas.
- Mesquite Metro Airport is located in and owned by the city of Mesquite.

== Infrastructure ==
=== Animal services ===
Dallas County has an Animal Control Unit for unincorporated areas in the county. SPCA of Texas takes stray areas from unincorporated areas of Dallas County but not incorporated areas.

Areas in the City of Dallas are handled by Dallas Animal Services. Balch Springs, Carrollton, Cockrell Hill (short term only), Coppell, Farmers Branch, Garland, Glenn Heights, Irving, Lancaster, Mesquite, Richardson, Seagoville, and Sunnyvale also have their own animal shelters. Cedar Hill, DeSoto, and Duncanville jointly operate the Tri-City Animal Shelter & Adoption Center. Addison does not have an animal shelter.

== See also ==
- Dallas County District Attorney
- List of museums in North Texas
- National Register of Historic Places listings in Dallas County, Texas
- Recorded Texas Historic Landmarks in Dallas County
