= Dallas County Sheriff's Office =

Law enforcement agency of Dallas County

The Dallas County Sheriff's Office is the main law enforcement agency of Dallas County, Texas. It is headed by the Dallas County sheriff. The department was established on March 30, 1846, the same day that the county itself was established. The first sheriff was elected on the very same day. The department has countywide jurisdiction.

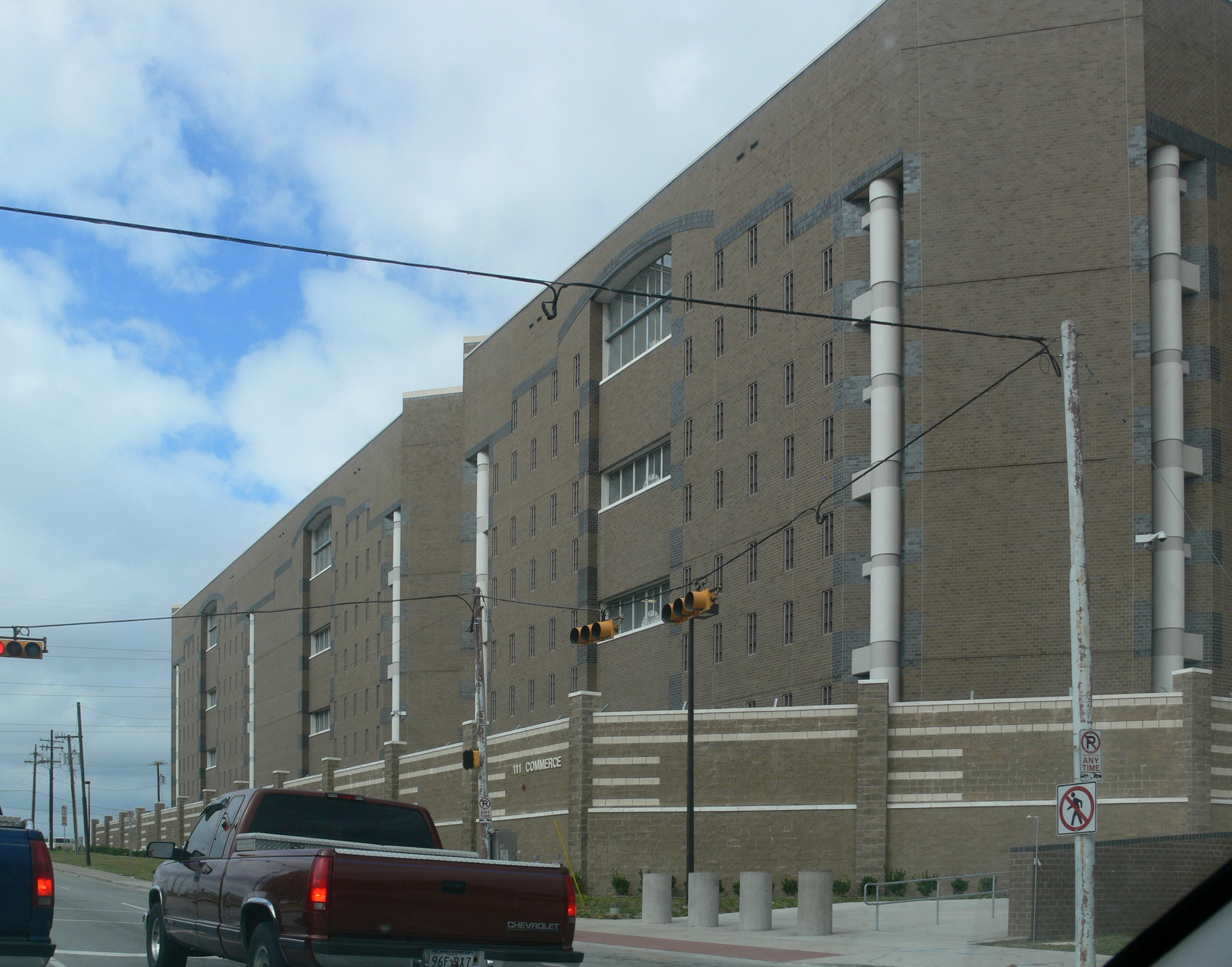
Dallas County Jail facility at 111 West Commerce Street

The department operates the Dallas County Jail system. As of 2026, it is considered the seventh-largest jail in the United States.
