= Clay Jenkins =

American lawyer

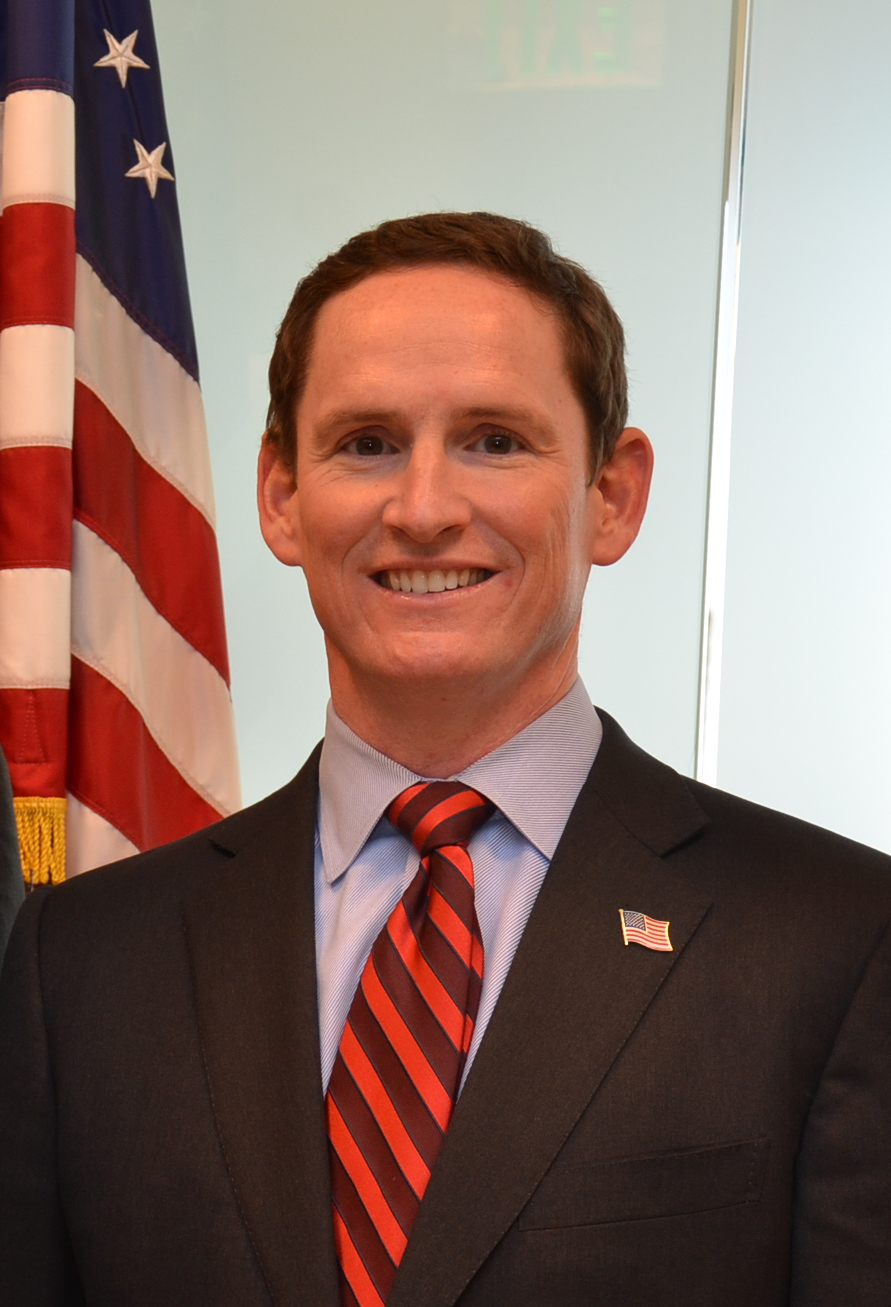
- Jenkins in 2012

Dallas County Judge
- Incumbent
- Assumed office January 1, 2011
- Preceded by: Jim Foster

Personal details
- Born: Clay Lewis Jenkins; March 26, 1964 (age 62) Dallas, Texas, U.S.
- Party: Democratic
- Education: Baylor University (BA, JD)

Clay Lewis Jenkins (born March 26, 1964) is an American lawyer and politician. In 2011, he began serving as county judge for Dallas County, Texas.

== Early life and education ==
Jenkins was born in the Oak Cliff neighborhood of Dallas, Texas to JoAnn and Alvah Clayburn Lewis Jr. His mother was an active member of the Texas Democratic Party and had served as a state delegate from 1978.

After graduating from Waxahachie High School, Jenkins enrolled at Baylor University. While at Baylor University, Jenkins was arrested twice, once for reckless driving, and a second time for trespassing into a women's dorm. After receiving his undergraduate degree, Jenkins attended Baylor Law School and graduated with a Juris Doctor degree.

== Career ==
In March 2010, Jenkins defeated incumbent Jim Foster in the Democratic Party primary election for Dallas County Judge. In the November general election of the same year, Jenkins defeated Republican candidate Wade Emmert to become the county judge.

When Dallas County was hit by an outbreak of West Nile virus in 2012, Jenkins declared a state of emergency for the county and led efforts to spray for mosquitoes.

In 2014, amid a child migrant crisis, Jenkins offered to house as many as two thousand immigrant children who cross the Mexico–United States border in Dallas County. The offer served as a catalyst for a meeting between President Barack Obama and Texas Governor Rick Perry concerning immigration and border security.

Later that year, when Dallas County became the first county in the United States to have a confirmed Ebola virus case, Jenkins led the local response. During the Ebola crisis, Jenkins garnered publicity when he entered the home of Thomas Eric Duncan without personal protective equipment and personally helped Duncan's family move into temporary housing while their house was being decontaminated. Jenkins' widely publicized act was criticized by his political opponents, but won national praise from health officials for destigmatizing the disease by showing that the disease cannot be transmitted between asymptomatic individuals.
