= Liberty Grove, Dallas County, Texas =

Liberty Grove, Texas
- Unincorporated community
- Location within Texas Location within the United States
- Coordinates: 32°57′28″N 96°31′41″W
- Country: United States
- State: Texas
- County: Dallas
- Elevation: 495 ft (151 m)
- Time zone: UTC-6 (Central (CST))
  - Summer (DST): UTC-5 (CDT)
- Area code: 972
- GNIS feature ID: 1378585

Liberty Grove is an unincorporated community in Dallas County, Texas, United States. Liberty Grove was a small farming community at the junction of Farm to Market Road 1880 and a dirt thoroughfare, on Doctors Creek and the South Sulphur River, south of Cooper in south central Delta County.
