= Lupe Valdez =

American law enforcement official

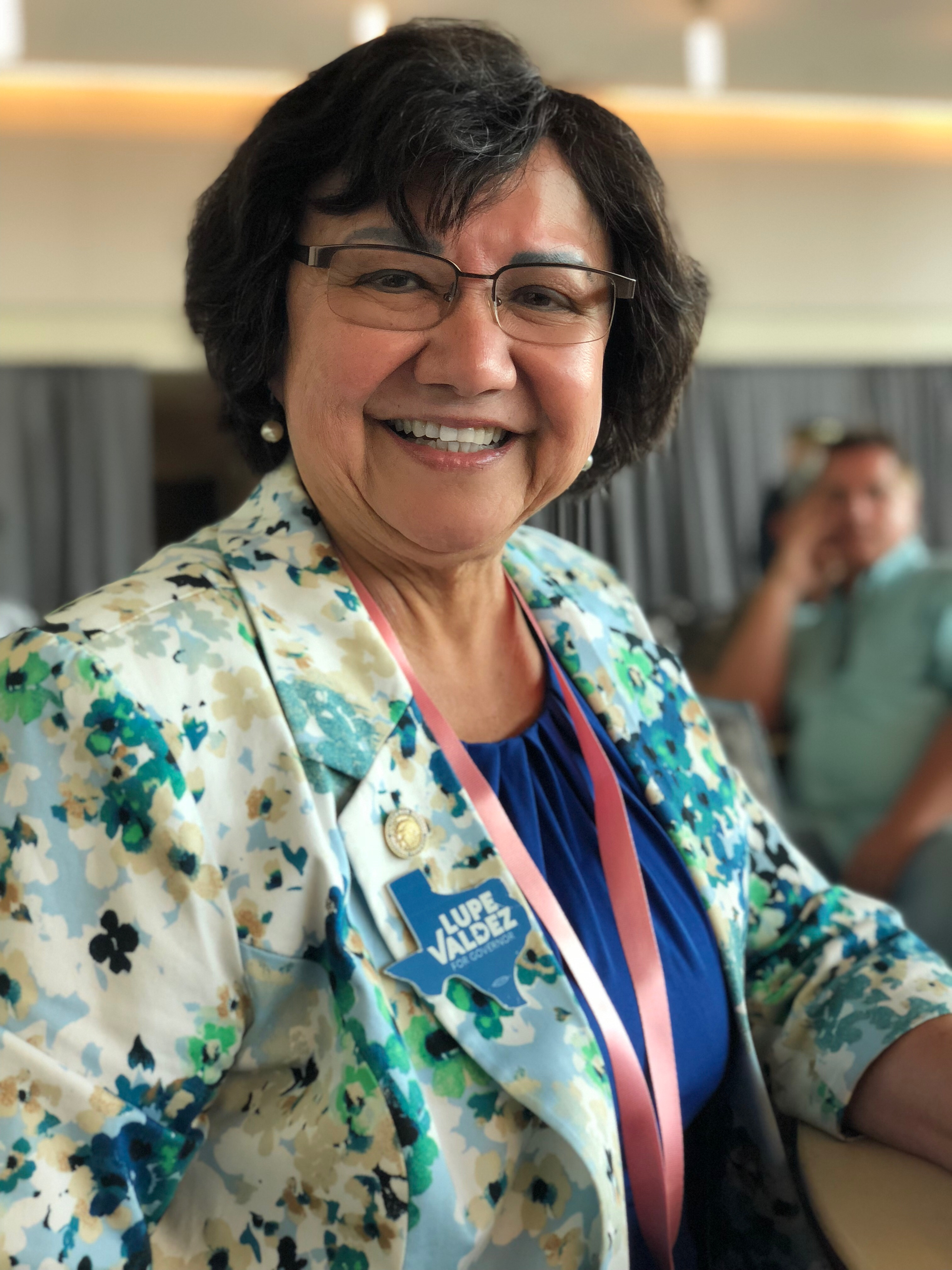
- Valdez in 2018

Dallas County Sheriff
- In office January 1, 2005 – December 6, 2017
- Preceded by: Jim Bowles
- Succeeded by: Marian Brown

Personal details
- Born: Guadalupe Valdez; October 11, 1947 (age 78) San Antonio, Texas, U.S.
- Party: Democratic
- Education: Southern Nazarene University (BA); University of Texas, Arlington (MA)

Military service
- Allegiance: United States
- Branch/service: United States Army
- Rank: Captain

Guadalupe Valdez (born October 11, 1947) is an American law enforcement official who served as the sheriff of Dallas County, Texas, from 2005 to 2017, and was the Democratic nominee for Governor of Texas in the 2018 gubernatorial election, losing to Republican incumbent Greg Abbott.

== Early life ==
Valdez was born and raised in San Antonio, as the youngest of eight children of Mexican-American migrant farm worker parents. She started life by working in the fields but paid her way through college. She earned a bachelor's degree in Business Administration from Southern Nazarene University in Bethany, Oklahoma, and later a master's degree in criminology and criminal justice from the University of Texas at Arlington.

== Early career ==
Prior to entering law enforcement, Lupe Valdez was an officer in the United States Army Reserve, where she attained the rank of captain.

Her law enforcement career began as a jailer, first in a county jail and then in a federal prison. She then moved on to investigative roles as an agent of the General Services Administration, the U.S. Department of Agriculture and, finally, the U.S. Customs Service. With the creation of the Department of Homeland Security in 2002, she was made a Senior Agent, serving in that role until her retirement. In January 2004, Valdez retired to run for the office of Dallas County Sheriff. In 2009, Valdez completed Harvard University's John F. Kennedy School of Government program for Senior Executives in State and Local Government as a David Bohnett LGBTQ Victory Institute Leadership Fellow.

== Political career ==
=== Elections and terms as sheriff ===
On January 2, 2004, Lupe Valdez announced her candidacy for the Democratic nomination for Dallas County Sheriff. During the primary election, she faced three opponents, and finished as the highest vote-getter with 13,867 votes. She subsequently won a run-off election against future Dallas County Judge Jim Foster. Valdez won 73 percent of the vote in the run-off.

As she entered the general campaign, Valdez was widely considered the underdog in her general election race against Republican Danny Chandler. Chandler, a 30-year veteran of the Sheriff's Department, had defeated incumbent Sheriff Jim Bowles in the Republican primary. Bowles, who was tainted by corruption allegations, had held the office for 20 years. As an openly lesbian candidate for public office, Valdez's campaign won the backing of the Gay & Lesbian Victory Fund. The general election saw Valdez beat Chandler by 51.3% to 48.7%, a margin of some 18,000 votes.

She was sworn in on January 1, 2005. Upon taking office as Dallas County Sheriff, Valdez faced a department that was wracked by poor morale, tainted by allegations of corruption and marred by the fact that the Dallas County Jail had begun failing state and federal inspections prior to her election. The jail had failed inspections because of poor sanitation conditions which endanger prisoners, many of whom have not ultimately been found to be guilty of any crime and are merely being held pending being formally charged or, released; a failing smoke evacuation system, unacceptable medical care, and a lack of sufficient guards to meet the legally required guard-to-inmate ratio.

Although the Dallas County Jail had begun failing state and federal inspections prior to Valdez being elected to office, the jail continued to fail inspections every year thereafter until 2010, when the jail passed certification by the State of Texas for the first time since 2003.

Valdez formally filed for re-election to a second term on December 3, 2007. Valdez won the 2008 primary, narrowly avoiding a runoff by winning 50.85% in a four-candidate field on March 4, 2008. On November 4, 2008, Lupe Valdez was re-elected Sheriff of Dallas County with 388,327 votes to Lowell Cannaday's 322,808 votes, a margin of roughly 65,500. Valdez received over 99,000 more votes than the "Straight Democratic" option. She won in precincts across Dallas County, including formerly Republican areas including Valley Ranch in Irving and Mesquite. She began her second four-year term on January 1, 2009.

In 2010, the Dallas County Jails passed inspection by the State of Texas for the first time since 2003. Completion of a new jail facility in 2009 and continued investment from Dallas County were cited as steps towards re-certification of the Dallas County jail system, which passed inspection once again in 2011. Also in 2010, Sheriff Valdez was elected to the Democratic National Committee and was appointed by President Barack Obama to a committee regarding immigration reform.

In November 2012, Valdez won a third term, defeating Republican challenger Kirk Launius. In 2015, Valdez "changed policies on holding immigrants in the Dallas County jail for federal officials once the person is past his or her release date. People who committed minor offenses aren’t held for up to an additional 48 hours for agents of U.S. Immigration and Customs Enforcement, or ICE." This brought a warning from Governor Greg Abbott to "back down from a policy change on federal immigration detention requests."

In November 2016, Valdez won a fourth term with 58 percent of the vote, again defeating Republican Kirk Launius.

In 2024, Valdez ran for Dallas County Sheriff once again. In the March 5 primary, Valdez advanced to the runoff with 38% of the vote, finishing second to incumbent Marian Brown, who received 42% of the vote. Valdez was resoundly defeated in the May 28 runoff, receiving 31% of the vote to Brown's 69%.

=== 2018 Texas gubernatorial election ===
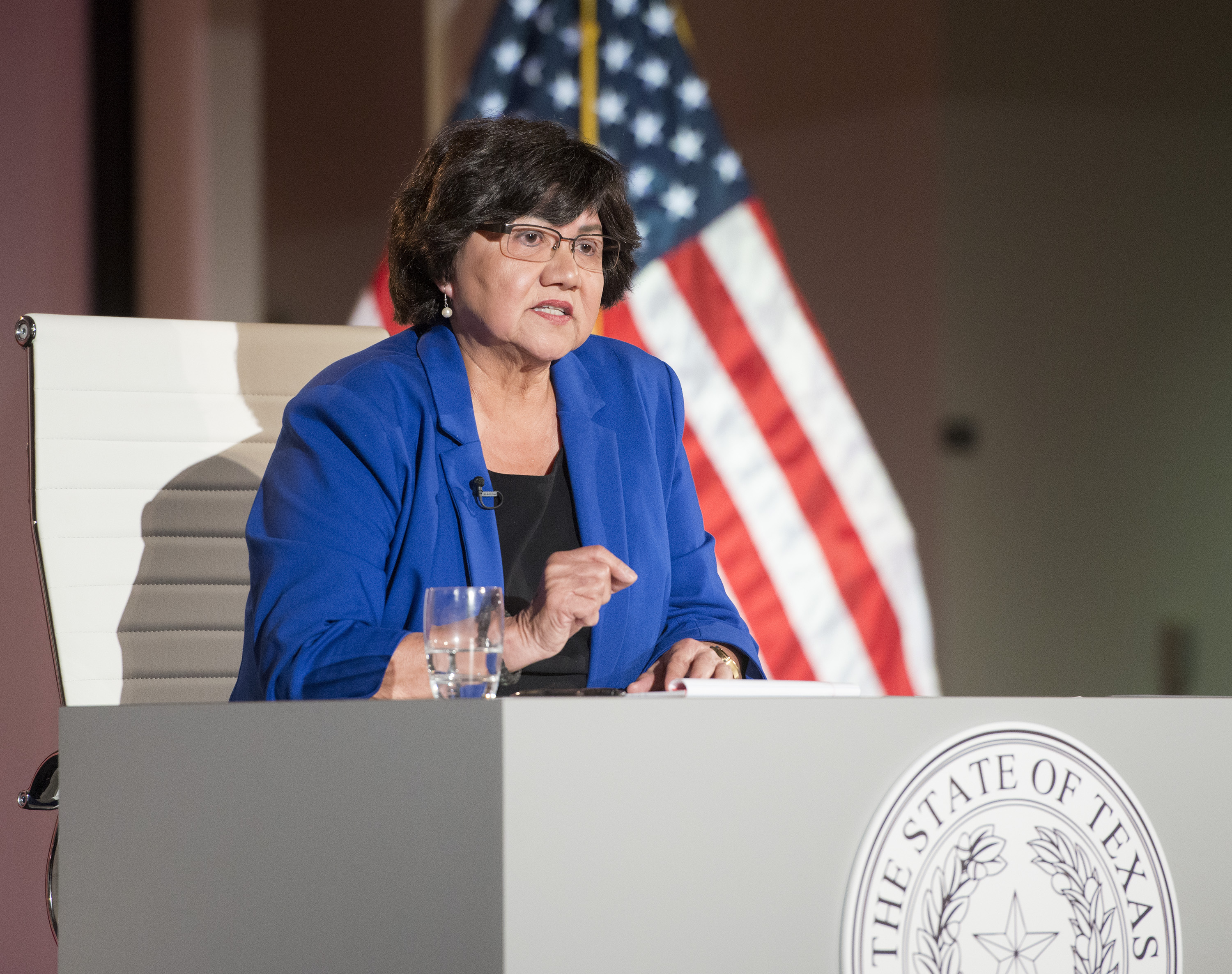
Valdez speaks at the Texas gubernatorial debate at the LBJ Presidential Library in 2018

In December 2017, Valdez announced her candidacy for Governor of Texas in the 2018 gubernatorial election against incumbent Republican governor Greg Abbott. In the March 6 primary, Valdez finished in first place with 43% of the vote, with her closest competitor, Andrew White, son of former Democratic governor Mark White, receiving 27% of the vote. However, under state law, because no candidate reached a majority of the vote, this forced a runoff election against White. In the May 22 runoff, Valdez defeated White by a margin of 53% to 47%, making her the first Latina and first openly gay person nominated for Governor by a major party in the state.

In the general election, Abbott was reelected with 56% of the vote to Valdez's 43%.

== Personal life ==
Valdez is a lesbian. She is in a long term relationship with Lindsey Browning, a chiropractor.

Civic offices
Preceded by Jim Bowles	Sheriff of Dallas County; 2005–2017	Succeeded by Marian Brown
Party political offices
Preceded by Wendy Davis	Democratic nominee for Governor of Texas; 2018	Succeeded by Beto O'Rourke
