= Hord's Ridge, Texas =

Hord's Ridge is a former community in Dallas County, Texas, United States, which later became part of Oak Cliff.
