= Embree, Garland, Texas =

Former city in Dallas County, Texas

Coordinates: 32°55′26″N 96°37′42″W

Embree refers to an area in Garland, Texas, United States that once was its own city in northeastern Dallas County.

In 1891, Embree disincorporated and on March 31 of that year, Garland took the former area of Embree in its city.
