= Andrea Plumlee =

American lawyer and family court judge

Texas 330th District Court
- Incumbent
- Assumed office January 1, 2011
- Preceded by: Marilea Lewis

Personal details
- Party: Democratic
- Education: Southern Methodist University Dedman School of Law (JD)

Andrea Plumlee is an American attorney and elected Texas family court judge, overseeing the 330th Family District Court in Dallas County, Texas. She was first elected in 2010 and re-elected in 2014, 2018 and 2022.

Plumlee earned a J.D. degree from Southern Methodist University Dedman School of Law in 1993.

== See also ==
- Judiciary of Texas
