= Dallas County Sheriff =

Dallas County, Texas, the sheriff heads the Dallas County Sheriff's Office, the county's main law enforcement agency.

The department the sheriff heads was established on March 30, 1846, and the first sheriff was elected on the very same day.

== List of sheriffs ==
List of Sheriffs
Order (#)	Sheriff	Tenure	Note(s)
1st	John Huitt	March 30, 1846–c. 1847	Elected on the same day that the county was established; died in office circa 1847
2nd	Rowland Huitt	Jan.–Aug. 1848	appointed after death of his brother
3rd	William Jenkins	1848–1850	
4th	Trezevant C. Hawpe	1850–1854	
5th	Adam C. Haught	1854–1856	
6th	Burnett M. Henderson	1856–1858	was only 19 years old when elected. Shortly after leaving office was arrested on charges of acting as an agent of the secessionist movement. He was tried by a federal tribunal, and sentenced to death by hanging. Was shot fatally while he was attempting to break out of prison.
7th	Wormley Carter	1858–1860	
8th	Allen Beard	1860–1862	
9th	N.O McAdams	1862–1866	became the first sheriff to serve multiple terms after being re-appointed by the provisional government at the end of the American Civil War
10th	Jeremiah M. Brown	1866	elected; removed as Reconstruction policies were implemented and replaced the county's elected sheriff with an appointed sheriff
11th	Norval M. Winniford	1866–1873	appointed in 1866, elected in 1870; was the first Republican to hold the office, and last Republican to hold it until 1976
12th	James E. Barkley	1873–1876	
13th	William M. Moon	1876–1882	
14th	William H.W. Smith	1882–1886	
14th	William Henry Lewis	1886–1892	first sheriff elected to three terms
15th	Ben Cabell	1892–1900	resigned after being elected mayor of Dallas
16th	Lee H. Hughes	1900–1901	appointed after Cabell's resignation
17th	J. Roll Johnson	1901–1905	
18th	Arther L. Ledbetter	1905–1910	
19th	Ben F. Brandenburg	1910–1914	
20th	Will K. Reynolds	1914–1918	
21st	Don Harston	1914–1924	
22nd	Schuyler Marshall Jr.	1924–1927	
23rd	Allen Seale	1927–May 16, 1928	first sheriff to win election as a write-in; died in office
24th	Lula E. Crouch Seale	1928–1929	appointed in a widow's succession; first woman to hold the office
25th	Hal Hood	1929–1933	
26th	Smoot Schmid	1933–1947	
27th	Bill Decker	1947–August 29, 1970	died in office; first elected in 1947 with opposition, but unopposed in all re-elections subsequent to that'
28th	Clarence Jones	1970–1977	appointed; had been a deputy since 1957
29th	Carl Thomas	1977	second Republican to hold the office and the first to hold it since Reconstruction
30th	Don Byrd	Jan. 1981–Jan. 1985	Republican
31st	James C. Bowles	Jan. 1985–Jan. 2005	Republican
32nd	Lupe Valdez	Jan. 2005–Dec. 6 2017	first woman elected to the office and second to hold it; first Democrat to hold it since 1977
33rd	Marian Brown	2018–present	third woman to hold the office
