= Mesquite Metro Airport =

Public Airport in Dallas, Texas

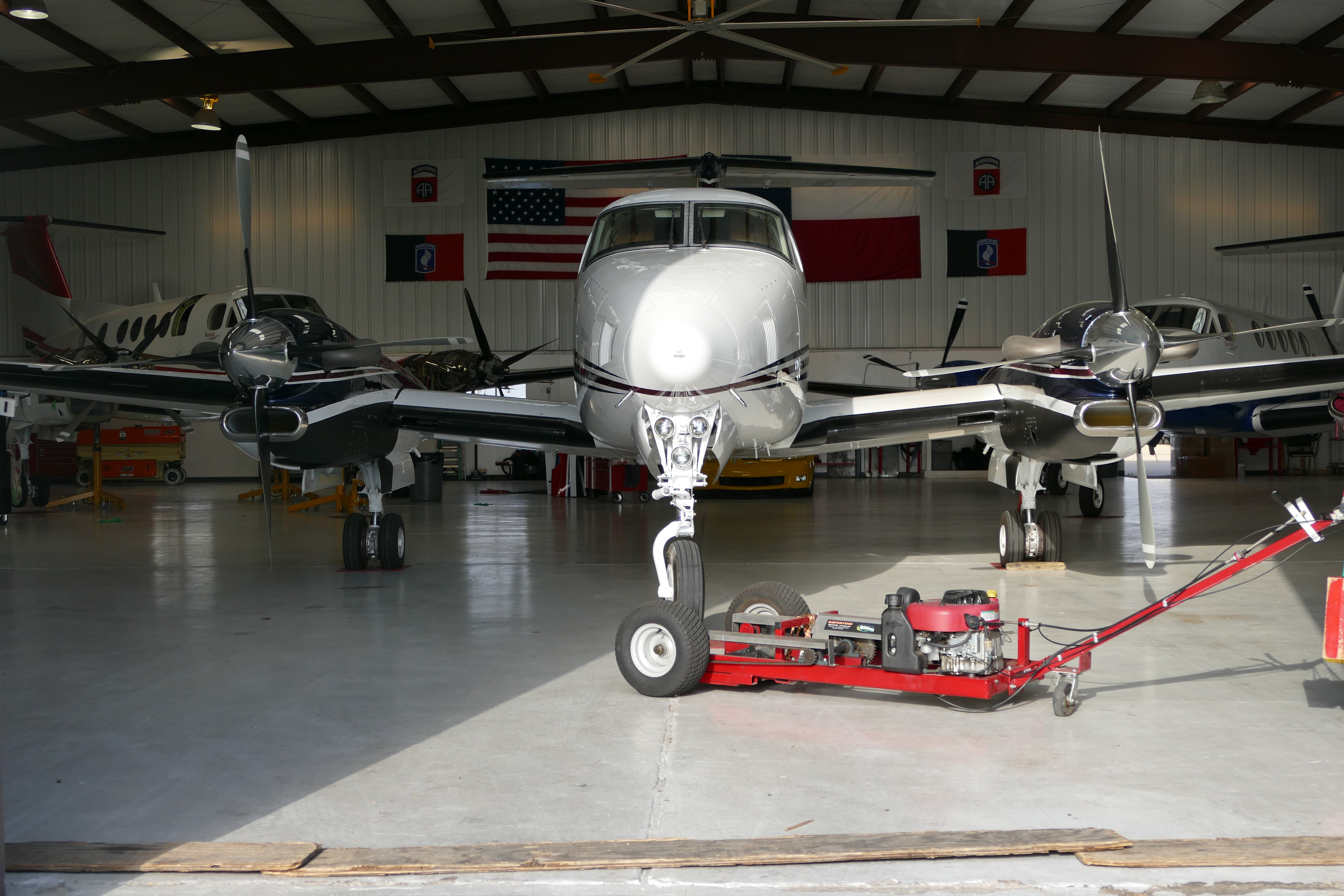
- Mesquite Metro Airport hangar
- IATA: none; ICAO: KHQZ; FAA LID: HQZ

Summary
- Airport type: Public
- Owner: City of Mesquite
- Serves: Mesquite, Texas
- Elevation AMSL: 447 ft / 136 m
- Coordinates: 32°44′49″N 096°31′50″W
- Website: cityofmesquite.com/...

Map

Runways
Direction	Length		Surface
Direction	ft	m	Surface
18/36	6,000	1,829	Concrete

Statistics (2022)
- Aircraft operations: 103,642
- Based aircraft: 182
- Source: Federal Aviation Administration

Mesquite Metro Airport (ICAO: KHQZ, FAA LID: HQZ) is a public use airport in Dallas County, Texas, 3 nautical miles (5.6 km) east of the central business district of Mesquite. The airport is west of the border of Dallas County and Kaufman County.

Most U.S. airports use the same three-letter location identifier for the FAA and IATA, but this airport is HQZ to the FAA and has no IATA code.

== History ==
The airport was built with private funding in 1975 as the Phil L. Hudson Municipal Airport and originally had a 4,000 by 50 foot (1,219 x 15 m) runway. In 1983, the city of Mesquite purchased the airport using grant money from the Federal Aviation Administration (FAA). In 1985, additional federal grants allowed the city to enlarge the runway to 5,000 by 100 feet (1,524 x 30 m), extend the parallel taxiway and acquire more airport property. In 1992 the runway underwent refurbishment and was lengthened by about 1,000 feet (305 m) to its present length of 6,000 feet.

In 2013, the airport added an 80 ft (24 m) tall air traffic control tower at a cost of US$2.8 million. It is permanently staffed by FAA contract air traffic controllers.

== Facilities ==
Mesquite Metro Airport covers 448 acres (181 ha) at an elevation of 447 feet (136 m). Its single runway, 18/36, is 6,000 by 100 feet (1,829 x 30 m), concrete.

In 2022, the airport had 103,642 aircraft operations, an average of 284 per day: 98% general aviation, 1% air taxi, and less than 1% military. 182 aircraft were then based at this airport: 151 single-engine, 20 multi-engine, 10 jet and 1 helicopter.

== Accidents and incidents ==
- 29 May 1999: A Mooney M20B, registration number N74706, collided in mid-air with a Cessna 172P, registration number N96868. A student pilot and flight instructor in the Cessna were conducting practice Instrument Landing System approaches to Runway 17 when the descending Mooney struck the top of their aircraft on final approach. Both aircraft were destroyed in ensuing crashes; the pilot and single passenger in the Mooney were killed, the Cessna pilot suffered minor injuries, and the flight instructor was not injured. The accident was attributed to "The failure by both pilots to maintain visual lookout. A factor was the inadequate radio communications maintained by both pilots while in the traffic pattern."
- 23 November 2007: A Cessna A150K, registration number N8301M, went into a spin after takeoff from Runway 35; the ensuing crash seriously injured the student pilot and killed the flight instructor. Investigators determined that the aircraft had taken off with the wing flaps extended farther than recommended, while the flap operating fuse was the wrong type and was found blown. The accident was attributed to "The flight instructor's failure to maintain sufficient airspeed to avoid a stall during takeoff-initial climb. Factors contributing to the accident are the instructor's decision to takeoff with excessive flaps, the improper maintenance replacement of the flap fuse, and the inability to raise the flaps due to a nonfunctional flap fuse."
- 23 April 2020: The pilot of a Boutique Air Pilatus PC-12, registration number N477SS, reported a loss of engine power after departing from Dallas/Fort Worth International Airport (DFW) on a ferry flight to Alabama. The pilot diverted towards Ralph M. Hall/Rockwall Municipal Airport (F46), only to attempt to return to DFW after reporting that the engine had stabilized. A short time later, the pilot again reported losing engine power, and diverted towards F46 a second time. While en route, air traffic control advised him that he was over Mesquite Metro, and he initiated a 360° turn to land; however, the aircraft stalled and crashed short of the runway, separating both wings and causing a post-crash fire. The pilot, who was the sole aircraft occupant, suffered serious injuries; the aircraft was damaged beyond repair. The cause of accident is under investigation by the National Transportation Safety Board.

== See also ==
- List of airports in Texas
