= Dawson State Jail =

Jail in Dallas, Texas, United States

Coordinates: 32°46′33″N 96°48′56″W

Location in Texas

The Jesse R. Dawson State Jail (JD) was a co-gender nonviolent offender state jail operated by the Corrections Corporation of America owned by the Texas Department of Criminal Justice (TDCJ). It was located in Downtown Dallas, on the banks of the Trinity River.

For a long time, officials from the City of Dallas have advocated for the closure of the jail in order to use the land for the Trinity River Corridor Project. Because of some health-related deaths that occurred before May 2013, the Texas Civil Rights Project, the American Civil Liberties Union (ACLU) and other area groups had advocated for the closure of the jail. The state lawmakers, as well, had wanted the prison closed because the State of Texas had a decrease in its state jail population.

Texas Senator John Whitmire advocated for closing Dawson and the Mineral Wells Pre-Parole Transfer Facility in late 2012. In May 2013 the state government moved to end the $97 million budget for the facility as a way of closing the facility. The facility was closed in August 2013.

The Trinity Park Conservancy purchased the jail for $3 million and set to transform the former prison into the anchor for new Trinity Park with park offices, bike rentals, restrooms, and restaurants.
