= Mesquite, Texas =

- City
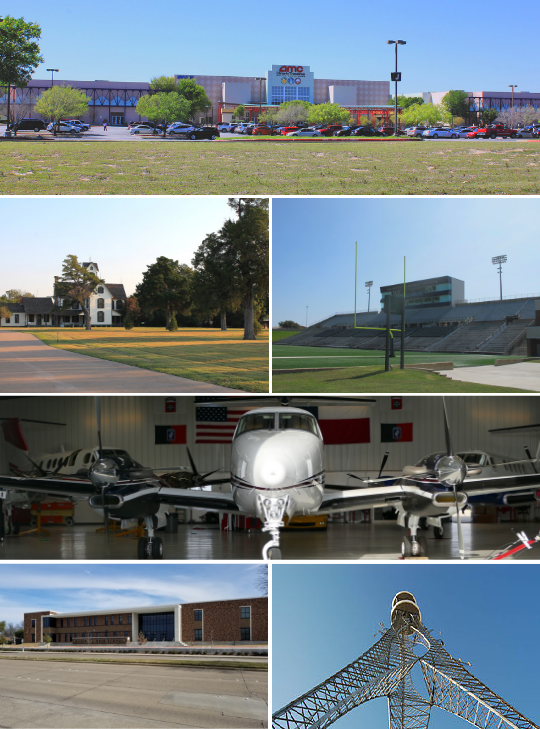
- Top to bottom, left to right: AMC 30 Mesquite, Stephen Decatur Lawrence Farmstead, Mesquite Memorial Stadium, Mesquite Metro Airport hangar, Mesquite High School, and Mesquite Tower

- Logo
- Nickname: Rodeo Capital of Texas
- Motto: Real. Texas. Flavor.
- Location within and around Dallas County
- Coordinates: 32°45′30″N 96°35′12″W
- Country: United States
- State: Texas
- Counties: Dallas, Kaufman
- Founded: May 1873
- Incorporated: December 3, 1887
- Named for: Mesquite Creek

Government
  - Type: Council–manager

Area
  - City: 49.293 sq mi (127.668 km^{2})
  - Land: 49.103 sq mi (127.175 km^{2})
  - Water: 0.191 sq mi (0.495 km^{2})
- Elevation: 495 ft (151 m)

Population (2020)
  - City: 150,108
  - Estimate (2023): 147,317
  - Rank: US: 185th TX: 21st
  - Density: 3,000/sq mi (1,158/km^{2})
  - Urban: 5,732,354 (US: 6th)
  - Metro: 8,100,037 (US: 4th)
- Time zone: UTC–6 (Central (CST))
  - Summer (DST): UTC–5 (CDT)
- ZIP Codes: 75149–75150, 75180–75182, 75185, 75187
- Area codes: 214, 469, 972, and 945
- FIPS code: 48-47892
- GNIS feature ID: 2411090
- Sales tax: 8.25%
- Website: cityofmesquite.com

Mesquite is a city in the U.S. state of Texas, located in Dallas County with portions extending into Kaufman County. The population was 150,108 at the 2020 census, making it the 22nd-most populous city in Texas. Mesquite is positioned at the crossroads of four major highways (Interstates 30, 635, 20, and U.S. Route 80), making locations such as downtown Dallas, Lake Ray Hubbard, Dallas Love Field, and DFW International Airport accessible.

According to legislative action, the city is the "Rodeo Capital of Texas". In 2016, Mesquite received a Playful City USA designation for the fourth year in a row. The city has been named a Tree City USA by the National Arbor Day Foundation for over 25 years. The city of Mesquite holds the 10th-longest reign in all of Texas.

The city of Mesquite is served by its own local airport, Mesquite Metro Airport. Companies and institutions with a major presence in the city are the United Parcel Service, AT&T, Charter Spectrum, Eastfield College, Ashley Furniture, and FedEx.

== History ==
=== Before settlement ===
Centuries before American settlers moved into the area, Mesquite was an open prairie land and a key trading ground for indigenous peoples. The Ionies were a western tribe located close to present-day Fort Worth. The Tawakonies were in present-day Dallas. Finally, the Caddo were the native farmers of the Mesquite land. From 1680 to 1790, after harvest was over, these three tribes held an annual tournament and trading fair.

In 1871 David Walker Florence and Julia Beaty Florence began the Florence Ranch Homestead, located at present day 1424 Barnes Bridge Rd in Mesquite. A successful stock ranch and farm, the initial purchase of 207.5 acres increased to 730 acres by 1892. The original home is now a historic house museum located on 4 acres of park land.

=== Settlement ===
The city of Mesquite was founded on March 14, 1873, on land along the Texas & Pacific Railway, which ran from Dallas to Shreveport, Louisiana. The locals then named the town after Mesquite Creek. The city was officially incorporated on December 3, 1887, after electing Mayor J.E. Russell.

In the city's earliest years, it was known for many outlaws residing in the area. A prominent outlaw was Sam Bass, historically known for his train robberies in Texas. In 1878, he robbed a train in downtown Mesquite, escaping with only $152. Bass missed the $30,000 hidden by the express agent in the unused pot belly stove. The Mesquiter, established in 1882 by R.S. Kimbrough, was Dallas County's longest-running newspaper.

=== Development ===
Mesquite prospered through the late 19th and early 20th centuries as a farming community, growing cotton, hay, corn, and sugarbeets, and using the railroad to ship raw goods. The town remained predominantly agrarian until after World War II, when the suburban boom took root in Mesquite.

In 1946, the Mesquite Rodeo was founded by Charlie Columbus McNally, and was one of the only rodeos that had a permanent location. By the mid-1980s, the events were being broadcast by ESPN.

In 1959, Big Town Mall opened as the first air-conditioned shopping mall in the United States. Portions of the Talking Heads movie 'True Stories' were filmed at this mall. The mall was demolished in the summer of 2006, and FedEx opened a logistics center on the property in 2017.

By 1970, the LBJ Freeway (I-635) was constructed, connecting Mesquite to its neighbors, Garland to the north and Balch Springs to the south. Also, in 1971, Town East Mall was constructed. The mall was used by director Ron Howard to film portions of the movie Cotton Candy in 1978. It can also be seen in drive-by footage in the Talking Heads movie 'True Stories', by Talking Heads frontman David Byrne. The mall's associated traffic and shops would continue to grow the town.

In 1986, the Mesquite Arena opened its doors as the new home for the Mesquite ProRodeo. By 1998, the facility was expanded to include a convention center, exhibition hall, and a Hampton Inn and Suites.

By the 1990 census, the city had grown to 101,484 people, up from 1,696 residents in 1950.

In 2011, Mesquite passed a law allowing beer and wine sales in the city. The measure had been considered several times for many years, but was always blocked by strong protest against the proposed sales. It was one of the few cities without beer and wine sales in eastern Dallas County before the law came into effect.

In June 2015, the Mesquite Arts Center added a Freedom Park exhibit, in memorial of September 11. The park displays a 15-foot (4.6 m) beam that was recovered from the remains of Ground Zero. The Mesquite Fire Department received the beam in 2011.

== Geography ==
Mesquite is located in eastern Dallas County with a portion extending east into Kaufman County. The city is bordered to the west by Dallas, to the north by Garland, to the northeast by Sunnyvale, to the south by Seagoville and Dallas, and to the southwest by Balch Springs.

According to the United States Census Bureau, the city has a total area of 49.293 square miles (127.67 km^{2}), of which, 49.102 square miles (127.17 km^{2}) is land and 0.191 square miles (0.49 km^{2}) is water. Mesquite is part of the Dallas–Fort Worth–Arlington metroplex, in which one quarter of all Texans live.

=== Neighborhoods ===
- Lawson
- Country Meadows
- Samuell Farms
- Meadow Creek
- Parkview
- Broadmoor Estates
- Old Broadmoor Estates
- Crooked Lane
- Fuentes
- Eastern Heights
- Edgemont Park
- Creek Crossing
- Rutherford
- Falcon's Lair
- Falcon's Ridge
- Pecan Creek
- Rollingwood Hills
- Skyline
- Big Town Estates
- Presidential Estates
- Pasadena Gardens
- Original Town
- Melton
- Tealwood
- Northridge
- Quail Hollow
- Wildwood
- Valley Creek
- Idle wood
- Meadowview
- Palos Verdes
- Hagan Hill
- Mesquite Park
- Casa View Heights
- Solterra Texas

=== Climate ===
As a part of the DFW area, Mesquite has a humid subtropical climate (Köppen climate classification Cfa) characteristic of the Southern Plains of the United States. It is also continental, characterized by a relatively wide annual temperature range. Located at the lower end of Tornado Alley, Mesquite and the rest of Dallas–Fort Worth are prone to extreme weather.

On average, the warmest month is July. The highest recorded temperature in Mesquite was 112 °F (44 °C) in 1980. The average coolest month is January. The lowest recorded temperature was 1 °F (−17 °C) in 1989. May is the average wettest month.

== Demographics ==
Mesquite city, Texas – Racial and ethnic composition Note: the US Census treats Hispanic/Latino as an ethnic category. This table excludes Latinos from the racial categories and assigns them to a separate category. Hispanics/Latinos may be of any race.
Race / Ethnicity (NH = Non-Hispanic)	Pop 2000	Pop 2020	% 2000	% 2020		
White (NH)	81,388	58,215	37,797	65.36%	41.63%	25.18%
Black or African American (NH)	16,422	30,019	37,007	13.19%	21.47%	24.65%
Native American or Alaska Native (NH)	620	520	452	0.50%	0.37%	0.30%
Asian (NH)	4,634	4,430	4,207	3.72%	3.17%	2.80%
Pacific Islander (NH)	62	77	67	0.05%	0.06%	0.04%
Some Other Race (NH)	153	175	441	0.12%	0.13%	0.29%
Mixed race or Multi-Racial (NH)	1,744	2,255	3,865	1.40%	1.61%	2.57%
Hispanic or Latino	19,500	44,133	66,272	15.66%	31.56%	44.15%
Total	124,523	139,824	150,108	100.0%	100.0%	100.00%

Historical population
Census	Pop.	Note	%±
1890	135		—
1900	406		200.7%
1910	687		69.2%
1920	674		−1.9%
1930	729		8.2%
1940	1,045		43.3%
1950	1,696		62.3%
1960	27,526		1,523.0%
1970	55,131		100.3%
1980	67,053		21.6%
1990	101,484		51.3%
2000	124,523		22.7%
2010	139,824		12.3%
2020	150,108		7.4%
2023 (est.)	147,317		−1.9%
U.S. Decennial Census; 2020 Census

As of the 2020 census, there were 150,108 people, 50,123 households, and 36,989 families residing in the city. The population density was 3,096.1 inhabitants per square mile (1,195.4/km^{2}). There were 52,615 housing units. The racial makeup of the city was 33.5% White, 25.1% African American, 1.4% Native American, 2.9% Asian, 0.1% Pacific Islander, 19.9% from some other races and 17.2% from two or more races. Hispanic or Latino of any race were 44.1% of the population. 28.0% of residents were under the age of 18, 7.4% were under 5 years of age, and 11.4% were 65 and older.

As of the 2010 census, there were 139,824 people, 48,586 households, and 34,641 families residing in the city. The population density was 3,038.3 inhabitants per square mile (1,173.1/km^{2}). There were 51,952 housing units. The racial makeup of the city was 59.0% White, 21.8% African American, 0.8% Native American, 3.2% Asian, 0.1% Pacific Islander, 11.9% from some other races and 3.1% from two or more races. Hispanic or Latino of any race were 31.6% of the population.

As of the 2000 census, there were 124,523 people, 43,926 households, and 32,900 families residing in the city. The population density was 1,107.3/km² (2,868.1/mi²). There were 46,245 housing units at an average density of 411.2/km² (1,065.2/mi²). The racial makeup of the city was 73.54% White, 13.32% African American, 0.60% Native American, 3.75% Asian, 0.05% Pacific Islander, 6.43% from other races, and 2.31% from two or more races. Hispanic or Latino of any race were 15.66% of the population.

There were 43,926 households out of which 43.1% had children under the age of 18 living with them, 56.4% were married couples living together, 14.0% had a female householder with no husband present, and 25.1% were non-families. 20.6% of all households were made up of individuals and 4.9% had someone living alone who was 65 years of age or older. The average household size was 2.82 and the average family size was 3.27.

In the city the population was spread out with 30.5% under the age of 18, 9.2% from 18 to 24, 33.9% from 25 to 44, 19.3% from 45 to 64, and 7.1% who were 65 years of age or older. The median age was 32 years. For every 100 females there were 93.0 males. For every 100 females age 18 and over, there were 89.2 males.

The median income for a household in the city was $50,424, and the median income for a family was $56,357. Males had a median income of $37,756 versus $29,905 for females. The per capita income for the city was $20,890. About 5.0% of families and 6.8% of the population were below the poverty line, including 8.8% of those under age 18 and 6.6% of those age 65 or over.

According to information gathered by Sperling's BestPlaces, 62.7% claim religious affiliation. Christianity is the most prevalent religion in Mesquite. The largest Christian body in the city is the Catholic Church, served by the Diocese of Dallas (19.6%), followed by Baptists (13.2%), Methodists (4.8%), Pentecostals (3.1%), Presbyterians (1.6%), Episcopalians (1.0%), Latter-Day Saints (1.0%), Lutherans (0.7%), and 12.4% from another Christian faith including the Oriental Orthodox and Eastern-rite Catholic churches. Mesquite is a center for Indian Christians from the Indian state of Kerala. Their settlement, one of the earliest of the Indian Americans in the DFW area, was influenced by proximity to Dallas-based hospitals such as Baylor University Medical Center at Dallas and Parkland Hospital, as well as having initial low income and difficulties moving to mostly white northern suburbs. The second-largest religion in Mesquite is Islam (3.6%) followed by Judaism (0.7%), and eastern faiths including Hinduism, Sikhism, and Buddhism (0.9%).

== Economy ==
Much of Mesquite's economy is tied to the city of Dallas with the exception of local businesses.

A battery factory opened in 2025.

=== Top Employers ===
According to the City's 2023 Annual Comprehensive Financial Report, the largest employers in the city are:

#	Employer	Type of Business	# of Employees
1	Mesquite Independent School District	Education	1,000+
2	Town East Mall	Enclosed Shopping Mall	1,000+
3	United Parcel Service Inc.	Package Delivery Company	1,000+
4	Canadian Solar	Renewable Energy Company	1,000+
5	City of Mesquite	Government	1,000+
6	Pepsi Bottling Group	Food and Beverage Industry	500-999
7	Dallas Regional Medical Center (formerly Mesquite Community Hospital)	Medical Hospital	500-999
8	Eastfield College	Higher Education	500-999
9	Walmart Supercenter	Retail	500-999
10	Ashley Furniture	Manufactures, Distributes, and Markets Furniture	500-999
—	Total employers	—	80,210

== Arts and culture ==
In 2016, the Mesquite Public Library System was presented with a 2016 Achievement of Library Excellence Award by the Texas Municipal Library Directors Association. Of the 548 public library systems in Texas, the Mesquite Public Library was one of only 43 libraries to earn this prestigious honor. The Mesquite Public Library System consists of two branches to serve the community. Both branches offer traditional and non-traditional programs.

== Parks and recreation ==
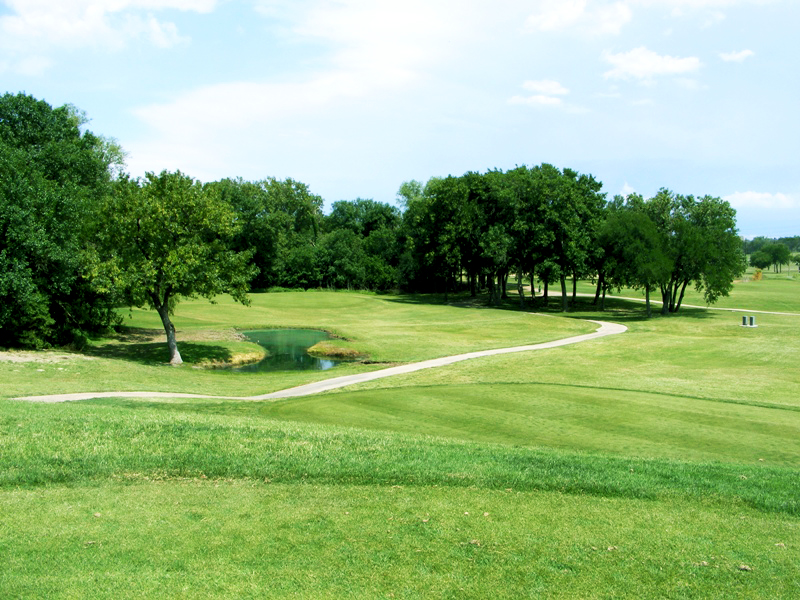
Mesquite Golf Club

The city houses 76 parks and four recreation centers. The city has been designated a Playful City USA four years running and opened its Heritage Trail system in 2015. The hike and bike trail system consists of 4.25 miles of concrete trails and sidewalks, three trailheads, and other improvements that connect residents from their homes to the Mesquite Golf Club, schools, recreation centers, sports fields, shopping, and more.

=== Mesquite Golf Club ===
Mesquite Golf Club is a 154-acre (62 ha), 18-hole golf course for both novice and expert golfers. Operated by the City of Mesquite, the course is open seven days a week and features a pro shop and driving range.

=== Mesquite Arts Center ===
The 36,700-square-foot (3,410 m^{2}) municipal arts facility houses a 494-seat music performance hall, black box theater, rehearsal hall, galleries, and support space. The facility serves as the cultural center for the community and is home to the Mesquite Community Theatre, Mesquite Community Band and the Mesquite Symphony Orchestra.

== Government ==
The city council of Mesquite consists of a mayor and six council members, with Daniel Alemán Jr. serving as mayor and Cliff Keheley as city manager.

The council members of Mesquite's city council are listed below.

Position	Occupant
Mayor	Daniel Alemán Jr.
City manager	Cliff Keheley
Assistant City Manager	Chris Sanchez
District 1	Jeff Casper
District 2	Kenny Green
District 3	Jennifer Vidler
District 4	Andrew Hubacek
District 5	B.W. Smith
District 6	Brandon Murden

== Politics ==
Mesquite city vote by party in Presidential elections
Year	Democratic	Republican	Third Parties
2020	60.39% 28,762	38.23% 18,209	1.38% 660

== Education ==
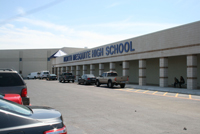
North Mesquite High School

Public High Schools
Name	Year founded	Size	Mascot	Principal
Mesquite High School	1901	6A	Stormy the Skeeter	Jeff Johnson
North Mesquite High School	1969	5A	Stallion	T.J. Reed
West Mesquite High School	1976 (initially as middle school)	5A	Wrangler	Dr. Jordan Simmons
Poteet High School	1986	5A	Pirate	Kelly Long
John Horn High School	2000	6A	Jaguar	Deeadra Brown
Vanguard High School	2021	N/A	Vanguard	Clinton Elsasser

Mesquite Independent School District provides primary and secondary (K–12) education to most areas of Mesquite. A small portion of Mesquite is served by Dallas Independent School District. While another small area in Kaufman County is within the Forney Independent School District, the section has no residents. Mesquite also serves an area of Balch Springs.

In addition to 33 public elementary schools and ten public middle schools, Mesquite is served by five high schools: Mesquite High School, North Mesquite High School, West Mesquite High School, Poteet High School, and John Horn High School. The private Dallas Christian School is located in the city limits.

=== Colleges and universities ===
The Texas Legislature defines all of Dallas County (including the vast majority of Mesquite) as being in the Dallas College (formerly Dallas County Community College or DCCCD) district. The portion in Kaufman County is within the Trinity Valley Community College district. Eastfield College provides undergraduate degrees and continuing-education credits as part of Dallas College.

Higher education also is provided by two other institutions. Columbia College-Mesquite Campus is located on the Eastfield College campus. It is a private, nonprofit institution that was founded in Columbia, Missouri, in 1851. It provides bachelor's and master's degree programs.

== Media ==
Mesquite is in the Dallas/Fort Worth television and radio market. The Mesquite Independent School District operates KEOM, a high-school sports and classic-hits radio station. The city's newspaper community primarily subscribes to The Dallas Morning News, Al Dia, and other Dallas-based newspapers. The Dallas Morning News has a section dedicated to local news in Mesquite. Star Local News distributes the Mesquite News newspaper.

== Transportation ==
Mesquite is served by a publicly owned and operated airport, Mesquite Metro Airport. The airport includes a 6,000-foot (1,800 m) lighted runway with ILS. General aviation accounts for about 75% of daily operations, while commercial aviation accounts for the rest. Mesquite Metro Airport is popular among transient aircraft due to its location near Dallas and favorable fuel prices.

Two other nearby airports, Dallas/Fort Worth International Airport and Dallas Love Field, provide regular commercial passenger service to the region. Dallas Love Field is around 15 miles (24 km) from Mesquite; DFW Airport is roughly 30 miles (48 km) from Mesquite.

Mesquite is not a member of Dallas Area Rapid Transit, but on April 12, 2011, the DART Board changed its policy to permit DART to contract with nonmember cities for services, such as passenger rail and express service. The city and DART staffs have developed a coordinated plan to have a weekday commuter service in operation between the Hanby Stadium visitor parking lot and the DART's Green Line Lawnview Station. This route opened March 12, 2012. The city also has an optional public transportation service where citizens can schedule specific pickup and drop off times and locations within Mesquite through the STAR Transit service.

Union Pacific Railroad operates an intermodal facility for its freight rail service as part of the Skyline Industrial Park. The recent expansion of this intermodal facility won a Silver award in the Industrial Paving Category by the American Concrete Pavement Association.

=== Highways ===
- Interstate 20 is a major east–west interstate serving the south side of Mesquite passing through rural and residential areas including the Lawson area. I-20 connects with Balch Springs to the west and Terrell to the east.
- Interstate 30 is a major east–west interstate that passes through the north side of Mesquite. I-30 connects with Dallas, Arlington, and Fort Worth to the west; Garland, Lake Ray Hubbard, and Rockwall to the east.
- Interstate 635 (Lyndon B. Johnson Freeway) is an auxiliary interstate serving as a partial loop around Dallas and its suburbs. I-635 bisects the city of Mesquite and serves as the main freeway through the city as most of the local businesses and attractions (including Town East Mall and Mesquite Championship Rodeo) are built near or around I-635. The interstate connects with Garland to the north and Balch Springs to the south. I-635 also connects Mesquite with Dallas/Fort Worth International Airport.
- U.S. Highway 80 is an east–west freeway passing through north Mesquite. US 80 connects with Sunnyvale, Forney, and Terrell to the east. To the west of Mesquite, the highway merges onto I-30.
- Texas Highway 352 (Military Parkway/Scyene Road) is an east–west highway passing through both west Mesquite and downtown Mesquite. In the downtown area, it is known locally as Main Street on the westbound section and Davis Street on the eastbound section.
- Belt Line Road also passes through Mesquite and serves as a major road. Belt Line Road serves as an outer loop around the Dallas suburbs.
- Planning stages and environmental studies are being conducted to expand President George Bush Turnpike to connect from its current terminus at I-30 in Garland to I-20. The new segment of the toll road would pass through Sunnyvale and Mesquite in route to I-20 and would complete the loop around Dallas County.

== Notable people ==
- Dave Abruzzese, ex-drummer for Pearl Jam
- Quincy Acy, professional basketball player for Brooklyn Nets and New York Knicks
- Melissa Archer, actress on One Life to Live
- Bradlee Baladez, soccer player
- Todd Boatwright, television news anchor
- Joe Bowden, former professional football player
- Craig Wayne Boyd, winner of season seven of NBC's The Voice
- Trevone Boykin, quarterback for NFL's Seattle Seahawks
- Tarell Brown, professional football player for New England Patriots
- John D. Carmack, game programmer and co-founder of id Software
- Ray Cunningham, former professional baseball player for St. Louis Cardinals
- Alyssa Edwards, drag performer and dance instructor, winner of RuPaul's Drag Race Global All Stars
- Terry Fator, singer and ventriloquist, winner of America's Got Talent in 2007
- Taylor Gabriel, professional football player for Chicago Bears
- Don Gay, eight-time PRCA world champion bullrider
- Todd Graham, college football coach; head coach at Hawaii
- Jerry Hall, actress and model, former wife of Mick Jagger
- Hannah Jadagu, singer
- Jason Jennings, Major League Baseball player
- Micah Xavier Johnson, perpetrator of 2016 shooting of Dallas police officers
- Ty Jordan, football player
- Taylor Lipsett, gold medalist in sled hockey at 2010 Winter Paralympic Games
- Sean Lowe, MLB player
- Damien Magnifico, MLB player
- Taylor Parks, actress and singer
- Anthony Simonsen, professional ten-pin bowler
- Sonny Strait, voice actor, ADR director, comic book/anime writer and illustrator
- Greg Vaughan, actor on General Hospital
- Chuck Weber, racing driver
- Ralph Barbosa, comedian
