= History of Dallas (1839–1855) =

The history of Dallas, Texas, United States, from 1839 to 1855 concerns the city's original settlement and the establishment of Dallas County.

== Settlement ==
John Neely Bryan, looking for a good trading post to serve Native Americans and settlers, first surveyed the Dallas area in 1839. Bryan, who shared Sam Houston's insight into the wisdom of Native American customs, must have realized that Caddo trails he came across intersected at one of the few natural fords for hundreds of kilometers along the wide Trinity floodplain. At what became known as "Bryan's Bluff", the river, which was an impassable barrier of mud and water between late fall and early spring, narrowed like an hourglass where it crossed a ridge of Austin chalk, providing a hard rock ford that became the natural north–south route between Republic of Texas settlements and those of the expanding United States. Bryan also knew that the planned Preston Trail was to run near the ford — the north–south route and the ford at Bryan's Bluff became more important when the United States annexed Texas in 1845.

After Bryan surveyed the area, he returned home to Arkansas. While there, The Treaty of Birds Fort was signed, removing all Native Americans from Northern Texas. When he returned in November 1841, half of his customers, the Native Americans, were gone. He decided that instead of creating a trading post, he would create a permanent settlement, which he founded the same month. About 22 miles (35 km) to the northwest of his settlement was a community called Bird's Fort — Bryan invited the settlers there to live in Dallas at his proposed city. John Beeman arrived in April 1842 and he planted the first corn. Other families soon followed suit, including members of the Peter's Colony settlement nearby.

John Neely Bryan was originally almost everything to Dallas: he was the postmaster, a storeowner, a ferry operator (he operated a ferry where Commerce Street crosses the Trinity River today), and his home served as the courthouse. In 1843, the first doctor arrived in Dallas; in 1845, the first lawyer made his home there. In 1845, the first election was held in Dallas over Texas' annexation into the United States. Of the 32 citizens eligible to vote, 29 voted for annexation and 3 voted against it.

== Establishment ==
In 1844, John Neely Bryan convinced J. P. Dumas to survey and lay out a 0.5 square mile (1.3 km^{2}) section of blocks and streets near what later became downtown Dallas. The establishment was named Dallas, and though it has been largely assumed that it was named after George Mifflin Dallas, who became vice president the following March, there are problems with this theory. George M. Dallas lived in Philadelphia and never traveled very far west of the city, and Bryan had never traveled very far east of Memphis. It is doubtful that the two ever met, and there are at least seven other candidates:

- Named after George M. Dallas's brother Alexander James Dallas, a U.S. Navy commodore who was stationed in the Gulf of Mexico;
- Named after George's and Alexander's father, Alexander James Dallas, who was the United States Secretary of the Treasury around the end of the War of 1812;
- Named in a town-naming contest in 1842;
- Named after a friend of founder John Neely Bryan. His son later stated that Bryan claimed to have named the town "after my friend Dallas" (a person whose identity is not certain). John Neely Bryan later died in a psychiatric ward, so his "friend" may not have been a real person;
- Named after Joseph Dallas, who settled near Dallas in 1843;
- Named after "Dallas", the modern version of the Scottish Gaelic word "Dalais" which means 'valley of water';
- Named after the Scottish village of Dallas, in Moray, after which a number of places worldwide are named.

Dallas County was established in 1846 and the city of Dallas was set as the temporary county seat. In 1850, Dallas became the permanent seat over Cedar Springs and Hord's Ridge (Oak Cliff), both of which now lie within the city's limits.
