= Sunnyvale, Texas =

- Town
- Location within Dallas County and the state of Texas
- Coordinates: 32°48′13″N 96°34′11″W
- Country: United States
- State: Texas
- County: Dallas

Government
  - Mayor: Saji George

Area
  - Total: 16.79 sq mi (43.49 km^{2})
  - Land: 16.52 sq mi (42.78 km^{2})
  - Water: 0.27 sq mi (0.71 km^{2})
- Elevation: 486 ft (148 m)

Population (2020)
  - Total: 7,893
  - Density: 414/sq mi (159.9/km^{2})
- Time zone: UTC-6 (CST)
  - Summer (DST): UTC-5 (CDT)
- ZIP code: 75182
- Area codes: 214, 469, 945, 972
- FIPS code: 48-71156
- GNIS feature ID: 1348079
- Website: townofsunnyvale.org

Sunnyvale is a town in Dallas County, Texas, United States. It is the easternmost city completely within Dallas County. The population was 7,893 in 2020.

== History ==
The area now occupied by Sunnyvale was inhabited by various Native American tribes in the years before the European conquest of the Americas. It came under the rule of Spain in the 18th century, very close to the boundary of Spanish and French territory (although this boundary was carried upward a bit in 1819; see Adams-Onís Treaty). During this time, the area was relatively underdeveloped. However, some settlers migrated to Texas and would eventually settle in Sunnyvale.

In 1821, the area became a possession of Mexico when Mexico received its independence from Spain. After the Texas Revolution, the area once again changed hands, under the Republic of Texas. This is when the town started to develop. During this time, settlers migrated to present-day Sunnyvale, naming the hamlet they founded Long Creek. In 1845 Texas became a U.S. state.

As more people arrived, eventually three new hamlets sprang up in the area: New Hope, Tripp, and Hatterville. New Hope was the most prosperous of these. It had many shops and stores, a fair called Gala Days, and a newspaper, the New Hope News. It was neighboring Mesquite's biggest rival. This all ended in 1921, when a storm blew the town away. Many buildings were damaged and the prosperous days were over. From this year on to the 1950s, the four towns had no new developments, remaining stagnant.

In the year 1953, the hamlets of Hatterville, New Hope, Long Creek, and Tripp merged under the name Sunnyvale. The name was chosen in a contest from a local school. Since, there are many reminders of Sunnyvale's rich history, like the old New Hope School; the Tripp First Baptist Church, built in 1882; and many antique houses. The Long Creek Cemetery in southern Sunnyvale is over 150 years old, and the first recorded burial there is that of Leona Crownover Caldwell, dated October 2, 1855. The city incorporation in 1953 allowed only single-family houses on 1-acre lots (0.40 ha).

On December 26, 2015, the town was struck by an EF-4 tornado causing extensive damage to the Plantation RV park, the tornado then grew and moved northeast into Garland and Rowlett killing 12 people and injuring many.

On June 5, 2023, Sunnyvale made national headlines after story broke of a mass shooting incident. According to Sunnyvale Police, a family of five were shot. A woman was killed and four children were injured.

== Geography ==
Sunnyvale is located at 32°48′13″N 96°34′11″W (32.803646, –96.569654). According to the United States Census Bureau, the town has a total area of 16.8 square miles (44 km^{2}), all land.

== Demographics ==
Historical population
Census	Pop.	Note	%±
1960	967		—
1970	995		2.9%
1980	1,404		41.1%
1990	2,228		58.7%
2000	2,693		20.9%
2010	5,130		90.5%
2020	7,893		53.9%
U.S. Decennial Census

Sunnyvale racial composition as of 2020 (NH = Non-Hispanic) (Note: Note: the US Census treats Hispanic/Latino as an ethnic category. This table excludes Latinos from the racial categories and assigns them to a separate category. Hispanics/Latinos can be of any race.)
Race	Number	Percentage
White (NH)	3,897	49.37%
Black or African American (NH)	801	10.15%
Native American or Alaska Native (NH)	27	0.34%
Asian (NH)	2,012	25.49%
Pacific Islander (NH)	9	0.11%
Some Other Race (NH)	48	0.61%
Mixed/Multi-Racial (NH)	248	3.14%
Hispanic or Latino	851	10.78%
Total	7,893	

Sunnyvale had a population of 969 in 1960, only to increase to 5,130 at the 2010 census. In 2020, its population increased by 53.9% to 7,893 residents.

Once an overwhelmingly non-Hispanic white community, the 2020 U.S. census determined 49.37% of the population were non-Hispanic white; this reflected nationwide and statewide demographic trends of diversification prominent in the beginning of the 21st century. Asian Americans increased to 25.49% of the population, and Hispanic or Latinos of any race were 10.78%; Black and African Americans grew to 10.15% of the local population, followed by multiracial Americans at 3.14%. American Indians and Alaska Natives were 0.34% of the population; some other race 0.61%; and Pacific Islanders made up 0.11%.

== Government and infrastructure ==
The town council includes six members and the mayor. As of September 2020, Saji George is the mayor of Sunnyvale. As of the same year the council members are Ryan Finch, Kevin Clark, Manu Danny, Mark Eldridge, Larry Allen, and Jonathan Freeman.

In 2000 a U.S. district court ruled that Sunnyvale had enacted planning and zoning practices that were in place to exclude the development of apartments and small single family lots. Sunnyvale and the Inclusive Communities Project (ICP) entered into an agreement in which Sunnyvale was given three years to identify 70 housing units favorable for purchase or rent by low income individuals and families. Since 2008, three developers have considered low income developments in Sunnyvale, but no applications have been filed with the Town. ICP filed a lawsuit against Sunnyvale in 2009, seeking the development of low income units at a site in Sunnyvale. Sunnyvale's government responded, saying that it had taken appropriate steps to approve the creation of low income housing.

"The Town of Sunnyvale received an order from Honorable Judge Reed O'Connor regarding the Dews vs Town of Sunnyvale case, finding the Town in contempt of court for its failure to implement the Settlement Stipulation in the case by April 15, 2008. The Town has reviewed, and understands Judge O'Connor's order, yet is clearly disappointed in the ruling, because the Town believes that it did all that was possible to comply with the settlement under the circumstances. But Judge Reed O'Connor found the Town guilty of contempt of court and the town has to July 15, 2011, to comply and make available 70 low income units that qualifies for section 8 vouchers.

In October 2019, the Sunnyvale Police Department was established and began the start-up phase of standing up a new Police Department. The Town was contracted with the Dallas County Sheriff's Office for many years, and they continued to provide law enforcement services to the Town of Sunnyvale through October 2020, when Sunnyvale Police Department took over operations.

Sunnyvale is in Texas State House District 112, represented by Republican Angie Chen Button. Sunnyvale is in Texas Senate District 2, represented by Republican Senator Bob Hall.

== Education ==
Sunnyvale Independent School District takes students in Sunnyvale who are in grades pre-kindergarten through 12. Sunnyvale High School's facility opened in 2009.

Prior to fall 2007, Sunnyvale did not operate a high school; for high school Sunnyvale's students were zoned to the Mesquite Independent School District (MISD), attending North Mesquite High School.

Sunnyvale has a public library, located on Tower Place in the northwestern portion of the city.

All of Dallas County (Sunnyvale included) is in the service area of Dallas College (formerly Dallas County Community College).

== Parks and recreation ==
Sunnyvale is along Lake Ray Hubbard, which has recreational activities for Sunnyvale residents.

There are also four parks in the city: Jobson Park, Town Center Park, Samuell Farm North, and Robert Vineyard Park.
