= Sunnyvale Independent School District =

School district in Texas

The Sunnyvale Independent School District is the school district in Sunnyvale, Texas, United States. The superintendent is Matt Kimball. The district is fairly small and has about 1,200 students.

== History ==
The district was established on February 26, 1953 after the mergers of the schools of Hattersville, Long Creek, New Hope, and Tripp.

Prior to fall 2007, Sunnyvale did not operate a high school; Sunnyvale's students were zoned to Mesquite ISD, attending North Mesquite High School.

Although the entire district was located in one building, construction began on a new high school for students in grades 5-8. Construction had been completed for the 2006–2007 school year.

The residents of SISD approved a bond to build a high school. Sunnyvale High School was housed at the middle school campus prior to its campus's opening in the fall of 2009. As of August 24, 2009, the Sunnyvale High School opened its doors to students.

In 2009, the school district was rated "exemplary" by the Texas Education Agency.

In 2011, the Sunnyvale ISD approved a $16.8 million bond election for the construction of a new elementary school to replace the current 50-year-old one. The bond election raised taxes on evaluations 7¢ per $100. The bond was approved by voters and the school was completed in time for the 2012–2013 school year.

== Schools ==
- Sunnyvale High School
- Sunnyvale Middle School
- Sunnyvale Intermediate school
- Sunnyvale Elementary School

== Demographics ==
In 1997 96.1% of the students were non-Hispanic white. By 2016 the percentage declined to a point slightly above 50%, although the actual number of non-Hispanic white students had increased, contrasting with the white flight seen in other Dallas County school districts. In 2016 13.3% of the students were classified as economically disadvantaged, an increase from past figures.

== See also ==
- List of school districts in Texas
