= Tripp, Sunnyvale, Texas =

Former town in Dallas County, Texas

Coordinates: 32°47′41″N 96°33′38″W

Tripp is a former town on the eastern side of Dallas County, Texas, United States.

After 1964, the town was annexed into Sunnyvale.
