= President George Bush Turnpike =

Toll road that runs around Dallas, Texas, USA

Pres. George Bush Turnpike

Route information
- Maintained by NTTA (main lanes) and TxDOT (frontage roads)
- Length: 54.9 mi (88.4 km)
- Existed: 1998–present
- Component highways: SH 161 Toll from Irving to Grand Prairie

Major junctions
- Counterclockwise end: I-20 in Grand Prairie
- I-30 in Grand Prairie; SH 183 in Irving; SH 114 in Irving; I-635 in Irving; I-35E / US 77 in Carrollton; Dallas North Tollway in Dallas; US 75 in Richardson; SH 78 in Garland; SH 66 in Rowlett
- Clockwise end: I-30 / US 67 in Garland

Location
- Country: United States
- State: Texas

Highway system
- Highways in Texas; Interstate; US; State; Former; Toll; Loops; Spurs; FM/RM; Park; Rec
← SH 160	SH 161	→ SH 162
← US 190	SH 190	→ SH 191

The President George Bush Turnpike (PGBT) is a 52-mile (84 km) controlled-access toll road running through the northern, northeastern and western suburbs, forming a partial beltway around Dallas, Texas, United States. It is named for George H. W. Bush, the 41st president of the United States. At its west end near Belt Line Road in Irving, State Highway 161 (SH 161) continues southwest to I-20 in Grand Prairie. The discontinuous free frontage roads along the turnpike from I-35E in Carrollton east to its end at I-30 in Garland are assigned the State Highway 190 (SH 190) designation. SH 190 signage appears only along the Rowlett, Garland, Richardson, Plano, and Carrollton sections of the frontage road with the undersign "frontage road only". At intersections with city streets, only the Bush Turnpike signs are displayed, not the SH 190 signage. Prior to the construction of the main lanes as a tollway, SH 190 was used as the name of the planned main lanes too. Similarly, the part west of I-35E was planned as part of SH 161. Bush Turnpike is signed as a north–south road from I-20 to I-35E (the "Western Extension"), an east–west road from I-35E to the Merritt Main Lane Gantry (the original sections) and as a north–south road from the Merritt Main Lane Gantry to I-30 (the "Eastern Extension"), as Bush Turnpike makes a nearly 90-degree curve in both places.

The turnpike is operated by the North Texas Tollway Authority. Currently, all maintenance is done under a five-year total routine maintenance contract with Roy Jorgensen Associates, Inc. based in Buckeystown, Maryland, that started in November 2011.

The turnpike passes through three Texas counties (Dallas, Collin and Denton) and nine Dallas suburbs (Rowlett, Sachse, Garland, Richardson, Plano, Carrollton, Farmers Branch, Irving, and Grand Prairie).

Originally the President George Bush Turnpike was equipped with traditional toll plazas for cash payment as well as RFID-based TollTag express lanes. However, on July 1, 2009, the cash plazas were closed and replaced with "ZipCash", an OCR-based camera system which reads the license plate and bills the owner by mail. This made the turnpike the first in the United States to transition to all-electronic toll collection. The ZipCash rates, however, come at a premium being significantly higher than both the TollTag rate and the earlier cash prices.

== History ==
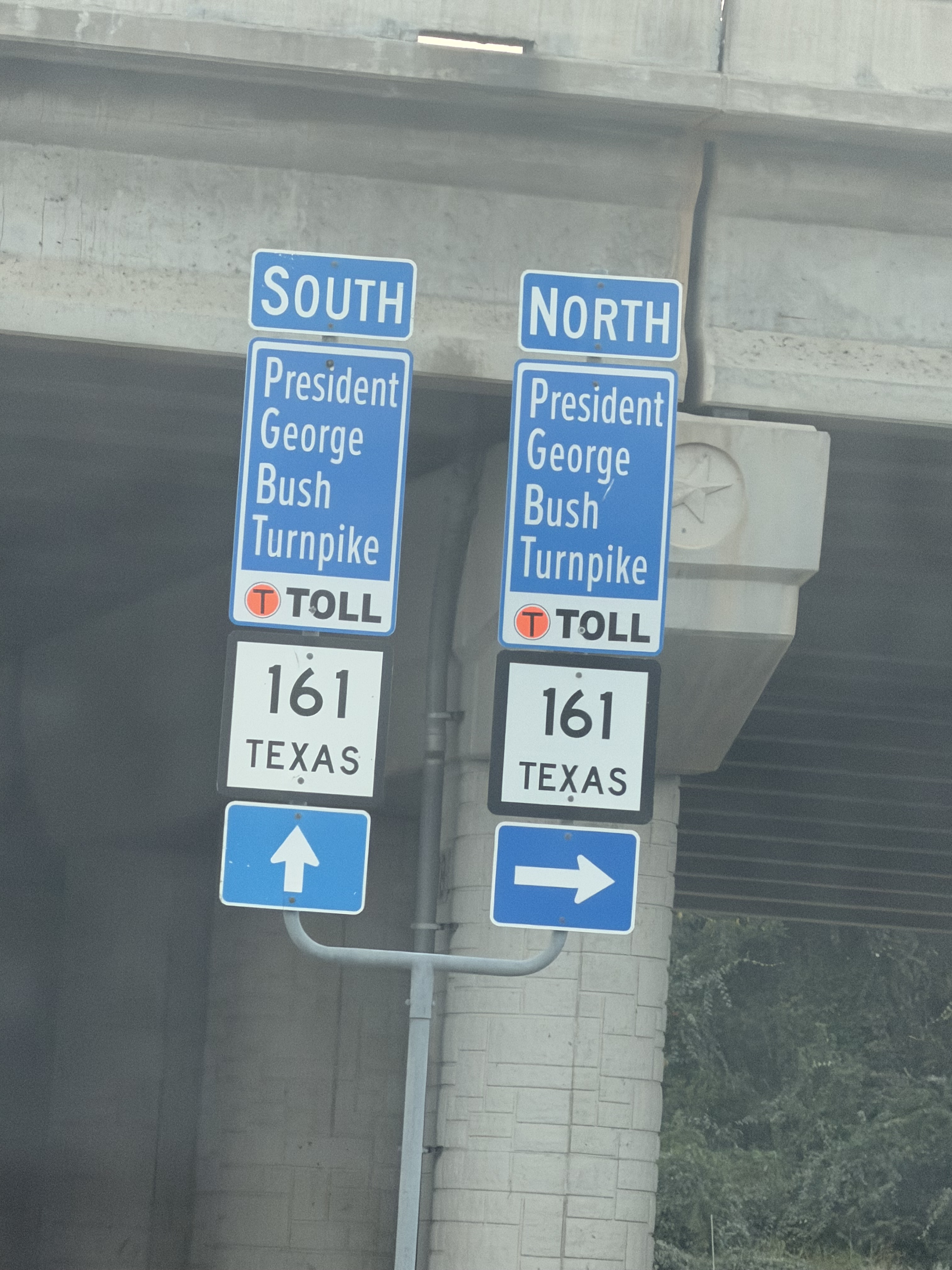
Frontage road signage showing both a PGBT and TX 161 shields underneath the bridge on Trinity Blvd

The corridor of SH 161 and the Turnpike was first proposed as an outer loop within Dallas County in 1957. The 1964 plan was the first to designate it as a freeway, and in 1969 the full loop was added to the state highway system as Loop 9. The loop would begin at Interstate 20 just east of the Tarrant County line and head north (along a corridor still planned as an extension of SH 161). From State Highway 183 it would run roughly along present SH 161, turning north on Belt Line Road and east just south of the Denton County line, crossing I-35E near the present junction. Rather than cross into Denton and Tarrant Counties, the loop would stay in Dallas County, running roughly where Campbell Road is now. It would rejoin the present Turnpike alignment and head southeast to Interstate 30 west of Lake Ray Hubbard. The south part of the loop would continue in a roughly circular route to end at the junction of I-20 and Spur 408, several miles east of the beginning of the loop. The short Spur 484, designated in 1970, would run from Loop 9 at Belt Line Road northeast along the present Turnpike alignment to I-635.

Some of the opposition to the loop came from Richardson, which was already divided by the Central Expressway. In conjunction with Plano, the city acquired empty right-of-way about two miles (3 km) to the north, where the Turnpike now runs, and set the centerline of the right-of-way to the border between Richardson and Plano.

Loop 9 was cancelled on October 1, 1977, and the western and northern section was split between two new designations: State Highway 161 from Interstate 20 to State Highway 114 (at Belt Line Road) and State Highway 190 from I-35E to SH 78. (The piece between SH 114 and IH 35E was removed from the state highway system.) Spur 484 was absorbed into SH 161 on October 31, 1979, making its northern terminus I-635 (at Valley View Lane). The connection between I-635 and I-35E was added to SH 161 on August 30, 1988.

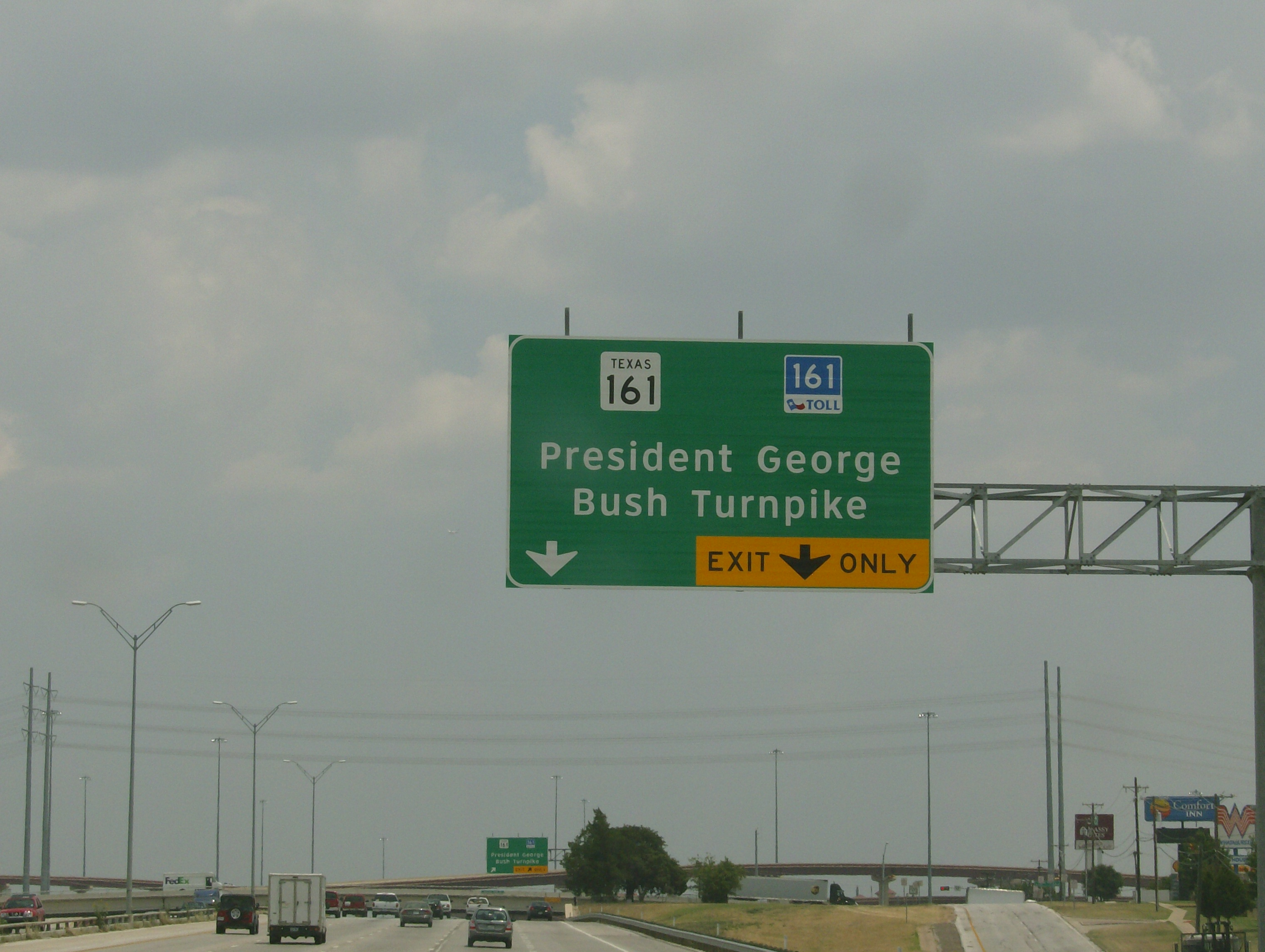
A turnoff to the George Bush Turnpike in Irving, Texas from SH 183

Construction on service roads began in late 1988 in north Garland and Richardson. A stack interchange was constructed in 1990 at U.S. Highway 75 in Richardson, which quickly became a white elephant as the structure remained abandoned for several years. On January 29, 1991, SH 190 was extended to I-20. In 1995 following a revision in federal laws, authorities agreed to shift to a toll financing scheme, providing an infusion of cash and new construction. The SH 190 designation was removed from the plans for the not-yet-constructed main lanes on October 26, 1995, and SH 190 was truncated to SH 78. and on April 30, 1998, SH 161 was removed from the piece between Belt Line Road and I-635 (Segment V). On April 26, 2007, SH 190 extended to I-30.

SH 161 was also the name of a route designated on March 19, 1930, from Clairemont southeastward to SH 70 near Rotan as a renumbering of SH 84A. That route was transferred to SH 70 on December 1, 1930, but was not cancelled until January 22, 1931.

SH 190 was also the name of a route designated on November 30, 1932, from Cuero southwestward to SH 119. That route was transferred to SH 29 on March 13, 1934.

At Dallas North Tollway, the interchange had been built in 1994 ready for the turnpike to be built in 1998.

In late December 2015, the President George Bush Turnpike and the I-30 interchange was directly hit by a large, EF4 tornado with winds of up to 180 mph while at peak strength at around 6:52pm CDT. The tornado lofted several cars driving on the interchange bridges and threw them several hundred yards, with some of the cars being found in Lake Ray Hubbard in the following weeks. Multiple cars were mangled beyond recognition and several fatalities occurred on the interchange.

== Description ==
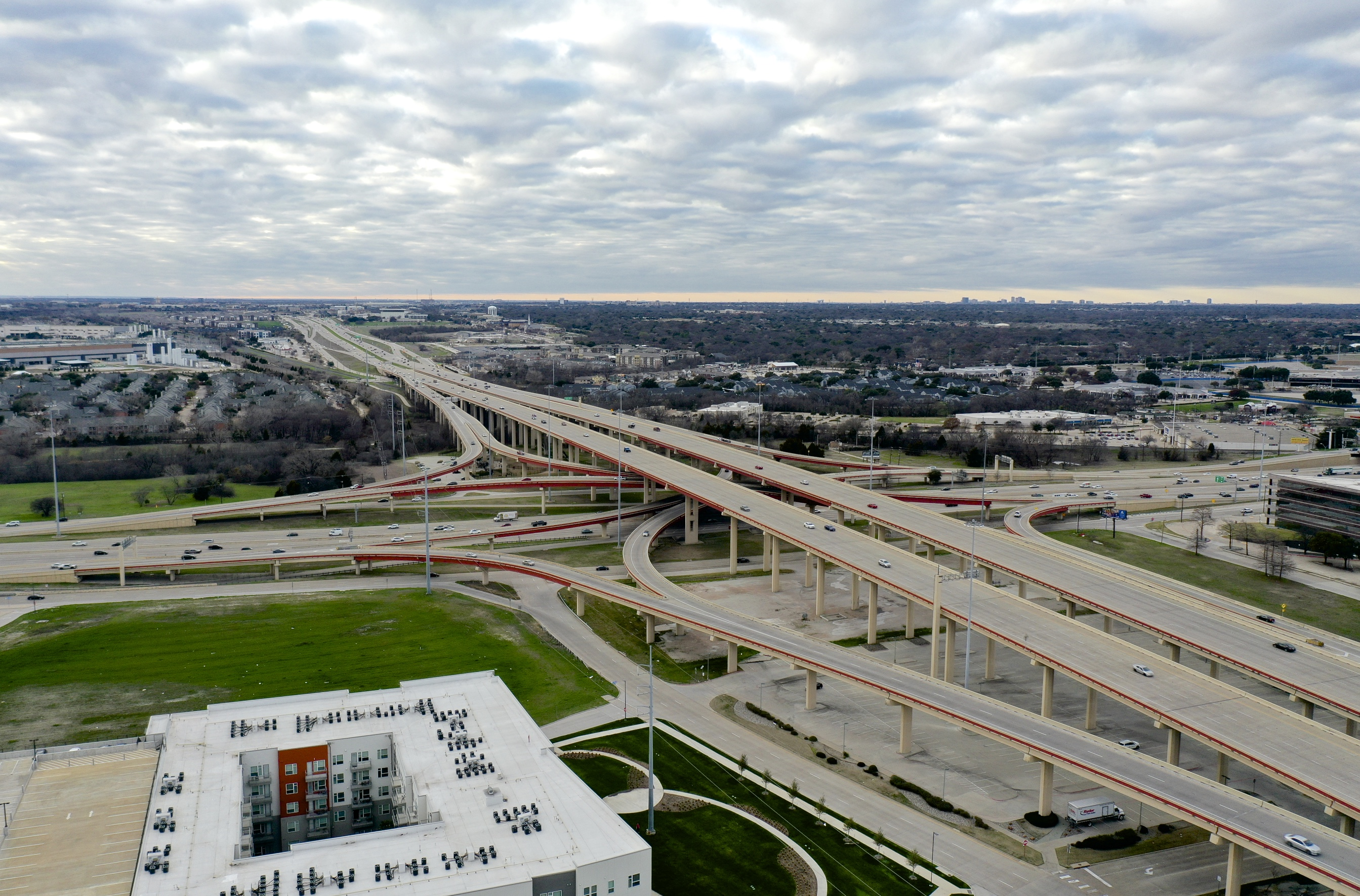
The stack interchange between PGBT (upper level, top to bottom) and Central Expressway (lower level, left to right).

Since the initial construction began in 1988, the turnpike was completed in a number of phases, as described here:

Segment I (North Dallas). Extends from Campbell Road to Midway Road, and includes the Dallas North Tollway and US 75 (Central Expressway) interchanges. Opened in December 1998 (Midway Road to Preston Road) and December 1999 (Preston Road to Campbell Road).

Segment II (Garland/Richardson). Extends from Campbell Road to SH 78. Opened in 2000.

Segment III (Carrollton). Extends from Midway Road in North Dallas to I-35E. Opened July 2001.

Segment IV ("President George Bush Turnpike Superconnector"). Connects I-35E to the I-635 airport extension. It covers 5.2 miles (8.4 km) and was built at the cost of $339 million. Much of the expense is because the segment is built within the Trinity River wetland and comprises many miles of bridges. Construction began in January 2003 and was completed in October 2005.

Segment V (Irving). A 3.9-mile (6.3 km) segment connecting the I-635 airport extension to the SH 161 freeway near Belt Line Road. It opened in December 2001. Unstable clay soil was a significant problem in this segment, requiring contractors to use concentrated liquid stabilizers and geosynthetic reinforcement. A part of President George Bush Turnpike was extended from SH 183 to Conflans Road in 2006.

Segment VI ("Western Extension", Irving/Grand Prairie). A 11.5-mile (18.5 km) extension south from SH 183 in Irving to I-30 in Grand Prairie. A portion of the Western Extension, from SH-183 to I-30 in Grand Prairie, opened in August 2009. The remaining 6.5-mile (10.5 km) of the Western Extension, from I-30 to I-20 in Grand Prairie, opened in October 2012.

Segment VII ("Eastern Extension", Garland/Sachse/Rowlett). A 9.9-mile (15.9 km) extension from SH 78 in Garland, through Rowlett and Sachse, and back into Garland at I-30. The project, with a price tag of $1.04 billion, included construction of a 1-mile bridge at Lake Ray Hubbard. Construction began in October 2008, and the Eastern Extension opened to traffic on December 21, 2011.

Segment VIII ("East Branch", Garland/Mesquite). A proposed extension from I-30 in Garland to I-20 in Mesquite, with an estimated cost of $730 million. In December 2015 an Environmental Impact Statement for the East Branch had been prepared but the review process was restarted in 2017. Construction is not expected until 2026. However as of August 2026, the project remains uncertain.

== Expansion plans ==
The next PGBT segment, the East Branch extension, is planned to begin at the PGBT Lake Ray Hubbard Interchange at I-30, extending south-southeast to near Duck Creek Way, then southward near Mesquite Metro Airport, terminating at I-20 near Rory Galloway Day Camp. The project is well into the planning stages, and an Environmental Impact Statement was under preparation as of December 2015. In May 2017 at a Dallas city council meeting it was stated TxDOT had restarted the environmental impact statement review process. As of August 2024, the schematic design was not expected to be finalized until at least the summer of 2026, right-of-way and final design was expected to take another three to four years, and construction was expected to take four to seven years.

In the longer term, the North Central Texas Council of Governments is studying a very broad outer loop around the entire Dallas–Fort Worth metroplex. Assuming it receives environmental clearance, funding, and political support, much of it would be completed in the 2020s or 2030s. The President George Bush Turnpike is not part of this outer loop, but the PGBT East Branch alignment was closely coordinated with the loop's master plan. The segment of the proposed outer loop through southern Dallas County would be known as Loop 9 and would likely be the first segment to be built.

== Exit list ==
All exits are unnumbered.

County	Location	mi	km	Destinations	Notes
Dallas	Grand Prairie	0.0	0.0	I-20 – Fort Worth, Dallas	Exit 455A (I-20)
Dallas	Grand Prairie	0.8	1.3	Mayfield Road, Warrior Trail, Forum Drive / Lake Ridge Parkway	Tolled northbound exit and southbound entrance
Dallas	Grand Prairie	1.6	2.6	Spur 303 (Pioneer Parkway) / Arkansas Lane / Warrior Trial	Tolled interchange
Dallas	Grand Prairie	1.9	3.1	Arkansas Mainlane Gantry	
Dallas	Grand Prairie	2.9	4.7	Marshall Drive, Dickey Road / SW 14th Street	Tolled southbound exit and northbound entrance
Dallas	Grand Prairie	4.3	6.9	SH 180 (Main Street) / Jefferson Street, January Lane/Hill Street	SH 180 is former US 80; tolled southbound exit and northbound entrance
Dallas	Grand Prairie	5.6	9.0	Tarrant Road, Egyptian Way	No direct southbound exit (signed at Lower Tarrant Road)
Dallas	Grand Prairie	5.7	9.2	I-30 – Dallas, Fort Worth	Exit 32 (I-30)
Dallas	Grand Prairie	6.9	11.1	Lower Tarrant Mainlane Gantry	
Dallas	Grand Prairie			Lower Tarrant Road, Carrier Parkway, Egyptian Way	Tolled interchange
Dallas	Grand Prairie	7.9	12.7	Oakdale Road	No direct southbound exit
Dallas	Grand Prairie	8.8	14.2	Trinity Boulevard, Shady Grove Road, Rock Island Road, Oakdale Road	Tolled southbound exit and northbound entrance
Dallas	Irving	9.0	14.5	Conflans Road	Tolled southbound exit and northbound entrance; to West Irving Station
Dallas	Irving	11.4	18.3	SH 183 – Ft Worth, DFW Airport, Dallas	South end of the overlap with SH 161
Dallas	Irving	12.3	19.8	Rochelle Road	Southbound exit only
Dallas	Irving	12.9	20.8	Northgate Drive	
Dallas	Irving	13.7	22.0	Walnut Hill Lane	
Dallas	Irving	14.7	23.7	Belt Line Road, Gateway Drive	North end of the overlap with SH 161; access to Belt Line Road Station
Dallas	Irving	15.2	24.5	Belt Line Main Lane Gantry	
Dallas	Irving	16.5	26.6	SH 114 / Royal Lane, Gateway Drive – DFW Airport North Entry	Tolled southbound exit and northbound entrance
Dallas	Irving	16.6	26.7	MacArthur Boulevard, Las Colinas Boulevard	No direct southbound exit (signed at Las Colinas Boulevard)
Dallas	Irving	18.1	29.1	I-635 west / Las Colinas Boulevard, Riverside Drive – DFW Airport North Entry	Exit 29 (I-635)
Dallas	Irving	18.5	29.8	I-635 east	No southbound exit; Exits 29-30 (I-635)
Dallas	Farmers Branch	19.3	31.1	Valley View Lane / Mercer Parkway	Tolled southbound exit and northbound entrance
Dallas	Carrollton	21.6	34.8	Luna Road / Belt Line Road	Tolled northbound exit and southbound entrance
Dallas	Carrollton	22.2	35.7	Sandy Lake Main Lane Gantry	
Dallas	Carrollton	22.9	36.9	Sandy Lake Road, Dickerson Parkway	
Dallas	Carrollton	23.9	38.5	I-35E – Denton, Dallas	Exit 445 (I-35E)
Dallas	Carrollton	25.1	40.4	Old Denton Road, McCoy Road / Dickerson Pkwy (SH 190 east)	
Dallas	Carrollton	26.2	42.2	Josey Lane, Scott Mill Road, McCoy Road	
Dallas	Carrollton	27.5	44.3	Kelly Boulevard / Trinity Mills Road	Eastbound exit and westbound entrance
Denton	Dallas	28.1	45.2	Frankford Main Lane Gantry	
Denton	Dallas	28.6	46.0	Frankford Road, Marsh Lane	
Denton–Collin county line	Dallas–Carrollton line	29.8	48.0	Rosemeade Parkway, Midway Road	
Collin	Dallas	30.8	49.6	Dallas North Tollway	
Collin	Dallas–Plano line	32.7	52.6	SH 289 (Preston Road)	To Baylor Regional Medical Center at Plano
Collin	Dallas–Plano line	34.0	54.7	Coit Main Lane Gantry	
Collin	Dallas–Plano line	34.6	55.7	Coit Road	To Medical Center of Plano
Collin	Richardson–Plano line	35.8	57.6	Independence Parkway (Plano) /Waterview Parkway (Richardson)	To UT Dallas
Collin	Richardson–Plano line	36.7	59.1	Custer Road (Plano)/Custer Parkway (Richardson)	Custer Parkway is displayed on the exit sign
Collin	Richardson–Plano line	37.6	60.5	Alma Drive (Plano)/Alma Road (Richardson)	Eastbound exit and westbound entrance, Alma Road is displayed on the exit sign
Collin	Richardson–Plano line	38.1	61.3	US 75 – McKinney, Dallas	Exit 28B (US 75)
Collin	Richardson–Plano line	38.6	62.1	Avenue K (Plano)/Plano Road (Richardson)	Formerly SH 5 north
Collin	Richardson–Plano line	39.6	63.7	Jupiter Road, Renner Road	
Collin	Richardson–Plano line	40.0	64.4	Renner Road, Jupiter Road	
Collin	Richardson	41.0	66.0	Shiloh Main Lane Gantry	
Collin–Dallas county line	Richardson–Garland line	40.5	65.2	Shiloh Road, Lookout Drive, Telecom Pkwy	No direct westbound exit (signed at Campbell Road)
Dallas	Garland	42.1	67.8	Campbell Road, Holford Road	
Dallas	Garland	43.2	69.5	North Garland Avenue, Holford Road, Brand Road	
Dallas	Garland	44.2	71.1	Brand Road	No direct eastbound exit (signed at North Garland Avenue)
Dallas	Garland	45.0	72.4	SH 78 / Crist Road – Wylie, Garland	No direct westbound exit (signed at Firewheel Parkway)
Dallas	Garland			Firewheel Parkway	
Dallas	Sachse	47.4	76.3	Miles Road, Merritt Road	
Dallas	Rowlett	48.6	78.2	Merritt Main Lane Gantry	
Dallas	Rowlett	49.6	79.8	Merritt/Liberty Grove Connector	
Dallas	Rowlett	51.4	82.7	SH 66 (Lakeview Parkway) / Main Street	To Lake Pointe Medical Center
Dallas	Rowlett	52.4	84.3	Miller Road	
Dallas	Lake Ray Hubbard	53.6– 54.3	86.3– 87.4	Bridge	
Dallas	Garland	54.5	87.7	I-30 / Frontage Road – Texarkana, Dallas	Exit 61B (I-30)
1.000 mi = 1.609 km; 1.000 km = 0.621 mi: Electronic toll collection; Incomplete access
