= Collin County Outer Loop =

Incomplete beltway in Collin County, Texas, USA

- Outer Loop Road
- Current Collin County Outer Loop highlighted in red

Route information
- Length: 18.3 mi (29.5 km)
- Existed: October 8, 2012–present

Major junctions
- West end: Dallas Parkway in Celina
- SH 289 in Celina; FM 2478 in Celina; FM 543 in Weston; US 75 in Anna; SH 5 in Anna
- East end: SH 121 near Melissa

Location
- Country: United States
- State: Texas

Highway system
- Highways in Texas; Interstate; US; State; Former; Toll; Loops; Spurs; FM/RM; Park; Rec

The Collin County Outer Loop is a partially-built beltway in Collin County, Texas. When completed, the 53-mile (85 km) highway would travel from the Denton County line to the Rockwall County line, passing through cities in the northern and eastern parts of the county. The Loop is part of the DFW Regional Outer Loop project, which would encircle the Dallas–Fort Worth metroplex.

As of November 2025, 18.3 miles (29.5 km) of the highway's frontage roads have been constructed. The constructed portion, consisting of Segment 1 and parts of Segment 3, runs from Dallas Parkway in Celina to Sam Rayburn Highway (SH 121) near Melissa. Segments 2, 4, and 5, as well as the rest of Segment 3, are in planning phases.

The highway was initially proposed as a toll road, with Collin County establishing the Collin County Toll Road Authority to manage the project. However, in March 2019 the county's Commissioners Court opted to make the road a freeway.

== Segments ==
For planning and construction purposes, the loop is divided into five segments. Construction of each segment will be performed in three phases: one frontage road, the second frontage road, and finally the highway's main lanes. As of 2026, only the first phase of Segment 1 and parts of Segment 3 have been constructed.

=== Segment 1 ===
Segment 1 runs 4.6 miles (7.4 km) east-west from US 75 in Anna to Sam Rayburn Highway (SH 121) northeast of Melissa. The segment's northern frontage road was built at a cost of $21 million and opened to traffic in 2012.

=== Segment 2 ===
Segment 2 will run north-south from FM 6 between Nevada and Josephine to the Rockwall County line near Royse City. This segment could possibly be extended further south past Interstate 30 through Rockwall, Kaufman and Dallas counties as part of a larger outer loop. The segment is currently being re-studied, with plans to release an environmental impact assessment in fall 2026.

=== Segment 3 ===
Segment 3 will run approximately 14.7 miles (23.7 km) east-west from the Denton County line in Celina to US 75 in Anna. This section could be extended further west through Denton County as part of a larger outer loop.

As of November 2025, 11.7 miles (18.8 km) of the segment have been completed, spanning from Dallas Parkway (a future extension of Dallas North Tollway) to US 75. Construction on the segment began in 2019, starting with the portion between Dallas Parkway and Preston Road (SH 289). This was extended to Custer Road (FM 2478) in October 2022, with a further extension to US 75 completed in November 2025, ahead of schedule. The remaining 3-mile (4.8 km) segment, dubbed Segment 3A, is scheduled for construction in 2026.

=== Segment 4 ===
Segment 4 will run north-south from US 380 near Farmersville to FM 6 between Nevada and Josephine. The segment is currently being re-studied, with plans to release an environmental impact assessment in fall 2026.

=== Segment 5 ===
Segment 5 will run through northeastern Collin County from Sam Rayburn Highway (SH 121) near Melissa to US 380 near Farmersville, connecting Segments 1 and 4. The county is currently determining an appropriate right of way for the segment.

== Junction list ==
The entire route is in Collin County.

Location	mi	km	Destinations	Notes
Celina			South Legacy Drive (near FM 428)	Denton/Collin county line
Celina	0.0	0.0	Dallas Parkway (future Dallas North Tollway)	Current western terminus
Celina			CR 52 (Celina Parkway)	
Celina	1.8	2.9	SH 289 (Preston Road) – Pottsboro, Frisco	
Celina			CR 88 (Choate Parkway)	
Celina			CR 87 (Coit Road)	
Celina	4.8	7.7	FM 2478 – Weston, McKinney	
			CR 126	
Weston			FM 543 (Weston Road) – Weston, McKinney	
			CR 280 (Chambersville Road)	
			CR 281 (Trinity Falls Parkway)	
Anna	0.0	0.0	US 75 (Central Expressway) – Sherman, McKinney	Segment 3/1 boundary US 75 exit 47B
Anna	1.7	2.7	SH 5 (South Powell Parkway / McKinney Street) – Sherman, McKinney	
Anna	4.6	7.4	SH 121 (Sam Rayburn Highway) – Bonham, McKinney	Current eastern terminus Segment 1/5 boundary
			CR 472 / CR 474	
			CR 475	
Anna			FM 2862 – Anna	
			CR 505 / CR 506	
			CR 577	
			SH 78 – Leonard, Blue Ridge	
			CR 630	
			CR 632	
			CR 971	
			CR 670	
			FM 981 – Leonard, Blue Ridge, Celeste	
			CR 668	
			CR 618	
			CR 663	
			FM 2194 – Merit, Farmersville	
			CR 656	
			CR 655 (Murchison Street)	
Farmersville			US 380 (Audie Murphy Parkway) – Greenville, McKinney	Segment 5/4 boundary
			FM 547 – Farmersville, Josephine	
			CR 649	
			CR 647 / CR 644	
			FM 1778 – Josephine, Copeville	
			CR 543 (Hubbard Road)	
Josephine			FM 6 – Caddo Mills, Lavon	Segment 4/2 boundary
			CR 637	
Royse City			CR 590 (Blackstock Road)	
Royse City			CR 588	
Royse City			County Line Road	Rockwall/Collin county line
1.000 mi = 1.609 km; 1.000 km = 0.621 mi: Unopened

== See also ==
- Texas State Highway Loop 9
