= Dallas North Tollway =

Highway in Texas

Dallas North Tollway

Route information
- Maintained by North Texas Tollway Authority
- Length: 30.2 mi (48.6 km)
- Existed: 1968–present

Major junctions
- South end: I-35E / US 77 in Dallas
- I-635 in Dallas Pres. George Bush Turnpike in Dallas; Sam Rayburn Tollway in Plano US 380 in Frisco
- North end: First Street in Prosper; FM 121 near Gunter (future)

Location
- Country: United States
- State: Texas

Highway system
- Highways in Texas; Interstate; US; State; Former; Toll; Loops; Spurs; FM/RM; Park; Rec

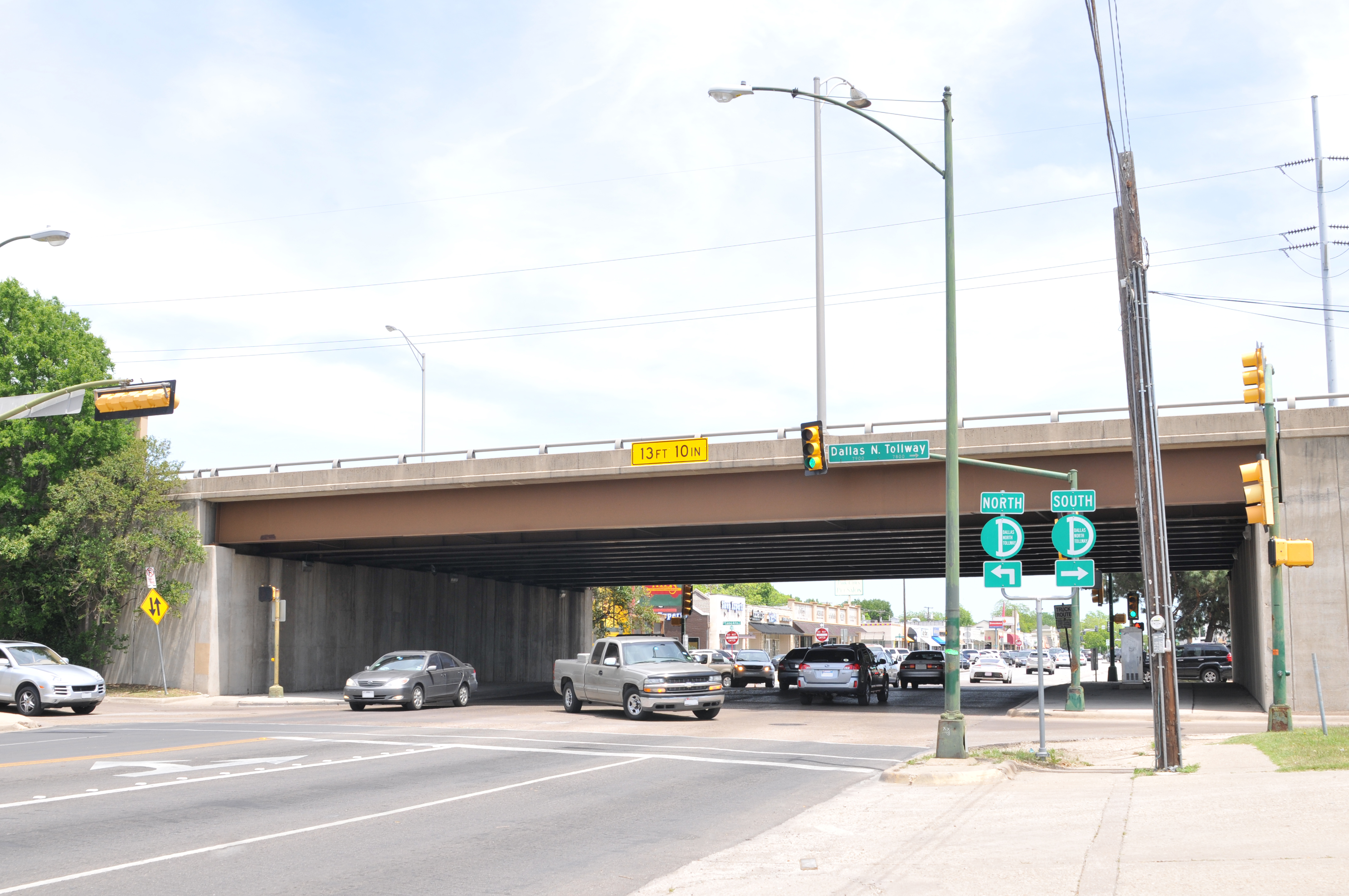
DNT at the Lovers Lane overpass

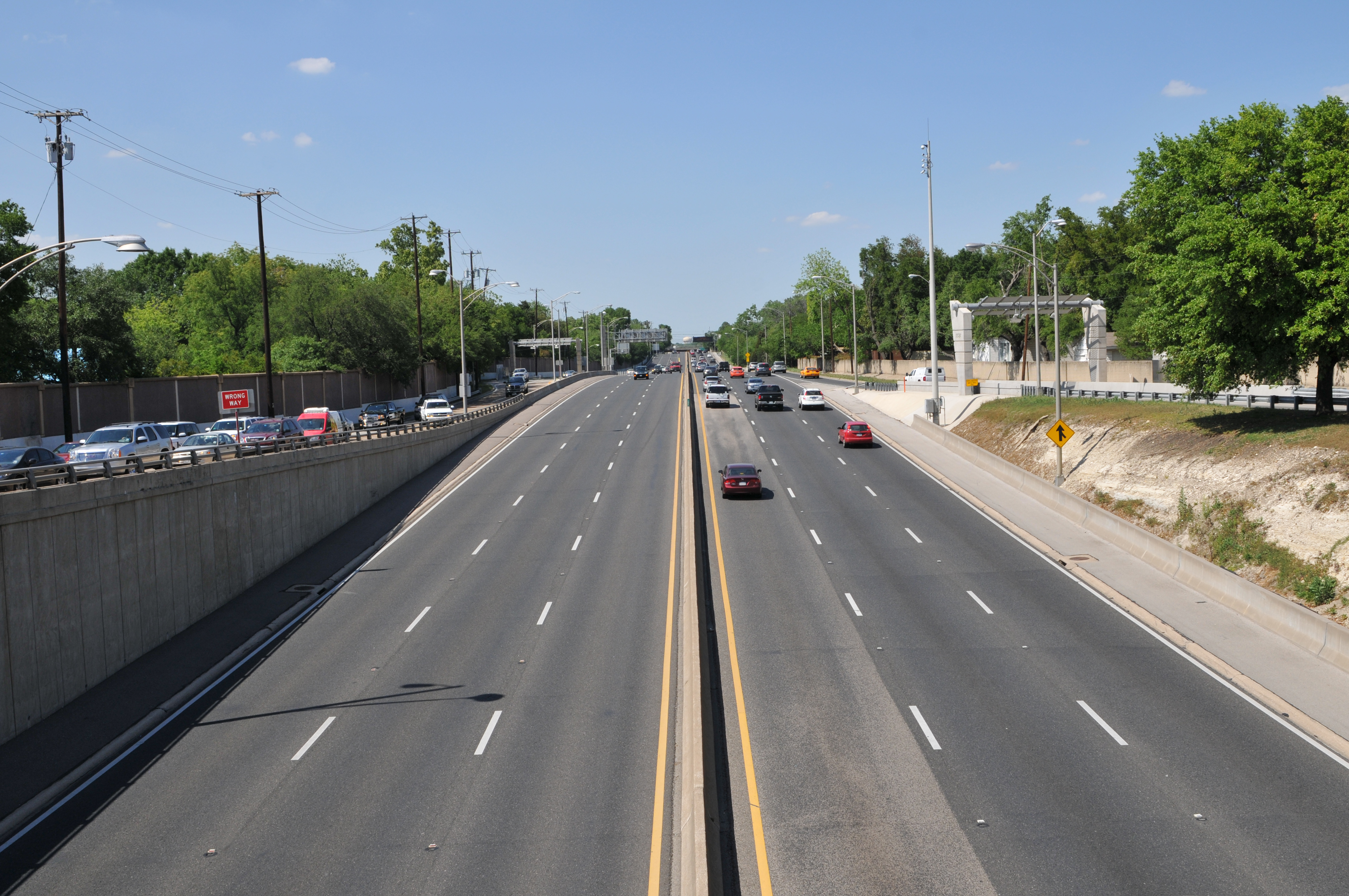
DNT just north of the Northwest Highway

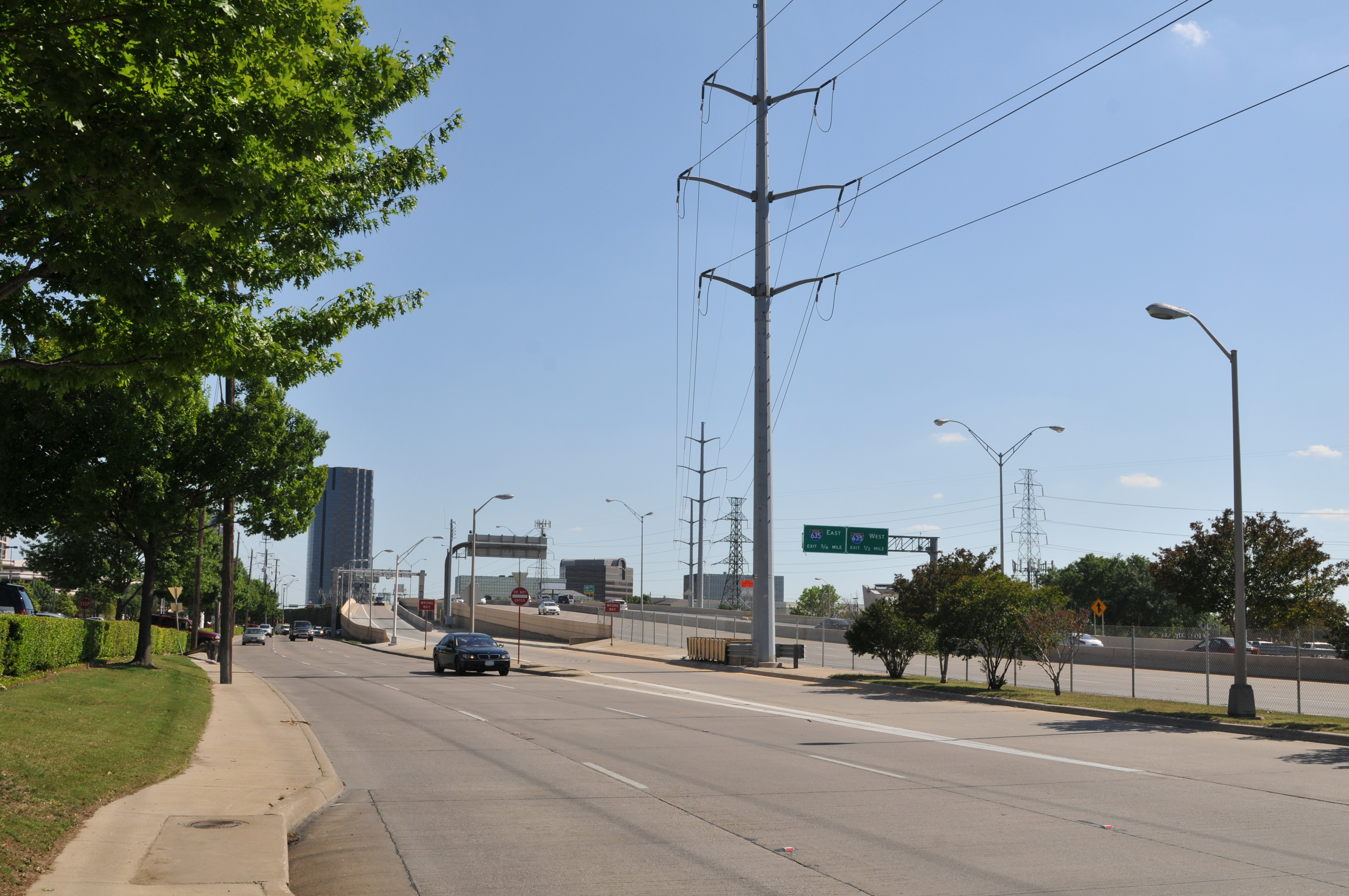
DNT at the Alpha Road interchange

The Dallas North Tollway (DNT, or simply the Tollway) is a 30.2-mile (49 km) controlled-access toll road operated by the North Texas Tollway Authority (NTTA), which runs from Interstate 35E near Downtown Dallas, Texas (USA), to First Street in Prosper, Texas, one mile north of U.S. Highway 380. On December 20, 2023, the NTTA announced the Tollway's next extension which runs 6 miles (9.7 km) through Prosper and Celina and ends at FM 428.

The Dallas North Tollway was the first toll road in the United States to implement electronic toll collection technology, with the introduction of the TollTag in 1989. TollTag users were originally charged $0.05 extra per transaction, but by 1999, the agency moved to the active encouragement of TollTag use by giving tag users a discount off the cash toll rate. In August 2007, the NTTA announced plans to phase out staffed toll booths entirely by May 2010. The Tollway was converted to all-electronic toll collection on December 11, 2010.

North of Interstate 635, the Dallas North Tollway is accompanied by frontage roads, which are designated as Dallas Parkway for address purposes. Historically, Dallas Parkway has demarcated future Tollway construction, and properties along the Tollway actually carry a Dallas Parkway address. Currently, Dallas Parkway extends to Gunter, about 4 miles (6.4 km) west of the Gunter central business district, and 51 miles (82 km) north of Downtown Dallas.

== History ==
The Texas Legislature created the Turnpike Act on June 9, 1953, thereby creating the Texas Turnpike Authority. The Texas Turnpike Authority began issuing bonds in 1955 for its second project, the first 30-mile section of the Dallas North Tollway. The original cost was $33,650,000 and started in 1966 and completed from Interstate 35E near downtown Dallas north to Royal Lane in 1968, and soon after to Interstate 635.

=== Toll controversy ===
J.H. "Jack" Davis, Engineer-Manager for the Texas Turnpike Authority, stated in 1968 that "When revenue bonds for a project are finally paid off, however, the facility reverts to the state as part of its highway system, to be used free." This was supposed to happen the same way the Texas Turnpike Authority turned over the Dallas–Fort Worth Turnpike to the Highway Department in 1977 to become I-30, which then became toll free. However, the Dallas North Tollway never became toll free and has never been turned over to the Highway Department. The North Texas Tollway Authority's web site states that "it was no longer a statewide practice to remove tolls from roadways due to a lack of state funding to maintain the roadways". While it may have been Jack Davis' unofficial intent, it was not law. The last bond payment was made January 1, 2005.

The Texas Legislature created the North Texas Tollway Authority in June 1997, replacing the Texas Turnpike Authority on September 1, 1997. The Regional Tollway Authority Act, Chapter 366 of the Texas Transportation Code, is what authorizes the North Texas Tollway Authority, thereby making it a political subdivision of the State of Texas and the operator of the North Dallas Tollway.

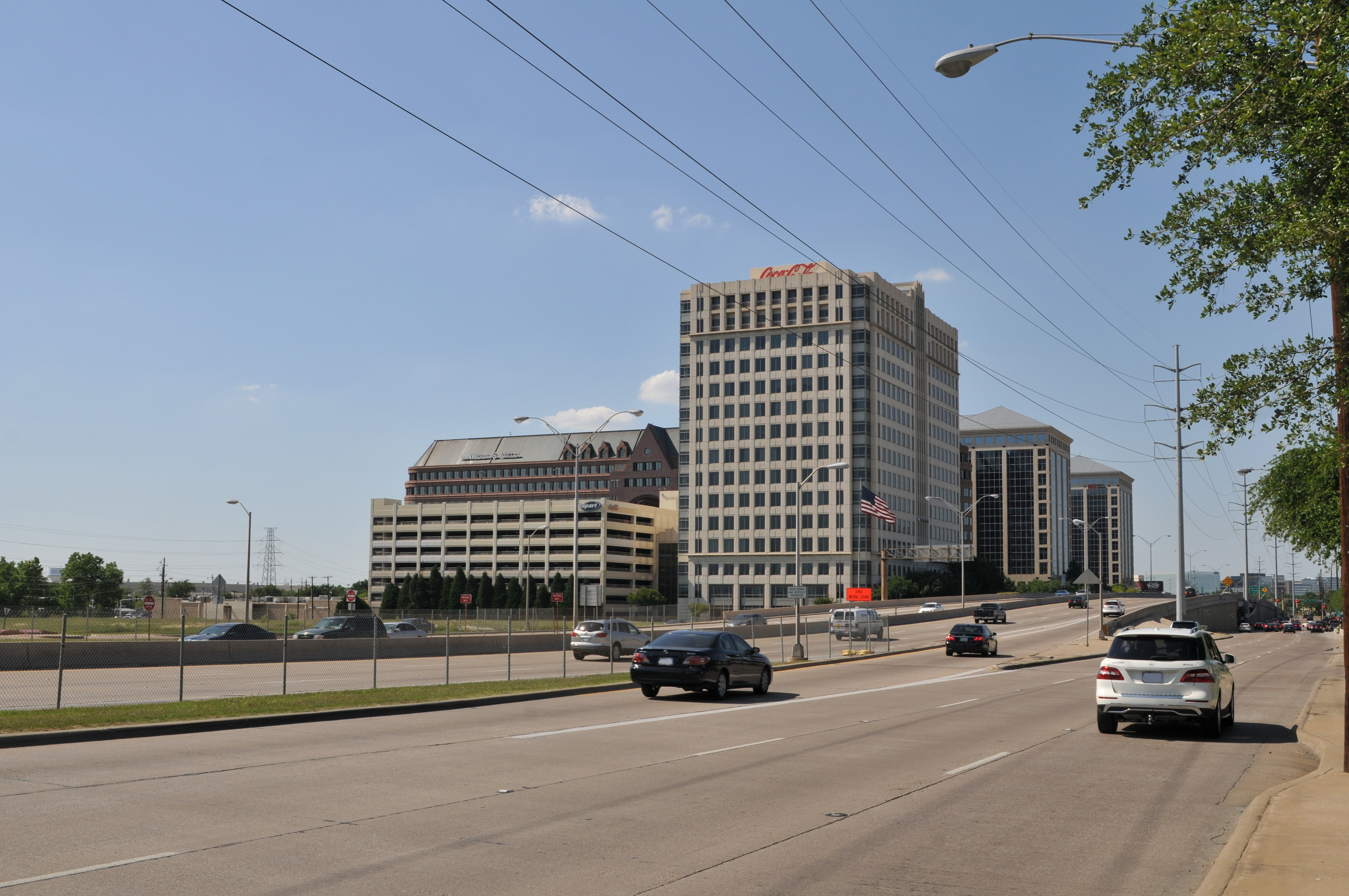
DNT at the Spring Valley Road interchange

The initial segment of the tollway ran from Interstate 35E to Royal Lane along an old St. Louis Southwestern Railway corridor. The right-of-way is generally 100 feet (30 m) along this segment, one of the narrowest controlled-access roads in Texas. The segment was completed in June 1968 and toll was originally 20 cents. The tollway was later extended to Briargrove Lane in 1987, to Headquarters Drive in 1994, to SH 121 and Gaylord Parkway in 2004, and to US 380 in 2007. The extensions generally parallel SH 289, also known as Preston Road. The "DNT Extension Phase 3," which runs from SH 121 to U.S. Highway 380, opened in mid-2007.

Current tolls vary from $0.40 to $2.15 for a car with it being more expensive closer to downtown; the lone exception is the Eldorado Pkwy. toll plaza in Frisco. The Tolltag offers a discount on these rates (tolls are $0.30 to $1.41) but requires a prepayment of $40 for up to three transponders, and after that, TollTag accounts can be reloaded at a minimum of $10. Rates increased in September 2009 and will increase every two years. All toll plazas are now equipped for electronic toll collection and main lane plazas feature TollTag express lanes.

== Route description ==
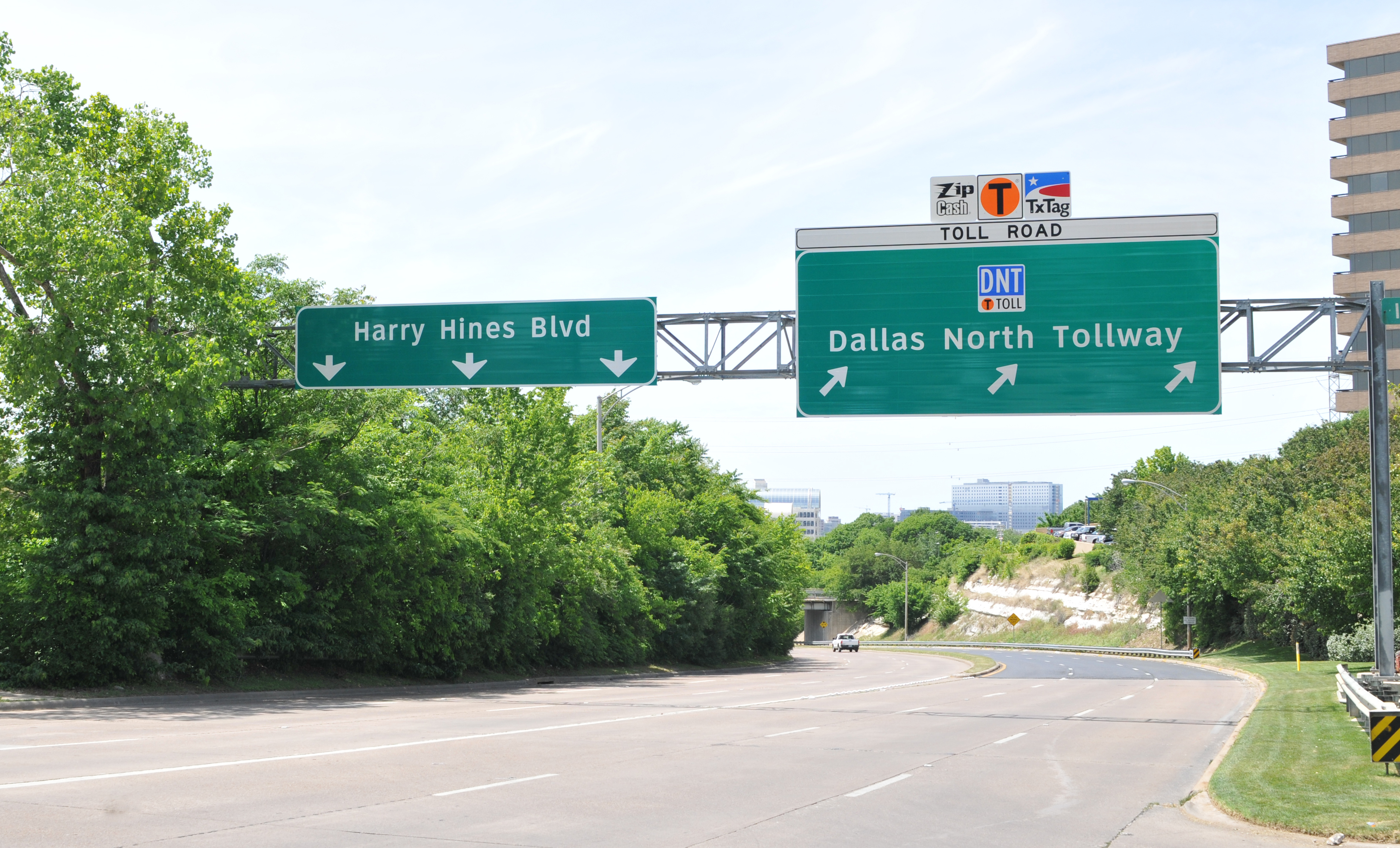
DNT at the Harry Hines Boulevard interchange

The Dallas North Tollway begins at an interchange with I-35E and Harry Hines Boulevard in the Victory Park and Market Center areas of Dallas. Southbound traffic from the Tollway going onto I-35E must first get on the access road before entering onto the main freeway. The Tollway's first toll plaza is located at Wycliff Avenue in Oak Lawn. Nearby, the Tollway's first northbound exit is at Lemmon Avenue, just before it enters Highland Park. The city streets of Eastern Avenue and Roland Avenue run alongside the Tollway on the southbound and northbound sides respectively. Due to passing through a previously developed heavily populated area at the time of construction, high noise cancelling walls line the Tollway with numerous signs warning drivers about limited sight distance. At the Mockingbird Lane interchange, the Dallas North Tollway briefly enters into University Park before returning to Dallas. Between Loop 12 and Northaven Road, the Tollway runs about a 1/4 mile west of SH 289 (Preston Road).

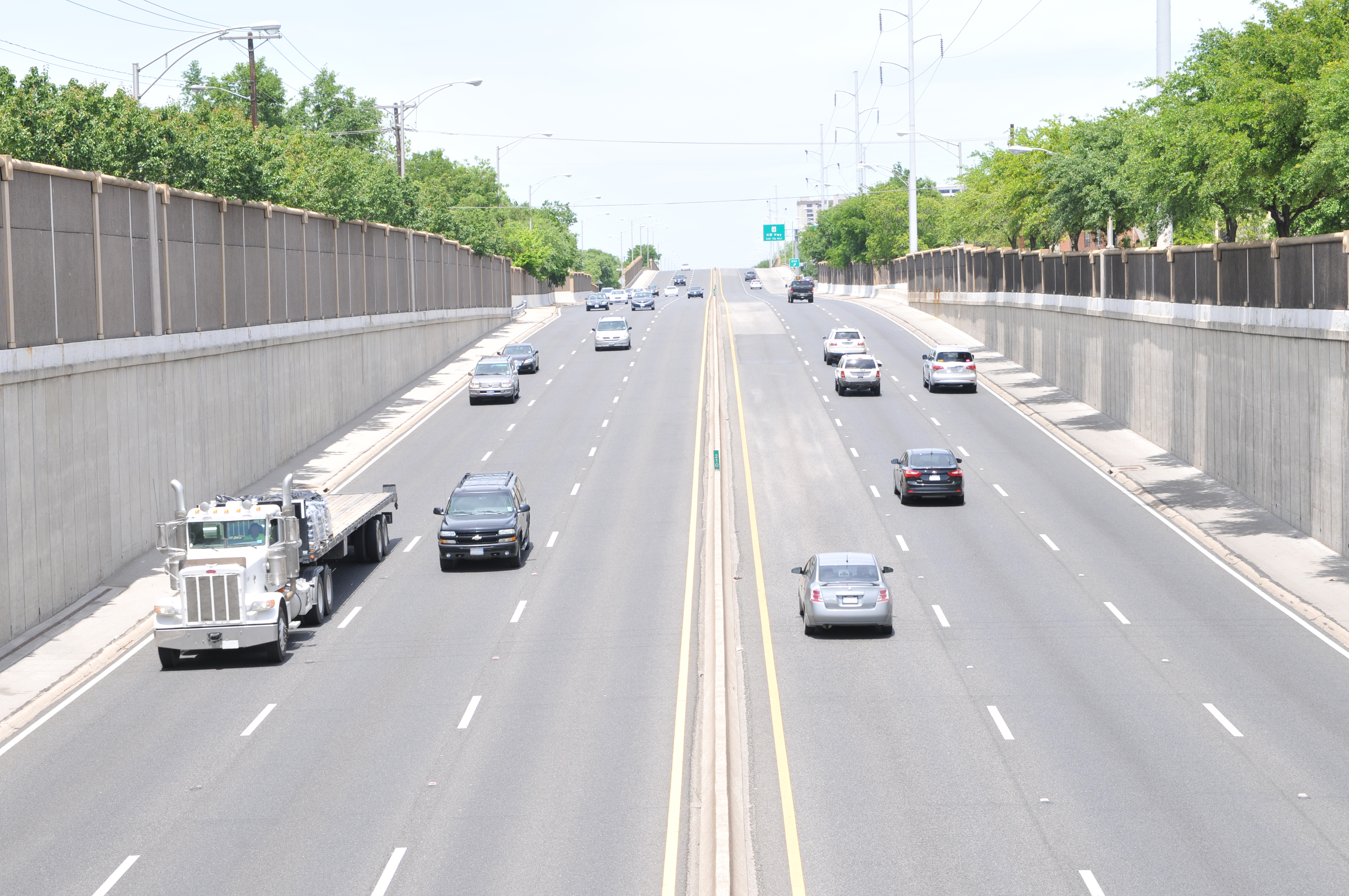
DNT facing north from the University Boulevard overpass

The Tollway connects with I-635 (LBJ Freeway) near the Galleria Dallas and runs along the eastern edge of Farmers Branch and enters into Addison. At the Dallas-Collin county line, the Tollway connects with the President George Bush Turnpike and enters the city of Plano. North of I-635, The Tollway is adjacent to many shopping centers and housing developments. The northern Plano corporate headquarters of Pizza Hut are also adjacent to the Tollway. It connects with SH 121/Sam Rayburn Tollway and enters into Frisco, passing by the Riders Field and Toyota Stadium. As of early 2024, the segment between the ballpark and Main Street Frisco is relatively undeveloped, as are the rural areas north of Frisco. The Dallas North Tollway currently ends at First Street in Prosper, Texas, one mile north of US 380, with Dallas Parkway continuing north as a county road.

== Capacity projects and extensions ==
At the Tollway's southern end, near downtown, the agency has rebuilt the road around the main toll plaza and added ramps at Oak Lawn Avenue. This project, started in 2006, ended in late fall 2008. On the southern sector of the tollway, the agency plans to spend about US$43 million to add an entrance and exit at Oak Lawn and rebuild most of the tollway surface from the I-35E ramps to Lemmon Avenue. The tollway authority has completely rebuilt the aging toll plaza, adding a third TollTag express lane in each direction. This work coincides with major projects by the city of Dallas to rebuild part of Oak Lawn under the tollway, and by Dallas Area Rapid Transit (DART) to build a rail line along nearby Harry Hines Boulevard.

The North Texas Tollway Authority started work in January 2006 at seven North Dallas locations to improve ramps and add merging lanes. The project cost US$14 million. Northbound projects included adding acceleration or auxiliary lanes between Keller Springs and Trinity Mills roads and between Alpha and Spring Valley roads. Southbound projects include adding outside lane pavement at the President George Bush Turnpike exit; between the Bush Turnpike entrance ramp and Frankford Road; between the Frankford entrance ramp and Sojourn Drive; around the Keller Springs exit at the main lane toll plaza; and between the Keller Springs toll plaza and Spring Valley. The projects would noticeably lengthen many shorter merging lanes, including one at Trinity Mills where vehicles must merge quickly after driving around a curve.

On December 20, 2023, the NTTA announced the Tollway's latest extension. This six lane extension runs 6 miles (9.7 km) through Prosper and Celina, ends at FM 428, and is expected to cost $460 Million. The Tollway segment between the Sam Rayburn Tollway and US 380 will also be widened during this time, with both projects scheduled to be completed by the end of 2027.

It is expected that future extensions will follow the Dallas Parkway alignment. As of early 2024 the Parkway reaches Gunter's West Main Street, four miles west of the Gunter central business district. So far, all extensions are following the general outline of the 2011 Grayson County Tollway study. This study projects an alignment north to US 82 that then veers northeast to the Tollway's end, a connection with US 75 in North Denison.

== Exit list ==
Due to the continuous frontage road system north of I-635, those exits serve more than one roadway. This table lists the combined destinations as they would be viewed when traveling in the northbound direction, though southbound exits will occasionally be grouped in a different way. NTTA does not provide mile reference markers or exit numbers. However, reference markers are provided at 500-foot (150 m) intervals along the major corridors. These markers are installed on the top of the concrete traffic barrier along the DNT corridor. The reference marker corresponds to the station of the alignment in the construction plans. All exits are unnumbered.

County	Location	mi	km	Destinations	Notes
Dallas	Dallas	0.0	0.0	I-35E south / Harry Hines Boulevard south – Downtown Dallas	Exit 429D on I-35E (Stemmons Freeway)
Dallas	Dallas	0.2	0.32	Oak Lawn Avenue	Southbound exit and northbound entrance; to Parkland Hospital and UT Southwestern Medical Center
Dallas	Dallas	0.8	1.3	Wycliff Avenue	Southbound exit and northbound entrance
Dallas	Dallas	0.9	1.4	Wycliff Main Lane Gantry	
Dallas	Dallas	1.2	1.9	Lemmon Avenue	Northbound exit and southbound entrance
Dallas	Highland Park	2.4	3.9	Mockingbird Lane	Tolled southbound exit and northbound entrance
Dallas	University Park	3.3	5.3	Lovers Lane	Northbound exit and southbound entrance
Dallas	Dallas	4.4	7.1	Loop 12 (Northwest Highway)	Tolled southbound exit and northbound entrance
Dallas	Dallas	5.2	8.4	Walnut Hill Lane	Northbound exit and southbound entrance
Dallas	Dallas	6.5	10.5	Royal Lane / Windhaven Road	Tolled southbound exit and northbound entrance
Dallas	Dallas	7.5	12.1	Forest Lane	Northbound exit and southbound entrance
Dallas	Dallas	8.2	13.2	Harvest Hill Road	Northbound exit and southbound entrance
Dallas	Dallas	8.7	14.0	I-635	Exits 22C-D on I-635 (Lyndon B. Johnson Freeway)
Dallas	Dallas	9.1	14.6	Alpha Road / Galleria Road – Galleria Dallas	
Dallas	Farmers Branch	10.0	16.1	Spring Valley Road / Verde Valley Lane / Quorum Drive	Tolled northbound exit and southbound entrance
Dallas	Addison	10.9	17.5	Belt Line Road / Arapaho Road / Quorum Drive / Verde Valley Lane	Tolled northbound exit and southbound entrance
Dallas	Addison	11.5	18.5	Keller Springs Road to Addison Airport Toll Tunnel / Arapaho Road / Westgrove Drive	Tolled northbound exit and southbound entrance
Dallas	Addison	13.0	20.9	Trinity Mills Main Line Gantry	
Collin	Dallas	13.4	21.6	Trinity Mills Road / Briargrove Lane	Northbound exit and southbound entrance
Collin	Dallas	14.2	22.9	Frankford Road / Haverwood Lane / Trinity Mills Road / Westgrove Drive	Tolled southbound exit and northbound entrance
Collin	Dallas	14.9	24.0	Pres. George Bush Turnpike	
Collin	Plano	15.2	24.5	Plano Parkway	Northbound exit and southbound entrance
Collin	Plano	16.2	26.1	Chapel Hill Road / Park Boulevard / Plano Parkway	Tolled northbound exit and southbound entrance
Collin	Plano	16.7	26.9	Parker Main Lane Gantry	
Collin	Plano	17.2	27.7	Parker Road / Chapel Hill Road	Tolled southbound exit and northbound entrance); to Plano Presbyterian Hospital
Collin	Plano	17.8	28.6	Windhaven Parkway	
Collin	Plano	18.8	30.3	Tennyson Parkway / Spring Creek Parkway	Tolled southbound exit and northbound entrance
Collin	Plano	19.5	31.4	Legacy Drive / Tennyson Parkway	Tolled southbound exit and northbound entrance
Collin	Plano	19.9	32.0	SH 121 / Headquarters Drive	Tolled northbound exit and southbound entrance
Collin	Plano	20.4	32.8	Sam Rayburn Tollway – Lewisville, McKinney	
Collin	Frisco	21.3	34.3	Gaylord Parkway / Warren Parkway	Tolled northbound exit and southbound entrance); to Baylor Medical Center
Collin	Frisco	22.7	36.5	John Hickman Parkway / Lebanon Road	Tolled northbound exit and southbound entrance
Collin	Frisco	23.3	37.5	Stonebrook Parkway	Tolled northbound exit and southbound entrance
Collin	Frisco	24.9	40.1	Cotton Gin Road / Main Street	Tolled northbound exit and southbound entrance
Collin	Frisco	25.9	41.7	Eldorado Main Lane Gantry	
Collin	Frisco	26.7	43.0	FM 2934 (Eldorado Parkway)	Tolled southbound exit and northbound entrance
Collin	Frisco	27.7	44.6	Panther Creek Parkway	
Collin	Frisco	29.7	47.8	Fields Parkway / Universal Parkway / PGA Parkway	Northbound exit and southbound entrance, future exit for Universal Kids Resort in 2026
Collin	Frisco	30.2	48.6	US 380 (Dallas Parkway) / CR 27 north – Denton, Greenville	
Collin	Prosper	31.2	50.2	CR 3 (First Street) / Lovers Parkway Dallas North Tollway ends	At-grade intersection, northbound exit and southbound entrance, future full interchange (Phase 4A)
Collin	Prosper	32.2	51.8	CR 4 (Prosper Trail)	At-grade intersection, future interchange (Phase 4A)
Collin	Prosper	33.2	53.4	CR 5 (Frontier Parkway)	At-grade intersection, future interchange (Phase 4A)
Collin	Celina	34.1	54.9	CR 51 (Light Farms Way)	At-grade intersection, future interchange (Phase 4A)
Collin	Celina	34.9	56.2	CR 7 (Punk Carter Parkway)	At-grade intersection, future interchange (Phase 4A)
Collin	Celina	35.3	56.8	CR 51 (Proposed Outer Loop Freeway)	At-grade intersection, future interchange (Phase 4A)
Collin	Celina	36.4	58.6	FM 428	Northern terminus of CR 27, roadway continues on as Dallas Parkway; at grade intersection, future interchange (Phase 4A)
Collin	Celina			CR 54	At-grade intersection, future interchange (Phase 4B)
Collin–Denton county line	Celina			CR 5 / CR 8 (Mobberly Road)	At-grade intersection, future interchange (Phase 4B)
Collin–Denton county line				CR 9	At-grade intersection, future interchange (Phase 4B)
Collin–Denton county line				O'Brien Road	Future interchange (Phase 4B)
Collin–Denton county line				FM 455	At-grade intersection, future interchange (Phase 4B)
Collin–Denton county line				Future Road 1	Future interchange (Phase 4B)
Collin–Denton county line				Future Road 2	Future interchange (Phase 4B)
Collin–Denton county line				Fritcher Road	At-grade intersection, future interchange (Phase 4B)
Collin–Denton county line				CR-60 / Blaine Road	At-grade intersection, future interchange (Phase 4B)
Grayson				Berend Road / Future Road 3	Future interchange (Phase 5A)
Grayson				Jaresh Road / Future Road 4	Future interchange (Phase 5A)
Grayson				Stiff Chapel Road / Future Road 5	Future interchange (Phase 5A)
Grayson				FM 121	Future interchange (Phase 5A)
1.000 mi = 1.609 km; 1.000 km = 0.621 mi: Electronic toll collection; Incomplete access; Unopened
