= Texas State Highway Loop 9 =

Proposed highway in Texas

State Highway Loop 9

Route information
- Maintained by TxDOT
- Length: 9.9 mi (15.9 km)
- Existed: 2017–present

Major junctions
- West end: I-35E in Red Oak
- East end: I-45 / I-45 BL near Ferris

Location
- Country: United States
- State: Texas
- Counties: Dallas, Ellis

Highway system
- Highways in Texas; Interstate; US; State; Former; Toll; Loops; Spurs; FM/RM; Park; Rec
← SH 9	→ FM 9

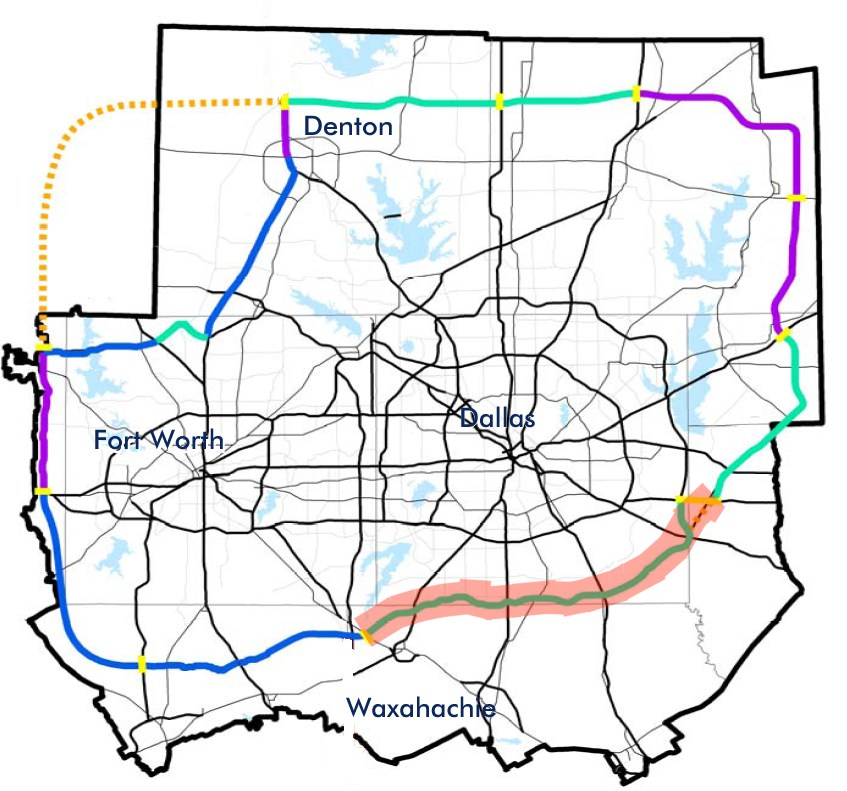
Tentative master plan for Dallas-Fort Worth outer loops, as released by the North Central Texas Council of Governments Metropolitan Transportation Program in 2009. Loop 9, as defined by TxDOT, is highlighted in red; it is unknown whether the remainder of the loop would receive this designation.

Loop 9 is a state highway under phased construction on the southern fringes of the Dallas/Fort Worth Metroplex. When fully completed, it will span approximately 30 miles (48 km), running along the southern Dallas County line and extending westward into northern Johnson County. Although often considered the southern counterpart to the President George Bush Turnpike (PGBT), Loop 9 is part of a broader initiative to develop an outer loop that will serve the expanding DFW population forecasted to number 10 million circa 2040.

The highway will be constructed in phases, beginning with the development of frontage roads, followed by the construction of the main highway when funding becomes available. Loop 9 is divided into three segments: Segment A extends from US 67 to I-35E along the Dallas and Ellis county border, Segment B runs from Interstate 35E to I-45 in southern Dallas County, and Segment C stretches from Interstate 45 to I-20, connecting with US 175 in Seagoville.

Currently, Segment B is open and is operating as a two-way roadway, though it will eventually serve as the eastbound frontage road for Loop 9. Additionally, the Interstate 35E frontage roads at Loop 9 will be realigned to accommodate a future stack interchange.

The corridor was first identified in 1968, with a preliminary study completed in 1995. A final decision on the route was initially projected for 2009 but remains undecided. The Draft Environmental Impact Statement (DEIS), originally expected to be completed in 2009, was also not finalized as of 2012, and TxDOT estimates for a 2015 opening have passed. The project has been impacted by a national recession, a construction slowdown, and a severe shortage of state highway funds, which has contributed to delays and uncertainty in its development timeline. Despite these setbacks, planning authorities expect Loop 9 to play a critical role in forming a large outer loop encircling the metroplex.

== History ==

The number was assigned to Spur 9 originally, which was designated from US 70 to Olton on September 26, 1939, as a renumbering of SH 28 Spur. On June 21, 1955, this became part of FM 304, which became part of FM 168 on October 31, 1958.

On May 6, 1969, Loop 9 was designated from I-20 north, east, south, west, and northwest back to I-20. On October 21, 1977, Loop 9 was cancelled and portions became SH 161 and SH 190 the same day. The Loop 9 designation was restored on June 29, 2017, to a highway from I-35E to I-45.

== Major intersections ==
County	Location	mi	km	Destinations	Notes
Dallas	Red Oak	0.0	0.0	I-35E north (US 77 north)	Current western terminus at I-35E northbound frontage road
Dallas	Lancaster	1.0	1.6	Houston School Road	Future interchange; current at-grade intersection
Dallas	Lancaster	2.9	4.7	SH 342 – Red Oak, Lancaster	Interchange
Dallas	Lancaster	4.8	7.7	Reindeer Road	Future interchange; current at-grade intersection
Ellis	Red Oak	6.3	10.1	Nokomis Road	Future interchange; current at-grade intersection
Dallas		7.8	12.6	Ferris Road	Future interchange; current at-grade intersection
Dallas		9.9	15.9	I-45 / I-45 BL south / Malloy Bridge Road	Current eastern terminus; I-45 exit 268
1.000 mi = 1.609 km; 1.000 km = 0.621 mi

== See also ==
- Collin County Outer Loop
