= Kirkland, Texas =

- Unincorporated community
- Location within Texas Location within the United States
- Coordinates: 34°22′45″N 100°3′41″W
- Country: United States
- State: Texas
- County: Childress
- Elevation: 1,696 ft (517 m)
- Time zone: UTC-6 (Central (CST))
  - Summer (DST): UTC-5 (CDT)
- Area code: 940
- GNIS feature ID: 1360698

Kirkland is an unincorporated community in southeastern Childress County, Texas, United States. According to the Handbook of Texas, the community had a population of 102 in 2000.

== Geography ==
Kirkland is located at the intersection of U.S. Route 287 and Farm to Market Road 1033, 8 mi (13 km) southeast of Childress and 20 mi (32 km) northwest of Quanah in southwestern Childress County. The community used to be on Texas State Highway 5 in February 1930. Loop 6 also used to travel through the community from September 26, 1939 to October 5, 1972.

=== Climate ===
According to the Köppen Climate Classification system, Kirkland has a semi-arid climate, abbreviated "BSk" on climate maps.

== Education ==
Kirkland had a three-room school in the 1920s. It joined the Childress Independent School District in 1958.

== Kirkland Cemetery ==
Located approximately one-half mile from the current Kirkland town site, the Kirkland cemetery is two long wooded savannahs of marble headstones along a dirt road, containing the last earthly remains of citizens back to 1908. The land the cemetery sits on was donated by James William Sharp sometime before March 1908. James W Sharp, his first wife Alberta, as well as two children, are of the 725 well-marked gravestones that stand on this site. There are also 45 veterans, including 7 Confederate Veterans of the Civil War, 10 World War I veterans, 22 World War II veterans, three Korean War veterans and three Vietnam War veterans.
