= Sam Rayburn Tollway =

Tollway that runs from McKinney to Grapevine, Texas, USA

Sam Rayburn Tollway
- State Highway 121 Tollway

Route information
- Maintained by NTTA
- Length: 25.2 mi (40.6 km)
- Existed: 2006–present

Major junctions
- South end: SH 121 in Lewisville
- I-35E / US 77 in Lewisville; Dallas North Tollway at Plano-Frisco
- North end: US 75 / SH 121 / Spur 399 in McKinney

Location
- Country: United States
- State: Texas

Highway system
- Highways in Texas; Interstate; US; State; Former; Toll; Loops; Spurs; FM/RM; Park; Rec

The Sam Rayburn Tollway (formerly the State Highway 121 Tollway) is a controlled-access toll road operated by the North Texas Tollway Authority that runs from Grapevine to McKinney. Its frontage roads are signed SH 121.

The original portion of the toll road from Business 121 near Coppell to FM 2281 opened in May 2006, and toll collection started December 1 of that year. The tolled portion extended to Hillcrest Road in Plano/Frisco on August 31, 2008. The tollway was extended to Custer Road on September 1, 2009, and again to Hardin Boulevard in McKinney on October 1, 2009.

The tollway (formerly named 121 Tollway) was renamed in honor of Sam Rayburn at a North Texas Tollway Authority meeting on March 16, 2009.

The tollway also currently features two five-level stack interchanges, at Dallas North Tollway and I-35E.

== History ==
The Sam Rayburn Tollway project was divided into five segments, all of which have been completed.

- Segment 1, from Denton Tap Road to Old Denton Road, opened to traffic in July 2006.
- Segment 2, which runs from Old Denton Road to Hillcrest Road, officially opened to traffic on September 1, 2008, when NTTA took full responsibility for Segments 1 and 2 as well as the operation, maintenance and construction of the remaining segments of the Sam Rayburn Tollway.
- NTTA contractors began work on Segment 3 of the Sam Rayburn Tollway in March 2008. On September 1, 2009, the NTTA opened the main lanes from Hillcrest Road to just east of Custer Road. On September 29, 2009, the North Texas Toll Authority opened the main lanes from just east of Custer Road to west of Hardin Boulevard.
- Segment 4 encompasses the Sam Rayburn Tollway/US 75 interchange, from west of Hardin Boulevard to just east of U.S. 75. Construction on this portion of the corridor began in December 2008. Four major direct-connecting ramps were open to traffic in December 2010. The last two ramps were opened in March 2011.
- The Sam Rayburn Tollway/Dallas North Tollway interchange is referred to as Segment 5. The North Texas Toll Authority began construction on Segment 5 in February 2010. It was completed in 2012.

== Exit list ==
Almost all exits include access to SH 121, which follows the frontage roads. Due to the nearly continuous frontage road, most exits on the Tollway serve more than one roadway. All exits are unnumbered.

County	Location	mi	km	Destinations	Notes
Denton	Lewisville	0.0	0.0	SH 121 south / Bus. SH 121 north – DFW Airport, Ft Worth, Lewisville	Continues south as SH 121; southern terminus of Business SH 121
Dallas	Coppell–Lewisville line	0.9	1.4	SH 121 north / Denton Tap Road	No southbound signage for SH 121
Denton	Lewisville	1.6	2.6	Denton Tap Main Lane Gantry	
Denton	Lewisville	2.2	3.5	MacArthur Boulevard	Tolled southbound exit and northbound entrance
Denton	Lewisville	3.2	5.1	I-35E – Denton, Dallas	Tolled exit to I-35E north; Exits 447A-448A (I-35E)
Denton	Lewisville	3.5	5.6	SH 121 south / Lake Vista Drive	Southern terminus of the concurrency with SH 121; southbound exit and northbound entrance
Denton	Carrollton	4.5	7.2	Marchant Boulevard, Huffines Boulevard	
Denton	Carrollton	5.0	8.0	SH 121 north / Hebron Parkway	Northern terminus of the concurrency with SH 121; no SH 121 signage southbound
Denton	Carrollton	6.4	10.3	Carrollton Parkway	Tolled northbound exit and southbound entrance
Denton	Lewisville	7.2	11.6	FM 544 (Parker Road)	Tolled northbound exit and southbound entrance; southbound exit is via the FM 2281 interchange
Denton	Lewisville	7.8	12.6	FM 2281 (Old Denton Road)	Tolled northbound exit and southbound entrance; also signed for FM 544 southbound
Denton	Lewisville	8.1	13.0	Bus. SH 121 south	No direct northbound exit; northern terminus of Business SH 121
Denton	Lewisville	8.8	14.2	Standridge Drive / Castle Hills Drive	Tolled interchange
Denton	Lewisville	9.1	14.6	Josey Main Lane Gantry	
Denton	Lewisville	9.6	15.4	FM 423 north (Main Street (The Colony)) / Josey Lane (Lewisville)	Tolled interchange; southern terminus of FM 423
Denton	The Colony	10.5	16.9	Paige Road / Plano Pkwy	Southbound exit via South Colony Boulevard interchange
Denton	The Colony	11.2	18.0	S Colony Boulevard / Nebraska Furniture Mart Drive	South Colony Boulevard not accessible northbound; tolled southbound exit and northbound entrance
Denton	The Colony	12.0	19.3	Spring Creek Parkway	Tolled southbound exit and northbound entrance
Collin	Plano–Frisco line	12.9	20.8	Legacy Drive	
Collin	Plano–Frisco line	13.0	20.9	Dallas Parkway	Southbound exit is via the Parkwood Boulevard interchange
Collin	Plano–Frisco line	13.8	22.2	Dallas North Tollway	
Collin	Plano–Frisco line	14.3	23.0	Parkwood Boulevard	Tolled northbound exit; also signed for Dallas Parkway southbound
Collin	Plano–Frisco line	14.9	24.0	SH 289 (Preston Road)	
Collin	Plano–Frisco line	16.0	25.7	Hillcrest Road (Frisco)/Rasor Boulevard (Plano), Ohio Drive	Tolled northbound exit and southbound entrance; Ohio Drive signed at SH 289 exit southbound
Collin	Plano–Frisco line	17.3	27.8	Coit Road	Tolled northbound exit and southbound entrance; to Centennial Medical Center
Collin	Plano–Frisco line	18.4	29.6	Independence Parkway	Tolled northbound exit and southbound entrance
Collin	Plano–Frisco– Allen–McKinney quadripoint	19.6	31.5	FM 2478 (Custer Road)	Tolled northbound exit and southbound entrance; no direct southbound exit (signed at Exchange Parkway)
Collin	Plano–Frisco– Allen–McKinney quadripoint	19.6	31.5	Custer Main Lane Gantry	
Collin	Allen–McKinney line	20.3	32.7	Exchange Parkway (Allen)/Craig Ranch Parkway (McKinney)	Tolled southbound exit and northbound entrance
Collin	Allen–McKinney line	21.2	34.1	Alma Drive (Allen)/Alma Road (McKinney)	Tolled southbound exit and northbound entrance; no direct northbound exit (signed at Exchange Parkway), Alma Drive is signed on the exit sign.
Collin	Allen–McKinney line	22.2	35.7	Stacy Road	Tolled southbound exit and northbound entrance
Collin	Allen–McKinney line	22.9	36.9	Lake Forest Drive (McKinney)/Watters Road (Allen)	Tolled southbound exit and northbound entrance
Collin	Allen–McKinney line	23.8	38.3	Hardin Boulevard (McKinney)/Chelsea Boulevard (Allen)	Tolled southbound exit and northbound entrance
Collin	Allen–McKinney line	24.2	38.9	Frontage Road	Northbound exit only; to US 75 frontage roads
Collin	Allen–McKinney line	24.5	39.4	US 75 / SH 121 north – Sherman, Dallas	Exit 38C (US 75)
Collin	Allen–McKinney line	25.2	40.6	To SH 5 / Medical Center Drive	To Medical City McKinney; continues north as Spur 399
1.000 mi = 1.609 km; 1.000 km = 0.621 mi: Concurrency terminus; Electronic toll collection; Incomplete access
