= Texas State Highway Spur 399 =

State highway in Texas

State Highway Spur 399

Route information
- Maintained by TxDOT
- Length: 1.1 mi (1.8 km)
- Existed: March 2, 1989–present

Major junctions
- West end: Sam Rayburn Tollway in McKinney
- US 75 / SH 121 in McKinney
- East end: SH 5 in McKinney

Location
- Country: United States
- State: Texas
- Counties: Collin

Highway system
- Highways in Texas; Interstate; US; State; Former; Toll; Loops; Spurs; FM/RM; Park; Rec
← Spur 398	→ Spur 400

Spur 399 is a short, limited-access spur highway located in Collin County, Texas, and connects State Highway 121 (SH 121) and the US Highway 75 (US 75, Central Expressway) to SH 5, in McKinney. The highway is just over a mile long, and was originally designated in 1964, but was redesignated in 1989.

== Route description ==
Spur 399 begins where SH 121 branches off the Sam Rayburn Tollway, to merge with the Central Expressway. After the interchange, the highway passes a few empty commercial building lots, before passing the Collin Higher Education Center to the north, and the Medical Center of McKinney to the south. The frontage roads then, depending on the direction, merge or exit the highway. The road passes a small field, before reaching its eastern terminus, an at-grade intersection with SH 5. The freeway portion of the highway contains only one exit, for US 75 south, from the eastbound lanes, but the highway's frontage roads give access to and receive access from both directions of the Central Expressway.

== History ==
Spur 399 was designated on May 4, 1964 from US 75 to SH 5. On March 2, 1989, it was transferred to SH 121, and Spur 399 was reused for old SH 121 instead.

== Extension ==
TXDOT has announced a plan to extend this spur 6 miles to connect with US 380 east of McKinney. Earliest start of the project is, quote: "earliest that construction can begin will be 2026". The extension was designated on June 20, 2025.

== Junction list ==
The entire route is in McKinney, Collin County. All exits are unnumbered.

mi	km	Destinations	Notes
		US 75 / SH 121 / Sam Rayburn Tollway – Plano, Sherman	Road continues as Sam Rayburn Tollway
		Medical Center Drive	Interchange; access to Medical City McKinney
		SH 5 – Allen, McKinney	Eastern terminus
		Airport Drive	Future Highway interchange; Access to McKinney National Airport
		FM 546 east / CR 317 – Branch, Lucas	Future Highway interchange
		US 380 – Princeton, McKinney	Future Eastern terminus, continues as US 380
1.000 mi = 1.609 km; 1.000 km = 0.621 mi: Unopened
