= Dunbar Cave State Park =

State park in Tennessee, United States

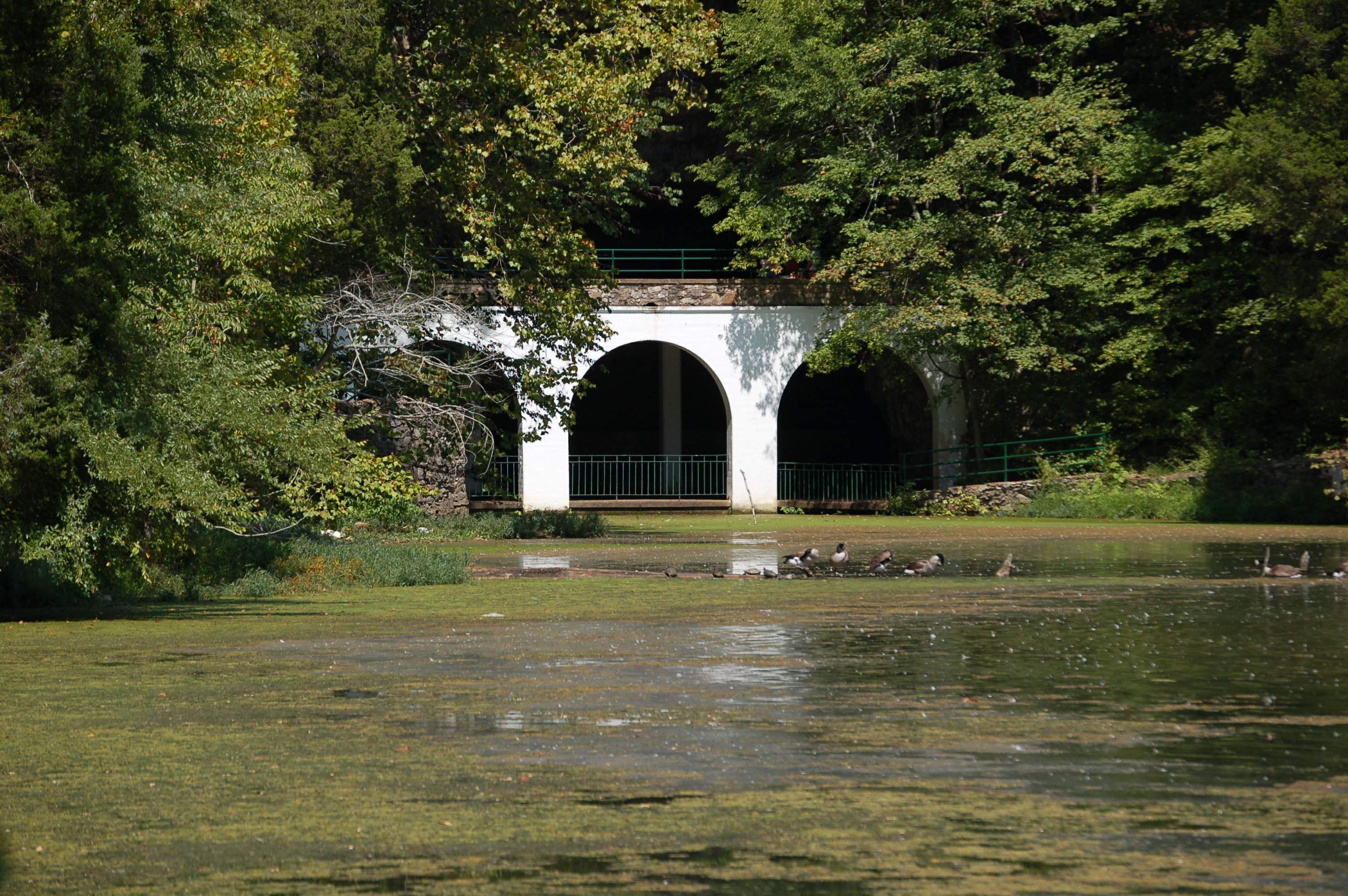
- Dunbar Cave State Park scene
- Interactive map of Dunbar Cave State Park
- Type: Tennessee State Park
- Location: Clarksville, TN
- Coordinates: 36.5503°N 87.3059°W
- Area: 110 acres (0.45 km^{2})
- Operator: Tennessee Department of Environment and Conservation
- Open: Park is open Year around; Cave is Open May through August
- Website: Dunbar Cave

Dunbar Cave State Park is a 110 acre (450,000 m²) protected area in Clarksville, Tennessee. Dunbar Cave is the 393rd largest known cave complex in the world, stretching 9.85 miles (15.85 km) inward. The cave is located in an area of karst topography, including sinkholes, springs, and limestone bedrock. In front of the cave entrance is a large concrete poured structure with three distinct arches and the manmade Swan Lake. In March 2010 the cave was temporarily closed to tours and visitors because a bat infected with White nose syndrome was found in the cave.

== History ==
In the late 1970s a team of archaeologists found artifacts dating back to the Paleo Indian time, which was from 10000–8000 B.C. The bulk of artifacts found were dated to the Archaic time, which was from 8000–1000 B.C. The area, while still inhabited during the Woodland time, which was from 1000 B.C. – 800 A.D., was not as populated due to the fact that the Native Americans at this time had started to rely heavily on growing crops, and the land around the Red River and Cumberland River were more conducive to growing crops than the rocky terrain around the cave. During the Mississippian era, which was from 800–1550 A.D., the cave was used by Native Americans for ceremonial purposes. There have been pictographs found in the cave depicting religious symbols indicating that the cave was believed to be an important spiritual location. By 1784 it had been claimed by Thomas Dunbar, who paid for the land but never got the deed. Sometime around 1790, a land surveyor named Robert Nelsen realized this and claimed the land for his own. A legal battle ensued, and in 1792 the US Government awarded the land to Robert Nelsen, and the Dunbar family was removed from the land. During the Mexican–American War, the cave was used to mine saltpeter for gunpowder. In 1858, developers saw the potential in the area, along with nearby Idaho Springs, and the first cabins were built there. After the Civil War, the springs and the cave were acquired by J. A. Tate, who constructed a two-story hotel on the site.

By 1931, the area had hosted numerous social events, including dances, concerts, and fairs, and was in need of repair and renovation. At the time, the state had just completed a new road in front of the hotel and an opportunity arose. A couple of local businessmen cleaned up the site, adding additional recreational facilities, including a concrete swimming pool, bathhouse, and tennis courts, and restoring and expanding the size of the hotel. The existing lake was also dammed up, increasing its size to 20 acres (81,000 m²).

Dunbar Cave was purchased by Roy Acuff on April 26, 1948, for $150,000. The cave was the site of musical festivities and entertainment shows, which would host big bands like Benny Goodman's and Tommy Dorsey's. Acuff also added a golf course adjacent to the lake. Over time the popularity of the cave and surrounding area declined, and the hotel burned in 1950 and was not rebuilt.

Dunbar Cave was purchased by McKay King in 1963. King operated the Dunbar Cave property until his death in 1971. The swimming pool was closed in 1967. The cave was inherited by his widow.

In 1973, the State of Tennessee, under then Governor Winfield Dunn, purchased Dunbar Cave from Mrs. McKay King, to become a State Natural Area.

In 1997, Paul Dennis Reid left the bodies of Angela Holmes and Michelle Mace at the park.

In 2002, the park shut down briefly during the state's budget cutting crisis.

== Petroglyphs ==
The more than 30 drawings and etchings found in the cave were dated to the Mississippian era (700 to 1300 CE) using torches and other artifacts found nearby. Some of the pictographs are religious symbols, with one depicting a Mississippian supernatural warrior. Park specialist Amy Wallace, geologist and author Larry E. Matthews, local historian Billy Frank Morrison, and history professor Joe Douglas discovered the Native American pictographs and petroglyphs in January 2005. Their existence was announced to the public by the State of Tennessee on July 29, 2006, during the Second Annual Dunbar Cave Day.

== 2010 White Nose Syndrome shutdown ==
Dunbar Cave has a small bat population and is closed from September through April to allow the bats undisrupted hibernation. In March 2010, a bat with White nose syndrome was discovered by researchers from Austin Peay State University doing assessments of species diversity and roosting patterns. Based on finding the infected bat, the State of Tennessee announced on March 24, 2010, that Dunbar Cave was closed to all visitors and tours were discontinued. Since 2006 when the disease was first discovered in New York, it has spread to Ontario, New Jersey, New Hampshire, and Tennessee, causing the death of over a million bats. The US Fish & Wildlife Service (USFWS) has called for a moratorium on caving activities in the affected areas, and strongly recommends that any clothing or equipment used in such areas be decontaminated after each use.
