= Texas State Highway 5 =

Highway in Texas

State Highway 5

Route information
- Maintained by TxDOT
- Length: 31.223 mi (50.249 km)
- Existed: April 29, 1959–present

Major junctions
- South end: FM 2786 in Allen
- US 380 in McKinney
- North end: US 75 in Howe

Location
- Country: United States
- State: Texas

Highway system
- Highways in Texas; Interstate; US; State; Former; Toll; Loops; Spurs; FM/RM; Park; Rec
| ← RE 4 | → Loop 5 |

State Highway 5 (SH 5) runs along the old route of U.S. Highway 75 at Howe into the city of Allen. SH 5 parallels US 75 along its length and runs alongside the former Houston and Texas Central rail line. SH 5 was created in 1959 when the new route of US 75 was established to the west. Historically, SH 5 extended into and through Plano and Richardson.

== Route history ==
The current version of SH 5 was established on April 29, 1959 initially as a replacement for the former routing of U.S. Highway 75 from Richardson north to McKinney when US 75 was rebuilt further to the west. The route was extended north to Howe on October 27, 1967 to replace another portion of US 75 that had been upgraded on a new route just to the west. Between 1987 and 2018, the southern terminus was moved northward as portions of the highway were returned to local cities: First, ending at SH 190 on May 28, 1986, then ending at the northern Plano city limit on October 28, 1987, at the Exchange Parkway in Allen on March 27, 2003, and finally, at FM 2786 (Stacy Rd.) on January 25, 2018.

== Previous routes ==
Historic SH 5

SH 5 was one of the original twenty-five state highways proposed on June 21, 1917, overlaid on top of the North Texas Highway. From 1917 the routing mostly followed present day U.S. Highway 87 from New Mexico to Amarillo. It continued on, routed along present day U.S. Highway 287 to Wichita Falls, and from there following present day U.S. Highway 82 to Texarkana. On September 17, 1923, SH 5 Loop through Avery was designated.

In 1926, U.S. Highway 385 was routed over SH 5 from New Mexico to Amarillo, and U.S. Highway 370 to Henrietta. On February 26, 1930 SH 5 Loop through Kirkland was designated. On September 16, 1937, SH 5 Loop was designated from SH 5 to SH 30 in Wichita Falls. On February 20, 1939, SH 5 Spur was designated from SH 5 to Annona. While the routes were marked concurrently, the remainder of SH 5 kept its numbering until September 26, 1939, when SH 5 was truncated to a route running from north of Amarillo to near Hartley. SH 5 Loop and SH 5 Spur became Loop 6 (Kirkland), Loop 11 (Wichita Falls), Spur 23 (Annona), and Loop 37 (Avery). SH 5 was finally cancelled on September 14, 1944 as it was never built (temporary route replaced by SH 354), only to be reassigned in its new location on April 29, 1959.

Historic SH 5A

On February 5, 1918, an intercounty highway was designated from Estelline to Farwell. On February 19, 1918, this was redesignated as a state highway and designated as SH 5A, a branch of SH 5. It was listed as such until August 21, 1923, when it was renumbered as SH 86. That same day, SH 5A was used again as a spur routing from SH 5 south and east via Annona to Avery. On July 18, 1924, the section south of Annona was cancelled. This road was erroneously omitted from the March 19, 1930 log, so was unnumbered that day. On November 30, 1932, The former SH 5A was added to the state highway log, but was renumbered as SH 180.

Historic SH 5B

SH 5B was a branch designated on May 22, 1918 from SH 5 in Clarksville southeast to SH 5 in Annona. It was cancelled on August 21, 1923.

Historic SH 5C

SH 5C was designated on January 20, 1919 as a branch of SH 5 from Bonham to Garland. On July 18, 1922, this was renumbered as SH 5C. On August 21, 1923, it was renumbered as SH 78.

Historic SH 5D

SH 5D was designated on February 19, 1923 from the New Mexico state line to the Oklahoma state line. On August 21, 1923, it was renumbered as SH 56.

== Related routes ==
South of Dallas, US 75 was supplanted by Interstate 45, though US 75 retained its designation until 1987. When US 75 was decommissioned south of downtown Dallas, the segment from south of Corsicana to north of Houston was redesignated as State Highway 75.

== Major intersections ==
| County | Location | mi | km | Destinations | Notes |
|---|---|---|---|---|---|
| Collin | Allen | | | FM 2786 east (Stacy Road) | south end of state maintenance |
| Collin | Fairview | | | FM 1378 south (Country Club Road) – Lucas | |
| Collin | McKinney | | | Spur 399 west to US 75 / SH 121 south / Sam Rayburn Tollway / Medical Center Drive – Lewisville | |
| Collin | McKinney | | | FM 546 east (Harry McKillop Boulevard) – Airport | |
| Collin | McKinney | | | East Virginia Street/East Louisiana Street | formerly Spur 359 (west) |
| Collin | McKinney | | | US 380 (University Drive) – Denton, Princeton | |
| Collin | McKinney | | | Spur 195 north – Weston | formerly FM 543 from SH 5 to US 75 |
| Collin | Melissa | | | SH 121 south to US 75 south | south end of SH 121 overlap |
| Collin | Melissa | | | SH 121 north – Trenton | north end of SH 121 overlap |
| Collin | Melissa | | | FM 545 east (Cooper Street) – Blue Ridge | |
| Collin | | | | Outer Loop Road | |
| Collin | Anna | | | FM 455 (West White Street) – Weston | |
| Collin | Anna | | | FM 2862 east (Fourth Street) – Westminster | |
| Grayson | Van Alstyne | | | FM 3133 east | |
| Grayson | Van Alstyne | | | FM 121 east (East Jefferson Street) – Pilot Grove | south end of FM 121 overlap |
| Grayson | Van Alstyne | | | FM 121 west (West Van Alstyne Parkway) to US 75 – Gunter | north end of FM 121 overlap |
| Grayson | Howe | | | Spur 381 west (Haning) | |
| Grayson | Howe | | | FM 902 east (Kosse) – Tom Bean | south end of FM 902 overlap |
| Grayson | Howe | | | US 75 / FM 902 west – Sherman, Dorchester, McKinney | north end of FM 902 overlap; US 75 exit 54 |
1.000 mi = 1.609 km; 1.000 km = 0.621 mi

== See also ==
- Interstate 45
- U.S. Route 75 in Texas
- Texas State Highway 75
- Texas State Highway Spur 5
