= Weston, Texas =

- City
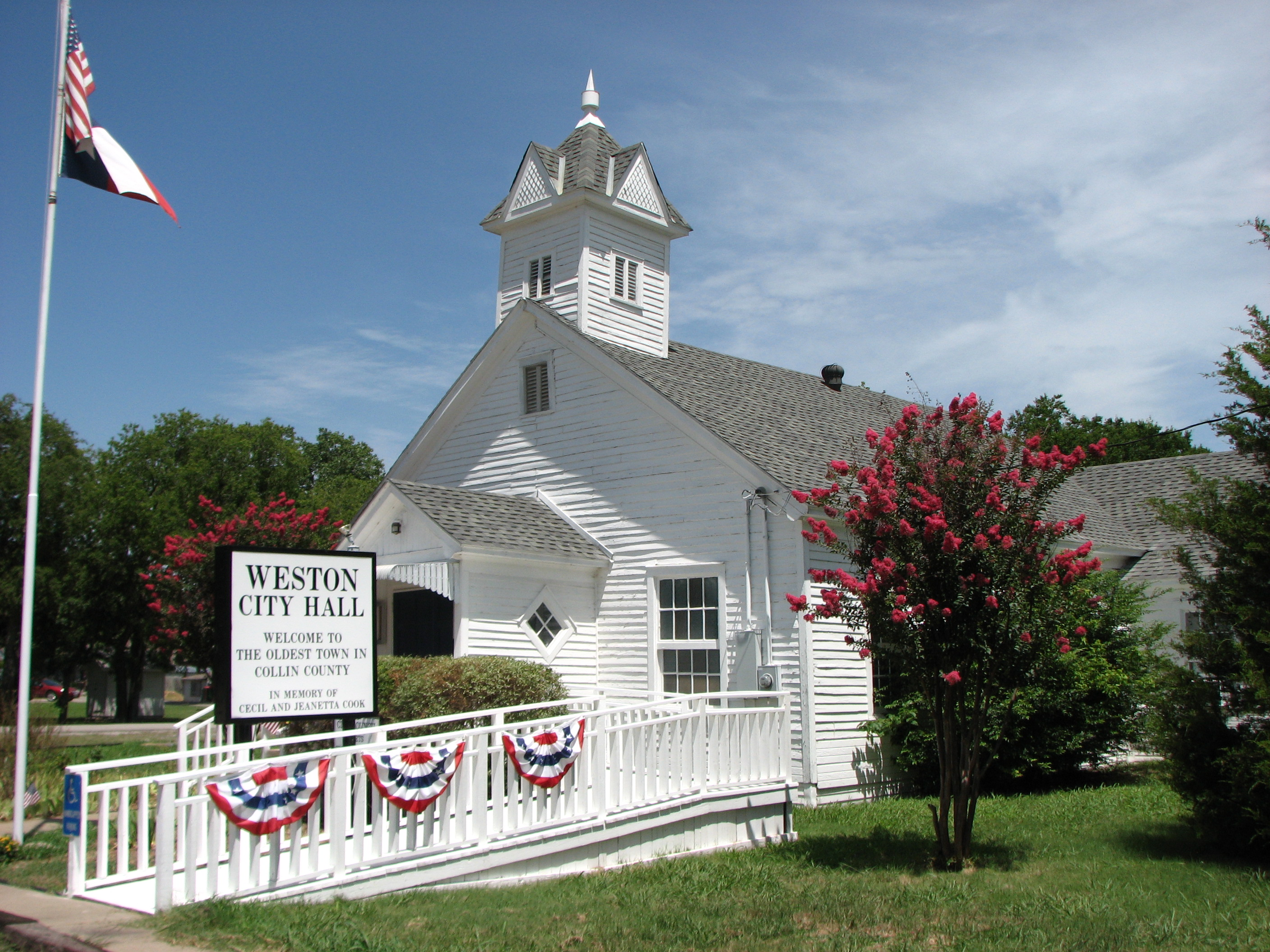
- City Hall

- Location of Weston in Collin County, Texas
- Coordinates: 33°19′48″N 96°40′03″W
- Country: United States
- State: Texas
- County: Collin

Government
  - Mayor: Matt Marchiori
  - Mayor Pro Tempore: Brian Roach

Area
  - Total: 4.52 sq mi (11.71 km^{2})
  - Land: 4.49 sq mi (11.62 km^{2})
  - Water: 0.035 sq mi (0.09 km^{2})
- Elevation: 715 ft (218 m)

Population (2020)
  - Total: 283
  - Estimate (2025): 1,140
  - Density: 63.1/sq mi (24.4/km^{2})
- Time zone: UTC-6 (Central (CST))
  - Summer (DST): UTC-5 (CDT)
- ZIP code: 75097
- Area code: 972
- FIPS code: 48-77740
- GNIS feature ID: 2412242
- Website: www.westontexas.com

Weston is a city in Collin County, Texas, United States. The population was 283 as of the 2020 census, As of 2026, Collin County estimates Weston's population at 1,303.

== Geography ==
Weston is located in northern Collin County 12 miles (19 km) north of McKinney, the county seat, 7 miles (11 km) west of Anna, and 8 miles (13 km) east of Celina. According to the United States Census Bureau, Weston has a total area of 5.2 square miles (13.5 km^{2}), of which 0.04 square miles (0.1 km^{2}), or 0.93%, is water.

== Demographics ==
Historical population
| Census | Pop. | Note | %± |
|---|---|---|---|
| 1870 | 157 | | — |
| 1880 | 166 | | 5.7% |
| 1980 | 405 | | — |
| 1990 | 362 | | −10.6% |
| 2000 | 635 | | 75.4% |
| 2010 | 563 | | −11.3% |
| 2020 | 283 | | −49.7% |
| 2025 (est.) | 1,140 | | 302.8% |
U.S. Decennial Census; Texas Almanac: 1850-2000; 2020 Census

=== 2020 census ===
As of the 2020 census, there were 283 people.

=== 2000 census ===
As of the 2000 census, there were 635 people, 235 households, and 204 families residing in the city.

In 2000, the racial and ethnic makeup of the city was 97.17% White, 0.16% Black or African American, 0.31% Asian, 2.05% from other races, and 0.31% from two or more races. Hispanic or Latino Americans of any race were 4.41% of the population. The racial and ethnic makeup in 2020 consisted of 244 non-Hispanic whites, 10 Black or African Americans, 2 Asian Americans, and 8 people of some other race. A total of 34 residents were Hispanic or Latino of any race.

From the 2000 census, there were 235 households, out of which 32.8% had children under the age of 18 living with them, 79.1% were married couples living together, 6.0% had a female householder with no husband present, and 12.8% were non-families. 11.5% of all households were made up of individuals, and 3.4% had someone living alone who was 65 years of age or older. The average household size was 2.70 and the average family size was 2.92.

In the town, the population was spread out, with 23.8% under the age of 18, 7.7% from 18 to 24, 29.0% from 25 to 44, 29.8% from 45 to 64, and 9.8% who were 65 years of age or older. The median age was 40 years. For every 100 females, there were 102.9 males. For every 100 females age 18 and over, there were 100.8 males.

The median income for a household in the city was $56,528, and the median income for a family was $59,375. Males had a median income of $44,107 versus $27,083 for females. The per capita income for the city was $25,440. About 2.3% of families and 3.8% of the population were below the poverty line, including 4.1% of those under age 18 and 2.7% of those age 65 or over. At the 2019 American Community Survey, its 94 households had a median income of $81,250.

== Education ==
Weston is served by two school districts: Celina ISD and McKinney ISD.

The Texas Legislature designated Collin College as the community college for all of Collin County and for Celina ISD, in addition to some other parts of Denton County.
