= WQHS =

WQHS may refer to:

- WQHS-DT, a television station (channel 36, virtual channel 61) licensed to Cleveland, Ohio, United States
- WQHS Radio, a student-operated radio station at the University of Pennsylvania
