= KMEC-TV =

Television station in Dallas (1967–1973)

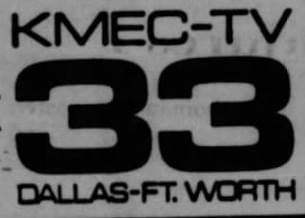
- Dallas–Fort Worth, Texas; United States
- City: Dallas, Texas
- Channels: Analog: 33 (UHF)

Ownership
- Owner: Christian Broadcasting Network, Inc.

History
- First air date: October 1, 1967
- Last air date: November 14, 1973; (6 years, 44 days)
- Former call signs: KMEC-TV (1968–1972); KBFI-TV (1972–1973); KXTX-TV (April–November 1973)

Technical information
- ERP: 1,359 kW
- HAAT: 512 m (1,680 ft)
- Transmitter coordinates: 32°34′55″N 96°58′32″W

KMEC-TV (channel 33) was a television station licensed to Dallas, Texas, United States, which served the Dallas–Fort Worth metroplex. The station broadcast in two stints, from 1967 to 1968 as KMEC-TV (owned by Maxwell Electronics Corporation) and in 1972 as KBFI-TV (owned by Berean Fellowship International). The station struggled in both incarnations and was ultimately sold to the Christian Broadcasting Network (CBN) in 1973. CBN relaunched the station as KXTX-TV that April, but KXTX-TV remained on channel 33 for just seven months; that November, after CBN bought the assets, programming inventory and license of KDTV (channel 39), it moved KXTX to that channel. Channel 33 is now used by KDAF.

== History ==
=== KMEC-TV ===
In 1965, Maxwell Electronics Corporation applied for a new television station on channel 29 in Dallas, which placed it into comparative hearing with two other applicants: Overmyer Communications and Grandview Broadcasting Company. Grandview dropped out, and in January 1967, Maxwell amended its application to specify channel 33 instead of 29. The change was part of a plan by Daniel H. Overmyer to give both applicants stations by moving the channel 27 allocation from Tyler, Texas, thus replacing 29 with 27 and 33.

With Maxwell's station approved, KMEC-TV signed on October 1, 1967. It was one of three new UHF outlets in six months in the Metroplex, having been beaten to air by KFWT-TV (channel 21) in Fort Worth and with another station, KDTV (channel 39), on the horizon. Channel 33 telecast from a transmitter at Cedar Hill and color-equipped studios at 7901 Carpenter Freeway. Its programming lineup emphasized movies, though there were also several local programs, including daytime stock market coverage, a women's show hosted by former Miss Texas Mary Lou Butler, and an interview show. For children, KMEC-TV offered the "Fun Time" show, hosted by a sad-faced clown named Percival B. Pembrock—in reality Roger A. Ready, who had spent 34 years at WFAA radio and television as an announcer. Dallas Cowboys defensive tackle and future Pro Football Hall of Fame member Bob Lilly also hosted a weekly half-hour program. A local Bozo the Clown show debuted July 1, 1968, and aired on the station through to the end.

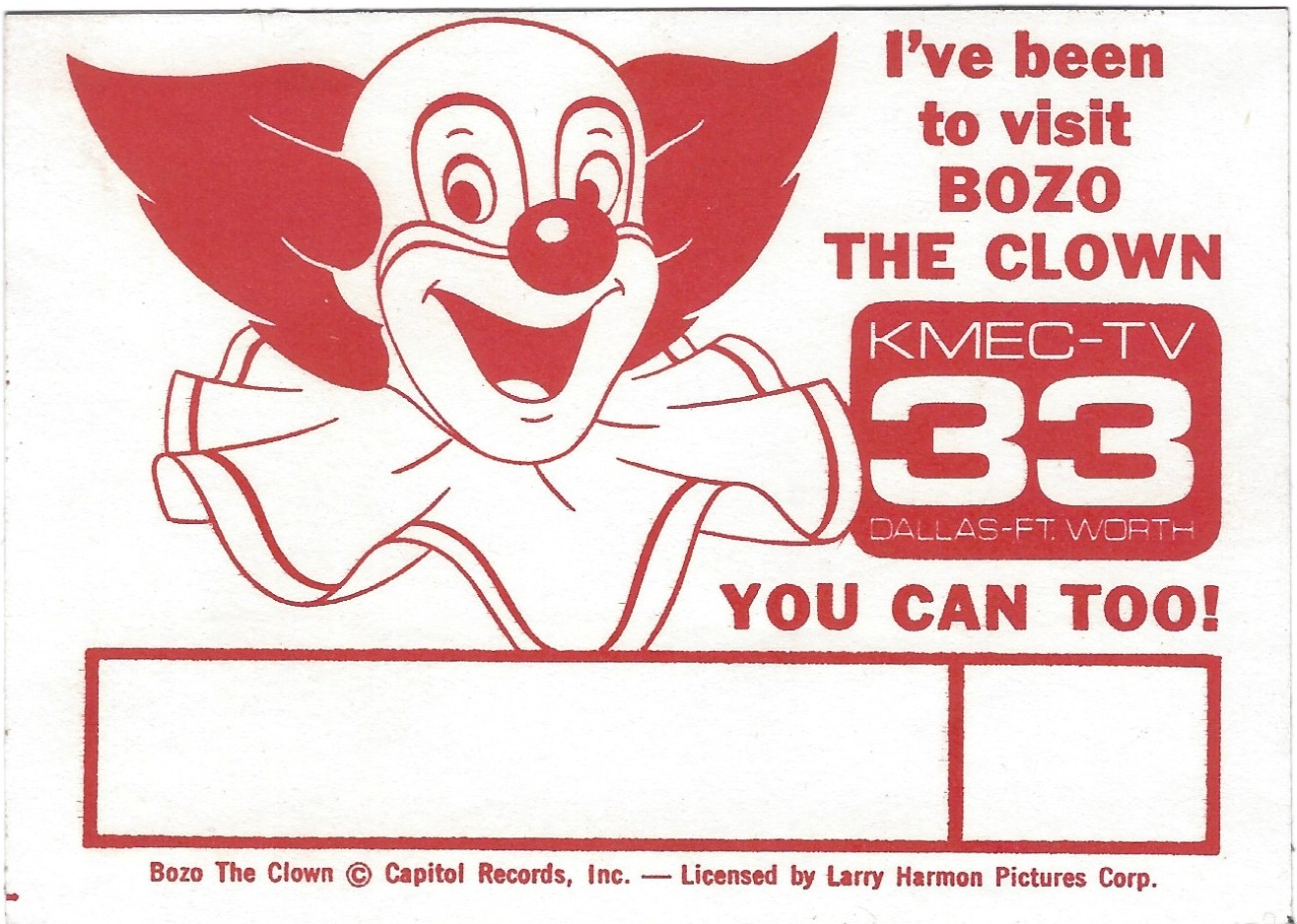
KMEC-TV sticker featuring Bozo the Clown.

After just over a year, in the face of substantial financial losses, Maxwell exited the business. On October 25, 1968, KMEC-TV announced to its viewers that it was going dark—and being sold, to Evans Broadcasting Corporation, owned by Thomas Mellon Evans, which was to return the outlet to air in the first half of 1969. Evans was on the hunt for dark UHF television stations nationwide: in addition to the purchase of KMEC, for $40,000 plus the assumption of more than $170,000 in liabilities, he owned the construction permit for KDNL-TV in St. Louis and made moves to acquire other unbuilt outlets in several eastern states. The Maxwell brothers would later make claims that the newspapers in the Dallas–Fort Worth area—the Dallas Times Herald, the Dallas Morning News and the Fort Worth Star-Telegram—relegated UHF station listings to inferior coverage and did not print them at all on Sundays, challenging the license renewals of their associated broadcast stations in the market; the newspapers did not give UHF listings equal prominence until 1969, by which time KFWT-TV and KMEC-TV had both fallen silent. Maxwell and the newspapers would settle their dispute in 1974.

=== KBFI-TV ===
At first thought, it seems there could be no worse time to go off the air for a Christian television station than at Christmas, but even this is the Lord's will.

— unidentified KBFI-TV spokesman, on station's closure

Evans ultimately did not return channel 33 to operation, and in October 1971, he sold the station for just $23,000 to the Dallas-based Berean Fellowship Foundation, affiliated with Berean Fellowship International. The licensee was Family Broadcasting, Inc. On February 21, 1972, channel 33 returned to the air as KBFI-TV, broadcasting from studios at 4500 W. Mockingbird Lane. The new station's lineup emphasized family-oriented programming, with old Westerns and weekend religious programming, including reruns of Billy Graham's crusades. Channel 33 enjoyed cable coverage in nine states.

As KBFI-TV, channel 33 continued to produce a number of local shows. Station president Warren Litzman anchored Newsday, a two-hour midday program covering news events with a particular emphasis on the Mid-Cities area. Ole Anthony, who served as a reporter and anchor for Newsday, would later become the station's news director. Local children's program Jingles the Dragon aired in afternoons. On weekday evenings, the station aired Tempo '72, a live teen show, and Club 33, a 90-minute talk and variety hour helmed by vice president Bob Dawkins.

When it signed on, KBFI-TV telecast 12 hours a day. After a brief experiment with a 24-hour schedule, channel 33 pared back its sign-on to 3:55 p.m. in October, only telecasting during the morning and afternoon hours on Sundays. Newsday moved to 4 p.m., remaining the first program of the day on KBFI-TV, while the station telecast movies all night.

At 2 a.m. on Christmas Eve, December 24, 1972, KBFI-TV fell silent, citing financial reasons.

=== KXTX-TV ===
Having ceased operations of the station, Berean sold the channel 33 construction permit to the Christian Broadcasting Network (CBN) early in 1973 for $205,000; it was CBN's fourth television station purchase and third in operation. CBN returned channel 33 to the air for the third time as KXTX-TV on April 16. Much like its sister stations—WYAH-TV in Portsmouth, Virginia and WHAE-TV in Atlanta—the new KXTX-TV aired a lineup of general entertainment fare during the daytime and early evening and shifting to religious shows, including CBN's own The 700 Club, in prime time and on Sundays.

While KXTX-TV started on channel 33, it would not remain there long. Doubleday Broadcasting—the owner of the other UHF station in Dallas, KDTV—announced in June that it was seeking to donate the facility to a nonprofit organization after a failed sale and years of financial losses. On June 27, CBN announced that it had been chosen to take on the KDTV facilities, programming and contractual obligations, and channel 39 license; Pat Robertson estimated the network would pay $2.9 million over 10 years, nearly half of that in film contracts from KDTV, and announced its plans to merge KXTX-TV's staff and programming with that of KDTV. It also declared an intention to transfer the channel 33 facility and license to another nonprofit. This never came to pass; instead, channel 33 went dark, and on November 14, 1973, KXTX-TV moved to channel 39 on the former KDTV license.

=== Future use of channel 33 in Dallas ===
Sheldon K. Turner, who had previously been the general manager of KDTV, along with two other principals, filed in September 1974 as the National Business Network to build a new channel 33 TV station in Dallas. This station, completely unrelated to prior channel 33 operations, signed on as KNBN on September 29, 1980.
