= KXTX-TV =

Television station in Dallas

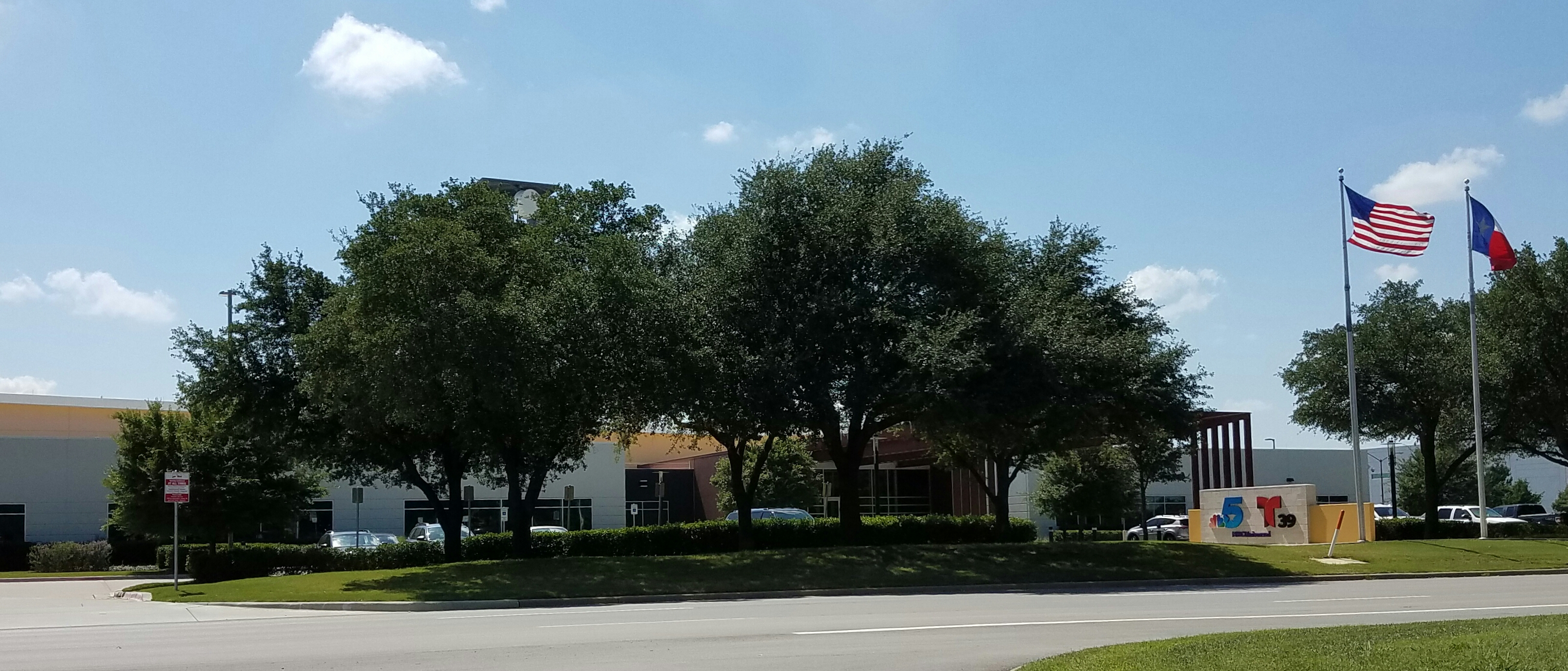
- The KXTX–KXAS studios in Fort Worth
- Dallas–Fort Worth, Texas; United States
- City: Dallas, Texas
- Channels: Digital: 36 (UHF); Virtual: 39
- Branding: Telemundo 39; Noticiero Telemundo 39 (newscasts)

Programming
- Affiliations: 39.1: Telemundo; 39.2: TeleXitos

Ownership
- Owner: Telemundo Station Group; (NBC Telemundo License LLC)
- Sister stations: KXAS-TV

History
- First air date: February 5, 1968
- Former call signs: KDTV (1968–1973)
- Former channel numbers: Analog: 39 (UHF, 1968–2009); Digital: 40 (UHF, 2002–2019)
- Former affiliations: Independent (1968–January 1995, July 1995–2001); The WB (January–July 1995)
- Call sign meaning: Christ (X) for Texas

Technical information
- Licensing authority: FCC
- Facility ID: 35994
- ERP: 925 kW
- HAAT: 496.6 m (1,629 ft)
- Transmitter coordinates: 32°35′7″N 96°58′7″W

Links
- Public license information: Public file; LMS
- Website: www.telemundodallas.com

KXTX-TV (channel 39) is a television station licensed to Dallas, Texas, United States, serving as the Dallas–Fort Worth metroplex with programming from the Spanish-language network Telemundo. It is owned and operated by NBCUniversal's Telemundo Station Group alongside NBC outlet KXAS-TV (channel 5). The two stations share studios at the CentrePort Business Park in Fort Worth; KXTX-TV's transmitter is located in Cedar Hill, Texas.

Channel 39 in Dallas began broadcasting as KDTV on February 5, 1968. It was built by Doubleday Broadcasting Co., a subsidiary of publisher Doubleday and Company, and operated as an English-language independent station emphasizing business news and sports coverage. It struggled to gain ratings traction in the market, and by 1973, it was the only unprofitable station Doubleday owned. As a result, Doubleday sought to give the station away to a non-profit entity. The Christian Broadcasting Network (CBN), which had just entered the market on channel 33, acquired KDTV and moved its station, KXTX-TV, to channel 39, occupying channel 39's studios on Harry Hines Boulevard. CBN primarily programmed religious and family-friendly entertainment shows, though it began to broaden the appeal of its program lineup in the early 1980s to be more competitive in the market. It attempted to sell the station twice in the decade, but no sale eventuated.

Beginning in June 1994, KXAS-TV began operating and programming KXTX-TV under a local marketing agreement. Channel 39 began serving as overflow for pre-empted NBC programming, and for six months in 1995 it was the market's affiliate of The WB. Beginning in 1996, the station aired Texas Rangers baseball games as part of a wide-ranging contract between the team and KXAS-TV owner LIN Media. LIN was purchased in 1997 by private equity firm Hicks, Muse, Tate & Furst; one of the firm's principals, Tom Hicks, bought the Rangers and also owned the Dallas Stars hockey team. The next year, LIN transferred its operating agreement to a new sports business controlled by Hicks, Southwest Sports Group. Southwest Sports Group analyzed using channel 39 as the centerpiece of a regional sports network for Rangers and Stars games but ultimately decided to sell the teams' media rights to Fox Sports Southwest.

In 2000, Southwest Sports acquired the license from CBN and immediately attempted to sell KXTX-TV to Pappas Telecasting, which would have used it as a key station in its planned Azteca América network. Financing difficulties delayed the network's launch and caused the deal to collapse. Telemundo then stepped in to buy KXTX, which replaced KFWD as the network's outlet in the Metroplex on January 1, 2002. At the same time, NBC bought Telemundo; channel 39 moved from Dallas to KXAS-TV's Fort Worth studios in 2006. The station produces local Spanish-language newscasts as well as a morning news program seen on Telemundo stations across Texas.

== KDTV ==
On February 1, 1966, Trigg-Vaughn Stations Inc. applied to the Federal Communications Commission (FCC) for a construction permit to build a new TV station on ultra high frequency (UHF) channel 39 in Dallas. Trigg-Vaughn owned radio stations in several Western states as well as two TV stations in Texas: KROD-TV in El Paso and KOSA-TV in Odessa. The FCC granted Trigg-Vaughn the permit on June 2. KDTV was a station on paper only when Trigg-Vaughn sold its entire station group to Doubleday in February 1967.

Construction of KDTV took place during 1967 and early 1968. The station would broadcast from a tower in Cedar Hill, the primary TV transmission site in the region, and maintain studios at 3900 Harry Hines Boulevard near downtown Dallas. KDTV's construction also coincided with a boom in new UHF stations in the Metroplex; two additional stations, KFWT-TV on channel 21 and KMEC-TV on channel 33, went on the air in late 1967.

KDTV began broadcasting on February 5, 1968. The new station's programming consisted broadly of three elements. During the day, KDTV offered Stock Market Observer, a rolling block of business news and information for investors, using equipment developed by Scantlin Electronics. Scantlin also supplied a wire of stories from The Wall Street Journal for the program, which first began airing on a station in Chicago the year before. The station also featured a variety of local sports events; Frank Filesi served as its first sports director. In the first year, channel 39 carried Dallas Chaparrals basketball, Dallas Blackhawks hockey, Dallas–Fort Worth Spurs baseball, and Dallas Tornado soccer. In addition, KDTV offered public affairs show 3900 Harry Hines and alternative news coverage alongside syndicated shows and movies.

On May 7, 1969, a windstorm knocked down the original Cedar Hill tower. KDTV was off the air for a total of twelve days; the replacement tower was completed in late October. The station continued with its mix of programming for several years. In 1972, it was the first television broadcast partner of the new Texas Rangers baseball team, leading a 12-station TV network and airing 26 Sunday and Wednesday contests; however, the team moved its games to KDFW-TV in 1973.

Channel 39 struggled under Doubleday. The station failed to make headway against Fort Worth–based KTVT (channel 11), the primary independent station in the region; by 1972, it had four percent of the market, while KTVT commanded 17 percent. It lost nearly $2 million in each of its first two years of broadcasting; while the other Doubleday Broadcasting stations were said to be "substantially profitable" by 1972, KDTV was the lone exception. A 1972 feature on Doubleday & Co. in The New York Times cited Dallas business leaders in finding that the station lacked leadership and broadcasting expertise in management. The stock market programming, which had been a fixture of KDTV since it debuted, was discontinued at the end of March 1973; Turner, who had left as general manager of channel 39 the year before, bought the rights to the program and formed the National Business Network to market it. (Note: The National Business Network would file for and win a construction permit for channel 33, KNBN-TV, which began in 1980.)

== Christian Broadcasting Network ownership ==
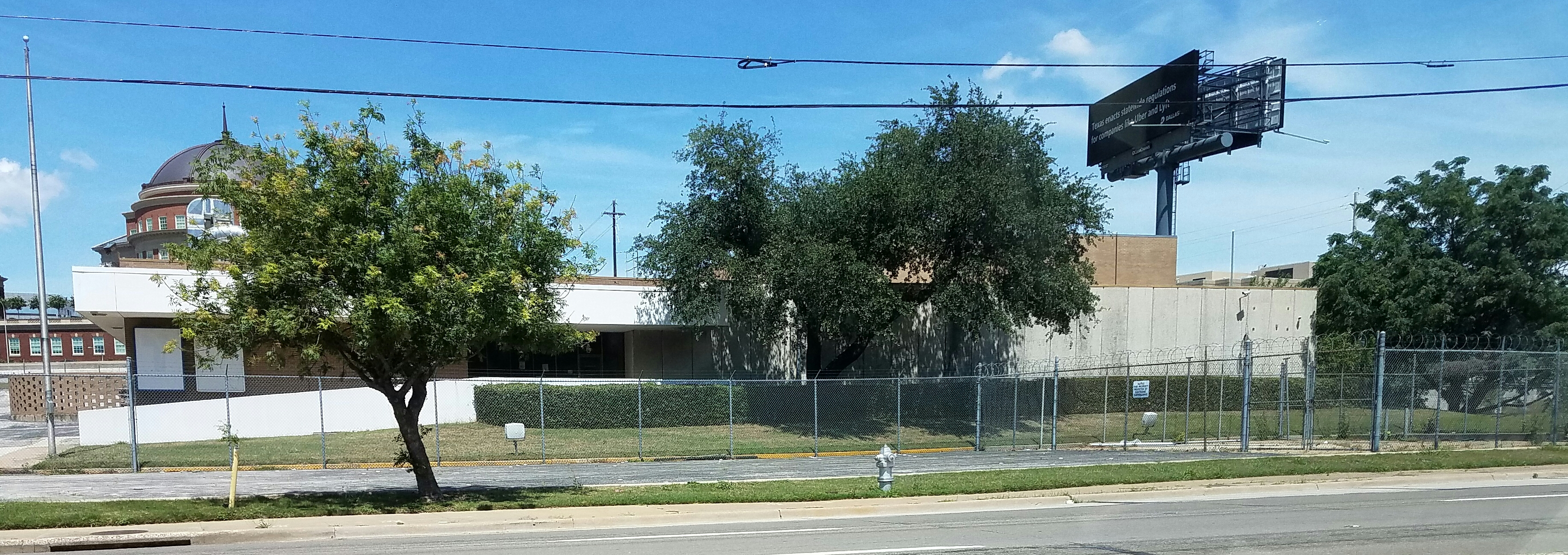
The KDTV/KXTX studios at 3900 Harry Hines Boulevard north of downtown Dallas

=== Doubleday donation ===
As a result of KDTV's poor financial condition and a failure to sell the station, Doubleday began negotiating to transfer it to a non-profit organization, with four groups vying over the course of June 1973 to receive the donation. Of these, two were educational broadcasters. The Dallas Independent School District (DISD) had been airing instructional programs over KERA-TV (channel 13), and the district entered into talks with Doubleday. If DISD acquired the station, it would have moved all of its programs for schools to channel 39, which would deprive KERA-TV of a vital source of revenue. KERA-TV itself expressed interest in acquiring channel 39, not only as a secondary outlet for its programming but also to move its television production facility to 3900 Harry Hines and leave its existing studios for use by the then-planned KERA FM. However, in the donation from Doubleday, KERA would also have had to take on $1.2 million in KDTV's programming contracts, consisting of programming incompatible with its public television format, and a 20-year studio lease. Nonetheless, KERA intensively lobbied for the channel, going as far as to enlist the help of journalist and PBS show host Bill Moyers to present its proposal.

The other two entrants each had religious orientation. The Trinity Foundation had been formed as an outgrowth of a recent prayer breakfast; president Ole Anthony told The Dallas Morning News, "Our purpose is communicating in any way possible the love, grace and sufficiency of Jesus Christ." Trinity also proposed giving airtime to Dallas schools for educational programs and nighttime programming to reach "unchurched" viewers. The other applicant was the Christian Broadcasting Network (CBN), which had recently entered Dallas by buying from Berean Fellowship and reactivating the then-silent channel 33, which returned to air as KXTX-TV on April 16. Much like CBN's two other TV outlets—WYAH-TV in Portsmouth, Virginia, and WHAE-TV in Atlanta—the station aired a lineup of general entertainment fare during the daytime and early evening and shifting to religious shows, including CBN's own The 700 Club, in prime time and on Sundays.

On June 27, CBN announced that it had been chosen to take on the KDTV facilities, programming and contractual obligations, and channel 39 license; CBN founder Pat Robertson estimated the network would pay $2.9 million over 10 years, nearly half of that in film contracts from KDTV, and announced its plans to merge KXTX-TV's staff and programming with that of KDTV in the channel 39 studios. Robertson promised that the transaction represented "not the demise of one station but a combination of two". CBN also declared an intention to transfer the channel 33 facility and license to another nonprofit. This never came to pass; instead, channel 33 went dark, and on November 14, 1973, KXTX-TV moved to channel 39 on the former KDTV license. The network had previously announced that when the combination became effective, the merged channel 39 would expand its broadcast day.

CBN maintained a generally conservative editorial and program policy at its stations. This was typified in its 1979 decision to remove evangelist Ernest Angley from the KXTX-TV programming lineup after five years. Station management reported that they had received multiple comments about Angley's style, which station manager Roger Baerwolf called "controversial" and "effeminate".

=== Seeking a broader audience ===
We're trying to get the secular audience to try Channel 39 and maybe stick around long enough for Pat Robertson's message to hold them.

— Frank Filesi, KXTX-TV sports coordinator, on channel 39's programming revamp at the start of the 1980s

At the end of the 1970s, KXTX-TV began broadening its program offerings in an attempt to reach a wider audience and shed an image that channel 39 exclusively provided religious programming. For one week in May 1979, the station aired a television simulcast of Ron Chapman's morning show on KVIL radio, which was scheduled immediately after an airing of CBN's The 700 Club. It also beefed up its coverage of sports; Filesi returned to channel 39 as sports coordinator and led an increase in live sports coverage as well as a new monthly sports anthology program, TV 39 Sports Magazine, hosted by sportscaster Frank Glieber. However, CBN's policy of barring alcohol advertising hindered the station as a sports player. In launching the Independent Network News on channel 39 in June 1980, Baerwolf noted that the changes were also designed to help the station be a competitive independent in the market. Most notably, the station advertised its new turn with billboards heralding the arrival of reruns of Wonder Woman.

The station served the teens and children's market with some of the most popular syndicated shows in television among those audiences. It ventured as far as to air the syndicated The Uncle Floyd Show in late-night hours in 1982; the syndicator provided a special edit to conform with channel 39's content standards. However, KXTX-TV's deemphasis of religion—by 1984, The 700 Club was airing just once a day in prime time—left a lane open for a new, more purely religious television station in the Metroplex. In 1984, Eldred Thomas started KLTJ-TV (channel 49), a Christian station using Trinity Broadcasting Network programming. Thomas told Ed Bark of The Dallas Morning News, "Had [channel 39] remained Christian, we would not have started another Christian station."

In the 1980s, the market swelled locally and contracted regionally. In a six-month span, three new commercial independent stations went on the air: KNBN (the revived channel 33, later KRLD-TV and KDAF) in 1980 and KTXA (channel 21) and KTWS-TV (channel 27, later KDFI) in 1981. (Note: KNBN-TV signed on September 29, 1980. KTXA began broadcasting January 4, 1981. KTWS-TV began broadcasting January 26, 1981.) These new startups joined KTVT and KXTX-TV to give Dallas–Fort Worth five independent stations, the most of any market in the country; in this battle, channels 27 and 39 lagged in their available cash to buy programs. KXTX-TV, with its vast regional cable carriage, began to lose it in the early 1980s due to changes in copyright law and other factors. Beginning in January 1983, the Copyright Royalty Tribunal raised the rates that cable companies had to pay for importing out-of-market signals by 375 percent. However, KXTX was somewhat insulated from this issue because the FCC continued to classify it as a "specialty channel" due to its religious program orientation. When the FCC moved to reclassify KXTX as a conventional independent effective at the end of 1990, the station was dropped from cable systems in cities including Wichita Falls, Longview, and Marshall. For other reasons, KXTX lost its coverage in more far-flung places, including Tulsa, Oklahoma—where it was replaced by co-owned CBN Cable in 1982—and Shreveport, Louisiana, in 1988.

In 1984, CBN—renamed Continental Broadcasting Network—put KXTX-TV and its Continental Productions syndication division on the market. The move came at a time when several new-to-market UHF stations in the Metroplex had been sold, including KNBN-TV in 1983 and KTWS-TV and KTXA in 1984. However, CBN withdrew the station when bids came in lower than expected. Two years later, citing a drop in projected donations, the network tried again to sell the three stations it still owned: KXTX-TV, WYAH-TV, and WXNE-TV in Boston. In its second attempt to sell channel 39, CBN was hampered by expensive, long-term syndicated program contracts that caused interest in the station to lag. After WXNE-TV was sold to the Fox network, Family Group Broadcasting of Tampa, Florida, bid on WYAH and KXTX. A sale was announced in October, but within a month, Family Group rescinded its offer, citing changes in tax law that made the deal impossible to finance via a stock sale. Shortly after, the market for independent stations grew colder, particularly in the wake of the bankruptcy filing of the Grant Broadcasting System.

During the 1980s, the station produced World Class Championship Wrestling, featuring Fritz Von Erich; the wrestling promotion, at its height in the early part of the decade, aired in more than 60 markets and in Japan, Argentina, and the Middle East. Wrestling was the station's biggest single ratings draw, and Robertson accepted its place in channel 39's lineup because it also featured the highest advertising rates on the station. In the spring of 1986, KXTX reached an agreement with WFAA-TV (channel 8) to carry ABC prime time programming preempted by that station; this arrangement was short-lived as a result of a situation on April 16 involving delays in ABC prime time programming due to a special report. The station continued to specialize in family-friendly programs—CBN described the lineup in official material as "programs which can be viewed by people of all ages without their becoming offended"—and weekend western movies.

=== Local marketing agreement with KXAS-TV ===
On June 2, 1994, LIN Broadcasting and its local station, Fort Worth-based NBC affiliate KXAS-TV (channel 5), took over advertising sales and programming duties for channel 39 under a local marketing agreement (LMA). It was the second LMA to take effect in the Metroplex in two weeks, after a pact that saw KDFW-TV begin programming KDFI-TV. Immediately, channel 39 added rebroadcasts of KXAS-TV newscasts and the syndicated Bill Nye the Science Guy to its program schedule. The agreement quickly saw use during the murder trial of O. J. Simpson, when KXAS shunted NBC News coverage of the trial to KXTX in order to carry its regular early evening newscasts, and during the NFL preseason so channel 5 could air a Dallas Cowboys game while KXTX picked up NBC's Thursday night prime time lineup.

Channel 39 played a minor role in a major affiliation switch in the Dallas–Fort Worth market. In 1993, Gaylord Broadcasting, owner of KTVT, had agreed to affiliate that station with The WB, a new national TV network to launch in January 1995. However, in May 1994, Fox announced that it would affiliate with 12 New World Communications-owned TV stations, including KDFW-TV, which had been the CBS affiliate. Gaylord soon began receiving overtures from CBS to affiliate with them. After exchanging lawsuits with The WB over its verbal commitment to that network, the company reached a deal to affiliate KTVT and KSTW in Tacoma, Washington, with CBS. Fox sold the station it owned in Dallas, KDAF, to Renaissance Communications; Renaissance announced its intention to pick up the WB affiliation in the market. However, it was not able to do so until July, leaving The WB to air on channel 39 for its first six months.

KTVT's affiliation switch to CBS shook loose a series of local sports rights. Channel 11's contract with the Texas Rangers ended after the 1995 season, and the station also opted under its contract not to show games were the season to start with replacement players amid an ongoing strike. LIN signed a deal under which KXTX would have aired 89 of the 90 games destined for KTVT, with Opening Day telecast on KXAS. This contingency did not come to pass; instead, channel 39 provided a home for displaced CBS prime time programs that KTVT preempted for baseball. However, LIN and the Rangers kept in contact, and ahead of the 1996 season, LIN signed a sweeping five-year deal with the team. Not only would KXAS and KXTX air at least 90 games, but LIN would take over production and distribution of the telecasts and build a $10 million production facility at The Ballpark in Arlington. LIN surprised observers by not selling a cable package to Prime Sports Southwest; instead, it set a lineup of 15 games on KXAS and 123 on KXTX.

The Dallas Mavericks of the NBA, also displaced by KTVT switching to CBS, initially moved to KDFI, but after one season, the team signed with KXTX-TV to air 35 games. The Mavericks remained on channel 39 through 1999, when they signed with new independent station KSTR-TV (channel 49).

On October 12, 1996, an accident caused by a crew installing a new antenna on the structure resulted in the collapse of the station's 1,550-foot (472 m) transmitter tower in Cedar Hill. The tower held the antennas for KXTX-TV and four local FM radio stations. Channel 39 was off the air for eight days before returning using an auxiliary antenna on KXAS-TV's tower. LIN and the tower services company sued each other in the wake of the collapse; the two companies reached an out-of-court settlement in 1998.

=== Hicks and Southwest Sports Group management ===
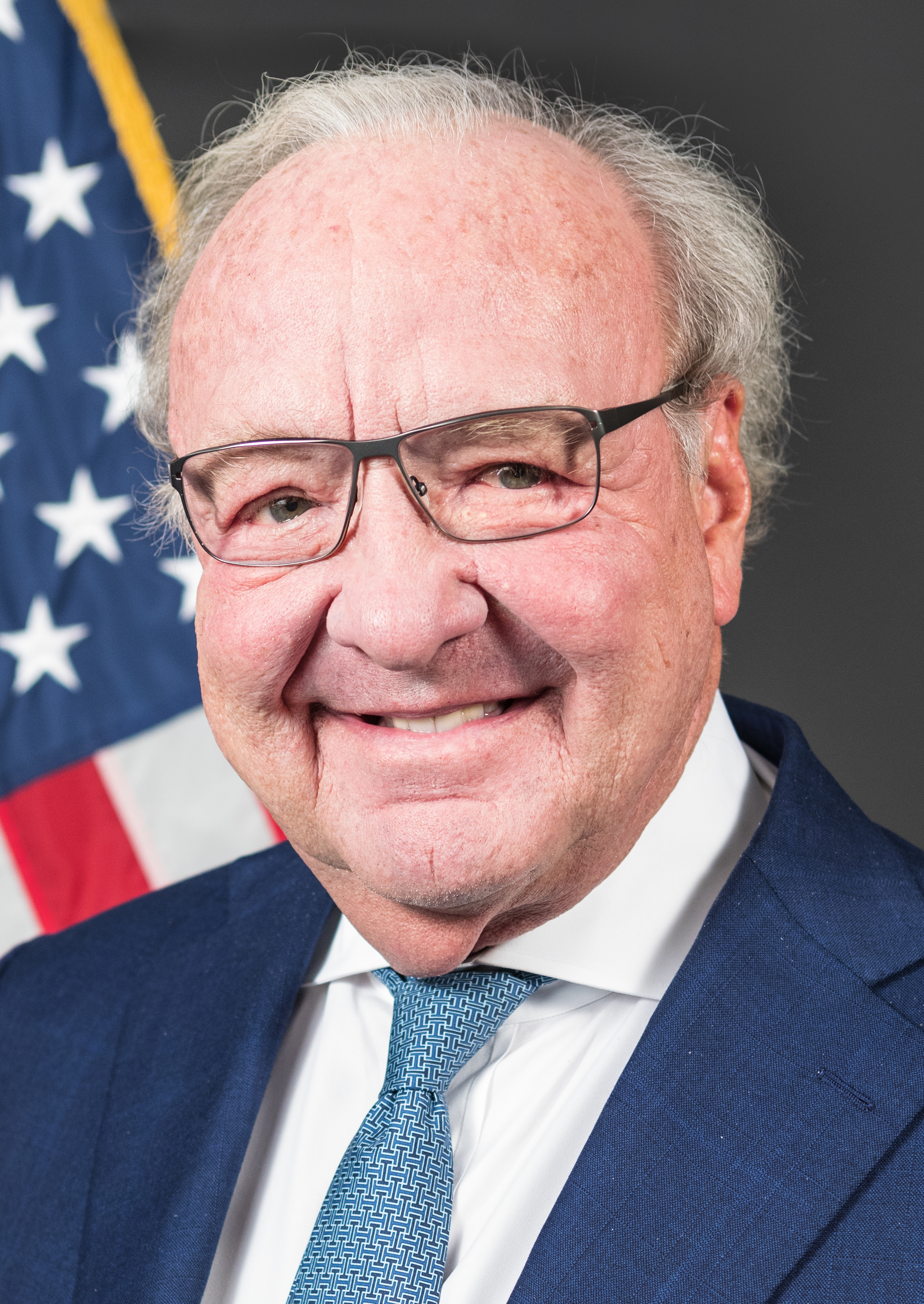
Tom Hicks in 2018

In August 1997, Dallas-based investment firm Hicks, Muse, Tate & Furst (Hicks, Muse) announced plans to acquire LIN Television for $1.7 billion. The chief executive of Hicks, Muse was Tom Hicks, who also personally owned the Dallas Stars hockey team. Two months later, LIN received a surprise higher offer from Raycom Media; Hicks, Muse raised its offer to $1.9 billion, which was accepted. The raised offer was possible because NBC had agreed to join Hicks, Muse in a joint venture, majority-owned by NBC, that would own KXAS-TV and KNSD in San Diego. This transaction was shortly followed in January 1998 with a deal for Hicks to buy the Rangers, which was unanimously approved by other Major League Baseball owners in June.

Hicks, Muse opted to combine LIN with Chancellor Media, an owner of radio stations also controlled by the firm, in a deal announced in July 1998. In a simultaneous transaction announced the same day, LIN agreed to contribute its agreement to operate KXTX-TV to a new company to be owned by Hicks, Muse principals; the firm would own the Rangers, the Stars, and partial interests in the Ballpark in Arlington and the to-be-built American Airlines Center. It also held an option to acquire KXTX from CBN, which still owned the station, for a nominal sum. The new company was primarily controlled by Hicks, who kept his sports ventures separate from the activities of Hicks, Muse.

Our choice was to do our own independent network and to compete with Fox or to join with Fox as we have done here. It was purely a trade-off of money.

— Tom Hicks, upon selling cable rights to the Stars and Rangers to Fox Sports Southwest

Under what became known as Southwest Sports Group, KXTX was envisioned as the centerpiece in a broadcasting and cable venture that included a planned regional sports network to carry the Rangers, Stars, and other programming. Hicks hoped to find a established media partner, such as Fox Sports, ESPN, or CNN, to aid in programming and distribution of the Southwest Sports service. As early as February 1998, some advertising buyers had noted to Mediaweek that KXTX could have a strategic advantage over a cable-only service because cable penetration in the market was well below the national average. Ahead of the 1999–2000 NHL season, Hicks moved the over-the-air rights for the Stars from KDFI to KXTX, offering 30 games.

However, within a year, Southwest Sports Group instead decided to pivot. In September 1999, Hicks signed a $300 million deal with Fox Sports Southwest—the former Prime Sports—granting it cable rights for the Rangers and Stars for the next 15 years, concluding it made no sense to compete with the existing Fox-owned regional sports network. With this agreement, Southwest Sports Group was left to ponder the future of its other media holdings—SSG Productions, the former LIN Productions, and KXTX-TV. After the FCC legalized duopolies—single ownership of two stations in a TV market—the value of the station rose, and Southwest Sports Group began fielding offers before entering exclusive negotiations with a single bidder. In addition, it sold the over-the-air broadcast rights for the Rangers and Stars to Fox Sports Net, which would air the games on Fox-owned KDFW-TV and KDFI.

=== Aborted sale to Pappas Telecasting ===
In July 2000, Southwest Sports Group announced it would sell KXTX-TV to California-based Pappas Telecasting Companies for $85.55 million. The deal also included Southwest Sports paying $1 million to acquire the station outright from CBN. The transaction also brought to light some of the conditions under which CBN had outsourced station operations since 1994, notably that the station had to air The 700 Club at 8 a.m. daily and that it had to be programmed in English until May 31, 2001. Robertson had founded the Christian Coalition of America, which advocated that English should be the official language of the United States.

The English-language clause was particularly pertinent given Pappas's programming plans for channel 39. The station would broadcast a new network, Azteca América, being formed as a joint venture of Pappas and TV Azteca of Mexico. The KXTX studios on Harry Hines Boulevard would become Azteca América's network operations center; the network was planned to debut in June 2001. Work had progressed far enough that the Azteca América logo was emblazoned on a satellite dish at the site.

Even though the FCC approved the deal in November 2000, Pappas's plans to launch Azteca América ran into a series of difficulties, primarily economic. Pappas also had an unfinished deal to acquire KDBC-TV in El Paso, which lingered, and walked away from a transaction to acquire KZTV in Corpus Christi and KVTV in Laredo. These stations were all CBS affiliates; in El Paso, national advertisers shied away from KDBC because they were not sure if it was going to switch from English to Spanish, while KZTV had a CBS affiliation agreement that extended until 2007, impeding any change in network. The network also suffered in its station acquisition strategy. Rival Univision purchased USA Broadcasting, taking with it major-market stations that could have aided its national reach; meanwhile, Azteca América walked away from a deal to buy WSAH in the New York City market. This reduced coverage caused analysts to be skeptical of the network's acceptance among national advertisers. Additionally, economic conditions soured, jeopardizing the high-yield debt market where the network was to have raised $300 million.

In late May 2001, the Pappas acquisition fell through, and Hicks began looking for another buyer.

== As a Telemundo station ==
First logo as a Telemundo station, used from 2002 to 2012

In the wake of the Pappas–Azteca América deal falling through, Telemundo, another Spanish-language TV network, entered into discussions with Hicks; on June 27, 2001, Southwest Sports Group announced it would sell KXTX-TV to Telemundo for $65 million. With the deal, Telemundo would have a total of 10 owned-and-operated stations, including in the eight largest Hispanic television markets in the country. Telemundo's existing affiliate in the Metroplex was KFWD (channel 52), a Fort Worth–licensed, Irving-based station that had signed on with Telemundo programming in 1988.

More than three months later, on October 11, NBC purchased Telemundo from a consortium of Sony Pictures Entertainment, Liberty Media, and private equity firms BV Capital, Bastion Capital and Council Tree Communications for $2.68 billion, including the existing sale agreement for KXTX in the transaction. On January 1, 2002, KXTX began broadcasting Telemundo programming; KFWD became an English-language independent station. KXTX debuted local Spanish-language newscasts at 5 and 10 p.m. in April 2002. It continued to operate from Dallas until March 2006, when it moved in with KXAS-TV in its studios in Fort Worth.

NBC's parent company, NBCUniversal, announced a restructuring of its Telemundo local newscasts in the Southwest in 2006. The plan centered on KXTX by consolidating the Telemundo newscasts in Dallas–Fort Worth, Houston, San Antonio, Phoenix, Las Vegas, and San Jose into one news program presented from Fort Worth. The hubbing of local news production attracted criticism from the National Association of Hispanic Journalists, including formal statements against NBCUniversal decrying the move. The centralized news plan began to unwind in late 2009. In February 2010, KXTX began airing separate 5 and 10 p.m. local newscasts again. In 2011, KXTX added a monthly public affairs program; shortly after, it began producing weekend evening newscasts.

=== New studios in Fort Worth and news expansion ===
In June 2012, NBCUniversal announced plans to construct a new 75,000-square-foot (6,968 m^{2}) facility in Fort Worth, located at the CentrePort Business Park on the former site of Amon Carter Field, to house KXAS, KXTX, and NBCUniversal's other local operations, including the Dallas news bureau operated by NBC News. Construction of the facility began that month and was completed in September 2013, with station operations migrating in phases over the course of October. The facility incorporates three control rooms and a combined media asset management center and newsroom production suite for managing and editing content.

In the years after moving into the new facility, KXTX expanded local news in line with the other Telemundo-owned stations. On September 18, 2014, Telemundo announced that it would expand its early-evening newscast to one hour, with the addition of a half-hour program at 4:30 p.m., as part of a groupwide news expansion across Telemundo's owned-and-operated stations. A 4 p.m. half-hour was added in 2016, again as part of a national expansion in the group; similarly, a midday newscast was introduced in January 2018 in Dallas–Fort Worth and nine other cities.

Telemundo stations in Texas began airing a statewide morning newscast, Noticias Telemundo Texas, on September 26, 2022. The program was presented from Fort Worth. As part of a partnership with Gray Television, five of Gray's Telemundo affiliates—in Amarillo, Lubbock, Tyler, Waco, and Wichita Falls—simulcast KXTX's 4 p.m. local news as a lead-in to locally produced newscasts at 5 p.m. On November 1, 2024, Noticias Telemundo Texas was discontinued in favor of a digital 7 a.m. newscast. However, news briefs were produced live starting at 6 a.m. to give updates about local news, weather and traffic.

== Technical information ==
KXTX-TV's transmitter is located in Cedar Hill, Texas. Its signal is multiplexed:

Subchannels of KXTX-TV
Subchannel	Res.	Short name	Programming
39.1	1080i	KXTX-DT	Telemundo
39.2	480i	Exitos	TeleXitos
5.4	480i	Oxygen	Oxygen

KXTX began transmitting a digital television signal on UHF channel 40 on August 1, 2002. KXTX-TV shut down its analog signal, over UHF channel 39, at 10:35 p.m. on June 12, 2009, as part of the federally mandated transition from analog to digital television. The station continued to transmit its digital signal on channel 40 until June 21, 2019, when it moved to channel 36 as a result of the 2016 United States wireless spectrum auction.
