= KDFI =

Television station in Dallas

- Dallas–Fort Worth, Texas; United States
- City: Dallas, Texas
- Channels: Digital: 27 (UHF); Virtual: 27
- Branding: Fox 4 Plus

Programming
- Affiliations: 27.1: Independent with MyNetworkTV / Fox (alternate); 27.4: Fox in SD; for others, see § Subchannels

Ownership
- Owner: Fox Television Stations; (NW Communications of Texas, Inc.)
- Sister stations: KDFW

History
- First air date: January 26, 1981
- Former call signs: KTWS-TV (1981–1984); KDFI-TV (1984–2000)
- Former channel numbers: Analog: 27 (UHF, 1981–2009); Digital: 36 (UHF, 2001–2019)
- Former affiliations: Independent (1981–2006); Preview (STV, 1981–1982); VEU (secondary, 1982–1984); FoxBox/4KidsTV (secondary, 2002-2008)

Technical information
- Licensing authority: FCC
- Facility ID: 17037
- ERP: 1,000 kW
- HAAT: 519 m (1,703 ft)
- Transmitter coordinates: 32°35′7.2″N 96°58′42.1″W
- Translator(s): KDFW 4.2 Dallas

Links
- Public license information: Public file; LMS
- Website: www.fox4news.com/more-27

KDFI (channel 27), branded as Fox 4 Plus, is a television station licensed to Dallas, Texas, United States, serving the Dallas–Fort Worth metroplex. It is programmed primarily as an independent station, but maintains a secondary affiliation with MyNetworkTV. KDFI is owned by Fox Television Stations alongside KDFW (channel 4) and the two stations share studios on North Griffin Street in downtown Dallas; KDFI's transmitter is located in Cedar Hill, Texas.

Channel 27 began broadcasting in January 1981 as KTWS-TV. It was built by Liberty STV, a subsidiary of Oregon-based Liberty Television, and was primarily created to serve as a conduit for over-the-air subscription television programming. It was the third such station to sign on within four months in the Metroplex. The station's subscription programs originally came from Preview, a division of American Television & Communications. The Dallas–Fort Worth market was home to intense competition in subscription TV, as three different companies operated over a period lasting nearly two years. The market experienced a shake-out that began in September 1982, when VEU, a competing service owned by Golden West Broadcasters, acquired Preview's Metroplex operations. VEU then moved its programming from KNBN to KTWS-TV. By the end of April 1983, VEU was the last subscription system standing.

Liberty Television was purchased by Tele-Communications Inc. (TCI), a major owner of cable systems, in 1983. TCI determined that it could not keep Liberty's television stations, including KTWS-TV, because of rules that barred cross-ownership of broadcast stations and cable systems in the same areas. It sold KTWS-TV to a consortium known as Dallas Media Investors. With VEU continuing to lose subscribers, the station changed its call letters to KDFI-TV in August 1984 and became a full-time commercial independent on October 1 of that year. The station ran on a lean basis, avoiding the more expensive program purchases that characterized its competitors, but held its own against stations like KTXA and KDAF in the ratings. Dallas Media Investors reorganized in bankruptcy in the early 1990s to settle a lawsuit with Paramount Pictures and a dispute among stockholders. In 1994, Argyle Television, then-owner of KDFW-TV, took over KDFI-TV's programming under a local marketing agreement; KDFW and KDFI became co-owned under Fox in 1999 when the Federal Communications Commission permitted duopolies.

In the years following KDFW's takeover of KDFI, channel 27 increased its profile with higher-quality entertainment programming and rights to telecast various DFW-area sports teams, most notably the Texas Rangers and Dallas Stars. These teams moved their limited over-the-air schedules off KDFI at the end of the 2000s.

== History ==
Channel 27 was assigned to Dallas in 1965 to help resolve competing applications that had been filed for channel 29. That year, Maxwell Electronics Corporation applied for a new television station on channel 29 in Dallas, which placed it into comparative hearing with two other applicants: Overmyer Communications and Grandview Broadcasting Company. Grandview dropped out, and in January 1967, Maxwell amended its application to specify channel 33 instead of 29. The proposed change in channels was part of a plan by Overmyer to give both applicants stations by moving the channel 27 allocation from Tyler, Texas, thus replacing 29 with 27 and 33. This plan, which also eliminated a short-spacing issue, was accepted by the Federal Communications Commission (FCC) on December 15, 1966.

Overmyer Communications dropped out in November 1967 amid an investigation into the businesses of its owner, Daniel H. Overmyer. The next month, Gordon McLendon, owner of KLIF (1190 AM) and KNUS (98.7 FM), obtained the construction permit. However, by 1969, McLendon had abandoned the plans, and the construction permit had been canceled.

=== KTWS-TV: The subscription years ===
On November 15, 1973, Liberty STV applied for a construction permit for channel 27. Liberty STV was a subsidiary of Liberty Television, which owned cable TV systems as well as television stations in Oregon. Also seeking the channel was United Television Broadcasting Corporation, a related company to United Cable. United, though, withdrew its application in 1976.

The FCC granted Liberty's construction permit application on February 11, 1980. The permit grant came in the middle of revived activity around three previously dormant ultra high frequency (UHF) TV channels in the Metroplex, all seeking hybrid stations airing partly commercial and partly subscription television (STV) programming. The new station would share a tower with the other two: KTXA (channel 21) and KNBN (channel 33). Liberty Television set up shop on Regal Row in Dallas and signed a deal with Preview, a division of American Television and Communications, to provide STV service to paying subscribers on evenings as well as weekend afternoons. It announced a lineup of syndicated game shows, movies, children's shows, and classic reruns for its commercial broadcast schedule. By this time, Liberty Television also owned four TV stations in Wisconsin, with which KTWS-TV was placed in Liberty's corporate structure.

KTWS-TV made its first broadcast on January 26, 1981, initially with just Preview programming. Preview charged subscribers a $50 installation fee and $20 a month for continued service, programming sports and feature films; its management believed it would take three to five years for cable, a major competitor to STV, to arrive in the city of Dallas. Later that year, the station hired Bob Gooding, an 18-year veteran of WFAA-TV (channel 8), to anchor news briefs.

All three stations contributed to an intense STV marketplace; KTXA aired ON TV, KTWS-TV aired Preview, and KNBN aired VEU, which was owned by Golden West Broadcasters. Anthony Cassara, the market manager for VEU, called the Metroplex STV competition "total insanity" in an interview with Broadcasting published in August 1982 and said the market only could support one profitable system. In adopting aggressive discounting, the services accumulated many non-paying subscribers, with VEU's disconnect rate (of subscribers canceling service) running as high as 8% a month. The first step in consolidation took place on September 1, 1982, when VEU announced it would acquire Preview's customer base and move its programming from KNBN to KTWS-TV by year's end. Preview subscribers began receiving VEU programming on September 12. In the deal, VEU acquired Preview's decoder boxes and added Preview's 25,000 local subscribers to its 42,000. With the consolidation would come an expansion of weekend STV programming, rising to 18 hours a day on Saturdays and Sundays. ON TV remained out of the fray; it was the only one of the three services showing growth in subscribers. One observer told Jerry Coffey of the Fort Worth Star-Telegram that one reason VEU succeeded where Preview flagged was a stronger lineup of late-night adult movies. Liberty was a more accepting station of adult STV programming than KNBN, which once vetoed a showing of the movie Beneath the Valley of the Ultra-Vixens; Ed Bark of The Dallas Morning News called KTWS-TV "a compliant caretaker station". It cost Golden West $1.5 million to convert the existing VEU subscribers to receive channel 27 instead of 33; further, Golden West had shuttered its only other STV operation, on KAUT-TV in Oklahoma City, and began shipping its decoder boxes south to Dallas.

Meanwhile, the station continued to experiment with its commercial lineup. The station aired two Saturday morning shows produced by kids, Kids' View and Kids' Zone; the former was anchored by a 13-year-old. In January 1983, the station began airing the syndicated Financial News Network in daytime hours. By September 1983, the Star-Telegram was calling the station's daytime lineup "peculiar".

In April 1983, IASTV, an affiliate of the Independent American Group, acquired VEU from Golden West Broadcasters. The move marked the end of the company's foray into subscription television. On April 30, ON TV bowed out of the market, leaving VEU alone; one reason was that KTXA's owner, Milton Grant, had been unwilling to give more time to the service, and the station began objecting to the airing of adult movies in the conservative Metroplex market.

Meanwhile, in February 1983, Liberty Television was purchased by cable system operator Tele-Communications Inc. (TCI) for $182 million. The television stations would have been TCI's first. However, TCI ran into issues with overlap between cable systems and television holdings, then barred by the FCC. When it closed on the transaction in September 1983, it spun off the Liberty TV station in Eugene, Oregon, and placed the Texas and Wisconsin stations into a trust to be sold within a year.

=== KDFI-TV: The Dallas Media Investors years ===
By that time, Liberty had reached an agreement in principle with Dallas Media Investors Corporation to acquire the station. Dallas Media Investors was led by James R. Grant, a financial consultant, and funded by Warburg Pincus Capital Partners. The group planned to honor the existing contract with VEU, which ran until either 1994 or 1996, while restructuring the station's ad-supported programming. The station sold for $15 million. Dallas Media Investors then lured John McKay, the general manager of local CBS affiliate KDFW-TV, to become general manager of KTWS-TV and partner in the corporation. VEU petitioned the FCC to deny the sale to Dallas Media Investors, but the commission approved the transaction on June 22, 1984, and the new owners took control five days later.

On August 16, 1984, KTWS-TV changed its call sign to KDFI-TV. Days later, VEU announced that it would leave the air on September 30, bringing to an end the era of subscription television in Dallas–Fort Worth and making way for a full-time commercial programming schedule on channel 27. McKay hoped advertisers and viewers would take the relaunched station seriously, given its reputation of vanishing at night when it operated in subscription mode. Among the new programs on the channel 27 lineup were Southland Conference, North Texas State University, and University of Texas at Arlington football; a heavy diet of Western movies, with 28 in the first three days; and short local segments hosted by former KDFW-TV personality Jocelyn White. In 1985, the station became the alternate outlet for network programs from NBC that KXAS-TV preempted. It also aired a weekly series of hosted B-movies, The Film Vault, and attempted a weekend magazine-type program featuring White, which only aired for three months.

If Dallas Media Investors had intended to make a quick flip of channel 27, as some analysts believed, this never materialized. The owners put the station on the market for two months in 1985, when analysts believed it could go for twice the price the firm had paid, but opted not to sell. Softness in the regional economy and the advertising market for independent stations, as well as a crowded market, changed the picture. McKay told Michael Weiss of The Dallas Morning News, "[T]he competition is very difficult ... The day of buying a property, popping a number and selling are over." Without the backing of a large TV station group, the station worked its way into the independent station conversation in the market with cheaper, sometimes lowbrow programming that sometimes attracted better ratings than its more expensive rivals. In February 1987, KDFI beat KDAF and KXTX-TV in the ratings and tied KTXA; the station also improved its finances.

However, what little operating profit KDFI-TV generated was dwarfed by interest payments on its debt. In 1991, Paramount Pictures sued KDFI-TV over failing to pay for reruns of Mork & Mindy, which McKay believed was connected to its acquisition later that year of KTXA. Paramount won in court; the station then filed for bankruptcy reorganization in order to be fairer to other creditors. The proceeding was dominated by disputes between secured creditors, primarily Warburg Pincus, and the dozens of unsecured creditors; when the creditors resolved their differences in July 1993, they ended an effort by businessman Carl Westcott to buy the station. Channel 27's lineup was highlighted by syndicated talk shows; the station branded itself The Talk of Texas and aired The Jerry Springer Show, The Sally Jessy Raphael Show, and Geraldo in prime time.

=== Under KDFW-TV management ===
Studio and office facilities of KDFW and KDFI on North Griffin Street in downtown Dallas

On May 20, 1994, Argyle Television—then-owner of KDFW-TV—took over management responsibilities for KDFI, including programming and advertising sales, under a local marketing agreement (LMA) with Dallas Media Investors. This was the first such agreement in the Dallas–Fort Worth market, or any top-10 media market, and grew out of a previous sublicensing arrangement for reruns of Murphy Brown and Taxi that were not being used by KDFW. The deal was announced days before Argyle agreed to sell KDFW-TV and other stations to New World Communications, which in turn struck a deal to switch KDFW-TV and 11 other stations to the Fox network.

The affiliation shuffle that followed KDFW's switch to Fox caused KTVT (channel 11), an independent station which held multiple sports team rights, to become the CBS affiliate. KDFW–KDFI began aggressively pursuing sports rights. With KTVT now airing network programming in the evenings, the Dallas Mavericks of the NBA moved their games to KDFI in the 1995–96 season; channel 27 aired 30 games, with the team handling all production. The Dallas Stars of the National Hockey League, another team affected by KTVT's new CBS affiliation, moved their games to KDFI that same year. The Mavericks deal lasted one season, as the Mavericks moved to KXTX-TV the following season; the Stars continued with KDFW and KDFI. While the stations had pursued the rights to Texas Rangers baseball in 1995, the team signed with KXTX and KXAS-TV, which at the time was programming channel 39 under an LMA. In 1995, during the murder trial of O. J. Simpson, KDFI presented a nightly wrap-up show featuring highlights of the day's activity.

News Corporation acquired New World Communications outright for $2.8 billion in a deal announced in July 1996 and completed in January 1997. In September 1997, KDFI acquired the local rights to the Fox Kids programming block, which remained with KDAF following Fox's sale of that station to Renaissance Broadcasting; like other New World stations affected by the affiliation agreement, KDFW declined to carry the Fox Kids weekday and Saturday blocks upon joining Fox, choosing instead to air news and talk programming. In December 1999, one month after the FCC began permitting television station duopolies, Fox Television Stations purchased KDFI from Dallas Media Investors for $6.2 million, creating a legal duopoly with KDFW. The sale received FCC approval on February 18, 2000. The acquisition resulted in the KDFW–KDFI combination becoming the first duopoly owned by Fox, predating the group's acquisition of Chris-Craft/United Television's UPN-affiliated stations that August. At that time, KDFW employed 245 people, while KDFI employed 18.

The acquisition by Fox also brought KDFI under the same corporate umbrella as Fox Sports Net and its subsidiary Fox Sports Southwest, a cable regional sports network serving Texas. In 2000, the Texas Rangers and Dallas Stars—then commonly owned by Tom Hicks—sold their broadcast TV rights to Fox in a ten-year, $250 million deal that moved Rangers games to KDFW and KDFI. This followed Fox Sports Net acquiring cable rights to the two teams in a fifteen-year, $250 million pact.

=== MyNetworkTV affiliation ===
On January 24, 2006, UPN and The WB announced their merger into The CW. Coinciding with the merger, the combined network announced that 16 stations owned by Tribune Broadcasting and 13 stations owned by CBS Corporation would be affiliated with the network upon launch. Skipped over were all of Fox's UPN affiliates, many of which competed with the Tribune and CBS stations selected for the new network. A month later, News Corporation announced the creation of MyNetworkTV, its own secondary network to serve its own outgoing UPN stations as well as those that had not been selected for The CW. It also included KDFI as a MyNetworkTV affiliate. By May, the station had changed its branding to "My27".

KDFI continued to air sports telecasts after the MyNetworkTV switch. In 2007, the station simulcast two Dallas Cowboys appearances on Thursday Night Football from NFL Network; the first attracted 46 percent of all households using a television that night. At the end of the ten-year contracts to carry Rangers and Stars games, the teams opted not to renew their deals with KDFI and instead moved their games to KTXA beginning in 2010. In the case of the Rangers, the team was reportedly upset with Fox allocating just 24 games to KDFI and 133 to Fox Sports Southwest in the 2009 season, even though the replacement pact with KTXA consisted of a 25-game package. Stars games would return in 2025 as part of an agreement with the Stars and Victory+ to locally simulcast two games on KDFI and two more on KDFW. Also in 2025, KDFI announced an agreement to air weekly rebroadcasts of FC Dallas matches on Tuesday nights, under the banner FC Dallas Rewind.

In February 2022, KDFI began simulcasting programming from Fox Weather. This programming aired from 10 to 11 a.m. on weekdays and from 5 to 7 a.m. on Saturdays on the main channel. The station reairs KDFW's 5 to 6:30 p.m. news block from 7 to 8:30 p.m. The station rebranded as Fox 4 Plus on June 1, 2026, to better advertise the station's connection with KDFW and role as an alternate channel for local programming.

KDFI is to move with KDFW to new studios in the Las Colinas section of Irving. Construction is expected to last from 2025 to 2027.

== Technical information ==
=== Subchannels ===
KDFI's transmitter is located in Cedar Hill, Texas. The station's signal is multiplexed:

Subchannels of KDFI
Subchannel	Res.	Short name	Programming
27.1	720p	KDFI-DT	Main KDFI programming
27.2	480i	Movies!	Movies!
27.3	480i	BUZZR	Buzzr
27.4	480i	KDFI-D4	Fox (KDFW) in SD
27.5	480i	HSN	QVC2
27.6	480i	FOX WX	Fox Weather

Simulcast of subchannels of another station

=== Analog-to-digital conversion ===
KDFI began broadcasting a digital signal, initially at low power, on May 1, 2002. KDFI shut down its analog signal on June 12, 2009, as part of the federally mandated transition from analog to digital television. The station's digital signal remained on its pre-transition UHF channel 36, using virtual channel 27. The station was repacked to channel 27 on June 18, 2019, as a result of the 2016 United States wireless spectrum auction.
