= VEU =

American subscription television service

Video Entertainment Unlimited (VEU)
- Country: United States
- Broadcast area: Nationwide (available in select areas)
- Headquarters: Los Angeles, California

Programming
- Language: English

Ownership
- Owner: Golden West Subscription Television, Inc. (Golden West Broadcasters) (1980–1983); IASTV (1983–1984)

History
- Launched: April 1, 1980; 46 years ago
- Closed: September 30, 1984; 42 years ago
- Former names: Golden West Entertainment Network (April–June 1980)

Video Entertainment Unlimited (VEU) (also referred to as VEU Subscription TV) was an American subscription television service that was owned by the Golden West Subscription Television, Inc. subsidiary of Golden West Broadcasters, which operated from May 1, 1980, until September 30, 1984. VEU aired a broad mix of feature films (including mainstream Hollywood blockbusters, lesser-known mainstream films, and softcore pornography) as well as sports events and specials.

Operating initially on two microwave systems and, later, over the signals of fledgling independent stations in select markets throughout the United States, VEU was similar in model and format to other subscription television (STV) services that were available to prospective subscribers by way of scrambled microwave and UHF broadcast signals. The service was available as either a standalone offering for those that did not have access to cable television-originated premium services, or as an additional viewing alternative thereto.

== History ==
=== Launch ===
The first STV services to be launched by Golden West Subscription Television were microwave systems operating in Memphis, Tennessee, and Omaha, Nebraska, which launched on April 1 and May 1, 1980, respectively, under the Golden West Entertainment Network brand; Golden West rebranded the Memphis service as VEU on June 15. Golden West had been providing Showtime to subscribers in Memphis since November 15, 1979, as the "Gold Channel".

VEU commenced broadcast operations in Oklahoma City, Oklahoma, on October 15, 1980, transmitting over the signal of KAUT (channel 43), a new station built by Golden West. KAUT aired a mixed format of rolling news and syndicated programming during weekday daytime periods and VEU subscription programming at night; the VEU service launched ahead of KAUT's commercial programming, which debuted November 3.

VEU expanded to the Dallas–Fort Worth metroplex, where it began to broadcast over new station KNBN-TV (channel 33) on November 1, 1980. It then shed the two microwave systems in Omaha and Memphis; these operations were sold to Entertainment Systems, Inc., which rebranded them as LimeLight, a service which collapsed in February 1982.

In the two broadcast markets—Oklahoma City and Dallas—the service cost between $19.95 and $22.50 per month depending on the market (equivalent to between $77.95 and $87.92 in 2025 adjusted for inflation), in addition to one-time fees of $49.95 for installation (equivalent to $195.18 today) and $34.99 (equivalent to $136.72 today) in deposit fees. In order to unscramble the VEU signal and receive its programming, prospective subscribers were required to purchase a Zenith-manufactured decoder box, which were designed to be controlled from the participating station's studio facility to prevent pirating of the VEU signal by anyone receiving the service without a subscription, allowing station engineers to remotely encrypt the illegally unscrambled decoders where detected.

=== Expansion attempts ===
Golden West Broadcasters periodically floated the expansion of VEU's subscription television service to other markets; however, these plans would never come to fruition. Another of Golden West's subscription television subsidiaries, Golden West STV of Providence, planned to start up a subscription television operation over fledgling independent station WSTG (channel 64) in Providence, Rhode Island; however, that service ultimately would never launch. Additionally, Chicago was listed on a handful of occasions as a planned expansion target. Chicago had a crowded subscription television market, with three STV services: ON TV, Spectrum, and Sportsvision. In May 1980, Golden West announced it would acquire franchises for Chicago, Dallas, Providence, and San Francisco (KTSF-TV) from Subscription Television of America, though this never took place.

One prospective VEU outlet ended up as one of the most visible signs of the service, even though it never actually hosted a VEU operation, because of its call letters. Even though Golden West Broadcasters had incorporated an STV subsidiary under the name "Golden West STV of Atlanta", WVEU, an upstart UHF television station founded by locally based BCG Communications that signed on the air on August 22, 1981, chose instead to begin its subscription television operations on November 23 of that year with the launch of "Superstar TV", which shared some ownership with the Super TV subscription service in the Washington, D.C., and Baltimore markets. Superstar, which provided the vast majority of the programming content broadcast over WVEU (transmitting daily from 1:00 p.m. until its 2:00 a.m. sign-off) as the station worked out interference issues with two-way radio transmissions, ceased operations the morning of July 23, 1983, while its operator, Subscription Television of Greater Atlanta Inc., was in the midst of bankruptcy proceedings.

=== Oklahoma City closure and Dallas merger ===
In Oklahoma City, cable companies including Cox Cable and Pan Oklahoma Communications wired the city faster than had been expected; as a result of increased competition from cable, a microwave distribution service offering HBO and the rise of VCRs, VEU closed its Oklahoma City operation on October 17, 1982. KAUT expanded its conventional schedule into prime time with classic television series and select first-run syndicated programs. It was among the first closures of a subscription television service anywhere.

In the meantime, VEU grew in Dallas–Fort Worth. In September 1982, Golden West STV of Dallas purchased the Metroplex-area operations of competing subscription service Preview from Time, Inc.'s cable television subsidiary, American Television and Communications (ATC). Following a 90-day simulcasting period, VEU moved its programming exclusively to the former Preview station, KTWS-TV (channel 27), in December 1982; on channel 27, more air time was available for subscription television. As a result, KNBN-TV expanded its commercial broadcast day with more programs from the Spanish International Network. The merger united Preview's 25,000 area subscribers with VEU's 42,000; however, VEU had only 45,000 subscribers by April 1983.

=== The end in Dallas ===
In the early 1980s, Golden West Broadcasters began to divest its television assets. IASTV, a group of Dallas-area investors associated with the Independent American Group, acquired VEU in April 1983.

VEU, which became the sole survivor of the three operating STV services in Dallas–Fort Worth when ON TV closed there in May 1983, would see its fortunes reverse in 1984 as cable television grew in the Metroplex. That year, Liberty Television, Inc., of Eugene, Oregon, which had built and signed on KTWS-TV in 1981, sold it to a group headed by Jack McKay, former general manager of KDFW. Even though VEU had a contract to air over the station until 1996, McKay desired to program the station full-time as a commercial outlet. VEU petitioned against the sale, but the Federal Communications Commission denied the petition in June. Sensing that the writing was on the wall, VEU and McKay agreed to a termination of the contract, clearing the way for McKay to transform channel 27 into a full-time commercial independent as KDFI after VEU's last night of programming on September 30, 1984.

== Programming ==
Like most over-the-air subscription television services, VEU operated on a part-time basis throughout its entire existence, partly because of its distribution via commercial independent stations; it transmitted programming Monday through Fridays from 7:00 p.m. to 2:00 a.m. and Saturdays and Sundays from 12:00 p.m. to 2:00 a.m. The service's feature film schedule was structured so that no affiliate could "run a movie to death," limiting repeat airings of any individual movie title to only four or five times in a given month. For an additional monthly fee, VEU also offered Night VEU, an adult-oriented late night programming block that, depending on the evening's film schedule, aired nightly from 11:00 p.m. until 1:00 a.m. local time or later (inside safe harbor hours designated by the FCC), featuring softcore pornographic films.

The Oklahoma City and Dallas VEU stations each also offered professional sporting events. In both Dallas and Oklahoma City, VEU carried regular-season NBA games of the Dallas Mavericks from 1980 to 1983, when it dropped them after becoming the only surviving STV service in the Dallas market. The service also broadcast 20 Texas Rangers games in the 1982 season, though it lost baseball to a new cable channel, Home Sports Entertainment, the next year. In Oklahoma City, VEU offered college football and basketball games featuring participating Big Eight Conference universities (particularly involving the Oklahoma Sooners and Oklahoma State Cowboys, the latter of which had their wrestling matches also carried by VEU locally).
