= KTXA =

Television station in Fort Worth, Texas

- Fort Worth–Dallas, Texas; United States
- City: Fort Worth, Texas
- Channels: Digital: 18 (UHF); Virtual: 21
- Branding: TXA 21

Programming
- Affiliations: 21.1: Independent; for others, see § Technical information and subchannels

Ownership
- Owner: CBS Television Stations; (Television Station KTXA Inc.)
- Sister stations: KTVT

History
- First air date: January 4, 1981
- Former channel numbers: Analog: 21 (UHF, 1981–2009); Digital: 18 (UHF, 2000–2009; 2009–2011), 19 (UHF, 2009), (Note: Moved to RF channel 19 in June 2009 but reverted to channel 18 that August; see § Analog-to-digital conversion.) 29 (UHF, 2011–2019)
- Former affiliations: ON TV (1981–1983); UPN (1995–2006)
- Call sign meaning: Texas Arlington

Technical information
- Licensing authority: FCC
- Facility ID: 51517
- ERP: 1,000 kW
- HAAT: 533.7 m (1,751 ft)
- Transmitter coordinates: 32°32′36″N 96°57′33″W

Links
- Public license information: Public file; LMS
- Website: www.cbsnews.com/texas/

KTXA (channel 21), branded as TXA 21, is an independent television station licensed to Fort Worth, Texas, United States, serving the Dallas–Fort Worth metroplex. It is owned by the CBS Television Stations group alongside CBS outlet KTVT (channel 11). The two stations share primary studio facilities on Bridge Street (off I-30), east of downtown Fort Worth, and advertising sales offices at CBS Tower on North Central Expressway in Dallas. KTXA's transmitter is located in Cedar Hill, Texas.

KTXA began broadcasting in January 1981 and was one of three new television stations in the Metroplex in six months. All three broadcast advertiser-supported commercial programming during the day and scrambled subscription television (STV) at night; KTXA's service, from ON TV, was hamstrung by the most intense competition in any STV market in the United States and by a dispute over adult programming, closing after two years. The station found success as an independent in a hot market and was sold twice in rapid succession for large amounts. However, when the independent station trade, advertising market, and regional economy cooled, it was sold again for less than half of its previous value. The Paramount Stations Group acquired KTXA and other stations in two parts between 1989 and 1991, bringing much-needed stability.

KTXA was one of several Paramount-owned stations to be charter outlets for the United Paramount Network (UPN) in 1995 and merged its operations with KTVT in 2001 after a corporate buyout of CBS. When UPN merged into The CW in 2006, KTXA was not selected to affiliate with the network, and KTXA retooled its local programming around prime time news and professional sports coverage.

== Prior history of UHF channel 21 in Fort Worth ==
The UHF channel 21 allocation in the Dallas–Fort Worth market was originally occupied by KFWT, an independent station licensed to Fort Worth that signed on the air on September 14, 1967. Owned by W. C. Windsor's Trinity Broadcasting Company (no relation to the Trinity Broadcasting Network, which was formed in 1973) alongside KFWT-FM 102.1, the station was the first of three new UHF independents in six months in the Metroplex. Within two years, however, the station had gone silent for financial reasons. No buyer was ever found, and Trinity declared bankruptcy in March 1970, with the channel 21 equipment repossessed.

== History ==
=== Early years ===
In 1975 and 1976, two groups, both calling themselves Channel 21, Inc., filed applications with the Federal Communications Commission (FCC) proposing new television stations to use Fort Worth's channel 21. One application was headed by Robert S. Block, the other by Sidney Shlenker. The Block and Shlenker groups each proposed subscription television (STV) operation. Shlenker's consortium signed a deal with Oak Industries, owner of the ON TV subscription television service, to outfit its proposed STV system in the Metroplex in 1979; on March 31, 1980, the FCC granted a joint settlement by which Block's group was reimbursed for its expenses and dropped out to allow the Shlenker group to be granted the construction permit. This allowed Shlenker to proceed with building the station for a projected November 1980 launch. Construction proceeded more slowly than that; in October, the newly named KTXA purchased an industrial building on Randol Mill Road in nearby Arlington to be occupied by its own operation as well as that of ON TV itself.

KTXA began broadcasting on January 4, 1981, making it the second of three new UHF stations within six months in the Metroplex. (Note: KNBN-TV signed on September 29, 1980. KTWS-TV began broadcasting January 26, 1981.) In addition to sharing a transmitter tower, KTXA had much in common with Dallas-based KTWS-TV (channel 27, now KDFI) and KNBN-TV (channel 33, now KDAF). All three were part-time STV operations, KTWS-TV carrying Preview from American Television and Communications and KNBN-TV providing VEU, owned by Golden West Broadcasters. ON TV did not start broadcasting until the end of February, and KTXA temporarily broadcast an advertiser-supported prime time schedule until that date, in addition to its permanent daytime lineup with movies, live sports, and a heavy dose of syndicated reruns. When ON TV started, it made Dallas–Fort Worth the only market with three over-the-air STV services. Anthony Cassara, who headed VEU, called the market "total insanity".

Oak would like more hours, but we're not going to do it for them. We've probably come on full-force more than any other 'STV station'.

— Milton Grant, general manager of KTXA

ON TV ran third in the Metroplex's subscription television wars. By June 1982, the general zenith of STV nationally, VEU had 42,000 subscribers, Preview 30,000, and ON TV 24,800. Of the eight ON TV-branded services nationally, the Dallas–Fort Worth market was the second-smallest behind the newer franchise serving Salem and Portland, Oregon, and of those owned by Oak, it also had the worst relationship between station and STV franchise. Milton Grant, who had joined the Shlenker group and became intimately involved in operations, built up channel 21 as an aggressive independent in program purchasing. When ON TV launched in the Metroplex, as in other cities and with other STV services, it broadcast late-night adult programming as an add-on to the subscription. In 1982, KTXA—already unwilling to cede more hours to subscription broadcasting—and Oak entered into a dispute over these broadcasts, which the station felt were indecent, and KTXA won in a court fight to uphold its right to cancel ON TV programs to which it objected. ON TV characterized the legal battle as an attempt to prevent the subscription service from continuing with plans to lengthen its programming hours. This was followed in February 1983 by the station pulling such adult films as The Pleasure Palace, New Day in Eden, and Portrait of a Seduction from the schedule. KTXA's development as a station outside of ON TV had also been robust. At KTXA, Grant minted a reputation for being extremely promotion-oriented. In contrast to the other two hybrid startups in the Metroplex that "merely appeared", Ed Bark of The Dallas Morning News wrote that channel 21 had "burst into living rooms like a world-champion encyclopedia salesman", with nearly ubiquitous billboards, high-profile programming, and an emphasis on weekend movies.

As this dispute escalated, the STV industry began to experience a significant reversal nationally due to increased cable television penetration (which included the launch of cable systems in Dallas and Fort Worth) and an ongoing recession. In the Metroplex, VEU had bought Preview's business in September 1982, integrating the two systems over the next several months; further, the loss of the adult programming led to subscriber cancellations. The Dallas–Fort Worth ON TV operation and that in Phoenix, which suffered from similar issues over cable and adult programming, were Oak's first to be put out of business, with ON TV's last day of programming on KTXA on April 30, 1983.

=== An ownership revolving door ===
The Shlenker–Grant group had set up another Texas television station in late 1982, KTXH in Houston, which carried a similar mix of programming (but never broadcast an STV service). Grant's aggressive programming and promotions strategy, plus a favorable climate for independent stations nationally, made the two stations highly profitable and attracted major bidders. Outlet Communications, the broadcasting division of The Outlet Company of Rhode Island, was one of several parties negotiating to buy KTXA and KTXH. However, negotiations fell through, and Grant instead sold the pair to the Gulf Broadcast Group for $158 million in May 1984. The sale was held up for several months at the FCC, which conditioned the purchase on Gulf divesting FM stations in both cities. The sale price was considered unprecedented given the short period of operation of the stations.

Gulf had scarcely owned the stations when it sold its entire stations group for $755 million to Taft Broadcasting in 1985. At the same time Taft acquired a Fort Worth television station, it attracted the attention of an activist investor from the city who increased his stake over the course of 1985 and 1986: Robert Bass, who sought to raise his ownership in the company to 25 percent. Meanwhile, in addition to a worsening regional economy, the independent television market nationally was softening; by this time, many believed that Taft had overpaid for KTXA and that Dallas–Fort Worth had become one of the worst markets for independent stations in the United States. Bill Castleman, KTXA's general manager, believed that the station's programming costs—estimated at $30 million a year—had been deliberately increased as part of a strategy by Grant to pump the station up for a buyer by expanding its programming inventory, a situation which Taft had not anticipated discovering prior to the acquisition.

Taft put its broadcast group up for sale in August 1986 due to agitation by Bass, and while it asked $500 million for five independent stations, the winning bidder—TVX Broadcast Group—only paid $240 million, and Taft estimated its after-tax loss for the sale at $45 to $50 million. (One source believed that the buyers begrudgingly purchased KTXA in order to acquire the other four outlets.) TVX implemented budget cuts, laying off about 15 percent of the staff at the acquisitions, and renegotiated programming costs, though Tim McDonald, the president of TVX, noted that KTXA was among the better operations Taft had sold.

Through the 1980s, KTXA continued to air local sports programming. The NBA's Dallas Mavericks moved to KTXA in 1984 after their previous station, KXAS-TV, came under pressure to stop preempting NBC network shows; channel 21 carried 10 games and WFAA-TV another five. However, the next year, the team signed a three-year deal with KTVT, citing disappointing ratings on KTXA, that station's sale to Taft, and the opportunity to air all of their telecasts on one station. In 1985, KTXA entered into a three-year agreement for football and basketball telecasts of the SMU Mustangs. However, disciplinary problems involving SMU's football team resulted first in a probation that prevented KTXA from airing football games live and then in the temporary cancellation of the football program, at which time KTXA exited the contract, noting that many sponsors had shied away from any association with SMU athletics.

The Taft stations purchase left TVX highly leveraged and highly vulnerable. TVX's bankers, Salomon Brothers, provided the financing for the acquisition and in return held more than 60 percent of the company. The company was to pay Salomon Brothers $200 million on January 1, 1988, and missed the first payment deadline, having been unable to lure investors to its junk bonds even before Black Monday. While TVX recapitalized by the end of 1988, Salomon Brothers reached an agreement in principle in January 1989 for Paramount Pictures to acquire options to purchase the investment firm's majority stake. This deal was replaced in September with an outright purchase of 79 percent of TVX for $110 million.

=== Paramount ownership and UPN affiliation ===
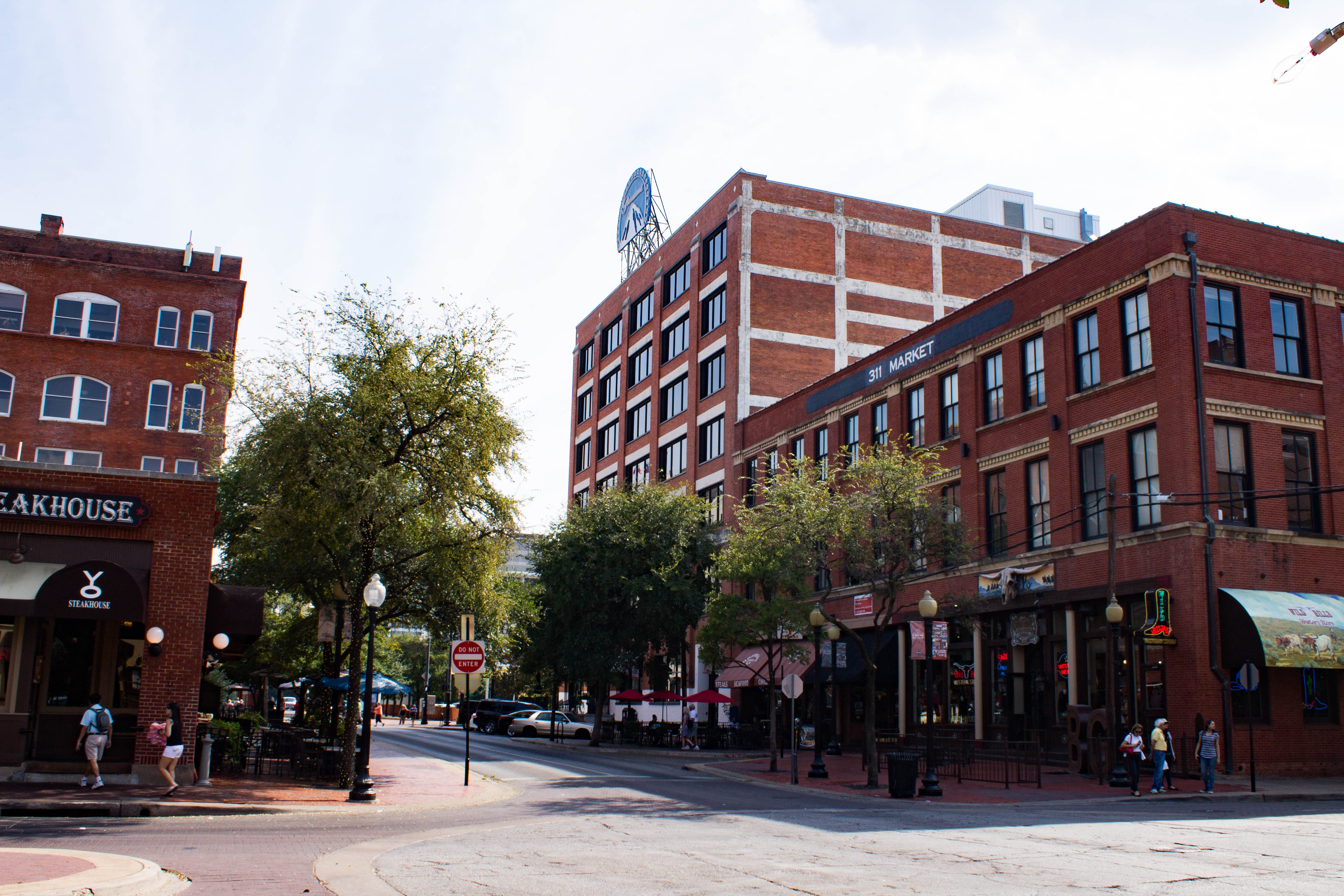
Even though KTXA is no longer located there, a Paramount sign still stands atop a building in Dallas's West End Historic District.

In 1991, Paramount acquired the remainder of TVX. The deal gave Paramount a strategic entrance into the television stations market. Two years later, due to work related to the construction of The Ballpark at Arlington, KTXA moved out of the Arlington studio and to a facility in Dallas's West End Historic District, a former Interstate Trinity warehouse that had been used as the headquarters for Dallas Area Rapid Transit; with its 14-foot (4.3 m) ceilings in the former DART boardroom, it was suitable for television use. The "IT" sign atop the building was replaced with a Paramount sign the next year. Also in 1993, KTXA aired NYPD Blue after WFAA-TV, the ABC affiliate, rejected airing the show on content grounds, and it became the television home of the NHL's Dallas Stars when the team moved to Texas that year, airing a package of 20 road games as part of 50 televised contests between regional sports network HSE, KTVT, and KTXA. The Stars remained for two years on KTXA, moving to KDFI in 1995. The station became an outlet of the new United Paramount Network, UPN, upon its launch in January 1995.

In 2000, Viacom, the parent company of Paramount, purchased CBS. This created a duopoly, as CBS had spent $485 million the year before to buy KTVT, which switched from an independent station to a CBS affiliate in 1995. The deal closed in October 2000, and KTXA moved into KTVT's Fort Worth studios in 2001. That same year, the Mavericks returned to KTVT and KTXA after a three-year deal with KSTR-TV (channel 49) was cut short by that station's impending sale and conversion to Spanish-language programming. KTXA carried 25 of the 30 games aired by the two stations under the deal, and ratings increased 61 percent for the team. KTXA also produced The Mark Cuban Show, a weekly half-hour featuring the team's owner which was distributed to other CBS stations, as well as shows covering extreme sports and high school sports, and it covered the new Dallas Desperados of the Arena Football League. KTXA, KTVT, and the other Viacom Television Stations Group properties were transferred to CBS Corporation after National Amusements decided to split Viacom and CBS into separate companies on December 31, 2005.

=== Return to independence ===
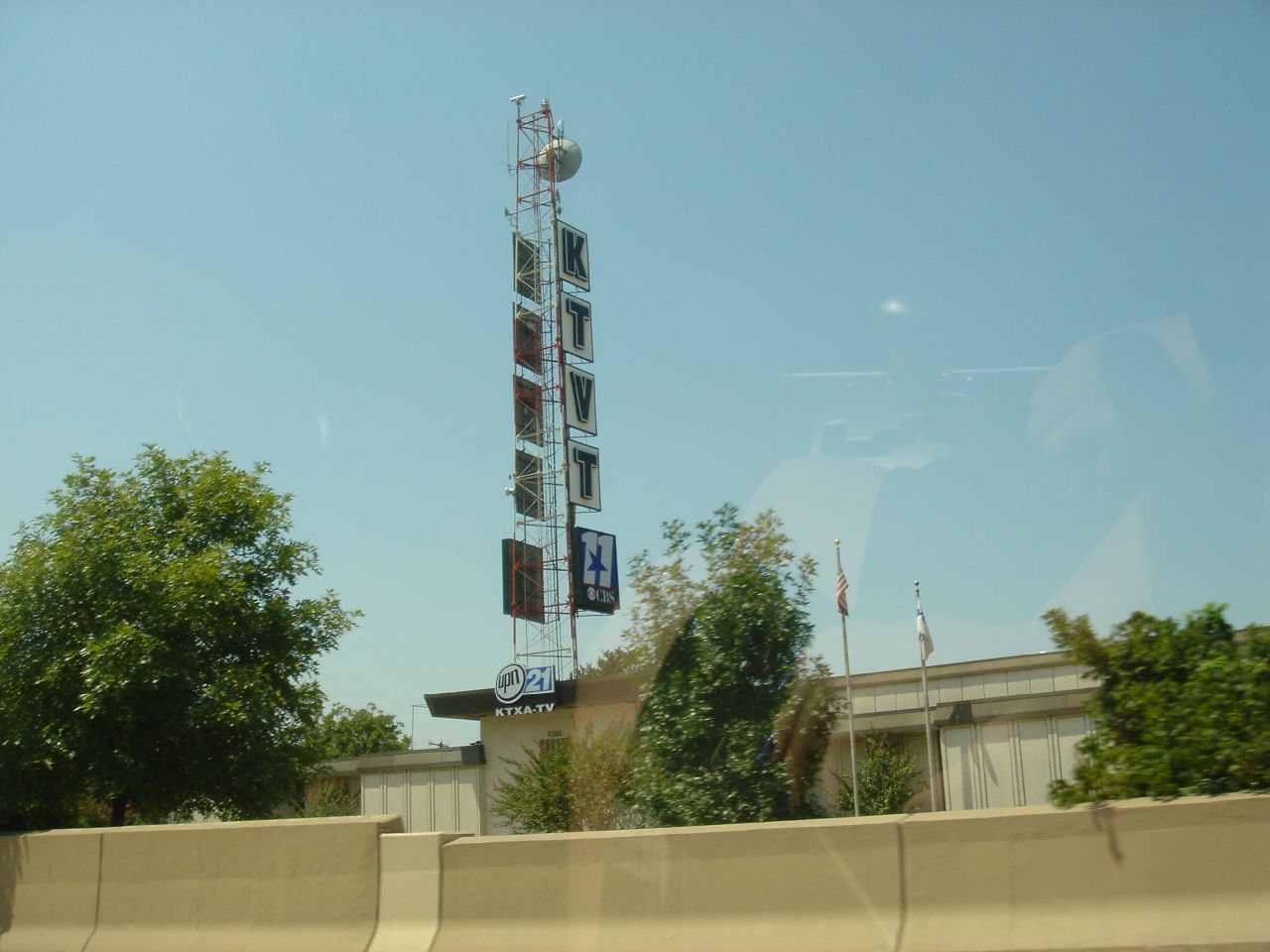
The KTVT–KTXA Dallas studio center, vacated by the stations in 2013 and since demolished, as seen in 2004.

In 2013, the stations moved their Dallas offices to a building further north along Central Expressway, known as the CBS Tower.

On January 24, 2006, CBS Corporation and the Warner Bros. unit of Time Warner announced that the two companies would respectively shut down UPN and The WB and combine the networks' respective programming to create a new "fifth" network called The CW; the day of the announcement, it was revealed that 11 of CBS Corporation's 15 UPN affiliates would become CW stations. The merger of networks, however, left out KTXA and two other CBS-owned UPN outlets, as 16 Tribune Broadcasting stations, including KDAF—regarded as one of the strongest affiliates of The WB—were selected.

Two months ago, we found out we were going to have two hours available in prime time. What to do? Took us about five seconds that we wanted to be local.

— Steve Mauldin, general manager of KTVT–KTXA, on programming channel 21 without network prime time programming

For the post-UPN programming lineup of what was dubbed "TXA 21", CBS opted for a strategy focusing on local news in prime time, which complemented the station's existing sports coverage and leveraged KTVT's newsroom and was modeled after KCAL-TV in Los Angeles, a CBS-owned station that specializes in prime time news. On September 18, 2006, KTVT began producing a nightly two-hour prime time newscast for KTXA, titled TXA 21 News: First In Prime, running for two hours from 7:00 to 9:00 p.m. The newscast had separate anchors to KTVT's news offerings, but sports was provided by KTVT sports director Gina Miller.

In 2010, KTXA entered into a five-year agreement with the Texas Rangers to show 25 baseball games per season (primarily on Friday nights), complementing the Mavericks and high school sports as well as syndicated college telecasts. The next year, they were joined by the Stars, which returned to channel 21 with a package of 15 games a year for four years. FC Dallas soccer was added in 2015, an arrangement that continued through 2022. (Note: All Major League Soccer local television rights agreements ended after 2022 to make way for MLS's 10-year deal with Apple.) After these agreements ended, KTXA continued to regularly serve as an overflow home for the Rangers, Mavericks, and Stars on Fox and Bally Sports Southwest.

After five years, on September 12, 2011, KTXA reduced the newscast to an hour-long block consisting of a half-hour local newscast at 7:00 p.m. and a half-hour sports program at 7:30 p.m. The evening newscast was cancelled outright on October 31, 2011; the sports show became The Fan Sports Show--based on then-sister sports radio station KRLD-FM 105.3 The Fan, hosted by Miller until her departure from KTVT, and continued to air until 2014.

On August 26, 2013, KTVT/KTXA moved its Dallas business operations, which included a news bureau and advertising sales, north from the former KTVT Dallas studio center to a redeveloped office building, which was renamed the CBS Tower; the former 24,000-square-foot (2,230 m^{2}) Dallas offices on North Central were purchased in 2015 to be demolished and replaced with a hotel.

CBS Corporation re-merged with Viacom on December 4, 2019, creating ViacomCBS (now known as Paramount Skydance Corporation).

On July 18, 2022, KTXA premiered CBS News DFW Now, a hybrid local and national newscast. The newscast, the national portions of which originate at CBS's news and innovation lab in Fort Worth, also airs on nine other CBS-owned CW affiliates and independent stations.

== Technical information and subchannels ==
KTXA's transmitter is located in Cedar Hill, Texas. Its signal is multiplexed:

Subchannels of KTXA
Subchannel	Res.	Short name	Programming
21.1	1080i	KTXA-DT	Main KTXA programming
21.2	480i	QVC	QVC
21.3	480i	[none]	Radar
21.4	480i	[none]	Dabl
21.5	480i	HSN	HSN

=== Analog-to-digital conversion ===
KTXA began transmitting a digital signal on UHF channel 18 on October 16, 2000. The station shut down its analog signal, over UHF channel 21, on June 12, 2009, as part of the federally mandated transition from analog to digital television.

The station's digital signal initially moved from channel 18 to 19, which had been used for KTVT. However, in the wake of the switch, KTVT, which had moved its digital signal to the VHF band, reported losses of as much as 57 percent of its over-the-air viewership. As a result, in September 2009, the FCC approved KTVT to move back to channel 19 and KTXA to eventually move to channel 29. On January 20, 2011, KTXA commenced operations on channel 29, ceasing operations on channel 18 the following day.
