= KDAF =

Television station in Dallas

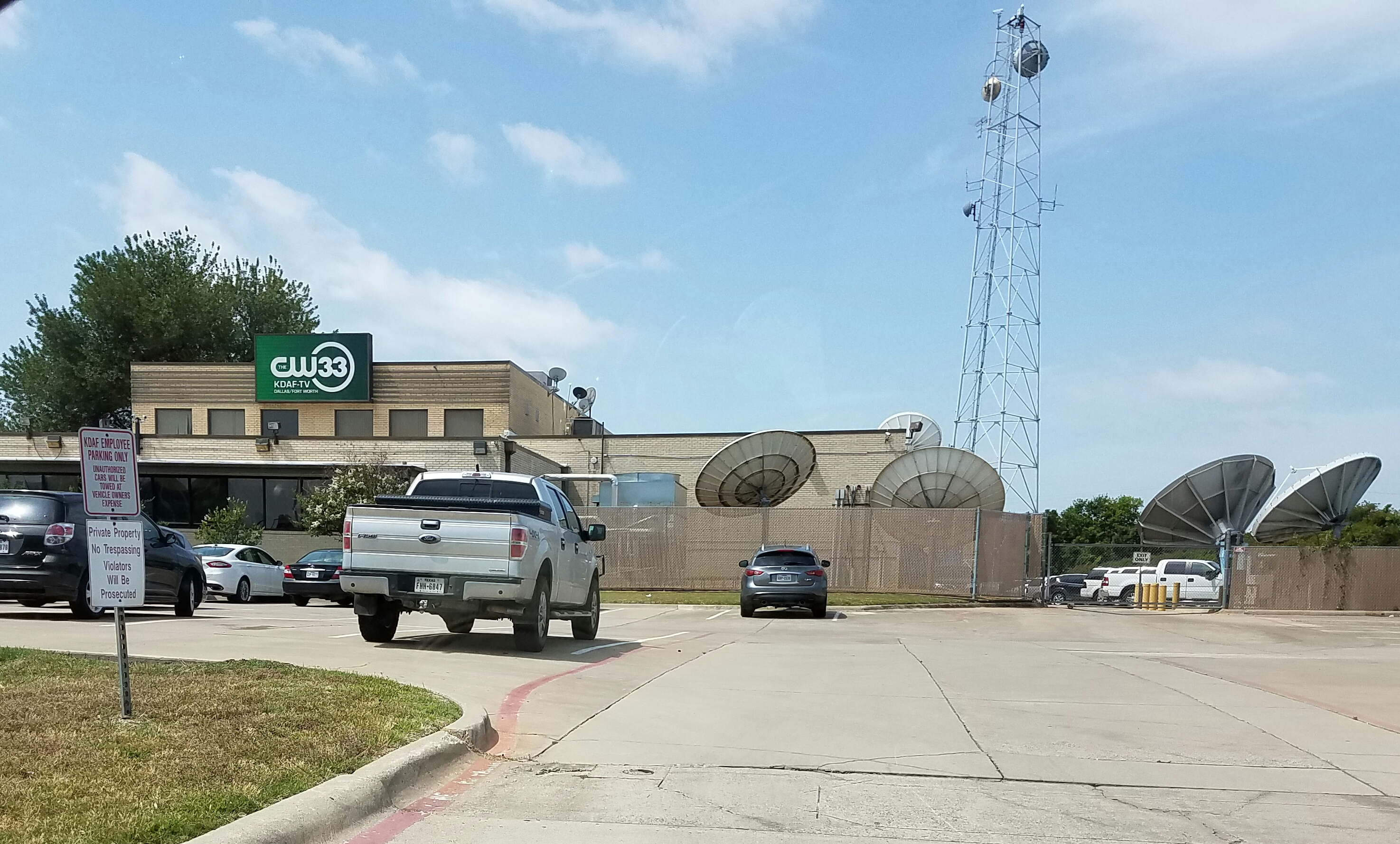
- KDAF's studios and offices in far northwest Dallas.
- Dallas–Fort Worth, Texas; United States
- City: Dallas, Texas
- Channels: Digital: 32 (UHF); Virtual: 33
- Branding: CW 33

Programming
- Affiliations: 33.1: The CW; for others, see § Technical information and subchannels

Ownership
- Owner: Nexstar Media Group; (Tribune Media Company)
- Sister stations: Tegna: WFAA, KFAA-TV

History
- First air date: September 29, 1980
- Former call signs: KNBN-TV (1980–1984); KRLD-TV (1984–1986)
- Former channel numbers: Analog: 33 (UHF, 1980–2009)
- Former affiliations: VEU (1980–1982); SIN (1981–1984); Independent (1984–1986); Fox (1986–1995); The WB (1995–2006)
- Call sign meaning: Dallas and Fort Worth

Technical information
- Licensing authority: FCC
- Facility ID: 22201
- ERP: 780 kW
- HAAT: 537 m (1,762 ft)
- Transmitter coordinates: 32°32′35″N 96°57′33″W

Links
- Public license information: Public file; LMS
- Website: cw33.com

KDAF (channel 33) is a television station licensed to Dallas, Texas, United States, serving as the Dallas–Fort Worth metroplex's outlet for The CW. It is owned by Nexstar Media Group, whose Tegna subsidiary owns ABC affiliate WFAA (channel 8) and independent station KFAA-TV (channel 29). KDAF's studios are located off the John W. Carpenter Freeway (State Highway 183) in northwest Dallas, and its transmitter is located in Cedar Hill, Texas.

KDAF launched in 1980 as KNBN-TV, which aired several types of specialty programs, including business news, subscription television, and Spanish-language programming. Metromedia acquired the station in 1984, converted it to an English-language independent station as KRLD-TV, and made the first of several efforts at local news. When Metromedia's television stations were purchased in 1986, KRLD-TV became KDAF and the Dallas–Fort Worth outlet of Fox; this continued until 1995, when a major realignment of affiliations saw Fox partner with another station and sell off channel 33. Tribune Broadcasting owned the station from 1996 to 2019; during this time, it was one of the most successful affiliates of The WB in the late 1990s and resumed local news production, which continued in some form for nearly two decades.

== Prior history of channel 33 in Dallas ==
Channel 33 was allocated to Dallas in 1966 as part of a settlement between two applicants that had been competing for channel 29: Maxwell Electronics Corporation and Overmyer Communications. In order to give each applicant a channel, Overmyer suggested moving channel 27 from Tyler to Dallas and substituting 33 for 29, with Overmyer taking 27 and Maxwell taking 33. While the Overmyer application ultimately was dropped, Maxwell's channel 33 went ahead, launching as independent station KMEC-TV on October 1, 1967. It was one of three new UHF independent stations in the Metroplex in six months (KFWT-TV [channel 21] had signed on September 19 and KDTV [channel 39] would debut in February 1968), and it was the first to fold. On October 25, 1968, Maxwell announced it was taking KMEC-TV dark and selling the station to Evans Broadcasting Company.

Evans did not restore KMEC-TV to operational status. Instead, it sold the construction permit in 1971 to Berean Fellowship International, which returned channel 33 to air as KBFI-TV on February 21, 1972. Berean, a locally based Christian ministry, operated the station as a family-oriented, general-entertainment independent with weekend religious programming. KBFI-TV lasted 10 months, closing on Christmas Eve.

The Portsmouth, Virginia–based Christian Broadcasting Network (CBN) purchased the license and returned channel 33 to the air on April 16, 1973, as KXTX-TV. It was CBN's third operating television station, after WYAH-TV in Portsmouth, and WHAE-TV in Atlanta. As did CBN's other independent stations (and KBFI-TV), it maintained a general entertainment and religious format. However, just two months later, Doubleday Broadcasting, the owner of KDTV which had sought to sell or donate the facility to a nonprofit organization, opted to donate the channel 39 license to CBN, which paid for $1.2 million in program contracts that had dampened interest in Doubleday's offer from educational groups. On November 14, 1973, KXTX-TV's programming and staff moved to channel 39, using the KDTV license and studio facilities.

== KNBN-TV ==
In 1974, the National Business Network applied to the Federal Communications Commission (FCC) for a new construction permit to launch a new station on that allocation, which was issued on June 13, 1977. NBN was a locally based group operated by Nolanda Hill and Sheldon Turner (both of whom, who had previously successfully lobbied the Dallas City Council to have a cable television franchise established in the city, each owned a 40% interest); other investors included, among others, radio broadcaster Gordon McLendon, who had made previous failed attempts to launch a UHF television station in the market and served as a commentator on precious metals once it launched.

The current television station that would become KDAF first signed on the air on September 29, 1980, as KNBN-TV. It operated from studio facilities located in a converted warehouse on 3333 Harry Hines Boulevard near downtown Dallas. The initial programming format consisted of business news programming during the daytime hours; evenings, meanwhile, were occupied by the subscription television service VEU (owned by Gene Autry's Golden West Broadcasters), featuring a mix of feature films, specials and, during the NBA season, Dallas Mavericks game telecasts. Golden West had purchased the franchise from Subscription Television of America, a company led by Dallas Cowboys owner Clint Murchison, as well as that company's franchises to operate in Chicago; Atlanta; San Francisco; and Providence, Rhode Island.

The original mix changed within a year when the station added programming from the Spanish International Network in the early evening hours. In March 1982, the remaining business programming disappeared after Turner was not able to build a national syndication base for NBN's output, and KNBN-TV began devoting its entire conventional broadcast day to Spanish programming from SIN. When VEU bought the subscriber base of rival service Preview, the service transitioned from channel 33 to KTWS-TV (channel 27) beginning in December; the decision was taken because the contract with KTWS-TV offered more flexibility for expansion than that with KNBN-TV, and Turner and Hill were reported to be unhappy with VEU.

== Metromedia ownership as KRLD-TV ==
In 1983, Hill Broadcasting sold KNBN to New York City-based Metromedia, which already owned independent stations in five of the six major U.S. cities where it owned television stations, for $15 million; the sale was finalized on November 8 of that year. While KNBN continued its existing programming, it was immediately apparent that it would not last for long. Though Hispanic leaders protested the change at the Metroplex's only Spanish-language station, it was to no avail, as Metromedia sought to switch to an English-language format that would attract advertisers.

On July 29, 1984, the station's call letters were changed to KRLD-TV to match radio station KRLD (1080 AM), which became a sister property to the television station after Metromedia successfully sought the FCC for a waiver of its cross-ownership regulations to let it retain KRLD radio and the UHF station. (This made channel 33 the second KRLD-TV in Dallas; the call letters had been used on channel 4 when it was co-owned with KRLD until 1970.) That same day, channel 33 relaunched as an English-language general-entertainment independent. Its operations relocated to studio facilities located next door to KRLD radio at the station's current facility on John W. Carpenter Freeway on the northwest side of Dallas. The new studio facilities, which replaced the Harry Hines Boulevard site that incoming anchor Quin Mathews called "a dump" and "a warehouse that had not even been disguised effectively as a television station", also included a newsroom, accommodating the centerpiece of KRLD-TV's programming, a 7 p.m. newscast. The newscast, along with plans that were ultimately delayed and aborted to start a local news service at Metromedia's WFLD-TV in Chicago, were part of securing the ability to co-own KRLD radio with the UHF station.

The new KRLD-TV was entering a very crowded marketplace, one of the justifications made by Metromedia in securing the waiver. Its competition included KTXA, KXTX-TV, and KTVT, the latter of which was the leading independent in the market at the time. Months later, channel 27 was relaunched as KDFI after it was sold to a group that immediately dropped the VEU programming. Even under Metromedia, one of the country's largest owners of major-market independents, channel 33 continued to underperform as most of the stronger programs available on the syndication market had been acquired by either its rival independents or by the market's network affiliates; the station also struggled to define a clear programming identity as it heavily incorporated movies, reruns, and children's programs, while the shows it did air were repeatedly moved to different time slots in hopes of shoring up their ratings. The station attempted a coup to improve viewership by acquiring the local rights to syndicated reruns of Dallas and Dynasty for a reported fee of up to $38,000 per episode, only for neither show to pull decent ratings locally when they joined the station in September 1985.

=== The KRLD 7 pm News ===
After channel 33 was sold to Metromedia, its new owners heavily invested in the creation of a news department for the-then KRLD-TV, acquiring modernized technology (including a computer system and several Sony Betacams) for production and newsgathering resources. The station's news staff was based in a small trailer parked within the Harry Hines Boulevard studios before moving into the larger Carpenter Freeway facility shortly before the newscast's launch.

On July 30, 1984, channel 33 debuted a nightly hour-long newscast at 7 p.m., which at the time was the only independent television newscast in the market. Its debut was less than auspicious, earning a .7 rating (amounting to less than seven-tenths of 1% of all households in the Dallas–Fort Worth market that watched the premiere broadcast), eventually rising to a peak of 2.0 within several months but still half of the target promised to advertisers. The KRLD 7 pm News would earn two United Press International awards in 1985 for "Best Newscast in Texas" and "Best Spot News" (for its coverage of the 1985 Mesquite tornado).

The news department underwent tumultuous changes in 1986. After original news director Tony deHaro, who had previously served in that same role at KRLD radio prior to Metromedia's purchase of channel 33, was fired by the station, he wrote a scathing letter to D Magazine criticizing the news department and KRLD-TV general manager Ray Schonbak, stating that Schonbak insisted on implementing "sensationalis[tic] and inflammatory" journalism techniques. At the time, station management acquired a state-of-the-art microwave live truck for newsgathering and drafted plans to open a bureau in Fort Worth. However, on May 10, 1986, shortly after News Corporation assumed control of the station following the completion of its merger with Metromedia, Schonbak announced channel 33's news department would shut down, stating to staff that the move was his decision; in an August 1986 article that he wrote for D Magazine, former anchor Quin Mathews (who joined KRLD from KDFW in 1984, and was later hired by WFAA [channel 8] as its morning and midday anchor after channel 33's news department folded) questioned whether the move was solely that of Schonbak or a directive by News Corporation management, noting that Schonbak had given Fox executives five different options for the news department to improve revenue and ratings, all of which were considered by the board to be unacceptable. Art Chapman in the Fort Worth Star-Telegram found the newscast lacked any elements to distinguish it from the other offerings in the market and blamed the time slot.

== As a Fox owned-and-operated station ==
In May 1985, Metromedia reached an agreement to sell KRLD-TV and its five sister independent stations—WNEW-TV (now WNYW) in New York City, KTTV in Los Angeles, WFLD-TV in Chicago, WTTG in Washington, D.C., and KRIV in Houston—to News Corporation for $2.55 billion. Metromedia sold its radio stations, including KRLD, to Carl Brazell in a $285 million transaction completed in early 1986.

That October, News Corporation–which had purchased a 50% interest in 20th Century Fox corporate parent TCF Holdings for $250 million in March 1985–announced its intentions to create a fourth television network that would use the resources of 20th Century Fox Television to both produce and distribute programming, intending for it to compete with ABC, CBS and NBC. The company formally announced the launch of the new network, the Fox Broadcasting Company, on May 7, 1986, with the former Metromedia stations serving as its nuclei. The purchase of the Metromedia stations was approved by the FCC and finalized on March 6, 1986, with News Corporation creating a new broadcasting unit, the Fox Television Stations, to oversee the six television stations. Concurrent with the completion of the Metromedia stations' acquisition by News Corporation, the station's call letters were changed to KDAF.

Even before the Fox network launched on October 6, 1986, the new ownership put its stamp on channel 33 by axing the news department after two years and laying off its 24 staff; it was performing poorly in the ratings, and Metromedia's commitment to news did not transfer after the station was sold to Fox. Although it was now part of a network, channel 33 was still generally an independent station, as Fox's initial programming consisted solely of a late-night talk show, The Late Show Starring Joan Rivers.

In 1993, Fox became a seven-night-a-week network for the first time. "Fox 33" had momentum: the network had pulled off a coup by obtaining television rights to the National Football Conference of the NFL, including the Dallas Cowboys. As a result of the network's growth and the station's increasing revenues, and accelerated by the football rights, Fox selected Lisa Gregorisch, who had been news director at the company's KSTU in Salt Lake City, to lead the development of what would be channel 33's second local news service, to start August 1, 1994. Gregorisch began hiring a "dream team" of reporters, editors, producers and photographers which would have staffed this news operation, which she stated in an interview with the Fort Worth Star-Telegram "could have 'shaken up this news market like never before'."

== Renaissance Communications ownership and WB affiliation ==
The football deal, however, also led Fox to pursue a strategy of upgrading its stations in major markets to increase the network's profile. Fox strategized to strengthen its affiliate portfolio by recruiting more VHF stations, especially those located in markets with an NFC franchise; at the time, Fox's stations were mostly UHF outlets that had limited to no prior history as major network affiliates. On May 23, 1994, News Corporation—as part of a deal that included its acquisition of a 20% equity interest in the latter company—signed a long-term affiliation agreement with New World Communications, in which Fox would affiliate with heritage "Big Three" network stations that New World either owned outright or was in the process of purchasing in twelve markets once their existing respective affiliation contracts expired.

The deal included four stations that New World would buy from Argyle Television Holdings for $717 million, including Dallas CBS affiliate KDFW-TV. Although the network already owned KDAF, Fox sought the opportunity to affiliate with a stronger VHF station with an established news operation in what was then the nation's seventh-largest market. Fox would put two stations up for sale—KDAF and WATL in Atlanta, which was in an identical situation—and the news plans were canceled. The news came with a gut punch, the very day the station took delivery of a fleet of news vans. Most of those hired as part of the aborted operation—around 20 people that were already hired and several others, including some on-air personalities, that made commitments to join the staff—were either able to re-sign in their previous positions at other stations or were placed by the group in positions at other Fox Television Stations properties.

The end of CBS's network's affiliation agreement with KDFW was July 1, 1995; the result was that KDAF remained a Fox affiliate through the 1994 NFL season. CBS, though, never pursued channel 33 as an affiliate. After approaching longtime NBC affiliate KXAS-TV (channel 5) and later being turned down for an affiliation deal by its then-owner LIN Broadcasting, on September 14, 1994, Gaylord Broadcasting reached an agreement to affiliate KTVT with CBS, in exchange for also switching its sister independent station in Tacoma, Washington, KSTW, to the network.

On November 15, 1994, Fox Television Stations announced that it would sell KDAF to Greenwich, Connecticut–based Renaissance Communications for $100 million; in exchange, Renaissance would sell existing Fox affiliate KDVR in Denver to Fox Television Stations for $70 million. Under the terms of the deal, Renaissance also reached an agreement with Time Warner in which KDAF would become an affiliate of The WB once the Fox affiliation moved to KDFW. This resolved a problem created by the affiliation switch for The WB. Gaylord had signed a group affiliation agreement for KTVT, KSTW in Seattle, and KHTV in Houston to join The WB at launch in January 1995; however, Gaylord's pact to affiliate with CBS in the first two markets effectively nullified the agreement, resulting in Time Warner filing an injunction in an attempt to dissolve the pact. Since KDAF could not join the network until KDFW's contract with CBS expired and Fox moved its programming to that station, The WB entered into a temporary affiliation arrangement with KXTX-TV to serve as its local affiliate in the interim.

The de facto trade of Dallas and Denver stations hit a roadblock that nearly prevented the exchange from taking place. On January 15, 1995, NBC filed a petition to the FCC that called on the agency to reject approval of the KDVR purchase, alleging that News Corporation, with its Australian-born CEO Rupert Murdoch, was in violation of FCC rules prohibiting foreign companies from holding more than a 25% ownership interest in an American television station. Fox had structured the KDVR-for-KDAF deal as two separate sales rather than as a trade with a cash exchange in likely anticipation of NBC trying to appeal the transaction and to ensure that Renaissance would continue on with its purchase of KDAF in either event. NBC withdrew the petition, as well as others it filed regarding other Fox station purchases, on February 17, 1995.

Fox's prime time and sports programming moved from KDAF to KDFW on July 2, 1995, with the CBS affiliation concurrently moving to KTVT. Although it lost the rights to most of Fox's programming, KDAF retained the local broadcast rights to the network's children's programming block, Fox Kids. KDAF took over the WB affiliation three days later, on July 5; the sales of KDAF to Renaissance Communications and KDVR to Fox were finalized on July 9. Channel 33 was able to upgrade its programming, particularly as KTVT's new network affiliation left several programs available in the market.

== Tribune Broadcasting ownership ==
On July 1, 1996, Chicago-based Tribune Broadcasting announced that it would acquire Renaissance Communications for $1.13 billion.

As a WB affiliate, KDAF benefited from higher-than-average ratings in Dallas–Fort Worth for WB network programs, and Tribune's buying power for syndicated shows also aided the station. Fox Kids was dropped in 1997 and moved to KDFW's sister station KDFI when The WB started its own children's block, Kids' WB. The success of KDAF spurred the launch of the third attempt—and second to become reality—at local news on channel 33, the "News@Nine", in 1999. By 2000, KDAF was considered one of The WB's strongest affiliates. In 2004, the station changed its on-air branding to "Dallas–Fort Worth's WB", de-emphasizing the station's channel number.

On January 24, 2006, Time Warner's Warner Bros. unit and CBS Corporation announced that the two companies would shut down The WB and UPN. In their place, the companies would combine the respective programming of the two networks to create a new "fifth" network called The CW. On that date, The CW also signed a ten-year affiliation agreement with Tribune Broadcasting, under which 16 of the group's 18 WB-affiliated stations—including KDAF—would serve as the network's charter stations. KDAF was chosen over CBS-owned KTXA as the higher-rated outlet.

=== News revival ===
KDAF revived its plans to re-establish a news department under Tribune ownership later in the 1990s as part of corporate efforts to launch in-house newscasts on the group's WB network affiliates, similar to commitments made by those of the Fox network earlier in the decade. In January 1999, the station began producing a half-hour prime time newscast at 9 p.m. on weeknights, the WB 33 News @ Nine. It was first anchored by Patrick Greenlaw and Crystal Thornton, alongside chief meteorologist Steve LaNore and sports director Bob Irzyk. The program was expanded to seven days a week, including Saturdays and Sundays, one year later in January 2000, with Dawn Tongish appointed as the program's weekend anchor; the Monday through Friday editions were then expanded to a full hour the year after that in January 2001, with the weekend newscasts following suit by 2003. The KDAF 9 p.m. newscast continually placed a distant second behind KDFW's established hour-long prime time newscast, which had grown to become the ratings leader in that time slot since its debut in mid-1995 upon that station's switch to Fox; in May 2001, it drew half the viewers of the KDFW offering.

In late February 2009, anchors Tom Crespo and Terri Chappell—who had served as main anchors of the program since 2004 and 2003, respectively—were replaced on the weeknight newscasts by existing general assignment reporter Amanda Salinas (later Fitzpatrick) and Walt Maciborski, who joined from WFTS-TV in Tampa. On September 21, 2009, KDAF debuted a nightly half-hour newscast at 5:30 p.m., also anchored by Salinas and Maciborski; this later moved to 5 p.m.

On October 31, 2011, KDAF began airing the Tribune-distributed morning news program EyeOpener, which had originally premiered five months earlier on May 9 as a test concept on Houston sister station KIAH. Initially airing only on weekday mornings (for three hours starting at 5 a.m.), before expanding to include hour-long weekend editions in April 2015, the program's hybrid format was billed as a "provocative and unpredictable" combination of daily news, lifestyle, entertainment, and opinion segments. The program's national segments were produced at KDAF. Tribune gradually began syndicating the program to some of its other CW and independent stations as well as a non-Tribune station in Myrtle Beach, South Carolina, all of which provided local news and weather segments during the program.

During the summer of 2012, KDAF's news department underwent a series of staff departures: following ratings declines during his tenure, news director David Duitch left the station in July to become website editor for The Dallas Morning News; that August saw the departures of chief meteorologist Bob Goosmann and sports reporter Chase Williams, the resignation of reporter Giselle Phelps and Walt Maciborski's departure for Fox-affiliated sister station WXIN in Indianapolis. On August 16 of that year, EyeOpener senior producer Larissa Hall was promoted to a director of content position to oversee the newscasts.

=== Nightcap ===
Nightcap newscast logo, used from November 1, 2012, to May 19, 2014.

On September 4, 2012, KDAF management announced in a meeting with station staff that it would adopt a format similar to EyeOpener for the 5 and 9 p.m. newscasts, in order to reduce production and operation costs for the news department and to make the broadcast profitable. The evening newscasts were revamped under the Nightcap concept on November 1, 2012; the program made use of multimedia journalists (which require a single person to film, edit and report news stories) and incorporated humor within most of its story content, except for news items and feature pieces that warranted a more serious tone. New staff members were hired to anchor and report for the newscasts, while about half of the newsroom staff (including several employees that were with KDAF since the third news department's inception in 1999) were laid off.

Even with the format switch, KDAF remained in last place among Dallas–Fort Worth's news-producing English-language stations, with viewership having declined to the point of registering "hashmarks" (indicating viewership too low to register a ratings point) on some nights during the initial switch to the Nightcap format. Ratings slowly increased over the next year-and-a-half while the format was instituted, particularly in the key age demographic of adults 25–54. Larissa Hall, who oversaw Nightcap's launch as KDAF's director of content, left the station at the end of 2012, shifting to other duties within the Tribune corporate umbrella and giving Nightcap only partial oversight.

=== NewsFix and Morning Dose ===
In November 2013, KDAF hired Steve Simon (a former weekend anchor-turned-producer at KIAH) as its news director. While in Houston, Simon helped launch NewsFix, a stylized news format that first launched in March 2011 on KIAH and de-emphasized on-camera anchors and reporters, using only an off-camera narrator for continuity and requiring fewer staff than most news programs. Many on-air members of the KDAF news staff departed in the months prior to the format change, including longtime reporter Barry Carpenter and anchor Amanda Fitzpatrick, both of whom were with the station prior to the adoption of the Nightcap format. NewsFix officially debuted on May 20, 2014, beginning with the 5 p.m. broadcast, with Greg Onofrio—a Houston radio personality who also continued to serve in the same capacity on the KIAH edition of the program—serving as its narrator, in addition to making on-screen appearances for a commentary segment at the end of the broadcast. On September 6, 2018, Tribune announced that NewsFix would be canceled effective September 14; Morning Dose, the successor program to EyeOpener, was concurrently canceled effective October 19.

== Nexstar ownership ==
Sinclair Broadcast Group entered into an agreement to acquire Tribune Media on May 8, 2017, for $3.9 billion, plus the assumption of $2.7 billion in Tribune debt. While Sinclair had initially intended on retaining KDAF, Cunningham Broadcasting—a partner licensee with family ties to Sinclair executive chairman David D. Smith—offered to purchase KDAF for $60 million, with Sinclair filing a shared services agreement (SSA) to operate the station. This proposed divestiture was one of several that attracted the scrutiny of FCC chairman Ajit Pai, prompting Sinclair to abandon the Cunningham deal in favor of finding a third party for KDAF. The FCC voted to send the entire merger before an evidentiary review hearing, and Pai publicly rejected it. Tribune Media terminated the merger proposal outright on August 9, 2018, filing a breach of contract lawsuit against Sinclair in the process.

Following the Sinclair deal's collapse, Nexstar Media Group—based in the Dallas suburb of Irving—announced their purchase of Tribune Media on December 3, 2018, for $6.4 billion in cash and debt. The sale was completed on September 19, 2019.

Nexstar acquired Tegna, owner of WFAA and KFAA-TV (channel 29), in a deal announced in August 2025 and completed on March 19, 2026. A temporary restraining order issued one week later by the U.S. District Court for the Eastern District of California, later escalated to a preliminary injunction, has prevented KDAF from being integrated into WFAA and KFAA.

=== Local programming ===
On March 13, 2019, the station began a partnership with Urban One, where the morning show from radio station KBFB (97.9 FM), Veda Loca in the Morning, was simulcast on KDAF from 6 to 8 a.m. During that time, it was known on-air as The Beat on 33. The partnership quietly ended on January 3, 2020, when Veda Loca in the Morning itself was canceled.

On June 1, 2020, the station premiered a daily morning talk show at 10 a.m. called Morning After, based on the video podcast of the same name. The show was hosted by Ron Corning and former KDFW anchor Jenny Anchondo.

As of 2020, the only local news on channel 33 was in the form of 30-second news inserts, introduced in April of that year. On August 16, 2026, KDAF began airing a 9 p.m. newscast produced by WFAA.

In January 2025, the Texas Rangers announced that as part of a new broadcast deal that would create the Rangers Sports Network, 15 regular-season games would air on KDAF on Friday nights and be syndicated on over-the-air stations across the Rangers' broadcast footprint.

== Technical information and subchannels ==
KDAF's transmitter is located in Cedar Hill, Texas. The station's signal is multiplexed:

Subchannels of KDAF
Subchannel	Res.	Short name	Programming
33.1	720p	KDAF-DT	The CW
33.2	480i	Antenna	Antenna TV
33.3	480i	Grit	Grit
33.4	480i	Charge	Charge!
33.5	480i	Rewind	Rewind TV

=== Analog-to-digital conversion ===
KDAF shut down its analog signal, over UHF channel 33, at 8 a.m. on June 12, 2009, as part of the federally mandated transition from analog to digital television; the station's digital signal remained on its pre-transition UHF channel 32, using virtual channel 33.
