= Preview (subscription service) =

American subscription television service

- Country: United States
- Broadcast area: Worcester–Boston; Cleveland; Dallas–Fort Worth; St. Louis

Programming
- Language: English

Ownership
- Owner: Time, Inc. (1980–1983); Independent American Satellite Television, Inc. (1983–1985)

History
- Launched: September 8, 1980 (46 years ago)
- Closed: December 31, 1985 (40 years ago)

Preview was an American over-the-air subscription television service provided in four markets in the United States, lasting from 1980 to 1985. It was founded by American Television and Communications, the cable division of Time, Inc., and provided service in the Worcester, Massachusetts–Boston, Cleveland, and Dallas–Fort Worth markets as well as a fourth system, using the name but separately owned, in St. Louis. Like the similar services offered by ON TV and SelecTV in other U.S. markets, Preview broadcast a scrambled signal on a UHF television station, requiring a special set-top box to decode the signal. Programming included movies, sports, and special events.

At its peak, Preview served more than 125,000 subscribers in its four markets. Like all subscription television businesses, Preview was harmed by a poor economy and the deployment of cable television, which offered more channels. The Dallas operation was sold in 1982 and merged with its competitor in that market, VEU; the St. Louis operation, which had particularly struggled, closed on February 28, 1983; and the Cleveland service was shuttered on August 31 of that year. VEU's owner, Independent American Satellite Television of Dallas, acquired the Worcester–Boston operation in late 1983 and continued subscription service through December 31, 1985.

== Markets ==
=== Worcester–Boston ===
Preview was most successful in Boston, its first market, where subscription television programs began to air on WSMW-TV (channel 27) in Worcester, Massachusetts, on September 8, 1980. WSMW had to fight competition from StarCase on WQTV channel 68 and a perception that its transmitter in Worcester was weak. Preview rapidly signed up 10,000 customers by November 1980 and 17,000 by January 1981 for its programming, which began at 7 p.m. on weeknights and 3 p.m on weekends.

By June 1982, WSMW had the seventh-most subscribers of any STV system in America, with 60,000. Its principal competitor, Star on WQTV (the renamed StarCase), had 52,000. Preview reaped a windfall in February 1983 when Star, ceased operations; Preview bought the subscriber list and temporarily simulcast most of its programming on both channels 68 and 27 until it could switch Star TV subscribers to Preview equipment. Preview also progressively expanded its broadcast day; it moved up its start time two hours to 5 p.m. in February and, on July 1, 1983, to 9 a.m. on weekdays and all day on weekends.

In late 1983, Time exited the STV industry by selling the subscription service, with 40,000 subscribers at the time, to Independent American Satellite Television, Inc., of Dallas. Independent American had earlier that year bought the VEU service on Dallas's KNBN-TV. A representative of Time Inc. indicated that new WSMW-TV owner Nolanda Hill was an investor in Independent American Satellite Television. Time exited the STV business by selling the operation, which at the time had 40,000 subscribers. In September 1983, Sibos announced that it had sold WSMW-TV to Central Massachusetts Television Inc., owned by Nolanda Hill of Dallas. Management initially expressed hope that, under the new owners, WSMW-TV could increase local program output, though that was dependent on their contract with Preview. Even though Central Massachusetts Television wanted to reduce STV airtime to add financial news and Spanish-language local programming, Preview's contract allowed the company to buy the airtime it wanted. During the sale process, Preview was also sold to Independent American Satellite Television, a subsidiary of the Independent American Group of Dallas, which earlier that year had bought the VEU service on Dallas's KNBN-TV, the station Hill had helped to found there. A representative of Time Inc. indicated that Hill was an investor in Independent American Satellite Television.

Preview programming was cut back to start at 7 p.m. by 1985. At the start of December, Preview informed its subscribers that it would cease service at year's end. It cited competition from sales of decoders, a threat to a business model that relied on monthly subscriptions, and historic lows in subscriptions, which had fallen back to 15,000 by July and 10,000 by December. A Preview executive noted that the closures of other STV operations left a surplus of decoder equipment which could be modified to work on WSMW's service. SelecTV provided Preview's programming in its last months on air.

=== Cleveland ===
Preview debuted in Cleveland on March 7, 1981—four days after the station that broadcast it, WCLQ-TV (channel 61). It was able to obtain some rights to Cleveland Cavaliers NBA basketball during its operational period. However, as in other markets, Preview struggled. Cleveland's more affluent suburban areas were wired for cable much faster than anticipated, taking away a critical segment of Preview's potential customer base. While Preview Cleveland at its peak numbered nearly 40,000 subscribers, it had fallen to just 23,000 by mid-1983, prompting the STV service to close down effective August 31, 1983. Observers also cited poor marketing and customer service.

=== Dallas ===
In Dallas, Preview entered the most competitive STV market in the nation, with two over-the-air competitors: ON TV and VEU. Preview was broadcast on a new station, KTWS-TV (channel 27). ATC exited Dallas not by shuttering its Preview service but by selling it to Golden West Broadcasters, the parent company of VEU, in September 1982. The deal, which was estimated at between $15 and $18 million, combined Preview's 25,000 subscribers with the 42,000 of VEU. VEU, which had broadcast over KNBN-TV (channel 33), began simulcasting on KTWS, to which all subscribers were moved by mid-December.

=== St. Louis ===
Preview in St. Louis was among the shortest-lived STV operations in the country, operating over KDNL-TV (channel 30) for just seven months. It began operating June 1, 1982, with 2,500 households signed up for the first night of programming. In contrast to most STV operations, Preview St. Louis struggled to attract interest from professional sports teams—seven St. Louis Cardinals baseball games aired on the service, but the St. Louis Blues and St. Louis Steamers expressed no interest. The system had only 10,000 subscribers, and KDNL owner Cox Enterprises announced before the end of the year it would drop Preview on February 28, 1983, laying off 77 employees in the process. Preview struggled with the depressed state of the St. Louis economy and the faster-than-anticipated wiring of area homes for cable. One source quoted by the St. Louis Post-Dispatch estimated the service made a loss of $100,000 a month.
