= KFWT-TV =

Television station in Fort Worth, Texas (1967–1969)

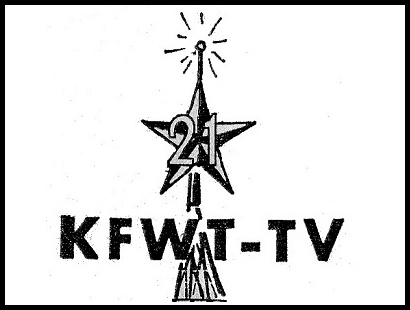
- Fort Worth–Dallas, Texas; United States
- City: Fort Worth, Texas
- Channels: Analog: 21 (UHF)

Ownership
- Owner: Trinity Broadcasting Company

History
- First air date: September 14, 1967
- Last air date: September 3, 1969; (1 year, 354 days)
- Call sign meaning: Fort Worth, Texas

Technical information
- ERP: 550 kW
- HAAT: 329 m (1,080 ft)
- Transmitter coordinates: 32°45′01″N 97°16′07″W

KFWT-TV (channel 21) was a television station licensed to Fort Worth, Texas, United States, which served the Dallas–Fort Worth metroplex from 1967 to 1969. The station was owned by the Trinity Broadcasting Company (not to be confused with the Trinity Broadcasting Network, a religious broadcaster established in 1973).

== History ==
On January 6, 1966, the Trinity Broadcasting Company, owners of KJIM-AM-FM in Fort Worth, was granted a construction permit for a new television station on ultra high frequency (UHF) channel 40 in Fort Worth. Trinity was left alone in its bid for the channel after Warner Bros. withdrew applications for UHF television stations in Fort Worth, Houston and Chicago, afraid that its antitrust record would result in lengthy and costly comparative hearings. Channel 20 had originally been assigned, but in 1965, the Federal Communications Commission (FCC) undertook a sweeping overhaul of the UHF table of allocations nationwide, using a UNIVAC III computer to determine new channel allocations. Trinity was upset that the lower channel 20 had been replaced with channel 40, questioning if the commission had "abdicated" its responsibilities to the computer.

In 1966, channel 40 was changed to 21; meanwhile, Trinity sold off KJIM and changed the FM station's call letters to KFWT, which were also adopted by the television station. KFWT-TV began broadcasting September 14, 1967, making it the first of three new UHF television stations in six months in the metroplex (alongside two Dallas-based outlets, KMEC-TV and KDTV). The station signed on using facilities leased from WBAP-TV in the Meadowbrook area of Fort Worth. At the outset, the station presented filmed and syndicated fare in color, though local shows were in black-and-white pending the delivery and installation of color studio equipment.

Channel 21, an independent station, emphasized live and local programming. Its flagship block of variety music shows included the hour-long Southwest Showcase and a country music half-hour hosted by Jim "Shootin'" Newton; it was followed by a rock program, The Marky Baby Show, fronted by KFJZ (1270 AM) DJ Mark Stevens. A prime time movie and 10 p.m. local newscast also aired on weeknights; on the weekends, KFWT-TV aired highlights of Fort Worth Texans football along with movies and syndicated shows.

By August 1969, however, financial difficulties had forced the station to go silent; at that time, Trinity owner W. C. Windsor, Jr., was reported to be in talks with a group of investors on the West Coast, including entertainer Danny Thomas, to buy KFWT-TV. The station spent a week off the air, temporarily returned after the FCC failed to grant permission to cease broadcasting in a timely manner, and then went silent on September 3. The general manager expressed hope that the station would return to the air in three months. The television station never sold, and Trinity Broadcasting Company filed for bankruptcy in March 1970. That October, a debt payment plan was agreed under which KFWT-FM was sold for $315,000; by that time, Trinity had $1.8 million in liabilities compared to $670,000 in assets. Ownership of more than $340,000 in television station equipment purchased from RCA reverted to that company.

Activity around the channel 21 allocation would not resume until 1976, when two groups—both named Channel 21, Inc.—filed to build new TV stations in Fort Worth. The resulting station, KTXA, signed on January 4, 1981.
