= WQHS-DT =

Television station in Cleveland

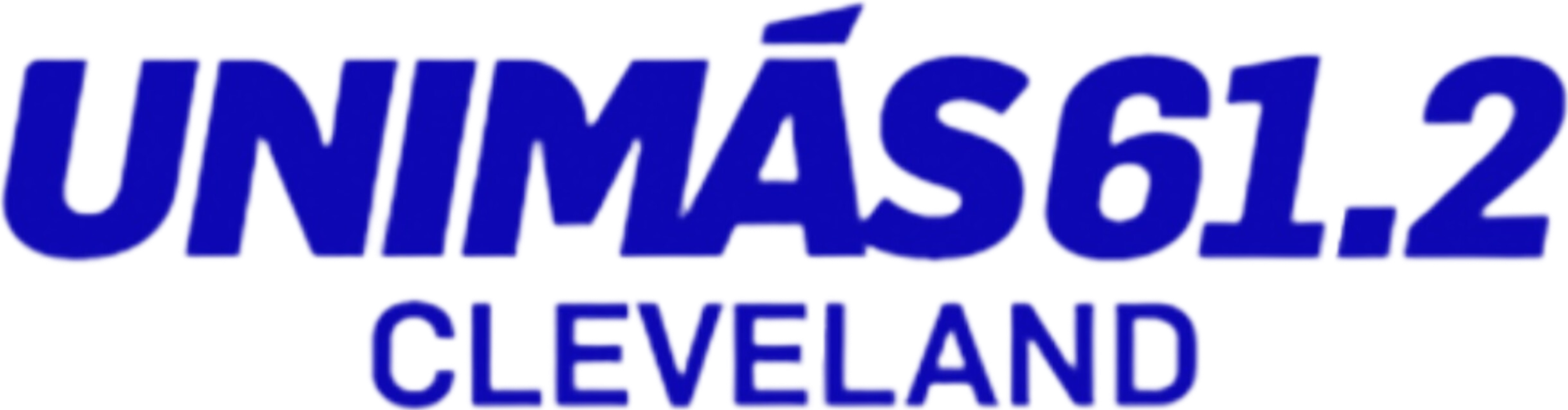
- Cleveland, Ohio; United States
- Channels: Digital: 36 (UHF); Virtual: 61
- Branding: Univision 61

Programming
- Affiliations: 61.1: Univision; 61.2: UniMás; for others, see § Subchannels

Ownership
- Owner: TelevisaUnivision; (Univision Cleveland LLC)

History
- First air date: March 3, 1981
- Former call signs: WCLQ-TV (1981–1986); WQHS (1986–1992); WQHS-TV (1992–2009)
- Former channel numbers: Analog: 61 (UHF, 1981–2009); Digital: 34 (UHF, 2003–2019)
- Former affiliations: Preview (1981–1983); Independent (1983–1986); HSN (1986–2002)
- Call sign meaning: Former Home Shopping Network affiliation

Technical information
- Licensing authority: FCC
- Facility ID: 60556
- ERP: 780 kW
- HAAT: 352 m (1,155 ft)
- Transmitter coordinates: 41°22′58″N 81°42′6″W

Links
- Public license information: Public file; LMS
- Website: www.univision.com

WQHS-DT (channel 61) is a television station in Cleveland, Ohio, United States, broadcasting the Spanish-language networks Univision and UniMás. Owned and operated by TelevisaUnivision, it is the only full-power Spanish-language television station in the state of Ohio. WQHS-DT's studios and transmitter are located on West Ridgewood Drive in suburban Parma.

This station's sign-on in 1981 as WCLQ-TV marked the return of broadcasting over channel 61 in Cleveland, a frequency unused since the closure of WKBF-TV six years earlier. It served as the market's original outlet for subscription television service Preview, and also carried a general slate of entertainment programming. Preview's 1983 closure forced WCLQ-TV to operate as a full-time independent station under the ownership of Channel Communications, which aggressively purchased syndicated reruns and movies but consistently ranked near the bottom of the local ratings. With the sign-on of two competing independent stations in 1985 and limited chance for profitability, the station was sold to Silver King Broadcasting, becoming one of the first owned-and-operated outlets for the Home Shopping Network (HSN) in 1986, when it changed its call sign to the present WQHS. The station was purchased by Univision in 2002 and has largely aired network programming since, with no local newscasts.

== Prior history of channel 61 ==
A previous license owned by Kaiser Broadcasting occupied channel 61 as WKBF-TV from January 1968 to April 1975. It was the first independent station to sign on in Cleveland and was Cleveland's first commercial ultra high frequency (UHF) station. WKBF struggled financially for the majority of its existence due to poor revenue growth; the station failed to achieve profitability while competing against rival independent WUAB (channel 43), which signed on nine months after WKBF in September 1968. In April 1975, Kaiser Broadcasting shut down WKBF-TV, returned the license to the Federal Communications Commission (FCC), and sold off WKBF's assets to WUAB's owner, United Artists Broadcasting; Kaiser then purchased a minority ownership in that station, which it retained until WUAB was sold in 1977.

== History ==
=== WCLQ-TV (1981–1986) ===
Even though WKBF-TV had largely failed, interest in channel 61 was fueled by the imminent maturity of subscription television (STV) technology. In January 1977, Cleveland Associates Co.—a consortium of Chicago firms Froelich Corporation, Balaban Television Corporation, Friedland Corporation, and Bray Corporation—filed an application for a construction permit to build channel 61 as a station that would operate on a hybrid basis. The station would air commercial, advertiser-supported programs during the day and scrambled STV programs to paying subscribers at night. A construction permit was awarded by the FCC in 1978, and WCLQ-TV began broadcasting on March 3, 1981, with a special prime time airing of the movie The Deer Hunter as its marquee program on launch day. Four days later, WCLQ-TV began airing STV programs from Preview, a division of Time Inc.'s American Television and Communications, after 8 p.m. on weekdays and 7 p.m. on weekends; the remaining time was occupied by a general-entertainment independent lineup. The station revived a character from the old WKBF-TV—The Ghoul, portrayed by Ron Sweed—when it added a horror movie showcase on September 25, 1982.

Preview's run on WCLQ-TV initially boasted a subscription base of nearly 35,000 at its peak in February 1982. The service carried select Cleveland Cavaliers games starting with the 1981–82 season, with executives mentioning a possible alliance with Cavaliers owner Ted Stepien's "Total Entertainment Network" as an additional programming tier. Ultimately, Preview lost nearly half of their subscription base to cable television systems in the market's affluent suburbs, along with piracy from different decoder boxes and a struggling area economy. Preview added a secondary service—the "adult"-themed Niteview—which only attracted half of Preview's subscribers, while the service itself was largely criticized for poor marketing and customer service. In addition to Preview's struggles, WCLQ-TV faced low ratings and a lack of media exposure, with general manager Gary Brandt publicly musing about The Chronicle-Telegram in Elyria listing the station as "WQLC". The station did make a further attempt at local programming with Video Arcade, a daily variety show aimed at older children with various old films, cartoons, music videos via Video Jukebox, and a local version of TV Powww.

When Time Inc. announced the closure of Preview in Cleveland on May 12, 1983, the service had 22,000 subscribers; for its final day on August 31, that number dropped to 14,000. The shutdown announcement caught station executives off guard, as syndicated programming for the coming television season had largely been committed to months earlier. WCLQ-TV filled the loss of Preview with a traditional mixture of off-network reruns, movies and Independent Network News (anchored by former Cleveland newscaster Bill Jorgensen); it also picked up CBS Late Night, which WJKW declined. WCLQ-TV also began carrying various sports packages—including Big Ten Conference football and basketball, Cleveland State Vikings men's basketball, and select NBA on CBS games WJKW deferred—but dropped much of these sports packages in the summer of 1985 for schedule consistency. The Ghoul was cancelled in the spring of 1984, attributed to low ratings, but it was later suggested that Brandt dropped it after an on-air skit involving a shed being set on fire outside of the studios.

Balaban Broadcasting and the other partners in Cleveland Associates sold WCLQ-TV to Channel Communications, a subsidiary of Nashville, Tennessee–based NASCO, Inc., on May 4, 1984, for $14 million (equivalent to $43.4 million in 2025). NASCO, which primarily handled National Football League merchandise, established Channel as a diversification move, purchasing WCLQ-TV along with two small-market network affiliates—KAIT in Jonesboro, Arkansas, and KPLC in Lake Charles, Louisiana—for a combined $48.8 million. Brandt resigned in late April 1985, with Channel director of operations Jack White taking over as interim general manager; rumors among staffers suggested Brandt was not asked to leave willingly. In a bid to remain competitive, WCLQ-TV acquired syndication rights to Dallas, Simon & Simon and The Love Boat in expensive contracts and began using Ernest P. Worrell (Jim Varney) in promotional spots and billboards. Later purchases included reruns of The A-Team and "lost episodes" of The Honeymooners. Dallas reruns fared poorly, only running on WCLQ-TV for six months before being removed from the schedule entirely.

The explosion of stations was more than the individual markets could absorb. There simply were too many stations and not enough advertising dollars.

— Dennis Thatcher, WOIO general manager

The summer of 1985 saw both WOIO and WBNX-TV sign on as independents: while WBNX-TV was owned by the ministry of televangelist Ernest Angley and positioned itself on family-oriented and religious fare, WOIO was financially backed by Malrite Communications (owners of WHK and WMMS) and Metroplex Communications (later owners of WNCX and WERE). WCLQ-TV's purchasing of expensive syndicated programming, in turn, increased prices for programming at both WOIO and WUAB substantially. The additional competition also drove down ratings and advertising rates; WOIO general manager Dennis Thatcher noted that WCLQ was selling advertising at low prices that were "almost cable rate levels". Driven into a financial crunch, WOIO's ownership group sought to sell outright to Malrite for an infusion of capital by June 1986, permissible by FCC regulations that typically barred common ownership of radio and UHF television stations except when the television station was in need of financial assistance. WCLQ-TV filed a petition to deny the sale.

The aggressive approach Channel Communications took with WCLQ-TV failed to yield a positive return on investment. The May 1985 sweeps period saw WUAB with 9 percent of viewers, WOIO with 6 percent, and WCLQ-TV with 5 percent, a trend that continued into the fall and spring. In January 1986, Channel president Brian Byrnes initiated a study with Shearson Lehman Brothers on possible options for the company, involving the sale of WCLQ-TV. He conceded that NASCO's earnings in 1985 were "not as good" as 1984. Though he denied suggestions WCLQ-TV was losing over $2 million in an interview with Crain's Cleveland Business, he told The Plain Dealer that the station was losing "a few million dollars" annually. General manager Jack White claimed Shearson Lehman contacted Channel on behalf of an investor, fueling the possibility of Rupert Murdoch buying WCLQ-TV for his nascent Fox Broadcasting Company. Fox, however, opted to partner with WOIO on June 4, 1986, after WUAB parent Gaylord Broadcasting declined to affiliate any of their stations with the network.

=== The HSN years (1986–2002) ===
I wouldn't pretend that this is a profit deal. Channel put a lot more than $1 million in this station. Estimates are that the station won't go into the black until September or October of 1987, and I think Channel was just tired of losing money. At least they didn't want to lose any more money.

— Jack White, WCLQ-TV general manager

After months of rumors, Clearwater, Florida–based Silver King Broadcasting, parent company of the Home Shopping Network (HSN), purchased WCLQ-TV for $15 million (equivalent to $44.1 million in 2025) on August 20, 1986. While technically at a profit, Channel Communications sold WCLQ-TV at a significant loss after making expensive programming purchases, with the earliest estimates of profitability for the station coming sometime in 1987. The following day, WCLQ-TV withdrew their petition contesting WOIO's sale to Malrite after failing to get support from the other television stations in the market and with the HSN sale rendering it moot. Lowell "Bud" Paxson, co-founder of HSN and co-owner of Silver King, previously announced plans to create a nationwide chain of stations supported by 14 owned-and-operated outlets (twelve owned outright and two with minority interest, as per FCC regulations) and a network of full-time and part-time affiliates. WCLQ-TV was the sixth station purchased by Silver King.

WCLQ-TV expanded to 24-hour broadcasting on September 8, 1986, with HSN accounting for 18 hours daily. The remaining six hours of programming—meant to fulfill advertising contracts and provide temporary cash flow—included a block of children's programming, Honeymooners reruns, and a feature movie. The sale also voided a new contract the station had signed for the Cleveland State Vikings; while White said the games would continue to air during the transition period, the university moved their games to WOIO. Several cable systems, including Warner Cable in Akron and Canton, quietly dropped WCLQ-TV in favor of Cable Value Network. WOIO and WUAB also had the option to purchase any syndicated programming dropped by WCLQ-TV.

During the license transfer process, program distributors 20th Century Fox Television, MCA Television, and Paramount Television sued Channel over "billed and unpaid license fees" totaling $387,342 (equivalent to $1.14 million in 2025), forcing Channel into Chapter 7 bankruptcy on October 24, 1986, later converted to Chapter 11 by November. Embassy Television also filed a petition with the FCC against the proposed sale of channel 61, claiming a loss of over $3 million in broken contracts by WCLQ-TV for the production company's situation comedies and movies. Channel also owed $10 million to bank Manufacturers Hanover. Worldvision Enterprises later sued Channel for $1.9 million in unpaid bills (equivalent to $5.38 million in 2025) in late April 1987. Channel had already sold KAIT and KPLC to Cosmos Broadcasting in early October 1986, exiting broadcasting altogether.

Once the sale was finalized on December 24, 1986, the remaining entertainment programming was dropped and the call sign changed to WQHS, reflecting the Silver King/HSN ownership. Mark Dawidziak of the Akron Beacon Journal later referred to WCLQ-TV's demise as the station falling victim to the end of the "indy boom" within the television industry. The station carried HSN programming around the clock with one notable exception: for a 13-week period in 1989, WQHS carried a video simulcast of WMJI's morning-drive show with John Lanigan, a programming experiment tried out at other HSN owned-and-operated stations.

=== Univision years (2002–present) ===
In the late 1990s, USA Broadcasting (renamed from Silver King in 1998 after a restructuring of HSN, Inc. by chairman Barry Diller) began a years-long rollout to convert its HSN stations into general-entertainment independents using a local programming-heavy format known as "CityVision". The first CityVision station, WAMI in Miami, launched in 1998, and cheaper versions of CityVision were introduced in the Atlanta, Boston, and Dallas–Fort Worth markets. However, after the format failed to take off where it was introduced and the company registered operating losses of $62 million in 2000 (equivalent to $116 million in 2025), Diller opted to sell the station group to the Spanish-language network Univision on December 7, 2000, for $1.1 billion (equivalent to $2.06 billion in 2025) in cash.

Seven of the USA Broadcasting stations acquired by Univision were in markets with an existing Univision station, but the deal marked Univision's entrance into the Cleveland market. Cleveland had an estimated 25,000 Hispanic households and 77,000 viewers, per Nielsen, and had historically lagged other markets its size in the availability of non-English-language television programming. As a result, throughout 2001, there was speculation that Univision would attempt to sell WQHS-TV, either to be paired with another Cleveland television station or as an outlet for games of the Cleveland Indians baseball team, whose broadcasting contract with WUAB expired after 2001. Even though speculation continued, WQHS-TV joined Univision on January 14, 2002, making it the first Spanish-language broadcast TV station in the region.

In 2005, the United Church of Christ petitioned the FCC to deny a renewal of WQHS-TV's license over Univision's classification of Saturday morning repeats of the children's telenovela Cómplices Al Rescate as meeting E/I (educational/instructional) requirements; the case was settled in 2007 with the payment of a $24 million fine by the network, covering violations of the law at WQHS and other Univision stations.

WQHS has never produced a full-length local newscast. The first such newscasts in Spanish in the Cleveland market debuted in January 2022 when Gray Television, owner of WOIO and WUAB, launched Telemundo outlet WTCL-LD (channel 6).

== Technical information ==
=== Subchannels ===
WQHS-DT is broadcast from a transmitter on West Ridgewood Drive in Parma. Its signal is multiplexed:

Subchannels of WQHS-DT
Subchannel	Res.	Short name	Programming
61.1	720p	WQHS-DT	Univision
61.2	720p	UNIMAS	UniMás
61.3	480i	Great	Great (4:3)
61.4	480i	Nosey	Confess
61.5	480i	HSN 2	HSN2
61.6	480i	SHOP LC	Shop LC
61.7	480i	BT2	Infomercials
61.8	480i	MSGold	MovieSphere Gold

Subchannel broadcast with MPEG-4 video

=== Analog-to-digital conversion ===
WQHS shut down its analog signal, over UHF channel 61, on June 12, 2009, the official date on which full-power television stations in the United States transitioned from analog to digital broadcasts under federal mandate. The station's digital signal continued to broadcast on its pre-transition UHF channel 34, using virtual channel 61. WQHS relocated its signal from channel 34 to channel 36 on August 2, 2019, as a result of the 2016 United States wireless spectrum auction.
