= Golden West Broadcasters =

American media company (1951–1997)

- Industry: Broadcast television; broadcast radio
- Founded: 1951
- Founders: Gene Autry; Bob Reynolds
- Defunct: 1997
- Fate: Liquidation of assets
- Headquarters: Hollywood, California, United States

Golden West Broadcasters was an umbrella investment company founded and co-owned by late actor/singer Gene Autry (1907–1998) and late two-time All-American and former Detroit Lions tackle Bob Reynolds (1914–1997). Headquartered in Hollywood, California, in addition to broadcast television and radio, Autry and Reynolds also invested in real estate as well as ownership stakes in the Hollywood Stars baseball team of the Pacific Coast League and the Los Angeles Angels of Major League Baseball. The company owned and operated several television and radio stations from 1951 to 1982, and also provided services to and for other third-party, non-owned stations through the Golden West Radio Network.

== History ==
In 1951, Autry and Reynolds formed Golden West Broadcasters with their acquisition of KMPC (now KSPN) 710 AM in Los Angeles, while Reynolds served and worked as the station's manager. They followed that up by taking its first ever television station, KOPO-TV (now CBS affiliate KOLD-TV) in Tucson, Arizona, to the air in two years later, and then with additional acquisitions including most importantly, KTLA in Los Angeles, which continues to operate from the very same site at which the company and the station co-existed on Sunset Boulevard in Hollywood to this very day. Over time, Autry took control of the company with other co-investors in later years. Golden West also operated several cable television systems across the country during the 1970s and into the 1980s. Autry began their gradual exit from the broadcasting industry beginning in 1982 with the sale of KTLA to Kohlberg Kravis Roberts, culminating with the sale of KSCA 101.9 FM in Glendale, California – within the Los Angeles area, to Heftel Broadcasting Corporation in 1997.

== Former stations ==
- Stations are arranged in alphabetical order by state and city of license.
- Two boldface asterisks appearing following a station's call letters (**) indicate a station built and signed on by either Golden West or Gene Autry personally.

Stations owned by Golden West Broadcasters
Media market	State	Station	Purchased	Sold	Notes
Phoenix	Arizona	KOOL	1956	1978	
Phoenix	Arizona	KOOL-FM	1956	1982	
Phoenix	Arizona	KOOL-TV **	1953	1982	
Tucson	Arizona	KOLD **	1947	1977	(Note: Known as KOPO prior to 1957, and again after 1969.)
Tucson	Arizona	KOLD-TV **	1953	1969	(Note: Known as KOPO-TV prior to 1957.)
Los Angeles	California	KMPC	1952	1994	
Los Angeles	California	KSCA	1985	1997	(Note: Known as KUTE prior to 1987, KMPC-FM from 1987 to 1989, KEDG in 1989, and KLIT from 1989 to 1994.)
Los Angeles	California	KTLA	1964	1982	
San Francisco	California	KSFO	1956	1983	
Detroit	Michigan	WCXI	1977	1986	(Note: Known as WCAR prior to 1978.)
Detroit	Michigan	WCXI-FM	1977	1986	(Note: Known as WCAR-FM prior to 1978 and WTWR from 1978 to 1982.)
Oklahoma City	Oklahoma	KAUT-TV	1979	1985	
Portland	Oregon	KEX	1967	1984	
Portland	Oregon	KQFM	1978	1984	(Note: Known as KKRZ from 1983 onward.)
Seattle–Tacoma	Washington	KVI	1959	1994	
Seattle–Tacoma	Washington	KPLZ-FM	1976	1994	(Note: Known as KVI-FM from 1976 to 1978.)
