= KPXG-TV =

Television station in Salem, Oregon

- Salem–Portland, Oregon; United States
- City: Salem, Oregon
- Channels: Digital: 22 (UHF); Virtual: 22

Programming
- Affiliations: 22.1: Ion Television; for others, see § Subchannels

Ownership
- Owner: Ion Media; (Ion Media License Company, LLC)

History
- First air date: November 21, 1981
- Former call signs: KECH (1981–1986); KWVT (1986–1987); KHSP (1987–1988); KBSP-TV (1988–1998)
- Former channel numbers: Analog: 22 (UHF, 1981–2008); Digital: 4 (VHF, 2004–2008)
- Former affiliations: Independent (1981–1987); ON TV (1982–1984); HSN (1987–1998)
- Call sign meaning: Pax TV Oregon

Technical information
- Licensing authority: FCC
- Facility ID: 5801
- ERP: 1,000 kW
- HAAT: 510 m (1,673 ft)
- Transmitter coordinates: 45°31′20.5″N 122°44′49.5″W

Links
- Public license information: Public file; LMS
- Website: iontelevision.com

KPXG-TV (channel 22) is a television station licensed to Salem, Oregon, United States, broadcasting the Ion Television network to the Portland area. Owned by the Ion Media subsidiary of the E. W. Scripps Company, the station broadcasts from a transmitter located in the Sylvan-Highlands section of the city.

KPXG-TV was started as independent station KECH in 1981. Never truly successful, it filed for bankruptcy within two years. From 1987 to 1998, it primarily broadcast Home Shopping Network (HSN) programming before being purchased for the launch of Pax, predecessor to Ion.

== History ==
=== KECH ===
Channel 22 in Salem, Oregon, was switched from a noncommercial to a commercial assignment in April 1979, when the Federal Communications Commission (FCC) approved a request to reclassify Salem's KVDO-TV (channel 3), a commercial station that had since been bought by state public broadcaster OEPBS, as a noncommercial station in preparation for its eventual move to Bend. A year later, an application for the channel was filed by a company known as Greater Willamette Vision. Its investors were Arnold Brustin and Chris Desmond, both formerly associated with CBS. The FCC granted the application on January 23, 1981; Brustin and Desmond then filed for subscription television (STV) authorization as well. After a $4 million investment, KECH ("KECH 22", said like Catch-22) began on November 21. Even though KECH was just the second independent station serving the Portland market, a third planned station in Vancouver, Washington, had already tied up a significant quantity of syndicated programming and movies. KLRK (channel 49), which signed on as KPDX in 1983, was being purchased in the middle of construction by Camellia City Telecasters of Sacramento, California, which already had experience in programming independent stations. By the time KECH was on the air, Camellia City already had spent $10 million on programming rights, leaving lesser shows for channel 22 to broadcast. When Larry Black, who also owned stakes in two Portland cable systems, and KECH filed a petition to deny the completion of the KLRK sale on the grounds that Camellia was involved before the sale's completion in contravention of FCC rules, Camellia countered that Black had attempted to undercut its bid to shareholders of the unbuilt Vancouver outlet and even had proposed that it operate as a repeater of KECH.

The subscription operation, broadcasting in evening hours, did not start at the same time as KECH's ad-supported programming. In January 1982, Willamette STV, a related company to Greater Willamette Vision, entered into a licensing agreement with Oak Communications, owners of the ON TV system, to start the eighth—and last—ON TV system to begin service. By June, it had 12,000 subscribers, making it the smallest ON TV-branded STV operation. Brustin and Desmond deepened their involvement in subscription television by acquiring a multipoint distribution system operation that delivered HBO to 10,000 area households from Canadian firm Rogers Cable.

The young television station and the STV operation, which was a separate but affiliated business venture, would experience a year of disarray in 1983. That May, the subscription service, while still called ON TV, began to receive its programming from rival SelecTV after Brustin and Desmond were brought in to manage the subscription offerings of KTSF in San Francisco on an interim basis. In August, the station was put up for sale for an $8 million asking price, and a court filing in a lawsuit against Willamette STV revealed that it had lost $6.6 million in its first year of operation and was deep in debt. Ron Cowan, the television columnist for the Statesman-Journal, opined that KECH "never has risen much above the dismal level of its early scheduling". Willamette STV filed during the summer for bankruptcy protection, owing $4.7 million to 20 major creditors, including the Greater Willamette Vision affiliate that leased airtime from KECH; Oak; and HBO. Limited partners in the station briefly pursued a lawsuit against Brustin and Desmond in an attempt to salvage the operation. In November 1983, Greater Willamette Vision joined Willamette STV in bankruptcy after two firms filed lawsuits seeking more than $620,000 from the company; most of its major creditors were programming suppliers.

=== Life after STV: independent and home shopping ===
On August 19, 1984, KECH discontinued ON TV, though it stated that it planned to broadcast late-night adult movies as a subscription service under the name "Cascade Entertainment Network", which was the new name of Willamette Subscription Television. The move would have been a last gasp by Cascade to remain in business; even though the service had aired the Portland Trail Blazers for two seasons, the team ignored a contract through 1989, with an employee stating the Blazers "just don't consider the company to be in existence, as far as we're concerned". Rogers bought back the microwave distribution service.

In September 1985, Emerald City Broadcasting, owned by Robert Finkelstein of Los Angeles, acquired KECH-TV in exchange for assuming $4.8 million in debt from Greater Willamette Vision; Desmond continued as general manager. Finkelstein launched a new local news program in February 1986: The Valley News, with early and late newscasts focusing on news of the Willamette Valley area. Viewer response was underwhelming; ratings were low, in part because they measured viewership in the entire Portland television market. In late 1986, the call letters were changed to KWVT, for "Willamette Valley Television".

Finkelstein put KWVT up for sale in January 1987 and announced that The Valley News would be discontinued on February 15. It found a buyer on a shopping spree: the Home Shopping Network (HSN).

KWVT discontinued all but several hours a week of its entertainment programming on March 31, 1987, to begin airing HSN, giving the network its first broadcast outlet in the state. Days later, Silver King Broadcasting, the broadcast stations division of HSN, completed an agreement to buy the station for $5 million. After the sale completed, the call sign was changed to KHSP.

HSN had scarcely owned the newly renamed KHSP before selling it to Blackstar Communications, a Black-owned company, as part of an affiliation agreement and investment in the firm that saw Blackstar purchase KHSP for $5.135 million and pick up HSN's option on WMOD, serving Melbourne and Orlando, Florida. The investors in Blackstar, including Wesley S. Williams Jr., were involved with a venture capital fund started by the National Association of Broadcasters. While the call letters were changed to KBSP-TV after the sale, channel 22 continued to air home shopping programming and community programming under the "In Your Interest" banner.

=== Pax/Ion ownership ===
Paxson Communications Corporation, the predecessor to Ion Media, acquired KBSP-TV in 1998 from Blackstar for $30 million, at the same time that USA Broadcasting—the renamed Silver King—acquired most of Blackstar's other assets. Blackstar, Paxson, and USA Broadcasting engaged in a complicated deal around the transactions that saw Paxson pay an additional $15 million to exit its Portland HSN affiliation agreement and lease out HSN stations in New Orleans and Memphis. In advance of the August 31, 1998, launch of Pax, Paxson's new network, the station switched to infomercial programming on June 19. Paxson also built Portland studios and offices for the station.

From 2001 to 2005, as part of a national association between Pax and NBC, NBC affiliate KGW managed KPXG-TV's operations via a sales agreement. Operations moved into KGW's studios, and the station provided newscasts for air on KPXG-TV, initially reruns of its 6 and 11 p.m. newscasts and, from January 2003 to October 2005, a live 10 p.m. newscast. After changing its name to i: Independent Television in 2005, the network became known as Ion Television in 2007, following the 2006 name change of Paxson Communications Corporation to Ion Media Networks. The E. W. Scripps Company acquired Ion in a deal announced in 2020 and completed in 2021.

In 2014, Ion donated KPXG-LD (channel 42), a translator previously used to improve the station's signal in parts of Portland, to Word of God Fellowship, parent company of the Daystar Television Network.

== Technical information ==
=== Subchannels ===
KPXG-TV broadcasts from a transmitter in the Sylvan-Highlands area of Portland. The station's signal is multiplexed:

Subchannels of KPXG-TV
Subchannel	Res.	Short name	Programming
22.1	720p	ION	Ion Television
22.2	720p	Bounce	Bounce TV
22.3	480i	Laff	Laff
22.4	480i	IONPlus	Ion Plus
22.5	480i	BUSTED	Busted
22.6	480i	GameSho	Game Show Central
22.7	480i	QVC	QVC
22.8	480i	HSN	HSN

=== Analog-to-digital conversion ===
KPXG-TV shut down its analog signal, over UHF channel 22, on December 3, 2008. The station's digital signal relocated from its pre-transition VHF channel 4 to UHF channel 22.
