= WSNS-TV =

Television station in Chicago

- Chicago, Illinois; United States
- Channels: Digital: 33 (UHF), shared with WMAQ-TV; Virtual: 44
- Branding: Telemundo Chicago

Programming
- Affiliations: 44.1: Telemundo; 44.2: TeleXitos

Ownership
- Owner: Telemundo Station Group; (NBC Telemundo License LLC)
- Sister stations: WMAQ-TV

History
- First air date: April 5, 1970
- Former channel numbers: Analog: 44 (UHF, 1970–2009); Digital: 45 (UHF, 2000–2018), 29 (UHF, 2018–2019)
- Former affiliations: Independent (1970–1985); ON TV (1980–1985); SIN/Univision (1985–1989)
- Call sign meaning: Essaness Theatres, founding owner

Technical information
- Licensing authority: FCC
- Facility ID: 70119
- ERP: 398 kW
- HAAT: 509 m (1,670 ft)
- Transmitter coordinates: 41°52′44.1″N 87°38′10.2″W

Links
- Public license information: Public file; LMS
- Website: www.telemundochicago.com

WSNS-TV (channel 44) is a television station in Chicago, Illinois, United States, serving as the local outlet for the Spanish-language network Telemundo. It is owned and operated by NBCUniversal's Telemundo Station Group alongside NBC outlet WMAQ-TV (channel 5). The two stations share studios at the NBC Tower on North Columbus Drive in the city's Streeterville neighborhood and broadcast from the same transmitter atop the Willis Tower in the Chicago Loop.

WSNS-TV began broadcasting in 1970. Originally specializing in the automated display of news headlines, it evolved into Chicago's third full-fledged independent station, carrying movies, local sports, and other specialty programming. This continued until 1980, when WSNS became the Chicago-area station for ON TV, an over-the-air subscription television (STV) service owned by Oak Industries, which took a minority ownership stake in the station. While ON TV was successful in Chicago and the subscription system became the second-largest in the country by total subscribers, the rise of cable television precipitated the end of the business in 1985, with WSNS-TV as the last ON TV station standing.

On July 1, 1985, the station became Chicago's first full-time Spanish-language outlet, affiliated with the Spanish International Network (Univision after 1987) and airing local news and other programming. Indiscretions from the station's STV era led to a license challenge in which the Federal Communications Commission (FCC) ruled at one point that a challenger should be awarded the channel over Video 44, the station's ownership consortium. A groundswell of support helped the station to survive and led to an $18 million settlement that kept it in business. WSNS-TV switched to Telemundo in 1989 and was the network's largest affiliate until being purchased outright in 1996. As part of NBC's purchase of Telemundo in 2002, WSNS and WMAQ became a combined operation.

== The independent years (1970–1980) ==
=== Construction and instant news ===
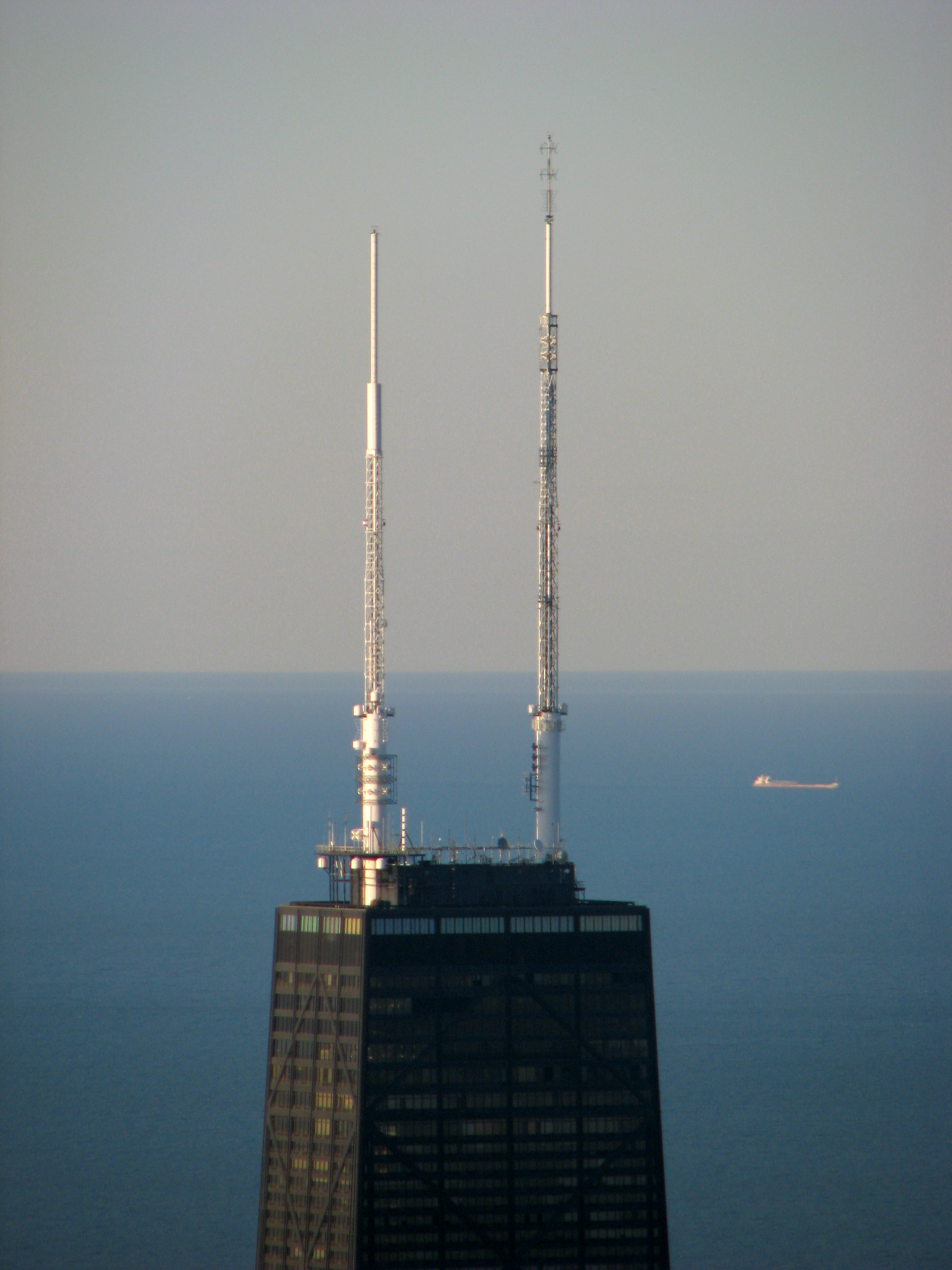
WSNS-TV initially broadcast from the east mast of the John Hancock Center, seen here in 2009.

On September 27, 1962, Essaness Theatres, (Note: Essaness was founded by Edwin Silverman and Steven Spiegel in 1929, thus the name, a phonetic rendering of "S and S".) a chain of Chicago motion picture houses, filed under the name Essaness Television Associates for a construction permit to build a new UHF television station on channel 44 in Chicago. The station would transmit from the Woods Theatre in the Loop and air programming aimed at minority groups, particularly Chicago's Black community. The Federal Communications Commission (FCC) approved the application on May 15, 1963, the second such request it had granted that month in the Chicago area after approving channel 32.

It would be the better part of a decade before channel 44 was in service. In 1965, Essaness proposed constructing instead at the Civic Opera Building on Wacker Drive. That year, it also signed for antenna space on the John Hancock Center, being the only unbuilt television station confirmed for the new skyscraper's antenna masts. In 1967, the Harriscope Broadcasting Corporation of Chicago took a stake in the licensee, which was renamed Video 44. The transmission facility was completed in late 1969, with channel 44 sharing with WBBM-TV on the east mast.

After the death of company founder Edwin Silverman that February, WSNS began broadcasting on April 5, 1970. Its format was a radical departure from that of any television station of the time: a continuous printed roundup of news headlines, sports scores, weather, and other items alongside advertising, which general manager Yale Roe called "instant news". Roe felt that it was better to offer something different than compete with existing programming as a startup. It was seven months before the station broadcast any programming featuring live personalities: an 11 p.m. hour featuring two women as newscasters (Mary Jane Odell and Linda Marshall), commentator Warner Saunders, and Chuck Collins with the Underground News, whose sponsors were described by Clarence Petersen of the Chicago Tribune as "head shops and paperback bookstores". This program ran for three years and was also syndicated to other cities; when tapes of it resurfaced in the late 1980s, viewers at a Chicago nightclub saw interviews with such figures as Jesse Jackson, Jim Croce, and Steve Goodman, as well as an interview with John Lennon and Yoko Ono in which the former explained he was moving to New York—where he was killed in 1980—"for his safety".

The format failed to inspire much loyalty, and a diverse assortment of programs appeared on WSNS-TV's air. Many were talk shows and religious programs, ranging from Rex Humbard to Paul Harvey. Several programs featured psychics. At midnight, the station aired Heart of the News, which featured anchor Linda Fuoco reading news headlines while reclining on a heart-shaped bed; a mattress company was the sponsor of the program, which Broadcasting magazine called "boudoir journalism". In November 1971, the "instant news" service ceased, with the station running enough non-automated programming to broadcast evenings and all day on Sundays.

=== Chicago's third independent ===
In 1972, Ed Morris left PBS to become the general manager of WSNS-TV. He made several changes to revamp the station with a more traditional look for an independent and told Variety that he hoped channel 44 would "not only be talked about but also watched". Under his direction, WSNS-TV began airing more classic reruns and movies—having programmed just one movie a week prior to the changes—and extended its broadcast day while removing significant portions of the previous schedule. Even more significant than the new programming was the 1973 acquisition of the television rights to Chicago White Sox baseball; the team concluded an unprofitable five-year relationship with WFLD (channel 32), with Harry Caray adding television play-by-play announcing duties to his existing radio work. They joined a programming lineup that also included 15 hours of Spanish-language fare a week, second only to WCIU-TV (channel 26).

I would have liked to emulate the efforts of other independent stations like WFLD and WGN, but the money wasn't available to make the kind of [programming buys] they did. We had to do it with mirrors and smoke, with baling wire and Scotch tape, and with a lot of good thrift.

— Ed Morris

Chicago Bulls basketball began airing on channel 44 in 1973; WSNS-TV broadcast the Bulls' full 41-game road schedule, making the Bulls the only NBA team at the time with every road game broadcast on television. That same year, channel 44 began airing World Hockey Association hockey with the Chicago Cougars, college basketball, and local professional wrestling. The Cougars and Bulls were called by Lorn Brown, who later joined Caray in the White Sox booth from 1976 to 1979. The station filled its other hours with City Colleges of Chicago telecourses, which moved in 1975 from educational station WTTW after 19 years, and the new Super Slam drawing from the Illinois Lottery. That same year, it endured a nine-week strike by NABET technicians that saw management run the station and striking workers picket the station in Popeye costumes.

In 1976, the Bulls moved their games to WGN-TV (channel 9) after experiencing falling ratings and the collapse of their TV rights deal. Three reasons were cited for the latter. The team performed poorly, finishing 24–58 in the 1975–76 season. Sponsors, one apparently thinking the viewership was predominantly Black and had "limited sales potential", were reportedly hesitant to advertise. Lastly, Olympic Broadcasting Service, which had packaged the rights, opted to exit the business and focus on its activities in the savings and loan industry. The Chicago Black Hawks took up residency at WSNS-TV two years later, marking their return to local television after not having a regular-season broadcast partner in two seasons. After the deal ended in 1980, the hockey club did not have another free broadcast television partner until 2008.

== ON TV subscription television (1980–1985) ==
=== Pre-launch ===
In November 1975, Video 44 requested authority to operate an over-the-air subscription television (STV) service over WSNS-TV. As a result of a similar request from WCIU-TV, the application sat for several years, as the FCC did not change its policy to permit more than one subscription station in large markets until 1979. Channel 44's plans rapidly shifted twice on STV. In June 1979, an agreement was reached with Oak Industries, a maker of broadcast and cable equipment and other electronics then headquartered in Crystal Lake and the owner of the ON TV operation in Los Angeles, to use Oak's technology for a subscription service on WSNS-TV, though Oak would not own the station or the STV operation.

Less than two weeks after announcing its initial accord with Oak, Video 44 instead agreed to sell 50 percent of the company to American Television and Communications (ATC), the cable TV division of Time, Inc., for more than $5 million; among the issues that would need to be resolved was that ATC used equipment from Zenith Electronics instead of the Oak stack. ATC had initially applied for channel 66 in nearby Joliet as part of preparations to launch its own STV service, which ultimately was called Preview; Chicago was a prime market for STV, as the city had no cable television. The ATC transaction, however, attracted high-powered opposition that September. Five major movie studios, led by Paramount Pictures, urged the FCC to deny the transaction, noting that Time already held a monopoly in pay TV programming markets through its ownership of the HBO pay cable service and claiming that only WSNS-TV could break that monopoly in Chicago. The next month, citing the petition to deny, Video 44 and ATC dropped the proposed sale.

After finally winning FCC approval for STV the month before, in March 1980, Video 44 initially agreed to sell 49 percent of its joint venture to two groups: Capital Cities Communications, which owned major television stations in Philadelphia and Houston, and Oak. Capital Cities bowed out, leading Oak to purchase the full 49% by itself for $7.5 million. As WSNS prepared for a subscription television future, it dropped the White Sox after eight seasons following the 1980 campaign.

=== Operation ===
We were rarely profitable in the year before we went into subscription television. We're not making a lot of money now, but we're making more than we were then.

— Ed Morris, at the station's full-time conversion to subscription television in 1982

On September 22, 1980, WSNS began offering ON TV subscription programming beginning at 7 p.m. on weekdays and 5 p.m. on weekends, with Oak supplying first-run movies, sporting events, specials, and adult programming to subscribers who paid $21.95 a month plus a $52.95 installation fee for the necessary decoder set-top box that unscrambled the programs.

A year after ON TV began broadcasting, it got competition when Spectrum, originally owned by Buford Television, began airing over Focus Broadcasting-owned WFBN (channel 66) on September 29, 1981. At the same time, WSNS extended its transmission of ON TV programming by two hours on weekdays (now starting at 5 p.m.) and by three hours on weekends (to 12 p.m.). In January 1982, WSNS began carrying ON TV for 20 hours per day, and after the repeal of the limits on STV operating hours later that year, it moved to 23 hours a day of subscription programming—resulting in the dismissal of WSNS's own sales unit and other station staffers. In June 1982, ON TV counted 120,600 subscribers in Chicagoland, making it the second-largest STV service in the country, only surpassed by Oak's enormously successful Los Angeles operation with 379,000 subscribers. General manager Ed Morris hailed the conversion to subscription operation for increasing WSNS-TV's revenue and providing a steadier source of income than ad-supported commercial operation for a station that had been "rarely profitable" in the year before the switch.

For all practical purposes, WSNS-TV has simply ceased to exist.

— Les Luchter for Broadcast Week magazine

The loss of most of WSNS's non-STV programming motivated action by a consortium of Chicago businessmen organized as Monroe Communications Corporation. Later in 1982, WSNS-TV's license came up for renewal. On November 1, 1982, Monroe filed its own application for a station on channel 44, which specified conversion to Spanish-language programming; in proposing its own station, Monroe challenged the license renewal of the existing WSNS-TV. In July 1983, the FCC designated the Monroe proposal and WSNS-TV's license renewal for comparative hearing.

=== SportsVision: Two-channel subscription TV ===
At the same time that ON TV was gaining subscribers, SportsVision International, a consortium of four Chicago sports franchises—the White Sox, Bulls, Blackhawks, and Sting—had reached a deal to set up a new subscription television station on channel 60 (the shared time WPWR/WBBS), which would carry their games. Both Oak and Buford competed for the right to manage the service, and Oak won out; ON TV subscribers could receive SportsVision for an extra $14.95 a month, and a special run of two-channel decoders was made.

SportsVision finally launched May 25, 1982, having been delayed due to issues with the new decoders and then again due to low uptake, airing as a free preview for two extra weeks.

The second STV operation, however, did not reach the subscriber base needed to maintain its viability. The overlap between subscribers of SportsVision and ON TV, which was marketed mainly to women, was low; only 10 percent of SportsVision's 21,000 residential accounts were also ON TV subscribers. By March 1983, it had 25,000 subscribers, half of the amount needed to break even, not helped by the poor performance of the White Sox in the 1982 season. In November, still at just 35,000 subscribers and losing $300,000 a month, it was announced that SportsVision would be folded into ON TV on January 1, 1984, with channel 44's STV service televising a significant number of games and SportsVision continuing as a premium cable channel in suburban areas and outside of Chicagoland; the remaining service was then sold to SportsChannel.

=== Later STV years ===
Summarized briefly, WSNS-TV broadcast no news [and] no regular local programs and effectively shut down its studios, telecast 4 to 5 percent non-entertainment programs and a drastically reduced PSA schedule at undesirable time periods—none in prime evening time. ... More important, the records reflect no support for its programming change and extensive criticism of that change by its viewers.

— Joseph Chachkin, FCC administrative law judge, rendering an initial decision against WSNS-TV in its license challenge

While subscription television had seen meteoric growth nationally, its fortunes began to reverse significantly in 1982, as a national recession limited disposable income and increasing cable television penetration meant significant subscriber erosion at many systems. By August 1983, ON TV in Chicago had dropped from its 1982 high of 120,600 subscribers to just 89,500. The system entered 1984 battered by piracy problems, which had also been cited by White Sox owner Eddie Einhorn as a reason for the end of SportsVision as a separate STV service. In January, the service's operations director estimated that, for every paying subscriber, another was pirating its programming.

ON TV received something of a reprieve in March 1984 when it was able to buy the business of Spectrum, which had been sold to United Cable, leaving Chicago with one STV service. However, subscriber losses, as they were in other cities, were continuing to accelerate. By August 1984, ON TV had 80,000 subscribers, of which 18,000 were previous clients of Spectrum. The service was also instituting program cutbacks. In November 1984, non-professional sports, children's programs and some other low-rated programming were axed to emphasize movies and a reduced schedule of events from SportsVision. By year's end, Oak had put its remaining STV services up for sale, and the total subscriber count in Chicago had fallen to 75,000.

In February 1985, as Oak's financial condition continued to worsen, it emerged that the company was taking writedowns related to the termination of its STV businesses; Burt Harris, owner of WSNS owner Harriscope, stated that he did not see the service making it to the end of the year. In March, with subscribers down to just 35,000, Oak officially announced it would discontinue its STV service on June 30, bringing to a close Oak's eight-year venture into subscription television.

February 1985 also brought an initial decision in the license challenge case from FCC administrative law judge Joseph Chachkin. He ruled in favor of Monroe, finding that Video 44 had rendered a minimal service with a lack of public affairs and local programming and studios all but shut down; however, the matter could be appealed before the full FCC. The license challenge prevented Oak from unloading its WSNS-TV ownership stake, even though Oak Industries intended to do so, as it had with its other television stations.

== Spanish-language broadcasting (1985–present) ==
=== SIN/Univision (1985–1989) ===
On July 1, 1985, nearly five years of subscription television programming on WSNS-TV was replaced by a full-time Spanish-language television station, affiliated with the Spanish International Network (renamed Univision in 1987). The two existing Spanish-language stations in Chicago either also aired other programming, as in the case of WCIU-TV, or shared their channel with another station, as did WBBS-TV. In addition, prior to 1985, the city had only one Spanish-language radio station; this was the case even though, by that time, Hispanics were estimated to comprise 19 percent of the population of the city of Chicago. The new programming was an immediate financial success. Revenue for the first year was $9 million, 20 percent above projections; a hard-hit WBBS cut back to weekend programs before disappearing later that year. Whereas previously an estimated 45 percent of Chicago Hispanics had watched channels 26 and 60, 70 percent tuned in to local Spanish-language TV with WSNS's arrival.

Meanwhile, the Monroe license challenge continued after Chachkin's initial decision. The FCC review board initially remanded the decision back to him to consider an issue raised by the challengers that some of the films telecast by WSNS as a subscription station were "obscene", including adult films with titles such as Pandora's Mirror, Kinky Ladies of Bourbon Street, and The Erotic Adventures of Zorro. The commission itself intervened to take up the First Amendment question, declaring in April 1986 that Chachkin could not consider the obscenity issue and that consideration of obscenity should be deferred to local authorities.

The case, minus the obscenity matter, then returned to the review board, which overturned Chachkin's findings in 1988 and recommended renewal of the WSNS license. It contended that the administrative law judge had focused unduly on the last 26 weeks of the three-year license term, after STV programming had increased considerably. It also found that the "renewal expectancy" factor in a comparative hearing—an incumbency advantage for Video 44—outweighed Monroe's weaker edges in media diversification and participation of ownership in station management.

=== Switch to Telemundo and license challenge settlement ===
On October 13, 1988, WSNS-TV announced that it would switch its affiliation to Telemundo after that station's affiliation agreement with Univision concluded on December 31. Two months later, on December 16, WCIU—whose contract with Telemundo was set to expire the following month—signed an affiliation agreement with Univision, returning the station to that network after four years. The two stations switched affiliations on January 10, 1989. Univision stated that WSNS and Univision had been at a financial impasse regarding new affiliation terms; WSNS general manager José Lamas noted that "Telemundo made us an offer we couldn't refuse".

The license challenge continued to be heard by the FCC and federal courts. In April 1990, a federal appeals court in Washington, D.C., overturned the full FCC's 1989 decision to renew Video 44's license to operate WSNS-TV, stating that the agency acted "arbitrarily and capriciously" in granting it—partly due to it having "improperly refused to consider" the obscenity issue—and requiring the commission to conduct further proceedings in the dispute. On September 19, 1990, the FCC denied Video 44's application to renew its license; the ruling was upheld on appeal weeks later in a 5-0 decision, and the FCC awarded a new construction permit to Monroe Communications. Video 44, Inc. subsequently appealed the decision, which Howard Shapiro, head of WCIU-TV owner Weigel Broadcasting, called "a remarkable series of circumstances that may never be duplicated again" for its relationship to changes in the composition of the FCC with the turnover of several of its members and resultant new regulatory attitudes.

Although Monroe pledged to provide an expanded array of Hispanic programming aimed at Chicagoans of Mexican and Central American heritage should its license application be approved, several Hispanic aldermen on the Chicago City Council and other community leaders objected to the FCC's decision, expressing concern that the revocation would deprive Chicago's Hispanic community of a major voice. The FCC denied Video 44's appeal of the license revocation for a second time on July 25, 1991. In the wake of this decision, the National Association of Broadcasters expelled WSNS-TV as a member, apparently thinking the revocation action took immediate effect. The license challenge finally ended after eleven years in June 1993, when Monroe Communications reached an agreement with Harriscope to drop its case against Video 44, Inc., in an $18 million settlement awarded to Monroe by Harriscope.

On November 9, 1995, Harriscope and Oak sold their combined 74.5% controlling interest in the station to Telemundo for $44.7 million, with Essaness initially retaining a 25.5% stake; the deal was approved by the FCC in February 1996. The move allowed Oak to finally exit the television industry and allowed Telemundo to buy the largest station in the network that it did not already own. Despite the sale, the 1995 arrival of a full-time Univision station in WGBO-TV (channel 66) hurt WSNS in news and total-day ratings. Within two years of starting up, WGBO had triple the audience share of WSNS among Hispanic viewers. In 1999, the station moved from the John Hancock Center to the Sears (now Willis) Tower as part of the construction of its digital facility.

=== NBC ownership ===
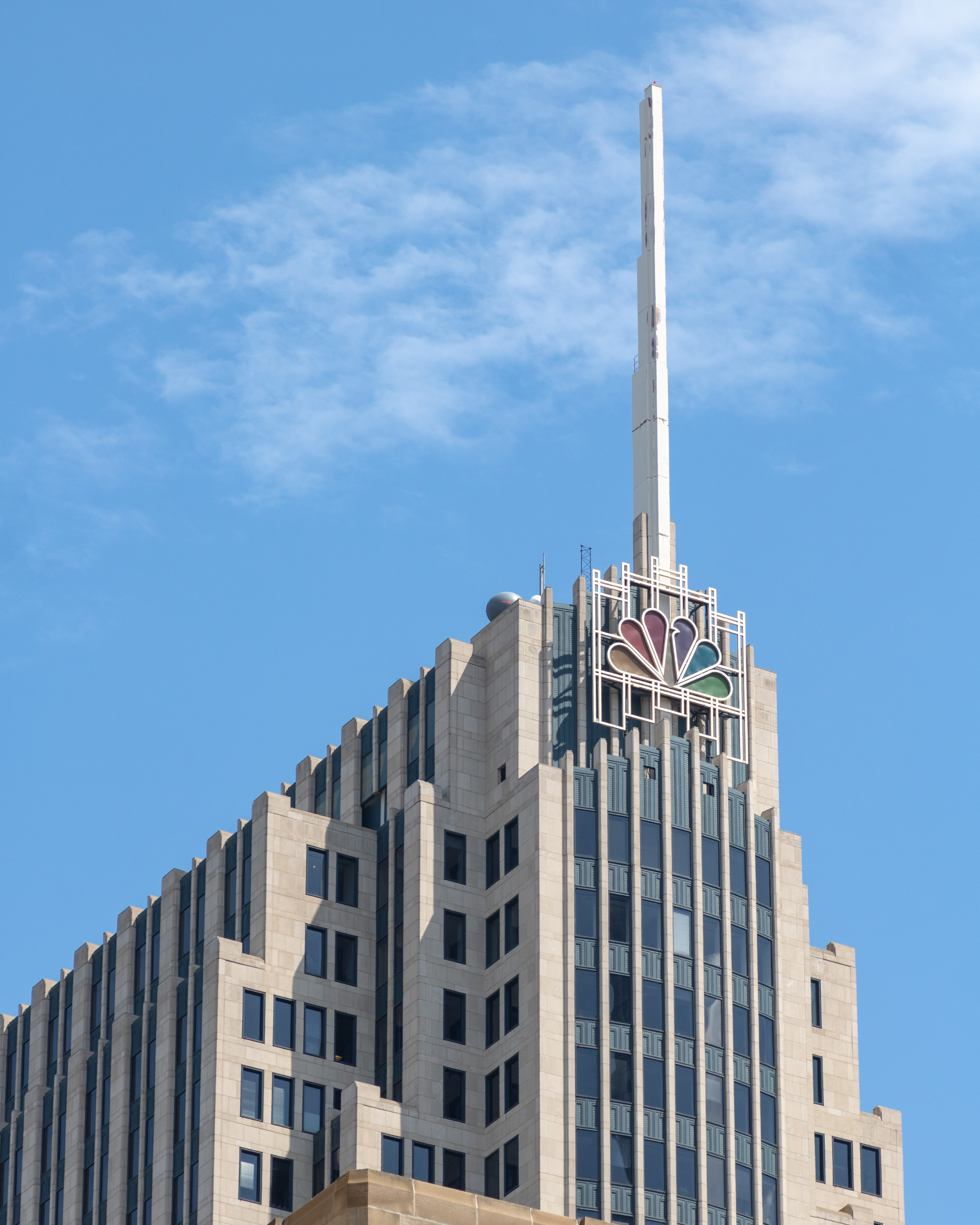
After being purchased by NBC, WSNS-TV operations moved into the NBC Tower.

When NBC purchased Telemundo in 2002, WSNS became part of the newly enlarged conglomerate, creating Chicago's first commercial television duopoly between two full-power television stations. The consolidation of NBC owned-and-operated station WMAQ-TV and WSNS-TV led to pressure on NBC to extend the same union benefits to the previously non-union Telemundo staffers that the NBC employees already enjoyed. WSNS-TV's nine anchors and reporters voted unanimously to join the American Federation of Television and Radio Artists (AFTRA, now part of SAG-AFTRA). In June 2003, WSNS migrated from its longtime studio facility on West Grant Place and merged its operations with WMAQ-TV at the NBC Tower on North Columbus Drive in the Magnificent Mile.

On November 11, 2016, WMAQ-TV's president and general manager, David Doebler, was appointed as president and general manager of WSNS-TV. In 2021, NBC tapped Kevin Cross—who had the senior vice president and general manager of NBC Sports Chicago, the co-owned regional sports network—to also serve as president and general manager of WMAQ and WSNS-TV, replacing the retiring Doebler.

== Programming ==
=== News operation ===
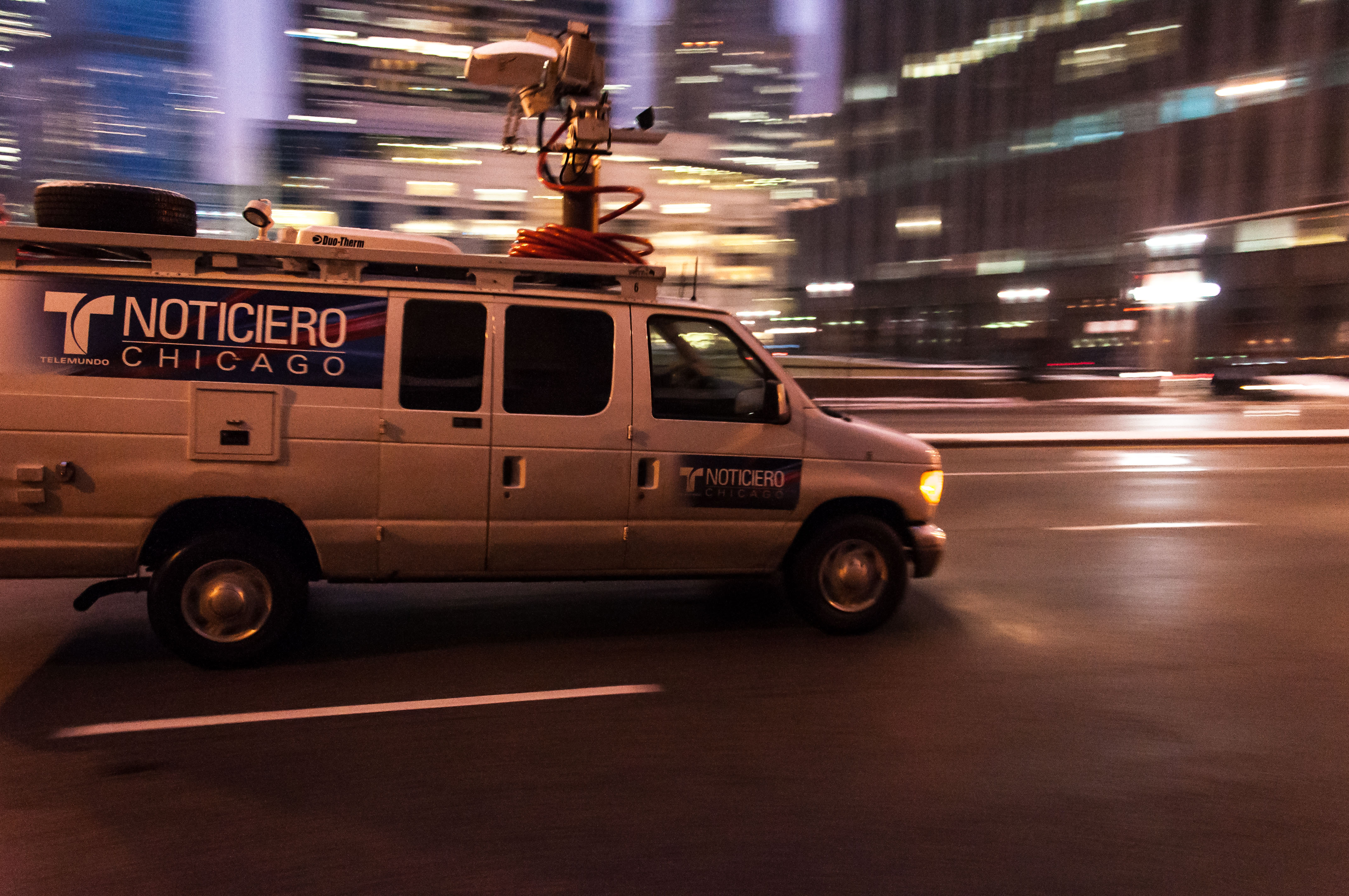
A Noticiero Telemundo Chicago news van on the streets of Chicago

After the switch to Spanish-language broadcasting, WSNS began producing local newscasts, originally under the title Noticentro 44 (Newscenter 44), on October 7, 1985. Originally airing in the early evening only, WSNS began producing late newscasts on October 17, 1994, in response to the cancellation of WCIU-TV's Spanish-language local news service. To respond to the challenge posed by WGBO, channel 44 hired personalities from Spanish-language radio, with Luisa Torres of WIND and Alberto Augusto of WOJO as anchors for the new 10 p.m. broadcast. However, Telemundo fired them in April 1996 as part of budget cuts; at the same time, the station purchased a new vehicle for electronic news gathering.

While news ratings also suffered from the entrance of WGBO, channel 44 began to show signs of ratings growth in the 2000s. In January 2001, WSNS launched its first morning newscast, Buenos Días Chicago (Good Morning Chicago); a second attempt to air a morning newscast under the title Telemundo Chicago por la Mañana was dropped in 2009 because of budget cuts. It also experimented in 2008 with a 10:30 a.m. mid-morning newscast hosted by Tsi-Tsi-Ki Félix; this evolved into an entertainment and lifestyle program known as Acceso Total. Félix, who anchored news and weather for WSNS for 11 years, left the station in November 2012.

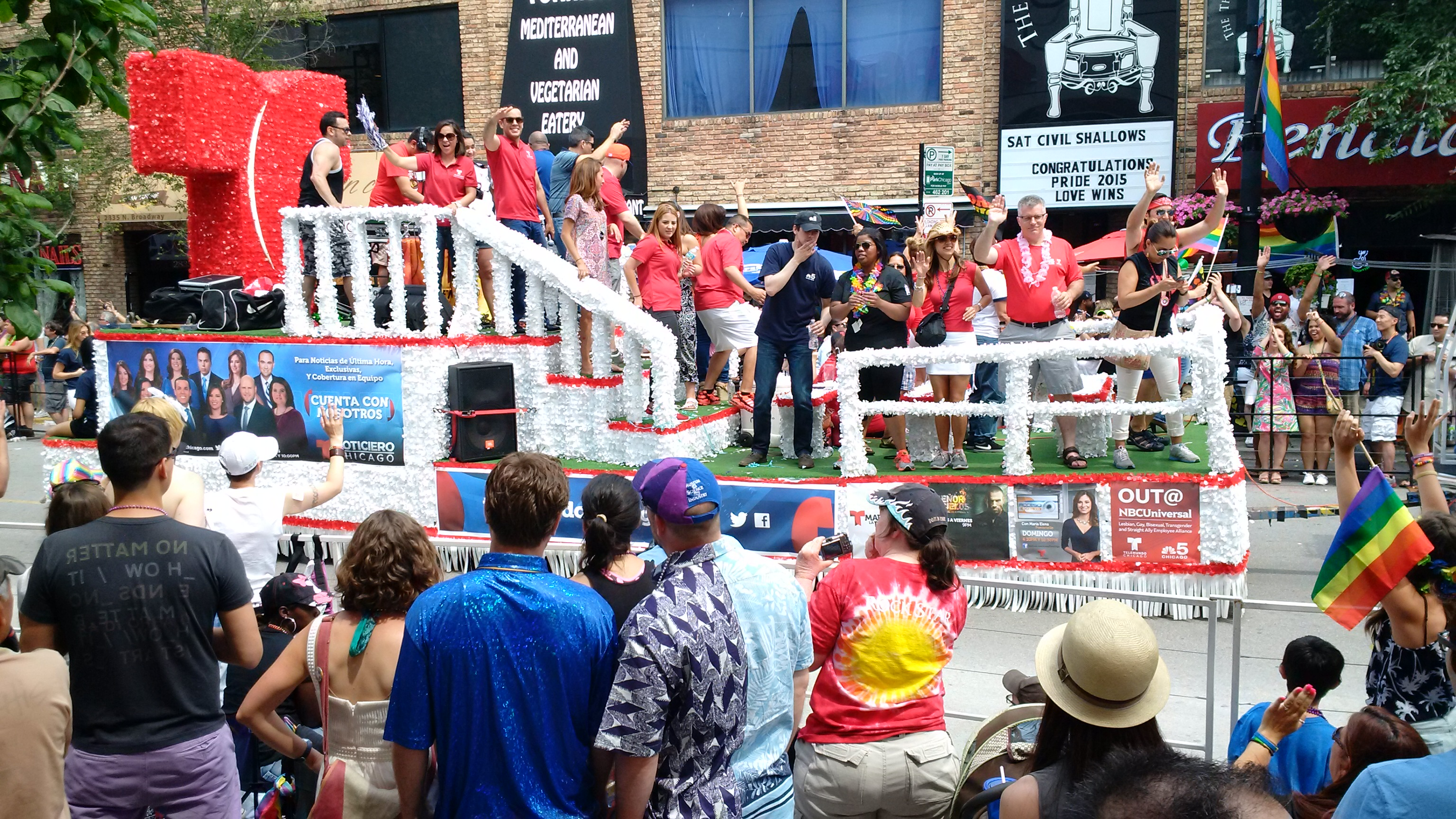
A Telemundo Chicago float at a Pride parade in 2015

In August 2013, Edna Schmidt (who previously reported for WGBO before becoming a Chicago-based correspondent for Univision Noticias) was named co-anchor of the 5 and 10 p.m. newscasts, only to be fired by the station that October after anchoring a newscast while intoxicated. Schmidt then filed a lawsuit against the station that November, charging WSNS and NBCUniversal with failing to provide "reasonable accommodation" for her alcoholism under the Americans with Disabilities Act, leading to her suspension and later dismissal. On September 18, 2014, Telemundo announced that it would expand its early-evening newscast to one hour, with the addition of a half-hour program at 4:30 p.m., as part of a groupwide news expansion across Telemundo's owned-and-operated stations. A 4 p.m. half-hour was added in 2016, again as part of a national expansion in the group. Weekend newscasts were added in 2017, and a midday newscast was introduced in January 2018 in Chicago and nine other cities.

On June 29, 2015, as part of a national rollout, WSNS launched a consumer investigative unit under the Telemundo Responde (Telemundo Responds) banner; the unit was originally headed by chief investigative reporter Alba Mendiola, who joined the station as a general assignment reporter in 2001 and formerly hosted Enfoque Chicago, the station's public affairs program.

=== Sports programming ===
Though sporting events are less prevalent on its schedule than when it was an English-language station, WSNS-TV has occasionally broadcast local sports. Chicago Sting indoor soccer was telecast on WSNS-TV in 1986. More recently, the station has been part of media rights deals with WMAQ-TV. As part of a five-year broadcast partnership between WMAQ-TV and the Chicago Bears, WSNS aired Spanish-language broadcasts of the Bears' preseason football games from 2003 to 2007. It was the first time that Bears preseason games had been televised in Spanish. After five years, the Bears moved their preseason games in English from WMAQ to WFLD. As part of another rights deal, WSNS-TV began broadcasting the Chicago Marathon in 2017; WMAQ had been airing the marathon continuously since 2008. The marathon had previously aired on channel 44 in 2002.

== Technical information and subchannels ==
WMAQ-TV and WSNS-TV transmit using WMAQ-TV's spectrum from an antenna atop the Willis Tower. The stations' signals are multiplexed:

Subchannels of WMAQ-TV and WSNS-TV
License	Subchannel	Res.	Short name	Programming
WMAQ-TV	5.1	1080i	NBC5	NBC
WMAQ-TV	5.2	480i	COZI	Cozi TV
WMAQ-TV	5.3	480i	CRIMES	NBC True CRMZ
WMAQ-TV	5.4	480i	OXYGEN	Oxygen
WMAQ-TV	2.4	480i	365BLK	365BLK (WBBM-TV)
WSNS-TV	44.1	1080i	WSNS-HD	Telemundo
WSNS-TV	44.2	480i	T-XITOS	TeleXitos (4:3)

Broadcast on behalf of another station

Subchannel broadcast with MPEG-4 video

=== Analog-to-digital conversion ===
WSNS-TV shut down its analog signal, over UHF channel 44, on June 12, 2009, the official date on which full-power television stations in the United States transitioned from analog to digital broadcasts under federal mandate. The station's digital signal continued to broadcast on its pre-transition UHF channel 45, using virtual channel 44.

=== Spectrum reallocation ===
In 2017, NBC sold WSNS-TV's spectrum in the FCC's spectrum reallocation auction, fetching $141.7 million. WSNS-TV ceased broadcasting on UHF digital channel 45 on April 23, 2018, and began sharing spectrum with WMAQ-TV on channel 29.
