= Super TV (American TV channel) =

American subscription television service

- Country: United States
- Broadcast area: Washington, D.C., Capital and central regions of Maryland and northern Virginia

Programming
- Language(s): English

Ownership
- Owner: Subscription Television of Greater Washington, Inc.

History
- Launched: November 1, 1981; 43 years ago
- Closed: March 31, 1986; 38 years ago

Super TV was an American subscription television service operating in the Washington, D.C., and Baltimore metropolitan areas. that was owned by Subscription Television of Greater Washington, Inc. It was an early form of subscription television that was offered to prospective subscribers as either a standalone service to those that did not have access to cable television-originated premium services (such as HBO and Showtime), or as an additional viewing alternative thereto.

Super TV broadcast on two television stations: WCQR channel 50 in Washington, D.C., from 1981 to 1985, and WNUV channel 54 in Baltimore, from 1982 to 1986.

== History ==
Super TV was launched by Subscription Television of Greater Washington—a joint venture of Field Enterprises and Clint Murchison Jr.—and began broadcasting on WCQR, a new-to-air station, when it signed on November 1, 1981. The company had a rough start out of the gate: a computer problem caused some 20 percent of its 5,000 customers in the first month to not receive full service, while customer service phone lines were jammed. Typical of subscription services, Super TV programmed movies, sports, and special events, as well as an optional Night Life adult package.

Super TV began broadcasting over another new station on July 1, 1982, when Baltimore's WNUV began broadcasting. Within a month, the service had 10,000 Baltimore subscribers in addition to 45,000 in its Washington market. One of the service's major selling points was a package of 16 Baltimore Orioles baseball games, announced by Ted Patterson and Rex Barney; however, interest in the 16-game package waned when Home Team Sports launched as a cable channel in 1984, and Super TV dropped it after two years when HTS started up.

The service reached its peak in subscribers in 1983: 85,000 subscribers, with 30,000 of those in Baltimore. Unlike many similar services, Super TV maintained a part-time schedule throughout its entire existence, never switching to a 24-hour schedule; it broadcast Monday through Fridays from 7:00 p.m. to 2:00 a.m. and from 5:00 p.m. to 2:00 a.m. on weekends.

As STV declined nationwide, Super TV began to lose subscribers, though delays in wiring Baltimore for cable gave the service a reprieve. The owner of WNUV, the Baltimore station, would state that he realized Super TV would be going out of business as early as January 1984; later that year, he began a campaign to raise the profile of the station outside of Super TV programming. After the sale of WCQR, Super TV ceased programming on the station on December 31, 1985; the station itself was relaunched as WFTY on the first day of 1986. While Super TV was able to retune most of its customers' equipment to receive WNUV instead, some viewers in northern Virginia and areas far from the WNUV transmitter were not able to continue. However, the number of subscribers continued to fall rapidly, from 28,000 in late 1985 to 14,000 in early 1986. As a result of the company's failure and WNUV's desire to become a full-time commercial independent, Super TV broadcast for the last time on March 31, 1986.

== Technology ==
The Zenith SSAVI (sync suppression and video inversion) was used to decode the signal; however, it had no external controls other than a small chrome button atop the decoder box to select between standard television signals or Super TV. In a then-pioneering effort at thwarting piracy, the station could address each box individually to authorize decoding of programs, including one-time pay-per-view broadcasts or adult program options. In addition, to defeat simple home-engineer descrambling techniques, video inversion was done selectively, often when the video frame was light overall, causing the scrambled picture to retain in a darker tint than the elevated sync pulses. In certain cases, video was inverted on alternate frames. The audio transmitted on the standard audio channel was a "barker" announcement, informing would-be customers that Super TV was a scrambled service and required a subscription to view its content. However, during selected concert presentations, local radio stations such as WWDC and WGAY simulcast the audio of SuperTV in stereo and unscrambled, unintentionally providing a legal, free way to receive the programming.

The monaural audio used for Super TV's film broadcasts was transmitted on a subcarrier, which would later be used to transmit the difference signal of multichannel television sound after 1984. Until the first MTS sets became available in 1985, most conventional television sets could not decode the audio; however, shortly afterward, the barker channel would be transmitted on the right audio channel and the monaural program audio feed would transmit on the left.

== See also ==
- ONTV – an UHF subscription service that served Chicago, Cincinnati, Dallas/Fort Worth, Detroit, Fort Lauderdale, Phoenix, Salem/Portland and San Francisco.
- PRISM – an UHF subscription service that served Southeastern Pennsylvania, Southern New Jersey, Delaware and the Delmarva Peninsula.
- SelecTV – a terrestrial subscription service that served Los Angeles, Milwaukee and Philadelphia and later the Wometco Home Theater territories after WHT ceased its own programming.
- Spectrum – a terrestrial subscription service that served Chicago and was a direct competitor to On-TV.
- Wometco Home Theater – an UHF subscription service that served New York City, Northern and Central New Jersey, Long Island and Fairfield County, Connecticut.
