= WSCV =

Television station in Fort Lauderdale, Florida

- Fort Lauderdale–Miami–; West Palm Beach, Florida; United States
- City: Fort Lauderdale, Florida
- Channels: Digital: 30 (UHF); Virtual: 51
- Branding: Telemundo 51; Noticiero Telemundo 51 (newscasts)

Programming
- Affiliations: 51.1: Telemundo; 51.2: TeleXitos; 51.4: Telemundo Palm Beach

Ownership
- Owner: Telemundo Station Group; (NBC Telemundo License LLC)
- Sister stations: WTVJ

History
- First air date: December 6, 1968
- Former call signs: WSMS-TV (1968–1970); WKID (1972–1984)
- Former channel numbers: Analog: 51 (UHF, 1968–2009); Digital: 52 (UHF, 2003–2009)
- Former affiliations: Independent (1968–1970, 1972–1987); Dark (1970–1972); ON TV (1980–1984); FNN (1981–1984)
- Call sign meaning: Similar sound in Spanish to "ese se ve", "that one is seen"

Technical information
- Licensing authority: FCC
- Facility ID: 64971
- ERP: 1,000 kW
- HAAT: 304 m (997 ft)
- Transmitter coordinates: 25°59′10.0″N 80°11′36.3″W

Links
- Public license information: Public file; LMS
- Website: www.telemundo51.com

WSCV (channel 51) is a television station licensed to Fort Lauderdale, Florida, United States, serving as the Telemundo outlet for the Miami area. It is one of two flagship stations of the Spanish-language network (the other being WNJU in the New York City market). WSCV is owned and operated by NBCUniversal's Telemundo Station Group alongside NBC station WTVJ (channel 6). The two stations share studios on Southwest 27th Street in Miramar; WSCV's transmitter is located in Pembroke Park, Florida. The station also serves as the de facto Telemundo outlet for the West Palm Beach market, as that area does not have a Telemundo station of its own.

Channel 51 in Fort Lauderdale first went on the air in 1968. It operated as a primarily English-language independent station as WSMS-TV from 1968 to 1970 and as WKID from 1972 to 1980. From 1980 to 1984, the station primarily broadcast the ON TV subscription service until its owner, Oak Communications, sold it to John Blair & Co., which relaunched it the next year as Spanish-language WSCV. It was one of Telemundo's charter stations in 1987 and has since experienced ratings increases and expanded its local news offerings.

== History ==
=== WSMS-TV ===
The construction permit for channel 51 was awarded in 1965, but channel 51 did not begin broadcasting until December 6, 1968, as WSMS-TV. The Broward Broadcasting Company, owned by attorney Paris G. Singer, was the original permit holder. The call letters had been selected to mean "Where Sun Meets Sea"; a proposed sister station for Tampa would have been WTSS, for "Where The Sun Sets". Delayed from a planned October 1 start due to bad weather, WSMS was the first station in Fort Lauderdale in 12 years, operating from its studios on Federal Highway. The station aired syndicated programming as well as all-color local news and sports, alongside other local productions including Romper Room, the afternoon interview show Talk About Town and the cartoon show Capt'n' Zero, plus local stock market reports. Channel 51's news moved to 10 p.m. in July 1969, making it the only local newscast in that time slot in South Florida.

Engineering difficulties forced WSMS-TV to suspend operations on February 6, 1970; while local news reports only mentioned engineering problems, in its request for silence with the Federal Communications Commission (FCC), WSMS-TV also cited financial difficulties. In April, the station announced it would remain off air, citing the financial condition of Gold Coast Telecasting, the licensee.

=== WKID ===
In 1971, a buyer appeared for the silent television station. A subsidiary of Recreation Corporation of America (RCA), owner of the Pirates World amusement park in Dania, filed to acquire channel 51; Singer became an officer in the new company. The new owners changed the call letters to WKID and planned to target a youth audience, with the studios to be at Pirates World. Though one objection was made to RCA's plans, by Hank Zinkil—a state representative and former mayor of Hollywood attempting to exaggerate that Pirates World had been "the source of great controversy" due to rock concerts which required consistent crowd control, and a drug dealing site—the FCC dismissed Zinkil's challenge. From a new 1,049-foot (320 m) tower affording market-wide coverage, WKID returned to the air on February 14, 1972.

Pirates World closed in December 1973 after the opening of Walt Disney World sapped its customer base. The amusement park site became an eyesore with 48 abandoned buildings, amidst which WKID continued to operate through 1975. On the night of February 24, two bombs went off at the studios in Dania and a production office the station leased in Miami; a Cuban exile group took credit, blaming WKID's policy of rapprochement with communist Cuba in its Spanish-language programming. Licensee Channel 51, Inc., went bankrupt in March, and Pirates World with the WKID studio was condemned in September. Channel 51 moved the next month to temporary quarters in Pembroke Park as WKID was acquired by an investment group headed by Bill Johns and Alvin Koenig in 1976; the group became known as CB TV Corp. in 1977. Johns and Koenig had already been operating the station on RCA's behalf since 1972.

In the 1970s, WKID was the second-largest source of Spanish-language television programming in South Florida, providing the only prime time shows not being aired on WLTV. In the evening hours in 1977, it leased out airtime to Latin Network, which programmed "TV Sol", complete with news and entertainment programs in Spanish. During this era, cable providers that carried competing independent WCIX outside of the Miami market, especially in the Tampa and Orlando areas, carried WKID during the overnight hours, after WCIX signed off for the night; channel 51 broadcast The All Night Show, a campy mix of movies hosted by Dave Dixon, to this audience. WKID-TV was also among the first broadcast outlets for what would become the Christian Television Network, as the network purchased a block of evening airtime every night on channel 51 prior to the establishment of its first station, WCLF in Tampa.

In 1980, CB TV Corp. sold WKID for $4.1 million to the Oak Communications subsidiary of Oak Industries, a cable television equipment manufacturer. Oak was also the owner of ON TV, a subscription television (STV) service that WKID began carrying during the evening hours that January. ON TV could only be viewed for a monthly fee and required a set-top decoder box and outdoor antenna for adequate reception. The station's advertiser-supported programming during this period included daytime business news, first from The Market Report Corporation and beginning in 1981 from the Financial News Network; a horse racing show hosted by Bob Savage in the early evening; and the overnight movies, which former owner Johns continued to produce for channel 51. Subscription service from ON TV initially commenced at 7 p.m. Monday through Friday and at 10 a.m. on Saturdays and Sundays, expanding in 1982 to a 4 p.m. start. With the expansion of cable television in the Miami area, ON TV proved to be an ill-fated venture; by July 1984, when it laid off half its staff, subscriptions had fallen from a 1982 high of 44,700 to 28,500, making it the smallest of Oak's STV operations at the time.

=== WSCV ===
What we saw was that there was one TV station serving a market of close to one million people, compared to eight radio stations.

— Julio Rumbaut

Oak's financial difficulties and the failure of ON TV motivated the company to sell WKID. At the end of July 1984, Oak announced that it had sold the station to John Blair & Co. for $17.75 million; the new buyers intended to program it as a Spanish-language station. Financial News Network programming ceased in October 1984. Blair, led by Cuban-American media entrepreneur Julio Rumbaut, completed the acquisition in December. Channel 51 then went off the air as Blair prepared to implement the station's relaunch as WSCV, south Florida's second Spanish-language television station. The new call letters, when pronounced in Spanish, read "Doble-U Ese Se Ve" (which is translated into English as "that one is seen").

The launch took longer than expected due to transmitter troubles; WSCV finally launched on June 2, 1985. The new WSCV positioned its programming as a local, independent Miami-targeted alternative to the Mexican-dominated Spanish International Network (now Univision) and its station WLTV (channel 23), with a program hosted by Rolando Barral as part of its charter lineup. (Barral left within months to return to WLTV.) Reflecting the market it aimed to serve, the station played both the United States and Cuban national anthems at sign-on and sign-off; its logo incorporated features of the Cuban flag. Another feature in the station's early months were Major League Baseball telecasts; announcers in the channel 51 studio produced Spanish-language commentary for games of the Baltimore Orioles and other teams.

In 1986, the Reliance Group acquired WSCV and WKAQ-TV in San Juan, Puerto Rico, from John Blair & Co., which was paid $300 million to thwart a hostile takeover. The year before, Reliance had purchased Oak's Los Angeles station, KBSC-TV, and relaunched it as Spanish-language KVEA—much like WSCV, the first competition to a long-running SIN station in a large Hispanic market. In October 1986, Reliance then bought WNJU serving the New York City area. On January 12, 1987, the new stations were integrated into one network: Telemundo, supplying additional programming and national news coverage.

While Rumbaut had done much to build WSCV in the early years of what he called "the World Series of Spanish television", his exit would be acrimonious. In February 1988, WSCV was the only Telemundo station (of a total of nine) to air a speech by President Ronald Reagan about aid to the Contras, after the news staff petitioned Rumbaut to air the address. The move was poorly received by the network; after a meeting in New York, he presented his resignation. Roberto Rodríguez Tejera then attempted to present editorials relating to Rumbaut's resignation; on orders from the Telemundo Group, engineers shut the station's signal off during the editorial, infuriating staffers. He was replaced by Alfredo Durán, formerly of WLTV. Later that year, the station moved news production from its original facilities in Hollywood to Telemundo's Hialeah headquarters, coinciding with a top-to-bottom station relaunch; offices and other station functions followed suit in 1990. Durán would leave in 1991, seeking new career challenges. The next year, José Cancela jumped from Univision, at the time in a process of a sale, to run WSCV.

On October 11, 2001, NBC acquired the Telemundo network, including WSCV, from Sony and Liberty Media for $1.98 billion (increasing to $2.7 billion by the sale's closure) and the assumption of $700 million in debt, in an equal cash and stock split by NBC's then-parent General Electric. The acquisition was finalized on April 12, 2002, making WSCV part of a duopoly with NBC's WTVJ. WSCV and WTVJ were the first stations to be fully integrated among the several duopolies the deal produced; the WTVJ studio center in Miramar had been designed when NBC was considering purchasing another Spanish-language station, facilitating some of the task. In 2020, WSCV's general manager assumed oversight of WTVJ after its general manager retired.

== News operation ==
Local news was on WSCV's slate from the moment it relaunched in 1985. The station initially aired a 6 p.m. and 10 p.m. local newscast, anchored by Cuban-born Lucy Pereda and news director Eduardo Arango. Pereda left before the end of 1985 to work for the Spanish International Network (going on to host Mundo Latino, its first national morning show), while Arango was ousted in early 1986 over differences in philosophy with Rumbaut. However, the presence of WSCV's 10 p.m. news, an hour before WLTV's, led the latter station to move up its newscast to match. As with the station in general, the news on WSCV was positioned as "Cuban" to the more Mexican-influenced WLTV. Rafael Orizondo, who replaced Arango in an interim capacity, said at a 1986 forum, "Our newscasts are designed for the Cuban community, not for the Hispanic community. We emphasize the Cuban, and to call Fidel Castro a dictator and say he is an assassin does not cost us any credibility." In late 1986, WSCV hired María Montoya, a former actress who had arrived in Miami as part of the Mariel boatlift of 1980, and Ambrosio Hernández, who had worked at several radio stations in Chicago, to complement the team.

Upon Alfredo Durán becoming general manager in 1988, aggressive moves were made to improve the ratings. The newscast was moved back from 11 p.m., where it had been relocated earlier in the year, to 10. Durán lured well-known WLTV reporter Alina Mayo Azze to WSCV. Her hiring was soon eclipsed by another with romantic overtones; Durán was in a relationship with Leticia Callava, the main female anchor at WLTV and described by Tom Jicha of The Miami News as "to Spanish-language news what Ann Bishop is to English-language news". Despite claiming that Callava was not about to jump stations in May, when Callava was demoted by WLTV after Durán's move, she left that station and signed with WSCV in August, teaming with Mayo Azze to become the first two-woman anchor pairing on Spanish-language television in Miami on a relaunched Noticentro 51 (Newscenter 51). Durán also toned down the Cuban emphasis of channel 51, stripping the Cuban flag colors from the logo and asking weather presenter Ángel Martín to stop referring to Cuba as "that beautiful land where we were born".

The move, which helped to lift WSCV's ratings slightly, escalated Miami's Spanish-language news war: Hernández defected to a rebuilding WLTV. When Mayo Azze left in 1990, she was replaced on the anchor desk by Argentine news anchor Nicolas Kasanzew, who became famous covering the Falklands War (Spanish: Guerra de las Malvinas/Guerra del Atlántico Sur) for the state-run network ATC. Kasanzew was demoted to a reporter two years later as part of a major shakeup in which three newscasters were fired and news production was suspended for a week as the station readied a "clean slate", with Callava the only remaining anchor. At the time, WLTV was still beating WSCV two-to-one in the evening news ratings race. This continued until Hernández returned to WSCV in early 1993.

Montoya returned to WSCV in 1999 when the station began to expand its local news with the first Spanish-language midday newscast in the country. Two years later, WSCV expanded to morning news for the first time, debuting the 6 a.m. news hour Primera Edición (First Edition) as part of a national strategy to add local morning newscasts. Weekend news followed that September. After being told that management desired to replace her on the evening news with Montoya, Callava left WSCV in late 2001 after 13 years. While WLTV still led in news ratings into the 2000s, WSCV steadily increased its share of the marketplace.

Despite changes in its anchor lineup—Montoya would depart WSCV in 2013, while Hernández departed in 2015 to rejoin Univision—WSCV added several new newscasts in the 2010s as part of national local news expansions across the Telemundo station group. A 5:30 p.m. show debuted at WSCV and 13 other Telemundo stations in 2014, followed by a 5 p.m. newscast in 2016. Steady improvement led to ratings leadership. By 2022, WSCV was the leading station in total households and the 25–54 news demo in the morning, early evening, and late news, regardless of language.

== Technical information and subchannels ==
The station's signal, broadcast from a tower in Pembroke Park, is multiplexed and includes three of the four subchannels offered by WTVJ, which converted to ATSC 3.0 (NextGen TV) broadcast in January 2023. WSCV's main subchannel is in turn offered on the WTVJ multiplex.

Subchannels of WSCV
Subchannel	Res.	Short name	Programming
51.1	1080i	WSCV	Telemundo
51.2	480i	Exitos	TeleXitos
51.4	480i	WSCV-PB	Version of main feed with commercials for the West Palm Beach area
6.1	1080i	WTVJ	NBC (WTVJ)
6.2	480i	COZI TV	Cozi TV (WTVJ)
6.3	480i	AMCRIME	NBC True CRMZ (WTVJ)

Broadcast on behalf of another station

=== Analog-to-digital conversion ===
WSCV ended programming on its analog signal, on UHF channel 51, on June 12, 2009, the official date on which full-power television stations in the United States transitioned from analog to digital broadcasts under federal mandate. The station's digital signal moved from its pre-transition UHF channel 52, which was among the high band UHF channels (52-69) that were removed from broadcasting use as a result of the transition, to channel 30, continuing to use virtual channel 51.
