= Spectrum (TV channel) =

American subscription television service

- Country: United States
- Broadcast area: Chicago; Minneapolis–St. Paul
- Headquarters: Cincinnati, Ohio

Programming
- Language: English

Ownership
- Owner: Home Entertainment Network (80% United Cable, 20% Buford Television)

History
- Launched: September 29, 1981
- Closed: October 6, 1985

Spectrum was an American subscription television channel that was owned and operated by United Cable. Existing during the early 1980s, the service was available in the Chicago and Minneapolis–St. Paul metropolitan areas. It was also available in some areas of Alaska, such as Fairbanks.

United Cable, which owned a majority stake in Spectrum through its Home Entertainment Network division, also owned a third STV operation in the Cincinnati and Dayton market, which used the ON TV brand name under license; United had purchased a majority share in Home Entertainment Network from original owners Buford Television for a reported $20 million in 1982.

== History ==
Spectrum began operating in Chicago on September 29, 1981, on a new television station, WFBN (channel 66), owned by Focus Broadcasting. By early 1983, Spectrum there had 60,000 subscribers—in comparison to ON TV's 125,000—and had not turned a profit since its inception.

United Cable launched Spectrum in the Twin Cities on a new station, KTMA, on September 22, 1982, making it one of the later subscription television startups. It competed with TVQ, which operated a microwave distribution system of HBO to some 15,000 subscribers. The new service quickly secured valuable programming when it struck a deal to televise Minnesota Twins baseball and Minnesota North Stars hockey home games: the entire North Stars home slate and 50 Twins home games, packaged as "Spectrum Sports"—available for $19.95 a month or $29.90 along with the Spectrum movie service. At its peak, in May 1983, the service attracted 27,000 Twin Cities subscribers, making it the most successful of United Cable's three STV operations. Even then, United Cable was laying off 55 staff, cutting costs, and considering outsourcing its movie programming to Oak Industries, owners of ON TV. Three months later, the company wrote down the Home Entertainment Network division and put the three STV systems on the market.

In Chicago, Spectrum encountered technical issues with their broadcast signal. WFBN's broadcast from the eastern mast atop the John Hancock Center in the Chicago Loop was prone to multipath interference caused by the large number of high rise buildings in the area. The interference resulted in mediocre to poor quality pictures, and caused problems with Spectrum's set top descramblers. By 1983, in the face of cable television entering the Chicago market and the economic recession, Spectrum announced its intent to go out of business. United Cable finally discontinued the service in February 1984 and sold its subscriber base to Oak Industries and ON TV; ON TV took over Spectrum programming on March 1, 1984, while subscribers were converted to Oak's equipment. At the time of the sale, there were 28,000 Spectrum subscribers, while ON TV had fallen to 84,000. WFBN then broadcast music videos for the summer before relaunching as a general-entertainment independent that fall.

As a sports service, Spectrum in the Twin Cities never reached the intended subscriber figures, prompting profits to fall far short of expectations for the Twins. Further, a federal judge had ruled against the Twins and North Stars pooling their broadcast rights in the Spectrum deal after WCCO-TV sued on antitrust charges. (Sports telecasts continued while the case was being appealed; after Spectrum's demise, the United States Court of Appeals for the Eighth Circuit found in the teams' favor.) In August 1985, the Twins and North Stars opted not to renew their Spectrum rights deal, a decision that sounded the death knell for the service—already down to just 13,000 subscribers; the movie service ended September 29, 1985, while Spectrum Sports concluded with the final game of the Twins season on October 6.

== See also ==
- PRISM, an over-the-air and cable television subscription service that served Southeastern Pennsylvania, Southern New Jersey, Delaware and the Delmarva Peninsula.
- SelecTV, an over-the-air subscription service that served Los Angeles, Milwaukee and Philadelphia and later the Wometco Home Theater territories after WHT ceased its own programming.
- SuperTV, an over-the-air subscription service that served Washington, D.C., the Capital and Central regions of Maryland and Northern Virginia.
- Wometco Home Theater – an over-the-air subscription service that served New York City, Northern and Central New Jersey, Long Island and Fairfield County, Connecticut.
