= Tsi-Tsi-Ki Félix =

American broadcaster

- Born: February 25, 1979 (age 47); Michoacán, México
- Occupation: Broadcaster

Tsi-Tsi-Ki Félix is an Mexican-American broadcaster, currently leading the daily news and a Sunday political talk show on Entravision. Formerly she was the lead anchor of Telemundo Chicago's WSNS-TV 5 p.m. and 10 p.m. news broadcasts.

== Biography ==
Félix is a native of Michoacán, Mexico and a graduate of DePaul University in Chicago, Illinois.

In 2010 Félix hosted "The Feminine Edge: You Don't Have to be One of the 'Boys' to Succeed" at The Executives' Club of Chicago

She was previously married to Rafael Romo, the former WBBM-TV and WGBO-TV reporter/anchor, who currently works for CNN. He is credited for getting Félix her start in Chicago television news. The two have since divorced.

== Television programs ==
- Abriendo Puertas (host)
- Noticiero Telemundo Chicago por la Manaña
- Noticero Telemundo Chicago (anchor, 2007-2012)
- Hablando Claro (host, 2010-?)
- Perspectiva Nacional
