= SelecTV (American TV channel) =

American subscription television service

- Country: United States
- Broadcast area: Nationwide (available in select areas)

Programming
- Language: English

Ownership
- Owner: Starion Entertainment

History
- Launched: July 23, 1978; 48 years ago
- Closed: March 31, 1989; 37 years ago (10 years, 251 days)

SelecTV was an American subscription television service that was formed in 1976 and first began broadcasting in 1978; the service focused entirely on televising movies, and was shut down in 1989.

As with other subscription television systems, SelecTV was transmitted via scrambled signal from a local UHF television station (it later became a satellite service as well). Unlike its competitors, it originally allowed subscribers to pay only for programs "selected" during the month, with the first several minutes free (the decoder box included a phone hook-up to transmit information back to the billing office); it later switched to a flat fee.

== History ==
Original logo of SelecTV, used from 1978 to 1980

SelecTV began broadcasting July 23, 1978, on KWHY-TV (channel 22) in Los Angeles. By November, SelecTV had signed up 5,000 subscribers. The service expanded to Milwaukee on WCGV (channel 24) on June 27, 1980, and it began broadcasting to Philadelphia over WWSG-TV (channel 57)—a new-to-air station—on June 15, 1981.

In 1981, Burt Harris of Harriscope and SelecTV teamed up to buy KWHY-TV from Coast Television for $5.3 million; SelecTV opted to exercise an option to buy channel 22 after Coast continually opposed the airing of R-rated movies by SelecTV. Late that year, SelecTV's subscriber base peaked at 125,000. In 1983, the service went national via satellite; that same year, SelecTV lost WWSG and its 11,000 Philadelphia subscribers when that station switched to airing PRISM, a regional subscription channel that previously was cable-only.

The Milwaukee system was shut down in July 1984, leaving SelecTV operating over-the-air only in Los Angeles and on a low-power television station in McComb, Mississippi, W36AC, which began broadcasting SelecTV programming in May 1984 but did not air its X-rated movies. After a year of speculation and failure of the first round of talks, SelecTV acquired ONTV's Los Angeles operations in February 1985 from Oak Industries; some sports events were broadcast on the combined service, which had some 215,000 subscribers. Most of those events were simulcast from the then-recently launched regional sports network Prime Ticket. During this time, SelecTV also was a sustaining service for other subscription systems, such as WHT (the former Wometco Home Theater).

In 1986, SelecTV Entertainment Corporation, which was spun off from its parent, SelecTV of California, merged with home video distributor King of Video, who operated Paragon Video Productions to form a new company that provided pay TV, TVRO programming and home video products, and the original owners of STEC would own 70% of the newly combined company, and remained in control.

SelecTV was acquired by Telstar in January 1987. However, Telstar was unable to turn the company around. As 1988 progressed, it entered several entanglements with program suppliers, causing a decline in the quality of the service and causing subscribers to abandon SelecTV. The Mississippi low-power station dropped the service, having never made a profit, and converted to conventional operation as a community-oriented independent.

Continued erosion of the service's subscriber base led KWHY to start preparing a transition to Spanish-language programming during prime time. SelecTV ceased operating over KWHY after more than a decade of operations on March 31, 1989, having reached a deal to conclude the month after going into bankruptcy; one night (Monday, March 20), KWHY did not air SelecTV because the station had not been paid.

After losing KWHY, the company announced its switch to an MMDS microwave system known as "SuperselecTV". This never transpired. Instead, SelecTV yielded on satellite to co-owned Starion Premiere Cinema, which itself folded January 31, 1991.

== Programming ==
SelecTV ident used in the mid-1980s

Unlike rival service ON TV, SelecTV specialized in airing movies. It also showcased World Championship Boxing matches. These included the Welterweight championship fight between Roberto Duran and Sugar Ray Leonard in June 1980. Their rematch in November of 1980 was also shown. Other fights were the WBC Heavyweight Championship between Larry Holmes and Muhammad Ali in October, 1980. And the Undisputed Welterweight Championship fight between Sugar Ray Leonard and Thomas Hearns in September 1981. Also, the huge mega-fight for the WBC Heavyweight Championship between Larry Holmes and Gerry Cooney was on Select TV in June 1982. The last boxing match showed was Thomas Hearns vs.Roberto Duran for the WBC Super Welterweight Championship in June 1984. Subscribers would have to call SelecTV to get a code to order the fight. This code would have to be punched into the SelecTV box to see the fights, which were generally only $12.50 each. SelecTV was one of the first forms of early home pay-per-view subscription programing.

Foreign films were often shown in dubbed and subtitled versions, which were indicated in the channel's monthly programming guide. In the early 1980s, Los Angeles affiliate KWHY simulcast some programs from Z Channel. During Oscar season in the Los Angeles market, regular programming would often be preempted for special "Academy Consideration" screenings of films in contention for Oscar nominations. As early as 1981, SelecTV aired more suggestive R-rated movies and softcore versions of pornographic films on its "Adult Theater" programming block. To enable parental control, the scrambling scheme was slightly different from their regular fare and a key switch on the descrambler unit could lock out decoding of the adult programming.

Another thing that made the channel unique was its policy of incorporating R-rated movies throughout the broadcast day, at a time when other pay services restricted R-rated content until after 8 p.m. SelecTV also transmitted its C-band satellite feed "in the clear" (unscrambled) for a longer time than rivals HBO and Showtime.

In 1986, SelecTV produced one original, non-sports series: the half-hour comedy Channel K. The title of the series was chosen to mock one of SelecTV's early competitors, Z Channel. Each half-hour episode was composed of shorter segments, averaging five minutes, spoofing television programming. There were two comedy spin-offs from Channel K, both also airing in 1986, presented in ten-minute segments in order to be used to fill time as needed between movies. The first was Bachelor Pad, where a self-proclaimed ladies' man gave not-so-helpful tips to single men looking to be more successful at dating women. The second, Handy Dan, gave do-it-yourself lessons that always led to disaster. In 1987, Channel K returned to the network briefly with the new title, Son of Channel K. Three VHS volumes, including episodes of both Channel K and Son of Channel K, as well as segments of Bachelor Pad and Handy Dan, were released on home video in 1989 and 1990.

== See also ==
- ON TV, an over-the-air subscription service that served Los Angeles, Chicago, Cincinnati, Dallas/Fort Worth, Detroit, Fort Lauderdale, Phoenix, Salem/Portland and San Francisco.
- PRISM, an over-the-air and cable television subscription service that served Southeastern Pennsylvania, Southern New Jersey, Delaware and the Delmarva Peninsula.
- Spectrum, an over-the-air subscription service that served Chicago and Minneapolis–St. Paul.
- SuperTV, an over-the-air subscription service that served Washington, D.C., the Capital and Central regions of Maryland and Northern Virginia.
- Wometco Home Theater – an over-the-air subscription service that served New York City, Northern and Central New Jersey, Long Island and Fairfield County, Connecticut.
