= ON TV (TV network) =

American subscription television service

- Original ON TV logo used in most Oak markets and in Portland, Oregon
- Country: United States

Programming
- Language: English

Ownership
- Owner: National Subscription Television, a joint venture of Oak Industries and Chartwell Communications (each market had individual ownership)

History
- Launched: April 1, 1977; 49 years ago
- Closed: June 30, 1985; 41 years ago

ON TV was an American subscription television (STV) service that operated in eight markets between 1977 and 1985. Originally established by National Subscription Television, a joint venture of Oak Industries and Chartwell Communications, ON TV was part of a new breed of STV operations that broadcast premium programming—including movies, sporting events, and concerts—over an encrypted signal on a UHF television station and leased decoders to subscribing customers. At its peak in 1982, ON TV boasted more than 700,000 customers—more than half of them in Los Angeles, its most successful market. However, the rapidly expanding availability of cable television, coupled with a recession, caused the business to quickly lose subscribers at the same time that Oak Industries was experiencing severe financial difficulties. Between March 1983 and June 1985, all eight operations closed.

== History ==
=== Los Angeles launch ===
Logo of Oak Industries

In 1973, Oak Industries, a maker of cable television equipment and other electronic components, and Chartwell Communications, a company majority-owned by Jerry Perenchio and Norman Lear, founded a joint venture initially known as World Pay Television, Inc. to create and operate a subscription television system in the Los Angeles market. The connection was made when Everitt A. Carter, an executive at Oak Industries, attended a tennis match between Billie Jean King and Bobby Riggs in Houston, organized by Perenchio; Perenchio approached Carter and asked if the company could build a system to scramble over-the-air signals for pay distribution. While Oak was initially resistant to the idea, it ultimately agreed to develop the equipment if Perenchio fronted $200,000 for research and development, which he did. In 1976, Oak president Frank A. Astrologes was named chairman of the new venture, with Carter succeeding him at Oak. The company intended to open franchises in 14 different states, per Federal Communications Commission (FCC) filings at the time.

The system, which would use scrambling of a standard UHF television station, required a carrier. That was secured by the venture in 1976 when, under the name of Oak Broadcasting Systems, Oak and Perenchio purchased Los Angeles television station KBSC-TV (channel 52) for $1.2 million as part of the liquidation of its parent company, Kaiser Industries. After changing its name to National Subscription Television (NST), the service launched under the brand name ON TV on April 1, 1977, offering unedited, uninterrupted motion pictures, as well as limited slates of Los Angeles Dodgers, California Angels, Los Angeles Lakers and Los Angeles Kings games, during evening hours. The first 500 subscribers lived in the San Fernando Valley, as part of a soft launch of the new system. It was the second subscription television system in operation, with Wometco Home Theater having launched in New York City the previous month.

Ambitions to expand ON TV beyond Los Angeles were immediate. When the first system went live, Carter claimed "firm contracts" to move forward in eight cities—five of which would eventually be home to ON TV-branded subscription television operations—but stated he wanted to see if the Los Angeles system was a success first. In January 1978, Oak reached a deal with Sears to market ON TV service in the Los Angeles and Orange County area. The next year, ON TV got a competitor: SelecTV, which pioneered a pay-per-program model and only showed movies.

=== Expansion beyond LA ===
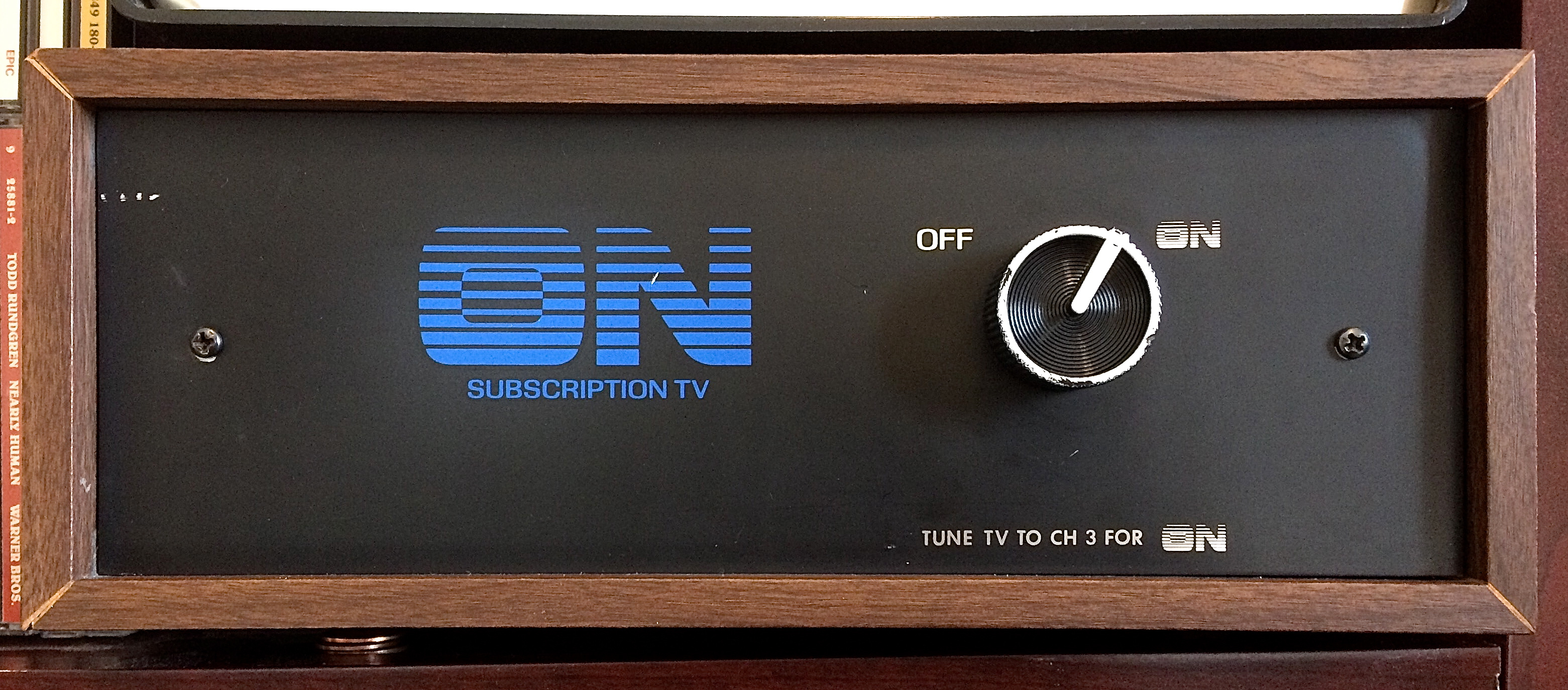
An ON TV decoder box

In October 1978, Oak and Chartwell, the partners in the Los Angeles system, reached an agreement to each develop six ON TV markets on their own; the Oak markets would be Chicago, Phoenix, Miami, Philadelphia, Minneapolis, and Dallas–Fort Worth, while Chartwell was tasked with development in New York, Detroit, Atlanta, San Francisco, Cleveland, and Houston. In Philadelphia, NST had reached a deal with Radio Broadcasting Corporation, which in 1977 was awarded a construction permit for a channel 57 TV station there. The next year, the company announced it would license its equipment and technology in cities where it did not intend to operate itself.

The first of the Oak expansion cities firmed up considerably in November 1978 when Oak announced it would begin operating in Phoenix in July 1979 in a joint venture with the New Television Corporation, which held the construction permit for KNXV-TV (channel 15); New Television would program the station during the day as a free independent, while ON TV would air in the evenings. Oak announced at that time that it would be on the air in Philadelphia and Miami by 1980.

Meanwhile, the ON TV system in Los Angeles grew to more than 100,000 subscribers by the end of 1978 and 200,000 by August 1979, earning it the title of the world's largest single pay-TV operation. Oak's increasing involvement with the entertainment business spurred the entire company, previously headquartered in Crystal Lake, Illinois, to move to southern California, where it built a new headquarters building in the planned community of Rancho Bernardo. As very large cities, like Philadelphia, saw years-long delays in cable television wiring due to political disputes over franchises, the specter of services like ON TV loomed over the horizon and served as an impetus to consider more rapid action.

Chartwell, too, began the task of developing markets. As early as 1977, NST had an agreement to run an STV service on WXON in Detroit, and the two parties aimed for a July 1, 1979, launch. In 1979, the company, through affiliate Tandem Productions, acquired New York City-area station WNJU-TV, and Tandem was waiting in the wings to buy Washington, D.C.'s WDCA-TV if the FCC had rescinded its approval of that station's sale to Taft Broadcasting. Chartwell also explored buying a station in Sacramento, California, in 1980, going so far as to enter into advanced negotiations to purchase that city's KMUV-TV.

As 1979 continued, activity accelerated. Oak announced its intention to open subscription television in Miami at the end of the year from Fort Lauderdale-based WKID-TV, which it had purchased. In Chicago, it reached an agreement with Video 44, owner of UHF station WSNS-TV, to use Oak equipment and technology in its service. (While Video 44 then attempted to sell 50 percent of the company to American Television and Communications, a subsidiary of Time, Inc. and owner of the Preview STV services which had a deal with Zenith to produce its equipment, the company pulled out of the deal in October when major movie studios protested the potential for a monopoly on pay-TV programming between Time's STV holdings and Home Box Office cable network.) The Dallas–Fort Worth market entered the picture when Oak reaffirmed a 1976 deal with Channel 21, Inc., the Sidney Shlenker and Milton Grant–led consortium that held the construction permit for Fort Worth television station KTXA, to bring ON TV to the Metroplex. Oak also filed for construction permits in various cities around the United States, including channel 38 in St. Petersburg, Florida; channel 38 in New Orleans; and channel 20 in Denver. Those applications were joined by a 1981 filing for channel 16 at Everett, Washington, near Seattle.

The Phoenix operation began September 9 when KNXV-TV began broadcasting, and WKID-TV in the Miami–Fort Lauderdale market commenced subscription television broadcasts on January 11, 1980. The first licensed ON TV system, owned by Home Entertainment Network—a division of Buford Television—went live on that company's WBTI-TV in Cincinnati on February 1; the station itself took to the air on January 28. Oak went on air with ON TV in Chicago on September 22, after having bought a 49 percent stake in the licensee of WSNS, and in Dallas–Fort Worth on February 28, 1981. Just eight months after going live in Chicago, ON TV was profitable in that market—said to be unprecedented in the STV industry—and by October 1981, it was joined by all of the Oak-owned operations except Dallas–Fort Worth.

Still more stations appeared to be in the pipeline: Oak had a deal with Baltimore's WBFF to enter that market, and it owned 45 percent of an STV franchise for channel 29 at Minneapolis. Meanwhile, Chartwell—after having attempted to nab rights to New York Yankees baseball—dropped its New York subscription television plans, opting not to scrap WNJU-TV's successful Spanish-language programming and battle the market's dominant STV provider, Wometco Home Theater. (Perenchio would ultimately sell WNJU-TV in 1986.)

=== Oak in control ===
In Los Angeles—the largest ON TV market, where Oak and Chartwell remained partners—the arrangement came into doubt in March 1981. The two sides disagreed over Perenchio's appointment of William M. Siegel, the chief executive of Chartwell, as the general manager of National Subscription Television—Los Angeles. Oak refused to consent to the appointment and claimed that Chartwell and Perenchio had "surreptitiously" placed Siegel on the payroll; it was reported that Oak had no dispute with Siegel but wanted to affirm its authority as 51 percent owner of the venture. Oak chairman Carter was surprised to learn that Siegel made more money than he did. Further, Perenchio drew Oak's ire when the Chartwell ON TV operation in Detroit ordered new decoder boxes from one of Oak's competitors.

Oak and Chartwell settled in September; the suit was dropped, and Oak bought out Chartwell's 49 percent share of National Subscription Television for $55 million. Oak now controlled the entire Los Angeles and Miami systems, as well as majority shares in the Chicago, Dallas–Fort Worth and Phoenix markets, while Chartwell continued to own and operate the Detroit ON TV system. Cincinnati was licensed, to be joined by another licensing agreement Oak made starting January 31, 1982, with Willamette Subscription Television, the STV franchisee for KECH in the Portland, Oregon, market.

By May 1982, ON TV in southern California had 400,000 subscribers. Oak boasted some 600,000 subscribers in its five ON TV markets, not counting Detroit, Cincinnati, or Portland. Additionally, Oak planned to start a ninth system in Houston in 1983, broadcasting over KTXH (channel 20), the under-construction sister station to KTXA. However, by November, as KTXH itself neared air, it had become clear that Oak was not pursuing Houston plans, having essentially shuttered its part of the operation; Houston Chronicle television editor Ann Hodges cited the increasing wiring of the city for cable, the increased carriage of KTXH by cable systems without STV operation, and more expansive sports coverage planned in Houston than in Dallas–Fort Worth.

=== Headwinds ===
ON TV subscribers by market, June 1982
Station	Market	Owner	Subscribers
KBSC-TV	Los Angeles	Oak	379,000
WSNS-TV	Chicago	Oak	120,600
WXON	Detroit	Chartwell	61,900
WBTI-TV	Cincinnati	United Cable	45,200
WKID-TV	Miami–Fort Lauderdale	Oak	44,700
KNXV-TV	Phoenix	Oak	38,500
KTXA	Dallas–Fort Worth	Oak	24,800
KECH	Portland–Salem	Willamette	12,000
Total			726,700

Subscription television would prove to reach its zenith in 1982, however. That year, STV operations rapidly went from gaining subscribers to losing them. After seeing 65 percent growth in 1981, STV operators grew their subscriber rolls by just 0.8 percent the next year. A worsening recession and faster-than-anticipated growth of cable television became hazards. As ON TV operations in some markets began to face headwinds, the financial picture of Oak Industries itself worsened. In October 1982, it revised down its earnings guidance due to declining sales of its 56-channel cable box, due to the recession and technical issues. Even though one analyst described subscription television as "clearly just an interim business", the company remained "bullish about STV"; it struck a deal with Telstar to sublease two satellite transponders, opening the door to satellite delivery of ON TV's programming to local STV and MDS franchisees, low-power television stations, and cable companies.

Another problem faced by subscription outlets was that they leased time from television stations, which in some cases were not owned by the STV operator. This led to several fights between station owners and franchisees, Oak-owned or otherwise. As early as 1980, WXON in Detroit was objecting to ON TV's airing of the movie Is There Sex After Death?. KNXV-TV in Phoenix had threatened to stop airing ON TV's "adults only" late-night fare, and ON TV took the station to court over its refusal to cede early evening hours, which generated 60 percent of the television station's revenue. KTXA won a legal fight against ON TV in that market, taking away all its adult programming and prompting competitor VEU to run ads with headlines such as "For real adult entertainment, turn-on to VEU".

The first ON TV service to close was Chartwell's Detroit system, which shuttered on March 31, 1983. It cited falling subscriber figures, from 68,000 to 42,000 in just a year; an inability to obtain more airtime from WXON; and competition from the it service that aired on Ann Arbor-based WIHT. The operating hours that WXON allowed ON TV to have in the Detroit market continually hampered the service's ability to show sporting events, directly causing it to drop a package of Detroit Tigers baseball games it aired.

Oak was next to announce casualties. On April 15, 1983, citing the situations in each market, it announced it would shutter its Dallas–Fort Worth and Phoenix systems. In Phoenix, the advance of cable and other factors had caused subscribers to drop from a peak of 39,000 in July 1982 to 25,000 at closure. Besides the Dallas–Fort Worth conflict with KTXA, the company had been handicapped by a late entry into a market that at the time had two existing STV competitors—VEU and Preview, which merged their local operations in late 1982 into a service with more program hours—and was the nation's most crowded. Anthony Cassara, president of the television division of VEU owner Golden West Broadcasters, had previously described that market as "total insanity" when it had three competing operators. Expanded hours were crucial to keeping services alive as cable companies grew: in June 1983, Cincinnati's WBTI axed hours of free programming and began taking satellite-fed ON TV programming from Oak in place of its local feed.

In August, Willamette Subscription Television, the Portland licensee and also the operator of a microwave system transmitting HBO to customers, filed for bankruptcy; it owed $4.7 million to a group of 20 major creditors, including $1 million to Oak. By this time, however, it had ceased receiving programming from Oak. KECH, which itself filed for bankruptcy in November 1983, ceased ON TV broadcasts on August 19, 1984.

=== Collapse and demise ===
As Oak Industries faced wider financial trouble, it sought to reduce its involvement in the operation of its three remaining directly owned ON TV systems. In October 1983, operation of the Los Angeles, Chicago, and Miami–Fort Lauderdale systems shifted from Oak to a new company, Twin Arts Productions, led by former Playgirl magazine publisher Ira Ritter; the three services counted 370,000 total subscribers, down from 550,000 in October 1982. In early 1984, Oak announced a revamped ON TV program lineup, and its operations did score a victory when its direct competitor, Spectrum, opted to discontinue operating in Chicago and sell its subscriber base. However, Oak's condition continued to deteriorate. Later that month, the company announced it was being investigated by the Securities and Exchange Commission (SEC), and it posted a loss of $166.1 million for 1983. One of the company's auditors, Arthur Andersen, qualified its statement, fearing that Oak could not fully realize its $134 million investment in subscription television.

As pressure increased on Oak's finances and the ON TV systems continued to lose subscribers during 1984, cuts were made. In mid-July, National Subscription Television of Fort Lauderdale laid off 41 employees—half its staff. Less than two weeks later, Oak announced that it had sold WKID-TV to John Blair & Co. for $17.75 million; the new buyers intended to program it as a Spanish-language station.

In August—after a year of speculation—it emerged that Oak was in talks to sell the Los Angeles system to SelecTV, which had competed alongside ON TV for six years in the Southern California market. A deal was initially reached, then collapsed. That October, after a year, management of ON TV had been brought back in house after the Twin Arts arrangement was ended in order to cut costs; the company had also taken over its satellite distribution to some 140,000 subscribers after dissolving the Telstar joint venture. Oak chairman Everitt Carter, under a cloud of uncertainty, abruptly left the position in December 1984.

SelecTV ultimately acquired the Los Angeles operation, by then with just 156,000 subscribers, in February 1985. That same month, Oak reached a deal to sell KBSC-TV to an investor group, Estrella Communications, headed by Joe Wallach, in a $30 million transaction. That station formally relaunched as Spanish-language KVEA in November. On June 1, 1985, WBTI—which had been sold and relaunched as WIII at the start of the year—dropped ON TV, with just 3,200 remaining subscribers, when Oak ceased providing programming by satellite.

Oak had one last portion of its subscription television business to dismantle, in Chicago, where WSNS ceased broadcasting as a subscription station on June 30 and began broadcasting programming from the Spanish International Network the next day. However, WSNS's years as a subscription television station had left a legacy that impeded Oak's ability to sell its stake in channel 44 for years. In 1982, Monroe Communications Corporation filed a challenge to WSNS's license renewal and a competing application to establish a channel 44 TV station in Chicago, charging that, as an STV station between 1979 and 1982, WSNS failed to serve the public interest and severely cut back on public affairs programming. An FCC administrative law judge found against WSNS licensee Video 44 and in favor of Monroe in 1985. The FCC later granted the renewal, only for a federal appeals court to rule in Monroe's favor in April 1990. After the FCC officially denied the license renewal in September 1990, however, Chicago's Hispanic community and civic leaders rallied around WSNS. Video 44 and Monroe reached an $18 million settlement agreement in 1993, and Oak and fellow Video 44 partner Harriscope sold their stake in the station to Telemundo in 1995.

== Service and programming ==
Subscribers were charged $40 to $50 installation and $19.95 to $22.50 per month, depending on the market, in the first three ON TV launches (Los Angeles, Phoenix, and Detroit).

ON TV programming consisted of four basic components: movies, sporting events, special events such as concerts and boxing matches, and adult programming. Though there was variance between ON TV operations—particularly with regard to sports programming in each market—after 1983, when it established the Telstar joint venture, Oak was able to supply much of this programming directly to affiliates and home satellite dish owners.

The ON TV decoder supported additional program tiers and pay-per-view events on top of the normal service, for which subscribers would have to pay additional money. This functionality was used to broadcast pay-per-view events including boxing matches—consistently the most successful PPV offering—as well as an "adults only" service of late-night movies. Among the notable pay-per-view presentations provided by ON TV (and other STV systems) was the first television screening of Star Wars in 1982, for which subscribers paid an additional $7.95. However, the system could not provide alternate fare for subscribers who did not pay for the movie, so those customers simply received no STV programming—just a blank screen. While more than 30 percent of customers in Oak's ON TV territory paid for Star Wars, conversion rates had surpassed 60 percent in some cases for boxing matches.

Adult programming had high uptake in STV operations nationwide, and ON TV was no exception. In early 1983, 48 percent of subscribers across all ON TV systems paid an extra fee to subscribe to it. In Dallas–Fort Worth—despite being the last Oak market to offer the "Adults Only" tier—89 percent of subscribers opted in; it was 70 percent in Miami. Uptake ranged from 50 to 90 percent at other STV operations nationwide, including Wometco Home Theater and SelecTV Milwaukee.

== Equipment ==
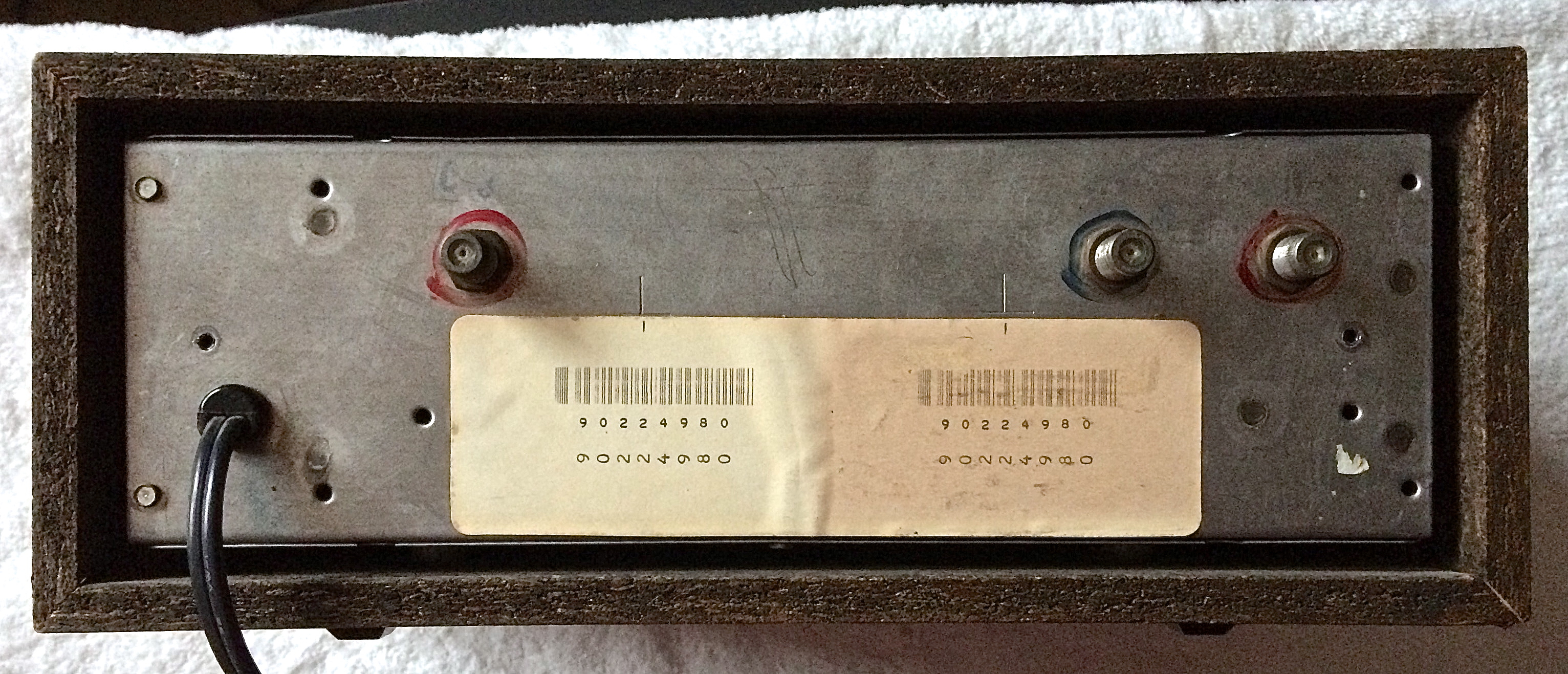
An ON TV decoder without its rear plate, showing the serial number and barcode, part of the addressability function

With the notable exception of Chartwell's operation in Detroit, which used equipment from rival Blonder-Tongue, ON TV systems, including all five owned by Oak itself, used scrambling technology and decoder hardware developed and manufactured by Oak, known as the "Model I". The boxes, connected to a standard UHF television antenna, decoded the encrypted STV signal for paying subscribers and output it to their sets. Each decoder was individually addressable, which meant they could be controlled centrally from the transmitter; addressability allowed for electronic connections and disconnections, as well as the ability to offer pay-per-view services, and allowed Oak to implement a theft deterrent where any disconnected decoder box stopped providing service after eight minutes. The decoders also supported an optional key module that served as a form of parental control. When ON TV entered into a partnership to start SportsVision, a second STV service, in Chicago, Oak manufactured special two-channel decoders that supported both services.

The last two new Oak STV installations—Dallas–Fort Worth and Portland—utilized a newer and more secure version of the Sigma scrambling system.

=== Piracy ===
A problem that would be a constant for all subscription television operators was signal piracy. As early as late 1978, the Los Angeles Times described the Oak ON TV decoder as one that "reportedly can be built at home by handy TV technicians".

In 1980, a trio of lawsuits against manufacturers of pirate decoders converged. Oak won a case in Phoenix, as did Chartwell in Detroit. In a case involving pirate decoders in Los Angeles, however, a Los Angeles federal judge ruled against Oak and ruled that ON TV did not hold a monopoly on decoding its signals. Two months later, California Governor Jerry Brown signed a new law prohibiting the sale of unauthorized STV decoding equipment. For Oak, piracy became a serious threat—and one not easily remediated, given the extensive install base of decoders and the inability to pinpoint where pirate decoders were located. Further, in Los Angeles, ON TV had begun turning on disconnected decoders regularly to restore service to subscribers affected by power failures in neighborhoods.

Affecting all STV operations—but most severely impacting Chartwell in Detroit—was the cottage industry that sprang up in Windsor, Ontario, Canada, across the Detroit River. The Canadian Radio-television and Telecommunications Commission's then-ongoing study of pay television services prompted the company to halt any plans to start its own business operations there; when asked about the possibility of ON TV being legal in Canada, communications minister David MacDonald replied that the idea "would appear to fly in the face of every statement that's ever been made about Canadian broadcasting".

It was legal, however, for Windsor residents to build decoders to receive ON TV—and some 10,000 existed within two years of beginning STV operation in Detroit—but when those decoders started to enter the United States and pose a challenge to Chartwell's operation, the company moved to take action. In late May 1981, the company stationed process servers outside of the Windsor offices of one decoder manufacturer, Video Gallery, to dissuade potential U.S. buyers. Chartwell then took Video Gallery and its American clients to U.S. federal court, seeking an injunction, and got it, preventing Americans from importing its products. In response, Video Gallery obtained an injunction in an Ontario court preventing ON TV representatives from interfering with customers entering its store.

However, Chartwell would gain the upper hand. After winning its initial injunction, the government closed the border to Canadian decoders in August. Video Gallery closed at the end of the year, and Chartwell won a $618,000 judgment against it in March 1982. Even then, it was estimated that some 10,000 additional households received ON TV in southwestern Ontario, including on master antenna systems in apartment complexes—none of them making money for Chartwell.

ON TV companies responded to piracy by modifying pulse signals and introducing new scrambling techniques. In Detroit, Chartwell began migrating to a new generation of decoder boxes. In 1984, ON TV Chicago, also afflicted by heavy pirating, offered "amnesty" to pirate users ahead of the launch of new scrambling equipment.

== Stations ==
ON TV was broadcast over the air on eight stations in the United States:

ON TV stations
Market	Station	Launch date	Closure date	Current status
Los Angeles, California	KBSC-TV 52	April 1, 1977	February 1985	Telemundo owned-and-operated station KVEA
Detroit, Michigan	WXON 20	July 1, 1979	March 31, 1983	Independent station WMYD
Phoenix, Arizona	KNXV-TV 15	September 9, 1979	May 4, 1983	ABC affiliate
Miami–Fort Lauderdale, Florida	WKID-TV 51	January 11, 1980	November 1984	Telemundo owned-and-operated station WSCV
Cincinnati, Ohio	WBTI 64	February 1, 1980	May 31, 1985	MyNetworkTV affiliate WSTR-TV
Chicago, Illinois	WSNS 44	September 15, 1980	June 30, 1985	Telemundo owned-and-operated station
Dallas–Fort Worth, Texas	KTXA 21	February 28, 1981	April 30, 1983	Independent station
Portland–Salem, Oregon	KECH 22	January 31, 1982	August 19, 1984	Ion Television owned-and-operated station KPXG-TV

=== Los Angeles ===
The first ON TV service launched in the Los Angeles market on April 1, 1977, on KBSC-TV (channel 52), licensed to Corona; ON TV's offices were in Glendale. Channel 52 shuffled its ethnic programming lineup in favor of carrying ON TV during evening hours beginning at 8:00 p.m. (KBSC-TV changed its commercial program format to Spanish-language shows in 1980.)

By April 1979, the service was signing up 12,000 subscribers a month. By that year, it had grown its sports portfolio beyond the Dodgers, Angels, Lakers, and Kings to include USC Trojans college sports and Los Angeles Aztecs soccer, as well as horse racing from Santa Anita Park. After the FCC repealed a rule in late 1982 that required television stations offering a subscription service to broadcast at least 20 hours a week of unencrypted programming, KBSC began running ON TV 24 hours a day and displaced its existing Spanish-language daytime programming.

However, as Oak dismantled its former STV empire, it quickly sold the ON TV subscriber base, by then dwindling, and KBSC-TV to separate parties weeks apart. SelecTV continued to broadcast over KBSC-TV for several more months until the new, Spanish-language KVEA was ready to debut.

=== Detroit ===
In the only system Chartwell controlled outright, ON TV came to Detroit on July 1, 1979, broadcasting on WXON (channel 20); it had 15,000 subscribers within three months. The service quickly snared the rights to Detroit Red Wings hockey, Detroit Tigers baseball (consisting of 20 weeknight games a year from Tiger Stadium), and Michigan Wolverines athletics (including tape-delayed football games). In the case of the Wolverines, it even ran one experimental 1979 telecast live, a presentation spearheaded by Michigan athletic director Don Canham with the blessing of the NCAA.

WXON, however, proved to be a poor partner for ON TV. After airing the R-rated movie Is There Sex After Death? (which contained considerable sex and nudity) on March 12, 1980, the station then ordered ON TV to screen all movies it aired for WXON executives. More critically, however, the station refused to cede any time before 8:00 p.m. and aired reruns in that time slot, severely crippling it as a sports broadcaster. Midweek Red Wings and Tigers games regularly began before ON TV was on the air, forcing the station to join games in progress (as with the Red Wings) or tape delay them (which it did for the Tigers). This flaw became highly visible when the Red Wings played the Calgary Flames on October 29, 1981; the Red Wings had scored five goals in the first period before ON TV picked up the game. WXON then sued ON TV to get out of what Chartwell claimed was a "fifty-year contract" with the station. After the 1982 season, ON TV dropped its Tigers deal because it could not secure the air time it needed to telecast games in their entirety.

In a bid to stem the piracy problem that had dogged it for nearly its entire existence, Chartwell began upgrading from its original Blonder-Tongue units to a new generation of addressable decoders in 1982. It would not be enough. When ON TV closed in Detroit on March 31, 1983, Chartwell shuttered a business in which it had invested $13 million but never turned a profit. The system—which was vigorously competing against it, the subscription service on Ann Arbor-based WIHT, and Livonia-based MDS service MORE-TV, in addition to rapidly proliferating cable services—had lost 26,000 of the 68,000 subscribers it claimed at its peak.

=== Phoenix ===
In Phoenix, ON TV launched on a new UHF television station, KNXV-TV (channel 15), which signed on September 9, 1979, and immediately began carrying subscription television programming. The company immediately secured top-tier sports: in Phoenix, ON TV held telecast rights at various times to ASU sports, the Phoenix Suns, Phoenix Giants minor league baseball, and Los Angeles Kings hockey. By July 1982, it had 39,000 subscribers in Phoenix, but signs of trouble were emerging. In 1981, the Suns signed a 13-year agreement to telecast games through American Cable (resulting in the launch of the Arizona Sports Programming Network), which sub-licensed games to ON TV in part because they had not wired all of the metropolitan area. Late in 1982, KNXV resisted a request to expand ON TV to start before 7:00 p.m. on weekdays and 5:00 p.m. on weekends, while the station also wanted the subscription service to stop screening adult movies.

Phoenix was one of the first markets to show serious subscriber erosion. By April 1983, its subscriber base had dipped below 25,000, a drop of more than 35 percent. Oak Communications ultimately shuttered ON TV in Phoenix on May 4, 1983, resulting in the loss of 140 jobs.

=== Miami–Fort Lauderdale ===
In 1979, Oak bought Fort Lauderdale television station WKID (channel 51) for $4.1 million, with the intention of using it to bring ON TV to south Florida. ON TV then began operating on January 11, 1980, broadcasting subscription programming from 7:00 p.m. to midnight on weekdays and 5:00 p.m. to midnight on weekends. Operating in a market with few professional sporting franchises, one of the immediate draws was a package of games of the Fort Lauderdale Strikers. 5,200 subscribers were signed up in the service's first two months, and it claimed 15,000 by July.

In September 1981, ON TV added further hours, starting at 6:00 p.m. on weekdays. It expanded again in July 1982.

By July 1984, when ON TV laid off half its staff, subscriptions had fallen from a 1982 high of 44,700 to 28,500, making it the smallest of Oak's STV operations at the time. At the time that John Blair & Co. acquired WKID-TV, it was broadcasting from 4:00 p.m. to 2:00 a.m. and from 10:00 a.m. to 2:00 a.m. on weekends.

Blair completed the acquisition in December. Channel 51 then went off the air as Blair prepared to implement the station's relaunch as WSCV, south Florida's second Spanish-language television station.

=== Cincinnati ===
ON TV began airing on independent station WBTI (channel 64) on February 1, 1980, airing alongside commercial general-entertainment programming that aired until 7:00 p.m. on weekdays. In 1982, Buford Television, which built WBTI and owned the ON TV operation through its Home Entertainment Network unit, sold an 80 percent stake to United Cable for a reported $20 million; the television station itself was then sold in April 1983. Unusually for a subscription television operation, WBTI expanded its reach through the construction of a channel 66 translator in Dayton, approved in September 1980 and launched in May 1981; the station had already signed up some customers in that area.

By 1983, Warner-Amex cable was spreading throughout the Cincinnati market, causing interest in ON TV to decline considerably. In June, WBTI dropped most of its commercial programming, with the exception of The 700 Club at 10:00 a.m. on weekdays as well as a couple of religious programs on Sunday mornings, to expand ON TV's hours; it laid off staff and began relying on Oak's new satellite feed to program the subscription service. That October, United Cable, which had acquired 80 percent of Buford's three STV operations (the other of two of which operated as Spectrum in Chicago and Minneapolis), wrote down the entire unit and offered the systems for sale.

United sold 90 percent of WBTI in November 1984 to Channel 64 Joint Venture for $9.4 million, at which time ON TV had just 12,500 local subscribers (75 percent of which subscribed to adult programming), compared to 45,200 in June 1982. The station relaunched as WIII on January 1, 1985; it restored a general-entertainment schedule, with ON TV programming being relegated to overnight hours only. With a mere 3,200 subscribers remaining and Oak shutting down its satellite feed, ON TV in Cincinnati ended on June 1, 1985, at which time WIII converted into a full-time general-entertainment independent station.

=== Chicago ===
We were rarely profitable in the year before we went into subscription television. We're not making a lot of money now, but we're making more than we were then.

— Ed Morris, general manager of WSNS, at the station's full-time conversion to subscription television in 1982

Chicago was the second-to-last Oak market to launch—WSNS (channel 44) did not begin airing STV until September 22, 1980—but would prove to be among the company's longest-lasting markets. Initially, WSNS–then operating as an independent station–continued unscrambled, commercial programming until 7:00 p.m. on weekdays and on weekends until 5:00 p.m.

A year after ON TV began broadcasting, it got competition when Spectrum, originally owned by Buford Television, began airing over Focus Broadcasting-owned WFBN (channel 66) on September 29, 1981. At the same time, WSNS extended its transmission of ON TV programming by two hours on weekdays (now starting at 5:00 p.m.) and by three hours on weekends (to 12:00 p.m.). In January 1982, WSNS began carrying ON TV for 20 hours per day, and after the repeal of the limits on STV operating hours, it went round-the-clock—resulting in the dismissal of WSNS's own sales unit and other station staffers.

At the same time that ON TV was gaining subscribers, SportsVision International, a consortium of four Chicago sports franchises—the White Sox, Bulls, Blackhawks, and Sting—had reached a deal to set up a new subscription television station on channel 60 (the shared time WPWR/WBBS), which would carry their games. Both Oak and Buford competed for the right to manage the service, and Oak won out; ON TV subscribers could receive SportsVision for an extra $14.95 a month, and a special run of two-channel decoders was made.

SportsVision finally launched May 25, 1982, having been delayed due to issues with the new decoders and then again due to low uptake, airing as a free preview for two extra weeks.

The second STV operation, however, did not reach the subscriber base needed to maintain its viability. By March 1983, it had 25,000 subscribers, half of the amount needed to break even, not helped by the poor performance of the White Sox in the 1982 season. In November, still at just 35,000 subscribers and losing $300,000 a month, it was announced that SportsVision would be folded into ON TV on January 1, 1984, with channel 44's STV service televising a significant number of games and SportsVision continuing as a premium cable channel in suburban areas and outside of the Chicago metropolitan area; the remaining service was then sold to SportsChannel.

ON TV entered 1984 battered by piracy problems, which had also been cited by White Sox owner Eddie Einhorn as a reason for the end of SportsVision as a separate STV service. In January, the service's operations director estimated that, for every paying subscriber, another was pirating its programming. Subscriber figures had dropped from 89,500 in August 1983 to 80,000 in August 1984, of which 18,000 were previous clients of Spectrum. The service was also instituting program cutbacks. In November 1984, non-professional sports, children's programs and some other low-rated programming were axed to emphasize movies and a reduced schedule of events from SportsVision. By year's end, Oak had put its remaining STV services up for sale, and Chicago had fallen to 75,000 subscribers.

In February 1985, as Oak's financial condition continued to worsen, it emerged that the company was taking writedowns related to the termination of its STV businesses; Burt Harris, owner of WSNS owner Harriscope, stated that he didn't see the service making it to the end of the year. It would not, ceasing operations June 30, 1985, and bringing to a close Oak's eight-year venture into subscription television.

=== Dallas–Fort Worth ===
Oak would like more hours, but we're not going to do it for them. We've probably come on full-force more than any other 'STV station'.

— Milton Grant, general manager of KTXA

ON TV on KTXA (channel 21) was a late entrant into the most competitive subscription television market in the nation. By the time ON TV signed on in the Dallas–Fort Worth Metroplex, the area had two competing STV services: VEU and Preview. In September 1982, VEU bought the Preview Dallas operation. VEU, aside from being the leader in subscribers, also had the two largest sports attractions in the market, airing Dallas Mavericks and Texas Rangers games; ON TV, by contrast, aired weekly Southwest Conference basketball during the season.

An operation already struggling for position in a contested media market and with fewer broadcast hours than VEU was then kneecapped by KTXA's vigorous opposition to adult programming—objecting to expansion and blocking the showing of adult movies—which produced a frosty relationship between station and STV franchisee. The competitive market and contentious relationship contributed to the service discontinuing operations on April 30, 1983.

=== Portland ===
Like in Phoenix, ON TV began operations on a new station, KECH (channel 22), which began telecasting from Salem, Oregon, on November 21, 1981. Willamette Subscription Television, the local ON TV company which was commonly owned with the station by Arnold Brustin and Chris Desmond, rented evening airtime from KECH, but the operation never turned a profit. In its first year of operation, Willamette had lost $6.6 million, and by December 1982, the station was owed $300,000. The state of the operation was such that the limited partners in Willamette Subscription Television sued Brustin and Desmond for mismanagement in a case that was settled out of court. In 1982, Willamette acquired Premier Home Box Office, a microwave system delivering HBO to 10,000 subscribers, from Canadian company Rogers; Premier had more subscribers at the time than ON TV in the area, which had 6,000.

After Brustin and Desmond were brought in on an interim basis to manage the subscription service on KTSF in San Francisco, which used SelecTV programming, the two opted to convert from ON TV to SelecTV programming. Willamette filed bankruptcy in mid-1983, and a court ordered Desmond to create a debt repayment schedule for more than $4.7 million owed to 20 major creditors; meanwhile, the HBO microwave service battled signal piracy of its own. That November, KECH joined it in bankruptcy reorganization.

On August 19, 1984, the ON TV service ended, with KECH programming older movies in prime time; the station at the time stated its plans to transmit adults-only subscription television programming in late nights under the name "Cascade Entertainment Network" after that date.
