= Oak Industries =

American electronics company

Oak Industries, Inc.
- Company type: Public
- Traded as: NYSE: OAK
- Industry: Electronics
- Founded: 1932; 93 years ago in Crystal Lake, Illinois
- Founder: Edward S. Bessey
- Defunct: January 28, 2000; 25 years ago
- Fate: Acquired by Corning Inc.
- Website: oakind.com at the Wayback Machine (archived 1998-02-09)

Oak Industries, Inc. was an American electronics company that manufactured a variety of products throughout seven decades in the 20th century. In existence from 1932 to 2000, the company's business lines primarily centered around electronic components and materials, though the company made a high-profile and ultimately failed extension into communications media in the late 1970s and early 1980s. The firm was founded in Crystal Lake, Illinois, moving its headquarters to Rancho Bernardo, California, in the late 1970s and again to Waltham, Massachusetts, in 1990. Corning Inc. purchased Oak in January 2000 primarily for its Lasertron division, a manufacturer of lasers.

== Early history ==
Oak Industries was founded in 1932 as Oak Manufacturing in a 400,000-square-foot (37,000 m^{2}) plant in Crystal Lake, Illinois, by Edward S. Bessey, during the Great Depression. Initially a manufacturer of electrical switches and Bakelite, as well as dial light bulbs and light bulb socket assemblies, the company quickly leaned into the burgeoning radio industry in the 1930s. Oak manufactured radio components, such as tube sockets, for the next decade and a half before finding success with television tuning dials (rotary switches) amid the mass introduction of TV in the early 1950s. This prompted the company to expand its reach in television component manufacturing, acquiring competitors and establishing business units for component manufacturing and materials processing for printed circuit boards between 1956 and 1970. Oak reincorporated in Delaware in 1960.

Everitt A. Carter joined the company in 1958 and became chairman in 1963. The next year, Oak renamed itself Oak Electro-netics Corporation in an attempt to characterize its increasingly diverse businesses. The corporate name was changed again, to Oak Industries in 1972. For many years, Oak was the largest employer in Crystal Lake. A 1991 profile of the company's history regarded the late 1960s and early 1970s as its zenith; at one time, the company struggled to hire people and had to rent additional office space because it was growing so quickly. Having traded publicly since its initial public offering in 1944, Oak became listed on the New York Stock Exchange in 1967. Around this time, the company came to own an electrical equipment manufacturing business in South America, a gas valve and electrical control company in Mexico, and Adec, a maker of energy management solutions.

In 1976, the company formed a joint venture with Anaconda Copper and Mitsui Mining to form Oak-Mitsui, of which 68.6 percent was owned by Oak, 19.1 percent by Mitsui, and 12.3 percent by Anaconda. When Anaconda backed out, Oak's share rose to 78.2. Oak-Mitsui primarily manufactured copper sheet and foil for precision instruments. Initially only used to support Oak's own materials processing division, Oak-Mitsui grew rapidly in 1979 and by next year was the third-largest supplier of copper foil in the United States. By 1984, the venture had begun supplying foil for outside circuit board laminators.

== Media expansion and ON TV ==
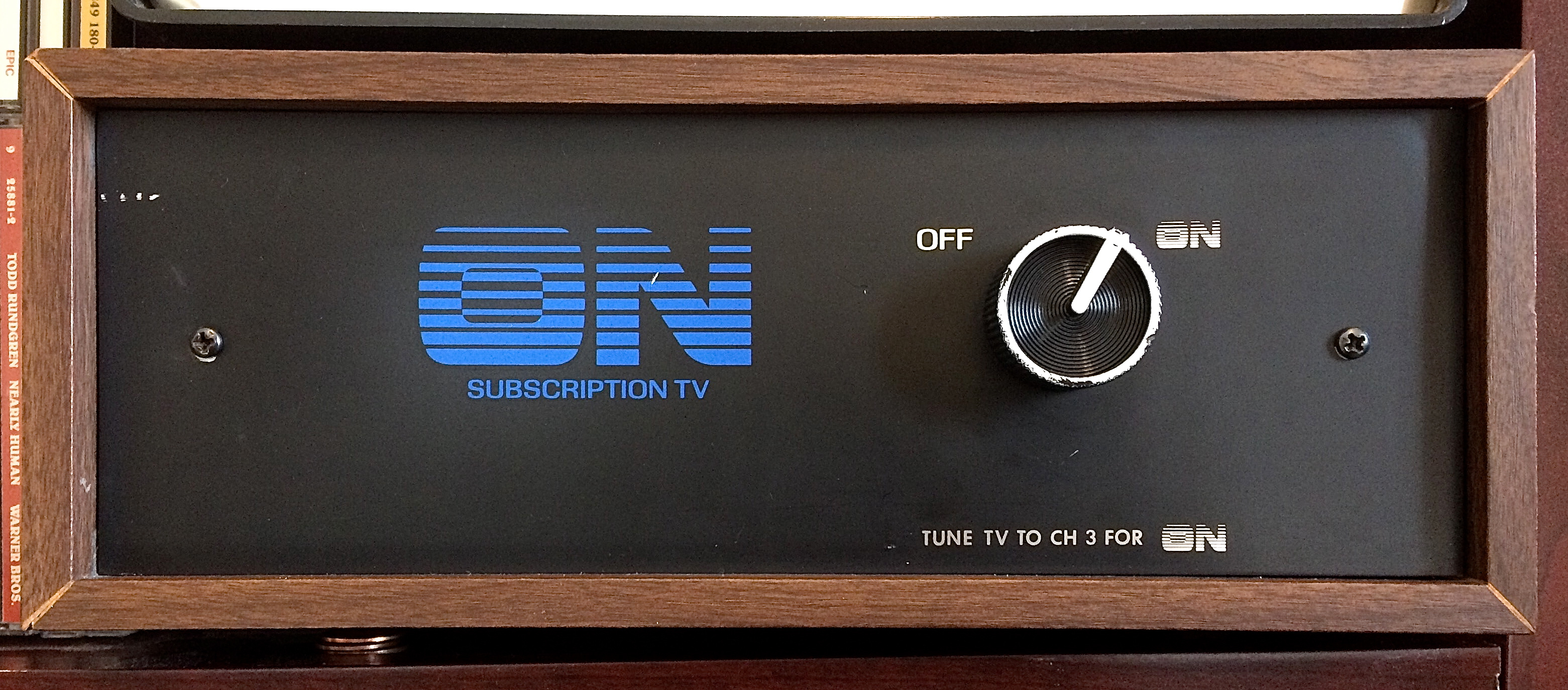
An ON TV decoder box, manufactured by Oak Industries

In 1971, the company made one of the earliest cable TV boxes; it enjoyed a substantial position in this market, where it pioneered the addressable converter, which enabled cable system headends to communicate to individual decoders in subscribers' homes. This development helped Oak grow in the telecommunications industry. Oak Communications, as the division came to be known, manufactured equipment for community antenna television (CATV) and opened a financial consulting division, servicing broadcasting entities. As well, Oak became the largest American maker of TV tuning dials by 1980.

In 1973, Oak partnered with Chartwell Communications to form World Pay Television, later National Subscription Television. This joint venture led to the development of ON TV, a subscription television (STV) service that aired on ultra high frequency (UHF) TV stations from 1977 to 1985. Service began in Los Angeles in April 1977; it soon expanded to seven other metropolitan areas, including Detroit, Phoenix, Miami–Fort Lauderdale, Cincinnati, Chicago, Dallas–Fort Worth, and Portland–Salem.

Like other STV operations, ON TV consisted of a scrambled feed of content broadcast over conventional UHF stations, which was designed to especially reach areas not yet served by cable. Subscribers paid a monthly fee for the use of a descrambler box—which, with the notable exception of the Detroit system, was also manufactured by Oak. Los Angeles was ON TV's strongest market by far, with over 400,000 subscribers at its peak in 1982, or over half of all subscriptions at that point. Oak moved its headquarters to Rancho Bernardo, San Diego, in 1979, to keep a better pulse on the entertainment industry that produced their content. In 1980, Oak Industries reached a peak of 11,000 employees, 2,500 of which worked from the Crystal Lake headquarters.

ON TV was initially a success for Oak, contributing US$260 million in revenues in 1981 (equivalent to $903 million in 2024)—more than their components and materials segments that year combined ($150.1 million and $96 million, respectively); further, Oak extended itself further into media by co-producing the 1983 film Psycho II as part of what was to be a four-film agreement with Universal Pictures. However, the projected growth of over-the-air subscription TV in the 1980s did not occur, stunted by the growth of cable, and the early 1980s U.S. recession hit Oak's other segments. Simultaneously, Oak's cable TV converter box line hit a rough patch with the introduction of its TC-56 56-channel cable box; it was marred by technical issues and was subject to a voluntary recall, and Oak's share of the market fell from more than 50 percent to 15 percent.

ON TV systems began closing in 1983 due to conflicts relating to programming time, cable eroding subscriber figures, and high-profile disputes with stations over the broadcast of adult programming. Amid investigations with the Securities and Exchange Commission (SEC) regarding Oak overstating earnings in 1982 and the use of Carter's wife to provide interior design services, lawsuits with shareholders, and debt to creditors, Oak (by this point the sole owner of ON TV in Los Angeles) sold ON TV's last remaining operation in Los Angeles to competitor SelecTV in 1985. Oak also sold off WKID and KBSC-TV, television stations in the Miami and Los Angeles markets it had owned to broadcast ON TV; the firm was unable to dispose of its ownership interest in WSNS-TV, the former ON TV station in Chicago, until 1995 due to a challenge to that station's Federal Communications Commission license. Oak's STV scrambling technology was later used in modified form by the M-Net service in South Africa.

Oak had ambitions to expand into the nascent world of direct broadcast satellite systems and programming, though it scaled down its goals due to increasing costs. Its Oak Orion scrambling system was used for the transmission of Cancom services on the Anik satellites to Canada. However, when major cable services including HBO and Cinemax sought to encrypt their satellite signals, rival San Diego firm M/A-COM Linkabit was chosen over Oak to develop what became VideoCipher II, the industry standard.

== McNeely's tenure, proxy fight, and downsizing ==
The previous management made some bad investments in pay TV. In finding out cable TV didn't work for us, we lost a hell of a lot of money.

— E. L. McNeely, chairman of Oak Industries from 1984 to 1989

Everitt A. Carter, the chairman of Oak for 21 years, abruptly resigned in late 1984. His resignation culminated a year in which the company held its annual meeting near its Oak Materials plants in Hoosick Falls in upstate New York, with some shareholders suggesting the decision to do so was calculated to dissuade attendance.

E. L. McNeely (1919–1991), formerly of the Wickes Companies, was brought in as interim chairman in November 1984; his position was later made permanent. He continued a downsizing that had already begun in the last year of Carter's tenure. McNeely saw the downsizing of Oak's Rancho Bernardo headquarters' staff from 250 to 50 within three years of his tenure. In 1985, he sold off Oak's subsidiaries in Mexico and South America as well as Adec; Oak had let these units stagnate, and by the early 1980s they had consistently failed to turn profits. In 1986, he sold the company's esteemed materials division to AlliedSignal. The company paid off $195.5 million of its $230 million worth of outstanding debt, as of 1985, with the proceeds from this sale to AlliedSignal. This effectively turned Oak's net worth from negative $69.9 million to positive $65 million; contemporary analysts credited McNeely with saving the company from bankruptcy. Oak's name was cleared by the SEC in 1987, and $33 million was paid to stockholders who had collectively filed a class action suit against the company in the years before that year.

Fueled by tax-loss carry-forwards obtained due to Oak's operating losses, between late 1986 and early 1987, the company made two disparate acquisitions: the Quartz Crystal Components Group from the Electronic Technologies Corporation of New York and the Railway Maintenance Equipment Company from the Rexnord Corporation. In May 1987, Oak acquired Nordco, another manufacturer of railroad maintenance equipment. The Quartz Crystal Components Group comprised three subsidiaries—Croven Crystals Ltd. of Whitby, Ontario, a maker of quartz components for precision applications; Ovenaire-Audio-Carpenter of Charlottesville, Virginia, a maker of crystal oscillators for the telecommunications and defense sectors; and Houston Electronics, a Kane, Pennsylvania-based manufacturer of airtight enclosures for quartz components. Oak sold off Croven Crystals by the middle of 1987. McNeely asserted that the remaining acquisitions were within industries resilient to another recession. Pending patent infringement suits against Zenith Electronics, General Instrument, M/A-COM Linkabit, and several other television equipment manufacturers also promised a trickle of profit in the meantime, according to McNeely.

These acquisitions were not without detractors within Oak, however. Roderick M. Hills, a former SEC chairman and friend of McNeely's who was brought onto Oak's board of directors in 1985, led a proxy fight for control of the board in April 1989. He found fault in McNeely's hiring of chief financial officer Alan Steel without first informing the board; the erratic nature of McNeely's acquisitions, failing to disclose such acquisitions to the board before signing them; and Oak's aggregate net loss of $227.7 million from 1983 to 1989. Hills had the backing of MIM Ltd., a British investment firm who had acquired a 25 percent stake in ownership in Oak from stocks bought from AlliedSignal twice-removed (AlliedSignal sold their stock in Oak to spinoff Henley Group, who sold it to Itel Corporation, who sold it to MIM).

During a heated two-hour debate in the company's annual meeting, MIM chairman David A. Stevens charged that Oak had treated him with "offhandedness and contempt", indicative of the company's overall treatment of its shareholders, while a smaller stakeholder felt that Oak's $14 fall in the stock market price from 1982 was indicative of the need "to shake things up a little bit". Although McNeely rebuked that he "snatched the company from the jaws of death" and pointed to Oak's improving bottom line and retirement of debt, McNeely was successfully ousted as chairman a week later, with Hills receiving 77 percent of the vote for control of the board. Although embittered, McNeely accepted a director position on Oak's board at Hills's request at the last minute.

Chief executive officer duties were then split between Hills and three other board members, faced with turning around a company that had earned a position on The Wall Street Journal's annual list of the ten worst-run companies. Within two weeks of control, Hills's team hired Rex W. Warden of Aerojet General as president pro tempore of Oak and shut down their TeleFinder division, which was staffed with 45 employees and ran an online classified advertising service. William S. Antle III of the Wayland, Massachusetts–based consulting firm Hadleigh Group replaced Warden by the end of 1989. After assuming control, Antle was faced with the imminent depletion of Oak's cash reserves and had eight weeks to correct the course. After touring all nine of Oak's operating divisions, he commissioned Hadleigh Group to make liquidation plans for seven of them, in the event that the company was forced to divest any due to financial pressures, while ordering the sale of Diamond-H Controls Ltd. (a maker of electric stove components for the European market) and Oak Communications. He also scheduled the relocation of the company's headquarters to Boston, in an attempt to boost morale of the company's employees and to force a reset of the management staff. In February 1990, Oak's California headquarters was put on the market, and the company commenced the move to Waltham, Massachusetts, in Greater Boston, after starting the divestiture of its communications division. The sale of Oak Communications was finalized in May 1990; Lorain Group was named as the buyer, and it became known as OCI Communications after the sale. Lorain sued Oak in 1991 arguing that Oak misrepresented the firm's financial condition and withheld information about a sharp decline in sales, causing it to overpay. (Note: OCI was sold again to the Concord Group in 1991, renamed TV/Com International in 1992, and acquired by Hyundai Electronics in 1995.)

In January 1991, Oak acquired Standard Grigsby for $7.6 million. Standard Grigsby, an Illinois-based switch manufacturer and an old competitor of Oak's, had moved from Arlington Heights to Aurora to Sugar Grove. Oak then rebranded its component manufacturing division to OakGrigsby and shuttered its former headquarters and switch manufacturing plant at Crystal Lake in July 1991, with both of the firm's facilities in that city shuttered. The company's component division was then splintered between Sugar Grove and Standard Grigsby's factory in Ciudad Juárez, Mexico.

Oak finally returned to profitability in the early 1990s, earning $5.6 million in profit for 1991 and $10 million in earnings over $107 million for the first three-quarters of 1992. The company downsized from 2,203 employees total in 1989 to 1,620 in 1992; its divisions then consisted of Harper-Wyman—a maker of controls for gas kitchen appliances—as well as OakGrigsby, Nordco, and the Oak Frequency Control Group (comprising the company's quartz oscillator subsidiaries).

== Final acquisitions and purchase by Corning ==
In following Antle's prescription to acquire companies with good growth potential, Oak in December 1992 acquired Gilbert Engineering, a drawer of aluminum connectors for cable television. Oak's net income reached $26.7 million in 1993—an 85 percent increase year-to-year—and its revenue increased by 53 percent. Gilbert, now an Oak subsidiary, in turn purchased Cable-Con A/S, another cable connector manufacturer based in Denmark. In August 1995, Oak acquired Lasertron Inc., a maker of optical fiber support devices, for $112 million (equivalent to $231 million in 2024). In 1996, the company sold Nordco to Bank One Corporation, having previously determined the subsidiary to not fit Oak's telecommunications focus.

On November 15, 1999, Oak agreed to be purchased by photonics company Corning Inc. for $1.8 billion, amid a wave of consolidation in the optical industry; the deal was completed on January 28, 2000. Before its purchase, Oak employed 3,900. No layoffs were expected as a result of the purchase.

== Legacy ==
In 2016, the Willow Creek Community Church in Crystal Lake, Illinois, laid out plans to the city to acquire Oak Industries's former 193,000-square-foot (17,900 m^{2}) factory on 100 South Main Street, for conversion into a megachurch chapter. The city approved the plan in November 2016; groundbreaking commenced in February 2017 for an opening date that fall. Aaron Shepley, mayor of Crystal Lake, remarked that the factory was integral to the city's history: "I think it's very appropriate that this becomes a center point through Willow Creek's redevelopment. We have been very excited as a City Council about Willow Creek's willingness to re-purpose the building."
