= Pay television =

Subscription-based television services

Pay television, also known as subscription television, premium television or, when referring to an individual service, a premium channel, refers to subscription-based television services, usually provided by multichannel television providers, but also increasingly via digital terrestrial and streaming television services. In the United States, subscription television began in the late 1970s and early 1980s in the form of encrypted analog over-the-air broadcast television which could be decrypted with special equipment. The concept rapidly expanded through the multi-channel transition and into the post-network era. Other regions of the world beyond the United States, such as France (Canal+) and Latin America (via MMDS transmission towers and VHF/UHF) have also offered encrypted analog terrestrial signals available for subscription.

The term is most synonymous with premium entertainment services focused on films or general entertainment programming such as, in the United States, HBO, (along sister channel Cinemax), MGM+, Showtime, and Starz, but such services can also include those devoted to sports, as well as adult entertainment.

== Business model ==
In contrast to most other multichannel television broadcasters, which depend on advertising and carriage fees as their sources of revenue, the majority of pay television services rely almost solely on monthly subscription fees paid by individual customers. As a result, pay television outlets are most concerned with offering content that can justify the cost of the service, which helps to attract new subscribers, and retain existing subscribers.

Many pay television services consist of multiple individual channels, referred to as "multiplex" services (in reference to multiplex cinemas), where a main flagship channel is accompanied by secondary services with distinct schedules focusing on specific genres and audiences (such as multiplexes focusing more on "classic" films, or family-oriented programming), time shifting, or brand licensing deals (such as channels focusing specifically on Disney films (such as the early eras of the Disney Channel), or content from American pay television brands if they do not specifically run their own network in a specific market). Typically, these services are bundled together with the main channel at no additional charge and cannot be purchased separately.

Depending on local regulations, pay television services generally have more lenient content standards because of their relatively narrower distribution, and not being subject to pressure from sponsors to tone down content. As a result, programming is typically aired with limited to no edits for time or, where applicable, mature content such as graphic violence, profanity, nudity, and sexual activity.

As premium television services are commonly devoid of traditional commercial advertising, breaks between programming typically include promotions for upcoming programs, and interstitial segments (such as behind-the-scenes content, interviews, and other feature segments). Some sports-based pay services, however, may feature some commercial advertising, particularly if they simulcast sporting events that are broadcast by advertiser-supported television networks.

In addition, most general interest or movie-based pay services do not adhere to the common top and bottom of the hour scheduling of other cable channels and terrestrial broadcasters. As such, programs often air using either conventional scheduling or have airtimes in five-minute increments (for example, 7:05 a.m. or 4:40 p.m.); since such channels broadcast content without in-program break interruptions, this sometimes leads to extended or abbreviated breaks between programs, depending on when the previous program concludes and when the start time of the next program is. The only universal variation to this is prime time, where the main channel in each pay service's suite usually schedules films to start on the hour.

=== Programming ===
Films comprise much of the content seen on most pay television services, particularly those with a general entertainment format and those that focus exclusively on films. Services often obtain rights to films through exclusive agreements with film distributors. Films acquired during the original term of license agreements with a distributor may also be broadcast as "sub-runs", in which a service holds rights to film long after the conclusion of a distribution agreement (under this arrangement, the pay service that originally licensed the rights to a particular film title, or one other than that which had held rights, may hold the broadcast rights through a library content deal).

Many general interest premium channels also produce original television series. Due to the aforementioned leniency in content standards, they too can contain content that is more mature than those of other cable channels or television networks. These series also tend to be high-budget and aim for critical success in order to attract subscribers: notable premium series, such as Cinemax's Banshee, The Knick, Strike Back, Jett, HBO's Curb Your Enthusiasm, Game of Thrones, Sex and the City, and The Sopranos, and Showtime's Dexter, Homeland, and Weeds, have achieved critical acclaim and have won various television awards. Some premium channels also broadcast television specials, which most commonly consist of concerts and concert films, documentaries, stand-up comedy, and in the past theatrical plays.

Sports programming is also featured on some premium services; HBO was historically known for its broadcasts of boxing, while Showtime and Epix also carry mixed martial arts events. Some general interest premium channels have aired other professional sporting events in the past: HBO for example, carried games from the National Hockey League (NHL), National Basketball Association (NBA) and American Basketball Association (ABA) in its early years, and from 1975 to 1999 aired the Wimbledon tennis tournament. Specialty pay sports channels also exist—often focusing on international sports considered niche to domestic audiences (such as, in the United States, cricket), and are typically sold at a higher expense than traditional premium services. Out-of-market sports packages in North America are multi-channel pay services carrying professional or collegiate sporting events which are sold in a seasonal package. They are typically the most expensive type of pay services, generally running in the range of $35 to $50 per month.

Some pay services also offer pornographic films; Cinemax was, initially, well known for carrying a late-night block of softcore films and series known as "Max After Dark"—a reputation that led to the network often being nicknamed "Skinemax" by viewers. This reputation, however, largely died out by the beginning of the mid-1990s, as Cinemax had recently established a reputation for popular movies and shows, such as Goodfellas being an exclusive premiere on the network in the early 1990s. Cinemax eventually phased out the programming completely in the 2010s, citing that it did not align with its current focus on action programming, and that internet porn and the amount of sexual content in other mainstream premium series (such as Game of Thrones) made a specific block for such content redundant. Specialized channels dedicated to pornographic films also exist, that carry either softcore adult programs (such as Playboy TV), or more hardcore content (such as The Erotic Network and Hustler TV).

== Pricing and packaging ==
Pay television channels come in different price ranges. Many channels carrying advertising combines this income with a lower subscription fee. These are called "mini-pay" channels (a term also used for smaller scale commercial-free pay television services) and are often sold as a part of a package with numerous similarly priced channels. Usually, however, the regular pricing for premium channels ranges from just under $10 to near $25 per month per suite, with lower prices available via bundling options with cable or satellite providers, or special limited offers which are available during free preview periods or before the launch of a network's prestige series. However, some other channels, such as sports and adult networks may ask for monthly pricing that may go as high as near $50 a month. There are also premium television services which are priced significantly higher than the mini-pay channels, but they compensate for their higher price by carrying little or no advertising and also providing a higher quality program output. As advertising sales are sensitive to the business cycle, some broadcasters try to balance them with more stable income from subscriptions.

Some providers offer services owned by the same company in a single package. For example, American satellite provider DirecTV offers the Encore channels along with the Starz multiplex (both owned by Starz Inc. [formerly Lionsgate]) in its "Starz Super Pack"; and The Movie Channel, Flix (owned by Paramount Skydance, and the latter of which continues to be sold in the DirecTV package despite Showtime Networks no longer owning Sundance TV, that channel is now owned by AMC Networks) along with Showtime in its "Showtime Unlimited" package; Cinemax and its multiplex networks, in turn, are almost always packaged with HBO (both owned by Warner Bros. Discovery).

Though selling premium services that are related by ownership as a package is common, that may not always be the situation: for example, in the United States, Cinemax and Encore are optionally sold separately from or in a single package with their respective parent networks HBO and Starz, depending on the service provider. The Movie Channel and Flix meanwhile, are usually sold together with Showtime (all three channels are owned by Paramount Skydance); though subscribers are required to purchase Showtime in order to receive Flix, The Movie Channel does not have such a restriction as a few providers optionally sell that service without requiring a Showtime subscription.

Unlike other cable networks, premium services are almost always subscribed to a la carte, meaning that one can, for example, subscribe to HBO without subscribing to Showtime. However, subscribing to an "individual" service automatically includes access to all of that service's available multiplex channels and, in some cases, access to content via video-on-demand (in the form of a conventional VOD television service, and in some cases, a companion on-demand streaming service as well). Most pay television providers also offer a selection of premium services (for example, the HBO, Showtime and Starz packages) in one bundle at a greatly reduced price than it would cost to purchase each service separately, as an inducement for subscribers to remain with their service provider or for others to induce subscribers into using their service. Similarly, many television providers offer general interest or movie-based premium channels at no additional charge for a trial period, often one to three months, though there have been rare instances of free trials for pay services that last up to one year for newer subscribers to that provider's television service.

== Distribution ==
Pay television has become popular with cable and satellite television. Pay television services often, at least two to three times per year, provide free previews of their services, in order to court potential subscribers by allowing this wider audience to sample the service for a period of days or weeks; these are typically scheduled to showcase major special event programming, such as the pay cable premiere of a blockbuster feature film, the premiere (either a series or season premiere) of a widely anticipated or critically acclaimed original series or occasionally, a high-profile special (such as a music concert).

Subscription services transmitted via analogue terrestrial television have also existed, to varying degrees of success. The most known example of such service in Europe is Canal+ and its scrambled services, which operated in France from 1984 to the 2011 closedown of analogue television, Spain from 1990 to 2005 and Poland from 1995 to 2001. Some American television stations launched pay services (known simply as "subscription television" services) such as SuperTV, Wometco Home Theater, PRISM (which principally operated as a cable service, only being simultaneously carried over-the-air for a short time during the 1980s, and unlike other general-interest pay services accepted outside advertising for broadcast during its sports telecasts), Preview, SelecTV and ON TV in the late 1970s, but those services disappeared as competition from cable television expanded during the 1980s.

In Australia, Foxtel, Optus Television and TransACT are the major pay television distributors, all of which provide cable services in some metropolitan areas, with Foxtel providing satellite service for all other areas where cable is not available. Austar formerly operated as a satellite pay service, until it merged with Foxtel and SelecTV. The major distributors of pay television in New Zealand are Sky Network Television on satellite and Vodafone on cable.

In the 2010s, over-the-top subscription video on demand (SVOD) services distributed via internet video emerged as a major competitor to traditional pay television, with services such as Amazon Prime Video, Hulu, and Netflix gaining prominence. Similarly, to pay television services, their libraries include acquired content (such as films and television series), and a mix of original series, films, specials, and live sporting events. The shift towards SVOD has resulted in increasing competition within the sector, with media conglomerates having launched their own services (such as Disney+, Paramount+, Peacock, and Disney's acquisition of the majority and subsequently entire of Hulu) to compete, and existing premium networks such as HBO (HBO Now) and Showtime launching direct-to-consumer versions of their existing services to appeal to cord cutters. HBO and Showtime later absorbed their DTC offerings into wider services with a focus on their parent companies' libraries, with HBO Now replaced by HBO Max in 2020 (which adds content from other Warner Bros. properties and third-parties, and would also be included with existing HBO subscriptions via television providers), and Showtime formally merging with Paramount+ in 2023. Canadian premium service The Movie Network similarly merged with the CraveTV service owned by parent company Bell Media in 2018.

== Ambiguities ==
=== Pay-per-view ===
Pay-per-view (PPV) services are similar to subscription-based pay television services in that customers must pay to have the broadcast decrypted for viewing, but usually only entail a one-time payment for a single or time-limited viewing. Programs offered via pay-per-view are most often movies or sporting events, but may also include other events, such as concerts and even softcore adult programs. In the U.S., the initial concept and technology for pay-per-view for broadcast television was first developed in the early 1950s, including a crude decrypting of the over-the-air television signal and a decoding box, but never caught on for use at that time. It took another four decades when cable broadcasters started using pay-per-view on a widespread basis.

=== Free-to-view ===
"Free" variants are free-to-air (FTA) and free-to-view (FTV); however, FTV services are normally encrypted and decryption cards either come as part of an initial subscription to a pay television bouquet – in other words, an offer of pay-TV channels – or can be purchased for a one-time cost. FTA and FTV systems may still have selective access. ABC Australia is one example, as much of its programming content is free-to-air except for National Rugby League (NRL) games, which are encrypted.

== Over-the-air subscription television ==
- ON TV, an over-the-air subscription service that served Chicago, Cincinnati, Dallas/Fort Worth, Detroit, Fort Lauderdale, Phoenix, Salem/Portland and San Francisco.
- PRISM, an over-the-air and cable television subscription service that served Southeastern Pennsylvania, Southern New Jersey, Delaware and the Delmarva Peninsula.
- SelecTV, an over-the-air subscription service that served Los Angeles, Milwaukee and Philadelphia and later the Wometco Home Theater territories after WHT ceased its own programming.
- Spectrum (TV channel), an over-the-air subscription service that served, in early 1980s, the Chicago, Fairbanks, and Minneapolis–St. Paul.
- SuperTV, an over-the-air subscription service that served Washington, D.C., the Capital and Central regions of Maryland and Northern Virginia.
- Tele1st - served Chicago, Illinois
- Wometco Home Theater – an over-the-air subscription service that served New York City, Northern and Central New Jersey, Long Island, and Fairfield County, Connecticut.

== See also ==
- List of cable television companies
- List of satellite television companies
- Satellite television by region
- Terrestrial television
- Out-of-market sports package
- Pay-per-view
- Cable television piracy
- Pirate decryption
- Premium segment
- Video on demand
- Pay television in the United States
- United States pay television content advisory system
- Subscription television in the Philippines
