= Texas State Highway 352 =

Highway in Texas

State Highway 352
- SH 352, highlighted in red

Route information
- Maintained by TxDOT
- Length: 13.619 mi (21.918 km)
- Existed: 1943–present

Major junctions
- West end: I-30 in Dallas
- I-635 in Mesquite
- East end: US 80 in Sunnyvale

Location
- Country: United States
- State: Texas

Highway system
- Highways in Texas; Interstate; US; State; Former; Toll; Loops; Spurs; FM/RM; Park; Rec
| ← SH 351 | → SH 353 |

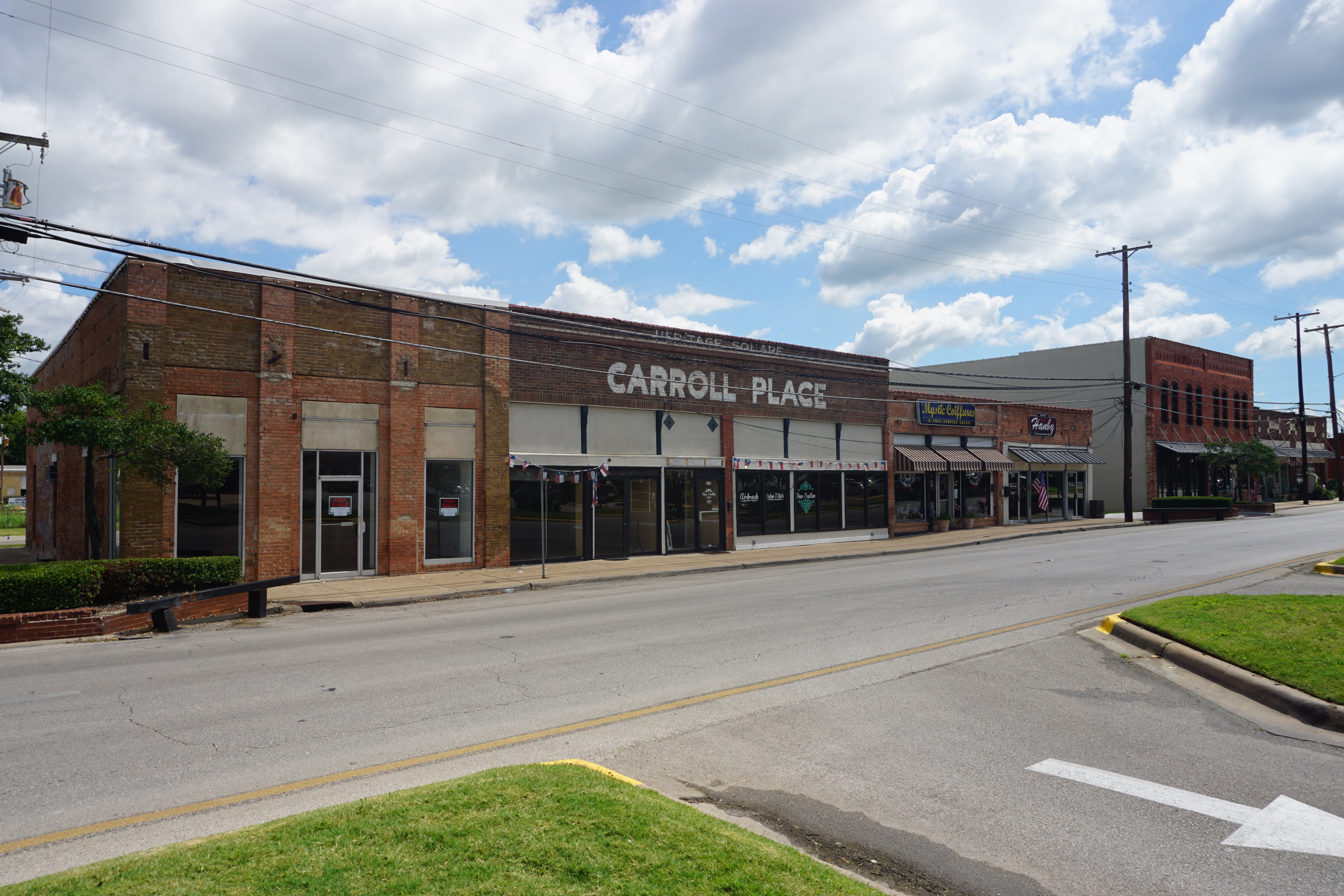
State Highway 352 as Main Street in Mesquite

State Highway 352 (SH 352) is a Texas state highway running from Dallas east through Mesquite before finally ending in Sunnyvale. The route mainly runs along Scyene Rd. The highway was designated on October 6, 1943 from U.S. Highway 80 in Mesquite west to U.S. Highway 175 southeast of Dallas, replacing part of SH 183 when it was relocated to the north, and was extended into Dallas on February 17, 1964 when US 175 was relocated to the west. On June 25, 1991, the section of SH 352 from I-30 to the old route of US 80 was cancelled and removed from the state highway system.

Part of State Highway 352 runs in front of the State Fair of Texas, over a stretch named Robert B. Cullum Boulevard.

== Route description ==
SH 352 begins where Parry Avenue changes into Robert B. Cullum Boulevard at 1st and 2nd Avenues, a pair of one-way streets that give the highway a connection to I-30. SH 352 travels in a southeastern direction along Robert B. Cullum Boulevard on the southwestern edge of the State Fair of Texas. The highway makes a sharp turn into a more direct eastern direction near 2nd Avenue, where the road name changes to Scyene Road. SH 352 crosses over White Rock Creek and travels through a less densely populated area of the city in the Parkdale neighborhood. Near McNeil Street, the highway turns northeast onto Scyene Circle, a newer routing of SH 352, then turns back east onto Scyene Road near Pleasant Drive; the two roads, Scyene Circle and Scyene Road, provide access between SH 352 and Loop 12 (Bucker Boulevard). SH 352 runs through eastern Dallas then enters into Mesquite at the intersection with Sam Houston Road.

Entering Mesquite, SH 352 passes near West Mesquite High School and Mesquite Memorial Stadium. Just east of Peachtree Road, the highway splits into a pair of one-way streets, with eastbound traffic traveling along Military Parkway and westbound on Scyene Road. SH 352 intersects I-635 (Lyndon B. Johnson Freeway) then travels through a less developed part of Mesquite with industrial areas until reaching Carmack Street. At Carmack Street, the eastbound round changes names to Davis Street while serving as the western terminus for Main Street, which carries westbound traffic. The highway enters Old Town Mesquite and travels through the town square where it meets Galloway Avenue and Belt Line Road. Leaving the downtown area, SH 352 travels along the northern boundaries of Mesquite High School and E. H. Hanby Stadium.

At Pioneer Road, the highway turns northeast while the Davis/Main Street roadway continues east as East Glen Boulevard. SH 352 travels through a rural area of Mesquite then enters Sunnyvale near Long Creek Road. In Sunnyvale, the highway's name becomes South Collins Road and the route becomes more developed with commercial areas and restaurants. SH 352 passes Baylor Scott & White Medical Center – Sunnyvale before ending at US 80 with the road continuing as North Collins Road.

== History ==
SH 352 was designated in 1943 from US 80 east of Mesquite to US 175 near Fair Park in Dallas, replacing a section of SH 183. In 1964, the highway was extended further into Dallas to US 80 in Deep Ellum over the old routing of US 175 through Fair Park when that highway was re-routed along the C. F. Hawn Freeway. The western terminus of SH 352 was truncated to I-30 in 1991, removing the section of highway along 1st and 2nd Avenues.

== Major junctions ==
The entire route is in Dallas County.

| Location | mi | km | Destinations | Notes |
|---|---|---|---|---|
| Dallas | 0.000 | 0.000 | I-30 (East R.L. Thornton Freeway) | Western terminus |
| Dallas | 5.6 | 9.0 | Loop 12 (Buckner Boulevard) | Interchange |
| Mesquite | 9.3 | 15.0 | I-635 (Lyndon B. Johnson Freeway) | Exit 4 (I-635) |
| Mesquite | 10.7 | 17.2 | Belt Line Road | |
| Sunnyvale | 13.619 | 21.918 | US 80 – Dallas, Forney | Eastern terminus; continues north as Collins Road |
1.000 mi = 1.609 km; 1.000 km = 0.621 mi
