= Hughes Memorial Tower =

Radio tower in Washington, DC

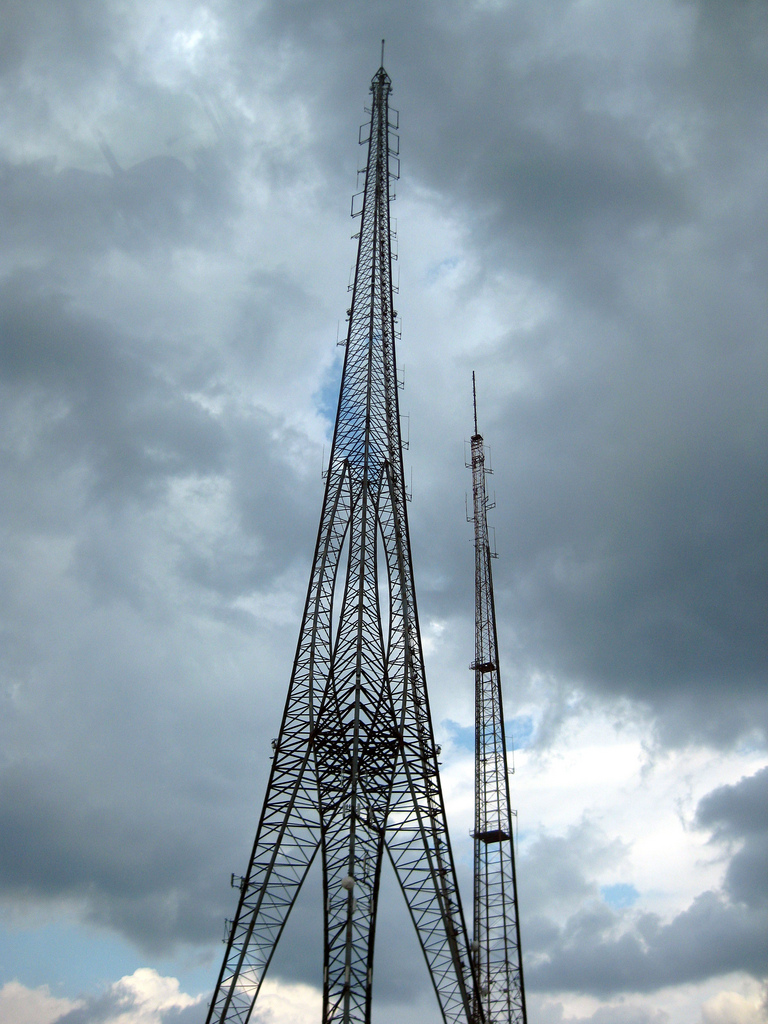
- Hughes Memorial Tower (left)

- Location within District of Columbia

General information
- Type: Radio tower
- Location: 6001 Georgia Avenue, Washington, D.C., United States
- Coordinates: 38°57′44″N 77°1′35″W
- Elevation: 288 feet (88 m)
- Completed: January 15, 1989
- Owner: District of Columbia Office of Property Management

Height
- Height: 761 feet (232 m)

The Hughes Memorial Tower is a radio tower in Washington, D.C., at 6001 Georgia Avenue, near the intersection of 9th Street NW and Peabody Street NW. At 761 ft (232 m), it is the tallest structure of any kind in the district, surpassing the Washington Monument by more than 200 ft (61 m) and the WTTG Television Tower by 55 ft (17 m). It is the second-tallest freestanding structure in the Baltimore-Washington metropolitan area, after the 809-foot tall River Road Tower in Bethesda, Maryland.

Completed on January 15, 1989, the tower sits at 38°57′47″N 77°1′36″W and at an elevation of 87.7 m (288 ft) above mean sea level. The tower is located on a relatively high spot just off Georgia Avenue NW, in Washington's Brightwood neighborhood, several miles from the city's main cluster of transmission towers in the Tenleytown neighborhood. Except for the 504-foot tower next to it, there are no nearby large structures. For these reasons, as well as its distinctive shape and large size, the tower is visible from a variety of locations in the District of Columbia and suburban Maryland.

The tower is owned by the District of Columbia Department of General Services, Portfolio Division. It is used for radio communication by the Washington, D.C., police and fire departments. Until January 2018, it transmitted the WDCW Channel 50 television signal.

The three-legged, free-standing star tower shares its design with the Star Tower in Cincinnati, Ohio. It was designed by Texas engineer Henry “Hank” McGinnis, who worked in the Landmark or Adelphon style. It was built by the Landmark Tower Company and named for John S. Hughes, an Assistant D.C. Police Chief who had led the department's adoption of communications technology.

The tower has ten daytime strobe beacons on the tower's legs: one beacon per 200 ft (61 m) plus one at the top of the WDCW antenna. The beacons flash at 1.5-second intervals. At nighttime, it flashes red warning navigation lights. The design includes an ichthys, or Jesus fish, developed from early sketches of the structure.

In 1998, the National Capital Planning Commission approved a plan to use the Hughes Memorial Tower as part of a 9-1-1 service upgrade. In doing so, it noted that the tower was constructed without its prior permission and that it has caused "concern about the effect of the tower on the views of the major monuments and memorials in the Nation's Capital." The tower has also been criticized by Ward 4 residents because the police "frequently have to close the streets next to this tower because of the risk[s] posed by falling ice" in winter.

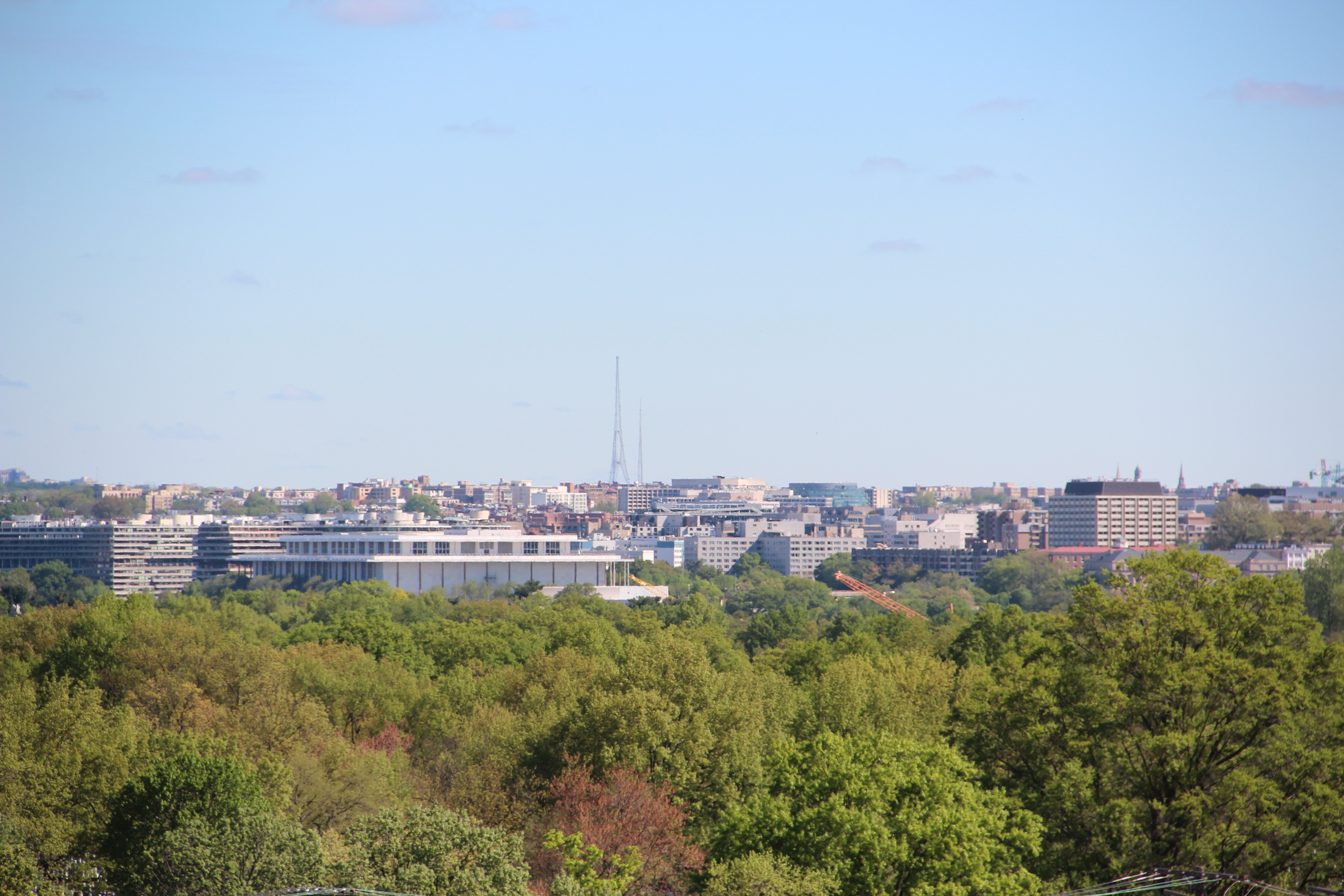
The Hughes Memorial Tower viewed from the United States Air Force Memorial in Arlington

== See also ==
- Lattice tower
- Landmark Tower Company
- List of famous transmission sites
- List of tallest buildings in Washington, D.C.
