= Energy Plaza =

Skyscraper in Dallas, Texas

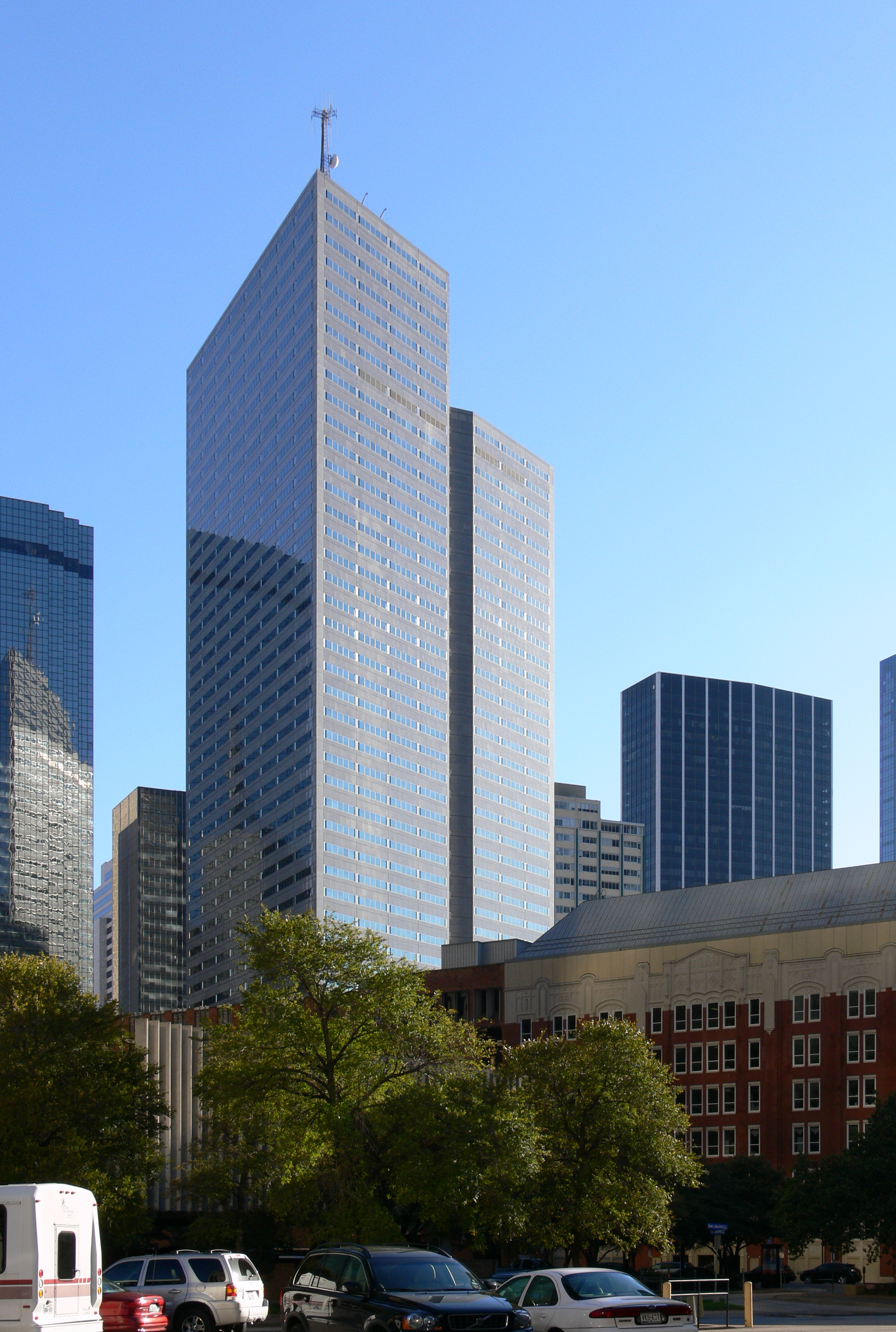
- Interactive map of the Energy Plaza area
- Alternative names: Arco Tower

General information
- Type: Commercial offices
- Location: 1601 Bryan Street; Dallas, Texas, United States
- Coordinates: 32.7831°N 96.7991°W
- Construction started: 1980
- Completed: 1983
- Owner: Todd Interests

Height
- Antenna spire: 225.6 m (740 ft)
- Roof: 192 m (630 ft)

Technical details
- Floor count: 49

Design and construction
- Architect: I.M. Pei & Partners
- Structural engineer: Weiskopf & Pickworth; Cosentini Associates

Energy Plaza is a skyscraper in the City Center District of downtown Dallas, Texas, United States, north of Thanks-Giving Square at 1601 Bryan Street. Designed by I.M. Pei and Partners, the building is 192 m (630 ft) and 49 stories, making it the ninth-tallest building in Dallas.

The building itself is based on a design using three triangles. The communications tower at the top of the building is a small version of the Star Tower broadcast tower line from Landmark Tower Company, which went bankrupt after its owner and chief design engineer died from a heart attack in 2002.

Construction on the building began in May 1980 and the building opened in August 1983 for the Atlantic Richfield Company to be used as their regional headquarters. The structure's original name was the ARCO Tower. Energy Future Holdings, Oncor Electric Delivery, and FuelcoLLC.com, are the primary tenants. Other notable tenants include Civitas Capital Management LLC. The building is connected to the Dallas Pedestrian Network and the Bullington Truck Terminal.

== See also ==
- List of tallest buildings in Dallas
