= List of highways numbered 352 =

The following highways are numbered 352:

== Canada ==
- Manitoba Provincial Road 352
- Newfoundland and Labrador Route 352
- Prince Edward Island Route 352
- Quebec Route 352

== India ==
- National Highway 352 (India)

== Japan ==
- Japan National Route 352

== United States ==
- Arkansas Highway 352
- Georgia State Route 352
- Indiana State Road 352
- Maryland Route 352
- New York:
  - New York State Route 352
    - New York State Route 352 (former)
  - County Route 352 (Albany County, New York)
- Pennsylvania Route 352
- Puerto Rico Highway 352
- Tennessee State Route 352
- Texas State Highway 352
- Virginia State Route 352
- Wyoming Highway 352

Preceded by 351	Lists of highways 352	Succeeded by 353
