= Haidari Flag crusade =

- Part of the Sikh rising in the Punjab
Date	September–October 1710
Location	Majha, Riarki, Lahore district, Qila Bhagwant Rai (near Bharat on the Ravi), Kotla Begam near Chamiari, and Bhilowal
Result	Sikh victory: Crusading forces defeated and dispersed; Sikh control extended across much of Majha and Riarki
Territorial changes	Sikhs occupied Batala, Kalanaur, Pathankot, and much of Kasur.

Belligerents
Sikhs	Muslim crusaders of Lahore; Mughal provincial forces of Lahore; Hindu allies

Commanders and leaders
Banda Singh Bahadur (overall leadership; not present at Kotla Begam/Bhilowal); Local Sikh leaders Sikhs of Sitthala and Botala	Sayyad Aslam Khan; Muhammad Taqi; Musa Beg Lechani; Mir Ata Ullah; Mahabat Khan Kharrel; Haji Sayyad Ismail; Haji Yar Beg; Shah Inayat; Mulla Pir Muhammad; Muhammad Zaman; Grandson of Todar Mal †; Murtaza Khan †

Strength
About 8,000 Sikhs assembled at Amritsar	Thousands of Muslim crusaders and Ghazis under the Haidari Flag; Aslam Khan Force: 500 horse and 1,000 foot

Casualties and losses
Heavy losses	Heavy losses

The Haidari Flag crusade or War of the Haidari Flag was a series of clashes in 1710 between Sikh forces and a coalition raised at Lahore during the Sikh rising in Punjab. The fighting followed the Sikh victory at Sirhind and took place mainly in Majha, Riarki, and the Lahore district. The principal engagements were fought at Qila Bhagwant Rai, Kotla Begam, and Bhilowal. The campaign ended with the defeat and dispersal of the Haidari Flag forces, while Sikh control expanded across much of Majha and Riarki. Lahore itself was not occupied.

== Background ==
The Sikh victory at Sirhind was followed by a wider rising in Punjab. Hukamnamas were issued in the name of Banda Singh Bahadur to the Khalsa north of the Sutlej, calling on them to attack Mughal-held territories. Sikh groups from Majha and nearby areas assembled at Amritsar before moving into the countryside.

The first Sikh advances were directed north-east rather than against the stronger centres of Lahore and Kasur. Sikh forces occupied Batala and Kalanaur, removed government officials, and established their own thanas there. Other groups moved farther north and occupied Pathankot and its surrounding territory.

After Batala and Kalanaur had been taken, Sikh forces moved toward Lahore. Their raids reached the Shalamar Garden and the outer limits of the city.

=== Mobilization at Lahore ===
The Sikh advance caused alarm in Lahore. Sayyad Aslam Khan, the deputy of Prince Muiz-ud-Din, did not initially move out to oppose them in open battle.

Religious leaders and notables in Lahore then organized a jihad against the Sikhs. A green standard, called the Haiadri Flag or Haidari Jhanda, was raised near the Idgah mosque. Merchants, preachers, and other leading Muslims joined the mobilization, and some Hindu officials also took part. Aslam Khan later sent cavalry and infantry under Ata Ullah and Muhib Khan Kharal to join the force.

== Siege of Qila Bhagwant Rai ==
The Sikh forces were divided into four jathas: one for Majha, one for Riarki and Kandhi, one for the investment of Lahore, and one as a reserve. The Lahore section occupied a small brick fort at Bharat on the Ravi. The fort had been built by Bhagwant Rai, the qanungo of the parganah.

The Haidari Flag and Mughal forces closely invested the fort. The Sikh defenders fired from the walls and bastions, inflicting losses on attackers who approached the gates. Since the besieging force was too large to be driven off, the Sikhs abandoned the fort during the night and broke through the encirclement. The besiegers retreated to Lahore without destroying the Sikh force.

== Battle of Kotla Begam ==
After the return to Lahore, members of the Haidari Flag force insulted Hindus in the city and threatened Mughal officials. The Sikhs then gathered again at Kotla Begam, near Chamiari, and resumed attacks in the surrounding area. A second Jihad was proclaimed, and another large force marched out against them.

On the march to Kotla Begam, parts of the Haidari Flag force plundered villages and abused the rural population. Several offenders were executed by order of their own leaders, but discipline did not improve. When the force reached Kotla Begam, the Sikhs came out to meet it in the open. The engagement was hard fought, and both sides suffered heavy losses.

The battle turned when Afghan horsemen withdrew from the field. The remaining force was unable to hold its position and collapsed by nightfall.

== Sikh counter-offensive at Bhilowal ==
The defeated force withdrew toward Lahore and halted for the night at Bhilowal. Regular troops were lodged in the fort, while many others slept in the open. The Sikhs followed the retreating force and attacked before daybreak from nearby cover.

The Haidari Flag forces failed to form a united front. The retreat became a rout, and many men were killed. Several hundred died, including Murtaza Khan and the grandson of Todar Mal, who led the Hindu allies. Horses and property also fell into Sikh hands.

== Aftermath ==
The defeat at Bhilowal ended the campaign. The Haidari Flag force dispersed, and its leaders returned to Lahore in defeat. Sikh forces then extended their control across Majha and Riarki, while Lahore remained outside Sikh occupation.

== Bibliography ==
- Gandhi, Surjit Singh (1999). Sikhs in the Eighteenth Century: Their Struggle for Survival and Supremacy. Singh Bros. ISBN 9788172052171.
- Gupta, Hari Ram (1978). History of the Sikhs: Evolution of Sikh Confederacies, 1708–1769. Vol. 2 (3rd illustrated ed.). Munshiram Manoharlal Publishers.
- Sagoo, Harbans Kaur (2001). Banda Singh Bahadur and Sikh Sovereignty (illustrated ed.). Deep & Deep Publications. ISBN 9788176293006.
- Singh, Ganda (1990). Life of Banda Singh Bahadur: Based on Contemporary and Original Records. Publication Bureau, Punjabi University.
- Singha, H. S. (2000). The Encyclopedia of Sikhism (over 1000 Entries). Hemkunt Press. ISBN 9788170103011.
