= KEOM =

High school radio station in Mesquite, Texas

- Mesquite, Texas; United States
- Broadcast area: Parts of Dallas, Kaufman, Rockwall, Collin, Hunt, Ellis, Tarrant, and Denton counties
- Frequency: 88.5 MHz (HD Radio)
- RDS: 1. KEOM 88.5; 2. Your Community Leader
- Branding: KEOM 88.5 Your Community Leader

Programming
- Language: English
- Format: Classic hits (Community)
- Affiliations: Texas State Network

Ownership
- Owner: Mesquite Independent School District

History
- First air date: September 4, 1984
- Former frequencies: 88.3 MHz (1984–1992)
- Call sign meaning: Education of Mesquite

Technical information
- Licensing authority: FCC
- Facility ID: 41307
- Class: C1
- ERP: 61,000 watts
- HAAT: 175 meters (574 ft)
- Transmitter coordinates: 32°45′46″N 96°38′4″W

Links
- Public license information: Public file; LMS
- Webcast: Listen live
- Website: keom.fm

KEOM (88.5 FM) is a non-commercial educational high school radio station based in Mesquite, Texas. It is operated by the Mesquite Independent School District and broadcasts to the greater Dallas–Fort Worth Metroplex. The station's studios are located on East Davis Street in Mesquite, while its transmitter, the Mesquite Tower, is located behind Mesquite Memorial Stadium.

KEOM broadcasts in HD Radio.

== History ==
The station was founded by Dr. Ralph Poteet, former MISD Superintendent, to present community information in a way not possible via commercial radio stations, and to provide MISD students having interest in radio and communications with hands-on radio experience. The air staff is primarily made up of students from the five high schools in the city taking radio production classes.

The station signed on the air September 4, 1984, on 88.3 FM with 3,000 watts on a 250-foot (76 m) tower. It moved to 88.5 and increased its power to 61,000 watts in 1992 upon the completion of a new 514-foot-tall (157 m) City/School Communications Tower, a distinctive Landmark tower, at Mesquite Memorial Stadium.

== Programming ==
KEOM airs live broadcasts of high school sports from MISD schools. The 24-hour station also broadcasts music primarily from the 1970s to the 1990s. KEOM plays the U.S. National Anthem every morning at 7 a.m.

KEOM is one of a few secondary stations containing the North Texas Emergency Alert System that sends messages from primaries WBAP and KSCS.

Comparing KEOM and KSPF, its competitor in the Dallas area, the station contains a more enhanced and larger playlist than KSPF, the other Classic Hits station utilizing significantly more repetitions and having a more power songs-oriented playlist than KEOM.

== Awards and honors ==
The station was named "Best Blast from the Past" in the 2007 Dallas Observer "Best of Dallas" rankings.

== Signal ==
Unlike most of the area's FM stations like competitor KSPF, which transmit their signals from Cedar Hill, KEOM transmits its signal from an area southwest of Mesquite. Its signal is also highly directional, transmitting very little signal directly to the west. Therefore, KEOM's signal is much stronger in most of Dallas County as well as the cities in the eastern portion of the Dallas/Fort Worth Metroplex including Waxahachie, McKinney, and Terrell to as far east as Canton, but is considerably weaker west of DFW.

== See also ==
- List of community radio stations in the United States
