= List of highways numbered 350 =

The following highways are numbered 350:

== Canada ==
- Manitoba Provincial Road 350
- New Brunswick Route 350
- Newfoundland and Labrador Route 350
- Prince Edward Island Route 350
- Quebec Route 350
- Saskatchewan Highway 350

== Japan ==
- Japan National Route 350

== United Kingdom ==
- A350 road, Poole to Chippenham, Wiltshire

== United States ==
- U.S. Route 350
- Arkansas Highway 350
- Georgia State Route 350 (former)
- Indiana State Road 350
- Louisiana Highway 350
- Maryland Route 350
- Mississippi Highway 350
- Missouri Route 350
- New York:
  - New York State Route 350
  - County Route 350 (Erie County, New York)
- Ohio State Route 350
- Oregon Route 350
- Pennsylvania Route 350
- Tennessee State Route 350
- Texas:
  - Texas State Highway 350
  - Farm to Market Road 350
- Virginia State Route 350
  - Virginia State Route 350 (former)
- Wyoming Highway 350

Preceded by 349	Lists of highways 350	Succeeded by 351
