= Mesquite Tower =

- Mesquite Tower from below

- Location within Texas
- Location: Mesquite, Dallas County, Texas
- Tower height: 514 feet (157 m)
- Coordinates: 32°45′46″N 96°38′05″W
- Built: August 1990

Mesquite Tower is a free-standing lattice tower located in Mesquite, Texas, United States, that is 514 feet (157 m) tall. It is the tallest structure in the city and a well known local landmark. The tower features a unique design called a Landmark or Adelphon tower and was built in 1990. It stands between West Mesquite High School and Memorial Stadium. Owned by the Mesquite Independent School District, it is a 61,000 watt radio tower used by the radio station KEOM which is operated by the school district.

== See also ==
- List of towers
