= Kalanaur, Gurdaspur =

Kalanaur
- City
- Location within Punjab Location within India
- Coordinates: 32.01°N 75.09°E
- Country: India
- State: Punjab
- District: Gurdaspur
- Assembly constituency: Dera Baba Nanak Assembly Constituency

Population (2011)
  - Total: 12,915
- Demonym: Kalanaurie

Languages
  - Official: Punjabi
- Time zone: UTC+5:30 (IST)
- PIN: 143512
- Telephone code: 91 1874 XXX XXX
- Vehicle registration: PB-85

Kalanaur is a tehsil in Gurdaspur District of Punjab state in India. It is located 25 km towards west from District headquarters Gurdaspur. This historical town is situated on the newly constructed National Highway 354. The town has historical significance as Mughal Emperor Akbar was enthroned in a garden near Kalanaur by Bairam Khan. It was first established as a principality by Prince Nakhashena, a brother of King Janamejaya, which was further ruled by his descendants known as Jarral Rajputs. Jarral rule in Kalanaur lasted for 350 years.

== Demographics ==
As per the 2011 census of India, Kalanaur has a population of 13642. Males constitute 52% of the population and females 48%. Those under 6 years of age constitute 10.76% of the population. The average literacy rate is 83.97%, which is higher than the Punjab average of 75.84%. Male literacy is at 87.35%, and female literacy at 80.28%.

== Geography ==
Kalanaur is located at 32.01°N 75.09°E. It has an average elevation of 243 metres (797 feet). The town is situated about 25 km to the west of Gurdaspur city, on the banks of the Kiran, a minor rivulet that merges into the Ravi River.

== History ==
Prince "Nakshasena" established a separate independent kingdom at Indraprastha, which later rose to become a dominant force in its own right.

With the passage of time, the Bactrian and Scythian invasions of northern India, this Pandava branch established a kingdom at Kalanaur in what is now the modern-day district of Gurdaspur in Punjab (India) establishing the first capital of the Jarral Dynasty.

Jarral Rajputs are known as the descendants of the Pandavas and their branch was named after their apical ancestor, Raja Jir Rao, a Rajput descendant of the Pandavas of the Mahabharata. The "Jarrals" are therefore a "brother tribe" to the Janjua Rajputs of Punjab.

Kalanaur was later captured in the twelfth century by the armies of the Ghorid Empire after a battle with the Jarral Rajas. During the 14th-16th centuries, Kalanaur was a major urban centre and several historical events are associated with the town. Firuz Shah Tughluq (1352–88) built a beautiful palace on the banks of the Kiran rivulet. During the reign of Sayyid Mubarak Shah (1421–35), Kalanaur was ruled by the Khokhar Rajput tribe under the leadership of Raja Jasrat. In February 1556, Mughal Emperor Akbar was enthroned in a garden near Kalanaur by Bairam Khan. The masonry platform where he was crowned can be visited even today. There is a mosque that was built during his reign.

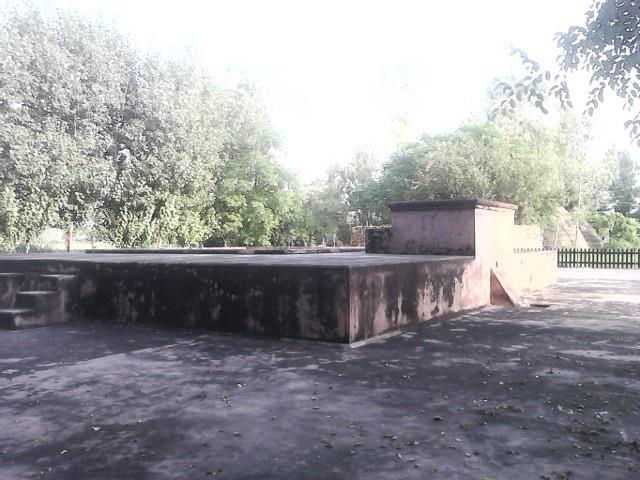
This is the crowning platform of the Mughal emperor "Akbar the Great" at Kalanaur, district Gurdaspur in Punjab

During the period of anarchy in the latter half of the 18th century, the Kanhaiya Misl, a militia under Sardar Haqeeqat Singh Kanhaiya, occupied Kalanaur. His son Jaimal Singh extended his territory up to Fatehgarh Churian and shifted his residence there. Jaimal Singh's daughter Chand Kaur was married to Kharak Singh, eldest son and heir of Ranjit Singh, in 1812. Later, when the area was annexed by Ranjit Singh, he granted it to Kharak Singh. It was later granted in fief to one Raja Dina Nath, and was finally annexed into British India after the death of Divan Dina Nath in 1857.

== Culture ==
Kalanaur was at one time a centre of art, trade and cottage industry. A local saying has it that "a person who has not seen Lahore should see Kalanaur" ("Jinne nahi vekheya lahore, oh vekhe kalanaur").

The Gurudwara Banda Bahadur, built on the site of a well excavated by the order of Banda Bahadur, is another landmark of the town. There is also a temple of Shiva and a mosque built during the reign of Mughal Emperor Akbar.

== Education ==
The list of major educational institutions in Kalanaur is given below.

- Sahibzada Zorawar Singh Fateh Singh Senior Secondary Public School, Affiliated to CBSE, New Delhi
- Government Industrial Training Institute (ITI), Kalanaur
- Gagan International School
- Government Middle School, Kalanaur
- DAV High School
- Government Senior Secondary School, Kalanaur
- Kerala International School, Kalanaur
