= List of highways numbered 351 =

The following highways are numbered 351:

== Canada ==
- Manitoba Provincial Road 351
- Newfoundland and Labrador Route 351
- Prince Edward Island Route 351
- Quebec Route 351

== Cuba ==
- Calzada de Jústiz (2–351)

== Japan ==
- Japan National Route 351

== India ==
- National Highway 351

== United States ==
- Arkansas Highway 351
- County Road 351 (Dixie County, Florida)
  - County Road 351A (Dixie County, Florida)
- Georgia State Route 351 (former)
- Illinois Route 351
- Kentucky Route 351
- Louisiana Highway 351
- Maryland Route 351
- New York:
  - New York State Route 351
    - New York State Route 351 (former)
  - County Route 351 (Albany County, New York)
- Oklahoma State Highway 351 also known as Muskogee Turnpike
- Oregon Route 351
- Pennsylvania Route 351
- Puerto Rico Highway 351
- Tennessee State Route 351
- Texas State Highway 351
- Virginia State Route 351
  - Virginia State Route 351 (former)
- Wisconsin Highway 351 (former)
- Wyoming Highway 351

Preceded by 350	Lists of highways 351	Succeeded by 352
