= WNAC-TV =

Television station in Providence, Rhode Island

- Providence, Rhode Island; New Bedford, Massachusetts; United States
- City: Providence, Rhode Island
- Channels: Digital: 12 (VHF); Virtual: 64
- Branding: Fox Providence; The CW Providence (64.2)

Programming
- Affiliations: 64.1: Fox; 64.2: The CW; for others, see § Subchannels

Ownership
- Owner: Mission Broadcasting, Inc.
- Operator: Nexstar Media Group
- Sister stations: WPRI-TV

History
- First air date: December 1981 (Note: There is uncertainty in published sources as to when WSTG began broadcasting. The Television and Cable Factbook states September 1, 1981. The Broadcasting Yearbook states December 1981. A January 8, 1982, article in The Providence Journal hints at the station beginning programming late December 1981, and another indicates it was testing that November.)
- Former call signs: WSTG (1981–1985); WSTG-TV (1985–1986)
- Former channel numbers: Analog: 64 (UHF, 1981–2009); Digital: 54 (UHF, 2004–2009)
- Former affiliations: Independent (1981–1986); MyNetworkTV (secondary, 2006–2009; 64.2, 2009–2017)
- Call sign meaning: Originally used by Boston station WNAC-TV (1948-1982), now WHDH-TV

Technical information
- Licensing authority: FCC
- Facility ID: 73311
- ERP: 30 kW
- HAAT: 305 m (1,001 ft)
- Transmitter coordinates: 41°52′36″N 71°16′55″W

Links
- Public license information: Public file; LMS
- Website: 64.1: foxprovidence.com; 64.2: thecwprov.com

WNAC-TV (channel 64), branded as Fox Providence, is a television station in Providence, Rhode Island, United States, affiliated with Fox and The CW. It is owned by Mission Broadcasting and operated by Nexstar Media Group alongside CBS affiliate WPRI-TV (channel 12). The two stations share studios on Catamore Boulevard in East Providence, Rhode Island; WNAC-TV's transmitter is located on Homestead Avenue in Rehoboth, Massachusetts.

The license history of WNAC-TV stretches back to WNET (channel 16), the second TV station in Providence, which operated from 1954 to 1955 amid an unsuccessful multi-year fight to prevent channel 12 from going on the air. The station successfully appealed a 1969 action to delete its construction permit, but in that time it lost its call letters and its channel and was reassigned to channel 64. The permit was acquired by Subscription Television of America in 1978 and returned to air as WSTG in 1981. The new owners intended to broadcast part-time subscription television service but never did so; the station operated on a very limited basis while a buyer was sought.

Providence Television acquired WSTG in 1984 and relaunched it that September as the Providence market's first independent station. It struggled to attract viewers used to watching the independents from the adjacent Boston market and filed for bankruptcy reorganization in 1986. Sudbrink Broadcasting purchased it out of bankruptcy and affiliated it with the Fox network when it launched; the new owners raised channel 64's local profile by airing University of Rhode Island Rams men's basketball and benefited from the growth of Fox. Ratings and revenue improved under Sudbrink and the next three owners: Price Communications, Northstar Television Group, and Argyle Television.

In 1996, Argyle entered into a local marketing agreement with Clear Channel Communications, then-owner of WPRI-TV. A 10 p.m. newscast for the station debuted the following January; the news offering expanded with the creation of morning and early evening newscasts in the late 2000s. After several changes in ownership of WPRI-TV, the license for WNAC-TV was transferred to a family member of an executive of Providence-based LIN Broadcasting, which owned channel 12 in the 2000s and early 2010s, and to Mission Broadcasting in 2021. The CW moved to a subchannel of WNAC-TV in 2017.

== Prior history of this license ==
The broadcast license of WNAC-TV is the second-oldest in Rhode Island television and dates to the launch of WNET (channel 16), which began offering network programs on April 5, 1954, and local programs on May 2. It was owned by Channel 16 of Rhode Island, a merger of two applicants that had applied to the Federal Communications Commission (FCC) for the channel. WNET provided programs from CBS, ABC, and the DuMont Television Network, as well as local programs from its studios at the transmitter site in Rehoboth.

As an ultra high frequency (UHF) station, WNET was at a significant economic disadvantage. When it went on the air, only about 25,000 homes could tune its signal compared to the 217,000 Rhode Island families that had TV sets. Many televisions needed converters to view WNET. This economic reality led Channel 16 of Rhode Island to vigorously protest and seek to block the construction of a second very high frequency (VHF) television station in Providence on channel 12. In October 1953, the FCC barred Cherry & Webb, the permittee of WPRO-TV, from beginning broadcasting until it conducted a hearing on the economic injury claims made by Channel 16 of Rhode Island. WNET stated it was losing $11,000 ($104,476 in 2025 dollars) a month.

In early 1955, the FCC approved construction of WPRO-TV, which went on the air on March 27. WNET cut all of its local programs in May and folded on July 10, citing a lack of viewer and sponsor interest in UHF. An attempt to have a VHF channel inserted at Westerly for its use failed; litigation with Cherry & Webb stretched into 1957 before the parties reached a settlement.

Despite being off the air, Channel 16 of Rhode Island continued maintaining the Rehoboth transmitter facility. Harold Arcaro acquired the facility in 1965 as well as an adjoining 10 acres (4.0 ha) of land. The FCC deleted WNET's construction permit and call letters in April 1969 after it determined that the company's refusal to build in light of a ruling on cable television signals was a business decision. Channel 16 of Rhode Island successfully appealed the deletion in court and had its permit reinstated in 1971. During that two-year period, the FCC awarded the WNET call letters to the educational TV station serving New York City, and it assigned channel 16 for land mobile radio system use in the Boston area, resulting in an order moving it to channel 64.

== WSTG: Revival ==
Arcaro signaled to Rehoboth selectmen in 1977 that there was a possibility of the long-dormant station returning to air, as he had been approached by several prospective operators. In July 1978, Channel 16 of Rhode Island applied to the FCC to sell its construction permit for channel 64 to Channel 64 of New England, Inc. for $487,500; this application was approved by the FCC in February 1980. The purchasing parties in Channel 64 of New England were Pay TV Corporation, the holder of Zenith Radio Corporation's early subscription television patents, and Dallas-based Subscription Television of America. Shortly after the authorization, Sy Weintraub and Gordon McLendon bought an interest in Subscription Television of America, which was owned by Clint Murchison. Two months later, the company sold its subscription television franchises in four cities—Chicago, Dallas, San Francisco, and Providence—to Golden West Subscription Television. The Golden West deal never came to pass; the Pay Television Corporation received the rights to program the STV system on channel 64, as well as an option to buy 80 percent of the station, in November 1980 as part of a court settlement.

The construction permit took the call letters WSTG on September 22, 1980, and Pay Television Corporation announced at the start of 1981 that it would have the station up and running by the end of the year. Channel 64 went back on the air as early as November 1981 as a test, intending to broadcast as a part-time subscription TV station; it operated from the original WNET studio building. Instead, it operated on a limited basis while Subscription Television of America sought a buyer, a process complicated with the death of company vice president Paul Mowrey in August 1982. This limited basis consisted of rerunning 50 hours of cartoons and 14 old movies for two hours a day, six days a week—the minimum necessary to fulfill its commitment under FCC program test authority.

Providence Television bought WSTG in 1984 and relaunched it as a conventional independent station on September 16. It offered cartoons, classic reruns and movies, plus the Independent Network News. The company intended to work with UPI Media, a subsidiary related to the United Press International wire service, to provide programming support.

== WNAC-TV: Fox affiliation and growth ==
WSTG filed for bankruptcy reorganization in mid-1986. Sudbrink Broadcasting purchased the station in August 1986 from Providence Television after months of negotiations. Under new general manager Ric Gorman, the station repaired its transmitter to return to full-power broadcasting, affiliated with the brand-new Fox network, and changed its call sign to WNAC-TV. The call sign switch was an attempt by the station at raising its profile. The WNAC call letters had been used by the CBS affiliate in Boston, and it hoped viewers would recognize their use.

The newly renamed WNAC-TV needed the profile boost. Its ratings in its early history were generally disappointing, and it had to compete against independents from adjacent markets—most notably Boston, whose independent outlets had been viewed in southern New England for decades. To build a local identity, channel 64 picked up a package of University of Rhode Island Rams men's basketball games, the first regular television exposure for the team since 1982. It also introduced a weekly talk show hosted by Providence lawyer Raul Lovett and a local comedy program.

Price Communications purchased WNAC-TV from Sudbrink in 1988; the $11.5 million purchase price was nearly double the $5.85 million Sudbrink had paid two years prior. Sudbrink used the money to finance expansion of WTLK, its TV station in Rome, Georgia. It was the first independent station purchased by Price and represented one of its largest markets. The station added a local adaptation of Bozo the Clown, a children's show taped in the Rehoboth studio. Price sold its four stations to Northstar Television Group in 1989 for $70 million; Northstar was a joint venture of Osborn Television and Desai Capital, the largest stakeholder in Price.

Even as other local stations struggled with a decline in advertising and consequent layoffs, WNAC-TV withstood the recession due to its leaner operational structure (with just 36 full-time employees), financial backing by Northstar, and the growth of Fox. By 1991, WNAC-TV's Fox Kids Club had 55,000 members, making it the largest in New England and putting it in the top 20 nationally. Three of Northstar's four stations, including WNAC-TV, were acquired by Argyle Television Holdings II in 1994; the original Argyle Television had been sold earlier in the year. By that time, Fox was programming seven nights a week; as a result, the station ended its relationship with University of Rhode Island basketball because it could not justify the preemptions of network programming.

== Operation with WPRI-TV ==
On June 10, 1996, Clear Channel Communications—then in the process of buying WPRI-TV as well as two Providence-area radio stations—announced it would assume the operations of WNAC-TV under a local marketing agreement (LMA) with Argyle, enabling it to program and sell advertising time on channel 64. With the move, the Rehoboth facility was shut down, with some of the staff moving to WPRI's facility in East Providence to accommodate an expansion.

Logo used between 1996 and 2002

In 1997, Argyle merged with the broadcasting unit of the Hearst Corporation to form Hearst-Argyle Television. Hearst owned WCVB in Boston, and it could not keep both stations because of their overlapping signals; the FCC stated the overlap was 97.6 percent. For tax reasons, Hearst-Argyle preferred a swap. It reached a deal with Sunrise Television Corporation to swap WNAC-TV and WDTN in Dayton, Ohio—like WNAC-TV, a station whose divestiture was required due to signal overlap—for WPTZ in Plattsburgh, New York; WNNE in Hartford, Vermont; and KSBW in Salinas, California. Sunrise was one of two television companies owned by the private equity firm of Hicks, Muse, Tate & Furst, alongside LIN Broadcasting.

In 2001, Clear Channel sold WPRI-TV to Sunrise Television Corporation. Though Sunrise would become the new operator of channels 12 and 64, Sunrise could not hold both stations' licenses and opted to divest the WNAC-TV license to LIN for $2.5 million. The next year, Sunrise was acquired by LIN, leading to the divestiture of the WNAC-TV license to Super Towers Inc., a company controlled by Tim Sheehan, the son-in-law of LIN executive Paul Karpowicz.

WNAC-TV became the affiliate of MyNetworkTV in Providence when it launched in September 2006, airing its programming in late nights from 11 p.m. to 1 a.m. In 2009, it moved the service to a dedicated subchannel, known as MyRITV. WNAC-TV discontinued regular programming on its analog signal, over UHF channel 64, on February 17, 2009, the original date when full-power television stations in the United States were to transition from analog to digital broadcasts under federal mandate (which was later pushed back to June 12, 2009). The station moved its digital signal from UHF channel 54 to VHF channel 12.

In 2014, WPRI-TV owner LIN Media merged with Media General, which owned WJAR, in a $1.6 billion deal; one of the two stations had to be divested to complete the transaction, and WJAR was sold to Sinclair Broadcast Group. Media General then merged with Nexstar Broadcasting Group in 2017. In 2017, Nexstar acquired the CW affiliation in the market when previous affiliate WLWC (channel 28) sold its spectrum; the network moved to WNAC's 64.2 subchannel, with MyRITV becoming a subchannel of WPRI-TV.

On August 31, 2020, Nexstar exercised its option to purchase WNAC through its partner company, Mission Broadcasting, for more than $3.2 million; the transaction was completed on June 16, 2021. WNAC, LLC—the Super Towers subsidiary that had been the licensee prior to the Mission purchase—filed objections to the license renewals of 14 Nexstar stations including WPRI-TV in 2023, claiming that the company was late in uploading documents to its public inspection file.

== News operation ==
Alongside the LMA with Clear Channel came the ability for WPRI-TV to produce a local 10 p.m. newscast for WNAC-TV, which had previously entertained proposals from another station and New England Cable News. After Fox's broadcast of Super Bowl XXXI on January 26, 1997, the newscast debuted as Fox News Providence. The newscast briefly had competition when WJAR produced a newscast for the new WLWC, but that program ended after five months when Paramount Stations Group acquired WLWC. The 10 p.m. newscast was 30 minutes in duration until 2002, when it was expanded to a full hour. In 2003, WNAC debuted a 7 a.m. morning newscast, an extension of WPRI-TV's Eyewitness News This Morning.

Channel 64 debuted a morning lifestyle and entertainment magazine, The Rhode Show, in February 2009. It aired at 8 a.m. weekdays and featured three hosts: two WPRI morning anchors (Vince DeMentri and Elizabeth Hopkins) and a guest host drawn from a casting call that attracted nearly 150 applicants. A set with a functional kitchen was created out of what had been the lunchroom in the WPRI-TV studios. A morning newscast at 7 a.m. was also restored to the schedule; to make way for its expansion to two hours, The Rhode Show moved to WPRI-TV in January 2012. A third daily news program was added to the WNAC-TV lineup in 2014 when a 6:30 p.m. broadcast was introduced. By late 2023, these newscasts, plus weekend morning news and the public affairs program Newsmakers, combined to give the station 22 hours a week of news and public affairs.

== Subchannels ==
WNAC-TV's transmitter facility is located on Homestead Avenue in Rehoboth, Massachusetts. The station's signal is multiplexed:

Subchannels of WNAC-TV
Subchannel	Res.	Short name	Programming
64.1	720p	WNAC-HD	Fox
64.2	720p	CW-HD	The CW
64.3	480i	Rewind	Rewind TV
64.4	480i	Antenna	Antenna TV

== See also ==
- Channel 12 digital TV stations in the United States
- Channel 64 virtual TV stations in the United States
