= WNET (Rhode Island) =

Television station in Providence, Rhode Island (1954–1955)

- Providence, Rhode Island; United States
- Channels: Analog: 16 (UHF)

Programming
- Affiliations: ABC, CBS, DuMont

History
- First air date: April 5, 1954
- Last air date: July 10, 1955

Technical information
- ERP: 22 kW, authorized for up to 214 kW
- HAAT: 510 ft (155 m)
- Transmitter coordinates: 41°52′13″N 71°17′47″W

WNET (channel 16) was a television station in Providence, Rhode Island, United States, which broadcast from April 5, 1954, to July 10, 1955. It was owned by Channel 16 of Rhode Island, Inc., and aired programs from the CBS, ABC, and DuMont television networks. The station's facilities were located in Rehoboth, Massachusetts.

On the air, the station was generally economically unsuccessful, with losses averaging $11,000 a month (equivalent to $102,000 in 2024) because of technical and economic issues inherent in early UHF television broadcasting. Off the air, its history was dominated by a lengthy fight with rival broadcaster Cherry & Webb, which held a permit to bring Rhode Island a second very high frequency (VHF) station that could reach all homes and whose proposed station Channel 16 of Rhode Island believed would cause it economic injury. WNET lost the battle, and WPRO-TV began broadcasting over VHF channel 12 on March 27, 1955; channel 16 discontinued all of its local programs before folding in July.

On paper, WNET continued to exist long after it left the air. It lost a battle to move channel 3 from Hartford, Connecticut, to Westerly for its use, and it settled the dispute with Cherry & Webb in 1957. In 1969, the Federal Communications Commission deleted its construction permit for failure to return to the air. Channel 16 of Rhode Island successfully appealed the dismissal, but by that point, the WNET call sign had been assigned to the New York City–area public TV station. Additionally, the FCC moved the station to channel 64 because it had already reserved channel 16 for land mobile radio system use regionally. The permit was sold in 1980 to a group intending to use it for subscription television programming, which returned the station to air in December 1981—more than 26 years after WNET signed off—as WSTG, today's WNAC-TV.

== UHF comes to Providence ==
When the Federal Communications Commission (FCC) ended its multi-year freeze on new television station grants in April 1952, it made several changes to television station allocations. New channels were opened in the ultra high frequency (UHF) band, of which Providence was allotted two: channel 16 for commercial use and channel 22 for an educational broadcaster. On the very high frequency (VHF) band, Providence's pre-freeze station, WJAR-TV, was ordered to move from channel 11 to channel 10, and channel 12 was left open for a second VHF station. Prior to the freeze, Cherry & Webb—owner of Providence radio station WPRO—had applied for a television station. Two applicants made bids for channel 16. First to apply was the New England Television Company, a group of businessmen in various industries. This firm was soon opposed by Television Associates of Rhode Island, which counted more than 600 stockholders. Much like in the case of channel 12—which had a competing applicant—this made a hearing necessary to determine who should be granted the permit. That hearing was not likely to be held in the immediate future. In navigating the post-freeze wave of TV station applications, the FCC prioritized communities without existing stations. As a result, Providence was in 1,219th position out of 1,225 cities on the FCC priority list.

On February 28, 1953, Television Associates of Rhode Island and New England Television Company merged their applications, obviating the need for a hearing. The combined firm received the permit on April 8, 1953, and stated its intention to go on the air in November 1953. Little action occurred to build the station. Later that year, Channel 16 of Rhode Island lodged a protest to a similar merger of applicants that had permitted Cherry & Webb to receive the channel 12 permit. At the time, WPRO-TV was projected to sign on in mid-October. Channel 16 of Rhode Island believed that if WPRO-TV got on the air quickly, it would leave no programming or advertisers for its station. It also argued that the merger agreement for channel 12 violated FCC rules by combining ownership interests in other radio stations beyond WPRO and that Cherry & Webb had engaged in unauthorized construction of a TV facility prior to receiving the grant. The protest was successful. On October 16, the FCC ordered a halt to construction activities and prevented Cherry & Webb from putting WPRO-TV on the air so it could hold a hearing on the matter. In a move that underlined the economic stakes for channel 16, its principals pulled out of a separate plan to build a UHF station in Fall River, Massachusetts; William H. Keogh, radio and TV editor of The Providence Journal, pointed out that UHF stations were hamstrung by the inability of many sets to tune them without converters and low uptake of converters in markets with UHF stations.

The legal battle between Channel 16 of Rhode Island and Cherry & Webb continued after the hearing order. The latter sought information on the ownership interests of the former, and when the FCC granted more time for Channel 16 of Rhode Island to build WNET, Cherry & Webb responded by asking the FCC to block further construction activity on the UHF station. The commission refused to take up this plea. In a separate matter, Channel 16 of Rhode Island sued Cherry & Webb for defamation in connection with newspaper advertisements it ran: the case was initially dismissed by a judge as "legally insufficient".

== Channel 16 on the air ==
Meanwhile, Channel 16 of Rhode Island ordered equipment to build WNET in November 1953 and began construction the next month. Much of the work on the station's facility in Rehoboth, Massachusetts, was completed by mid-March. The station anticipated broadcasting to some 25,000 UHF-equipped homes in its coverage area, though in Rhode Island alone there were over 217,000 families with TV sets. A test pattern first went out on March 25, and test broadcasts began on April 5, featuring locally broadcast films as well as network film broadcasts; the station had agreements to air CBS, ABC, and DuMont Television Network programs not already seen in Providence. While these tests continued, Cherry & Webb petitioned the FCC for reconsideration of its bid to halt channel 16's operations. WNET formally began broadcasting on May 2, 1954, with the broadcast of a dedication and its first live studio and outside programs from its studio at Pine and Walker streets in Rehoboth.

Looming over the early months of WNET's broadcasting was the FCC's impending decision in the WPRO-TV case, which became highly anticipated. In an October 1954 article, John C. Quinn of The Journal called it "a championship bout in broadcasting circles" that had moved much slower than the expedited handling required of protest investigations. The commission issued its 5–1 decision on January 6, 1955, and gave Cherry & Webb approval to build WPRO-TV. The commission found that it would be in the public interest to authorize construction to proceed. Channel 12 would not be able to sign on immediately, as the planned tower had been knocked down by Hurricane Carol the year before. Channel 16 of Rhode Island immediately took the case to the Court of Appeals for the D.C. Circuit, claiming the FCC had not given it a "full and fair hearing". The company's legal counsel stated that the construction of WPRO-TV would "in all likelihood" force WNET off the air, while Cherry & Webb stated that the existence of WNET would diminish its ability to attract network affiliation and revenue to its station. Channel 16 of Rhode Island also used Cherry & Webb's need for a temporary tower to get WPRO-TV on the air as another venue to oppose its construction.

These efforts were to no avail. On March 2, the FCC approved another six-month extension for WPRO-TV to be built, though the possibility remained that the commission could force channel 12 off the air at a later date. Construction took place immediately, and WPRO-TV debuted on March 27 as a basic affiliate of CBS. Some CBS programs, such as Omnibus and Studio One, provisionally remained on WNET because they were subject to existing sponsor commitments, though they would move to channel 12 at the earliest opportunity.

The launch of WPRO-TV, as predicted, hurt the economic viability of WNET. In March 1955, it launched a bid to have channel 3 moved from Hartford, Connecticut, to Westerly for its own use. In the petition, Channel 16 of Rhode Island noted that the station had lost $11,000 a month (equivalent to $102,000 in 2024) since opening; this proposal met with vocal opposition from the two companies seeking channel 3 in Hartford. The next month, a federal tax lien was placed on the station by the Internal Revenue Service for unpaid withholding taxes.

Effective May 23, 1955, WNET discontinued all its live local programs in a cost-cutting maneuver described as lasting the slow summer months. Shows including The Tod Williams Show, Jerry O'Brien Sports Edition, barn dance Make Mine Country Style, Come On to My House, and the Theresa Landry Birthday Party were canceled as a result. The station abandoned weekday afternoon programming on June 4, signing on at 6 p.m. instead of 1:30 p.m. When viewers attempted to watch the scheduled boxing match between Floyd Patterson and Archie McBride on July 6, they instead saw a blank screen, and the station gave no reason for not being on the air. The next night, the station announced it would close down for good on the evening of July 10, unable to sustain further losses with what New England Television Company attorney Abraham Belilove termed "little or small future expectations of gain". Belilove did not rule out the station returning to the air on UHF if WPRO-TV were forced to suspend operations so as to maintain two TV stations serving Providence or on VHF if it were permitted to move to channel 3 at Westerly.

== After closure ==
Though Channel 16 of Rhode Island had left the door open to returning to the air if circumstances changed, this did not come to pass in the years immediately following its closure in July 1955. In November, the channel 3 proposal for Westerly was denied by the FCC. A glimmer of hope appeared in January 1956, when an appeals court reversed the order granting WPRO-TV's construction permit and remanded the matter to the FCC for further hearing. The station remained on the air, as the FCC made no move toward implementing the court order; on July 26, the commission allowed WPRO-TV to keep operating and denied a proposal by Channel 16 of Rhode Island that channel 12 be placed under a trustee and profits donated to charity. In December 1956, the FCC again found in favor of Cherry & Webb. Channel 16 of Rhode Island and Cherry & Webb settled the years-long dispute in March 1957; WNET's owner was paid $10,000 in exchange for withdrawing all pending litigation and agreeing not to further protest FCC actions in favor of WPRO-TV.

In 1965, Harold C. Arcaro became the majority owner of Channel 16 of Rhode Island; he acquired the Rehoboth facility as well as an adjoining 10 acres (4.0 ha) of land. That same year, Channel 16 of Rhode Island applied for a series in changes to WNET's facilities, which the FCC granted on January 25, 1968. Despite the approval, the station did not immediately start construction. As a result, in early August, the FCC notified Channel 16 of Rhode Island that the permit was possibly in jeopardy because of what it called the permittee's voluntary decision not to build the station due to "economic and other considerations". Channel 16 of Rhode Island alleged to the FCC that it should be allowed to wait until resolution in another hearing of a Providence cable company's proposal to import signals from Boston and Worcester, Massachusetts. The FCC—at the time in a push to cancel long-unused UHF construction permits nationwide—disagreed, and on April 4, 1969, it denied another extension of time and canceled the construction permit. In its ruling, the commission said that when companies decide not to build for business reasons, "they must vacate the channels so they are available for applications of others". The company appealed the FCC's decision to deny the permit extension to the Court of Appeals for the D.C. Circuit, which in 1971 ordered the commission to reconsider its action. In a unanimous decision, the court declared that the FCC had acted "arbitrarily, capriciously, and without rational basis" and noted that the commission had to resolve the larger cable TV issue. The court ruling also highlighted the efforts made by Channel 16 of Rhode Island to keep the station in potential operating condition over a 13-year period including paying taxes, maintenance and repair, and tower painting and lighting costs.

During the period in which the construction permit was deleted, the station lost its call sign and its channel. On October 1, 1970, New York City's educational TV station, previously known as WNDT, changed its call sign to WNET as part of the merger of the National Educational Television network with the station's licensee. Channel 16 was removed from use regionally with an order adopted on May 20, 1970, to reassign it to land mobile radio use. As a result, after the appeals court reinstated the construction permit a year later, the FCC issued a show cause order—to which Channel 16 of Rhode Island did not object—changing the station's channel from 16 to 64.

== A revival on channel 64 ==
Arcaro signaled to Rehoboth selectmen in 1977 that there was a possibility of the long-dormant station returning to air, as he had been approached by several prospective operators. In July 1978, Channel 16 of Rhode Island applied to the FCC to sell its construction permit for channel 64 to Channel 64 of New England, Inc. for $487,500. This application was approved by the FCC in February 1980. The purchasing parties in Channel 64 of New England were Pay TV Corporation, the holder of Zenith Radio Corporation's early subscription television patents, and Dallas-based Subscription Television of America. Shortly after the authorization, Sy Weintraub and Gordon McLendon bought an interest in Subscription Television of America, which was owned by Clint Murchison. Two months later, the company sold its subscription television franchises in four cities—Chicago, Dallas, San Francisco, and Providence—to Golden West Subscription Television. The Golden West deal never came to pass; the Pay Television Corporation received the rights to program the STV system on channel 64, as well as an option to buy 80 percent of the station, in November 1980 as part of a court settlement.

The construction permit took the call letters WSTG on September 22, 1980. Channel 64 went back on the air at the end of 1981 as a test, intending to broadcast as a part-time subscription TV station; it operated from the original WNET studio building. Instead, it operated on a limited basis while Subscription Television of America sought a buyer. Providence Television bought WSTG in 1984 and relaunched it as a conventional independent station. WSTG changed its call sign to the present WNAC-TV, previously used by a Boston station, in 1986.
