= WSTR-TV =

Television station in Cincinnati

ATSC 3.0 station

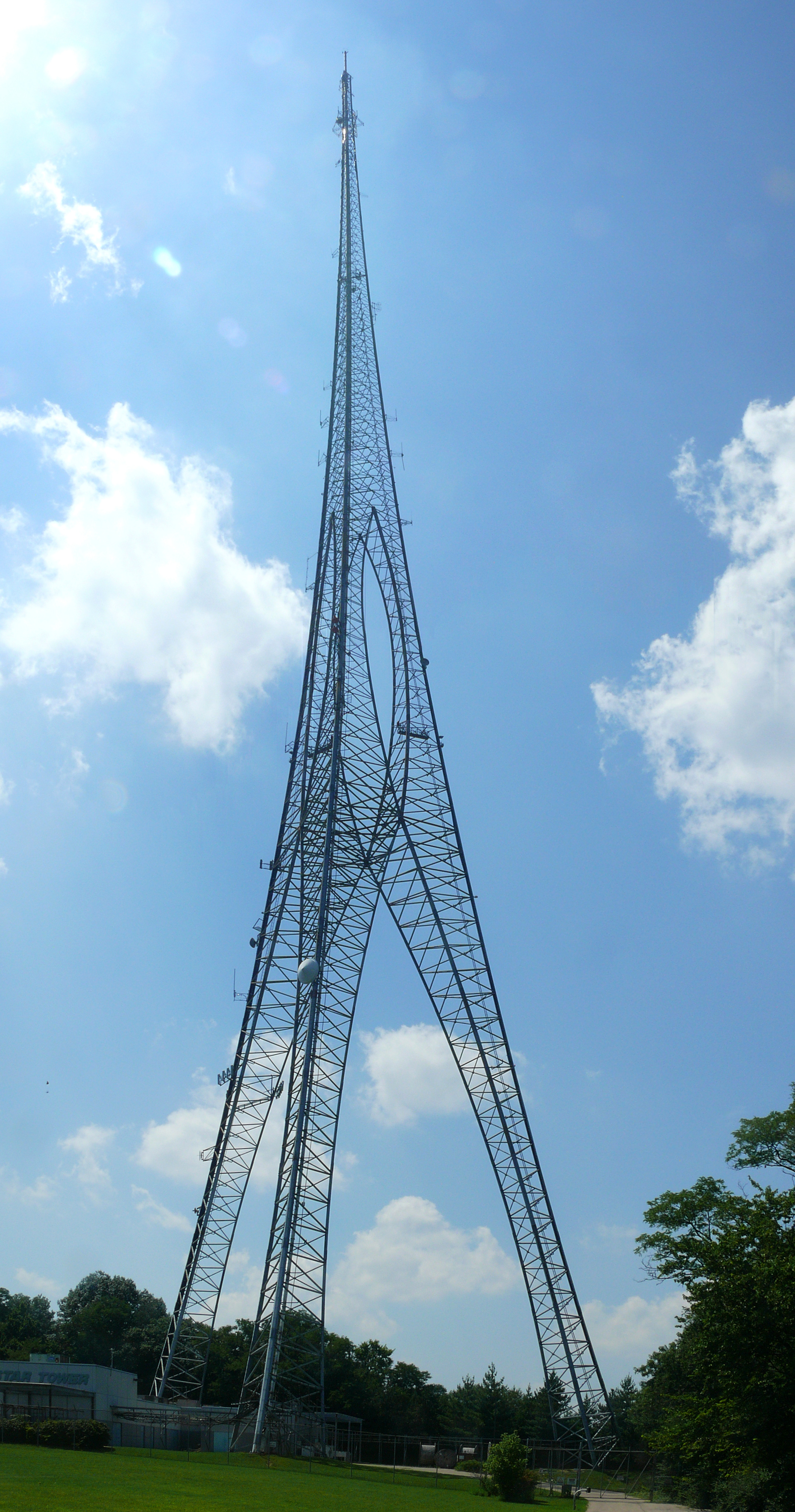
- The Star Tower has been used to transmit WSTR-TV since 1991
- Cincinnati, Ohio; United States
- Channels: Digital: 18 (UHF); Virtual: 64
- Branding: Star 64

Programming
- Affiliations: 64.1: Independent with MyNetworkTV; for others, see § Technical information and subchannels

Ownership
- Owner: Sinclair Broadcast Group; (WSTR Acquisition, LLC)
- Sister stations: WKRC-TV

History
- First air date: January 28, 1980
- Former call signs: WBTI (1980–1985); WIII (1985–1990)
- Former channel numbers: Analog: 64 (UHF, 1980–2009); Digital: 33 (UHF, 2002–2019)
- Former affiliations: Independent (1980–1995); UPN (1995–1998); The WB (1998–2006)
- Call sign meaning: Star

Technical information
- Licensing authority: FCC
- Facility ID: 11204
- ERP: 325 kW
- HAAT: 337 m (1,106 ft)
- Transmitter coordinates: 39°12′1″N 84°31′22″W

Links
- Public license information: Public file; LMS
- Website: star64.tv

WSTR-TV (channel 64), branded as Star 64, is a television station in Cincinnati, Ohio, United States. It is programmed primarily as an independent station, but maintains a secondary affiliation with MyNetworkTV. WSTR-TV is owned by Sinclair Broadcast Group alongside dual CBS/CW affiliate WKRC-TV (channel 12) and the two stations share studios on Highland Avenue in the Mount Auburn section of Cincinnati; WSTR's transmitter, Star Tower, is located in the city's College Hill neighborhood.

WSTR-TV began broadcasting in 1980 as WBTI, which broadcast a mix of commercial advertising-supported and subscription television (STV) programs. The STV programming was relegated into overnight hours (before being dropped altogether) at the start of 1985, making way for the station to become an independent station under the callsign WIII. After financial trouble, channel 64 stabilized under ABRY Communications before being purchased by Sinclair in 1996. It was briefly an affiliate of UPN before switching to The WB in 1998 and becoming part of MyNetworkTV in 2006. WKRC-TV produces dedicated morning and late evening newscasts for air on WSTR-TV. The station is one of Cincinnati's two ATSC 3.0 (NextGen TV) transmitters, serving the market's major commercial stations, which each broadcast some of WSTR-TV's subchannels on its behalf.

== History ==
=== Construction and subscription television years ===
On June 30, 1977, the Federal Communications Commission (FCC) granted a construction permit to Buford Television of Ohio, Inc., for a new channel 64 television station in Cincinnati, Ohio. WBTI signed on the air on January 28, 1980. It broadcast with one million watts of power and operated from studios on Fishwick Drive in the Bond Hill area; the station's original transmitter was located on Chickasaw Street.

WBTI was conceived and began broadcasting as a hybrid. During the day, it was an advertiser-supported, general-entertainment independent station from 10 a.m. to 7 p.m. each day, with a program schedule primarily consisting of classic reruns. In the late evening hours, the station's signal was scrambled as it carried programming from the ON TV service, which provided movies, sports, and live events to viewers through a paid subscription and a decoder to receive ON TV programs. (Buford, which had planned a multi-city expansion into subscription television and even a national network of translators through its Residential Entertainment subsidiary, licensed the ON TV name from Oak Communications in the Cincinnati market and also would build STV operations in Chicago and Minneapolis under the brand name Spectrum; it created the Home Entertainment Network division for this business.) Local sports programming included a small package of Cincinnati Reds home games, a major advance for a team that had not permitted the telecast of more than three home games in a season on television since 1966.

WBTI's ratings were less than stellar, while ON TV was being well received but already sensed that competition with cable was going to increase and present a difficulty in keeping subscribers. The subscription operation examined increasing to 20 hours a day—then the maximum amount of hours of non-free programming permitted by the FCC—as early as December 1981, and it carried out that expansion on April 1, 1982, relegating ad-supported WBTI programming to weekday mornings. In June 1983, the station cut back its commercial programs to the 90-minute edition of The 700 Club on weekdays, with ON TV the rest of the day and weekends except for three further hours of religious programs on Sunday mornings. It was able to do so because the FCC had abolished the so-called "28-hour rule"—which required stations to provide a minimum of, on average, four hours a day of non-subscription programming—in June 1982.

ON TV was beginning to face a tough road. After much delay, the Warner-Amex cable service QUBE became available within the Cincinnati city limits in early 1983, making ON TV less attractive to viewers. In October 1983, United Cable, which had acquired 80 percent of Buford's three STV operations, wrote down the entire unit and offered the systems for sale. All of this programming was also seen in Dayton, where Buford established translator W66AQ in 1981 to extend the marketing area of ON TV and WBTI's commercial fare. (Note: This translator, later renamed W22DE when it moved to channel 22 and integrated into Sinclair's Dayton operation, continued on paper until the license was surrendered in 2021.)

=== Emerging from STV ===
United sold 90 percent of WBTI in November 1984 to Channel 64 Joint Venture for $9.4 million, at which time ON TV had just 12,500 local subscribers (75 percent of which subscribed to adult programming), compared to 45,200 in June 1982. The station relaunched as WIII, "The Eyes of Cincinnati", on January 1, 1985; it restored a general-entertainment schedule, with ON TV programming being relegated to overnight hours only. At that time, general manager and Channel 64 Joint Venture part-owner Stephen Kent said the STV service "virtually runs itself" and could break even with just 2,600 customers. However, with a mere 3,200 subscribers remaining and Oak shutting down its satellite feed, ON TV in Cincinnati ended on June 1, 1985, at which time WIII converted into a full-time general-entertainment independent station.

Channel 64 soon ran into financial trouble. In April 1986, the station almost went off air after United Cable, which had retained a 10 percent stake after the 1984 sale to Channel 64 Joint Venture, sued the other partners, who refused to accept funding provided by the company to keep the station going. In a proceeding that saw the appointment of general manager Stephen A. Kent as receiver, it was revealed that the station owed more than $175,000 to program suppliers and had less than $5,000 in the bank. A Chapter 11 bankruptcy filing soon followed; the lengthy battle, marked by conflicts between United and the other partners, as well as cable penetration in the market, hurt the station, which had to exit several programming contracts. Talks with several potential buyers, including the Home Shopping Network, continued; Gerald J. Robinson, owner of the Cincinnati Gardens arena, made an offer, but it was ultimately United Cable that won out, immediately reselling the station to a consortium that included itself and two other investors.

Under United, the station left behind its status as what The Cincinnati Enquirer media columnist John Kiesewetter called "the IOUs of Cincinnati" and began to spend again on syndicated programming. However, the other investors opted not to buy the remainder of WIII from United Cable, resulting in the station—now with better ratings and reduced program costs—being put back on the market in August 1988.

United sold WIII to Cincinnati TV 64 Limited Partnership, under the ownership of Andrew Banks and Royce Yudkoff, in November 1989. Their initials served as the name for ABRY Communications. Soon after, stronger programming was added to include more recent sitcoms and better movies, and ABRY also invested in improved equipment. On September 15, 1990, coinciding with a total program lineup overhaul, the station changed its call sign to WSTR-TV and its on-air branding to "Star 64". In 1991, the station increased its transmitter power from one to five million watts at a brand new tower and transmitter site in Cincinnati's College Hill neighborhood. The Star Tower housed WSTR-TV and WOFX-FM.

=== Network affiliation ===
Star 64 logo from 1990 to 1998. A star design returned to WSTR's logo in 2009.

Under ABRY's ownership, the station acquired additional syndicated programs; WSTR then became a charter affiliate of the United Paramount Network (UPN) on January 16, 1995. In 1996, Sinclair Communications (now Sinclair Broadcast Group) acquired WSTR-TV (for $22 million) and KSMO-TV in Kansas City, Missouri, after already having purchased the remainder of the company's stations in 1993. In July 1997, Sinclair signed an affiliation deal with The WB, that resulted in a number of the company's UPN affiliates and independent stations switching to the network, among them WSTR, which began broadcasting WB programming in January 1998. The former WB outlet—low-power WBQC-LP (channel 25), with its limited signal and cable carriage—joined UPN nine months later.

In January 2006, The WB and UPN announced their effective merger into The CW. This was followed by the creation of MyNetworkTV by the Fox Television Stations group, which owned many UPN affiliates passed over for The CW. While Cincinnati only had one full-power affiliate between the two networks, Sinclair signed an affiliation agreement first with MyNetworkTV, which included WSTR-TV, two months before reaching any pact with The CW. (By that time, WKRC-TV had agreed to launch a subchannel to carry The CW.) WSTR carried MyNetworkTV's debut on September 5, 2006. In 2009, WSTR reintroduced its 1990s brand, dropping the "My" branding in favor of "Star 64", while keeping the network's logo color and style scheme.

Sinclair purchased WKRC-TV from Newport Television in 2012. To complete this acquisition, Sinclair assigned the WSTR-TV license to Deerfield Media, continuing to operate the station under a local marketing agreement that allows Sinclair to sell WSTR-TV's advertising time and provide technical, promotion, and support services for WSTR-TV's operation. The sale was completed on December 3, 2012.

On July 1, 2025, Sinclair announced that it would acquire WSTR outright, creating a legal duopoly with WKRC. The sale was completed on August 18.

== Programming ==
=== Newscasts ===
In December 2003, WSTR began producing a local 10 p.m. newscast with a staff of 19, using Sinclair's News Central hybrid format with a local anchor—Kim Moening, previously of WXIX-TV—reading stories in Cincinnati and national segments produced from Sinclair's headquarters in Hunt Valley, Maryland.

News Central was wound down nationally in early 2006, with the last newscast airing on February 24, 2006. It was replaced by a news share agreement with WKRC-TV, which began to produce a dedicated 10 p.m. newscast for the station in August 2006. After two years, WKRC-TV opted to reclaim the newscast for its CW subchannel.

Local news from WKRC-TV was restored in January 2014 after the two stations came under common operation, including a 10 p.m. newscast and a 7 a.m. hour of that station's Good Morning Cincinnati. An 8 a.m. hour of the morning show was added in 2015.

=== Sports programming ===
From 2016 to 2022, WSTR was the television home of FC Cincinnati, airing all matches not chosen for national TV. (Note: All Major League Soccer local television rights agreements ended after 2022 to make way for MLS's 10-year deal with Apple.)

== Technical information and subchannels ==
The station's ATSC 1.0 channels are carried on the multiplexed signals of other Cincinnati television stations:

Subchannels provided by WSTR-TV (ATSC 1.0)
Subchannel	Res.	Short name	Programming	ATSC 1.0 host
64.1	720p	MyTV	Main WSTR-TV programming	WLWT
64.2	480i	Antenna	Antenna TV	WKRC-TV
64.3	480i	Charge!	Charge!	WKRC-TV
64.4	480i	ROAR	Roar	WXIX-TV
64.5	480i	Comet	Comet	WCPO-TV

WSTR-TV ended regular programming on its analog signal, over UHF channel 64, on February 17, 2009, the originally intended digital television transition date.

=== ATSC 3.0 ===
Subchannels of WSTR-TV (ATSC 3.0)
Subchannel	Res.	Short name	Programming
5.1	1080p	WLWT	NBC (WLWT)
9.1	720p	WCPO	ABC (WCPO-TV)
12.1	1080p	WKRC	CBS (WKRC-TV)
12.10	1080p	T2	T2 (from Tennis Channel)
12.11	1080p	PBTV	Pickleballtv
19.1	720p	WXIX	Fox (WXIX-TV)
64.1	720p	WSTR	Main WSTR-TV programming

Subchannel broadcast with digital rights management
Subchannel streamed via the Internet

On September 14, 2021, WSTR-TV turned off its ATSC 1.0 signal and became Cincinnati's host station for ATSC 3.0 (NextGen TV), with reciprocal agreements with the four other commercial stations in the market to continue ATSC 1.0 broadcast of its subchannels while broadcasting the other stations in 3.0 format.

== See also ==
- Channel 18 digital TV stations in the United States
- Channel 64 virtual TV stations in the United States
