= West Mesquite High School =

Public high school in the United States

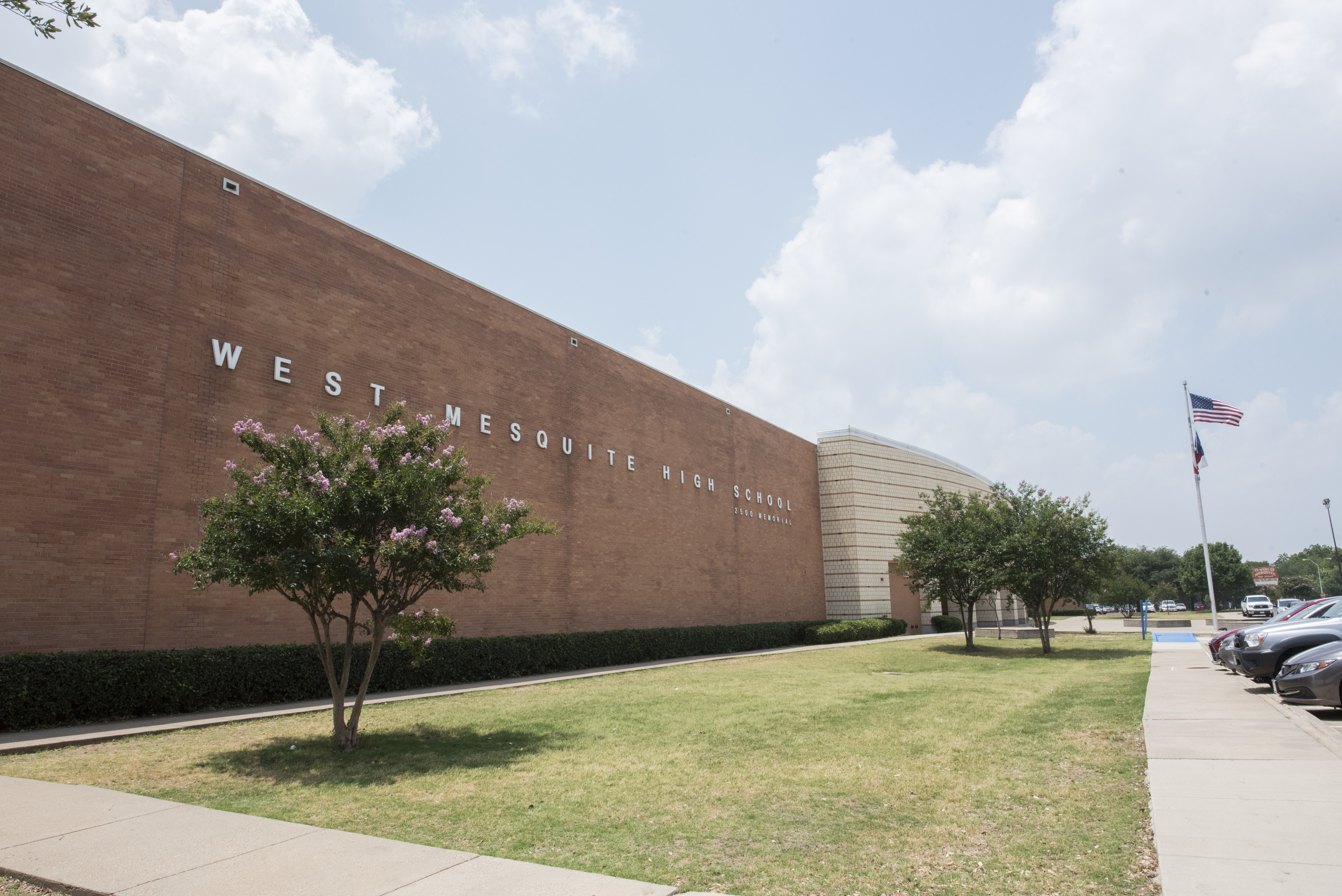
- Exterior of West Mesquite High School

Location
- 2500 Memorial Parkway, Mesquite, Texas; United States; 32.7618°N 96.6359°W

Information
- Type: Public High School
- Motto: Home of Honor and Pride.
- Established: Opened as a middle school in 1976, housing 7th, 8th, and 9th grades. The first graduating class received diplomas in 1984.
- School district: Mesquite Independent School District
- Principal: Bret Peterson
- Teaching staff: 146.95 (FTE)
- Grades: 9–12
- Enrollment: 2,082 (2023–2024)
- Student to teacher ratio: 14.17
- Colors: Burnt Orange and White
- Mascot: Wrangler
- Newspaper: WM NEWS (electronic)
- Website: westmesquitehighschool.mesquiteisd.org

West Mesquite High School is a high school in Mesquite, Texas, United States. The school, which serves grades 9 through 12, is a part of the Mesquite Independent School District.

The school serves the western portion of Mesquite and most of the MISD portion of Balch Springs. The school mascot is the Wrangler. The school is located near the Mesquite Championship Rodeo at the Mesquite Arena, and was built on land once owned by the Rodeo.

Memorial Stadium, is on campus along with the Mesquite Tower which broadcasts the school district's own radio station, KEOM.

== Athletics ==
West Mesquite High School currently participates as a UIL 5A (AAAAA) school in Football, Basketball, Tennis, Outdoor Track and Field, Cross Country, Golf, Soccer, Volleyball, Baseball, Softball, and Swimming.

=== Football ===
1992:The first winning season in WMHS history.

1994: WMHS finished 8-2 but missed the playoffs.

1995: WMHS wins its first district championship in high school football. The Wranglers finished the regular season a perfect 10–0, 5–0. Bi-District: Lost to Tyler Chapel Hill 35–15 in their first ever play off game.

1996: WM finished in a three-way tie for first place in district 12-4A with Greenville and Terrell. 10–2, 4–1. Bi-District: WM 40, WT White 0. Area: Grapevine 42, WM 13.

From 1994 to 1996, the WM Wranglers compiled a 28–5 record under Head Coach Gary Johnson.

2006: The Wranglers were 8–2, 6-1 and placed second in District 10-4A. WM ended the regular season ranked #7 in the area. Bi-District: Frisco 22, West Mesquite 19 (3 OTs)

2007: First year with Mike Overton as head coach. The Wranglers ended the regular season 7–3, 5–2. They finished second in the very tough district 10-4A. BiDistrict: West Mesquite 35, Lake Dallas 28. Area: West Mesquite 47, Whitehouse 29.Regional Semi-Finals: West Mesquite 41, Red Oak 28. State Quarter-Finals: Highland Park(49) beat West (6). The Wranglers ended their season with a record of 10–4.

2008: West ended the year with a 6–5, 5–1 record and qualified for postseason play. Bi District: Waxahachie beat West in the first round of the playoffs.

2010: West ended the regular season 8–2, 6-2 district, losing to Lancaster and Forney in district 15-4A. West ended the season with an average score of over 40 points per game, the lowest overall 21–42 loss against Lancaster, and the highest being 63–56 win against Waxahachie. BiDistrict: West Mesquite 48, Pflugerville Hendrickson 39. West advanced past the first round for the first time since 2007. Area: West Mesquite 55, Sherman 34. Regional Semi-Finals: West Mesquite 30, Wylie 38.

2024: West Mesquite went undefeated in the regular season, going into the playoffs 10-0. They passed the first round by beating McKinney North 28-14. They fell short during the second game and lost to Midlothian 45-21, ending their playoff season.

=== Baseball ===
1992: West Mesquite was UIL State Runner-Up to Robstown. Bi-District: West Mesquite over Dallas: Jefferson 1-0 Area: West Mesquite over Coppell 4–3. Regional: West Mesquite over Texarkana: Liberty-Eylau 5–4. State Quarterfinal: West Mesquite over Dallas: White 4–1. State Semi-Final: West Mesquite over West Orange-Stark 8–7. State Final: Robstown over West Mesquite 7-6

== Notable alumni ==
- Josh Butler, NFL cornerback for the Dallas Cowboys
- Craig Wayne Boyd, Winner of Season 7 of The Voice (U.S.) in 2014
- Trevone Boykin, former backup quarterback for the Seattle Seahawks, he played quarterback for the TCU Horned Frogs
- Alyssa Edwards, American drag performer, contestant on the fifth season of RuPaul's Drag Race
- Ty Jordan, College freshman of the year, played for the Utah Utes football
- Kyle Ward, professional football player and coach
