= Channel 64 virtual TV stations in the United States =

The following television stations operate on virtual channel 64 in the United States:

- K14AT-D in Ridgecrest, California
- K20LH-D in Ridgecrest, California
- KILM in Inglewood, California
- KNWS-LD in Brownsville, Texas
- KTFK-DT in Stockton, California
- KZTE-LD in Fulton, Arkansas
- WAXN-TV in Kannapolis, North Carolina
- WDPB in Seaford, Delaware
- WECN in Naranjito, Puerto Rico
- WLLA in Kalamazoo, Michigan
- WNAC-TV in Providence, Rhode Island
- WQPX-TV in Scranton, Pennsylvania
- WSTR-TV in Cincinnati, Ohio

The following stations, which are no longer licensed, formerly operated on virtual channel 64 in the United States:

- WBOA-CD in Kittanning, Pennsylvania
