= List of highways numbered 353 =

The following highways are numbered 353:

== Canada ==
- Manitoba Provincial Road 353
- Prince Edward Island Route 353

== India ==
- National Highway 353 (India)

== Japan ==
- Japan National Route 353

== United States ==
- Arkansas Highway 353
- Georgia State Route 353 (former)
- Kentucky Route 353
- Maryland Route 353
- Montana Secondary Highway 353
- New York:
  - New York State Route 353
  - County Route 353 (Albany County, New York)
- Ohio State Route 353
- Puerto Rico Highway 353
- South Carolina Highway 353
- Tennessee State Route 353
- Texas:
  - Texas State Highway 353 (former)
  - Texas State Highway Loop 353
- Virginia State Route 353
- Wyoming Highway 353

| Preceded by 352 | Lists of highways 353 | Succeeded by 354 |
