= Memorial Stadium (Mesquite, Texas) =

Stadium in Mesquite, Texas

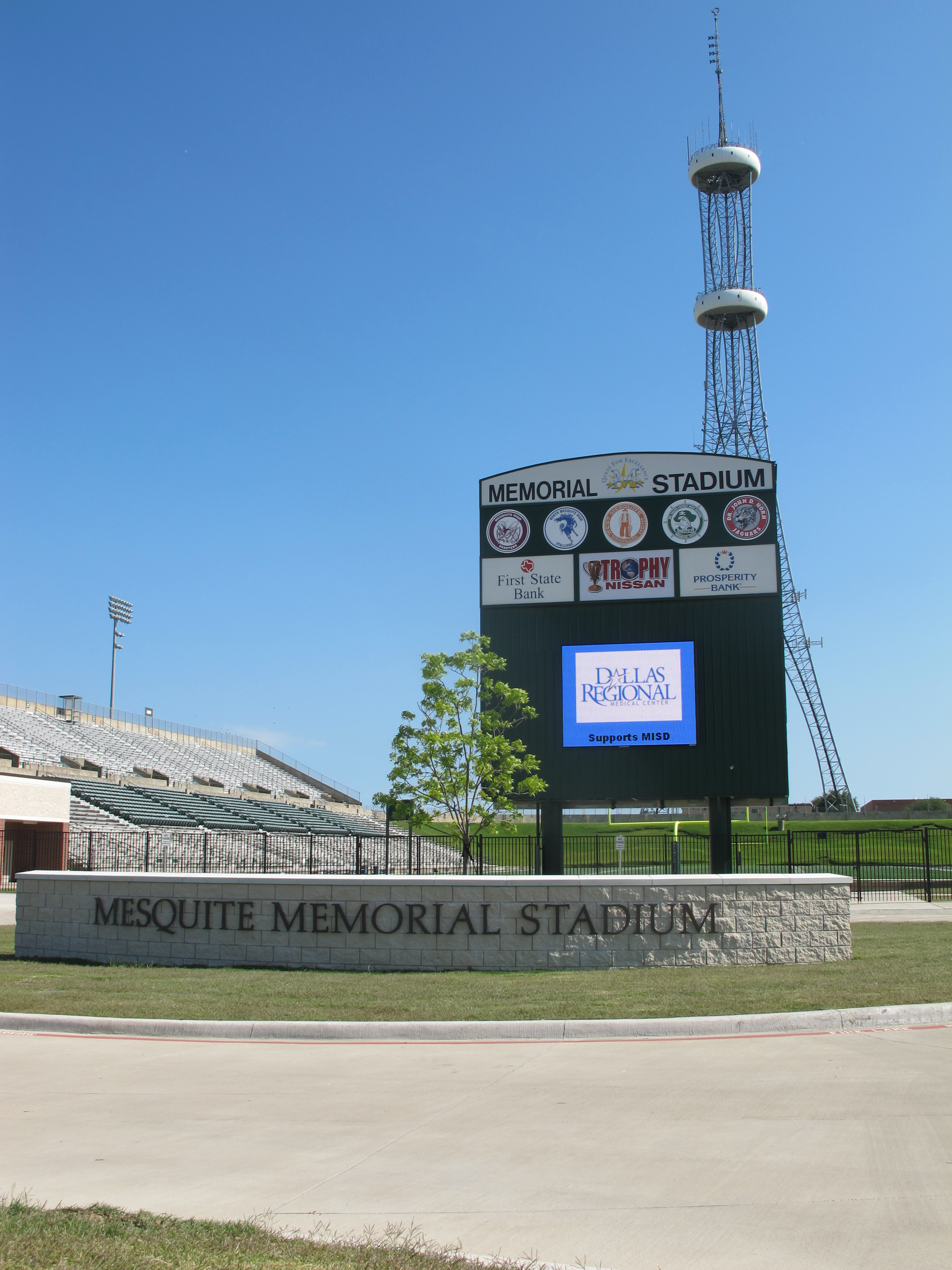
- Interactive map of Memorial Stadium
- Full name: Mesquite Memorial Stadium
- Location: 2411 W Scyene Road; Mesquite, Texas 75149
- Coordinates: 32°45′52″N 96°38′05″W
- Owner: Mesquite ISD
- Operator: Mesquite ISD
- Capacity: 19,400
- Surface: FieldTurf
- Scoreboard: 36’x42’ Daktronics, 36’x21’ video screen

Construction
- Opened: 1977
- Renovated: 2016

Tenant
- Mesquite ISD (UIL) (1977–present)

Memorial Stadium is a stadium in Mesquite, Texas. It was completed in 1976 and is located on the campus of West Mesquite High School, next to Mesquite Tower. The field is primarily used for football, and all five Mesquite ISD high school's share use of the field.

The stadium has a capacity of 19,400 people, making it the largest high school football stadium in Texas. It's the largest stadium in Mesquite, followed by EH Hanby Stadium, a 11,950-capacity football and soccer stadium. Due to its size and central location, the field is often used as a neutral-site for Texas High School Football playoff games. UIL Marching competitions are frequently hosted as well.

== Renovations ==
A massive $11 million renovation began in November 2014 and was completed by August 2015 in time for the upcoming high school football season. Among the new improvements was new façade, expanded concession and restroom areas, a new press box and locker rooms as well as an enlarged concourse area and elevators.
