= Landmark Tower Company =

- Company type: Private
- Industry: Telecommunications infrastructure
- Founder: Henry J. “Hank” McGinnis
- Headquarters: Fort Worth, Texas, United States
- Area served: United States

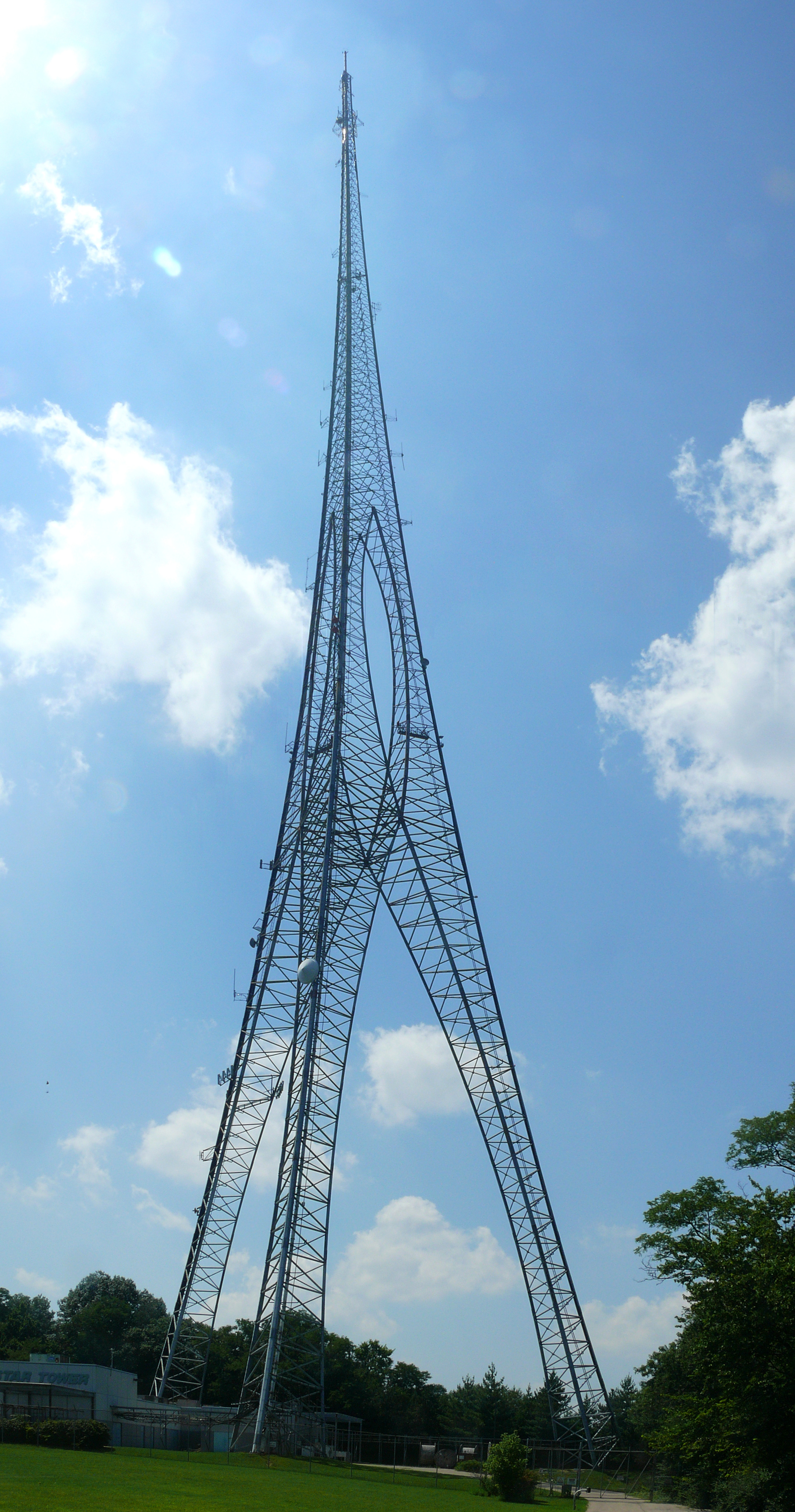
Star Tower, the tallest Landmark tower to be built

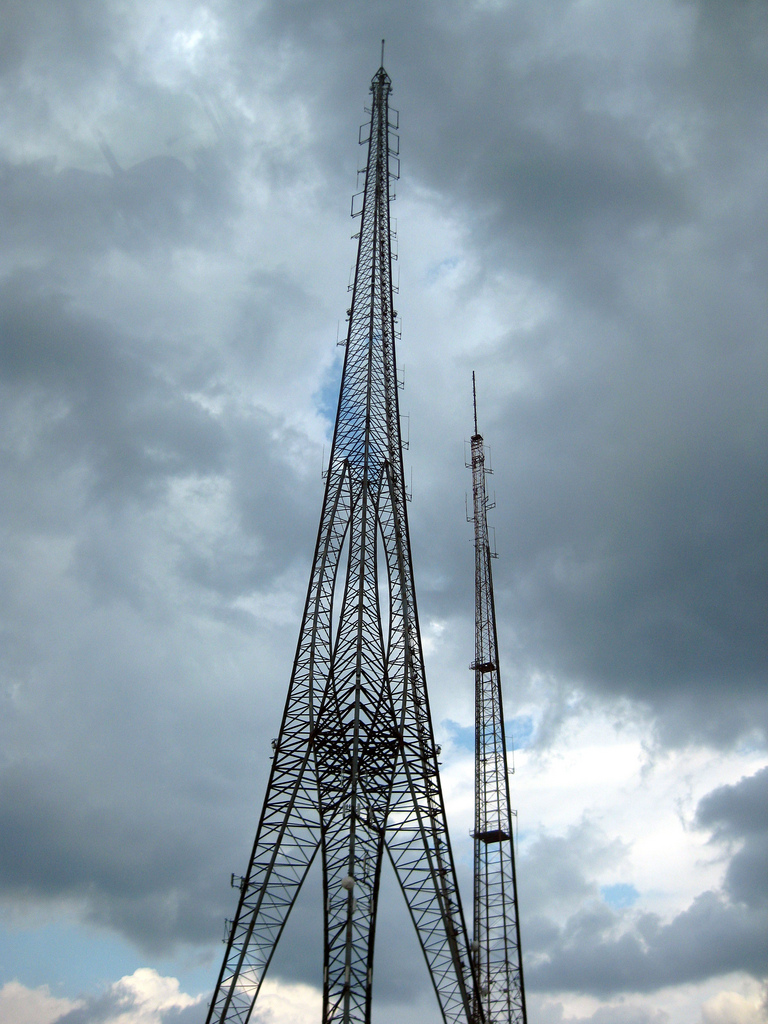
Hughes Memorial Tower, the tallest structure in Washington DC

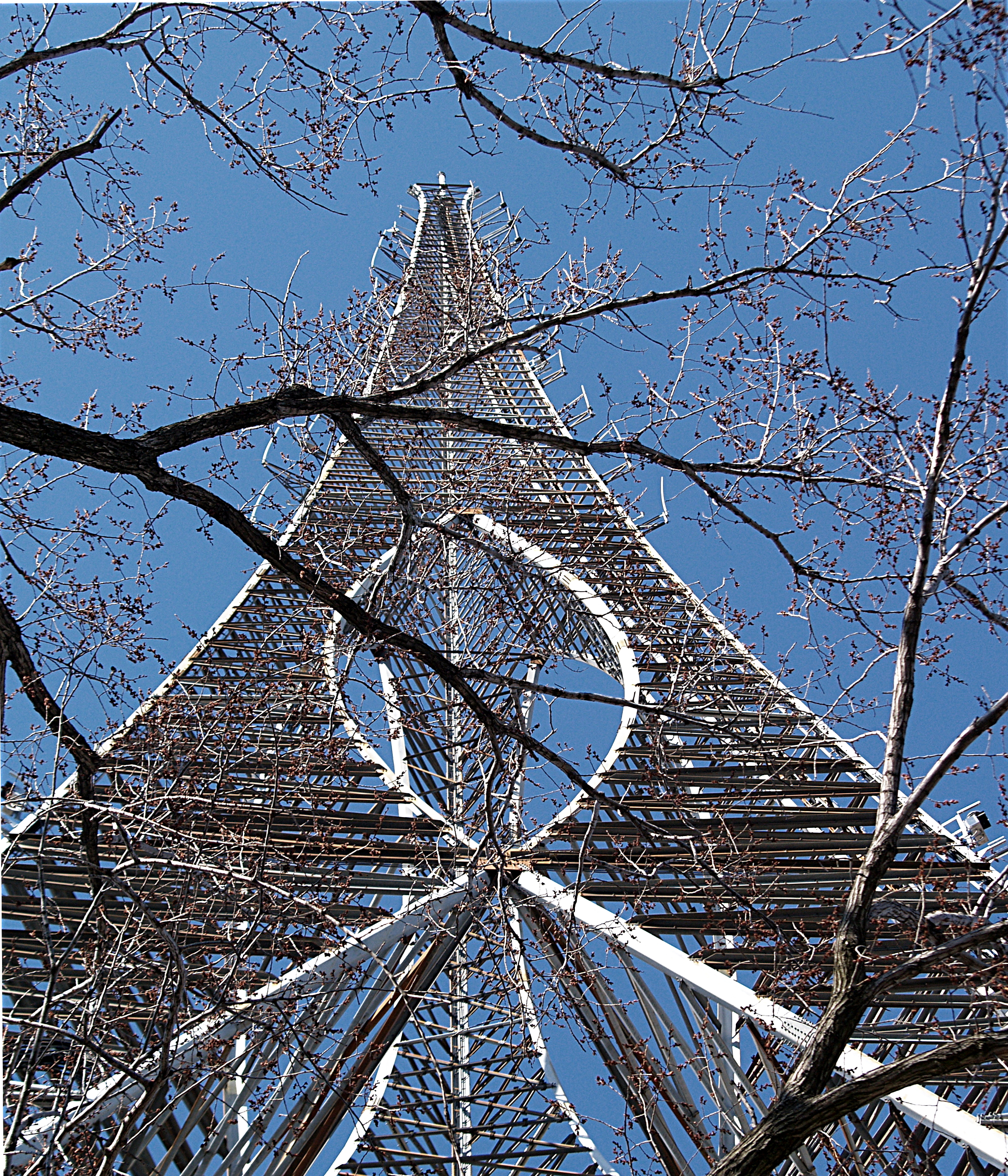
Another view of the Hughes Memorial Tower

Mesquite Tower, Another example of the Landmark Tower design as seen from underneath

The Landmark Tower Company was based out of Fort Worth, Texas and founded by Henry "Hank" McGinnis. The company was known for designing and building a type of radio tower known by the same name. McGinnis, who had previous experience building electric transmission line towers, evidently came up with the unique design while scribbling a Christian symbol of a fish on a napkin.

== Tower design ==
The prototypical Landmark tower, also known as an Adelphon tower, is a tripod in shape with three legs that rise to meet each other about a third of the way up. The legs taper down from larger footings to a thinner middle and then expand again to the point where they meet. The outer cords continue all the way up to the top of the tower in one swoop, but the inner three loop around into each other, creating a central ovoid and voided core. Aside from its unique appearance, the Landmark tower design has several advantages compared to the typical free standing lattice tower, with less wind resistance and a reduced amount of steel required for construction.

== List of towers ==
The most well known example is the Star Tower, located in Cincinnati, Ohio. The individual base leg columns were erected by crane, while the upper sections of the tower were built using a Sikorsky S-64 helicopter. Numerous other Landmark towers can found across the United States, including the Mesquite Tower in Mesquite, Texas, the Hughes Memorial Tower in Washington, D.C., and, at a smaller scale, WPXR-TV's analog antenna on Poor Mountain in Virginia, and another atop the Energy Plaza skyscraper in downtown Dallas, used by TXU Energy for its communications needs. None are known to have been built outside of the United States. The Adelphon Tower Company (Henry McGinnis) wrote bankruptcy on Prime Contractor Pyramid Tower & others in 1991 as Star 64 was completed. Many others were listed in the Chapter 7. The Landmark Tower Company went bankrupt as Henry's wife attempted to continue after Henry McGinnis passed on in 2002.

Tower	Year	Country	Town	Height m	Height ft	Remarks
Star Tower	1991	USA	Cincinnati, Ohio	291 m	954 ft	Tallest Landmark Tower ever built, assembled by helicopter
Hughes Memorial Tower	1989	USA	Washington, DC	232 m	761 ft	Tallest structure in Washington DC
WCCV TV Tower, also known as; Torre Yiye Avila	1991	USA	Utuado, Puerto Rico	167 m	548 ft	Formerly the tallest freestanding structure in Puerto Rico. Collapsed caused by Hurricane Maria September 2017
WLLY Tower	1995	USA	Mangonia Park, Florida	158.2 m	519 ft	
Mesquite Tower	1990	USA	Mesquite, Texas	155.3 m	509.5 ft	
Cumulus Media Tower	<2002	USA	Shreveport, Louisiana	152 m	499 ft	
Tower at 3551 J.R. Lynch Street (Extension)	<1996	USA	Jackson, Mississippi	152 m	499 ft	
Telecourier Communications Tower	1989	USA	Bloomington, Illinois	152 m	418 ft	
WPXR TV Tower	<1996	USA	Roanoke County, Virginia	74.5 m	244 ft	Poor Mountain Tower removed by 2017
Energy Plaza	?	USA	Dallas, Texas	33 m	108 ft	
Ministerio Cristo Viene Tower		USA	Utuado, Puerto Rico			shorter landmark tower of unknown height

== See also ==
- Lattice tower
- List of tallest freestanding steel structures
