= List of highways numbered 354 =

The following highways are numbered 354:

== Canada ==
- Manitoba Provincial Road 354
- Nova Scotia Route 354
- Prince Edward Island Route 354
- Quebec Route 354
- Saskatchewan Highway 354

== Hungary ==
- Main road 354 (Hungary)

== Japan ==
- Japan National Route 354

== United Kingdom ==
- A354 road, Salisbury to Isle of Portland

== United States ==
- Arkansas Highway 354
- Connecticut Route 354
- Georgia State Route 354
- Kentucky Route 354
- Maryland Route 354
- Montana Secondary Highway 354
- New York:
  - New York State Route 354
  - County Route 354 (Albany County, New York)
- Ohio State Route 354 (former)
- Puerto Rico Highway 354
- Tennessee State Route 354
- Texas State Highway 354
- Virginia State Route 354
- Wyoming Highway 354

Preceded by 353	Lists of highways 354	Succeeded by 355
