= Mesquite High School (Texas) =

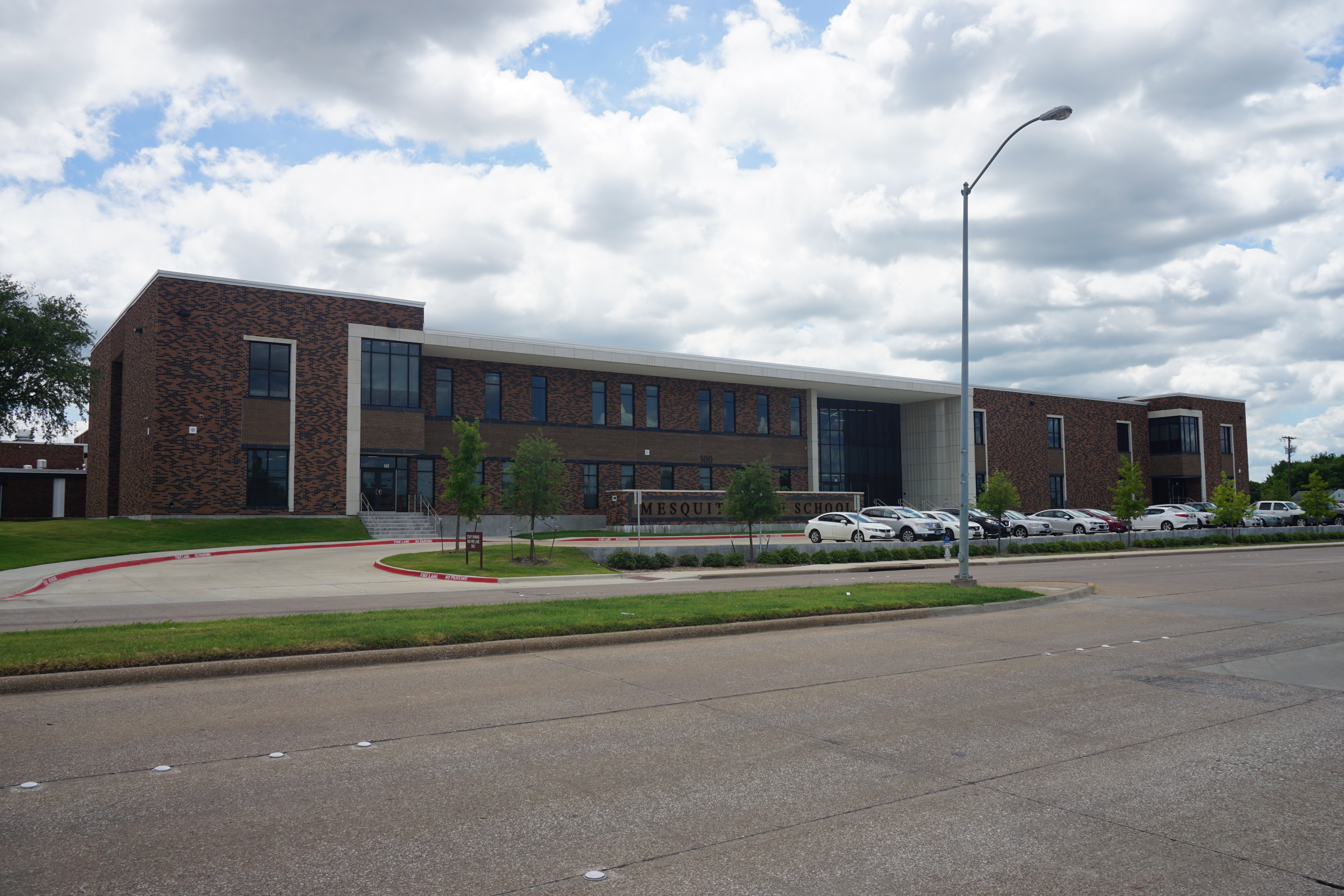

Location
- 300 E. Davis Street; Mesquite, Texas 75149; United States; 32°45′56″N 96°35′40″W

Information
- Other name: MHS
- Type: Public high school
- Motto: Where the tradition began.
- Established: 1902; 124 years ago
- School district: Mesquite Independent School District
- NCES School ID: 483039003411
- Principal: Jeff Johnson
- Teaching staff: 176.84 (FTE) (2022–2023)
- Grades: 9–12
- Enrollment: 2,405 (2023–2024)
- Student to teacher ratio: 13.60 (2022–2023)
- Campus type: Suburban
- Colors: Maroon; White
- Athletics conference: UIL 5A division
- Mascot: Stormy the Skeeter
- Nickname: Skeeters
- Website: mesquitehighschool.mesquiteisd.org

Mesquite High School (MHS) is a public high school in Mesquite, Texas, United States. It is part of the Mesquite Independent School District. It participates in the University Interscholastic League 5A division.

== History ==
In March 1901, the Mesquite Independent School District was incorporated at the behest of the citizens of Mesquite, Texas, to serve the city's primary and secondary educational needs. The first school was established at the current site of MHS in 1902 with an enrollment of approximately 200 students. A new high school was built on the property in June 1923. MHS was officially recognized as an accredited high school in June 1924 by the Texas State Department of Education, thus allowing its students to attend Texas colleges and universities without having to take remedial coursework. Additional expansions occurred during 1938 and 1939 as part of the Works Progress Administration created by President Roosevelt. A historical marker can be found at the street side of the L. building, and a WPA placard can be found on the outside of the art room to mark these significant events in MHS' history.

MHS students became known as "Skeeters" in 1944. This was a simplification of the traditional "Mesquiters," which had been the school's previous mascot name. 1954 marked a significant change at MHS when the district relocated all its other existing grade levels to other sites within the city, and the campus was solely dedicated to high school education. Integration of the school began in 1964 when area African-American students were allowed to enroll at MHS for the first time. In 1966, a six-phase renovation project plan began. The final phase of construction was completed in 1999.

== Academics ==
=== School performance ===
Historically, 1954 marked a significant change at MHS when the district relocated all its other existing grade levels to other sites within the city, and the campus was solely dedicated to high school education. This change, however, has not stopped the growth in services MHS offers to its students; Mesquite High School offers a broad array of basic "core classes" revolving around mathematics, English, science, and the social sciences as well as more specialized technical classes such as agriculture, web mastering, automotive technical training, and even cosmotology. The school also hosts its own library. (Note: Skeeter Library) and participates with a radio-broadcasting station. (Note: KEOM 88.5) Both of these, especially the latter, are designed to be partially student operated with instructors and teachers there operating as supervisors for the students. (Note: KEOM 88.5 "About")

For a benchmark of student progress and as an exit exam, Mesquite High School uses the State of Texas Assessments of Academic Readiness standardized test on most students entering and exiting MHS. The tests are administered every year for grades 9-11 and are given as remedial tests for graduating seniors who have not passed the previous year's tests. Ranked against the district and the state, MHS falls behind in terms of students successfully meeting the STAAR expectations for grades 9-11.

Mesquite High School, like most in the area, has been pushing the agenda on getting students active and interested in pursuing a future college education after high school with a number of measures. One of these, the Advanced Placement (AP) program, offers classes in a wide array of courses which can, if the criteria are met, be used to apply for college credit in the chosen course. These classes are supplemented in part by a program known as Dual Study whereby students can attend actual college courses on college campuses and earn credit towards that class. To students identified as able to learn on the same level as college students, the school also offers an accelerated program known as the Distinguished Achievement Program, or DAP, to give said students a leg-up on learning and success in the college academic atmosphere. The result of much of this has been that MHS enjoys a large number of graduating seniors who attempt either the ACT or SAT prior to applying to a college. This, however, is mixed with the fact that out of the roughly 71% who attempt either, only 16% arrive at the "At/Above Criterion".

=== Fine arts program ===
MHS has a fine arts program, which includes band, choir, orchestra, dance, and theater. The Mighty Maroon Band has placed in first division at UIL competitions repeatedly. The MHS choral program is considered one of the best in the state, placing first division in UIL competitions multiple times in the past several years. MHS choir also has a show choir program (Pizzazz), consisting of 12 select varsity singers.

== Operations ==
=== School dress code ===
As with other secondary schools in the Mesquite Independent School District, MHS adheres to the MISD Standard Dress Policy which defines inappropriate dress from that which is acceptable at all post-elementary MISD schools.

== Athletics ==
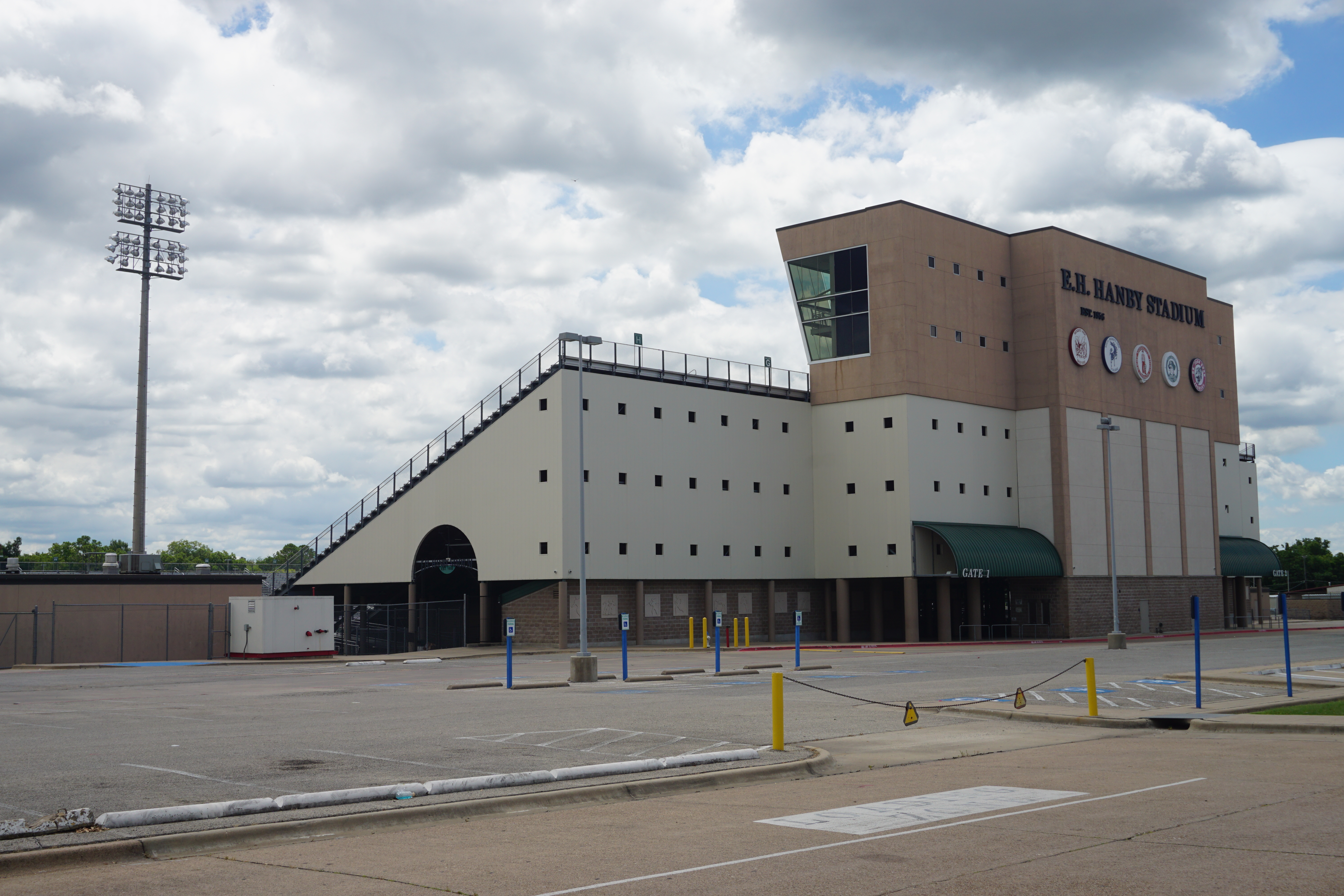
E. H. Hanby Stadium

Varsity team state champions:

- Football: 2001

== Feeding patterns and school demographics ==
Mesquite High School's relatively large size owes largely to the broad base from which it draws students. Directly, the school receives new freshmen from Agnew and Wilkinson Middle School with those schools, in turn, receiving students from the elementary schools Black, Gray, Hanby, Rutherford Tisinger, Moss, and Shaw.

The racial diversity of the school as of 2024 is 61% Hispanic, 27% African American, 9% White, and 3% other, including Asian and multiracial.

== Notable alumni ==
- Mike Ford (1977) – quarterback for the SMU Mustangs
- Ewell "Turkey" Gross – baseball player
- Rashard Higgins – a wide receiver for the Carolina Panthers
- Sean Lowe (1989) – a former pitcher in Major League Baseball who played from 1997 through 2003 for the St. Louis Cardinals, Chicago White Sox, Pittsburgh Pirates, Colorado Rockies and Kansas City Royals.
- Ronnie McAda – quarterback for the United States Military Academy and Green Bay Packers
- Ngozi Onwumere – sprinter and Olympic bobsledder, competing for Nigeria
- Eddie Phillips – quarterback for the Texas Longhorns
- Cory Remekun (2009) – an American professional basketball player
- Jordan Randall Smith (2001) – conductor
- Sonny Strait (1983) – voice actor, ADR director, and script writer at Funimation who provided voices for a number of English versions of Japanese anime series.
- Greg Vaughan – an American actor and former fashion model, known for his roles in the soap operas The Young and the Restless, General Hospital, and Days of Our Lives.
