= Wyoming Highway 350 =

State highway in Wyoming, United States

Wyoming Highway 350
- Middle Piney Road
- WYO 350 highlighted in red

Route information
- Maintained by WYDOT
- Length: 5.06 mi (8.14 km)

Major junctions
- West end: CR 111 west of Big Piney
- East end: US 189 in Big Piney

Location
- Country: United States
- State: Wyoming
- Counties: Sublette

Highway system
- Wyoming State Highway System; Interstate; US; State
← WYO 346	→ WYO 351

Wyoming Highway 350 (WYO 350) is a 5.06-mile-long (8.14 km) east-west Wyoming state road located in southeastern Sublette County. It acts as a spur from U.S. Route 189 (US 189) in Big Piney west toward the Bridger-Teton National Forest.

== Route description ==
Wyoming Highway 350 begins its western end near the Bridger-Teton National Forest at CR 111 five miles west of Big Piney. Highway 350 picks up the name Middle Piney Road and travels east reaching Big Piney at a little over 3.5 miles. WYO 350 enters on Piney Drive before turning south onto N. Nichols Street. And then once again turns east onto Budd Avenue before reaching its eastern terminus at U.S. Route 189 (Front Street).

== Major intersections ==
The entire route is in Sublette County.

Location	mi	km	Destinations	Notes
	0.00	0.00	CR 111 (Middle Piney Road)	Continuation beyond western terminus
Big Piney	5.06	8.14	US 189	
1.000 mi = 1.609 km; 1.000 km = 0.621 mi
