= Mesquite Independent School District =

School district in Texas

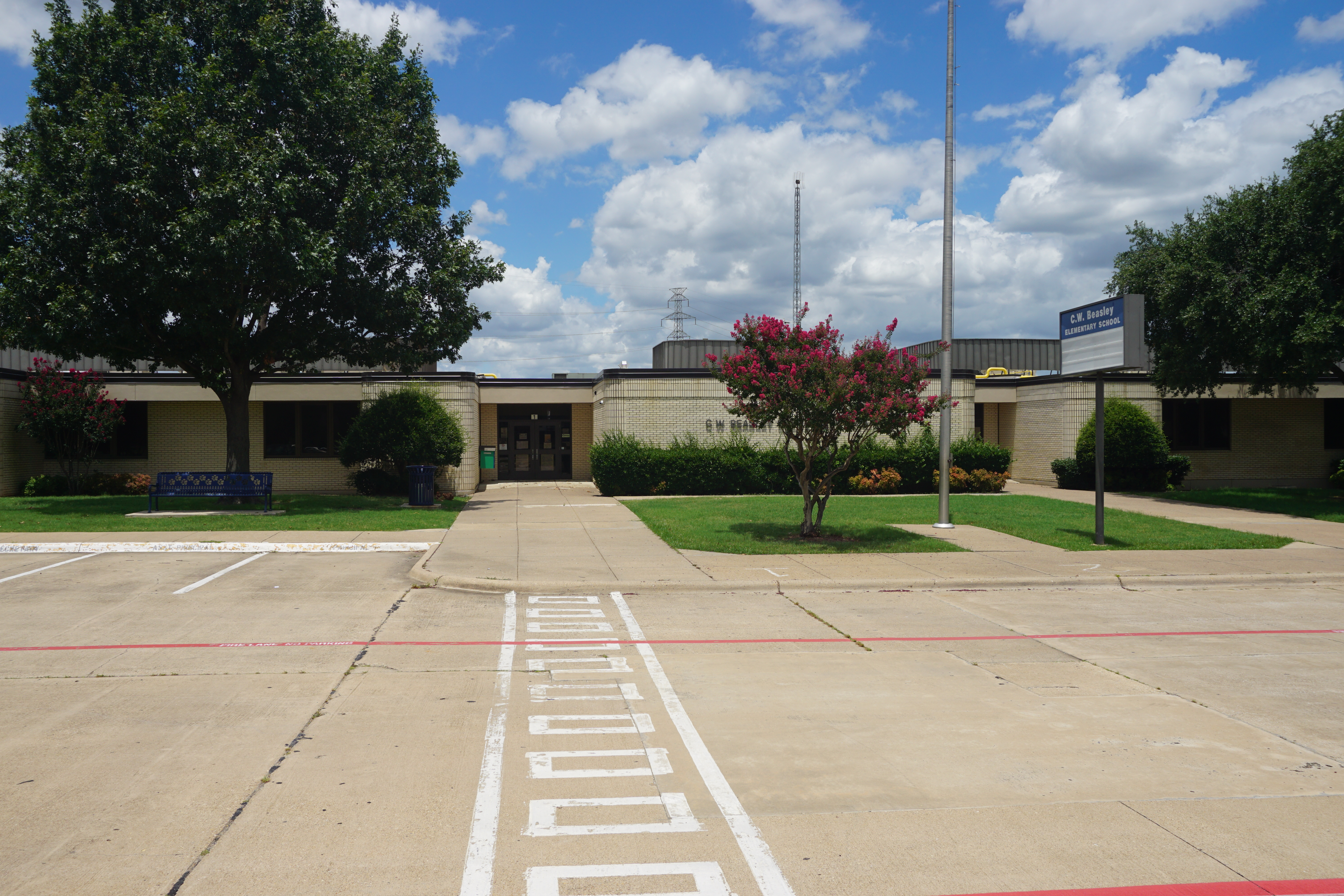
- C. W. Beasley Elementary School

Location
- 3819 Towne Crossing Boulevard, Mesquite, TX, 75150 United States of America

District information
- Type: Public
- Motto: “Quest For Excellence"
- Grades: PK - 12
- Established: 1901; 125 years ago
- Superintendent: Dr. Ángel Rivera
- Asst. superintendent(s): Dr. Janine Fields, Dr. Jennifer Hammett, Dr. Leslie Feinglas, Dr. Andrea Hensley, Taylor Morris, Gilbert Prado, Laura Jobe.
- Schools: 52

Students and staff
- Students: 38,378 (2020-21)
- Teachers: 2,646 (2020-21)
- Student–teacher ratio: 14.5 (2020-21)

Other information
- Website: www.mesquiteisd.org

The Mesquite Independent School District (MISD) is a school district in Mesquite, Texas, United States, (incorporating most of Mesquite and portions of Balch Springs, Dallas, Garland, and Seagoville, as well as formerly serving all high school students of Sunnyvale), which follows the standard definition of an independent school district.

The district contains over 38,000 students. Of the five main high schools, one is classified as 6A in UIL, and the other four are class 5A. As of March 8, 2022, the superintendent is Dr. Ángel Rivera.

All houses and residential areas in MISD are each assigned to an elementary school (prekindergarten or kindergarten to grade 5), a middle school (grades 6-8), and a high school (grades 9-12).

In addition, the MISD operates two high school football facilities for its high schools, Memorial Stadium near West Mesquite High School (which is the largest high-school football stadium in Texas, seating nearly 20,000) and E. H. Hanby Stadium, which is located adjacent to Mesquite High School.

In 2009, the school district was rated "recognized" by the Texas Education Agency.

== Demographics ==
In 1997, 70.6% of the students were non-Hispanic white; of the four large suburban majority-white suburban school districts in the county, MISD had the highest percentage of white students. From that year to 2016 the number had declined by 68%, making it the most severe decline of the four districts.

From 1997 to 2016, the number of students on free or reduced lunches, a way of classifying a student as low income, increased by 266%.

== Boundary ==
The district, in Dallas County, includes most of Mesquite and portions of Balch Springs, Dallas, Garland, and Seagoville.

Before 2009, Sunnyvale Independent School District sent high-school students to North Mesquite High School in MISD.

== Standardized dress and dress codes ==
The district has implemented standardized dress (similar to a school uniform) for middle and high-school students, which started with the 2005 to 2006 school year. The districtwide dress code also dictates hair length and acceptable hair styles of male students. It was one of the first Dallas-area school districts to implement a formal dress code, and Karel Holloway of The Dallas Morning News wrote in 2009, "The district is well-known for its conservative standards for dress". In the 1970s, the district sent a boy home from school because his hair touched his collar. This caused national attention.

== Radio station KEOM 88.5 ==
MISD operates an FM radio station called KEOM 88.5. This is the largest student radio station in the nation.

== List of schools ==
=== Secondary schools ===
High schools (grades 9-12)
School name	Established	UIL	Additional information
Dr. John D. Horn High School	2000	A6	
Poteet High School	1986	A5	
West Mesquite High School	1984	A5	
Mesquite High School	1902	A5	
North Mesquite High School	1969	A5	
Vanguard High School	2021	A5	

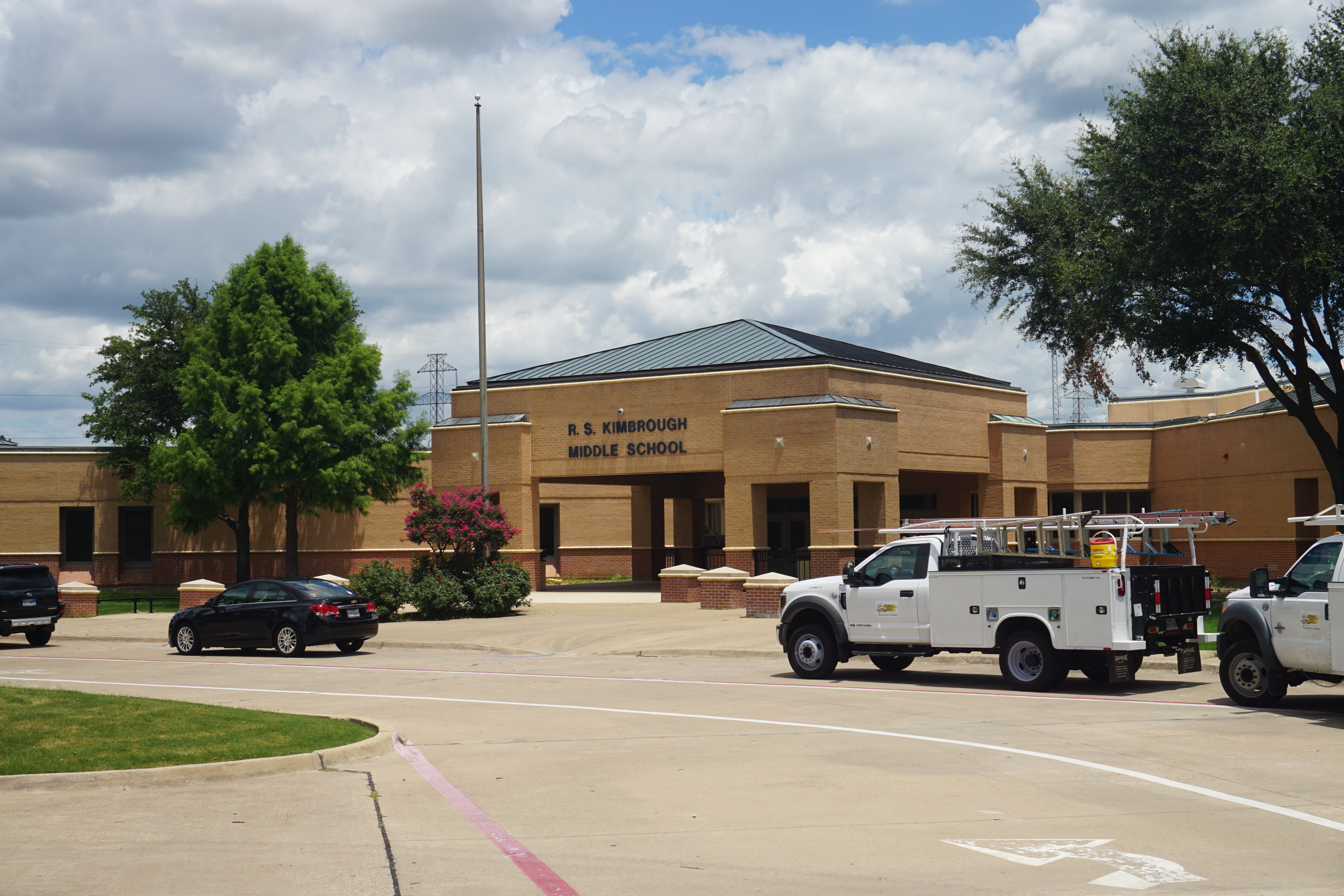
R. S. Kimbrough Middle School

Middle schools (grades 6-8)
School name	Location	Year opened	Additional information
Agnew Middle School	Mesquite		
Kimbrough Middle School	Mesquite	Fall 1993	
Terry Middle School	Mesquite	2006	
Woolley Middle School	Mesquite	2020	
Berry Middle School	Mesquite	1997	
McDonald Middle School	Mesquite	1972	
Vanston Middle School	Mesquite	1959	
Lanny Frasier Middle School	Mesquite	2018	
A.C. New Middle School	Balch Springs		
Wilkinson Middle School	Mesquite		

Elementary schools (prekindergarten to grade 5)
School name	Location	Grade level	Year opened	Additional information
Achziger Elementary School	Mesquite		2008	
Black Elementary School	Mesquite			
J.H Florence Elementary School	Mesquite			
Gentry Elementary School	Mesquite		2003	
Henrie Elementary School	Dallas		August 2015	
Lawrence Elementary School	Mesquite		1967	
Ferd Arthur McWhorter Elementary School	Mesquite			
Pirrung Elementary School	Mesquite		1987	
I.N Range Elementary School	Mesquite		1962	
Seabourn Elementary School	Mesquite		1966	
B.J. Smith Elementary School	Mesquite		1998	
Tosch Elementary	Mesquite		1966	
J.C. Austin Elementary	Mesquite		1989	
J.C. Cannaday Elementary School	Mesquite		1986	
Walter E. Floyd Elementary School	Balch Springs		1977	
W.O. Gray Elementary School	Balch Springs		August 11, 1999	
Ed Hodges Elementary School	Balch Springs		1964	
Mackey Elementary School	Mesquite		2003	
Moss Elementary School	Mesquite		Fall 1992	
G.R Moss Elementary School	Mesquite		1982	National Blue Ribbon School
J.C. Rugel Elementary School	Mesquite		1965	
Shands Elementary School	Mesquite			
Jay R. Thompson Elementary School	Mesquite		1966	
Beasley Elementary School	Mesquite		1981	
Ben and Jo Ann Cross Elementary School	Mesquite		August 2023	
Bedford Galloway Elementary	Mesquite		1963	
John L. Hanby Elementary School	Mesquite		2001	
Hanby Elementary School	Mesquite		1985	
E.S. McKenzie Elementary School	Mesquite		1979	
Motley Elementary School	Mesquite		1962	
Price Elementary School	Garland			
Motley Elementary School	Mesquite		1962	
Sam Rutherford Elementary School	Mesquite		1965	
Ruby Shaw Elementary School	Mesquite		1982	
Ben F. Tisinger Elementary	Mesquite			

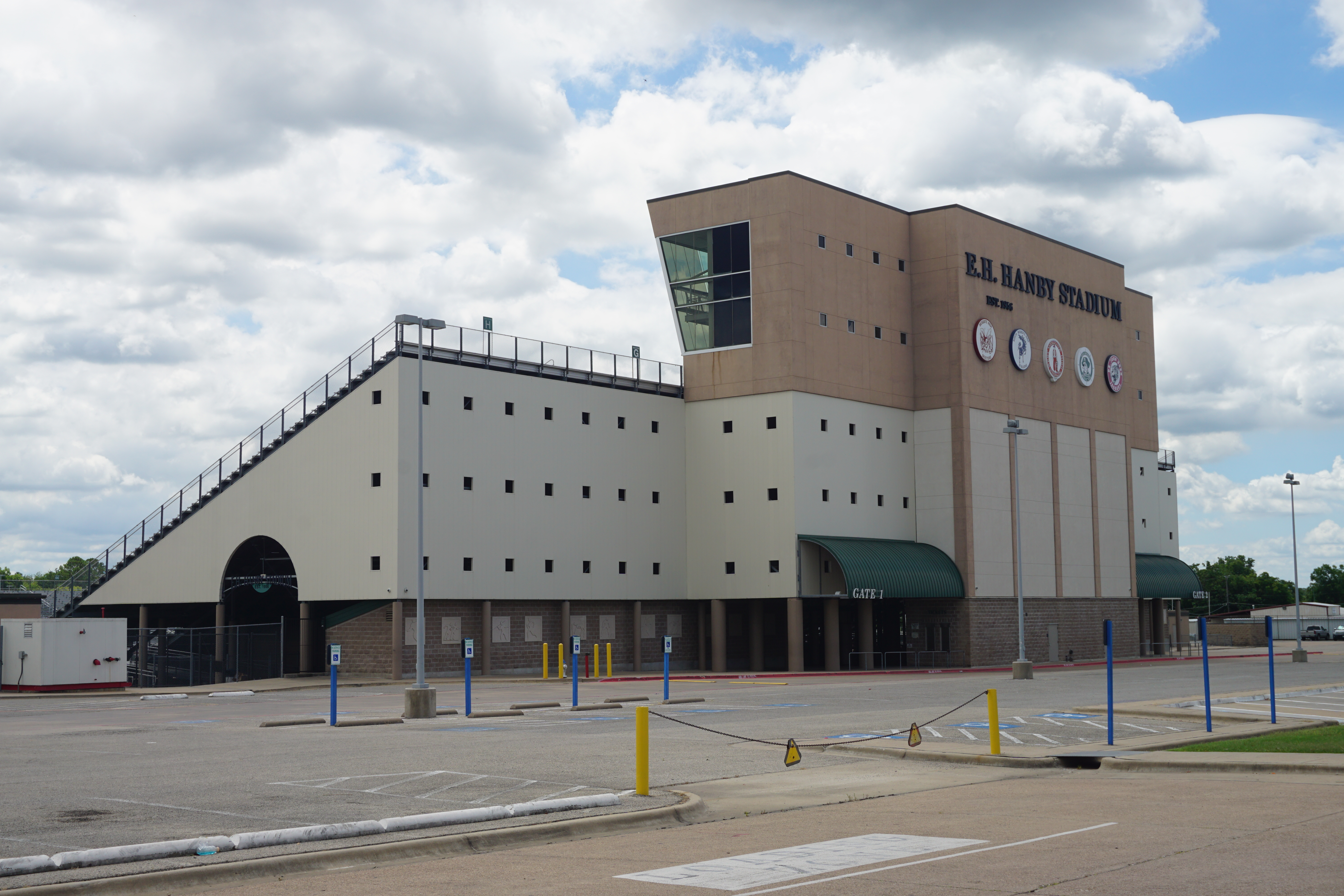
E.H. Hanby Stadium

Other
Name	Year opened	Additional information
The Learning Center		Disciplinary alternative education program
Mesquite Academy	1993	Middle schools and high schools
KEOM 88.5 FM	September 4, 1984	Broadcast radio
Education Foundation	2004	Non-Profit
Family and Community Engagement		
Mesquite Hall of Honor	2018	
Read Play Talk		Child's development

== See also ==
- List of school districts in Texas
