= Star Tower =

Radio and TV transmission tower in Cincinnati

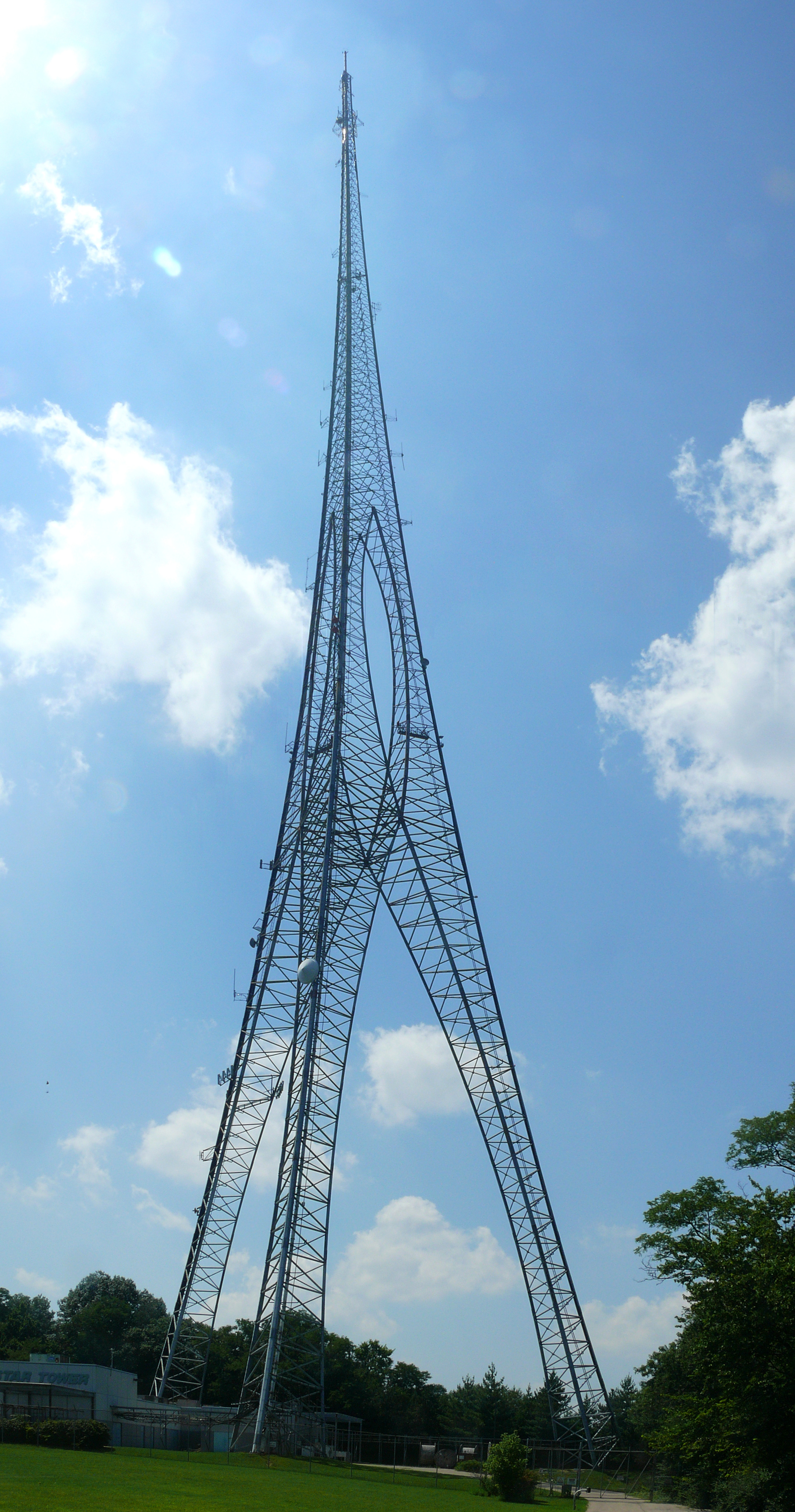

- Location within the United States

General information
- Status: Completed
- Type: Steel lattice television tower
- Location: Cincinnati, Ohio
- Coordinates: 39°12′01″N 84°31′22″W
- Completed: 1991

Height
- Height: 290.8 m (954 ft)

Star Tower is a digital television and FM radio transmitting tower on Winton Road near North Bend Road in the College Hill neighborhood of Cincinnati, Ohio designed and built by the Landmark Tower Company. The three-legged lattice tower stands 954 feet (290.8 m) high. It is one of the tallest lattice towers in the world and the second tallest of the four that rise above 900 feet in Cincinnati, Ohio. The tower is owned by the Sinclair Broadcast Group, though the company owns an additional tower in Mount Auburn for its main station in the area, CBS affiliate WKRC-TV (next to WSTR and WKRC's studios).

== History ==
In 1988, Hoker Broadcasting Company, then owner of WOFX-FM and WSTR-TV ("Star 64"), purchased a site in College Hill from a developer who had planned to build self-storage lockers. It was registered with FCC as Antenna Structure Registration (ASR) 1014132. The following year, nearby residents sued to stop the project out of concern that the tower would be an eyesore. Hoker settled with the group in 1991, agreeing to restrictions on how the land surrounding the tower could be developed. Landmark Tower Company completed the tower in October 1991. At the time, it was the tallest tower in Cincinnati and the tallest of its kind in the world. It increased WSTR's transmitting power by 5,000 square miles (13,000 km^{2}) and added 1 million potential viewers.

== Stations ==
An omnidirectional antenna atop Star Tower continues to transmit WSTR-TV, while a number of FM radio stations, including WREW, WGRR, and WYGY also broadcast from the tower. WRRM has a backup antenna located on this tower; their primary is on the WXIX tower closer to the center of Cincinnati.

=== Television ===
TV stations that transmit from Star Tower include the following:

Callsign	Virtual Channel	Physical Channel	Affiliation
WSTR-TV	64	18	MyNetworkTV

=== Radio ===
FM stations that transmit from Star Tower Tower include the following:

Callsign	Frequency	Format	Owner
WREW	94.9	Adult Contemporary	Hubbard Broadcasting
WYGY	97.3	Country	Hubbard Broadcasting
WRRM	98.5	Adult Contemporary	Cumulus Media
WGRR	103.5	Classic Hits	Cumulus Media

== See also ==
- Lattice tower
- List of tallest freestanding steel structures
- List of famous transmission sites
