= 2018 Arkansas Razorbacks football team =

American college football season

2018 Arkansas Razorbacks football
- Conference: Southeastern Conference
- Western Division
- Record: 2–10 (0–8 SEC)
- Head coach: Chad Morris (1st season)
- Offensive coordinator: Joe Craddock (1st season)
- Offensive scheme: Power spread
- Defensive coordinator: John Chavis (1st season)
- Base defense: 4–3
- Captains: Hjalte Froholdt; Dre Greenlaw; De'Jon Harris; Santos Ramirez
- Home stadium: Donald W. Reynolds Razorback Stadium; War Memorial Stadium

Uniform
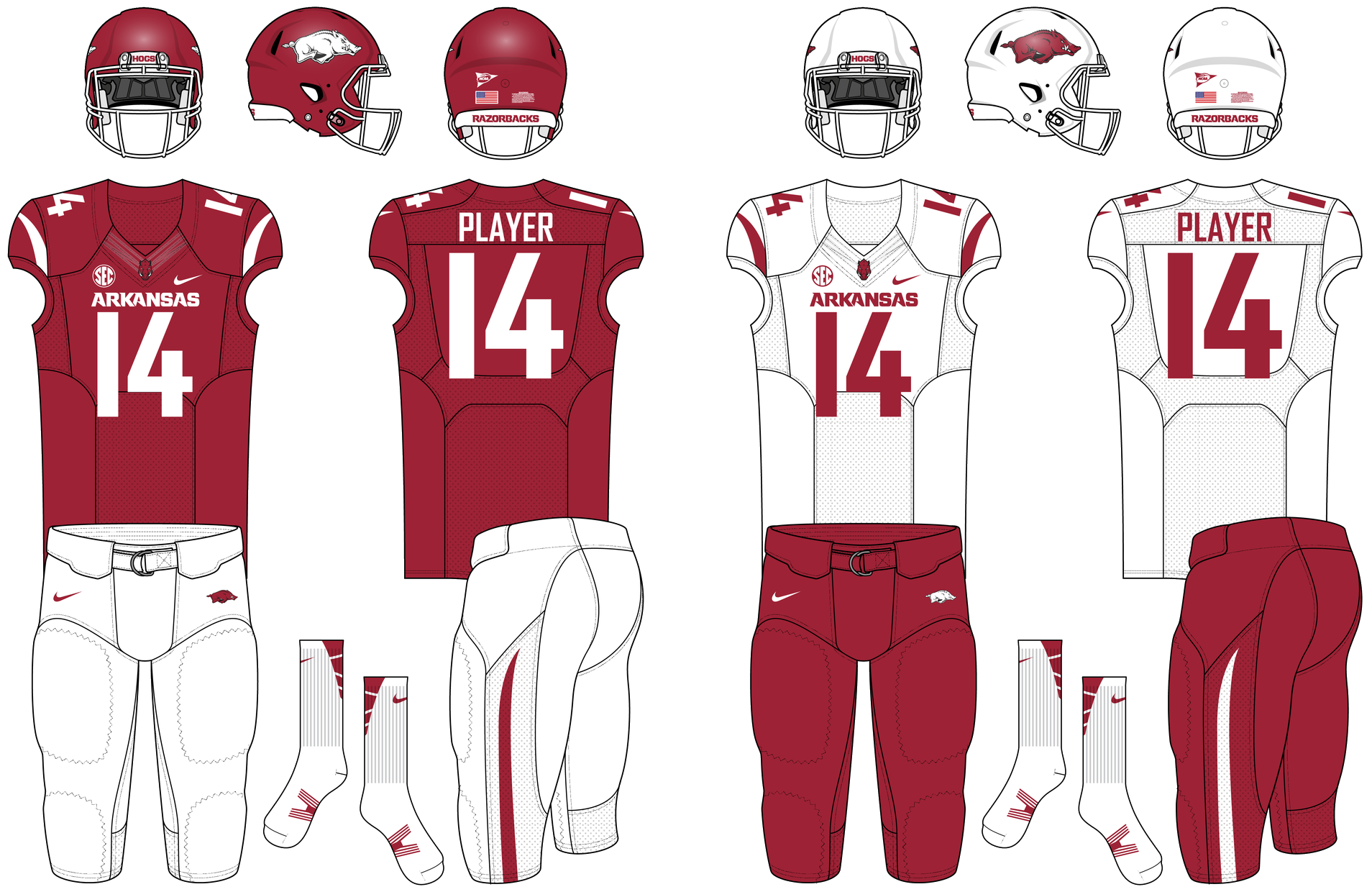

2018 Southeastern Conference football standings
	Conf.			Overall
Team	W		L	W		L
Eastern Division
No. T–7 Georgia x	7	–	1	11	–	3
No. 12 Kentucky	5	–	3	10	–	3
No. T–7 Florida	5	–	3	10	–	3
South Carolina	4	–	4	7	–	6
Missouri	4	–	4	8	–	5
Vanderbilt	3	–	5	6	–	7
Tennessee	2	–	6	5	–	7
Western Division
No. 2 Alabama x$^	8	–	0	14	–	1
No. 16 Texas A&M	5	–	3	9	–	4
No. 6 LSU	5	–	3	10	–	3
Mississippi State*	4	–	4	8	–	5
Auburn	3	–	5	8	–	5
Ole Miss	1	–	7	5	–	7
Arkansas	0	–	8	2	–	10
Championship: Alabama 35, Georgia 28
^ – College Football Playoff participant; $ – Conference champion; x – Division champion/co-champions; * Mississippi State vacated four conference and eight total wins due to NCAA violations.; Rankings from AP Poll

The 2018 Arkansas Razorbacks football team represented the University of Arkansas as a member of the Southeastern Conference (SEC) during the 2018 NCAA Division I FBS football season. Led by first-year head coach Chad Morris, the Razorbacks compiled an overall record of 2–10 with a mark of 0–8 in conference play, placing last out of seven teams in the SEC's Western Division. The team played six home games at Donald W. Reynolds Razorback Stadium in Fayetteville, Arkansas and one home game at War Memorial Stadium in Little Rock, Arkansas.

== Schedule ==
The Razorbacks' 2018 schedule consisted of seven home games, four away games, and one neutral site game. Per southernpigskin.com, the Razorbacks' schedule ranked as the 39th-toughest of the 66 Power Five teams in the nation.

Date	Time	Opponent	Site	TV	Result	Attendance	Source
September 1	3:00 p.m.	Eastern Illinois*	Donald W. Reynolds Razorback Stadium; Fayetteville, AR	SECN	W 55–20	63,342	
September 8	6:30 p.m.	at Colorado State*	Canvas Stadium; Fort Collins, CO	CBSSN	L 27–34	31,894	
September 15	3:00 p.m.	North Texas*	Donald W. Reynolds Razorback Stadium; Fayetteville, AR	SECN	L 17–44	62,355	
September 22	6:30 p.m.	at No. 9 Auburn	Jordan–Hare Stadium; Auburn, AL	SECN	L 3–34	84,188	
September 29	11:00 a.m.	vs. Texas A&M	AT&T Stadium; Arlington, TX (rivalry)	ESPN	L 17–24	55,383	
October 6	11:00 a.m.	No. 1 Alabama	Donald W. Reynolds Razorback Stadium; Fayetteville, AR	ESPN	L 31–65	64,974	
October 13	6:30 p.m.	Ole Miss	War Memorial Stadium; Little Rock, AR (rivalry)	SECN	L 33–37	51,438	
October 20	11:00 a.m.	Tulsa*^{†}	Donald W. Reynolds Razorback Stadium; Fayetteville, AR	SECN	W 23–0	56,691	
October 27	11:00 a.m.	Vanderbilt	Donald W. Reynolds Razorback Stadium; Fayetteville, AR	SECN	L 31–45	56,251	
November 10	6:30 p.m.	No. 7 LSU	Donald W. Reynolds Razorback Stadium; Fayetteville, AR (rivalry)	SECN	L 17–24	64,135	
November 17	11:00 a.m.	at No. 25 Mississippi State	Davis Wade Stadium; Starkville, MS	ESPN	L 6–52	57,772	
November 23	1:30 p.m.	at Missouri	Faurot Field; Columbia, MO (Battle Line Rivalry)	CBS	L 0–38	52,482	
*Non-conference game; ^{†}Homecoming; Rankings from AP Poll released prior to the game; All times are in Central time

== Preseason ==
- June 6, 2018: It was announced that former Arkansas tight end Will Gragg had transferred to Pittsburgh, with two years of immediate eligibility remaining.
- June 8, 2018: Arkansas wide receiver Kofi Boateng announced his retirement from football following two knee injuries.
- July 10, 2018: The Arkansas athletic department released the design of the 2018 uniform, which featured small tweaks from the past few years. These changes included the elimination of matte-finish helmets in favor of a glossier "pearl cardinal" finish, removal of details on the jersey to "de-clutter" the chest area, and a new stripe design on the pants.
- July 20, 2018: The SEC media poll was released, and placed the Razorbacks last out of the seven teams in the SEC West. The Hogs received 412 votes, 166 shy of sixth-place Ole Miss.
- July 21, 2018: The Razorbacks had three players selected to the preseason all-SEC teams. The second-team offense featured OL Hjalte Froholdt, and the third-team defense featured LB De'Jon Harris and DB Santos Ramirez.

=== Coaching changes ===
Chad Morris, former head coach at Southern Methodist University, was hired on December 6, 2017, to be the 33rd head coach of the Arkansas Razorbacks, following the dismissal of Bret Bielema just under two weeks prior. On January 9, 2018, Joe Craddock was named offensive coordinator, and John Chavis was named defensive coordinator. Both had previously served the same roles at SMU and Texas A&M, respectively.

Barry Lunney Jr., tight ends coach, and John Scott Jr., defensive line coach, were the only two assistants retained from Bielema's staff.

=== Award watch lists ===
Listed in the order that they were released

Award	Player	Position	Year
Chuck Bednarik Award	De'Jon Harris	Linebacker	Junior
Doak Walker Award	Chase Hayden	Running back	Sophomore
Doak Walker Award	Devwah Whaley	Running back	Junior
Butkus Award	Dre Greenlaw	Linebacker	Senior
Butkus Award	De'Jon Harris	Linebacker	Junior
Bronko Nagurski Trophy	De'Jon Harris	Linebacker	Junior
Outland Trophy	Hjalte Froholdt	Offensive lineman	Senior
Wuerffel Trophy	Hjalte Froholdt	Offensive lineman	Senior

=== Spring game ===
The 2018 Arkansas Red–White Spring Football Game took place at War Memorial Stadium in Little Rock, with kickoff at 1:00 p.m. CT on April 7. It was broadcast on the SEC Network. The white team consisted of the offense and the red team consisted of the defense.

The spring game followed a different format: the game was played in twelve minute quarters, rather than fifteen, with a running clock in the second half. The game was scored traditionally on offense (white team), but the defense (red team) could earn points for a variety of achievements (6 pts. for touchdown, 3 for turnover or 4th down stop, 2 for three-and-out, 2 for blocked kick, 1 for sack or TFL).

Date	Time	Spring Game	Site	TV	Result	Attendance	Source
April 7	1:00 p.m.	Red vs. White Spring Game	War Memorial Stadium • Little Rock, AR	SECN	White 27–25	7,000	

=== Preseason polls ===
Poll source	Date of poll	Arkansas rank	Source
SB Nation	February 9, 2018	51st	
Orlando Sentinel	May 28, 2018	91st	
Athlon Sports	June 20, 2018	59th	
CBS Sports	August 8, 2018	64th	
SB Nation (Note: SB Nation released a second preseason poll, with several rankings changed from the February version.)	August 22, 2018	52nd	

== Game summaries ==
=== Eastern Illinois ===
Game One – Eastern Illinois Panthers (0–0) at Arkansas Razorbacks (0–0)

Quarter	1	2	3	4	Total
Panthers	0	6	7	7	20
Razorbacks	10	28	10	7	55

at Donald W. Reynolds Razorback Stadium • Fayetteville, Arkansas

- Date: Saturday, September 1, 2018
- Game time: 3:00 p.m. CDT
- Game weather: Scattered clouds • Temperature: 83 °F (28 °C) • Wind: SE 8 mph
- Game attendance: 63,342
- Referee: David Smith (SEC)
- TV announcers (SEC Network): Dave Neal (play-by-play), D. J. Shockley (color), Dawn Davenport (sideline)

Game information

First Quarter

- (12:43) ARK – Connor Limpert 35 yard FG
  Arkansas 3–0; 6 plays, 18 yards, 1:41
- (1:46) ARK – Briston Guidry recovered fumble in end zone for TD, Connor Limpert kick
  Arkansas 10–0

Second Quarter

- (7:25) ARK – Devwah Whaley 1 yard rush, Connor Limpert kick
  Arkansas 17–0; 11 plays, 80 yards, 3:53
- (6:22) ARK – La'Michael Pettway 14 yard pass from Ty Storey, Connor Limpert kick
  Arkansas 24–0; 3 plays, 27 yards, 0:50
- (2:22) EIU – Alexander Hollins 43 yard pass from Harry Woodbery, kick blocked
  Arkansas 24–6; 2 plays, 47 yards, 0:36
- (1:20) ARK – La'Michael Pettway 48 yard pass from Ty Storey, Connor Limpert kick
  Arkansas 31–6; 4 plays, 79 yards, 1:02
- (0:45) ARK – Jordan Jones 57 yard pass from Ty Storey, Connor Limpert kick
  Arkansas 38–6; 1 play, 57 yards, 0:07

Third Quarter

- (10:54) ARK – Ty Storey 2 yard rush, Connor Limpert kick
  Arkansas 45–6; 2 plays, 5 yards, 0:37
- (5:51) EIU – Alexander Hollins 15 yard pass from Harry Woodbery, Nick Bruno kick
  Arkansas 45–13; 14 plays, 85 yards, 5:03
- (0:40) ARK – Connor Limpert 23 yard FG
  Arkansas 48–13; 10 plays, 59 yards, 5:11

Fourth Quarter

- (8:00) EIU – Alexander Hollins 16 yard pass from John Brantley, Nick Bruno kick
  Arkansas 48–20; 4 plays, 37 yards, 2:02
- (3:48) ARK – Austin Cantrell 42 yard pass from Cole Kelley, Connor Limpert kick
  Arkansas 55–20; 8 plays, 72 yards, 4:03

Top Passers

- EIU – John Brantley: 18/25, 134 yards, 1 TD
- ARK – Ty Storey: 12/17, 261 yards, 3 TD

Top Rushers

- EIU – Jamal Scott: 12 carries, 82 yards
- ARK – Devwah Whaley: 10 carries, 28 yards, 1 TD

Top Receivers

- EIU – Alexander Hollins: 9 receptions, 127 yards, 3 TD
- ARK – Jordan Jones: 5 receptions, 132 yards, 1 TD

Coach Morris named Hjalte Froholdt, Jared Cornelius, Santos Ramirez, De'Jon Harris, and Dre Greenlaw team captains for Arkansas' first game. Cole Kelley was named the starting quarterback, though Ty Storey played the majority of the game, throwing three touchdown passes. With the victory, Arkansas improved to 98–23–4 all-time in season openers, with Chad Morris becoming the eighth consecutive Razorback head coach to win their first game at Arkansas. This game also gave Arkansas a 6–0 record against current OVC members, their last win coming in 2015 against UT Martin.

=== At Colorado State ===
Game Two – Arkansas Razorbacks (1–0) at Colorado State Rams (0–2)

Quarter	1	2	3	4	Total
Razorbacks	7	6	14	0	27
Rams	3	6	8	17	34

at Canvas Stadium • Fort Collins, Colorado

- Date: Saturday, September 8, 2018
- Game time: 6:30 p.m. CDT (5:30 p.m. local)
- Game weather: Partly cloudy • Temperature: 80 °F (27 °C) • Wind: S 8 mph
- Game attendance: 31,894
- Referee: Scott Campbell (Big 12)
- TV announcers (CBS Sports Network): Carter Blackburn (play-by-play), Aaron Taylor (color), John Schriffen (sideline)

Game information

First Quarter

- (12:26) CSU – Wyatt Bryan 56 yard FG
  Colorado State 3–0; 3 plays, 6 yards, 0:39
- (2:02) ARK – Devwah Whaley 3 yard rush, Connor Limpert kick
  Arkansas 7–3; 14 plays, 73 yards, 6:06

Second Quarter

- (9:37) ARK – Connor Limpert 28 yard FG
  Arkansas 10–3; 10 plays, 70 yards, 4:04
- (6:28) ARK – Connor Limpert 31 yard FG
  Arkansas 13–3; 7 plays, 65 yards, 2:40
- (3:00) CSU – Wyatt Bryan 46 yard FG
  Arkansas 13–6; 9 plays, 47 yards, 3:28
- (0:32) CSU – Wyatt Bryan 44 yard FG
  Arkansas 13–9; 4 plays, 18 yards, 0:25

Third Quarter

- (8:42) ARK – La'Michael Pettway 25 yard pass from Cole Kelley, Connor Limpert kick
  Arkansas 20–9; 9 plays, 91 yards, 3:51
- (7:39) ARK – TJ Hammonds 64 yard TD rush, Connor Limpert kick
  Arkansas 27–9; 1 play, 64 yards, 0:11
- (2:50) CSU – Preston Williams 4 yard pass from K.J. Carta-Samuels, 2-pt. pass good
  Arkansas 27–17; 7 plays, 70 yards, 2:41

Fourth Quarter

- (11:07) CSU – Preston Williams 10 yard pass from K.J Carta-Samuels, Wyatt Bryan kick
  Arkansas 27–24; 9 plays, 96 yards, 3:29
- (5:19) CSU – Wyatt Bryan 22 yard FG
  Tied 27–27; 11 plays, 60 yards, 4:03
- (0:08) CSU – Izzy Matthews 1 yard rush, Wyatt Bryan kick
  Colorado State 34–27; 6 plays, 59 yards, 2:30

Top Passers

- ARK – Cole Kelley: 5/8, 92 yards, 2 TD
- CSU – K. J. Carta-Samuels: 32/48, 390 yards, 2 TD, 1 INT

Top Rushers

- ARK – Devwah Whaley: 26 carries, 165 yards, 1 TD
- CSU – Izzy Matthews: 9 carries, 32 yards, 1 TD

Top Receivers

- ARK – TJ Hammonds: 1 reception, 64 yards, 1 TD
- CSU – Preston Williams: 12 receptions, 154 yards, 2 TD

Coach Morris named Michael Taylor II, Armon Watts, Brian Wallace, and Jeremy Patton as the captains for Arkansas' second game. The pregame depth charts named both Cole Kelley and Ty Storey as starting quarterbacks, though Storey started the game and played the entire first half. However, he was replaced by Kelley for the second half after throwing two interceptions. The loss dropped the Razorbacks to 14–2 against current MWC opponents, with the last contest, in 2011, resulting in an Arkansas win over New Mexico.

=== North Texas ===
Game Three – North Texas Mean Green (2–0) at Arkansas Razorbacks (1–1)

Quarter	1	2	3	4	Total
Mean Green	17	17	3	7	44
Razorbacks	0	10	0	7	17

at Donald W. Reynolds Razorback Stadium • Fayetteville, Arkansas

- Date: Saturday, September 15, 2018
- Game time: 3:00 p.m. CDT
- Game weather: Partly cloudy • Temperature: 88 °F (31 °C) • Wind: NNE 6 mph
- Game attendance: 62,355
- Referee: Matt Loeffler (SEC)
- TV announcers (SEC Network): Dave LaMont (play-by-play), Ray Bentley (color), Tera Talmadge (sideline)

Game information

First Quarter

- (9:36) NT – Mason Fine 2 yard rush, Cole Hedlund kick
  North Texas 7–0; 7 plays, 44 yards, 1:43
- (6:49) NT – Keegan Brewer 90 yard punt return, Cole Hedlund kick
  North Texas 14–0
- (5:04) NT – Cole Hedlund 24 yard FG
  North Texas 17–0; 4 plays, 1 yard, 0:55

Second Quarter

- (14:08) ARK – Cole Kelley 5 yard rush, Connor Limpert kick
  North Texas 17–7; 7 plays, 61 yards, 1:36
- (9:27) ARK – Connor Limpert 54 yard FG
  North Texas 17–10; 10 plays, 49 yards, 2:55
- (7:21) NT – Loren Easly 3 yard rush, Cole Hedlund kick
  North Texas 24–10; 2 plays, 34 yards, 0:30
- (2:55) NT – Rico Bussey 7 yard pass from Mason Fine, Cole Hedlund kick
  North Texas 31–10; 8 plays, 80 yards, 2:46
- (0:10) NT – Cole Hedlund 26 yard FG
  North Texas 34–10; 7 plays, 40 yards, 1:26

Third Quarter

- (9:26) NT – Cole Hedlund 20 yard FG
  North Texas 37–10; 14 plays, 72 yards, 5:34

Fourth Quarter

- (7:42) NT – Kemon Hall 24 yard interception return, Cole Hedlund kick
  North Texas 44–10
- (0:53) ARK – Maleek Williams 68 yard rush, Connor Limpert kick
  North Texas 44–17; 1 play, 68 yards, 0:12

Top Passers

- NT – Mason Fine: 24/45, 281 yards, 1 TD
- ARK – Cole Kelley: 16/35, 185 yards, 4 INT

Top Rushers

- NT – Loren Easly: 13 carries, 68 yards, 1 TD
- ARK – Maleek Williams: 5 carries, 74 yards, 1 TD

Top Receivers

- NT – Jaelon Darden: 5 receptions, 87 yards
- ARK – Michael Woods II: 4 receptions, 61 yards

For Arkansas' third game, Coach Morris named Jonathan Nance, McTelvin Agim, Deion Malone, and Nate Dalton as captains. For the second straight game, the pregame depth chart listed both Kelley and Storey as starting quarterbacks; Kelley ultimately got the start and played into the third quarter before being replaced by freshman Connor Noland, who shared the remaining drives with freshman John Stephen Jones. The loss dropped Arkansas to 54–30 against current C–USA opponents, 10–1 since joining the SEC.

=== At No. 9 Auburn ===
Game Four – Arkansas Razorbacks (1–2) at No. 9 Auburn Tigers (2–1)

Quarter	1	2	3	4	Total
Razorbacks	0	0	3	0	3
No. 9 Tigers	10	7	7	10	34

at Jordan–Hare Stadium • Auburn, Alabama

- Date: Saturday, September 22, 2018
- Game time: 6:30 p.m. CDT
- Game weather: Partly cloudy • Temperature: 85 °F (29 °C) • Wind: SE 9 mph
- Game attendance: 84,188
- Referee: Ken Williamson (SEC)
- TV announcers (SEC Network): Tom Hart (play-by-play), Jordan Rodgers (color), Cole Cubelic (sideline)

Game information

First Quarter

- (10:36) AUB – Jatarvious Whitlow 5 yard rush, Anders Carlson kick
  Auburn 7–0; 7 plays, 27 yards, 2:21
- (0:23) AUB – Anders Carlson 18 yard FG
  Auburn 10–0; 3 plays, 1 yard, 1:23

Second Quarter

- (0:49) AUB – Jarrett Stidham 4 yard rush, Anders Carlson kick
  Auburn 17–0; 5 plays, 6 yards, 2:19

Third Quarter

- (9:22) ARK – Connor Limpert 29 yard FG
  Auburn 17–3; 9 plays, 68 yards, 3:47
- (9:05) AUB – Noah Igbinoghene 96 yard kickoff return, Anders Carlson kick
  Auburn 24–3

Fourth Quarter

- (8:18) AUB – Jatarvious Whitlow 15 yard rush, Anders Carlson kick
  Auburn 31–3; 8 plays, 72 yards, 3:51
- (3:21) AUB – Anders Carlson 43 yard FG
  Auburn 34–3; 4 plays, –3 yards, 2:30

Top Passers

- ARK – Ty Storey: 13/31, 141 yards, 1 INT
- AUB – Jarrett Stidham: 15/22, 134 yards

Top Rushers

- ARK – Rakeem Boyd: 8 carries, 66 yards
- AUB – Jatarvious Whitlow: 13 carries, 49 yards, 2 TD

Top Receivers

- ARK – Rakeem Boyd: 2 receptions, 39 yards
- AUB – Ryan Davis: 6 receptions, 40 yards

Coach Morris named Randy Ramsey, Jared Cornelius, Hjalte Froholdt, and Santos Ramirez to be captains for Arkansas' fourth game. For the first time this season, Ty Storey was named the sole starting quarterback; he played the entire game, save for a few snaps given to Kelley.

=== Vs. Texas A&M ===
Game Five – Arkansas Razorbacks (1–3) vs. Texas A&M Aggies (2–2)

Quarter	1	2	3	4	Total
Razorbacks	0	7	3	7	17
Aggies	14	3	0	7	24

at AT&T Stadium • Arlington, Texas

- Date: Saturday, September 29, 2018
- Game time: 11:00 a.m. CDT
- Game weather: n/a (game played indoors)
- Game attendance: 55,383
- Referee: James Carter (SEC)
- TV announcers (ESPN): Bob Wischusen (play-by-play), Brock Huard (color), Allison Williams (sideline)

Game information

First Quarter

- (14:46) A&M – Jashaun Corbin 100 yard kickoff return, Seth Small kick
  Texas A&M 7–0
- (8:44) A&M – Trayveon Williams 1 yard rush, Seth Small kick
  Texas A&M 14–0; 8 plays, 79 yards, 4:50

Second Quarter

- (12:36) A&M – Seth Small 30 yard FG
  Texas A&M 17–0; 7 plays, 48 yards, 2:36
- (9:35) ARK – Cole Kelley 1 yard rush, Connor Limpert kick
  Texas A&M 17–7; 7 plays, 75 yards, 3:01

Third Quarter

- (11:16) ARK – Connor Limpert 47 yard FG
  Texas A&M 17–10; 9 plays, 46 yards, 3:44

Fourth Quarter

- (5:03) A&M – Trayveon Williams 4 yard rush, Seth Small kick
  Texas A&M 24–10; 7 plays, 61 yards, 3:31
- (3:16) ARK – Michael Woods II 29 yard pass from Ty Storey, Connor Limpert kick
  Texas A&M 24–17; 6 plays, 75 yards, 1:47

Top Passers

- ARK – Ty Storey: 14/26, 193 yards, 1 TD, 1 INT
- A&M – Kellen Mond: 17/26, 201 yards, 2 INT

Top Rushers

- ARK – Rakeem Boyd: 10 carries, 47 yards
- A&M – Trayveon Williams: 29 yards, 152 yards, 2 TD

Top Receivers

- ARK – Cheyenne O'Grady: 3 receptions, 77 yards
- A&M – Camron Buckley: 5 receptions, 72 yards

Prior to Arkansas' fifth game, Chad Morris named the permanent captains for the remainder of the season: Santos Ramirez, Hjalte Froholdt, Dre Greenlaw, and De'Jon Harris. For the second game in a row, Ty Storey was named the starting quarterback.

=== No. 1 Alabama ===
Game Six – No. 1 Alabama Crimson Tide (5–0) at Arkansas Razorbacks (1–4)

Quarter	1	2	3	4	Total
No. 1 Crimson Tide	21	20	7	17	65
Razorbacks	7	7	3	14	31

at Donald W. Reynolds Razorback Stadium • Fayetteville, Arkansas

- Date: Saturday, October 6, 2018
- Game time: 11:00 a.m. CDT
- Game weather: Mostly cloudy • Temperature: 78 °F (26 °C) • Wind: S 13 mph
- Game attendance: 64,974
- Referee: John McDaid (SEC)
- TV announcers (ESPN): Dave Pasch (play-by-play), Greg McElroy (color), Tom Luginbill (sideline)

Game information

First Quarter

- (14:39) BAMA – Irv Smith Jr. 76 yard pass from Tua Tagovailoa, Joseph Bulovas kick
  Alabama 7–0; 1 play, 76 yards, 0:21
- (10:18) BAMA – Henry Ruggs advanced BAMA fumble for TD, Joseph Bulovas kick
  Alabama 14–0; 2 plays, 55 yards, 0:50
- (5:38) BAMA – Josh Jacobs 1 yard rush, Joseph Bulovas kick
  Alabama 21–0; 8 plays, 76 yards, 2:51
- (0:24) ARK – Cheyenne O'Grady 8 yard pass from Ty Storey, Connor Limpert kick
  Alabama 21–7; 11 plays, 65 yards, 5:14

Second Quarter

- (10:12) BAMA – Jerry Jeudy 42 yard pass from Tua Tagovailoa, Joseph Bulovas kick
  Alabama 28–7; 5 plays, 99 yards, 1:55
- (6:09) ARK – Cheyenne O'Grady 3 yard pass from Ty Storey, Connor Limpert kick
  Alabama 28–14; 7 plays, 75 yards, 4:03
- (2:49) BAMA – Damien Harris 2 yard rush, kick failed
  Alabama 34–14; 8 plays, 74 yards, 3:20
- (1:38) BAMA – Jerry Jeudy 60 yard pass from Tua Tagovailoa, Joseph Bulovas kick
  Alabama 41–14; 1 play, 60 yards, 0:12

Third Quarter

- (8:47) BAMA – Damien Harris 1 yard rush, Joseph Bulovas kick
  Alabama 48–14; 7 plays, 44 yards, 3:14
- (3:25) ARK – Connor Limpert 40 yard FG
  Alabama 48–17; 11 plays, 52 yards, 5:21

Fourth Quarter

- (13:43) BAMA – Joseph Bulovas 27 yard FG
  Alabama 51–17; 10 plays, 58 yards, 4:49
- (12:15) BAMA – Shyheim Carter 44 yard interception return, Joseph Bulovas kick
  Alabama 58–17
- (8:58) ARK – De'Vion Warren 17 yard pass from Ty Storey, Connor Limpert kick
  Alabama 58–24; 7 plays, 75 yards, 3:17
- (2:07) BAMA – Brian Robinson Jr. 5 yard rush, Joseph Bulovas kick
  Alabama 65–24; 11 plays, 65 yards, 6:51
- (0:18) ARK – Cole Kelley 1 yard rush, Connor Limpert kick
  Alabama 65–31; 6 plays, 65 yards, 1:41

Top Passers

- BAMA – Tua Tagovailoa: 10/13, 334 yards, 4 TD
- ARK – Ty Storey: 25/39, 230 yards, 2 TD, 1 INT

Top Rushers

- BAMA – Damien Harris: 15 carries, 111 yards, 2 TD
- ARK – Rakeem Boyd: 15 carries, 102 yards

Top Receivers

- BAMA – Jerry Jeudy: 4 receptions, 135 yards, 2 TD
- ARK – Cheyenne O'Grady: 7 receptions, 48 yards, 2 TD

For the third consecutive game, pregame depth charts listed Ty Storey as Arkansas' starting quarterback. This was Arkansas' 24th matchup against an AP No. 1 team; the loss dropped them to 4–20. Additionally, Cheyenne O'Grady became only the 3rd SEC player to score two receiving touchdowns in one half against a Nick Saban–led Alabama team.

=== Ole Miss ===
Game Seven – Ole Miss Rebels (4–2) at Arkansas Razorbacks (1–5)

Quarter	1	2	3	4	Total
Rebels	3	14	7	13	37
Razorbacks	17	10	6	0	33

at War Memorial Stadium • Little Rock, Arkansas

- Date: Saturday, October 13, 2018
- Game time: 6:30 p.m. CDT
- Game weather: Rain • Temperature: 55 °F (13 °C) • Wind: ENE 12 mph
- Game attendance: 51,438
- Referee: Marc Curles (SEC)
- TV announcers (SEC Network): Tom Hart (play-by-play), Jordan Rodgers (color), Cole Cubelic (sideline)

Game information

First Quarter

- (13:25) MISS – Luke Logan 36 yard FG
  Ole Miss 3–0; 6 plays, 46 yards, 1:35
- (8:20) ARK – Connor Limpert 43 yard FG
  Tied 3–3; 11 plays, 40 yards, 4:29
- (3:32) ARK – Cheyenne O'Grady 39 yard pass from Ty Storey, Connor Limpert kick
  Arkansas 10–3; 7 plays, 78 yards, 2:53
- (0:40) ARK – Rakeem Boyd 69 yard rush, Connor Limpert kick
  Arkansas 17–3; 3 plays, 80 yards, 0:55

Second Quarter

- (12:30) MISS – Jordan Ta'amu 18 yard rush, Luke Logan kick
  Arkansas 17–10; 10 plays, 75 yards, 3:01
- (10:55) ARK – La'Michael Pettway 39 yard pass from Cole Kelley, Connor Limpert kick
  Arkansas 24–10; 7 plays, 75 yards, 1:28
- (2:36) ARK – Connor Limpert 38 yard FG
  Arkansas 27–10; 8 plays, 52 yards, 3:49
- (0:33) MISS – Damarkus Lodge 6 yard pass from Jordan Ta'amu, Luke Logan kick
  Arkansas 27–17; 10 plays, 77 yards, 2:03

Third Quarter

- (9:28) ARK – Connor Limpert 38 yard FG
  Arkansas 30–17; 10 plays, 55 yards, 5:32
- (7:29) MISS – Octavious Cooley 66 yard pass from Jordan Ta’amu, Luke Logan kick
  Arkansas 30–24; 5 plays, 79 yards, 1:59
- (2:33) ARK – Connor Limpert 36 yard FG
  Arkansas 33–24; 11 plays, 57 yards, 4:56

Fourth Quarter

- (4:15) MISS – Isaiah Woullard 2 yard rush, Luke Logan kick
  Arkansas 33–31; 10 plays, 84 yards, 2:54
- (0:42) MISS – Scottie Phillips 9 yard rush, 2-pt. failed
  Ole Miss 37–33; 7 plays, 97 yards, 1:20

Top Passers

- MISS – Jordan Ta’amu: 26/35, 387 yards, 2 TD, 1 INT
- ARK – Ty Storey: 12/16, 122 yards, 1 TD

Top Rushers

- MISS – Jordan Ta’amu: 17 carries, 141 yards, 1 TD
- ARK – Rakeem Boyd: 7 carries, 109 yards, 1 TD

Top Receivers

- MISS – Octavious Cooley: 2 receptions, 85 yards, 1 TD
- ARK – La’Michael Pettway: 3 receptions, 77 yards, 1 TD

This game was the first since 2014 that Arkansas faced an SEC opponent in Little Rock.

=== Tulsa ===
Game Eight – Tulsa Golden Hurricane (1–5) at Arkansas Razorbacks (1–6)

Quarter	1	2	3	4	Total
Golden Hurricane	0	0	0	0	0
Razorbacks	0	10	10	3	23

at Donald W. Reynolds Razorback Stadium • Fayetteville, Arkansas

- Date: Saturday, October 20, 2018
- Game time: 11:00 a.m. CDT
- Game weather: Sunny • Temperature: 55 °F (13 °C) • Wind: N 6 mph
- Game attendance: 56,691
- Referee: Matt Austin (SEC)
- TV announcers (SEC Network): Taylor Zarzour (play-by-play), Matt Stinchcomb (color), Kris Budden (sideline)

Game information

First Quarter
No scoring
Second Quarter

- (14:14) ARK – Connor Limpert 33 yard FG
  Arkansas 3–0; 9 plays, 60 yards, 4:20
- (1:25) ARK – Grayson Gunter 7 yard pass from Connor Noland, Connor Limpert kick
  Arkansas 10–0; 8 plays, 49 yards, 3:29

Third Quarter

- (9:07) ARK – Connor Limpert 35 yard FG
  Arkansas 13–0; 7 plays, 10 yards, 2:56
- (5:38) ARK – Maleek Williams 4 yard rush, Connor Limpert kick
  Arkansas 20–0; 3 plays, 40 yards, 1:23

Fourth Quarter

- (1:20) ARK – Connor Limpert 24 yard FG
  Arkansas 23–0; 16 plays, 74 yards, 8:19

Top Passers

- TULS – Seth Boomer: 8/25, 127 yards, 1 INT
- ARK – Connor Noland: 10/16, 124 yards, 1 TD, 1 INT

Top Rushers

- TULS – Shamari Brooks: 21 carries, 85 yards
- ARK – Rakeem Boyd: 22 carries, 95 yards

Top Receivers

- TULS – Keylon Stokes: 3 receptions, 74 yards
- ARK – Cheyenne O'Grady: 2 receptions, 35 yards

For the fourth time in the last five years, the Razorbacks faced a non–P5 opponent for their homecoming game. After Ty Storey was injured against Ole Miss, freshman Connor Noland was named the starter. Noland played into the third quarter until he was injured on a hit and momentarily replaced by Cole Kelley. He and Kelley shared the remainder of the snaps in the game.

=== Vanderbilt ===
Game Nine – Vanderbilt Commodores (3–5) at Arkansas Razorbacks (2–6)

Quarter	1	2	3	4	Total
Commodores	7	14	3	21	45
Razorbacks	7	7	3	14	31

at Donald W. Reynolds Razorback Stadium • Fayetteville, Arkansas

- Date: Saturday, October 27, 2018
- Game time: 11:00 a.m. CDT
- Game weather: Sunny • Temperature: 61 °F (16 °C) • Wind: W 7 mph
- Game attendance: 56,251
- Referee: Hubert Owens (SEC)
- TV announcers (SEC Network): Dave Neal (play-by-play), D. J. Shockley (color), Dawn Davenport (sideline)

Game information

First Quarter

- (11:55) ARK – Rakeem Boyd 5 yard rush, Connor Limpert kick
  Arkansas 7–0; 9 plays, 75 yards, 3:05
- (8:02) VAN – Ke'Shawn Vaughn 63 yard rush, Ryley Guay kick
  Tied 7–7; 7 plays, 89 yards, 3:53

Second Quarter

- (13:46) VAN – Jared Pinkney 1 yard pass from Kyle Shurmur, Ryley Guay kick
  Vanderbilt 14–7; 6 plays, 42 yards, 2:39
- (6:45) ARK – Chase Hayden 38 yard rush, Connor Limpert kick
  Tied 14–14; 8 plays, 92 yards, 3:45
- (5:14) VAN – Jared Pinkney 40 yard pass from Kyle Shurmur, Ryley Guay kick
  Vanderbilt 21–14; 3 plays, 65 yards, 1:31

Third Quarter

- (8:39) ARK – Connor Limpert 55 yard FG
  Vanderbilt 21–17; 9 plays, 35 yards, 3:40
- (1:15) VAN – Ryley Guay 36 yard FG
  Vanderbilt 24–17; 14 plays, 57 yards, 7:24

Fourth Quarter

- (11:31) VAN – Ke'Shawn Vaughn 11 yard rush, Ryley Guay kick
  Vanderbilt 31–17; 7 plays, 76 yards, 3:41
- (9:25) ARK – Tyson Morris 11 yard pass from Ty Storey, Connor Limpert kick
  Vanderbilt 31–24; 6 plays, 75 yards, 2:06
- (4:40) VAN – Ke'Shawn Vaughn 3 yard rush, Ryley Guay kick
  Vanderbilt 38–24; 9 plays, 75 yards, 4:45
- (1:20) VAN – Khari Blasingame 5 yard rush, Ryley Guay kick
  Vanderbilt 45–24; 7 plays, 29 yards, 2:34
- (0:14) ARK – Cheyenne O'Grady 12 yard pass from Ty Storey, Connor Limpert kick
  Vanderbilt 45–31; 7 plays, 75 yards, 1:06

Top Passers

- VAN – Kyle Shurmur: 13/19, 192 yards, 2 TD
- ARK – Ty Storey: 23/26, 240 yards, 2 TD, 2 INT

Top Rushers

- VAN – Ke'Shawn Vaughn: 26 carries, 172 yards, 3 TD
- ARK – Rakeem Boyd: 19 carries, 113 yards, 1 TD

Top Receivers

- VAN – Jared Pinkney: 5 receptions, 93 yards, 2 TD
- ARK – Cheyenne O'Grady: 6 receptions, 83 yards, 1 TD

=== No. 9 LSU ===
Game Ten – No. 9 LSU Tigers (7–2) at Arkansas Razorbacks (2–7)

Quarter	1	2	3	4	Total
No. 9 Tigers	7	7	10	0	24
Razorbacks	0	3	0	14	17

at Donald W. Reynolds Razorback Stadium • Fayetteville, Arkansas

- Date: Saturday, November 10, 2018
- Game time: 6:30 p.m. CST
- Game weather: Clear • Temperature: 38 °F (3 °C) • Wind: SSW 5 mph
- Game attendance: 64,135
- Referee: Lee Hedrick (SEC)
- TV announcers (SEC Network): Tom Hart (play-by-play), Jordan Rodgers (color), Cole Cubelic (sideline)

Game information

First Quarter

- (7:30) LSU – Justin Jefferson 40 yard pass from Joe Burrow, Cole Tracy kick
  LSU 7–0; 1 play, 40 yards, 0:09

Second Quarter

- (5:24) LSU – Nick Brossette 12 yard rush, Cole Tracy kick
  LSU 14–0; 14 plays, 77 yards, 7:24
- (0:00) ARK – Connor Limpert 24 yard FG
  LSU 14–3; 4 plays, 27 yards, 0:21

Third Quarter

- (9:44) LSU – Clyde Edwards-Helaire 13 yard rush, Cole Tracy kick
  LSU 21–3; 4 plays, 59 yards, 2:07
- (3:12) LSU – Cole Tracy 40 yard FG
  LSU 24–3; 5 plays, 30 yards, 2:56

Fourth Quarter

- (12:37) ARK – Cheyenne O'Grady 11 yard pass from Ty Storey, Connor Limpert kick
  LSU 24–10; 8 plays, 76 yards, 2:16
- (5:27) ARK – Cheyenne O'Grady 32 yard pass from Ty Storey, Connor Limpert kick
  LSU 24–17; 6 plays, 75 yards, 1:33

Top Passers

- LSU – Joe Burrow: 15/21, 195 yards, 1 TD
- ARK – Ty Storey: 19/38, 200 yards, 2 TD, 1 INT

Top Rushers

- LSU – Nick Brossette, 23 carries, 90 yards, 1 TD
- ARK – Rakeem Boyd: 10 carries, 30 yards

Top Receivers

- LSU – Justin Jefferson: 6 receptions, 117 yards, 1 TD
- ARK – Cheyenne O'Grady: 6 receptions, 75 yards, 2 TD

=== At No. 25 Mississippi State ===
Game Eleven – Arkansas Razorbacks (2–8) at Mississippi State Bulldogs (6–4)

Quarter	1	2	3	4	Total
Razorbacks	0	3	3	0	6
No. 25 Bulldogs	3	14	21	14	52

at Davis Wade Stadium • Starkville, Mississippi

- Date: Saturday, November 17, 2018
- Game time: 11:00 a.m. CST
- Game weather: Clear • Temperature: 59 °F (15 °C) • Wind: SSE 2 mph
- Game attendance: 57,772
- Referee: Matt Loeffler (SEC)
- TV announcers (ESPN): Adam Amin (play-by-play), Rod Gilmore (color), Quint Kessenich (sideline)

Game information

First Quarter

- (8:27) MSST – Jace Christmann 19 yard FG
  Mississippi State 3–0; 14 plays, 81 yards, 6:33

Second Quarter

- (10:28) MSST – Nick Fitzgerald 2 yard rush, Jace Christmann kick
  Mississippi State 10–0; 11 plays, 53 yards, 4:53
- (5:20) MSST – Nick Gibson 8 yard rush, Jace Christmann kick
  Mississippi State 17–0; 8 plays, 72 yards, 4:11
- (0:32) ARK – Connor Limpert 36 yard FG
  Mississippi State 17–3; 13 plays, 52 yards, 2:48

Third Quarter

- (11:19) ARK – Connor Limpert 32 yard FG
  Mississippi State 17–6; 7 plays, 60 yards, 3:35
- (8:42) MSST – Justin Johnson 34 yard pass from Nick Fitzgerald, Jace Christmann kick
  Mississippi State 24–6; 6 plays, 75 yards, 2:37
- (7:41) MSST – Keith Mixon 4 yard pass from Nick Fitzgerald, Jace Christmann kick
  Mississippi State 31–6; 1 play, 4 yards, 0:04
- (3:02) MSST – Osirus Mitchell 15 yard pass from Nick Fitzgerald, Jordan Lawless kick
  Mississippi State 38–6; 3 plays, 58 yards, 1:17

Fourth Quarter

- (13:04) MSST – Austin Williams 19 yard pass from Nick Fitzgerald, Jordan Lawless kick
  Mississippi State 45–6; 6 plays, 50 yards, 3:02
- (5:20) MSST – Austin Williams 33 yard pass from Keytaon Thompson, Jordan Lawless kick
  Mississippi State 52–6; 8 plays, 72 yards, 4:01

Top Passers

- ARK – Ty Storey: 16/27, 137 yards, 1 INT
- MSST – Nick Fitzgerald: 9/14, 127 yards, 4 TD

Top Rushers

- ARK – Rakeem Boyd: 14 carries, 84 yards
- MSST – Aeris Williams: 15 carries, 104 yards

Top Receivers

- ARK – La'Michael Pettway: 4 receptions, 85 yards
- MSST – Justin Johnson: 3 receptions, 59 yards, 1 TD

=== At Missouri ===
Game Twelve – Arkansas Razorbacks (2–9) at Missouri Tigers (7–4)

Quarter	1	2	3	4	Total
Razorbacks	0	0	0	0	0
Tigers	7	21	10	0	38

at Faurot Field at Memorial Stadium • Columbia, Missouri

- Date: Friday, November 23, 2018
- Game time: 1:30 p.m. CST
- Game weather: Rainy • Temperature: 50 °F (10 °C) • Wind: S 15 mph
- Game attendance: 52,482
- Referee: David Smith (SEC)
- TV announcers (CBS): Carter Blackburn (play-by-play), Aaron Taylor (color), Rick Neuheisel (color), John Schriffen (sideline)

Game information

First Quarter

- (10:54) MIZ – Drew Lock 9 yard rush, Tucker McCann kick
  Missouri 7–0; 11 plays, 75 yards, 4:06

Second Quarter

- (13:11) MIZ – Drew Lock 3 yard rush, Tucker McCann kick
  Missouri 14–0; 6 plays, 35 yards, 2:18
- (12:33) MIZ – Akial Byers recovered fumble in end zone, Tucker McCann kick
  Missouri 21–0
- (0:35) MIZ – Emanuel Hall 6 yard pass from Drew Lock, Tucker McCann kick
  Missouri 28–0; 6 plays, 43 yards, 1:04

Third Quarter

- (8:19) MIZ – Emanuel Hall 67 yard pass from Drew Lock, Tucker McCann kick
  Missouri 35–0; 9 plays, 96 yards, 3:31
- (1:48) MIZ – Tucker McCann 42 yard FG
  Missouri 38–0; 10 plays, 37 yards, 4:33

Fourth Quarter
No scoring

Top Passers

- ARK – Connor Noland: 5/17, 98 yards
- MIZ – Drew Lock: 16/25, 221 yards, 2 TD

Top Rushers

- ARK – Devwah Whaley: 13 carries, 54 yards
- MIZ – Larry Rountree III: 29 carries, 119 yards

Top Receivers

- ARK – Devwah Whaley: 2 receptions, 61 yards
- MIZ – Emanuel Hall: 6 receptions, 153 yards, 2 TD

== Personnel ==
=== Coaching staff ===
Name	Position	Consecutive season at Arkansas in current position	Alma mater
Chad Morris	Head coach	1st	Texas A&M '92
Joe Craddock	Offensive coordinator/Quarterbacks	1st	Middle Tennessee '08
John Chavis	Defensive coordinator/Linebackers	1st	Tennessee '78
Jeff Traylor	Associate head coach/Running backs	1st	Stephen F. Austin '90
Barry Lunney Jr.	Tight ends	6th	Arkansas '96
Justin Stepp	Wide receivers	1st	Furman '07
Dustin Fry	Offensive line	1st	Clemson '06
Steve Caldwell	Defensive line	1st	Arkansas State '77
John Scott Jr.	Defensive line	2nd	Western Carolina '00
Ron Cooper	Secondary	1st	Jacksonville State '83
Mark Smith	Secondary	1st	Hardin–Simmons '00
Trumain Carroll	Head strength & conditioning coach	1st	Oklahoma State '05

=== Roster ===
2018 Arkansas Razorbacks football team roster
Players
Coaches
Offense

Pos.	#	Name	Class
WR	1	Jared Cornelius	Sr
RB	2	Chase Hayden	So
WR	3	Koilan Jackson	Fr
QB	4	Ty Storey	Jr
RB	5	Rakeem Boyd	So
RB	6	T. J. Hammonds	Jr
WR	7	Jonathan Nance	Sr
WR	8	Michael Woods II	Fr
WR	9	De'Vion Warren	So
WR	10	Jordan Jones	So
QB	11	Daulton Hyatt	Fr
WR	13	Deon Stewart	Jr
RB	14	Maleek Barkley	Fr
QB	14	Carson Proctor	So
QB	15	Cole Kelley	So
WR	16	La'Michael Pettway	Jr
QB	17	Austin Aune	Fr
QB	18	Jack Lindsey	So
TE	18	Jeremy Patton	Sr
WR	19	Tyson Morris	Fr
RB	21	Devwah Whaley	Jr
RB	23	Maleek Williams	Fr
RB	24	Kasey Montrois	Fr
RB	26	Justice Hobbs	So
FB	32	Hayden Johnson	Jr
FB	34	Kendrick Jackson	Sr
TE	39	Jackson Pace	Fr
TE	40	Trey Purifoy	Jr
TE	44	Austin Cantrell	Jr
OL	51	Hjalte Froholdt (c)	Sr
OL	57	Shane Clenin	Fr
OL	60	Brian Wallace	Sr
OL	62	Johnny Gibson Jr.	Sr
OL	64	Audry Horn	Fr
OL	66	Ty Clary	So
OL	67	Tyler Hall	So
OL	68	Kirby Adcock	Fr
OL	69	Dylan Hays	So
OL	74	Colton Jackson	Jr
OL	78	Dalton Wagner	Fr
OL	79	Jalen Merrick	Jr
TE	80	Will Gragg	Jr
WR	81	Jarrod Barnes	So
WR	82	Gary Cross	Sr
WR	83	De'Shawn Gulledge	Fr
TE	85	Cheyenne O'Grady	Jr
WR	86	Tobias Enlow	So
TE	87	Blake Kern	So
TE	89	Grayson Gunter	So

Defense

Pos.	#	Name	Class
DB	1	Chevin Calloway	So
DB	2	Kamren Curl	So
DL	3	McTelvin Agim	Jr
LB	4	Alexy Jean-Baptiste	So
DL	6	Gabe Richardson	Jr
DL	7	Briston Guidry	So
LB	8	De'Jon Harris (c)	Jr
DB	9	Santos Ramirez (c)	Sr
DL	10	Randy Ramsey	Sr
DB	11	Ryan Pulley	Sr
DB	13	Nate Dalton	Jr
DB	14	Britto Tutt	Jr
DB	15	Korey Hernandez	Fr
LB	16	Bumper Pool	Fr
DB	18	Matt Berry	Jr
LB	20	Giovanni LaFrance	So
DB	21	Montaric Brown	Fr
LB	22	Deon Edwards	So
LB	23	Dre Greenlaw (c)	Sr
DB	24	Jarques McClellion	Fr
DB	25	Micahh Smith	So
DB	26	Ryder Lucas	Sr
LB	27	Hayden Henry	So
DB	28	Jayden Minchew	So
LB	29	Derrick Munson	So
DB	30	Kevin Richardson III	Sr
LB	31	Grant Morgan	So
DB	32	Jordon Curtis	Fr
LB	33	Dee Walker	So
LB	34	Tyler Phillips	Jr
LB	36	D'Vone McClure	So
DB	37	Brenden Young	Jr
DB	38	Reid Miller	Sr
DB	39	Byron Keaton	Jr
LB	40	Kyrei Fisher	So
DL	41	Austin Capps	Jr
DL	42	Jonathan Marshall	So
DB	45	Simeon Blair	Fr
LB	46	Damani Carter	Jr
LB	47	Tyler Pennington	Fr
LB	49	McKinley Williams	Fr
DL	52	T.J. Smith	Jr
LB	53	Ben Brasuell	So
LB	54	Terrell Collins	So
LB	56	Ma'Laizh Surrell	Fr
DL	71	David Porter	Fr
DL	73	Deion Malone	Sr
DL	86	Jamario Bell	Jr
DL	90	Armon Watts	Sr
DL	91	Michael Taylor II	Sr
DL	92	Elias Hale	So
DL	93	Isaiah Nichols	Fr
DL	95	Jake Hall	Sr
DL	97	Brandon DePrato	So

Special teams

Pos.	#	Name	Class
P	18	Blake Johnson	Jr
K	19	Connor Limpert	Jr
LS	43	George Madden	Jr
LS	48	Jordan Silver	Fr
P	92	Chad Stephens	So

Head coach

- Chad Morris

Coordinators/assistant coaches

- Joe Craddock (OC)
- John Chavis (DC)

Legend

- (C) Team captain
- (S) Suspended
- (I) Ineligible
- Injured
- Redshirt

Roster

=== Team captains ===
Prior to the season, head coach Chad Morris announced that permanent captains would not be announced until later in the season, and the captain spots would rotate until then.

- Week 1 vs. EIU: #51 Hjalte Froholdt (senior OL), #1 Jared Cornelius (senior WR), #9 Santos Ramirez (senior DB), #8 De'Jon Harris (junior LB), #23 Dre Greenlaw (senior LB)
- Week 2 vs. CSU: #91 Michael Taylor II (senior DL), #90 Armon Watts (senior DL), #60 Brian Wallace (senior OL), #18 Jeremy Patton (senior TE)
- Week 3 vs. NT: #7 Jonathan Nance (senior WR), #3 McTelvin Agim (junior DL), #73 Deion Malone (senior DL), #13 Nate Dalton (junior DB)
- Week 4 vs. AUB: #10 Randy Ramsey (senior DL), #1 Jared Cornelius (senior WR), #51 Hjalte Froholdt (senior OL), #9 Santos Ramirez (senior DB)

Prior to the Week 5 game against Texas A&M, permanent captains were announced.

- Permanent season captains: #51 Hjalte Froholdt (senior OL), #8 De'Jon Harris (junior LB), #9 Santos Ramirez (senior DB), #23 Dre Greenlaw (senior LB)

=== Recruits ===
The Razorbacks signed a total of 17 recruits.

College recruiting information
Name	Hometown	School	Height	Weight	Commit date
Connor Noland; QB	Greenwood, Arkansas	Greenwood High School	6 ft 3 in (1.91 m)	205 lb (93 kg)	Jul 20, 2016
Connor Noland; QB	Recruit ratings: Scout: Rivals: 247Sports: ESPN:				
Bumper Pool; LB	Lucas, Texas	Lovejoy High School	6 ft 3 in (1.91 m)	220 lb (100 kg)	Nov 7, 2016
Bumper Pool; LB	Recruit ratings: Scout: Rivals: 247Sports: ESPN:				
Isaiah Nichols; DE	Springdale, Arkansas	Springdale High School	6 ft 4 in (1.93 m)	275 lb (125 kg)	Jun 21, 2017
Isaiah Nichols; DE	Recruit ratings: Scout: Rivals: 247Sports: ESPN:				
Noah Gatlin; OT	Jonesboro, Arkansas	Jonesboro High School	6 ft 7 in (2.01 m)	300 lb (140 kg)	Jun 21, 2017
Noah Gatlin; OT	Recruit ratings: Scout: Rivals: 247Sports: ESPN:				
Michael Woods II; WR	Magnolia, Texas	Magnolia High School	6 ft 1 in (1.85 m)	188 lb (85 kg)	Dec 10, 2017
Michael Woods II; WR	Recruit ratings: Scout: Rivals: 247Sports: ESPN:				
Ladarrius Bishop; CB	Ashdown, Arkansas	Ashdown High School	6 ft 0 in (1.83 m)	189 lb (86 kg)	Dec 10, 2017
Ladarrius Bishop; CB	Recruit ratings: Scout: Rivals: 247Sports: ESPN:				
Silas Robinson; OG	Yoakum, Texas	Yoakum High School	6 ft 4 in (1.93 m)	300 lb (140 kg)	Dec 10, 2017
Silas Robinson; OG	Recruit ratings: Scout: Rivals: 247Sports: ESPN:				
Billy Ferrell; DT	Fordyce, Arkansas	Fordyce High School	6 ft 3 in (1.91 m)	331 lb (150 kg)	Dec 17, 2017
Billy Ferrell; DT	Recruit ratings: Scout: Rivals: 247Sports: ESPN:				
Nick Fulwider; DE	Tyrone, Georgia	Sandy Creek High School	6 ft 7 in (2.01 m)	250 lb (110 kg)	Dec 21, 2017
Nick Fulwider; DE	Recruit ratings: Scout: Rivals: 247Sports: ESPN:				
Courtre Alexander; DE	Owasso, Oklahoma	Owasso High School	6 ft 4 in (1.93 m)	260 lb (120 kg)	Jan 21, 2018
Courtre Alexander; DE	Recruit ratings: Scout: Rivals: 247Sports: ESPN:				
Andrew Parker; LB	New Orleans, Louisiana	Sophie B. Wright Charter School	6 ft 2 in (1.88 m)	225 lb (102 kg)	Jan 21, 2018
Andrew Parker; LB	Recruit ratings: Scout: Rivals: 247Sports: ESPN:				
Rakeem Boyd; RB	Houston, Texas	Independence Community College	5 ft 11 in (1.80 m)	200 lb (91 kg)	Jan 22, 2018
Rakeem Boyd; RB	Recruit ratings: Scout: Rivals: 247Sports: ESPN:				
Myles Mason; S	Trussville, Alabama	Hewitt-Trussville High School	6 ft 2 in (1.88 m)	205 lb (93 kg)	Jan 22, 2018
Myles Mason; S	Recruit ratings: Scout: Rivals: 247Sports: ESPN:				
Ryan Winkel; OT	Memphis, Tennessee	Christian Brothers High School	6 ft 6 in (1.98 m)	286 lb (130 kg)	Jan 29, 2018
Ryan Winkel; OT	Recruit ratings: Scout: Rivals: 247Sports: ESPN:				
John Stephen Jones; QB	Dallas, Texas	Highland Park High School	5 ft 11 in (1.80 m)	175 lb (79 kg)	Feb 4, 2018
John Stephen Jones; QB	Recruit ratings: Scout: Rivals: 247Sports: ESPN:				
Joseph Foucha; S	New Orleans, Louisiana	McDonogh 35 High School	5 ft 11 in (1.80 m)	195 lb (88 kg)	Feb 7, 2018
Joseph Foucha; S	Recruit ratings: Scout: Rivals: 247Sports: ESPN:				
Dorian Gerald; DE	Florence, South Carolina	College of the Canyons	6 ft 3 in (1.91 m)	260 lb (120 kg)	Feb 9, 2018
Dorian Gerald; DE	Recruit ratings: Scout: Rivals: 247Sports: ESPN:				
Overall recruit ranking:
Note: In many cases, Scout, Rivals, 247Sports, On3, and ESPN may conflict in their listings of height and weight.; In these cases, the average was taken. ESPN grades are on a 100-point scale.; Sources: "Arkansas Football Commitments". Rivals.; "2018 Team Ranking". Rivals.com.

== Statistics ==
=== Scores by quarter ===
	1	2	3	4	Total
Arkansas	17	54	34	17	122
Non-conference opponents	20	29	18	31	98

	1	2	3	4	Total
Arkansas	31	37	21	49	138
SEC opponents	72	98	65	82	317

	1	2	3	4	Total
Arkansas	48	91	55	66	260
All opponents	92	129	83	113	417

== Players drafted into the NFL ==
Round	Pick	Player	Position	NFL club
4	118	Hjalte Froholdt	G	New England Patriots
5	148	Dre Greenlaw	LB	San Francisco 49ers
6	190	Armon Watts	DT	Minnesota Vikings
