= Lovejoy Independent School District =

School district in Texas, United States

- The administration building of Lovejoy ISD, located next to the former Lovejoy Elementary School. This building is commonly referred to as the 'Red Building'

Address
- 259 Country Club Road Allen, (Collin County), Texas, 75002; United States

District information
- Type: Public School District
- Grades: Pre-K – 12th grade
- Established: July 2nd, 1917
- Superintendent: Katie Kordel
- Governing agency: Texas Education Agency

Students and staff
- Colors: Red & Black

Other information
- Website: www.lovejoyisd.net

Lovejoy Independent School District (ISD) is a public school district in central Collin County, Texas, United States. The district's administration building is located at 259 Country Club Road in Allen.

Located 25 miles (40 km) north of Dallas, the district covers an approximately 16.7-square-mile (43 km^{2}) area in central Collin County. It serves around 4,100 students, and includes the following: most of Lucas and Fairview, much of Seis Lagos, and small portions of Allen and McKinney. Lovejoy ISD is bordered by Plano ISD to the south; Allen ISD to the west and southwest; McKinney ISD to the northwest, north and northeast; Princeton ISD to the east and Wylie ISD to the southeast.

The district was founded on July 2, 1917, forming the Lovejoy Common School District, Number 32, from the consolidation of the Forest Grove and Lick Springs schools; its name is taken from Mrs. J.L. Lovejoy, a local resident who was a strong proponent of educational causes. Early Collin County teacher, Claude Cecil Martin, was instrumental in persuading the community to consolidate the two schools. He taught at both the Forest Grove school and the Lick Springs schools.

In 2009, the school district was rated "exemplary" by the Texas Education Agency.

== Schools ==
- Grades 9-12
  - Lovejoy High School (Lucas)
- Grades 7-8
  - Willow Springs Middle School (Lucas)
- Grades 5-6
  - Sloan Creek Intermediate School (Fairview)
- Grades K-4
  - Hart Elementary School (Lucas)
  - Puster Elementary School (Fairview)
- Grades 18 Months - K
  - Carrie L. Lovejoy Child Development Center(Allen)

== History ==
In 2000, Lovejoy ISD opened its second elementary school, Joe V. Hart Elementary.

Until fall 2006, the district operated as a K-6 program; all middle and high school (grades 7 through 12) students attended the neighboring Allen ISD. After initial proposals to merge with Allen ISD were met with opposition by local residents, the district called a bond election to build a new middle school and high school with the goal of becoming a full K-12 district; the proposal was approved by voters.

Lovejoy High School opened in August 2006, with Dr. Michael Goddard serving as the high school's principal and Gavan Goodrich serving as the middle school's principal. The high school housed more than 800 students in grades 6 through 9 until Lovejoy Middle School, eventually renamed Sloan Creek Middle School, was opened later.

As of the 2013-2014 school year, Lovejoy ISD serves students in grades K-12. Students in grades K-4 attend one of the three elementary schools - Lovejoy Elementary, Hart Elementary, and the newest elementary, Puster Elementary, which opened in August 2008. Students in grades 5-6 attend Sloan Creek Intermediate School, which was originally Sloan Creek Middle School. Students in grades 7-8 attend Willow Springs Middle School (the first school year for Willows Springs Middle School was the 2013-2014 school year.) Students in grades 9 through 12 attend Lovejoy High School.

The transition plan for Lovejoy ISD was to add a grade level each year until 2009-2010, when the district would begin serving children in grades K through 12. The class of 2010 was the first high school graduating class in the history of Lovejoy Independent School District.

Circa 2014 residents of the Stonegate neighborhood in Lucas made a petition to be rezoned from McKinney ISD into Lovejoy ISD, but both districts refused the request. A similar request by the neighborhood was once again denied by the Collin County Commissioners Court in a June 2022 meeting.

In 2021, Lovejoy ISD closed Lovejoy Elementary School due to budget shortfalls. It was renamed to Lovejoy Child Development Center and is now used for Prekindergarten education and after-school child care.

== Notable alumni ==
- Matt Barr (actor)
- Bumper Pool
- Aidan Smith
- Aaron Fuller
