= Lovejoy High School (Lucas, Texas) =

Public school in Texas, United States

Location
- 2350 Estates Parkway; Lucas, Collin County, Texas 75002; United States; 33.100253°N 96.613077°W

Information
- School type: Public high school
- Established: 2006
- School district: Lovejoy Independent School District
- Principal: Justin Wieller
- Teaching staff: 102.18 (FTE)
- Grades: 9–12
- Enrollment: 1,596 (2023-2024)
- Student to teacher ratio: 15.62
- Colors: Red & Black
- Athletics conference: UIL, AAAAA
- Mascot: Leopard
- Website: lhs.lovejoyisd.net

Lovejoy High School is a public high school in Lucas, Texas, in south-central Collin County. It is the only high school in the Lovejoy Independent School District and is classified as 5A by the University Interscholastic League (UIL). The school serves most of the cities of Lucas and Fairview, as well as a small portion of Allen. Students from outside the district may transfer to Lovejoy High School for a tuition fee. Until the Fall of 2006, all high school students zoned in Lovejoy ISD attended nearby Allen High School. Lovejoy graduated its first senior class in 2010. In 2022, the school was given an Accountability Rating Summary of 98 by the Texas Education Agency, including Distinction Designations in all seven categories.

== Academics ==
As of 2024, the AP Participation Rate at Lovejoy High School was 81%.

== Extracurricular Activities ==
=== Athletics ===
The Lovejoy Leopards compete in the following sports -

Cross Country, Team Tennis, Volleyball, Football, Swimming & Diving, Wrestling, Girls Basketball, Boys Basketball, Soccer, Golf, Track & Field, Baseball, Softball, Boys Lacrosse, and Ice Hockey.

=== Fine Arts ===
The Lovejoy High School Band competes as a class 5A marching and concert band. In 2022, they placed 7th at the Bands of America Regional Marching Contest in Waco, Texas.

=== Lone Star Cup ===
Lovejoy High School won the Texas UIL Lone Star Cup for the 3A classification in 2010 and 2011, and the 5A classification in 2024.

=== State Titles ===
- Academic
  - 2019(5A)
- Baseball
  - 2026(5A/D2)
- Boys Cross Country
  - 2010(3A), 2016(5A), 2017(5A), 2023(5A), 2024(5A)
- Girls Cross Country
  - 2010(3A), 2011(3A), 2021(5A), 2022(5A), 2023(5A), 2025(5A)
- Cross-Examination Debate
  - 2019(5A), 2024(5A)
- Lincoln-Douglas Debate
  - 2019(5A)
- Ice Hockey
  - 2019-2020 - Junior Varsity Bronze division undefeated state champions
- RECF-VEX Robotics (Note: Due to the 2v2 nature of VEX Robotics matches, there are always two robotics teams awarded the State Champion title, and therefore there could be either one or two high schools holding the VEX Robotics State Championship Title at any given time.)
  - 2024(5A), (Note: Shared State Champion Title with Greenville High School (see Note 1).) 2025(5A) (Note: Solo State Champion; both of the teams that won the State Champion Title were from Lovejoy High School (see Note 1). One of those teams (1082R) was also the team that won the shared State Champion Title for Lovejoy the previous year.)
- Swimming
  - 2018
- Volleyball
  - 2008(3A), 2009(3A), 2010(3A), 2011(3A), 2012(4A), 2014(5A), 2019(5A), 2020(5A), 2021(5A), 2023(5A)
- Boys Wrestling
  - 2022(5A)
    - Team state champion
    - 220 lbs. weight class
    - 285 lbs. weight class
  - 2023(5A)
    - 285 lbs. weight class

== Notable alumni ==
- Gavin Casalegno, actor, attended freshman year.
- Aaron Fuller, NFL wide receiver
- Parker Livingstone, college football wide receiver for the Oklahoma Sooners
- Brooklyn and Bailey McKnight, YouTubers and social media personalities
- Payton Pierce, college football linebacker for the Ohio State Buckeyes
- Bumper Pool, UFL linebacker
- Aidan Smith, professional baseball player
- Tyler Loop, NFL placekicker for the Baltimore Ravens
