= Tyler Loop =

American football player (born 2001)

No. 33 – Baltimore Ravens
- Position: Placekicker
- Roster status: Injured reserve

Personal information
- Born: August 4, 2001 (age 25); Lucas, Texas, U.S.
- Listed height: 5 ft 11 in (1.80 m)
- Listed weight: 191 lb (87 kg)

Career information
- High school: Lovejoy (Lucas)
- College: Arizona (2020–2024)
- NFL draft: 2025: 6th round, 186th overall pick

Career history
- Baltimore Ravens (2025–present)

Awards and highlights
- Second-team All-Pac-12 (2023)

Career NFL statistics as of Week 8, 2026
- Field goals made: 43
- Field goals attempted: 51
- Field goal %: 84.3%
- Extra points made: 62
- Extra points attempted: 64
- Extra point %: 96.9%
- Points: 191
- Longest field goal: 64
- Touchbacks: 20
- Stats at Pro Football Reference

Steven Tyler Loop (born August 4, 2001) is an American professional football placekicker for the Baltimore Ravens of the National Football League (NFL). He played college football for the Arizona Wildcats and was selected by the Ravens in the sixth round of the 2025 NFL draft.

== Early life ==
Loop attended Lovejoy High School in Lucas, Texas. He was rated as a two-star recruit and committed to play college football for the Arizona Wildcats.

== College career ==
In the 2020 season, Loop served as the Wildcats punter where he punted 24 times for 1,033 yards with an average of 43.0 yards per punt. He transitioned to be Arizona's kicker in 2021, where he was perfect on all his kicks converting on all 12 of his field goal attempts and all 12 of his extra points. During the 2022 season, Loop went 18 for 21 on field goals, while being perfect on all 38 extra points. In the 2023 Alamo Bowl, he made all three of his field goals and all three of his extra points in a win over Oklahoma. During the 2023 season, he converted on 19 of his 24 field goals, while also hitting all 53 of his extra points. In the 2024 season opener, Loop made both of his field goals in a 61-39 win over New Mexico. In week 5, he made three of four field goal attempts and both his extra points in a win over Utah, and was named the Lou Groza Star of the Week. In week 6, Loop made five of his six field goal attempts versus Texas Tech, earning Big 12 Conference Special Teams Player of the Week honors. In week 11, he made a program record 62-yard field goal. For his performance during the 2024 season, Loop was named a semifinalist for the Lou Groza Award.

== Professional career ==
Pre-draft measurables
Height	Weight	Arm length	Hand span	Wingspan
5 ft 11 3/8 in (1.81 m)	191 lb (87 kg)	28 3/8 in (0.72 m)	8 5/8 in (0.22 m)	5 ft 10 3/4 in (1.80 m)
All values from NFL Combine

=== Baltimore Ravens ===
==== 2025 season ====
Loop was drafted by the Baltimore Ravens in the sixth round (186th overall) in the 2025 NFL draft. On August 16, 2025, after making five of six field goals in the 31–13 preseason victory over the Dallas Cowboys, Loop was officially designated as the Ravens' new placekicker to replace veteran Justin Tucker, who had been released during the offseason.

During the regular-season finale against the Pittsburgh Steelers, Loop missed a game-winning 44-yard field goal wide right that would have sent the Ravens to the playoffs, securing a narrow 26–24 road loss. Loop explained that he mishit the ball, hitting it too low on his foot.

As a rookie, Loop made 30-of-34 field goals and 44-of-46 extra points.

==== 2026 season ====
During the season-opening 41–23 road victory over the Indianapolis Colts, Loop made both of his field goals and all five of his extra points. Two weeks later against the Cowboys in Rio de Janeiro, Loop made all four of his extra points as well as both of his field goals, including a 56-yarder with one second left to secure the 34–31 victory. Loop was named AFC Special Teams Player of the Week for his performance. Later against the Titans at home, on October 4th, 2026, Tyler Loop made a 64 yard field goal, which is his longest field goal to date.

On November 3, 2026, Loop was placed on injured reserve with a groin injury.

== NFL career statistics ==
Legend
**Bold**	Career high

=== Regular season ===
General			Field goals					PATs			Kickoffs			Points
Season	Team	GP	FGM	FGA	FG%	Blck	Long	XPM	XPA	XP%	KO	Avg	TBs	Pts
2025	BAL	**17**	**30**	**34**	**88.2**	0	52	**44**	**46**	95.7	**94**	57.0	**10**	**134**
2026	BAL	8	13	17	76.5	**1**	**64**	18	18	**100.0**	37	**62.0**	9	57
Career		25	43	51	84.3	1	64	62	64	96.9	131	58.0	19	191

=== Awards and honors ===
- AFC Special teams player of the week (2026 week 3)
