= Payton Pierce =

American football player (born 2004)

No. 26 – Ohio State Buckeyes
- Position: Linebacker
- Class: Junior

Personal information
- Born: December 12, 2004 (age 21)
- Listed height: 6 ft 2 in (1.88 m)
- Listed weight: 223 lb (101 kg)

Career information
- High school: Lovejoy (Lucas, Texas)
- College: Ohio State (2024–present)
- Stats at ESPN

Payton Pierce (born December 12, 2004) is an American college football linebacker for the Ohio State Buckeyes.

== Early life ==
Pierce is from Lucas, Texas. He grew up competing in wrestling and football, starting the latter in third grade. He first attended Allen High School before transferring to Lovejoy High School in Lucas. He competed in both wrestling and football in high school and compiled a record of 30–1 as a wrestler, winning the 2022 5A state championship while competing in the 220 pounds (100 kg) weight class.

Playing for Lovejoy's football team in 2021, Pierce posted 131 tackles, six sacks and five forced fumbles. He missed much of the 2022 season due to injury. In his senior year, 2023, he tallied 181 tackles, 40 tackles-for-loss (TFLs), eight sacks and four forced fumbles, being named the 7-5A Division II MVP and the 2023 All-Area Defensive Player of the Year by the Allen American. Pierce was a finalist for the Butkus Award as the best high school linebacker nationally and was invited to the All-American Bowl. He was ranked a four-star recruit, one of the top-15 linebackers nationally and a top-200 player overall in the 2024 recruiting class. Pierce committed to play college football for the Ohio State Buckeyes.

== College career ==
As a true freshman in 2024, Pierce recorded four tackles in 14 games for the national champion Buckeyes. He saw more significant playing time during the 2025 season, recording 43 tackles, an interception and a forced fumble.
