= Froholdt =

Froholdt is a Danish surname. Notable people with the surname include:

- Hjalte Froholdt (born 1996), Danish gridiron football center
- Victor Froholdt (born 2006), Danish association football midfielder
