= Seis Lagos, Texas =

- Census-designated place
- Location within Texas Location within the United States
- Coordinates: 33°04′16″N 96°33′59″W
- Country: United States
- State: Texas
- County: Collin

Area
  - Total: 0.80 sq mi (2.08 km^{2})
  - Land: 0.76 sq mi (1.96 km^{2})
  - Water: 0.042 sq mi (0.11 km^{2})
- Elevation: 561 ft (171 m)
- Time zone: UTC-6 (Central (CST))
  - Summer (DST): UTC-5 (CDT)
- ZIP Code: 75098 (Wylie)
- Area codes: 214, 469, 972, 945
- FIPS code: 48-66686
- GNIS feature ID: 2805759

Seis Lagos is a gated community and census-designated place (CDP) in Collin County, Texas, United States. It was first listed as a CDP prior to the 2020 census. As of the 2020 census, Seis Lagos had a population of 1,450, but a sharp decline followed one year later, leaving the community with 1,122.

The Seis Lagos Community is located in Lucas, Texas, but outside the city municipality, in the extraterritorial jurisdiction. The State designates certain areas as the extraterritorial jurisdiction of municipalities to promote and protect the general health, safety, and welfare of persons residing in and adjacent to the municipalities.

It is in the southern part of the county, bordered to the north, west, and south by the city limits of Lucas. It is 29 miles (47 km) northeast of the center of Dallas. As suggested by the name, six lakes have been built into the rolling terrain of the community.

== History ==
The name of the community is Spanish for "Six Lakes", revealing its proximity to numerous water bodies, which, to the present day remain an important part of community life.

Seis Lagos was developed by Joe Duncan, the original owner of Southfork Ranch. He built his family home in 1970, which, along with his ranch, were featured in the 1970s and 1980s television show Dallas. Seis Lagos was developed by Joe Duncan with Duncan Developments.

Earnest home constructions, however, did not begin until the 1990s. The first phase of construction erected 199 homes and was completed in the mid-1990s. The second phase added 57 homes in 2001. Phase III of the same year added 71 homesites on 55 acres in the southeastern regions of the community territory. The final phase plans to add about 70 homes to the south.

== Demographics ==
Historical population
Census	Pop.	Note	%±
2020	1,450		—
U.S. Decennial Census; 1850–1900 1910; 1920 1930 1940; 1950 1960 1970; 1980 1990 2000; 2010 2020

Seis Lagos first appeared as a census designated place in the 2020 U.S. census.

=== 2020 census ===
Seis Lagos CDP, Texas – Racial and ethnic composition Note: the US Census treats Hispanic/Latino as an ethnic category. This table excludes Latinos from the racial categories and assigns them to a separate category. Hispanics/Latinos may be of any race.
Race / Ethnicity (NH = Non-Hispanic)	Pop 2020	% 2020
White alone (NH)	1,124	77.52%
Black or African American alone (NH)	31	2.14%
Native American or Alaska Native alone (NH)	12	0.83%
Asian alone (NH)	76	5.24%
Native Hawaiian or Pacific Islander alone (NH)	1	0.07%
Other race alone (NH)	4	0.28%
Mixed race or Multiracial (NH)	88	6.07%
Hispanic or Latino (any race)	114	7.86%
Total	1,450	100.00%

== Education ==
Part of Seis Lagos is in Wylie Independent School District. Another part of it is in Lovejoy Independent School District.

The Texas Education Code specifies that all of the county is in the service area of Collin College.
