= Dre Greenlaw =

American football player (born 1997)

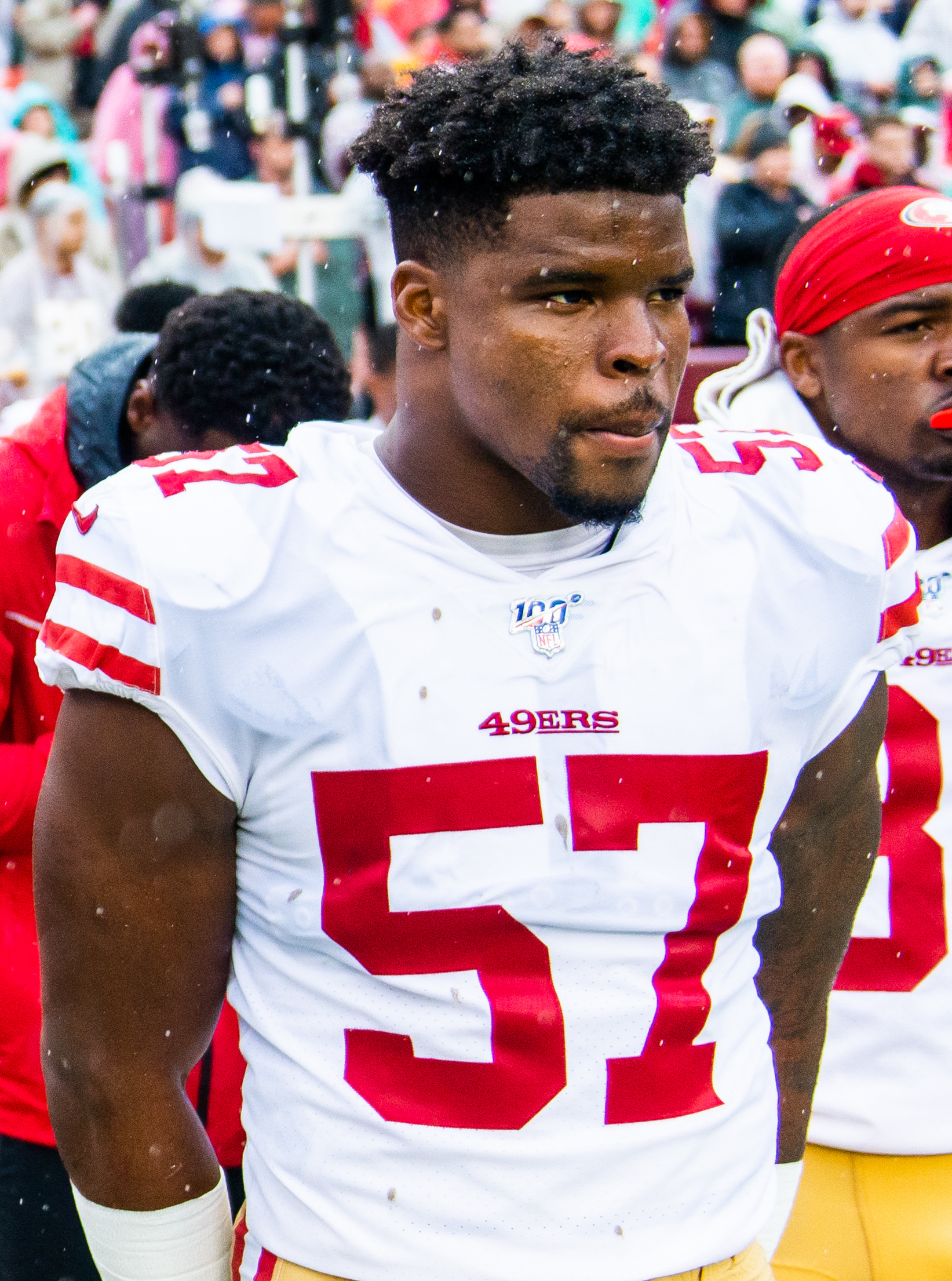
- Greenlaw with the San Francisco 49ers in 2019

No. 57 – San Francisco 49ers
- Position: Linebacker
- Roster status: Active

Personal information
- Born: May 25, 1997 (age 29); Conway, Arkansas, U.S.
- Listed height: 6 ft 0 in (1.83 m)
- Listed weight: 230 lb (104 kg)

Career information
- High school: Fayetteville (Fayetteville, Arkansas)
- College: Arkansas (2015–2018)
- NFL draft: 2019: 5th round, 148th overall pick

Career history
- San Francisco 49ers (2019–2024); Denver Broncos (2025); San Francisco 49ers (2026–present)

Awards and highlights
- PFWA All-Rookie Team (2019)

Career NFL statistics as of Week 10, 2026
- Total tackles: 563
- Sacks: 5.0
- Forced fumbles: 4
- Fumble recoveries: 2
- Pass deflections: 16
- Interceptions: 4
- Defensive touchdowns: 2
- Stats at Pro Football Reference

Ke'Aundre J'Quan Greenlaw (born May 25, 1997) is an American professional football linebacker for the San Francisco 49ers of the National Football League (NFL). He played college football for the Arkansas Razorbacks and was selected by the 49ers in the fifth round of the 2019 NFL draft. Greenlaw has also played for the Denver Broncos.

== Early life ==
Greenlaw grew up in group homes and shelters in Arkansas from the age of eight. At age 14, he met Brian Early, the defensive coach for Fayetteville High School. The Early family invited Greenlaw to live with them and he was formally adopted by them at age 21.

Greenlaw attended Fayetteville Public Schools, playing for a Fayetteville High School football team that won the Class 7A 2011 state championship. He was named to the Arkansas Democrat-Gazette preseason "Super Sophomore" team in 2012. Greenlaw started at cornerback, recording 53 total tackles, two forced fumbles, five pass deflections, and an interception on a team that repeated as 7A state champions. As a junior, he moved to strong safety. Greenlaw was considered a three-star recruit by Rivals.com.

College recruiting
Name	Hometown	School	Height	Weight	Commit date
Dre Greenlaw; OLB/S	Conway, Arkansas	Fayetteville High School	6 ft 0 in (1.83 m)	227 lb (103 kg)	Oct 23, 2014
Dre Greenlaw; OLB/S	Recruit ratings: Rivals: 247Sports: (72)				
Overall recruit ranking:
Note: In many cases, Scout, Rivals, 247Sports, On3, and ESPN may conflict in their listings of height and weight.; In these cases, the average was taken. ESPN grades are on a 100-point scale.; Sources: "2015 Team Ranking". Rivals.com.

== College career ==
Greenlaw played college football under head coaches Bret Bielema and Chad Morris at the University of Arkansas. He recorded 320 total tackles, four sacks, three interceptions, and three forced fumbles from 2015 to 2018.

=== Collegiate statistics ===
Season	Team	GP	Tackles				Interceptions					Fumbles	
Season	Team	GP	Cmb	Solo	Ast	Sck	Int	Yds	Avg	Lng	TD	FF	FR
2015	Arkansas	13	95	46	49	1.0	0	0	0.0	0	0	2	0
2016	Arkansas	7	42	22	20	0.0	1	3	3.0	3	0	0	2
2017	Arkansas	12	103	52	51	1.0	0	0	0.0	0	0	0	0
2018	Arkansas	9	80	38	42	2.0	2	5	2.5	5	0	1	1
Career		41	320	158	162	4.0	3	8	2.7	5	0	3	3

== Professional career ==
Pre-draft measurables
Height	Weight	Arm length	Hand span	Wingspan	40-yard dash	10-yard split	20-yard split	20-yard shuttle	Three-cone drill	Vertical jump	Broad jump	Bench press
5 ft 11 1/2 in (1.82 m)	237 lb (108 kg)	32 1/4 in (0.82 m)	9 7/8 in (0.25 m)	6 ft 5 1/2 in (1.97 m)	4.73 s	1.65 s	2.68 s	4.56 s	7.21 s	33.0 in (0.84 m)	9 ft 9 in (2.97 m)	24 reps
All values from NFL Combine/Pro Day

=== San Francisco 49ers (first stint) ===
==== 2019 season ====
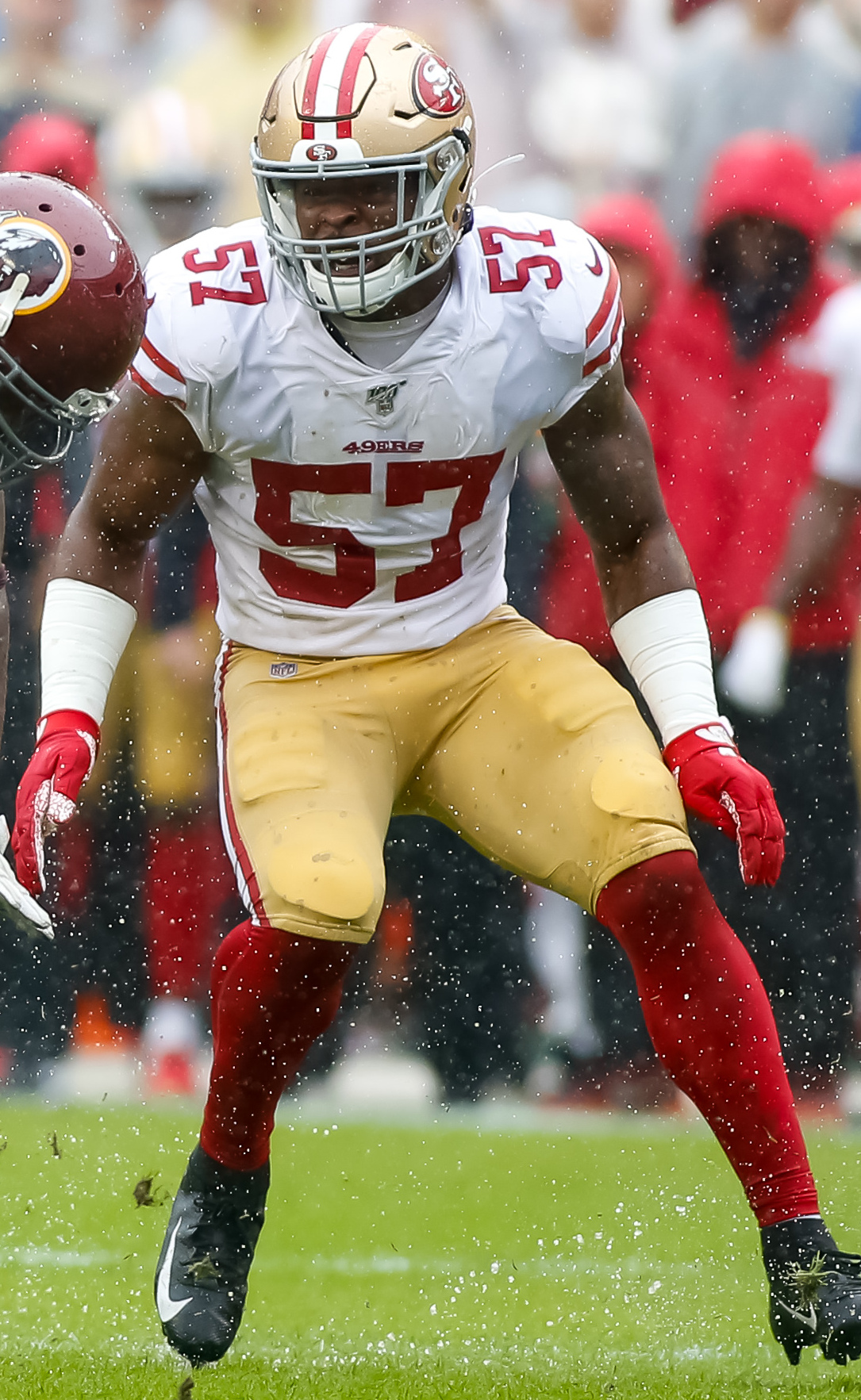
Greenlaw in 2019

Greenlaw was drafted by the San Francisco 49ers in the fifth round (148th overall) of the 2019 NFL draft. He was drafted after the 49ers traded linebacker Dekoda Watson to acquire the 148th pick.

Greenlaw made his NFL debut in the season-opener against the Tampa Bay Buccaneers and finished the 31–17 road victory with four combined tackles (three solo). During a Week 9 28–25 road victory over the Arizona Cardinals on Thursday Night Football, he had four solo tackles and his first NFL sack on Kyler Murray. In the next game against the Seattle Seahawks on Monday Night Football, Greenlaw recorded eight combined tackles (three solo), a pass deflection, and his first NFL interception off of Russell Wilson during the 27–24 overtime loss. The following week against the Cardinals, Greenlaw had 10 combined tackles (eight solo) in the 36–26 victory.

During a narrow Week 14 48–46 road victory over the New Orleans Saints, Greenlaw recorded seven combined tackles (six solo) and a pass deflection. Two weeks later Los Angeles Rams, he had a team-high 13 combined tackles (nine solo) in the 34–31 victory. In the regular-season finale against the Seahawks on Sunday Night Football, Greenlaw once again recorded a team-high 13 combined tackles (11 solo) and made a critical stop on tight end Jacob Hollister inside of the one-yard line on the final play of the drive, sealing the 26–21 road victory and securing the #1-seed for the 49ers in the playoffs. Greenlaw credited review from the 49ers' Week 15 29–22 loss to the Atlanta Falcons, which ended in a similar scenario where wide receiver Julio Jones was barely able to break the plane into the endzone, for giving him the correct technique to hit Hollister high.

Greenlaw finished his rookie year with 92 combined tackles (64 solo), two pass deflections, a sack, and an interception in 16 games and 11 starts. He was named to the PFWA NFL All-Rookie Team. The 49ers finished atop the NFC West with a 13–3 record and qualified for the playoffs. In the Divisional Round against the Minnesota Vikings, Greenlaw had four combined tackles (three solo) and a forced fumble during the 27–10 victory. During the NFC Championship Game against the Green Bay Packers, he recorded six combined tackles (five solo) in the 37–20 victory as the 49ers advanced to Super Bowl LIV. In the Super Bowl against the Kansas City Chiefs, Greenlaw had four combined tackles (two solo) during the 31–20 loss.

==== 2020 season ====
During the season-opener against the Cardinals, Greenlaw had five combined tackles (three solo) and a pass deflection in the 24–20 loss. During a Week 6 24–16 victory over the Rams on Sunday Night Football, he recorded a team-high eight solo tackles. In the next game against the New England Patriots, Greenlaw had six combined tackles (three solo) and his first sack of the season on Cam Newton during the 33–6 road victory.

During a Week 10 27–13 road loss to the Saints, Greenlaw recorded a team-high 11 combined tackles (seven solo). During Week 14 against the Washington Football Team, he had a team-high seven combined tackles (six solo) in the 23–15 loss.

Greenlaw finished his second professional season with 86 combined tackles (61 solo), a pass deflection, and a sack in 13 games and 11 starts.

==== 2021 season ====
During the season-opening 41–33 road victory over the Detroit Lions, Greenlaw recorded six combined tackles (four solo), a pass deflection, and his first NFL touchdown on a pick-six off of Jared Goff. However, on September 18, 2021, Greenlaw was placed on injured reserve after undergoing groin surgery. He was activated on November 27. In the regular-season finale against the Rams, Greenlaw had a team-high 12 combined tackles (five solo) during the 27–24 overtime road victory.

Greenlaw finished the 2021 season with 21 combined tackles (10 solo), a pass deflection, and a pick-six in three games and two starts. The 49ers finished third in the NFC West with a 10–7 record and qualified for the playoffs as the #6-seed. During the Wild Card Round against the Dallas Cowboys, Greenlaw had five combined tackles (three solo) in the 23–17 road victory. In the Divisional Round against the Packers, he recorded six combined tackles (three solo) and a fumble recovery during the 13–10 road victory. During the NFC Championship Game against the Rams, Greenlaw had three combined tackles (two solo) in the 20–17 road loss.

==== 2022 season ====
On September 18, 2022, Greenlaw recorded a team-high eight combined tackles (six solo) in a Week 2 27–7 victory over the Seahawks. The next day, he signed a two-year, $19 million extension with the 49ers.

During Week 3 against the Denver Broncos on Sunday Night Football, Greenlaw recorded a team-high 10 combined tackles (five solo) in the narrow 11–10 road loss. In the next game against the Rams on Monday Night Football, he had a team-high 15 combined tackles (12 solo) during the 24–9 victory. The following week against the Carolina Panthers, Greenlaw recorded a team-high 11 combined tackles (four solo) in the 37–15 road victory.

During a Week 10 22–16 victory over the Los Angeles Chargers on Sunday Night Football, Greenlaw had a team-high seven combined tackles (six solo) before being ejected for a helmet-to-helmet hit on Chargers quarterback Justin Herbert near the end of the second quarter. Greenlaw was later fined $10,609 for the hit. In the next game against the Cardinals at Estadio Azteca on Monday Night Football, Greenlaw recorded nine combined tackles (eight solo), a forced fumble, and a pass deflection during the 38–10 victory. The following week against the Saints, he had six combined tackles (five solo), a fumble recovery, and a pass deflection in the 13–0 shutout victory.

During Week 13 against the Miami Dolphins, Greenlaw recorded a team-high eight combined tackles (seven solo) and a pass deflection while also recovering a Tua Tagovailoa fumble forced by Nick Bosa and returning it for a 23-yard touchdown to secure a 33–17 victory for the 49ers. In the next game against the Buccaneers, Greenlaw tied his season-high of 15 combined tackles (10 solo) while also deflecting a pass and intercepting a pass off of Tom Brady during the 35–7 victory. The following week against the Seahawks on Thursday Night Football, Greenlaw had eight combined tackles (four solo), two pass deflections, and a forced fumble in the 21–13 road victory.

The 49ers finished atop the NFC West with a 13–4 record and qualified for the playoffs as the #2-seed. Greenlaw finished the 2022 season with a career-high 127 combined tackles (82 solo), six pass deflections, two forced fumbles, two fumble recoveries, an interception, and a touchdown in 15 games and starts. During the Wild Card Round against the Seahawks, Greenlaw had a team-high 11 combined tackles (eight solo) in the 41–23 victory. In the Divisional Round against the Cowboys, he recorded six combined tackles (four solo) and a pass deflection during the 19–12 victory. During the NFC Championship Game against the Philadelphia Eagles, Greenlaw had nine combined tackles (five solo) in the 31–7 road loss. He was ranked 79th by his fellow players on the NFL Top 100 Players of 2023.

==== 2023 season ====
During a Week 2 30–23 road victory over the Rams, Greenlaw recorded a team-high 11 combined tackles (tied with Fred Warner) and a pass deflection. Two weeks later against the Cardinals, he had a team-high 10 combined tackles (tied with Warner) in the 35–16 victory. In the next game against the Cowboys on Sunday Night Football, Greenlaw recorded five solo tackles, a pass deflection, and his first sack of the season on Dak Prescott during the 42–10 blowout victory. However, Greenlaw missed the following week's game against the Cleveland Browns after suffering a hamstring injury in practice earlier in the week. He returned in time for the Week 7 matchup against the Vikings on Monday Night Football and finished the 22–17 road loss with 10 combined tackles (eight solo).

Following a Week 9 bye, the 49ers went on the road to face the Jacksonville Jaguars. Greenlaw finished the 34–3 blowout victory with a team-high eight combined tackles (tied with Talanoa Hufanga). In the next game against the Buccaneers, he recorded eight combined tackles (four solo), two pass deflections, and 0.5 sacks during the 27–14 victory. The following week against the Seahawks on Thanksgiving, Greenlaw had a team-high eight combined tackles (five solo) in the 31–13 road victory.

During a Week 13 42–19 road victory over the Eagles, Greenlaw recorded a team-high seven combined tackles (tied with Ambry Thomas). Three weeks later against the Baltimore Ravens on Christmas Day, he had a team-high 12 combined tackles (two solo) in the 33–19 loss. In the next game against the Washington Commanders, Greenlaw recorded a team-high 10 combined tackles (six solo) during the 27–10 road victory.

Greenlaw finished the 2023 season with 120 combined tackles (75 solo), 1.5 sacks, and four pass deflections in 15 games and starts. The 49ers finished atop the NFC West with a 12–5 record and qualified for the playoffs as the #1-seed. In the Divisional Round against the Packers, Greenlaw recorded eight combined tackles (six solo), two pass deflections, and intercepted Jordan Love twice during the 24–21 victory. During the NFC Championship Game against the Lions, he had seven combined tackles (three solo) in the 34–31 comeback victory as the 49ers advanced to Super Bowl LVIII. In the Super Bowl against the Chiefs, Greenlaw had three tackles before leaving the eventual 25–22 overtime loss during the second quarter with a left leg injury after falling over while coming off the sideline. The next day, it was revealed that he tore his Achilles tendon. Prior to the tear, Greenlaw missed the regular season finale as his Achilles was beleaguered with an infection, but Greenlaw stated that he would still play through it on a part-time basis when the 49ers ventured through the playoffs. Greenlaw later had successful surgery on his torn Achilles.

==== 2024 season ====
Greenlaw began the 2024 season on the reserve/PUP list while recovering from his torn Achilles.

On December 12, 2024, Greenlaw was activated from the reserve/PUP list. He made his season debut that night against the Rams and finished the 12–6 loss with eight combined tackles (three solo).

On December 26, the 49ers announced that Greenlaw would be shut down for the rest of the season. He finished the 2024 season with nine tackles (three solo) in two games and starts.

=== Denver Broncos ===
On March 13, 2025, Greenlaw signed a three-year, $35 million contract with the Denver Broncos. On September 20, he was placed on short-term injured reserve due to a lingering quad injury sustained during training camp. Greenlaw was activated on October 18.

Greenlaw made his Broncos debut during the historic Week 7 33–32 comeback victory over the New York Giants, recording six combined tackles (one solo) and a hit on rookie quarterback Jaxson Dart. Following the victory, Greenlaw was suspended by the NFL for one game without pay for running at referee Brad Allen right after Broncos placekicker Wil Lutz had successfully made the game winning field goal.

Greenlaw returned from suspension in Week 9 against the Houston Texans and finished the 18–15 road victory with eight combined tackles (one solo) and his first sack of the season on C. J. Stroud. In the next game against the Las Vegas Raiders on Thursday Night Football, Greenlaw recorded five combined tackles (two solo), a forced fumble, and a pass deflection during the 10–7 victory. Three weeks later against the Commanders on Sunday Night Football, he had five combined tackles (two solo), an interception, and a pass deflection in the narrow 27–26 overtime road victory. Greenlaw missed the last two games of the regular season due to a hamstring injury.

Greenlaw finished the 2025 season with 43 combined tackles (15 solo), a sack, a forced fumble, an interception, and two pass deflections in eight games and seven starts. The Broncos finished atop the AFC West with a 14–3 record and qualified for the playoffs as the #1-seed. In the Divisional Round against the Buffalo Bills, Greenlaw had four tackles during the 33–30 overtime victory. During the AFC Championship Game against the Patriots, he recorded six tackles in the 10–7 loss.

On March 9, 2026, it was announced that Greenlaw would be released by the Broncos. Three days later, he was officially released with a post-June 1 designation.

=== San Francisco 49ers (second stint) ===
On March 13, 2026, Greenlaw signed a one-year, $7.5 million contract to return to the 49ers.

During Week 4 against his former team, the Broncos, Greenlaw recorded a team-high 12 combined tackles (seven solo) and a forced fumble in the 24–14 victory. In the next game against the Seahawks, Greenlaw made a late hit on Sam Darnold on the Seahawks' sideline during the second quarter of the 32–29 road victory, causing several Seahawks players to confront Greenlaw for the late hit. In the process, he was spotted headbutting Ernest Jones IV and was assessed an additional penalty following the late hit while also being disqualified. The next day, the NFL suspended Greenlaw for one game. He returned from suspension in Week 7 against the Falcons and tied his season-high of 12 combined tackles (four solo) in the 29–20 road loss.

Following a Week 8 bye, the 49ers returned home to face the Raiders. Greenlaw finished the 38–17 victory with a team-high eight combined tackles (five solo) and a fumble recovery. In the next game against the Cowboys, he had eight combined tackles (four solo) and 0.5 sacks during the 46–40 road victory.

== NFL career statistics ==
Legend
	Led the league
**Bold**	Career high

=== Regular season ===
Year	Team	Games		Tackles					Interceptions						Fumbles			
Year	Team	GP	GS	Cmb	Solo	Ast	Sck	TFL	PD	Int	Yds	Avg	Lng	TD	FF	FR	Yds	TD
2019	SF	**16**	11	92	64	28	1.0	3	2	**1**	**47**	**47.0**	**47**	0	0	0	0	0
2020	SF	13	11	86	61	25	1.0	**7**	1	0	0	0.0	0	0	0	0	0	0
2021	SF	3	2	21	10	11	0.0	0	1	**1**	39	39.0	39T	**1**	0	0	0	0
2022	SF	15	**15**	**127**	**82**	**45**	0.0	3	**6**	**1**	0	0.0	0	0	**2**	**2**	**23**	**1**
2023	SF	15	**15**	120	75	**45**	**1.5**	5	4	0	13	13.0	13	0	0	0	0	0
2024	SF	2	2	9	3	6	0.0	0	0	0	0	0.0	0	0	0	0	0	0
2025	DEN	8	7	43	15	28	1.0	2	2	**1**	27	27.0	27	0	1	0	0	0
2026	SF	8	8	65	31	34	0.5	3	0	0	0	0.0	0	0	1	1	0	0
Career		80	71	563	341	222	5.0	23	16	4	126	31.5	47	1	4	3	23	1

=== Postseason ===
Year	Team	Games		Tackles					Interceptions						Fumbles			
Year	Team	GP	GS	Cmb	Solo	Ast	Sck	TFL	PD	Int	Yds	Avg	Lng	TD	FF	FR	Yds	TD
2019	SF	**3**	**3**	14	10	4	0.0	0	0	0	0	0.0	0	0	**1**	0	0	0
2021	SF	**3**	**3**	14	8	6	0.0	1	0	0	0	0.0	0	0	0	**1**	0	0
2022	SF	**3**	**3**	**26**	**17**	9	0.0	**2**	1	0	0	0.0	0	0	0	0	0	0
2023	SF	**3**	**3**	18	9	9	0.0	1	**2**	**2**	**25**	12.5	18	0	0	0	0	0
2025	DEN	2	0	10	0	**10**	0.0	0	0	0	0	0.0	0	0	0	0	0	0
Career		14	12	82	44	38	0.0	4	3	2	25	12.5	18	0	1	1	0	0
