= Aaron Fuller (American football) =

American football player (born 1997)

Profile
- Position: Wide receiver

Personal information
- Born: September 30, 1997 (age 29); Lucas, Texas, U.S.
- Listed height: 5 ft 11 in (1.80 m)
- Listed weight: 188 lb (85 kg)

Career information
- High school: Lovejoy (Lucas, Texas)
- College: Washington (2016–2019)
- NFL draft: 2020: undrafted

Career history
- Seattle Seahawks (2020–2022)
- Stats at Pro Football Reference

Aaron Fuller (born September 30, 1997) is an American football wide receiver. He played college football at Washington.

== Early life ==
Fuller grew up in McKinney, Texas and attended Lovejoy High School in Lucas, Texas. As a junior, he was named the District 10-5A Offensive Player of the Year and All-Collin County after finishing the season with 69 receptions for 1,396 yards and 22 touchdowns. As a senior, Fuller caught 86 passes for 1,178 yards and 14 touchdowns with two rushing touchdowns and two punts returned for touchdowns and repeated as an All-Collin County selection. Fuller was rated a three-star recruit and committed to play college football at Washington over offers from SMU, Navy, Northwestern, Iowa, Boston College and Houston.

== College career ==
Fuller was a member of the Washington Huskies for four seasons. He led the Huskies with 58 receptions and 874 receiving yards with four touchdowns and returned 22 punts for 122 yards in his junior season. As a senior, Fuller caught 59 passes for 702 yards and six touchdowns and returned 22 punts for 250 yards and one touchdown. Fuller finished his collegiate career with 159 receptions for 2,051 yards and 13 touchdowns in 54 games played.

== Professional career ==
Pre-draft measurables
Height	Weight	Arm length	Hand span	Wingspan	40-yard dash	10-yard split	20-yard split	Three-cone drill	Vertical jump	Broad jump
5 ft 10 3/4 in (1.80 m)	188 lb (85 kg)	29 3/4 in (0.76 m)	8 7/8 in (0.23 m)	6 ft 1 1/4 in (1.86 m)	4.59 s	1.61 s	2.69 s	7.14 s	34.0 in (0.86 m)	9 ft 10 in (3.00 m)
All values from NFL Combine

Fuller signed with the Seattle Seahawks as an undrafted free agent on May 1, 2020. He was waived on September 5, 2020, and re-signed to the practice squad the next day. Fuller remained on the practice squad for the entirety of the 2020 season and signed a reserve/futures contract with the Seahawks on January 11, 2021. He was waived at the end of the preseason on August 31, 2021, and again resigned to the practice squad on September 1. Fuller was elevated to the active roster on January 8, 2022, for the Seahawks' final game of the season against the Arizona Cardinals, where he made his NFL debut in the 38–30 victory. He signed a reserve/future contract with the Seahawks on January 10, 2022.

On August 30, 2022, Fuller was waived by the Seahawks.
