= De'Jon Harris =

American football player (born 1997)

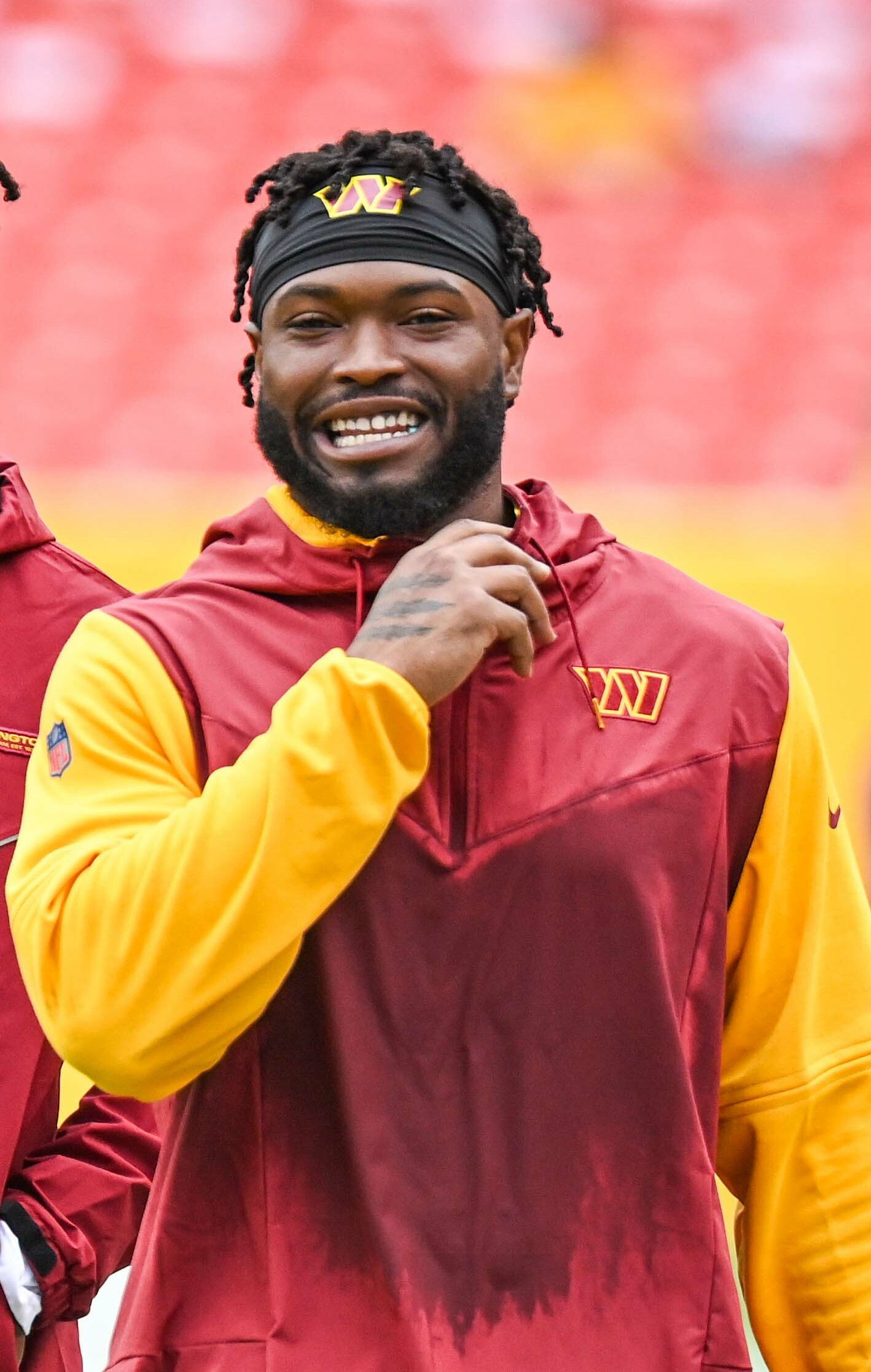
- Harris with the Washington Football Team in 2022

Profile
- Position: Linebacker

Personal information
- Born: November 1, 1997 (age 29); New Orleans, Louisiana, U.S.
- Listed height: 6 ft 0 in (1.83 m)
- Listed weight: 245 lb (111 kg)

Career information
- High school: John Ehret (Jefferson Parish, Louisiana)
- College: Arkansas
- NFL draft: 2020: undrafted

Career history
- New England Patriots (2020)*; Green Bay Packers (2020); Washington Football Team / Commanders (2021–2023)
- * Offseason or practice squad member only

Career NFL statistics as of Week 18, 2023
- Tackles: 5
- Sacks: 1
- Stats at Pro Football Reference

De'Jon Raiheem "Scoota" Harris (born November 1, 1997) is an American professional football linebacker. He played college football for the Arkansas Razorbacks. Harris has also been a member of the New England Patriots, Green Bay Packers, and Washington Commanders.

== College career ==
Harris played in 45 games for Arkansas from 2016 - 2019, recording 371 tackles, 26 tackles for loss, 7.5 sacks, 9 pass deflections, 4 forced fumbles, 3 fumble recoveries, and 1 defensive touchdown.

== Professional career ==
Pre-draft measurables
Height	Weight	Arm length	Hand span	40-yard dash	10-yard split	20-yard split	20-yard shuttle	Three-cone drill	Vertical jump	Broad jump	Bench press
5 ft 11 5/8 in (1.82 m)	234 lb (106 kg)	31 3/8 in (0.80 m)	9 3/8 in (0.24 m)	4.69 s	1.64 s	2.77 s	4.32 s	7.06 s	33.5 in (0.85 m)	9 ft 3 in (2.82 m)	18 reps

=== New England Patriots ===
Harris was signed by the New England Patriots as an undrafted free agent on April 26, 2020. He was waived on September 5, 2020.

=== Green Bay Packers ===
Harris was signed by the Green Bay Packers to their practice squad on September 9, 2020. He was elevated to the active roster on October 5 and November 28 for the team's weeks 4 and 12 games against the Atlanta Falcons and Chicago Bears, and reverted to the practice squad after each game. On January 25, 2021, Harris signed a reserve/futures contract with the Packers. On August 31, 2021, Packers released Harris as part of their final roster cuts.

=== Washington Football Team / Commanders ===
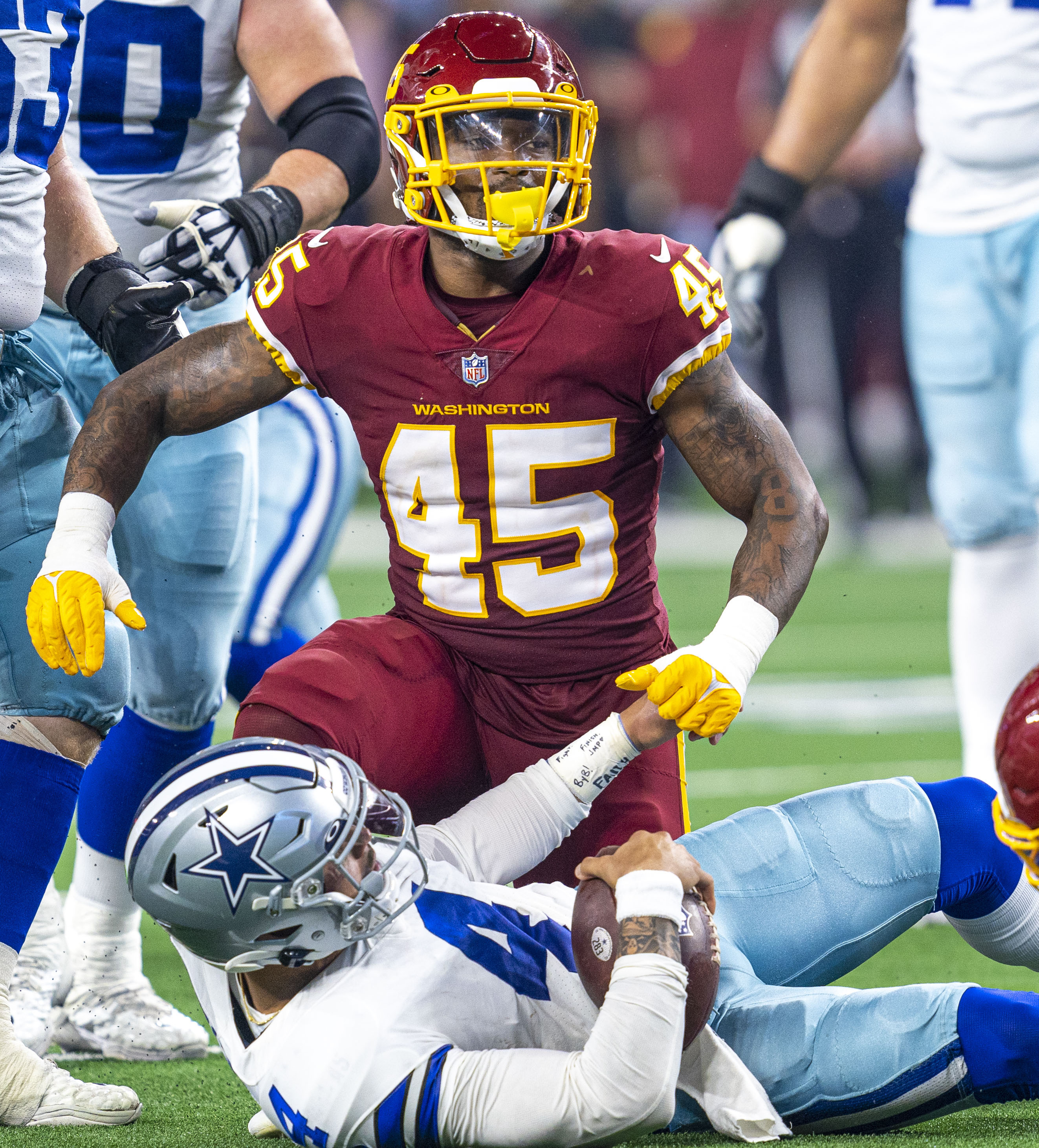
Harris playing against the Dallas Cowboys in 2021.

Harris signed with the Washington Football Team's practice squad on October 19, 2021. He was elevated to the active roster as a COVID-19 replacement player against the Philadelphia Eagles in Week 15. Harris was signed to the active roster on January 3, 2022.

Harris was released by the Commanders on August 31, 2022, and re-signed to the practice squad two days later. He was signed to the active roster on November 3. On December 22, he was waived then re-signed to the practice squad four days later and promoted again to the active roster on December 30. On January 4, 2023, Harris was placed on injured reserve.

On August 29, 2023, Harris was waived by the Commanders and re-signed to the practice squad. On October 10, he was signed to the active roster. On November 22, the Commanders placed him on injured reserve due to a quad injury. He was reactivated on December 28.

== Personal life ==
Harris' nickname Scoota was given to him by his mother at birth.
