= Fairview, Texas =

- Town
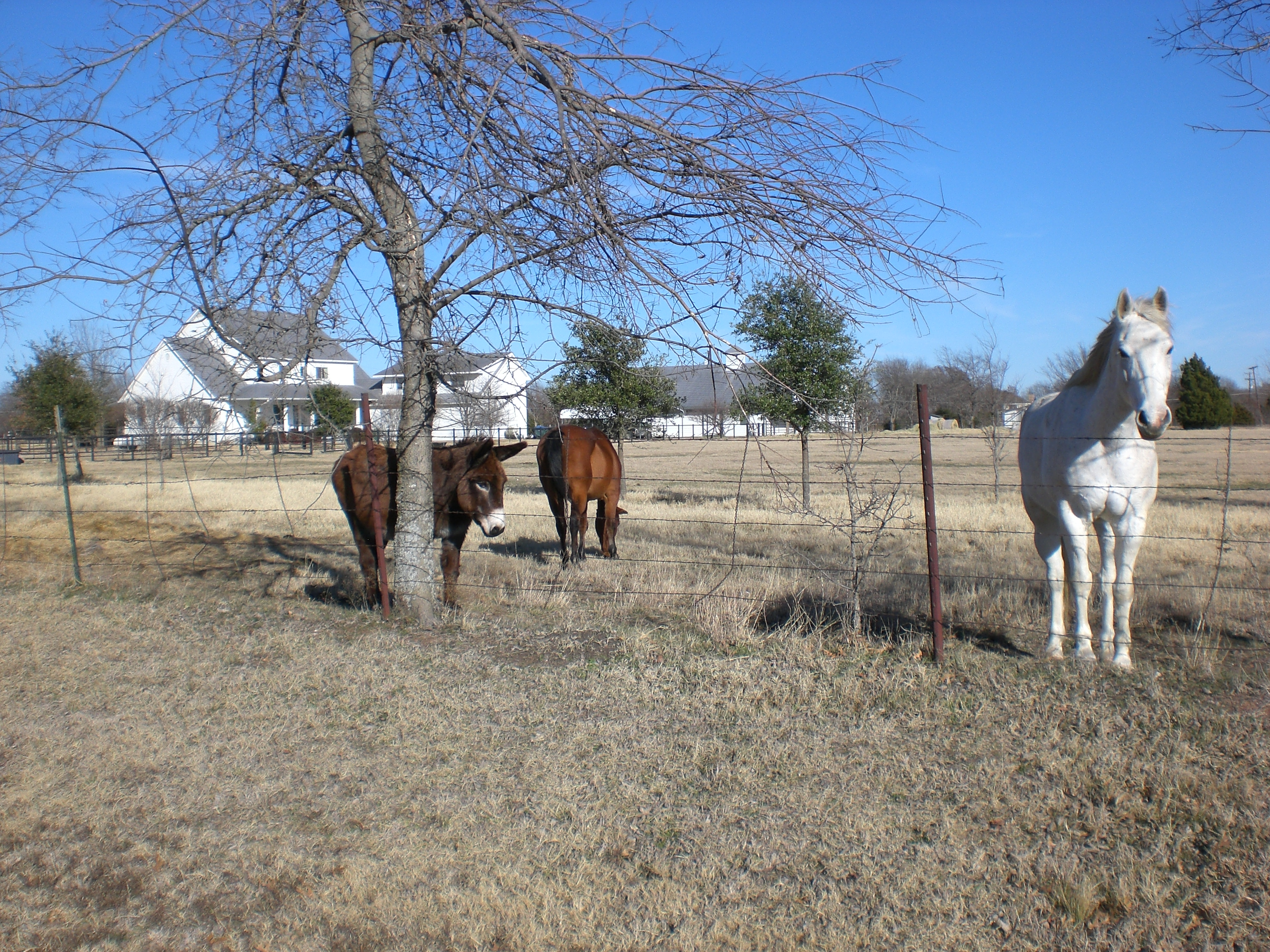
- Motto: "Keeping It Country"
- Location of Fairview in Collin County, Texas
- Coordinates: 33°8′54″N 96°37′11″W
- Country: United States
- State: Texas
- County: Collin

Area
  - Total: 8.89 sq mi (23.02 km^{2})
  - Land: 8.87 sq mi (22.98 km^{2})
  - Water: 0.015 sq mi (0.04 km^{2})
- Elevation: 545 ft (166 m)

Population (2020)
  - Total: 10,372
  - Density: 1,030.4/sq mi (397.85/km^{2})
- Time zone: UTC-6 (Central (CST))
  - Summer (DST): UTC-5 (CDT)
- ZIP code: 75069
- Area codes: 214, 469, 945, 972
- FIPS code: 48-25224
- GNIS feature ID: 2412617
- Website: www.fairviewtexas.org

Fairview is a town in Collin County, Texas, United States. It is part of the Dallas-Fort Worth metropolitan area. As of the 2020 census, the town population was 10,372. The estimated population in 2023 was 10,790. The town is adjacent to the 289-acre (1.17 km^{2}) Heard Natural Science Museum and Wildlife Sanctuary.

== History ==
A petition to request an incorporation election for Fairview was submitted to the county judge and commissioners' court on April 21, 1958, and following an election on May 7, 1958, and count of all 50 ballots, the town was incorporated, ordered by Collin County Judge W. E. Button.

== Geography ==
Fairview is located just southwest of the geographic center of Collin County. It is bordered by McKinney, the county seat, to the north, by Allen to the west and south, and by Lucas to the southeast. Wilson Creek, a tributary of the East Fork Trinity River, forms part of the northeastern boundary.

According to the United States Census Bureau, Fairview has a total area of 8.7 square miles (22.5 km^{2}), of which 0.02 square miles (0.04 km^{2}), or 0.20%, is covered by water.

== Demographics ==
Historical population
| Census | Pop. | Note | %± |
|---|---|---|---|
| 1970 | 463 | | — |
| 1980 | 893 | | 92.9% |
| 1990 | 1,554 | | 74.0% |
| 2000 | 2,644 | | 70.1% |
| 2010 | 7,248 | | 174.1% |
| 2020 | 10,372 | | 43.1% |
| 2023 (est.) | 10,790 | ▲ | 4.0% |
U.S. Decennial Census

=== Racial and ethnic composition ===
Fairview, Texas - Racial and ethnic composition (NH = Non-Hispanic) (Note: Note: the US Census treats Hispanic/Latino as an ethnic category. This table excludes Latinos from the racial categories and assigns them to a separate category. Hispanics/Latinos can be of any race.)
| Race | Pop 2010 | Pop 2020 | % 2010 | % 2020 |
|---|---|---|---|---|
| White (NH) | 6,102 | 7,581 | 84.19% | 73.1% |
| Black or African American (NH) | 245 | 669 | 3.38% | 6.45% |
| Native American or Alaska Native (NH) | 36 | 39 | 0.50% | 0.38% |
| Asian (NH) | 308 | 821 | 4.25% | 7.92% |
| Pacific Islander (NH) | 0 | 5 | 0.00% | 0.05% |
| Some Other Race (NH) | 4 | 53 | 0.06% | 0.51% |
| Mixed/Multi-Racial (NH) | 103 | 455 | 1.42% | 4.39% |
| Hispanic or Latino | 450 | 748 | 6.21% | 7.21% |
| Total | 7,248 | 10,372 | 100.00% | 100.00% |

=== 2020 census ===
As of the 2020 census, Fairview had a population of 10,372. The median age was 49.0 years. 19.9% of residents were under the age of 18 and 29.9% were 65 years of age or older. For every 100 females there were 91.1 males, and for every 100 females age 18 and over there were 87.9 males age 18 and over.

99.8% of residents lived in urban areas, while 0.2% lived in rural areas.

There were 4,277 households in Fairview, of which 25.5% had children under the age of 18 living in them. There were 2,629 families residing in the town. Of all households, 62.4% were married-couple households, 10.9% were households with a male householder and no spouse or partner present, and 23.3% were households with a female householder and no spouse or partner present. About 25.2% of all households were made up of individuals and 14.3% had someone living alone who was 65 years of age or older.

There were 4,568 housing units, of which 6.4% were vacant. The homeowner vacancy rate was 1.6% and the rental vacancy rate was 12.3%.

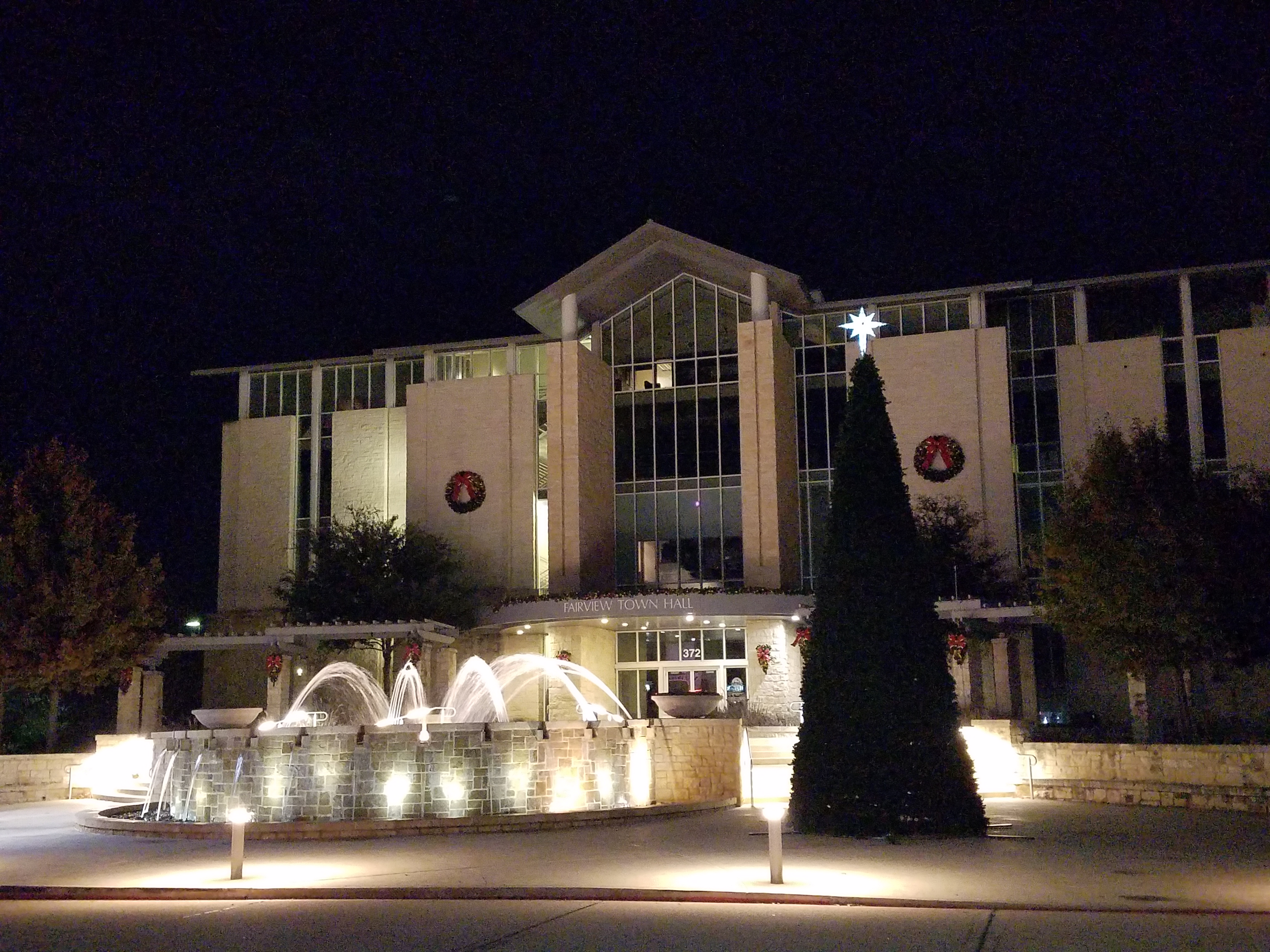
Fairview, Texas Town Hall

== Government ==
The town has a mayor–council government. The town council consists of a mayor and six council members. The current mayor is John Hubbard, who has served in the role since May 2025.

== Education ==
Fairview is served by two school districts, the Lovejoy Independent School District and the McKinney Independent School District.
