= Randy Ramsey =

American football player (born 1995)

No. 56
- Position: Linebacker

Personal information
- Born: September 7, 1995 (age 31); Fort Lauderdale, Florida, U.S.
- Listed height: 6 ft 3 in (1.91 m)
- Listed weight: 238 lb (108 kg)

Career information
- High school: Dillard (Fort Lauderdale)
- College: Arkansas
- NFL draft: 2019: undrafted

Career history
- Green Bay Packers (2019–2021)

Career NFL statistics
- Total tackles: 11
- Stats at Pro Football Reference

Randy Jerry Ramsey (born September 7, 1995) is an American former professional football player who was an outside linebacker for the Green Bay Packers of the National Football League (NFL). He played college football for the Arkansas Razorbacks.

== College career ==
Ramsey played in 39 games for Arkansas registering 90 tackles, 16 tackles for loss and forcing four fumbles, recovering two.

== Professional career ==
After going undrafted in the 2019 NFL draft, Ramsey signed with the Green Bay Packers on May 3, 2019. The Packers released Ramsey on August 31 and re-signed him to their practice squad on September 1. Ramsey spent the entire 2019 season on the Packers' practice squad, and was re-signed by the Packers on January 21, 2020. Ramsey made the 53-man roster for the 2020 season, but missed the first three games with a groin injury. He made his NFL debut on October 5, 2020 during a Week 4 victory over the Atlanta Falcons. He signed an exclusive-rights free agent tender on March 18, 2021, to remain with the Packers. He was placed on injured reserve on August 12, 2021. He signed his tender offer from the Packers on April 18, 2022, to keep him with the team. He was released on August 16, 2022.

== NFL career statistics ==
=== Regular season ===
Year	Team	GP	GS	Tackles					Interceptions						Fumbles	
Year	Team	GP	GS	Total	Solo	Ast	Sck	SFTY	PDef	Int	Yds	Avg	Lng	TDs	FF	FR
2020	GB	12	0	11	5	6	0.0	0	0	0	0	0.0	0	0	0	0
Total		12	0	11	5	6	0.0	0	0	0	0	0.0	0	0	0	0
Source: NFL.com
