= Bumper Pool (American football) =

American football player (born 1999)

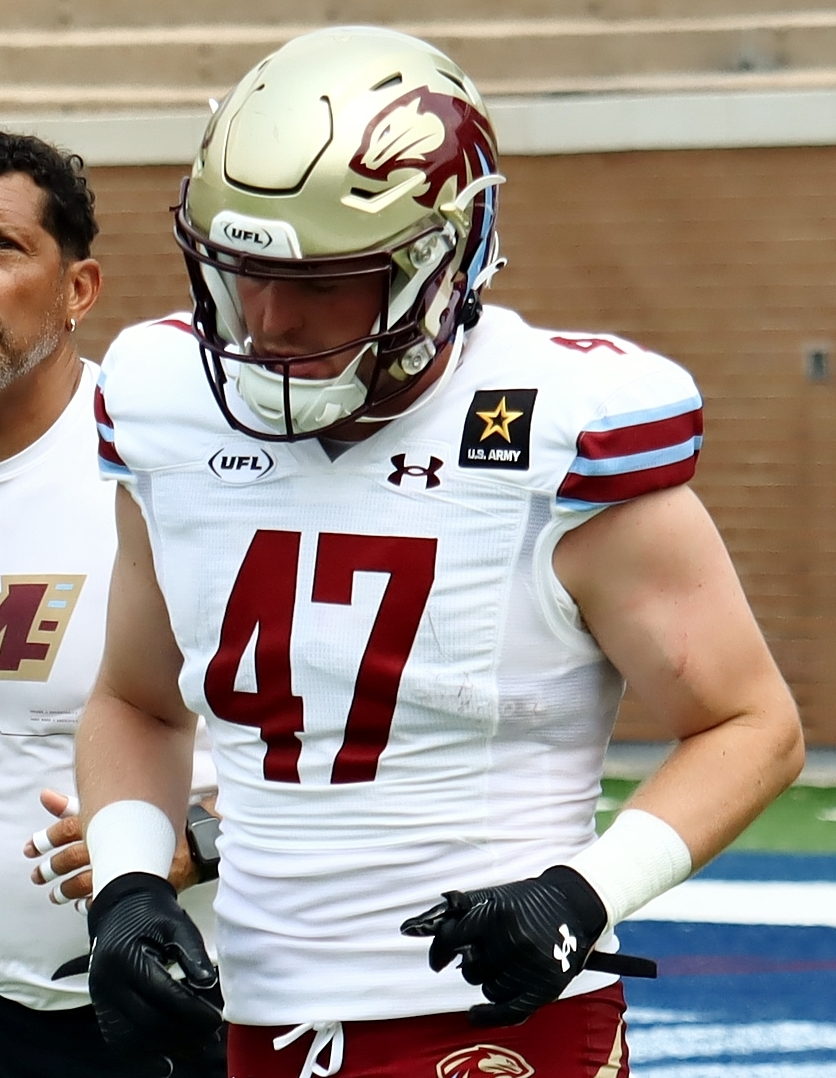
- Pool with the Michigan Panthers in 2024

Profile
- Position: Linebacker

Personal information
- Born: September 28, 1999 (age 27); Lucas, Texas, U.S.
- Listed height: 6 ft 2 in (1.88 m)
- Listed weight: 232 lb (105 kg)

Career information
- High school: Lovejoy (Lucas, Texas)
- College: Arkansas (2018–2022)
- NFL draft: 2023: undrafted

Career history
- Carolina Panthers (2023)*; Michigan Panthers (2024)
- * Offseason or practice squad member only

Awards and highlights
- 3× Second-team All-SEC (2020–2022)
- Stats at Pro Football Reference

Bumper James Morris Pool (born James Morris Pool; September 28, 1999) is an American professional football linebacker. He played college football at Arkansas and he is the school's leader in all-time tackles with 441.

== Early life ==
Pool attended Lovejoy High School in Lucas, Texas. After a performance that included 19 tackles and three tackles for loss, Pool was named the Defensive player of the week by The Dallas Morning News. A four-star recruit, Pool had offers from Arkansas, Michigan, and Alabama. Pool committed to play college football at the University of Arkansas.

== College career ==
In Pool's first career game, as a freshman in 2018, he contributed with six tackles and a fumble return. In his freshman season, Pool played in ten games totaling 29 tackles. As a sophomore in 2019, Pool amassed 94 tackles including 6.5 tackles for loss. The following season, Pool was named to the Second team All-SEC. In a shortened ten-game season, Pool recorded 101 total tackles. He averaged 11.2 tackles per game finishing second in the SEC. In 2021, Pool once again was named to the Second team All-SEC, tallying 125 tackles. Pool decided to return for a fifth year at Arkansas, using the year of eligibility granted from the COVID-19 shortened season. Entering the season, Pool was named to the Butkus Award watch list. Pool was also named to the Phil Steele preseason First team All-SEC and Second team All-American teams. Pool was named the 39th best player in the upcoming college football season by ESPN. In his final season, Pool totaled 92 tackles, 4.5 tackles for loss, and two sacks, while being named to the Second team All-SEC for the third consecutive season. With 441 career tackles, Pool became the school's all-time leading tackler, surpassing Tony Bua's previous record of 408.

== Professional career ==
=== Carolina Panthers ===
Pool was signed by the Carolina Panthers as an undrafted free agent on May 12, 2023. He was waived by the Panthers on August 26.

=== Michigan Panthers ===
On May 22, 2024, Pool signed with the Michigan Panthers of the United Football League (UFL).

== Personal life ==
When Pool was 16, he legally changed his name to Bumper James Morris Pool. The name Bumper originated from his father's love for bumper pool as a child.

Pool appeared in a question of a 2018 episode of Jeopardy!.
