= Armon Watts =

American football player (born 1996)

Profile
- Position: Defensive tackle

Personal information
- Born: July 22, 1996 (age 30); St. Louis, Missouri, U.S.
- Listed height: 6 ft 5 in (1.96 m)
- Listed weight: 295 lb (134 kg)

Career information
- High school: Christian Brothers College (Town and Country, Missouri)
- College: Arkansas (2014–2018)
- NFL draft: 2019: 6th round, 190th overall pick

Career history
- Minnesota Vikings (2019–2021); Chicago Bears (2022); Pittsburgh Steelers (2023); New England Patriots (2024); New York Giants (2024)

Career NFL statistics
- Total tackles: 147
- Sacks: 8.5
- Forced fumbles: 3
- Pass deflections: 1
- Stats at Pro Football Reference

Armon Watts (born July 22, 1996) is an American professional football defensive tackle. He played college football for the Arkansas Razorbacks.

== Professional career ==
Pre-draft measurables
Height	Weight	Arm length	Hand span	40-yard dash	10-yard split	20-yard split	Bench press
6 ft 4 5/8 in (1.95 m)	300 lb (136 kg)	33 3/8 in (0.85 m)	9 5/8 in (0.24 m)	5.23 s	1.81 s	3.04 s	20 reps

=== Minnesota Vikings ===
Watts was selected by the Minnesota Vikings in the sixth round (190th overall) of the 2019 NFL draft.

On November 10, 2019, Watts combined for a sack of Dallas Cowboys quarterback Dak Prescott with teammate Everson Griffen in a 28–24 win on Sunday Night Football. It was his first career game. He was placed on injured reserve on December 31, 2019.

Watts was placed on the reserve/COVID-19 list by the Vikings on August 4, 2020, and was activated two days later.

Watts was waived by the Vikings on August 30, 2022.

=== Chicago Bears ===
On August 31, 2022, Watts was claimed by waivers by the Chicago Bears.

=== Pittsburgh Steelers ===
On April 12, 2023, Watts signed with the Pittsburgh Steelers.

=== New England Patriots ===
On March 15, 2024, Watts signed with the New England Patriots. He was placed on injured reserve on August 27. He was released with an Injury Settlement on October 2, 2024.

=== New York Giants ===
On October 15, 2024, Watts signed with the New York Giants practice squad. He was promoted to the active roster on October 22. On January 3, 2025, Watts was placed on injured reserve with a knee injury.
