= Hjalte Froholdt =

Danish American football player (born 1996)

No. 72 – Arizona Cardinals
- Position: Center
- Roster status: Active

Personal information
- Born: August 20, 1996 (age 30); Svendborg, Denmark
- Listed height: 6 ft 5 in (1.96 m)
- Listed weight: 310 lb (141 kg)

Career information
- High school: IMG Academy (Bradenton, Florida, U.S.)
- College: Arkansas (2015–2018)
- NFL draft: 2019: 4th round, 118th overall pick

Career history
- New England Patriots (2019–2020); Houston Texans (2020–2021); Cleveland Browns (2021–2022); Arizona Cardinals (2023–present)

Awards and highlights
- Second-team All-SEC (2018)

Career NFL statistics as of Week 4, 2026
- Games played: 86
- Games started: 61
- Fumble recoveries: 3
- Stats at Pro Football Reference

Hjalte Froholdt (YEL-də FROH-holt; born August 20, 1996) is a Danish professional American football center for the Arizona Cardinals of the National Football League (NFL). He was selected by the New England Patriots in the fourth round of the 2019 NFL draft. He played college football for the Arkansas Razorbacks.

== Early life ==
Froholdt began playing football in his native Denmark for the Svendborg Admirals. After spending his sophomore year as an exchange student at Warren G. Harding High School in Warren, Ohio, he returned to Denmark and played for the U-19 youth team of the Søllerød Gold Diggers. He then attended IMG Academy in Bradenton, Florida, his senior year before signing to play with the University of Arkansas.

== College career ==
Froholdt was recruited to Arkansas by then–head coach Bret Bielema, who in 2019 was the defensive line coach for the New England Patriots.

In 2015, Froholdt played as a defensive lineman for the Razorbacks before switching to the offensive line in 2016. He played 13 games at left guard in 2016 and another 12 in 2017, not allowing a sack in 2017. He played three games at center in 2018 before moving back to left guard.

In 2019, Froholdt worked Super Bowl LIII as a broadcaster for the Danish media.

== Professional career ==
Pre-draft measurables
Height	Weight	Arm length	Hand span	Wingspan	40-yard dash	10-yard split	20-yard split	20-yard shuttle	Three-cone drill	Vertical jump	Broad jump	Bench press
6 ft 4 5/8 in (1.95 m)	306 lb (139 kg)	31 1/4 in (0.79 m)	9 3/4 in (0.25 m)	6 ft 4 1/2 in (1.94 m)	5.20 s	1.83 s	3.04 s	4.54 s	7.51 s	27.5 in (0.70 m)	8 ft 9 in (2.67 m)	31 reps
All values from NFL Combine

=== New England Patriots ===
Froholdt was selected by the New England Patriots in the fourth round (118th overall) of the 2019 NFL draft, becoming the second Dane to be drafted by an NFL team after Morten Andersen in 1982.

On August 31, 2019, he was placed on injured reserve as a result of a shoulder injury he sustained in Week 4 of preseason against the New York Giants.

On November 21, 2020, Froholdt was waived by the Patriots.

=== Houston Texans ===
On November 23, 2020, Froholdt was claimed off waivers by the Houston Texans. He was placed on the reserve/COVID-19 list by the team on December 17, 2020, and activated on January 13, 2021.

On August 31, 2021, Froholdt was waived by the Texans and re-signed to the practice squad.

=== Cleveland Browns ===
On October 5, 2021, Froholdt was signed by the Cleveland Browns off the Houston Texans' practice squad. He was waived on November 27 and re-signed to the practice squad. Froholdt was elevated to the Browns' active roster as a COVID-19 replacement player on December 24.

The Browns signed Froholdt to a reserve/futures contract on January 10, 2022.

=== Arizona Cardinals ===
On March 15, 2023, Froholdt signed a two-year contract with the Arizona Cardinals. He was named the Week 1 starting center, and started every game in 2023.

On August 21, 2024, Froholdt signed a two-year extension with the Cardinals.

On August 25, 2026, Froholdt signed another two-year extension with the Cardinals.

== Personal life ==
On August 23, 2023, Froholdt announced via Instagram that he and his wife, Ashley, had a baby girl, Lucia Loloma.
