= Lucas, Texas =

- City
- Location of Lucas in Collin County, Texas
- Coordinates: 33°06′39″N 96°34′34″W
- Country: United States
- State: Texas
- County: Collin

Government
  - Type: Mayor-Council

Area
  - Total: 15.91 sq mi (41.20 km^{2})
  - Land: 15.60 sq mi (40.41 km^{2})
  - Water: 0.31 sq mi (0.79 km^{2})
- Elevation: 584 ft (178 m)

Population (2020)
  - Total: 7,612
  - Density: 548.2/sq mi (211.66/km^{2})
- Time zone: UTC-6 (Central (CST))
  - Summer (DST): UTC-5 (CDT)
- Area codes: 214, 469, 945, 972
- FIPS code: 48-45012
- GNIS feature ID: 2410893
- Website: www.lucastexas.us

Lucas is a city in Collin County, Texas, United States. As of the 2010 census the population was 5,166, up from 2,890 at the 2000 census; in 2020, its population was 7,612.

== Geography ==
Lucas is located in south central Collin County and is bordered by Fairview to the north, Allen to the west, Parker to the southwest, Wylie to the south, St. Paul to the southeast, Wylie again to the southeast, and Lavon Lake to the east.

According to the U.S. Census Bureau, the city of Lucas has a total area of 12.6 square miles (32.7 km^{2}), of which 0.02 square miles (0.06 km^{2}), or 0.17%, is water.

Lucas is home to two parks, Kenneth R. Lewis Park and Lucas Community Park. Kenneth R. Lewis Park is equipped with Softball and Soccer fields, a paved walking trail, and a pavilion Park Map. Lucas Community Park has a Main Area with a capacity 80, Mini Kitchenette, Tables available (6 max), and Chairs available (40 max, 20 on Thursday).

== Demographics ==
Historical population
Census	Pop.	Note	%±
1970	540		—
1980	1,371		153.9%
1990	2,205		60.8%
2000	2,890		31.1%
2010	5,166		78.8%
2020	7,612		47.3%
2023 (est.)	8,642		13.5%
U.S. Decennial Census

=== 2020 census ===
As of the 2020 census, Lucas had a population of 7,612. The median age was 42.1 years. 29.4% of residents were under the age of 18 and 11.8% of residents were 65 years of age or older. For every 100 females there were 104.6 males, and for every 100 females age 18 and over there were 101.3 males age 18 and over.

84.6% of residents lived in urban areas, while 15.4% lived in rural areas.

There were 2,255 households in Lucas, of which 50.7% had children under the age of 18 living in them. Of all households, 84.0% were married-couple households, 6.9% were households with a male householder and no spouse or partner present, and 6.9% were households with a female householder and no spouse or partner present. About 6.6% of all households were made up of individuals and 3.2% had someone living alone who was 65 years of age or older.

There were 2,352 housing units, of which 4.1% were vacant. The homeowner vacancy rate was 1.4% and the rental vacancy rate was 6.4%.

Racial composition as of the 2020 census
Race	Number	Percent
White	5,944	78.1%
Black or African American	174	2.3%
American Indian and Alaska Native	59	0.8%
Asian	477	6.3%
Native Hawaiian and Other Pacific Islander	0	0.0%
Some other race	163	2.1%
Two or more races	795	10.4%
Hispanic or Latino (of any race)	728	9.6%

=== 2000 census ===
At the 2000 census there were 2,890 people in 945 households, including 855 families, in the city. The population density was 314.3 inhabitants per square mile (121.4/km^{2}). There were 962 housing units at an average density of 104.6 per square mile (40.4/km^{2}).

In 2000, the racial makup of the city was 80.44% White, 8.42% African American, 0.52% Native American, 0.28% Asian, 0.03% Pacific Islander, 1.00% from other races, and 1.31% from two or more races. Hispanic or Latino of any race were 11.56%.

Of the 945 households 44.9% had children under the living with them, 83.2% were married couples living together, 4.0% had a female householder with no husband present, and 9.5% were non-families. 7.5% of households were one person and 1.8% were one person aged 65 or older. The average household size was 3.06 and the average family size was 3.22.

The age distribution was 30.2% under 18, 5.3% from 18 to 24, 28.8% from 25 to 44, 29.1% from 45 to 64, and 6.6% 65 or older. The median age was 39 years. For every 100 females, there were 98.9 males. For every 100 females age 18 and over, there were 97.9 males.

According to the 2000 census, the median household income was $100,220 and the median family income was $101,014. Males had a median income of $72,471 versus $38,182 for females. The per capita income for the city was $34,020. About 3.9% of families and 4.1% of the population were below the poverty line, including 3.7% of those under age 18 and 5.0% of those age 65 or over.

== Schools ==
The city of Lucas has seven different school districts and private schools within the city limits. The six school districts are as follows:

- Lovejoy Independent School District
- Allen Independent School District
- McKinney Independent School District
- Plano Independent School District
- Princeton Independent School District
- Wylie Independent School District

The private Lucas Christian Academy is also in the city.
