= Allen, Texas =

City in Collin County, Texas, United States

- City
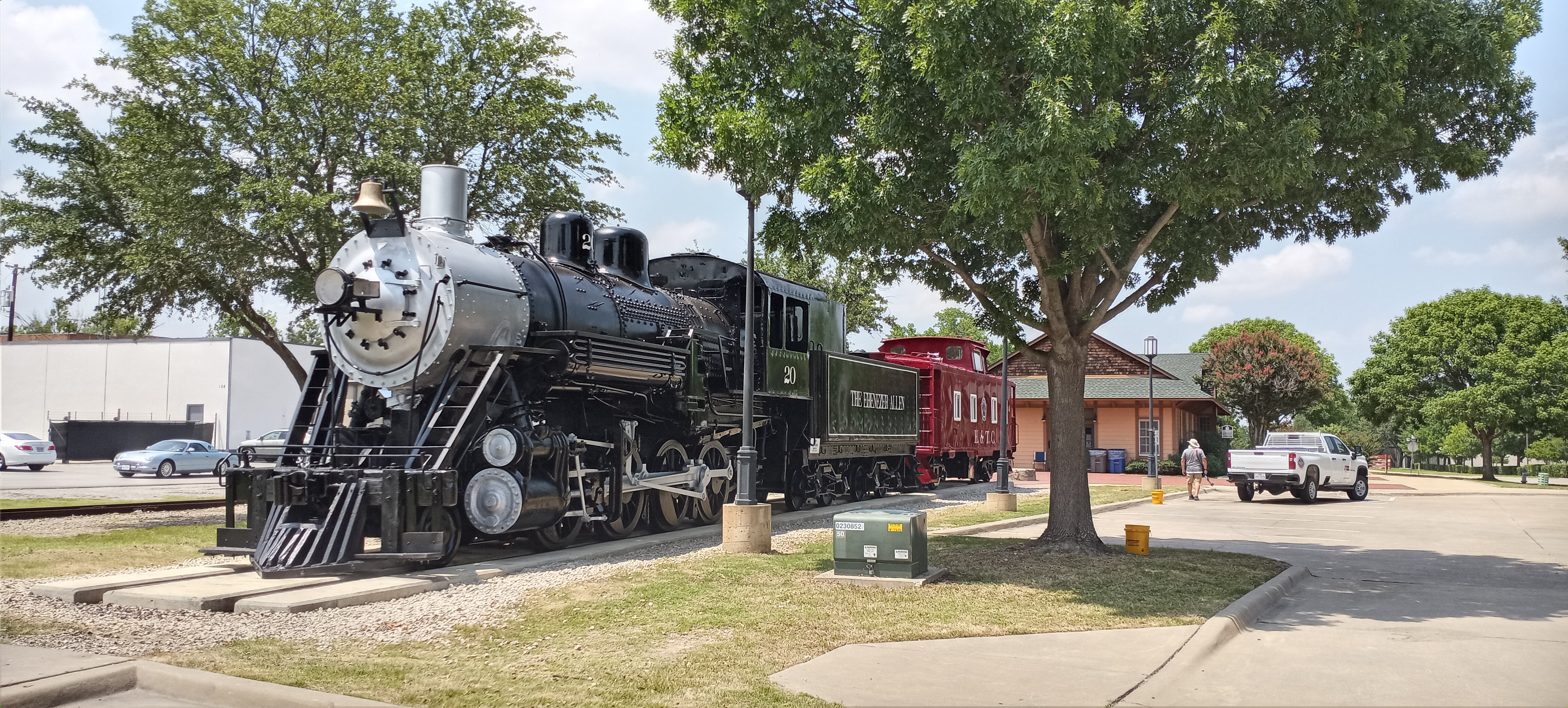
- SDCX steam locomotive next to the Allen Heritage Center

- Flag Logo
- Interactive map of Allen, Texas
- Coordinates: 33°07′37″N 96°39′47″W
- Country: United States
- State: Texas
- County: Collin
- Founded: 1870
- Named: 1872
- Incorporated: 1953
- Named for: Ebenezer Allen

Government
  - Type: Council–manager
  - Body: Allen City Council
  - Mayor: Chris Schulmeister
  - City manager: Eric Ellwanger

Area
  - Total: 26.48 sq mi (68.58 km^{2})
  - Land: 26.40 sq mi (68.38 km^{2})
  - Water: 0.081 sq mi (0.21 km^{2})
- Elevation: 656 ft (200 m)

Population (2020)
  - Total: 104,627
  - Estimate (2025): 113,447
  - Density: 3,963.1/sq mi (1,530.2/km^{2})
- Time zone: UTC−6 (Central (CST))
  - Summer (DST): UTC−5 (CDT)
- ZIP Codes: 75002, 75013
- Area codes: 214, 469, 972, 945
- FIPS code: 48-01924
- GNIS feature ID: 2409684
- Website: cityofallen.org

Allen is a city in Collin County, Texas, United States, and a northern suburb in the Dallas–Fort Worth metroplex. Its population was 104,627 at the 2020 census, and the United States Census Bureau estimated it at 113,447 as of July 1, 2025. The city is about 23 miles (37 km) north of downtown Dallas.

The Houston and Texas Central Railway established Allen in 1870 as a railroad town and named it in 1872 for Ebenezer Allen, a former attorney general of Texas who had promoted the railroad. It stayed a small farming community until the late 1960s. After that it grew quickly as Dallas and Plano expanded and Dallas–Fort Worth International Airport was built. Allen has a council–manager government. The city is home to the ECHL's Allen Americans and to Allen High School, one of the largest high schools in Texas.

== History ==
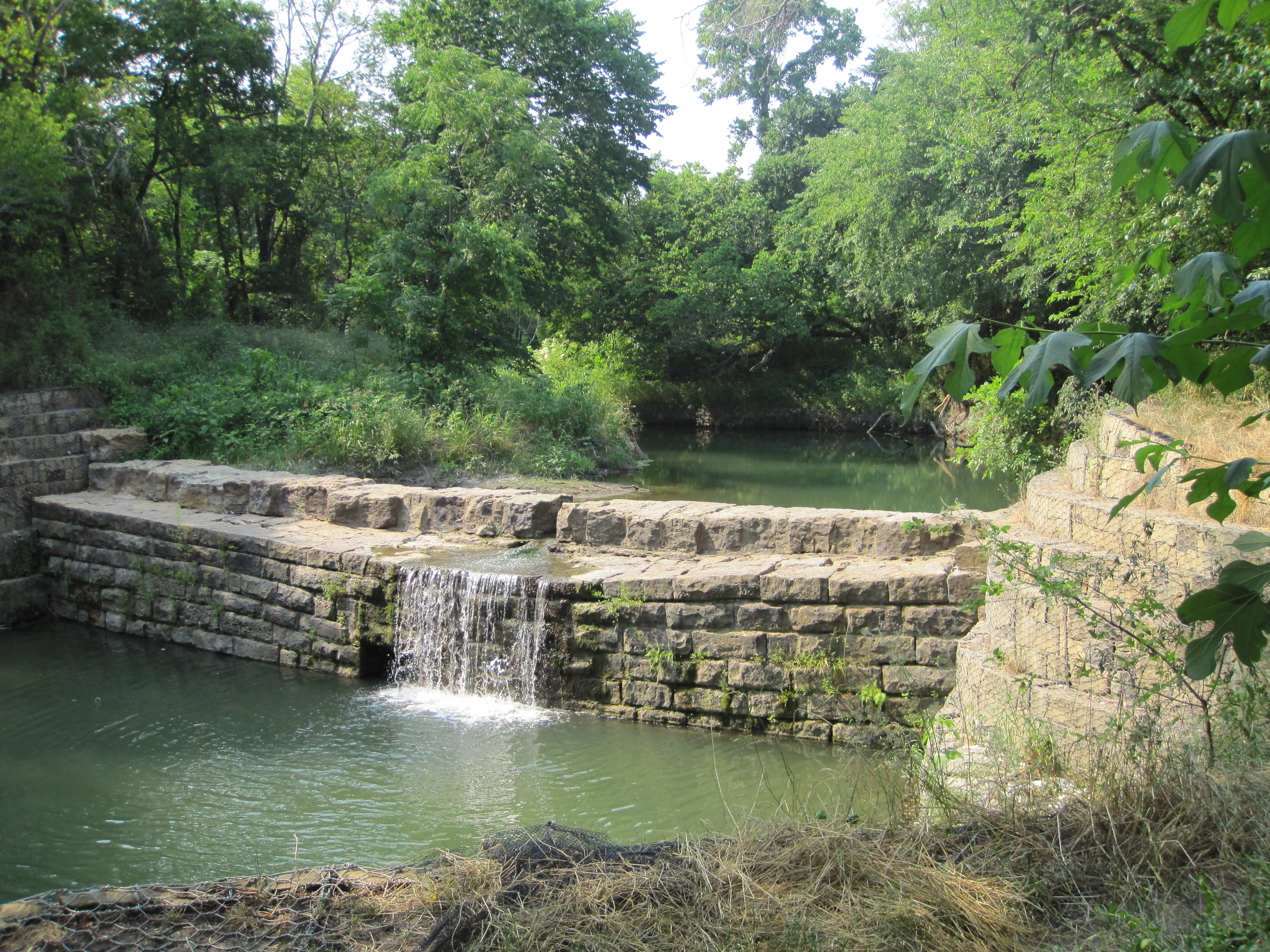
The Allen Water Station, built for the Houston and Texas Central Railroad

=== Early history and the railroad ===
Before American settlement, the area was home to the Caddo, Comanche and other Indigenous peoples. Collin County was first settled between 1840 and 1860. The county was formed in 1846 from part of Fannin County, land that had been part of the Peters Colony. A 1998 Texas Historical Commission marker says fertile land and plentiful water drew settlers to the Allen area from the 1840s. It also says the area was well populated by 1876, when the Houston and Texas Central Railroad built a water supply stop on Cottonwood Creek.

A railroad purchasing agent established the town in 1870, and it was named Allen in 1872. A post office opened in 1876. The railroad made farming more commercial: the marker says the stop gave local farmers a commercial center, better equipment and wider markets, and the open prairie around it was divided into small family farms.

On February 22, 1878, according to the city's historical account, a gang led by Sam Bass robbed a train at Allen. The Handbook of Texas says Bass "supposedly committed the first train robbery in the state" at Allen. Collin County describes it as one of the first train robberies in Texas. (Note: The Handbook of Texas places the robbery "four years" after the 1876 opening of the post office, and Collin County's history gives 1880. Most other accounts date the robbery to February 22, 1878.)

By 1884 Allen had an estimated 350 residents, three churches, a school, a chair factory and a flour mill. In 1908 the Texas Traction Company (later the Texas Electric Railway) built an electric interurban line through the town between Denison and Dallas. The population reached 550 by 1915 but had fallen to about 400 by the mid-1940s. Interurban service ended in 1948.

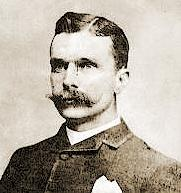
Possible photo of outlaw Sam Bass, who committed the first Texas Train Robbery, in Allen.

=== Suburban growth ===
Allen was incorporated in 1953, with Virgil B. Watson as first mayor, and a population of about 400. It grew rapidly from the late 1960s, from 1,940 residents in 1970 to 8,314 in 1980. The Handbook of Texas attributes the growth to economic expansion in Dallas and Plano and to the construction of Dallas–Fort Worth International Airport. By 1990 Allen had 18,309 residents and was the third-largest town in Collin County. U.S. Highway 75 runs through the city.

North end of Allen showing early construction of Fairview town center and The Village, Arial photo circa 2007.

In 2012 the Allen Independent School District opened Eagle Stadium, an 18,000-seat, $60 million high school football stadium. It was paid for through a voter-approved $119 million bond package. The district closed the stadium in February 2014 after cracks were found in its concourse. An engineering firm hired by the district later found defects that were "primarily engineering failures." The architect, PBK Architects, and the builder, Pogue Construction, paid for repairs costing more than $10 million. The stadium reopened for graduation in June 2015, and football returned there in August 2015.

=== 2023 shooting ===
On May 6, 2023, a gunman opened fire at Allen Premium Outlets, killing eight people and injuring seven others. An Allen police officer who had been nearby on an unrelated call shot and killed the gunman, 33-year-old Mauricio Garcia of Dallas. According to researchers and investigators, Garcia had expressed white supremacist and neo-Nazi views, but his specific motive was not established. The outlet center reopened in June 2023. On the first anniversary in 2024, the city held a remembrance event at the Credit Union of Texas Event Center and a citywide moment of silence at 3:36 p.m. A permanent 11-foot (3.4 m) stainless-steel memorial by Placzek Studios was also unveiled at the outlet center. It includes eight wind chimes, one for each victim.

=== Recent years ===
Chris Schulmeister became mayor in 2026. In his campaign he said Allen had "transitioned from decades of rapid growth to a mature city" and listed downtown revitalization and aging infrastructure among his priorities. In January 2026 the city hosted the Warrior/ECHL All-Star Classic.

== Geography ==
Allen is in southwestern Collin County, eight miles southwest of McKinney. According to the United States Census Bureau, the city has a total area of 26.48 square miles (68.58 km^{2}), of which 26.40 square miles (68.38 km^{2}) is land and 0.08 square miles (0.21 km^{2}) is water.

The city lies in the Northern Blackland Prairie, where the soils are mostly clay and absorb water slowly. Rowlett Creek flows through Allen, Plano and Garland into Lake Ray Hubbard, a Dallas water-supply reservoir in the East Fork of the Trinity River basin. Cottonwood Creek, which flows through the original townsite, is part of the same watershed.

Allen borders Frisco to the northwest, McKinney to the north, Fairview to the northeast, Lucas to the east, Parker to the southeast, and Plano to the west, southwest and south.

=== Climate ===
Allen, Texas

Climate chart (precipitation, max. and min. temperature)
J	F	M	A	M	J	J	A	S	O	N	D
2.6 52 30	3.3 56 34	4.1 63 42	3.7 72 51	5.7 79 61	4.5 86 68	2.4 92 71	1.9 93 70	3 85 63	4.3 74 52	3.9 63 42	3.1 53 33
- █ Average max. and min. temperatures in °F
- █ Precipitation totals in inches
- Source: Weather.com/ NWS
Metric conversion
J	F	M	A	M	J	J	A	S	O	N	D
67 11 −1	84 13 1	103 17 6	94 22 11	145 26 16	114 30 20	62 33 22	48 34 21	77 29 17	109 23 11	98 17 6	77 12 1
- █ Average max. and min. temperatures in °C
- █ Precipitation totals in mm

Allen has a humid subtropical climate (Cfa in the Köppen climate classification), with long, hot summers and cool winters. In the Rowlett Creek watershed, which includes Allen, normal annual precipitation is about 40 to 41 inches, and August high temperatures average about 95 °F.

On the night of April 9–10, 2008, an EF1 tornado with estimated winds of 90 to 95 mph touched down near North Custer Road and Hedgcoxe Road in Allen and lifted near U.S. 75 and State Highway 121 in McKinney. About 50 homes in Allen were structurally damaged and about 300 reported some damage, and insured losses in the city approached $5 million. Shortly after midnight on October 21, 2019, during a tornado outbreak across North Texas, an EF0 tornado with peak winds of about 80 mph tracked 4.8 miles (7.7 km) east from west Allen across U.S. 75 into Fairview. It tore shingles from houses and knocked down trees and fences.

== Demographics ==
Historical population
Census	Pop.	Note	%±
1880	96		—
1890	125		30.2%
1900	215		72.0%
1910	219		1.9%
1920	222		1.4%
1930	267		20.3%
1940	309		15.7%
1950	512		65.7%
1960	659		28.7%
1970	1,940		194.4%
1980	8,314		328.6%
1990	18,309		120.2%
2000	43,554		137.9%
2010	84,246		93.4%
2020	104,627		24.2%
2025 (est.)	113,447		8.4%
U.S. Decennial Census; Texas Almanac: 1850–2000

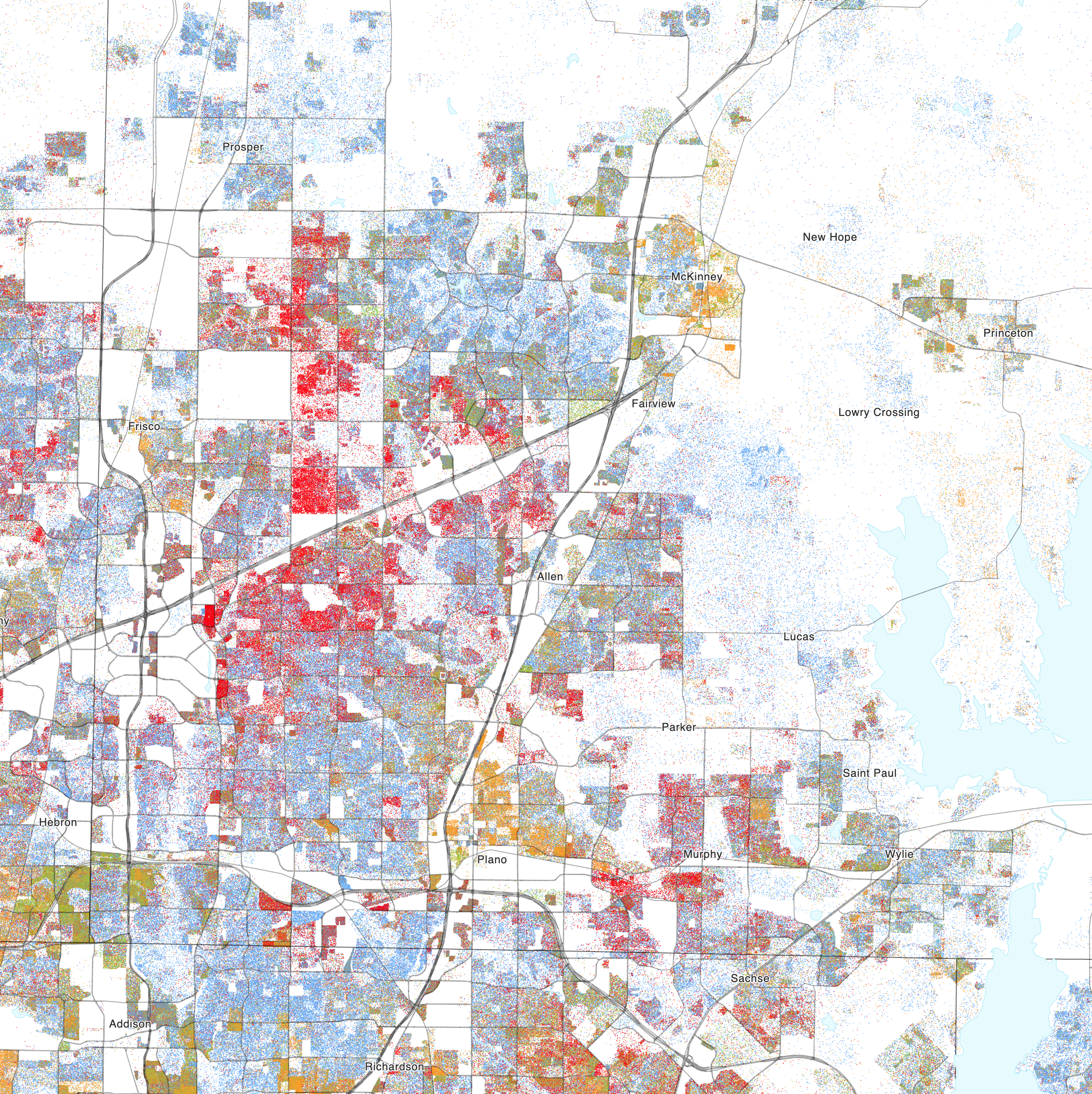
Map of racial distribution in Allen, 2020 U.S. census. Each dot is one person: ⬤ White ⬤ Black ⬤ Asian ⬤ Hispanic ⬤ Multiracial ⬤ Native American/Other

=== Racial and ethnic composition ===
Allen city, Texas – Racial and ethnic composition Note: the US Census treats Hispanic/Latino as an ethnic category. This table excludes Latinos from the racial categories and assigns them to a separate category. Hispanics/Latinos may be of any race.
Race / Ethnicity (NH = Non-Hispanic)	Pop 2000	Pop 2010	Pop 2020	% 2000	% 2010	% 2020
White alone (NH)	36,239	54,690	53,330	83.20%	64.92%	50.97%
Black or African American alone (NH)	1,889	6,891	10,058	4.34%	8.18%	9.61%
Native American or Alaska Native alone (NH)	188	372	344	0.43%	0.44%	0.33%
Asian alone (NH)	1,617	10,772	22,348	3.71%	12.79%	21.36%
Native Hawaiian or Pacific Islander alone (NH)	18	40	54	0.04%	0.05%	0.05%
Other race alone (NH)	41	158	442	0.09%	0.19%	0.42%
Mixed race or multiracial (NH)	524	1,880	4,854	1.20%	2.23%	4.64%
Hispanic or Latino (any race)	3,038	9,443	13,197	6.98%	11.21%	12.61%
Total	43,554	84,246	104,627	100.00%	100.00%	100.00%

Between 2000 and 2020 the city became much more diverse. The share of residents who were non-Hispanic white fell from 83.2% to 51.0%, and the non-Hispanic Asian share grew from 3.7% to 21.4%. The Census Bureau's 2025 estimates put the Asian-alone share at 21.1% and the non-Hispanic white share at 47.4%.

=== 2020 census ===
At the 2020 census, Allen had 104,627 people, 35,491 households and 28,117 families. The median age was 37.8 years. Of the residents, 27.2% were under 18 and 10.3% were 65 or older. For every 100 females there were 95.2 males. All residents lived in urban areas.

Of all households, 44.4% had children under 18 and 64.0% were married couples. About 17.1% of households were made up of individuals, and 5.5% had someone 65 or older living alone. There were 36,962 housing units, of which 4.0% were vacant, and 69.8% of occupied units were owner-occupied.

=== American Community Survey ===
The 2020–2024 American Community Survey five-year estimates show 37,243 households averaging 2.95 people each. The median household income was $130,901, per capita income was $55,986, and 6.1% of residents lived in poverty. Among adults 25 and older, 95.8% had finished high school and 57.5% held a bachelor's degree or higher. The median value of an owner-occupied home was $464,100, and the median gross rent was $1,932. About 23.6% of residents were born outside the United States, and 31.9% of residents aged five and older spoke a language other than English at home. The average commute to work was 28.0 minutes.

== Economy ==
Allen collects the 2% local sales tax allowed by Texas law. One percentage point funds city operations, and the other is split equally between the Allen Economic Development Corporation (AEDC) and the Allen Community Development Corporation (ACDC). Voters approved the AEDC in 1992. The city's financial reports treat both corporations as component units: legally separate entities for which the city is financially accountable. The fiscal 2023 report says the city "is largely dependent upon retail sales."

Recent business relocations recruited by the AEDC include the following. Sol-Ark, a maker of solar power inverters, committed to moving its headquarters and production into 300,000 square feet (28,000 m^{2}) in Allen, which was expected to bring 400 jobs. Grupo Omnilife, a Mexico-based supplement maker, placed its headquarters and a distribution facility in Allen. Fibergrate Composite Structures moved its corporate headquarters to Allen in 2024.

=== Principal employers ===
The following were the city's largest employers according to the fiscal 2023 Annual Comprehensive Financial Report.

#	Employer	Type of business	Employees
1	Allen Independent School District	Education	2,755
2	City of Allen	Government	937
3	Experian	Credit reporting and information services	817
4	Andrews Distributing	Beverage distribution	487
5	Jack Henry & Associates	Financial technology	450
6	Motorola Solutions	Communications equipment	436
7	Texas Health Presbyterian Hospital Allen	Health care	425
8	Credit Union of Texas	Credit union	424
9	NetScout	Network performance management	420
10	Crawford & Company	Claims management and outsourcing	365

=== Retail and development ===
The city's main shopping and mixed-use centers are Allen Premium Outlets, Watters Creek at Montgomery Farm, and The Village at Allen. Watters Creek includes a 79,000-square-foot (7,300 m^{2}) convention center operated with a Marriott hotel. The city has five tax increment reinvestment zones: the Garden District, the Central Business District, The Farm, Sloan Corners, and the Hotel and Convention Center zone.

== Arts and culture ==
In the late 1980s and early 1990s, the Allen-based company Lyrick Studios produced the children's franchise Barney, with early seasons being filmed at Color Dynamic Studios in Allen. Lyrick was bought in 2001 and merged into HIT Entertainment.

The Allen Heritage Center is in the city's historic railroad depot, and a fully restored 1910 SDCX steam locomotive, "Ebenezer Allen #20", sits beside it. At the Depot, visitors can see local historical displays, artifacts from the 1878 Sam Bass train robbery, the Interurban, and a replica station master's office.

The Allen Public Library was expanded in 2025, and the FY2025–26 budget added staff for the larger building.

Each summer the city holds the Allen USA Celebration, an Independence Day festival with concerts, food vendors and fireworks, usually on the last Saturday in June.

== Parks and recreation ==
According to Visit Allen, the city's tourism office, the city has 1,864 acres of parkland, 53 parks, more than 80 miles of hike-and-bike trails, and nine recreation facilities. Its facilities include the Joe Farmer Recreation Center, the Stephen G. Terrell Recreation Center (opened in 2024), the Don Rodenbaugh Natatorium, the Allen Community Ice Rink, Ford Pool, the Allen Senior Recreation Center, and The Edge Skate Park. In October 2004 the city bought the Chase Oaks Golf Club, just south of the city in Plano, and renamed it The Courses at Watters Creek. The city's financial statements report the golf course as a business-type activity. The FY2025–26 budget created a two-member trail maintenance crew.

== Sports ==
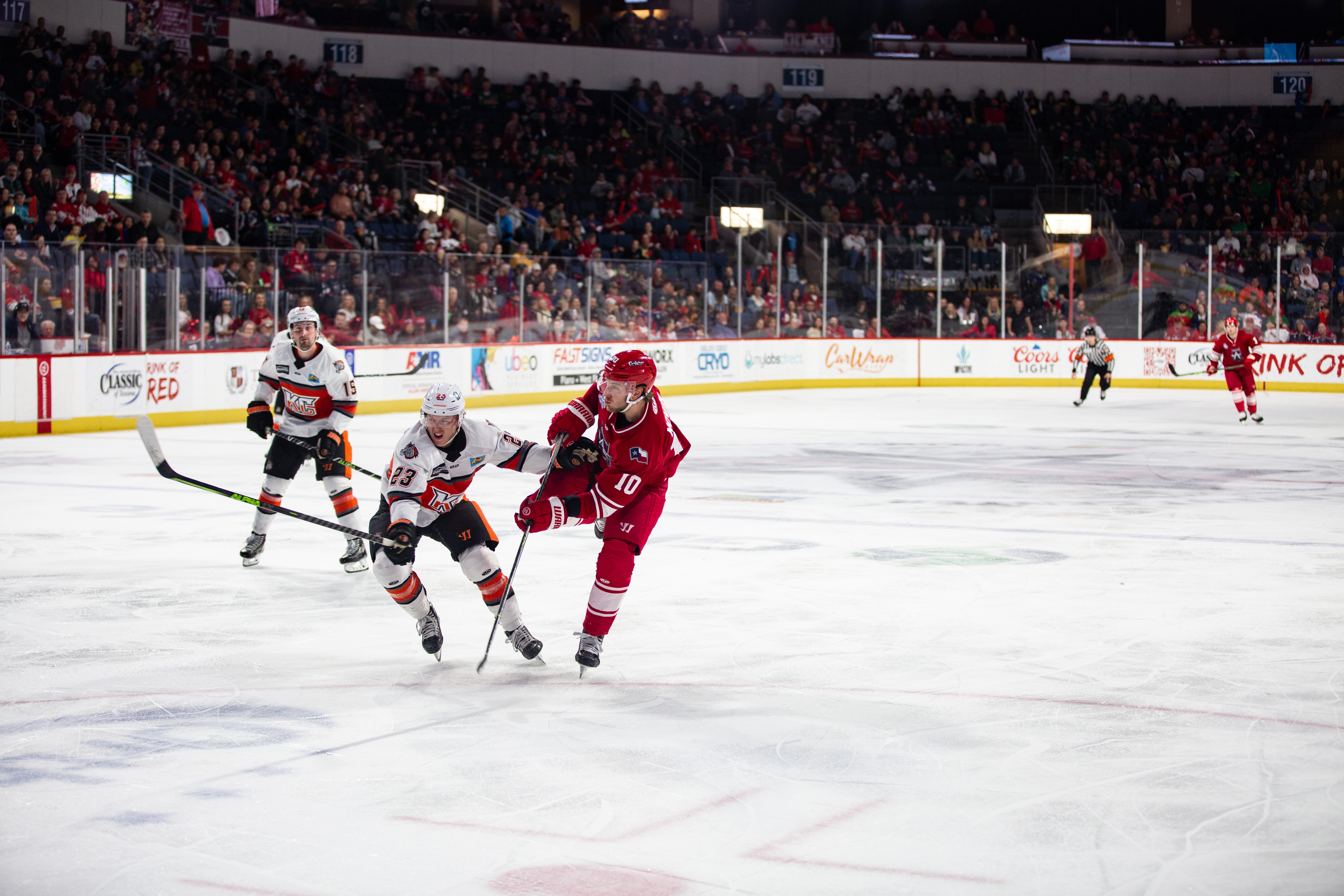
An Allen Americans hockey game at the Credit Union of Texas Event Center

The city-owned Credit Union of Texas Event Center, a 7,500-seat arena formerly called the Allen Event Center, opened in November 2009. It is the home arena of the Allen Americans of the ECHL, who were affiliated with the Ottawa Senators and Belleville Senators in the 2025–26 season. The arena hosted the 2026 Warrior/ECHL All-Star Classic on January 19, 2026. The Dallas Sidekicks indoor soccer team played at the arena from 2012, but did not take part in the Major Arena Soccer League's 2025–26 season.

Allen High School's football team plays at Eagle Stadium. It won state championships in 2008, 2012, 2013, 2014 and 2017. The stadium opened on August 31, 2012.

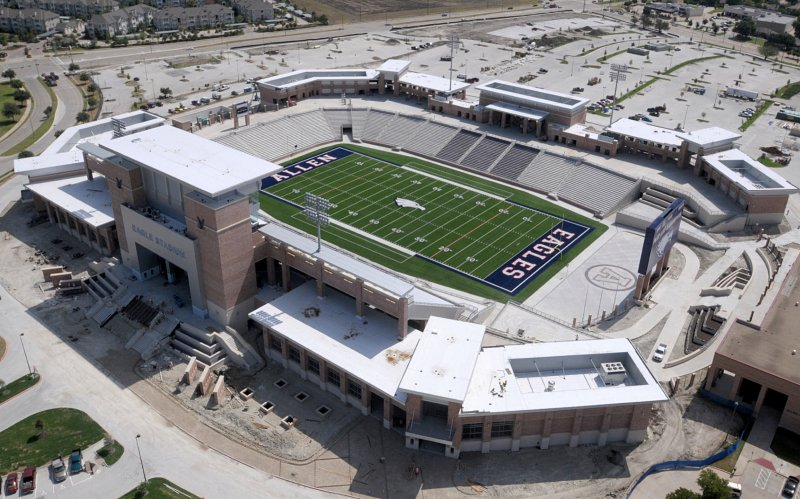
Allen High School's Eagle Stadium

== Government ==
=== Municipal government ===
Allen has a council–manager government. The council is made up of the mayor and six council members, all elected citywide to staggered three-year terms. Mayors are term-limited; Baine Brooks could not run again in 2026 for that reason. In the May 2, 2026 election, Chris Schulmeister, a council member from 2019 to 2025, defeated Dave Shafer by 3,278 votes (81%) to 764, according to unofficial final Collin County totals. Council member Tommy Baril was re-elected unopposed. Collin County Elections reported that 4,070 ballots were cast, a turnout of 5.59% of registered voters. The council appoints a city manager to run day-to-day operations. As of September 2025 the city manager was Eric Ellwanger. Allen is a voluntary member of the North Central Texas Council of Governments.

On September 8, 2026, the council adopted a property tax rate of 41.47 cents per $100 of taxable value for fiscal year 2026–27, down from 41.54 cents. The city estimated the city tax bill on a median-valued homestead of $492,609 at $2,042.85. The city described a $366.5 million citywide budget. Community Impact reported a $380 million total, made up of $157.3 million in general fund revenue and $222 million in special revenue. It also reported that this was the 34th year in Allen's history in which the city had lowered its tax rate. In FY2025–26, property taxes made up 47.6% of the city's budget.

=== Mayors ===
Mayor	Term
Virgil B. Watson	c. 1953–1960
Gentry T. Jones	c. 1962–1966
Frank Dugger	c. 1969–1978
Mickey Pierson	c. 1978–1982
Donald P. Rodenbaugh	c. 1987
Joe Farmer	c. 1989–1996
Steve Terrell	1997–2020
Debbie Stout	2020
Ken Fulk	c. 2020–2023
Baine Brooks	2023–2026
Chris Schulmeister	2026–present

=== Politics ===
Like the rest of Collin County, Allen voted solidly Republican in presidential elections through the early 2000s. It shifted toward the Democratic Party in later elections, and in 2020 Democrat Joe Biden narrowly carried the city.

Allen city vote by party in presidential elections
Year	Democratic	Republican	Third parties
2020	49.38% 25,419	48.40% 24,915	2.21% 1,139
2016	40.48% 15,925	54.34% 21,379	5.18% 2,039
2012	33.85% 11,548	64.45% 21,984	1.70% 580
2008	36.86% 12,111	61.93% 20,349	1.22% 400

In 2024, Collin County as a whole voted for Donald Trump over Kamala Harris, about 54% to 43%.

=== State and federal representation ===
In the Texas Senate, Allen is in District 8, represented by Angela Paxton (R), whose district office is in Allen. In the Texas House of Representatives, most of the city is in District 67, represented by Jeff Leach (R), and District 89, represented by Candy Noble (R). KERA reported in 2025 that District 70 also takes in part of Allen, represented by Mihaela Plesa (D). Leach and Noble both won their March 2026 Republican primaries and are on the November 2026 general-election ballot along with their Democratic opponents who are Jordan Wheatley and Angie Carraway respectively.

In the United States House of Representatives, Allen is in Texas's 3rd congressional district, represented by Keith Self (R) since 2023. Texas redrew its congressional map in August 2025. After a federal court blocked the map and the U.S. Supreme Court intervened, the new map is in use for the 2026 elections. Texas's U.S. senators are John Cornyn (R) and Ted Cruz (R). Cornyn's seat is up for election in November 2026.

== Education ==
=== Public schools ===
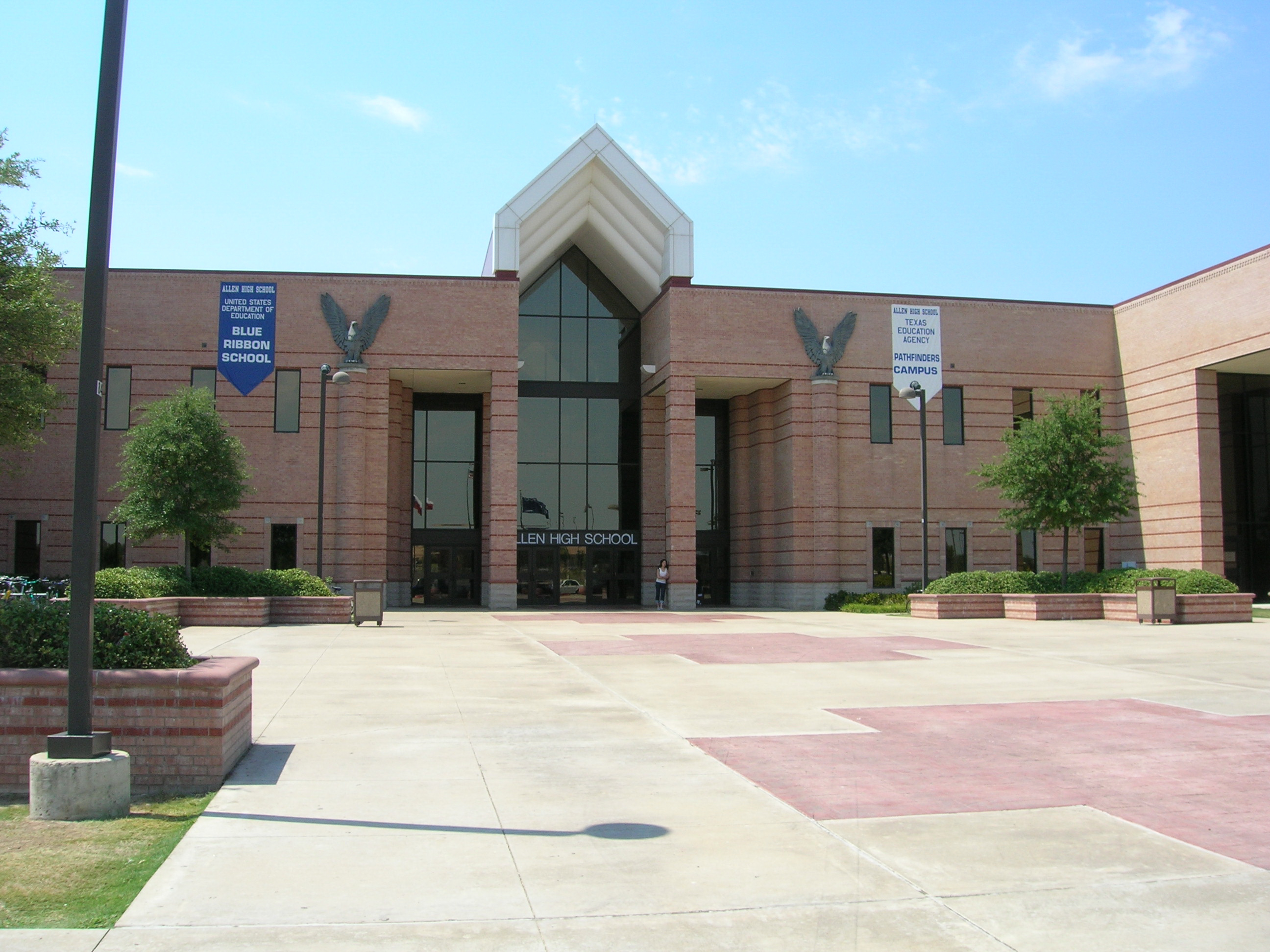
Allen High School

Most of Allen is served by the Allen Independent School District, which covers 27.1 square miles and also includes parts of Parker and McKinney. In the 2024–25 school year the district ran one early childhood school, 16 elementary schools, three middle schools, a ninth-grade center, the STEAM Center, and one high school. Unlike most districts of its size, it sends all students to a single high school, Allen High School, which serves grades 10–12. Ninth graders attend the Lowery Freshman Center. The Texas Education Agency reported 20,092 students in 2025–26 and gave the district an overall A rating (90 out of 100). In November 2024 voters approved a $442.1 million bond.

Parts of the city are in the Lovejoy, McKinney and Plano school districts.

=== Higher education ===
Collin College opened its Technical Campus in west Allen in 2020. The 340,000-square-foot (32,000 m^{2}) campus is dedicated to workforce education. The college also offers dual-credit courses to Allen High School students.

== Infrastructure ==
=== Transportation ===
U.S. Highway 75 (Central Expressway) runs north–south through Allen. State Highway 121 (the Sam Rayburn Tollway) runs along the city's northwestern edge, near the McKinney border. Major arterial roads include Stacy Road, Exchange Parkway, McDermott Drive, Main Street, Bethany Drive, Alma Drive, Greenville Avenue, Allen Heights Drive and Angel Parkway.

Allen has no fixed-route public transit and is not a member of Dallas Area Rapid Transit (DART). The city says that joining DART would require a 1% sales tax dedicated to the agency, which would eliminate sales-tax funding for the AEDC and ACDC, and that it has no plans to reallocate that money. The Texoma Area Paratransit System (TAPS) ran bus routes in Allen from 2013 until it suspended Collin County bus service in 2015.

Since February 2024 the Denton County Transportation Authority has operated Collin County Rides for Allen and Fairview. It is an appointment-based service for residents who are 65 or older or have a qualifying disability, covering trips within Collin County that start or end in Allen or Fairview. DART operated the program before then.

The nearest commercial airports are Dallas Fort Worth International Airport, southwest of Allen, and Dallas Love Field, to the south-southwest.

=== Utilities, health care and public safety ===
The city runs its own water, sewer, solid waste and drainage utilities as business-type activities. Texas Health Presbyterian Hospital Allen is one of the city's ten largest employers. Police and fire services come from the Allen Police Department and Allen Fire Department. The FY2025–26 budget added three firefighter-paramedics, three police officers and two detention officers.

== Notable people ==
- Laura Bailey, voice actress; grew up in Allen
- Matt Barr, actor; attended Allen High School
- Kathleen Baskin-Ball (1958–2008), United Methodist minister; senior pastor of Suncreek United Methodist Church in Allen
- George Benyola, NFL placekicker; Allen High School graduate
- Evan Bernstein, Greco-Roman wrestler who competed for Israel at the 1988 Summer Olympics; Allen resident
- Quenlin Blackwell, social media personality; attended Allen High School
- General Booty, college football quarterback; played at Allen High School
- Dan Buckner, professional football wide receiver; Allen High School graduate
- Reuben Chesang, Kenyan runner and 1994 Commonwealth Games 1500 m gold medalist; Allen resident
- Chris Clements, soccer defender; born in Allen and an Allen High School graduate
- Casey Dick, Arkansas Razorbacks quarterback (2005–2008) and high school football coach; Allen High School graduate
- Amanda Dunbar, artist and member of the Texas Women's Hall of Fame; Allen High School graduate
- Bobby Evans, NFL offensive lineman; Allen High School graduate
- A.J. Ferrari, freestyle and collegiate wrestler and NCAA champion; Allen High School graduate
- Keith "Youngin" George II, technology and music executive; Allen High School graduate
- Burton Gilliam, actor (Blazing Saddles, Paper Moon); Allen resident
- Dawn Greathouse, soccer player and coach; Allen High School graduate
- Jalen Guyton, NFL wide receiver; Allen High School graduate
- Ray Hill (1975–2015), NFL defensive back; lived in Allen until his death
- Tony Hill, Dallas Cowboys wide receiver and Super Bowl XII champion; has worked for the City of Allen
- Hal Hunter, fullback for the Transylvania Pioneers and 1915 All-Southern selection; Allen native
- JP Hurlbert, ice hockey forward; selected 23rd overall by the Detroit Red Wings in the 2026 NHL entry draft; Allen native
- Jaylon Jones, NFL cornerback; Allen High School graduate
- Tejan Koroma, NFL center; Allen High School graduate
- Candie Kung, LPGA Tour golfer; Allen resident
- Matt "Zyos" Leto, professional Halo player and game designer; Allen High School graduate
- Greg Little, NFL offensive tackle; Allen High School graduate
- Pat McCarty, professional cyclist; grew up in Allen
- Julie McCullough, actress and model; Allen High School graduate
- Kyler Murray, NFL quarterback, 2018 Heisman Trophy winner and first overall pick in the 2019 NFL draft; Allen High School graduate
- Bo Nickal, mixed martial artist and three-time NCAA wrestling champion; Allen High School graduate
- Uzoma Nwachukwu, NFL wide receiver; Allen High School graduate
- Cedric Ogbuehi, NFL offensive tackle; Allen High School graduate
- Levi Onwuzurike, NFL defensive tackle; from Allen
- Jim Parrack, actor; from Allen
- Carly Patterson, gymnast and 2004 Olympic all-around champion; lived in Allen during her competitive career
- August Ponthier, singer-songwriter; born in Allen
- Paul Russell, musician; attended Allen High School
- Christian Sam, NFL linebacker; Allen High School graduate
- Will Sherman, NFL offensive lineman; Allen High School graduate
- Doug Skene, NFL offensive lineman; Allen High School graduate
- Brian J. Smith, actor (Stargate Universe, Sense8) and 2014 Tony Award nominee; Allen native
- Isaiah Stevens, basketball player; Allen High School graduate
- Steven Terrell, NFL defensive back; Allen High School graduate
- Shawn Tolleson, MLB pitcher; Allen High School graduate
- Jaylon Tyson, Cleveland Cavaliers basketball player; born in Allen
- Jordyn Tyson, New Orleans Saints wide receiver and eighth overall pick in the 2026 NFL draft; Allen High School graduate
- Ava Verdeflor, artistic gymnast who represented the Philippines; grew up in Allen
- J. D. Walton, NFL center; Allen High School graduate
- Jonathan Williams, NFL running back; Allen High School graduate
- Alex Yarbrough, baseball second baseman and 2012 college All-American at Ole Miss; born in Allen and an Allen High School graduate
