= Will Sherman (offensive lineman) =

American football player (born 1999)

William Sherman
No. 66 – New Orleans Saints
- Position: Guard
- Roster status: Active

Personal information
- Born: May 27, 1999 (age 27); Raleigh, North Carolina, U.S.
- Listed height: 6 ft 4 in (1.93 m)
- Listed weight: 300 lb (136 kg)

Career information
- High school: Allen (Allen, Texas)
- College: Colorado (2017–2020)
- NFL draft: 2021: 6th round, 197th overall pick

Career history
- New England Patriots (2021–2022); Denver Broncos (2022–2024); New Orleans Saints (2025–present)

Career NFL statistics as of Week 15, 2025
- Games played: 5
- Stats at Pro Football Reference

William Sherman (born May 27, 1999) is an American professional football guard for the New Orleans Saints of the National Football League (NFL). He played college football for the Colorado Buffaloes, and was selected by the New England Patriots in the sixth round of the 2021 NFL draft.

== Early life ==
Sherman attended Allen High School under coach Terry Gambill, where he was teammates with Greg Little and Kyler Murray. He played varsity every year except his freshman one. He also threw the shot put and discus in track & field for Allen High School.

== College career ==
He played college football for the Colorado Buffaloes.

== Professional career ==
Pre-draft measurables
Height	Weight	Arm length	Hand span	Wingspan	40-yard dash	10-yard split	20-yard split	20-yard shuttle	Three-cone drill	Vertical jump	Broad jump	Bench press
6 ft 3 1/4 in (1.91 m)	304 lb (138 kg)	33 1/2 in (0.85 m)	10 in (0.25 m)	6 ft 9 5/8 in (2.07 m)	5.18 s	1.86 s	3.03 s	4.86 s	7.71 s	26.0 in (0.66 m)	9 ft 0 in (2.74 m)	23 reps
All values from Pro Day

=== New England Patriots ===
Sherman was selected in the sixth round, 197th overall, of the 2021 NFL draft by the New England Patriots. On May 11, 2021, Sherman officially signed with the Patriots. He was waived on August 31, and re-signed to the practice squad. He signed a reserve/future contract with the Patriots on January 17, 2022. On August 30, Sherman was waived by the Patriots.

=== Denver Broncos ===
On September 1, 2022, Sherman signed with the Denver Broncos practice squad. He was promoted to the active roster on January 3, 2023.

On August 29, 2023, Sherman was waived by the Broncos and re-signed to the practice squad. He signed a reserve/future contract with Denver on January 8, 2024.

On August 27, 2024, Sherman was waived by the Broncos. The next day, he was re-signed the practice squad. On October 8, Sherman was placed on the practice squad injury list. The day after, he was released with an injury settlement. On January 6, he was re-signed to the practice squad once again.

Sherman signed a reserve/future contract with the Broncos on January 13, 2025. On August 26, Sherman was waived by the Broncos for the fourth time in his career.

=== New Orleans Saints ===
On September 17, 2025, Sherman signed with the New Orleans Saints' practice squad. On December 3, he was signed to the active roster.
