= Parker, Texas =

- City
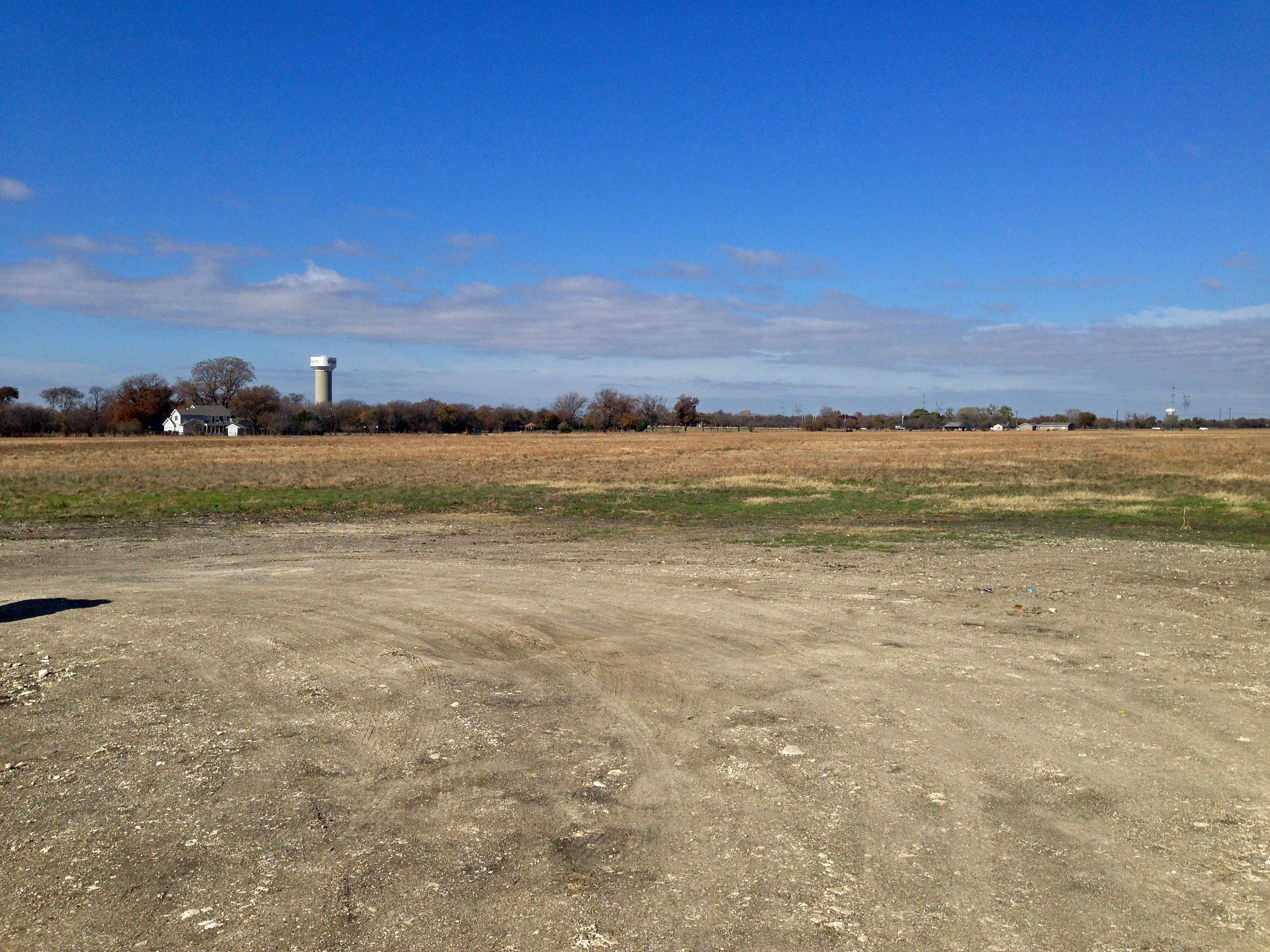

- Location of Parker in Collin County, Texas
- Coordinates: 33°03′22″N 96°37′47″W
- Country: United States
- State: Texas
- County: Collin

Area
  - Total: 8.54 sq mi (22.13 km^{2})
  - Land: 8.52 sq mi (22.06 km^{2})
  - Water: 0.027 sq mi (0.07 km^{2})
- Elevation: 610 ft (190 m)

Population (2020)
  - Total: 5,462
  - Density: 641.3/sq mi (247.6/km^{2})
- Time zone: UTC-6 (Central (CST))
  - Summer (DST): UTC-5 (CDT)
- Area codes: 214, 469, 945, 972
- FIPS code: 48-55152
- GNIS feature ID: 2411374
- Website: www.parkertexas.us

Parker is a city in Collin County, Texas, United States. The population was 5,462 in 2020.

== History ==
The first settlers arrived in the area that is now Parker in the early 1840s. The town was named after William C. Parker, the son of the area's first known settler, John C. Parker. It was incorporated as a city on March 22, 1969.

Corinth Presbyterian Church was founded in Parker in 1846, with the current sanctuary built in 1923, and is thought to be the oldest continuing congregation in Collin County.

== Geography ==
Parker is located in southern Collin County and is bordered to the north by Allen, to the west by Plano, to the south by Murphy, to the southeast by Wylie, and to the northeast by Lucas. It is 26 miles (42 km) northeast of the center of Dallas.

According to the United States Census Bureau, the city has a total area of 8.0 square miles (20.6 km^{2}), of which 0.04 square miles (0.1 km^{2}), or 0.39%, is water. Parker is the location of the Southfork Ranch, the setting used in the television series Dallas.

== Demographics ==
Historical population
Census	Pop.	Note	%±
1970	367		—
1980	1,098		199.2%
1990	1,235		12.5%
2000	1,379		11.7%
2010	3,811		176.4%
2020	5,462		43.3%
2023 (est.)	6,192		13.4%
U.S. Decennial Census

=== 2020 census ===
As of the 2020 census, Parker had a population of 5,462 people; the redistricting summary also recorded 1,250 households and 1,228 families residing in the city. The DP1 profile recorded a median age of 42.4 years, with 26.3% of residents under the age of 18 and 14.3% age 65 or older; for every 100 females there were 101.3 males and for every 100 females age 18 and over there were 99.0 males.

75.9% of residents lived in urban areas, while 24.1% lived in rural areas.

There were 1,651 households in Parker, of which 45.1% had children under the age of 18 living in them. Of all households, 82.7% were married-couple households, 6.8% were households with a male householder and no spouse or partner present, and 7.9% were households with a female householder and no spouse or partner present. About 5.8% of all households were made up of individuals and 3.5% had someone living alone who was 65 years of age or older.

There were 1,715 housing units, of which 3.7% were vacant. The homeowner vacancy rate was 1.0% and the rental vacancy rate was 5.6%.

Racial composition as of the 2020 census
Race	Number	Percent
White	3,286	60.2%
Black or African American	335	6.1%
American Indian and Alaska Native	17	0.3%
Asian	1,042	19.1%
Native Hawaiian and Other Pacific Islander	1	0.0%
Some other race	217	4.0%
Two or more races	564	10.3%
Hispanic or Latino (of any race)	676	12.4%

Parker racial composition as of 2020 (NH = Non-Hispanic) (Note: Note: the US Census treats Hispanic/Latino as an ethnic category. This table excludes Latinos from the racial categories and assigns them to a separate category. Hispanics/Latinos can be of any race.)
Race	Number	Percentage
White (NH)	3,148	57.63%
Black or African American (NH)	333	6.1%
Native American or Alaska Native (NH)	7	0.13%
Asian (NH)	1,036	18.97%
Some Other Race (NH)	28	0.51%
Mixed/Multi-Racial (NH)	234	4.28%
Hispanic or Latino	676	12.38%
Total	5,462	

== Education ==
A small part of Parker is served by the Allen Independent School District, while the majority is served by the Plano Independent School District.

The portion of Parker in AISD is served by Allen High School. The portion of Parker in PISD is served by Plano East Senior High School.

== Notable people ==
- Patrisha Zobel de Ayala, CEO Emeritus of Ayala Conglomerates and Harvard Medical School alumna
- Anna Kotchneva, gymnast
- Jodie Anne Laubenberg, served in the Texas House of Representatives from 2003 to 2018
- Nastia Liukin, gymnast, 2008 Olympic Individual All-Around Gold medalist
- Valeri Liukin, gymnast, 1988 Olympic Horizontal Bar gold medalist
- Rich Templeton, CEO of Texas Instruments
