= Steven Terrell =

American football player (born 1990)

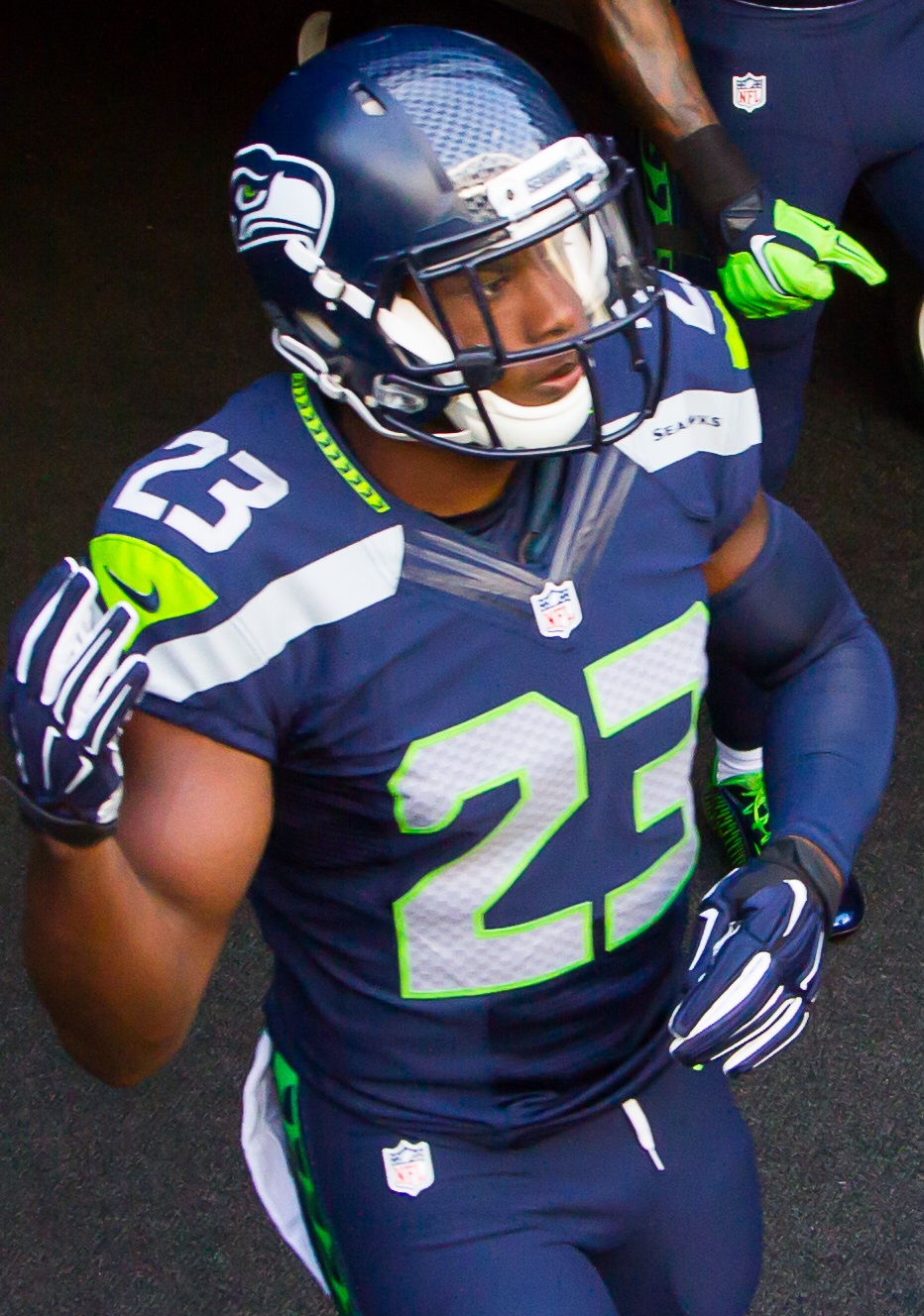
- Terrell with the Seattle Seahawks in 2015

No. 23
- Position: Safety

Personal information
- Born: September 21, 1990 (age 36); Dallas, Texas, U.S.
- Listed height: 5 ft 10 in (1.78 m)
- Listed weight: 197 lb (89 kg)

Career information
- High school: Allen (Allen, Texas)
- College: Texas A&M
- NFL draft: 2013: undrafted

Career history
- Jacksonville Jaguars (2013)*; Houston Texans (2013)*; Seattle Seahawks (2014–2016); Kansas City Chiefs (2017); Tennessee Titans (2018)*
- * Offseason or practice squad member only

Career NFL statistics
- Total tackles: 36
- Fumble recoveries: 1
- Pass deflections: 5
- Interceptions: 1
- Stats at Pro Football Reference

Steven Terrell (born September 21, 1990) is an American former professional football player who was a safety in the National Football League (NFL). He played college football for the Texas A&M Aggies and attended Allen High School in Allen, Texas. He was a member of the Jacksonville Jaguars, Houston Texans, Seattle Seahawks, Kansas City Chiefs, and Tennessee Titans.

== Early life ==
Terrell played high school football for the Allen High School Eagles. The Eagles won the 2008 5A Division I State Championship during his senior year. He was also named first-team All-State by the TSWA, All-State by the Associated Press, honorable mention Academic All-State (THSCA) and All-District (8-5A) at defensive back. He recorded 122 tackles, blocked five kicks, and intercepted two passes as a senior.

== College career ==
Terrell was a four-year letterman for the Texas A&M Aggies from 2009 to 2012. He played in 52 games, starting 24, during his college career while recording totals of 139 tackles, four interceptions, two forced fumbles, and one fumble recovery for the Aggies. He was a team captain his senior year in 2012. Terrell was also named first-team Academic All-Big 12 and first-team Academic All-Southeastern Conference. He graduated from Texas A&M with a bachelor's degree in Sports Management / Business Administration.

== Professional career ==
Terrell was signed by the Jacksonville Jaguars on May 3, 2013, after going undrafted in the 2013 NFL draft. He was released by the Jaguars on August 31, and signed to the team's practice squad on September 2. He was released by the Jaguars again on September 17, 2013.

On October 29, 2013, Terrell was signed to the practice squad of the Houston Texans. He signed a reserve/future contract with Houston on December 30, 2013, and was later waived on May 14, 2014.

Terrell was signed by the Seattle Seahawks on July 26, 2014. He was released by the Seahawks on August 30 and signed to the team's practice squad on August 31, 2014. He was promoted to the active roster on October 18, 2014. Terrell was active during the Seahawks' loss to the New England Patriots in Super Bowl XLIX. He played 11 snaps on special teams during the Super Bowl and posted one solo tackle.

On July 6, 2017, Terrell signed with the Kansas City Chiefs. He was released on September 2, and re-signed on September 9. He was placed on injured reserve on December 11, 2017, after suffering an injury while intercepting a pass from Derek Carr.

On August 10, 2018, Terrell signed with the Tennessee Titans. He was released on September 1, 2018.

== Personal life ==
Terrell became a realtor after his NFL career.
