= Levi Onwuzurike =

American football player (born 1998)

No. 95 – Detroit Lions
- Position: Defensive tackle
- Roster status: Active

Personal information
- Born: March 2, 1998 (age 28); Allen, Texas, U.S.
- Listed height: 6 ft 3 in (1.91 m)
- Listed weight: 304 lb (138 kg)

Career information
- High school: Allen
- College: Washington (2016–2020)
- NFL draft: 2021: 2nd round, 41st overall pick

Career history
- Detroit Lions (2021–present)

Awards and highlights
- First-team All-Pac-12 (2019)

Career NFL statistics as of Week 8, 2026
- Total tackles: 69
- Sacks: 3.5
- Forced fumbles: 1
- Pass deflections: 2
- Stats at Pro Football Reference

Levi Onwuzurike (born March 2, 1998) is an American professional football defensive tackle for the Detroit Lions of the National Football League (NFL). He played college football for the Washington Huskies, and was selected by the Lions in the second round of the 2021 NFL draft.

== Early life ==
Onwuzurike grew up in Allen, Texas, and attended Allen High School. As a senior, he was named the District 6-6A Defensive MVP and The Dallas Morning News All-Area Defensive Player of the Year after finishing the year with 53 tackles and 8.5 sacks. Onwuzurike committed to play college football at Washington over offers from Baylor, Arizona State and Michigan.

== College career ==
Onwuzurike redshirted his true freshman season. As a redshirt freshman, he recorded 16 tackles, 3.5 tackles for loss and two sacks. Onwuzurike played in all 14 of the Huskies games with four starts in his redshirt sophomore season and finished the year with 34 tackles, 6.5 tackles for loss and three sacks. He was named first-team All-Pac-12 Conference as a redshirt junior after recording 45 tackles, six tackles for loss, and two sacks with a blocked kick on special teams. In September 2020, Onwuzurike announced he was opting out of the season due to the COVID-19 pandemic and would prepare for the 2021 NFL draft.

== Professional career ==
Pre-draft measurables
Height	Weight	Arm length	Hand span	Wingspan	40-yard dash	10-yard split	20-yard split	Vertical jump	Broad jump	Bench press
6 ft 2 7/8 in (1.90 m)	290 lb (132 kg)	33 in (0.84 m)	10 1/8 in (0.26 m)	6 ft 7 1/4 in (2.01 m)	4.86 s	1.70 s	2.90 s	30.0 in (0.76 m)	9 ft 1 in (2.77 m)	29 reps
All values from Pro Day

Onwuzurike was selected 41st overall by the Detroit Lions in the second round of the 2021 NFL draft. He signed his four-year rookie contract on June 17, 2021, worth $8.14 million.

On September 10, 2022, Onwuzurike was placed on injured reserve with a back injury. During the Lions' bye week in week 6, Onwuzurike underwent season-ending back surgery.

In 2024 Onwuzurike recorded 28 tackles, 1.5 sacks and 1 forced fumble in 16 games with the Lions.

On March 12, 2025, Onwuzurike re-signed with the Lions on a one-year, $5.5 million contract. He was placed on the reserve/PUP list on July 17 to begin training camp. On July 20, it was announced that Onwuzurike would miss the entirety of the 2025 season due to a torn ACL.

On September 11, 2026, Onwuzurike was released by the Lions. The following day, he was re–signed to Detroit's practice squad. On September 17, he was signed to the active roster.

== Personal life ==
Onwuzurike's parents immigrated from Nigeria.
