= Allen Independent School District =

School district in Texas, United States

- Allen ISD's location in the DFW Metroplex

Location
- 612 E Bethany Rd. Allen, Texas ESC Region 10 USA
- Coordinates: 33°5′6″N 96°39′51″W

District information
- Type: Independent school district
- Motto: Where Eagles Soar!
- Grades: Pre-K through 12
- Superintendent: Robin Bullock, Acting Superintendent
- Schools: 23 (2019)
- NCES District ID: 4807890

Students and staff
- Students: 20,838 (2019)
- Teachers: 1,337 (2019) (on full-time equivalent (FTE) basis)
- Student–teacher ratio: 17 (2017)
- District mascot: Eagles

Other information
- Website: Allen ISD

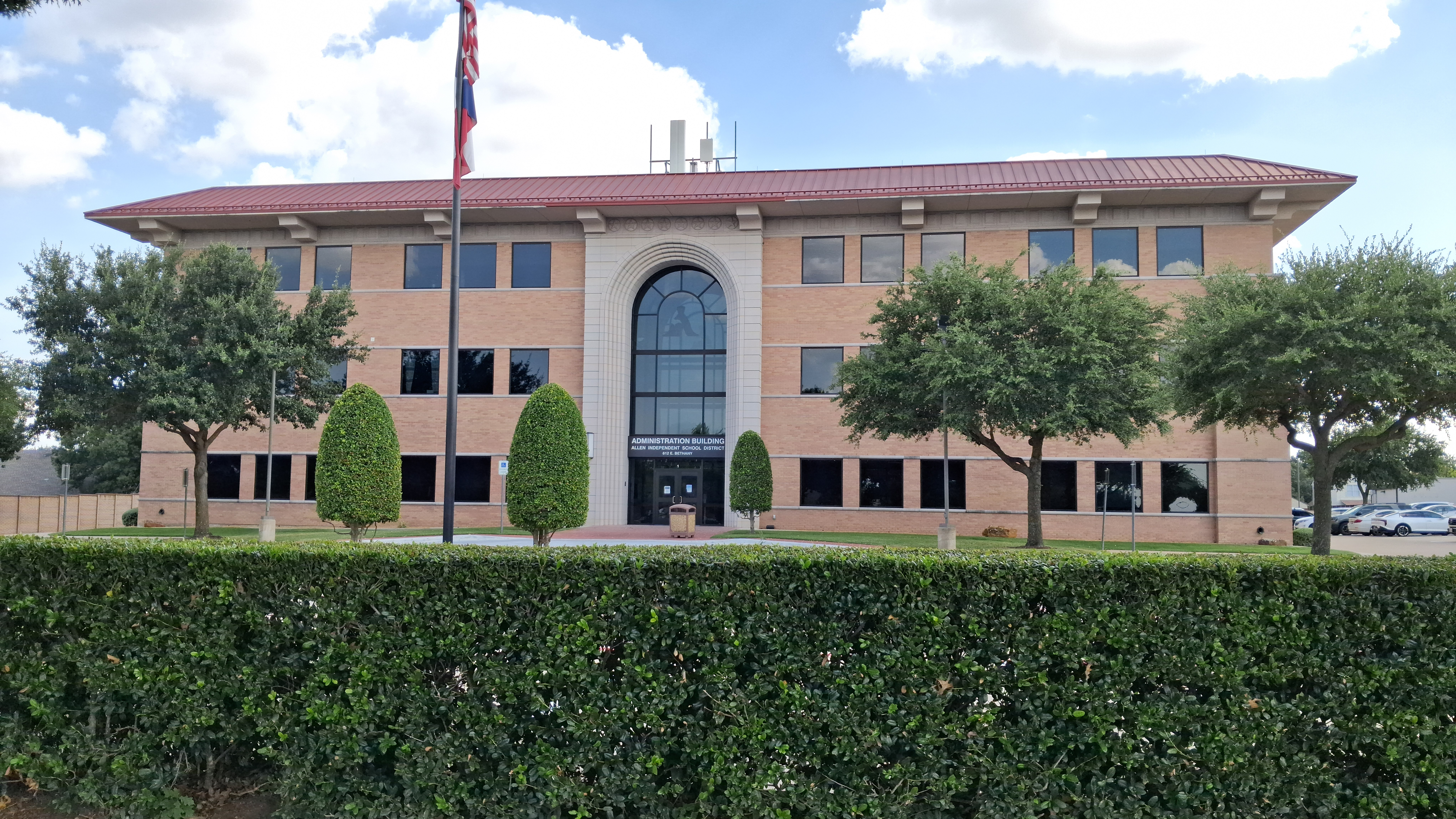
Administration

Allen Independent School District is a public school district based in Allen, Texas (USA). Allen ISD covers most of the city of Allen, as well as portions of the cities of McKinney, Plano, and Parker. The district has a total enrollment of 21,634 students, with an expected growth rate of 1–2% per year.

== Finances ==
As of the 2016–2017 school year, the appraised valuation of property in the district was $10,146,542,000. The maintenance tax rate was $1.14 and the bond tax rate was $0.45 per $100 of appraised valuation.

== Academic achievement ==
In 2011, the school district was rated "recognized" by the Texas Education Agency. Thirty-five percent of districts in Texas in 2011 received the same rating. No state accountability ratings will be given to districts in 2012. A school district in Texas can receive one of four possible rankings from the Texas Education Agency: Exemplary (the highest possible ranking), Recognized, Academically Acceptable, and Academically Unacceptable (the lowest possible ranking).

In 2013, the Texas Education Agency changed the rating system. A district can now get one out of four possible rankings: Met Standard, Met Alternative Standard, Improvement Required, and Not Rated.

Historical district TEA accountability ratings
| Year | Rating | Scores |
|---|---|---|
| 2025-26 | A | 90 |
| 2024-25 | A | 91 |
| 2023-24 | B | 89 |
| 2022-23 | B | 89 |
| 2021-22 | A | 94 |
| 2018 | Not Released | N/A |
| 2017 | Met Standard | N/A |
| 2016 | Met Standard | N/A |
| 2015 | Met Standard | N/A |
| 2014 | Met Standard | N/A |
| 2013 | Met Standard | N/A |
| 2012 | N/A | N/A |
| 2011 | Recongnized | N/A |
| 2010 | Exemplary | N/A |
| 2009 | Recongnized | N/A |
| 2008 | Recongnized | N/A |
| 2007 | Academically Acceptable | N/A |
| 2006 | Recongnized | N/A |
| 2005 | Academically Acceptable | N/A |
| 2004 | Academically Acceptable | N/A |

== Eagle Stadium ==
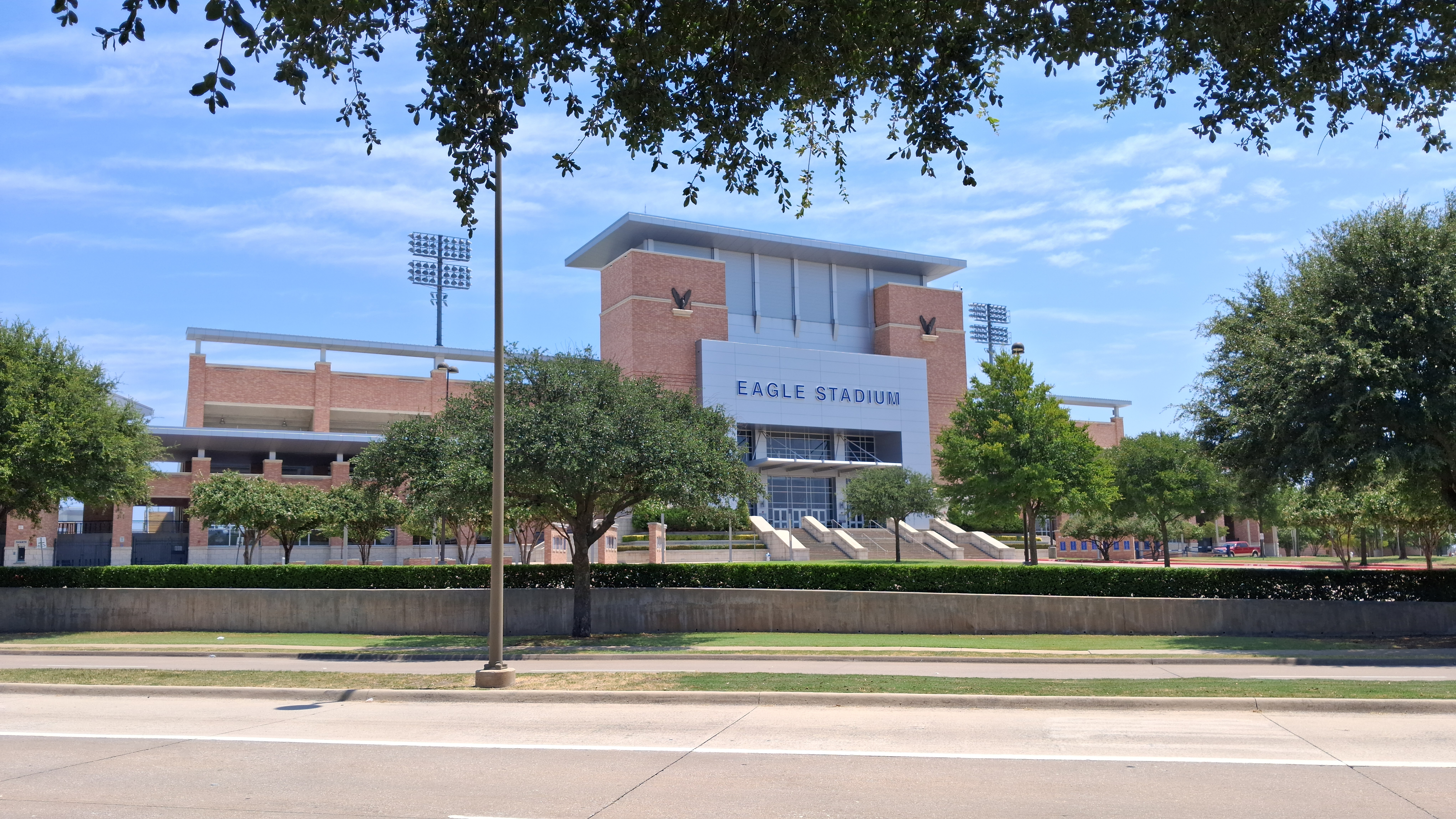
Eagle Stadium

Eagle Stadium it totall about 18,000 seats seating capacity. The score board 75 x 75, with a 38 x 23 HD Screen size. A parking lot space total of 5,034.

== Demographics ==
Allen ISD Ethnicity Data 2025–2026
| Ethnicity | Percent |
|---|---|
| White | 33.3% |
| Asian | 30.5% |
| Hispanic | 16.8% |
| African American | 12.5% |
| American Indian | 0.6% |
| Pacific Islander | 0.2% |
| Two or More Races | 0.6% |

== Schools ==
High Schools (9–12)
| School Name | Established | Mascot | Additional Information |
|---|---|---|---|
| Allen High School | 1910 | Eagles | New campuses constructed in 1956 and 1999. |
| Lowery Freshman Center | 1999 | Eagles | Serves grade 9; previously located in former 1956 AHS facility; new campus opened on same property in 2018. |

Middle Schools (7–8)
| School Name | Established | Mascot | Additional Information |
|---|---|---|---|
| Curtis Middle School | 1994 | Cougars | |
| Ereckson Middle School | 2004 | Huskies | |
| Ford Middle School | 1983 | Mustangs | |

Elementary Schools (K–6)
| School Name | Established | Mascot | Additional Information |
|---|---|---|---|
| Anderson Early Childhood School | 1997 | All-Stars | Opened as Anderson Elementary; converted to pre-K only in 2023 |
| Bolin Elementary | 1996 | Blazers | Located in Parker |
| Boon Elementery | 2005 | Patriots | |
| Boyd Elementery | 1978 | Blackhawks | |
| Chandler Elementary | 2006 | Cheetahs | |
| Cheatham Elementary | 2010 | Chargers | |
| Evans Elementary | 2008 | Express Riders | |
| Green Elementery | 1995 | Explorers | |
| Kerr Elementary | 2000 | Comets | |
| Lindsey Elementery | 2014 | Lone Stars | Located in McKinney |
| Marion Elementary | 2003 | Mavericks | |
| Norton Elementary | 2007 | Knights | |
| Olson Elementary | 2009 | Otters | |
| Preston Eelementary | 2006 | Pride | |
| Reed Elementary | 1981 | Owls | |
| Story Elementary | 1987 | Falcons | |
| Vaughan Elementary | 1989 | Vikings | |

Other Facilities
| Service Name | Established | Information |
|---|---|---|
| Dillard Special Achievement Center | 1999 | |
| Foundation For Allen Schools | 1997 | The program center for schools includes student scholarships, Educational Classroom Grants, Teacher Support, Recognition & Training. |
| STEAM Center | 2019 | Students learn science, technology, engineering, art, and math. |

== See also ==
- List of school districts in Texas
- List of high schools in Texas
