= George Benyola =

American football player (born 1964)

No. 3
- Position: Placekicker

Personal information
- Born: August 17, 1964 (age 62); Perth Amboy, New Jersey, U.S.
- Listed height: 5 ft 10 in (1.78 m)
- Listed weight: 195 lb (88 kg)

Career information
- High school: Allen (TX)
- College: Kilgore JC; Louisiana Tech
- NFL draft: 1986: undrafted

Career history
- New England Patriots (1986)*; New York Giants (1987); Detroit Lions (1988)*; Atlanta Falcons (1989)*
- * Offseason or practice squad member only

Career NFL statistics
- Field goals made: 5
- Field goal attempts: 3
- Field goal %: 60
- Longest field goal: 45
- Stats at Pro Football Reference

George J. Benyola (born September 17, 1964) is an American former professional football player who was a placekicker for one season with the New York Giants of the National Football League (NFL). He played college football for the Louisiana Tech Bulldogs, and was signed by the New England Patriots as an undrafted free agent in 1986.

== Early life and education ==
George Benyola was born on September 17, 1964, in Perth Amboy, New Jersey, but grew up in Texas. He attended Allen High School in Allen, Texas, and was one of the most highly recruited kickers in the state. After graduating, Benyola joined Kilgore Junior College. He played his first career college game against the Louisiana Tech JV squad, going four-for-five on field goal attempts in a win. By the end of the regular season, Benyola scored 54 points and was second in the conference. He also played punter, and made the conference's longest punt of the season with a 70-yard kick.

Starting his sophomore season, Benyola was named pre-season junior college All-American by the J. C. Grid-Wire. "The Toe", as he was nicknamed by teammates, was able to kick field goals up to 67 yards in practice, and set the Texas Junior College Football Conference all-time record with a 55-yard kick. Tony Benyola, his brother, claimed that the kick set a national junior college record, but the NJCAA said that field goal statistics were not recorded and therefore it was unofficial. His coach said, "If we can ever get the snaps back there more consistently, he can kick the ball and is gonna knock it through most of the time. We're very confident (of getting at least three points) anytime we get around the 35-yard line." Before Benyola lined up for a game-winning kick in week two of the season, coach Jim Miller was "already starting to jump in the air", because he "knew that Benyola was gonna knock it in there."

Controversy arose late in the season, when coach Miller reportedly "hindered George's hopes of kicking major college footballs by refusing to send game films to interested recruiters." "That's the biggest problem," said Benyola. "Florida State wanted to see film on me but he said it was too far away to send film. I told him I didn't understand that and he said, 'Well, I need all the film I can get.' I just don't understand him! Another problem is that he's never around. He's always gone. Oklahoma probably wants to see some film, but they can't catch him. Every time I'd talk to coach Miller I'd ask if any colleges had called and he said, 'No.' That's all he'd say."

He eventually accepted a scholarship offer from Louisiana Tech University, after a successful tryout. "I really liked the campus," he said. "I liked everything about Tech, so I decided it was the place for me." In a week two loss against Southwestern Louisiana, Benyola tied the school record for most field goals in a single game. He finished the season breaking the Louisiana Tech record for most single-season field goals with 16, and also tied the school's record for longest field goal with a 52-yarder.

During his senior year of 1985, Benyola also broke the all-time school record for most consecutive extra points made, and by mid-season was two field goals away from the record of most consecutive successful attempts. His coach at Louisiana Tech, A. L. Williams, said his kicking "gives you the chance to win almost any game. If we've done one thing wrong with him, we probably haven't used him enough." In a game against Lamar, he kicked two field goals, including a record 53-yarder, and was named conference player of the week. In his final career college game, he broke the all-time NCAA Division I-AA record for games with three field goals, despite just playing two seasons at that level.

== Professional career ==
After going unselected in the 1986 NFL draft, Benyola signed a contract as an undrafted free agent with the New England Patriots. He was released at roster cuts. Benyola was signed in 1987 by the New York Giants, but lost a training camp battle to Raul Allegre and was released. He was re-signed during the players strike, and made all three extra point attempts in his debut, a loss to the San Francisco 49ers. He attempted his first field goals in the next game, making both attempts. After only making one of three attempts in his next appearance, including two misses that could have won the game in a 3–6 loss against the Buffalo Bills, he was released. He finished his Giants career with three of five field goals made, and all three extra points attempts successful. He was signed by the Detroit Lions in 1988, but was one of the cuts in preseason. He made a final attempt at a comeback in 1989 with the Atlanta Falcons, but was waived in training camp.
