= Amanda Dunbar =

American painter

- Born: Amanda Dunbar; 1982 (age 43–44); Thunder Bay, Ontario, Canada
- Known for: Painting, oil painting, impressionism
- Awards: 2006 Induction to Texas Women's Hall of Fame, 2009 SMU Distinguished Alumni Award, (see below)

Amanda Dunbar (born 1982) is a Texas-based artist who gained acclaim at an early age for her oil painting skills. Amanda Dunbar began painting in an after school art class at the age of 13. Her spontaneous and advanced works acquired significant interest immediately. Dunbar is currently listed as a prodigy of the visual arts in the current textbooks for advanced university education entitled Child Psychology published by John Wiley & Sons Canada, Ltd.

== Early life and education ==
Amanda Dunbar was born in Thunder Bay, Ontario, Canada. She moved to Ottawa, Ontario, Canada, at the age of 4 and attended Orleans Wood Elementary School. Dunbar moved with her family to Allen, Texas. where she attended Ford Middle School and graduated from Allen High School in 2000.

At the end of the eighth grade she signed up for an after-school art class where the instructor asked the class to paint something – anything – so that he could gauge their skill level. Dunbar picked up a brush and created Mother's Touch, a portrait in the French impressionist style of a woman in a blue dress drying her small daughter after her bath. The impressed instructor quickly notified Dunbar's parents of her unusual skill. When she was young she liked many things such as cooking, drawing, acting, singing, etc. She never knew what she wanted to as she grew up. She thought she could be a nurse like her mother. But, she never thought that her career would be becoming an artist.

Dunbar graduated from Southern Methodist University in Dallas with a BFA in 2004. She graduated cum laude with departmental distinction. Dunbar was named State Artist of Texas in 2005. She went on to study abroad in France, Italy and Spain. She acquired a post baccalaureate certification at the Pont Aven School of Contemporary Art in 2006. In 2006 she also became the youngest honoree on record and is the only painter to date to be inducted into the Texas Women's Hall of Fame. She was 23 at the time and honored in the arts category. In 2009 Dunbar was awarded a Distinguished Alumni Award from Southern Methodist University for Emerging Leadership. Earlier in the year she was awarded the 2009 Americanism Medal by the Daughters of the American Revolution.

== Career ==
Dunbar began painting at the age of 13 and had a solo exhibition in Dallas, Texas, at the age of 16. Of the 68 paintings on display, most sold on the opening night with sales totaling over $500,000. The success of her showing prompted national media attention and she has been profiled since in numerous magazines and print media including People, Southern Living and ARTnews. She has appeared on TV shows including Oprah (twice). Dunbar publicly credits the talk show host for inspiring her business model and philanthropic goals particularly after she took over control of her studio art business from what she considered bad management at the age of 18.

At the age of 15, Dunbar made a decision to become an advocate for children's and artist's causes. She took part in a documentary entitled The Artist in Me that became a special feature on Mattel's Barbie as Rapunzel DVD, released in 2002 to inspire creativity among children. She also became an ambassador to the National Center for Missing & Exploited Children in 2004. Dunbar has donated to charities including the Grammy's MusiCares Foundation. ABC World News profiled the artist in 2007 as a "Person of the Week" when Charles Gibson discovered that she had quietly donated over a million dollars to various causes. Dunbar frequently speaks to youth, (girls in particular) and artists on a range of topics.

Dunbar is the founder and CEO of Dunbar Studios in Dallas. She is also the lead designer for the Precious Rebels line of art guitars. Her art guitars from the collection are among the most expensive guitars in the world. The collection is named as a subtle tribute to Oprah Winfrey.

Dunbar's art can be found in many private and corporate collections around the world.

== Television appearances ==
- The Oprah Winfrey Show, ABC
- The Early Show, CBS
- World News Tonight, ABC
- Good Morning Texas, ABC
- PBS
- CNN
- Designing Texas
- Dick Clark's The Other Half
- "Our Town Hero", CBS 11
- Soap Talk
- "The Spirit of Texas", News 8, ABC
- Living Large
- The Artist in Me short documentary by Mattel entertainment

== Honors and awards ==
- Southern Methodist University Distinguished Alumni Award: 2009
- Daughters of the American Revolution Americanism Medal: 2009
- Texas Women's Hall of Fame: 2006
- Ambassador to the National Center for Missing & Exploited Children

== Sources ==
- ABC Person of the Week: Amanda Dunbar (video)
- ABC Person of the Week: Amanda Dunbar (Article)
- Girardi, Laura C. (November 11, 2002). "Amanda Dunbar, painter". Time for Kids. (Archived from the original July 14, 2007.)
- Dunbar Becomes Ambassador to the National Center for Missing and Exploited Children
- Artist Amanda Dunbar Gives Back by Painting Guitar for Charity
- Dunbar on LA Artslant
- Dunbar Chosen for Miami GuitarTown Project
- MSNBC: Artist Creates Huge Guitar for Charity
- Artist's Guitar Used on Opening Nickelback Performance at the Juno Awards
- Amanda Dunbar the Prodigy
- Guided By Angels – Art Book * by Douglas Eby *
