= General Booty =

American football player (born 2002)

No. 14
- Position: Quarterback

Personal information
- Born: February 6, 2002 (age 24); Allen, Texas, U.S.
- Listed height: 6 ft 2 in (1.88 m)
- Listed weight: 195 lb (88 kg)

Career information
- High school: Allen
- College: Tyler Junior College (2021); Oklahoma (2022–2023); Louisiana–Monroe (2024)
- Stats at ESPN

General Axel Booty (born February 6, 2002) is an American former college football quarterback. He is the nephew of former National Football League (NFL) quarterback John David Booty and former NFL quarterback Josh Booty, who also played in Major League Baseball (MLB) for the Florida Marlins. He originally began his college career at Tyler Junior College in Tyler, Texas before transferring to the University of Oklahoma.

== Early life ==
Booty reportedly went to four different high schools, with two in California and two in Texas, before finishing his high school career in the Dallas area at Allen High School.

== College career ==
=== Tyler Junior College ===
Booty played and started all twelve games for Tyler Junior College; leading the team to a 7–5 record while throwing for 3,410 yards and 27 touchdowns.

=== Oklahoma ===
In May 2022, Booty announced that he would transfer to Oklahoma. Booty made two appearances for Oklahoma in his two-year tenure, recording no statistics in either game. On May 2, 2024, Booty entered the transfer portal.

=== Louisiana–Monroe ===
On May 15, 2024, Booty transferred to the University of Louisiana at Monroe.

On December 9, 2024, Booty announced that he would enter the transfer portal for the third time.
