= Allen High School (Texas) =

Public school in Texas, United States

Coordinates: 33.109223°N 96.660819°W

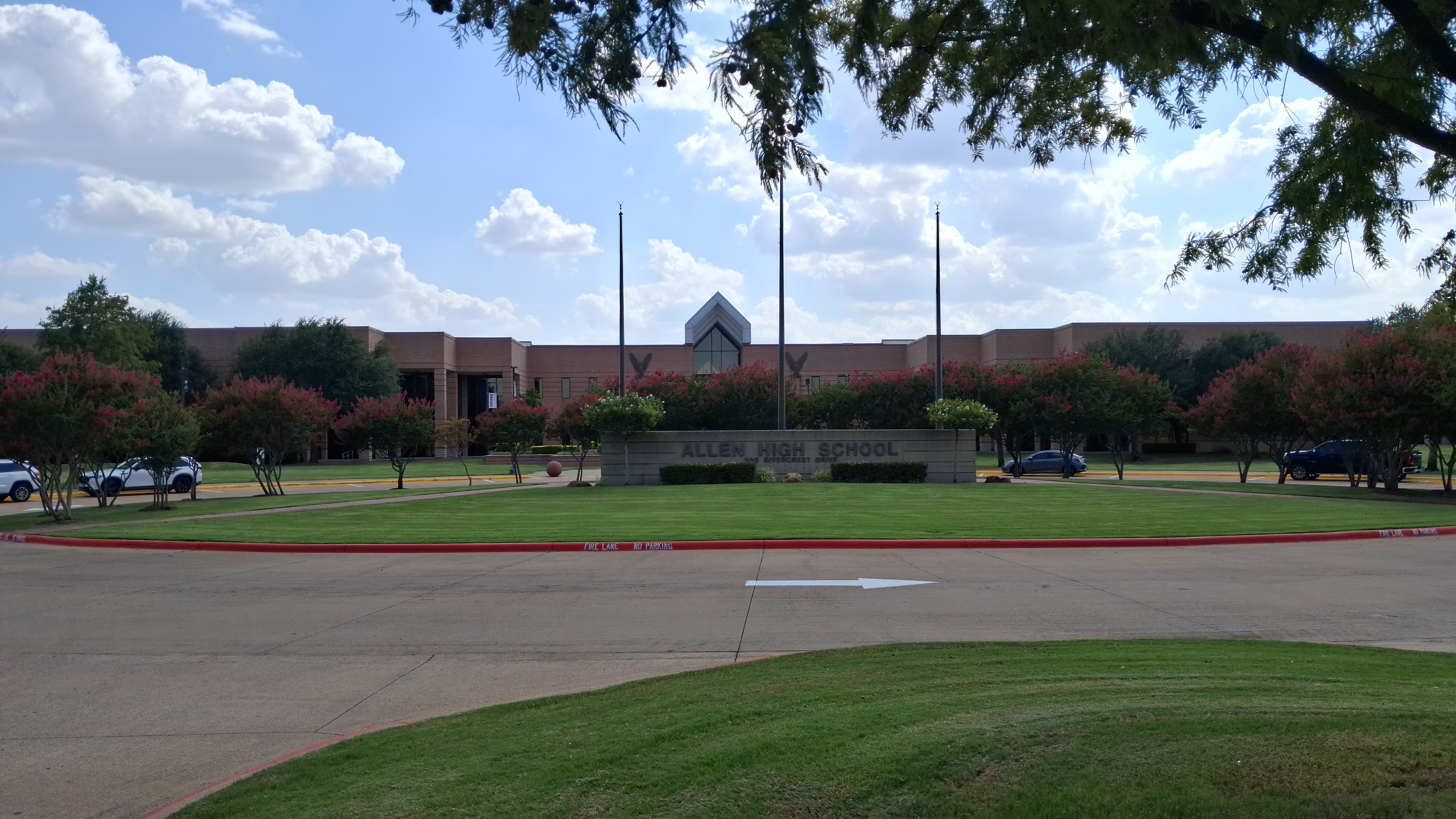

Location
- 300 Rivercrest Boulevard; Allen, Collin County, Texas 75002; United States

Information
- Type: Public, co-educational high school
- Motto: Home of the Allen Eagles
- Established: 1910
- School district: Allen Independent School District
- NCES District ID: 4807890
- Superintendent: Kim McLaughlin
- NCES School ID: 480789000117
- Principal: Carrie Jackson
- Teaching staff: Main: 275.85 (FTE) Freshman: 109.23 (FTE)
- Grades: Main: 9–12 Freshman: 9
- Enrollment: Main: 5,206 (2024–2025) Freshman: 1,674 (2024-25)
- Student to teacher ratio: Main: 19.81 Freshman: 15.33 (2024-25)
- Campus size: 177 acres (720,000 m^{2})
- Colors: Navy; White; Red
- Fight song: Across the Field
- Athletics: UIL Class 6A
- Mascot: American Bald Eagle
- Accreditation: Blue Ribbon 2001–02
- Website: Allen High School

Allen High School is a public, co-educational secondary school in Allen, Texas (United States). It is the only high school in the Allen Independent School District.

Allen High School serves most of the city of Allen. Until fall 2006, when Lovejoy High School opened, Allen High School served high school students in the Lovejoy Independent School District, which includes the city of Lucas, most of Fairview, a portion of Parker and a small portion of Plano.

== History ==
The first Allen High School, built in 1910 at the corner of Belmont and Cedar, was a two-story brick building housing six classrooms and an auditorium, and saw the first graduating class of eight students in 1914.

The second Allen High School was established in 1959 at the corner of Jupiter and Main Streets on land donated by Mr. Harris Brown.

In August 1999, Allen High School "2000," a new facility at the corner of Greenville and Rivercrest, opened to 2,200 students in grades 10 through 12. The former high school was converted into the Becky Lowery Freshman Center, named in honor of a former middle school teacher and school counselor. In 2018, the building was partly demolished and replaced with a new building on an adjacent plot of land on Greenville Avenue. The southernmost part of the school was renovated into the Dillard Special Achievement Center, while the northern section became a parking lot. The football stadium still stands. The new building became the Freshman Center and started serving grade 9 students during the 2018–19 school year. It had an enrollment of 1,634 in 2015–16.

A major expansion of the main high school campus was completed in 2011. This expansion included a new 1,500 seat performing arts center, an expansion of band hall space and a Career and Technology Education center featuring a student-managed restaurant open to the public, a student-managed apparel store with student-designed items, multiple new Mac labs, Mac-equipped rooms for the photojournalism, yearbook, commercial photography, audiovisual, radio, and newspaper classes as well as learning-classrooms for the medical education programs.

The final expansion was completed in 2018. This expansion included an auxiliary gymnasium and an expanded fine arts hallway. This expansion also included renovations to the gymnasium, cafeteria, library and academic-hallways, which include "huddle spaces" for collaborative learning. It also includes a food court with a Pizza Hut, Subway, and more.

== Location ==
- Freshman Center (9): 368 N Greenville Ave, Allen, TX 75002
- Main Campus (10–12): 300 Rivercrest Blvd. Allen, TX 75002
- CTE Campus (10–12) 1680 Ridgeview Dr, Allen, TX 75013

== Academics ==
Allen High School offers the International Baccalaureate program to its students, with the class of 2002 being the first to graduate Full Diploma. AHS also provides Advanced Placement, Dual Credit, and elective courses. AP course enrollment at AHS is 52%.

Allen uses a modified block schedule, utilizing five standard periods per day, with an alternating schedule of "A" and "B" days. The first and last period of the day (labeled as first and eighth periods) are the same both days and shorter than the others. The other 3 periods last about twice the time and alternate between A and B days, making a total of 8 periods per student. Additionally, AHS students are offered off-periods, known as "privilege periods" in which they do not have to attend any particular class. Sophomores are given one privilege period, while juniors and seniors are offered up to two.

Allen High School was named a 2001–02 National Blue Ribbon School and a 2004 TEA Pathfinder School. For the 2021–2022 school year, the school was given an "A" by the Texas Education Agency.

== STEAM Center ==
Allen High School features a Career and Technical Education (CTE) campus known as the STEAM Center, which opened in 2019 at a cost of $40 million. The 111,000-square-foot facility supports various CTE programs for the high school, and hosts educational field trips for elementary and middle school students. The STEAM Center can accommodate over 500 students simultaneously and includes a range of advanced amenities, such as an OmniGlobe, a large maker space, and a lake. Additionally, it features a dedicated K-8 center specifically designed for field trip activities. The STEAM Center operates on a schedule separate and independent from the main high school campus. Dual credit courses, in partnership with Collin College, moved from the main campus on Rivercrest to the CTE campus upon opening.

== Extracurricular activities ==
=== Athletics ===
As of 2021 Allen High has the largest University Interscholastic League (UIL) athletic program of any Texas high school.

Programs include:

- Archery
- Baseball
- Basketball
- Bowling
- Cheerleading
- Cross Country
- Drill team (dance team)
- Football
- Golf
- Hockey
- Lacrosse
- Marching Band
- Rugby
- Shooting sports
- Soccer
- Softball
- Spikeball
- Swimming
- Table tennis
- Tennis
- Track and field
- Volleyball
- Wrestling

==== Football ====
For over twenty-five years, the Allen Eagles football team has been one of the top high school football programs in Texas, qualifying for postseason play in every season since 1999. During this time, the team won five state championships (2008, 2012–2014, and 2017), appeared in ten semifinals (2003, 2006, 2008, 2012–2018), won 16 district titles in a row (2006–2021), and achieved a win-loss record of 234-28 from 2004 through 2022. Thirteen players from Allen have made their way to play professionally in the NFL.

Football Records Table
	State champion						
	State finalist						
	State final four						
	State quarterfinalist						
Season	Conf	Dist	Coach	Overall record	District record	Playoff record	UIL Ref
1936	C	3	Frank Smith (4–10)	2-4			
1937	C	3	Frank Smith (4–10)	0-5			
1938	C	10	Frank Smith (4–10)	2-0			
1939	C	10	Frank Smith (4–10)	0-1			
1940	6-Man	4	Jack Murray (10–0)	9-0			
1941	6-Man	4	Jack Murray (10–0)	1-0			
1942	6-Man	11	No season WW II				
1943	6-Man	11	No season WW II				
1944	6-Man	9	No season WW II				
1945	6-Man	9	W.H. Moseley (23–4)	0-1			
1946	6-Man	10	W.H. Moseley (23–4)	4-1		0-1	
1947	6-Man	10	W.H. Moseley (23–4)	4-1		0-1	
1948	6-Man	12	W.H. Moseley (23–4)	9-0		1-0	
1949	6-Man	12	W.H. Moseley (23–4)	6-1		0-1	
1950	6-Man	15	Gene Curtis (33–4–1)	9-1		0-1	
1951	6-Man	15	Gene Curtis (33–4–1)	7-1			
1952	6-Man	14	Gene Curtis (33–4–1)	8-1-1		0-1	
1953	6-Man	14	Gene Curtis (33–4–1)	9-1			
1954	6-Man	14	Lee Roundtree (14–6)	10-1		1-1	
1955	6-Man	14	Lee Roundtree (14–6)	4-5			
1956	6-Man	15	Max Vaughn (68–21–6)	7-2-1		0-1	
1957	6-Man	15	Max Vaughn (68–21–6)	7-2			
1958	8-Man	7	Max Vaughn (68–21–6)	10-0		1-0	
1959	8-Man	7	Max Vaughn (68–21–6)	10-0		1-0	
1960	8-Man	7	Max Vaughn (68–21–6)	12-0		2-0 (Note: Region 2 champion; no final championship game against Region 1 champion Jayton was played)	
1961	8-Man	7	Max Vaughn (68–21–6)	8-2-2			
1962	B	12	Max Vaughn (68–21–6)	9-2-1		1-1	
1963	B	12	Max Vaughn (68–21–6)	0-9-1			
1964	B	10	Max Vaughn (68–21–6)	5-4-1			
1965	B	10	Bob Painter (25–27)	6-5		0-1	
1966	B	9	Bob Painter (25–27)	4-6			
1967	B	9	Bob Painter (25–27)	3-7			
1968	B	12	Bob Painter (25–27)	5-5			
1969	B	12	Bob Painter (25–27)	7-4		0-1	
1970	1A	13	Pete Turman	1-9			
1971	1A	13	Jim Clark (23–16–3)	2-5-3			
1972	1A	16	Jim Clark (23–16–3)	6-4			
1973	1A	16	Jim Clark (23–16–3)	8-4		0-1	
1974	1A	15	Jim Clark (23–16–3)	7-3			
1975	1A	15	John Pearce (50–21–1)	6-4			
1976	2A	12	John Pearce (50–21–1)	6-4			
1977	2A	12	John Pearce (50–21–1)	2-8			
1978	2A	12	John Pearce (50–21–1)	8-2			
1979	2A	12	John Pearce (50–21–1)	9-1			
1980	3A	11	John Pearce (50–21–1)	11-1		1-1	
1981	3A	11	John Pearce (50–21–1)	8-1-1			
1982	4A	5	Ken Purcell (69–66–2)	6-4			
1983	4A	5	Ken Purcell (69–66–2)	10-1		0-1	
1984	4A	7	Ken Purcell (69–66–2)	1-9			
1985	4A	7	Ken Purcell (69–66–2)	3-7			
1986	4A	5	Ken Purcell (69–66–2)	10-3		1-1	
1987	4A	5	Ken Purcell (69–66–2)	10-3		1-1	
1988	4A	9	Ken Purcell (69–66–2)	6-4			
1989	4A	9	Ken Purcell (69–66–2)	5-5			
1990	4A	9	Ken Purcell (69–66–2)	6-4			
1991	4A	9	Ken Purcell (69–66–2)	3-6			
1992	5A	30	Ken Purcell (69–66–2)	5-5			
1993	5A	30	Ken Purcell (69–66–2)	2-7			
1994	5A I	5	Ken Purcell (69–66–2)	2-8			
1995	5A I	5	Todd Graham (35–30–1)	4-5-1			
1996	5A I	10	Todd Graham (35–30–1)	7-5		1-1	
1997	5A I	10	Todd Graham (35–30–1)	4-7		0-1	
1998	5A II	9	Todd Graham (35–30–1)	3-7			
1999	5A II	9	Todd Graham (35–30–1)	8-3		0-1	
2000	5A II	9	Todd Graham (35–30–1)	9-3		1-1	
2001	5A II	9	Joe Martin (31–9)	10-3		2-1	
2002	5A II	9	Joe Martin (31–9)	8-4		1-1	
2003	5A II	9	Joe Martin (31–9)	13-2		4-1	
2004	5A I	8	Tom Westerberg (150–17)	9-3	6-1	1-1	
2005	5A I	8	Tom Westerberg (150–17)	9-3	6-1	1-1	
2006	5A II	9	Tom Westerberg (150–17)	13-2	7-0	4-1	
2007	5A II	9	Tom Westerberg (150–17)	10-1	7-0	0-1	
2008	5A I	8	Tom Westerberg (150–17)	15-1	6-0	6-0	
2009	5A I	8	Tom Westerberg (150–17)	12-2	6-0	1-1	
2010	5A I	8	Tom Westerberg (150–17)	10-2	6-1	1-1	
2011	5A I	8	Tom Westerberg (150–17)	11-1	7-0	1-1	
2012	5A II	10	Tom Westerberg (150–17)	15-1	5-0	6-0	
2013	5A II	10	Tom Westerberg (150–17)	16-0	5-0	6-0	
2014	6A I	6	Tom Westerberg (150–17)	16-0	8-0	6-0	
2015	6A I	6	Tom Westerberg (150–17)	14-1	8-0	4-1	
2016	6A I	6	Terry Gambill (65–4)	14-1	7-0	4-1	
2017	6A I	6	Terry Gambill (65–4)	16-0	7-0	6-0	
2018	6A II	9	Terry Gambill (65–4)	14-1	7-0	4-1	
2019	6A II	9	Terry Gambill (65–4)	11-1	7-0	1-1	
2020	6A I	5	Terry Gambill (65–4)	10-1	6-0	2-1	
2021	6A I	5	Chad Morris	11-3	5-1	3-1	
2022	6A I	5	Lee Wiginton (29–10)	7-4	5-2	0-1	
2023	6A I	5	Lee Wiginton (29–10)	9-5	5-2	3-1	
2024	6A I	6	Lee Wiginton (29–10)	13-1	8-0	3-1	
2025	6A I	6	Lee Wiginton (29–10)	14-1	8-0	4-1	
2026	6A I	6	Lee Wiginton (29–10)				
Totals				655-258-13	142-8 (Note: District record since 2004. Research into prior records is ongoing.)	86-38	

==== Football stadium ====
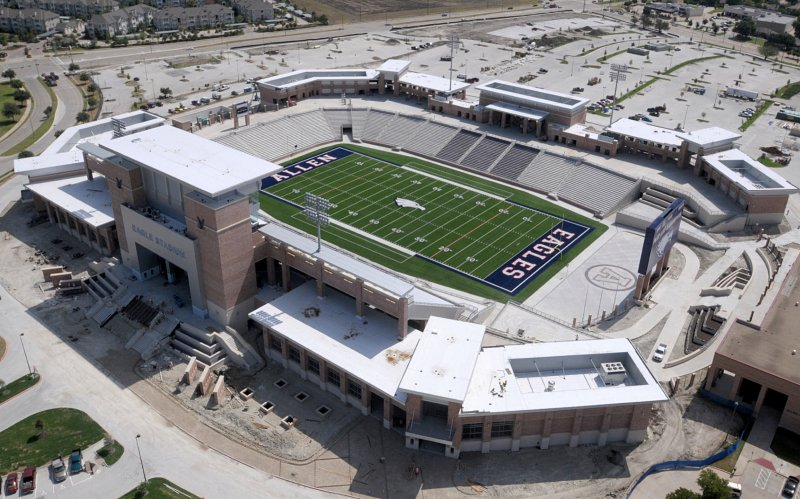
Eagle Stadium

Due to the program's popularity and student population, the school was authorized, via an approved April 2009 referendum, to build an 18,000-seat stadium for the team. The stadium cost nearly $60 million, and opened for the 2012 football season. It is the fifth largest high school stadium in the state, but the largest designed for the use of only one team. The facility houses a weight room, wrestling practice facility, and indoor golfing facility.

==== Basketball ====
- Boys
  - 2018 6A state champions

==== Girls golf ====
- State champions: 2005, 2006, 2012, 2014

==== Wrestling ====
- State champions
  - Boys team (14): 2009–2010, 2010–2011, 2011–2012, 2012-2013 5A, 2013-2014 5A, 2014-2015 6A, 2015-2016 6A, 2016-2017 6A, 2017-2018 6A, 2018-2019 6A, 2019-2020 6A, 2020-2021 6A, 2021-2022 6A, 2022-2023 6A
  - Boys individual (53): 2006-2007 (1), 2008-2009 (1), 2009-2010 (2), 2010-2011 (3), 2011-2012 (4), 2012-2013 5A (6), 2013-2014 5A (1), 2014-2015 6A (2), 2015-2016 6A (4), 2016-2017 6A (5), 2017-2018 6A (6), 2018-2019 6A (5), 2019-2020 6A (3), 2020-2021 6A (3), 2021-2022 6A (3), 2022-2023 6A (3), 2023-2024 6A (1)
  - Girls team (4): 2020-2021 6A, 2021-2022 6A, 2022-2023 6A, 2023-2024 6A
  - Girls individual (12): 2012-2013 5A (1), 2014-2015 6A (1), 2015-2016 6A (1), 2016-2017 6A (1), 2017-2018 6A (1), 2020-2021 6A (2), 2021-2022 6A (1), 2022-2023 6A (1), 2023-2024 6A (3)

==== Bowling ====
- State champions
  - Girls team (3): 2004, 2005, 2009
  - Girls individual (2): 2005, 2021
  - Boys team (3): 2002, 2008, 2015

==== Hockey ====
- State champions
  - 2006–07, 2008–09, 2016–17

==== Other sports ====
- 2014 - Texas Archery state champions
- 2015 - Texas Archery state champions
- 2014 - Scholastic Clay Target Program overall national champions

=== Band ===
The Allen Escadrille claims to be the country's largest high school marching band, with a membership of over 800 students. They perform at pre-game and halftime of all Allen varsity football games, participate in Texas UIL competitions, and perform in parades and at other venues. The band was invited to perform in the St. Patrick's Day Parade in Honolulu, Hawaii, in 2009, and performed in the 2006, 2016, 2026 Rose Parades in Pasadena, California. The band received the Sudler Shield Award from the John Philip Sousa Foundation in 2003. The band won the 4A State Marching Band Competition two years in a row, 1987 and 1988.

Notable performances:

- 1994 St. Patrick's Day Parade in Dublin, Ireland (the only high school band chosen to play at the Dublin Lord Mayors Ball)
- 1995 Texas Gubernatorial Parade
- 1997 Macy's Thanksgiving Day Parade in New York City
- 1999 Texas Gubernatorial Parade

=== Other programs ===
- 2011 - 1st place in Culinary at the Texas ProStart Competition in Austin, TX. 17th place at the National ProStart Competition.
- 2011 – Named a Grammy Signature Gold School, recognizing Allen as a U.S. public high school making an outstanding commitment to music education during an academic school year.
- 2011–2012 - Chorale Choir was invited to perform at the Texas Music Educators Association's annual convention. A recording of their performance was published on Spotify in 2012. The TMEA event invites by audition only the top 5 schools in the state.
- News Media - The broadcast program, KGLE 3 Teen News. Between 1996 and 2006, the program was awarded five first places, two-second places, and one-third place in Best of Shows at the National Scholastic Press Association's biannual competition. It has also been a four-time Pacemaker broadcast award winner (200, 2002, 2003, 2004). The KGLE program includes a radio broadcast.
- Orchestra - The orchestra was invited to perform at The International Midwest Clinic and Convention in 2006.
- Photography - Association of Texas Photography Instructors (ATPI) Top Program Contests
  - 2002 – 3rd place Photojournalism/Sports
  - 2003 – 2nd place Architecture
  - 2004 – 2nd place Architecture, Honorable Mention Sports
  - 2005 – 3rd place Landscape/Nature, Honorable Mention Sports and Architecture
  - 2006 – 1st place Top Award; 1st place in Architecture, Landscape, and Thematic categories, and 2nd place in portrait
  - 2007 – 5th Place Top Award; 1st place Thematic, 3rd place portrait, and Honorable Mention in Architecture and Landscape/Nature
  - 2008 – 2nd Place Architecture, 3rd Place Portrait, Honorable Mention Landscape/Nature
  - 2009 – 2nd Place Top Award; 1st Place Documentary/Photojournalism, 2nd Place Architecture, Portrait, and Thematic
  - 2010 – 1st Place Top Award (tie); 1st Place Landscape/Nature and Portrait, 2nd Place Documentary/Photojournalism and Still Life
  - 2011 – 2nd Place Top Award; 1st Place Portrait and Thematic, 3rd Place Still Life
  - 2012 – 3rd Place Top Award; 1st Place Landscape/Nature, 2nd Place Still Life, 3rd Place Architecture, Honorable Mention Portrait
  - 2013 – 2nd Place Top Award; 1st Place Architecture and Thematic, 2nd Place Landscape/Nature and Portrait
  - 2014 – 3rd Place Top Award; 1st Place Portrait, 3rd Place Architecture and Landscape/Nature, Honorable Mention Thematic
  - 2016 – 2nd Place Top Award; 1st Place Portrait, 2nd Place Still Life, 3rd Place Architecture and Landscape/Nature
  - 2017 – 3rd Place Top Award; 1st Place Still Life and Thematic, 3rd Place Architecture
  - 2018 – 2nd Place Commercial/Advertising, Honorable Mention Architecture and Portrait
  - 2019 – 3rd Place Top Award; 1st Place Commercial/Advertising, 2nd Place Thematic, 3rd Place Portrait
  - 2020 – 2nd Place Portrait and Thematic, 3rd Place Landscape/Nature
  - 2021 – 1st Place Landscape/Nature, 2nd Place Architecture
  - 2022 – 1st Place Architecture, 2nd Place Commercial/Advertising
- German folk dancing
  - First place in the 2005 state finals.
  - Third place in 2006 state finals.
- Rugby - 2011 Division 2 state runner-up at the Championship in Houston, Texas.
- UIL Academics Team
  - 2022 6A state runner-up
  - 2023 6A state champions
  - 2024 6A state runner-up

== Notable alumni ==
- Amy Aniobi (2002), writer, producer and director
- Laura Bailey (1999), voice actress
- Matt Barr (2002), actor
- George Benyola (1981), NFL kicker
- Quenlin Blackwell (2019), social media personality
- General Booty, (2021) college football quarterback for the Louisiana-Monroe Warhawks
- Dan Buckner (2008), former CFL wide receiver
- Amanda Dunbar (2000), artist
- Bobby Evans (2015), NFL offensive lineman and founder of Feed The Family Apparel
- A.J. Ferrari (2020), freestyle and folkstyle wrestler; NCAA wrestling champion
- Keith "Youngin" George II (2004), Technology app director and music executive
- Dawn Greathouse (1997), Soccer player and coach
- Bryson Green (2021), NFL wide receiver
- Jalen Guyton (2015), NFL wide receiver
- Jaylon Jones (2016), NFL cornerback
- Tejan Koroma (2014), NFL center
- Matt "Zyos" Leto (2002), retired professional Halo player and game designer
- Greg Little (2016), NFL offensive tackle
- Pat McCarty (2000), former professional cyclist
- Julie McCullough (1983), actress and stand-up comedian; former Playboy centerfold
- Kyler Murray (2015), NFL quarterback and 2018 Heisman Trophy winner
- Bo Nickal (2014), UFC fighter, freestyle and folkstyle wrestler; three-time NCAA wrestling champion
- Uzoma Nwachukwu (2009), former NFL wide receiver
- Cedric Ogbuehi (2010), NFL offensive tackle
- Levi Onwuzurike (2016), NFL defensive tackle
- Jim Parrack (1999), actor
- Carly Patterson (2006), former Olympic artistic gymnast; 2004 All-Around champion and member of the USA Gymnastics Hall of Fame
- August Ponthier (2015), musician
- Paul Russell (2015), musician
- Christian Sam (2014), NFL linebacker
- Will Sherman (2017), NFL offensive lineman
- Doug Skene (1988), NFL offensive lineman
- Isaiah Stevens (2019), NBA player
- Steven Terrell (2009), former NFL defensive back
- Shawn Tolleson (2006), MLB pitcher
- Jordyn Tyson (2022), NFL wide receiver
- J. D. Walton (2005), former NFL center
- Jonathan Williams (2012), NFL running back
