= Keith "Youngin" George II =

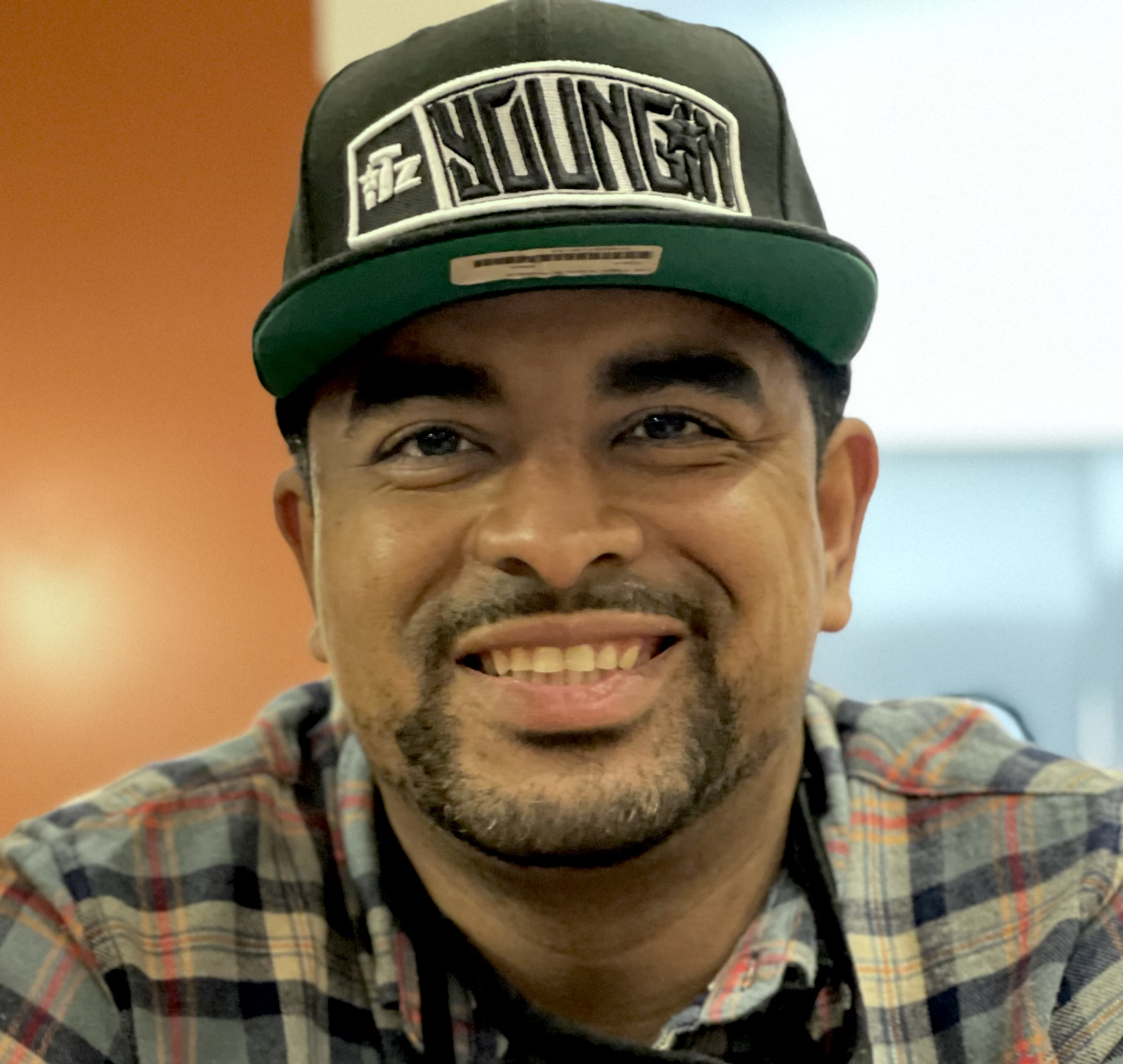
- George II in 2020
- Born: Keith Anthony George II; April 16, 1986 (age 40); Upper Heyford, Oxfordshire
- Other names: DJ Youngin Beatz; Youngin; Itz Youngin
- Occupations: App Developer; Mixtape DJ; Music Producer; Music Manager
- Years active: 2006–present
- Awards: Muse Award
- Musical career
- Genres: Hip-hop; R&B; Pop; Spoken Word
- Instrument: Keyboards
- Website: itzyoungin.com

Keith "Youngin" George II is a former mixtape DJ, music executive, manager, producer, and technology app director. He has collaborated with Maino, T-Pain, Nas and Soulja Boy, among others. He was instrumental in the launch of social media app and website, Kandiid in 2021 and served as Fliiks App Director of Regional Development.

== Career ==
Keith Anthony George II was born in Upper Heyford, Oxfordshire, England. His father was in the Air Force which exposed him to different cultures and music. He graduated from Allen High School and attended San Antonio College.

George's music career began in 2006 as a mixtape DJ working as DJ Youngin Beatz. He performed at various shows and worked with a variety of artists, managers, and music executives. In 2007, George released the mixtape, Untapped market Vol. 1 (Da Underdogz), which featured tracks from artists including Kanye West, Lil Wayne, 50 Cent, Yung Berg, and Nelly. In 2008, he began working with Def Jam executive Sarah Alminawi who was managing Maino at the time. George played a key role in the marketing and promotional success of Maino's single, Hi Hater, which peaked at #8 on Billboard's US Bubbling Under Hot 100 chart.

In 2021, George was an advisor and infrastructure head at Kandiid, a social media app which won a W3 Award in 2022. In 2023, he became involved with Fliiks App as Director of Regional Development which earned a Telly Award, two Muse Awards, and a W3 Award in 2025.

In 2025, George was a composer and producer on two singles on Sekou Andrews's album, Koumami; The Chosen One: ACT 1 (featuring Lion Babe) and Love Don't Care (featuring Jordin Sparks and Omari Hardwick). That same year, he was awarded an Atlanta City Proclamation for Philanthropy and Community Leadership for his partnership with Women's International Grail, a nonprofit organization that assists women, single mothers, and low-income families. He also collaborates with local youth programs, creative networks, and minority-owned startups, providing access to mentorship and industry knowledge.

In 2026, George facilitated the Texas recognition of Hip-Hop group Digital Underground for their contributions to hip-hop culture, along with Texas House of Representative Josey Garcia and the Alamo City Culture Collective at the San Antonio African American Community Archive Museum. That same year, the Keith George II Family Collection, a photo collection of prominent family members dating back to the 1800s, is archived at the San Antonio African American Community Archive and Museum (SAAACAM).

== Awards ==
Year	Nominated work	Category	Award	Result
2022	Kandiid App	Mobile Apps & Sites-Cultural	W3 Award	Won
2025	Fliiks	General Branding	Telly Awards	Won
2025	Fliiks	Mobile App - Business	Muse Award	Won
2025	Fliiks	Integrated Marketing - Company Branding	Muse Award	Won
2025	Fliiks	Mobile Features-Best Experimental & Innovation	W3 Award	Won
