= Dawn Greathouse =

American soccer player (born 1979)

Dawn Siergiej
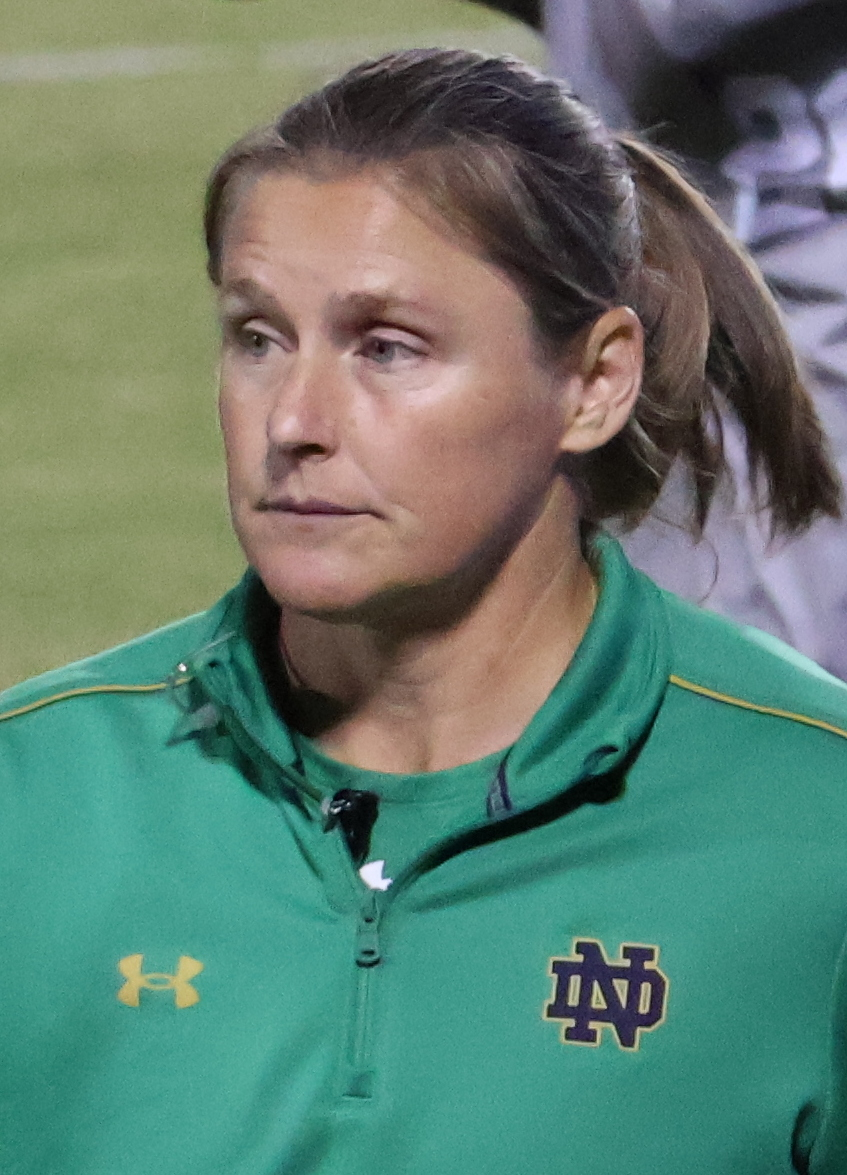
- Siergiej with Notre Dame in 2024

Personal information
- Birth name: Dawn Greathouse
- Date of birth: February 10, 1979 (age 47)
- Place of birth: Rochester, New York, United States
- Position: Goalkeeper

College career
Years	Team	Apps	(Gls)
1997–2000	Baylor Bears		(1)

Senior career*
Years	Team	Apps	(Gls)
2001–2002	Washington Freedom		
2002–2003	San Jose CyberRays	3	(0)

Managerial career
- 2003–: Notre Dame (assistant)
- * Club domestic league appearances and goals

Dawn Siergiej (née Greathouse; born February 10, 1979) is an American retired soccer player who is currently an assistant coach for the Notre Dame Fighting Irish women's soccer team. She played for the Washington Freedom and San Jose CyberRays.

== Early life and education ==
Siergiej was born in Rochester, New York on February 10, 1979, but grew up in Texas. She attended Allen High School and Baylor University. In 2001, she graduated with a Bachelor of Science in health fitness.

== Career ==
=== Athletics ===
While in high school, Siergiej trained with the United States women's national under-17 soccer team.

While studying at Baylor University, Siergiej played for the university's soccer team. In 1998, the team won the school's first Big 12 Conference championship and trained with the United States women's national under-20 soccer team. During her tenure, she was named Soccer Buzz National Defensive Player of the Year, an All-American player, and held university records for "every goalkeeper statistic".

Siergiej made her professional debut in the Women's United Soccer Association (WUSA) after being drafted in the second round to play for the Washington Freedom, where she remained for two years. In 2002, she transferred to the San Jose CyberRays. WUSA folded the following year.

While playing in the WUSA, she was also a back-up goalkeeper for the United States women's national soccer team.

=== Coaching ===
In 2003, began her career as an assistant soccer coach at the University of Notre Dame, where she remained in 2023. In that time, the team had participated in 16 championships, including National Collegiate Athletic Association (NCAA) titles in 2004 and 2010.

== Honors ==
In 2011, Siergiej was named in the Baylor Athletics Hall of Fame.

== Personal life ==
In May 2014, Siergiej married Nick Siergiej, Notre Dame's hockey team's coordinator of operations. As of 2021, they lived in South Bend, Indiana.
