= Greg Little (offensive lineman) =

American football player (born 1997)

Profile
- Position: Offensive tackle

Personal information
- Born: November 4, 1997 (age 29); Allen, Texas, U.S.
- Listed height: 6 ft 5 in (1.96 m)
- Listed weight: 310 lb (141 kg)

Career information
- High school: Allen (TX)
- College: Ole Miss (2016–2018)
- NFL draft: 2019: 2nd round, 37th overall pick

Career history
- Carolina Panthers (2019–2020); Miami Dolphins (2021–2022); Houston Texans (2023)*
- * Offseason or practice squad member only

Awards and highlights
- First-team All-SEC (2018); Second-team All-SEC (2017)

Career NFL statistics
- Games played: 31
- Games started: 13
- Stats at Pro Football Reference

Gregory Lamar Little (born November 4, 1997) is an American professional football offensive tackle. He played college football for the Ole Miss Rebels, and was selected by the Carolina Panthers in the second round of the 2019 NFL draft.

== Early life ==
A native of Allen, Texas, Little attended Allen High School, where he was a three-year starter on the offensive line. Blocking for quarterback Kyler Murray, Little helped Allen to back-to-back 16–0 seasons and 6A Division 1 UIL state championships in 2013 and 2014. In Little's senior season, Allen went undefeated again until they were upset by Sam Ehlinger's Austin Westlake team in the state championship semifinals.

Regarded as a five-star recruit, Little was ranked as the No. 2 prospect overall, behind Rashan Gary, in the class of 2016 by ESPN. After his junior season, Little verbally committed to Texas A&M, who had signed Murray, only to decommit a few days later. Little eventually chose Ole Miss over scholarship offers from Alabama, Auburn, Texas A&M, Louisiana State, and others.

== College career ==
In his true freshman year at Ole Miss, Little played in every game with five starts at left tackle, where he replaced Laremy Tunsil. On December 10, 2018, Little declared for the 2019 NFL draft.

== Professional career ==
Pre-draft measurables
Height	Weight	Arm length	Hand span	Wingspan	40-yard dash	10-yard split	20-yard split	20-yard shuttle	Three-cone drill	Vertical jump	Broad jump	Bench press
6 ft 5 1/4 in (1.96 m)	310 lb (141 kg)	35 1/4 in (0.90 m)	10 1/4 in (0.26 m)	7 ft 1 in (2.16 m)	5.33 s	1.83 s	3.07 s	4.74 s	8.19 s	29.0 in (0.74 m)	9 ft 5 in (2.87 m)	15 reps
All values from NFL Combine/Pro Day

=== Carolina Panthers ===
Little was selected by the Carolina Panthers in the second round with the 37th overall pick in the 2019 NFL draft. He played in four games, starting three at left tackle, before being placed on injured reserve on December 14, 2019. He was placed on the active/physically unable to perform list at the start of training camp on July 28, 2020, and was moved back to the active roster four days later. Little was placed on the reserve/COVID-19 list by the team on December 7, and activated two days later. In 2020, he started three games at left tackle before being placed on injured reserve on December 17.

=== Miami Dolphins ===
On August 17, 2021, Little was traded to the Miami Dolphins for a 2022 NFL draft seventh-round pick (No. 242: Kalon Barnes). He was placed on injured reserve on November 17.

Entering the 2022 season, Little was listed as Austin Jackson's backup at right tackle. However, with Jackson ruled out for the Dolphins' second game of the season (against the Baltimore Ravens), Little was called into the starting lineup and excelled in a record-breaking fourth-quarter comeback win for Miami. After teammates had struggled in the previous few games at left tackle, Little was moved to left tackle for the Dolphins' Week 6 game against the Minnesota Vikings. However, he received plenty of criticism after giving up a 15.7% pressure rate. This performance earned Little a PFF pass blocking grade of just 1.5 out of a scale of 0-100.

=== Houston Texans ===
On May 4, 2023, Little signed with the Houston Texans. He was placed on injured reserve on August 7, and released on August 15.
