= Crawford & Company =

American insurance claims management company

- Company type: Public
- Traded as: NYSE: CRD.A (Class A); NYSE: CRD.B (Class B); Russell 2000 Index component (CRD.A)
- Industry: Claims Management
- Founded: 1941; 85 years ago
- Founder: Jim Crawford
- Headquarters: Atlanta, Georgia, United States
- Area served: North America, South America, United Kingdom, Europe, Middle East, and Asia–Pacific
- Key people: W. Bruce Swain, Jr., (CEO)
- Revenue: ▼$1.07 billion (2018)
- Net income: ▼$26 million (2018)
- Number of employees: 9,000+ (2019)

Crawford & Company is a claims management company with more than 700 offices in 70 countries.

== Overview ==
Crawford & Company is one of the world's largest independent providers of claims management to the risk management and insurance industry as well as self-insured entities. The company is based in Atlanta, Georgia with clients in more than 70 countries. Jim Crawford, formerly an insurance company claims manager, founded Crawford & Company in 1941. After opening the first Crawford office in Columbus, Georgia on May 27, 1941, he expanded operations across the United States. These offices handled casualty and workers' compensation claims for all major insurance carriers. By 1967, Crawford & Company had offices in Canada, Puerto Rico, England, and the United States.

In 1968, Crawford became a publicly traded company. In 1971, a new 24/7 claims referral service called MAYDAY was introduced (now called Crawford Claims Alert). Around the same time, Crawford introduced 3 new services: Rehabilitation Services, Risk Management Services, and Catastrophe Services.

The company's shares are traded on the NYSE under the symbols CRD-A and CRD-B.
