= Tioga High School (Texas) =

Public high school in Tioga, Texas

Location
- 855 Mc Knight Rd; Tioga, Texas 76271; United States
- Coordinates: 33.4824°N 96.9078°W

Information
- Type: Public High School
- School district: Tioga Independent School District
- Teaching staff: 47.09 (FTE)
- Grades: K-12
- Enrollment: 688 (2023–2024)
- Student to teacher ratio: 14.61
- Colors: Green and white
- Mascot: Bulldogs

Tioga High School is a senior high school in Tioga, Texas and a part of the Tioga Independent School District.

== History ==
It is currently unknown when Tioga High School originally opened but it is known to be closed in 1961. making Tioga ISD a Pre-Kindergarten through 8th grade district. Students in grades nine through twelve attended Gunter High School in the Gunter Independent School District.

However, beginning with the 2012–2013 school year, the District began its own high school, starting with the 9th grade and adding one grade each year until all 12 grades were served in the 2015–2016 school year. At one time the district considered consolidating with another school district. Instead it opted to re-establish its high school.

Previously all grades of Tioga ISD were in the same building but it planned to establish a 62,000-square-foot (5,800 m^{2}) high school building and track. VLK Architects, a company in Fort Worth, Texas, is designing the building. In July 2016 the district voters approved a lease-purchase agreement to buy land for the high school. Groundbreaking occurred in December 2016.

== Athletics ==
The Tioga Bulldogs compete in the following sports: Cross Country, Volleyball, Football, Basketball, Powerlifting, Baseball, Softball, Track and Field, Tennis and Golf.

=== State Titles ===
- Boys Track and Field
  - 2026(2A)
