= U.S. Route 377 =

Auxiliary U.S. Highway in Texas and Oklahoma in the United States

U.S. Route 377
- US 377 highlighted in red

Route information
- Auxiliary route of US 77
- Length: 478 mi (769 km)
- Existed: 1930–present

Major junctions
- South end: US 90 / US 277 in Del Rio, TX
- I-10 / US 83 in Junction, TX; I-20 / I-820 in Benbrook, TX; I-30 / I-35W / US 287 in Fort Worth, TX; I-35E in Denton, TX; I-40 near Seminole, OK
- North end: I-44 / SH-99 at Stroud, OK

Location
- Country: United States
- States: Texas, Oklahoma

Highway system
- United States Numbered Highway System; List; Special; Divided

U.S. Route 377 (US 377) is a 478-mile-long (769 km) north–south United States highway. Originally formed as a short spur to connect Denton and Fort Worth, Texas; it has since been extended southward toward Del Rio, Texas near the U.S. border with Mexico, and northward into Oklahoma.

== Route description ==
=== Texas ===
The southern terminus is in Del Rio, Texas at an intersection with U.S. Route 90. It goes north of town co-signed with U.S. Route 277 for 20 miles (32 km). After splitting off, it enters Edwards County and Carta Valley. It meets SH 55 at the county seat, Rocksprings, before serving as the western terminus of SH 41. About 20 miles north of Rocksprings, the route meets with the headwaters of the South Llano River, which follows the route into Junction, Texas. It heads northeast into Kimble County, crossing the county line near Telegraph. At Junction, it meets both Interstate 10 and US 83. It then continues northeast through London, extreme southeastern Menard County, and Mason County. In Mason County, US 377 passes through Streeter before forming a concurrency with SH 29 near Grit. In Mason, SH 29 splits off to its own alignment while US 377 turns north to join U.S. Route 87.

US 87/377 head north together into Brady, where they meet US 190, the southern terminus of US 283, and SH 71. US 377 splits off to the north and heads to Mercury and crosses the Colorado River near Winchell. In Brownwood, US 377 joins with U.S. Route 67, following its routing all the way to Stephenville, where US 377 splits off on its own again. US 377 then enters Hood County, where it passes through the county seat, Granbury. It cuts the corners of both Johnson County and Parker County before entering Tarrant County and the Dallas-Fort Worth Metroplex.

US 377 crosses Interstate 20 at exit 429A in Benbrook. It then enters Fort Worth proper, meeting SH 183 and Spur 580. It runs northeast on Camp Bowie Blvd. to Interstate 30, which it begins a concurrency with. At the Interstate 35W junction, it heads north along that highway before splitting off at Exit 52A (Belknap St.). It heads due north at the Denton Highway and continues to run parallel to I-35W through many Fort Worth suburbs, including Haltom City, Watauga, Keller, Westlake, Roanoke, and Argyle.

In Denton, it joins Interstate 35E via a "wrong-way" concurrency to Loop 288 (as of January 2025), then has a concurrency with Loop 288 before joining US 380 through the eastern portion of Denton into Crossroads; US 377 had previously crossed I-35E before its concurrency with US 380 north of Downtown Denton..

After splitting from US 380, US 377 runs through Crossroads and north into Krugerville. It continues through Aubrey, through Pilot Point, Tioga, and Collinsville, before having an interchange with US 82 at Whitesboro. It the heads north to cross Lake Texoma (the Red River) into Oklahoma.

=== Oklahoma ===
US 377 is co-signed with State Highway 99 for its entire Oklahoma length. US 377's first junction within Oklahoma is with SH-32 west of Kingston. The first town that US 377/SH-99 pass through is Madill, where the two highways meet US 70 and State Highway 199. The next town after that is Tishomingo, where there is a brief concurrency with SH-22. US 377/SH-99 run north from Tishomingo, having a one-mile (1.6 km) three-route concurrency with SH-7 before meeting State Highway 3 southeast of Ada. US 377/SH-99 run around the east and north sides of town. On the north side of Ada, SH-3E joins the concurrency.

After leaving Ada, US 377/SH-3E/99 pass through Byng. The three highways cross the Canadian River just south of a junction that serves as the eastern terminus of SH-39 and the western terminus of SH-56. North of Bowlegs, SH-59 joins with the other routes briefly. The next major town is Seminole, where the highways meet SH-9, and SH-3E splits off. US 377/SH-99 cross I-40 at Exit 200. The highways have a junction with US 62 in Prague.

As of 2007, the highway's northern terminus is in Stroud, Oklahoma at an indeterminate point somewhere between old Route 66 (now Oklahoma State Highway 66) and modern Interstate 44. SH-99 continues north into Kansas.

== History ==
=== U.S. 377 in Texas ===
When US 377 was commissioned in 1930, US 77 connected Dallas, Texas, with the north and south, but nearby Fort Worth lacked a direct northern connection. US 377 formed a short (less than 40-mile [65 km]) connection between US 77 in Denton and US 81 in Fort Worth. Along with a section of US 81, it provided a parallel north–south route to US 77 between Denton and Hillsboro, where US 81 met US 77. When the Interstate Highway System was built, I-35 included a similar Dallas–Fort Worth split with routes I-35E through Dallas (along US 77) and I-35W through Fort Worth (along to US 377 and US 81).

In 1931, US 377 was extended to southwest from Fort Worth to Stephenville, and in 1951, it was extended south from Stephenville to its current terminus in Del Rio.

The section of US 377 in Texas north of Denton was signed as SH 10 until 1960 and SH 99 from 1960 until 1968. The American Association of State Highway Officials (AASHO, later the American Association of State Highway and Transpiration Officiations, AASHTO), the body which coordinates the numbering of U.S. Highways, approved an extension of US 377 from Denton into Oklahoma in 1968 and signs went up for this section in 1969.

The Texas Transportation Commission re-routed US 377 out of Downtown Denton via a wrong-way concurrency with I-35E/US 77 between Fort Worth Drive and the southern terminus of Loop 288, then via Loop 288 to US 380 to the northeast of Downtown Denton on January 30, 2025.

US 377 long remained a two-lane highway between Denton and Fort Worth, but has since been widened with more construction scheduled. North of Denton, US 377 is currently two lanes.

=== U.S. 377 in Oklahoma ===
US 377 in Oklahoma was predated by Oklahoma State Highway 99, with which it still runs concurrently. The Oklahoma Department of Highways had proposed portions of SH-99 for inclusion in the United States Numbered Highway System several times. One such application made in 1953 suggested that the entirety of SH-99 become a U.S. Route, while another suggested a northern terminus at US 64 near Cleveland. On June 18, 1964, AASHO accepted an extension of US 377 from the Texas state line, but only 17 miles (25 km) to US 70 in Madill. This extension was not marked on Oklahoma official state highway maps. (Note: Maps from 1968 to 1988 do not show US 377 in Oklahoma, though they do show US 377 south of the Texas state line beginning in 1975.)

The Department of Highways, and later the Department of Transportation, submitted applications to extend US 377 from Madill to US 64 in Cleveland eight times between December 1964 and 1980, all of which were rejected for unknown reasons. In 1988, ODOT began signing US 377 from Madill to Stroud along SH-99 without AASHTO approval.

The Willis Bridge crossing Lake Texoma on the Red River was constructed in 1960. By the late 2010s, it had guardrail damage causing the remaining bridge to be very narrow and was considered structurally deficient. Parts of the bridge had collapsed. An original estimated start for replacement bridge was February 2018, costing $80 million. In November 2018, the Oklahoma Transportation Commission awarded a $43 million contract to replace the bridge with a new two-lane bridge which started construction in early January 2019. The bridge, funded by both Oklahoma and Texas, was completed in February 2023 after which the old bridge was demolished.

== Future ==
The US 377 Cresson Relief Route is a four-lane freeway bypass of Cresson and an at-grade railway crossing that is currently under construction and planned to open in late 2025. The project, originally planned to be opened to traffic in 2022, has faced multiple delays.

== Major intersections ==
State	County	Location	mi	km	Destinations	Notes
Texas	Val Verde	Del Rio	0.0	0.0	US 90 east / US 277 south / Spur 239 south (East Gibbs Street) / Spur 297 south (Veteran's Boulevard) – Laughlin AFB, Brackettville, Eagle Pass, Ciudad Acuña, Business District	Southern terminus; south end of US 90/US 277 overlap
Texas	Val Verde		4.4	7.1	US 90 west – Comstock, Amistad NRA Visitor Information, Big Bend National Park	North end of US 90 overlap
Texas	Val Verde		5.5	8.9	Loop 79 to US 90 – Eagle Pass, Laredo	Interchange
Texas	Val Verde		17.6	28.3	RE 2 west – Amistad National Recreation Area, Rough Canyon	
Texas	Val Verde		26.6	42.8	US 277 north – Sonora	North end of US 277 concurrency
Texas	Edwards		40.8	65.7	RM 2523 south to US 90	
Texas	Edwards		72.6	116.8	RM 674 south – Brackettville, Kickapoo State Park	
Texas	Edwards	Rocksprings	75.7	121.8	SH 55 north – Sonora	South end of SH 55 concurrency
Texas	Edwards	Rocksprings	76.2	122.6	SH 55 south – Uvalde	North end of SH 55 concurrency
Texas	Edwards		78.1	125.7	RM 2630 north	
Texas	Edwards		84.2	135.5	SH 41 east – Mountain Home	
Texas	Kimble		118.6	190.9	PR 73 – South Llano River State Park, Walter Buck WMA	
Texas	Kimble	Junction	122.1	196.5	FM 2169 east (Flatrock Lane) – Texas Tech University at Junction	
Texas	Kimble	Junction	122.9	197.8	Loop 481 east (Main Street) – Kerrville	
Texas	Kimble	Junction	124.2	199.9	RM 1674 west	
Texas	Kimble	Junction	124.5	200.4	I-10 / US 83 south – Fort Stockton, Uvalde, San Antonio, Sonora	South end of US 83 concurrency; I-10 exit 456
Texas	Kimble		125.4	201.8	US 83 north – Menard	North end of US 83 concurrency
Texas	Kimble		136.0	218.9	FM 3480 east to RM 385	
Texas	Kimble		139.5	224.5	RM 385 south to US 290	
Texas	Kimble		143.9	231.6	RM 1221 north – Hext	
Texas	Menard	No major junctions				
Texas	Mason	Grit	161.7	260.2	SH 29 west – Menard	South end of SH 29 overlap
Texas	Mason		165.9	267.0	US 87 south / SH 29 east – Llano, Mason	North end of SH 29 overlap; south end of US 87 overlap
Texas	see US 87					
Texas	McCulloch	Brady	193.2	310.9	US 87 north to US 283 – San Angelo	North end of US 87 concurrency
Texas	McCulloch	Brady	193.3	311.1	FM 714 east (East Main Street)	
Texas	McCulloch	Brady	194.1	312.4	US 190 east – Rochelle, San Saba	North end of US 190 concurrency
Texas	McCulloch	Brady	194.7	313.3	FM 2996 north	
Texas	McCulloch		199.3	320.7	FM 1121 west	South end of FM 1121 overlap
Texas	McCulloch		200.3	322.4	FM 1121 east – Rochelle	North end of FM 1121 overlap
Texas	McCulloch		207.7	334.3	FM 1028 north	
Texas	McCulloch		215.8	347.3	FM 502 east	
Texas	McCulloch		216.5	348.4	FM 765 west	South end of FM 765 overlap
Texas	McCulloch		216.7	348.7	FM 765 east to FM 45 – Elm Grove	North end of FM 765 overlap
Texas	Brown	Dulin	224.8	361.8	FM 586 north – Brookesmith, Trickham	South end of FM 586 overlap
Texas	Brown		225.9	363.6	FM 586 south	North end of FM 586 overlap
Texas	Brown		233.8	376.3	FM 1176 north – Trickham	
Texas	Brown		235.8	379.5	FM 45 south – Richland Springs, T.R. Havins Unit, Gordon Wood Stadium	
Texas	Brown		236.8	381.1	FM 3064 east (Morris Sheppard Drive) – Gordon Wood Stadium	Access to Hendrick Medical Center Brownwood
Texas	Brown	Brownwood	239.2	385.0	Fisk Street / Carnegie Street / Coleman Avenue	Interchange
Texas	Brown	Brownwood	240.0	386.2	FM 2524 (Austin Avenue) – Downtown Historic Area, Howard Payne University	
Texas	Brown	Brownwood	240.8	387.5	US 67 south / US 84 west (West Commerce Street) to SH 279 – Coleman	South end of US 67 / US 84 concurrency
Texas	see US 67					
Texas	Erath	Stephenville	301.6	485.4	US 67 north – Glen Rose	North end of US 67 concurrency
Texas	Erath	Stephenville	302.0	486.0	US 281 – Mineral Wells, Hico, Airport	
Texas	Erath	Stephenville	302.4	486.7	FM 205 – Cedar Point	
Texas	Erath		304.0	489.2	Bus. US 377 south – Stephenville	
Texas	Erath		314.5	506.1	FM 1188 west – Morgan Mill	
Texas	Erath	Bluff Dale	316.1	508.7	FM 2481 south	
Texas	Hood		322.2	518.5	FM 2870 south (Rock Church Highway)	
Texas	Hood	Tolar	322.9	519.7	FM 56 north (Tolar Highway)	South end of FM 56 overlap
Texas	Hood	Tolar	323.2	520.1	FM 56 south – Glen Rose	North end of FM 56 overlap
Texas	Hood	Granbury	329.1	529.6	Loop 567 north – Weatherford	
Texas	Hood	Granbury	329.8	530.8	Bus. US 377 north – Granbury, Historical District, Airport	
Texas	Hood	Granbury	330.9	532.5	SH 144 – Granbury, Glen Rose	Interchange
Texas	Hood	Granbury	333.2	536.2	Bus. US 377 south / FM 4 north – Granbury, Historical District	Interchange; south end of FM 4 overlap
Texas	Hood	Granbury	335.3	539.6	FM 4 south – Acton	North end of FM 4 overlap
Texas	Hood	Granbury	336.4	541.4	FM 167 north	South end of FM 167 overlap
Texas	Hood	Granbury	337.5	543.2	FM 167 south – Acton, Camp El Tesoro	North end of FM 167 overlap
Texas	Hood	Cresson			Bus. US 377 north to SH 171 – Cresson	Interchange under construction
Texas	Hood	Cresson	343.9	553.5	SH 171 – Weatherford, Cleburne	
Texas	Johnson	Cresson			Bus. US 377 south to SH 171 – Cresson	Interchange under construction
Texas	Parker	No major junctions				
Texas	Tarrant	Wheatland	352.1	566.7	FM 1187 east – Crowley	South end of FM 1187 overlap
Texas	Tarrant		352.6	567.5	FM 1187 west	North end of FM 1187 overlap
Texas	Tarrant	Benbrook	356.2	573.2	RM 2871 west	
Texas	Tarrant	Benbrook	358.4– 358.5	576.8– 576.9	I-20 / I-820 north	I-20 exit 429A
Texas	Tarrant	Fort Worth	360.8– 361.0	580.7– 581.0	SH 183 (Alta Mere Drive / Southwest Boulevard) to Spur 580	traffic circle
Texas	Tarrant	Fort Worth	361.7	582.1	Spur 580 west (Camp Bowie West Boulevard) to SH 183	No left turn northbound
Texas	Tarrant	Fort Worth	361.7	582.1	Camp Bowie Boulevard	Interchange; northbound exit and southbound entrance; Spur 580 is former US 80
Texas	Tarrant	Fort Worth	363.9	585.6	I-30 west – Abilene	Southbound exit and northbound entrance; south end of I-30 overlap; US 377 south follows exit 9Bl
Texas	Tarrant	Fort Worth	see I-30			
Texas	Tarrant	Fort Worth	368.1– 368.3	592.4– 592.7	I-30 east / I-35W south / US 287 south / SH 180 east (East Lancaster Street) – Dallas, Waco	North end of I-30 overlap; south end of I-35W / US 287 overlap; US 377 north follows exit 15A; US 377 south follows exit 51; SH 180 (East Lancaster Street) is former US 80
Texas	Tarrant	Fort Worth	369.2	594.2	Spur 280 – Downtown Fort Worth	I-35W exit 52A, access to Fort Worth Central Station
Texas	Tarrant	Fort Worth	369.8– 369.9	595.1– 595.3	I-35W north / US 287 north / SH 121 north / Spur 347 west (Belknap Street) – Denton, D/FW Airport	North end of I-35W / US 287 overlap; US 377 north follows exit 52B
Texas	Tarrant	Haltom City	373.3	600.8	SH 183 west (Northeast 28th Street)	South end of SH 183 overlap
Texas	Tarrant	Haltom City	373.9	601.7	SH 183 east (East Belknap Street)	North end of SH 183 overlap
Texas	Tarrant	Haltom City	376.5– 376.6	605.9– 606.1	I-820 (Northeast Loop 820) / I-820 Express	I-820 exit 19
Texas	Tarrant	Keller	383.2	616.7	FM 1709 east (Keller Parkway) / Golden Triangle Boulevard – Grapevine	
Texas	Tarrant	Westlake	386.9– 387.0	622.7– 622.8	SH 170	Interchange
Texas	Denton	Roanoke	388.3	624.9	To Bus. SH 114 / Denton Street (Loop 118)	
Texas	Denton	Roanoke	389.0– 389.1	626.0– 626.2	SH 114	Interchange
Texas	Denton	Flower Mound	392.2	631.2	FM 1171 – Lewisville	
Texas	Denton	Argyle	395.5	636.5	FM 407 to I-35E – Justin	
Texas	Denton	Denton	401.6	646.3	FM 1830 south (Country Club Road) to FM 407 – Bartonville	
Texas	Denton	Denton	403.0– 403.1	648.6– 648.7	I-35E	I-35E exit 465B
Texas	Denton	Denton	403.9	650.0	US 77 south (East Eagle Drive)	South end of US 77 concurrency
Texas	Denton	Denton	404.6	651.1	FM 426 east (McKinney Street)	
Texas	Denton	Denton	405.6	652.7	US 77 north (North Locust Street) / US 380 west (West University Drive) to FM 428	North end of US 77 concurrency, south end of US 380 concurrency
Texas	Denton	Denton	408.1	656.8	Loop 288 / US 380 Truck west	Interchange
Texas	Denton	Cross Roads	412.6	664.0	US 380 east – McKinney	Interchange; north end of US 380 concurrency
Texas	Denton	Cross Roads	414.7	667.4	FM 424 south	
Texas	Denton	Aubrey	418.2	673.0	FM 428 (Springhill Road) – Aubrey, Celina	
Texas	Denton	Aubrey	420.2	676.2	FM 3524 south	
Texas	Denton	Pilot Point	423.2	681.1	FM 455 west – Sanger, Ray Roberts Lake and State Park	South end of FM 455 overlap
Texas	Denton	Pilot Point	423.9	682.2	Bus. US 377 north	
Texas	Denton	Pilot Point	425.4	684.6	FM 455 east / FM 1192 west (East Liberty Street) – Pilot Point, Celina	North end of FM 455 overlap
Texas	Denton	Pilot Point	426.7	686.7	Bus. US 377 south (North Washington Street) – Pilot Point	
Texas	Grayson	Tioga	430.2	692.3	Bus. US 377 north (South Donation Street)	
Texas	Grayson	Tioga	430.7	693.1	FM 121 east (Sherman Street) – Gunter	
Texas	Grayson	Tioga	431.0	693.6	Bus. US 377 south (North Donation Street)	
Texas	Grayson	Tioga	431.6	694.6	FM 922 west – Valley View	
Texas	Grayson	Collinsville	436.8	703.0	Bus. US 377 north (South Main Street)	
Texas	Grayson	Collinsville	437.0	703.3	FM 902 (Locust Street) – Lake Kiowa, Ethel	
Texas	Grayson	Collinsville	437.9	704.7	Bus. US 377 south (North Main Street)	
Texas	Grayson		440.1	708.3	Bus. US 377 north – Whitesboro	
Texas	Grayson	Whitesboro	443.5	713.7	Spur 129 to SH 56 – Whitesboro, Sherman	
Texas	Grayson	Whitesboro	445.1	716.3	Bus. US 377 south – Whitesboro	
Texas	Grayson	Whitesboro	445.2– 445.3	716.5– 716.6	US 82 – Gainesville, Sherman	Interchange; US 82 exit 624
Texas	Grayson		454.5	731.4	FM 901 south – Gordonville	South end of FM 901 overlap
Texas	Grayson		455.2	732.6	FM 901 north – Sheppard AFB Annex	North end of FM 901 overlap
Lake Texoma			460.4 0.0	740.9 0.0	Willis Bridge; Texas–Oklahoma line SH-99 begins	
See SH-99
Oklahoma	Lincoln	Stroud	139.9	225.1	SH-99 north / I-44 / Turner Turnpike – Oklahoma City, Tulsa	ODOT lists this as northern terminus; I-44 exit 179; road continues as SH-99 north
1.000 mi = 1.609 km; 1.000 km = 0.621 mi: Concurrency terminus; Incomplete access; Unopened

== Special and related routes ==
US 377 currently has seven business routes, all of which are located in the state of Texas.

=== State Highway Loop 118 ===
State Highway Loop 118
- Location: Denton County
- Length: 0.209 mi (336 m)
- Existed: February 4, 1941–present

State Highway Loop 118 (Loop 118) is a short and unsigned loop highway. The highway connects US 377 to Business State Highway 114 (Bus. SH 114) without the need for an intersection between those highways. The loop is just 0.209 miles (0.336 km) long, and is located entirely within the downtown portion of the town of Roanoke, Texas. The highway was first designated on February 4, 1941. The original route traveled from US 377 just south of Roanoke, along Oak Street, past Bus. SH 114 northward to SH 114, with State Highway Spur 118 (Spur 118) going from Loop 118 to US 377 via Denton Drive. On September 26, 1996, the stretch of Oak Street traveling from US 377 to Denton Drive was given back to the city of Roanoke.

The entire route is in Roanoke, Denton County.

mi	km	Destinations	Notes
0.000	0.000	US 377 (Front Street) – Ft. Worth, Denton	Southern terminus; road continues west as Denton Drive
0.209	0.336	Bus. SH 114 (Byron Nelson Boulevard)	Northern terminus; road continues as Oak Street
1.000 mi = 1.609 km; 1.000 km = 0.621 mi

=== State Highway Spur 118 ===
State Highway Spur 118
- Location: Denton County
- Existed: February 4, 1941 –September 26, 1996

State Highway Spur 118 (Spur 118) was designated on February 4, 1941, as a spur off Loop 118 in Roanoke to US 377. On September 26, 1996, Spur 118 became a portion of Loop 118 when it was rerouted onto the spur and the former portion of Loop 118 was removed and returned to the city of Roanoke.

== Related routes ==
- U.S. Route 77
- U.S. Route 177
- U.S. Route 277

== Notes ==
Browse numbered routes
← SH 361	TX	→ US 380
← SH-325	OK	→ US 385
