= Special routes of U.S. Route 377 =

Special routes of U.S. Route 377

Highway system
- United States Numbered Highway System; List; Special; Divided

A total of seven special routes of U.S. Route 377 currently exist, all of which are located in the state of Texas.

== Stephenville business loop ==
Business U.S. Highway 377
- Location: Stephenville, Texas
- Length: 4.324 mi (6.959 km)
- Existed: 1990–present

U.S. Route 377 Business J (Bus. US 377-J) is a business loop of US 377 serving the town of Stephenville, Texas in Erath County. The highway is known locally as Washington Street and briefly passes through the main campus of Tarleton State University.

The route was originally designated in 1960 as Texas State Highway Loop 195 (Loop 195), running from US 67 / US 377 west of Stephenville to US 281 near the Stephenville Clark Regional Airport. Loop 195 was extended to US 377 northeast of Stephenville in 1962, forming what is now known locally as the South Loop. In 1965, Loop 195 swapped routes with US 377, with Loop 195 running through town along Washington Street while US 377 was re-routed onto the South Loop. Loop 195 was cancelled in 1990 as the highway was re-designated to Bus. US 377 J.

Major intersections

The entire route is in Erath County.

| Location | mi | km | Destinations | Notes |
|---|---|---|---|---|
| Stephenville | 0.0 | 0.0 | US 67 south / US 377 south | No access to and from northbound US 67 / US 377 |
| Stephenville | 1.9 | 3.1 | SH 108 (Graham Street) | Access to Texas Health Harris Methodist Hospital Stephenville |
| Stephenville | 2.7 | 4.3 | US 281 | |
| | 4.3 | 6.9 | US 377 | |
1.000 mi = 1.609 km; 1.000 km = 0.621 mi: Incomplete access

== Granbury business loop ==
Business U.S. Highway 377
- Location: Granbury, Texas
- Length: 3.506 mi (5.642 km)
- Existed: 1990–present

U.S. Route 377 Business H (Bus. US 377-H) is a business loop of US 377 located in Granbury, Texas in Hood County. The highway is known locally as Pearl Street.

Bus. US 377 H was first designated as Texas State Highway Loop 426 (Loop 426) in 1966 along the old route of US 377 through Granbury. Loop 426 was cancelled and re-designated as Bus. US 377 H in 1990.

Major intersections

The entire route is in Granbury, Hood County.

| mi | km | Destinations | Notes |
|---|---|---|---|
| 0.0 | 0.0 | US 377 south | No access to northbound US 377 |
| 1.5 | 2.4 | SH 144 south / FM 51 south – Glen Rose | South end of FM 51 overlap |
| 1.9 | 3.1 | FM 4 north / FM 51 north (Houston Street) | North end of FM 51 overlap; south end of FM 4 overlap |
| 3.5 | 5.6 | US 377 / FM 4 south – Fort Worth, Stephenville | Interchange; north end of FM 4 overlap |
1.000 mi = 1.609 km; 1.000 km = 0.621 mi: Concurrency terminus; Incomplete access

== Cresson business loop ==
Business U.S. Highway 377
- Location: Cresson, Texas
- Length: 2.5 mi (4.0 km)
- History: Designated on March 29, 2012

U.S. Route 377 Business F (Bus. US 377-F) is a business loop of US 377 that will serve the town of Cresson, Texas in Hood and Johnson counties.

Bus. US 377 F was designated on March 29, 2012. The highway will follow the old routing of US 377 through Cresson once construction for the Cresson Relief Route is completed. The relief route is scheduled to open to traffic in late 2025.

Major intersections

The entire route is in Cresson.

| County | mi | km | Destinations | Notes |
|---|---|---|---|---|
| Hood | 0.0 | 0.0 | US 377 (Cresson Bypass) | |
| Hood | 1.3 | 2.1 | SH 171 – Weatherford, Cleburne | |
| Johnson | 2.5 | 4.0 | US 377 (Cresson Bypass) | |
1.000 mi = 1.609 km; 1.000 km = 0.621 mi

== Pilot Point business loop ==
Business U.S. Highway 377
- Location: Pilot Point, Texas
- Length: 3.022 mi (4.863 km)
- Existed: 1991–present

U.S. Route 377 Business E (Bus. US 377-E) is a business loop of US 377 that serves the town of Pilot Point in Denton County. The highway is known locally as Washington Street.

The highway was originally designated as Texas State Highway Loop 387 (Loop 387) in 1963 along the old route of SH 99 (now US 377) through Pilot Point. Loop 387 was cancelled and re-designated as Bus. US 377 E in 1991.

Major intersections

The entire route is in Pilot Point, Denton County.

| mi | km | Destinations | Notes |
|---|---|---|---|
| 0.0 | 0.0 | US 377 / FM 455 | |
| 1.2 | 1.9 | FM 1192 east | South end of FM 1192 overlap |
| 1.3 | 2.1 | FM 1192 west – Jordan State Park | North end of FM 1192 overlap |
| 3.0 | 4.8 | US 377 – Whitesboro, Aubrey | |
1.000 mi = 1.609 km; 1.000 km = 0.621 mi: Concurrency terminus

== Tioga business loop ==
Business U.S. Highway 377
- Location: Tioga, Texas
- Length: 0.773 mi (1,244 m)
- Existed: 1990–present

U.S. Route 377 Business D (Bus. US 377-D) is a business loop of US 377 that serves the town of Tioga, Texas in Grayson County. The highway is known locally as Donation Street and runs a block east of the main US 377.

The highway was first designated in 1969 as Texas State Highway Loop 475 (Loop 475) along an old route of US 377 through Tioga. Loop 475 was cancelled in 1990 and re-designated as Bus. US 377 D.

Major intersections

The entire route is in Tioga, Grayson County.

| mi | km | Destinations | Notes |
|---|---|---|---|
| 0.0 | 0.0 | US 377 | |
| 0.5 | 0.80 | FM 121 | |
| 0.8 | 1.3 | US 377 | |
1.000 mi = 1.609 km; 1.000 km = 0.621 mi

== Collinsville business loop ==
Business U.S. Highway 377
- Location: Collinsville, Texas
- Length: 1.102 mi (1.773 km)
- Existed: 1990–present

U.S. Route 377 Business C (Bus. US 377-C) is a business loop of US 377 that serves the town of Collinsville, Texas in Grayson County. The highway is known locally as Main Street and runs just a block east of the main US 377.

The highway was originally designated as Texas State Highway Loop 476 (Loop 476) in 1969 along the old route of US 377 through the town. Loop 476 was cancelled and re-designated as Bus. US 377 C in 1990.

Major intersections

The entire route is in Collinsville, Grayson County.

| mi | km | Destinations | Notes |
|---|---|---|---|
| 0.0 | 0.0 | US 377 | |
| 0.5 | 0.80 | FM 902 (Woodland Street) | |
| 1.1 | 1.8 | US 377 | |
1.000 mi = 1.609 km; 1.000 km = 0.621 mi

== Whitesboro business loop ==
Business U.S. Highway 377
- Location: Whitesboro, Texas
- Length: 4.89 mi (7.87 km)
- Existed: 1990–present

U.S. Route 377 Business B (Bus. US 377-B) is a business loop of US 377 that serves the town of Whitesboro, Texas in Grayson County. The highway is known locally as Union Street.

The highway was originally designated as Texas State Highway Loop 441 (Loop 441) in 1966 along an old route of SH 99 (now US 377) through the town. Loop 441 was cancelled and re-designated as Bus. US 377 B in 1990.

Major intersections

The entire route is in Grayson County.

| Location | mi | km | Destinations | Notes |
|---|---|---|---|---|
| | 0.0 | 0.0 | US 377 – Collinsville | |
| Whitesboro | 4.0 | 6.4 | SH 56 (Main Street) | |
| Whitesboro | 4.9 | 7.9 | US 377 – Madill, Denton | |
1.000 mi = 1.609 km; 1.000 km = 0.621 mi

== See also ==
- List of special routes of the United States Numbered Highway System
