= Rocksprings High School =

Location
- 201 North US Highway 377; Rocksprings, Texas 78880-0157; United States; 30.015495°N 100.206467°W

Information
- Type: Public high school
- Established: 1916
- School district: Rocksprings Independent School District
- Principal: Javier Cardenas
- Grades: Pre-K - 12
- Enrollment: 211 (2026)
- Colors: Red, White & Black
- Athletics conference: UIL Class 1A
- Mascot: Rocko the Angora and the Lady Angoras
- Yearbook: Angora
- Website: Rocksprings High School

Rocksprings High School is a public high school located in Rocksprings, Texas (USA) and classified as a 1A school by the UIL. It is part of the Rocksprings Independent School District located in central Edwards County. In 2015, the school was rated "met standard" by the Texas Education Agency.

== UIL ==
Rocksprings High School competes in UIL academics, in 2018 three students went to state to compete.

== School ==
The school is 1A but competes in 2A football. Rocksprings is the smallest school in Texas to play 11-man football.

== Teaching Staff ==
As of 2018 there are 6 teachers (not including class aides, administrative workers, etc.)

== Athletics ==
The Rocksprings Angoras compete in these sports -

- Basketball
- Cross country running
- Football
- Golf
- Powerlifting
- Tennis
- Track and field
- Volleyball

=== State titles ===
- Boys cross country -
  - 1991(1A), 1996(1A), 1998(1A)
- Girls Cross Country -
  - 1994(1A), 1995(1A), 1996(1A), 1997(1A)
- Boys track -
  - 1997(1A)
- Girls track -
  - 1996(1A), 1997(1A)
