= Carta Valley, Texas =

Unincorporated community in Texas, US

Coordinates: 29°47′37″N 100°40′29″W

Edwards County, Texas

Carta Valley is a small unincorporated community in southwestern Edwards County, Texas, United States, in the western part of the state.

== Population and location ==
Carta Valley had a population of 12 in 2000. It is located on U.S. Highway 377, 32 miles (50 km) southwest of Rocksprings.

== History ==
The town is named after Ed Carta, an early settler. The town became populated in 1898. A post office was established in 1907, a year after W.A. Varga opened a store and became the postmaster. Some time before 1913, a local school was opened.

The height of the town's population was in the 1960s when the population reached an estimated 150. At that time, there were five businesses. The town currently has a population of 12. (2000).
