= Tioga Independent School District =

School district in Texas

Address
- 405 N. Florence Street Tioga, TX, USA ESC Region 10
- Coordinates: 33°28′14″N 96°54′59″W

District information
- Type: Independent School District
- Grades: PK-12
- Superintendent: Josh Ballinger
- Schools: 2
- NCES District ID: 4842870

Students and staff
- Students: 613 (2025-26)
- Athletic conference: UIL Class AA
- District mascot: Bulldogs
- Colors: Green, Black, & White

Other information
- Website: www.tiogaisd.net

Tioga Independent School District (Tioga ISD, TISD) is a public school district based in Tioga, Texas, United States. Covering 35 square miles in southwest Grayson County, the district serves the City of Tioga and surrounding areas.

As of 2026, Tioga ISD operates two schools, including one high school and one combined middle-elementary school. The district most recently received an A rating from the Texas Education Agency (TEA).

== History ==
The district has one school that, from 1961 until the 2012-2013 school year, served students in grades Pre-Kindergarten through 8th grade. Students in grades nine through twelve attended Gunter High School in the Gunter Independent School District. This arrangement occurred since Tioga High School closed in 1961. At one time the district considered consolidating with another school district. Instead it opted to re-establish its high school.

However, beginning with the 2012-2013 school year, the District began its own high school, starting with the 9th grade and adding one grade each year until all 12 grades were served in the 2015-2016 school year.

In 2014 Tioga ISD had 392 students.

In 2009, the school district was rated "recognized" by the Texas Education Agency.

As of 2016 the district has a single building for all grades. It plans to establish a 62,000-square-foot (5,800 m^{2}) high school building and track. VLK Architects, a company in Fort Worth, Texas, is designing the building. In July 2016 the district voters approved a lease-purchase agreement to buy land for the high school. Groundbreaking occurred in December 2016.

The district changed to a four day school week in fall 2022.

== Academics ==
The Texas Education Agency gave Tioga ISD the "Early College High School" designation, and it is the only school district in Grayson County to have this. The early college program began in 2015.
