= Rocksprings Independent School District =

School district in Texas

Rocksprings Independent School District is a public school district based in Rocksprings, Texas (USA) and located in Edwards County, with a very small portion of the district extending into Val Verde County.

Rocksprings ISD has two campuses -

- Rocksprings High School (Grades 9–12)
- Rocksprings Elementary/Junior High School (Grades PK-8).

On April 30, 1985, the Carta Valley Independent School District merged into Rocksprings ISD.

In 2009, the school district was rated "academically acceptable" by the Texas Education Agency.
