= Devil's Sinkhole State Natural Area =

Protected area in Texas, United States

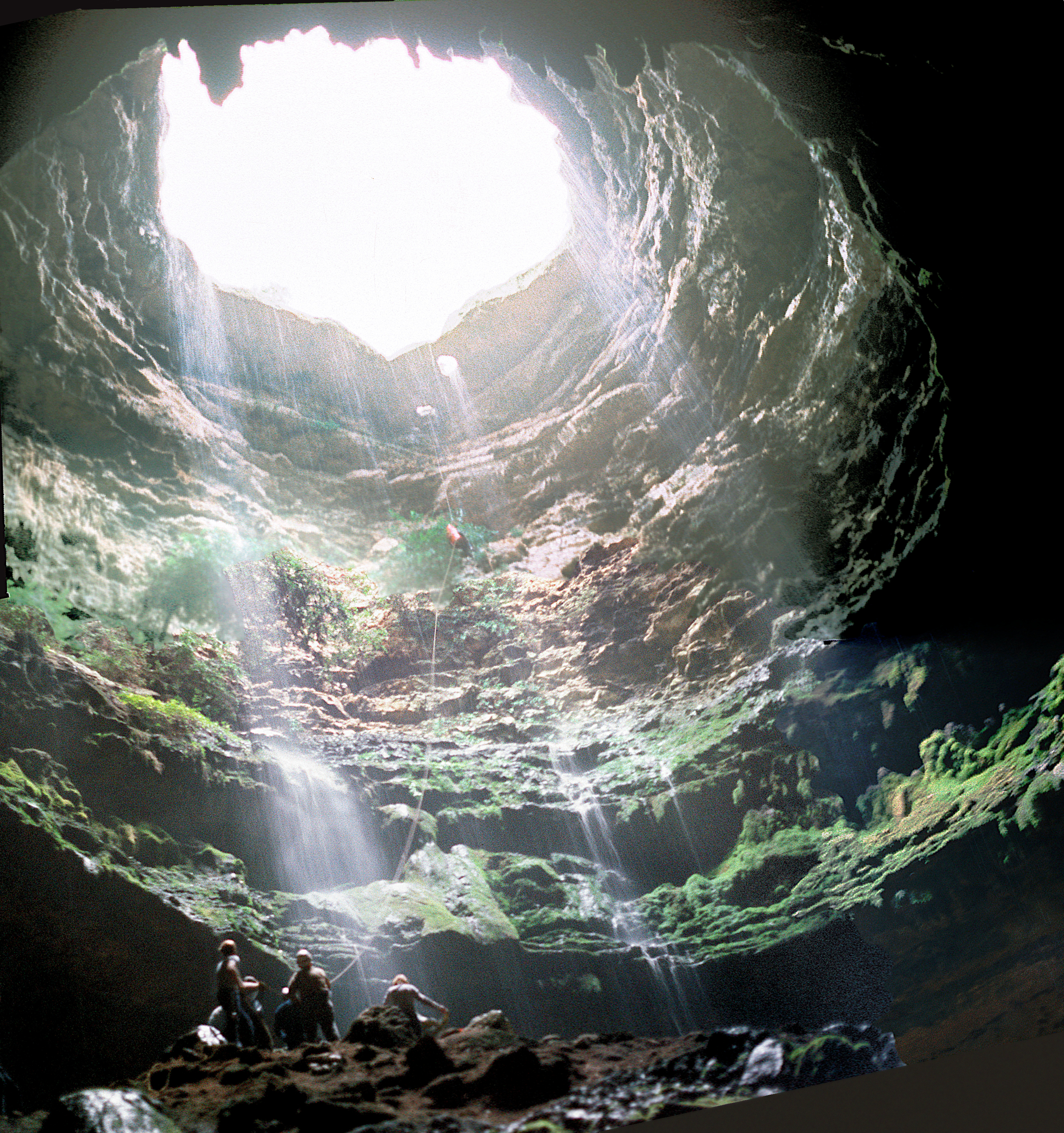
- Interior view of Devil's Sinkhole

- Location within Texas Location within the United States
- Coordinates: 30°3′8″N 100°6′12″W
- Area: 3,059.7 acres (1,238.2 ha)
- Established: 1985
- Visitors: 1,357 (in 2025)
- Governing body: Texas Parks and Wildlife Department
- Website: Official site

U.S. National Natural Landmark
- Designated: 1972

Devil's Sinkhole State Natural Area is a 3,059.7 acres (1,238 ha) nature reserve with a natural bat habitat in Edwards County, Texas, United States managed by the Texas Parks and Wildlife Department. The sinkhole is a 350-foot deep cavern with a roughly 50-by-140-foot (15.2 m × 42.7 m) opening at the surface. It is Texas' largest single-chambered cave and home to up to three million Mexican free-tailed bats between the months of April through October.

== History ==
About one million years ago slow-moving, slightly acidic water carved a cavern in 150-million-year-old Edwards Limestone. When the water receded, the cavern's ceiling collapsed creating the sinkhole.

While likely known to native peoples based on archeological clues, the cavern was first discovered in modern times by Ammon Billings, a local rancher leading a scouting party of five, west of Hackberry Creek in Edwards County in 1876. Billings fired at a marauding party of hostile Indians and believed he hit one. Fearing a trap, they did not pursue the Indians but returned to the area the following day, May 21, 1876 with their spouses. It was then that the sinkhole was first encountered by Billings. Billings' wife, Lucinde Katherine Billings (née Stroop) and other wives in the returning party dubbed the sinkhole "The Devil's Sinkhole".

H. S. Barber carved his name inside the cave in 1889. Workers mined the sinkhole in the 1920s for bat guano to be sold for fertilizer or as a source of potassium nitrate. In 1968, the Devil's Sinkhole was designated as a National Natural Landmark by the National Park Service.

Devil's Sinkhole State Natural Area was once part of a working ranch owned by Clarence and Katherine Nicholson Whitworth. The State of Texas purchased the property from the Whitworth estate in 1985 and opened it to the public for limited access in 1992. On October 1, 2026, Texas Parks and Wildlife announced an additional 1200 acres were purchased from the Whitworth Ranch on the western side of the park. The additional land will add almost ten miles of trails.

== Facilities, admission ==
Access to the area is available only through advance reservations. Evening bat flight tours are offered in summer only. Guided nature hikes are also available.

Facilities include a wheelchair-accessible viewing platform and picnic areas. With reservations, tours are conducted by the Devil's Sinkhole Society, a local volunteer group that works in conjunction of Texas Parks and Wildlife Department and Bat Conservation International to facilitate visitor education and tours.

== See also ==
- List of Texas state parks
- List of museums in Central Texas
- List of sinkholes of the United States
- National Register of Historic Places listings in Edwards County, Texas
