= Edwards County, Texas =

County in Texas, United States

- County
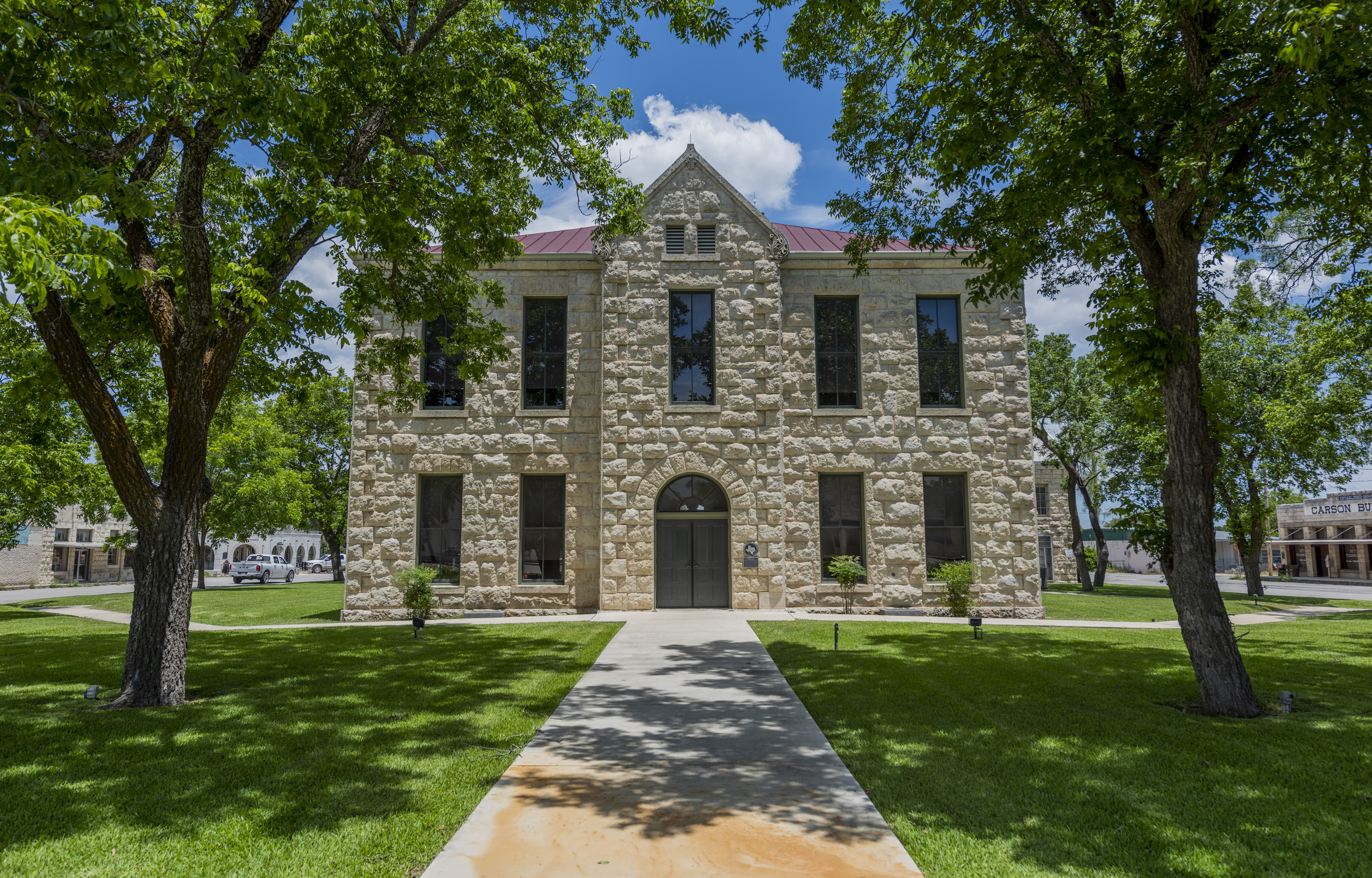
- The Edwards County Courthouse in Rocksprings

- Location within the U.S. state of Texas
- Coordinates: 29°58′N 100°18′W
- Country: United States
- State: Texas
- Founded: 1883
- Named for: Haden Edwards
- Seat: Rocksprings
- Largest town: Rocksprings

Area
  - Total: 2,120 sq mi (5,500 km^{2})
  - Land: 2,118 sq mi (5,490 km^{2})
  - Water: 2.0 sq mi (5.2 km^{2}) 0.09%

Population (2020)
  - Total: 1,422
  - Estimate (2025): 1,370 ▼
  - Density: 0.6714/sq mi (0.2592/km^{2})
- Time zone: UTC−6 (Central)
  - Summer (DST): UTC−5 (CDT)
- Congressional district: 23rd
- Website: www.co.edwards.tx.us

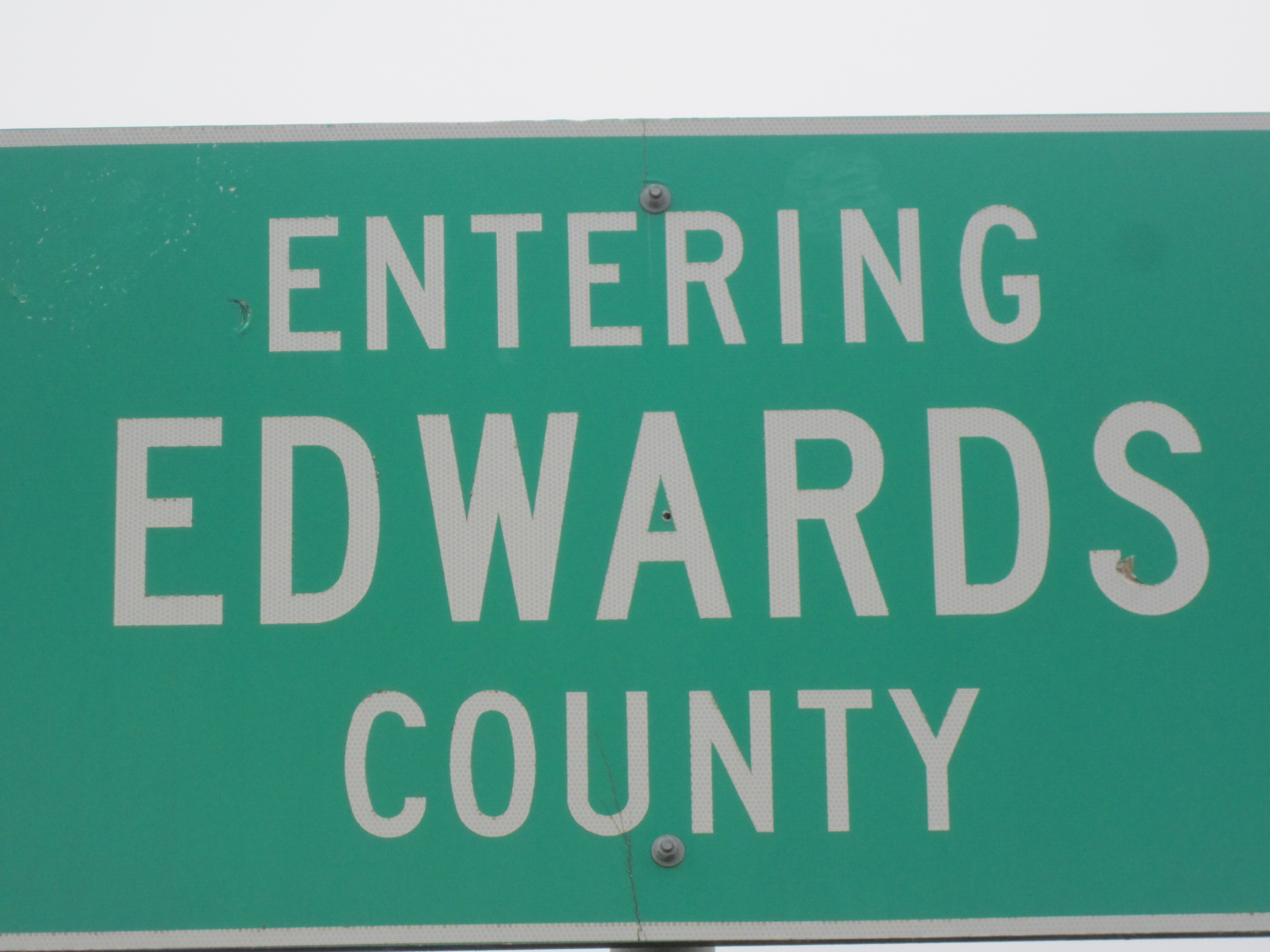

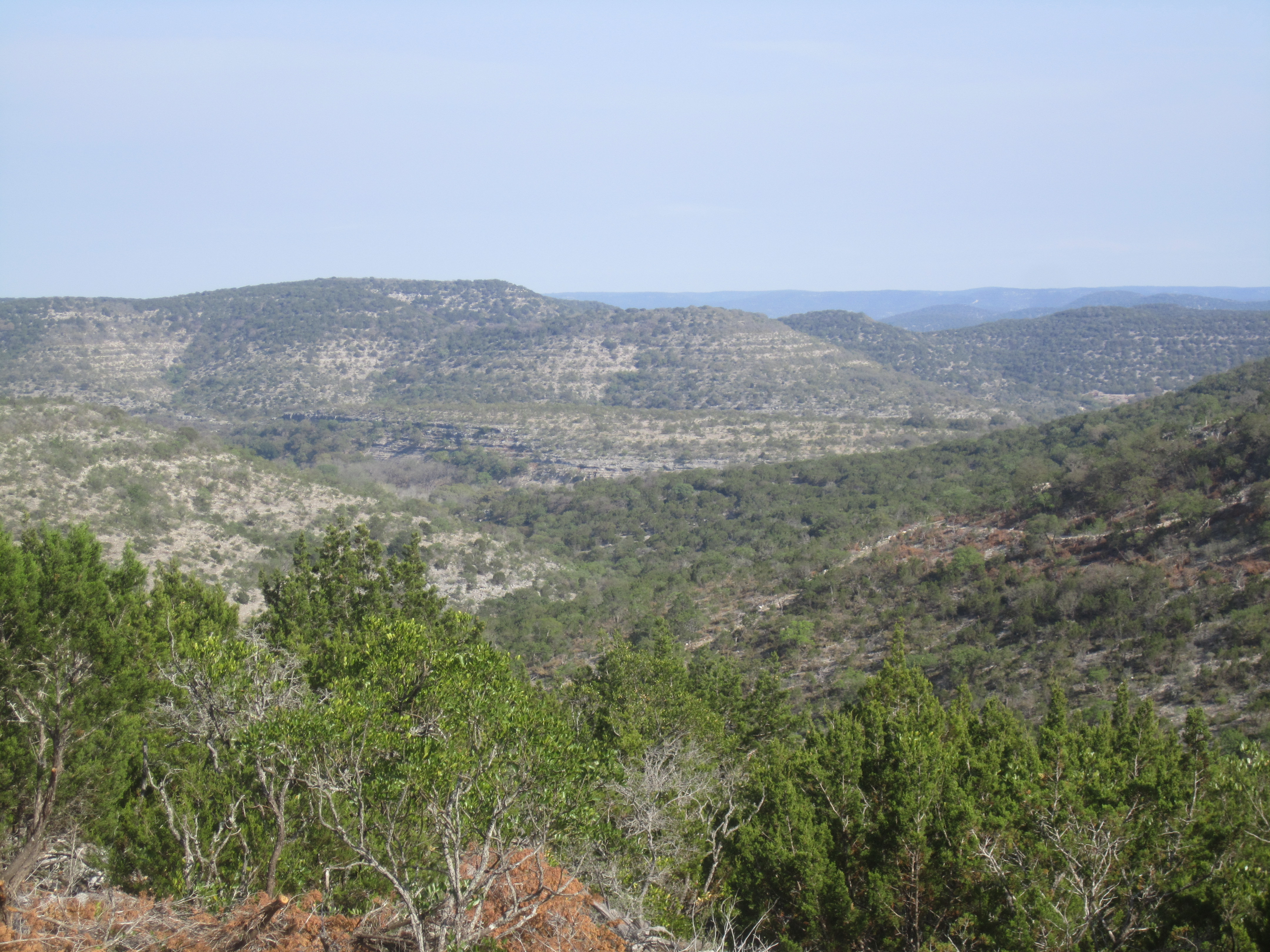
Texas Hill Country in Edwards County south of Rocksprings

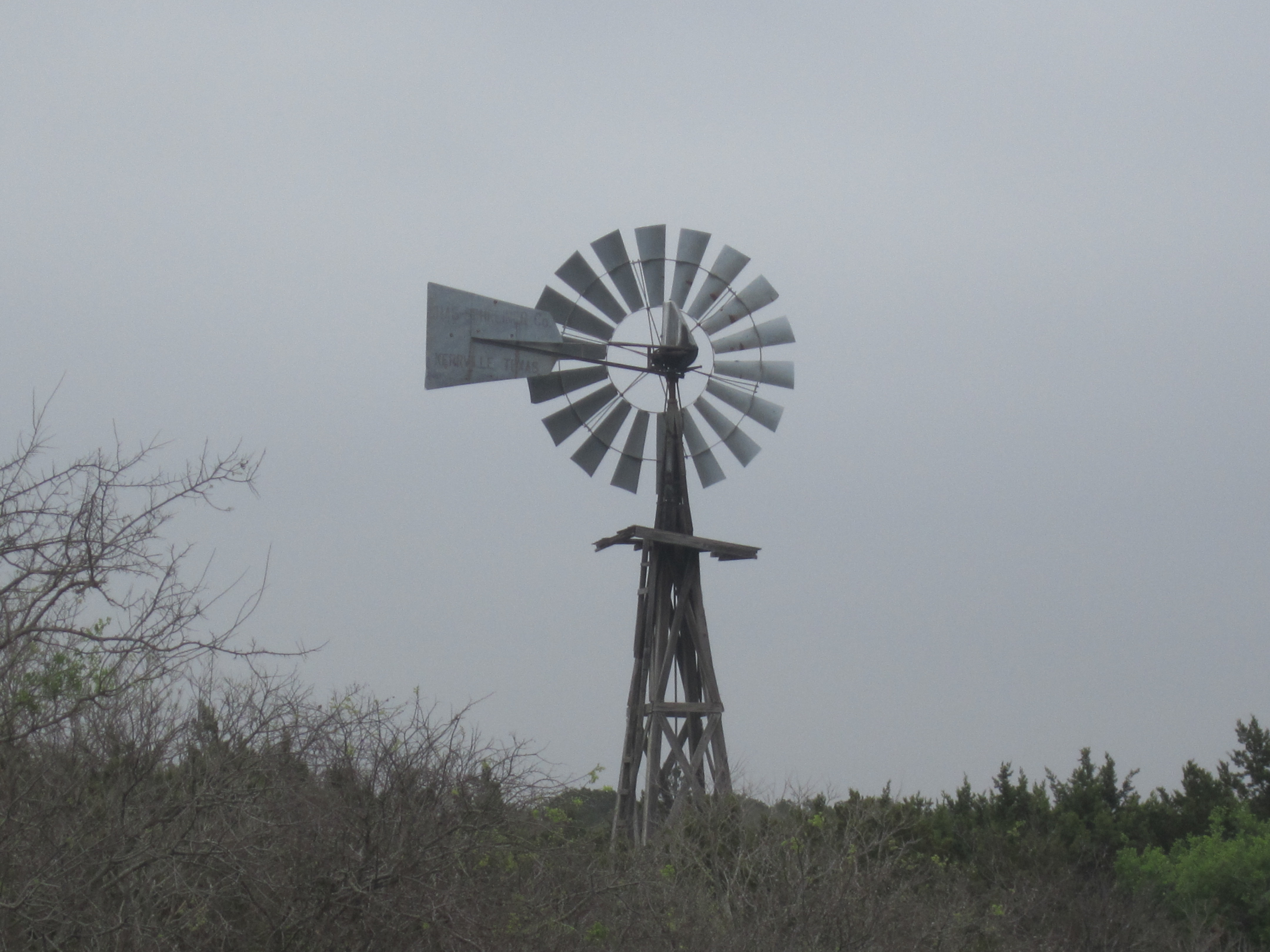
Lone wooden windmill in eastern Edwards County

Edwards County is a county located on the Edwards Plateau in the U.S. state of Texas. As of the 2020 census, its population was 1,422. The county seat is Rocksprings. The county was created in 1858 and organized in 1883. It is named for Haden Edwards, an early settler of Nacogdoches, Texas. The Edwards Aquifer and Edwards Plateau are named after the county by reason of their locations.

== History ==
Before white settlement of the area in the mid-1800's, the land was inhabited by the Lipan Apache and Comanche. Looking for protection from Comanches, Lipan Apache chief El Gran Cabezón persuaded the Franciscans and the Spanish military to establish San Lorenzo de la Santa Cruz Mission on the Nueces River. The mission was abandoned in 1771.

In 1825, Haden Harrison Edwards alongside Stephen F. Austin contracts with Coahuila y Tejas to move 800 families into east Texas. The following year, Edwards announced the creation of the Republic of Fredonia near Nacogdoches, an early attempt to secede from Mexico. Austin joined forces with Mexico against Edwards, causing the latter to flee in 1827 to Louisiana. Edwards would later return to Texas during the Texas Revolution before settling in Nacogdoches where he would die in 1849.

Edwards County officially formed in 1858 from Bexar County. In 1871, Clint Smith, age 11, and brother Jeff Smith, age 9, were kidnapped by Native Americans near Rocksprings. Later that decade on June 1, 1879, the last recorded Native American raid in the county occurred, where a woman and her two children were killed at the Half Moon Prairie.

The county was officially organized and named after Haden Harrison Edwards in 1883. Rocksprings was officiated as county seat in 1891, with a county courthouse built by architects Ben Davey and Bruno Schort. Rocksprings Telephone Company was founded in 1898.

In 1913, the county lost land in its eastern section to Real County. Several years later, on April 13, 1927, Rocksprings was hit by a tornado, killing 56 people and injuring 150.

Rocksprings called itself the "Top-o-the-World" in mohair production during its peak in 1940. Six years later, in 1946, oil was discovered in the county.

Kickapoo Cavern State Park, around 6,400 acres (26 km^{2}) across county borders into neighboring Kinney County, was opened in 1991. The following year, Devil's Sinkhole State Natural Area opened. It is the largest and third-deepest single-chambered cavern in the state.

== Geography ==
According to the U.S. Census Bureau the county has a total area of 2,120 square miles (5,500 km^{2}), of which 2,118 square miles (5,490 km^{2}) are land and 2.0 square miles (5.2 km^{2}) (0.09%) are covered by water.

=== Major highways ===
- U.S. Highway 83
- U.S. Highway 277
- U.S. Highway 377
- State Highway 41
- State Highway 55

=== Adjacent counties ===
- Sutton County (north)
- Kimble County (northeast)
- Kerr County (east)
- Real County (southeast)
- Uvalde County (southeast)
- Kinney County (south)
- Val Verde County (west)

== Demographics ==
Historical population
Census	Pop.	Note	%±
1880	266		—
1890	1,970		640.6%
1900	3,108		57.8%
1910	3,768		21.2%
1920	2,283		−39.4%
1930	2,764		21.1%
1940	2,933		6.1%
1950	2,908		−0.9%
1960	2,317		−20.3%
1970	2,107		−9.1%
1980	2,033		−3.5%
1990	2,266		11.5%
2000	2,162		−4.6%
2010	2,002		−7.4%
2020	1,422		−29.0%
2025 (est.)	1,370	▼	−3.7%
U.S. Decennial Census; 1850–2010 2010 2020

=== Racial and ethnic composition ===
Edwards County, Texas – Racial and ethnic composition Note: the US Census treats Hispanic/Latino as an ethnic category. This table excludes Latinos from the racial categories and assigns them to a separate category. Hispanics/Latinos may be of any race.
Race / Ethnicity (NH = Non-Hispanic)	Pop 1980	Pop 1990	Pop 2000	Pop 2010	Pop 2020	% 1980	% 1990	% 2000	% 2010	% 2020
White alone (NH)	1,046	1,076	1,161	947	651	51.45%	47.48%	53.70%	47.30%	45.78%
Black or African American alone (NH)	2	0	3	10	2	0.10%	0.00%	0.14%	0.50%	0.14%
Native American or Alaska Native alone (NH)	12	4	11	11	5	0.59%	0.18%	0.51%	0.55%	0.35%
Asian alone (NH)	2	4	1	3	11	0.10%	0.18%	0.05%	0.15%	0.77%
Native Hawaiian or Pacific Islander alone (NH)	x	x	0	0	1	x	x	0.00%	0.00%	0.07%
Other race alone (NH)	4	0	0	0	2	0.20%	0.00%	0.00%	0.00%	0.14%
Mixed race or Multiracial (NH)	x	x	12	4	32	x	x	0.56%	0.20%	2.25%
Hispanic or Latino (any race)	967	1,182	974	1,027	718	47.57%	52.16%	45.05%	51.30%	50.49%
Total	2,033	2,266	2,162	2,002	1,422	100.00%	100.00%	100.00%	100.00%	100.00%

=== 2020 census ===
As of the 2020 census, the county had a population of 1,422. The median age was 51.4 years. 19.8% of residents were under the age of 18 and 29.2% of residents were 65 years of age or older. For every 100 females there were 100.3 males, and for every 100 females age 18 and over there were 99.0 males age 18 and over.

The racial makeup of the county was 67.6% White, 0.1% Black or African American, 0.6% American Indian and Alaska Native, 0.8% Asian, 0.1% Native Hawaiian and Pacific Islander, 8.1% from some other race, and 22.7% from two or more races. Hispanic or Latino residents of any race comprised 50.5% of the population.

<0.1% of residents lived in urban areas, while 100.0% lived in rural areas.

There were 577 households in the county, of which 27.7% had children under the age of 18 living in them. Of all households, 57.2% were married-couple households, 19.4% were households with a male householder and no spouse or partner present, and 18.2% were households with a female householder and no spouse or partner present. About 20.1% of all households were made up of individuals and 13.3% had someone living alone who was 65 years of age or older.

There were 963 housing units, of which 40.1% were vacant. Among occupied housing units, 81.6% were owner-occupied and 18.4% were renter-occupied. The homeowner vacancy rate was 1.0% and the rental vacancy rate was 8.9%.

=== 2000 census ===
As of the 2000 census, 2,162 people, 801 households, and 586 families resided in the county. The population density was less than 1/km^{2} (2.6/mi^{2}). The 1,217 housing units averaged 1/mi^{2} (0.39/km^{2}). The racial makeup of the county was 83.26% White, 0.79% African American, 0.79% Native American, 0.14% Asian, 12.72% from other races, and 2.31% from two or more races. About 45.05% of the population was Hispanic or Latino of any race.

Of the 801 households, 31.70% had children under the age of 18 living with them, 60.80% were married couples living together, 8.90% had a female householder with no husband present, and 26.80% were not families. About 24.70% of all households were made up of individuals, and 13.50% had someone living alone who was 65 years of age or older. The average household size was 2.66 and the average family size was 3.20.

In the county, the population was distributed as 28.50% under the age of 18, 6.50% from 18 to 24, 23.20% from 25 to 44, 25.70% from 45 to 64, and 16.20% who were 65 years of age or older. The median age was 39 years. For every 100 females, there were 102.60 males. For every 100 females age 18 and over, there were 98.20 males.

The median income for a household in the county was $25,298, and for a family was $27,083. Males had a median income of $21,912 versus $14,907 for females. The per capita income for the county was $12,691. About 24.60% of families and 31.60% of the population were below the poverty line, including 47.40% of those under age 18 and 17.70% of those age 65 or over.

== Communities ==
=== Town ===
- Rocksprings (county seat)

=== Census-designated places ===
- Barksdale

=== Other unincorporated communities ===
- Carta Valley

== Politics ==
United States presidential election results for Edwards County, Texas
Year	Republican		Democratic		Third party(ies)	
Year	No.	%	No.	%	No.	%
1912	114	34.86%	133	40.67%	80	24.46%
1916	73	19.31%	299	79.10%	6	1.59%
1920	297	56.14%	201	38.00%	31	5.86%
1924	346	61.35%	204	36.17%	14	2.48%
1928	546	89.66%	59	9.69%	4	0.66%
1932	224	27.86%	575	71.52%	5	0.62%
1936	157	30.54%	354	68.87%	3	0.58%
1940	175	23.65%	565	76.35%	0	0.00%
1944	187	31.91%	348	59.39%	51	8.70%
1948	185	34.32%	329	61.04%	25	4.64%
1952	586	73.43%	210	26.32%	2	0.25%
1956	533	79.67%	133	19.88%	3	0.45%
1960	463	72.46%	168	26.29%	8	1.25%
1964	371	52.11%	337	47.33%	4	0.56%
1968	409	64.01%	148	23.16%	82	12.83%
1972	520	82.02%	109	17.19%	5	0.79%
1976	412	61.31%	258	38.39%	2	0.30%
1980	575	69.78%	237	28.76%	12	1.46%
1984	626	79.64%	159	20.23%	1	0.13%
1988	556	59.78%	368	39.57%	6	0.65%
1992	460	51.86%	254	28.64%	173	19.50%
1996	511	50.44%	437	43.14%	65	6.42%
2000	663	70.76%	261	27.85%	13	1.39%
2004	745	77.36%	217	22.53%	1	0.10%
2008	673	65.02%	346	33.43%	16	1.55%
2012	642	72.62%	232	26.24%	10	1.13%
2016	746	69.52%	303	28.24%	24	2.24%
2020	893	83.77%	168	15.76%	5	0.47%
2024	869	86.47%	133	13.23%	3	0.30%

United States Senate election results for Edwards County, Texas1
Year	Republican		Democratic		Third party(ies)	
Year	No.	%	No.	%	No.	%
2024	800	82.14%	152	15.61%	22	2.26%

United States Senate election results for Edwards County, Texas2
Year	Republican		Democratic		Third party(ies)	
Year	No.	%	No.	%	No.	%
2020	824	83.57%	144	14.60%	18	1.83%

Texas Gubernatorial election results for Edwards County
Year	Republican		Democratic		Third party(ies)	
Year	No.	%	No.	%	No.	%
2022	712	87.47%	99	12.16%	3	0.37%

== Education ==
School districts include:

- Rocksprings Independent School District
- Nueces Canyon Consolidated Independent School District

The designated community college is Southwest Texas Junior College.

== See also ==
- List of museums in Central Texas
- National Register of Historic Places listings in Edwards County, Texas
- Recorded Texas Historic Landmarks in Edwards County
