= Kickapoo Cavern State Park =

State park in Texas (US)

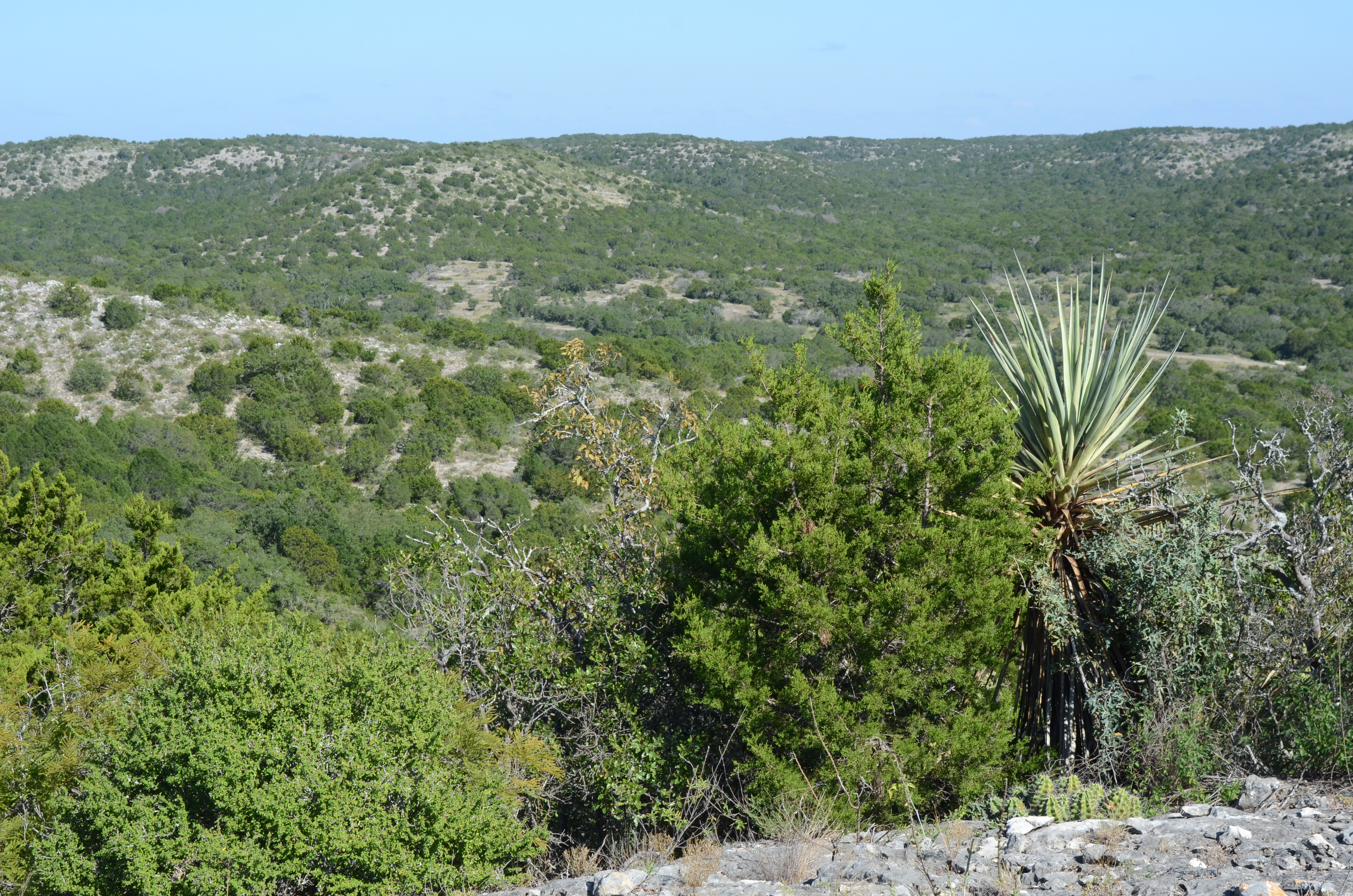
- Kickapoo Cavern State Park, October 2020

- Location within Texas Location within the United States
- Location: Edwards County, Texas; Kinney County, Texas
- Nearest city: Brackettville, Texas
- Coordinates: 29°36′43″N 100°26′54″W
- Area: 6,368 acres (2,577 ha)
- Created: 1991
- Operator: Texas Parks and Wildlife Department
- Visitors: 6,823 (in 2025)
- Website: Official site

Kickapoo Cavern State Park is a 6,368 acres (2,577 ha) state park straddling the Kinney and Edwards county line in Texas, United States located 22 miles north of Brackettville that is managed by the Texas Parks and Wildlife Department. Kickapoo Cavern was opened as a state park in 1991.

== Features ==
Interesting features of the park include 20 known caves, two of which are large enough to be significant. Kickapoo Cavern is approximately .25 mile in length (1400 feet). It contains 14 miles of mountain biking trails, and 18 miles of undesignated hiking and birding trails.

Primitive tours of Kickapoo Cavern are scheduled every Saturday and require reservations.

== Nature ==
Mammals commonly found in the park include whitetail deer, raccoon, ringtail, gray fox, rock squirrel, porcupine, rabbit, and various other rodents. Commonly found birds are Gray vireo, Varied bunting, and Montezuma quail. Also, various uncommon species of reptiles and amphibians live in the park, including the Barking frog, Mottled Rock Rattlesnake, and Texas alligator lizard.

== See also ==
- List of Texas state parks
