= Collinsville High School (Texas) =

Coordinates: 33.5618°N 96.9038°W

Location
- 202 N Broadway St. Collinsville, Texas 76233-0049; United States

Information
- School type: Public high school
- School district: Collinsville Independent School District
- Superintendent: Mark Dykes
- Principal: Kim Patterson
- Teaching staff: 28.36 (FTE)
- Grades: 6-12
- Enrollment: 281 (2023–2024)
- Student to teacher ratio: 9.91
- Colors: Maroon & Gold
- Athletics conference: UIL Class AA
- Mascot: Pirate
- Website: www.collinsvilleisd.org/269850_3

Collinsville High School is a public high school located in Collinsville, Texas (USA). It is part of the Collinsville Independent School District located in west central Grayson County and classified as a 2A school by the UIL. In 2015, the school was rated "Met Standard" by the Texas Education Agency.

== Athletics ==
The Collinsville Pirates compete in these sports —

Cross Country, Volleyball, Football, Basketball, Powerlifting, Tennis, Track, Softball & Baseball

=== State titles ===
- Baseball -
  - 1999(1A), 2024(2A), 2025(2A/D2)
- Boys Cross Country
  - 2026(2A)
- Girls Basketball -
  - 1956(B)
- Volleyball -
  - 2007(1A)

==== State finalists ====
- Baseball -
  - 1998(1A)
- Girls Basketball -
  - 1958(B)
- Softball -
  - 2006(1A)
