= National Register of Historic Places listings in Edwards County, Texas =

Location of Edwards County in Texas

This is a list of the National Register of Historic Places listings in Edwards County, Texas.

This is intended to be a complete list of properties listed on the National Register of Historic Places in Edwards County, Texas. There is one property listed on the National Register in the county. The property is also a State Antiquities Landmark and a Recorded Texas Historic Landmark.

This National Park Service list is complete through NPS recent listings posted March 21, 2025.

== Current listings ==
The locations of National Register properties may be seen in a mapping service provided.

	Name on the Register	Image	Date listed	Location	City or town	Description
1	Edwards County Courthouse and Jail	Edwards County Courthouse and Jail	November 7, 1979 (#79002932)	Bounded by Austin, Sweeten, Well, and Main Sts. 30°00′58″N 100°12′30″W	Rocksprings	State Antiquities Landmark, Recorded Texas Historic Landmark

== See also ==
- National Register of Historic Places listings in Texas
- Recorded Texas Historic Landmarks in Edwards County
