= Collinsville Independent School District =

School district in Texas

Address
- 503 Reeves Street Collinsville, TX, USA ESC Region 10
- Coordinates: 33°33′31″N 96°54′26″W

District information
- Type: Independent School District
- Grades: PK-12
- Established: 1903; 123 years ago
- Superintendent: Dr. Harold Colson
- Governing agency: Texas Education Agency
- Schools: 2
- NCES District ID: 4814580

Students and staff
- Students: 649 (2025-26)
- Athletic conference: UIL Class AA
- District mascot: Pirates
- Colors: Maroon & Gold

Other information
- Website: www.collinsvilleisd.org

Collinsville Independent School District (Collinsville ISD, CISD) is a public school district based in Collinsville, Texas, United States. Covering 53 square miles, the district is primarily located in Grayson County, with a portion extending into Cooke County, and serves the City of Collinsville and surrounding areas.

As of 2026, Collinsville ISD operates two campuses: one combined middle-high school and one elementary school. The district most recently received a B rating from the Texas Education Agency (TEA).

== Schools ==
- Collinsville Junior High/High School (grades 6–12)
- Collinsville Elementary (grades K-5)
