= Rocksprings, Texas =

- town
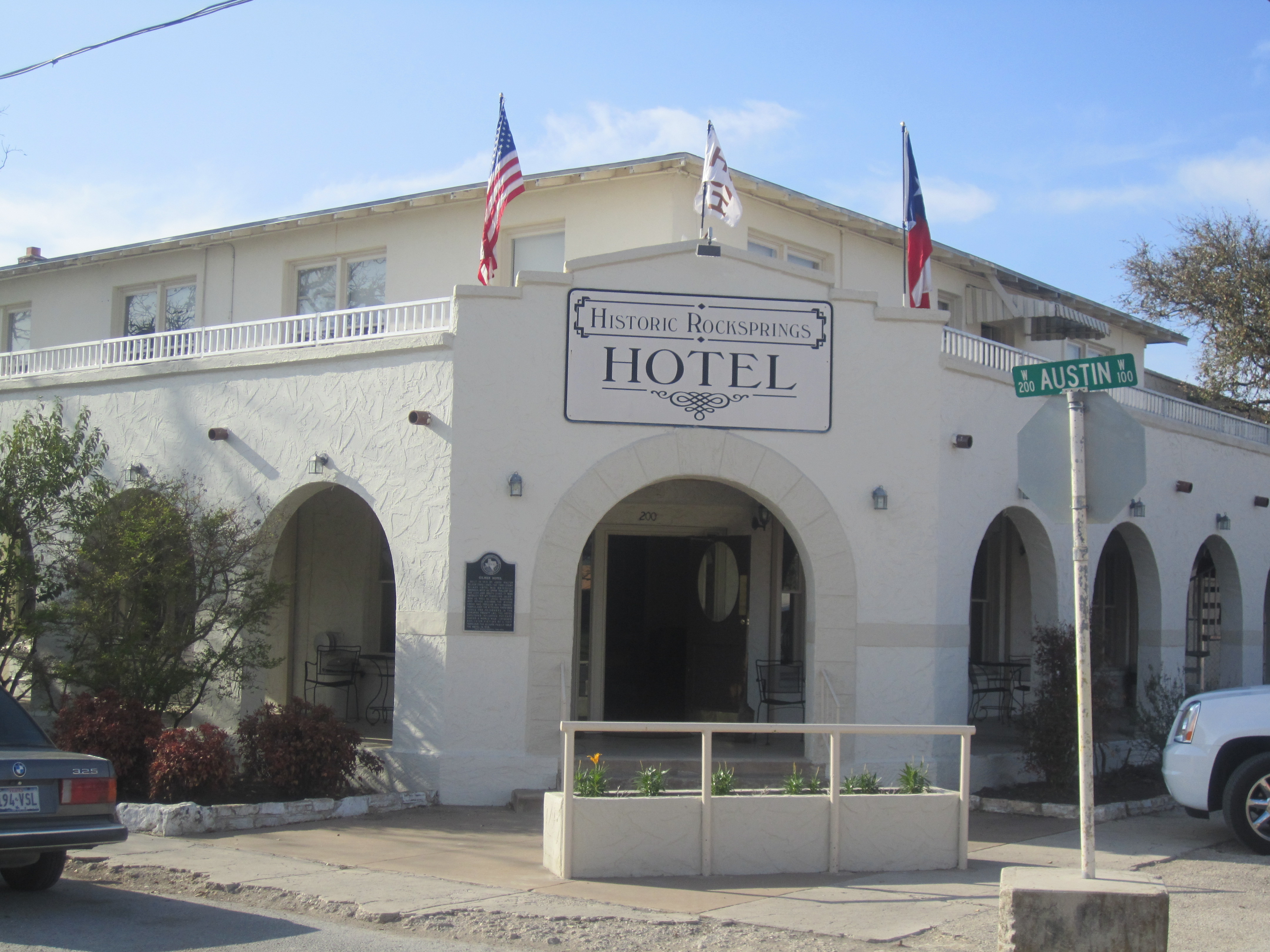
- Historic Rocksprings Hotel

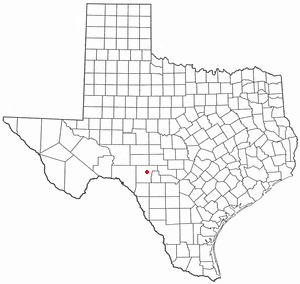
- Location of Rocksprings, Texas

- Location in the United States
- Coordinates: 30°0′58″N 100°12′32″W
- Country: United States
- State: Texas
- County: Edwards

Area
  - Total: 1.22 sq mi (3.15 km^{2})
  - Land: 1.22 sq mi (3.15 km^{2})
  - Water: 0 sq mi (0.00 km^{2})
- Elevation: 2,402 ft (732 m)

Population (2020)
  - Total: 874
  - Density: 719/sq mi (277/km^{2})
- Time zone: UTC-6 (Central (CST))
  - Summer (DST): UTC-5 (CDT)
- ZIP code: 78880
- Area code: 830
- FIPS code: 48-62816
- GNIS feature ID: 1345423
- Website: cityofrockspringstx.com

Rocksprings is a town in and the county seat of Edwards County, Texas, United States. At the 2020 census, the town population was 874, down from 1,182 at the 2010 census and 1,285 at the 2000 census. The town received its name from natural springs associated with the porous limestone rocks in the area.

== History ==
J. R. Sweeten sited Rocksprings in 1891 because of the springs nearby. Also in 1891, the town acquired a post office and was made county seat. The original courthouse built in the town burned in 1897. By 1914, Rocksprings had a population around 500.

During the early 1900s, hostilities between Anglos and Mexicans along the "Brown Belt" were common. On November 3, 1910, in Rocksprings, Antonio Rodriguez, a 20-year-old Mexican, was burned at the stake by a white mob for allegedly killing a white woman, Effie Greer Henderson. This event was widely publicized and protests against the treatment of Mexicans in the U.S. erupted within the interior of Mexico, namely in Guadalajara and Mexico City. This was part of a series of racist killings known as la Matanza.

On April 12, 1927, the town was hit by an F5 tornado that destroyed 235 of the 247 buildings in the town. The tornado killed 74 townspeople and injured 205, almost a third of the population at the time.

== Geography ==
Rocksprings is located northeast of the center of Edwards County at 30°0′58″N 100°12′32″W (30.016161, –100.209023). Rocksprings sits on top of the Edwards Plateau. According to the United States Census Bureau, the town has a total area of 1.2 sq mi (3.1 km^{2}), all land.

U.S. Route 377 passes through the center of the town, leading northeast 46 miles (74 km) to Junction and southwest 76 miles (122 km) to Del Rio. Texas State Highway 55 joins US 377 as Main Street through Rocksprings, but leads northwest 55 miles (89 km) to Sonora and south 68 miles (109 km) to Uvalde.

=== Climate ===
The climate in this area is characterized by hot, humid summers and generally mild to cool winters. According to the Köppen climate classification, Rocksprings has a humid subtropical climate, Cfa on climate maps.

Climate data for Rocksprings, Texas, 1991–2020 normals, extremes 1894–present
Month	Jan	Feb	Mar	Apr	May	Jun	Jul	Aug	Sep	Oct	Nov	Dec	Year
Record high °F (°C)	99 (37)	96 (36)	98 (37)	100 (38)	104 (40)	109 (43)	107 (42)	108 (42)	106 (41)	100 (38)	93 (34)	87 (31)	109 (43)
Mean maximum °F (°C)	75.9 (24.4)	80.0 (26.7)	85.0 (29.4)	91.0 (32.8)	94.2 (34.6)	96.9 (36.1)	98.4 (36.9)	98.0 (36.7)	93.4 (34.1)	88.9 (31.6)	79.9 (26.6)	74.6 (23.7)	100.6 (38.1)
Mean daily maximum °F (°C)	58.5 (14.7)	62.5 (16.9)	69.5 (20.8)	76.9 (24.9)	82.8 (28.2)	88.3 (31.3)	90.8 (32.7)	91.3 (32.9)	84.9 (29.4)	76.7 (24.8)	66.0 (18.9)	59.3 (15.2)	75.6 (24.2)
Daily mean °F (°C)	47.8 (8.8)	51.7 (10.9)	58.1 (14.5)	65.3 (18.5)	72.2 (22.3)	77.9 (25.5)	80.1 (26.7)	80.5 (26.9)	74.9 (23.8)	66.5 (19.2)	56.0 (13.3)	48.9 (9.4)	65.0 (18.3)
Mean daily minimum °F (°C)	37.2 (2.9)	40.8 (4.9)	46.7 (8.2)	53.7 (12.1)	61.5 (16.4)	67.5 (19.7)	69.5 (20.8)	69.7 (20.9)	64.8 (18.2)	56.3 (13.5)	46.1 (7.8)	38.4 (3.6)	54.4 (12.4)
Mean minimum °F (°C)	23.4 (−4.8)	26.8 (−2.9)	30.6 (−0.8)	38.5 (3.6)	49.7 (9.8)	61.2 (16.2)	65.7 (18.7)	64.7 (18.2)	53.4 (11.9)	40.7 (4.8)	29.7 (−1.3)	25.1 (−3.8)	19.8 (−6.8)
Record low °F (°C)	5 (−15)	3 (−16)	10 (−12)	20 (−7)	30 (−1)	45 (7)	58 (14)	53 (12)	38 (3)	19 (−7)	14 (−10)	5 (−15)	3 (−16)
Average precipitation inches (mm)	1.03 (26)	0.93 (24)	1.81 (46)	1.66 (42)	3.35 (85)	2.50 (64)	1.95 (50)	3.10 (79)	3.38 (86)	3.05 (77)	1.66 (42)	1.62 (41)	26.04 (662)
Average snowfall inches (cm)	0.2 (0.51)	0.0 (0.0)	0.0 (0.0)	0.0 (0.0)	0.0 (0.0)	0.0 (0.0)	0.0 (0.0)	0.0 (0.0)	0.0 (0.0)	0.0 (0.0)	0.0 (0.0)	0.0 (0.0)	0.2 (0.51)
Average precipitation days (≥ 0.01 in)	5.7	5.4	6.2	4.5	6.0	5.3	4.8	5.7	5.8	5.6	5.2	4.5	64.7
Average snowy days (≥ 0.1 in)	0.1	0.1	0.0	0.0	0.0	0.0	0.0	0.0	0.0	0.0	0.0	0.0	0.2
Source 1: NOAA
Source 2: National Weather Service

== Economy ==
The economy of Rocksprings is centered on the wool and mohair industry, and the town is recognized as the Angora goat capital of the world. Tourism has become a growing part of the economy, with the opening of Devil's Sinkhole State Natural Area, located about 8 miles (13 km) northeast of Rocksprings.

== Demographics ==
Historical population
Census	Pop.	Note	%±
1930	998		—
1940	1,339		34.2%
1950	1,436		7.2%
1960	1,182		−17.7%
1970	1,221		3.3%
1980	1,317		7.9%
1990	1,339		1.7%
2000	1,285		−4.0%
2010	1,182		−8.0%
2020	874		−26.1%
U.S. Decennial Census

=== 2020 census ===
Rocksprings racial composition (NH = Non-Hispanic) (Note: Note: the US Census treats Hispanic/Latino as an ethnic category. This table excludes Latinos from the racial categories and assigns them to a separate category. Hispanics/Latinos can be of any race.)
Race	Number	Percentage
White (NH)	214	24.49%
Black or African American (NH)	2	0.23%
Native American or Alaska Native (NH)	5	0.57%
Asian (NH)	4	0.46%
Pacific Islander (NH)	1	0.11%
Some Other Race (NH)	2	0.23%
Multiracial (NH)	12	1.37%
Hispanic or Latino	634	72.54%
Total	874	

As of the 2020 United States census, 874 people, 559 households, and 340 families were residing in the town.

=== 2000 census ===
As of the census of 2000, 1,285 people, 420 households, and 312 families resided in the town. The population density was 1,064.1 inhabitants per square mile (410.9/km^{2}). The 535 housing units averaged 443.0 per mi^{2} (170.7/km^{2}). The racial makeup of the town was 76.26% White, 1.17% African American, 0.93% Native American, 0.16% Asian, 18.75% from other races, and 2.72% from two or more races. Hispanics or Latinos of any race were 66.69% of the population.

Of the 420 households, 40.2% had children under 18 living with them, 58.3% were married couples living together, 11.7% had a female householder with no husband present, and 25.5% were not families. About 23.1% of all households were made up of individuals, and 11.9% had someone living alone who was 65 or older. The average household size was 2.99 and the average family size was 3.58.

In the town, the population was distributed as 33.5% under 18, 8.3% from 18 to 24, 25.6% from 25 to 44, 20.5% from 45 to 64, and 12.1% who were 65 or older. The median age was 32 years. For every 100 females, there were 105.3 males. For every 100 females 18 and over, there were 99.3 males.

The median income for a household in the town was $19,970, and for a family was $22,614. Males had a median income of $21,369 versus $14,408 for females. The per capita income for the town was $8,957. About 31.7% of families and 38.2% of the population were below the poverty line, including 51.6% of those under 18 and 16.8% of those 65 or over.

== Education ==
The town is served by the Rocksprings Independent School District and home to the Rocksprings High School Angoras. The school mascot is Rocko, the fighting Angora billy.

== In pop culture ==
The town of Rocksprings was the location of the Texas State Penitentiary, Spring Valley Unit, in two episodes in season three of the television show Brooklyn Nine-Nine.

== Photo gallery ==
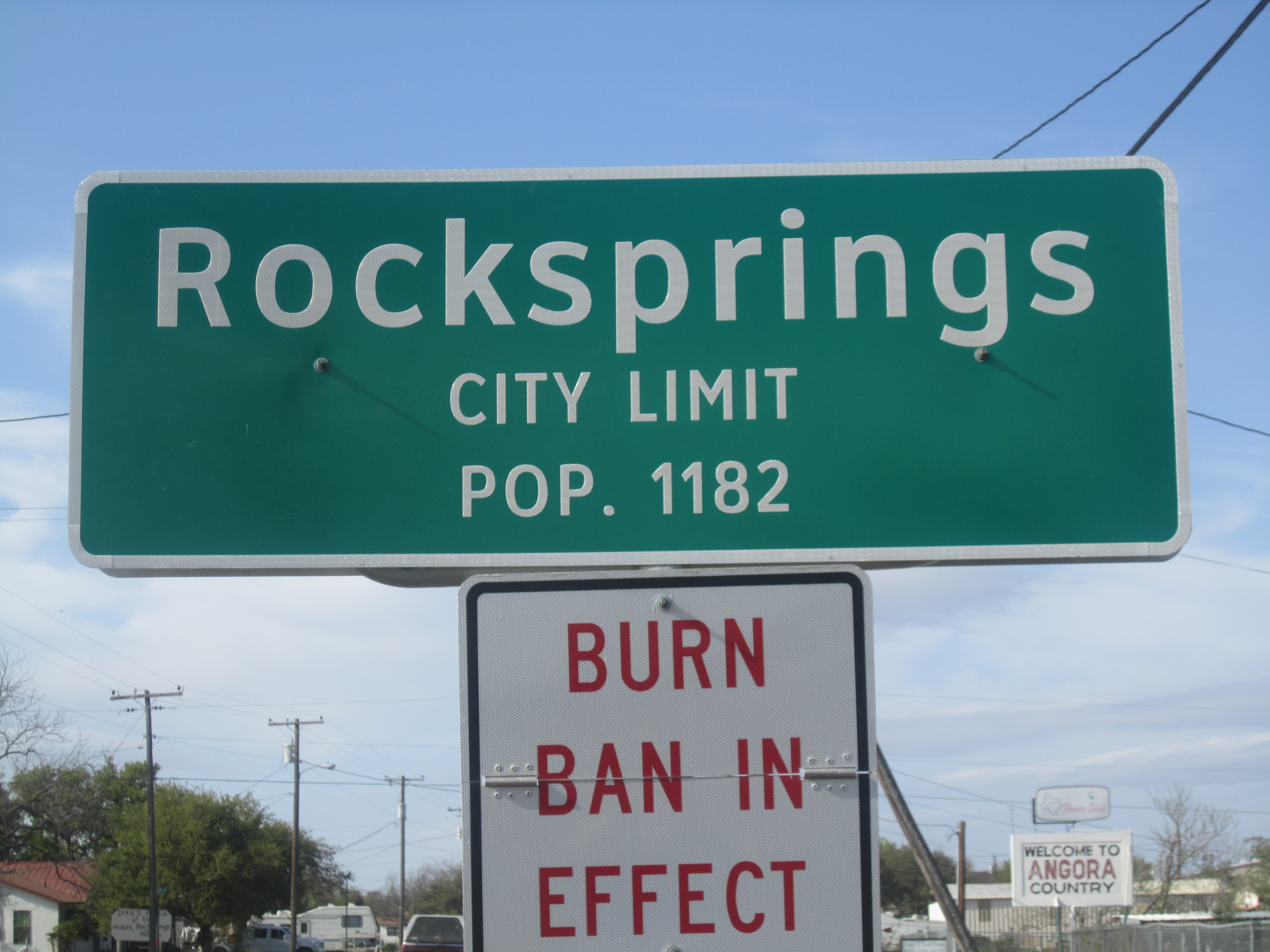
Entrance sign to Rocksprings, burn ban in effect in 2011

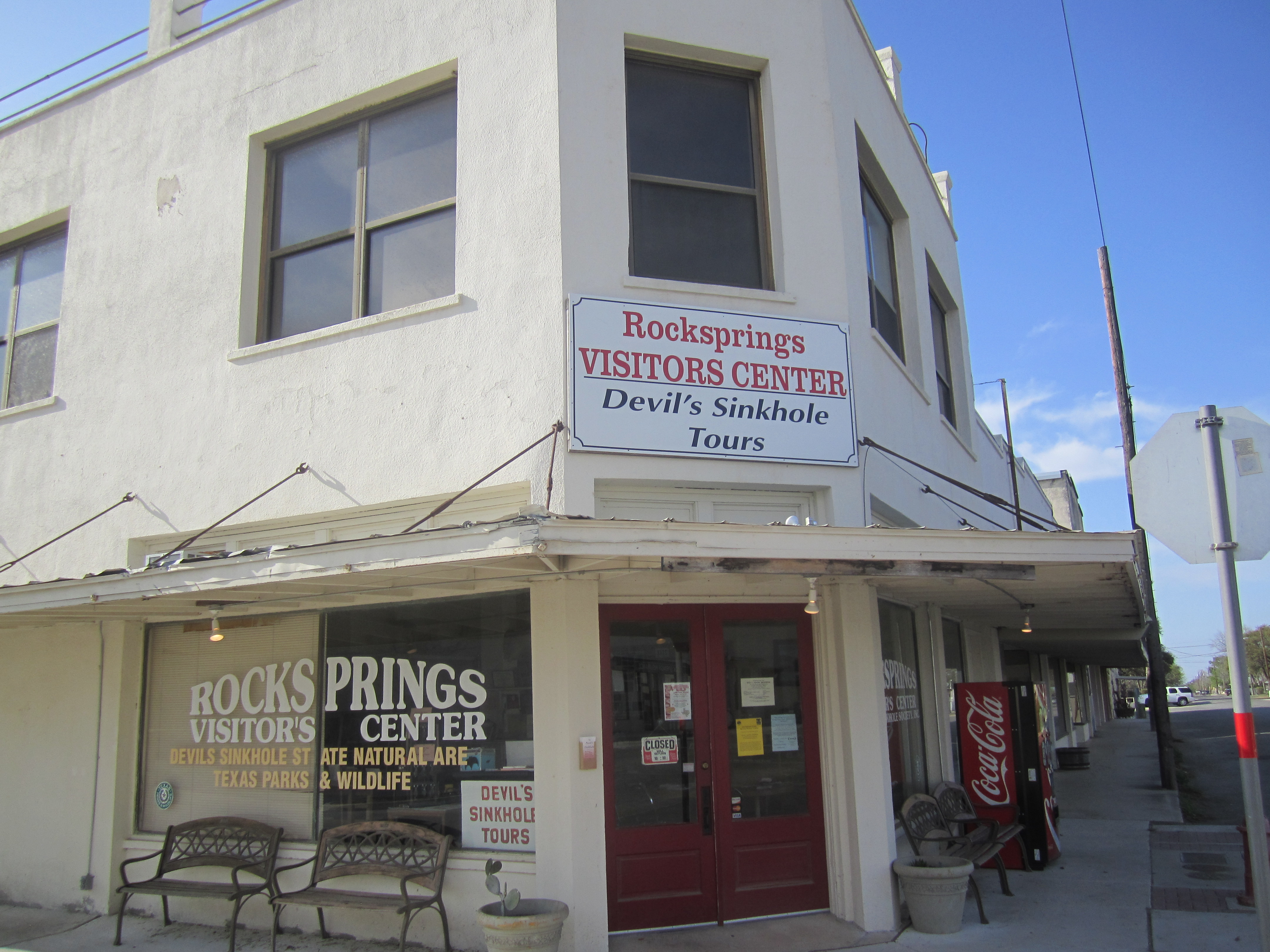
Rocksprings Visitor Center arranges tours of the nearby Devil's Sinkhole State Natural Area.

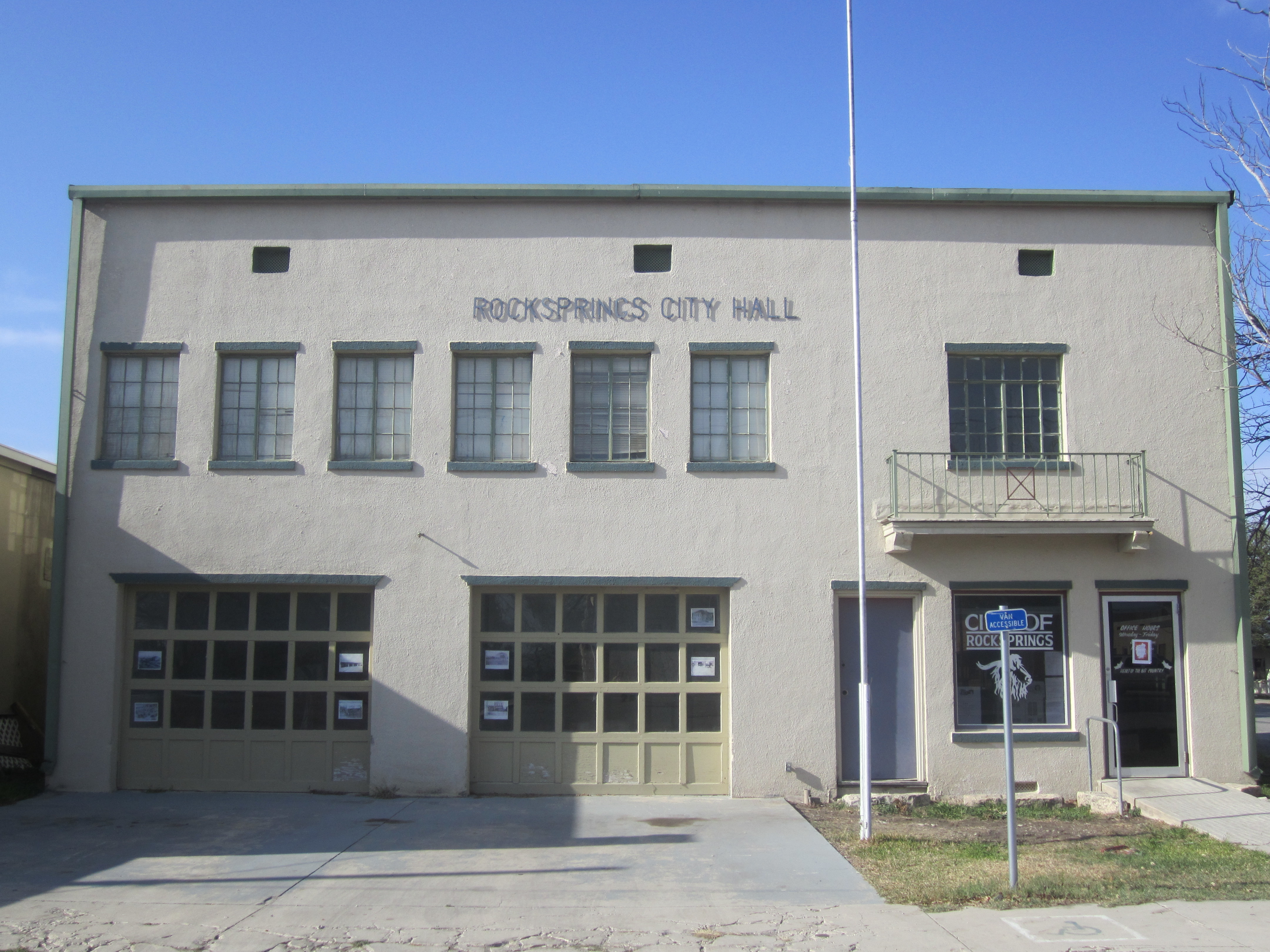
Rocksprings City Hall

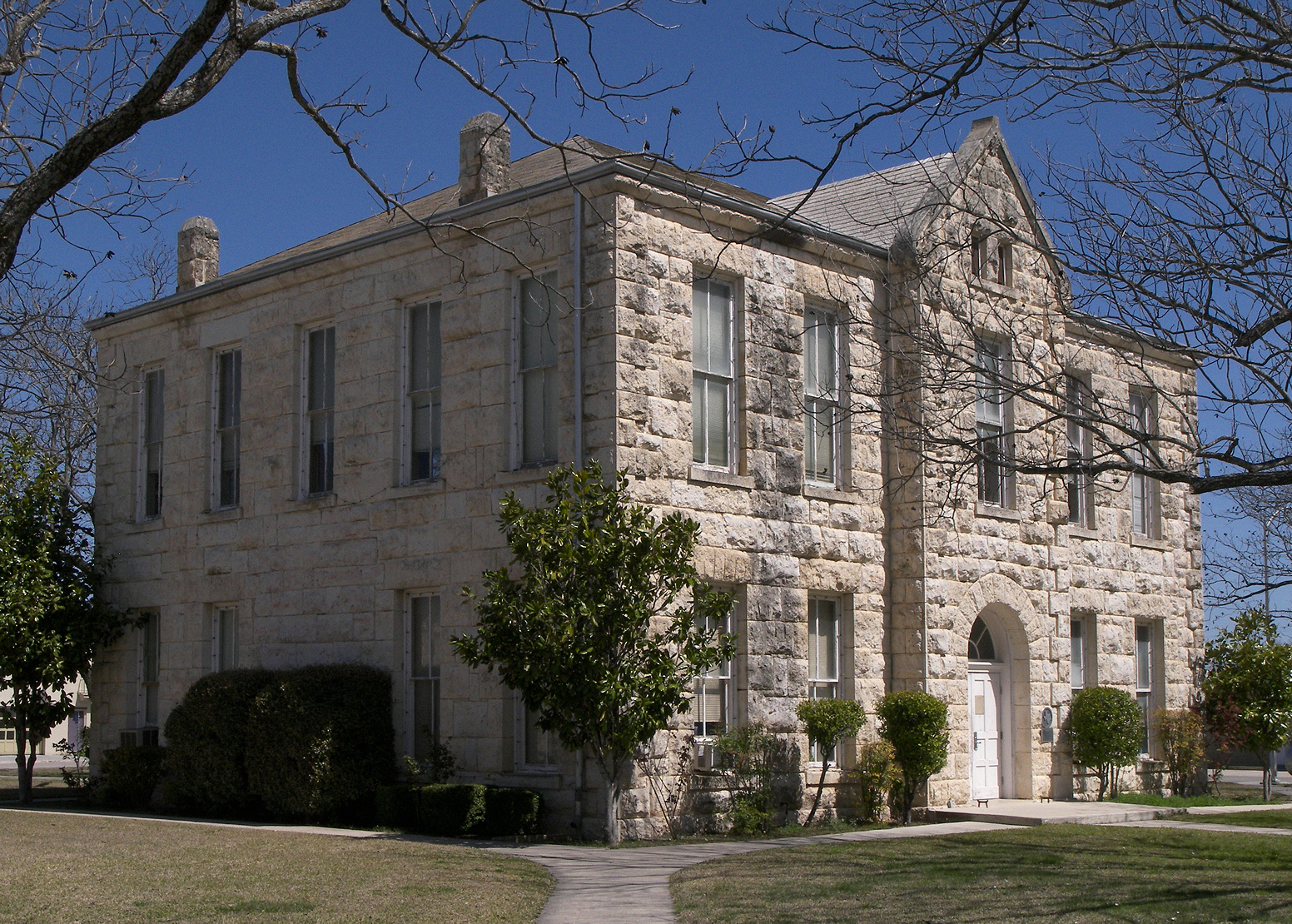
Edwards County Courthouse

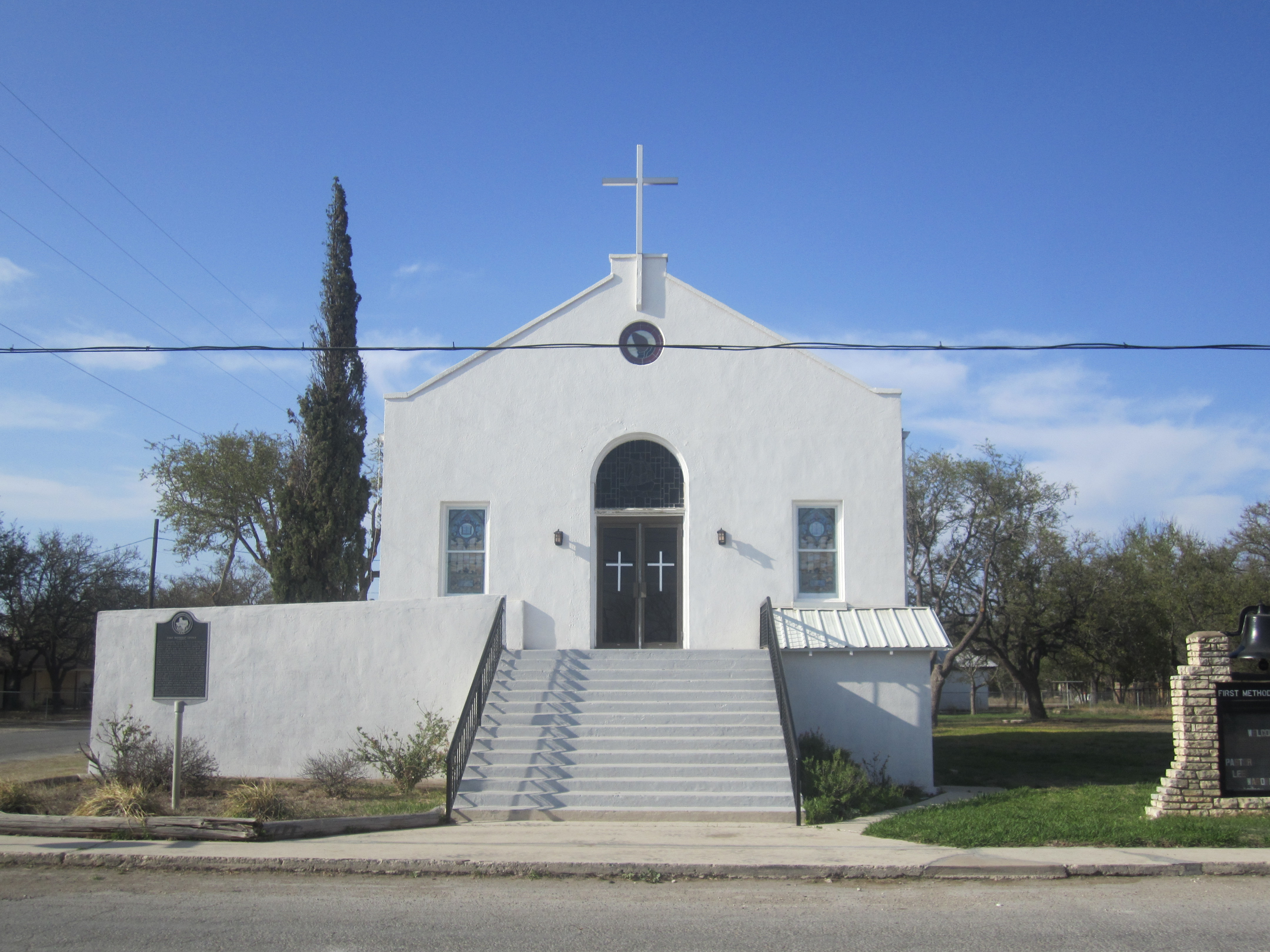
First Methodist Church in Rocksprings
