= Edwards County Courthouse and Jail =

- U.S. National Register of Historic Places
- Texas State Antiquities Landmark
- Recorded Texas Historic Landmark
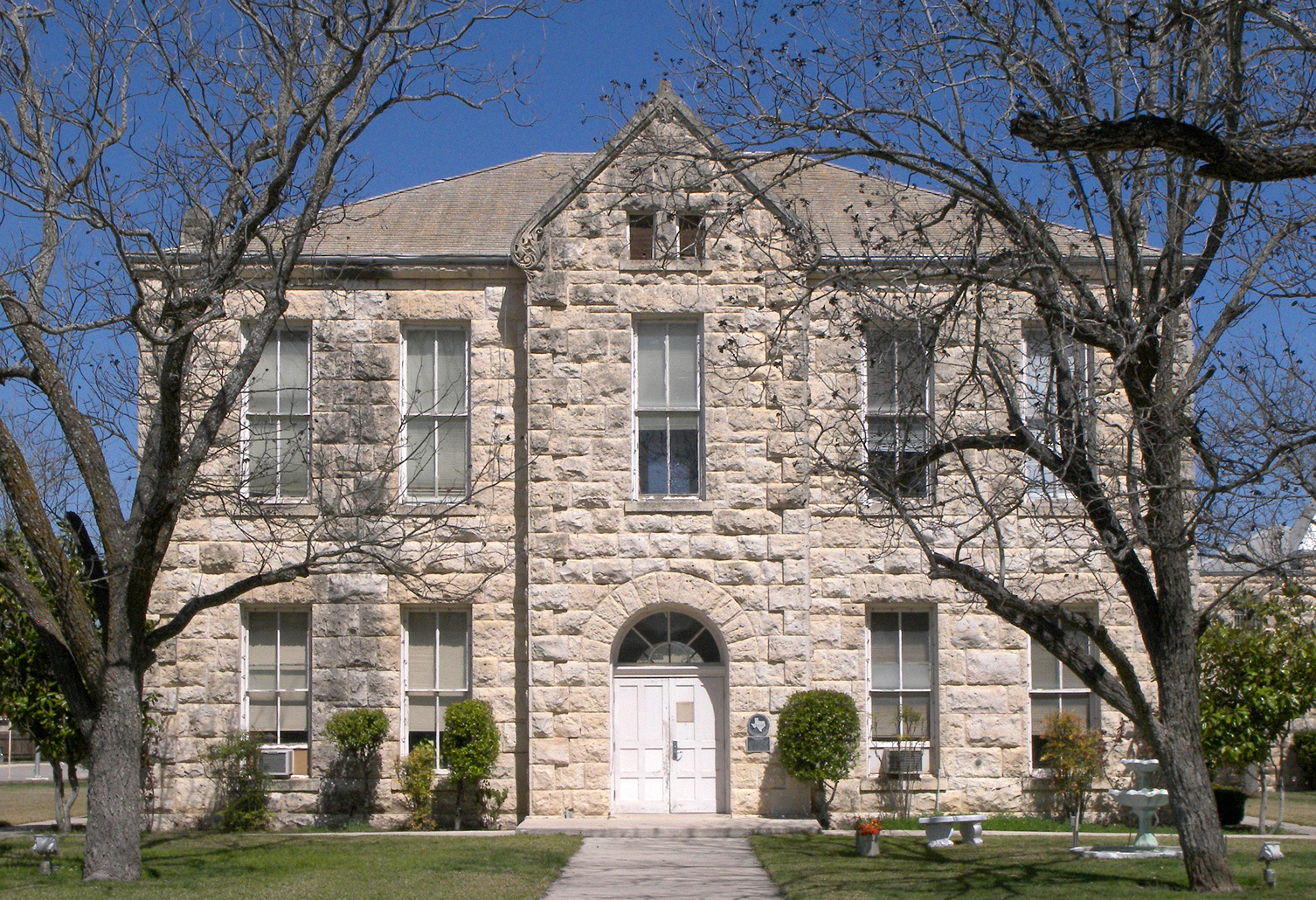
- Edwards County Courthouse

- Location within Texas Location within the United States
- Interactive map showing the location of Edwards County Courthouse
- Location: Public Sq., Rocksprings, Texas
- Coordinates: 30°0′57″N 100°12′28″W
- Area: less than one acre
- Built: 1891
- Architect: Ben Davey & Bruno Schott
- Architectural style: Eclectic
- NRHP reference No.: 79002932
- TSAL No.: 228
- RTHL No.: 1402

Significant dates
- Added to NRHP: November 7, 1979
- Designated TSAL: 8/5/1983
- Designated RTHL: 1973

Edwards County Courthouse is located in the center of downtown Rocksprings, Texas. The Courthouse was built by architects Ben Davey and Bruno Schort in the Romanesque Revival Style. It is listed by the Texas Historical Society as a historical structure.

== See also ==
- National Register of Historic Places listings in Edwards County, Texas
- Recorded Texas Historic Landmarks in Edwards County
- List of county courthouses in Texas
