= Walter Buck Wildlife Management Area =

Protected area in Texas, United States

Coordinates: 30.4451°N 99.8129°W

The former Walter Buck Wildlife Management Area is a 2,200-acre section of land along the South Llano River that is now part of South Llano River State Park near Junction, Texas.
