= Collinsville, Texas =

Town in Grayson County, Texas, United States

- Town
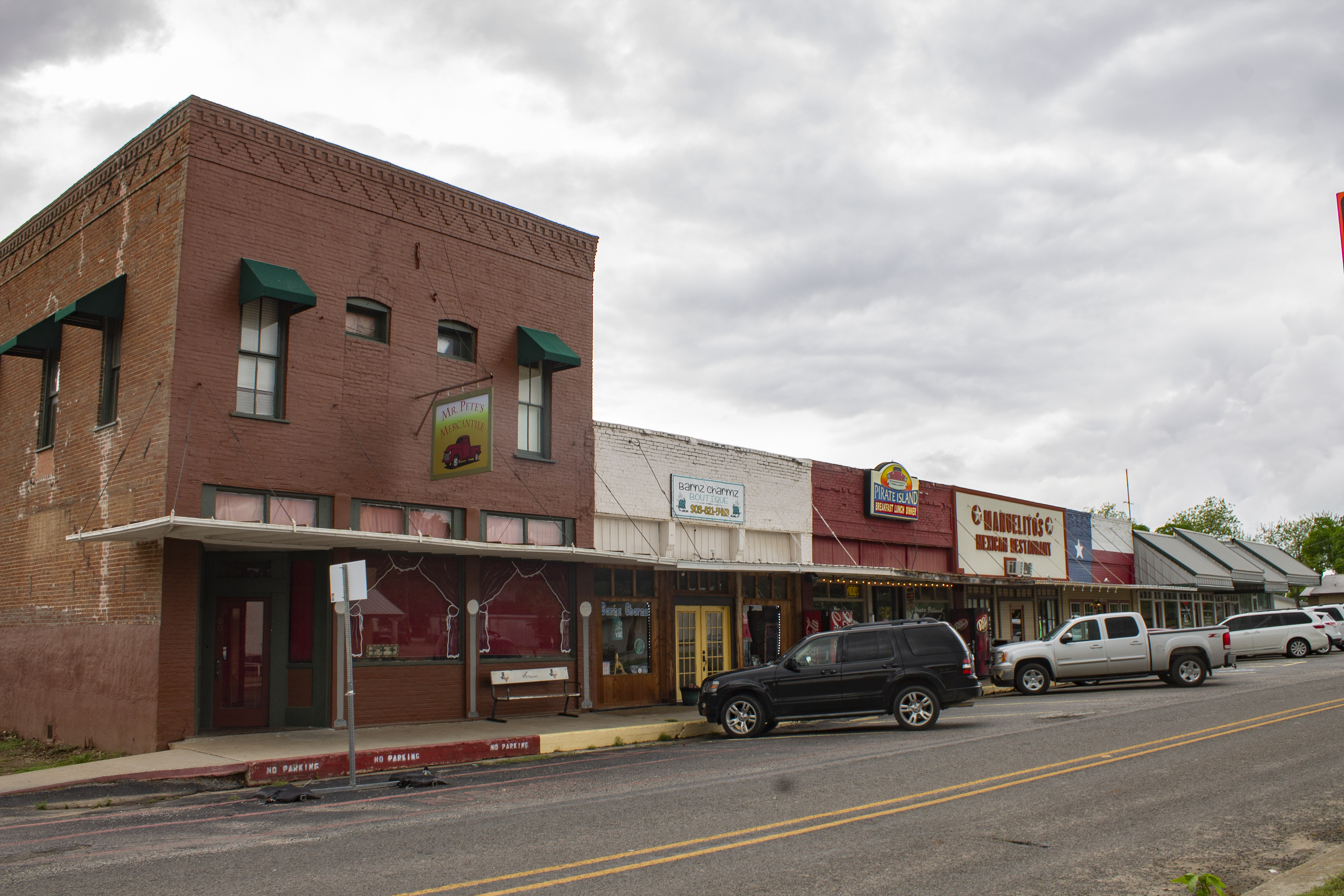
- Downtown Collinsville (2016)

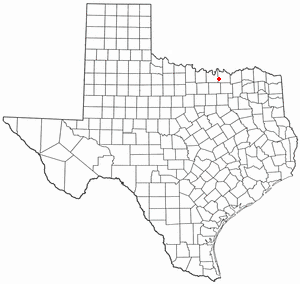
- Location of Collinsville, Texas

- Coordinates: 33°33′34″N 96°54′26″W
- Country: United States
- State: Texas
- County: Grayson

Area
  - Total: 0.98 sq mi (2.53 km^{2})
  - Land: 0.98 sq mi (2.53 km^{2})
  - Water: 0 sq mi (0.00 km^{2})
- Elevation: 738 ft (225 m)

Population (2020)
  - Total: 1,866
  - Density: 1,910/sq mi (738/km^{2})
- Time zone: UTC-6 (Central (CST))
  - Summer (DST): UTC-5 (CDT)
- ZIP code: 76233
- Area codes: 903, 430
- FIPS code: 48-16036
- GNIS feature ID: 2413227
- Website: www.collinsvilletexas.org

Collinsville is a town in Grayson County, Texas, United States. Its population was 1,866 at the 2020 census, up from 1,624 at the 2010 census. It is part of the Sherman–Denison metropolitan statistical area. Collinsville is located on U.S. Route 377, south of Whitesboro.

== History ==
In 1904, Collinsville Academy was built. The school had two stories and six rooms, and could accommodate about 400 students. The school was rebuilt in 1941 with the intention being to help the citizens of Collinsville retain jobs during the Depression, according to the older citizens of the community. A 20-room school was built to replace it, and continues to be used as an elementary school. A high school and junior high were built in 1995.

== Geography ==
Collinsville is located in southwestern Grayson County. US 377 passes through the west side of the town, leading north 7 miles (11 km) to Whitesboro and south 12 miles (19 km) to Pilot Point. Sherman, the Grayson County seat, is 22 miles (35 km) to the northeast.

According to the United States Census Bureau, Collinsville has a total area of 0.93 square miles (2.4 km^{2}), all land.

== Demographics ==
Historical population
Census	Pop.	Note	%±
1890	332		—
1900	666		100.6%
1910	791		18.8%
1920	837		5.8%
1930	670		−20.0%
1940	653		−2.5%
1950	561		−14.1%
1960	560		−0.2%
1970	768		37.1%
1980	860		12.0%
1990	1,033		20.1%
2000	1,235		19.6%
2010	1,624		31.5%
2020	1,866		14.9%
U.S. Decennial Census

Collinsville racial composition as of 2020 (NH = Non-Hispanic) (Note: Note: the US Census treats Hispanic/Latino as an ethnic category. This table excludes Latinos from the racial categories and assigns them to a separate category. Hispanics/Latinos can be of any race.)
Race	Number	Percentage
White (NH)	1,470	78.78%
Black or African American (NH)	16	0.86%
Native American or Alaska Native (NH)	11	0.59%
Asian (NH)	2	0.11%
Some Other Race (NH)	2	0.11%
Mixed/Multi-Racial (NH)	88	4.72%
Hispanic or Latino	277	14.84%
Total	1,866	

As of the 2020 United States census, there were 1,866 people, 661 households, and 479 families residing in the town.

== Education ==
The town is served by the Collinsville Independent School District and is home to the Collinsville High School Pirates.

== Notable people ==
- Bill Denton, gymnast who won silver at the 1932 Olympics
- William H. "Alfalfa Bill" Murray, ninth governor of Oklahoma

== See also ==
- List of municipalities in Texas
