= South Llano River State Park =

State park in Texas, United States

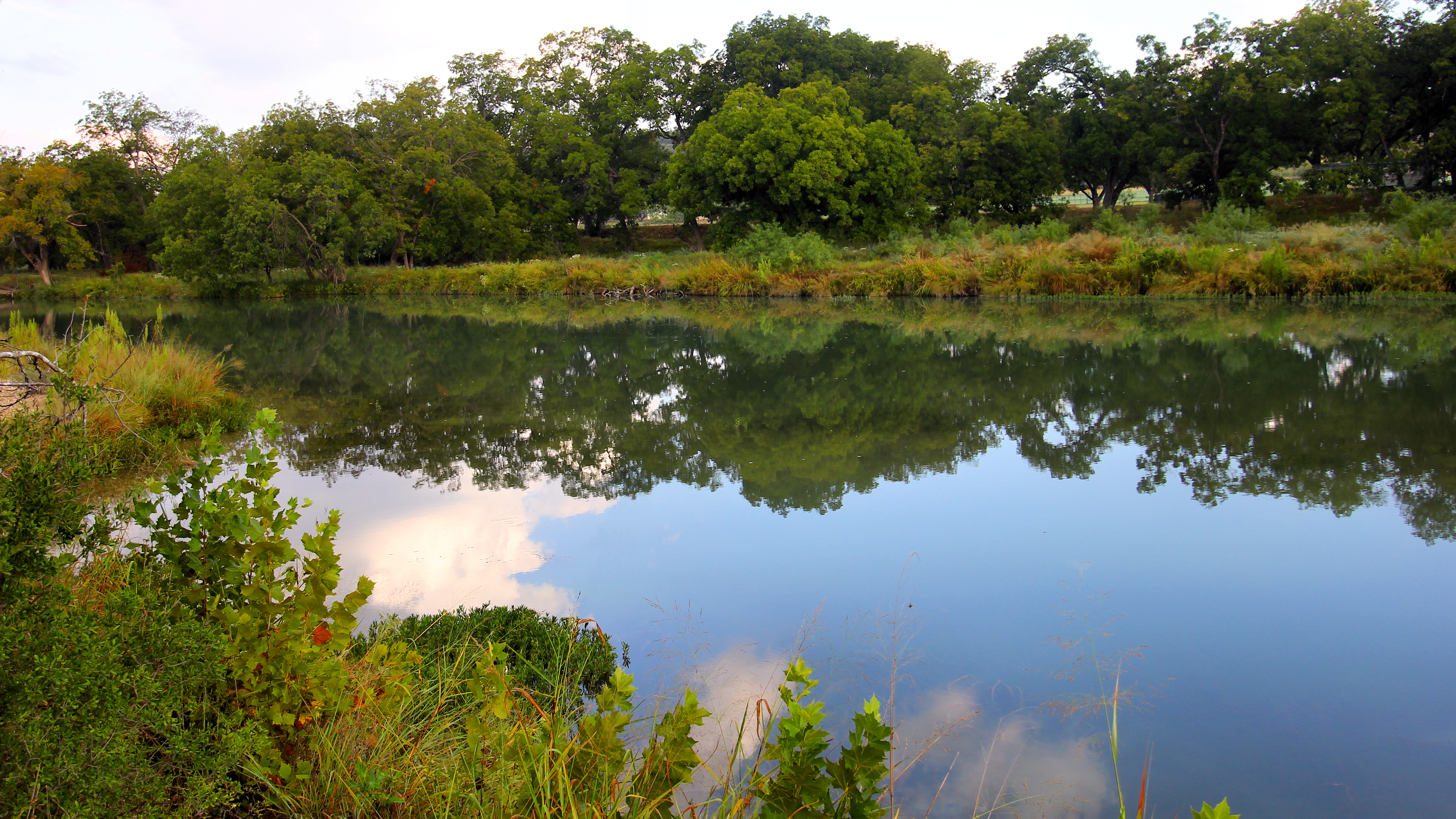
- The South Llano River seen from the park

- Location within Texas Location within the United States
- Location: Kimble County, Texas
- Nearest city: Junction, Texas
- Coordinates: 30°26′43″N 99°48′15″W
- Area: 2,600 acres (1,052 ha)
- Created: 1990
- Operator: Texas Parks and Wildlife Department
- Visitors: 50,486 (in 2025)
- Website: Official website

South Llano River State Park is a 2,600 acres (1,052 ha) state park located along the South Llano River in Kimble County, Texas. The park opened to the public in 1990 and is managed by the Texas Parks and Wildlife Department.

== History ==
The park's land was donated by its previous owner, Walter Buck Jr., whose family had used the land for goat and sheep ranching and pecan harvesting.

== Nature and Wildlife ==
=== Animals ===
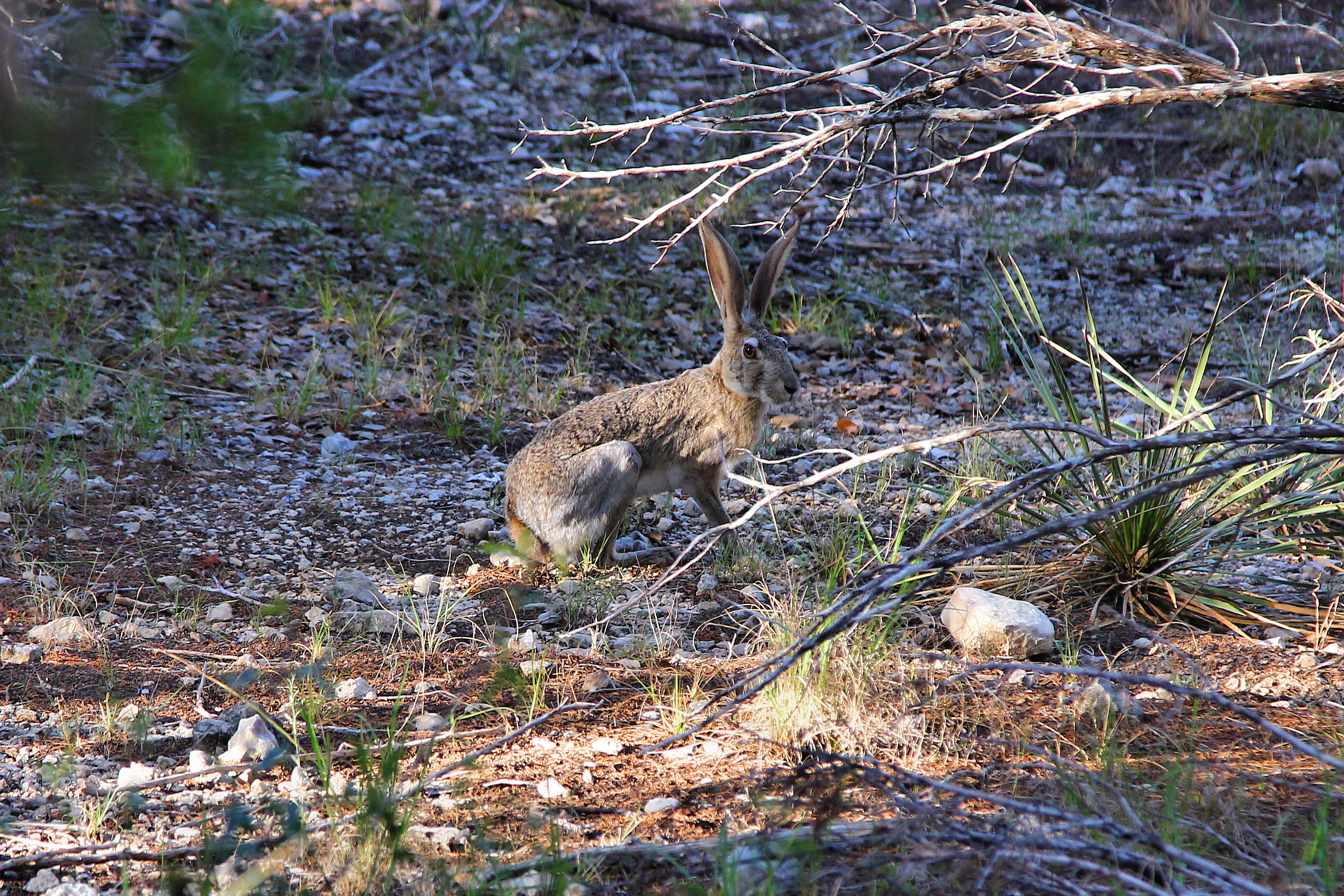
A jackrabbit checking us out.

The park contains a diverse variety of wildlife. Common mammals include white-tailed deer, axis deer, black-tailed jackrabbit, porcupine, ringtail, fox squirrel, gray fox and nine-banded armadillo. The venomous western diamondback rattlesnake, and coral snake exist in the park. Monarch butterfly migrate through the park in October and wild turkey come to roost from October through March.

There are four bird blinds in the park. Birdwatchers have recorded more than 250 species over the years. Common birds sighted in the park include northern cardinal, northern mockingbird, white-winged dove, Inca dove, black vulture, red-tailed hawk, house finch, Carolina chickadee, black-crested titmouse, and chipping sparrow. Endangered golden-cheeked warbler nest in the backcountry of the park each spring and summer.

=== Plants ===
Some plants documented in the park include chinkapin oak, plateau live oak, scaly-bark oak, pecan, cedar elm, honey mesquite, Buckley's yucca, frostweed, Mormon tea, agarita, tasajillo, Spanish dagger, Texas sotol and prickly pear cactus. The park also contains the endangered Tobusch fishhook cactus.

== Activities ==
The park draws visitors for water sports such as tubing, swimming, canoeing and kayaking. Park guests can fish in the South Llano River or Buck Lake, an oxbow lake in the park. There are over seventeen miles of hiking trails in the park with many also designated for cycling. Stargazing opportunities abound as the park is a designated International Dark Sky Park. Camping spaces for tents and recreational vehicles are available

== See also ==
- List of Texas state parks
- Walter Buck Wildlife Management Area
