= Gunter Independent School District =

School district in Texas, United States

Address
- 213 N. Preston Road Gunter, TX, USA ESC Region 10
- Coordinates: 33°26′55″N 96°44′38″W

District information
- Type: Independent School District
- Motto: The Foundation for a Successful Future
- Grades: PK-12
- Established: 1911; 115 years ago
- Superintendent: Dr. Brandon Enos
- Governing agency: Texas Education Agency
- Schools: 3
- NCES District ID: 4821960

Students and staff
- Students: 1,154 (2025-26)
- Athletic conference: UIL Class AAA
- District mascot: Tigers
- Colors: Blue, White, & Black

Other information
- Website: www.gunterisd.org

Gunter Independent School District (Gunter ISD, GISD) is a public school district based in Gunter, Texas, United States. Covering 66 square miles, Gunter ISD is primarily located in Grayson County, with a small portion extending into Collin County, and serves the City of Gunter and surrounding areas.

As of 2026, Gunter ISD operates three campuses, including one high school, one middle school, and one elementary school. The district most recently received a B rating from the Texas Education Agency (TEA).

GISD previously served high school students from the neighboring Tioga Independent School District, however, Tioga began adding high school grades in 2012-2013 and completed doing so in 2015-2016.

== Schools ==
- Gunter Elementary (PK-4), 2008-2009 TEA rating: Exemplary
- Gunter Middle (5-8), 2008-2009 TEA rating: Exemplary
- Gunter High (9-12), 2008-2009 TEA rating: Exemplary

=== Competitive programs ===
In addition to typical University Interscholastic League competitive sports and academic programs common to schools of its size in Texas, Gunter High School has participated in the BEST Robotics program since 1993, winning state titles in 1995, 1998, and 1999.

Baseball

- State Champion - 1994 (1A), 1998 (2A),
- State Runner Up - 1991 (1A)
- State Semifinalist - 1985 (1A), 1997 (2A), 2000 (2A), 2001 (2A), 2021 (3A), 2022 (3A)

Football

- State Champion - 2016 (3A D2), 2019 (3A D2), 2022 (3A D2), 2023 (3A D2), 2024 (3A/D2)
- State Runner Up - 2017 (3A D2), 2021 (3A D2)

== Students ==
=== Academics ===
STAAR - Percent at Level II Satisfactory Standard or Above (Sum of All Grades Tested)
Subject	Gunter ISD	Region 10	State of Texas
Reading	92%	74%	73%
Mathematics	90%	77%	76%
Writing	90%	71%	69%
Science	88%	80%	79%
Soc. Studies	85%	80%	77%
All Tests	90%	76%	75%

Students in Gunter typically outperform local region and statewide averages on standardized tests. In 2015-2016 State of Texas Assessments of Academic Readiness (STAAR) results, 90% of students in Gunter ISD met Level II Satisfactory standards, compared with 76% in Region 10 and 75% in the state of Texas. The average SAT score of the class of 2015 was 1524, and the average ACT score was 22.3.

=== Demographics ===
In the 2015-2016 school year, the school district had a total of 822 students, ranging from early childhood education and pre-kindergarten through grade 12. The class of 2015 included 73 graduates; the annual drop-out rate across grades 9-12 was less than 1%.

As of the 2015-2016 school year, the ethnic distribution of the school district was 72.9% White, 21.9% Hispanic, 1.1% American Indian, 0.5% African American, 0.5% Asian, 0.0% Pacific Islander, and 3.2% from two or more races. Economically disadvantaged students made up 29.9% of the student body.
