= Tioga, Texas =

- Town
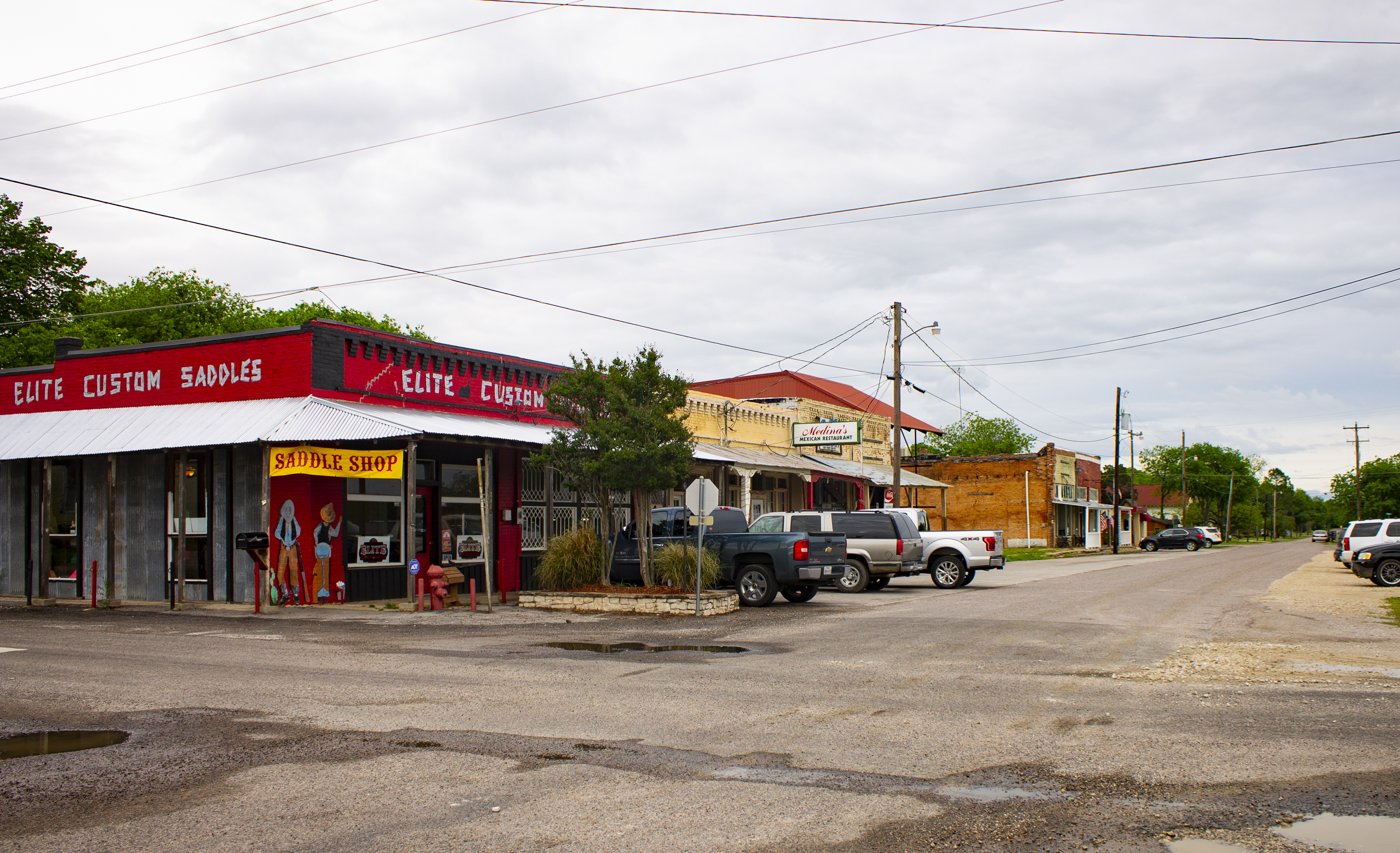
- Tioga in 2016

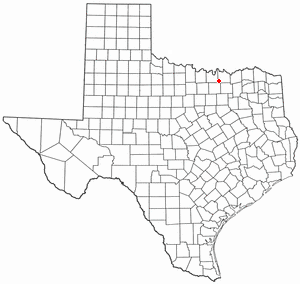
- Location of Tioga, Texas

- Coordinates: 33°28′22″N 96°54′57″W
- Country: United States
- State: Texas
- County: Grayson

Area
  - Town: 1.72 sq mi (4.46 km^{2})
  - Land: 1.70 sq mi (4.41 km^{2})
  - Water: 0.019 sq mi (0.05 km^{2})
  - Metro: 979 sq mi (2,536 km^{2})
- Elevation: 665 ft (203 m)

Population (2020)
  - Town: 1,142
  - Density: 671/sq mi (259/km^{2})
- Time zone: UTC-6 (Central (CST))
  - Summer (DST): UTC-5 (CDT)
- ZIP code: 76271
- Area code: 940
- FIPS code: 48-73112
- GNIS feature ID: 2413392
- Website: https://www.tiogatx.gov/

Tioga is a town in Grayson County, Texas, United States. The population was 1,142 at the 2020 census. It is part of the Sherman–Denison Metropolitan Statistical Area.

== History ==
The town was named for the Tioga Native American tribe of New York.

== Geography ==
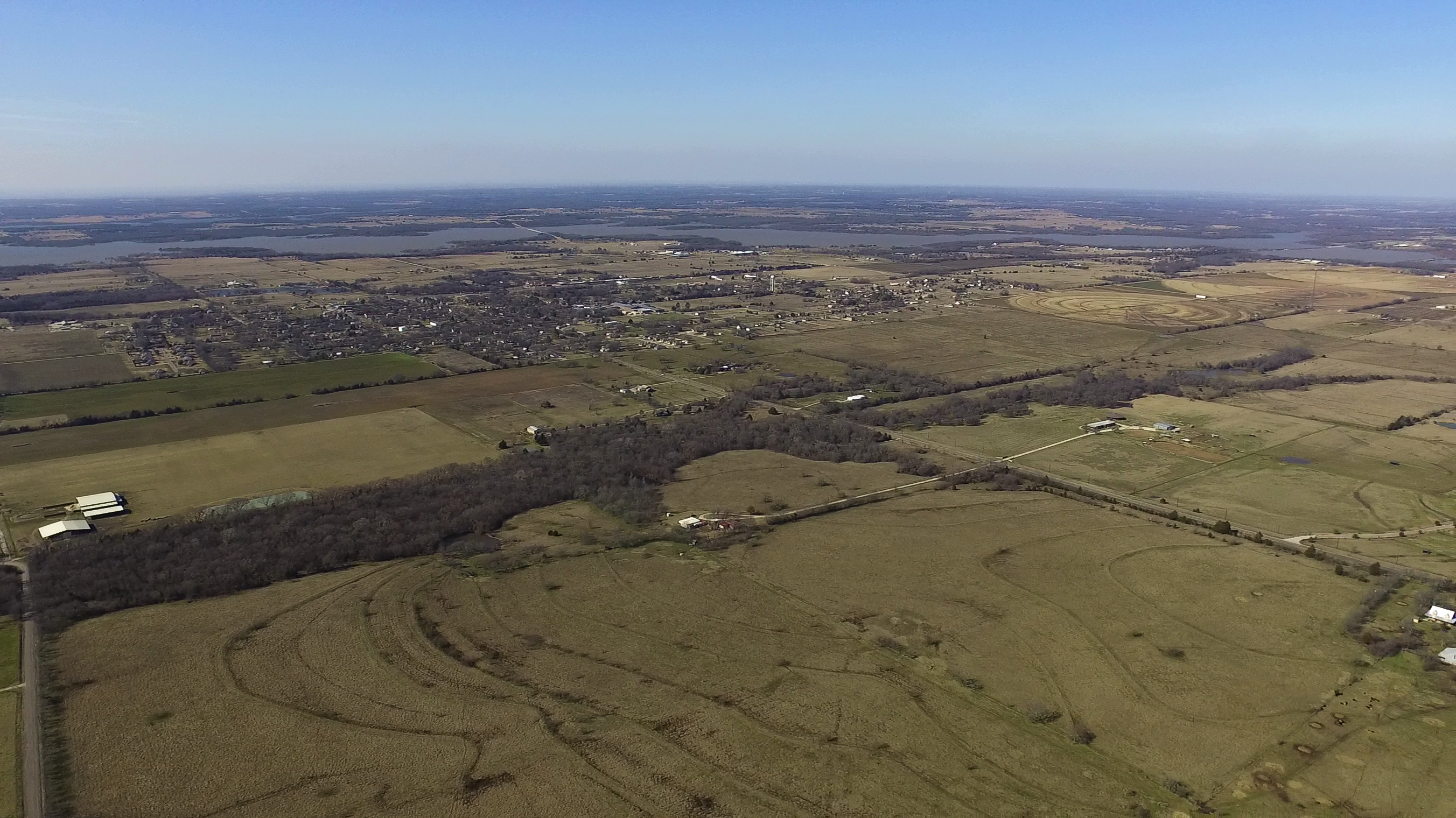
Tioga, TX aerial view

According to the United States Census Bureau, the town has a total area of 1.2 square miles (3.1 km^{2}), of which 1.2 square miles (3.1 km^{2}) is land and 0.81% is water.

== Demographics ==
Historical population
Census	Pop.	Note	%±
1910	797		—
1920	777		−2.5%
1930	591		−23.9%
1940	638		8.0%
1950	529		−17.1%
1960	403		−23.8%
1970	456		13.2%
1980	511		12.1%
1990	625		22.3%
2000	754		20.6%
2010	803		6.5%
2020	1,142		42.2%
U.S. Decennial Census

As of the census of 2000, there were 754 people, 291 households, and 197 families residing in the town. The population density was 611.7 inhabitants per square mile (236.2/km^{2}). There were 314 housing units at an average density of 254.8 per square mile (98.4/km^{2}). The racial makeup of the town was 93.90% White, 0.40% African American, 0.27% Native American, 1.19% Asian, 2.39% from other races, and 1.86% from two or more races. Hispanic or Latino of any race were 13.13% of the population.

There were 291 households, out of which 32.3% had children under the age of 18 living with them, 55.7% were married couples living together, 8.2% had a female householder with no husband present, and 32.0% were non-families. 25.8% of all households were made up of individuals, and 11.3% had someone living alone who was 65 years of age or older. The average household size was 2.59 and the average family size was 3.19.

In the town, the population was spread out, with 26.3% under the age of 18, 9.0% from 18 to 24, 32.1% from 25 to 44, 20.3% from 45 to 64, and 12.3% who were 65 years of age or older. The median age was 35 years. For every 100 females, there were 101.1 males. For every 100 females age 18 and over, there were 94.4 males.

The median income for a household in the town was $37,153, and the median income for a family was $44,688. Males had a median income of $29,200 versus $27,778 for females. The per capita income for the town was $17,373. About 5.0% of families and 6.4% of the population were below the poverty line, including 3.9% of those under age 18 and 14.0% of those age 65 or over.

== Education ==
The Tioga Independent School District serves local students.

Until the 2012–2013 school year, the district served students in grades Pre-Kindergarten through eight; students in grades nine through twelve attended Gunter High School in the neighboring Gunter Independent School District. During the 2012–2013 school year, the district began phasing in a high school curriculum, beginning with the 9th grade and adding one grade each of the following years, until the 2015–2016 school year when the school had its first graduating class.

== Notable people ==
- Gene Autry, movie star known as the "Singing Cowboy"; born in Tioga
- Randy Travis, country music singer; moved to a ranch in Tioga
