= Lease purchase contract =

Type of purchase agreement

A Lease-Purchase Contract, also known as a lease purchase agreement or rent-to-own agreement, allows consumers to obtain durable goods or rent-to-own real estate without entering into a standard credit contract. It is a shortened name for a lease with option to purchase contract. For real estate, a lease purchase contract combines elements of a traditional rental agreement with an exclusive right of first refusal option for later purchase of the home.

Example of a lease with option to purchase contract for real estate

== Elements ==
Elements of a lease purchase contract typically include:

- Property value - The agreed sale price of the property.
- Duration - The time frame of the agreement.
- Monthly payment - How much the lessor will be paying monthly.
- Rent credit - How much of the lessor's monthly payment will go to the eventual purchase price at the end of the lease.

The contract will also generally include terms that relate to repairs and maintenance and, for real estate transactions, how such expenses such as property taxes and homeowner association fees will be paid.

== Transaction Structure ==
In a standard Lease-Purchase Contract, the two parties agree to a lease period during which rent is paid, and the terms of the sale at the end of the lease period, including sale price. Often, the contract is structured in two parts, one representing the lease term and the other a contract of sale.

As is usually stated in the lease purchase contract, the option fee and accrued rent credit are both non-refundable should the tenant/buyer decide to walk at the end of the lease. The tenant/buyer is released from responsibility for the sale, and the landlord/seller is responsible for finding new tenants.

In simpler terms a LOA or LPA is to take over a property for little to no money down as an agreement to pay for a property later giving the incentive of Guaranteed monthly payments to the other party so you can take control of a property and generate monthly income from it with the (option not the obligation) to buy the property in an average of 5-8 years time from the agreed upon deal.

A LOA or LPA is an exceptionally popular property investment as you can profit by monthly rents from tenants and purchase the property at an agreed amount and then you can sell with a possible high profit from capital appreciation, pulling out all your money out having a maximum profit and an infinite ROI.

A LOA/LPA is especially popular to people in the UK and has created hundreds of thousands of millionaires over the last 30+ years in the UK alone.

== Real estate ==
In real estate transactions, a lease purchase contract combines elements of a traditional rental agreement with an exclusive right of first refusal option for later purchase on the home.

Combines elements of a traditional rental agreement with an exclusive right of first refusal option for later purchase on the home. It is a shortened name for Lease with Option to Purchase Contract.

The lease purchase agreement expounds upon what responsibilities the tenant/buyer and landlord/seller undertake during the course of the lease. This contract should describe any option fee and how much of the monthly payment will be credited to the down-payment for the purchase of the home at the end of the lease.

At the end of the lease-term, the tenant/buyer has the option to purchase the house. The lump sum accrued from the initial deposit and the rent credit are only released to the buyer as down-payment on the house should the tenant/buyer decide to proceed with the purchase. The tenant/buyer is responsible for securing the necessary mortgage loan to finalize the purchase of the home.

Should the tenant/buyer be unable to purchase the house due to a lack of financing, the tenant and landlord can agree to extend the option period, convert the lease purchase contract into a traditional rental agreement, or end the contract with the tenant moving out and the landlord seeking other renters or buyers.

== Benefits ==
Lease-purchase contract agreements may meet the needs of a buyer and seller in a manner that cannot be accomplished through a traditional credit transaction. For example, lease-purchase contracts are popular with buyers who have poor credit scores, lower savings for down payments, or people who cannot qualify for a traditional loan at the time they need to acquire property.

== Controversy ==
In the United States, when credits are applied to a purchase price the agreement becomes a financing contract and these contracts have been identified as predatory lending arrangements under the Dodd-Frank Act. Under this federal law any financing arrangement requires the purchaser of an owner occupied dwelling (one to four living units) is to qualify for any financing contract with a registered Mortgage Loan Originator. There are exemptions under this federal law for homeowners financing their primary residence, those in the business of real estate such as landlords are considered dealers. In all states, rent to own arrangements are no longer compliant with federal financing requirements.

Some vendors in rent-to-own transactions target vulnerable families for rent-to-own contracts, then threaten them with criminal charges in order to coerce payments that the families are struggling to afford.

For real estate transactions, alternative financing approaches such as lease-to-own carry fewer consumer protections than traditional financing, and typically involve a higher cost for the buyer.

Commercial loan arrangements are exempt from the Dodd-Frank Act, as a landlord might rent to own a property for the purpose of sub-letting to a tenant. This arrangement is not a popular arrangement but may be accomplished legally.

== Worldwide ==
=== New Zealand ===
Auckland’s special housing area is subsidized by the Housing Foundation, providing homes for young families. Under their program, tenants pay rent on their homes for the first five years, then transition into paying mortgage payments. The Waimahia Inlet flagship development will see 282 new homes built over the next three years.

=== Nigeria ===
The Lagos State Home-Ownership Mortgage Scheme (LagosHOMS) is a rent-to-own housing program that targets people who currently cannot afford a mortgage, but given will be able to. Tenants are expected to pay rent for a period of time, after which they are invited to transition into mortgage payments. The program is designed with young professionals in mind, including teachers and junior public servants. The program has produced well over 200 new homeowners in the city.
