= Texas's 26th congressional district =

U.S. House district for Texas

Coordinates: 33°11′05″N 97°08′03″W

- Interactive map of district boundaries
- Representative: Brandon Gill; R–Flower Mound
- Distribution: 93.4% urban; 6.6% rural
- Population (2025): 904,724
- Median household income: $125,653
- Ethnicity: 56.6% White; 19.2% Hispanic; 9.8% Asian; 8.9% Black; 4.6% Two or more races; 0.9% other
- Cook PVI: R+11

Texas' 26th congressional district of the United States House of Representatives includes rural Cooke County to the north and some of Wise County to the West and includes parts of Denton County, including Flower Mound, Lewisville and parts of Corinth, Carrollton, Little Elm and The Colony. The current Representative is Brandon Gill. The district is best known as the seat of former House Majority Leader Dick Armey.

== History ==
The district was created as a result of the redistricting cycle after the 1980 census, due to the population growth in Texas and Denton County, specifically in its southern sector. Since its creation, the district has been based in Denton County, one of Texas' fastest-growing counties.

Democrat Tom Vandergriff was the first person to represent the district, winning in 1982. Vandergriff narrowly lost to Republican Dick Armey in 1984, and the seat has continuously been held by Republicans ever since. Indeed, since Vandergriff's defeat in 1984, no Democrat has crossed the 40 percent mark. As Denton County has become overwhelmingly Republican in recent years (all but one county officeholder is Republican, as are all members of the Texas Legislature representing the county), the 26th district is considered a "safe seat" for the GOP.

From 2013 to 2023, after the 2010 redistricting, the 26th district included most of Denton County (except the southeast portion) and a portion of north central Tarrant County.

However, the district has been trending Democrat in recent years. Donald Trump carried it by 14 points in 2020, while Mitt Romney had carried it by 37 in 2012.

After the 2020 census, rapid growth resulted in significant changes in the composition of the district. For the first time since the district's creation, the city of Denton, the county seat of Denton County, will not be entirely located in the district. Instead, all but a sliver of the city was shifted to the heavily Republican Panhandle-based 13th district. The 26th also lost its small share of Frisco. To make up for the loss of population, portions of Wise County and all of Cooke County were drawn into the district. Lewisville will become the largest city entirely in the district.

Denton had become increasingly friendly to Democrats in recent years, and voting trends suggested that under the previous map, the 26th could have potentially become competitive. The redrawn 26th, on the other hand, is considered slightly more Republican than its predecessor.

== Recent election results from statewide races ==
=== 2023–2027 boundaries ===
Year	Office	Results
2008	President	McCain 67% - 33%
2012	President	Romney 71% - 29%
2014	Senate	Cornyn 76% - 24%
2014	Governor	Abbott 72% - 28%
2016	President	Trump 63% - 32%
2018	Senate	Cruz 60% - 40%
2018	Governor	Abbott 65% - 33%
2018	Lt. Governor	Patrick 60% - 37%
2018	Attorney General	Paxton 59% - 38%
2018	Comptroller of Public Accounts	Hegar 63% - 34%
2020	President	Trump 59% - 40%
2020	Senate	Cornyn 61% - 37%
2022	Governor	Abbott 61% - 37%
2022	Lt. Governor	Patrick 60% - 38%
2022	Attorney General	Paxton 59% - 37%
2022	Comptroller of Public Accounts	Hegar 63% - 34%
2024	President	Trump 61% - 38%
2024	Senate	Cruz 58% - 40%

=== 2027–2033 boundaries ===
Year	Office	Results
2008	President	McCain 66% - 34%
2012	President	Romney 70% - 30%
2014	Senate	Cornyn 75% - 25%
2014	Governor	Abbott 71% - 29%
2016	President	Trump 62% - 32%
2018	Senate	Cruz 59% - 40%
2018	Governor	Abbott 64% - 34%
2018	Lt. Governor	Patrick 60% - 37%
2018	Attorney General	Paxton 59% - 38%
2018	Comptroller of Public Accounts	Hegar 62% - 34%
2020	President	Trump 58% - 40%
2020	Senate	Cornyn 61% - 37%
2022	Governor	Abbott 61% - 37%
2022	Lt. Governor	Patrick 60% - 37%
2022	Attorney General	Paxton 59% - 37%
2022	Comptroller of Public Accounts	Hegar 63% - 34%
2024	President	Trump 61% - 37%
2024	Senate	Cruz 58% - 39%
2026	Senate	Paxton 50% - 47%
2026	Governor	Abbott 54% - 45%

== Current composition ==
For the 118th and successive Congresses (based on redistricting following the 2020 census), the district contains all or portions of the following counties and communities:

Cooke County (9)

All 9 communities

Denton County (46)

Argyle, Aubrey, Bartonville, Carrollton (part; also 24th, 32nd, and 33rd; shared with Dallas County), Celina (part; also 4th; shared with Collin County), The Colony, Coppell (part; also 24th; shared with Dallas County), Copper Canyon, Corral City, Corinth, Cross Roads, Denton (part; also 13th), DISH, Double Oak, Flower Mound (part; also 24th; shared with Tarrant County), Fort Worth (part; also 12th, 24th, 25th, and 33rd; shared with Johnson, Parker, Tarrant, and Wise counties), Frisco (part; also 3rd and 4th; shared with Collin County), Grapevine (part; also 24th; shared with Dallas and Tarrant counties), Hackberry, Haslet (part; also 12th; shared with Tarrant County), Hebron (part; also 4th; shared with Collin County), Hickory Creek, Highland Village, Justin, Krugerville, Lake Dallas, Lakewood Village, Lewisville (part; also 24th; shared with Dallas County), Lantana, Little Elm, Northlake, Oak Point, Paloma Creek, Paloma Creek South, Pilot Point, Plano (part; also 3rd, 4th, and 32nd; shared with Collin County), Ponder, Prosper (part; also 4th; shared with Collin County), Providence Village, Roanoke (part; also 24th; shared with Tarrant County), Sanger, Savannah, Shady Shores, Southlake (part; also 24th; shared with Tarrant County), Trophy Club (part; also 24th; shared with Tarrant County), Westlake (part; also 24th; shared with Tarrant County)

Tarrant County (2)

Fort Worth (part; also 12th, 24th, 25th, and 33rd; shared with Denton, Johnson, Parker, and Wise counties), Haslet (part; also 12th; shared with Denton County)

Wise County (10)

Aurora, Boyd, Briar (part; also 12th; shared with Tarrant County), Decatur (part; also 13th), Fort Worth (part; also 12th, 24th, 25th, and 33rd; shared with Denton, Johnson, Parker, and Tarrant counties), Newark, New Fairview (shared with Denton County), Paradise, Pecan Acres (part; also 12th; shared with Tarrant County), Rhome

== Future composition ==
Beginning with the 2026 election, the 26th district will consist of the following counties:

- Cooke
- Denton (part)
- Wise (part)

== List of members representing the district ==
Representative	Party	Years	Cong ress	Electoral history	District location
District established January 3, 1983
Tom Vandergriff (Arlington)	Democratic	January 3, 1983 – January 3, 1985	98th	Elected in 1982. Lost re-election.	1983–1985 [data missing]
Dick Armey (Irving)	Republican	January 3, 1985 – January 3, 2003	99th 100th 101st 102nd 103rd 104th 105th 106th 107th	Elected in 1984. Re-elected in 1986. Re-elected in 1988. Re-elected in 1990. Re-elected in 1992. Re-elected in 1994. Re-elected in 1996. Re-elected in 1998. Re-elected in 2000. Retired.	1985–1993 [data missing]
Dick Armey (Irving)	Republican	January 3, 1985 – January 3, 2003	99th 100th 101st 102nd 103rd 104th 105th 106th 107th	Elected in 1984. Re-elected in 1986. Re-elected in 1988. Re-elected in 1990. Re-elected in 1992. Re-elected in 1994. Re-elected in 1996. Re-elected in 1998. Re-elected in 2000. Retired.	1993–1997; Parts of Collin, Dallas, Denton, and Tarrant
Dick Armey (Irving)	Republican	January 3, 1985 – January 3, 2003	99th 100th 101st 102nd 103rd 104th 105th 106th 107th	Elected in 1984. Re-elected in 1986. Re-elected in 1988. Re-elected in 1990. Re-elected in 1992. Re-elected in 1994. Re-elected in 1996. Re-elected in 1998. Re-elected in 2000. Retired.	1997–2003; Parts of Collin, Dallas, Denton, and Tarrant
Michael C. Burgess (Pilot Point)	Republican	January 3, 2003 – January 3, 2025	108th 109th 110th 111th 112th 113th 114th 115th 116th 117th 118th	Elected in 2002. Re-elected in 2004. Re-elected in 2006. Re-elected in 2008. Re-elected in 2010. Re-elected in 2012. Re-elected in 2014. Re-elected in 2016. Re-elected in 2018. Re-elected in 2020. Re-elected in 2022. Retired.	2003–2005; Denton; parts of Collin and Tarrant
Michael C. Burgess (Pilot Point)	Republican	January 3, 2003 – January 3, 2025	108th 109th 110th 111th 112th 113th 114th 115th 116th 117th 118th	Elected in 2002. Re-elected in 2004. Re-elected in 2006. Re-elected in 2008. Re-elected in 2010. Re-elected in 2012. Re-elected in 2014. Re-elected in 2016. Re-elected in 2018. Re-elected in 2020. Re-elected in 2022. Retired.	2005–2013 Parts of Cooke, Denton, and Tarrant
Michael C. Burgess (Pilot Point)	Republican	January 3, 2003 – January 3, 2025	108th 109th 110th 111th 112th 113th 114th 115th 116th 117th 118th	Elected in 2002. Re-elected in 2004. Re-elected in 2006. Re-elected in 2008. Re-elected in 2010. Re-elected in 2012. Re-elected in 2014. Re-elected in 2016. Re-elected in 2018. Re-elected in 2020. Re-elected in 2022. Retired.	2013–2023 Parts of Denton and Tarrant
Michael C. Burgess (Pilot Point)	Republican	January 3, 2003 – January 3, 2025	108th 109th 110th 111th 112th 113th 114th 115th 116th 117th 118th	Elected in 2002. Re-elected in 2004. Re-elected in 2006. Re-elected in 2008. Re-elected in 2010. Re-elected in 2012. Re-elected in 2014. Re-elected in 2016. Re-elected in 2018. Re-elected in 2020. Re-elected in 2022. Retired.	2023–2027 Cooke; parts of Denton, Tarrant, and Wise
Brandon Gill (Flower Mound)	Republican	January 3, 2025 – present	119th	Elected in 2024. Re-elected in 2026.	2023–2027 Cooke; parts of Denton, Tarrant, and Wise

== Recent election results ==
=== 1982 election ===
U.S. House election, 1982: Texas District 26
Party	Candidate	Votes	%
Democratic	Tom Vandergriff	69,782	50.12
Republican	Jim Bradshaw	69,438	49.88
Total votes		139,220	100.00

=== 1984 election ===
U.S. House election, 1984: Texas District 26
Party	Candidate	Votes	%
Republican	Dick Armey	126,641	51.25
Democratic	Tom Vandergriff (incumbent)	120,451	48.75
Other	Other	2	0.00
Total votes		247,094	100.00
Republican gain from		Swing	{{{swing}}}

=== 1986 election ===
U.S. House election, 1986: Texas District 26
Party	Candidate	Votes	%
Republican	Dick Armey (incumbent)	101,735	68.10
Democratic	George Richardson	47,651	31.90
Total votes		149,386	100.00
Republican hold			

=== 1988 election ===
U.S. House election, 1988: Texas District 26
Party	Candidate	Votes	%
Republican	Dick Armey (incumbent)	194,944	69.27
Democratic	Jo Ann Reyes	86,490	30.73
Write-in	Write-ins	12	0.00
Total votes		281,446	100.00
Republican hold			

=== 1990 election ===
U.S. House election, 1990: Texas District 26
Party	Candidate	Votes	%
Republican	Dick Armey (incumbent)	147,856	70.40
Democratic	John Wayne Caton	62,158	29.60
Total votes		210,014	100.00
Republican hold			

=== 1992 election ===
U.S. House election, 1992: Texas District 26
Party	Candidate	Votes	%
Republican	Dick Armey (incumbent)	150,209	73.08
Democratic	John Wayne Caton	55,237	26.88
Write-in	Write-ins	85	0.04
Total votes		205,531	100.00
Republican hold			

=== 1994 election ===
U.S. House election, 1994: Texas District 26
Party	Candidate	Votes	%
Republican	Dick Armey (incumbent)	135,398	76.41
Democratic	Leearl Ann Bryant	39,763	22.44
Libertarian	Alfred Adask	2,030	1.15
Total votes		177,191	100.00
Republican hold			

=== 1996 election ===
U.S. House election, 1996: Texas District 26
Party	Candidate	Votes	%
Republican	Dick Armey (incumbent)	163,708	73.63
Democratic	Jerry Frankel	58,623	26.37
Write-in	Write-ins	11	0.00
Total votes		222,342	100.00
Republican hold			

=== 1998 election ===
U.S. House election, 1998: Texas District 26
Party	Candidate	Votes	%
Republican	Dick Armey (incumbent)	120,332	88.15
Libertarian	Joe Turner	16,182	11.85
Total votes		136,514	100.00
Republican hold			

=== 2000 election ===
U.S. House election, 2000: Texas District 26
Party	Candidate	Votes	%
Republican	Dick Armey (incumbent)	214,025	72.48
Democratic	Steve Love	75,601	25.60
Libertarian	Fred E. Badagnani	5,646	1.91
Total votes		295,272	100.00
Republican hold			

=== 2002 election ===
U.S. House election, 2002: Texas District 26
Party	Candidate	Votes	%
Republican	Michael C. Burgess	123,195	74.81
Democratic	Paul William Lebon	37,485	22.76
Libertarian	David Wallace Croft	2,367	1.44
Green	Gary R. Page	1,631	0.99
Total votes		164,678	100.00
Republican hold			

=== 2004 election ===
US House election, 2004: Texas District 26
Party	Candidate	Votes	%	±%
Republican	Michael Burgess (incumbent)	180,519	65.75	−9.1
Democratic	Lico Reyes	89,809	32.71	+9.9
Libertarian	James Gholston	4,211	1.53	+0.1
Majority		90,710	33.0	
Turnout		274,539		
Republican hold		Swing	-9.5	

=== 2006 election ===
US House election, 2006: Texas District 26
Party	Candidate	Votes	%	±%
Republican	Michael Burgess (incumbent)	94,219	60.21	−5.54
Democratic	Tim Barnwell	58,271	37.23	+4.52
Libertarian	Rich Haas	3,993	2.55	+1.02
Majority		35,948	22.97	
Turnout		156,483		
Republican hold		Swing	-5.03	

=== 2008 election ===
US House election, 2008: Texas District 26
Party	Candidate	Votes	%	±%
Republican	Michael Burgess (incumbent)	194,849	60.19	−0.02
Democratic	Ken Leach	117,895	36.42	−0.82
Libertarian	Stephanie Weiss	11,002	3.40	0.85
Majority		76,954	23.77	+0.8
Turnout		323,746		
Republican hold		Swing	-0.02	

=== 2010 election ===
US House election, 2010: Texas District 26
Party	Candidate	Votes	%	±%
Republican	Michael Burgess (incumbent)	120,683	67.08	+6.89
Democratic	Neil Durrance	55,182	30.67	−5.75
Libertarian	Mark Boler	4,049	2.25	−1.15
Majority		65,501	36.41	+12.64
Turnout		179,914		
Republican hold		Swing	+6.89	

=== 2012 election ===
U.S. House election, 2012: Texas District 26
Party	Candidate	Votes	%
Republican	Michael C. Burgess (incumbent)	176,642	68.27
Democratic	David Sanchez	74,237	28.69
Libertarian	Mark Boler	7,844	3.03
Total votes		258,723	100.00
Republican hold			

=== 2014 election ===
U.S. House election, 2014: Texas District 26
Party	Candidate	Votes	%
Republican	Michael C. Burgess (incumbent)	116,944	82.66
Libertarian	Mark Boler	24,526	17.34
Total votes		141,470	100.00
Republican hold			

=== 2016 election ===
US House election, 2016: Texas District 26
Party	Candidate	Votes	%	±%
Republican	Michael Burgess (incumbent)	211,730	66.4	−0.68
Democratic	Eric Mauck	94,507	29.6	−1.07
Libertarian	Mark Boler	12,843	4.0	+1.75
Majority		117,223	36.8	+0.39
Turnout		319,080		
Republican hold		Swing	-0.68	

=== 2018 election ===
US House election, 2018: Texas District 26
Party	Candidate	Votes	%	±%
Republican	Michael Burgess (incumbent)	185,551	59.4	−7.0
Democratic	Linsey Fagan	121,938	39.0	+9.4
Libertarian	Mark Boler	5,016	1.6	−2.4
Majority		59,613	20.4	−16.4
Turnout		312,505		
Republican hold		Swing	-7.0	

=== 2020 election ===
US House election, 2020: Texas District 26
Party	Candidate	Votes	%
Republican	Michael C. Burgess (incumbent)	261,963	60.6
Democratic	Carol Iannuzzi	161,009	37.3
Libertarian	Mark Boler	9,243	2.1
Total votes		432,215	100.0
Republican hold			

=== 2022 election ===
US House election, 2022: Texas District 26
Party	Candidate	Votes	%
Republican	Michael Burgess (incumbent)	183,639	69.2
Libertarian	Mike Kolls	81,384	30.7
Total votes		265,023	100.0
Republican hold			

=== 2024 election ===
US House election, 2024: Texas District 26
Party	Candidate	Votes	%
Republican	Brandon Gill	241,096	62.1
Democratic	Ernest Lineberger	138,558	35.7
Libertarian	Phil Gray	8,773	2.3
Total votes		388,427	100.0
Republican hold			

=== 2026 election ===
U.S. House election, 2026: Texas District 26
Party	Candidate	Votes	%
Republican	Brandon Gill (incumbent)	182,648	54.54
Democratic	Steven Shook	147,944	44.18
Libertarian	Phil Gray	4,308	1.29
Total votes		334,900	100.00
Republican hold			

== Historical district boundaries ==
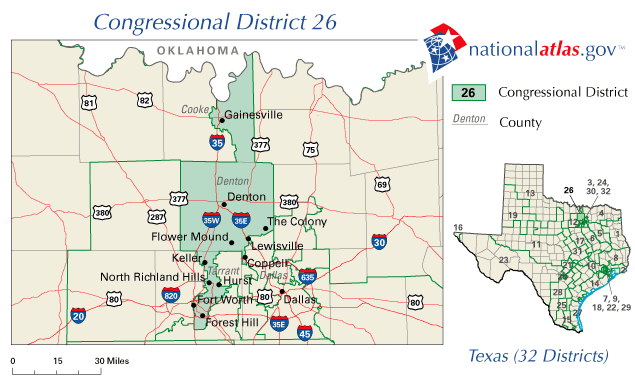
2007–2013

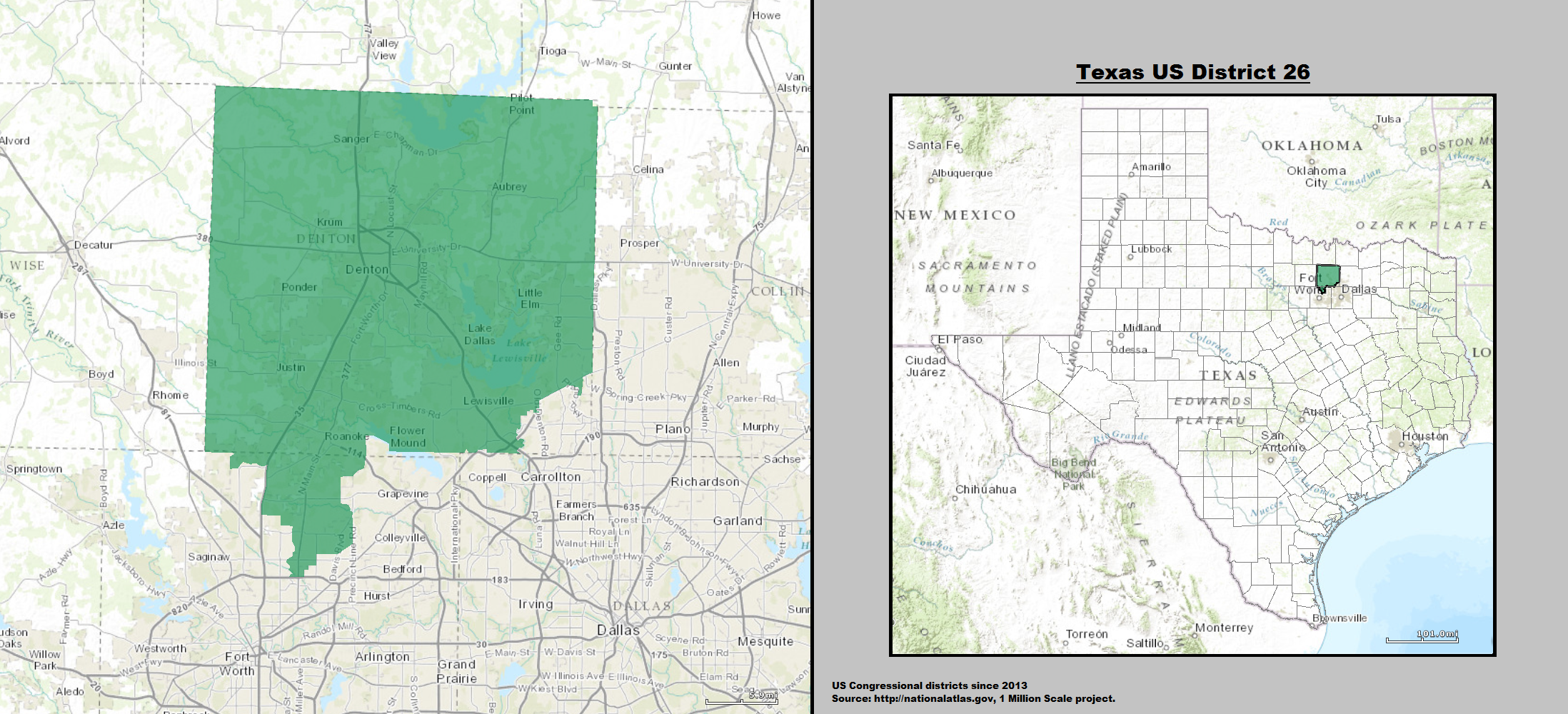
2013–2023

== See also ==
- List of United States congressional districts
