= Farm to Market Road 407 =

Highway in Texas, United States

Farm to Market Road 407

Route information
- Maintained by TxDOT
- Length: 29.792 mi (47.946 km)
- Existed: 1951–present

Major junctions
- West end: US 81 / US 287 in New Fairview
- I-35W in Northlake; US 377 in Argyle
- East end: I-35E / US 77 in Lewisville

Location
- Country: United States
- State: Texas
- Counties: Wise, Denton

Highway system
- Highways in Texas; Interstate; US; State; Former; Toll; Loops; Spurs; FM/RM; Park; Rec
← FM 406	→ FM 408

Farm to Market Road 407 (FM 407) is a farm to market road in Wise and Denton counties, Texas.

== Route description ==
FM 407 begins in Wise County, at US 81 / US 287 in New Fairview. The route travels east into Denton County and into the city of Justin; FM 407 was the primary access route between the former US 77 and farms that were part of the original Icarian Colony, where the city of Justin now sits. In Justin the route is concurrent with FM 156 for approximately four blocks. It crosses I-35W in Northlake and US 377 in Argyle.

Near Bartonville at Country Club Road, FM 407 (locally known from this point as Justin Road) previously turned south before resuming an eastward path; however, as of 2014 407 was re-routed to the north, eliminating the required turns in either direction and the ensuing bottleneck during rush hour congestion (similar to a re-route in 2012 near Lantana, as part of a widening to four lanes, which by-passed a four-way stop). It runs near the city limits of Double Oak, Copper Canyon, Flower Mound, and Highland Village, and is a major artery for new developments between the two forks of Interstate 35 just south of Denton. FM 407 then enters northern Lewisville, where state maintenance ends at an interchange with I-35E.

== History ==
A previous route numbered FM 407 was designated in Orange County from Orange north 2.3 mi (3.7 km) on June 11, 1945. That routing was cancelled on December 10, 1946, and it became part of rerouted SH 87. The old route was given the new number FM 1559, which became part of FM 1130 in 1950, but portions were removed on February 27, 1962.

The current designation of FM 407 has existed since May 23, 1951; the original routing was solely in Denton County, from FM 156 in Justin westward 2.6 mi (4.2 km). The route was extended to the Wise County line on August 20, 1952, and into Wise County to an intersection with US 81 on October 29, 1953. The majority of the length of FM 407 was added on January 6, 1955, when it was extended into Lewisville; this extension usurped all of FM 1172 from FM 156 to FM 1830 and FM 1078 from south of FM 1830 at Bartonville to US 77, as well as the portion of FM 1830 from FM 407 south to Bartonville.

The TxDOT designation of the section of FM 407 between FM 1830 in Bartonville to I-35E was officially changed to Urban Road 407 (UR 407) on June 7, 1995; nonetheless, as with other urban roads, TxDOT continued to sign the route using the traditional Farm Road marker. On November 15, 2018, the section between FM 1830 in Bartonville to I-35E was officially changed back to FM 407.

== Major intersections ==
County	Location	mi	km	Destinations	Notes
Wise	New Fairview	0.0	0.0	US 81 / US 287 – Rhome, Decatur	Western terminus
Wise	New Fairview	1.5	2.4	FM 2264	
Denton	Justin	10.8	17.4	FM 156 south	West end of FM 156 concurrency
Denton	Justin	11.1	17.9	FM 156 north – Ponder	East end of FM 156 concurrency
Denton	Northlake	15.9	25.6	I-35W – Denton, Ft. Worth	
Denton	Argyle	17.9	28.8	US 377 – Denton, Flower Mound	
Denton	Bartonville	20.9	33.6	FM 1830	
Denton	Flower Mound	26.0	41.8	FM 2499 (Long Prairie Rd.) / Village Pkwy. – Highland Village	
Denton	Lewisville	29.8	48.0	I-35E / US 77 – Denton, Dallas	Eastern terminus
1.000 mi = 1.609 km; 1.000 km = 0.621 mi
