= Argyle High School =

Location
- 6601 Canyon Falls Dr; Argyle, Texas 76226; United States; 33.107976°N 97.185811°W

Information
- School type: Public high school
- School district: Argyle Independent School District
- NCES School ID: 480867008769
- Principal: Dona Lumsden
- Teaching staff: 99.66 (FTE)
- Grades: Ninth-Twelfth
- Enrollment: 1,644 (2024-2025)
- Student to teacher ratio: 16.50
- Colors: Red, white and black
- Athletics conference: UIL Class 5A (2021-2022)
- Mascot: Eagles
- Newspaper: The Talon
- Website: Official website

Argyle High School is a public high school located in the Town of Flower Mound, Texas (though it has an Argyle, Texas mailing address). The high school opened up in 1999 and is now classified as a 5A school by the UIL. It is a part of the Argyle Independent School District located in south central Denton County. In 2016, the school was rated "Met Standard" by the Texas Education Agency.

The boundary of the school district, and therefore that of the high school, includes the majority of Argyle and portions of Bartonville, Denton, Flower Mound, and Northlake.

== Athletics ==
Argyle's athletics compete in UIL class 5A. The main athletic venue is Eagle Stadium which can seat 5,000 spectators. In less than two decades of existence, Argyle has seen success in multiple sports with multiple state championships including a designation as national champions in Baseball.

=== Sports ===
Argyle Eagles compete in these sports:

- Baseball
- Basketball
- Cross country
- Football
- Golf
- Powerlifting
- Soccer
- Softball
- Tennis
- Track and field
- Volleyball
- Wrestling
- Bass fishing

=== State titles ===
- Baseball
  - 2015(4A), 2018(4A), 2019(4A)
- Boys basketball
  - 2012(3A), 2021(4A)
- Girls basketball
  - 2006(3A), 2012(3A), 2015(4A), 2016(4A), 2017(4A), 2018(4A), 2019(4A) 2026 (5A/D2)
- Boys cross country
  - 2007(3A), 2008(3A), 2009(3A)
- Football
  - 2013(3A/D2), 2020 (4A/D1)
- Boys golf
  - 2015(4A), 2021(4A)
- Girls golf
  - 2021(4A)
- Volleyball
  - 2015(4A)
- Marching band
  - 2003(2A), 2005(2A), 2008(3A), 2010(3A), 2012(3A), 2014(4A), 2020(4A), 2021(4A), 2026(5A)
- The Argyle High School Marching Band is tied for the most state titles of any school in the state of Texas with 9 titles as of 2026 (tied with Cedar Park High School). They are also the only band in Texas to have won the UIL state marching band championship across 4 classifications (2A through 5A).
- UIL Lone Star Cup Champions
  - 2006(2A), 2009(3A), 2012(3A), 2013(3A), 2014(3A), 2015(4A), 2016(4A), 2017(4A), 2018(4A), 2019(4A), 2020(4A)

== Academics ==
- UIL state academic meet champions
  - 2004(2A), 2006(2A), 2008(3A), 2009(3A), 2010(3A), 2011(3A), 2012(3A), 2013(3A), 2014(3A), 2015(4A), 2016(4A), 2017(4A), 2018(4A)

=== Band ===
- State marching band champions
  - 2003(2A), 2005(2A), 2008(3A), 2010(3A), 2012(3A), 2014(4A), 2020(4A), 2021(4A), 2026(5A)
- State honor band winners
  - 2006(2A), 2009(3A), 2020(4A), 2021(4A)

=== Choir ===
- UIL sweepstakes awards
  - 2018(4A), 2019(4A)

== Notable alumni ==
- Austin Aune, former MLB and NFL player
- JoJo Fletcher, runner up on The Bachelor, The Bachelorette star
- Cole Hedlund, former NFL placekicker
- Parker Mushinski, Pitcher for the Cleveland Guardians
- Nick Ralston, former NFL player
- Grady Emerson, top baseball prospect for the 2026 Major League Baseball draft
