= Northwest Independent School District =

School district in Texas, United States

Northwest Independent School District (Northwest ISD) is a North Texas public school district with its headquarters in the city of Fort Worth, Texas (United States). with a Justin postal address. The school district is named for its location in the northwestern area of the Dallas–Fort Worth metroplex. The school district lies in three North Texas counties: Denton County, Tarrant County and Wise County.

The district serves the cities of Justin, Roanoke, Trophy Club, Northlake, Marshall Creek, Corral City, and small portions of Flower Mound and Southlake in Denton County. The Wise County towns of Aurora, Rhome, Pecan Acres, Newark, and portions of New Fairview also lie within the district. The Tarrant County portion of the district includes Haslet, Avondale, parts of Westlake, Keller, and Fort Worth. In all, the district is approximately 234 square miles.

As of September 2021, Northwest ISD educates over 27,000 students in its thirty educational campuses. Northwest ISD is expected to have up to 35,000 students by the early 2020s, and is the first fastest-growing school district in North Texas. There are 108 active housing communities within the attendance boundaries of Northwest ISD.

For the 2013-2014 school year, the school district was rated as "meeting standard" by the Texas Education Agency, which is currently the highest ranking given under the STAAR system.

== Schools ==
High schools (grades 9-12)
Name	Established	Mascot	Colors	Location	Additional information
Northwest High School	1949	Texans	Red & White	Justin	
Byron Nelson High School	2009	Bobcats	Blue & Black	Trophy Club	
V.R. Eaton High School	2015	Eagles	Navy & Green	Haslet	
J. Fred Davis Jr. High School	2027	Diamondbacks	Maroon & Black	Fort Worth	
James M. Steele Early College High School	2010	Stallions	Gray & Red	Roanoke	

Middle schools (grades 6-8)
Name	Established	Mascot	Colors	Location	Additional information
Leo Adams Middle School	2018	Lions	Navy & White	Haslet	
Floyd Barksdale Middle School	2026	Broncos	Gold & Black	Northlake	
Chisholm Trail Middle School	1998	Bulldogs	Gold & Black	Rhome	
Medlin Middle School	1998	Mustangs	Blue, Black, & White	Trophy Club	
Gene Pike Middle School	1998	Panthers	Red & Black	Justin	
John M. Tidwell Middle School	2010	Titans	Blue & Black	Roanoke	
Truett Wilson Middle School	2012	Wildcats	Purple & Black	Haslet	
C.W. Worthington Middle School	2023	Tigers	Orange & White	Haslet	

Elementary schools (grades K-5)
Name	Established	Mascot	Colors	Location	Additional Information
Samuel Beck Elementary	1998	Bulldogs	Blue & Black	Trophy Club	Formerly Beck Intermediate
Berkshire Elementary	2021	Bears	Blue & White	Fort Worth	
Molly Livengood Carter Elementary	2023	Coyotes	Burnt Orange & Green	Haslet	
Wayne A. Cox Elementary	2013	Cougars	Yellow & Gray	Roanoke	
Lizzie Curtis Elementary	2018	Legends	Navy & White	Fort Worth	
Johnie Daniel Elementary	2023	Dogs	Blue & Green	Northlake	
Kay Granger Elementary	2007	Wranglers	Red, Gold, & Blue	Fort Worth	
Haslet Elementary	1992	Eagles	Red, White, & Blue	Haslet	
W.R. Hatfield Elementary	1998	Cougars	Red & Black	Fort Worth	
J. Lyndal Hughes Elementary	2005	Hawks	Red & White	Roanoke	
Justin Elementary	1992	Jaguars	Blue & White	Justin	
Lakeview Elementary	1983	Bobcats	Blue & Red	Trophy Club	
J.C. Thompson Elementary	2011	Trailblazers	Light Blue & White	Haslet	
Lance Thompson Elementary	2019	Lions	Navy & Green	Argyle	
Clara Love Elementary	2009	Texans	Red, White, & Blue	Justin	
Sonny & Allegra Nance Elementary	2005	Golden Eagles	Red, Black, & Gold	Fort Worth	
Alan & Andra Perrin Elementary	2024	Panthers	Orange & Teal	Fort Worth	
O.A. Peterson Elementary	2008	Mustangs	Blue & Black	Fort Worth	
Prairie View Elementary	1998	Hawks	Green & White	Rhome	
Roanoke Elementary	1992	Rangers	Navy & White	Roanoke	Current campus opened in 2010
Dr. Leigh Anne Romer Elementary	2026	Ravens	Purple & White	Haslet	
Carl E. Schluter Elementary	2011	Spurs	Purple, Silver, & Black	Haslet	
Sendera Ranch Elementary	2008	Longhorns	Green & Orange	Haslet	
Seven Hills Elementary	1988	Wolves	Red, Blue, & Gray	Newark	
