= Corral City, Texas =

- Town
- Location of Corral City in Denton County, Texas
- Coordinates: 33°05′55″N 97°13′49″W
- Country: United States
- State: Texas
- County: Denton

Area
  - Total: 0.15 sq mi (0.40 km^{2})
  - Land: 0.15 sq mi (0.40 km^{2})
  - Water: 0 sq mi (0.00 km^{2})
- Elevation: 722 ft (220 m)

Population (2020)
  - Total: 33
  - Density: 210/sq mi (82/km^{2})
- Time zone: UTC-6 (Central (CST))
  - Summer (DST): UTC-5 (CDT)
- ZIP code: 76226
- Area code: 940
- FIPS code: 48-17024
- GNIS feature ID: 2413245

Corral City, formerly Draper from 2016 to 2020, is a town in Denton County, Texas, United States. The population was 33 at the 2020 census.

The town contracts with the city of Argyle to meet its police, fire, and court service needs.

== History ==
A woman named Geneva Helton and her husband decided to form an incorporated municipality to allow the legal sale of liquor (Denton County does not allow the sale of liquor county-wide, only by local option). The Heltons bought over 20 acres (8.1 ha) of land from a family friend. The two then installed a sewer system and established a liquor store. Corral City incorporated in 1973. Afterwards doublewide trailers and recreational vehicles appeared in the city limits. Candace Carlisle of the Denton Record-Chronicle said that Corral City "prospered" for a decade, but after the early 1990s retirement of Geneva Helton's and the death of her husband, the town, in Carlisle's words, "began a slow decline. Soon, all that remained was a graveyard of rotting doublewides."

According to Carlisle, by 1993, "Corral City looked in every way like a vanquished 'ghost town'." James "Eddie" Draper became the mayor and owner of Corral City. Carlise said that to Draper, "it was a boomtown waiting to happen."

In October 2016, Corral City was renamed to Draper in honor of former mayor James "Eddie" Draper. However, the name reverted back to Corral City in 2020.

== Geography ==
Corral City is located halfway between Denton and Fort Worth. It is in proximity to Interstate 35W and Farm to Market Road 407. Most residents of Corral City live in mobile homes; in mobile home parks, permanent structures are not allowed to be built.

According to the United States Census Bureau, the town has a total area of 0.15 square miles (0.4 km^{2}), all land.

== Demographics ==
Historical population
Census	Pop.	Note	%±
1980	85		—
1990	46		−45.9%
2000	89		93.5%
2010	27		−69.7%
2020	33		22.2%
U.S. Decennial Census; 2020 Census

As of the census of 2000, there were 89 people, 29 households, and 20 families residing in the town. The population density was 2,022.5 inhabitants per square mile (780.9/km^{2}). There were 31 housing units at an average density of 704.4 per square mile (272.0/km^{2}). The racial makeup of the town was 91.01% White, 7.87% Native American, and 1.12% from two or more races. Hispanic or Latino of any race were 11.24% of the population.

There were 29 households, out of which 41.4% had children under the age of 18 living with them, 51.7% were married couples living together, 13.8% had a female householder with no husband present, and 31.0% were non-families. 17.2% of all households were made up of individuals, and none had someone living alone who was 65 years of age or older. The average household size was 3.07 and the average family size was 3.75.

In the town, the population was spread out, with 39.3% under the age of 18, 4.5% from 18 to 24, 34.8% from 25 to 44, 19.1% from 45 to 64, and 2.2% who were 65 years of age or older. The median age was 28 years. For every 100 females, there were 122.5 males. For every 100 females age 18 and over, there were 134.8 males.

The median income for a household in the town was $38,125, and the median income for a family was $38,125. Males had a median income of $28,750 versus $23,750 for females. The per capita income for the town was $14,161. There were 18.2% of families and 25.0% of the population living below the poverty line, including 53.8% of under eighteens and none of those over 64.

== Culture ==
In 2008, Candace Carlisle of the Denton Record-Chronicle said, "In Corral City, neighbors share their homes and their lives with each other. They keep their RV doors open at all hours to celebrate the good times and mourn the hard times with their neighbors."

== Education ==
The Corral City area is located in the Northwest Independent School District. Residents are zoned to Justin Elementary School, Medlin Middle School, and Byron Nelson High School. Before 2010 residents were zoned to Pike Middle School.

== See also ==
- List of municipalities in Texas
