= Kellen Diesch =

American football player (born 2000)

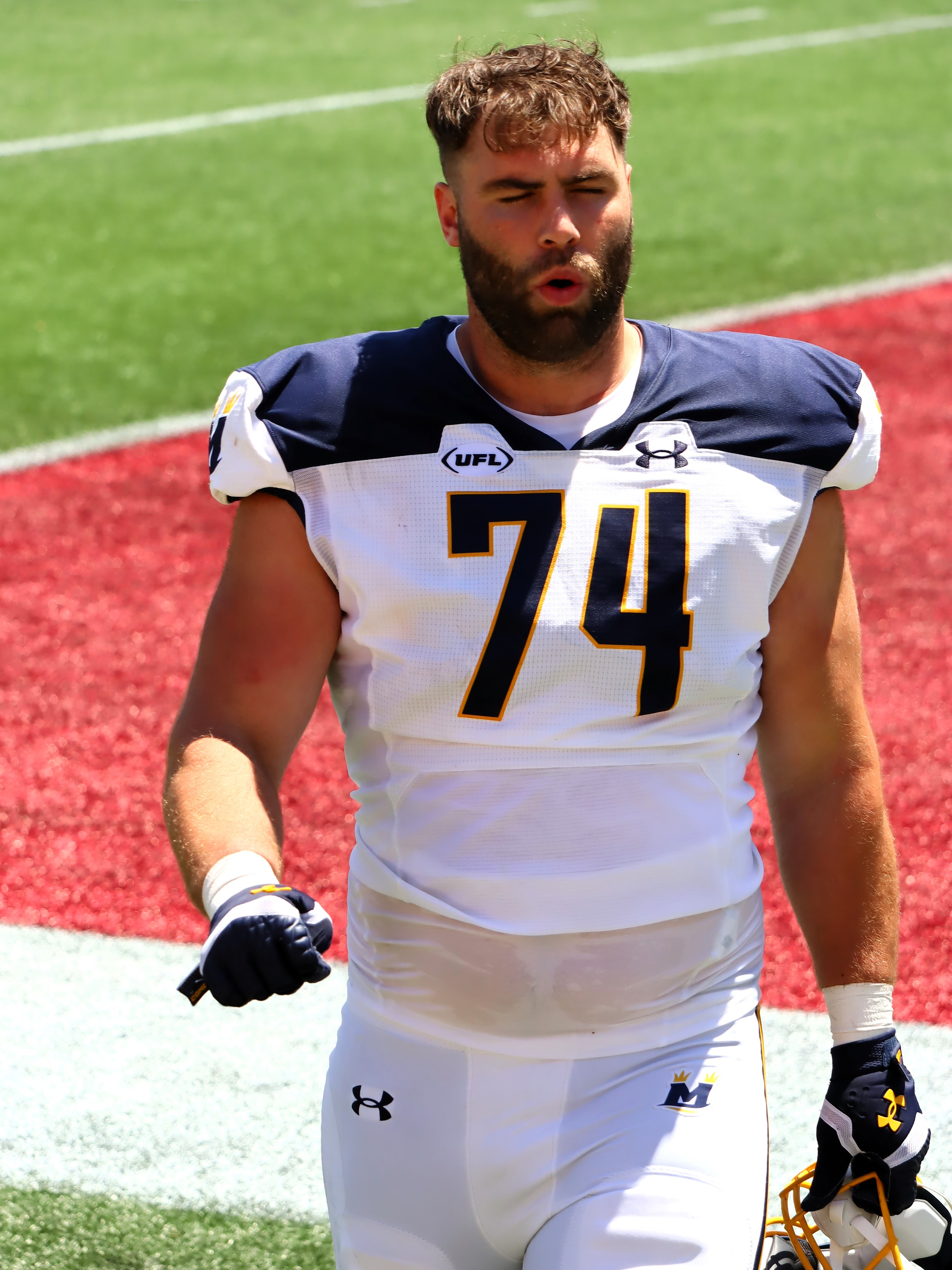
- Diesch with the Memphis Showboats in 2025

Profile
- Position: Offensive tackle

Personal information
- Born: August 23, 1997 (age 29); Dallas, Texas, U.S.
- Listed height: 6 ft 7 in (2.01 m)
- Listed weight: 303 lb (137 kg)

Career information
- High school: Byron Nelson (Trophy Club, Texas)
- College: Texas A&M (2016–2019); Arizona State (2020–2021)
- NFL draft: 2022: undrafted

Career history
- Miami Dolphins (2022)*; Chicago Bears (2022)*; Pittsburgh Steelers (2023)*; Cleveland Browns (2024)*; New England Patriots (2024)*; Tennessee Titans (2024)*; Arlington Renegades (2025); Memphis Showboats (2025); Houston Gamblers (2026); Louisville Kings (2026); Kansas City Chiefs (2026)*; Seattle Seahawks (2026)*
- * Offseason or practice squad member only

Awards and highlights
- UFL champion (2026); Second-team All-Pac-12 (2020, 2021)
- Stats at Pro Football Reference

Kellen Diesch (DEESH; born August 23, 1997) is an American professional football offensive tackle. He played college football for the Texas A&M Aggies and Arizona State Sun Devils.

== Early life ==
Diesch grew up in Trophy Club, Texas and attended Byron Nelson High School.

== College career ==
Diesch began his college career at Texas A&M and redshirted his true freshman season. He played mostly as a reserve over the next three seasons. Diesch announced he would be leaving the program with the intent to transfer after his redshirt junior year.

Diesch transferred to Arizona State as a graduate transfer. He became a starter in his first season with the Sun Devils. Diesch decided to utilize the extra year of eligibility granted to college athletes who played in the 2020 season due to the coronavirus pandemic and return to Arizona State for a second season. He was named second-team All-Pac-12 Conference in his final season.

== Professional career ==
Pre-draft measurables
Height	Weight	Arm length	Hand span	Wingspan	40-yard dash	10-yard split	20-yard split	20-yard shuttle	Three-cone drill	Vertical jump	Broad jump	Bench press
6 ft 7 1/8 in (2.01 m)	301 lb (137 kg)	32 1/4 in (0.82 m)	9 1/2 in (0.24 m)	6 ft 6 3/8 in (1.99 m)	4.89 s	1.68 s	2.85 s	4.43 s	7.77 s	32.5 in (0.83 m)	9 ft 2 in (2.79 m)	25 reps
All values from NFL Combine/Pro Day

=== Miami Dolphins ===
Diesch was signed by the Miami Dolphins as an undrafted free agent on April 30, 2022, shortly after the conclusion of the 2022 NFL draft. He was waived by the Dolphins on August 30.

=== Chicago Bears ===
On September 1, 2022, Diesch was signed to the Chicago Bears' practice squad. He signed a reserve/future contract with Chicago on January 9, 2023. Diesch was waived by the Bears as a part of final roster cuts on August 29.

=== Pittsburgh Steelers ===
On August 31, 2023, Diesch signed with the Pittsburgh Steelers' practice squad. On January 17, 2024, he signed a reserve/futures contract with the Steelers. Diesch was waived by Pittsburgh on May 13.

=== Cleveland Browns ===
On May 14, 2024, Diesch was claimed off waivers by the Cleveland Browns. However, he was waived two days later with a failed physical designation.

=== New England Patriots ===
Diesch was signed by the New England Patriots on August 2, 2024. He was waived by the Patriots on August 27.

=== Tennessee Titans ===
On December 10, 2024, Diesch signed with the Tennessee Titans' practice squad. He was released by Tennessee on December 26.

=== Arlington Renegades ===
On January 30, 2025, Diesch signed with the Arlington Renegades of the United Football League (UFL).

=== Memphis Showboats ===
On April 21, 2025, Diesch was traded to the Memphis Showboats in exchange for OT J. D. DiRenzo.

=== Houston Gamblers ===
On January 13, 2026, Diesch was selected by the Houston Gamblers in the 2026 UFL Draft. He was released by the Gamblers on April 15.

=== Louisville Kings ===
On April 19, 2026, Diesch signed with the Louisville Kings of the United Football League (UFL).

=== Kansas City Chiefs ===
On August 20, 2026, Diesch signed with the Kansas City Chiefs. He was released six days later.

=== Seattle Seahawks ===
On August 27, 2026, Diesch was claimed off waivers by the Seattle Seahawks. On August 30, he was waived by the Seahawks as a part of final roster cuts.
