= Cade Winquest =

American baseball player (born 2000)

St. Louis Cardinals – No. 63
- Pitcher
- Born: April 30, 2000 (age 26); Fort Worth, Texas, U.S.
- Bats: Right Throws: Right

MLB debut
- August 29, 2026, St. Louis Cardinals

MLB statistics (through 2026 season)
- Win-loss record: 1–0
- Earned run average: 3.95
- Strikeouts: 16
- Stats at Baseball Reference

Teams
- St. Louis Cardinals (2026–present)

Cade Ryan Winquest (born April 30, 2000) is an American professional baseball pitcher for the St. Louis Cardinals of Major League Baseball (MLB). He made his MLB debut in 2026.

== Amateur career ==
Winquest attended V.R. Eaton High School in Haslet, Texas, and the University of Texas at Arlington, where he played college baseball for the UT Arlington Mavericks. In 2021, he played collegiate summer baseball with the Chatham Anglers of the Cape Cod Baseball League. He planned to transfer to the University of Oregon for the 2023 season.

== Professional career ==
The St. Louis Cardinals selected Winquest in the eighth round (247th overall) of the 2022 Major League Baseball draft. He made his professional debut for the Single–A Palm Beach Cardinals in 2023, compiling a 3–7 record and 4.87 ERA with 81 strikeouts in 77 2/3 innings pitched across 24 appearances (including 13 starts).

Winquest played for the High–A Peoria Chiefs in 2024, registering an 0–2 record and 3.10 ERA with 28 strikeouts and one save but his 2024 season ended after nine games across nine game (two starts); his season ended prematurely due to a slipped disc in his back. He began the 2025 season with Peoria and was promoted to the Double–A Springfield Cardinals in July 2025. Across eight starts for Springfield, Winquest compiled a 3–1 record and 3.19 ERA with 42 strikeouts across 42 1/3 innings pitched.

On December 10, 2025, the New York Yankees selected Winquest from the Cardinals in the Rule 5 draft. On March 24, 2026, the Yankees announced that Winquest had made the team's Opening Day roster. On April 10, Winquest was designated for assignment by the Yankees without appearing in a game for the team.

On April 13, 2026, the Yankees returned Winquest to the Cardinals organization, and the Cardinals assigned him to the Triple–A Memphis Redbirds. In 33 appearances for Memphis, he compiled a 3–1 record and 4.54 ERA with 57 strikeouts across 39 2/3 innings pitched. On August 27, the Cardinals selected Winquest's contract, adding him to their active roster. On August 29, Winquest made his major league debut, pitching two scoreless innings and striking out two batters during a 6–2 loss to the Pittsburgh Pirates.

== See also ==
- Rule 5 draft results
