= V.R. Eaton High School =

Location
- 1350 Eagle Boulevard; Haslet, Texas 76052; United States; 32°56′30″N 97°23′19″W

Information
- Type: Public high school
- Established: 2015; 11 years ago
- School district: Northwest Independent School District
- Principal: Stacy Miles
- Teaching staff: 172.20 (FTE) (2022–23)
- Grades: 9–12
- Enrollment: 3,273 (2022-23)
- Student to teacher ratio: 19.01 (2022–23)
- Colors: Navy; Green; White
- Athletics conference: UIL Class 5A (2017-18) 6A (2018-24)
- Mascot: Eagles/Lady Eagles
- TEA Accountability: Met Standard (2017)
- Website: ehs.nisdtx.org

V.R. Eaton High School is a public high school in far northern Fort Worth, Texas, with a Haslet mailing address. It is a part of the Northwest Independent School District (NISD).

Eaton, NISD's third comprehensive high school, was opened in August 2015 with grades 9–10. In 2018, they were 5A State Champions in baseball.

== Notable alumni ==
- Ben Roberts, college football linebacker for the Texas Tech Red Raiders
- Cade Winquest, baseball player

== Notable events ==
=== 2018 Walk Out/Race-charged skirmish ===
on April 17, 2018 students planned and organized a peaceful walkout demonstration over the recent Parkland high school shooting, where 19 year old Nikolas Cruz shot and killed 14 students and 3 teachers at Marjory Stoneman Douglas high school. The walkout was planned in advance with the school administration supporting the demonstration as long as it was peaceful and did not violate district policy. To ensure student safety, school officials and the school resource officer were present at the demonstration. However, students opposing the walkout arrived to counter-protest the anti-gun messaging behind the demonstration carrying Gadsden flags and Confederate flags. District officials said there was a "difference of opinions" which escalated into physical altercations. The counter-protesting students began to verbally assault the demonstrators with the use of derogatory language and threats. Afterwards black female students leading the protest violently grabbed a confederate flag out of white students hands. The black students wrestled the flag away and were recorded saying "we don't stand for this here" and "we don't stand for racism." The white student attempted to get the flag back when he was rushed by several black female students who began to threaten and yell at him. From here officials began to intervene as verbal altercations began to break out in several fights between dozens of students. A student filming the incident is heard saying, "Oh, God, I don't think this is a good idea for this school." Fighting continued until officials broke up the event and students began to disperse.

In the aftermath of the walkout, no students were arrested or injured during the altercations that took place. Student demonstrators and critics of the walkout carried over to social media, continuing to argue back and forth for several days. District officials released a statement that same day saying, “Today, a student-led event took place at Eaton High School, with the purpose to honor the students who lost their lives in Florida. Administration appreciates that students came directly to them ahead of time to ensure the event could be managed as safely as possible, Approximately 100 students participated. During the event, differences of opinions were expressed. Administration at the campus is addressing any concerns students have as well as any disciplinary issues.” Ultimately no severe disciplinary actions were taken on any students at the walkout. Despite school officials ensuring the safety of the school, attendence on April 18th dropped to roughy 70 percent from the school's usual average of 98 percent.
