= Marshall Creek, Texas =

- Former Town
- Nickname: None
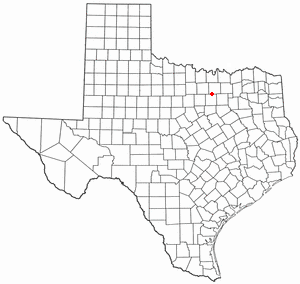
- Location within the state of Texas
- Coordinates: 33°1′4″N 97°12′31″W
- Country: United States
- State: Texas
- County: Denton

Area
  - Total: 0.23 sq mi (0.6 km^{2})
  - Land: 0.23 sq mi (0.6 km^{2})
  - Water: 0 sq mi (0.0 km^{2})
- Elevation: 610 ft (186 m)

Population (2000)
  - Total: 431
  - Density: 1,874/sq mi (723.5/km^{2})
- Time zone: UTC-6 (CST)
  - Summer (DST): UTC-5 (CDT)
- FIPS code: 48-46782
- GNIS feature ID: 1388543

Marshall Creek was a town in Denton County, Texas, United States, with a population of 431 at the 2000 census. Initially an independent town, it consolidated with In late November 2007, Marshall Creek consolidated with neighboring Roanoke, Texas.

== History ==
Original residents began moving into the small area in the late 1960s, attracted to inexpensive country living. The town had no formal government until it was incorporated in 1983 to prevent possible annexation by neighboring cities which would bring higher tax rates and stricter regulations. The town took the name of a nearby park operated by the United States Army Corps of Engineers. The town was originally designed as an affordable location to purchase land for manufactured (or mobile) homes.

== Politics ==
Incorporated as a general law municipality in 1983, Marshall Creek remained, by virtue of its small borders, relatively out of the public spotlight. However, internal strife caused the town to become unstable. According to published reports, bookkeeping by the government was spotty, resulting in losses from unpaid property taxes the town failed to assess. In 1996, the government fell behind in payments to the Trinity River Authority, which removed and treated sewage for the town.

After the September 11, 2001, attacks on the United States, the small town, with its equivalently small police force, lost a sizable contract to patrol nearby Marshall Creek Park. Instead, the Army Corps of Engineers awarded that contract to nearby Trophy Club, which had a larger and more experienced force. In addition, in 2002, police officers who had written traffic tickets for the city on nearby US Highway 377 were revealed to have expired peace officer certifications, thus rendering those citations invalid. The town was forced to repay approximately US$4,300 in traffic fines.

As a result of the loss of income from the Corps of Engineers contract as well as poor records management and having virtually no other revenue source than property taxes and traffic citations, the town filed for bankruptcy under Chapter 9 of the Bankruptcy Code in January 2006.

The town's last mayor before consolidation was James Macy-Simpson.

== Consolidation ==
As part of the May 12, 2007, general election, Marshall Creek voters were asked if they wished to consolidate with the nearby town of Roanoke. This proposition was approved by a vote of 72–18. Roanoke voters decided on November 6, 2007, to consolidate Marshall Creek into Roanoke by an 83% margin. Roanoke canvassed the election on November 19, 2007, and the consolidation became official.

== Geography ==
Where the town of Marshall Creek once was, is at 33°1′4″N 97°12′31″W (33.017727, -97.208625).

According to the United States Census Bureau, the town had a total area of 0.6 km^{2} (0.2 mi^{2}), all land.

== Demographics ==
At the 2000 census, there were 431 people, 153 households and 108 families residing in the town. The population density was 723.5 per square kilometre (1,874/sq mi). There were 167 housing units at an average density of 280.3 per square kilometre (726/sq mi). The racial make-up was 94.66% White, 0.23% Native American, 3.25% from other races, and 1.86% from two or more races. Hispanic or Latino of any race were 14.39% of the population.

There were 153 households, of which 31.4% had children under the age of 18 living with them, 52.3% were married couples living together, 11.8% had a female householder with no husband present, and 28.8% were non-families. 19.6% of all households were made up of individuals, and 8.5% had someone living alone who was 65 years of age or older. The average household size was 2.82 and the average family size was 3.23.

27.6% of the population were under the age of 18, 11.1% from 18 to 24, 31.1% from 25 to 44, 18.8% from 45 to 64, and 11.4% were 65 years of age or older. The median age was 34 years. For every 100 females, there were 108.2 males. For every 100 females age 18 and over, there were 103.9 males.

The median household income was $30,114 and the median family income was $30,938. Males had a median income of $25,893 and females $23,250. The per capita income was $13,972. About 13.8% of families and 15.6% of the population were below the poverty line, including 23.8% of those under age 18 and 7.7% of those age 65 or over.

== Education ==
Marshall Creek was served by the Northwest Independent School District.
