= Lico Reyes =

Mexican-American actor and politician (1946–2019)

Frederick B. Reyes (April 4, 1946 – August 20, 2019) was a Mexican-American actor and politician. Under the name Lico Reyes, he appeared in movies, commercials and a variety of political campaigns, most notably as the Democratic nominee for the United States House of Representatives in Texas's 26th congressional district in 2004. Lico Reyes was a US Army veteran with an Honorable Discharge.

== Early life ==
Reyers was born in Canatlán Municipality, Durango, Mexico. After arriving in the United States he began to study for the Jesuit Roman Catholic priesthood, but switched from seminary training to study agricultural engineering. He graduated from the University of Texas at Arlington, with a degree in Mathematics and double minors in civil engineering and computer programming. Reyes then continued his education by enrolling in Senior Reserve Officers' Training Corps (ROTC). However, by the time he graduated the Vietnam War had finished, and he was not required as a second lieutenant. He joined the Texas State Guard, served several years and received an honorable discharge as company commander, captain (O-3) from the 105th Military Police Battalion, First Defense Group, Company C. He then enrolled in a four-year performing arts course to train as an actor.

He became a citizen of the United States on 14 December 1965.

== Later career ==
Reyes worked in a number of different jobs, including nine years working for the Texas Department of Transportation (in a variety of roles), as an interpreter for the Dallas County Courthouse, a computer technician for the Federal Aviation Administration, and a civil engineer at the Texas Highway Department. He then served as a precinct chair in Tarrant County.

=== Entertainment career ===
Reyes, as his character "Father Vito", a comedic parody of a priest, hosted a variety of different community access cable television programs and live events. He also had speaking roles in the 1988 made-for-TV film Pancho Barnes, 1990 Universal comedy Problem Child, and one episode of Walker, Texas Ranger. He also appeared in many industrial films, television commercials and stage productions.

=== Congressional campaign ===
In 2004, Reyes was chosen as the Democratic Party's nominee for Texas' 26th Congressional District. He received 89,809 votes, or 33%, behind Republican Michael C. Burgess with 66%. Burgess outspent Lico Reyes by ten times ($689,422) in his re-election campaign. Lico received 1,100 more votes than the next highest in North Texas. The second place was for Honorable US Congressman Martin Frost.

During his campaign he advanced the idea of working with Mexico to develop Mexico's oil and gas resources with US technology and financial support, arguing that this would help bring down the cost of fuel, expand the economy in both countries and serve to decrease illegal immigration to the US. Mexico is believed to have the fifth largest untapped reserves of natural resources and is also the fifth largest oil and gas producer in the world.
