= PrimeCo =

American telecommunications company

PrimeCo Communications
- Type: Private
- Industry: Cellular Communications
- Founded: 1995; 31 years ago
- Defunct: 2000; 26 years ago
- Successor: Verizon Wireless
- Headquarters: Westlake, Texas, United States (earlier); Itasca, Illinois, United States (later)
- Products: Cellular Telephone Service
- Website: primeco.com

PrimeCo Personal Communications, L.P. (later known as Chicago 20 MHz, LLC) was a joint venture of Bell Atlantic and AirTouch Communications, and was the first wireless telecommunications provider to turn up CDMA service on the PCS (1900-MHz) band in November 1996. When the company was founded, it had its headquarters in Westlake, Texas. At a later point its headquarters were in Itasca, Illinois.

Primetheus, the mascot of PrimeCo

== History ==
Hailed as the largest wireless phone service launch in U.S. history, the company successfully launched in 19 major U.S. cities. The company's original cell site equipment suppliers were Motorola and AT&T (now Lucent Technologies), and the original telephone supplier was Qualcomm Personal Electronics, a joint venture between Qualcomm and Sony Electronics. The company served parts of the Midwestern and Southern United States. The two primary service areas included Wisconsin, northern and central Illinois, and northern Indiana; and parts of Virginia and North Carolina, as well as the Gulf Coast from Key West, Florida to Houston, Texas. PrimeCo had the license to operate in Hawaii.

PrimeCo won many marketing awards for innovative advertising campaigns. The first "tease" campaign had scenes like a pizza delivery man "beaming" onto a beach a few seconds after the order is placed. The viewer is left to wonder what the product or service is. The tag line was "Someday, everything will work this well." Overall, the tease campaign featured looks into the future, where technology could create a utopian existence, in part brought on by the advent of inexpensive and easy to use wireless PCS phone service.

The original corporate logo contained a red rounded edge box with an antenna projecting out of the top right corner.

The second campaign, which ran after the company started service, featured a bright-pink computer-animated alien named Primetheus, who comes to Earth from planet Primeco, loses his "communicator" (which the Earthlings find and replicate), and then gets into various comical situations looking for it. The company set a new record for the number of subscribers signing up for service the first year. These campaigns were created by Dallas-based The Richards Group, and conceived by Creative Director Timothy Stapleton and Creative Director Brian Nadurak, now of Click Here.

AirTouch received takeover bids from Bell Atlantic, MCI, and finally Vodafone, which was the winner and merged with AirTouch in January 1999. Later the same year, Bell Atlantic approached Vodafone Airtouch about merging all three wireless operations (Bell Atlantic Mobile, AirTouch Cellular, and PrimeCo Communications) into a joint venture to be called Verizon Wireless . Due to FCC regulations regarding duplication of frequencies, the PrimeCo territories were split up with: most of the Gulf Coast going into Verizon Wireless, except in Houston, where Verizon Wireless retained 10 MHz of spectrum and the remaining 20 MHz were sold to AT&T Wireless; Virginia and North Carolina territories sold to CFW Communications, a regional landline telecom provider since 1987, now operating under the name of nTelos; and the Midwest territories split up, with Wisconsin going into Verizon Wireless, and the Illinois and Indiana territories – like Houston – were disaggregated, with Verizon Wireless retaining 10 MHz of spectrum, and the remaining 20 MHz placed into a trust fund. The Illinois-Indiana PrimeCo territories were purchased by Clarity Partners, a Los Angeles–based private equity firm in 2001, who successfully improved the company's operations and later sold it to U.S. Cellular. PrimeCo's operations in Hawaii were sold to Sprint PCS in 1999.

== Headquarters ==
When the company was founded, PrimeCo was headquartered in the Solana Office Complex in Westlake, Texas, a suburb of Fort Worth. The headquarters site was selected in 1995. In 1999 the parties splitting PrimeCo agreed that the former headquarters would become the headquarters of the PrimeCo operations taken over by Vodafone AirTouch. The later version of PrimeCo was headquartered in Itasca, Illinois.

== Popular culture ==
PrimeCo was referenced in Lil' Troy's Wanna Be a Baller song with the lyric "Switched from Motorola to a PrimeCo phone". This was meant to reference the smaller phones allowed by digital cellular service.
