= Argyle Independent School District =

School district in Texas

- Argyle ISD's location in the DFW Metroplex.

Address
- 6701 Canyon Falls Drive Flower Mound, TX ESC Region 11
- Coordinates: 33°6′28″N 97°11′16″W

District information
- Type: Independent school district
- Motto: #TogetherWeSoar
- Grades: PK-12
- Established: 1978
- Superintendent: Dr. Courtney Carpenter
- Governing agency: Texas Education Agency
- Schools: 8
- NCES District ID: 4808670

Students and staff
- Students: 6,601 (2026-27)
- Colors: Red, White

Other information
- Website: Argyle ISD

Argyle Independent School District (Argyle ISD or AISD) is a public school district based in Argyle, Texas, United States. Coving 31 square miles in Denton County, the district serves the majority of Argyle and portions of Bartonville, Denton, Flower Mound, and Northlake.

As of 2026, Argyle ISD operates one high school, three middle schools, and four elementary schools, and is an A-rated district by the Texas Education Agency (TEA).

== History ==
Argyle ISD traces its roots back to the late 1800s when a small schoolhouse that doubled as a church was founded. The Argyle Rural High School District was created in the 1900s by a merger between several smaller schools: Beulah, Lane, Litsey, Pilot Knob, Prairie Mound, and Stoney Ridge. New school building were opened in 1957, 1966, and 1970 before Argyle ISD was officially established in 1978.

In 1999, a secondary campus was established, housing Argyle Middle School with grades 6-9. What was previously called Argyle School became Argyle Elementary School and served grades prekindergarten (PK) through 5.

Argyle High School was opened in 2000, initially serving grades 9-10 before adding a grade each year for the next two years. Argyle HS was located in the same facility as Argyle MS, and graduated in first class of seniors in 2003.

In 2005, Hilltop Elementary School opened, replacing Argyle Elementary.

Argyle Intermediate School was founded in 2008, serving grades 5-6 in the former Argyle Elementary facility. Argyle MS continued with grades 7-8 and Hilltop Elementary served only grades PK-4.

In 2016, Argyle Middle School moved into its own facility in the Canyon Falls subdivision, which was to someday become Argyle High School. With this move, Argyle ISD underwent a grade reconfiguration. Hilltop Elementary served PK-3, Argyle Intermediate 4-5, and Argyle Middle School 6-8.

Argyle West Elementary School opened in 2019 for PK-5 students residing in the west side of the district. On the east side, Hilltop Elementary and Argyle Intermediate continued utilizing the PK-3 and 4-5 configuration.

In 2021, Argyle Intermediate housed all AISD fifth graders, as both elementary campuses where reconfigured to PK-4. Argyle HS and Argyle MS switched campuses after the Canyon Falls location was expanded.

Argyle South Elementary opened in 2022, and all three elementary campuses moved to a PK-5 configuration. Argyle Intermediate was closed.

All Argyle ISD sixth-grade students moved in 2023 to the former Argyle Intermediate building, renamed Argyle Sixth Grade Center. Argyle MS continued to operate as a 7-8 campus. Hilltop Elementary removed PK due to overcrowding.

In 2024, Jane Ruestmann Elementary opened, and all elementary schools returned to the PK-5 configuration.

With the opening of Scott Gibson Middle School in 2026, AISD created two feeder zones for its schools to be placed in. In the west, SGMS served grades 7-8 and 6th graders attended Argyle Sixth Grade Center. In the east, Argyle MS reverted back to a 6-8 configuration. Only Hilltop Elementary serves east zone students.

Future

In 2027, Argyle ISD will reconfigure all elementary schools to serve grades PK-4. Argyle Sixth Grade Center will change its name back to Argyle Intermediate and serve grades 5-6 in the east zone. Argyle MS will continue to operate with grades 7-8, however it will share its campus with the newly opened Argyle Legacy High School. Argyle Legacy will open with grades 9-10 and add one grade level per year for the next two years.

In the west zone, Michael Ball Intermediate School will open with grades 5-6 near Scott Gibson MS. All west zone schools will feed into Argyle HS.

A new Argyle Middle School campus is scheduled to open near Argyle Legacy HS in 2029, housing grades 5-8. Argyle Intermediate will permanently close to students and transition into the AISD Administration Annex. Additionally, Mary Jane Tate Elementary school will open in the west zone.

== Academic achievement ==
Historical district TEA accountability ratings

- 2026: A - 92
- 2025: A - 92
- 2024: A - 90
- 2023: A - 91
- 2022: A - 97
- 2021: No rating given due to COVID-19
- 2020: No rating given due to COVID-19
- 2019: A - 97
- 2018: A - 95
- 2017: Met Standard
- 2016: Met Standard
- 2015: Met Standard
- 2014: Met Standard
- 2013: Met Standard
- 2012: No rating given due to change in ratings system
- 2011: Recognized
- 2010: Exemplary
- 2009: Recognized
- 2008: Academically acceptable
- 2007: Academically acceptable
- 2006: Academically acceptable
- 2005: Recognized
- 2004: Academically acceptable

== Schools ==
Current schools
Name	Grades	Established	Additional information
Argyle High School	9-12	2000	Opened with grades 9-10.
Argyle Middle School	6-8	1999	
Scott Gibson Middle School	7-8	2026	
Argyle Sixth Grade Center	6	2008	Previously Argyle Intermediate through May 2022.
Argyle South Elementary School	PK-5	2022	
Argyle West Elementary School	PK-5	2019	
Hilltop Elementary School	PK-5	2005	
Jane Ruestmann Elementary School	PK-5	2024	

Future Schools
Name	Grades	Scheduled opening	Additional information
Michael Ball Intermediate School	5-6	2026	Originally planned as an elementary campus.
Argyle Legacy High School	9-12	2027	Will share the current Argyle MS campus. Will open with grades 9-10, then add a grade each year.
Argyle Middle School	5-8	2029	
Mary Jane Tate Elementary School	PK-4	2029	

== See also ==
- List of school districts in Texas
- List of high schools in Texas
