= Westlake Academy =

Location
- 2600 J.T. Ottinger Road; Westlake, Texas 76262; United States
- Coordinates: 32.985924°N 97.215162°W

Information
- Funding type: Charter
- Founded: September 2, 2003
- Grades: Kindergarten–12
- Language: English
- Colors: Maroon, Navy Blue and white
- Mascot: Stryker the Blacksmith
- Website: www.westlakeacademy.org

Founded in 2003, Westlake Academy (WA) is a free open-enrollment college preparatory charter school located in Westlake, Texas with an acceptance rate about 10-30%, of in the United States state of Texas, operating under the International Baccalaureate (IB) curriculum. Primarily funded by the Texas Education Agency, there is no tuition associated with attending the school.

They are one of very few schools in the United States offering the internationally-recognized college preparatory continuum of all three International Baccalaureate programs within a single campus.

== Overview ==
Westlake has three main academic programs: The IB Primary Years Programme (PYP) program lasts from kindergarten to fifth grade, while the IB Middle Years Programme (MYP) program runs from sixth grade to tenth grade. The school has also been certified for the IB Diploma Programme (DP), which began at the start of the 2008-2009 school year with the addition of an eleventh grade and now a twelfth grade. The school's first graduating class was in the 2009-2010 school year.

== History and academics ==
Westlake Academy opened its doors in September 2003 when the Town of Westlake officials took advantage of the state of Texas' acceptance of charter schools and thus became the first and only municipality in the state to receive a charter designation. In 2008 the Texas Education Agency (TEA) renewed the charter until 2016. Westlake Academy became an International Baccalaureate World School in 2006, after it was authorized for the Primary Years Program (PYP). Further accreditation followed in 2007 with the Middle Years Program (MYP) and 2008 for the Diploma Program (DP), making it one of only five schools in the United States to offer all three programs, and the only one in Texas. For 2008, the Academy received an ‘Exemplary' rating from TEA for the Texas Assessment of Knowledge and Skills (TAKS) tests, the second time it has achieved this.

On May 23, 2010, Westlake Academy's first senior class of 24 students graduated.

The Academy receives operating funds from the state. The Academy relies heavily on the support of parents and other members of the community. In June 2008 the architectural footprint expanded with the groundbreaking for a new Arts and Science Building, which was operational for the start of the 2009-10 school year. Two new buildings were created and started for the 2014-2015 year.

== Extracurricular program ==
=== Arts ===
The school newspaper, “The Black Cow”, won forty-seven awards at the 2008 Texas UIL State Journalism Competition, the most by any school in Texas. The Black Calf is a version of the original Black Cow, only for the PYP program.

Westlake Academy offers a variety of musical activities, including the Chamber of Strings and Ensemble, which are for strings instruments. There is also Drum Line, for percussionists, which plays at games such as 6-man Football.

=== Athletics ===
Westlake Academy competes in the following High School programs

- Football
- Men's Soccer
- Women's Soccer
- Women's Basketball
- Men's Basketball
- Baseball
- Track and Field
- Cross Country
- Golf
- Volleyball
- Tennis

The school's first varsity 6-man team was in the 2011-2012 year. The Varsity 6-man team has played in 4 State Championships. 2018, 2019, 2020, and in 2022. The team won their first and only TCAF State Championship in 2019.

The Women's Basketball team is coached by Coach Mueller. Women's Basketball TCAF State Champions: 2010, 2012, 2014, 2016, 2017, 2018, 2019.

Women's Cross Country TCAF State Champions:2010, 2011

In 2010-2011 the Women's Basketball team and the Cross Country team were state champions. Westlake Academy competes as a member of the TCAF League.

In 2011-2012 the Women's Cross Country team won state again; and the Soccer team also won state.

In 2015-2016 Westlake created their first all-girls soccer team to compete in leagues.

Baseball - TCAF State Champions: 2014, 2015, 2018, and 2019

The varsity volleyball team was very successful in the state championships 2014-2018 winning state all those years.
