= Roanoke, Texas =

- City
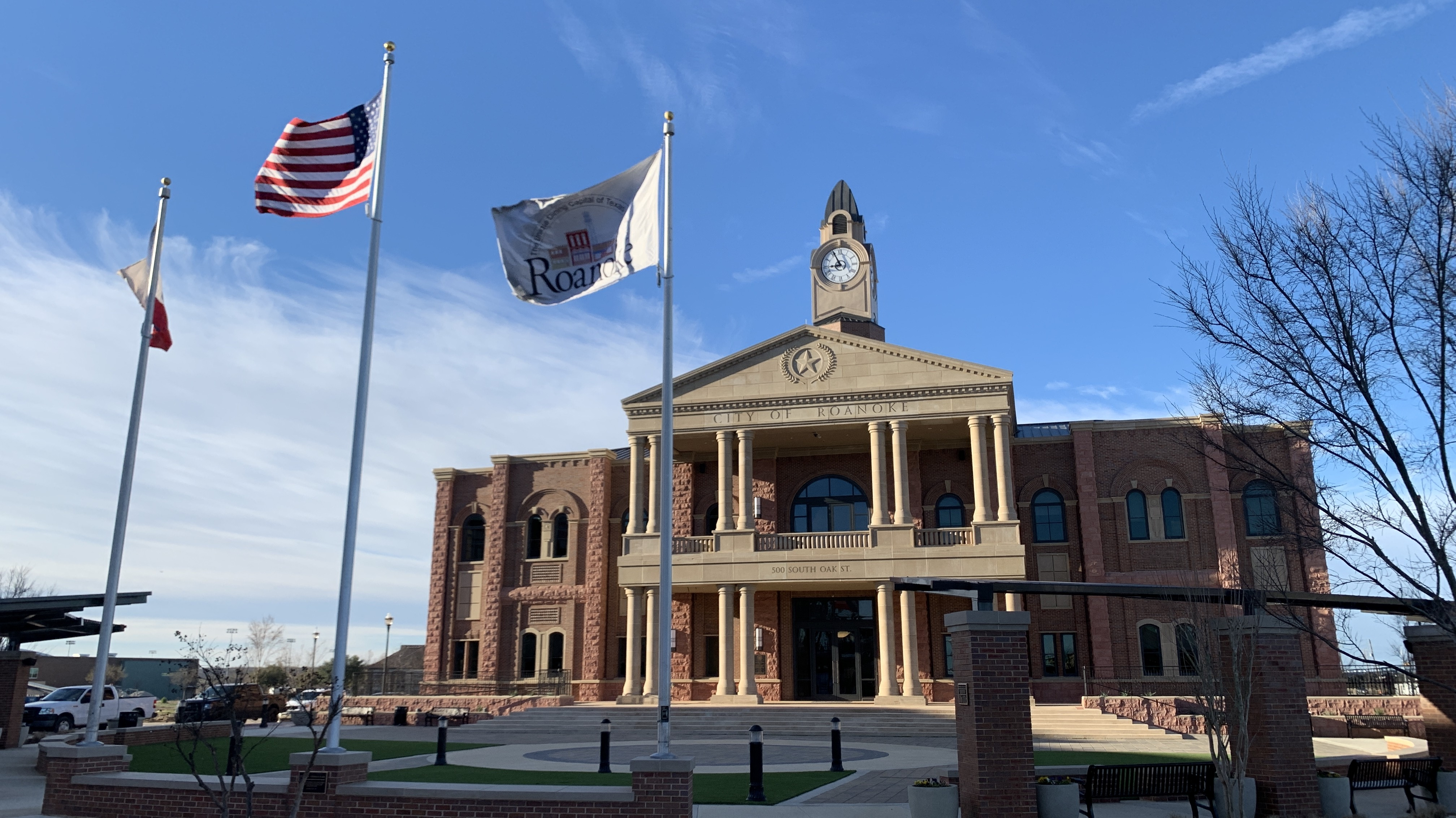
- Roanoke City Hall
- Nickname: The Unique Dining Capital of Texas
- Location of Roanoke in Denton County, Texas
- Coordinates: 33°0′18″N 97°13′35″W
- Country: United States
- State: Texas
- County: Denton, Tarrant

Government
  - Type: Home Rule Charter
  - City Council: Mayor

Area
  - Total: 6.96 sq mi (18.02 km^{2})
  - Land: 6.89 sq mi (17.85 km^{2})
  - Water: 0.066 sq mi (0.17 km^{2})
- Elevation: 623 ft (190 m)

Population (2020)
  - Total: 9,665
  - Estimate (2023): 10,678
  - Density: 1,402/sq mi (541.5/km^{2})
- Time zone: UTC-6 (Central (CST))
  - Summer (DST): UTC-5 (CDT)
- ZIP codes: 76262
- Area codes: 817, 682
- FIPS code: 48-62504
- GNIS feature ID: 2410969
- Website: www.roanoketexas.gov

Roanoke is a city in Denton County, Texas, United States and part of the Dallas–Fort Worth Metroplex. As of the 2020 census, Roanoke had a population of 9,665. Roanoke is currently growing at a rate of 3.77% annually and its population has increased by 76.74% since the 2010 census. A small part of the city extends into Tarrant County. The city was originally founded after competition with Elizabethtown, just off Highway 114. Settlers from Elizabethtown eventually moved to Roanoke permanently, and Elizabethtown is now a ghost town.

The main east–west road through town, State Highway 114 Business, is named "Byron Nelson Boulevard" in honor of the professional golfer who resided in the community. Roanoke is home to many restaurants (its official slogan is "The Unique Dining Capital of Texas"), as well as a hotel that bank robbers Bonnie and Clyde resided in during the 1930s. The Northwest Regional Airport is 2 miles (3 km) north of the city center.

== Geography ==
According to the United States Census Bureau, the city has a total area of 5.3 square miles (13.8 km^{2}), of which 5.3 square miles (13.8 km^{2}) is land and 0.04 square miles (0.1 km^{2}), or 0.54%, is water.

In November 2007, the town of Marshall Creek consolidated with Roanoke.

=== Climate ===
The climate in this area is characterized by hot, humid summers and generally mild to cool winters. According to the Köppen Climate Classification system, Roanoke has a humid subtropical climate, abbreviated "Cfa" on climate maps.

Roanoke, Texas

Climate chart (precipitation, max. and min. temperature)
J	F	M	A	M	J	J	A	S	O	N	D
2.1 65 28	2.1 67 30	3.1 73 38	3.6 78 51	4 83 59	4.1 88 74	2.3 91 78	2.3 92 77	2.7 87 65	3.3 81 51	2.1 72 37	1.9 66 29
- █ Average max. and min. temperatures in °F
- █ Precipitation totals in inches
- Source: NWS, Ft Worth Alliance Airport TX
Metric conversion
J	F	M	A	M	J	J	A	S	O	N	D
54 18 −2	53 19 −1	78 23 3	91 26 11	101 28 15	105 31 23	58 33 26	59 33 25	69 31 18	85 27 11	52 22 3	49 19 −2
- █ Average max. and min. temperatures in °C
- █ Precipitation totals in mm

Climate data for Roanoke, Texas
Month	Jan	Feb	Mar	Apr	May	Jun	Jul	Aug	Sep	Oct	Nov	Dec	Year
Record high °F (°C)	86 (30)	90 (32)	95 (35)	100 (38)	102 (39)	108 (42)	109 (43)	112 (44)	112 (44)	99 (37)	89 (32)	90 (32)	112 (44)
Mean daily maximum °F (°C)	65.3 (18.5)	67.4 (19.7)	73.0 (22.8)	78.1 (25.6)	83.3 (28.5)	88.2 (31.2)	91.1 (32.8)	92.2 (33.4)	87.3 (30.7)	81.1 (27.3)	72.3 (22.4)	66.0 (18.9)	92.4 (33.6)
Mean daily minimum °F (°C)	28.0 (−2.2)	30.6 (−0.8)	38.5 (3.6)	50.5 (10.3)	59.2 (15.1)	73.8 (23.2)	77.5 (25.3)	76.9 (24.9)	64.7 (18.2)	50.8 (10.4)	37.1 (2.8)	28.8 (−1.8)	23.5 (−4.7)
Average precipitation inches (mm)	2.12 (54)	2.09 (53)	3.09 (78)	3.60 (91)	3.96 (101)	4.12 (105)	2.28 (58)	2.33 (59)	2.71 (69)	3.33 (85)	2.05 (52)	1.93 (49)	33.61 (854)
Average snowfall inches (cm)	0.3 (0.76)	0.3 (0.76)	0.3 (0.76)	0.0 (0.0)	0.0 (0.0)	0.0 (0.0)	0.0 (0.0)	0.0 (0.0)	0.0 (0.0)	0.0 (0.0)	0.1 (0.25)	1.4 (3.6)	2.4 (6.13)
Average precipitation days (≥ 0.01 in)	6	6	8	7	9	7	6	4	6	7	5	6	77
Average snowy days (≥ 0.1 in)	0	2	1	0	0	0	0	0	0	0	0	1	4
Source: National Weather Service Forecast Office, Ft Worth Alliance Airport, Fort Worth TX

== Demographics ==
Historical population
Census	Pop.	Note	%±
1890	292		—
1940	485		—
1950	511		5.4%
1960	585		14.5%
1970	817		39.7%
1980	910		11.4%
1990	1,616		77.6%
2000	2,810		73.9%
2010	5,962		112.2%
2020	9,665		62.1%
2023 (est.)	10,678		10.5%
U.S. Decennial Census

=== Racial and ethnic composition ===
Racial composition as of the 2020 census
Race	Number	Percent
White	6,693	69.2%
Black or African American	438	4.5%
American Indian and Alaska Native	76	0.8%
Asian	727	7.5%
Native Hawaiian and Other Pacific Islander	8	0.1%
Some other race	511	5.3%
Two or more races	1,212	12.5%
Hispanic or Latino (of any race)	1,754	18.1%

=== 2020 census ===
As of the 2020 census, Roanoke had a population of 9,665, 3,532 households, and 2,236 families residing in the city.

The median age was 35.2 years, 27.2% of residents were under the age of 18, and 8.1% of residents were 65 years of age or older. For every 100 females there were 99.6 males, and for every 100 females age 18 and over there were 97.6 males age 18 and over.

97.2% of residents lived in urban areas, while 2.8% lived in rural areas.

Of the 3,532 households in Roanoke, 40.9% had children under the age of 18 living in them, 56.4% were married-couple households, 17.6% were households with a male householder and no spouse or partner present, and 20.7% were households with a female householder and no spouse or partner present. About 23.1% of all households were made up of individuals and 5.1% had someone living alone who was 65 years of age or older.

There were 3,839 housing units, of which 8.0% were vacant. The homeowner vacancy rate was 1.9% and the rental vacancy rate was 11.9%.

== Local government ==
The City of Roanoke was incorporated in 1933, operates under a Council-Manager form of government and provides the following services: general government, police and fire protection, emergency ambulance service, road and traffic signal maintenance, water and wastewater operations, parks and recreational facilities, courts, library services, building inspection, and development services. According to the city's 2012–2013 Comprehensive Annual Financial Report, the city's various funds had $37.2 million in revenues, $24.2 million in expenditures, $91.9 million in total assets, $38.4 million in total liabilities, and $12.1 million in cash and investments.

== Entertainment ==
Hawaiian Falls Roanoke, Cinemark Movie Theater, Roanoke Skatepark, and Evenings on Oak Street (Summer concert series every Thursday night on Oak Street).

=== Top employers ===
According to Roanoke's 2022 Annual Comprehensive Financial Report, the top employers in the city were:

#	Employer	# of Employees
1	General Motors Corporation	460
2	WW Grainger	450
3	Martin Brower	450
4	Walmart	400
5	Randall's/Tom Thumb	360
6	Home Depot	325
7	Cardinal Health	270
8	Amerisource Bergen	260
9	Behr Process Corp	240
10	Heritage Bag	210

== Education ==
Roanoke is served by the noted Northwest Independent School District. Elementary school students attend Roanoke Elementary School, Wayne A. Cox Elementary School, J. Lyndall Hughes Elementary School, and Granger Elementary. Middle school students attend Medlin Middle School or John Tidwell Middle School, and high school students go to Byron Nelson High School in Trophy Club. Also, Roanoke is home to James Steele Accelerated High School, an NISD high school for students who want to graduate from high school in 2 1/2 to 3 years.
