= Pecan Acres, Texas =

- CDP
- Location within the state of Texas
- Coordinates: 32°59′44″N 97°29′27″W
- Country: United States
- State: Texas
- Counties: Wise, Tarrant

Area
  - Total: 20.8 sq mi (54.0 km^{2})
  - Land: 18.9 sq mi (48.9 km^{2})
  - Water: 2.0 sq mi (5.1 km^{2})
- Elevation: 696 ft (212 m)

Population (2010)
  - Total: 4,099
  - Density: 217/sq mi (83.8/km^{2})
- Time zone: UTC-6 (Central (CST))
  - Summer (DST): UTC-5 (CDT)
- Zip Code: 76071, 76179, 76020, 76078
- FIPS code: 48-56462
- GNIS feature ID: 2409045

Pecan Acres is a census-designated place (CDP) in Tarrant and Wise counties in the U.S. state of Texas. The population was 4,808 in 2020.

== Geography ==
According to the United States Census Bureau, the CDP has a total area of 20.8 square miles (54.0 km^{2}), of which 18.9 square miles (48.9 km^{2}) is land and 2.0 square miles (5.1 km^{2}), or 9.48%, is water.

== Demographics ==
Historical population
Census	Pop.	Note	%±
1980	1,113		—
1990	1,587		42.6%
2000	2,289		44.2%
2010	4,099		79.1%
2020	4,808		17.3%
U.S. Decennial Census; 1850–1900 1910; 1920 1930 1940; 1950 1960 1970; 1980 1990 2000; 2010

Pecan Acres first appeared as a census designated place in the 1980 United States census.

=== Racial and ethnic composition ===
Pecan Acres CDP, Texas – Racial and ethnic composition Note: the US Census treats Hispanic/Latino as an ethnic category. This table excludes Latinos from the racial categories and assigns them to a separate category. Hispanics/Latinos may be of any race.
Race / Ethnicity (NH = Non-Hispanic)	Pop 2000	Pop 2010	Pop 2020	% 2000	% 2010	% 2020
White alone (NH)	2,126	3,544	3,651	92.88%	86.46%	75.94%
Black or African American alone (NH)	2	76	76	0.09%	1.85%	1.58%
Native American or Alaska Native alone (NH)	35	18	42	1.53%	0.44%	0.87%
Asian alone (NH)	0	24	54	0.00%	0.59%	1.12%
Native Hawaiian or Pacific Islander alone (NH)	0	1	3	0.00%	0.02%	0.06%
Other race alone (NH)	0	2	16	0.00%	0.05%	0.33%
Mixed race or Multiracial (NH)	25	79	248	1.09%	1.93%	5.16%
Hispanic or Latino (any race)	101	355	718	4.41%	8.66%	14.93%
Total	2,289	4,099	4,808	100.00%	100.00%	100.00%

=== 2020 census ===
As of the 2020 census, Pecan Acres had a population of 4,808. The median age was 44.0 years. 24.8% of residents were under the age of 18 and 14.7% were 65 years of age or older. For every 100 females, there were 104.8 males; for every 100 females age 18 and over, there were 101.7 males age 18 and over.

9.5% of residents lived in urban areas, while 90.5% lived in rural areas.

There were 1,620 occupied housing units (households) in Pecan Acres, of which 37.2% had children under the age of 18 living in them. Of all households, 69.9% were married-couple households, 13.0% had a male householder with no spouse or partner present, and 14.1% had a female householder with no spouse or partner present. About 15.2% of all households were made up of individuals, and 6.4% had someone living alone who was 65 years of age or older.

There were 1,753 housing units, of which 7.6% were vacant. The homeowner vacancy rate was 1.5% and the rental vacancy rate was 9.2%.

== Education ==
Pecan Acres is served by the Northwest and Eagle Mountain-Saginaw Independent School Districts.
