= New Fairview, Texas =

- City
- Nickname: "Keeping It Country"
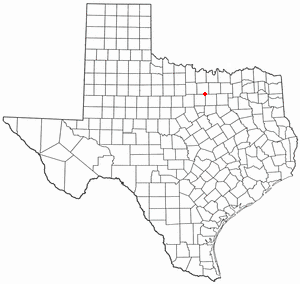
- Location of New Fairview, Texas

- Coordinates: 33°06′56″N 97°27′03″W
- Country: United States
- State: Texas
- County: Wise

Area
  - Total: 16.40 sq mi (42.47 km^{2})
  - Land: 16.39 sq mi (42.46 km^{2})
  - Water: 0.0077 sq mi (0.02 km^{2})
- Elevation: 863 ft (263 m)

Population (2020)
  - Total: 1,386
  - Density: 84.54/sq mi (32.64/km^{2})
- Time zone: UTC-6 (Central (CST))
  - Summer (DST): UTC-5 (CDT)
- Zip Code: 76078
- FIPS code: 48-50920
- GNIS feature ID: 2411231
- Website: newfairview.org

New Fairview is a city in Wise County, Texas, United States, with a portion of it extending into the neighboring Denton County. The population was 1,386 in 2020.

== History ==
Growing from a settlement called Illinois Community (the main highway through the city, Texas Farm to Market Road 407, is named Illinois Lane in remembrance), the city was called Fairview until 1999, when it was changed to distinguish it from several other cities named Fairview in Texas.

== Geography ==
According to the United States Census Bureau, the city has a total area of 15.5 square miles (40 km^{2}), all land.

== Demographics ==
Historical population
Census	Pop.	Note	%±
2000	877		—
2010	1,258		43.4%
2020	1,386		10.2%
2023 (est.)	1,558		12.4%
U.S. Decennial Census

=== Racial and ethnic composition ===
Racial composition as of the 2020 census
Race	Number	Percent
White	981	70.8%
Black or African American	12	0.9%
American Indian and Alaska Native	11	0.8%
Asian	11	0.8%
Native Hawaiian and Other Pacific Islander	0	0.0%
Some other race	193	13.9%
Two or more races	178	12.8%
Hispanic or Latino (of any race)	443	32.0%

=== 2020 census ===
As of the 2020 census, New Fairview had a population of 1,386. The median age was 38.2 years. 26.9% of residents were under the age of 18 and 11.9% of residents were 65 years of age or older. For every 100 females there were 106.9 males, and for every 100 females age 18 and over there were 104.6 males age 18 and over.

0.0% of residents lived in urban areas, while 100.0% lived in rural areas.

There were 458 households in New Fairview, of which 41.5% had children under the age of 18 living in them. Of all households, 60.7% were married-couple households, 17.7% were households with a male householder and no spouse or partner present, and 15.9% were households with a female householder and no spouse or partner present. About 15.3% of all households were made up of individuals and 5.7% had someone living alone who was 65 years of age or older.

There were 488 housing units, of which 6.1% were vacant. The homeowner vacancy rate was 1.7% and the rental vacancy rate was 4.8%.

== Education ==
The city of New Fairview is served by two Independent School Districts – Northwest and Decatur.
