= Northlake, Texas =

- Town
- Location of Northlake in Denton County, Texas
- Coordinates: 33°06′40″N 97°15′15″W
- Country: United States
- State: Texas
- County: Denton

Government
  - Mayor: Brian G. Montini
  - Town Manage: Drew Corn

Area
  - Total: 17.75 sq mi (45.97 km^{2})
  - Land: 17.66 sq mi (45.73 km^{2})
  - Water: 0.093 sq mi (0.24 km^{2})
- Elevation: 650 ft (200 m)

Population (2020)
  - Total: 5,201
  - Estimate (2025): 12,036
  - Density: 189.6/sq mi (73.22/km^{2})
- Time zone: UTC-6 (Central (CST))
  - Summer (DST): UTC-5 (CDT)
- ZIP code: 76247
- FIPS code: 48-52212
- GNIS feature ID: 2413055
- Website: town.northlake.tx.us

Northlake is a town in Denton County, Texas, United States. Its population was 5,201 in 2020. The town is located northwest of Grapevine Lake, about 10 miles (16 km) northwest of Westlake, Texas.

== Geography ==
According to the United States Census Bureau, the town has a total area of 17.0 square miles (44.0 km^{2}), of which 0.077 sq mi (0.2 km^{2}), or 0.57%, is covered by water.

== Demographics ==
Historical population
Census	Pop.	Note	%±
1970	20		—
1980	143		615.0%
1990	250		74.8%
2000	921		268.4%
2010	1,724		87.2%
2020	5,201		201.7%
2025 (est.)	12,036	▲	131.4%
U.S. Decennial Census

Northlake racial composition as of 2020 (NH = Non-Hispanic) (Note: Note: the US Census treats Hispanic/Latino as an ethnic category. This table excludes Latinos from the racial categories and assigns them to a separate category. Hispanics/Latinos can be of any race.)
Race	Number	Percentage
White (NH)	3,470	66.72%
Black or African American (NH)	372	7.15%
Native American or Alaska Native (NH)	41	0.79%
Asian (NH)	318	6.11%
Pacific Islander (NH)	5	0.1%
Some other rrace (NH)	3	0.06%
Mixed/multiracial (NH)	243	4.67%
Hispanic or Latino	749	14.4%
Total	5,201	

As of the 2020 United States census, 5,201 people, 1,331 households, and 679 families resided in the town.

== Education ==
Northlake is served by the Northwest Independent School District and the Argyle Independent School District
