= Newark, Texas =

- City
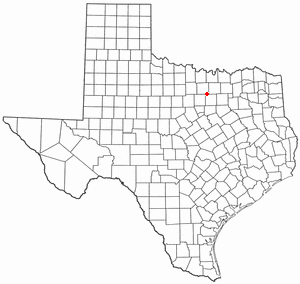
- Location of Newark, Texas

- Coordinates: 33°00′07″N 97°29′18″W
- Country: United States
- State: Texas
- Counties: Wise, Tarrant
- Established: 1951

Government
  - Type: The City of Newark is a type "A" General Law Municipality. The City Council consists of a Mayor and five councilmembers. The Council appoints a City Attorney, an Internal Auditor and a Municipal Judge. Council members also appoint citizens to serve on various Boards and Commissions.

Area
  - Total: 0.90 sq mi (2.32 km^{2})
  - Land: 0.90 sq mi (2.32 km^{2})
  - Water: 0 sq mi (0.00 km^{2})
- Elevation: 686 ft (209 m)

Population (2020)
  - Total: 1,096
  - Density: 1,220/sq mi (472/km^{2})
- Time zone: UTC-6 (Central (CST))
  - Summer (DST): UTC-5 (CDT)
- ZIP code: 76071
- Area code: 817
- FIPS code: 48-50772
- GNIS feature ID: 2411239
- Website: www.newarktexas.gov

Newark is a city in Tarrant and Wise Counties in the U.S. state of Texas. Its population was 1,096 in 2020.

== History ==
According to the Handbook of Texas, settlement began in the mid-1850s, referring to the community as Caddo Village because of numerous remnants of the Caddo Indian culture found along the banks of the West Fork of the Trinity River. After the Rock Island Railroad reached the town in 1893, officials surveyed town lots; the community was named after Newark, New Jersey, perhaps the hometown of G. K. Foster, the civil engineer who helped survey the town. Newark was a prosperous farming community until the 1920s. It regained its status as a retail market for area farmers by the end of the 1940s. In 1951, Newark was incorporated.

== Geography ==
According to the United States Census Bureau, the city has a total area of 0.89 square miles (2.3 km^{2}), all land.

== Demographics ==
Historical population
Census	Pop.	Note	%±
1960	392		—
1970	407		3.8%
1980	466		14.5%
1990	651		39.7%
2000	887		36.3%
2010	1,005		13.3%
2020	1,096		9.1%
2023 (est.)	1,233		12.5%
U.S. Decennial Census

=== 2020 census ===
As of the 2020 census, Newark had a population of 1,096 residents. The median age was 34.9 years, 28.8% of residents were under the age of 18, 13.0% were 65 years of age or older, there were 94.3 males for every 100 females, and there were 87.1 males for every 100 females age 18 and over.

Of the 370 households enumerated by the census, 42.2% had children under the age of 18 living in them, 51.9% were married-couple households, 15.9% were households with a male householder and no spouse or partner present, 26.5% were households with a female householder and no spouse or partner present, 18.3% of all households were made up of individuals, 3.8% had someone living alone who was 65 years of age or older, and 280 families resided in the city.

There were 410 housing units, of which 9.8% were vacant; the homeowner vacancy rate was 2.2% and the rental vacancy rate was 14.6%.

As of the 2020 census, 0.0% of residents lived in urban areas and 100.0% lived in rural areas.

Racial composition as of the 2020 census
Race	Number	Percent
White	796	72.6%
Black or African American	24	2.2%
American Indian and Alaska Native	18	1.6%
Asian	4	0.4%
Native Hawaiian and Other Pacific Islander	0	0.0%
Some other race	98	8.9%
Two or more races	156	14.2%
Hispanic or Latino (of any race)	328	29.9%
