= Bartonville, Texas =

- Town
- Interactive map of Bartonville, Texas
- Coordinates: 33°04′37″N 97°08′27″W
- Country: United States
- State: Texas
- County: Denton

Area
  - Total: 6.89 sq mi (17.84 km^{2})
  - Land: 6.83 sq mi (17.70 km^{2})
  - Water: 0.058 sq mi (0.15 km^{2})
- Elevation: 676 ft (206 m)

Population (2020)
  - Total: 1,725
  - Density: 252.4/sq mi (97.46/km^{2})
- Time zone: UTC-6 (Central (CST))
  - Summer (DST): UTC-5 (CDT)
- ZIP code: 76226
- Area code: 940
- FIPS code: 48-05768
- GNIS feature ID: 2411664
- Website: Town of Bartonville

Bartonville is a town in Denton County, Texas, United States. Its population was 1,725 at the 2020 census.

== History ==
Bartonville was originally part of the Chinn's Chapel settlement, but then it decided to change to a place that was established in 1853 by Elisha Chinn. Chinn's Chapel eventually became three small communities, with Bartonville being the lone remaining town. Bartonville was settled in 1878 and was named for T. Bent Barton. In 1886, a local post office was established, and by 1890, Bartonville had 25 residents, a general store, a gristmill, and a cotton gin, all owned by the Barton family. By 1896, Bartonville's population was estimated at 100, and the town had three general stores. The post office was discontinued in 1906. Slow growth continued, and by 1930, Bartonville had a population of 300 and a business establishment.

In 1960, with cities such as Irving looking to expand northward, local residents feared annexation, so Bartonville incorporated for the first time. The town then included Double Oak and Copper Canyon, as well as present-day Bartonville. Once the fear of annexation subsided a few years later, Bartonville citizens voted for disincorporation.

The present town of Bartonville was incorporated in 1973, and the town has continued to grow as part of the general development of the area north of Dallas/Fort Worth International Airport. It is adjacent to the master-planned Lantana residential development, which is currently not incorporated.

== Geography ==
According to the United States Census Bureau, the town has a total area of 6.3 square miles (16.2 km^{2}), of which 0.04 sq mi (0.1 km^{2}), or 0.83%, is covered by water.

== Demographics ==
Historical population
| Census | Pop. | Note | %± |
|---|---|---|---|
| 1980 | 441 | | — |
| 1990 | 849 | | 92.5% |
| 2000 | 1,093 | | 28.7% |
| 2010 | 1,469 | | 34.4% |
| 2020 | 1,725 | | 17.4% |
| 2023 (est.) | 1,827 | ▲ | 5.9% |
U.S. Decennial Census; 2020 Census

As of the 2000 census, 1,093 people, 382 households, and 323 families resided in the town. The population density was 181.2 inhabitants per square mile (70.0/km^{2}). The 391 housing units had an average density of 64.8 per square mile (25.0/km^{2}). The racial makeup of the town was 97.62% White, 0.91% Asian, 0.55% from other races, and 0.91% from two or more races. Hispanics or Latinos of any race were 3.20% of the population.

Of the 382 households, 36.9% had children under 18 living with them, 74.3% were married couples living together, 6.5% had a female householder with no husband present, and 15.2% were not families. About 12.6% of all households were made up of individuals, and 2.1% had someone living alone who was 65 or older. The average household size was 2.86, and the average family size was 3.10.

In the town, the age distribution was 25.8% under 18, 6.9% from 18 to 24, 26.1% from 25 to 44, 35.6% from 45 to 64, and 5.7% who were 65 or older. The median age was 41 years. For every 100 females, there were 104.7 males. For every 100 females 18 and over, there were 105.3 males.

The median income in the town for a household was $95,259 and ffr a family was $98,140. Males had a median income of $63,750 versus $43,625 for females. The per capita income for the town was $43,706. About 3.1% of families and 4.4% of the population were below the poverty line, including 6.6% of those under 18 and 4.5% of those 65 or over.

== Education ==
The east and south portions of Bartonville are served by the Denton Independent School District and the northwest by the Argyle Independent School District.

Most of Denton ISD Bartonville is zoned to Adkins Elementary School, while a single parcel is zoned to E. P. Rayzor Elementary School. The Denton ISD part is zoned to Harpool Middle School, and Guyer High School.
