= Westlake, Texas =

Town of Westlake, Texas
- Town
- Mottoes: "A premier knowledge-based community," "Distinctive by Design."
- Location of Westlake in Tarrant County, Texas
- Coordinates: 32°59′50″N 97°12′30″W
- Country: United States
- State: Texas
- Counties: Tarrant, Denton
- Settled: 1847
- Incorporated: 1954

Government
  - Type: Council-Manager

Area
  - Total: 6.92 sq mi (17.93 km^{2})
  - Land: 6.74 sq mi (17.46 km^{2})
  - Water: 0.18 sq mi (0.46 km^{2}) 1.35%
- Elevation: 666 ft (203 m)

Population (2020)
  - Total: 1,623
  - Density: 240.8/sq mi (92.96/km^{2})
- Time zone: UTC-6 (CST)
  - Summer (DST): UTC-5 (CDT)
- ZIP code: 76262
- Area code: 817/682
- FIPS code: 48-77620
- GNIS feature ID: 2413472
- Website: The Town of Westlake, Texas

Westlake is a town in Denton and Tarrant counties in the U.S. state of Texas, and a suburb of the Dallas–Fort Worth metroplex in North Texas. The population is 1,623 as of the 2020 United States census.

== History ==
The area known as Westlake was originally settled in 1847 by Charles and Matilda Medlin with about 20 other families. In the mid-twentieth century, what is now Westlake was known as Circle T Ranch, a 2,000 acre ranch founded by Dallas attorney and oilman J. Glenn Turner. When incorporated in the late 1950s, the name Southlake, Texas already existed, so ranchers and homeowners took the name Westlake.

During the late 1990s, the Board of Alderman attempted to disband the town. The large Solana development was annexed by Southlake, while several large tracts of land were annexed by Fort Worth, Texas. A local district judge ruled the annexations in violation of state law, and the properties returned under Westlake jurisdiction.

In 2000, the radio program This American Life featured a story about the battle to disband the town in the face of development by Ross Perot, Jr.

The city does not provide its own police force. Instead, law enforcement services are contracted from the City of Keller, which provides patrol and traffic enforcement officers to serve Westlake. The city does, however, provide its own Fire-EMS services.

== Geography ==
According to the United States Census Bureau, the town has a total area of 6.7 square miles (17 km^{2}), of which 6.6 square miles (17 km^{2}) is land and 0.1 square miles (0.26 km^{2}) (1.35%) is water.

=== Climate ===
According to the Köppen Climate Classification system, Westlake has a humid subtropical climate, abbreviated "Cfa" on climate maps.

Climate data for Westlake, Texas
| Month | Jan | Feb | Mar | Apr | May | Jun | Jul | Aug | Sep | Oct | Nov | Dec | Year |
|---|---|---|---|---|---|---|---|---|---|---|---|---|---|
| Record high °F (°C) | 86 (30) | 90 (32) | 95 (35) | 100 (38) | 102 (39) | 108 (42) | 109 (43) | 112 (44) | 112 (44) | 99 (37) | 89 (32) | 90 (32) | 112 (44) |
| Mean daily maximum °F (°C) | 65.3 (18.5) | 67.4 (19.7) | 73.0 (22.8) | 78.1 (25.6) | 83.3 (28.5) | 88.2 (31.2) | 91.1 (32.8) | 92.2 (33.4) | 87.3 (30.7) | 81.1 (27.3) | 72.3 (22.4) | 66.0 (18.9) | 92.4 (33.6) |
| Mean daily minimum °F (°C) | 28.0 (−2.2) | 30.6 (−0.8) | 38.5 (3.6) | 50.5 (10.3) | 59.2 (15.1) | 73.8 (23.2) | 77.5 (25.3) | 76.9 (24.9) | 64.7 (18.2) | 50.8 (10.4) | 37.1 (2.8) | 28.8 (−1.8) | 23.5 (−4.7) |
| Average precipitation inches (mm) | 2.12 (54) | 2.09 (53) | 3.09 (78) | 3.60 (91) | 3.96 (101) | 4.12 (105) | 2.28 (58) | 2.33 (59) | 2.71 (69) | 3.33 (85) | 2.05 (52) | 1.93 (49) | 33.61 (854) |
| Average snowfall inches (cm) | 0.3 (0.76) | 0.3 (0.76) | 0.3 (0.76) | 0.0 (0.0) | 0.0 (0.0) | 0.0 (0.0) | 0.0 (0.0) | 0.0 (0.0) | 0.0 (0.0) | 0.0 (0.0) | 0.1 (0.25) | 1.4 (3.6) | 2.4 (6.13) |
| Average precipitation days (≥ 0.01 in) | 6 | 6 | 8 | 7 | 9 | 7 | 6 | 4 | 6 | 7 | 5 | 6 | 77 |
| Average snowy days (≥ 0.1 in) | 0 | 2 | 1 | 0 | 0 | 0 | 0 | 0 | 0 | 0 | 0 | 1 | 4 |
Source: National Weather Service Forecast Office, Ft Worth Alliance Airport, Fort Worth TX

== Demographics ==
Historical population
| Census | Pop. | Note | %± |
|---|---|---|---|
| 1960 | 112 | | — |
| 1970 | 128 | | 14.3% |
| 1980 | 214 | | 67.2% |
| 1990 | 185 | | −13.6% |
| 2000 | 207 | | 11.9% |
| 2010 | 992 | | 379.2% |
| 2020 | 1,623 | | 63.6% |
| 2023 (est.) | 1,920 | ▲ | 18.3% |
U.S. Decennial Census

As of the census of 2000, there were 207 people, 84 households, and 69 families residing in the town. Population estimates as of January 2019 are between 1,300 and 1,600, after several years of growth in several subdivisions. By 2020, its population was 1,623. The population density was 31.4 inhabitants per square mile (12.1/km^{2}). There were 87 housing units at an average density of 13.2 units per square mile (5.1 units/km^{2}). The racial makeup of the town in 2000 was 95.17% White, 2.42% African American, 2.42% from other races. Hispanic or Latino of any race were 0.97% of the population.

There were 84 households, out of which 23.8% had children under the age of 18 living with them, 78.6% were married couples living together, 3.6% had a female householder with no husband present, and 16.7% were non-families. 14.3% of all households were made up of individuals, and 4.8% had someone living alone who was 65 years of age or older. The average household size was 2.46 and the average family size was 2.71.

In the town, the population was spread out, with 21.3% under the age of 18, 2.9% from 18 to 24, 21.3% from 25 to 44, 43.0% from 45 to 64, and 11.6% who were 65 years of age or older. The median age was 47 years. For every 100 females, there were 95.3 males. For every 100 females age 18 and over, there were 94.0 males.

The median income for a household in the town was $128,375, and the median income for a family was $150,000. Males had a median income of $72,250 versus $41,042 for females. The per capita income for the town was $59,206. About 2.9% of families and 2.7% of the population were below the poverty line, including none of those under the age of eighteen and 7.7% of those 65 or over. According to a Residential Survey conducted by the Town of Westlake and published in May 2017, 59% of residents have a combined household income of $500,000 or more.

== Developments ==
When the company PrimeCo first began, it had its headquarters in Westlake. In 1999 the parties splitting PrimeCo agreed that the former headquarters would become the headquarters of the PrimeCo operations taken over by Vodafone AirTouch.

The Town of Westlake has quickly established itself as a Financial Service Industry Cluster within the Dallas–Fort Worth metroplex. The Town is home to multiple financial-based institutions, with more to come.

=== The Plaza at Solana ===
The Plaza at Solana, built in the 1980s and designed by famous architect Ricardo Legorreta, was the first of its kind for the DFW Metroplex. At its inception, the Solana Business Park housed the IBM Corporation with more than 1,000,000 square feet of office space. Today, The Plaza at Solana contains a variety of over 30 businesses and a few restaurants that brings in a daytime population of over 3,000 employees. The properties are also home to the Solana Marriott Hotel. Currently, the Westlake Town Hall and municipal court is located in the Solana Terrace portion of the business park. Solana is also home to the headquarters of technology services provider Sabre Corporation.

In January 2017, a fast-growing agency and franchise announced plans to relocate its corporate headquarters from Irving, TX to the Solana business park in Westlake. The company signed a lease for 62,000 square foot in office space at Solana, which recently completed a $70 million renovation. Goosehead said it planned to move about 150 employees to Westlake from its headquarters in Irving.

In 2019, Chicago based real estate property manager, Glenstar Properties, bought the Solana Terrace and its related buildings. By reinvesting and amenitizing the Solana Terrace space for the multi-tenant complex, Glenstar managed to improve occupancy rates from 45% to 75% in three years. In November 2021, Boston based Albany Road/TXRE properties bought the Solana Plaza office and retail buildings.

=== Corporate Campuses ===
The Town of Westlake is home to several corporate campuses such Fidelity Investments and Deloitte University. Fidelity Investments is a 1,129,853 square foot facility consisting of two buildings nestled behind a dense landscape of trees. Deloitte University is a 727,000 square foot $300 million learning center for Deloitte L.L.P.'s global workforce. The 1,160,000 square foot Charles Schwab Corporation campus houses over 5,000 employees.

=== Entrada ===
Entrada is a mixed-use project in the Town that runs along Highway 114 East meant to emulate a village in Catalonia. The buildings have no setbacks and can be somewhat taller echoing the European-inspired design. Once completed, Entrada will contain large amounts of retail, restaurants, offices, entertainment, and at least one hotel in the project. Entrada also will have 322 residential units, including 170 single family villas, 50 townhomes and 100 condominiums.

The first phase of the $500 million walkable village is at the corner of F.M. 1938 and Texas 114. A one of a kind CVS Pharmacy was the first business to open its doors in October 2016. Shortly thereafter a Primrose School opened in August 2016. Since then Entrada has gained multiple retail tenants. The heart of the development, however, will be the Plaza Mayor which will contain a large one acre or more plaza surrounded by condominiums and at least one hotel along with ground floor retail components.

=== Front 44 ===
Project Blizzard is a 44-acre planned mixed-use development on the 114/170 merge and next to Lake Turner to be developed by Hillwood Properties, a Ross Perot Jr. company, and the Howard Hughes Corporation. The southern portion of the project will be used as Charles Schwab's Corporate Campus. The Schwab project includes a $315 million, 1,160,000 square-foot regional campus in Westlake that ultimately will bring 5,000 jobs to the North Texas within 10 years. Developers also plan a hotel, retail stores, and residences. The Schwab campus will be on the Westlake-Roanoke border, just north of JT Ottinger Road and west of Turner Lake. Governor Greg Abbott says the project will get a $6 million grant from the Texas Enterprise Fund, creating the most new jobs of any enterprise fund grant made during his administration.

== Education ==
Residents of the Town of Westlake may enroll their children into Westlake Academy or the following school districts depending on their location within the Town: Northwest Independent School District, Keller Independent School District, and Carroll Independent School District.

=== Westlake Academy ===
Westlake Academy is an open-enrollment Kindergarten-12th grade charter school in Westlake, operating under the International Baccalaureate (IB) curriculum. Westlake Academy is owned and operated by the Town of Westlake. Any resident of Westlake may enroll their child into Westlake Academy, however citizens who reside outside the jurisdictional boundary of the Town of Westlake can enroll via a lottery system.

=== Carroll ISD ===
The eastern portion of the town is served by Carroll ISD (Exemplary):

- Walnut Grove Elementary School, Exemplary
- Durham Intermediate School, Exemplary
- Carroll Middle School, Exemplary and National Blue Ribbon School
- Carroll High School, Exemplary and National Blue Ribbon School
- Carroll Senior High School, Exemplary

=== Keller ISD ===
The central/southern portion of the town is served by Keller ISD (Recognized):

- Florence Elementary School, Exemplary and National Blue Ribbon School
- Bear Creek Intermediate School, Exemplary
- Keller Middle School, Exemplary
- Keller High School, Recognized

=== Northwest ISD ===
The northern/western portion of the town is served by Northwest ISD, however there are few residences in this part of town:

- Byron Nelson High School
- James M. Steele Accelerated High School
- Medlin Middle School
- Samuel Beck Elementary School
- Lakeview Elementary School
- Cox Elementary School
- Roanoke Elementary School

== Transportation ==
=== Major Airports ===
- Dallas/Fort Worth International Airport
- Fort Worth Alliance Airport

=== Major Roads ===
- Texas State Highway 114
- Texas State Highway 170
- U.S. Route 377
- Farm to Market Road 1938

== Notable people ==
- Glenn Beck, Radio commentator and owner of TheBlaze
- Terry Bradshaw, Former NFL player
- Dez Bryant, Former Dallas Cowboy
- K.J. Choi, Professional golfer
- Ben Crane, Professional golfer
- Chuck Greenberg, brief and former owner of the Texas Rangers
- Cole Hamels, MLB Player
- Josh Hamilton, Former MLB player
- Chris Kirchner, Entrepreneur
- Jim Lentz, CEO Toyota North America
- Sean Payton, football coach and former player
- Lee Raymond, Former CEO of Exxon
- Matthew K. Rose, Former CEO BNSF Railway
- LaDainian Tomlinson, Former NFL player
- Herschel Walker, Former NFL player and Olympian
- Vernon Wells, Former MLB player
- Jason Witten, NFL player
- Patrick Mahomes, NFL player
