= Byron Nelson High School =

Coordinates: 33.0191°N 97.2033°W

- 2775 Bobcat Blvd. Trophy Club TX 76262; United States

Information
- Type: Public High School
- Motto: Learn, Serve, and Lead
- Established: 2009
- School district: Northwest Independent School District
- Principal: Mrs. Kara Lea Deardorff
- Staff: 153.89 (FTE)
- Grades: 9-12
- Enrollment: 2,892 (2023–2024)
- Student to teacher ratio: 18.79
- Colors: Blue, white, and black
- Athletics conference: UIL Class 6A
- Nickname: Bobcats
- Newspaper: The Paw Print (discontinued)
- Yearbook: The Territory
- Affiliation: Affiliated with Project Lead The Way (PLTW)
- Website: Byron Nelson High School website

Byron Nelson High School is a public high school located in Trophy Club, Texas about 20 miles (32 km) north of Fort Worth, Texas, in Denton County and opened in August 2009 for the 09–10 school year. It is the second high school in the Northwest Independent School District. The school cost $86.5 million dollars to build. It is approximately 504,000 square feet (46,800 m^{2}), with a 32,000-square-foot (3,000 m^{2}) courtyard in the middle. The academic wing seats a 700-seat cafeteria with a mall-style food court serving layout. It is built along the property of the Army Corps of Engineers, along the edge of where Denton Creek flows into Lake Grapevine at the lake's southwestern corner. In 2013, the school was rated "Met Standard" by the Texas Education Agency. In 2019, Byron Nelson High School earned an "A" according to TEA's school accountability rating system.

Byron Nelson, competing as a UIL Class 6A school, has operated as a 4-year campus since the academic year 2011–2012. The campus includes sustainable design features such as energy-efficient light fixtures, water-conserving landscaping, and the use of recycled building materials sourced locally. Students have access to a variety of restaurants, including a sandwich restaurant, an Italian restaurant, a burger restaurant, and a restaurant that serves chicken tenders and other fried food. The school housed a coffeeshop called Java City until its closing for the 2020-21 school year. It has since been replaced by the school's own self-funded café called "The Bobcat Den".

== Feeder schools ==
- Medlin Middle School
  - Lakeview Elementary School
  - Beck Elementary School
  - Roanoke Elementary School
- John M. Tidwell Middle School
  - Cox Elementary School
  - Hughes Elementary School
  - Granger Elementary School

== Namesake ==
The school is named in honor of the late Byron Nelson, a heralded professional golfer who lived on a ranch in what would be the feeder zone for the school today near the neighboring town of Roanoke, Texas.

== Athletics ==
The Byron Nelson Bobcats compete in a variety of individual and team sports.

On campus training facilities for athletes include three gymnasiums in the main building, outdoor tennis courts, an indoor partial football field (60 yards long) with artificial surface, two outdoor football fields with artificial surfaces, a baseball stadium with adjacent bullpens, a softball stadium with adjacent bullpens, a concession stand with restrooms, and a field house with locker rooms, meeting rooms, and training rooms (sports rehabilitation), and weight rooms. Athletic teams also train and compete at district-owned facilities such as the aquatic center and Northwest ISD stadium.

=== UIL Athletic Program State Titles ===
UIL Athletic Program State Titles Table
Activity	Year	Division	Final Result	Reference						
Cheerleading (Spirit)	2024	6A Division II	1st Place							
Cheerleading (Spirit)	2022	6A Division II	1st Place							
Cheerleading (Spirit)	2021	6A Division II	1st Place							
Volleyball	2019	6A	1st Place							
Golf (Women)	2016	4A	1st Place							
Soccer (Men)	2014	4A	1st Place	[ref]	-	Volleyball	2024	6A/D2	1st Place	[ref]

=== Basketball (Men) ===
Notable seasons:

- 2010-2011 Qualified for playoffs

2022-23 Qualified for playoffs

=== Cheerleading ===
Notable Seasons:

UIL:

- 2019(6A DII) 3rd Place
- 2020(6A DII) 2nd Place
- 2021(6A DII) 1st Place
- 2022(6A DII) 1st Place
- 2023(6A DII) 2nd Place
- 2024(6A DII) 1st Place

NCA:

- Gameday Coed Varsity Large:
  - 2023 National Champions
  - 2024 National Champions
- Advanced Coed Varsity Performance
  - 2023 National Champions
  - 2024 National Champions

=== Ladies Soccer ===
Notable seasons:

- 2011–2012 State 6A Finalist; 2nd place finish
- 2013–2014 State 6A Quarter-Finalist

=== Men's Soccer ===
Notable seasons:

- 2010-2011 District Runner Up; qualified for playoffs
- 2012-2013 District Champions
- 2013-2014 6A State Champions

=== Varsity Football ===
The Byron Nelson varsity football team hosts home games at Northwest ISD stadium in Justin, Texas.

Varsity Football Seasonal Results Table
Year	District	District Rank	Overall record	District Record	Season Result	Head coach	Reference
2021	4-6A	3rd	9-4	4-2	6A DII Region I Finalist (round 3 playoff loss to Denton Guyer by a score of 43-36 at the Star in Frisco	Travis Pride	
2022		2nd	11-2	6-1	6A DII Region I Finalist (round 3 playoff loss to Denton Guyer by a score of 59-41 at the Star in Frisco	Travis Pride	

=== Golf ===
Notable seasons

Women:

- 2012-2013 4A State Champions

=== Volleyball ===
- 2025 Class 6A/D1 State Champions

== Fine Arts ==
In May 2020, it was announced that the 2019-2020 Byron Nelson Symphony Orchestra was invited to perform at the prestigious Midwest International Band & Orchestra clinic in Chicago, Illinois. The orchestra is composed of the top string, woodwind, brass and percussion students from both the band and orchestra programs. The ensemble is under the direction of Gary Keller, director of orchestras, and Jed Weeks, director of bands. The symphony orchestra was formed in 2012 and has received UIL Sweepstakes Awards for the past eight years.

Marching Band

Marching Band Competition Results
Year	Contest	Organization	Location	Prelim Rank	Finals Rank	Awards / Captions	Head Director	Reference
2023	UIL Area C	UIL	Mesquite Memorial Stadium	8th	10th		Michael Moore	
2023	UIL Region 2	UIL	C.H. Collins Athletic Complex	N/A	Advance		Michael Moore	
2023	US Bands Burleson Regional	US Bands	Burleson ISD Stadium	3rd	7th	FINALS: Best Percussion	Michael Moore	
2023	HEB Marching Contest	HEB ISD	HEB Pennington Field, Bedford, Texas	7th	9th		Michael Moore	Unreleased
2022	UIL Area C	UIL	Mesquite Memorial Stadium	17th	DNQ		Michael Moore	
2022	UIL Region 2	UIL	C.H. Collins Athletic Complex	N/A	Advance		Michael Moore	
2022	US Bands Burleson Regional	US Bands	Burleson ISD Stadium	2nd	2nd		Michael Moore	
2022	HEB Marching Contest	HEB ISD	HEB Pennington Field, Bedford, Texas	12th	10th		Michael Moore	
2021	UIL Region 2	UIL	HEB Pennington Field, Bedfort, Texas	N/A	Advance	N/A	Jed Weeks	
2021	UIL Area C	UIL	Memorial Stadium, Mesquite, Texas	12th	DNQ		Jed Weeks	
2021	HEB Marching Contest	HEB ISD	HEB Pennington Field, Bedford, Texas		10th		Jed Weeks	
2021	Golden Triangle Classic	Denton High School	Denton ISD Stadium, Denton, Texas	2nd	2nd	Outstanding Percussion	Jed Weeks	
2021	US Bands Burleson Showcase	US Bands	Burleson ISD Stadium, Burleson, Texas	1st	1st	PRELIMS: Best in Class; FINALS: Outstanding Music; Outstanding Visual; Outstanding General Effect; Outstanding Percussion	Jed Weeks	
2020	UIL Region	UIL	HEB Pennington Field, Bedfort, Texas	N/A	Sweepstakes	N/A	Jed Weeks	

== Clubs and organizations ==
Byron Nelson is home to many different clubs and organizations. Students participate in band, choir, orchestra, speech and debate, National Honor Society, Student Council, yearbook, Lynx Leaders, and many more extracurricular activities.

The Speech and Debate team sent 5 students to the national finals in June 2011. They also had 10 Regional Qualifiers and 14 State Qualifiers. The school had students place 2nd and 4th in events at UIL 4A State. For the 2011–2012 school year, the team had 24 state bids, 2 UIL State Champions, 1 UIL 2nd Place finisher, and 1 UIL 5th-place finisher, making the speech and debate team the 4A UILState Champions overall. They also had 2 students attend the 2012 National Forensic League National Championship in Indianapolis, Indiana, placing 6th in the nation in Public Forum Debate. In 2014, the team had one student win the state title in two events, a 3rd-place finisher, and two other finalists in the state competition, making the team again the overall 4A UIL State Champion squad.

== Notable events ==
=== Allegedly improper suspension ===
Byron Nelson has made national news in 2010 when school administrators decided to suspend a 16-year-old student. The student exhibited red and watery eyes, a sign, according to school policy that a student has been smoking cannabis. However, the young man was grieving over the murder of his father two days prior. Teachers had been notified of the death. Despite this, the school informed the student's mother that he would need to take a drug test in order to come back to school. She also would need to file a complaint to have the suspension removed from his record.

=== Bomb threat ===
On the afternoon of January 30, 2017, a female student called in a bomb threat stating that she had a bomb strapped to her, was armed with a gun, and had planted a bomb in one of the athletic locker rooms. The school was placed in immediate lockdown, and, as a precaution, Medlin Middle School, Beck Elementary School, and Lakeview Elementary School were also put on lockdown for a short time. BNHS was on lockdown until 6:30 p.m., at which time police determined it was safe to lift the lockdown. Police requested that students leave their backpacks in the building and cars in the parking lot to be searched. Students were only allowed to bring their phone, wallet, and any keys they had. Students were escorted to Medlin Middle School by walking across the practice fields in straight uniform lines and got on a bus or were picked up by parents at the school. Police searched until midnight for any bombs, but found none. On January 31, 2017, the attendance percentage was 67%, down from an average of 94%. The female student who called in the bomb threat was arrested and charged with a felony. Another male student was also arrested.

== Notable alumni ==
- Kellen Diesch, professional football offensive tackle
- Sanaa Barnes, Professional High Jumper
