= Trophy Club, Texas =

- Town
- Motto: "A Great Place To Call Home!"
- Location of Trophy Club in Denton County, Texas
- Interactive map of Trophy Club, Texas
- Coordinates: 33°00′15″N 97°11′34″W
- Country: United States
- State: Texas
- County: Denton, Tarrant
- Established: 1973

Government
  - Type: Council-Manager

Area
  - Total: 4.02 sq mi (10.40 km^{2})
  - Land: 3.98 sq mi (10.32 km^{2})
  - Water: 0.031 sq mi (0.08 km^{2})
- Elevation: 627 ft (191 m)

Population (2020)
  - Total: 13,688
  - Estimate (2021): 13,745
  - Density: 3,126.1/sq mi (1,206.98/km^{2})
- Time zone: UTC−6 (Central (CST))
  - Summer (DST): UTC−5 (CDT)
- ZIP code: 76262
- Area codes: 817, 682
- FIPS code: 48-73710
- GNIS feature ID: 2413401
- Website: Trophy Club, Texas

Trophy Club is a town located primarily in Denton County, Texas, United States (with a very small fraction extending into Tarrant County). It is an affluent suburb of the Dallas–Fort Worth metroplex. When established in the 1970s, it was one of the earliest premier planned communities in Texas, built around the only golf course designed by Ben Hogan. It is located west of the DFW Airport and south of the western edge of Grapevine Lake, spanning the county line separating Denton and Tarrant along State Highway 114. The population was 13,688 in 2020.

== History ==
Trophy Club's history dates back to 1847 when Charles and Matilda Medlin and twenty other families left the state of Missouri to settle in the then-thriving Elizabethtown, Texas. The Medlin's were part of the Peters Colony, a group of settlers in the 19th century that settled in various areas in Texas in hopes to acquire land grants. The families in Elizabethtown remained there until the Elizabeth Creek flooded, causing the families to relocate to higher ground. That area is now present-day Trophy Club.

The Medlins made a lasting impact on the development of the town, and a cemetery was constructed in honor of the Medlins' daughter, Mittie Ann Medlin. The middle school in Trophy Club was also named after the Medlins. The cemetery has information on the settlers that lived in the area.

Long after the time of the Medlins, citizens of DFW began talk about restoring the town. Eventually, the community was developed in 1973 by developers Johnson and Loggins, who created the community as a housing development surrounding the country club. The town was named for the original plan that the country club would house the trophy collections of golf legend Ben Hogan, who designed its golf course. Originally part of Westlake, the town was incorporated in 1985. The first Mayor of Trophy Club was James "Jim" P. Carter, who served as Mayor from 1985 until 1999.

== Geography ==
Trophy Club is located on the southwestern edge of Grapevine Lake. According to the United States Census Bureau, the town has a total area of 4.1 square miles (10.5 km^{2}), of which 75% is land and 25% water.

=== Climate ===
Trophy Club, like the rest of the Dallas–Fort Worth area, has a humid subtropical climate, with hot, humid summers and generally mild to cool winters.

Climate data for Trophy Club, Texas (1981–2010 normals)
Month	Jan	Feb	Mar	Apr	May	Jun	Jul	Aug	Sep	Oct	Nov	Dec	Year
Record high °F (°C)	85 (29)	95 (35)	96 (36)	101 (38)	101 (38)	102 (39)	110 (43)	108 (42)	109 (43)	100 (38)	89 (32)	84 (29)	110 (43)
Mean daily maximum °F (°C)	56.6 (13.7)	60.1 (15.6)	67.6 (19.8)	75.9 (24.4)	83.4 (28.6)	90.8 (32.7)	95.5 (35.3)	96.5 (35.8)	88.6 (31.4)	78.8 (26.0)	67.0 (19.4)	57.2 (14.0)	76.5 (24.7)
Mean daily minimum °F (°C)	32.1 (0.1)	35.3 (1.8)	44.1 (6.7)	51.8 (11.0)	61.5 (16.4)	68.7 (20.4)	72.7 (22.6)	72.5 (22.5)	64.6 (18.1)	53.2 (11.8)	43.5 (6.4)	33.9 (1.1)	52.8 (11.6)
Record low °F (°C)	0 (−18)	0 (−18)	14 (−10)	29 (−2)	41 (5)	50 (10)	57 (14)	55 (13)	38 (3)	22 (−6)	19 (−7)	−1 (−18)	−1 (−18)
Average precipitation inches (mm)	2.24 (57)	2.80 (71)	3.62 (92)	3.16 (80)	4.80 (122)	4.00 (102)	2.38 (60)	1.83 (46)	3.26 (83)	4.02 (102)	2.94 (75)	2.68 (68)	37.73 (958)
Average snowfall inches (cm)	0 (0)	0.2 (0.51)	0 (0)	0 (0)	0 (0)	0 (0)	0 (0)	0 (0)	0 (0)	0 (0)	0 (0)	0.1 (0.25)	0.3 (0.76)
Source: NOAA

== Demographics ==
Historical population
Census	Pop.	Note	%±
1990	3,922		—
2000	6,350		61.9%
2010	8,024		26.4%
2020	13,688		70.6%
2023 (est.)	13,666	▼	−0.2%
U.S. Decennial Census

=== 2020 census ===
As of the 2020 census, Trophy Club had a population of 13,688.

Trophy Club racial composition as of 2020 (NH = Non-Hispanic) (Note: Note: the US Census treats Hispanic/Latino as an ethnic category. This table excludes Latinos from the racial categories and assigns them to a separate category. Hispanics/Latinos can be of any race.)
Race	Number	Percentage
White (NH)	10,601	77.45%
Black or African American (NH)	361	2.64%
Native American or Alaska Native (NH)	59	0.43%
Asian (NH)	810	5.92%
Pacific Islander (NH)	9	0.07%
Some Other Race (NH)	33	0.24%
Mixed/Multi-Racial (NH)	588	4.3%
Hispanic or Latino	1,227	8.96%
Total	13,688	

The median age was 41.2 years. 28.1% of residents were under the age of 18 and 13.3% were 65 years of age or older. For every 100 females, there were 99.8 males, and for every 100 females age 18 and over, there were 98.8 males age 18 and over.

100.0% of residents lived in urban areas, while 0.0% lived in rural areas.

There were 4,566 households, including 3,360 families. Of all households, 45.3% had children under the age of 18, 77.7% were married-couple households, 7.9% were households with a male householder and no spouse or partner present, and 11.6% were households with a female householder and no spouse or partner present. About 10.9% of households were made up of individuals, and 4.8% had someone living alone who was 65 years of age or older.

There were 4,664 housing units, of which 2.1% were vacant. The homeowner vacancy rate was 0.6%, and the rental vacancy rate was 4.3%.

=== Demographic estimates ===
As of 2023, the population of Trophy Club is 13,843.

== Economy ==
=== Top employers ===
According to Trophy Club's 2024 Annual Comprehensive Financial Report, the top employers in the city are:

#	Employer	# of employees
1	Northwest Independent School District	415
2	Baylor Medical Center at Trophy Club	230
3	Trophy Club Country Club	205
4	Tom Thumb	202
5	Town of Trophy Club	108
6	HG Sply Co.	100
7	Hutchins	85
8	Fellowship United Methodist Church	39
9	Premier Academy – Trophy Club	35
10	Church at Trophy Club Lake	30

== Government ==
Trophy Club is governed by a council-manager form of government. The Council consists of seven members: a Mayor and six council members, with the Mayor serving as presiding officer over Council meetings. Council members are elected at-large-by-place for a term of three years. All powers of the Town are vested in the Council, including but not limited to: enacting legislation, adopting budgets and determining policies. The Mayor participates in the discussion and votes on all matters coming before the Council. Additionally, the Mayor, after Council authorization, signs all contracts, conveyances made or entered into by the Town, all bonds, warrants and any other obligations issued under the Town Charter. The Mayor is recognized as the official head of the town by the courts for the purpose of serving civil process, by the Governor for the purpose of enforcing military law and for all ceremonial purposes.

The town's elected officials (as of May 19, 2023) are:

- Mayor – Jeannette Tiffany (2023)
- Council Place 1 – Stacey Bauer (2023)
- Council Place 2 – Jeff Beach (2023)
- Council Place 3 and Mayor Pro Tem – Dennis Sheridan (2023)
- Council Place 4 – Karl Monger (2021)
- Council Place 5 – LuAnne Oldham (2023)
- Council Place 6 – Steve Flynn (2023)

The Town Council has the authority to appoint and remove the Town Manager. The Town Manager acts as the chief administrative officer of the Town and is responsible to the Council for the proper administration of all the affairs of the Town. In addition to the Town Manager, the Council also appoints the Town Attorney and the Town Secretary, who acts as secretary to the Council. The current Interim Town Manager is Patrick Arata, and the current Town Secretary is Tammy Dixon.

=== 2023 mayoral election ===
Despite previously announcing that she would run for re-election, incumbent mayor Alicia Fleury withdrew from the race on the day of the filing deadline. On the same day, Mayor Pro Tem Greg Lamont withdrew from his council race and entered the mayor's race, ensuring that he would run unopposed. Angry at this turn of events, many residents supported former town councilor Jeannette Tiffany, who challenged Lamont as a write-in candidate. Despite not appearing on the ballot, Tiffany won the election with 63% of the vote, becoming the first candidate in recent memory to win an election in Texas as a write-in candidate.

== Education ==
Almost all of Trophy Club is in the Northwest Independent School District. A very small part of it is in the Carroll Independent School District.

Schools for the Northwest ISD portions are Lakeview Elementary and Samuel Beck Elementary (in two separate attendance zones), Medlin Middle School, and Byron Nelson High School.

== Notable people ==
- Tyler Collins, Detroit Tigers – OF – #18
- Terry Fator, winner of America's Got Talent
- Wally Funk, one of the Mercury 13 astronauts
- James Hampton, actor
- Larry Hardy, former coach of the Texas Rangers
- Tommy Maddox, former quarterback for the Pittsburgh Steelers
- Don Stanhouse, former pitcher for major league baseball teams
- Richard William Taylor, swimmer and Speedo model
- Jordan Wall, child actor on Wishbone
- Nini Coco, contestant on RuPaul's Drag Race Season 18

== See also ==
- Byron Nelson High School
