= Double Oak, Texas =

- Town
- Location of Double Oak in Denton County, Texas
- Coordinates: 33°03′42″N 97°07′18″W
- Country: United States
- State: Texas
- County: Denton

Area
  - Total: 2.48 sq mi (6.42 km^{2})
  - Land: 2.45 sq mi (6.34 km^{2})
  - Water: 0.031 sq mi (0.08 km^{2})
- Elevation: 643 ft (196 m)

Population (2020)
  - Total: 3,054
  - Density: 1,250/sq mi (482/km^{2})
- Time zone: UTC-6 (Central (CST))
  - Summer (DST): UTC-5 (CDT)
- ZIP code: 75077
- Area codes: 972, 817
- FIPS code: 48-21028
- GNIS feature ID: 2412442
- Website: doubleoak.texas.gov

Double Oak is a town in Denton County, Texas, United States. The population was 3,054 at the 2020 census.

== Geography ==
According to the United States Census Bureau, the town has a total area of 2.5 square miles (6.4 km^{2}), of which 2.4 square miles (6.3 km^{2}) is land and 0.039 square miles (0.1 km^{2}), or 1.48%, is water.

== Demographics ==
Historical population
Census	Pop.	Note	%±
1980	836		—
1990	1,664		99.0%
2000	2,179		30.9%
2010	2,867		31.6%
2020	3,054		6.5%
2023 (est.)	3,054	Steady	0.0%
U.S. Decennial Census; 2020 Census

=== 2020 census ===
As of the 2020 census, Double Oak had a population of 3,054. The median age was 48.9 years. 21.9% of residents were under the age of 18 and 18.5% of residents were 65 years of age or older. For every 100 females there were 99.6 males, and for every 100 females age 18 and over there were 98.3 males age 18 and over.

96.6% of residents lived in urban areas, while 3.4% lived in rural areas.

There were 1,009 households in Double Oak, of which 36.4% had children under the age of 18 living in them. Of all households, 83.6% were married-couple households, 5.6% were households with a male householder and no spouse or partner present, and 8.3% were households with a female householder and no spouse or partner present. About 6.7% of all households were made up of individuals and 4.0% had someone living alone who was 65 years of age or older.

There were 1,015 housing units, of which 0.6% were vacant. The homeowner vacancy rate was 0.4% and the rental vacancy rate was 0.0%.

Racial composition as of the 2020 census
Race	Number	Percent
White	2,616	85.7%
Black or African American	38	1.2%
American Indian and Alaska Native	17	0.6%
Asian	68	2.2%
Native Hawaiian and Other Pacific Islander	2	0.1%
Some other race	38	1.2%
Two or more races	275	9.0%
Hispanic or Latino (of any race)	209	6.8%

=== 2000 census ===
As of the census of 2000, there were 2,179 people, 682 households, and 632 families residing in the town. The population density was 1,001.4 inhabitants per square mile (386.6/km^{2}). There were 709 housing units at an average density of 325.8 per square mile (125.8/km^{2}). The racial makeup of the town was 94.08% White, 1.15% African American, 0.64% Native American, 0.96% Asian, 1.10% from other races, and 2.07% from two or more races. Hispanic or Latino of any race were 3.90% of the population.

There were 682 households, out of which 47.9% had children under the age of 18 living with them, 89.0% were married couples living together, 2.2% had a female householder with no husband present, and 7.2% were non-families. 5.4% of all households were made up of individuals, and 1.2% had someone living alone who was 65 years of age or older. The average household size was 3.19 and the average family size was 3.31.

In the town, the population was spread out, with 30.1% under the age of 18, 5.7% from 18 to 24, 26.5% from 25 to 44, 32.4% from 45 to 64, and 5.4% who were 65 years of age or older. The median age was 39 years. For every 100 females, there were 98.1 males. For every 100 females age 18 and over, there were 98.8 males.

The median income for a household in the town was $113,400, and the median income for a family was $114,063. Males had a median income of $81,398 versus $47,417 for females. The per capita income for the town was $41,632. About 0.3% of families and 1.4% of the population were below the poverty line, including none of those under the age of eighteen or sixty-five or over.

== Education ==
The majority of Double Oak is served by the Lewisville Independent School District, while a portion to the west is in the Denton Independent School District.

The Denton ISD part is zoned to Adkins Elementary School, Harpool Middle School, and Guyer High School.

== Notable people ==
- Chris Barnes, professional bowler on PBA Tour
- Jochen Graf, professional soccer player for the Tampa Bay Rowdies
