= Argyle, Texas =

- City
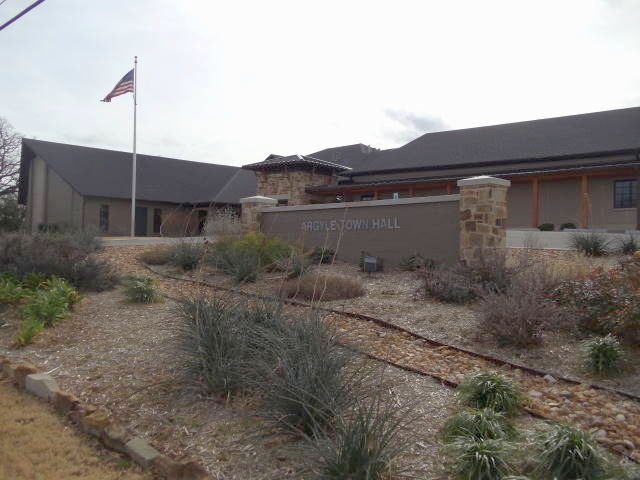
- Argyle Town Hall
- Interactive map of Argyle, Texas
- Coordinates: 33°6′59″N 97°11′8″W
- Country: United States
- State: Texas
- County: Denton

Area
  - Total: 11.61 sq mi (30.06 km^{2})
  - Land: 11.56 sq mi (29.93 km^{2})
  - Water: 0.046 sq mi (0.12 km^{2})
- Elevation: 719 ft (219 m)

Population (2020)
  - Total: 4,403
  - Estimate (2022): 5,503
  - Density: 3,179/sq mi (1,227.6/km^{2})
- Time zone: UTC-6 (Central (CST))
  - Summer (DST): UTC-5 (CDT)
- ZIP code: 76226
- Area code: 940
- FIPS code: 48-03768
- GNIS feature ID: 2409728
- Website: Argyle, TX

Argyle is a city in Denton County, Texas, United States, with a population of 5,503 as of 2022. It is a suburb of Fort Worth. It is known as “The Small Apple” by locals.

== History ==
The first European settlement, consisting of a few families, occurred in the Argyle area in the 1850s. The place was then known as Pilot Knob or Waintown. The settlement gradually acquired a few amenities in the late 1800s - a school in 1875, a Baptist church in 1876, and a post office in 1878. The community was formally founded and renamed Argyle in 1881, after the Texas and Pacific Railroad built a track through the area. Some believe a railroad surveyor named the town after a garden in France, but others believe the town to be named after the region of Argyll in Scotland. Also around this time, Sam Bass, an infamous outlaw who stole $60,000 in gold coins from the Union Pacific Railroad, was rumored to have stashed the gold in a cave. Sam Bass died when he was 27, and it was rumored he never lived to retrieve the gold.

Growth was very slow during the 19th century, and by 1890, Argyle only had a population of 148. The town did boast several agriculture-related industries, such as grist mills, general stores, and a cotton gin. In 1885, Argyle built a two-story brick school, and population grew until it reached 238 in 1930. A bank was also established in 1906, a little red brick building with a drugstore in the front. The bank was not around long before it was robbed in 1912. The robbers made away with $1700 and were never caught. Electricity and telephone service became available in the mid-1930s.

The Great Depression took its toll on the Argyle area, and the population declined to only 90 in 1950. Argyle incorporated as a separate city on September 19, 1960, with M.H. Wilson as the first mayor. Gradually, the town grew in population as more people from the Dallas–Fort Worth area discovered its rural charm. By the 1970s, a number of retail establishments were located in Argyle, and the population reached 1,575 in 1990, and doubled from that figure to 3,282 at the 2010 census. The high rate of growth is expected to continue as part of the general development of northern areas in the Dallas–Fort Worth metroplex.

== Geography ==
According to the United States Census Bureau, the town has a total area of 11.4 square miles (29.6 km^{2}), of which 0.04 sq mi (0.1 km^{2}), or 0.41%, is covered by water.

== Demographics ==
Historical population
| Census | Pop. | Note | %± |
|---|---|---|---|
| 1970 | 443 | | — |
| 1980 | 1,111 | | 150.8% |
| 1990 | 1,575 | | 41.8% |
| 2000 | 2,365 | | 50.2% |
| 2010 | 3,282 | | 38.8% |
| 2020 | 4,403 | | 34.2% |
| 2023 (est.) | 5,859 | | 33.1% |
U.S. Decennial Census

=== 2020 census ===
As of the 2020 census, Argyle had a population of 4,403 people, 1,422 households, and 1,301 families. The median age was 41.3 years; 27.7% of the residents were under 18 and 12.6% were 65 or older. For every 100 females, there were 101.0 males, and for every 100 females 18 and over, there were 96.8 males 18 and over.

Almost none of the residents lived in urban areas, while 99.7% lived in rural areas.

Of the 1,422 households in Argyle, 44.5% had children under 18 living in them, 77.4% were married-couple households, 7.9% were households with a male householder and no spouse or partner present, and 12.3% were households with a female householder and no spouse or partner present. About 9.4% of all households were made up of individuals, and 4.9% had someone living alone who was 65 or older.

The city had 1,506 housing units, of which 5.6% were vacant. Among occupied housing units, 92.1% were owner-occupied and 7.9% were renter-occupied. The homeowner vacancy rate was 3.0% and the rental vacancy rate was 3.4%.

Racial composition as of the 2020 census
| Race | Percentage |
|---|---|
| White | 86.7% |
| Black or African American | 0.9% |
| American Indian and Alaska Native | 0.7% |
| Asian | 0.8% |
| Native Hawaiian and other Pacific Islander | 0% |
| Some other race | 1.8% |
| Two or more races | 9.1% |
| Hispanic or Latino (of any race) | 8.0% |

== Education and local notes ==
The Argyle Independent School District serves the town of Argyle and neighboring areas. with seven schools.

Argyle has established a police department and a municipal court; it has a low crime rate. The town sponsored an annual bluegrass music festival, but this ended in 2012.

== Notable people ==
- JoJo Fletcher, an American television personality
- Walt Garrison, former professional football player for the Dallas Cowboys
