= Haslet, Texas =

City of Haslet
- City
- Location of Haslet in Tarrant County, Texas
- Coordinates: 32°57′35″N 97°20′24″W
- Country: United States
- State: Texas
- Counties: Tarrant, Denton

Government
  - Type: Council–manager
  - City council: Mayor

Area
  - Total: 8.94 sq mi (23.16 km^{2})
  - Land: 8.93 sq mi (23.12 km^{2})
  - Water: 0.019 sq mi (0.05 km^{2})
- Elevation: 712 ft (217 m)

Population (2020)
  - Total: 1,952
  - Estimate (2025): 5,267
  - Density: 218.7/sq mi (84.43/km^{2})
- Time zone: UTC-6 (CST)
  - Summer (DST): UTC-5 (CDT)
- ZIP Code: 76052
- Area codes: 682, 817
- FIPS code: 48-32720
- GNIS feature ID: 2410713
- Website: www.haslet.org

Haslet is a city in mostly Tarrant County and partly in Denton County within the Dallas–Fort Worth metroplex in the U.S. state of Texas, and is located 15 miles north of downtown Fort Worth and 20 miles south of Denton. Haslet borders Interstate 35W, U.S. Highway 287, and Alliance Airport. The population was 1,952 at the 2020 census.

== History ==
According to the Handbook of Texas, the area was settled around 1880, but likely no distinct community formed until 1883, when the tracks of the Gulf, Colorado and Santa Fe Railway were extended through the area. Haslett, Michigan, was the hometown of the railroad's contractor. A post office opened in 1887; by 1896, the one-teacher school had 21 students. Haslet's population was 67 in 1903 and 50 in 1915. During the 1920s, Haslet had three grocery stores, a hardware store, a dry goods store, and a cotton gin.

== Geography ==
According to the United States Census Bureau, the town has a total area of 8.2 square miles (21.2 km^{2}), of which 0.02 square miles (0.05 km^{2}), or 0.22%, is water. Haslet is 702 ft. above sea level.

=== Climate ===
The climate in this area is characterized by hot, humid summers and generally mild to cool winters. According to the Köppen climate classification, Haslet has a humid subtropical climate, Cfa on climate maps.

Haslet, Texas

Climate chart (precipitation, max. and min. temperature)
J	F	M	A	M	J	J	A	S	O	N	D
2.1 65 28	2.1 67 30	3.1 73 38	3.6 78 51	4 83 59	4.1 88 74	2.3 91 78	2.3 92 77	2.7 87 65	3.3 81 51	2.1 72 37	1.9 66 29
- █ Average max. and min. temperatures in °F
- █ Precipitation totals in inches
- Source: NWS, Ft Worth Alliance Airport TX
Metric conversion
J	F	M	A	M	J	J	A	S	O	N	D
54 18 −2	53 19 −1	78 23 3	91 26 11	101 28 15	105 31 23	58 33 26	59 33 25	69 31 18	85 27 11	52 22 3	49 19 −2
- █ Average max. and min. temperatures in °C
- █ Precipitation totals in mm

Climate data for Haslet, Texas
Month	Jan	Feb	Mar	Apr	May	Jun	Jul	Aug	Sep	Oct	Nov	Dec	Year
Record high °F (°C)	86 (30)	90 (32)	95 (35)	100 (38)	102 (39)	108 (42)	109 (43)	112 (44)	112 (44)	99 (37)	89 (32)	90 (32)	112 (44)
Mean daily maximum °F (°C)	65.3 (18.5)	67.4 (19.7)	73.0 (22.8)	78.1 (25.6)	83.3 (28.5)	88.2 (31.2)	91.1 (32.8)	92.2 (33.4)	87.3 (30.7)	81.1 (27.3)	72.3 (22.4)	66.0 (18.9)	92.4 (33.6)
Mean daily minimum °F (°C)	28.0 (−2.2)	30.6 (−0.8)	38.5 (3.6)	50.5 (10.3)	59.2 (15.1)	73.8 (23.2)	77.5 (25.3)	76.9 (24.9)	64.7 (18.2)	50.8 (10.4)	37.1 (2.8)	28.8 (−1.8)	23.5 (−4.7)
Average precipitation inches (mm)	2.12 (54)	2.09 (53)	3.09 (78)	3.60 (91)	3.96 (101)	4.12 (105)	2.28 (58)	2.33 (59)	2.71 (69)	3.33 (85)	2.05 (52)	1.93 (49)	33.61 (854)
Average snowfall inches (cm)	0.3 (0.76)	0.3 (0.76)	0.3 (0.76)	0.0 (0.0)	0.0 (0.0)	0.0 (0.0)	0.0 (0.0)	0.0 (0.0)	0.0 (0.0)	0.0 (0.0)	0.1 (0.25)	1.4 (3.6)	2.4 (6.13)
Average precipitation days (≥ 0.01 in)	6	6	8	7	9	7	6	4	6	7	5	6	77
Average snowy days (≥ 0.1 in)	0	2	1	0	0	0	0	0	0	0	0	1	4
Source: National Weather Service Forecast Office, Ft Worth Alliance Airport, Fort Worth TX

== Demographics ==
Historical population
Census	Pop.	Note	%±
1970	276		—
1980	262		−5.1%
1990	795		203.4%
2000	1,134		42.6%
2010	1,517		33.8%
2020	1,952		28.7%
2025 (est.)	5,267		169.8%
U.S. Decennial Census

=== 2020 census ===
As of the 2020 census, Haslet had a population of 1,952. The median age was 45.1 years. 21.4% of residents were under the age of 18 and 17.1% of residents were 65 years of age or older. For every 100 females there were 99.8 males, and for every 100 females age 18 and over there were 99.6 males age 18 and over.

97.5% of residents lived in urban areas, while 2.5% lived in rural areas.

There were 666 households in Haslet, of which 39.9% had children under the age of 18 living in them. Of all households, 77.0% were married-couple households, 9.8% were households with a male householder and no spouse or partner present, and 9.0% were households with a female householder and no spouse or partner present. About 9.6% of all households were made up of individuals and 3.7% had someone living alone who was 65 years of age or older.

There were 723 housing units, of which 7.9% were vacant. The homeowner vacancy rate was 5.7% and the rental vacancy rate was 0.0%.

Racial composition as of the 2020 census
Race	Number	Percent
White	1,581	81.0%
Black or African American	53	2.7%
American Indian and Alaska Native	18	0.9%
Asian	43	2.2%
Native Hawaiian and Other Pacific Islander	0	0.0%
Some other race	69	3.5%
Two or more races	188	9.6%
Hispanic or Latino (of any race)	235	12.0%

== Economy ==
Considered a major intermodal hub, Haslet has a transportation and distribution network via major highways, and nearby Alliance Airport. Dallas Fort Worth International Airport is 30 minutes away.

Haslet's primary trade area was 605,917 in 2015 and is expected to grow to 675,018 by 2019. With a build-out of only 20% of available sites, Haslet is positioning itself to attract new corporations and businesses. Haslet offers a property tax rate of 33 cents per $100.
