= Green Valley, Texas =

Ghost town in Texas, United States

Coordinates: 33.31344990°N 97.06417670°W

Green Valley, previously called Toll Town, is a ghost town in northeast Denton County in the state of Texas in the United States of America. The ghost town is about 8 miles away from the city of Denton and rests near the Elm Fork in the Trinity River. The town received its name for the valley it rested in.

The site is one of the several ghost towns in Denton County, and one of many in Texas. Some notable ones in Denton County include Elizabethtown, Drop, Stony, and Alton.

== History ==
Settlers began to move toward a valley located in between the Trinity River and two nearby creeks in the year 1870, five years after the end of the American Civil War. They were drawn to the valley because of its abundance of water, fertile soil, and a large amount of trees that would protect settlers from Native Americans. A village eventually formed, originally called Toll Town. The reason for this naming is believed to be because of two roads or trails that intersected at the site of the village. Sometime in the early 1870s, a man named Henry Clay Wilmoth arrived at Toll Town and began teaching at a subscription school.

Locals began to want a post office to make their town official, so Henry applied for one to be set up in Toll Town, and the request was accepted. The post office was later granted in 1874. Everyone soon wanted a different name for the town. Henry made the suggestion that the town be named "Green Valley" due to the surrounding landscape, and the name was officially changed in 1878.

After the post office was constructed, the town grew with the addition of three stores and a blacksmith shop. Green Valley had a population of 50 people around this time, and plans were made to construct more schools and form the Green Valley School District. It isn't known at what time these were made, but a church and cemetery were constructed as well.

In 1880, a man who has been documented as Mr. C.A. Hankins, was mining limestone when bright yellow chunks blew out of the rocks. He believed what he found to be gold, so he traveled to Denton and the community was ecstatic. But he soon learned that what he found was known as "fools gold", which was mostly sulfur.

=== Green Valley School District ===
In 1883 a second subscription school was opened only about a hundred yards from the first one. According to residents of the time, the school was "poorly furnished" and parents had to either make or bring their own furniture and equipment. Later, in the spring of 1884, the two schools were organized to form District Number 20, also known as Green Valley School District 20. Once the district was organized, another schoolhouse was built in the center of the town.

Apparently the location of the school had citizens upset. Families that lived further north wanted the school to be closer to them, as with the families that lived in the southern portion of Green Valley. This led to a division in the types of students that attended; the "Northern crowd" and the "Southern crowd." Similarly to the previous ones, this school was also poorly constructed. It had no solid foundation, and animals, particularly rabbits and dogs, would get inside the school and make a commotion. In March 1884 students arrived to school to find that the schoolhouse was gone. The previous night, unknown conditions had caused the school to burn down.

After the old school was gone the leader of the South Crowd knew he wouldn't be able to relocate a new schoolhouse closer to the southern portion of the town, so it was built where the old one was. This caused further conflicts between the two crowds, and a vote was held to move the new school a half-mile north of the old one. This school was much more modern and was perfectly suitable for students to attend comfortably. However, around 10–12 years later, the building was demolished and construction on a new one began.

Long after the decline of Green Valley, yet another school opened in 1919, when the district was annexed into the Denton Independent School District. Operations at the new school lasted much longer than all the others, and students attended first through tenth grade up until 1935 when it was decided that children would attend until their ninth year, then go to Denton schools for their tenth and eleventh. The school remained open until 1949.

== Decline ==
Despite the activity at the Green Valley School District before the new school was even constructed, Green Valley began to decline shortly after the year 1881. Like many other ghost towns in North Texas at the time, this was due to the Texas and Pacific Railway. The railway system was supposed to bring people to Green Valley in a modern and much quicker way. However, the railroads bypassed the town by about 5 miles. Shortly after, the town of Aubrey was founded and almost everyone in Green Valley moved there to be closer to the railroad.

== Current State ==
Currently Green Valley rests near Aubrey, Denton, Krugerville, and Cooper Creek. The church, Green Valley School, and the cemetery all still remain in the area and in active use. The school has been repurposed as a community center for anyone to use. An RV park has also been constructed in the northern portion of the site. Much of the area has also been secured by the United States Army Corps of Engineers for Ray Roberts Lake. People still live in Green Valley, although it is unknown what the population count is as of 2025. These factors have led to debate over whether to consider Green Valley as a ghost town or an unincorporated community.

== Geography ==
Green Valley is near the towns of Aubrey, Denton, and Krugerville in the north-eastern part of Denton County. The ghost town is located on Farm-to-Market Road 2153 and Shepard Road. The ZIP Code for the area is 76227.
