= Alton, Texas (ghost town) =

Ghost town in Denton County, Texas

Alton is a ghost town in Denton County, Texas. Its site is mostly surrounded by the towns of Corinth, Argyle, Copper Canyon and Lantana, running along Hickory Creek at Old Alton Road and East Hickory Hill Road. Along with Elizabethtown, Drop, and Stony, it is one of the four ghost towns of Denton County.

== History ==
Alton's strange, hopscotch history began in 1846 when government officials of the newly-formed Denton County were looking for a county seat. The county's first pioneers picked a remote location along Pecan Creek and named it Pinckneyville after Texas' first governor, James Pinckney Henderson. The county seat occupied that spot for only two years before water shortages forced a move to another site on a high ridge between Pecan Creek and Hickory Creek, about a mile from Pinckneyville and a mile from present-day Corinth. They named the new county seat Alton.

W.C. Baines had been the only resident, having established a farmstead long before the town relocated, and county business was conducted under a tree in Mr. Baines' backyard. But even this location proved unfavorable, most likely due to the lack of drinkable water. The Texas State Legislature resolved the problem in November 1850 by designating a new site on Hickory Creek five miles south of where Denton stands today.

The new town site retained the name of Alton when it submitted an application for a post office. While the application was pending, a hotel and two stores were opened, the town continued to attract residents, and by 1856 it contained several homes, a blacksmith, third store, a school, a saloon, another hotel, two more doctors, and a lawyer. The Hickory Creek Baptist Church, that still holds weekly services, was also established.

However, by 1856 its citizens soured on it because the bad water was making them sick. They signed a petition for another county seat, this time asking for better water sources and a location more central to the county. Later that year, Denton County held an election and accepted an offer from three businessmen. They provided 100 acres of land for a new, permanent county seat and named it for the county. This became modern-day Denton.

== Decline ==
Denton became a boomtown and the population rapidly rose to around a thousand. Living in Alton became inconvenient and many residents subsequently moved to Denton. Businesses closed and in 1859 the post office did too, sealing Alton's fate as a ghost town. Its cemetery contains graves dating back to 1852, some of which contain Denton County's earliest settlers. Even after Alton's demise, many returned to bury their loved ones its the cemetery and the cemetery is still in frequent use today.

== The Old Alton Bridge ==
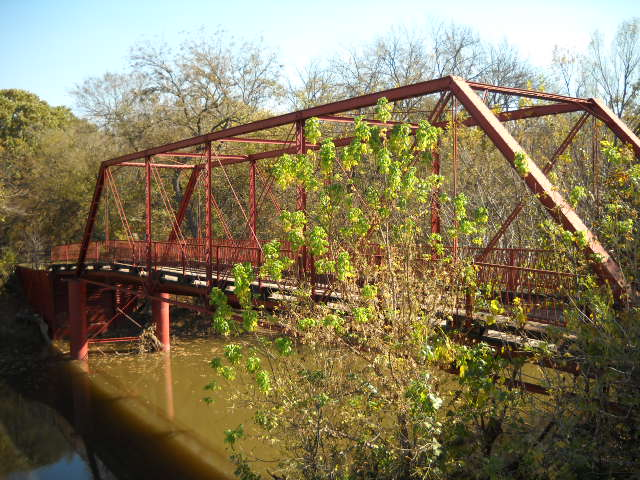
The bridge near Alton, Texas.

Despite the abandonment of Alton the King Bridge Company of Cleveland, Ohio built an iron through-truss bridge just south of the town site in 1884, decades after its decline. It was named the Old Alton Bridge after the town and the cemetery. The bridge was in regular use carrying vehicular traffic from Old Alton Road and Copper Canyon Road until 2001, thirteen years after it was listed on the National Register of Historic Places in 1988.
