= Krum High School =

Coordinates: 33.2639°N 97.2268°W

Location
- 700-A Bobcat Blvd. Krum, Texas 76249-9649; United States

Information
- School type: Public high school high school
- School district: Krum Independent School District
- Principal: Samuel Bonsu
- Staff: 52.62 (FTE)
- Grades: 9–12
- Enrollment: 754 (2023–2024)
- Student to teacher ratio: 14.33
- Colors: Blue & White
- Athletics conference: UIL Class AAAA
- Mascot: Bobcat/Lady Bobcat
- Yearbook: The Bobcat
- Website: Krum High School

Krum High School is a public high school located in the city of Krum, Texas, USA and classified as a 4A school by the UIL. It is a part of the Krum Independent School District located in west central Denton County. In 2015, the school was rated "Met Standard" by the Texas Education Agency.

In addition to Krum, the school's boundary includes a portion of Denton.

== Academics ==
The high school excels in UIL academic competitions, with six individuals advancing to the state meet in 2007.

== Athletics ==
The Krum Bobcats compete in cross country, volleyball, football, basketball, powerlifting, golf, tennis, track, softball, and baseball.

=== Addition of football ===
Unusual for high schools in high-school football crazy Texas, Krum did not participate in football until 2010. In 2006, Krum ISD voters defeated by a 53-vote margin a $6 million bond issue that would have added a football stadium to the school and football as an extracurricular activity for the first time since 1922. In November 2007, voters passed a $7.5 million bond package to add facilities for football and girls' volleyball. The district began to offer these sports during the 2008–09 school year.

=== State titles ===
- Boys' basketball
  - 1971(B), 1978(B), 1994(2A), 1996(2A), 1998(2A)
- Boys' cross country
  - 2003(2A)
- Girls' cross country
  - 2001(2A), 2002(2A)
- Girls' softball
  - 2017(4A)

The boys' basketball team shares the state record for championships in its classification.
