= National Register of Historic Places listings in Denton County, Texas =

Location of Denton County in Texas

This is a list of the National Register of Historic Places listings in Denton County, Texas.

This is intended to be a complete list of the properties and districts on the National Register of Historic Places in Denton County, Texas. There are four districts and 13 individual properties listed on the National Register in the county. Another property was once listed but has been removed. Two individually listed properties are designated Recorded Texas Historic Landmarks including one that is also a State Antiquities Landmark and located within a district. Another district contains an additional Recorded Texas Historic Landmark.

This National Park Service list is complete through NPS recent listings posted September 25, 2026.

== Current listings ==
The publicly disclosed locations of National Register properties and districts may be seen in a mapping service provided.

	Name on the Register	Image	Date listed	Location	City or town	Description
1	Central Roanoke Historic District	Central Roanoke Historic District	May 29, 2008 (#08000476)	100 & 200 blocks of N. Oak St. 32°59′59″N 97°13′43″W	Roanoke	Includes Recorded Texas Historic Landmark
2	Cranston Site	Cranston Site	August 21, 1982 (#82004499)	Address restricted	Denton	
3	Denton County Courthouse	Denton County Courthouse	December 20, 1977 (#77001438)	Public Sq. 33°12′54″N 97°07′58″W	Denton	State Antiquities Landmark, Recorded Texas Historic Landmark; part of Denton County Courthouse Square Historic District
4	Denton County Courthouse Square Historic District	Denton County Courthouse Square Historic District	December 28, 2000 (#00001582)	Area bounded by Pecan, Austin, Walnut, and Cedar Sts. 33°13′26″N 97°08′00″W	Denton	Includes State Antiquities Landmark, Recorded Texas Historic Landmark
5	Fairhaven Retirement Home	Fairhaven Retirement Home	September 26, 2019 (#100004431)	2400 N. Bell Ave. 33°14′12″N 97°07′36″W	Denton	
6	Johnson Farm		November 17, 1994 (#94000449)	Johnson Branch Park; 33°25′03″N 97°02′53″W	Lake Ray Roberts	
7	Jones Farm		December 7, 1994 (#94001357)	Johnson Branch Park, Lake Ray Roberts; 33°24′53″N 97°02′38″W	Sanger	
8	J. C. Lambert Site	J. C. Lambert Site	August 21, 1982 (#82004500)	Address restricted	Denton	
9	Old Alton Bridge	Old Alton Bridge	July 8, 1988 (#88000979)	Copper Canyon Rd. 33°07′45″N 97°06′13″W	Copper Canyon	Recorded Texas Historic Landmark
10	Old Continental State Bank	Old Continental State Bank	July 22, 1986 (#86001939)	109 N Oak St. 32°59′57″N 97°13′45″W	Roanoke	Part of Central Roanoke Historic District
11	Pilot Point Commercial Historic District	Pilot Point Commercial Historic District	August 30, 2007 (#07000893)	Portions of eight blocks in downtown Pilot Point centered around the public square 33°23′47″N 96°57′40″W	Pilot Point	
12	Pioneer Woman Monument	Pioneer Woman Monument	April 19, 2018 (#100002347)	Pioneer Cir., Texas Woman's University; 33°13′24″N 97°07′46″W	Denton	
13	Rector Road Bridge	Rector Road Bridge	January 14, 2004 (#03001418)	7501 Teasley Lane; 33°08′12″N 97°06′08″W	Denton	Formerly approximately 2.5 mi (4.0 km). SE of Sanger on Rector Road. Relocated to Guyer High School Grounds in March 2005
14	Roark-Griffith Site	Roark-Griffith Site	August 21, 1982 (#82004501)	Address restricted	Denton	
15	A. H. Serren Site		August 21, 1982 (#82004502)	Address restricted	Denton	
16	West Denton Residential Historic District	West Denton Residential Historic District	February 11, 2021 (#100005459)	Roughly bounded by West Hickory St., Panhandle St., Carroll Blvd., and Ponder Ave. 33°13′05″N 97°08′31″W	Denton	
17	Wilson-Donaldson Site		August 21, 1982 (#82004503)	Address restricted	Denton	

== Former listing ==
	Name on the Register	Image	Date listed	Date removed	Location	City or town	Description
1	Gregory Road Bridge at Duck Creek		January 14, 2004 (#03001419)	June 27, 2014	Denton County Administrative Complex, intersection of Loop 288 and Morse Road; 33°12′12″N 97°05′22″W	Sanger	Formerly Approx. 0.5 mi (0.80 km). W of Lois Rd., near the N Denton County line. Replaced in 2007. Delisted due to improper relocation.

== See also ==
- National Register of Historic Places listings in Texas
- Recorded Texas Historic Landmarks in Denton County
