= Stony, Texas =

Coordinates: 33°13′27″N 97°21′09″W

- Ghost town
- Location within the state of Texas
- State: Texas
- County: Denton
- Named for: The rocky soil in the area.
- Time zone: UTC-6 (Central (CST))
  - Summer (DST): CDT
- No map available.

Stony is a ghost town in Denton County in the U.S. State of Texas. The former town site is between Old Stoney Road and Farm to Market Road 2622 (FM 2622) in the western portion of Denton County.

Stony is one of the three ghost towns in Denton County, which also include Elizabethtown and Drop, and one of many ghost towns in Texas.

== History ==
Stony was first settled in the late 1850s and was named for the stony, rocky area it resided in. The population started out at only around a couple people, but it never exceeded a population of over 50. Stony opened a post office in 1879, but it only lasted until 1918. The town had a rather small boom in the 1880s. In 1884, the town opened a mill, a gin, four churches, two schools, and had a population of around 130.

== Decline ==
Stony started losing most of its population by 1890, when the population dropped to 50. However, in 1914, the population re-surged a bit and grew to 100 residents. The town now had a doctor, a blacksmith, and two more stores. In time, though, many of the original residents moved to Justin, about eight miles southwest of Stony.

From 1933 to 2000, the population was estimated to only be around 25, and around the same time, Stony was beginning to be removed off of most maps.

In 2004, a restored log cabin dating back to 1839 was open to the public as a museum from the abandoned town, and other buildings such as an 1884 schoolhouse.

== Current state ==
Stony currently resides as a ghost town, but it often attracts many history buffs and tourists. One citizen of Denton County, Bill Marquis, has made efforts in trying to restore Stony and enlighten people on its history and existence. He even opened his own store.

== Geography ==
Stony, Texas, resides in far-west Denton County near the Wise County line on FM 2622 and Old Stoney Road. The town currently is a ghost town, but as stated previously, there have been efforts in restoring it to its former glory. The zip code for the area is 76259. Nearby towns and cities include Justin, Ponder, Decatur, Krum, and Denton.
