= Elizabethtown, Texas =

- Ghost town
- Location within the state of Texas
- Coordinates: 33°01′18″N 97°16′36″W
- Country: United States
- State: Texas
- County: Denton
- Time zone: UTC-6 (Central (CST))
  - Summer (DST): UTC-5 (CDT)
- ZIP codes: 76262
- FIPS code: 48121
- GNIS feature ID: 1378252

Elizabethtown, once known as Bugtown, is a ghost town located about fifteen miles southwest of Denton in Denton County, Texas, United States. The town derived its original name from the adjacent Elizabeth Creek. The creek starts in northeast Roanoke and ends near Rhome, Haslet, and Avondale.

The town is one of at least five ghost towns in Denton County, which includes Drop, Stony, Alton, and Green Valley. It is one of many ghost towns in Texas.

== History ==
The town site was located in the southeast corner of George W. Shamblin Survey #1191. Its first residents, members of the Peters Colony arrived c. 1850. Elizabethtown served as a supply station in 1852, mostly for cowboys driving their herds to Kansas. The town founders, the Harmonsons, constructed a church, homes, a business, and a school. At its height, the school had 25 students. In 1859 the town had six saloons, a hotel and a post office, a staple of all true towns.

According to residents of nearby Justin, Elizabethtown was once known as Bugtown after so many bugs swarmed in on a camp meeting one night that the preaching had to be stopped.

During the Civil War, the frontier in and west of Denton County remained unprotected against Indian resistance; many families moved east during this time period. Later, though, many did return. As the town grew it gained four general stores, another hotel and a livery stable, along with Baptist and Methodist churches, and a Masonic lodge that operated from 1873 to 1876.

=== John M. Tidwell ===
The schoolhouse included in the town formed its own school district, Elizabethtown School District #58, which was created in 1884. In 1911, a man by the name of John Morgan Tidwell was born, and started attending school at the schoolhouse at approximately the age of five. When the school became obsolete due to the decline of Elizabethtown, he moved to Roanoke with his family. But the school district Tidwell attended did not last for long.

By 1946, Elizabethtown School District consolidated with Roanoke and surrounding districts. This formed the creation of Northwest Independent School District in 1949.

When John M. Tidwell grew older, he applied to become a board member at the district, and became a prominent member, improving the growth of the district. However, Tidwell died in 1999.

In honor of his service to the cities of Roanoke, Elizabethtown, and to the board members at NISD, a school was named after him and was opened in 2010 in Roanoke, named John M. Tidwell Middle School.

== Decline and possible resurgence ==
Elizabethtown last appeared on the Denton County tax roll in 1880. The Texas and Pacific Railway, which was built in 1881 from Fort Worth through Denton County, bypassed Elizabethtown by just two miles. Many residents subsequently moved two miles east to the newly established town of Roanoke, along with their businesses, churches and the Masonic lodge. Although the town vanished sometime in the 1950s, Elizabethtown was estimated to have a population of about 5 people, as there were some surrounding houses, including a farm that can be concluded was demolished sometime after 2014 by using Google Maps street view data.

As of 1950, the only remnant of Elizabethtown is the Elizabeth Cemetery, which is still in use today, and an interconnected road named Elizabethtown Cemetery Road. Everything else in the town is gone, and the area remains a grassy field that is currently open for lease off of Highway 114.

However, in 1997, a Renaissance Fair named the Hawkwood Renaissance Faire, operated in the heart of Elizabethtown until 2001. It is currently unknown why the fair ceased operations, but some popular myths include fear due to 9/11 and a rave that destroyed the location. The real reason was revealed as the location simply not getting as much business as it used to. Small remnants of the fair, such as wood and building parts can be seen from satellite imagery on Google Maps to this day.

Additionally, in 2021, the area was repurposed for several Amazon warehouses and other businesses, and they are currently sitting right off of Elizabethtown Cemetery Road, which was recently paved. This repurposing of the land surrounding what was once the southern portion of Elizabethtown could signify a possible resurgence for the area.

== Geography ==
The site of the former town is by the Elizabeth Creek, south of the intersection of Interstate 35 and State Highway 114. The heart of the town was just north of the creek where a modern apartment complex now resides. The cemetery is in the southeastern corner of the ghost town, off of Elizabethtown Cemetery Road. Although the town is no longer there, the name "Elizabethtown" is shown on Google Maps to be near the Texas Motor Speedway. The zip code for the area is 76262. Surrounding cities include Roanoke, Northlake, Denton, Fort Worth, and Justin.
