= Ponder High School =

Location
- 300 West Bailey Street; Ponder, Texas 76259; United States; 33.185252°N 97.291560°W

Information
- School type: Public high school
- School district: Ponder Independent School District
- Principal: Christopher Jones
- Teaching staff: 44.93 (FTE)
- Grades: 9-12
- Enrollment: 557 (2024-2025)
- Student to teacher ratio: 12.40
- Colors: Red, White & Grey
- Athletics conference: UIL Class 3A
- Mascot: Lion/Lady Lion
- Yearbook: The Lion
- Website: Ponder High School

Ponder High School is a public high school located in Ponder, Texas (USA) and classified as a 3A school by the UIL. It is part of the Ponder Independent School District located in southwestern Denton County. In 2015, the school was rated "Met Standard" by the Texas Education Agency.

Shawn Simmons is the principal of the school.

The school district boundary, and therefore the high school attendance zone, includes Ponder, DISH, and portions of Denton and Northlake.

== Academics ==
Ponder High School offer AP Calculus as a class. It also offers dual credit enrollment in US History, Government/Economics, and English as well as honor classes in Math, Science, Social Studies, and English.

== Athletics ==
The Ponder Lions compete in these sports -

- Baseball
- Basketball
- Cross Country
- Football
- Golf
- Powerlifting
- Softball
- Tennis
- Track and Field
- Volleyball

=== State Titles ===
- Boys Basketball -
  - 2001(2A), 2008(2A), 2009(2A), 2010(2A), 2014(2A)

==== State Finalist ====
- Baseball -
  - 1993(2A), 2004(2A)
- Boys Basketball -
  - 2006(2A)
