= Ranchman's Ponder Steakhouse =

Coffee shop and restaurant in Los Angeles, California

Ranchman's By Marty B
- Interactive map of Ranchman's By Marty B

Restaurant information
- Established: November 25, 1948; 77 years ago
- Owner: Marty Bryan
- Previous owner: Grace "Pete" Jackson (1948–1992) (founder): Dave Ross (1992–2023)
- Food type: Diner
- Location: 110 W. Bailey St., Ponder, Denton, TX, 76259, US 33.1833929,-97.2905563
- Coordinates: 33°11′0.2148″N 97°17′26.001″W
- Reservations: none
- Other locations: none
- Website: https://www.ranchman.com/

Ranchman's by Marty B, previously named Ranchman's Cafe, and then Ranchman's Ponder Steakhouse is a diner in Ponder, TX that originally opened in 1948. Ranchman's is known for its steaks, chicken-fried steaks, and pies. The location has been featured on Food Network's FoodNation with Bobby Flay as well as being featured in the 1967 film Bonnie and Clyde. The location is said to be the location where 1986 Pulitzer Prize winning novel Lonesome Dove got its name, according to the book's author Larry McMurtry.

== History ==
The Ranchman's building, constructed in 1903 as a restaurant, later housed a barbershop where the grill now stands. Post-Great Depression, another family converted it into a hardware and general store.

On Thanksgiving Day 1948, Grace "Pete" Jackson opened Ranchman's doors, inspired by the popularity of her grocery store's lunch counter next door. In 1992, Dave Ross purchased Ranchman's, having started there in 1973 as the weekend grill cook, butcher, and baker.

The diner closed down for 3 years during the COVID-19 pandemic for renovations. Shortly after reopening for business in March 2023, owner Dave Ross closed the diner for good on October 30, 2023. In August 2026, the restaurant was reopened by local businessman Marty Bryan as Ranchman's by Marty B.
