= Volley Murphy =

Former American football wide receiver

- Murphy, 1967

No. 33
- Position: Split end

Personal information
- Born: October 4, 1945; Regan, Texas, U.S.
- Died: November 26, 2007 (aged 62); Lantana, Texas, U.S.
- Listed height: 5 ft 10 in (1.78 m)
- Listed weight: 180 lb (82 kg)

Career information
- High school: Booker T. Washington (Lantana, TX)
- College: Cisco Junior College (1965–1966); UTEP (1967–1968)

Career history
- Minnesota Vikings (1969–1971)*; Edmonton Eskimos (1971–1972); Southern California Sun (1974)
- * Offseason or practice squad member only

Awards and highlights
- First-team NJCAA All-American (1966)

Vollie James Murphy III (October 4, 1945 – November 25, 2007) was an American football split end. A junior-college All-American in 1966 at Cisco Junior College, he broke a UTEP season record and ranked sixth nationally with 876 receiving yards in 1967. He also played professional football in the National Football League with the Minnesota Vikings (1969–1971), in the Canadian Football League with the Edmonton Eskimos (1971–1972), and in the World Football League with the Southern California Sun (1974).

== Early life ==
Murphy was born in 1945 at Regan, Texas. grew up in Marlin, Texas, and attended Booker T. Washington High School there.

== College football ==
Murphy played college football for Cisco Junior College in 1965 and 1966 and for the UTEP Miners in 1967 and 1968. In 1966, he scored 30 points in one game and set a school record with 111 points for the season. He was selected as a first-team player on the 1996 National Junior College Athletic Association's All-America team; he was the first Cisco player to receive first-team All-America honors.

Murphy transferred to UTEP for the 1967 season and ranked sixth nationally with 876 receiving yards, fourth with an average of 21.9 yards per reception, and second with 12 receiving touchdowns. Despite his contributions to the 1967 UTEP team, including being the team's top scorer, he was declared ineligible under an NCAA junior-college transfer rule from participating in the team's postseason bowl game.

As a senior in 1968, he suffered an ankle injury in a preseason scrimmage, but he came back from the injury to tally 32 receptions for 614 yards and seven touchdowns.

== Professional football ==
He was drafted by the Minnesota Vikings in the second round (43 overall) of the 1969 NFL draft. He was with the Vikings for parts of three seasons (1969–1971) but did not appear in any regular-season games. He played for the Edmonton Eskimos of the Canadian Football League (CFL) in 1971, tallying 14 receptions for 351 yards and two touchdowns. He also played for the Southern California Sun of the World Football League in 1974.

== Later life ==
Murphy died in November 2007 at Lantana, Texas, age 62.
