= Copper Canyon, Texas =

Copper Canyon
- Town
- Location of Copper Canyon in Denton County, Texas
- Coordinates: 33°05′46″N 97°05′52″W
- Country: United States
- State: Texas
- County: Denton

Area
  - Total: 4.61 sq mi (11.93 km^{2})
  - Land: 4.58 sq mi (11.85 km^{2})
  - Water: 0.027 sq mi (0.07 km^{2})
- Elevation: 630 ft (190 m)

Population (2020)
  - Total: 1,731
  - Density: 378.3/sq mi (146.1/km^{2})
- Time zone: UTC-6 (Central (CST))
  - Summer (DST): UTC-5 (CDT)
- ZIP Code: 75077
- FIPS code: 48-16636
- GNIS feature ID: 2413241
- Website: www.coppercanyon-tx.org

Copper Canyon is a town in Denton County, Texas, United States. The population was 1,731 in 2020. Copper Canyon is adjacent to the master-planned Lantana residential development.

== History ==
The first European settlement in the area that would become Copper Canyon took place in the 1840s. One of the more prominent settler families was that of Elisha and Mary Chinn, who came to Texas from their original home in North Carolina in 1852. They helped establish the first church in the area, a log-cabin chapel which eventually became known as the Chinn's Chapel Methodist Church. The church is still active on what is now known as Chinn Chapel Road.

The town gradually grew with cattle ranching as the mainstay of the local economy. The railroad came to the area in 1881, and the first public school was constructed in 1884. The town apparently took its name from "Copperhead Canyon," a part of the area formerly known for venomous snakes. Population, never large, generally stagnated or declined in the first half of the twentieth century. After World War II the area's rural charm slowly began to attract residents from the more crowded parts of the Dallas/Fort Worth metroplex.

The town was formally incorporated in 1973. Although still rather sparsely populated, the town has grown as part of the general development of areas north of the Dallas/Fort Worth International Airport. Census Bureau figures tell the story: 465 (1980), 978 (1990), 1,216 (2000), 1,334 (2010). Traditional ranches are still found in the area, but Copper Canyon has become primarily a bedroom community with little commercial development.

== Geography ==
According to the United States Census Bureau, the town has a total area of 4.5 square miles (12 km^{2}), of which 4.4 square miles (11 km^{2}) is land and 0.22% is water.

== Demographics ==
Historical population
Census	Pop.	Note	%±
1980	465		—
1990	978		110.3%
2000	1,216		24.3%
2010	1,334		9.7%
2020	1,731		29.8%
2023 (est.)	2,171	▲	25.4%
U.S. Decennial Census

Copper Canyon racial composition as of 2020 (NH = Non-Hispanic) (Note: Note: the US Census treats Hispanic/Latino as an ethnic category. This table excludes Latinos from the racial categories and assigns them to a separate category. Hispanics/Latinos can be of any race.)
Race	Number	Percentage
White (NH)	1,434	82.84%
Black or African American (NH)	21	1.21%
Native American or Alaska Native (NH)	12	0.69%
Asian (NH)	51	2.95%
Pacific Islander (NH)	1	0.06%
Some Other Race (NH)	12	0.69%
Mixed/Multi-Racial (NH)	63	3.64%
Hispanic or Latino	137	7.91%
Total	1,731	

As of the 2020 United States census, there were 1,731 people, 553 households, and 513 families residing in the town.

== Local notes ==
The Town of Copper Canyon is served by the Lewisville and Denton Independent School Districts.

The town contracts with neighboring communities for most municipal services, such as fire protection from Argyle Fire Department, police services from Denton County Sheriff's Department, and ambulance service from Lewisville. The town boasts of a low tax rate and a number of horse trails maintained for local riders.

Copper Canyon is also home to the Old Alton Bridge, a registered national historic site. Purportedly haunted, it is locally known as the "Goatman's Bridge".

== Education ==
Most of Copper Canyon is in the Lewisville Independent School District, while a portion to the west is in the Denton Independent School District.

Most of Denton ISD Copper Canyon is zoned to Adkins Elementary School, while small parcels are zoned to Blanton Elementary School. All of the Denton ISD part is zoned to Harpool Middle School, and Guyer High School.

== Notable person ==
- Dick Armey, former U.S. Representative from Texas' 26th congressional district (1985–2003) and House Majority Leader (1995–2003)
