= Pioneer Woman (Friedlander) =

- Pioneer Woman Monument
- U.S. National Register of Historic Places
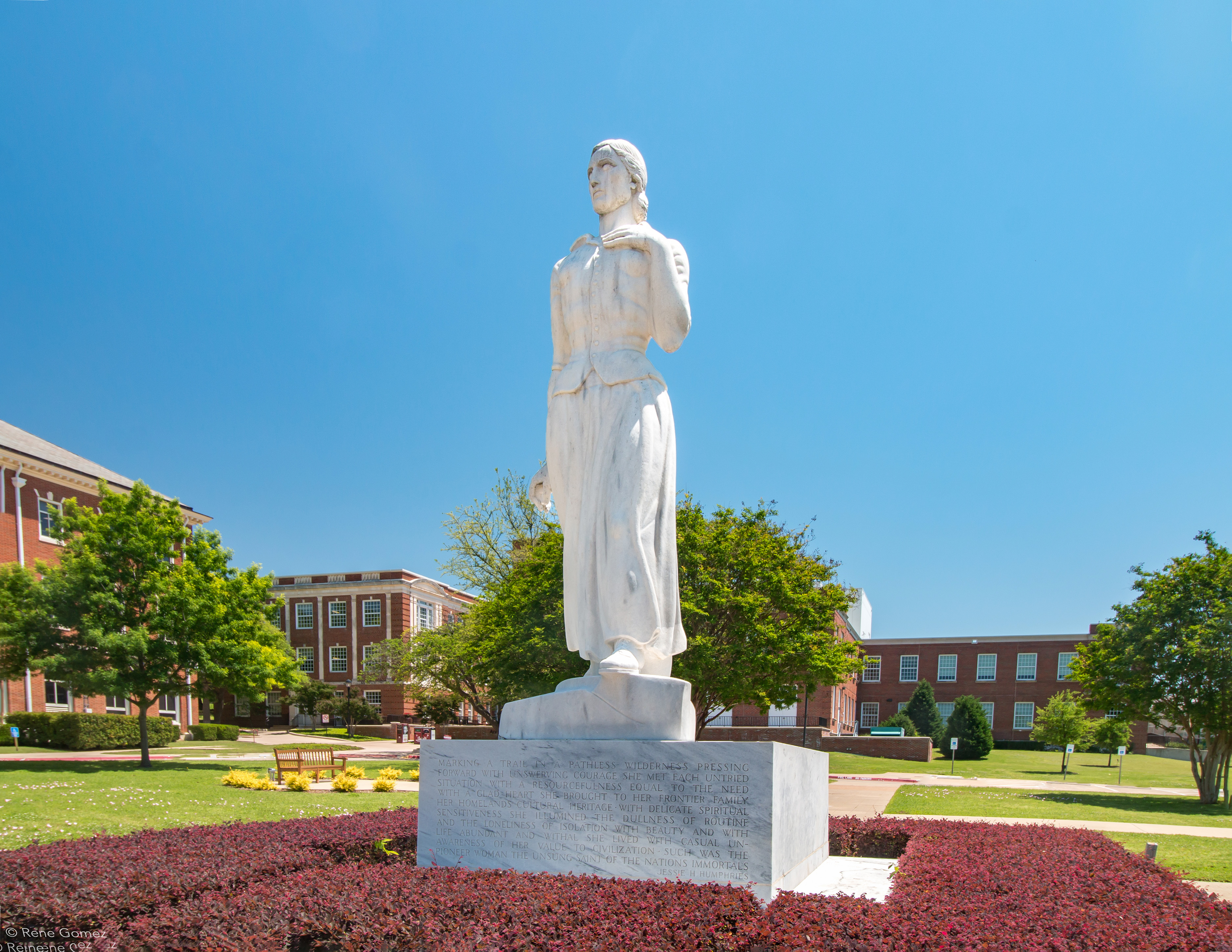
- Pioneer Woman Monument in 2018

- Location within Texas Location within the United States
- Location: Pioneer Cir., Texas Woman's University, Denton, Texas
- Coordinates: 33°13′24″N 97°7′46″W
- Area: less than one acre
- Built: 1936
- Sculptor: Leo Friedlander
- MPS: Monuments and Buildings of the Texas Centennial MPS
- NRHP reference No.: 100002347
- Added to NRHP: April 19, 2018

The Pioneer Woman statue is a work created by sculptor Leo Friedlander. It is located at the Texas Woman's University (TWU) in Denton, Texas, United States, and was commissioned as part of the Texas Centenary celebrations to mark the 100th anniversary of Texas Independence from Mexico. The sculpture was added to the National Register of Historic Places in 2018.

== The beginning ==
On June 3, 1935, the Board of Regents at TWU passed a resolution stating that it urged "the Centennial Commission of Control to allocate the sum of $30,000 for the erection of a statue to the Pioneer Women of Texas to be erected on the campus as a part of the Centennial celebration. The idea for this statue originated with this institution, and . . . . . . the erection of this statue on the campus will serve the women of the entire State, and will inspire their daughters to continued reference for the heroism and sacrifice of the pioneer women of the past who helped to make the Texas of the present."

University President L.H. Hubbard, proposed the a statue to the Centennial Commission who agreed and responded by announcing an open competition for sculptors to design the statue. However "the design of the statue, including the choice of the sculptor, the design, etc, were to be handled under the direction of the State Board of Control, and that the College had nothing whatever to do with the matter." The Board at that time had to be satisfied with recommending a site on campus where the statue would be placed. In June 1936, the TWU Board of Regents passed a motion requesting that the Texas Centennial Commission "erect a Memorial Chapel to Pioneer Women on the campus instead of the Statue as proposed at the present time." Had either the Regents or the members of the Centennial Commission known what lay ahead they might well have agreed to this request, and as it turned out, the university did eventually get its chapel, the Little Chapel in the Woods, designed by architect O'Neil Ford. First lady Eleanor Roosevelt spoke at its dedication in 1939.

== The competition ==
The sculpture in 2011

By October 1936, plans for the statue were moving forward by "inviting a group of leading American sculptors, about 80 in number, to submit photographs of their work and from this group several sculptors are to be chosen who will be required to submit models of the proposed statue to the Centennial Commission of Control and if the first model submitted is not acceptable other models will be submitted until an accepted group is submitted." Foreshadowing if ever there was.

Among the artists who entered the competition was the Texas sculptor Waldine Tauch, who entered seven different competitions conducted by the Commission. She was to win three of them (memorials to Moses Austin, Isaac and Frances Van Zandt and First Shot Fired For Texas Independence monument) but she was not able to garner the Pioneer Woman statue. However, she was to play a part in the ensuing drama.

It is not yet clear how many plaster models were submitted, but a "jury of professionals" unanimously chose the one submitted by William Zorach, a sculptor from New York, which included not just a settler woman, or a woman and child as did Tauch's model, but the entire family: mother, father, son and daughter. And they were all nude. Nudity was seen, by some, as being appropriate for Classical, allegorical or symbolical portrayals but was unacceptable for Texas settler women. Upon learning of the commission's decision, Tauch "wasted no time telephoning and writing letters to many friends throughout the state to report the incident." "Anguished protests from Texans swelled into a controversy dwarfing all previous ones (in Zorach's career). One astute observer noted the woman had no wedding ring .... while a chapter of the Daughters of the Republic of Texas declared it, 'the greatest insult that could be offered to these women who believed and practiced the virtue of modesty' ." Zorach wrote "The newspapers said that if a Texas pioneer had gone around in such a state of nudity he would have been strung to the nearest tree. ... Gutzon Borglum was down there at the time and I was told that he said my figures looked like a bunch of apes," a remark that was widely quoted by opponents of the statue at the time.

Richard Foster Howard, then director of the Dallas Museum of Art, defended Zorach and the sculptor went so far as to revise his model so that the figures were clothed, but the damage had been done.

It did not take long for the public outcry to induce the commission to reverse its decision, to declare that there was no winner of the competition. "The commission was given quietly and without publicity to Leo Friedlander, a sculptor who had not ever entered the competition."

The statue was modeled, and then following its approval by the various committees in Texas, carved by the Piccirilli Brothers in New York City. At some point in the carving process, someone, either Friedlander or the Piccirilli carvers, became concerned that the statue's right hand and her right thumb and forefinger might be too weak to be self-supporting, so a small block of marble was left to add strength. Often such aids are removed in the work's final carving; they were not in this case.

For the base of the statue, the Dean of Women, Jessie H. Humphries, composed the following inscription:

"Marking a trail in a pathless wilderness pressing forward with unswerving courage she met each untried situation with a resourcefulness equal to the need. With a glad heart she brought to her frontier family her homelands cultural heritage. With delicate spiritual sensitiveness she illuminated the dullness of routine and the loneliness of isolation with beauty and with life abundant and with all she lived with casual unawareness of her value to civilization. Such was the pioneer woman. The unsung saint of the nations immortals."

On another side of the base the carvers included Leo Friedlander's name.

Years later, Zorach's statue, still without clothes, was cast in bronze and obtained by a Colorado bank. It was "discovered" in a courtyard of the bank's branch in Pueblo, Colorado. Later it was moved to Denver and now (2010) resides in front of the Colorado Springs Fine Arts Center.

== See also ==
- National Register of Historic Places listings in Denton County, Texas
