= Rector Road Bridge =

- U.S. National Register of Historic Places
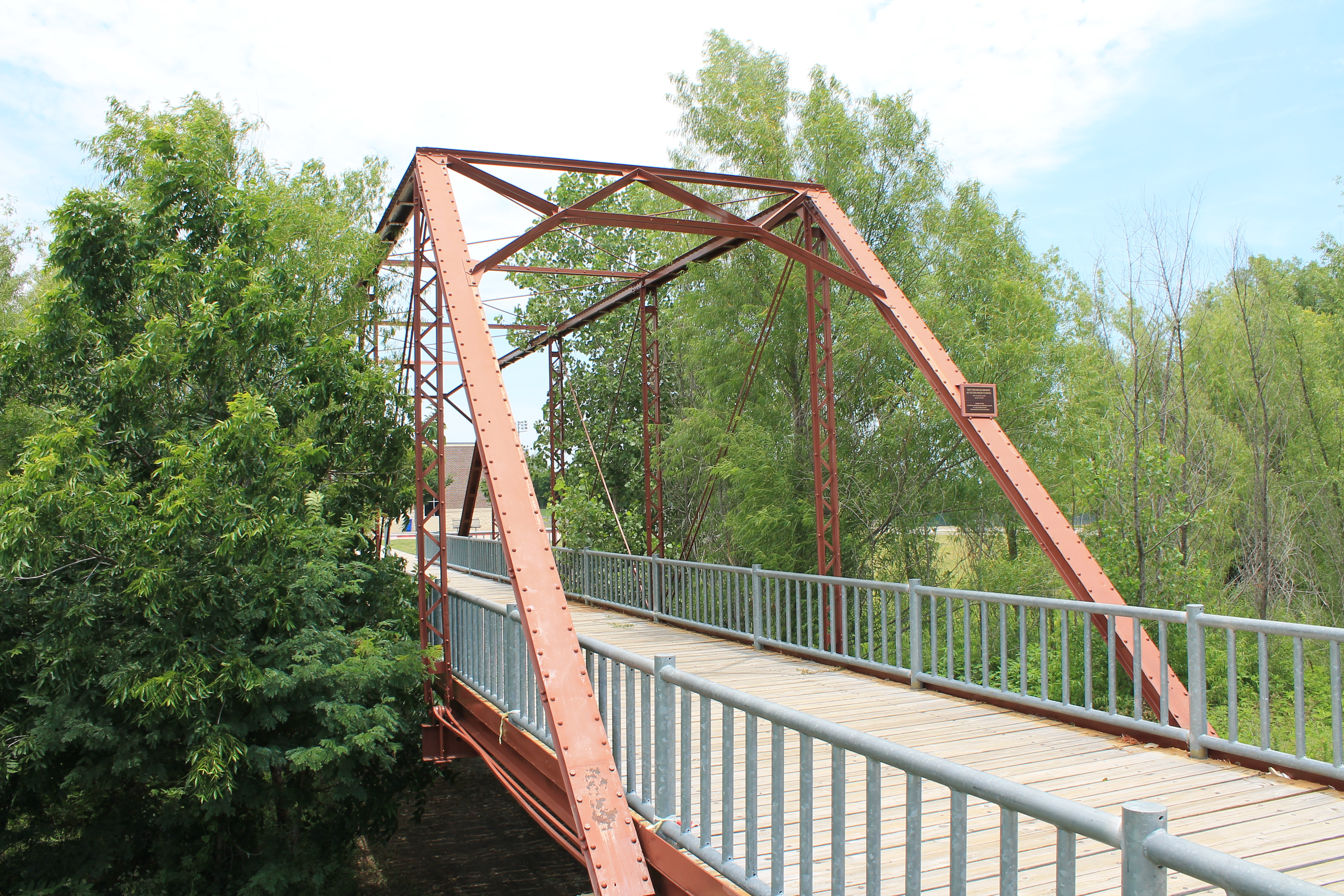
- Rector Road Bridge in 2012

- Location within Texas Location within the United States
- Location: 7501 Teasley Lane
- Nearest city: Denton, Texas
- Coordinates: 33°7′45″N 97°6′15″W
- Area: less than one acre
- Built: 1907-08
- Built by: Austin Brothers
- Architectural style: Pratt through-truss bridge
- MPS: Historic Bridges of Texas MPS
- NRHP reference No.: 03001418
- Added to NRHP: January 14, 2004

Rector Road Bridge is a historic truss bridge in Denton, Texas. It was added to the National Register of Historic Places in 2004.

It is a 5-panel, pinned Pratt through-truss bridge with I-beam approach spans. It is 112 feet (34 m) in total length, with the primary span 80 feet (24 m) in length.

It was built by the Austin Brothers Company in 1907–08 to span Clear Creek near Sanger, Texas, costing $1,664. Frank and George Austin were then the Atlanta and Dallas agents of the George E. King Bridge Company, although they later started their own bridge fabrication plant.

It was later moved to the John Guyer High School at 7501 Teasley Lane in Denton.

== Gallery ==
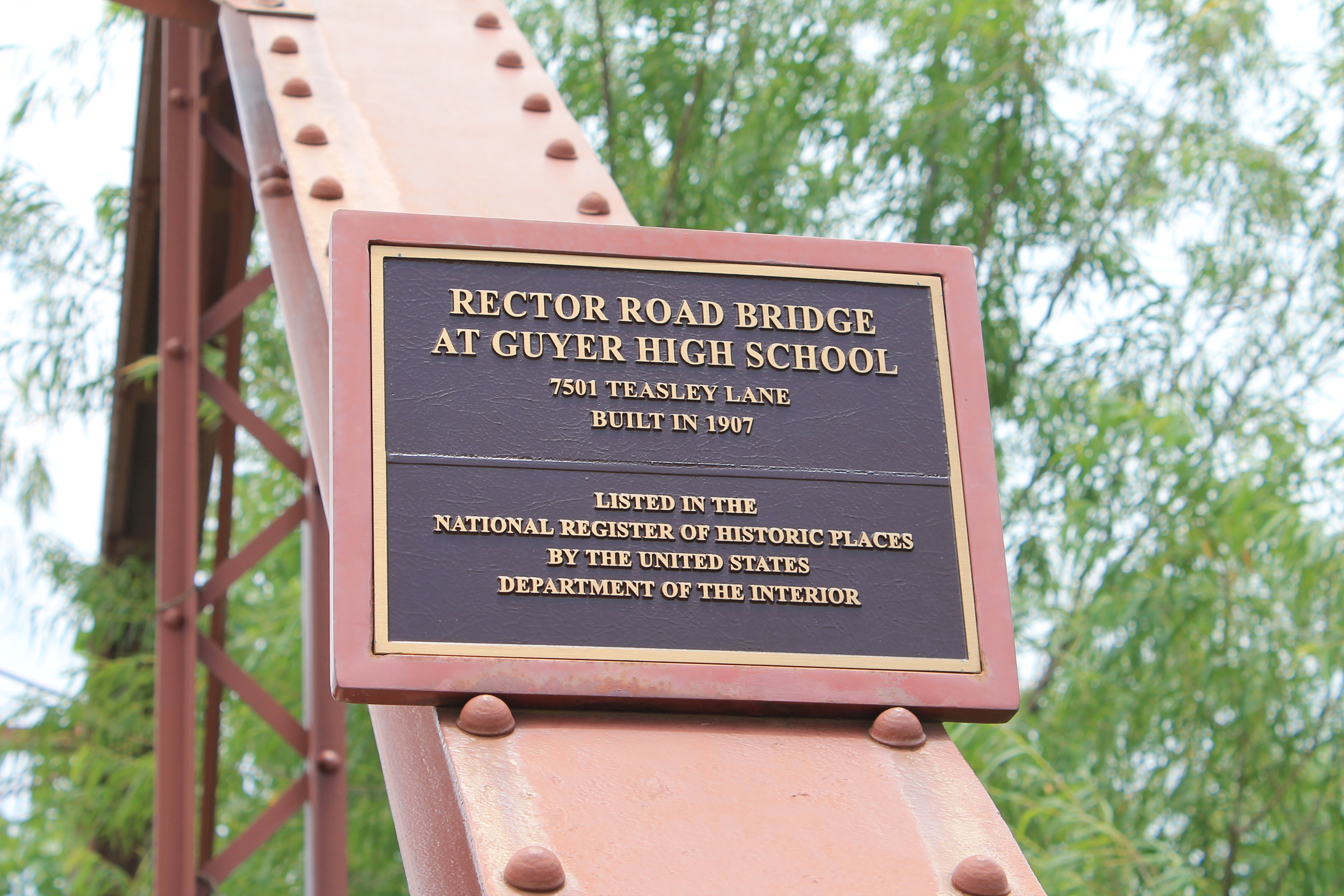

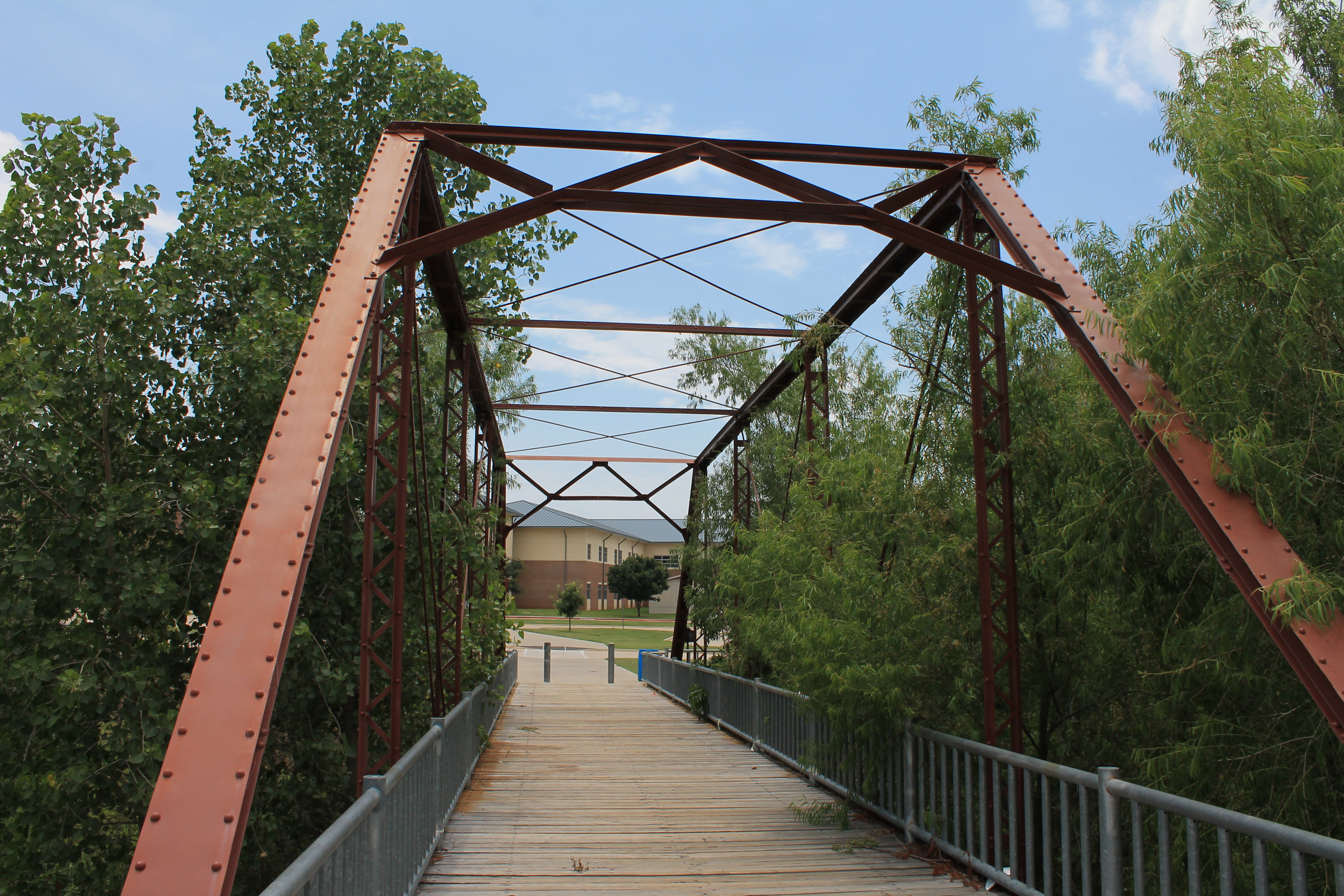

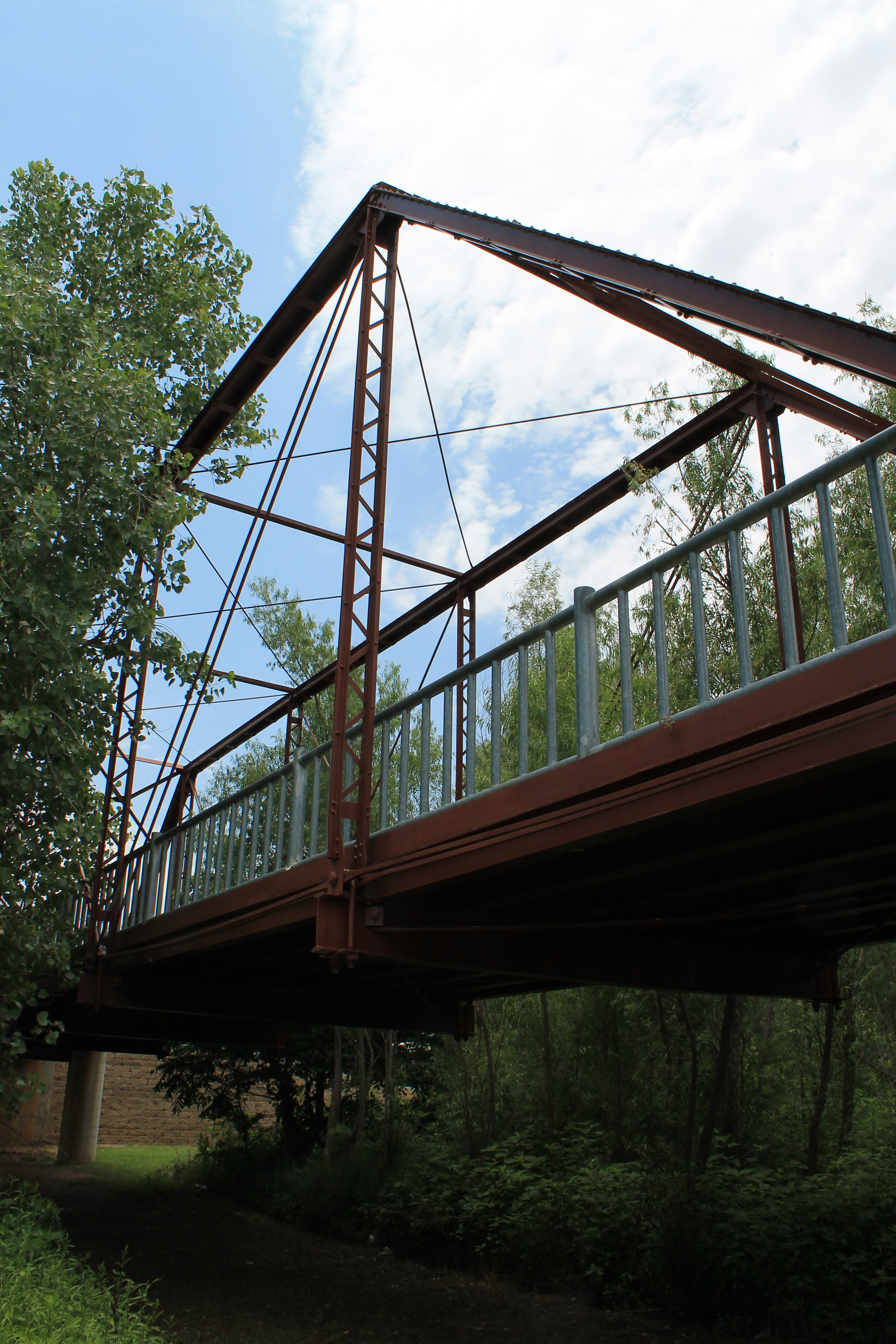

== See also ==
- National Register of Historic Places listings in Denton County, Texas
- List of bridges on the National Register of Historic Places in Texas
