= Dish, Texas =

DISH, Texas
- Town
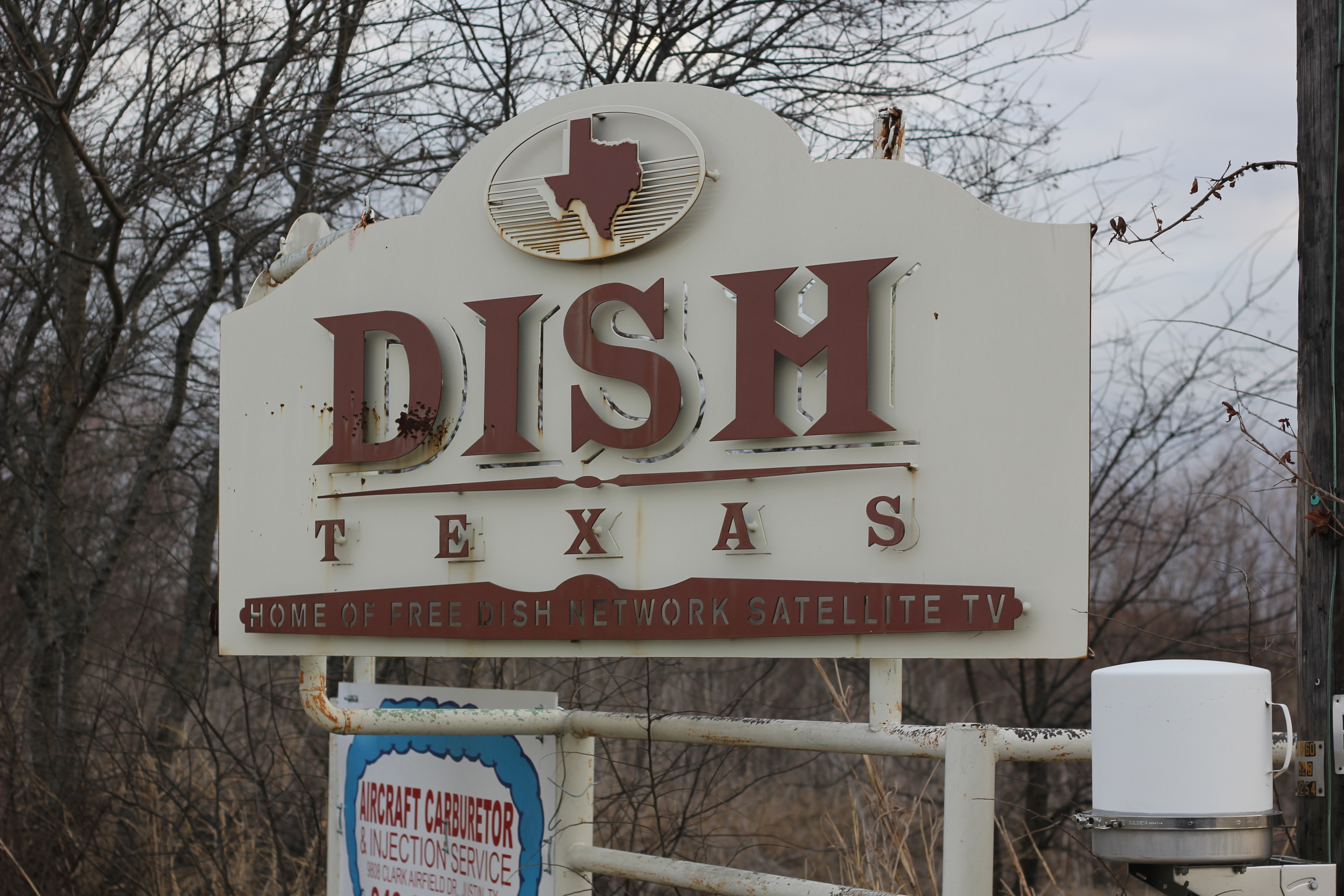

- Location of DISH in Denton County, Texas

- Location within the state of Texas DISH, Texas (the United States)
- Coordinates: 33°07′40″N 97°18′23″W
- Country: United States
- State: Texas
- County: Denton
- Established: June 2000
- Named for: Dish Network

Area
  - Total: 1.66 sq mi (4.29 km^{2})
  - Land: 1.65 sq mi (4.28 km^{2})
  - Water: 0.0039 sq mi (0.01 km^{2})
- Elevation: 696 ft (212 m)

Population (2020)
  - Total: 437
  - Density: 264/sq mi (102/km^{2})
- Time zone: UTC-6 (Central (CST))
  - Summer (DST): UTC-5 (CDT)
- FIPS code: 48-20540
- GNIS feature ID: 2412433
- Website: www.townofdish.com

DISH is a town in Denton County, Texas, United States. The population of DISH was 437 at the 2020 United States Census. This community, established in June 2000, was originally named Clark. In November 2005, the community accepted an offer to rename itself "DISH" (all capital letters) as part of a commercial agreement with the satellite television company Dish Network.

== History ==
The settlement was originally named for its founder, Landis Clark, who incorporated the town in June 2000 and was its first mayor. In exchange for renaming the town to DISH, all residents received a free basic television service for ten years and a free digital video recorder from Dish Network.

=== Air quality ===
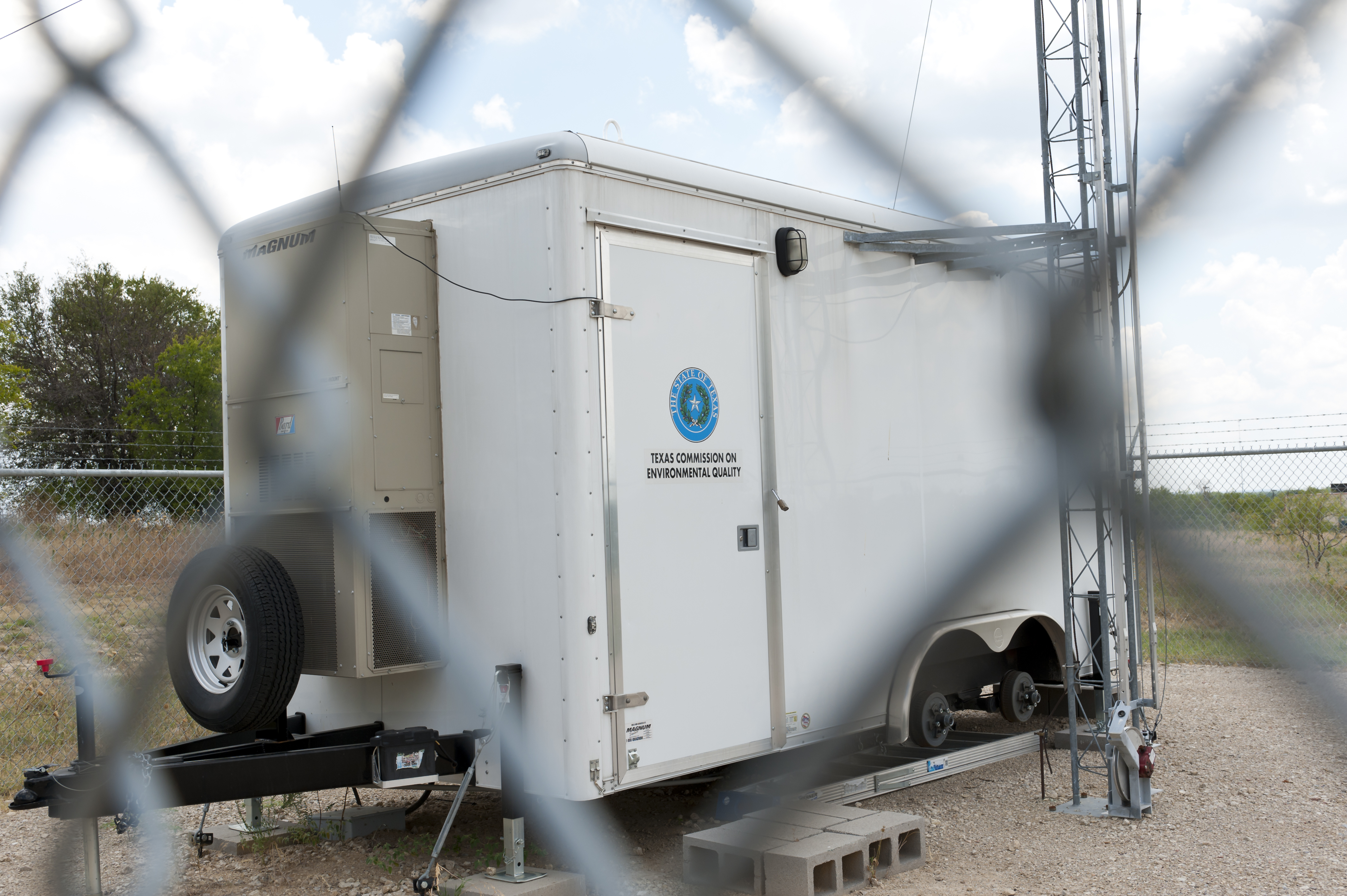
Air quality monitoring station in DISH

In 2005, energy companies began drilling natural gas wells at DISH. Residents complained of foul smells and of health issues that they linked to the gas (natural gas, methane and benzene) emissions from the wells. The town spent $15,000 on an air quality test, which found elevated levels of several chemicals including benzene. Following that, the energy companies made changes.

In response to concerns about the town's air quality, the Texas Department of State Health Services conducted air quality tests and, in May 2010, released its results for DISH, including tests of blood and urine samples from 28 DISH residents that were tested for volatile organic compounds (VOCs). The agency concluded that:

The information obtained from this investigation did not indicate that community-wide exposures from gas wells or compressor stations were occurring in the sample population. This conclusion was based on the pattern of VOC values found in the samples. Other sources of exposure such as cigarette smoking, the presence of disinfectant by-products in drinking water, and consumer or occupational/hobby related products could explain many of the findings.

The state installed an air quality monitoring station at DISH, which showed that, in 2012, air pollutants were generally within government limits.

An article about the air quality in DISH by NPR in 2012 stated that "better studies are needed" to test for the health effects of drilling emissions, and also that the installation of gas wells in populated places "is way out ahead of public health evaluations of any kind to date".

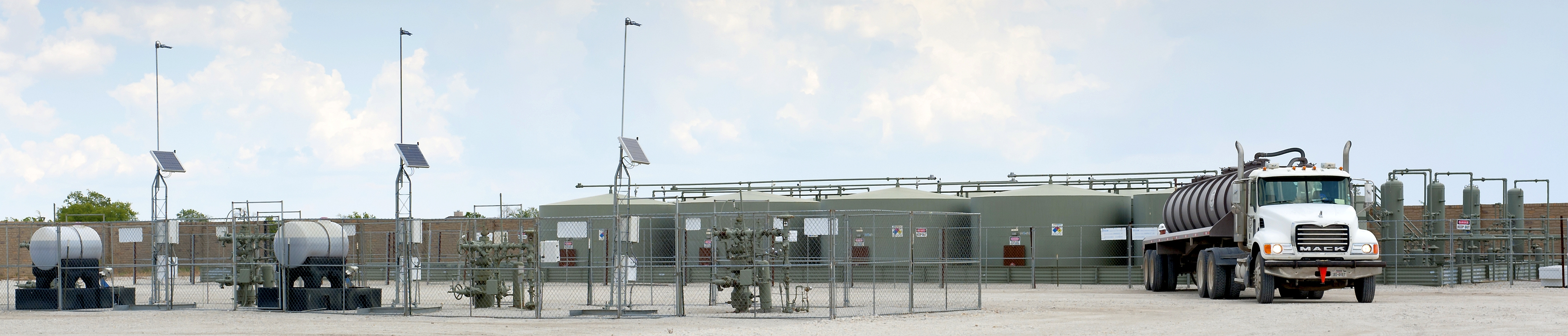
Natural gas facility in Dish, 2012

== Demographics ==
Historical population
Census	Pop.	Note	%±
2010	201		—
2020	437		117.4%
2023 (est.)	442	▲	1.1%
U.S. Decennial Census

The population in 2010 was 201, and the estimated population for 2015 was 387. The population of DISH was 437 at the 2020 United States Census.

== Education ==
DISH is zoned to the Ponder Independent School District. Ponder High School is its comprehensive high school.

== In popular culture ==
In the January 10, 2006 episode of Comedy Central's The Daily Show, correspondent Ed Helms presented a segment about DISH.

Household Name, a podcast by Business Insider, produced an episode on DISH, "A Town Called DISH", that was aired on June 12, 2019.
