= Joe McQueen =

American jazz saxophonist (1919–2019)

- Born: Joe Leandrew McQueen; May 30, 1919; Ponder, Texas, U.S.
- Died: December 7, 2019 (aged 100) Ogden, Utah, U.S.
- Genres: Jazz
- Occupation: Musician
- Instrument: Saxophone
- Years active: 1930s–2019

Joe McQueen (May 30, 1919 – December 7, 2019) was an American jazz saxophonist.

== Biography ==
McQueen was born in Ponder, Texas, and raised in Ardmore, Oklahoma. His father left when he was a young boy and his mother died when he was 14 years old, after which he lived with his grandparents. He was introduced to the saxophone by his cousin, Herschel Evans, a saxophonist with Count Basie during the 1930s. He developed a relationship with Thelma, whom he met on a dance floor in Ardmore, and they married on June 10, 1944.

McQueen toured with bands throughout the United States. While passing through Ogden, Utah, with his wife Thelma in 1945, the leader of the band McQueen was in at the time took the group's money, later losing it while gambling on the way to Las Vegas.

McQueen and wife Thelma decided to remain in Ogden. He performed with jazz musicians when they stopped in Utah, such as Charlie Parker, Chet Baker, Paul Gonsalves, Lester Young, Count Basie, Duke Ellington, Dizzy Gillespie, Nat King Cole, Louis Armstrong, Cab Calloway, and Ray Charles.

In 1962 he played in Idaho Falls, Idaho, with Hoagy Carmichael.

As he approached the age of 100, he was still performing.

== Awards and honours ==
McQueen was the subject of the documentary film King of O-Town. In 2002, the governor of Utah established April 18 as Joe McQueen Day. In 2019, the Utah legislature honored his 100th birthday.

== Health and death ==
McQueen was diagnosed with throat cancer in 1969 after years of smoking. He underwent surgery and quit playing for several years.

McQueen died on the morning of December 7, 2019, at the age of 100. He was survived by his wife of seventy-five years, Thelma.
