= Camey Spur, Texas =

Town in Denton County, Texas, US

- Unincorporated community
- Location within the state of Texas Camey Spur (the United States)
- Coordinates: 33°05′0″N 96°51′22″W
- Country: United States
- State: Texas
- County: Denton
- Elevation: 620 ft (190 m)
- Time zone: UTC-6 (Central (CST))
  - Summer (DST): UTC-5 (CDT)
- ZIP codes: 75056
- Area codes: 214, 469, 972, 945
- GNIS feature ID: 1378087

Camey Spur (Camey) was a small town in southeastern Denton County, Texas, located at what is now the intersection of State Highway 121 and W Spring Creek Pkwy. It was established around 1852 and named after Capt. William McKamy, as his family donated land for the construction of the Frisco Spur, part of the St. Louis–San Francisco Railway. Not to be confused with Spur, Texas, a post office operated in Camey Spur from 1913 through 1925. According to a Dallas Morning News archive, in 1914 the community had a cotton gin that burnt down in 1925, two general stores, and a population of 30. During the 1930s and 1940s, it had two businesses and a population of forty-seven. The city of Frisco, Texas, built Camey Spur Park near the original town in 2024.
