= Ponder Independent School District =

School district in Texas, US

Address
- 400 West Bailey Street Ponder, TX, USA ESC Region 11
- Coordinates: 33°11′2″N 97°17′43″W

District information
- Type: Independent School District
- Motto: Made For Greatness
- Grades: PK-12
- Established: 1947; 79 years ago
- Superintendent: Dr. James Hill
- Governing agency: Texas Education Agency
- NCES District ID: 4835310

Students and staff
- Students: 1740 (2025-2026)
- Athletic conference: UIL Class AAA
- District mascot: Lions
- Colors: Red, White, & Gray

Other information
- Website: www.ponderisd.net

Ponder Independent School District (Ponder ISD or PISD) is a public school district based in Ponder, Texas, United States. Covering approximately 54 square miles in Denton County, the district serves Ponder and DISH, portions of Denton and Northlake, along with portions of unincorporated Denton County.

As of 2026, Ponder ISD operates 3 campus, including 1 high school, 1 middle school, and 1 elementary school. The district most recently received a "B" rating from the Texas Education Agency (TEA).

== History ==
In 1999, Ponder ISD opened a new campus for Ponder High School (grades 7-12) and 4 new classrooms were added to Ponder Elementary School (PK-6).

A $16,000,000 bond proposition was passed in November 2001 to build a new campus for PES, new administration building, renovate the existing elementary facility into a junior high, and improve athletic facilities. The new Ponder Elementary School opened in 2003.

In 2005, Ponder Junior High School opened with grades 6-8 at the former elementary facility. PHS then served grades 9-12 and PES grades PK-5.

A $13,400,000 bond proposition was passed in 2007 to add a new gym to PJH, build a football stadium, and fund several other additions for the district.

In 2020, voters approved a $160,000,000 bond proposition to build a new PHS facility with an initial capacity of 800 students, renovate existing schools, and provide other upgrades.

The new Ponder High School opened in 2024. PJH subsequently moved to the former PHS campus. The former PJH building was reopened as Ponder Upper Elementary School, with grades 4-5, while students in PK-3 remained at the newly renamed Ponder Lower Elementary School.

In May 2026, the district held another bond election. The $290,640,000 Proposition A was approved to expand PHS, build two new elementary schools and a new administration building, provide various other upgrades and renovations, and fund new land acquisitions. Proposition C was passed to fund $4,000,000 in technology upgrades, while Proposition B was rejected by voters, which would have provided $10,362,297 in stadium upgrades.

== Schools ==
Name	Grades	Established	Additional information
Ponder High School	9-12	Unknown	Current campus opened in 2024
Ponder Junior High School	6-8	2005	Moved to current campus in 2024
Ponder Upper Elementary School	4-5	2024	
Ponder Lower Elementary School	PK-3	Unknown	Current campus opened in 2003

== Athletics ==
- The Ponder High School boys basketball team has captured the state championship five times, three of them consecutively. These include the 2001, 2008, 2009, 2010, and 2014 AA Boys State Basketball Championships.
- The Ponder High School girls basketball team has made two appearances in the state tournament.
- Ponder High School began a football program in 2007. The Lions played their first varsity level UIL sanctioned football game in the fall of 2010.
