= Krum Independent School District =

School district in Texas

Address
- 1200 Bobcat Boulevard Krum, TX, USA ESC Region 11
- Coordinates: 33°15′58″N 97°13′50″W

District information
- Type: Independent School District
- Motto: Preparing today's students for tomorrow's challenges.
- Grades: PK-12
- Established: 1947; 79 years ago
- Superintendent: Dr. Jason Cochran
- Governing agency: Texas Education Agency
- Schools: 5
- NCES District ID: 4825980

Students and staff
- Students: 2578 (2025-2026)
- Athletic conference: UIL Class AAAA
- District mascot: Bobcats
- Colors: Blue; White

Other information
- Website: www.krumisd.net

Krum Independent School District (Krum ISD or KISD) is a public school district based in Krum, Texas, United States. Covering approximately 73 square miles, the district serves the Krum and portions of Denton, unincorporated Denton County, and unincorporated Wise County.

As of 2026, Krum ISD operates 5 schools, including 1 high school, 1 middle school, and 3 elementary schools. The district most recently received a "C" rating from the Texas Education Agency (TEA).

== History ==
As of 1984, Krum operated 3 schools: Krum High School (grades 9-12), Krum Middle School (6-8), and Hattie Dyer Elementary School (K-5). Pre-kindergarten (PK) was added to Dyer ES in 1989.

Krum Intermediate School (3-6) opened in 1990, with Dyer ES serving PK-2 and KMS housing grades 7-8. In 1996, KIS was renamed for Blanche Dodd. In 2002, 6th grade moved from Dodd Intermediate back to KMS.

Krum Early Education Center (PK-1) opened in 2008, leading to a grade reconfiguration at Dyer ES (2-3) and Dodd IS (4-5).

In 2019, the Dodd campus was converted from an intermediate to an elementary school. Both Dyer and Dodd then served grades 2-5.

In 2022, Krum ISD passed the $224,700,000 bond Proposition A to expand Krum EEC, renovate and repurpose Dyer Elementary, build a new elementary school, and build a replacement campus for Krum High School. The $30,300,000 Proposition B to fund a new athletic stadium at the new high school site failed.

In 2023, due to rising construction costs, Krum ISD realized it could no longer afford to build everything promised with the approved bond funds. Instead of building a new high school campus, KISD decided to build a new Krum Middle School that could be expanded into a high school at a later date. The existing KHS would instead be renovated and expanded.

In 2024, Krum EEC was reopened as Dixie Hansel Elementary School after receiving an addition. All three elementary schools began serving grades PK-5.

The new Krum Middle School opened in 2026.

== Athletics ==
Until 2011 Krum was one of the few districts in Texas that did not participate in high-school football, which is extremely rare in Texas. A bond election, which would have built a football stadium, was narrowly defeated in November 2006, but was placed on the ballot again in 2007 and was passed. The 2008 school year saw Krum Middle School play the district's first ever football games (defeating the middle school B teams from powerhouse Celina in both the 7th and 8th grade contests). Krum fielded a varsity team in 2011 and played an "outlaw schedule" (i.e., not assigned to a district); the team played its first UIL-sanctioned schedule in 2012 as a member of Class AAA and finished with a 9-1 season.

Its boys basketball team has won five state championships (1971, 1978, 1994, 1996, and 1998).

== Schools ==
=== Current schools ===
| Name | Grades | Established | Additional information |
|---|---|---|---|
| Krum High School | 9-12 | Unknown | |
| Krum Middle School | 6-8 | Unknown | Current campus opened in 2026 |
| Dodd Elementary School | PK-5 | 1990 | Intermediate campus from 1990-2019 |
| Dyer Elementary School | PK-5 | Unknown | |
| Hansel Elementary School | PK-5 | 2009 | Krum Early Education Center from 2009-2024 |
