= Old Alton Bridge =

- U.S. National Register of Historic Places
- Recorded Texas Historic Landmark
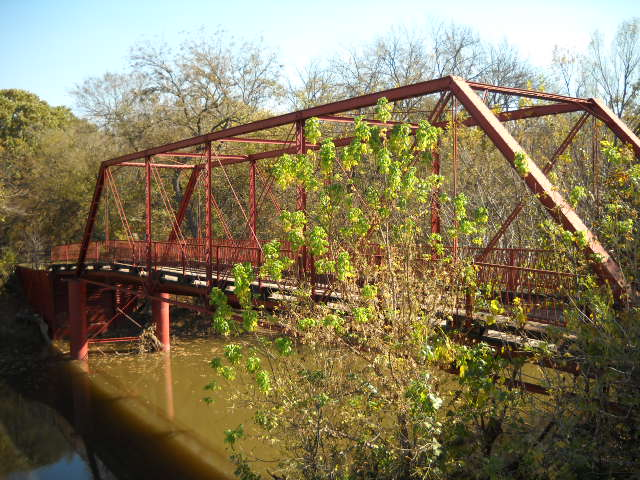
- Old Alton Bridge

- Location within Texas Location within the United States
- Nearest city: Copper Canyon, Texas
- Coordinates: 33°7′45″N 97°6′13″W
- Area: less than one acre
- Built: 1884
- Architect: King Iron & Bridge Manufacturing Co.
- Architectural style: Pratt through-truss bridge
- NRHP reference No.: 88000979
- RTHL No.: 16364

Significant dates
- Added to NRHP: July 8, 1988
- Designated RTHL: 2010

Old Alton Bridge, also known as Goatman's Bridge, is a historic iron truss bridge connecting the Texas cities of Denton and Copper Canyon. Built in 1884 by the King Iron Bridge Manufacturing Company, it originally carried horses and later automobiles over Hickory Creek at a location that once was a popular ford for crossing cattle. The bridge takes its name from the abandoned community of Alton, which between 1850 and 1856 was the seat of Denton County. This bridge is the subject of several ghostlore stories featuring a vengeful ghost.

The heavily traveled Old Alton Bridge remained in constant use until 2001 when vehicle traffic was moved to an adjacent concrete-and-steel bridge. Prior to the new bridge, it was necessary for motorists to signal with a car horn before crossing the single-lane span. The new bridge straightened out a sharp curve on both sides of the creek and provided additional travel lanes.

With vehicle traffic removed, the bridge became an important link connecting the Elm Fork and Pilot Knoll Hiking and Equestrian Trails. Today, it is a popular location for nature enthusiasts and photographers. Old Alton Bridge was included in the National Register of Historic Places on July 8, 1988.

== Ghostlore ==
Locally, the bridge is known as Goatman's Bridge, as it is said to be haunted by a half-man half-goat figure called Goatman. The belief is based on the legend of a black goat farmer named Oscar Washburn, who was said to have moved his family to a residence just north of the bridge. A few years later, Washburn, having become known as a dependable and honest businessman and dubbed the "Goatman" by locals, displayed a sign on Alton Bridge reading "This way to the Goatman". But the success of a black man was still unwelcome to many, and, in August 1938, Klansmen in the local government crossed the bridge and kidnapped Washburn from his family. They hung a noose on Old Alton Bridge and, after securing it around his neck, threw him over the side. When they looked down to see if he had died, the noose was empty. In a panic, they returned to his family home and slaughtered his wife and children.

Locals warn that if you cross the bridge at night without headlights (as the Klansmen are said to have done), you will be met on the other side by the Goatman. Ghostly figures and strange lights are said to appear in the surrounding woods, as well as reports of visitors being touched, grabbed, and having rocks thrown at them.

This legend results in the area around Old Alton Bridge being popular among paranormal investigators, such as the crews from Ghost Adventures and BuzzFeed Unsolved: Supernatural.

== Gallery ==
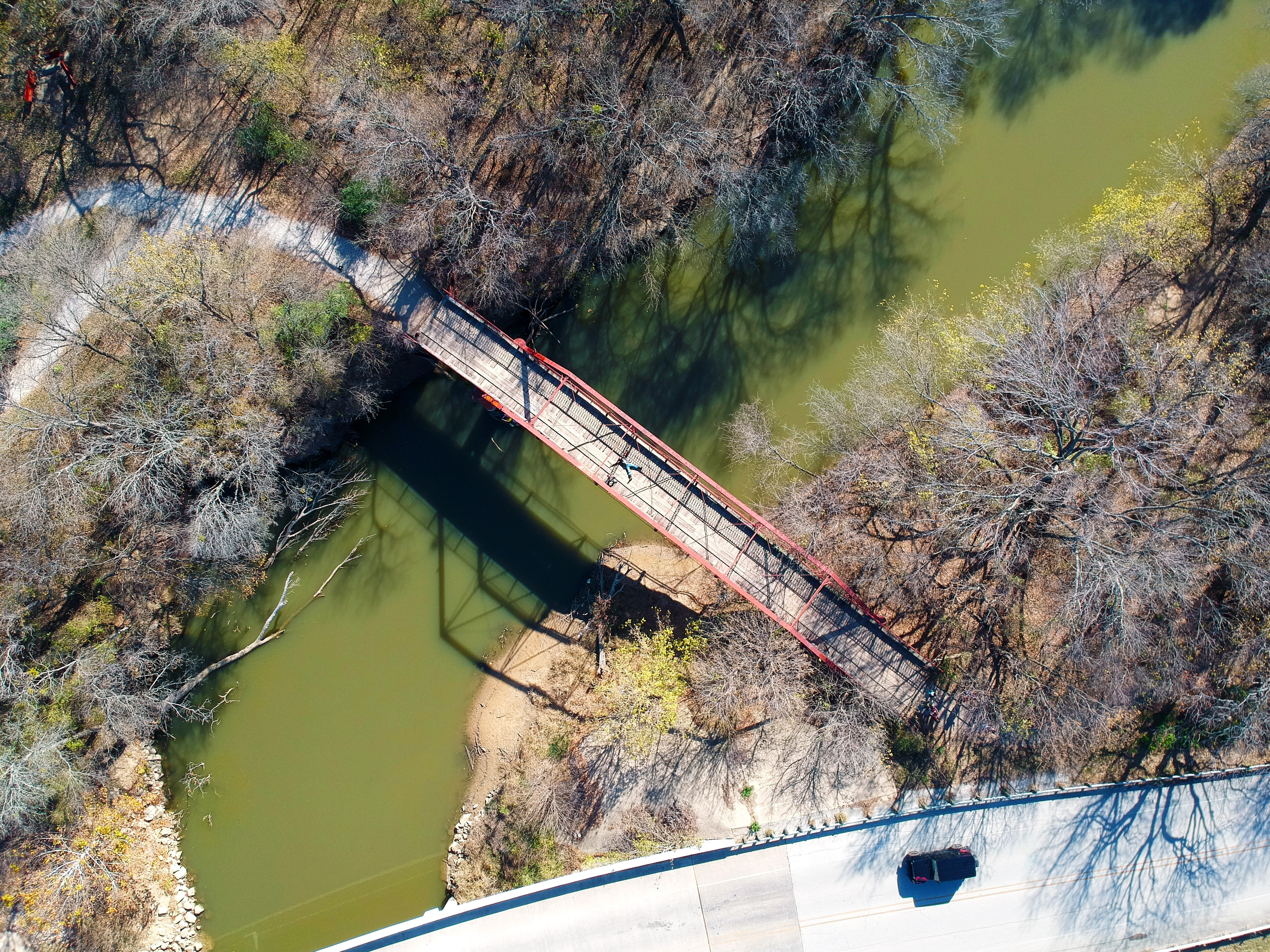

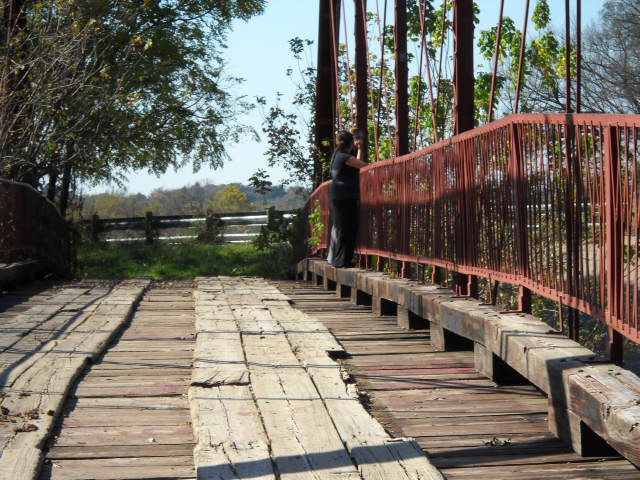

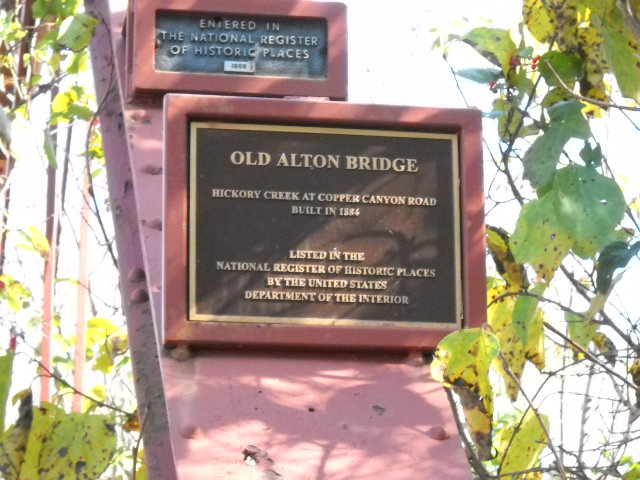

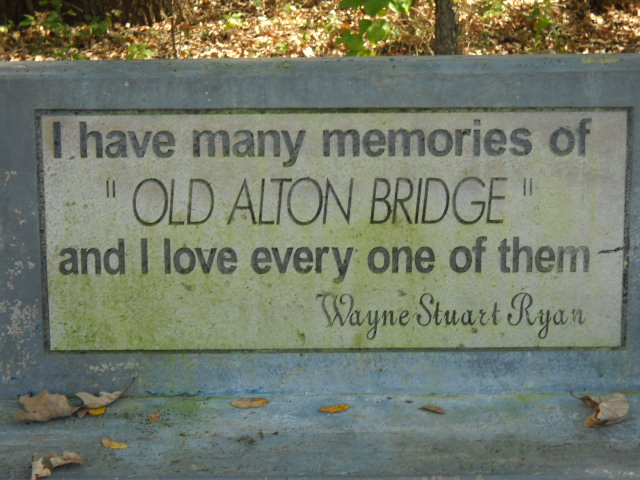

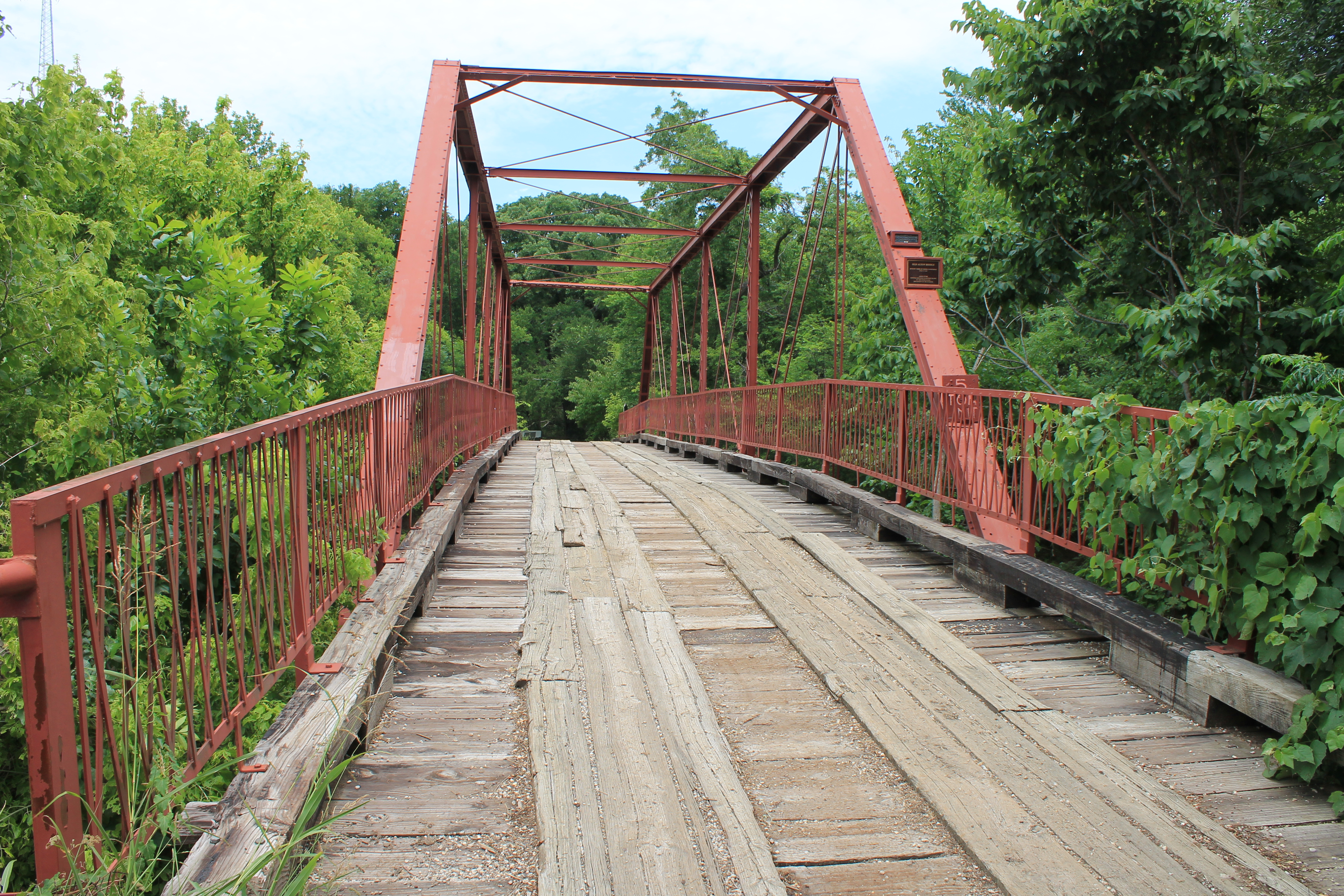

== See also ==
- National Register of Historic Places listings in Denton County, Texas
- Recorded Texas Historic Landmarks in Denton County
- List of bridges on the National Register of Historic Places in Texas
