= Denton County, Texas =

County in Texas, US

- County
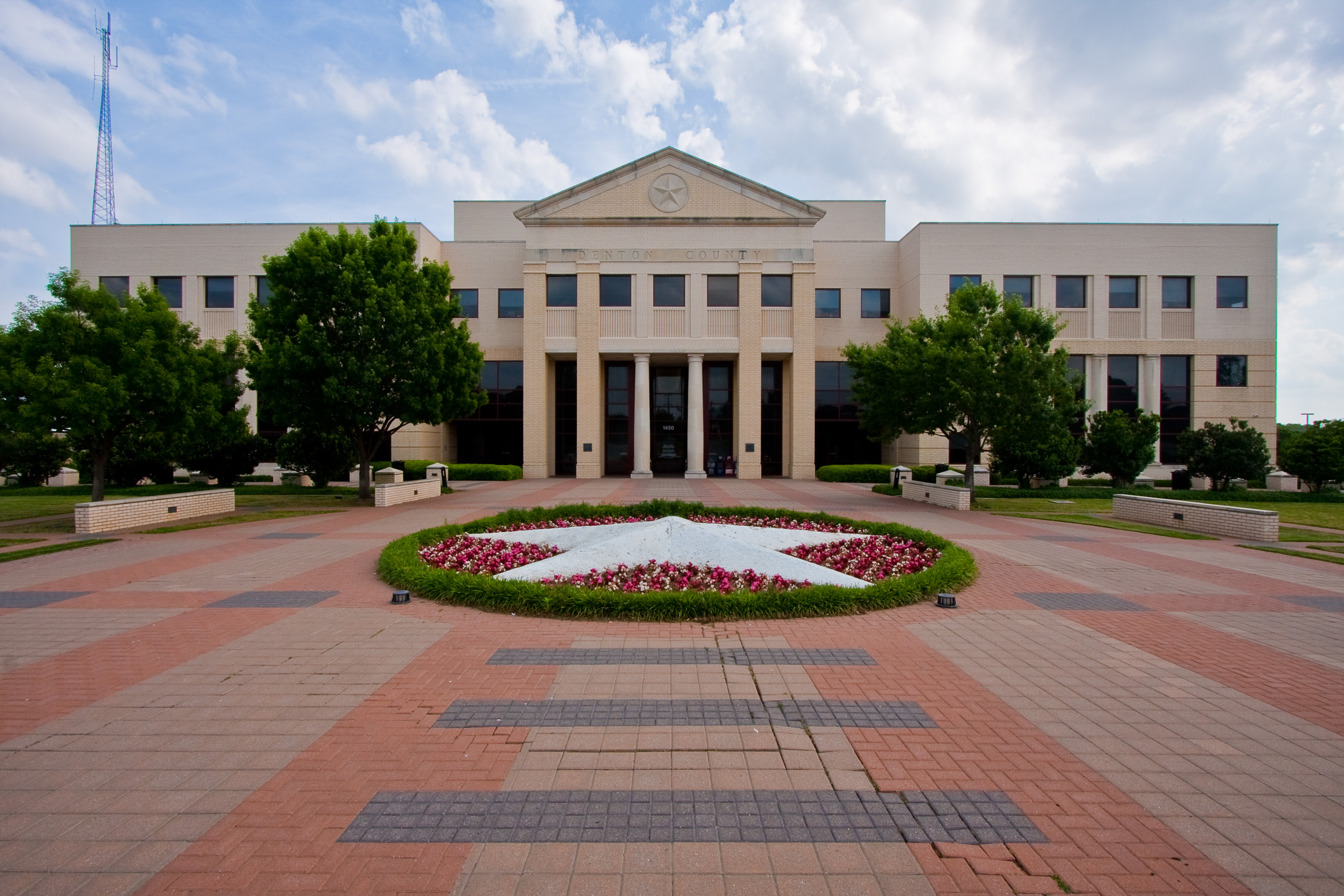
- The Denton County Courts Building, built 1998

- Flag Seal

- Location within the U.S. state of Texas
- Coordinates: 33°12′N 97°07′W
- Country: United States
- State: Texas
- Founded: April 11, 1846
- Named for: John B. Denton
- Seat: Denton
- Largest city: Denton

Area
  - Total: 953 sq mi (2,470 km^{2})
  - Land: 878 sq mi (2,270 km^{2})
  - Water: 75 sq mi (190 km^{2}) 7.8%

Population (2020)
  - Total: 906,422
  - Estimate (2025): 1,069,346 ▲
  - Density: 1,030/sq mi (399/km^{2})
- Time zone: UTC−6 (Central)
  - Summer (DST): UTC−5 (CDT)
- Congressional districts: 4th, 13th, 26th, 32nd
- Website: www.dentoncounty.gov

Denton County is a county located in the northern portion of the U.S. state of Texas. As of the 2020 census, its population was 906,422, making it the seventh-most populous county in Texas. The county seat is Denton. The county, which was named for John B. Denton, was established in 1846. Denton County constitutes part of the Dallas–Fort Worth metroplex. In 2007, it was one of the fastest-growing counties in the United States.

== History ==
Before the arrival of settlers, various Native American peoples, including the Kichai and the Lenape, infrequently populated the area. The area was settled by Peters Colony landowners in the early 1840s. Until the annexation of Texas, the area was considered part of Fannin County. On April 11, 1846, the First Texas Legislature established Denton County. The county was named for John B. Denton, who was killed while raiding a Native American village in Tarrant County in 1841. Originally, the county seat was set at Pinckneyville. This was later changed to Alton, where the Old Alton Bridge currently stands, and then moved finally to Denton.

By 1860, the population of the county had increased to 5,031. On March 4, 1861, residents of the county narrowly voted for secession from the Union, with 331 votes cast for and 264 against. The Missouri–Kansas–Texas Railroad reached Lewisville, located in the southern portion of the county, by the early 1880s. The Denton County Courthouse-on-the-Square was built in 1896, and currently houses various government offices, as well as a museum.

== Geography ==
Denton, Texas

Climate chart (precipitation, max. and min. temperature)
J	F	M	A	M	J	J	A	S	O	N	D
2.1 56 33	2.9 60 36	3.2 68 44	3.3 76 52	5.1 83 63	3.6 91 70	2.4 95 74	2.1 96 73	3.1 88 66	5 78 55	2.9 66 44	2.6 57 35
- █ Average max. and min. temperatures in °F
- █ Precipitation totals in inches
Metric conversion
J	F	M	A	M	J	J	A	S	O	N	D
52 13 1	74 16 2	82 20 7	83 24 11	130 28 17	91 33 21	61 35 23	54 36 23	78 31 19	126 26 13	74 19 7	65 14 2
- █ Average max. and min. temperatures in °C
- █ Precipitation totals in mm

According to the U.S. Census Bureau, the county has a total area of 953 square miles (2,470 km^{2}), of which 878 square miles (2,270 km^{2}) are land and 75 square miles (190 km^{2}) (7.8%) are covered by water. Denton County is located in the northern part of the Dallas–Fort Worth metroplex, about 35 miles south of the border between Texas and Oklahoma. It is drained by two forks of the Trinity River. The largest body of water in Denton County is Lewisville Lake, which was formed in 1954 when the Garza–Little Elm Reservoir was merged with Lake Dallas. The county is on the western edge of the eastern Cross Timbers and also encompasses parts of the Grand Prairie portion of the Texas blackland prairies. Portions of Denton County sit atop the Barnett Shale, a geological formation believed to contain large quantities of natural shale gas. Between 1995 and 2007, the number of natural gas wells in the county increased from 156 to 1,820, which has led to some controversy over the pollution associated with hydraulic fracturing.

=== Lakes ===
- Lewisville Lake
- Lake Ray Roberts

=== Adjacent counties ===
- Cooke County (north)
- Grayson County (northeast)
- Collin County (east)
- Dallas County (southeast)
- Tarrant County (south)
- Wise County (west)

== Communities ==
=== Cities ===
==== Multiple counties ====
- Carrollton (partly in Dallas County and a small part in Collin County)
- Celina (mostly in Collin County)
- Coppell (mostly in Dallas County)
- Dallas (mostly in Dallas County with small parts in Collin, Kaufman, Rockwall and Denton counties)
- Fort Worth (mostly in Tarrant County with small parts in Johnson, Parker, Wise, and Denton counties)
- Frisco (mostly in Collin County)
- Grapevine (mostly in Tarrant County and a small part in Dallas and Denton counties)
- Haslet (mostly in Tarrant County)
- Lewisville (small part in Dallas County)
- Plano (mostly in Collin County)
- Southlake (mostly in Tarrant County)

==== Denton County only ====
- Aubrey
- Corinth
- Denton (county seat)
- Highland Village
- Justin
- Krugerville
- Krum
- Lake Dallas
- Lakewood Village
- Little Elm
- Oak Point
- Pilot Point
- Roanoke
- Sanger
- The Colony

=== Towns ===
==== Multiple counties ====
- Flower Mound (small part in Tarrant County)
- Hebron (small part in Collin County)
- Prosper (mostly in Collin County)
- Trophy Club (small part in Tarrant County)
- Westlake (mostly in Tarrant County)

==== Denton County only ====
- Argyle
- Bartonville
- Corral City
- Copper Canyon
- Cross Roads
- DISH
- Double Oak
- Hackberry
- Hickory Creek
- Lincoln Park
- Northlake
- Ponder
- Providence Village
- Shady Shores

=== Census-designated places ===
- Lantana
- Paloma Creek
- Paloma Creek South
- Savannah

=== Unincorporated communities ===
- Alliance (partly in Tarrant County)
- Bolivar
- Navo

=== Ghost towns ===
- Alton
- Camey Spur
- Cooper Creek
- Drop
- Elizabethtown
- Green Valley
- Marshall Creek
- Mayhill
- Mingo
- Mustang
- Parvin
- Plainview
- Stony

== Demographics ==
Historical population
Census	Pop.	Note	%±
1850	641		—
1860	5,031		684.9%
1870	7,251		44.1%
1880	18,143		150.2%
1890	21,289		17.3%
1900	28,318		33.0%
1910	31,258		10.4%
1920	35,355		13.1%
1930	32,822		−7.2%
1940	33,658		2.5%
1950	41,365		22.9%
1960	47,432		14.7%
1970	75,633		59.5%
1980	143,126		89.2%
1990	273,525		91.1%
2000	432,976		58.3%
2010	662,614		53.0%
2020	906,422		36.8%
2025 (est.)	1,069,346	▲	18.0%

=== Racial and ethnic composition ===
Denton County, Texas – Racial and ethnic composition Note: the US Census treats Hispanic/Latino as an ethnic category. This table excludes Latinos from the racial categories and assigns them to a separate category. Hispanics/Latinos may be of any race.
Race / Ethnicity (NH = Non-Hispanic)	Pop 1980	Pop 1990	Pop 2000	Pop 2010	Pop 2020	% 1980	% 1990	% 2000	% 2010	% 2020
White alone (NH)	127,730	232,885	328,849	426,887	485,646	89.24%	85.14%	75.95%	64.42%	53.58%
Black or African American alone (NH)	6,128	13,314	24,980	54,034	95,386	4.28%	4.87%	5.77%	8.15%	10.52%
Native American or Alaska Native alone (NH)	586	1,326	2,093	3,143	3,582	0.41%	0.48%	0.48%	0.47%	0.40%
Asian alone (NH)	1,507	6,753	17,327	43,091	92,751	1.05%	2.47%	4.00%	6.50%	10.23%
Native Hawaiian or Pacific Islander alone (NH)	x	x	186	411	650	x	x	0.04%	0.06%	0.07%
Other race alone (NH)	773	234	559	1,176	3,909	0.54%	0.09%	0.13%	0.18%	0.43%
Mixed race or Multiracial (NH)	x	x	6,363	13,036	41,720	x	x	1.47%	1.97%	4.60%
Hispanic or Latino (any race)	6,402	19,013	52,619	120,836	182,778	4.47%	6.95%	12.15%	18.24%	20.16%
Total	143,126	273,525	432,976	662,614	906,422	100.00%	100.00%	100.00%	100.00%	100.00%

=== American Community Survey 2025 data ===
The United States Census Bureau estimated that in 2025, Denton County’s population was 1.069.346. It was also estimated that the county's population was 48,51% Non-Hispanic White, 21,22% Hispanic or Latino, 11,48% Non-Hispanic Black, 14,54% Asian, 0,37% Native American, 0,09% Pacific Islander, and 3,79% Multiracial.

Total	Population	Percentage
Non-Hispanic White	518.692	48,51%
Hispanic or Latino	226.920	21,22%
Non-Hispanic Black	122.783	11,48%
Asian	155.510	14,54%
Native American	3.922	0,37%
Pacific Islander	975	0,09%
Non-Hispanic Multiracial	40.544	3,79%

=== 2020 census ===
As of the 2020 census, the county had a population of 906,422, a median age of 35.4 years, with 25.2% of residents under the age of 18 and 10.7% aged 65 years or older. For every 100 females there were 95.6 males, and for every 100 females age 18 and over there were 93.0 males age 18 and over. This count represented continued population growth among suburban communities outside Dallas and Fort Worth, and Denton County ranked 29th on the U.S. Census Bureau's list of fastest-growing counties between 2000 and 2007, with a 41.4% increase in population.

The racial makeup of the county was 58.1% White, 10.8% Black or African American, 0.8% American Indian and Alaska Native, 10.3% Asian, 0.1% Native Hawaiian and Pacific Islander, 7.1% from some other race, and 12.8% from two or more races. Hispanic or Latino residents of any race comprised 20.2% of the population. The composition reflected state and national demographic trends of greater diversification.

92.8% of residents lived in urban areas, while 7.2% lived in rural areas.

There were 328,884 households in the county, of which 37.6% had children under the age of 18 living in them. Of all households, 55.1% were married-couple households, 15.9% were households with a male householder and no spouse or partner present, and 23.1% were households with a female householder and no spouse or partner present. About 22.2% of all households were made up of individuals and 5.8% had someone living alone who was 65 years of age or older.

There were 348,275 housing units, of which 5.6% were vacant. Among occupied housing units, 63.0% were owner-occupied and 37.0% were renter-occupied. The homeowner vacancy rate was 1.5% and the rental vacancy rate was 8.4%.

=== 2010 census ===
According to the 2010 United States census, there were 662,614 people, 224,840 households and 256,139 housing units in the county. The population density was 754.3 people per square mile (291.2 people/km^{2}).

In 2010, the racial makeup of the county was 75% White, 8.4% African American, 0.7% Native American, 6.6% Asian, and 3.0% from two or more races. About 18.2% of the population was Hispanic or Latino of any race.

A Williams Institute analysis of 2010 census data found about 5.2 same-sex couples per 1,000 households in the county.

== Government and politics ==
=== Government ===
Denton County, like all counties in Texas, is governed by a commissioner's court, which consists of the county judge (the chairperson of the court), who is elected county-wide, and four commissioners who are elected by the voters in each of four districts.

Justices of the peace are county officials with jurisdiction over landlord/tenant issues, small civil claims, certain misdemeanors involving fines only (no jail time), and other matters.

==== County judge and commissioners ====
Office	Name	Party
County judge	Andy Eads	Republican
Commissioner, Precinct 1	Ryan Williams	Republican
Commissioner, Precinct 2	Kevin Falconer	Republican
Commissioner, Precinct 3	Bobbie Mitchell	Republican
Commissioner, Precinct 4	Dianne Edmondson	Republican

==== County officials ====
Office	Name	Party
District attorney	Paul Johnson	Republican
County clerk	Juli Luke	Republican
District clerk	David Trantham	Republican
Sheriff	Tracy Murphree	Republican
Tax assessor	Michelle French	Republican
Treasurer	Cindy Yeatts Brown	Republican

==== Justices of the peace ====
Office	Name	Party
Precinct 1	Alan Wheeler	Republican
Precinct 2	James R. DePiazza	Republican
Precinct 3	James Kerbow	Republican
Precinct 4	Harris Hughey	Republican
Precinct 5	Mike Oglesby	Republican
Precinct 6	Blanca Oliver	Republican

==== Law enforcement ====
The Denton Sheriff's Office employs more than 600 people, for the Denton County Sheriff's Office, most in the Detention Bureau. The office operates a county jail that houses up to 1,400 prisoners. The office is co-located with the jail at 127 North Woodrow Lane in the city of Denton.

As of 2021, the current sheriff is Tracy Murphree, who was first elected in 2016. That election was particularly contentious, with previous sheriff William B. Travis dogged by scandal, and new candidate Murphree making headlines for saying he would beat up a man who entered a women's public bathroom his daughter was using.

=== Politics ===
Denton County, like most suburban counties in Texas, had reliably supported the Republican Party in most statewide and national elections, although it has become more competitive in recent years; in 2018 Democratic candidate Beto O'Rourke earned 45.52% of the county's votes and two Democrats were elected. The last Democratic presidential candidate to win the county was native Texan Lyndon B. Johnson in 1964, the only time since 1952 that the county has been carried by a Democrat. Denton swung rapidly into the Republican column at the federal level in the 1950s and 1960s as Dallas and Fort Worth's suburbs spilled into the county.

In 2018, former State Representative Michelle Beckley became the first Democrat elected to the state legislature from Denton County since 1984. Her district at the time, the former 65th, was located entirely within Denton County, and included significant portions of Carrollton, Highland Village and Lewisville. Beckley stepped down from the seat in 2022 to run for Lieutenant Governor, and ultimately it was won back by the Republican nominee. Also in 2018, Christopher Lopez was elected to Justice of the Peace, Precinct 6, and became the first Democrat elected at the county level since 2004; Lopez held the JP6 position until a Republican challenger unseated him in 2022.

In 2020, Republican Donald Trump carried the county with 53.3% of the vote, Democratic candidate Joe Biden won 45.2% of the vote share, the best result for a Democrat in the county since 1976.

In 2024, Trump carried Denton County by a smaller margin than he had in 2016. This marked the first time since 1972 that Denton County voted to the left of Texas as a whole.

In the 2026 U.S. Senate election, Democratic candidate James Talarico carried the county by a sizable 8% margin over Republican Ken Paxton. This was the first time Denton County voted for a statewide Democrat in the 21st century.

United States presidential election results for Denton County, Texas
Year	Republican		Democratic		Third party(ies)	
Year	No.	%	No.	%	No.	%
1912	189	7.25%	2,287	87.76%	130	4.99%
1916	451	13.03%	2,844	82.15%	167	4.82%
1920	900	34.62%	1,257	48.35%	443	17.04%
1924	712	12.27%	4,708	81.10%	385	6.63%
1928	2,587	51.89%	2,384	47.81%	15	0.30%
1932	520	9.16%	5,115	90.10%	42	0.74%
1936	476	8.62%	5,021	90.91%	26	0.47%
1940	899	12.33%	6,386	87.58%	7	0.10%
1944	771	10.84%	5,584	78.54%	755	10.62%
1948	1,531	22.02%	4,549	65.42%	873	12.56%
1952	5,840	52.44%	5,289	47.49%	8	0.07%
1956	5,350	51.71%	4,972	48.06%	24	0.23%
1960	5,724	51.48%	5,366	48.26%	29	0.26%
1964	4,335	32.13%	9,137	67.71%	22	0.16%
1968	8,222	43.59%	7,463	39.56%	3,178	16.85%
1972	19,138	66.18%	9,720	33.61%	62	0.21%
1976	20,440	51.50%	18,887	47.58%	365	0.92%
1980	29,908	59.93%	17,381	34.83%	2,619	5.25%
1984	52,865	75.74%	16,772	24.03%	159	0.23%
1988	57,444	68.22%	26,204	31.12%	562	0.67%
1992	48,492	41.60%	27,891	23.93%	40,193	34.48%
1996	65,313	58.53%	36,138	32.38%	10,145	9.09%
2000	102,171	69.60%	40,144	27.35%	4,475	3.05%
2004	140,891	69.95%	59,346	29.47%	1,173	0.58%
2008	149,935	61.63%	91,160	37.47%	2,168	0.89%
2012	157,579	64.91%	80,978	33.35%	4,224	1.74%
2016	170,603	57.13%	110,890	37.13%	17,152	5.74%
2020	222,480	53.23%	188,695	45.15%	6,789	1.62%
2024	250,521	55.77%	191,503	42.63%	7,164	1.59%

United States Senate election results for Denton County, Texas1
Year	Republican		Democratic		Third party(ies)	
Year	No.	%	No.	%	No.	%
2006	74,977	69.64%	30,198	28.05%	2,495	2.32%
2012	154,208	64.17%	77,314	32.17%	8,805	3.66%
2018	158,744	53.67%	134,649	45.52%	2,409	0.81%
2024	237,978	53.07%	200,676	44.75%	9,805	2.19%

United States Senate election results for Denton County, Texas2
Year	Republican		Democratic		Third party(ies)	
Year	No.	%	No.	%	No.	%
2002	50,888	66.56%	25,156	32.90%	413	0.54%
2008	81,939	69.06%	30,198	25.45%	6,511	5.49%
2014	96,561	67.68%	39,488	27.68%	6,634	4.65%
2020	231,025	55.91%	170,984	41.38%	11,202	2.71%
2026	177,859	44.89%	211,266	53.32%	7,110	1.79%

Texas Gubernatorial election results for Denton County
Year	Republican		Democratic		Third party(ies)	
Year	No.	%	No.	%	No.	%
2002	28,591	72.34%	10,167	25.73%	763	1.93%
2006	83,726	52.57%	43,073	27.04%	32,469	20.39%
2010	83,726	63.84%	43,073	32.84%	4,344	3.31%
2014	93,683	65.05%	47,238	32.80%	3,089	2.14%
2018	174,472	59.25%	113,808	38.65%	6,194	2.10%
2022	177,017	55.70%	136,389	42.92%	4,375	1.38%
2026	191,413	48.19%	199,625	50.26%	6,159	1.55%

==== United States representatives ====
District	Name	Party	Residence
4th congressional district	Pat Fallon	Republican	Sherman
13th congressional district	Ronny Jackson	Republican	Amarillo
26th congressional district	Brandon Gill	Republican	Flower Mound
32nd congressional district	Julie Johnson	Democrat	Farmers Branch

==== Texas state representatives ====
District	Name	Party	Residence
District 57	Richard Hayes	Republican	Denton
District 63	Ben Bumgarner	Republican	Flower Mound
District 64	Andy Hopper	Republican	Decatur
District 65	Mitch Little	Republican	Lewisville
District 106	Jared Patterson	Republican	Frisco

==== Texas state senators ====
District	Name	Party	Residence
District 12	Tan Parker	Republican	Flower Mound
District 30	Brent Hagenbuch	Republican	Denton

==== State Board of Education members ====
District	Name	Party	Residence
District 12	Pam Little	Republican	Fairview
District 14	Evelyn Brooks	Republican	Frisco

== Education ==
=== K-12 schools ===
These school districts lie entirely within Denton County:

- Argyle Independent School District
- Aubrey Independent School District
- Denton Independent School District
- Lake Dallas Independent School District
- Lewisville Independent School District
- Little Elm Independent School District
- Ponder Independent School District
- Sanger Independent School District

These school districts lie partly within Denton County:

- Carrollton-Farmers Branch Independent School District
- Celina Independent School District
- Era Independent School District
- Frisco Independent School District
- Krum Independent School District
- Northwest Independent School District
- Pilot Point Independent School District
- Prosper Independent School District
- Slidell Independent School District

These private educational institutions serve Denton County:

- Denton Calvary Academy
- Coram Deo Academy
- Lakeland Christian Academy
- Liberty Christian School
- Selwyn College Preparatory School

From around 1997 to 2015, the number of non-Hispanic white children in K-12 schools in the county increased by 20,000 as part of a trend of white flight and suburbanization by non-Hispanic white families.

=== Colleges and universities ===
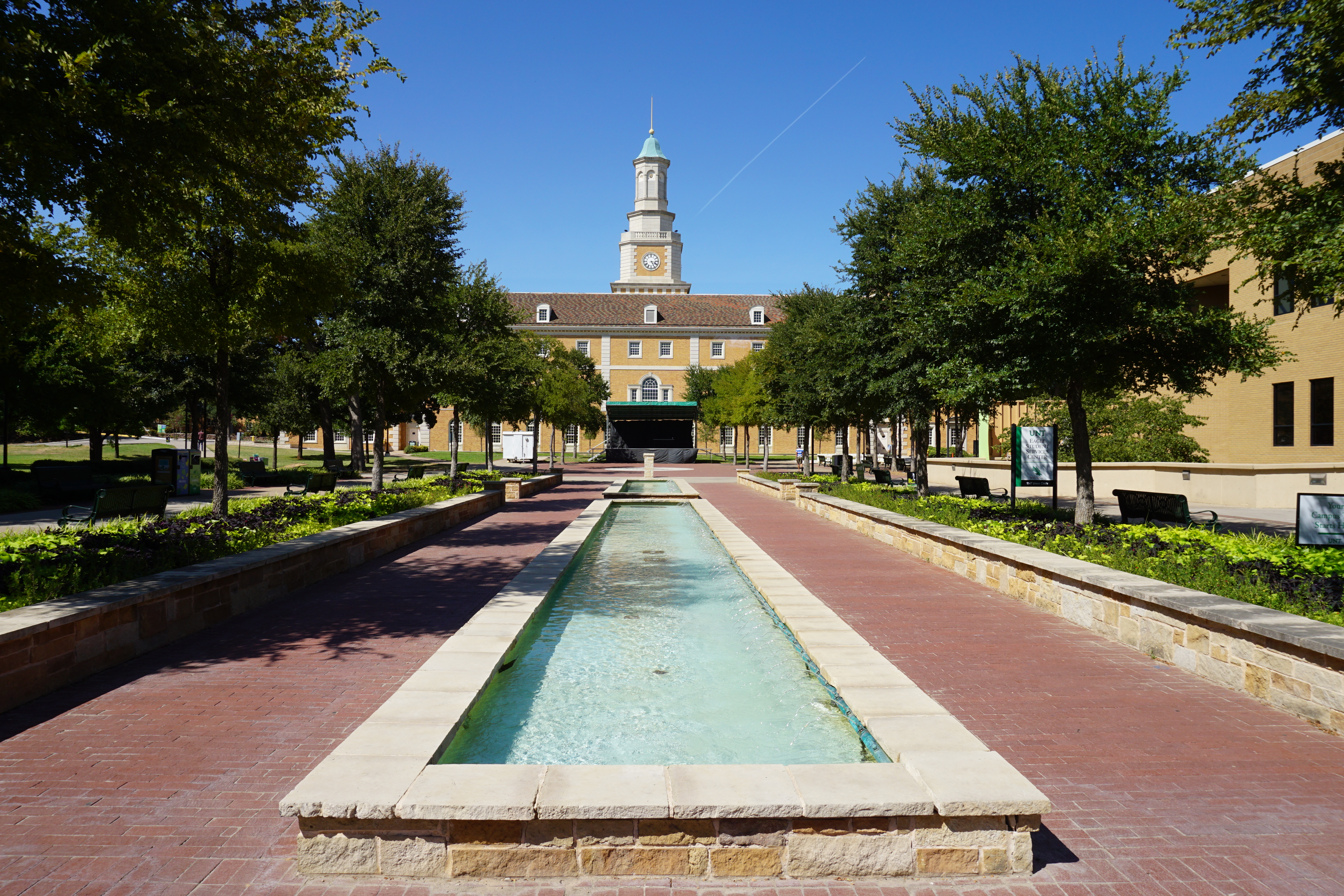
Hurley Administration Building of UNT.

According to the Texas Education Code, most of Denton County is assigned to North Central Texas College for community college. However, portions within Celina ISD, Prosper ISD, and the municipalities of Frisco and The Colony are instead assigned to Collin College (formerly Collin County Community College), and portions zoned to Carrollton-Farmers Branch ISD are assigned to Dallas College (formerly Dallas County Community College District).

These four year higher-education institutions serve Denton County:

- University of North Texas (UNT)
- Texas Woman's University

== Transportation ==
The Denton County Transportation Authority (DCTA) operates fixed-route bus services, on-demand GoZone service, and ACCESS paratransit service in the county that includes Denton, Lewisville, and Highland Village. SPAN Transit covers areas outside of Denton and Lewisville.

DCTA also operates the A-train, a commuter rail service that runs from Denton to Carrollton, at which station passengers can switch to the Green Line train owned and operated by Dallas Area Rapid Transit (DART). Passengers can transfer to other DART lines (denominated by different colors) at the downtown Dallas DART station.

The county is home to the Denton Municipal Airport and the Northwest Regional Airport in Roanoke. Dallas/Fort Worth International Airport is located a few miles south of the county.

=== Major highways ===
- I-35
  - I-35 BL (Sanger)
- I-35E
- I-35W
- US 77
- US 377
- US 380
- SH 114
- SH 121 / Sam Rayburn Tollway
- SH 170
- SH 190 / Pres. George Bush Turnpike
- Loop 118
- Loop 288
- Spur 51
- Dallas North Tollway (partly straddling the eastern Denton County border)

== Notable people ==
- Dick Armey, former U.S. House Majority Leader and a chief architect of the Contract with America.
- Joan Blondell, film and television actress, attended UNT (then North Texas State Teacher's College) in 1926–1927.
- Pat Boone, American pop singer, briefly attended UNT.
- Bowling for Soup, American rock band, based in Denton since 1996 and mentioned the county in their song Ohio (Come Back to Texas)
- Terry Bradshaw, former Pittsburgh Steelers quarterback
- Mason Cox, professional Australian rules footballer, playing for Collingwood in the AFL
- Phyllis George, 1971 Miss America, sportscaster and former First Lady of Kentucky
- Joe Greene, defensive tackle for the Pittsburgh Steelers, 1969–1981; 1969 defensive rookie of the year; 1972 and 1974 defensive player of the year; NFL 1970s all-decade team; Hall of Fame
- Jim Hightower, former Texas Agriculture Commissioner
- Norah Jones, UNT jazz major
- Henry Lee Lucas, serial killer, known as the "Confession Killer", committed a 1982 murder in Denton that ultimately led to his arrest
- Meat Loaf, American singer and actor, attended UNT
- Gordon McLendon, radio broadcaster and pioneer, B-movie producer, and conservative political financier
- Laina Morris - the Overly Attached Girlfriend
- Bill Moyers, White House press secretary in the Johnson Administration (1965–67), attended UNT
- Anne Rice, author, attended TWU and UNT, married in Denton
- Ann Sheridan, the "Oomph Girl", popular actress and singer, born and raised in Denton
- Sly Stone, the musician and frontman of Sly and the Family Stone
- Rex Tillerson, former CEO of ExxonMobil and 69th United States Secretary of State, resident of Bartonville
- Von Erich family, multigenerational professional wrestling family, known for a series of premature deaths sometimes referred to as the Von Erich curse
- Tex Watson, central member of the "Manson family" and leader of the Tate-LaBianca murders in August 1969.

== See also ==
- Denton County Sheriff's Office (Texas)
- Denton County Times
- List of museums in North Texas
- National Register of Historic Places listings in Denton County, Texas
- Recorded Texas Historic Landmarks in Denton County
