= Selwyn College Preparatory School =

Selwyn School

Location
- 2270 Copper Canyon Road; Argyle, Texas 76226; United States; 33.120459°N 97.1100392°W

Information
- Type: Private high school
- Principal: Deborah Hof
- Faculty: 32
- Grades: PreK-12
- Enrollment: 133 (2013-2014)
- Color
- Team name: Unicorns
- Website: Official Website

The Selwyn College Preparatory School is a school in Argyle, Texas. On January 21, 2012, the school's main building along with the kindergarten-5th grade classroom building burnt to the ground.

In 2016, Selwyn relocated to Argyle, Texas.

== See also ==
- University-preparatory school
