= Ponder, Texas =

- Town
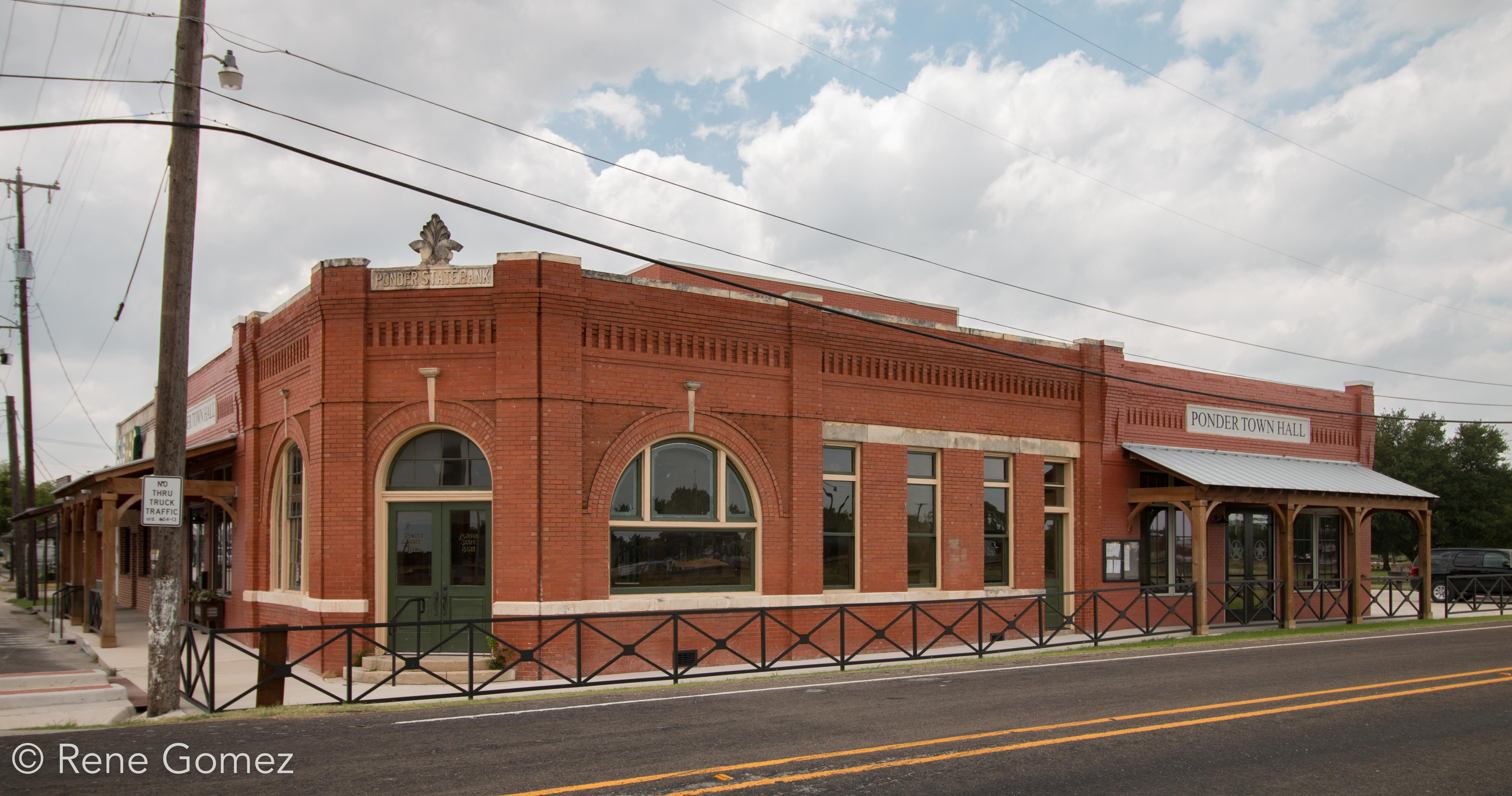
- Ponder State Bank

- Location of Ponder in Denton County, Texas
- Coordinates: 33°10′42″N 97°17′28″W
- Country: United States
- State: Texas
- County: Denton

Area
  - Total: 3.39 sq mi (8.77 km^{2})
  - Land: 3.38 sq mi (8.76 km^{2})
  - Water: 0.0039 sq mi (0.01 km^{2})
- Elevation: 728 ft (222 m)

Population (2020)
  - Total: 2,442
- Time zone: UTC-6 (Central (CST))
  - Summer (DST): UTC-5 (CDT)
- ZIP code: 76259
- Area code: 940
- FIPS code: 48-58664
- GNIS feature ID: 2412496
- Website: https://www.pondertx.com/

Ponder is a town in Denton County, Texas, United States. The population was 2,442 in 2020.

== History ==
The community has the name of the local Ponder family.

Local legend holds that Bonnie and Clyde either robbed the Ponder State Bank or attempted to rob it, only to discover it had gone broke the week before. However, this is not listed in the Barrow Gang's activities. The robbery in question may have been committed by the less famous but more successful Eddie Bentz.

== Geography ==
According to the United States Census Bureau, the town has a total area of 3.2 square miles (8.3 km^{2}), all land.

== Demographics ==
Historical population
Census	Pop.	Note	%±
1970	208		—
1980	297		42.8%
1990	432		45.5%
2000	507		17.4%
2010	1,395		175.1%
2020	2,442		75.1%
2023 (est.)	2,757	▲	12.9%
U.S. Decennial Census

Ponder racial composition as of 2020 (NH = Non-Hispanic) (Note: Note: the US Census treats Hispanic/Latino as an ethnic category. This table excludes Latinos from the racial categories and assigns them to a separate category. Hispanics/Latinos can be of any race.)
Race	Number	Percentage
White (NH)	1,749	71.62%
Black or African American (NH)	83	3.4%
Native American or Alaska Native (NH)	15	0.61%
Asian (NH)	29	1.19%
Pacific Islander (NH)	1	0.04%
Some Other Race (NH)	8	0.33%
Mixed/Multi-Racial (NH)	134	5.49%
Hispanic or Latino	423	17.32%
Total	2,442	

As of the 2020 United States census, there were 2,442 people, 798 households, and 600 families residing in the town.

== Education ==
Ponder is served by the Ponder Independent School District, which operates Ponder High School.

== Notable person ==
- Joe McQueen (1919–2019), jazz musician, born in Ponder

== Photo gallery ==
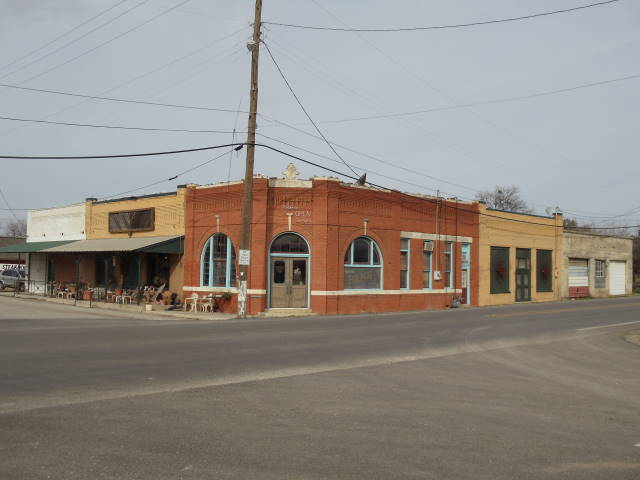
Downtown Ponder, Texas

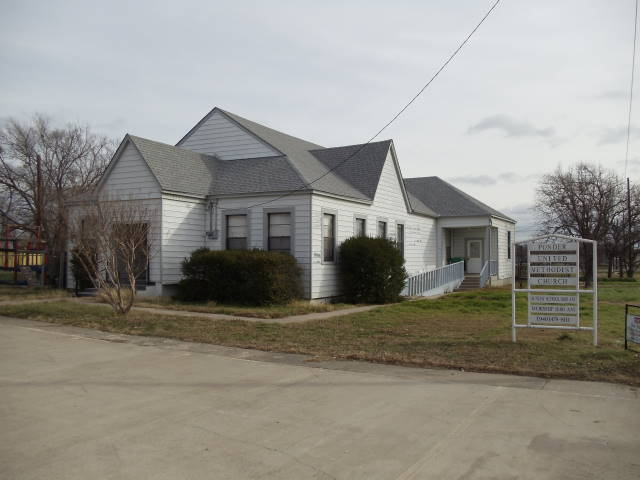
Former site of the Ponder United Methodist Church. The church moved to another building at 104 Remington Park Ln., next to the neighborhood of Remington Park.

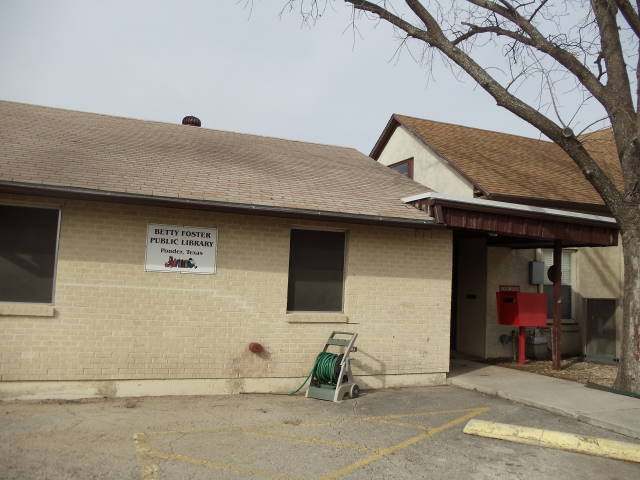
Ponder Public Library and Town Hall.

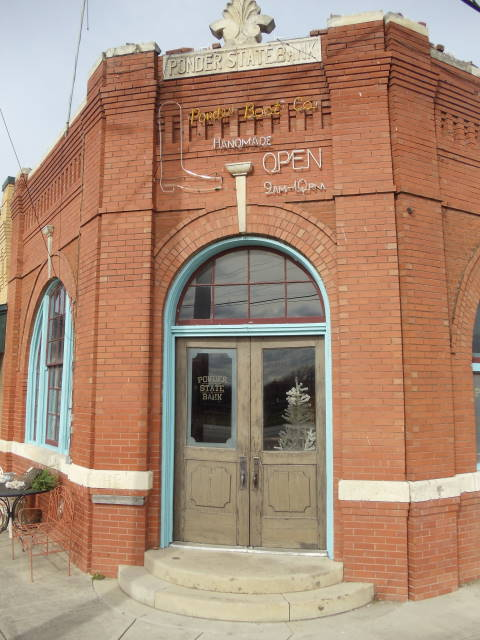
Ponder State Bank, the site of the alleged robbing by Bonnie and Clyde.
