= Krum, Texas =

- City
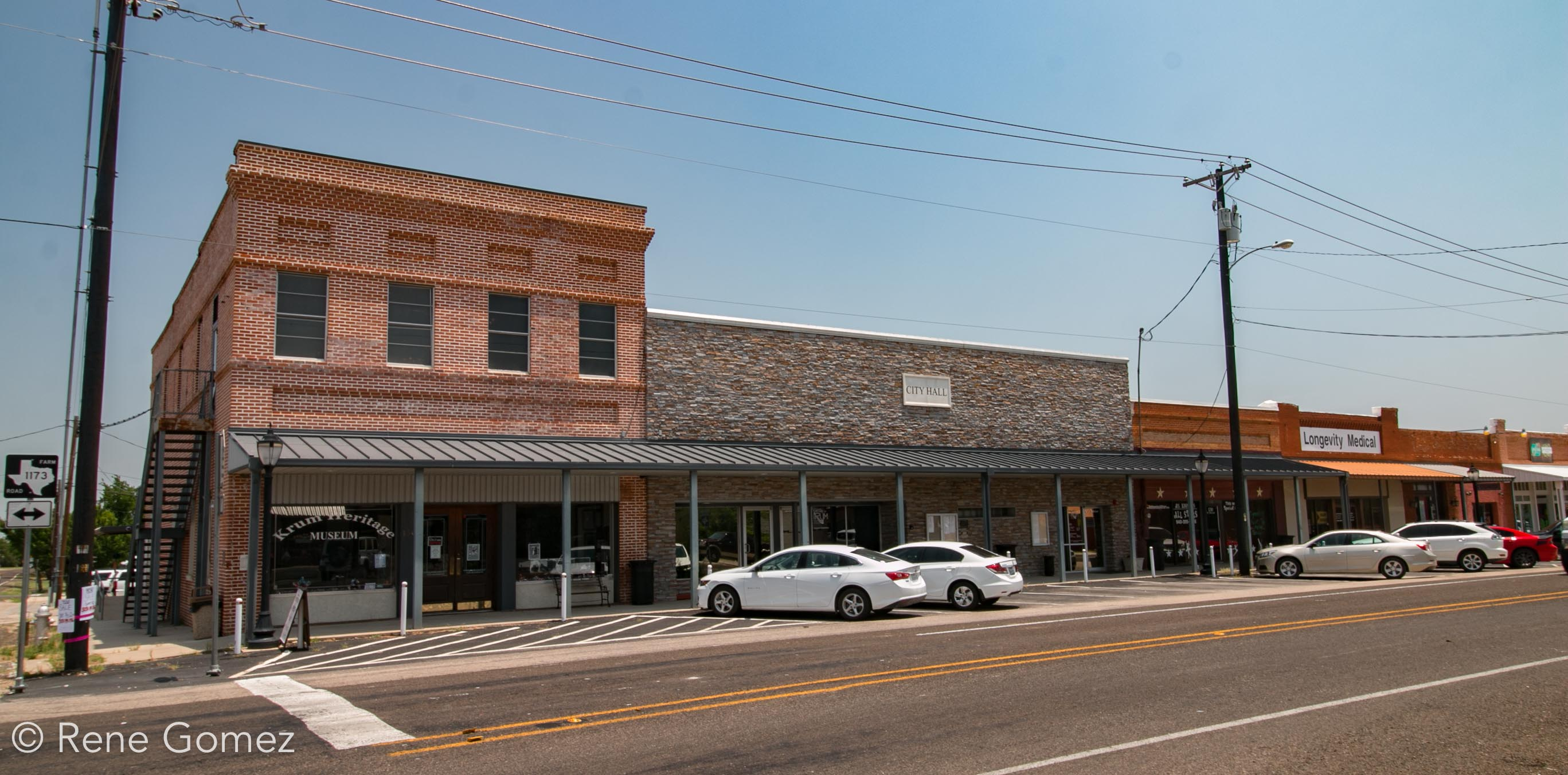
- Motto: Building a bright future on a proud past
- Location of Krum in Denton County, Texas
- Coordinates: 33°15′26″N 97°13′50″W
- Country: United States
- State: Texas
- County: Denton

Area
  - Total: 2.58 sq mi (6.68 km^{2})
  - Land: 2.58 sq mi (6.67 km^{2})
  - Water: 0.0039 sq mi (0.01 km^{2})
- Elevation: 722 ft (220 m)

Population (2020)
  - Total: 5,483
  - Density: 1,948.2/sq mi (752.19/km^{2})
- Time zone: UTC-6 (Central (CST))
  - Summer (DST): UTC-5 (CDT)
- ZIP code: 76249
- Area code: 940
- FIPS code: 48-39928
- GNIS feature ID: 2411562
- Website: cityofkrum.com

Krum is a city in Denton County, Texas, United States. The population was 4,157 at the 2010 census, more than doubling its 2000 census population of 1,984. By 2020, its population was 5,483.

== Geography ==
According to the United States Census Bureau, the city has a total area of 2.5 square miles (6.4 km^{2}), all land.

== Demographics ==
Historical population
Census	Pop.	Note	%±
1960	317		—
1970	454		43.2%
1980	917		102.0%
1990	1,542		68.2%
2000	1,979		28.3%
2010	4,157		110.1%
2020	5,483		31.9%
2023 (est.)	6,548		19.4%
U.S. Decennial Census

=== 2020 census ===
As of the 2020 census, there were 5,483 people, 1,844 households, and 1,216 families residing in the city. The median age was 34.2 years. 28.8% of residents were under the age of 18 and 10.0% of residents were 65 years of age or older. For every 100 females there were 93.9 males, and for every 100 females age 18 and over there were 89.5 males age 18 and over.

99.2% of residents lived in urban areas, while 0.8% lived in rural areas.

There were 1,844 households in Krum, of which 46.1% had children under the age of 18 living in them. Of all households, 59.5% were married-couple households, 12.7% were households with a male householder and no spouse or partner present, and 20.6% were households with a female householder and no spouse or partner present. About 15.7% of all households were made up of individuals and 6.1% had someone living alone who was 65 years of age or older.

There were 1,935 housing units, of which 4.7% were vacant. The homeowner vacancy rate was 1.5% and the rental vacancy rate was 7.2%.

Racial composition as of the 2020 census
Race	Number	Percent
White	4,246	77.4%
Black or African American	144	2.6%
American Indian and Alaska Native	51	0.9%
Asian	51	0.9%
Native Hawaiian and Other Pacific Islander	4	0.1%
Some other race	274	5.0%
Two or more races	713	13.0%
Hispanic or Latino (of any race)	1,006	18.3%

== Education ==
Krum is served by the Krum Independent School District.

== Notable people ==
- The Quebe Sisters violin and vocal stars: Grace, Hulda and Sophia Quebe grew up in Krum.

== Bibliography ==
- Della Isbell Davis, Krum, Texas the Story of a Small Town (originally published in 1976).
- Kathleen E. and Clifton R. St. Clair, eds., Little Towns of Texas (Jacksonville, Texas: Jayroe Graphic Arts, 1982).
