= Lantana, Texas =

- Master-planned community
- Location within the state of Texas Lantana (the United States)
- Coordinates: 33°4′57″N 97°7′15″W
- Country: United States
- State: Texas
- County: Denton
- Established: 2001

Area
  - Total: 2.4 sq mi (6.3 km^{2})
  - Land: 2.4 sq mi (6.3 km^{2})
  - Water: 0 sq mi (0.0 km^{2})

Population (2020)
  - Total: 12,583
  - Density: 5,200/sq mi (2,000/km^{2})
- Time zone: UTC-6 (Central (CST))
  - Summer (DST): UTC-5 (CDT)
- ZIP codes: 76226
- Area code: 940
- Website: Lantana, TX

Lantana is an affluent, upscale census-designated place (CDP) and planned community originally developed by Republic Property Group, 8 miles (13 km) south of Denton in unincorporated Denton County, Texas, United States. As of the 2020 census, Lantana had a population of 10,785. Lantana shares the 76226 ZIP code of Argyle. Approximately one quarter of the populace have an annual household income of greater than $150,000, with 34% having incomes from $75,000-$150,000. Almost half of the Lantana population has a bachelor's degree or higher. In 2004, 2006, 2011 and 2012, Lantana won the People's Choice Award for Community of the Year at the Dallas Homebuilders Association McSAM Awards. Lantana hosts regular community events, such as outdoor music presentations in the parks, chili cook offs, festivals, picnics, and other similar functions for its residents.

Lantana encompasses 1,780 acres (7.2 km^{2}). It was developed starting in 1999 on land acquired from the Rayzor family (known as Rayzor Ranch). On March 16, 2000, Republic Property broke ground on the community. Larkspur and Sandlin were the first neighborhoods developed. The first residents moved in on July 31, 2001. In the first quarter of 2014, Forestar Group, Inc, an original equity partner along with Republic Property Group, acquired the remaining partnership interest in Lantana and continued the final development of the community.

The homes in Lantana are built around an 18-hole golf course, designed by Jay Morrish. In October 2003, Lantana Golf Club became a semi-private facility. In October 2004, a 7,500 square-foot club house expansion was completed. The club went private in early 2009.

The Lantana Community Association, Lantana's HOA, is managed by Insight Association Management. HOA dues cover, security monitoring and system installation, front yard maintenance, and amenities. The Board of Directors of the Lantana Community Association are: Tara Boswell, Christi Brownlow and Darrel Amen. The Association is currently in the process of transitioning over to a Resident Board of Directors after the reaching the community size the state of Texas requires to do so. Lantana's monthly Board meetings are open to the public and take place in the Bartonville Town Square. Residents who have individual concerns about their home or the community in general may present those items at the monthly meetings.

Lantana residents pay an annual fee, through the Lantana Community Association, to the Argyle Volunteer Fire Department (AVFD) for Fire and EMS service. The fee is based on the appraised value of each home and the rate charged by the AVFD.

Lantana is located in Development District #4, Fresh Water Supply District #6 and Fresh Water Supply District #7. A Fresh Water Supply District (FWSD) is a political subdivision of the State of Texas, authorized by the Texas Commission of Environmental Quality, to provide water, sewage, drainage and other services within the district's boundaries.

The publicly elected Board of Directors manages and controls all of the affairs of the district, subject to the continuing supervision of the Texas Commission of Environmental Quality. The Board establishes policies in the interest of its residents and utility customers. A district may adopt and enforce all necessary charges, fees and taxes in order to provide facilities and service.

Four of Denton ISD's schools are located within the community: Tom Harpool Middle School and Annie Blanton Elementary School, which opened in August 2008, Eugenia Porter Rayzor Elementary, which was the first school to be built and opened in August 2002, and Dorothy Adkins Elementary School, which opened in August 2014. Blanton and EP Rayzor elementary schools are rated "Exemplary" and the middle school is rated "Recognized." Lantana is served by John H. Guyer High School, located in southern Denton, TX, about 3 miles (4.8 km) north of the northernmost neighborhood (Madison).

Lantana is divided into subdivisions or neighborhoods listed below:

- Azalea
- Bandera
- Bellaire
- Brazos
- Brenham
- Camden
- Carlisle
- Crescent
- Dakota
- Fairlin
- Gaillardia
- Garner
- Heritage
- Isabel
- Juniper
- Kendall
- Laurel
- Larkspur
- Laviana (luxuriest houses, large lots)
- Madison
- Magnolia
- Meridian
- Navarro
- Palmetto
- Sandlin (Lantana's first neighborhood)
- Sierra
- Telea
- Sonora
- Wimberley
- Wisteria
- Barrington (Lantana's Newest Neighborhood)
- Reata

Lantana has a sky/weather camera overlooking the park and pool in Larkspur subdivision. It's often seen on KDFW during the weather segment.

== Demographics ==
Historical population
Census	Pop.	Note	%±
2010	6,874		—
2020	10,785		56.9%
U.S. Decennial Census; 1850–1900 1910; 1920 1930 1940; 1950 1960 1970; 1980 1990 2000; 2010 2020

Lantana first appeared as a census designated place in the 2010 U.S. census.

=== Racial and ethnic composition ===
Lantana CDP, Texas – Racial and ethnic composition Note: the US Census treats Hispanic/Latino as an ethnic category. This table excludes Latinos from the racial categories and assigns them to a separate category. Hispanics/Latinos may be of any race.
Race / Ethnicity (NH = Non-Hispanic)	Pop 2010	Pop 2020	% 2010	% 2020
White alone (NH)	5,419	7,848	78.83%	72.77%
Black or African American alone (NH)	295	450	4.29%	4.17%
Native American or Alaska Native alone (NH)	20	51	0.29%	0.47%
Asian alone (NH)	329	712	4.79%	6.60%
Native Hawaiian or Pacific Islander alone (NH)	7	4	0.10%	0.04%
Other race alone (NH)	9	41	0.13%	0.38%
Mixed race or Multiracial (NH)	142	506	2.07%	4.69%
Hispanic or Latino (any race)	653	1,173	9.50%	10.88%
Total	6,874	10,785	100.00%	100.00%

=== 2020 census ===
As of the 2020 census, the median age was 39.0 years. 31.0% of residents were under the age of 18 and 10.4% of residents were 65 years of age or older. For every 100 females there were 97.2 males, and for every 100 females age 18 and over there were 95.9 males age 18 and over.

100.0% of residents lived in urban areas, while 0.0% lived in rural areas.

There were 3,413 households in Lantana, of which 51.7% had children under the age of 18 living in them. Of all households, 79.7% were married-couple households, 6.9% were households with a male householder and no spouse or partner present, and 11.3% were households with a female householder and no spouse or partner present. About 9.7% of all households were made up of individuals and 4.1% had someone living alone who was 65 years of age or older.

There were 3,478 housing units, of which 1.9% were vacant. The homeowner vacancy rate was 1.0% and the rental vacancy rate was 8.2%.

== Education ==
It is zoned to the Denton Independent School District.

Elementary schools serving sections include: Adkins Elementary School (in the CDP), E. P. Rayzor Elementary School (in the CDP), and Blanton Elementary School.

All portions are zoned to Harpool Middle School, and Guyer High School.

The majority of Denton County, Lantana included, is in the boundary of North Central Texas College.
