= Drop, Texas =

- Unincorporated community
- Location within Texas Location within the United States
- Coordinates: 33°07′51″N 97°21′21″W
- Country: United States
- State: Texas
- County: Denton
- Elevation: 758 ft (231 m)
- Time zone: UTC-6 (Central (CST))
  - Summer (DST): UTC-5 (CDT)
- GNIS feature ID: 1378230

Drop is an unincorporated community in Denton County, Texas, United States.

The early settlement was a supply point for the surrounding agricultural community.

== History ==
Settlers arrived in the area in 1854 and established towns within a larger community called the Denton Creek Settlement. Drop was founded within the Denton Creek Settlement in 1882 and operated a post office from 1886 to 1905. A school was built in 1922 and had three teachers. It operated until 1935, when students began attending school in Justin. The early Drop community had two stores and two churches, and for recreation, residents would go swimming at Drop Crossing on nearby Oliver Creek. The primary agricultural product on the farms surrounding Drop was wheat and Drop was a supply point for local farmers.

Business and people from Drop and other nearby communities began moving to Justin after a railroad was built there in the late 1800s. Drop had a population of 38 in 1936 and 30 in 1963.

== Geography ==
Drop is located on Farm to Market Road 1384 in southwest Denton County, 4 mi (6.4 km) northwest of Justin.

Dew Drop Airport is a private, grass covered airport located east of the settlement.

== In popular culture ==
Drop was one of the settings in the 1990 film Daddy's Dyin': Who's Got the Will?
