= Providence Village, Texas =

- City
- Location within the state of Texas
- Coordinates: 33°14′40″N 96°56′45″W
- Country: United States
- State: Texas
- County: Denton

Area
  - Total: 1.81 sq mi (4.68 km^{2})
  - Land: 1.78 sq mi (4.62 km^{2})
  - Water: 0.019 sq mi (0.05 km^{2})
- Elevation: 535 ft (163 m)

Population (2020)
  - Total: 7,691
  - Estimate (2025): 12,498
  - Density: 4,310/sq mi (1,660/km^{2})
- Time zone: UTC-6 (Central (CST))
  - Summer (DST): UTC-5 (CDT)
- ZIP codes: 76227
- FIPS code: 48-59748
- GNIS feature ID: 2703983
- Website: www.pvtx.gov

Providence Village is a new town in Denton County, Texas, United States. Composed largely of a master-planned community, it includes approximately 1,700 homes and 7,691 people as of the 2020 census. At the time of the 2010 census, the town had not yet incorporated, and was instead listed by the U.S. Census Bureau as the "Providence" census-designated place, with a population of 4,786.

== History ==
Providence Village was developed as a master-planned community in 2000. The developer, Huffines Communities, formed a special taxing entity known as Denton County Fresh Water Supply District #9 (DCFWSD #9) to help pay for the development's infrastructure. In order to attain road and police powers, the DCFWSD #9 was converted to a Water Control and Improvement District on November 30, 2000, and renamed the Providence Village Water Control and Improvement District in 2010. As of early 2010, the community was about two-thirds complete.

=== Incorporation ===
As early as 2004, residents of Providence Village began to study the possibility of incorporating the community. It wasn't until late 2008, however, that the idea again gained momentum. A group known as the Citizens for the Incorporation of Providence Village (CIPV) was formed to inform citizens, neighboring cities, and county officials of the effort. The CIPV was led by Brian Roberson, Clint Shipp, Eddie Army, Lisa Garcia, Earnest Law, Mark McCullough and Phillip Mack Furlow, and included over 100 volunteers. Denton County Commissioner Hugh Coleman played a pivotal role in facilitating the process. The desire to incorporate the community was due to several factors, including inadequate safety provisions, preservation of property values, and the retention of tax revenue.

Although located in unincorporated Denton County, portions of Providence Village sat within the extraterritorial jurisdiction (ETJ) of several cities, including Little Elm, Aubrey, Lincoln Park, and Cross Roads. For the incorporation process to move forward, all of the cities had to release portions of their ETJ to Providence Village. This was achieved in February 2010. Organizers then had to gather 50 signatures on an election petition. On February 26, the county elections administrator certified that enough petition signatures had been gathered for a proposition to incorporate Providence Village to be put to a vote. The Denton County Commissioners Court approved the item on March 2, 2010, which called for an incorporation election to be held on May 8, 2010.

The Providence Village Clubhouse served as the official polling place on election day. The ballot proposition asked voters whether they were in favor of or opposed to the incorporation of the Town of Providence Village as a Type A municipality. Of the 421 votes cast in the election, 296 (70.31%) voted for incorporation while 125 (29.69%) voted against the measure. Nearly twenty percent of the 2,210 eligible voters participated in the poll, which is considered a high turnout for a local election. The incorporation election results were canvassed by the Denton County Commissioners Court on May 11, 2010.

At the time of the incorporation, The Town of Providence Village was defined under state law as a Type A, general-law municipality. On May 11, 2010, the Denton County Commissioners Court called for an election to be held on June 19, 2010, to select a mayor and five aldermen at-large. Six candidates filed papers to run for the position of mayor, but five ended up on the ballot. Eleven candidates ran for the five alderman positions.

In the June 19 election, Brian Roberson, who previously led the Committee to Incorporate Providence Village (CIPV), was elected mayor with 58 percent of the vote. Eddie Army, Clint Shipp, Ernie Law, Mike Thompson, and Mark McCullough won seats on town's first council.

== Geography ==
Providence Village is situated along U.S. Highway 380 near the intersection with FM 2931 in east central Denton County.

Homes in Providence Village feature Cape Cod and Craftsman-style architecture. Major builders in the subdivision include D. R. Horton and History Maker Homes. Other features in the community include a clubhouse, two waterparks, greenbelts, two dog parks, and a 25-acre (100,000 m^{2}) lake.

== Demographics ==
Historical population
Census	Pop.	Note	%±
2010	4,786		—
2020	7,691		60.7%
2025 (est.)	12,498	▲	62.5%
U.S. Decennial Census; 2010 2020

In the 2010 U.S. census, the area covering Providence Village was listed as a census designated place using the name Providence. After incorporation as a town, the 2020 U.S. census used the name Providence Village.

=== 2020 census ===
Providence Village town, Texas – Racial and ethnic composition Note: the US Census treats Hispanic/Latino as an ethnic category. This table excludes Latinos from the racial categories and assigns them to a separate category. Hispanics/Latinos may be of any race.
Race / Ethnicity (NH = Non-Hispanic)	Pop 2010	Pop 2020	% 2010	% 2020
White alone (NH)	3,698	4,738	77.27%	61.60%
Black or African American alone (NH)	237	970	4.95%	12.61%
Native American or Alaska Native alone (NH)	30	48	0.63%	0.62%
Asian alone (NH)	39	90	0.81%	1.17%
Pacific Islander alone (NH)	6	7	0.13%	0.09%
Other race alone (NH)	5	60	0.10%	0.78%
Mixed race or Multiracial (NH)	104	474	2.17%	6.16%
Hispanic or Latino (any race)	667	1,304	13.94%	16.95%
Total	4,786	7,691	100.00%	100.00%

As of the 2020 United States census, there were 7,691 people, 2,194 households, and 1,880 families residing in the town.

== Education ==
Public education in Providence Village is provided by two Independent School Districts (ISDs), Aubrey and Denton.

The Aubrey Independent School District serves the portion of Providence Village that lies north of Fish Trap Road. Students are zoned to Monaco Elementary School (grades Pre-K–5), Owens Middle School (grades 6–8), and Aubrey High School (grades 9–12).

Areas south of Fish Trap Road are served by the Denton Independent School District. Students are zoned to Providence Elementary School, Rodriguez Middle School, and Braswell High School.

Previously students were zoned to Navo Middle School (grades 6–8), and Ryan High School (grades 9–12). As of 2016 Ray Braswell High School now serves the Denton ISD portion (Grades 9–12).

Both Monaco Elementary and Providence Elementary are located within the Providence Village community.
