= C. H. Collins Athletic Complex =

Multi-use stadium in Denton, Texas, U.S.

Coordinates: 33.261780°N 97.113030°W

CH Collins Athletic Complex
- CH Collins, Collins Stadium
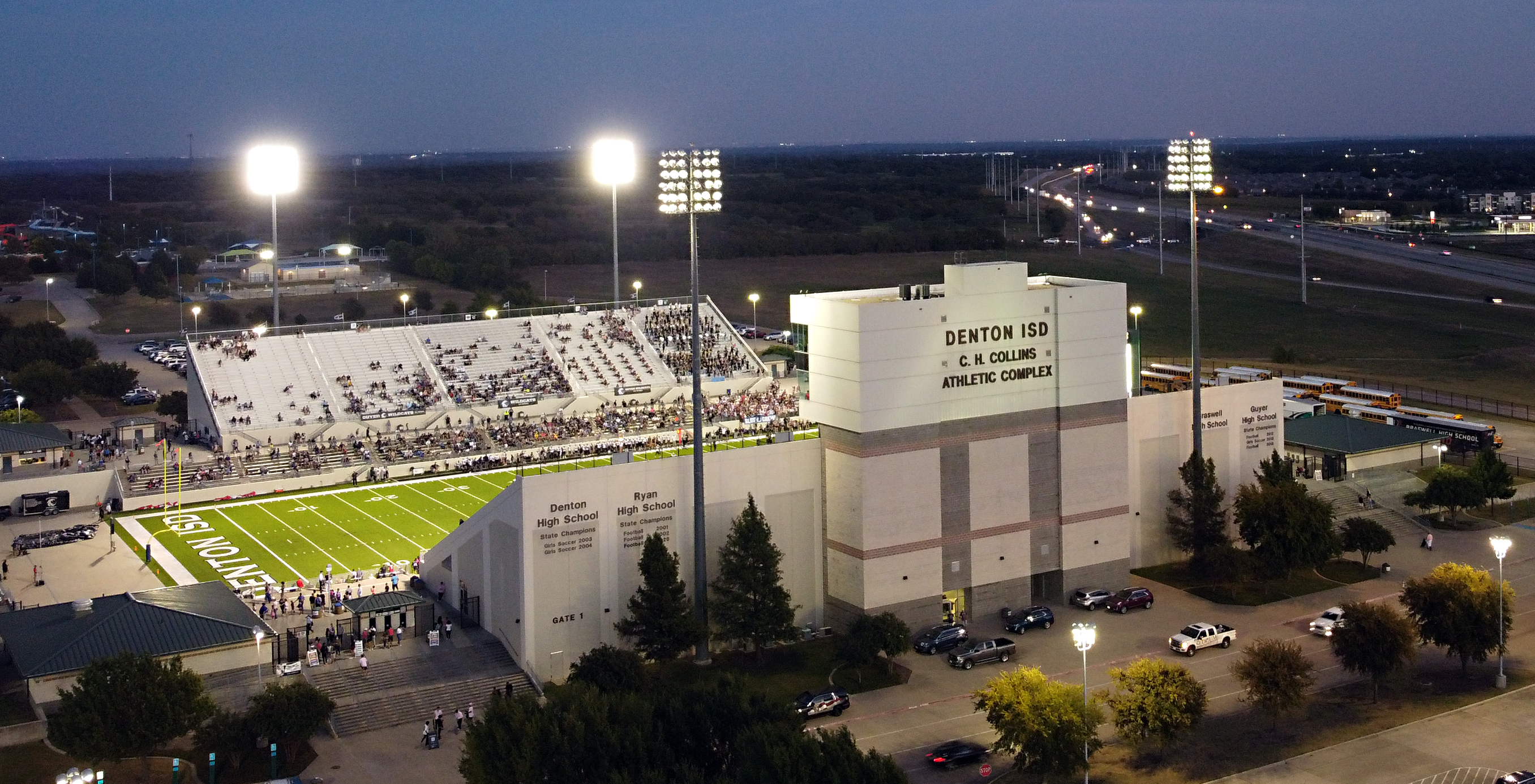
- Interactive map of CH Collins Athletic Complex
- Location: 1500 Long Road; Denton, Texas 76201
- Owner: Denton ISD
- Operator: Denton ISD
- Capacity: 12,000
- Surface: Field Turf

Construction
- Groundbreaking: 2002
- Opened: Sept. 3, 2004
- Cost: $21 Million USD
- Architect: VLK Architects

Tenants
- Billy Ryan High School (UIL) (2003-present); Denton High School (UIL) (2003-present); John H. Guyer High School (UIL) (2005-present); Dr. Ray Braswell High School (UIL) (2016-present)

CH Collins Stadium is a 12,000-capacity multi-use stadium in Denton, Texas. The stadium is used mostly for high school football and soccer. In the offseason of 2013, the field was upgraded with new artificial turf.

== In the media ==
In 2007, Under Armour filmed part of a popular commercial series called "Click-Clack" at the athletic complex.

== Radio and television ==
A nationally televised game between Southlake Carroll High School and Denton Ryan High School was aired on Fox Sports Network on Thursday, Oct. 13, 2005. Select Denton ISD games played at C.H. Collins are broadcast on KNTU-FM (88.1 The One) and the Denton ISD Television Channel.
