= Calallen, Corpus Christi, Texas =

District in Corpus Christi, Texas, United States

Coordinates: 27.856°N 97.623°W

Calallen (/kælˈælɪn/ kal-AL-in) is a former town in Nueces County in the Coastal Bend region of Texas. Once an independent rural community, it was annexed by the city of Corpus Christi in 1970 and is now a major suburban area of the city. Today, Calallen retains its community identity through its school district, historic sites, and local cultural heritage programs supported by the City of Corpus Christi.

== History ==
Long before European settlers arrived, the area that became Calallen was part of the traditional territory of the Karankawa people, a nomatic Indigenous group along the Texas Gulf Coast. According to the Texas Parks and Wildlife Department, the Karankawa inhabited coastal zones from what is now Corpus Christi Bay inland, living by hunting, fishing, and gathering. Their presence shaped the earliest cultural landscape of the region.

By late nineteenth century, the land along the Nueces River was home to rancher Calvin Joseph “Cal” Allen (1859—1922). The New Encyclopedia of Texas (1929) described Allen as "one of the most beloved characters of the old Southwest." Allen's first land purchase was from Alice Magee and consisted of 1,117 acres for $4,000. Upon his death, the Corpus Christi Caller called him "one of the most highly honored and prominent ranchmen of the Southwest". Allen eventually managed a 5,000-acre ranch where he raised wild cattle and later improved his herds with fine-blooded stock, becoming a notable figure in the early South Texas ranching.

In 1900 the St. Louis, Brownsville and Mexico Railway, which was building southward to the Rio Grande Valley, decided to bypass the pioneer community of Nuecestown and run its tracks a few miles away. Allen donated right-of-way to the railroad; in return, the railroad built a water stop and depot on Allen’s property. Allen then divided some of his ranch land along the nearby Nueces River into lots and put it on the market. Soon a community formed along the railroad.

The railroad initially named the stop Calvin. However, when it was discovered that another town in Texas had secured that name, residents settled on Calallen, combining Allen’s nickname and surname. The community received a post office in 1908 with Ira D. Magee as the first postmaster. Meanwhile, Nuecestown slowly dissipated.

The main part of Calallen grew around the west side of the railroad tracks, and included a bank, lumber yard, pharmacy, funeral home, meat market and numerous general mercantile stores. Two passenger trains stopped at Calallen each day in addition to regular freight traffic. In 1914 the town had 150 residents and nine businesses. Its population fell to twenty-five by 1925 but reached 100 in 1939.

Calallen had Baptist, Catholic and Methodist churches and a large two-story hotel on its main street. Its top employer was the Corpus Christi Water Plant, one of the first large non-agricultural employers in the area. Calallen Dam was the first dam built by Corpus Christi in the late 1800s. The dams original purpose was to divert saltwater, but now it holds the Calallen Pool, one of Corpus Christi's main freshwater sources.

Other businesses continued to move into the town and its peripheral area. Among these were the C. E. Coleman vegetable packing sheds, which sat along the railroad tracks, the Calallen Gin, and the Ault Apiary, where bees were raised. Familiar names in the community included Allen, Atkinson, Ault, Bickham, Harney, Hearn, Hunter, Magee, McKinzie and Noakes.

After World War II, Calallen's role in local industry diminished. The post office was discontinued sometime after 1960. Calallen was never legally incorporated, and by 1966 it was annexed by the City of Corpus Christi.

Although Calallen was no longer its own city, the impact it made on agriculture and the growth it added to Corpus Christi was vital. The original community name survives in the Calallen Independent School District, Calallen Dam and numerous businesses.

== Transportation ==
Calallen, Corpus Christi is served by several major transportation corridors that connect the western and northern parts of Corpus Christi to the rest of South Texas. The community lies near the major intersection point of Interstate 37 and U.S. Route 77 two federally designated highways that link San Antonio, the Rio Grande Valley, and coastal communities. This junction has historically made Calallen an important access point for travel and commerce in the Coastal Bend.

After crossing the Nueces River, Interstate 37 continues northwest towards Mathis (18 miles / 29 km) and eventually to San Antonio (126 miles / 203 km), while U.S. Highway 77 leads northeast towards Sinton (12 miles / 19 km) and eventually to Victoria (80 miles / 130 km). These routes form key components of the federal and state highway system, providing regional connectivity for residents, businesses, and industry.

Calallen, Corpus Christi is also home to the eastern terminus of FM 624, which runs west toward Orange Grove (20 miles (32 km) and rural Nueces County. FM 624 serves as an important local transportation artery, linking suburban neighborhoods, schools, and commercial areas within the Calallen area to surrounding communities.

== Geology ==
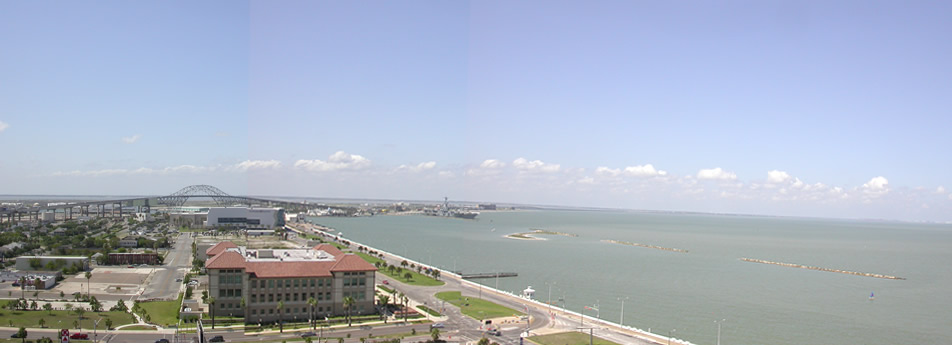
The Corpus Christi Bay where Calallen lies within.

The Calallen area lies within the western portion of the Coastal Bend, a region shaped by its proximity to the Corpus Christi Bay and Nueces River. The surrounding landscape is generally flat, but parts of northwest Corpus Christi, including Calallen, sits on gently rolling terrain formed by the river valley. The soils of this river valley are made up of sandy material that came from older rivers over time, which resulted in geographic features being created. These geographic features influenced early settlement patterns, transportation routes, and later public infrastructure development. This position near major water ways contributes to Calallen's frequent exposure to coastal breezes and humid Gulf air, characteristic of the South Texas coastal plain.

== Parks and Wildlife ==
Hilltop Community Center is one of Calallen's most notable park as it stretches for 32 acres and includes many different activity's for everyone. The community center that is located on this park is used for many different things including nonprofit groups, meetings, and sports activities. This park is also home to the vintage Ault-Atkinson house that visitors can tour on certain days. This park also has a 4 mile trail, skate park, BBQ pits, a basketball court, as well as bird watching views.

Hazel Bazemore park is another notable park as the Nueces river runs directly through this77.6 acre park . The park was named after a dedicated young lady who was from Oklahoma. Miss Hazel Maria Bazemore was a home demonstration agent who was living in Robstown at the time. On April 4, 1954, she was a passenger in a deadly head on collision that cut her life short at the age of 26. In 1947 the park was donated to Nueces County and in April 1955 the county commissioner at the time proposed naming the park in Hazel Bazemore's honor. This park is well known for its bird watching as there is over 24 species of raptors and is popular among hawk enthusiast. The Nueces river opens up opportunities for fishing, swimming, and has a boat ramp for river exploration.

== Education ==
- Calallen Independent School District
  - Calallen High School (Grades 9–12)
  - Calallen Middle School (Grades 6–8)
  - Magee Intermediate School (Kindergarten-5th)
  - West Intermediate School (Grades 4th and 5th)
  - East Primary School (Grades Kindergarten-3)
  - Wood River Primary School (Grades Kindergarten-3)

Calallen is served by the Calallen Independent School District, which remains one of the most visible institutions preserving the community's identity after its annexation into Corpus Christi. The district has long been recognized for its strong academic and extracurricular programs, including athletics. Calallen High School's football team is especially well known in South Texas, having made multiple deep playoff runs and reaching the state championship game in 2005 and 2016. For many years, the football program was led by head coach Phil Danaher, who has the most wins of any high school coach in Texas with 427 wins (as of 2016).

Beyond Athletics, Calallen High School also offers an agricultural program called Future Farmers of America (FFA), where students learn "hands-on, real-life agricultural career preparation experience tied to agricultural science curriculum, student aptitudes, interests and career and educational goals and to the agricultural industry." The significance of the program in Calallen is tied to the history of agriculture that jump started the community and made Calallen what it is today.

== See also ==
- Corpus Christi
