= G. A. Moore =

American football player and coach (1938/1939–2025)

Biographical details
- Born: November 23, 1938; Mustang, Texas, U.S.
- Died: September 5, 2025 (aged 86)

Playing career
- 1959–1961: North Texas State

Coaching career (HC unless noted)
- 1962: Bryson HS (TX)
- 1963–1970: Pilot Point HS (TX)
- 1972–1976: Celina HS (TX)
- 1977–1985: Pilot Point HS (TX)
- 1986–1987: Sherman HS (TX)
- 1988–2001: Celina HS (TX)
- 2002–2004: Pilot Point HS (TX)
- 2009–2011: Aubrey HS (TX)

Head coaching record
- Overall: 426–92–9

Accomplishments and honors

Championships
- 6 2A Texas football state championships (1981, 1995, 1998–2001); 2 2A Texas football state Co-championships (1974, 1980)

Gary Autry Moore Jr. (November 23, 1938 – September 5, 2025) was an American high school football head coach in the state of Texas. He retired after completing the 2011 season with a career head coaching record of 422–86–9, which at the time was the most in Texas high school football history. Moore's win total was passed on November 3, 2016, by Phil Danaher of Calallen High School in Corpus Christi, Texas. In 44 seasons as a head football coach, Moore won six outright state championships, and two co-championships for Celina and Pilot Point combined.

== Playing career ==
Moore attended Pilot Point High School (Pilot Point, Texas) and was a four-year letterman in football, basketball, baseball, and track. He was named to the All-State first team in football and basketball. Moore went on to play running back at the University of North Texas in Denton, Texas. He graduated from North Texas in 1962 with a Bachelor of Science degree.

== Coaching career ==
Moore started his coaching career as the head coach of Bryson High School. Prior to Moore's arrival, Bryson was on a 21-game losing streak. Under Moore, Bryson went 5-5. The following year, Moore left to become the head coach at his alma mater, Pilot Point. After suffering six consecutive losing seasons, Moore got them to be one of the better 2A teams in the state.

Moore took a hiatus from coaching from 1970 to 1972. He accepted the head coaching job at Celina High School. In the next five years he went 52–5–2 where he won his first State Championship in 1974. Moore left in 1977 to return to Pilot Point as head coach. Pilot Point was 1-9 the year prior to Moore's return. During his second stint, the Bearcats were 106-9-3 with back to back state championships in 1980 and 1981.

In 1986, Moore left to take the head coaching job at Sherman High School. Sherman was 0-10 the previous year. Moore turned them into a 6-4 team his first year and was named the Dallas Area Coach of the Year. His head coaching job at Sherman lasted only two years before leaving to go back to Celina as the head coach. Celina became district champions in his first year back after not winning a district title in over 10 years. They finished as state-semifinalists that same year. During the next 14 years, Moore went 163–22. Celina won five State Championships including sharing a state record four in a row with Sealy High School. When Moore left Celina in 2001, he had a 57-game winning streak.

Moore became the head coach once again at Pilot Point. He returned them to winning status with playoff appearances in both seasons. He retired in 2004 before coming out of retirement in 2009 to take the head coaching job at Aubrey High School. Aubrey finished Moore's first season 11–2, winning a school record 11 games, with the losses coming to eventual undefeated state champion (as well as Moore's alma mater) Pilot Point in the final regular season game, and to then-undefeated McGregor in the third round of the 2A Division II playoffs. In 2011, Moore suffered his first losing season with a 1-11 finish. Moore retired for a second time after the season.

== Personal life and death ==
Moore married fellow Pilot Point alum Lois Ann after they began dating while in college together. The couple have three daughters and one son. Moore's son, Gary Don, coached as an assistant for him while at Celina, Pilot Point and Aubrey. After Moore's first retirement, Gary Don moved onto become an assistant coach at Plano West and Plano East. Gary Don left coaching after being diagnosed with Lou Gehrig's Disease. Around 2005, G. A. Moore was forced to retire due to lack of energy. He sought treatment for blockages in his heart by means of stents. He claimed this helped him return to normal. He resided working on his 200-acre ranch outside of Pilot Point. Moore was a pastor at Pilot Point's Mustang Baptist Church.

Moore died on September 5, 2025, at the age of 86.
