= Navo, Texas =

- Unincorporated community
- Location within the state of Texas Navo (the United States)
- Coordinates: 33°13′14″N 96°55′48″W
- Country: United States
- State: Texas
- County: Denton
- Elevation: 591 ft (180 m)
- Time zone: UTC-6 (Central (CST))
  - Summer (DST): UTC-5 (CDT)
- GNIS feature ID: 1378729

Navo is an unincorporated community in east central Denton County, Texas, United States, located along U.S. Highway 380, approximately 10 miles east of Denton.

== History ==
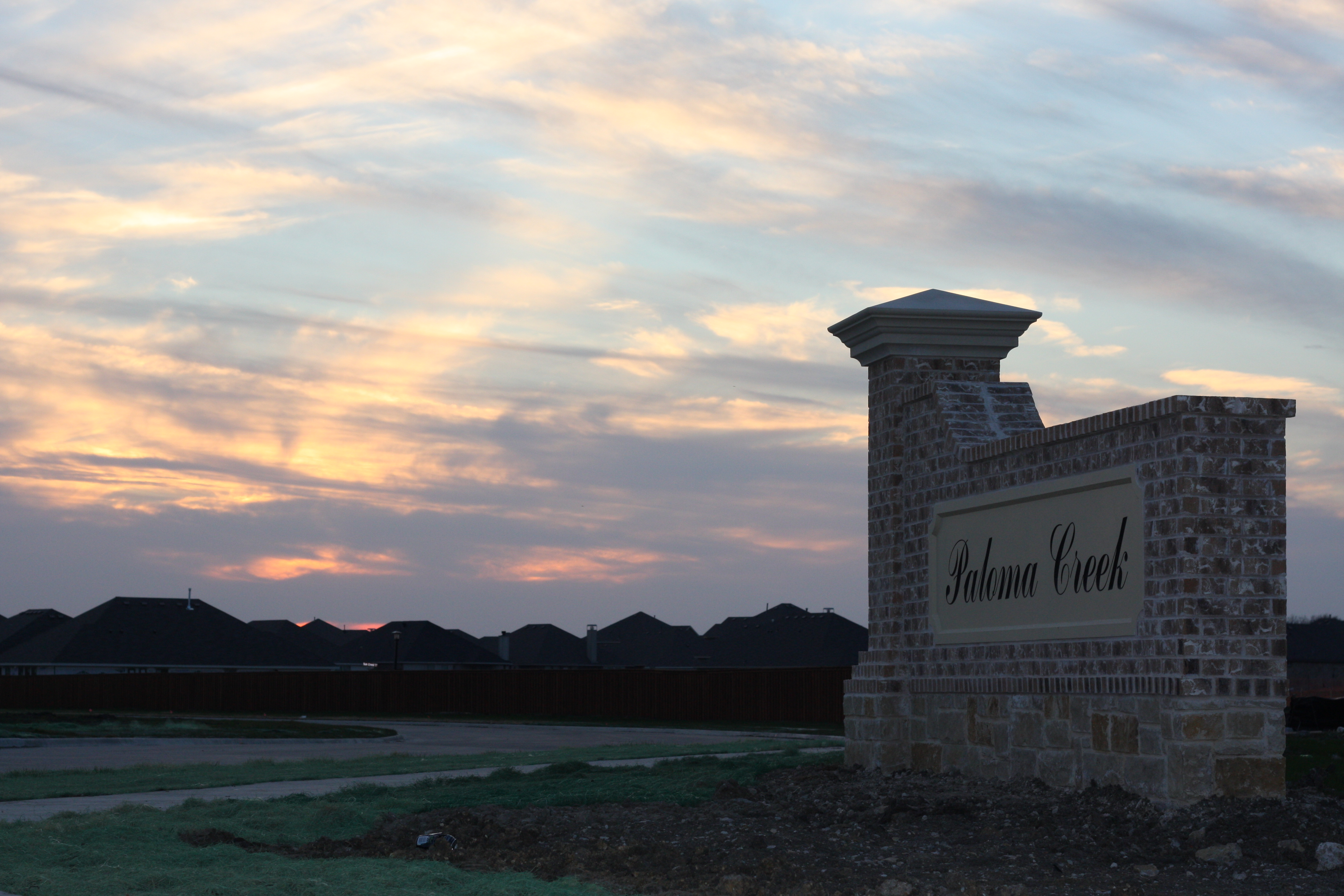
Sunset at Paloma Creek's entrance in Little Elm, Texas.

According to the Handbook of Texas, Navo began in 1847 by Thomas Navo, its namesake. A post office existed from 1884–1907, and Navo had a population of 36 from the mid-1930s through the late 1980s. For many years the town had a grocery store and gas station, which has been used for several businesses off-and-on since. The population was 35 in 2000, though a few nearby subdivided communities of Denton have sprung up as the area between Denton and McKinney, Texas continues to grow in population. The community of Paloma Creek sits on what was formerly considered Navo (which technically no longer exists). The Town of Little Elm has also annexed much of the local property not already included in Denton County Fresh Water Supply Districts. Navo Fire Station and Navo Road continue to carry the name of the former community.

== Education ==
The Denton Independent School District serves area students. Nearby Navo Middle School is named for the small farming community.
