= David B. Robinson =

American Navy admiral

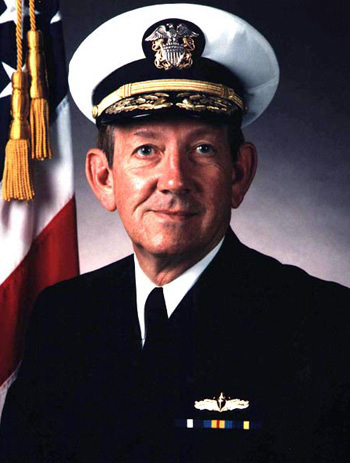
- Born: 26 October 1939 (age 87); Alexandria, Louisiana, U.S.
- Military career
- Allegiance: United States of America
- Branch: United States Navy
- Service years: 1963–1996
- Rank: Vice Admiral
- Commands: Naval Surface Force Pacific; Cruiser Destroyer Group 8; USS Richmond K. Turner; USS Luce; USS Ready; USS Canon
- Conflicts: Vietnam War; Gulf War
- Awards: Navy Cross; Defense Distinguished Service Medal; Navy Distinguished Service Medal (2); Legion of Merit (5); Bronze Star Medal; Purple Heart; Meritorious Service Medal

David Brooks Robinson (born 26 October 1939) is a retired United States Navy vice admiral. He served as commander, Naval Surface Force Pacific from 1993 to 1996. Robinson was awarded the Navy Cross for his actions as the commanding officer of a patrol gunboat in Vietnam.

== Early life and education ==
Born in Alexandria, Louisiana and raised in Denton, Texas, Robinson graduated from Denton Senior High School in 1958. He then studied at Texas A&M University for one year before being appointed to the United States Naval Academy in 1959. Robinson graduated in June 1963 with a B.S. degree in naval science. He later earned an M.S. degree in oceanography from the Naval Postgraduate School in October 1969. His thesis was entitled Seiching in Monterey Bay.

== Military career ==
A career surface warfare officer, Robinson commanded the patrol gunboats USS Canon from November 1969 to March 1971 and USS Ready from March 1971 to September 1971 in South Vietnam. During a patrol mission up the Bồ Đề River on 11 August 1970, Canon came under simultaneous fire from enemy forces concealed on both shores. Despite a broken leg and shrapnel wounds from a rocket explosion, Robinson directed return fire until the attack was suppressed. He then remained at his post strapped to an upright stretcher until Canon was safely moored at a forward base upstream. Robinson was subsequently awarded the Navy Cross for his actions.

Robinson served as the executive officer of the guided missile destroyer USS Dale from October 1974 to April 1976. He then served as the commanding officer of the guided missile destroyer USS Luce from April 1976 to July 1978. Robinson later served as the commanding officer of the guided missile cruiser USS Richmond K. Turner from January 1983 to July 1984.

As a flag officer, Robinson commanded Cruiser Destroyer Group 8 from July 1988 to August 1989. He then served as Vice Director and Director for Operational Plans and Interoperability on the Joint Staff from September 1989 to December 1991, which included Pentagon oversight and analysis of Gulf War operations. Robinson next became Deputy Commander-in-Chief and Chief of Staff for the U.S. Pacific Fleet in January 1992.

In April 1993, Robinson was promoted to vice admiral and assumed command of the Naval Surface Force, U.S. Pacific Fleet.

== Personal ==
Robinson married Juliet Gene Kirkpatrick (22 March 1940 – 12 October 2005) on 1 August 1964 in Denton, Texas. They have two sons and five grandchildren.

== Navy Cross citation ==
The President of the United States of America takes pleasure in presenting the Navy Cross to Lieutenant Commander David Brooks Robinson (NSN: 0-669469), United States Navy, for extraordinary heroism while serving as Commanding Officer of the Patrol Gunboat, U.S.S. CANON (PG-90), during operations against enemy forces in the Republic of Vietnam on 11 August 1970. While Lieutenant Commander Robinson was directing his ship's harassment and interdiction fire as the craft proceeded up the Bo De River, the ship suddenly came under intense enemy automatic weapons, rocket and small arms attack from an estimated forty-man force located in well-concealed positions in a mangrove swamp on both banks of the river. During the initial hail of enemy fire, Lieutenant Commander Robinson sustained a broken leg and numerous shrapnel wounds when a rocket exploded on the port side of the flying bridge. Despite his serious wounds and loss of blood, he continued to direct his ship's fire until the enemy attack was suppressed. Refusing medical evacuation, Lieutenant Commander Robinson submitted to first-aid treatment and then requested that he be strapped in a stretcher and placed in an upright position so that he could continue to direct the actions of his ship until it cleared the enemy ambush site. Only after the ship was anchored at an advanced tactical support base and he was assured that his ship and crew were capable of continuing their assigned mission, did he allow himself to be medically evacuated. By his extraordinary courage, resolute fighting spirit and inspiring personal example in the face of a fierce enemy attack, Lieutenant Commander Robinson upheld the finest tradition of the United States Naval Service.
