= Phil Danaher =

Phil Danaher may refer to:

- Phil Danaher (American football) (born 1948), American football coach
- Phil Danaher (rugby union) (born 1965), retired Irish rugby union player
