= Drew Sanders =

American football player (born 2001)

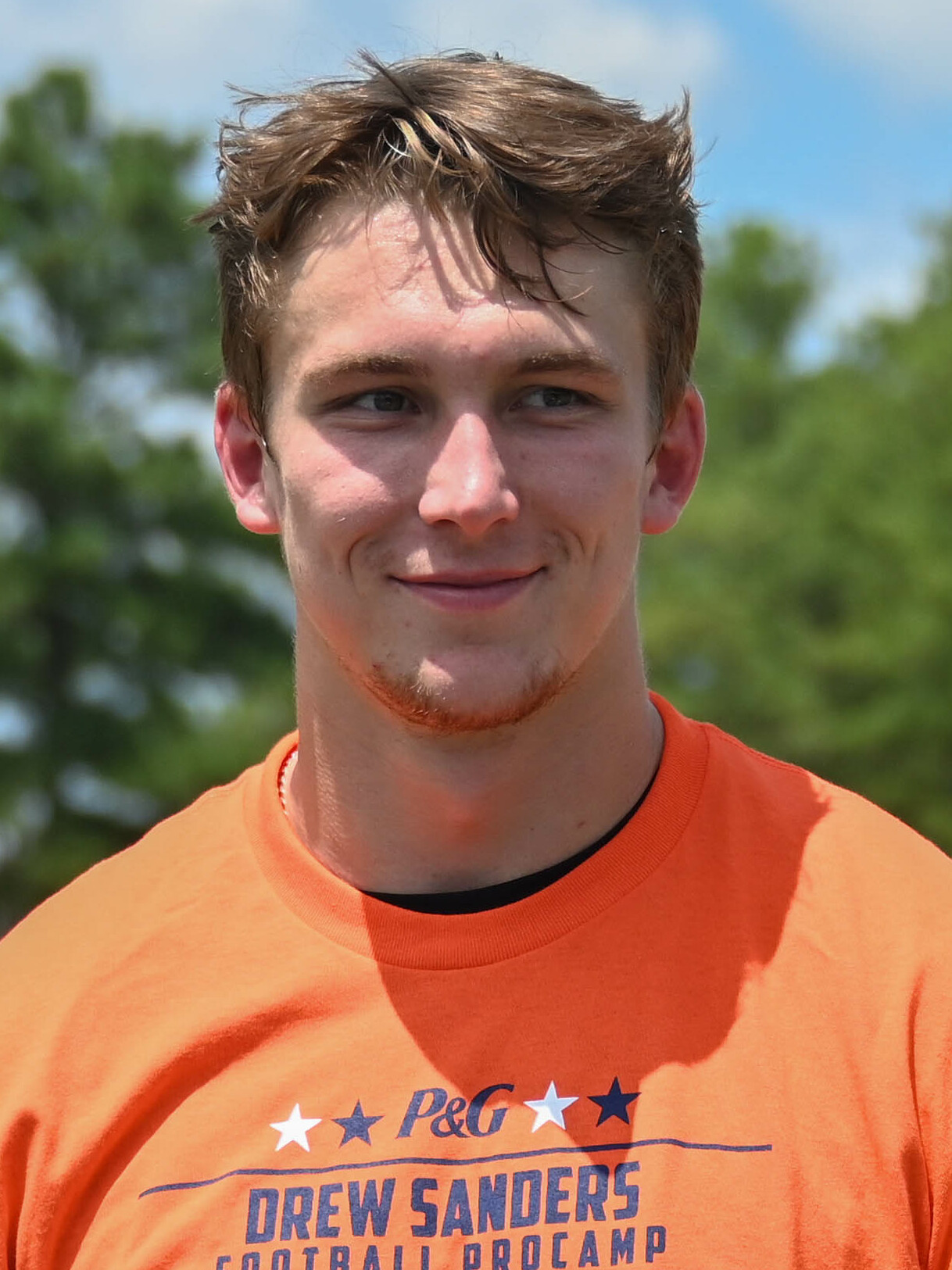
- Sanders in 2023

Profile
- Position: Outside linebacker

Personal information
- Born: December 31, 2000 (age 25); Dallas, Texas, U.S.
- Listed height: 6 ft 5 in (1.96 m)
- Listed weight: 233 lb (106 kg)

Career information
- High school: Billy Ryan (Denton, Texas)
- College: Alabama (2020–2021); Arkansas (2022)
- NFL draft: 2023: 3rd round, 67th overall pick

Career history
- Denver Broncos (2023–2026)

Awards and highlights
- CFP national champion (2020); First-team All-American (2022); First-team All-SEC (2022)

Career NFL statistics as of 2024
- Total tackles: 32
- Sacks: 1
- Fumble recoveries: 1
- Stats at Pro Football Reference

Drew Sanders (born December 31, 2000) is an American professional football outside linebacker. He played college football for the Alabama Crimson Tide, where he was a member of the team that won the 2021 College Football Playoff National Championship, before transferring to the Arkansas Razorbacks in 2022. Sanders was selected by the Denver Broncos in the third round of the 2023 NFL draft.

== Early life ==
Sanders grew up in Oregon, where his father Mitch Sanders coached football and served as Athletic Director in multiple cities such as Hood River, Pendleton, and Hermiston. At the start of his High School career, his family relocated to Texas. He initially attended Lake Dallas High School, where his father was part of the school's coaching staff, and played linebacker and quarterback. As a freshman, Sanders passed for 392 yards and two touchdowns and also rushed for 438 yards and eight touchdowns. At the end of the school year, he transferred to Colleyville Heritage High School after his father was hired to a coaching position there. He committed to play college football at Oklahoma as a sophomore. Sanders transferred a second time after his sophomore year when his father was hired at Billy Ryan High School. He flipped his commitment from Oklahoma to Alabama during his junior year. Sanders was a 5-star recruit during his senior season, and ranked the #22 player in the country by 247Sports.

== College career ==
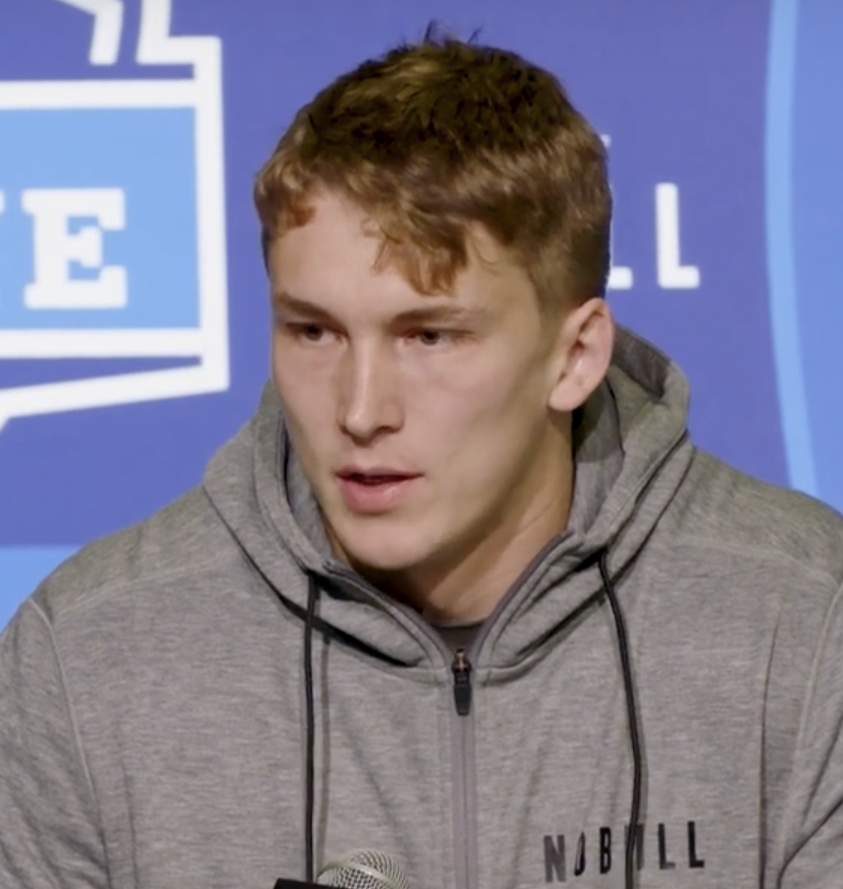
Sanders at the 2023 NFL Combine

Sanders played mostly on special teams during his freshman season and made nine tackles. As a sophomore, he became a starter in place of Christopher Allen following an injury. Sanders finished the season with 24 tackles, one sack, 2.5 tackles for a loss, and two passes defended. Following the end of the season, he entered the NCAA transfer portal.

Sanders ultimately transferred to Arkansas.

Sanders started at middle linebacker for Arkansas in all twelve games of the 2022 season, leading the team in tackles (103) and sacks (9.5). He was named to the 2022 College Football All-America Team and was a finalist for the Butkus Award. Sanders elected to forgo participation in the 2022 Liberty Bowl as well as his senior season to enter the 2023 NFL draft.

== Professional career ==
Pre-draft measurables
Height	Weight	Arm length	Hand span	Wingspan	40-yard dash	10-yard split	20-yard split	20-yard shuttle	Three-cone drill	Vertical jump	Broad jump
6 ft 4 3/8 in (1.94 m)	235 lb (107 kg)	32 1/8 in (0.82 m)	9 3/4 in (0.25 m)	6 ft 4 5/8 in (1.95 m)	4.66 s	1.61 s	2.68 s	4.38 s	7.18 s	37.0 in (0.94 m)	9 ft 10 in (3.00 m)
All values from NFL Combine/Pro Day

Sanders was drafted by the Denver Broncos in the third round, 67th overall, of the 2023 NFL draft. He played in all 17 of the Broncos' games in 2023, starting four games and logging 24 combined tackles with one fumble recovery.

During Denver's offseason program in April 2024, Sanders suffered a torn Achilles tendon and underwent successful surgery shortly thereafter. On November 26, 2024, Sanders was activated off the PUP list. During Week 16 against the Los Angeles Chargers, on his sole defensive snap of the game and first defensive snap of the season, Sanders tackled Justin Herbert for his first career sack.

On July 26, 2025, Sanders suffered a foot tendon injury during training camp. On August 26, he was placed on short-term injured reserve. Despite the short-term designation, Sanders was not activated for the rest of the season.

On April 20, 2026, it was reported that Sanders would be switching positions from inside to outside linebacker. On August 30, he was waived by the Broncos with an injury designation. The next day, Sanders reverted to injured reserve. He was released from injured reserve on September 8.
