= Louise Tobin =

American jazz singer and musician (1918–2022)

- Born: Mary Louise Tobin; November 11, 1918; Aubrey, Texas, U.S.
- Died: November 26, 2022 (aged 104) Carrollton, Texas, U.S.
- Genres: Jazz
- Occupations: Singer, musician
- Years active: 1934–1998

Mary Louise Tobin (November 11, 1918 – November 26, 2022) was an American jazz singer and musician. She appeared with Benny Goodman, Bobby Hackett, Will Bradley, and Jack Jenney. Tobin introduced "I Didn't Know What Time It Was" with Goodman's band in 1939. Her biggest hit with Goodman was "There'll Be Some Changes Made", which was number two on Your Hit Parade in 1941 for 15 weeks. Tobin was the first wife of trumpeter and bandleader Harry James, with whom she had two sons.

== Early years ==
The daughter of Mr. and Mrs. Hugh Tobin, she was born in Aubrey, Texas on November 11, 1918, but moved with her family to Denton, Texas, after her father died. When she was 12, she appeared on stage with the North Texas Stage Band. Tobin began singing at Denton High School when she was 14 years old.

== Career ==
In 1934, Tobin also sang at the Sylvan Club, near Arlington, Texas, and at theaters in Beaumont, Dallas, and Houston, Texas. At the age of 16, on May 4, 1935, she married 19-year-old Harry James, who was also playing locally. They had two sons: Harry (born 1941) and Jerin Timothyray "Tim" James (born March 21, 1942). Tobin brought Frank Sinatra to James' attention in 1939 after hearing Sinatra sing on the radio. James subsequently signed Sinatra to a one-year contract at $75 a week.

While Tobin was singing with Bobby Hackett's band at Nick's in Greenwich Village, jazz critic and producer John Hammond heard her and brought Benny Goodman to a performance of hers. Tobin soon joined the Goodman band and went on to record "There'll Be Some Changes Made", "Scatterbrain", "Comes Love", "Love Never Went to College", "What's New?", and "Blue Orchids" with Goodman. Johnny Mercer wrote "Louise Tobin Blues" especially for her while she was with the group. It was arranged by Fletcher Henderson.

In 1940, Tobin recorded "Deed I Do" and "Don't Let It Get You Down", with Will Bradley and His Orchestra. Tobin and James were divorced May 1943 in Juárez, Mexico.

In 1945, she recorded "All through the Day" with Tommy Jones and His Orchestra, and "June Comes Every Year" with Emil Coleman and His Orchestra. In 1946, she performed with Skippy Anderson's Band at the Melodee Club in Los Angeles, and, in 1950, she recorded "Sunny Disposish" with Ziggy Elman and His Orchestra.

After a long hiatus spent raising her two boys, Tobin accepted an invitation from jazz critic and publisher George Simon to sing at the 1962 Newport Jazz Festival, where she met her future husband, clarinetist Peanuts Hucko. The Whitney Balliett review of the festival published in The New Yorker included the statement: "Louise Tobin sings like the young Ella Fitzgerald". Hucko and Tobin began performing together regularly, including at the Gibson-inspired Odessa Jazz Parties and a regular engagement at Blues Alley in Washington, D.C. They married in 1967 and moved to Denver, Colorado, where they were co-owners and the house band of the Navarre Club.

In 1974, Hucko led the Glenn Miller Orchestra, touring worldwide with Tobin singing. In 1977, Tobin recorded "There'll Be Some Changes Made" with Hucko on the album San Diego Jazz Club Plays the Sound of Jazz. "There'll Be Some Changes Made" became an oft-requested fan favorite at concerts. In the 1980s, they toured Europe, Australia, and Japan with the Pied Piper Quartet and recorded the albums Tribute to Louis Armstrong and Tribute to Benny Goodman, featuring Tobin singing several numbers on both. In 1992, Starline Records issued Swing That Music, including a vocal duet with Hucko and Tobin singing "When You're Smiling". This was their final recording made together. Hucko died in 2003.

In 2008, Tobin donated her extensive collection of original musical arrangements, press clippings, programs, recordings, playbills, and photographs to create the Tobin-Hucko Jazz Collection at Texas A&M University-Commerce. A biography of Tobin, Texas Jazz Singer--Louise Tobin in the Golden Age of Swing and Beyond by Kevin Mooney, was published in May 2021.

Tobin was featured on the jazz program "Hot Jazz Saturday Night" just three weeks before she died.

== Death ==
Tobin died at the home of her granddaughter in Carrollton, Texas on November 26, 2022, aged 104.

== Selected performance affiliations ==
Vocalist

- 1934: Interstate Theater Circuit, Dallas
- 1935: Art Hicks Band, Dallas and Arlington, Texas
- 1937: Ben Pollack Band
- 1938: Bobby Hackett Band, Jack Jenney Band, New York City
- 1939: Will Bradley — Ray McKinley, Harry James Band, New York City and Massachusetts
- 1939: Benny Goodman Band, New York City and on tour
- 1945: Ziggy Elman Band, Los Angeles
- 1974: Glenn Miller Band
- 1962–1998: Peanuts Hucko (husband)
