= Aubrey High School =

Location
- 510 Spring Hill Road; Aubrey, Denton County, Texas 76227; United States; 33.2964°N 96.9806°W

Information
- School type: Public high school
- Motto: Challenging Ourselves to be World Class
- Opened: 1998 (current campus); 1966 (original campus)
- School district: Aubrey Independent School District
- NCES District ID: 4808910
- NCES School ID: 480891000288
- Principal: Vanessa Zavar
- Teaching staff: 60.98 (FTE)
- Grades: 9-12
- Enrollment: 1,039 (2023-2024)
  - Grade 9: 300
  - Grade 10: 268
  - Grade 11: 249
  - Grade 12: 222
- Student to teacher ratio: 17.04
- Colors: Red, navy, and white
- Athletics conference: UIL Class AAAA
- Mascot: Chaparral
- Website: Aubrey High School

Aubrey High School is a public high school located in the city of Aubrey, Texas, USA and classified as a 4A school by the UIL. It is a part of the Aubrey Independent School District located in east central Denton County and serves students in Aubrey and Krugerville. In 2015, the school was rated "Met Standard" by the Texas Education Agency.

The school, much like others in Denton County, has experienced rapid growth. In 2021 the school graduated its second largest class in the institution's history. This led to the school moving from UIL Conference 2A to 3A in 2010, and moving again to 4A in 2014 after the UIL created Conference 6A.

== Athletics ==
Aubrey's athletics compete in UIL Conference 4A. The Aubrey Chaparrals compete in Marching Band, Volleyball, Cross Country, Football, Basketball, Powerlifting, Golf, Baseball, Track & Field and Softball, and recently added a soccer team, which does not yet compete in the UIL. In each of its UIL events except football and soccer, Aubrey competes in District 4A-11, competing against Anna, Celina, Panther Creek, Ranchview, and Van Alstyne High Schools. The Aubrey Chaparral Football team competes in 4A Division II, in District 5. Its district foes are Bridgeport, Farmersville, Gainesville, Krum, Sanger, and Van Alstyne. Both the boys' and girls' soccer teams also play in District 4A-11, but with a somewhat different composition. Carrollton Ranchview and Van Alstyne are not in Aubrey's soccer district, but Farmersville (normally in District 14), Gainesville (normally in District 7), Bonham and Pilot Point (both of which compete in Conference 3A in most events) are.

In recent years, Aubrey has found success in its track and field program in addition to its team sports, placing second in Class 4A at the 2023 state meet, and winning back-to-back regional championships as well.

== UIL Academics ==
Aubrey High School also runs a number of academically focused teams to compete in UIL competitions. They have seen success historically, especially in speech events.

Additionally, the UIL Academics team has won the following team titles

- Speech Sweepstakes
  - State Champions: 2004, 2007

== Aubrey High School Marching Band ==
The Aubrey High School Marching Band regularly competes in regional and state-level competitions, including the University Interscholastic League (UIL) Marching Band Contests.

The band has qualified for the Texas UIL State Marching Band Competition in the following years:

- 2007-2008
- 2009-2010
- 2024-2025:
- 2025-2026:
