= Calallen Independent School District =

School district in Texas, United States

Address
- 4205 Wildcat Drive Corpus Christi, Texas, 78410; United States

District information
- Grades: PK–12
- Schools: 7
- NCES District ID: 4812420

Students and staff
- Students: 3,877 (2023–2024)
- Teachers: 287.70 (on an FTE basis)
- Student–teacher ratio: 13.48:1

Other information
- Website: www.calallen.org

Calallen Independent School District (CISD) is a school district located in northwest Corpus Christi, Texas (USA) in northern Nueces County that served to educate the Calallen Area. The district has approximately 4,000 students and operates four elementary schools, a middle school, and a high school.

In 2009, the school district was rated "academically recognized" by the Texas Education Agency.

== Background ==
The school district's name comes from Calvin Joseph ("Cal") Allen (1859–1922), a prominent early rancher. Allen owned a 4,000-acre (16 km^{2}) cattle ranch on which the school district is now located. Allen donated land to the St. Louis, Brownsville and Mexico Rail Line as right-of-way; in exchange, the railroad agreed to place a depot on Allen's property. Allen then subdivided the land adjacent to the depot and established a townsite there. The town was named Calvin until it was discovered that another community in Texas already had that name. Founded in 1910, Calallen was annexed by the city of Corpus Christi in 1970.

Calallen had become its own school district because of a neighboring schoolhouse, Nuecestown School, losing their funding to another school in Corpus Christi. Calallen's first diploma was awarded in 1913 to Tom Bickham, and on August 28, 1928, the County Board met with Calallen and they approved the district to have a high school, Calallen High School.

== Schools ==
=== Secondary schools ===
- Calallen High School (Grades 9–12)
- Calallen Middle School (Grades 6–8)

=== Primary schools ===
- Wilma Magee Intermediate School (Grades 3–5)
- East Primary School (Grades Pre-K-2)
- Wood River Primary School (Grades Pre-K-2)
- West Intermediate (Grades 3–5)

== Dress and grooming codes ==
Students in primary , intermediate , and middle schools have to wear school uniforms .

Shirts must be white, blue, gray, or maroon polo shirts. CISD "spirit shirts" are also acceptable. Bottoms may be navy, khaki, or blue denim.

Students in Middle School (Grades 6–8) must wear ID badges around their neck.

In July 2024, the ACLU of Texas sent CISD a letter, alleging that the district's 2023-2024 dress and grooming code appeared to violate the Creating a Respectful and Open World for Natural Hair (or CROWN) Act, a Texas law which prohibits racial discrimination based on hairstyles or hair texture, and asking the district to revise its policies for the 2024-2025 school year.
