= Paloma Creek South, Texas =

Paloma Creek South
- Census-designated place
- Location within the state of Texas
- Coordinates: 33°12′36″N 96°55′58″W
- Country: United States
- State: Texas
- County: Denton

Area
  - Total: 0.89 sq mi (2.3 km^{2})
  - Land: 0.89 sq mi (2.3 km^{2})
  - Water: 0 sq mi (0.0 km^{2})
- Elevation: 564 ft (172 m)

Population (2020)
  - Total: 9,539
  - Density: 11,000/sq mi (4,100/km^{2})
- Time zone: UTC-6 (Central (CST))
  - Summer (DST): UTC-5 (CDT)
- ZIP codes: 76227, 75068
- Area codes: 214, 469, 945, 972
- GNIS feature ID: 2584711

Paloma Creek South is a census-designated place (CDP) in eastern Denton County, Texas, United States. It is part of the Paloma Creek master-planned community. As of the 2020 census, Paloma Creek South had a population of 9,539.

== Geography ==
Paloma Creek South is located south of U.S. Route 380 in an unincorporated area governed by the Denton County Fresh Water Supply Districts 8-A, 8-B, 11-A, 11-B, and 11-C.

== Demographics ==
Historical population
| Census | Pop. | Note | %± |
|---|---|---|---|
| 2010 | 2,753 | | — |
| 2020 | 9,539 | | 246.5% |
U.S. Decennial Census; 1850–1900 1910; 1920 1930 1940; 1950 1960 1970; 1980 1990 2000; 2010 2020

Paloma Creek South first appeared as a census designated place in the 2010 U.S. census.

Paloma Creek South CDP, Texas – Racial and ethnic composition Note: the US Census treats Hispanic/Latino as an ethnic category. This table excludes Latinos from the racial categories and assigns them to a separate category. Hispanics/Latinos may be of any race.
| Race / Ethnicity (NH = Non-Hispanic) | Pop 2010 | Pop 2020 | % 2010 | % 2020 |
|---|---|---|---|---|
| White alone (NH) | 1,589 | 3,876 | 57.72% | 40.63% |
| Black or African American alone (NH) | 563 | 3,026 | 20.45% | 31.72% |
| Native American or Alaska Native alone (NH) | 18 | 37 | 0.65% | 0.39% |
| Asian alone (NH) | 86 | 450 | 3.12% | 4.72% |
| Native Hawaiian or Pacific Islander alone (NH) | 1 | 5 | 0.04% | 0.05% |
| Other race alone (NH) | 1 | 73 | 0.04% | 0.77% |
| Mixed race or Multiracial (NH) | 55 | 512 | 2.00% | 5.37% |
| Hispanic or Latino (any race) | 440 | 1,560 | 15.98% | 16.35% |
| Total | 2,753 | 9,539 | 100.00% | 100.00% |

== Education ==
The entire Paloma Creek South census-designated place is within the Denton Independent School District. The CDP is zoned to Catherine Bell Elementary School and Dorothy Martinez Elementary School dependent on home address. Some students also attended Paloma Creek Elementary School prior to its 2026 retirement due to a combination of failing state test scores and declining enrollment. All of the CDP is zoned to Navo Middle School and Braswell High School.

Previously, the CDP was zoned to Providence Elementary School, Paloma Creek Elementary, Navo Middle School, and Denton High School.

Homes in the far southern area of the community south of Lake Meadow Ln, all not in the CDP, are located within the Little Elm Independent School District. They attend Lakeview Elementary School, Walker Middle School, and Little Elm High School.

The majority of Denton County, Paloma Creek South included, is in the boundary of North Central Texas College.

== See also ==
- Paloma Creek, Texas
