= Aubrey Independent School District =

School district in Texas

Address
- 415 Tisdell Lane Aubrey, Texas ESC Region 11
- Coordinates: 33°18′22″N 96°58′52″W

District information
- Type: Independent School District
- Grades: PK-12
- Established: 1966
- Superintendent: Dr. Shannon Saylor
- Schools: 8
- NCES District ID: 4808910

Students and staff
- Students: 4,897 (2025-26)
- Athletic conference: UIL Class AAAA
- District mascot: Chaparrals
- Colors: Red, Navy, White

Other information
- Website: Aubrey ISD

Aubrey Independent School District (Aubrey ISD or AISD) is a public school district based in Aubrey, Texas, United States. Covering 46 square miles in Denton County, the district serves the cities of Aubrey and Krugerville, as well as portions of Cross Roads, Little Elm, and Providence Village.

As of 2026, the district operates one high school, two middle schools, 4 elementary schools, and a daycare. The district is currently a C-rated district by the Texas Education Agency (TEA).

== History ==
Aubrey ISD was formed in 1966 and operated out of a single school building for twenty years.

In 1986, Aubrey Elementary School was established with grades prekindergarten (PK) through 6. Aubrey High School (grades 9–12) and Aubrey Middle School (7–8) remained at the original campus. 6th grade moved from Aubrey Elementary to Aubrey MS in 1988.

A separate campus was opened for Aubrey HS in 1998, leaving the previous facility for Aubrey MS. A new Aubrey MS facility was opened in either 2003 or 2004.

In 2008, the district opened James A. Monaco Elementary School with grades PK-5. Aubrey Elementary was renamed H.L. Brockett Elementary School and served grades K-5.

Aubrey ISD underwent a grade reconfiguration in 2015, with 5th grade moving from the elementary level to Aubrey MS. This lasted until 2019, when 5th grade returned to the elementary schools.

In 2020, Jackie Fuller Elementary School opened with grades PK-5, with the prekindergarten program moving from Monaco Elementary. Pre-K was briefly expanded to Brockett Elementary for the 2023–2024 school year, but was removed after Pete & Myra West Elementary School opened with grades PK-5 in 2024.

2025 saw the opening of Owens Middle School. Aubrey MS was renamed McNabb Middle School to coincide with this change.

Looking ahead, Aubrey ISD is expected to open Marilyn Hampton Elementary School, named after a retired custodian who worked for the school district for 39 years in 2027, followed by Elementary School #6 at a later date.

== Academic achievement ==
Historical district TEA accountability ratings

- 2026: C - 77
- 2025: B - 80
- 2024: B - 81
- 2023: B - 83
- 2022: B - 89
- 2021: No rating due to COVID-19
- 2020: No rating due to COVID-19
- 2019: A - 90
- 2018: B - 87
- 2017: Met Standard
- 2016: Met Standard
- 2015: Met Standard
- 2014: Met Standard
- 2013: Met Standard
- 2012: No rating given due to change in ratings system
- 2011: Recognized
- 2010: Recognized
- 2009: Recognized
- 2008: Recognized
- 2007: Academically Acceptable
- 2006: Academically Acceptable
- 2005: Academically Acceptable
- 2004: Recognized

== Schools ==
Secondary schools
Name	Grades	Established	Additional information
Aubrey High School	9-12	1966	
McNabb Middle School	6-8	1998	Formerly Aubrey MS (1998–2025); Moved to current campus around 2003 or 2004.
Owens Middle School	6-8	2025	

Primary schools
Name	Grades	Established	Additional information
H.L. Brockett Elementary	K-5	1986	Formerly Aubrey Elementary (1986–2008)
Jackie Fuller Elementary	PK-5	2020	
James A. Monaco Elementary	K-5	2008	
Pete & Myra West Elementary	PK-5	2024	
Early Bird Learning Center	Daycare	Unknown	Ages 6 weeks to 6 years; Priority is given to children and grandchildren of AISD employees.

Future schools
Name	Grades	Scheduled opening	Additional information
Marilyn Hampton Elementary School	PK-5	2027	
Elementary School #6			

== See also ==
- List of school districts in Texas
- List of high schools in Texas
