= Billy Ryan High School =

Public high school in Denton, Texas

Location
- 5101 East McKinney Street; Denton, Texas 76208; United States; 33.2114°N 97.0758°W

Information
- School type: Public high school
- Motto: Home of Champions
- Established: 1991
- School district: Denton Independent School District
- Principal: Vernon Reeves
- Faculty: 151
- Grades: 9–12
- Enrollment: 2,156 (2023–2024)
- Campus type: Suburban
- Colors: Red and blue
- Mascot: Raiders
- Newspaper: The Raider Review
- Website: Billy Ryan High School Homepage

Billy Ryan High School (Ryan or RHS) is a public high school located in east Denton, Texas. It is the second high school of the Denton Independent School District and classified as a 5A school by the UIL. The original building for the school was built in 1991 and was followed with expansions in 1994, 2006, 2008/2009, and 2022 that added more space for the pre-existing technology and fine arts programs.

== Attendance boundary ==
Its boundary includes sections of Denton, most of Shady Shores, and a section of Corinth.

Previously the boundary included, in addition to the above: Lincoln Park, much of Cross Roads, and sections of Little Elm, Oak Point, Paloma Creek, and Savannah.

== Athletics ==
Sports played at Ryan include:

=== Football ===
Ryan won state championships in 2001 and 2002 and played in four straight title games from 2000 to 2003. There are currently two freshmen teams (Red and Blue), two junior varsity teams (Red and Blue), and one varsity team.

The football team annually competes in a rivalry football match against district rival, Guyer High School, called the "Crosstown Showdown".

In 2019, Ryan advanced to the 5A Division 1 championship game where they lost to Shadow Creek High School 22-28.

In January 2021, The Ryan Raiders won the football 5A state championship against Cedar Park High School.

=== Softball ===
The Lady Raiders were district champions in 2007 and made an appearance at the state title game the same season. Both titles were firsts for the team. The Lady Raiders softball team plays at Tina Minke Field on the Ryan High campus.

=== Other sports ===
- Baseball
- Track and field
- Volleyball
- Tennis
- Basketball
- Swimming and diving
- Water polo
- Golf
- Cross country
- Soccer

=== State titles ===
- Boys Basketball
  - 2000(4A)
- Football
  - 2001(4A/D1), 2002(4A/D2)

Football 2020-2021(5A/D1)

- Girls Basketball
  - 2025(5A/D1); 2026(5A/D1)

=== State finalist ===
- Football
  - 2000(4A/D1), 2003(4A/D2), 2010(4A/D1), 2019(5A/D1)

== Notable alumni ==
- Brian Smith – class of 2002 – former NFL player (Jacksonville Jaguars)
- Jarvis Moss – class of 2003 – former NFL player (Denver Broncos, Oakland Raiders)
- Javy Guerra – class of 2004 – former Major League Baseball pitcher (Chicago White Sox, Los Angeles Dodgers, Los Angeles Angels, Miami Marlins)
- Austin Jackson – class of 2005 – former MLB outfielder (Seattle Mariners, New York Yankees, Detroit Tigers, Chicago Cubs, Chicago White Sox, Cleveland Indians, Texas Rangers)
- Kelly Kraft – class of 2007 – professional golfer
- Mario Edwards Jr. – class of 2012 – NFL player (Houston Texans)
- Earnest Brown IV – class of 2017 – NFL player (Dallas Cowboys)
- Derek Lokey – class of 2004 – former NFL player (Kansas City Chiefs)
- Bud Sasser – class of 2010 – former NFL player (St. Louis Rams)
- Emani Bailey – class of 2020 – NFL player (Carolina Panthers)
- Drew Sanders – class of 2020 – NFL player (Denver Broncos)
- Seth Henigan – class of 2021 – quarterback for the Memphis Tigers
- Ja'Tavion Sanders – class of 2021 – NFL player (Carolina Panthers)
- Billy Bowman Jr. – class of 2021 – NFL player (Atlanta Falcons)
- Anthony Hill Jr. – class of 2023 – linebacker for the Tennessee Titans
- Ty Haywood – class of 2025 – offensive tackle for the Michigan Wolverines
