= Pilot Point High School =

Location
- 1300 N. Washington Street; Pilot Point, Texas 76258; United States; 33.41082°N 96.94774°W

Information
- School type: Public high school
- School district: Pilot Point Independent School District
- Principal: Marzia Infante
- Teaching staff: 36.93 (FTE)
- Grades: 9-12
- Enrollment: 457 (2023-2024)
- Student to teacher ratio: 12.37
- Colors: Orange & Black
- Athletics conference: UIL Class 3A
- Mascot: Bearcat
- Website: Pilot Point High School

Pilot Point High School is a public high school located in the city of Pilot Point, Texas and classified as a 3A school by the UIL. It is a part of the Pilot Point Independent School District located in northeast Denton County. In 2013, the school was rated "Met Standard" by the Texas Education Agency.

== The Mighty Bearcat Band ==
The Bearcat band has made it to area finals and went to state in 2021.

== Athletics ==
The Pilot Point Bearcats compete in these sports

Volleyball, Cross Country, Football, Basketball, Powerlifting, Golf, Tennis, Track, Baseball & Softball

=== State Titles ===
- Football
  - 1980(2A)^ 1981(2A), 2009(2A)
- Softball
  - 2013(2A)

^ co-champions

== Notable alumni ==
- G.A. Moore - Class of 1957 - Texas High School Football's most winning coach with a record of 422-86-9. He not only graduated from Pilot Point but coached the Bearcats in 3 different stints (1963-1970, 1977-1985, and 2002-2004)
- Colt Knost - Class of 2003 - PGA Golfer, won the Texas Class 3A State Championship his Sr. Year of H.S. and played at Southern Methodist University where he was All Conference and won Western Athletic Conference Freshman of the Year in 2004. In 2007 he won the U.S. Amateur Public Links championship and was the inaugural winner of the *Mark H. McCormack Medal by The Royal and Ancient Golf Club at St. Andrew's for the amateur player.
- Joe Exotic - Class of 1982 - Former owner of the Greater Wynnewood Exotic Animal Park and star of the popular Netflix documentary Tiger King.
- Sterling Jones - Class of 1999 - Actor Lone Survivor and Greys Anatomy
