= Pilot Point Independent School District =

School district in Texas

Address
- 829 South Harrison Street Pilot Point, Texas ESC Region 11
- Coordinates: 33°23′23″N 97°3′19″W

District information
- Type: Independent School District
- Motto: "Dedicated to Excellence"
- Grades: PK-12
- Superintendent: Dr. Shannon Fuller
- Governing agency: Texes Education Agency
- Schools: 4
- NCES District ID: 4834920

Students and staff
- Students: 1,735 (2025-2026)
- Athletic conference: UIL Class AAA
- District mascot: Bearcats
- Colors: Orange, Black, White

Other information
- Website: www.pilotpointisd.com

Pilot Point Independent School District (PPISD) is a public school district based in Pilot Point, Texas, United States. Covering 125 square miles, the district is mostly located in Denton County, with portions extending into Cooke and Grayson Counties.

As of 2026, Pilot Point ISD operates one high school, one middle school, and two primary schools. The district is currently a C-rated district by the Texas Education Agency.

== History ==
When Pilot Point ISD was established is unclear, but Pilot Point High School's Gee campus was built in 1951. In 1972, a new PPHS campus was built and named after J Earl Selz High School, and the Gee campus continued educating the lower grades.

By 1984, the high school operated with grades 9 through 12 and the Gee campus housed the junior high and elementary grades: Pilot Point Junior High School (grades 6-8) and Gee Elementary School (prekindergarten-grade 5).

In 1986, Pilot Point Elementary School opened with prekindergarten-grade 4. Now a stand-alone facility, the junior high was renamed to Gee Junior High and served grades 5-8; 5th grade was moved there in 1989.

When the current Pilot Point High School facility was opened in 1999, the J Earl Selz building became Pilot Point Middle School (PPMS) with grades 6-8. The former junior high became Gee Intermediate School, serving grades 3-5, and leaving onprekindergarten-grade 2 at the elementary school.

Pilot Point Intermediate School (grades 3-6) opened in 2005, replacing the Gee campus, and the district removed grade 6 from PPMS.

In 2021, PPISD underwent another grade configuration and renamed its elementary campuses. Pilot Point Intermediate became Pilot Point Elementary School (grades 1-5) and the old elementary school became Pilot Point Early Childhood Center (prekindergarten and kindergarten); 6th grade returned to PPMS.

In May 2026, Pilot Point ISD attempted to pass a $295 million school bond to fund a new high school, new elementary school, and upgrade other campuses. The bond failed by a margin of 61% against and 39% for.

== Academic achievement ==
Historical district TEA accountability ratings

- 2026: C - 77
- 2025: C - 77
- 2024: C - 78
- 2023: C - 76
- 2022: B - 87
- 2021: No rating given due to COVID-19
- 2020: No rating given due to COVID-19
- 2019: B - 87
- 2018: C - 79
- 2017: Met Standard
- 2016: Met Standard
- 2015: Met Standard
- 2014: Met Standard
- 2013: Met Standard
- 2012: No rating given due to change in ratings system
- 2011: Recognized
- 2010: Recognized
- 2009: Academically Acceptable
- 2008: Academically Acceptable
- 2007: Academically Acceptable
- 2006: Academically Acceptable
- 2005: Academically Acceptable
- 2004: Academically Acceptable

== Schools ==
Schools (grades 9-12)
Name	Grades	Additional information
Pilot Point High School	9-12	
Pilot Point Middle School	6-8	
Pilot Point Elementary School	1-5	
Pilot Point Early Childhood Center	PK-K	
