= Savannah, Texas =

- Census-designated place
- Location within the state of Texas
- Coordinates: 33°13′33″N 96°54′29″W
- Country: United States
- State: Texas
- County: Denton

Area
  - Total: 0.93 sq mi (2.4 km^{2})
  - Land: 0.93 sq mi (2.4 km^{2})
  - Water: 0 sq mi (0.0 km^{2})
- Elevation: 584 ft (178 m)

Population (2010)
  - Total: 3,318
  - Density: 3,600/sq mi (1,400/km^{2})
- Time zone: UTC-6 (Central (CST))
  - Summer (DST): UTC-5 (CDT)
- ZIP code: 76227
- Area codes: 214, 469, 945, 972
- GNIS feature ID: 2584739
- Website: www.savannahdfw.com

Savannah is a census-designated place east of Denton in Denton County, Texas, United States. The community is a housing subdivision marketed by Huffines Communities and is located entirely within the boundaries of Elm Ridge WCID. As of the 2020 census, Savannah had a population of 6,529.

== Geography ==
Savannah is located on the north side of U.S. Route 380 in an unincorporated area of Denton County, 12 miles (19 km) east of Denton and 15 miles (24 km) west of McKinney. It is bordered to the south by land within the town of Little Elm and east within the city of Prosper.

== Demographics ==
Historical population
Census	Pop.	Note	%±
2010	3,318		—
2020	6,529		96.8%
U.S. Decennial Census; 1850–1900 1910; 1920 1930 1940; 1950 1960 1970; 1980 1990 2000; 2010 2020

Savannah first appeared as a census designated place in the 2010 U.S. census.

Savannah CDP, Texas – Racial and ethnic composition Note: the US Census treats Hispanic/Latino as an ethnic category. This table excludes Latinos from the racial categories and assigns them to a separate category. Hispanics/Latinos may be of any race.
Race / Ethnicity (NH = Non-Hispanic)	Pop 2010	Pop 2020	% 2010	% 2020
White alone (NH)	2,415	3,677	72.78%	56.32%
Black or African American alone (NH)	294	1,064	8.86%	16.30%
Native American or Alaska Native alone (NH)	22	15	0.66%	0.23%
Asian alone (NH)	65	253	1.96%	3.88%
Native Hawaiian or Pacific Islander alone (NH)	0	6	0.00%	0.09%
Other race alone (NH)	7	54	0.21%	0.83%
Mixed race or Multiracial (NH)	88	404	2.65%	6.19%
Hispanic or Latino (any race)	427	1,056	12.87%	16.17%
Total	3,318	6,529	100.00%	100.00%

== Education ==
Savannah is served by the Denton Independent School District. Education is accomplished by Savannah Elementary School (grades K-5) within the subdivision; Cheek Middle School (grades 6-8), and Braswell High School.

Previously, it was split between the boundaries of Denton High School (grades 9-12) and Denton Ryan High School (grades 9-12). A new high school opened in the fall of 2016 closer to the subdivision. The typical resident has at least a 12th-grade education, and most are college graduates.

The majority of Denton County, Savannah included, is in the boundary of North Central Texas College.
