= Lincoln Park, Texas =

- Former Town
- Location of Lincoln Park in Denton County, Texas
- Coordinates: 33°13′27″N 96°58′22″W
- Country: United States
- State: Texas
- County: Denton

Area
  - Total: 0.15 sq mi (0.4 km^{2})
  - Land: 0.15 sq mi (0.4 km^{2})
  - Water: 0 sq mi (0.0 km^{2})
- Elevation: 600 ft (180 m)

Population (2010)
  - Total: 308
  - Density: 2,000/sq mi (770/km^{2})
- Time zone: UTC-6 (Central (CST))
  - Summer (DST): UTC-5 (CDT)
- FIPS code: 48-42808
- GNIS feature ID: 2412898

Lincoln Park was a town in Denton County, Texas, United States. The population was 308 at the 2010 census.

The history of Lincoln Park, through its dissolution, included a single trailer park.

== History ==
Lincoln Park is one of several towns that incorporated in Denton County in the early 1970s to sell alcohol in this otherwise dry county. Incorporated in 1971, Lincoln Park served the Denton to McKinney corridor of U.S. Highway 380, supplying both college students from Denton and travelers passing through with drinks. After both Denton and McKinney voted to allow alcoholic sales in their cities, Lincoln Park began to decline. Previously it consisted of the original mobile home park, a liquor store and a Trail Dust Steak House restaurant.

Due to the land being sold for redevelopment to Centurion American Development, on March 29, 2015, the Trail Dust Steakhouse closed permanently and has been leveled. Also on the same day residents of Lincoln Park were notified that the land was also sold for redevelopment with all residents having to leave or relocate their homes before the end of June. The mobile home park has since been vacated.

Little Elm struck a deal with an arm of Centurion American Development, a mega-developer that has built everything from high-rises to master-planned, vastly upscale residential enclaves.

In 2014, Centurion made a deal with Nathaniel Parker III, father of Tan Parker (Texas House of Representatives) to purchase the acreage in and around Lincoln Park, one of the state's fastest growing areas. Little Elm then annexed Lincoln Park in an acrimonious and legally disputed maneuver in April.

== Geography ==
According to the United States Census Bureau, the town has a total area of 0.2 square miles (0.52 km^{2}), all land.

== Demographics ==
Historical population
Census	Pop.	Note	%±
1980	39		—
1990	287		635.9%
2000	517		80.1%
2010	308		−40.4%
2019 (est.)	558		81.2%
U.S. Decennial Census

As of the census of 2000, there were 517 people, 183 households, and 137 families residing in the town. The population density was 3,392.4 inhabitants per square mile (1,309.8/km^{2}). There were 202 housing units at an average density of 1,325.5 per square mile (511.8/km^{2}). The racial makeup of the town was 85.49% White, 0.77% African American, 1.35% Native American, 0.19% Asian, 11.41% from other races, and 0.77% from two or more races. Hispanic or Latino of any race were 17.41% of the population.

There were 183 households, out of which 47.5% had children under the age of 18 living with them, 56.3% were married couples living together, 10.4% had a female householder with no husband present, and 25.1% were non-families. 17.5% of all households were made up of individuals, and 2.2% had someone living alone who was 65 years of age or older. The average household size was 2.83 and the average family size was 3.19.

In the town, the population was spread out, with 29.8% under the age of 18, 15.5% from 18 to 24, 38.7% from 25 to 44, 13.3% from 45 to 64, and 2.7% who were 65 years of age or older. The median age was 27 years. For every 100 females, there were 97.3 males. For every 100 females age 18 and over, there were 98.4 males.

The median income for a household in the town was $40,000, and the median income for a family was $41,429. Males had a median income of $28,750 versus $23,281 for females. The per capita income for the town was $13,801. About 12.3% of families and 21.3% of the population were below the poverty line, including 29.0% of those under age 18 and 9.1% of those age 65 or over.

== Education ==
The former Lincoln Park is served by the Denton Independent School District.

The former Lincoln Park is zoned to Providence Elementary School, Rodriguez Middle School, and Braswell High School.

When the trailer park existed, it was zoned to Providence Elementary, Navo Middle School, and Ryan High School.
