= Denton High School =

Location
- 3001 Bronco Wy; Denton, Texas 76207; United States; 33°15′02″N 97°09′58″W

Information
- Type: High School
- Motto: Dedication, Honor, Success... We are DHS!
- Established: 1884
- School district: Denton Independent School District
- Principal: Joel Hays
- Faculty: 152.30 (FTE)
- Grades: 9-12
- Enrollment: 2,054 (2023-2024)
- Student to teacher ratio: 13.49
- Campus type: Suburban
- Colors: Purple and gold
- Mascot: Broncos
- Newspaper: The Horseshoe
- Yearbook: The Bronco
- Website: Denton High School

Denton High School is a public high school located in the city of Denton, Texas and classified as a 5A school by the UIL. It is a part of the Denton Independent School District located in central Denton County and was the original high school for Denton.

Denton High School was established in 1884. In 1910 it moved to what is now Calhoun Middle School. In 1957 it moved again to Fulton Street. In the 1990s, DHS yielded grades 10–12 to the newly opened Ryan High School until 1995. In 2022, it was moved northwest to its current location on Bronco Way. In 2015, the school was rated "Met Standard" by the Texas Education Agency.

After voters approved a May 2018 Capital Improvement Plan, Denton ISD purchased land to rebuild Denton High School at a new location and expand the school's campus from 35 acres to 150 acres. The site is near the University of North Texas Discovery Park, less than 1.5 miles from the Denton High location at 1007 Fulton Street.

== Attendance boundary ==
Its boundary includes sections of Denton. Previously the boundary included Paloma Creek South and sections of Paloma Creek and Savannah, and small sections of Cross Roads, Little Elm, and Prosper.

== Athletics ==
The schools teams are called the Denton Broncos.

=== State Titles ===
Denton (UIL)

- Boys Basketball
  - 1930(All), 1935(All)
- Girls Soccer
  - 2003(4A)
  - 2004(4A)
- Girls Golf
  - 1984(5A) Buffy Klein
- Boys Swimming
  - 1981(All) Chuck Ponthier (50-Yard Freestyle)
- Boys Cross Country
  - 2020 State 3rd Place (5A)
  - 2021 State Runner Up (5A)
- Boys Track
  - 1983 (5A) Keith Stubblefield (100-Meter Dash)
  - 2026 (5A) 4x200-Meter Relay (Sylvester Sims, O'Ryan Croaker, Omar Penaloza, Markell Jennings)

== Alumni ==
- Mario Bennett: basketball player
- Mark Behning: American football player
- Brandon Coleman: American football player
- Aaron Graham: American football player
- Phil Armour: American football player
- Phyllis George: Miss America & journalist
- Shirley Cothran: Miss America
- Tim Duryea, basketball coach
- Nancy Gates: actress
- Lynn Harrell: cellist
- Herman Johnson: American football player
- John Lott: American football player
- Jordan Malone: skater
- Tim Tadlock: baseball coach
- Louise Tobin: jazz singer
- Skip Johnson: baseball coach
- John Nelson: baseball player
- Hunter Dozier: baseball player
- David Robinson: U.S. Navy vice admiral
- Ann Sheridan: actress
- Don Woods: American football player
