= Braswell High School =

Coordinates: 33.219630°N 96.927467°W

Dr. Ray Braswell High School

Location
- 26750 E. University Dr. Little Elm, Texas 76227; United States

Information
- School type: Public high school
- Established: 2016
- School district: Denton Independent School District
- Principal: Decorian Hailey
- Staff: 179.83 (FTE)
- Grades: 9-12
- Enrollment: 2,758 (2023-2024)
- Student to teacher ratio: 15.34
- Campus type: Suburban
- Colors: Red & Black
- Athletics conference: UIL Class 6A
- Mascot: Bengal
- Rival: Little Elm High School Guyer High School
- Website: Braswell High School

Dr. Ray Braswell High School is a senior high school in northeastern Little Elm, Texas. It is a part of the Denton Independent School District.

Areas in its attendance boundary includes the census-designated places of Paloma Creek, Paloma Creek South, and Savannah. It also includes portions of Aubrey, Cross Roads, Little Elm, Oak Point, and Providence Village. It serves the area of the former Lincoln Park, and Cross Oak Ranch.

It is the district's easternmost high school, and is the first to be opened outside of the city of Denton's boundaries.

== History ==
In 2013, Denton ISD area voters would approve a $312 million bond package, which would include the construction of a 4th comprehensive high school that would relieve overcapacity in the current 3 high schools, with the school being built in the "380 corridor", typically known as parts of Paloma Creek, Cross Roads, and Little Elm areas of US-380 east of the Elm Fork.

Dr. Leslie Guajardo was selected as the school's first principal. It was the fourth comprehensive high school to be built in Denton ISD. The campus, with 532,000 square feet (49,400 m^{2}) of space, had a cost of $113.9 million. It opened in fall 2016. The Denton Independent School District has named DeCorian Haliey principal for the 2020–2024 school years.
