= Krugerville, Texas =

- City
- Motto: A city of neighborly warmth
- Location of Krugerville in Denton County, Texas
- Coordinates: 33°16′52″N 96°59′37″W
- Country: United States
- State: Texas
- County: Denton

Area
  - Total: 1.32 sq mi (3.42 km^{2})
  - Land: 1.32 sq mi (3.42 km^{2})
  - Water: 0 sq mi (0.00 km^{2})
- Elevation: 682 ft (208 m)

Population (2020)
  - Total: 1,766
  - Density: 1,389.7/sq mi (536.55/km^{2})
- Time zone: UTC-6 (Central (CST))
  - Summer (DST): UTC-5 (CDT)
- ZIP code: 76227
- Area code: 940
- FIPS code: 48-39916
- GNIS feature ID: 2411561
- Website: www.krugerville.org

Krugerville is a city in Denton County, Texas, United States. The population was 1,766 in 2020.

== Geography ==
According to the United States Census Bureau, the city has a total area of 1.3 square miles (3.4 km^{2}), all land.

== Demographics ==
Historical population
Census	Pop.	Note	%±
1980	469		—
1990	735		56.7%
2000	903		22.9%
2010	1,662		84.1%
2020	1,766		6.3%
U.S. Decennial Census

=== 2020 census ===
As of the 2020 census, Krugerville had a population of 1,766. The median age was 43.2 years. 23.4% of residents were under the age of 18 and 17.7% of residents were 65 years of age or older. For every 100 females there were 98.4 males, and for every 100 females age 18 and over there were 99.3 males age 18 and over. There were 446 families residing in the city.

98.4% of residents lived in urban areas, while 1.6% lived in rural areas.

There were 626 households in Krugerville, of which 37.2% had children under the age of 18 living in them. Of all households, 72.5% were married-couple households, 8.8% were households with a male householder and no spouse or partner present, and 13.4% were households with a female householder and no spouse or partner present. About 12.3% of all households were made up of individuals and 6.4% had someone living alone who was 65 years of age or older.

There were 644 housing units, of which 2.8% were vacant. The homeowner vacancy rate was 0.8% and the rental vacancy rate was 5.1%.

Racial composition as of the 2020 census (NH = Non-Hispanic) (Note: Note: the US Census treats Hispanic/Latino as an ethnic category. This table excludes Latinos from the racial categories and assigns them to a separate category. Hispanics/Latinos can be of any race.)
Race	Number	Percent
White	1,517	85.9%
Black or African American	14	0.8%
American Indian and Alaska Native	20	1.1%
Asian	15	0.8%
Native Hawaiian and Other Pacific Islander	2	0.1%
Some other race	40	2.3%
Two or more races	158	8.9%
Hispanic or Latino (of any race)	170	9.6%

== Education ==
The city of Krugerville is served by the Aubrey Independent School District.
