= Oak Point, Texas =

- City
- Motto: A Country Place
- Location of Oak Point in Denton County, Texas
- Coordinates: 33°10′56″N 96°59′43″W
- Country: United States
- State: Texas
- County: Denton

Government
  - Type: Council-Manager

Area
  - Total: 6.10 sq mi (15.80 km^{2})
  - Land: 5.79 sq mi (14.99 km^{2})
  - Water: 0.31 sq mi (0.81 km^{2})
- Elevation: 574 ft (175 m)

Population (2020)
  - Total: 4,357
  - Estimate (2025): 6,909
  - Density: 752.8/sq mi (290.7/km^{2})
- Time zone: UTC-6 (Central (CST))
  - Summer (DST): UTC-5 (CDT)
- ZIP code: 75068
- Area code: 972
- FIPS code: 48-53130
- GNIS feature ID: 2411289
- Website: www.oakpointtexas.com

Oak Point is a city in Denton County, Texas, United States. Ranked in the Top 20 of 62 suburbs in the Dallas area by D Magazine, Oak Point had a population of 4,357 at the 2020 census.

== Geography ==
Oak Point is located in east central Denton County in north-central Texas just south of U.S. Highway 380, equidistant between Denton and Frisco and approximately 40 miles (64 km) north of Dallas. While Oak Point, positioned on a scenic Lewisville Lake peninsula, provides a tranquil setting away from the pressures of a more urban environment, Oak Point is located just 10 miles (16 km) from the Dallas North Tollway, 7 miles (11 km) from Interstate 35E, and 25 miles (40 km) from the Dallas/Fort Worth International Airport.

Oak Point is located at 33°10′56″N 96°59′43″W (33.182353, –96.995192). According to the United States Census Bureau, the city has a total area of 5.9 square miles (15 km^{2}), of which 5.7 square miles (15 km^{2}) is land and 0.2 square miles (0.52 km^{2}), or 4.04%, is water.

== Demographics ==
Historical population
Census	Pop.	Note	%±
1980	387		—
1990	645		66.7%
2000	1,747		170.9%
2010	2,786		59.5%
2020	4,357		56.4%
2025 (est.)	6,909		58.6%
U.S. Decennial Census; 2020 Census

=== 2020 census ===
As of the 2020 census, Oak Point had a population of 4,357 and a median age of 40.3 years; 22.5% of residents were under the age of 18 and 13.7% were 65 years of age or older. For every 100 females there were 94.7 males, and for every 100 females age 18 and over there were 94.6 males age 18 and over. There were nearly 300 veterans living in the city in 2020.

83.5% of residents lived in urban areas, while 16.5% lived in rural areas.

There were 1,560 households in Oak Point, of which 36.5% had children under the age of 18 living in them. Of all households, 69.0% were married-couple households, 10.8% were households with a male householder and no spouse or partner present, and 14.4% were households with a female householder and no spouse or partner present. About 13.4% of all households were made up of individuals and 3.5% had someone living alone who was 65 years of age or older. The average household size was 2.66 persons.

There were 1,642 housing units, of which 5.0% were vacant. The homeowner vacancy rate was 1.5% and the rental vacancy rate was 7.1%. Approximately 84.3% of housing units were owner occupied.

Racial composition as of the 2020 census
Race	Number	Percent
White	3,122	71.7%
Black or African American	306	7.0%
American Indian and Alaska Native	38	0.9%
Asian	90	2.1%
Native Hawaiian and Other Pacific Islander	2	0.0%
Some other race	231	5.3%
Two or more races	568	13.0%
Hispanic or Latino (of any race)	741	17.0%

== Government and infrastructure ==
The City of Oak Point was incorporated as a general law municipality in 1976. The City of Oak Point adopted the Council-Manager form of government through an election in May 2001. The Council-Manager form of government is a very common form of government in Texas. Under this form of government, the City Council employs a professional trained city manager to implement the policies, contracts, and agreements that are approved by the City Council. The City Manager is also responsible for managing the daily operations of the City and for implementing the City's budget.

In November 2022, the new City Charter was approved overwhelmingly by the residents and the city changed to charter-based Home Rule form of city government. The new Charter keeps the City Manager form of government and adds a councilperson, for a total of 6 councilpersons. All councilpersons are elected at large, as well as the Mayor. The Mayor has full voting rights (cannot make or second motions), so as to provide full accountability. Terms are for 2 years, with staggered elections each year in May.

== Education ==
The City of Oak Point is served by the Little Elm and Denton Independent School Districts.

Little Elm ISD residents are zoned to Oak Point Elementary School. Since 2020, said residents are zoned to Walker Middle School. Prior to 2020 these residents were zoned to Lakeside Middle School. All LEISD residents are zoned to Little Elm High School.

Providence Elementary School serves most of Denton ISD Oak Point, while a section is zoned to Cross Oaks Elementary School. All of the Denton ISD portion is zoned to Rodriguez Middle School, and Braswell High School.

The majority of Denton County, Oak Point included, is in the boundary of North Central Texas College.
