= Aubrey, Texas =

- City
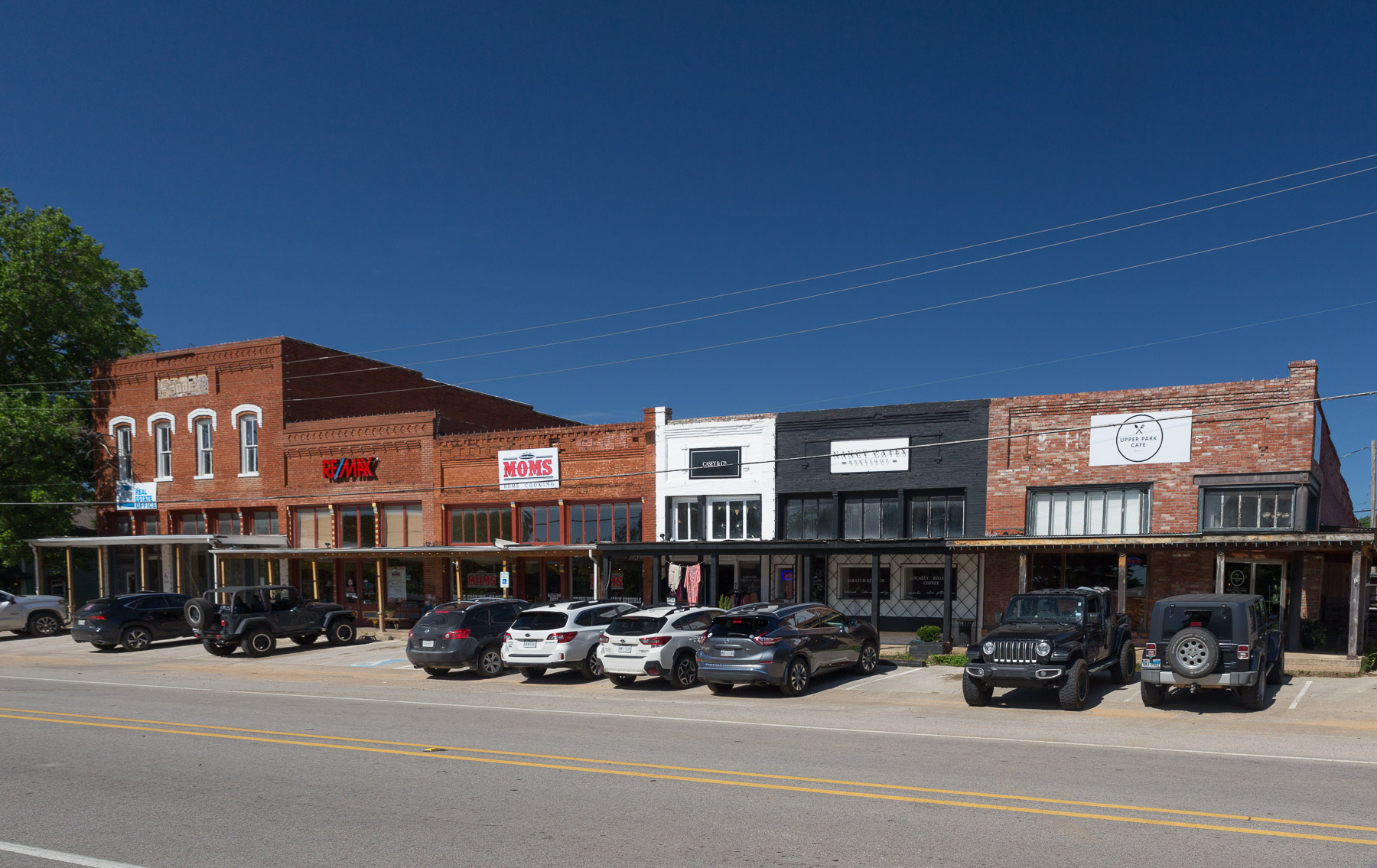
- Downtown
- Nicknames: Horse Country, U.S.A.
- Interactive map of Aubrey, Texas
- Coordinates: 33°18′26″N 96°59′2″W
- Country: United States
- State: Texas
- County: Denton

Area
  - Total: 3.02 sq mi (7.82 km^{2})
  - Land: 3.01 sq mi (7.79 km^{2})
  - Water: 0.012 sq mi (0.03 km^{2})
- Elevation: 676 ft (206 m)

Population (2020)
  - Total: 5,006
  - Estimate (2025): 9,066
  - Density: 1,627.1/sq mi (628.24/km^{2})
- Time zone: UTC-6 (Central (CST))
  - Summer (DST): UTC-5 (CDT)
- ZIP code: 76227
- Area code: 940
- FIPS code: 48-04600
- GNIS feature ID: 2409753
- Website: www.aubreytx.gov

Aubrey is a city in Denton County, Texas, United States. Its population was 5,006 at the 2020 census.

== History ==
Aubrey, the town, was officially founded in 1867, when Civil War veteran Lemuel Noah Edwards (1838–1910) built the second frame house there. Edwards eventually gave each of his 10 children a lot on which to build a home. The Edwards family was instrumental in several civil developments. Dancing was not allowed, but the townspeople often gathered in the Edwards home for singing and listening to music performed on an organ that Edwards had imported.

In 1881, the Texas and Pacific Railway completed a track and station in Aubrey and commenced operations.

In 1885, Edwards offered a lot to each congregation that would build a church within a year. In 1882, Edwards and Louis Caddel Sr. donated land for a one-room schoolhouse in town. Edwards, through one of his daughters—Edna Mae Edwards (1884–1975), who married Hugh Tobin (1884–1929)—was the grandfather of Louise Tobin, a prolific big-band jazz vocalist who attained national acclaim in 1932.

Eventually, Aubrey became known for the peanut farms that surrounded the town. By 2009, horse ranches surrounded Aubrey. Around that time, houses were constructed in Aubrey, replacing the grounds of the old peanut farms.

== Geography ==
Aubrey is 12 miles (19 km) north of Denton. According to the United States Census Bureau, the city has a total area of 2.6 square miles (6.8 km^{2}), of which 0.019 square miles (0.05 km^{2}), or 0.73%, is covered by water.

== Demographics ==
Historical population
Census	Pop.	Note	%±
1930	439		—
1940	472		7.5%
1950	491		4.0%
1960	534		8.8%
1970	731		36.9%
1980	948		29.7%
1990	1,138		20.0%
2000	1,500		31.8%
2010	2,595		73.0%
2020	5,006		92.9%
2025 (est.)	9,066		81.1%
U.S. Decennial Census

Aubrey racial and ethnic composition as of 2020 (NH = Non-Hispanic) (Note: Note: the US Census treats Hispanic/Latino as an ethnic category. This table excludes Latinos from the racial categories and assigns them to a separate category. Hispanics/Latinos can be of any race.)
Race	Number	Percentage
White (NH)	3,274	65.4%
Black or African American (NH)	449	8.97%
Native American or Alaska Native (NH)	32	0.64%
Asian (NH)	74	1.48%
Pacific Islander (NH)	3	0.06%
Some other race (NH)	12	0.24%
Mixed/multiracial (NH)	248	4.95%
Hispanic or Latino	914	18.26%
Total	5,006	

=== 2020 census ===
As of the 2020 census, Aubrey had a population of 5,006, 1,844 households, and 1,046 families. The median age was 32.8 years; 27.0% of residents were under the age of 18 and 9.7% of residents were 65 years of age or older. For every 100 females there were 89.8 males, and for every 100 females age 18 and over there were 86.1 males age 18 and over.

97.8% of residents lived in urban areas, while 2.2% lived in rural areas.

There were 1,844 households in Aubrey, of which 41.5% had children under the age of 18 living in them. Of all households, 54.3% were married-couple households, 13.4% were households with a male householder and no spouse or partner present, and 23.8% were households with a female householder and no spouse or partner present. About 18.6% of all households were made up of individuals and 6.2% had someone living alone who was 65 years of age or older.

There were 1,982 housing units, of which 7.0% were vacant. Among occupied housing units, 74.6% were owner-occupied and 25.4% were renter-occupied. The homeowner vacancy rate was 4.4% and the rental vacancy rate was 5.1%.

Racial composition as of the 2020 census
Race	Percent
White	70.0%
Black or African American	9.1%
American Indian and Alaska Native	1.1%
Asian	1.7%
Native Hawaiian and Other Pacific Islander	0.1%
Some other race	6.6%
Two or more races	11.5%
Hispanic or Latino (of any race)	18.3%

=== 2000 census ===
As of the 2000 census, 1,500 people, 559 households, and 418 families were residing in the city. The population density was 720.4 inhabitants per square mile (278.1/km^{2}). The 597 housing units had an average density of 286.7 per square mile (110.7/km^{2}).

In 2000, the racial makeup of the city was 92.5% White, 0.5% African American, 0.7% Native American, 0.5% Asian, 4.7% some other race, and 1.1% from two or more races. Hispanics or Latinos of any race were 6.7% of the population.

== Education ==
Aubrey is served by the Aubrey Independent School District. The Aubrey High School mascot is the chaparral (roadrunner). A new intermediate school was completed in 2005 and now houses the middle school as of 2008. A new elementary school was completed and Aubrey Elementary School was renamed Brockett Elementary School in 2008. The old middle school building now houses the district's administration offices.

Braswell High School of the Denton Independent School District is south of Aubrey and serves some areas with "Aubrey, Texas" addresses; they are not in the Aubrey city limits.

== Culture ==
Starr's Service Station, located off Sherman Drive and across the street from the Ever After Chapel, previously served as a social center for Aubrey. However, Starr's Service Station was sold and no longer functions as a social center.

== Notable person ==
- Louise Tobin, big-band vocalist and first wife of Harry James
