= Pilot Point, Texas =

- City
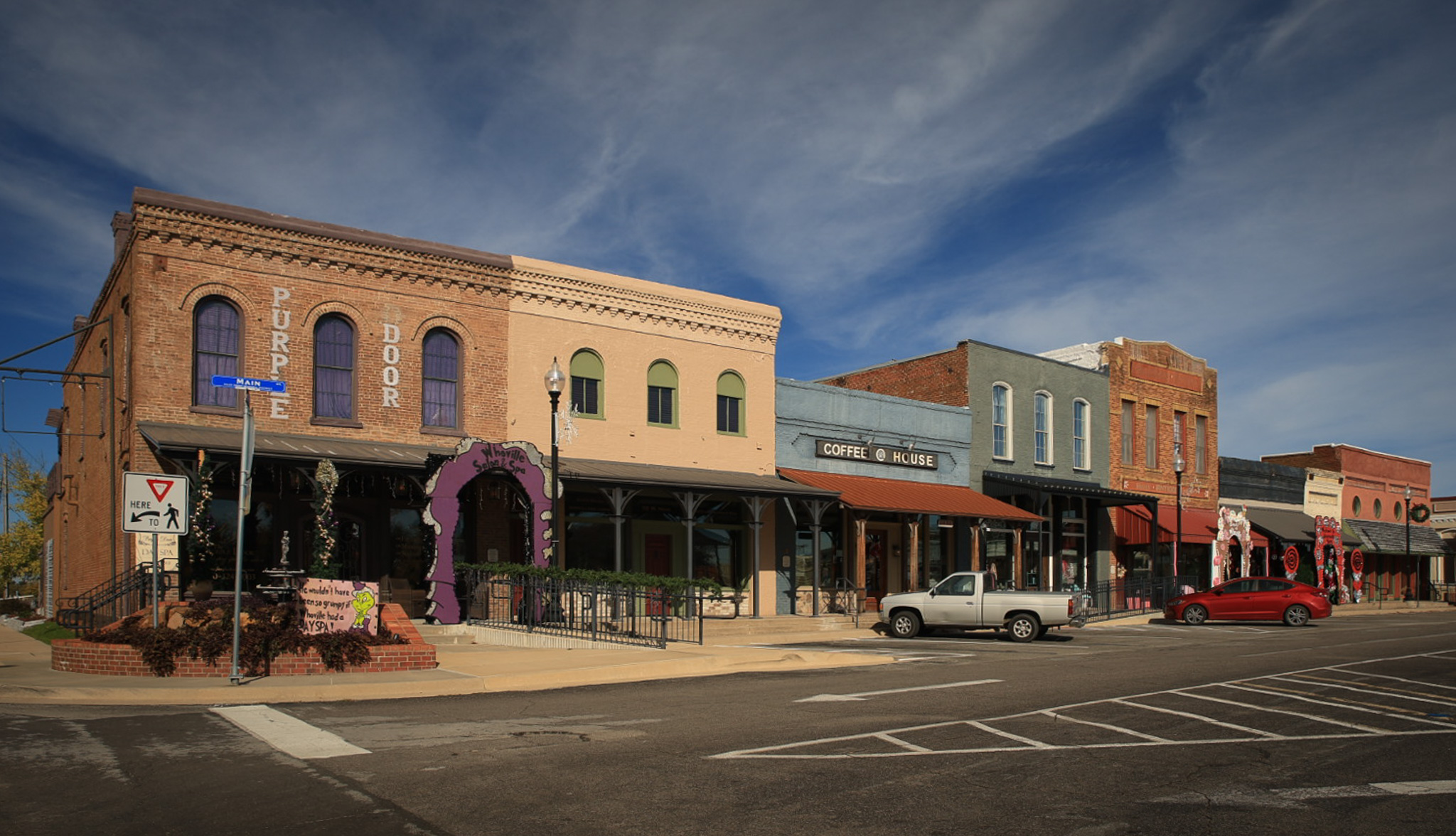
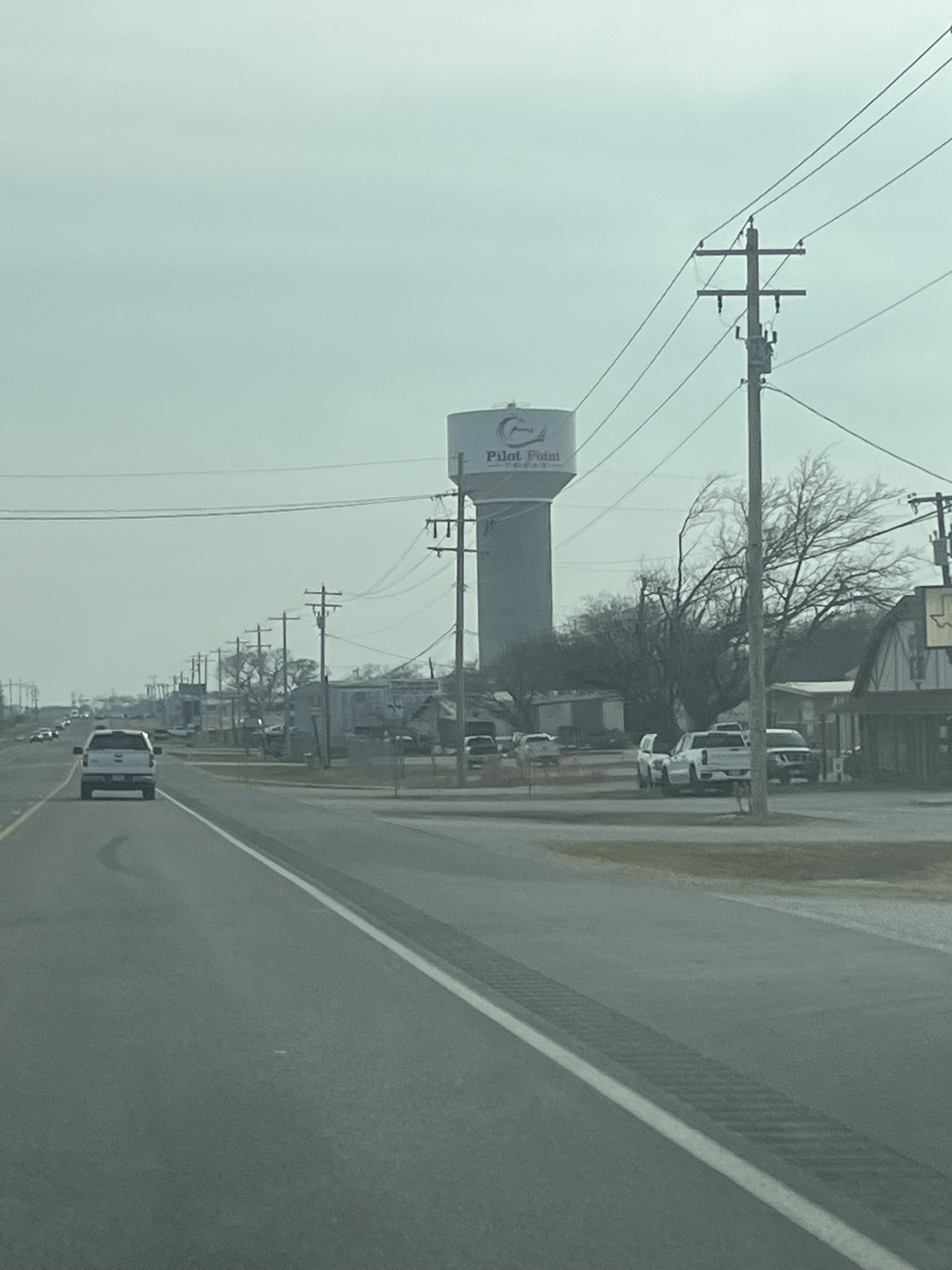
- Pilot Point Commercial Historic District (2023) Pilot Point Water tower (2026)
- Motto: Pointing the way since 1845
- Location of Pilot Point in Denton County, Texas
- Coordinates: 33°23′47″N 96°57′31″W
- Country: United States
- State: Texas
- County: Denton

Area
  - Total: 4.35 sq mi (11.27 km^{2})
  - Land: 4.35 sq mi (11.26 km^{2})
  - Water: 0.0039 sq mi (0.01 km^{2})
- Elevation: 696 ft (212 m)

Population (2020)
  - Total: 4,381
  - Estimate (2025): 8,052
  - Density: 1,040.6/sq mi (401.78/km^{2})
- Time zone: UTC-6 (Central (CST))
  - Summer (DST): UTC-5 (CDT)
- ZIP code: 76258
- Area code: 940
- FIPS code: 48-57476
- GNIS feature ID: 2411421
- Website: www.pilotpointtx.gov

Pilot Point is a city in Denton County, Texas, United States. Its population was 3,856 at the 2010 census, increasing to 4,381 at the 2020 census.

== History ==
Several Holiness movement denominations met in October, 1908, at a church in Pilot Point and formed what would become the Church of the Nazarene denomination.

On May 25, 2024, a tornado struck both Pilot Point and nearby Valley View resulting extensive damage (notably including a severely damaged truck stop in Valley View), several injuries and at least 7 fatalities. The tornado was assigned a rating of EF3 by the National Weather Service.

== Geography ==
According to the United States Census Bureau, the city has a total area of 3.4 square miles (8.7 km^{2}), all land.

The climate in this area is characterized by hot, humid summers and generally mild to cool winters. According to the Köppen climate classification, Pilot Point has a humid subtropical climate, Cfa on climate maps.

== Demographics ==
Historical population
Census	Pop.	Note	%±
1880	790		—
1890	1,090		38.0%
1910	1,371		—
1920	1,499		9.3%
1930	1,108		−26.1%
1940	1,122		1.3%
1950	1,176		4.8%
1960	1,254		6.6%
1970	1,663		32.6%
1980	2,211		33.0%
1990	2,538		14.8%
2000	3,538		39.4%
2010	3,856		9.0%
2020	4,381		13.6%
2025 (est.)	8,052		83.8%

=== Racial and ethnic composition ===
Racial composition as of the 2020 census (Note: Note: the US Census treats Hispanic/Latino as an ethnic category. This table excludes Latinos from the racial categories and assigns them to a separate category. Hispanics/Latinos can be of any race.)
Race	Number	Percent
White	2,704	61.7%
Black or African American	134	3.1%
American Indian and Alaska Native	97	2.2%
Asian	19	0.4%
Native Hawaiian and Other Pacific Islander	7	0.2%
Some other race	545	12.4%
Two or more races	875	20.0%
Hispanic or Latino (of any race)	1,497	34.2%

=== 2020 census ===
As of the 2020 census, Pilot Point had a population of 4,381, 1,510 households, and 901 families residing in the city. The median age was 37.0 years. 25.3% of residents were under the age of 18 and 15.7% of residents were 65 years of age or older. For every 100 females there were 103.9 males, and for every 100 females age 18 and over there were 98.7 males age 18 and over. 0.0% of residents lived in urban areas, while 100.0% lived in rural areas. There were 1,510 households in Pilot Point, of which 38.5% had children under the age of 18 living in them. Of all households, 55.5% were married-couple households, 16.1% were households with a male householder and no spouse or partner present, and 22.2% were households with a female householder and no spouse or partner present. About 21.0% of all households were made up of individuals and 9.4% had someone living alone who was 65 years of age or older. There were 1,625 housing units, of which 7.1% were vacant. The homeowner vacancy rate was 1.5% and the rental vacancy rate was 9.9%.

== Government ==
The city is governed by an elected council. A separately elected mayor presides over the governing body and also may cast a vote on matters before the council. The city was without a mayor following Mayor McIlravy's arrest on June 21, 2022. Council members and the mayor serve without any compensation pursuant to a Home Rule Charter that was approved by voters in 2009. An appointed city manager oversees daily operations of various city services and functions. Elections each May determine occupants of alternating seats on the council and the mayor is elected biannually.

== Education ==
The city is served by the Pilot Point Independent School District.

== Notable people ==
- Michael C. Burgess, former U.S. representative
- Frederick Edgar Ferguson, Medal of Honor recipient, born in Pilot Point
- Colt Knost, PGA golfer, grew up in Pilot Point, state champion in 2003
- G.A. Moore, Texas High School Football coach, member of the University of North Texas
- Thomas Ambrose Tschoepe, Roman Catholic bishop, born in Pilot Point
- James Latane Noel Jr. Former Texas Attorney General and United States district judge of the United States District Court for the Southern District of Texas.
