= Paloma Creek, Texas =

- Master-planned community
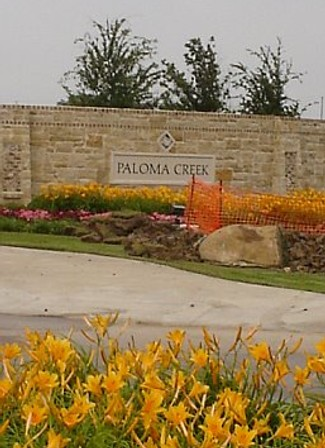
- Paloma Creek community entrance sign in 2007

- Location within the state of Texas
- Coordinates: 33°13′25″N 96°56′15″W
- Country: United States
- State: Texas
- County: Denton

Government
  - Type: Fresh Water Supply District

Area (CDP only)
  - Total: 0.42 sq mi (1.1 km^{2})
  - Land: 0.42 sq mi (1.1 km^{2})
  - Water: 0 sq mi (0.0 km^{2})

Population (2010)(CDP)
  - Total: 5,254
  - Density: 12,000/sq mi (4,800/km^{2})
- Time zone: UTC-6 (Central (CST))
  - Summer (DST): UTC-5 (CDT)
- ZIP codes: 76227, 75068
- Area codes: 214, 469, 972, 945
- Website: www.palomacreek.org

Paloma Creek is a master-planned community in northeastern Denton County, Texas, United States. The community is listed by the U.S. Census Bureau as two separate census-designated places, "Paloma Creek" and "Paloma Creek South", separated by U.S. Highway 380. As of the 2010 census, the Paloma Creek CDP (known locally as "Paloma Creek North") had a population of 2,501, while Paloma Creek South had a population of 2,753. As of 2022, the HOA currently estimates the population to be approximately 20,000.

Paloma Creek was developed by Dallas-based Provident Realty Advisors over an area of approximately 1,200 acres (4.9 km^{2}). The complete master-planned community is located north and south of U.S. Route 380 in an unincorporated area governed by the Denton County Fresh Water Supply Districts 8-A, 8-B, 11-A, 11-B, and 11-C. The Lakeside Estates neighborhood shares Paloma Creek's HOA and is located on the West side of South Paloma Creek. Although it is within the town limits of Little Elm, the vast majority of the 5,600 homes are within the five FWSDs. The homes referred to as North Paloma Creek that are North of 380 have Aubrey mailing addresses. The homes in South Paloma Creek have Little Elm mailing addresses.

FWSD 11-B is also shared with Northlake Estates; however, those homes are not part of Paloma Creek. They merely share infrastructure. Phase I was completed in 2022 with 97 homes and Phase II began shortly thereafter with an additional 252 homes slated for completion.

The proximity to US Route 380 Highway, Dallas North Tollway, and Lewisville Lake Toll Bridge are major factors for the rapid residential growth in the area.

In early 2005, the first phase of homes was completed. Upon its completion, the community will be populated with 5,600 homes constructed by several different builders.

Paloma Creek is divided into the sections listed below:

- Paloma Creek North - 900 home sites, comprising the "Paloma Creek" census-designated place
- Paloma Creek South - 4,700 home sites

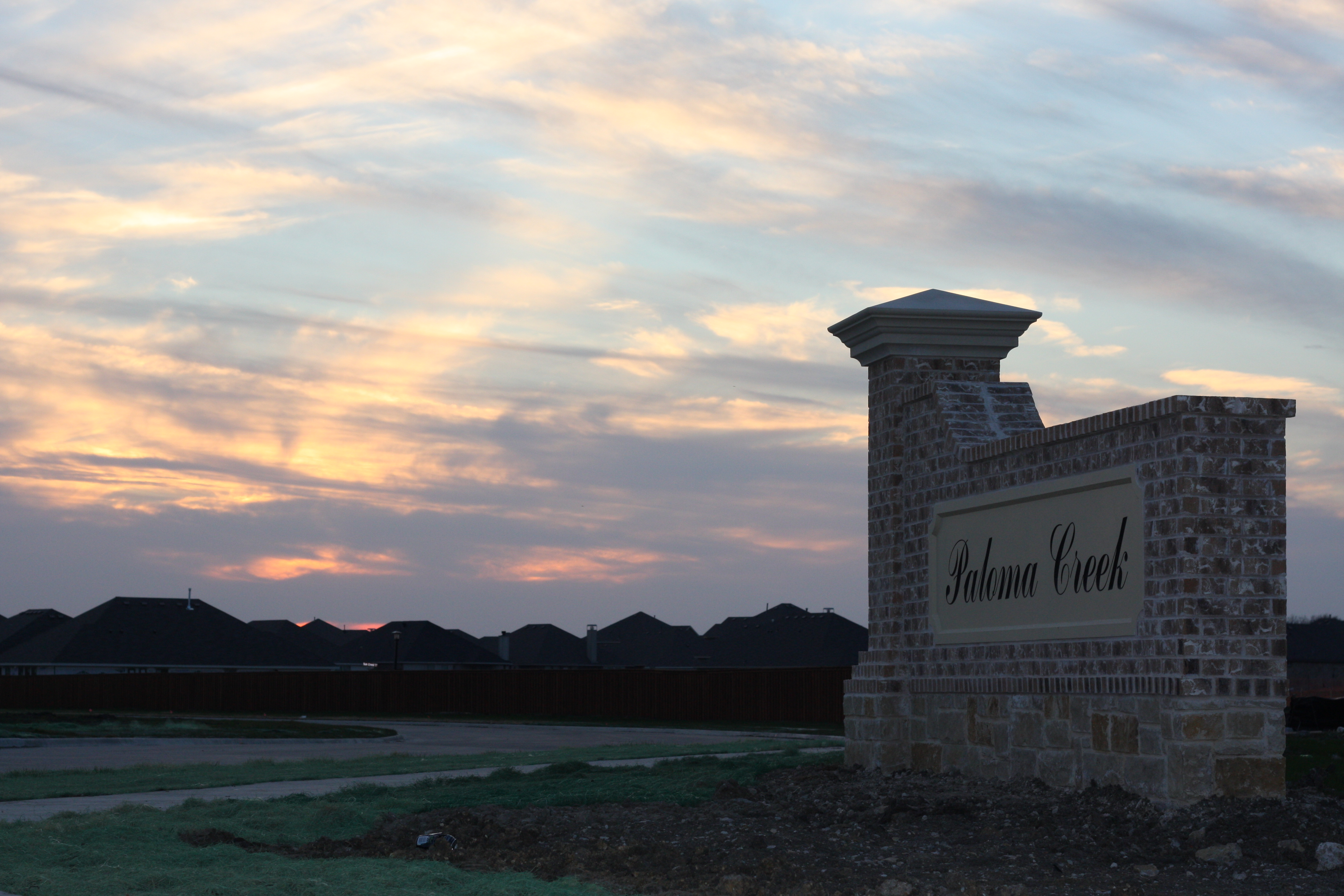
Sunset at Paloma Creek's entrance in Little Elm, Texas.

== Demographics ==
Historical population
Census	Pop.	Note	%±
2010	2,501		—
2020	3,177		27.0%
U.S. Decennial Census; 1850–1900 1910; 1920 1930 1940; 1950 1960 1970; 1980 1990 2000; 2010 2020

Paloma Creek first appeared as a census designated place in the 2010 U.S. census.

Paloma Creek CDP, Texas – Racial and ethnic composition Note: the US Census treats Hispanic/Latino as an ethnic category. This table excludes Latinos from the racial categories and assigns them to a separate category. Hispanics/Latinos may be of any race.
Race / Ethnicity (NH = Non-Hispanic)	Pop 2010	Pop 2020	% 2010	% 2020
White alone (NH)	1,634	1,504	65.33%	47.34%
Black or African American alone (NH)	376	779	15.03%	24.52%
Native American or Alaska Native alone (NH)	25	17	1.00%	0.54%
Asian alone (NH)	27	72	1.08%	2.27%
Native Hawaiian or Pacific Islander alone (NH)	0	9	0.00%	0.28%
Other race alone (NH)	9	16	0.36%	0.50%
Mixed race or Multiracial (NH)	43	175	1.72%	5.51%
Hispanic or Latino (any race)	387	605	15.47%	19.04%
Total	2,501	3,177	100.00%	100.00%

=== 2020 census ===
As of the 2020 census, Paloma Creek had a population of 3,177. The median age was 31.5 years. 34.1% of residents were under the age of 18 and 6.2% of residents were 65 years of age or older. For every 100 females, there were 95.1 males, and for every 100 females age 18 and over, there were 90.6 males age 18 and over.

100.0% of residents lived in urban areas, while 0.0% lived in rural areas.

There were 959 households in Paloma Creek, of which 53.7% had children under the age of 18 living in them. Of all households, 59.1% were married-couple households, 11.1% were households with a male householder and no spouse or partner present, and 24.2% were households with a female householder and no spouse or partner present. About 11.7% of all households were made up of individuals, and 3.1% had someone living alone who was 65 years of age or older.

There were 992 housing units, of which 3.3% were vacant. The homeowner vacancy rate was 2.2%, and the rental vacancy rate was 5.7%.

== Education ==
The Paloma Creek census-designated place is within the Denton Independent School District. The CDP is zoned to Union Park and Catherine Bell Elementary Schools dependent on home address. Paloma Creek Elementary School was closed and repurposed in 2026 following several years of failing state test scores paired with declining enrollment. The CDP is zoned to Navo Middle School, and Braswell High School.

From 2007 to 2016, all of the CDP was zoned to Paloma Creek Elementary and Navo Middle School,while being split between the boundaries of Billy Ryan High School and Denton High School.

The majority of Denton County, Paloma Creek included, is in the boundary of North Central Texas College.

== Protection and services ==
Police protection is provided by the Little Elm Police Department. Fire protection is provided by the Little Elm Fire Department funded by a monthly fee, added to the water bill, to cover residents of Paloma Creek. The town of Little Elm is required to serve the commercial areas, as they are located in its town limits. Water and sewer is provided by a fresh water supply district who contracts with Mustang SUD for billing purposes and Waste Connections for trash and recycling. All of Paloma Creek uses CoServ as its electric and gas utility provider.
