= USS Canon (PG-90) =

Gunboat of the United States Navy

Coordinates: 39.891501°N 75.180773°W

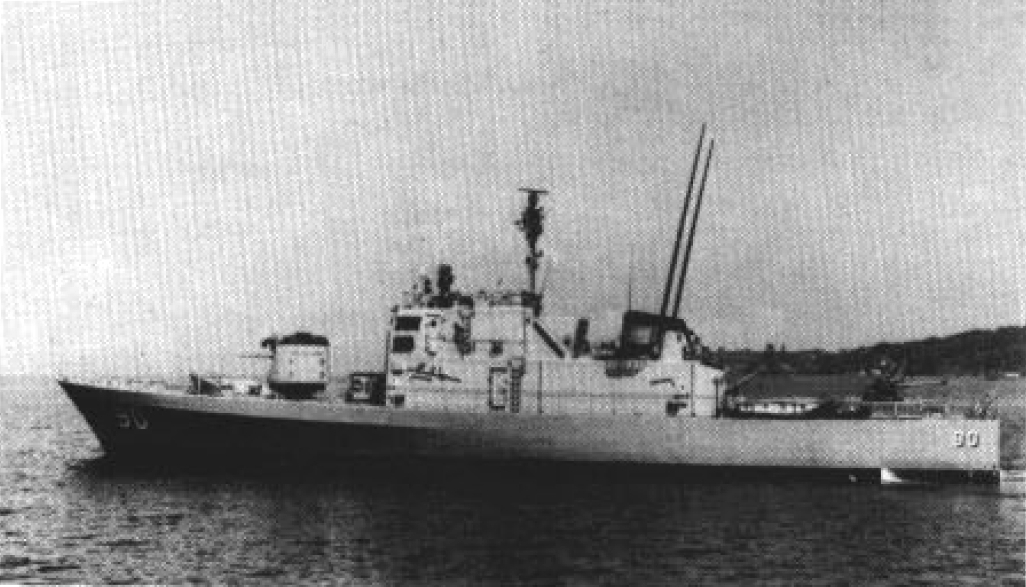

History

United States
- Name: USS Canon (PG-90)
- Builder: Tacoma Boatbuilding Company
- Laid down: 28 June 1966
- Launched: 10 June 1967
- Commissioned: 28 July 1968
- Decommissioned: 31 January 1977
- Stricken: 9 October 1984
- Fate: Stricken, final disposition pending

General characteristics
- Class & type: Asheville-class gunboat
- Displacement: 245 tons
- Length: 164 ft 6 in
- Beam: 23 ft 11 in
- Draft: 5 ft 4 in
- Speed: 40 kts
- Complement: 24
- Armament: 1 × 3 in (76 mm)/50 caliber gun; 1 × Bofors 40 mm gun mount; 2 × twin .50 caliber machine guns

The first USS Canon (PGM-90/PG-90) is a Asheville-class gunboat that served in the United States Navy during the Vietnam War. She is currently on donation hold.

Canon was laid down by the Tacoma Boatbuilding Company, Tacoma, Washington on 28 June 1966, and commissioned 24 June 1967.

Canon served off the coast of Vietnam as part of Operation Market Time. In one operation the ship took 8 rocket hits and 14 crew members wounded. One Navy Cross, three Silver Stars and five Bronze Stars were awarded to members of the crew.

Canon was decommissioned on 31 January 1977.

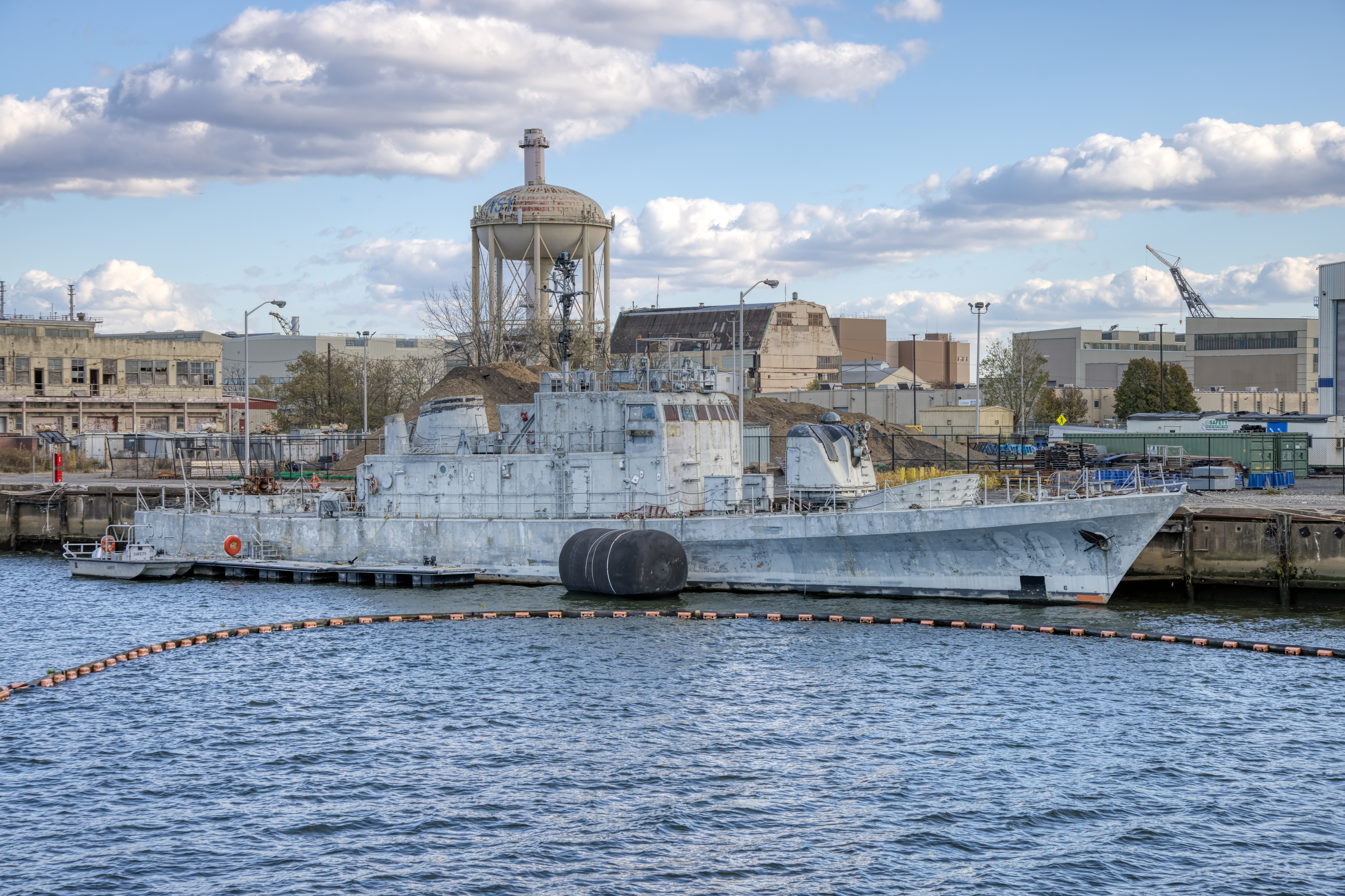
The ex-USS Canon - an Asheville Class Gunboat sits at the Philadelphia Inactive Ship Maintenance Facility awaiting her fate.

Canon had been identified as a candidate for preservation as a veteran's museum in Sheboygan, Wisconsin and was placed on donation hold in 2002. Efforts by the Wisconsin Naval Ship Association, Inc. of Greendale, WI to preserve the ship continued through December of 2008, however they did not meet the Navy's minimum requirements for ship donation. The donation hold was removed on 30 August 2012 and her status updated to pending dismantling by the 2015 US Navy 30 year Shipbuilding Plan.

== Awards ==
- Meritorious Unit Commendation
- Navy "E" Ribbon
- National Defense Service Medal
- Vietnam Service Medal with 3 campaign stars
- Republic of Vietnam Gallantry Cross
