= Phil Danaher (American football) =

American football player and coach (born 1948)

Biographical details
- Born: November 23, 1948 (age 77); Saint Joseph, Missouri, U.S.

Playing career
- 1968–1970: Angelo State
- Position: Quarterback

Coaching career (HC unless noted)
- 1971–1973: Edison HS (TX) (assistant)
- 1974–1977: Dilley HS (TX)
- 1978–1983: Hamshire-Fannett HS (TX)
- 1984–2021: Calallen HS (TX)

Head coaching record
- Overall: 488–118–4

Philip C. Danaher (born November 23, 1948) is an American former high school football coach. He was the head football coach at Calallen High School in Corpus Christi, Texas, from 1984 to 2021, and is one of only three Texas coaches to reach 400 career wins.

Danaher was born in Missouri but shortly afterwards his family moved to south Texas. He played high school football at Harlingen High School, graduated in 1967 and received a football scholarship from Angelo State University. Danaher received his Bachelor of Science in physical education in August 1971. He then became assistant coach at 5A Edison High School in San Antonio.

In 1974 Danaher got his first head coaching job in Dilley, Texas, a class 2A school. During his first year, the Wolves won their first district championship in more than a decade and were named regional co-champions. Danaher left Dilley with a 25–15–2 record after four seasons for the head coaching position at Hamshire-Fannett High School, a 3A school. Danaher guided the Hamshire-Fannett Longhorns to a 43–22 record in six years, winning three district championships and advancing to the regional finals twice.

Danaher's became the head coach at Calallen High School, a class 4A school at the time. He turned around a football program that had not reached the playoffs in 28 years, leading them to 12 state semi-finals appearances and two title games since. Beginning in 1988, Calallen had a state record 16 consecutive seasons with ten or more wins — twice as much as the previous record established by Yates High School from Houston, Texas in the 1960s.

In 2004 Danaher won his 300th high school game, making him only one of four coaches in Texas high school football history to do so. By 2010, Danaher ranked second in all-time Texas high school wins as a coach, trailing only the G. A. Moore's 426 wins. On November 3, 2016, Danaher's Calallen Wildcats defeated the Flour Bluff Hornets 31–7 in the District 30-5A InterZone Championship game, giving Danaher his 427th win, making him the winningest coach in Texas High School football history.

Calallen's 2019 season ended December 7, 2019, in the Region 4 Final, a 49-42 loss to Boerne-Champion. Their 2019 record of 12-2, gives Danaher a career head coaching record of 470–113–4.

== Personal ==
Danaher's son, Wes, played running back at Calallen from 1992 to 1995 and rushed for 8,855 yards, which trailed at the time only Ken Hall. As of 2018, he ranks 6th all-time for most rushing yards in a high school career.
