= Denton Independent School District =

School district in Texas, United States

Address
- 1307 N. Locust Street Denton, TX, USA
- Coordinates: 33°13′32″N 97°8′2″W

District information
- Type: Independent School District
- Motto: Empowering lifelong learners to be engaged citizens who positively impact their local and global community.
- Grades: PK-12
- Established: 1882
- Superintendent: Susannah O’Bara
- Governing agency: Texas Education Agency
- Schools: 46
- NCES District ID: 4816740

Students and staff
- Students: 33,177 (2025-26)

Other information
- Website: www.dentonisd.org

Denton Independent School District (Denton ISD or DISD) is a school district based in Denton, Texas, United States. Covering approximately 170 square miles in Denton County, the district serves most of Denton, Cross Roads, and Shady Shores, as well as portions of Aubrey, Bartonville, Copper Canyon, Corinth, Double Oak, Flower Mound, Lantana, Little Elm, Oak Point, Paloma Creek, Paloma Creek South, Prosper, Providence Village, and Savannah.

As of 2026, Denton ISD operates 46 campuses, including 4 high schools, 9 middle schools, 29 primary schools, and 4 alternative campuses. The district most recently received a C rating from the Texas Education Agency (TEA).

== Academic achievement ==
Historical district TEA accountability ratings

- 2026: C - 76
- 2025: B - 80
- 2024: C - 76
- 2023: C - 78
- 2022: B - 86
- 2021: No rating given due to COVID-19
- 2020: No rating given due to COVID-19
- 2019: B - 89
- 2018: B - 86
- 2017: Met Standard
- 2016: Met Standard
- 2015: Met Standard
- 2014: Met Standard
- 2013: Met Standard
- 2012: No rating given due to change in ratings system
- 2011: Academically Acceptable
- 2010: Recognized
- 2009: Academically Acceptable
- 2008: Academically Acceptable
- 2007: Academically Acceptable
- 2006: Academically Acceptable
- 2005: Academically Acceptable
- 2004: Academically Acceptable

== List of facilities ==
=== Athletic facilities ===
- Bill Carrico Athletic Complex
- C. H. Collins Athletic Complex
- DISD Natatorium

=== Secondary schools ===
High schools (grades 9-12)
Name	Established	Mascot	Colors	Location	Additional information
Braswell High School	2016	Bengals	Red & Black	Little Elm	
Denton High School	1884	Broncos	Purple & Gold	Denton	
John H. Guyer High School	2005	Wildcats	Black & Silver	Denton	
Mia Price High School	2027	TBA	TBA	Cross Roads	
Billy Ryan High School	1995	Raiders	Blue & Red	Denton	Originally operated as Denton High School - Ryan Campus with grades 9-10 from 1991-1995

Middle schools (grades 6-8)
Name	Established	Mascot	Colors	Location	Additional information
Calhoun Middle School	1957	Colts	Purple & Silver	Denton	
Pat Hagan Cheek Middle School	2023	Chargers	Red, Black, & Gray	Prosper	
Dr. Ronny W. Crownover Middle School	2002	Cowboys	Maroon, Black, & Gray	Corinth	
Tom Harpool Middle School	2008	Longhorns	Burnt Orange & White	Lantana	
Carroll McMath Middle School	1998	Tigers	Navy & Gold	Denton	
Bettye Myers Middle School	2013	Titans	Blue & Red	Shady Shores	
Navo Middle School	2005	Panthers	Black & Gold	Aubrey	
Rodriguez Middle School	2017	Vipers	Dark Teal & Black	Oak Point	
Chester O. Strickland Middle School	1968	Vikings	Green & Gold	Denton	1994–96 National Blue Ribbon School

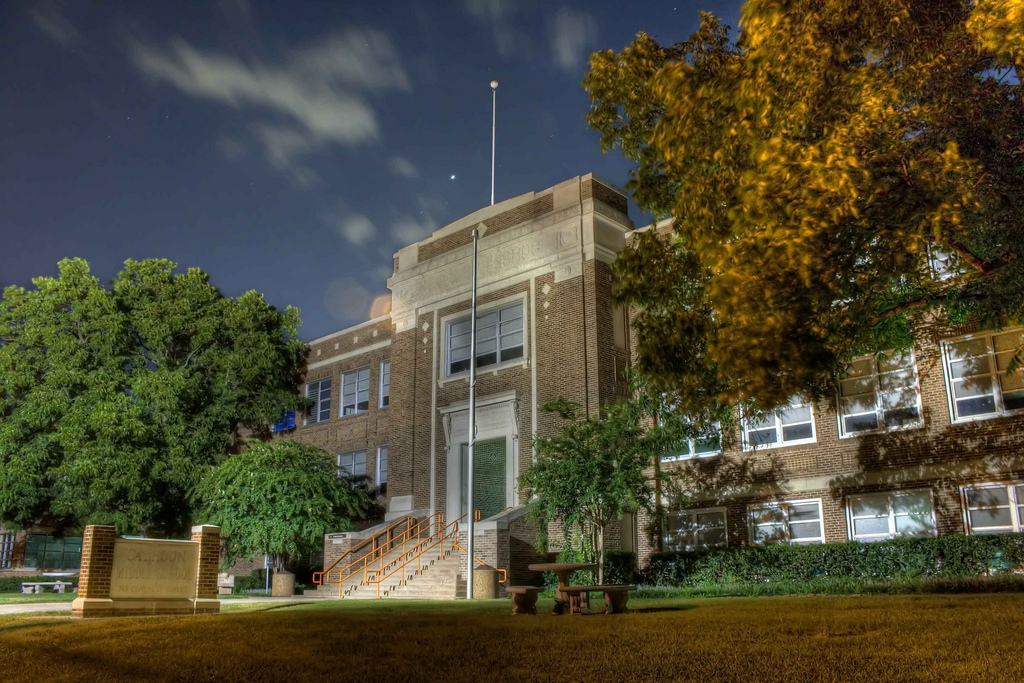
Calhoun Middle School

==== Alternative school (DAEP) ====
- Lester Davis School (formerly Touchstone)

==== Application-based high schools ====
- Fred Moore High School
- LaGrone Academy

==== Joe Sparks Campus (Denton County Juvenile Detention System) ====
- Sparks Campus - students who encountered legal and disciplinary issues to continue their education - named after former Denton ISD teacher Joe Dale Sparks

=== Primary schools ===
Elementary schools (grades K-5)
Name	Established	Mascot	Colors	Location	Additional information
Dorothy P. Adkins Elementary School	2014	Aviators	Royal Blue & Lime Green	Lantana	
Alice Moore Alexander Elementary School	1884	Panthers	Maroon & Gray	Denton	Originally Robert E. Lee Elementary from 1884-2017; Current campus opened in 1988
Catherine Coleman Bell Elementary School	2016	Bobcats	Teal & Gray	Little Elm	
Annie Webb Blanton Elementary School	2008	Knights	Blue & Silver	Lantana	
Frank Borman Elementary School	1970	Astros	Navy & Gold	Denton	
Cross Oaks Elementary School	2010	Owls	Green & Gold	Cross Roads	
E.P. Rayzor Elementary School	2002	Wolves	Brick Red & Gray	Lantana	
Evers Park Elementary School	1985	Eagles	Royal Blue & Yellow	Denton	
J.L. Ginnings Elementary School	1968	Jaguars	Royal Blue & Yellow	Denton	Temporarily closed from 2025-2027 while a replacement campus is being built on site
Mildred Hawk Elementary School	2005	Mavericks	Navy, Baby Blue, & White	Corinth	
Fred Hill Elementary School	2025	Dolphins	Teal, Orange, & White	Little Elm	
Eva Swan Hodge Elementary School	1987	Hawks	Black & Red	Denton	
Sam Houston Elementary School	1982	Texans	Red, White, & Blue	Denton	
Dorothy Martinez Elementary School	2024	Monarchs	Red, Black, & Gold	Little Elm	
Ronald McNair Elementary School	1987	Commanders	Red, White, & Blue	Denton	
L.A. Nelson Elementary School	2007	Lions	Crimson, Navy, & Khaki	Denton	
Newton Rayzor Elementary School	1960	Honey Bees	Purple, Green, & Blue	Denton	
Pecan Creek Elementary School	2002	Bears	Blue & Green	Denton	
Providence Elementary School	2004	Patriots	Red, White, & Blue	Aubrey	
Anita Reeves Elementary School	2025	Rockets	Purple, Green, & Gray	Denton	
Tomás RiveraElementary School	1994	Stars	Royal Blue, Silver, & Gold	Denton	
Sandbrock Ranch Elementary School	2022	Champions	Green, Silver, & White	Aubrey	
Savannah Elementary School	2005	Gators	Blue, Orange, & Green	Aubrey	
Nette Shulz Elementary School	1960	Mustangs	Green & White	Denton	Originally Woodrow Wilson Elementary from 1884-2021
Olive Stephens Elementary School	2008	Bulldogs	Blue & Silver	Shady Shores	
Union Park Elementary School	2019	Pioneers	Blue, Green, & Yellow	Aubrey	
W.S. Ryan Elementary School	2001	Wranglers	Red & Blue	Denton	

Early childhood centers (Pre-K)
Name	Established	Location	Additional information
Fred Moore Day Nursery School at Gonzalez	2021	Denton	Houses year-round child care for ages 6 weeks to 4 years; Relocated to Gonzalez campus in 2024
Ann Windle School for Young Children	2001	Denton	Houses pre-k, head start, and bilingual programs

- Former schools: Paloma Creek ES

== Denton ISD television channel ==
Homes in the Denton ISD area get the Denton ISD channel on cable

- Channel 31 on Charter Communications
- Channel 40 on Frontier FiOS
- Channel 88 on AT&T U-verse

== See also ==
- List of school districts in Texas
