= Cross Roads, Texas =

Town in Denton County, Texas, United States

- Town
- Location of Cross Roads in Denton County, Texas
- Coordinates: 33°14′20″N 97°00′16″W
- Country: United States
- State: Texas
- County: Denton

Area
  - Total: 6.80 sq mi (17.61 km^{2})
  - Land: 6.72 sq mi (17.41 km^{2})
  - Water: 0.077 sq mi (0.20 km^{2})
- Elevation: 600 ft (180 m)

Population (2020)
  - Total: 1,744
  - Density: 225.5/sq mi (87.06/km^{2})
- Time zone: UTC-6 (Central (CST))
  - Summer (DST): UTC-5 (CDT)
- ZIP code: 76227
- Area code: 940
- FIPS code: 48-17852
- GNIS feature ID: 2412391
- Website: www.crossroadstx.gov

Cross Roads is a town in Denton County, Texas, United States. The population was 1,744 in 2020.

== Geography ==
According to the United States Census Bureau, the town has a total area of 6.9 square miles (18 km^{2}), all land.

== Demographics ==
Historical population
Census	Pop.	Note	%±
1980	302		—
1990	361		19.5%
2000	603		67.0%
2010	1,563		159.2%
2020	1,744		11.6%
U.S. Decennial Census

Cross Roads racial composition as of 2020 (NH = Non-Hispanic) (Note: Note: the US Census treats Hispanic/Latino as an ethnic category. This table excludes Latinos from the racial categories and assigns them to a separate category. Hispanics/Latinos can be of any race.)
Race	Number	Percentage
White (NH)	1,194	68.46%
Black or African American (NH)	140	8.03%
Native American or Alaska Native (NH)	9	0.52%
Asian (NH)	47	2.69%
Pacific Islander (NH)	3	0.17%
Some Other Race (NH)	8	0.46%
Mixed/Multi-Racial (NH)	102	5.85%
Hispanic or Latino	241	13.82%
Total	1,744	

As of the 2020 United States census, there were 1,744 people, 357 households, and 312 families residing in the town.

== Education ==
Cross Roads is served by Aubrey Independent School District (in parts of northern Cross Roads) and Denton Independent School District (in the rest of the city).

Providence Elementary School serves most of Denton ISD Cross Roads, while a section is zoned to Cross Oaks Elementary School. All of the Denton ISD portion is zoned to Rodriguez Middle School, and Braswell High School.

The majority of Denton County, Cross Roads included, is in the boundary of North Central Texas College.

== See also ==
- List of municipalities in Texas
