= Calallen High School =

Public school in Texas, United States

Location
- 4001 Wildcat Dr. Corpus Christi, Nueces, TX 78410; United States; 27°51′26.3″N 97°38′8.8″W

Information
- School type: Public High school
- Motto: "The Pride of Texas"
- School district: Calallen ISD
- Superintendent: Emily Lorenz
- Principal: Yvonne Marquez-Neth
- Teaching staff: 89.60 (FTE)
- Grades: 9-12
- Enrollment: 1,177 (2023-2024)
- Student to teacher ratio: 13.14
- Colors: Maroon, White
- Song: Hail to Calallen
- Fight song: Tiger Rag
- Athletics conference: UIL 4A Division 1 Classification
- Sports: Football, Baseball, Softball, Basketball, Track and Field, Tennis, Volleyball, Swimming, Soccer, Golf
- Mascot: Willie the Wildcat
- Nickname: Wildcats/Lady Cats
- Website: Official Calallen HS Website

Calallen High School is a public high school serving grades 9–12. The school is located in the Calallen Independent School District in northwest Corpus Christi, Texas, United States.

== Background ==
Calallen's name comes from Calvin Joseph (Cal) Allen (1859–1922), a prominent early rancher. Allen owned a 4,000-acre (16 km^{2}) cattle ranch on which the Calallen Independent School District is now located. Allen donated land to the St. Louis, Brownsville and Mexico Rail Line as right-of-way; in exchange, the railroad agreed to place a depot on Allen's property. Allen then subdivided the land adjacent to the depot and established a townsite there. The town was named Calvin until it was discovered that another community in Texas already had that name. Founded in 1910, Calallen was annexed by the city of Corpus Christi in 1970.

== Notable alumni ==
- Amy Acuff, U.S. Olympian and Playboy Model
- John A. Brieden, former national commander of the American Legion
- Tom DeLay, former U.S. Congressman and House Majority Leader
- Jessie Pavelka, U.S. TV actor and model
- Dustin Vaughan, quarterback for the Baltimore Ravens
- Logan Verrett, baseball pitcher for the New York Mets
- Rob Zastryzny, baseball pitcher for the Chicago Cubs
