= Ranchview High School =

Secondary school in Irving, Texas, US

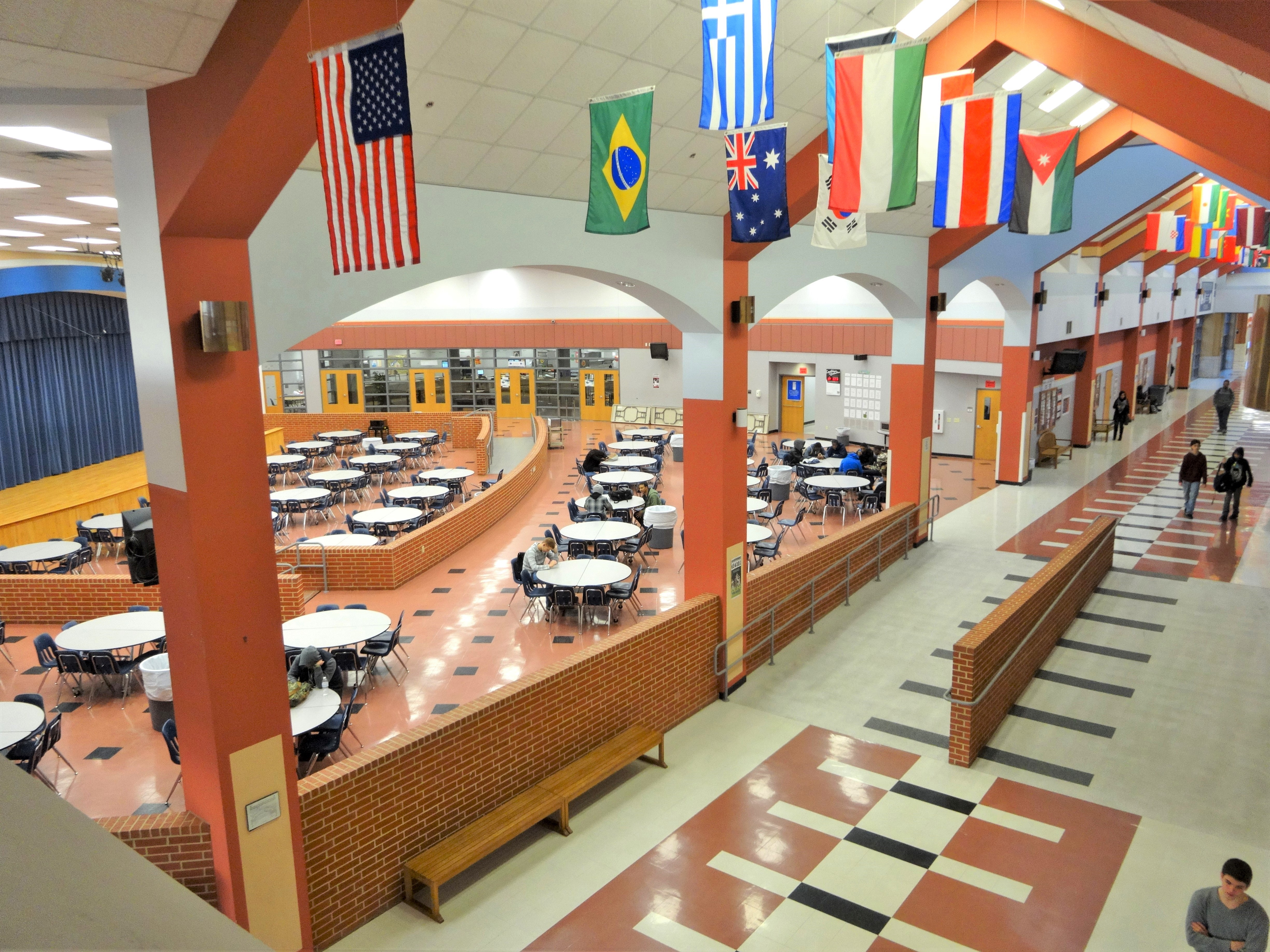
- View of the cafeteria and main hallway from the second floor walkway overlook.

Location
- 8401 Valley Ranch Parkway East; Irving, Dallas, Texas, 75063; United States; 32.91861°N 96.94531°W

Information
- School type: Public, Secondary
- Opened: 2002
- School district: Carrollton-Farmers Branch Independent School District
- School code: 443572
- Principal: Robert Atchison
- Staff: 75.47 (FTE)
- Grades: 9th through 12th
- Enrollment: 908 (2023–2024)
- Student to teacher ratio: 12.03
- Colors: Navy, Silver, and Teal
- Mascot: Wolf
- Website: ranchview.cfbisd.edu

Ranchview High School is a public high school located in Irving, Texas (US). The school opened in 2002 as part of the Carrollton-Farmers Branch Independent School District (CFBISD). Ranchview serves students in Irving (including portions of Las Colinas and Valley Ranch), Coppell, and Farmers Branch. Prior to Ranchview's opening, all students living west of Interstate 35E attended R.L. Turner High School.

In 2017, the school was rated "Met Standard" by the Texas Education Agency, with a 4-Star Distinction for Academic Achievements in ELA/Reading, Mathematics, Science, and Post-Secondary Readiness.

== Overview ==
Ranchview High School is a part of CFBISD, although it is located in Valley Ranch within the city limits of Irving. The campus has a 54-acre (220,000 m^{2}) site located between Valley Ranch Parkway South, Valley Ranch Parkway East and Ranchview Drive. Ranchview started with 8th and 9th grades only when it opened in 2002. High schools in CFB-ISD do not traditionally include 8th grade, so the following year the 8th grade class became the freshman class, and 8th grade classes were moved back to Barbara Bush Middle School. The school continued its second year with 9th and 10th grades, and added a grade each year thereafter until reaching full high school status (9–12th grades) in the 2005–2006 school year.

== Athletics ==
The Ranchview Wolves compete in the following sports:

- Baseball
- Basketball
- Cross Country
- Football
- Golf
- Powerlifting
- Soccer
- Softball
- Swimming and Diving
- Tennis
- Track and Field
- Volleyball

=== Basketball ===
In only its second year of boys' basketball varsity play (2005–2006), the Ranchview boys' basketball team played in finals of the Texas High School State 3-A Basketball championship, losing to Roosevelt High School 67–55, to finish as state runner-up.
