= List of law enforcement agencies in Texas =

This is a list of law enforcement agencies in the U.S. state of Texas.

According to the US Bureau of Justice Statistics' 2008 Census of State and Local Law Enforcement Agencies, the state had 2,795 law enforcement agencies, the most of any state. These agencies employed 81,196 sworn peace officers, about 244 for each 100,000 residents.

== Federal agencies ==
There are over 150 federal law enforcement offices in Texas. including those for the Federal Bureau of Prisons, Bureau of Alcohol, Tobacco, Firearms and Explosives; Customs and Border Protection; Drug Enforcement Administration; Federal Bureau of Investigation; Immigration and Customs Enforcement; United States Secret Service; Department of the Army Criminal Investigation Division; Naval Criminal Investigative Service, and U.S. Marshals. According to the Bureau of Justice Statistics, a federal law enforcement agency is "an organizational unit, or subunit, of the federal government with the principle (sic) functions of prevention, detection, and investigation of crime and the apprehension of alleged offenders."

== State agencies ==
- Texas Alcoholic Beverage Commission
- Texas Attorney General
- Texas Comptroller - Criminal Investigation Division (State Police)
- Texas Commission on Law Enforcement (regulatory agency)
- Texas Department of Criminal Justice
- Texas Department of Insurance
  - State Fire Marshal's Office
  - Fraud Unit
- Texas Department of Public Safety
  - Texas Highway Patrol
  - Texas Ranger Division
- Texas Parks and Wildlife Department
- Texas Racing Commission - State Police
- Texas Juvenile Justice Department – Office of the Inspector General
- Texas and Southwestern Cattle Raisers Association Special Rangers
- Texas State Board of Dental Examiners - Investigations Division

== County Sheriff Offices ==
- Anderson County Sheriff's Office
- Andrews County Sheriff's Office
- Angelina County Sheriff's Office
- Aransas County Sheriff's Office
- Archer County Sheriff's Office
- Armstrong County Sheriff's Office
- Atascosa County Sheriff's Office
- Austin County Sheriff's Office
- Bailey County Sheriff's Office
- Bandera County Sheriff's Office
- Bastrop County Sheriff's Office
- Baylor County Sheriff's Office
- Bee County Sheriff's Office
- Bell County Sheriff's Office
- Bexar County Sheriff's Office
- Blanco County Sheriff's Office
- Borden County Sheriff's Office
- Bosque County Sheriff's Office
- Bowie County Sheriff's Office
- Brazoria County Sheriff's Office
- Brewster County Sheriff's Office
- Briscoe County Sheriff's Office
- Brooks County Sheriff's Office
- Brown County Sheriff's Office
- Burleson County Sheriff's Office
- Burnet County Sheriff's Office
- Caldwell County Sheriff's Office
- Calhoun County Sheriff's Office
- Callahan County Sheriff's Office
- Cameron County Sheriff's Office
- Camp County Sheriff's Office
- Carson County Sheriff's Office
- Cass County Sheriff's Office
- Castro County Sheriff's Office
- Chambers County Sheriff's Office
- Cherokee County Sheriff's Office
- Childress County Sheriff's Office
- Clay County Sheriff's Office
- Cochran County Sheriff's Office
- Coke County Sheriff's Office
- Coleman County Sheriff's Office
- Collin County Sheriff's Office
- Collingsworth County Sheriff's Office
- Colorado County Sheriff's Office
- Comal County Sheriff's Office
- Comanche County Sheriff's Office
- Concho County Sheriff's Office
- Cooke County Sheriff's Office
- Coryell County Sheriff's Office
- Cottle County Sheriff's Office
- Crane County Sheriff's Office
- Crockett County Sheriff's Office
- Crosby County Sheriff's Office
- Culberson County Sheriff's Office
- Dallam County Sheriff's Office
- Dallas County Sheriff's Office
- Dawson County Sheriff's Office
- DeWitt County Sheriff's Office
- Deaf Smith County Sheriff's Office
- Delta County Sheriff's Office
- Denton County Sheriff's Office
- Dickens County Sheriff's Office
- Dimmit County Sheriff's Office
- Donley County Sheriff's Office
- Duval County Sheriff's Office
- Eastland County Sheriff's Office
- Ector County Sheriff's Office
- Edwards County Sheriff's Office
- El Paso County Sheriff's Office
- Ellis County Sheriff's Office
- Erath County Sheriff's Office
- Falls County Sheriff's Office
- Fannin County Sheriff's Office
- Fayette County Sheriff's Office
- Fisher County Sheriff's Office
- Floyd County Sheriff's Office
- Foard County Sheriff's Office
- Fort Bend County Sheriff's Office
- Franklin County Sheriff's Office
- Freestone County Sheriff's Office
- Frio County Sheriff's Office
- Gaines County Sheriff's Office
- Galveston County Sheriff's Office
- Garza County Sheriff's Office
- Gillespie County Sheriff's Office
- Glasscock County Sheriff's Office
- Goliad County Sheriff's Office
- Gonzales County Sheriff's Office
- Gray County Sheriff's Office
- Grayson County Sheriff's Office
- Gregg County Sheriff's Office
- Grimes County Sheriff's Office
- Guadalupe County Sheriff's Office
- Hale County Sheriff's Office
- Hall County Sheriff's Office
- Hamilton County Sheriff's Office
- Hansford County Sheriff's Office
- Hardeman County Sheriff's Office
- Hardin County Sheriff's Office
- Harris County Sheriff's Office
- Harrison County Sheriff's Office
- Hartley County Sheriff's Office
- Hays County Sheriff's Office
- Hemphill County Sheriff's Office
- Henderson County Sheriff's Office
- Hidalgo County Sheriff's Office
- Hill County Sheriff's Office
- Hockley County Sheriff's Office
- Hood County Sheriff's Office
- Hopkins County Sheriff's Office
- Houston County Sheriff's Office
- Howard County Sheriff's Office
- Hudspeth County Sheriff's Office
- Hunt County Sheriff's Office
- Hutchinson County Sheriff's Office
- Irion County Sheriff's Office
- Jack County Sheriff's Office
- Jackson County Sheriff's Office
- Jasper County Sheriff's Office
- Jeff Davis County Sheriff's Office
- Jefferson County Sheriff's Office
- Jim Hogg County Sheriff's Office
- Jim Wells County Sheriff's Office
- Johnson County Sheriff's Office
- Jones County Sheriff's Office
- Karnes County Sheriff's Office
- Kaufman County Sheriff's Office
- Kendall County Sheriff's Office
- Kenedy County Sheriff's Office
- Kent County Sheriff's Office
- Kerr County Sheriff's Office
- Kimble County Sheriff's Office
- King County Sheriff's Office
- Kinney County Sheriff's Office
- Kleberg County Sheriff's Office
- Knox County Sheriff's Office
- La Salle County Sheriff's Office
- Lamar County Sheriff's Office
- Lamb County Sheriff's Office
- Lampasas County Sheriff's Office
- Lavaca County Sheriff's Office
- Lee County Sheriff's Office
- Leon County Sheriff's Office
- Liberty County Sheriff's Office
- Limestone County Sheriff's Office
- Lipscomb County Sheriff's Office
- Live Oak County Sheriff's Office
- Llano County Sheriff's Office
- Loving County Sheriff's Office
- Lubbock County Sheriff's Office
- Lynn County Sheriff's Office
- Madison County Sheriff's Office
- Marion County Sheriff's Office
- Martin County Sheriff's Office
- Mason County Sheriff's Office
- Matagorda County Sheriff's Office
- Maverick County Sheriff's Office
- McCulloch County Sheriff's Office
- McLennan County Sheriff's Office
- McMullen County Sheriff's Office
- Medina County Sheriff's Office
- Menard County Sheriff's Office
- Midland County Sheriff's Office
- Milam County Sheriff's Office
- Mills County Sheriff's Office
- Mitchell County Sheriff's Office
- Montague County Sheriff's Office
- Montgomery County Sheriff's Office
- Moore County Sheriff's Office
- Morris County Sheriff's Office
- Motley County Sheriff's Office
- Nacogdoches County Sheriff's Office
- Navarro County Sheriff's Office
- Newton County Sheriff's Office
- Nolan County Sheriff's Office
- Nueces County Sheriff's Office
- Ochiltree County Sheriff's Office
- Oldham County Sheriff's Office
- Orange County Sheriff's Office
- Palo Pinto County Sheriff's Office
- Panola County Sheriff's Office
- Parker County Sheriff's Office
- Parmer County Sheriff's Office
- Pecos County Sheriff's Office
- Polk County Sheriff's Office
- Potter County Sheriff's Office
- Presidio County Sheriff's Office
- Rains County Sheriff's Office
- Randall County Sheriff's Office
- Reagan County Sheriff's Office
- Real County Sheriff's Office
- Red River County Sheriff's Office
- Reeves County Sheriff's Office
- Refugio County Sheriff's Office
- Roberts County Sheriff's Office
- Robertson County Sheriff's Office
- Rockwall County Sheriff's Office
- Runnels County Sheriff's Office
- Rusk County Sheriff's Office
- Sabine County Sheriff's Office
- San Augustine County Sheriff's Office
- San Jacinto County Sheriff's Office
- San Patricio County Sheriff's Office
- San Saba County Sheriff's Office
- Schleicher County Sheriff's Office
- Scurry County Sheriff's Office
- Shackelford County Sheriff's Office
- Shelby County Sheriff's Office
- Sherman County Sheriff's Office
- Smith County Sheriff's Office
- Somervell County Sheriff's Office
- Starr County Sheriff's Office
- Stephens County Sheriff's Office
- Sterling County Sheriff's Office
- Stonewall County Sheriff's Office
- Sutton County Sheriff's Office
- Swisher County Sheriff's Office
- Tarrant County Sheriff's Office
- Taylor County Sheriff's Office
- Terrell County Sheriff's Office
- Terry County Sheriff's Office
- Throckmorton County Sheriff's Office
- Titus County Sheriff's Office
- Tom Green County Sheriff's Office
- Travis County Sheriff's Office
- Trinity County Sheriff's Office
- Tyler County Sheriff's Office
- Upshur County Sheriff's Office
- Upton County Sheriff's Office
- Uvalde County Sheriff's Office
- Val Verde County Sheriff's Office
- Van Zandt County Sheriff's Office
- Victoria County Sheriff's Office
- Walker County Sheriff's Office
- Waller County Sheriff's Office
- Ward County Sheriff's Office
- Washington County Sheriff's Office
- Webb County Sheriff's Office
- Wharton County Sheriff's Office
- Wheeler County Sheriff's Office
- Wichita County Sheriff's Office
- Wilbarger County Sheriff's Office
- Willacy County Sheriff's Office
- Williamson County Sheriff's Office
- Wilson County Sheriff's Office
- Winkler County Sheriff's Office
- Wise County Sheriff's Office
- Wood County Sheriff's Office
- Yoakum County Sheriff's Office
- Young County Sheriff's Office
- Zapata County Sheriff's Office
- Zavala County Sheriff's Office

== County constable agencies ==
- Anderson County Constable’s Office
- Andrews County Constable’s Office
- Angelina County Constable’s Office
- Aransas County Constable’s Office
- Archer County Constable’s Office
- Armstrong County Constable’s Office
- Atascosa County Constable’s Office
- Austin County Constable’s Office
- Bailey County Constable’s Office
- Bandera County Constable’s Office
- Bastrop County Constable’s Office
- Baylor County Constable’s Office
- Bee County Constable’s Office
- Bell County Constable’s Office
- Bexar County Constable’s Office
- Blanco County Constable’s Office
- Borden County Constable’s Office
- Bosque County Constable’s Office
- Bowie County Constable’s Office
- Brazoria County Constable’s Office
- Brazos County Constable’s Office
- Brewster County Constable’s Office
- Briscoe County Constable’s Office
- Brooks County Constable’s Office
- Brown County Constable’s Office
- Burleson County Constable’s Office
- Burnet County Constable’s Office
- Caldwell County Constable’s Office
- Calhoun County Constable’s Office
- Callahan County Constable’s Office
- Cameron County Constable’s Office
- Camp County Constable’s Office
- Carson County Constable’s Office
- Cass County Constable’s Office
- Castro County Constable’s Office
- Chambers County Constable’s Office
- Cherokee County Constable’s Office
- Childress County Constable’s Office
- Clay County Constable’s Office
- Cochran County Constable’s Office
- Coke County Constable’s Office
- Coleman County Constable’s Office
- Collin County Constable’s Office
- Collingsworth County Constable’s Office
- Colorado County Constable’s Office
- Comal County Constable’s Office
- Comanche County Constable’s Office
- Concho County Constable’s Office
- Cooke County Constable’s Office
- Coryell County Constable’s Office
- Cottle County Constable’s Office
- Crane County Constable’s Office
- Crockett County Constable’s Office
- Crosby County Constable’s Office
- Culberson County Constable’s Office
- Dallam County Constable’s Office
- Dallas County Constable’s Office
- Dawson County Constable’s Office
- DeWitt County Constable’s Office
- Deaf Smith County Constable’s Office
- Delta County Constable’s Office
- Denton County Constable’s Office
- Dickens County Constable’s Office
- Dimmit County Constable’s Office
- Donley County Constable’s Office
- Duval County Constable’s Office
- Eastland County Constable’s Office
- Ector County Constable’s Office
- Edwards County Constable’s Office
- El Paso County Constable’s Office
- Ellis County Constable’s Office
- Erath County Constable’s Office
- Falls County Constable’s Office
- Fannin County Constable’s Office
- Fayette County Constable’s Office
- Fisher County Constable’s Office
- Floyd County Constable’s Office
- Foard County Constable’s Office
- Fort Bend County Constable’s Office
- Franklin County Constable’s Office
- Freestone County Constable’s Office
- Frio County Constable’s Office
- Gaines County Constable’s Office
- Galveston County Constable’s Office
- Garza County Constable’s Office
- Gillespie County Constable’s Office
- Glasscock County Constable’s Office
- Goliad County Constable’s Office
- Gonzales County Constable’s Office
- Gray County Constable’s Office
- Grayson County Constable’s Office
- Gregg County Constable’s Office
- Grimes County Constable’s Office
- Guadalupe County Constable’s Office
- Hale County Constable’s Office
- Hall County Constable’s Office
- Hamilton County Constable’s Office
- Hansford County Constable’s Office
- Hardeman County Constable’s Office
- Hardin County Constable’s Office
- Harris County Constableʼs Office
- Harrison County Constable’s Office
- Hartley County Constable’s Office
- Haskell County Constable’s Office
- Hays County Constable’s Office
- Hemphill County Constable’s Office
- Henderson County Constable’s Office
- Hidalgo County Constable’s Office
- Hill County Constable’s Office
- Hockley County Constable’s Office
- Hood County Constable’s Office
- Hopkins County Constable’s Office
- Houston County Constable’s Office
- Howard County Constable’s Office
- Hudspeth County Constable’s Office
- Hunt County Constable’s Office
- Huntchinson County Constable’s Office
- Irion County Constable’s Office
- Jack County Constable’s Office
- Jackson County Constable’s Office
- Jasper County Constable’s Office
- Jeff Davis County Constable’s Office
- Jefferson County Constable’s Office
- Jim Hogg County Constable’s Office
- Jim Wells County Constable’s Office
- Johnson County Constable’s Office
- Jones County Constable’s Office
- Karnes County Constable’s Office
- Kaufman County Constable’s Office
- Kendall County Constable’s Office
- Kenedy County Constable’s Office
- Kent County Constable’s Office
- Kerr County Constable’s Office
- Kimble County Constable’s Office
- King County Constable’s Office
- Kinney County Constable’s Office
- Kleberg County Constable’s Office
- Knox County Constable’s Office
- La Salle County Constable’s Office
- Lamar County Constable’s Office
- Lamb County Constable’s Office
- Lampasas County Constable’s Office
- Lavaca County Constable’s Office
- Lee County Constable’s Office
- Leon County Constable’s Office
- Liberty County Constable’s Office
- Limestone County Constable’s Office
- Lipscomb County County Sheriff’s Office
- Live Oak County Constable’s Office
- Llano County Constable’s Office
- Loving County Constable’s Office
- Lubbock County Constable’s Office
- Lynn County Constable’s Office
- Madison County Constable’s Office
- Marion County Constable’s Office
- Martin County Constable’s Office
- Mason County Constable’s Office
- Matagorda County Constable’s Office
- Maverick County Constable’s Office
- McCulloch County Constable’s Office
- McLennan County Constable’s Office
- McMullen County Constable’s Office
- Medina County Constable’s Office
- Menard County Constable’s Office
- Midland County Constable’s Office
- Milam County Constable’s Office
- Mills County Constable’s Office
- Mitchell County Constable’s Office
- Montague County Constable’s Office
- Montgomery County Constable’s Office
- Moore County Constable’s Office
- Morris County Constable’s Office
- Motley County Constable’s Office
- Nacogdoches County Constable’s Office
- Navarro County Constable’s Office
- Newton County Constable’s Office
- Nolan County Constable’s Office
- Nueces County Constable’s Office
- Ochiltree County Constable’s Office
- Oldham County Constable’s Office
- Orange County Constable’s Office
- Palo Pinto County Constable’s Office
- Panola County Constable’s Office
- Parker County Constable’s Office
- Parmer County Constable’s Office
- Pecos County Constable’s Office
- Polk County Constable’s Office
- Potter County Constable’s Office
- Presidio County Constable’s Office
- Rains County Constable’s Office
- Randall County Constable’s Office
- Reagan County Constable’s Office
- Real County Constable’s Office
- Red River County Constable’s Office
- Reeves County Constable’s Office
- Refugio County Constable’s Office
- Roberts County Constable’s Office
- Robertson County Constable’s Office
- Rockwall County Constable’s Office
- Runnels County Constable’s Office
- Rusk County Constable’s Office
- Sabine County Constable’s Office
- San Augustine County Constable’s Office
- San Jacinto County Constable’s Office
- San Patricio County Constable’s Office
- San Saba County Constable’s Office
- Schleicher County Constable’s Office
- Scurry County Constable’s Office
- Shakelford County Constable’s Office
- Shelby County Constable’s Office
- Sherman County Constable’s Office
- Smith County Constable’s Office
- Somerville County Constable’s Office
- Starr County Constable’s Office
- Stephens County Constable’s Office
- Sterling County Constable’s Office
- Stonewall County Constable’s Office
- Sutton County Constable’s Office
- Swisher County Constable’s Office
- Tarrant County Constable’s Office
- Taylor County Constable’s Office
- Terrell County Constable’s Office
- Terry County Constable’s Office
- Throckmorton County Constable’s Office
- Titus County Constable’s Office
- Tom Green County Constable’s Office
- Travis County Constable’s Office
- Trinity County Constable’s Office
- Tyler County Constable’s Office
- Upshur County Constable’s Office
- Upton County Constable’s Office
- Uvalde County Constable’s Office
- Val Verde County Constable’s Office
- Van Zandt County Constable’s Office
- Victoria County Constable’s Office
- Walker County Constable’s Office
- Waller County Constable’s Office
- Ward County Constable’s Office
- Washington County Constable’s Office
- Webb County Constable’s Office
- Wharton County Constable’s Office
- Wheeler County Constable’s Office
- Wichita County Constable’s Office
- Willbarger County Constable’s Office
- Willacy County Constable’s Office
- Williamson County Constable’s Office
- Wilson County Constable’s Office
- Winkler County Constable’s Office
- Wise County Constable’s Office
- Wood County Constable’s Office
- Yoakum County Constable’s Office
- Young County Constable’s Office
- Zapata County Constable’s Office
- Zavala County Constable’s Office

== City agencies ==
- Abernathy Police Department
- Abilene Police Department
- Addison Police Department
- Alamo Police Department
- Alamo Heights Police Department
- Albany Police Department
- Alice Police Department
- Allen Police Department
- Alpine Police Department
- Alto Police Department
- Alton Police Department
- Alvarado Police Department
- Alvin Police Department
- Amarillo Police Department
- Andrews Police Department
- Angleton Police Department
- Anson Police Department
- Anthony Police Department
- Aransas Pass Police Department
- Arcola Police Department
- Argyle Police Department
- Arlington Police Department (Texas)
- Athens Police Department
- Atlanta Police Department (Texas)
- Aubrey Police Department
- Austin Police Department
- Azle Police Department
- Balcones Heights Police Department
- Ballinger Police Department
- Bandera Police Department
- Bangs Police Department
- Bardwell Police Department
- Bartlett Police Department
- Bartonville Police Department
- Bastrop Police Department
- Bay City Police Department (Texas)
- Bayou Vista Police Department
- Baytown Police Department (Texas)
- Beaumont Police Department
- Bedford Police Department (Texas)
- Bellaire Police Department
- Bellmead Police Department
- Bellville Police Department
- Belton Police Department
- Benbrook Police Department
- Bertram Police Department
- Beverly Hills Police Department (Texas)
- Big Sandy Police Department
- Big Spring Police Department
- Bishop Police Department
- Blanco Police Department
- Blue Mound Police Department
- Boerne Police Department
- Bogata Police Department
- Bonham Police Department
- Borger Police Department
- Bovina Police Department
- Bowie Police Department (Texas)
- Boyd Police Department
- Brady Police Department
- Brazoria Police Department
- Breckenridge Police Department
- Bremond Police Department
- Brenham Police Department
- Briaroaks Police Department
- Bridge City Police Department
- Bridgeport Police Department (Texas)
- Brookshire Police Department
- Brownfield Police Department
- Brownsboro Police Department
- Brownsville Police Department
- Brownwood Police Department
- Bryan Police Department (Texas)
- Buda Police Department
- Buffalo Police Department (Texas)
- Bulverde Police Department
- Burkburnett Police Department
- Burleson Police Department
- Burnet Police Department
- Cactus Police Department
- Caddo Mills Police Department
- Caldwell Police Department
- Calvert Police Department
- Cameron Police Department
- Camp Wood Police Department
- Caney City Police Department
- Canton Police Department
- Canyon Police Department
- Carrollton Police Department
- Carthage Police Department
- Castle Hills Police Department
- Castroville Police Department
- Cedar Hill Police Department
- Cedar Park Police Department
- Celeste Police Department
- Celina Police Department
- Center Police Department
- Chandler Police Department
- Childress Police Department
- Chillicothe Police Department
- China Grove Police Department
- Cibolo Police Department
- Cisco Police Department
- Clarksville Police Department
- Cleburne Police Department
- Cleveland Police Department (Texas)
- Clifton Police Department
- Clint Police Department
- Clute Police Department
- Clyde Police Department
- Cockrell Hill Police Department
- Coffee City Police Department
- Coleman Police Department
- College Station Police Department
- Colleyville Police Department
- Colorado City Police Department (Texas)
- Columbus Police Department
- Comanche Police Department
- Combine Police Department
- Commerce Police Department
- Como Police Department
- Conroe Police Department
- Converse Police Department
- Coppell Police Department
- Copper Canyon Police Department
- Copperas Cove Police Department
- Corinth Police Department
- Corpus Christi Police Department
- Corrigan Police Department
- Corsicana Police Department
- Crandall Police Department
- Crane Police Department
- Crockett Police Department
- Crosbyton Police Department
- Cross Plains Police Department
- Cross Roads Police Department
- Crowley Police Department
- Crystal City Police Department
- Cuero Police Department
- Cuney Police Department
- Daingerfield Police Department
- Daisetta Police Department
- Dalhart Police Department
- Dallas Police Department
- Dalworthington Gardens Department of Public Safety
- Danbury Police Department
- Dayton Police Department
- De Kalb Police Department
- De Leon Police Department
- DeSoto Police Department
- Decatur Police Department
- Deer Park Police Department
- Del Rio Police Department
- Denison Police Department
- Denton Police Department
- Denver City Police Department
- Devine Police Department
- Diboll Police Department
- Dickinson Police Department
- Dilley Police Department
- Dimmitt Police Department
- Donna Police Department
- Double Oak Police Department
- Driscoll Police Department
- Dublin Police Department
- Dumas Police Department
- Duncanville Police Department
- Eagle Lake Police Department
- Eagle Pass Police Department
- Early Police Department
- Earth Police Department
- East Mountain Police Department
- East Tawakoni Police Department
- Eastland Police Department
- Edcouch Police Department
- Edgewood Police Department
- Edinburg Police Department
- Edna Police Department
- El Campo Police Department
- El Paso Police Department
- Electra Police Department
- Elgin Police Department
- Elmendorf Police Department
- Elm Ridge Police Department
- Elsa Police Department
- Ennis Police Department
- Estelline Police Department
- Euless Police Department
- Eustace Police Department
- Everman Police Department
- Fair Oaks Ranch Police Department
- Fairfield Police Department
- Falfurrias Police Department
- Farmers Branch Police Department
- Farmersville Police Department
- Farwell Police Department
- Ferris Police Department
- Flatonia Police Department
- Florence Police Department
- Floresville Police Department
- Flower Mound Police Department
- Floydada Police Department
- Forest Hill Police Department
- Forney Police Department
- Fort Stockton Police Department
- Fort Worth Police Department
- Franklin Police Department
- Frankston Police Department
- Fredericksburg Police Department
- Freeport Police Department
- Freer Police Department
- Friendswood Police Department
- Friona Police Department
- Frisco Police Department
- Fritch Police Department
- Frost Police Department
- Gainesville Police Department
- Galena Park Police Department
- Galveston Police Department
- Ganado Police Department
- Garden Ridge Police Department
- Garland Police Department
- Garrett Police Department
- Gatesville Police Department
- George West Police Department
- Georgetown Police Department
- Giddings Police Department
- Gilmer Police Department
- Gladewater Police Department
- Glenn Heights Police Department
- Godley Police Department
- Gonzales Police Department
- Gorman Police Department
- Graham Police Department
- Granbury Police Department
- Grand Prairie Police Department
- Grand Saline Police Department
- Grandview Police Department
- Granger Police Department
- Granite Shoals Police Department
- Grapevine Police Department
- Greenville Police Department
- Gregory Police Department
- Grey Forrest Police Department
- Groesbeck Police Department
- Groves Police Department
- Groveton Police Department
- Gun Barrel City Police Department
- Gunter Police Department
- Hale Center Police Department
- Hallettsville Police Department
- Hallsville Police Department
- Haltom City Police Department
- Hamlin Police Department
- Harker Heights Police Department
- Harlingen Police Department
- Hart Police Department
- Haskell Police Department
- Hawk Cove Police Department
- Hawkins Police Department
- Hawley Police Department
- Hearne Police Department
- Hedwig Village Police Department
- Helotes Police Department
- Hemphill Police Department
- Hempstead Police Department
- Henderson Police Department
- Hereford Police Department
- Hewitt Police Department
- Hickory Creek Police Department
- Hico Police Department
- Hidalgo Police Department
- Highland Village Police Department
- Hill Country Village Police Department
- Hillsboro Police Department
- Hitchcock Police Department
- Holland Police Department
- Holliday Police Department
- Hollywood Park Police Department
- Hondo Police Department
- Honey Grove Police Department
- Hooks Police Department
- Horizon City Police Department
- Houston Police Department
- Howe Police Department
- Hubbard Police Department
- Hudson Police Department
- Hudson Oaks Police Department
- Hughes Springs Police Department
- Humble Police Department
- Huntsville Police Department
- Hurst Police Department
- Hutchins Police Department
- Hutto Police Department
- Idalou Police Department
- Ingleside Police Department
- Ingram Police Department
- Iowa Park Police Department
- Irving Police Department
- Italy Police Department
- Itasca Police Department
- Jacinto City Police Department
- Jacksboro Police Department
- Jacksonville Police Department
- Jamaica Beach Police Department
- Jarrel Police Department
- Jasper Police Department
- Jefferson Police Department
- Jersey Village Police Department
- Jewett Police Department
- Johnson City Police Department
- Jonestown Police Department
- Josephine Police Department
- Joshua Police Department
- Jourdanton Police Department
- Junction Police Department
- Justin Police Department
- Karnes City Police Department
- Katy Police Department
- Kaufman Police Department
- Keene Police Department
- Keller Police Department
- Kemah Police Department
- Kemp Police Department
- Kempner Police Department
- Kenedy Police Department
- Kennedale Police Department
- Kerens Police Department
- Kermit Police Department
- Kerrville Police Department
- Kilgore Police Department
- Killeen Police Department
- Kingsville Police Department
- Kirby Police Department
- Kirbyville Police Department
- Knox City Police Department
- Kountze Police Department
- Krugerville Police Department
- Krum Police Department
- Kyle Police Department
- La Coste Police Department
- La Feria Police Department
- La Grange Police Department
- La Grulla Police Department
- La Marque Police Department
- La Porte Police Department
- Lacy-Lakeview Police Department
- Lago Vista Police Department
- Laguna Vista Police Department
- Lake Dallas Police Department
- Lake Jackson Police Department
- Lake Worth Police Department
- Lakeway Police Department
- Lamesa Police Department
- Lampasas Police Department
- Lancaster Police Department
- Laredo Police Department
- League City Police Department
- Leander Police Department
- Leon Valley Police Department
- Leonard Police Department
- Levelland Police Department
- Lewisville Police Department
- Lexington Police Department
- Liberty Police Department
- Liberty Hill Police Department
- Lindale Police Department
- Linden Police Department
- Little Elm Police Department
- Little River-Academy Police Department
- Littlefield Police Department
- Live Oak Police Department
- Liverpool Police Department
- Livingston Police Department
- Llano Police Department
- Lockhart Police Department
- Lockney Police Department
- Log Cabin Police Department (Texas)
- Lometa Police Department
- Lone Oak Police Department
- Lone Star Police Department
- Longview Police Department
- Loraine Police Department
- Lorena Police Department
- Lorenzo Police Department
- Los Fresnos Police Department
- Lott Police Department
- Lubbock Police Department
- Lufkin Police Department
- Luling Police Department
- Lumberton Police Department
- Lytle Police Department
- Mabank Police Department
- Madisonville Police Department
- Malakoff Police Department
- Mansfield Police Department
- Manvel Police Department
- Marble Falls Police Department
- Marfa Police Department
- Marion Police Department
- Marlin Police Department
- Marshall Police Department
- Marshall Creek Police Department
- Mathis Police Department
- Maypearl Police Department
- McAllen Police Department
- McGregor Police Department
- McKinney Police Department
- Meadows Place Police Department
- Melissa Police Department
- Memphis Police Department
- Mercedes Police Department
- Meridian Police Department
- Merkel Police Department
- Mesquite Police Department
- Mexia Police Department
- Midland Police Department
- Midlothian Police Department
- Miles Police Department
- Milford Police Department
- Mineola Police Department
- Mineral Wells Police Department
- Mission Police Department
- Missouri City Police Department
- Monahans Police Department
- Mont Belvieu Police Department
- Moody Police Department
- Moulton Police Department
- Mount Pleasant Police Department
- Mount Vernon Police Department
- Muleshoe Police Department
- Munday Police Department
- Murphy Police Department
- Mustang Ridge Police Department
- Nacogdoches Police Department
- Naples Police Department
- Nash Police Department
- Nassau Bay Police Department
- Natalia Police Department
- Navasota Police Department
- Nederland Police Department
- Needville Police Department
- New Boston Police Department
- New Braunfels Police Department
- New Summerfield Police Department
- Newton Police Department
- Nocona Police Department
- Nolanville Police Department
- North Richland Hills Police Department
- Northlake Police Department
- Oak Point Police Department
- Oak Ridge North Police Department
- Oakwood Police Department
- Odessa Police Department
- O'Donnell Police Department
- Olmos Park Police Department
- Olney Police Department
- Olton Police Department
- Omaha Police Department
- Orange Police Department
- Ore City Police Department
- Overton Police Department
- Ovilla Police Department
- Oyster Creek Police Department
- Palacios Police Department
- Palestine Police Department
- Palmer Police Department
- Palmhurst Police Department
- Palmview Police Department
- Pampa Police Department
- Panhandle Police Department
- Panorama Police Department
- Paris City Police Department
- Parker Police Department
- Pasadena Police Department
- Patton Village Police Department
- Pearland Police Department
- Pearsall Police Department
- Pecos Police Department
- Pelican Bay Police Department
- Perryton Police Department
- Petersburg Police Department
- Pflugerville Police Department
- Pharr Police Department
- Pilot Point Police Department
- Pine Forest Police Department
- Pineland Police Department
- Pittsburg Police Department
- Plainview Police Department
- Plano Police Department
- Pleasanton Police Department
- Point Comfort Police Department
- Ponder Police Department
- Port Aransas Police Department
- Port Arthur Police Department
- Port Isabel Police Department
- Port Lavaca Police Department
- Port Neches Police Department
- Portland Police Department
- Poteet Police Department
- Poth Police Department
- Prairie View Police Department
- Premont Police Department
- Presidio Police Department
- Princeton Police Department
- Progreso Police Department
- Prosper Police Department
- Quitman Police Department
- Ralls Police Department
- Ranger Police Department
- Ransom Canyon Police Department
- Raymondville Police Department
- Red Oak Police Department
- Refugio Police Department
- Recklaw Police Department
- Reno Police Department
- Rhome Police Department
- Richardson Police Department
- Richland Hills Police Department
- Richmond Police Department
- Richwood Police Department
- Riesel Police Department
- Rio Grande City Police Department
- Rio Hondo Police Department
- Rising Star Police Department
- River Oaks Police Department
- Roanoke Police Department
- Robinson Police Department
- Robstown Police Department
- Rockdale Police Department
- Rockport Police Department
- Rockwall Police Department
- Rogers Police Department
- Rollingwood Police Department
- Roman Forest Police Department
- Roma Police Department
- Ropesvile Police Department
- Roscoe Police Department
- Rose Hill Acres Police Department
- Rosebud Police Department
- Rosenburg Police Department
- Round Rock Police Department
- Rowlett Police Department
- Royse City Police Department
- Rule Police Department
- Rusk Police Department
- Sabinal Police Department
- Sasche Police Department
- Saginaw Police Department
- Saint Jo Police Department
- San Angelo Police Department
- San Antonio Police Department
- San Augustine Police Department
- San Benito Police Department
- San Diego Police Department
- San Juan Police Department
- San Marcos Police Department
- San Saba Police Department
- Sanger Police Department
- Sansom Park Police Department
- Santa Anna Police Department
- Santa Fe Police Department
- Santa Rosa Police Department
- Savoy Police Department
- Schertz Police Department
- Schulenburg Police Department
- Seabrook Police Department
- Seadrift Police Department
- Seagoville Police Department
- Seagraves Police Department
- Sealy Police Department
- Seguin Police Department
- Selma Police Department
- Seminole Police Department
- Seven Points Police Department
- Seymour Police Department
- Shallowater Police Department
- Shamrock Police Department
- Shavano Park Police Department
- Shenandoah Police Department
- Sherman Police Department
- Shiner Police Department
- Shorearces Police Department
- Silsbee Police Department
- Sinton Police Department
- Slaton Police Department
- Smithville Police Department
- Snyder Police Department
- Socorro Police Department
- Somerset Police Department
- Somerville Police Department
- Sonora Police Department
- Sour Lake Police Department
- South Houston Police Department
- South Padre Island Police Department
- Southlake Department of Public Safety
- Southmayd Police Department
- Southside Place Police Department
- Spearman Police Department
- Splendora Police Department
- Spring Valley Police Department
- Springtown Police Department
- Spur Police Department
- Stafford Police Department
- Stamford Police Department
- Stanton Police Department
- Stephenville Police Department
- Stinnett Police Department
- Stratford Police Department
- Sudan Police Department
- Sugar Land Police Department
- Sulphur Springs Police Department
- Sundown Police Department
- Sunray Police Department
- Sunset Valley Police Department
- Sweeny Police Department
- Sweetwater Police Department
- Taft Police Department
- Tahoka Police Department
- Talty Police Department
- Tatum Police Department
- Taylor Police Department
- Teague Police Department
- Temple Police Department
- Terrell Police Department
- Texarkana Police Department
- Texas City Police Department
- The Colony Police Department
- Thorndale Police Department
- Thrall Police Department
- Three Rivers Police Department
- Tiki Island Police Department
- Tioga Police Department
- Tolar Police Department
- Tom Bean Police Department
- Trinidad Police Department (disbanded)
- Tomball Police Department
- Trinity Police Department
- Trophy Club Police Department
- Troup Police Department
- Troy Police Department
- Tulia Police Department
- Tye Police Department
- Tyler Police Department
- Universal City Police Department
- University Park Police Department
- Uvalde Police Department
- Valley Mills Police Department
- Van Police Department
- Van Alstyne Police Department
- Venus Police Department
- Vernon Police Department
- Victoria Police Department
- Vidor Police Department
- Von Ormy Police Department
- Waco Police Department
- Waedler Police Department
- Wake Village Police Department
- Waller Police Department
- Wallis Police Department
- Watauga Police Department
- Waxahachie Police Department
- Weatherford Police Department
- Webster Police Department
- Weimar Police Department
- Wells Police Department
- Weslaco Police Department
- West Police Department
- West Columbia Police Department
- West Lake Hills Police Department
- West Orange Police Department
- West Tawakoni Police Department
- West University Place Police Department
- Westover Hills Police Department
- Westworth Village Police Department
- Wharton City Police Department
- White Oak Police Department
- White Settlement Police Department
- Whitehouse Police Department
- Whitesboro Police Department
- Whitewright Police Department
- Whitney Police Department
- Wichita Falls Police Department
- Willis Police Department
- Willow Park Police Department
- Wills Point Police Department
- Wilmer Police Department
- Windcrest Police Department
- Winfield Police Department
- Wink Police Department
- Winnsboro Police Department
- Winters Police Department
- Wolfe City Police Department
- Wolfforth Police Department
- Woodsboro Police Department
- Woodville Police Department
- Woodway Police Department
- Wortham Police Department
- Wylie Police Department
- Yoakum Police Department
- Yorktown Police Department

== College and university agencies ==
- Austin college police department, sherman, tx
- Abilene Christian University Police Department
- Alamo Colleges Police Department
- Alvin Community College Police Department
- Amarillo College Police Department
- Angelo State University Police Department
- Austin Community College Police Department
- Baylor University Police Department
- Blinn College Police & Security Department
- Central Texas College Police Department
- College of the Mainland Police Department
- Collin College Police Department
- Concordia University Texas Police Department
- Dallas College Police Department (formerly Dallas County Community College District)
- El Paso Community College Police Department
- Houston Baptist University Police Department
- Houston Community College System Police Department
- Howard Payne University Police Department
- Kilgore College Police Department
- Lamar University Police Department
- Laredo Community College Police Department
- Lone Star College System Police Department
- Lubbock Christian University Police Department
- McLennan Community College Police Department
- Midland College Police Department
- Midwestern State University Police Department
- Odessa College Police Department
- Prairie View A&M University Police
- Rice University Police
- Sam Houston State University Police Department
- San Jacinto College District Police
- Southern Methodist University Police
- Southwestern Christian College (SwCC) Police Department
- Stephen F. Austin State University Police Department
- St. Edward's University Police Department
- St. Mary's University Police Department
- Tarrant County College District Police Department
- Texas A&M University Police Department
- Texas A&M University Corpus Christi Police Department
- Texas A&M University Forest Service Law Enforcement
- Texas A&M University San Antonio Police Department
- Texas A&M International University Police Department
- Texas Christian University Police Department
- Texas Lutheran University Police Department
- Texas Southern University Police Department
- Texas State University–San Marcos Police Department
- Texas State Technical College Police Department
- Texas Tech University Police Department
- Texas Women's University Police Department
- Trinity University Police Department
- Trinity Valley Community College Campus Police
- University of Houston Police Department
- University of Houston–Clear Lake Police Department
- University of Houston–Downtown Police Department
- University of Mary Hardin-Baylor Police Department
- University of North Texas Police Department
- University of North Texas Health Science Center Police Department
- University of St. Thomas Police Department- Houston
- University of Texas at Arlington Police Department
- University of Texas at Austin Police Department
- University of Texas at Dallas Police Department
- University of Texas at El Paso Police Department
- University of Texas at Houston Police Department
- University of Texas Rio Grande Valley
- University of Texas at San Antonio Police Department
- University of Texas of the Permian Basin Police Department
- University of Texas at Tyler Police Department
- University of Texas Medical Branch Police Department
- University of Texas Health Science Center at San Antonio Police Department
- University of Texas Southwestern Medical Center at Dallas Police Department
- Vernon College Police Department
- University of the Incarnate Word Police Department
- Wayland Baptist University Police Department
- Weatherford College Police Department
- West Texas A&M University Police Department

== Independent school district agencies (K–12) ==
- Aldine Independent School District Police
- Aledo Independent School District Police
- Alief Independent School District Police
- Alvin Independent School District Police
- Alvord Independent School District Police
- Amarillo Independent School District Police
- Angleton Independent School District Police
- Anna Independent School District Police
- Aransas County Independent School District Police
- Argyle Independent School District Police
- Aubrey Independent School District Police
- Austin Independent School District Police
- Barber's Hill Independent School District Police
- Bastrop Independent School District Police
- Bay City Independent School District Police
- Beaumont Independent School District Police
- Beeville Independent School District Police
- Blooming Grove Independent School District Police
- Boerne Independent School District Police
- Brazosport Independent School District Police
- Bridge City Independent School District Police
- Brownsboro Independent School District Police
- Brownsville Independent School District Police
- Calhoun County Independent School District Police
- Canutillo Independent School District Police
- Carrizo Springs Independent School District Police
- Cedar Hill Independent School District Police
- Castleberry Independent School District Police
- Center Independent School District Police
- Center Point Independent School District Police
- Central Independent School District Police
- China Spring Independent School District Police
- Cleveland Independent School District Police
- Coldspring-Oakhurst independent School District Police
- Conroe Independent School District Police
- Corpus Christi Independent School District Police
- Corsicana Independent School District Police
- Cypress-Fairbanks Independent School District Police
- Daingerfield-Lone Star Independent School District Police
- Dallas Independent School District Police
- Del Valle Independent School District Police
- Dumas Independent School District Police
- Duncanville Independent School District Police
- Eagle Mountain-Saginaw Independent School District Police
- Eagle Pass Independent School District Police
- East Central Independent School District Police
- Ector County Independent School District Police
- Edinburg Consolidated Independent School District Police
- Edgewood Independent School District Police
- El Paso Independent School District Police
- Ennis Independent School District Police
- Eustace Independent School District Police
- Farmersville Independent School District Police
- Ferris Independent School District Police
- Floresville Independent School District Police
- Flower Mound Independent School District Police
- Fort Bend Independent School District Police
- Fort Sam Houston Independent School District Police
- Frenship Independent School District Police
- Galveston Independent School District Police
- Goose Creek Consolidated Independent School District Police
- Gunter Independent School District Police
- Hallsville Independent School District Police
- Harlandale Independent School District Police
- Hempstead Independent School District Police
- Highland Park Independent School District Police (Amarillo, TX)
- Highland Park Independent School District Police (Dallas, TX)
- Houston Independent School District Police
- Huffman Independent School District Police Department
- Humble Independent School District Police
- Hutto Independent School District Police
- Jacksonville Independent School District Police
- Jefferson Independent School District Police
- Judson Independent School District Police
- Katy Independent School District Police
- Kaufman Independent School District Police
- Keene Independent School District Police
- Kemp Independent School District Police
- Killeen Independent School District Police
- Klein Independent School District Police
- Krum Independent School District Police
- La Joya Independent School District Police
- La Vega Independent School District Police
- Lake Dallas Independent School District Police
- Lake Travis Independent School District Police
- Lamar Consolidated Independent School District Police Department
- Lancaster Independent School District Police
- Laredo Independent School District Police
- Lindale Independent School District Police
- Linden-Kildare Consolidated Independent School District Police
- London Independent School District Police
- Lubbock Independent School District Police
- Lubbock-Cooper Independent School District Police
- Lyford Consolidated Independent School District Police
- Mabank Independent School District Police
- Madisonville Consolidated Independent School District Police
- Manor Independent School District Police
- Mansfield Independent School District Police
- McAllen Independent School District Police
- Medina Independent School District Police
- Melissa Independent School District Police
- Mexia Independent School District Police
- Midland Independent School District Police
- Nacogdoches Independent School District Police
- Needville Independent School District Police
- Normangee Independent School District Police
- North East Independent School District Police
- Northside Independent School District Police
- Pasadena Independent School District Police
- Pflugerville Independent School District Police
- Pittsburg Independent School District Police
- Pleasanton Independent School District Police
- Poteet Independent School District Police
- Presidio Independent School District Police
- Quinlan Independent School District Police
- Raymondville Independent School District Police
- Red Oak Independent School District Police
- Rice Independent School District Police
- Roma Independent School District Police
- Round Rock Independent School District Police
- Royal Independent School District Police
- Saltillo Independent School District Police
- Santa Fe Independent School District Police
- Sanger Independent School District Police
- Santa Maria Independent School District Police
- Santa Rosa Independent School District Police
- San Antonio Independent School District Police
- San Benito Consolidated Independent School District Police
- Shallowater Independent School District Police
- Silsbee Independent School District Police
- Socorro Independent School District Police
- Somerset Independent School District Police
- South San Antonio Independent School District Police
- Southside Independent School District Police
- Southwest Independent School District Police
- Splendora Independent School District Police
- Spring Branch Independent School District Police
- Spring Independent School District Police
- Taft Independent School District Police
- Texarkana Independent School District Police
- Tyler Independent School District Police
- United Independent School District Police
- Uvalde Consolidated Independent School District Police
- Vidor Independent School District Police
- Waco Independent School District Police
- Warren Independent School District Police
- Waskom Independent School District Police
- West Independent School District Police
- West Rusk County Consolidated Independent School District Police
- Wharton Independent School District Police
- White Settlement Independent School District Police
- Yantis Independent School District Police
- Zavalla Independent School District Police
- Zapata County Independent School District Police

== Other agencies ==
=== Airport agencies ===
- Amarillo Airport Police
- Corpus Christi International Airport Public Safety Department
- DFW International Airport Department of Public Safety https://www.dfwairport.com/dps/
- Laredo International Airport Police
- Lubbock Airport Police
- San Angelo Regional Airport Police Force
- San Antonio Airport Police https://www.sanantonio.gov/Airport-Police

=== Charter school agencies ===
- A+ Charter Schools Police

=== Hospital agencies ===
- Baylor Scott & White Health Police
- Bexar County Hospital District Police
- Dallas County Hospital District Police
- Ector County Hospital District Police
- Methodist Health System Police
- Tarrant County Hospital District Police Department
- Texas Health Police Department
- Texas Medical Center Police
- UMC Health System Lubbock Police

=== Park, river authority, and water district agencies ===
- Brazos River Authority Police
- Denton County Water District Police Department
- Lower Colorado River Authority Police
- San Antonio Park Police
- Tarrant Regional Water District Police
- Travis County Park Police

=== Port agencies ===
- Port of Beaumont Police
- Port of Brownsville Police
- Port of Corpus Christi Police
- Port of Galveston Police
- Port of Houston Authority Police

=== Railroad agencies ===
- Burlington Northern Santa Fe Railroad Police
- Port Terminal Railroad Association Police
- Union Pacific Railroad Police Department

=== Transit authority agencies ===
- Capital Metropolitan Transportation Authority Police Department
- Dallas Area Rapid Transit (DART) Police
- Houston Metro Transit Authority Police
- VIA Metropolitan Transit Police (San Antonio)
