= Valley Ranch, Irving, Texas =

The Valley Ranch Association
- Nickname: Valley Ranch
- Interactive map of The Valley Ranch Association
- Coordinates: 32.928324°N 96.951721°W
- Country: United States
- State: Texas
- Counties: Dallas
- City: Irving
- Elevation: 479 ft (146 m)
- Website: https://valleyranch.org/

Valley Ranch is a master-planned development in the Dallas, Texas suburb of Irving. The name comes from the fact that the land it sits upon was formerly a working cattle ranch and is located below a large ridge, and thus resembles a valley.

== History ==
Like much of the rest of Irving, the Valley Ranch development was formerly ranch land and largely undeveloped. However, the introduction of the I-635 loop around Dallas created the opportunity for development of this land into a signature residential and commercial development like Las Colinas to the south. As the highway was being built westward in the 1970s, local Irving officials were determining how to maximize the potential of the city north of the new interstate highway. When the highway was joined to 121 and 635 loop in the 1980s, the area development began to soar and continued well into the 2010s.

With Irving being the home of the old Texas Stadium, it is not surprising that nearby Valley Ranch formerly hosted the practice facilities of the Dallas Cowboys football team (beginning in 1985) who moved to Frisco, Texas, in 2016, and the Dallas Stars hockey team, who have also since moved to Frisco.

Today, a large number of Asian Indians live in Valley Ranch and Las Colinas, and as a result, there are many Indian grocery stores with locations in or adjacent to Valley Ranch. Additionally, there are dozens of restaurants offering Indian cuisine about the area.

== Geography ==
The area lies in the Trinity River floodplain; however, an extensive levee system on its eastern side separates the river from land, thus making it desirable for development. In order to maintain flood control and to provide recreation facilities for residents, Valley Ranch has many winding canals with walkways throughout.

Valley Ranch is bordered by Coppell, TX to the north and Las Colinas, Irving, TX to the south. It is bordered by Cypress Waters, Dallas, TX to the west and Farmers Branch, TX to the east. It is located in close proximity to the Dallas-Fort Worth International Airport and is approximately a 30-minute drive from downtown Dallas. Its southern border is formed by Interstate 635.

== Recreation ==
The Valley Ranch planned community has over five miles of winding, landscaped canal walkways and ponds with parks and an aquatic center. Cimarron Park is the key Irving city park located within Valley Ranch. This recreational area offers a gymnasium, tennis courts, two basketball courts, outdoor swimming pool and large field for soccer or other activities. It further offers playground equipment and a covered picnic area with barbecue pit. One may also access this site by trail.

== Government ==
The Valley Ranch Association affairs are governed by the Master, Residential and Commercial board of directors. Each board consists of five volunteers who serve two-year terms. The Master board members are appointed by the Residential and Commercial board members. The Residential and Commercial board members are elected by members of the association. Ultimately, these members report to the city of Irving municipal government.

== Education ==
Though technically a part of the city of Irving, Texas, children in Valley Ranch will attend schools in either the Coppell ISD or the Carrollton-Farmers Branch ISD.

=== Schools ===
- Bernice Chatman Freeman Elementary (Carrollton-Farmers Branch ISD)
- Canyon Ranch Elementary (Coppell ISD)
- Tom Landry Elementary (Carrollton-Farmers Branch ISD)
- Valley Ranch Elementary (Coppell ISD)
- Barbara Bush Middle School (Carrollton-Farmers Branch ISD)
- Ranchview High School (Carrollton-Farmers Branch ISD)
