= The Saint Anthony School =

School in Texas, United States

Coordinates: 32.970073°N 96.906541°W

The St. Anthony School - Carrollton, Texas is a secular, accredited therapeutic school located in Carrollton Texas. The school is one of several private schools in the area. The St Anthony School specializes in Dyslexia, Attention Deficit Disorder, Bi-polar disorder, school phobia, Anxiety, Depression, and Spectrum disorder. The St Anthony School is accredited with the Texas Alliance of Accredited Private Schools. The St Anthony School is listed in D Magazine (owned by American Express)which was “named the ‘Best City Magazine’ in the nation three times by the City and Regional Magazine Association”, as one of the top schools in the Dallas Fort Worth area for children with special needs and specializing in alternative learning. The St. Anthony School was voted the Best Private School in Carrollton by Star Local Media's Reader's Choice in 2023.

== History ==
The St Anthony School was founded in 1998 by Tony Cinquepalmi. The school is run by Tony Cinquepalmi, along with a variety of licensed therapists, experienced special education teachers, and behavioral specialists.

== Intermediate & Middle School ==
The Intermediate school at St. Anthony's serves grades 3-5, and the Middle School serves grades 6-8. Each student's curriculum is individualized and is based upon academic and cognitive testing with learning styles identified and then an individual plan created

== High School ==
St. Anthony's High School consists of grades 9 through 12. Each student is placed in an individualized curriculum after testing their abilities and academic needs. High school students have the opportunity to participate in our Dual-Credit Program, where they can receive both high school and college credit through Collin College.

== The Momentum Program ==
The St. Anthony School offers a post-grad transitional program designed to provide support to high school graduates as they navigate their next stage of life. The Momentum Program provides the education, guidance, and life-management skills needed for independent living.
