= Trinity Mills, Texas =

Former community in Dallas County, Texas

Coordinates: 32°58′53″N 96°55′39″W

Trinity Mills was a small community originally settled in 1853 on land that today is part of the city of Carrollton in northwest Dallas County, Texas, United States.

The community was on A. W. Perry's land grant and was named for a gristmill owned by him and Wade H. Witt. The actual gristmill was powered by oxen on a treadwheel and housed in a late-1840s two-story rock structure built on Farmers Creek, 2 miles (3 km) northwest of Carrollton. In 1858, a post office was established in the area, which was subsequently shut-down and reopened four times before it finally closed permanently in 1915.

In 1878 the Dallas-Wichita Railroad was built through Trinity Mills and the community began to emerge as a cattle-shipping center. By 1881, Trinity Mills had a physician, 26 farmers, a druggist, and a general store. In 1884, the population of Trinity Mills had grown to 150 along with a school, two churches, and a Western Union telegraph office.

By 1890 the population had dwindled to fifty, and by 1915 only two stores remained in the community. By 1930 the population had dropped to 35. Eventually, the town was annexed into Carrollton and today is fully developed as part of the Dallas-Fort Worth Metroplex.

The City of Carrollton has plans to focus new development into the area near the new DART Green Line Station, detailed in their Master Plan. The City of Carrollton and DART own over 25 acres of land at the station and plan to develop the property into the new Trinity Mills. Much of this land was gained through eminent domain proceedings, in a court of record.
