= Dallas College =

Community college system in Dallas County, Texas, U.S.

- Motto: Education That Works.
- Type: Public community college
- Established: 1965
- Academic affiliations: CONAHEC
- Chancellor: Justin Lonon
- Academic staff: 885 full-time and 1,453 part-time (fall 2022)
- Administrative staff: 3,996 (fall 2015)
- Undergraduates: 64,156 (fall 2023)
- Location: Dallas, Irving, Farmers Branch, Lancaster, Mesquite, Richardson, and Garland, Texas, United States
- Campus: Urban
- Website: www.dallascollege.edu

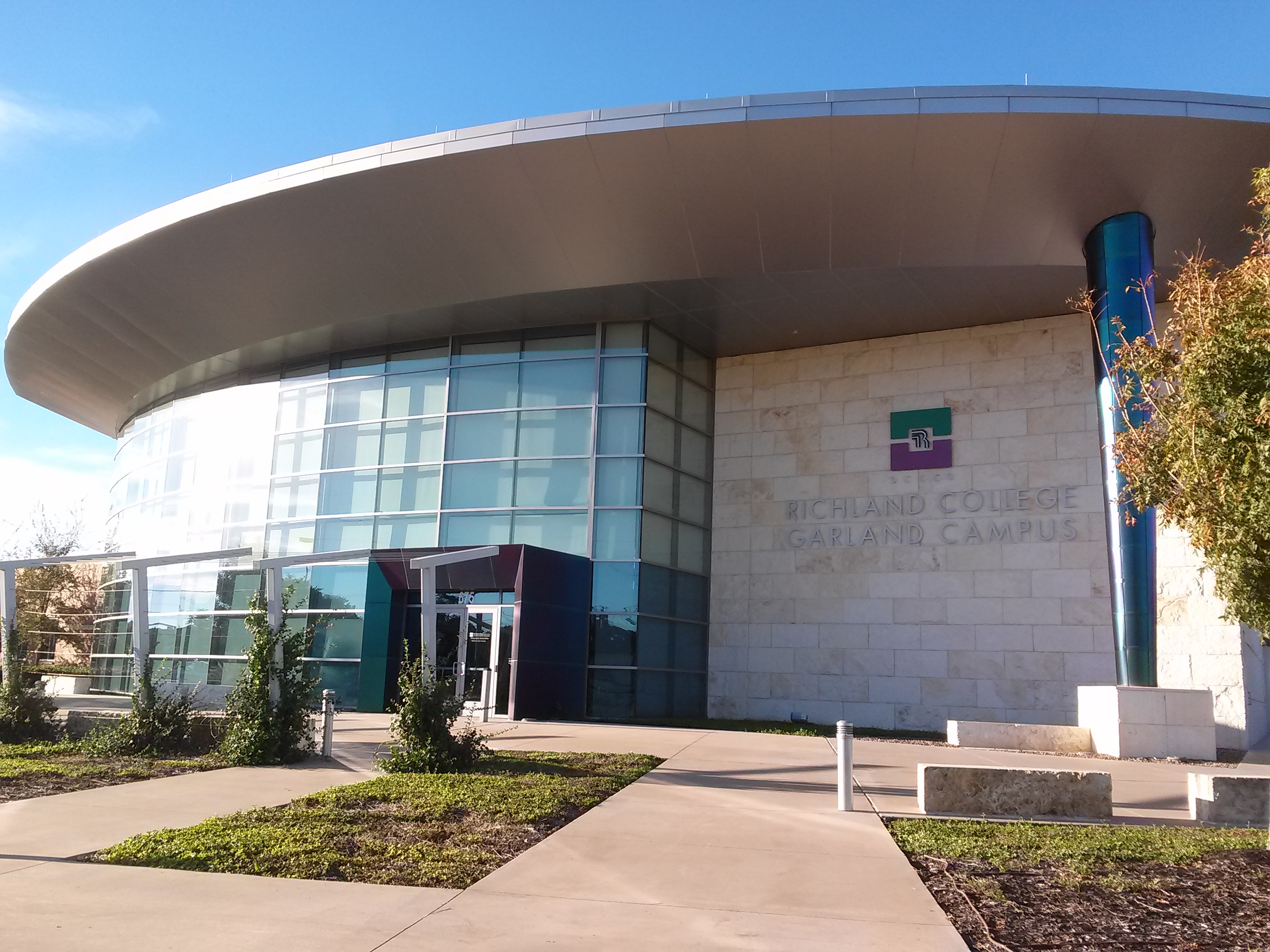
Dallas College Garland Center

Dallas College is a public community college with seven campuses in Dallas County, Texas. It serves more than 70,000 students annually in degree-granting, continuing education, and adult education programs.

Dallas College offers associate degree and career/technical certificate programs in more than 100 areas of study, as well as bachelor's degrees in education, business, nursing, and software development. It is one of the largest community college systems in Texas.

== History ==
Dallas College was founded as the Dallas County Junior College District in 1965, and became known as the Dallas County Community College District (DCCCD) in 1972. The first campus, El Centro College, was established in 1966 in downtown Dallas. Bill J. Priest served as the founding chancellor from 1965 until his retirement in 1981.

=== Consolidation ===
In February 2020, the Dallas County Community College District announced a plan to consolidate its seven constituent institutions, which at the time were separately accredited, into one accredited institution with multiple campuses. The move was primarily aimed at simplifying the enrollment process and graduation requirements. Students originally needed to complete at least 25% of credits at one campus; the merger removed this requirement.

The merger was approved by accreditor SACSCOC on June 12, 2020. In tandem, the district changed its name to Dallas College, repositioning its former constituent institutions as campuses (e.g., Brookhaven College became Dallas College Brookhaven Campus).

The merger was controversial among faculty, as it resulted in layoffs, changes to campus culture, and a more centralized governance structure. In particular, the college eliminated its rolling three-year faculty contracts in favor of one-year contracts, which substantially weakened job security for full-time faculty. In October 2021, roughly a year after the consolidation, full-time faculty passed a resolution of no confidence against then-chancellor Dr. Joe May.

== Service area ==
As defined by the Texas Legislature, the official service area of Dallas College consists of Dallas County and the Carrollton-Farmers Branch Independent School District, a portion of which is in adjacent Denton County.

Dallas College maintains an "open-door" admissions policy regarding new students, allowing many people to attend college who otherwise might not be able to do so.

== Campuses ==
Dallas College main campuses

Dallas College has seven primary campuses. Prior to the 2020 consolidation, each of these institutions were separately accredited.

#	Campus	Opened	City/neighborhood	Mascot	Colors
1	Brookhaven	1978	Farmers Branch	Bears	
2	Cedar Valley	1977	Lancaster	Suns	
3	Eastfield	1970	Mesquite	Harvester Bees	
4	El Centro	1966	Downtown Dallas	Eagles	
5	Mountain View	1970	Oak Cliff, Dallas	Lions	
6	North Lake	1977	Las Colinas, Irving	Blazers	
7	Richland	1972	Lake Highlands, Dallas	Thunderducks	

=== Centers ===
In addition to the seven campuses, Dallas College has centers which either serve surrounding communities or are used for specific purposes. Prior to the 2020 consolidation, each center was associated with a specific campus.

Center	City/neighborhood
Bill J. Priest	Deep Ellum, Dallas
Cedar Hill	Cedar Hill
Coppell	Coppell
Culinary, Pastry and Hospitality	Northwest Dallas
Downtown Design	Downtown Dallas
Downtown Health Sciences	Downtown Dallas
Garland	Garland
Irving	Irving
Lancaster Workplace Development	Oak Cliff, Dallas
Pleasant Grove	Pleasant Grove, Dallas
South Dallas Training	South Dallas
West Dallas	West Dallas
Workforce	Redbird, Dallas

== Administration ==
The Dallas College board of trustees consists of seven members who are entrusted with governing the district. The board defines the vision of the district, serves as a liaison between the district and the community, approves annual budgets and sets policies, among other responsibilities. Board members are elected officials who serve six-year terms without compensation.
