= University of Houston Police Department =

- Patch of the University of Houston Police Department

- Badge of the University of Houston Police Department
- Abbreviation: UHPD

Agency overview
- Formed: September 5th, 1967

Operational structure
- Headquarters: 4051 Wheeler Street; Houston, Texas 77204
- Agency executive: Ceaser Moore, Jr., Chief of Police
- Parent agency: University of Houston Department of Public Safety (UHDPS)

Website
- www.uh.edu/police

The University of Houston Police Department (UHPD) is the campus police for the University of Houston. The officers of UHPD are peace officers of the State of Texas whose primary jurisdiction is any county in which the University of Houston owns, leases, rents, or controls property. Their authority is derived from the Texas Education Code Sec. 51.203 which allows the University of Houston System Board of Regents to employ and commission peace officers. The University of Houston Police Department serves as a division of the University of Houston Department of Public Safety (UHDPS). Its headquarters are at 4051 Wheeler Street (changed from 3869 Wheeler Street in July 2015 in a campus address reorganization) at the southwest corner of the University of Houston campus in the Stadium District.

The current Chief of police is Ceaser Moore, Jr.

== Fallen officers ==
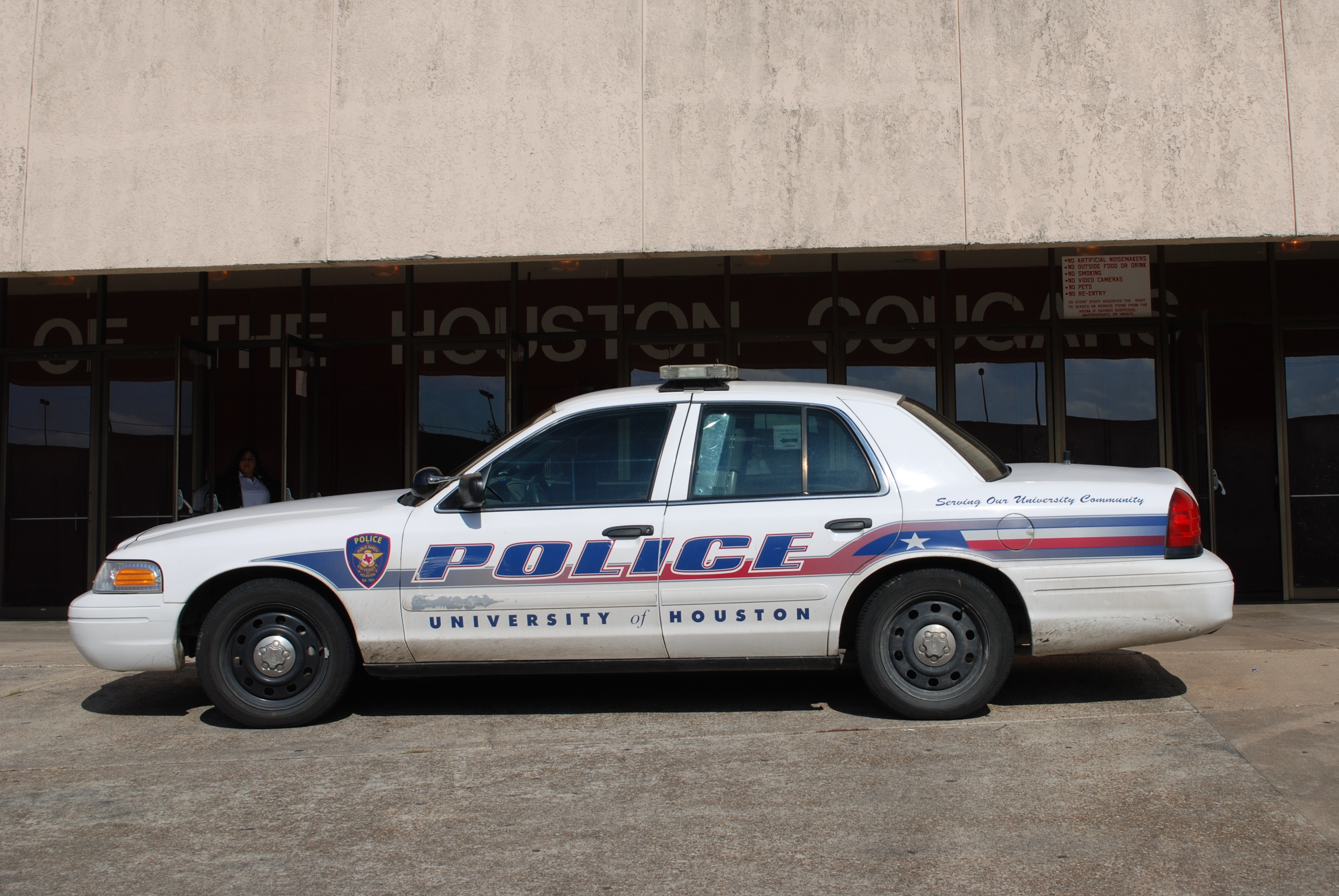
A University of Houston Police vehicle at Hofheinz Pavilion

There has been one UHPD officer who has died while on duty.

== See also ==
- List of law enforcement agencies in Texas
