= Mesquite Police Department (Texas) =

- Abbreviation: MPD

Agency overview
- Annual budget: $45.42 million

Jurisdictional structure
- Operations jurisdiction: Mesquite, Texas, USA
- Area: 46.2 square miles (120 km^{2})
- Population: 143,484 (2013)
- General nature: Local civilian police

Operational structure
- Headquarters: Mesquite, Texas
- Officers: 327
- Agency executive: David Gill, Chief of Police

Website
- Mesquite Police Department

The Mesquite Police Department is the local law enforcement agency of the city of Mesquite, Texas. The department divides the city into nine police districts. The department has four bureaus, each headed by a deputy chief: Technical Services, Staff Support, Operations, and Criminal Investigations.

== Misconduct ==
On March 3, 2011, Sergeant John David McAllister was arrested by FBI agents. McAllister, who headed the department’s narcotics unit was photographed stealing money he thought was from an arrest. On June 20, 2011, he agreed to a plea bargain and was sentenced to 15 months in federal prison for having stolen $2,000.

On August 31, 2012, an officer from nearby Garland, Texas, pursued a suspect into Mesquite, where he rammed his patrol car into the suspect’s truck, stopping it. The officer then fired 41 shots at the unarmed man, killing him. Press reports indicate Mesquite officers investigating the case seized a cellphone camera used by a witness to record the attempted arrest. When the camera was returned, the owner claimed the footage was deleted. A former employee of the City of Mesquite, Information Technology Department admitted to deleting the video in order to obtain special favors from the Mesquite Police Department.

== See also ==
- List of law enforcement agencies in Texas
