= Farmers Branch Police Department =

Police department in Texas, U.S.

Agency overview
- Formed: c. 1850

Jurisdictional structure
- Operations jurisdiction: Farmers Branch, Texas, United States
- Area: 12 square miles (31 km^{2})
- Population: 40,209 (2018 estimate)
- Legal jurisdiction: Farmers Branch

Operational structure
- Headquarters: 3723 Valley View Lane, Farmers Branch, Texas
- Agency executive: Kevin McCoy, Chief of Police

Website
- farmersbranchtx.gov/137/Police-Department

The Farmers Branch Police Department operates in Farmers Branch, Texas, a suburb of Dallas, Texas with a population of about forty thousand people.

The chief is Kevin McCoy. The department has two divisions, Patrol, and Support Services Division. The Department has a bike patrol, and police dog unit. It also operates a jail with sixteen officers assigned. The jail is a short-term lockup that holds prisoners for less than three days.

One of the department's officers has died in the line of duty. In August 1983, Officer Lowell Clayton Tribble was shot from ambush and killed. Although a suspect was charged, the case is still unsolved.

In November 2007, the department conducted a series of police raids on Unique Performance properties. Unique Performance was a company in Farmers Branch that built Carroll Shelby-licensed "Eleanor" Mustangs and Chip Foose 1969 Camaros. However, several customers complained that they had paid for cars and not received them. The department seized sixty-one vehicles that had tampered Vehicle Identification Numbers. Unique Performance declared bankruptcy a week later.

Since 2012, Farmers Branch together with the cities of Addison, Carrollton, and Coppell has jointly operated the NorTex Metro SWAT unit.

In March 2013, an off-duty police officer, Ken Johnson, shot two boys who were breaking into his car. He chased the two in his car, crashing into theirs and then fired eighteen shots, killing one of the two. In 2018, he was found guilty of murder and sentenced to ten years in confinement. The incident was captured on video not controlled by the police.

In June 2019, one of the department's officers, Michael Dunn, was indicted for murder after he killed an unarmed man who was driving a stolen truck. The shooting was caught on video not controlled by the police.
