= Comal County Sheriff's Office =

- Abbreviation: CCSO

Agency overview
- Formed: 1846

Jurisdictional structure
- Operations jurisdiction: Comal, Texas, United States
- Map of Comal County Sheriff's Office's jurisdiction
- Area: 575 sqmi
- Population: 201,628
- Legal jurisdiction: Comal County, Texas
- Constituting instrument: Yes
- General nature: Civilian police

Operational structure
- Headquarters: New Braunfels, Texas
- Sheriff responsible: Mark Reynolds

Website
- http://www.co.comal.tx.us/so/index.html

The Comal County Sheriff's Office is a law enforcement agency headquartered in New Braunfels Texas, with county wide jurisdiction.

The agency is headed by the Sheriff who is elected to office every four years by the citizens of Comal County. The current Sheriff of Comal County is Mark Reynolds who has held office since being sworn in on January 1, 2017. Sheriff Reynolds was sworn in for a third term on January 1st, 2025.

== Rank / Structure ==
The Sheriff's Office is organized into four geographic patrol districts and four different divisions within the agency: the Corrections Division, Patrol Division, Criminal Investigations Division and the Support Services Division. Each division is broken up into sub sections to include Transport, Jail floor, Jail booking, Jail bonding / classifications, Courthouse Security, Communications, Auto Theft Task Force, Civil /Warrants, School Resource Officer (SRO) / Community Resource Team, K9, Traffic Enforcement, Training, Direct Deployment Unit (Crime Suppression Unit) Mental Health Unit, Animal Control, Communications, and Narcotics. The Patrol Division is made up of six rotating shifts to include two day shifts, two evening shifts and two night shifts. All specialized units that are not related to investigations or corrections, fall under the umbrella of the Support Services Division along with the Office of Professional Standards (Internal Affairs).

In addition to these regular duty assignments, the Sheriff's Office maintains several special service teams including Special Weapons and Tactics (SWAT), Corrections Emergency Response Team (CERT), Crisis Negotiation Team (CNT), Drone Unit, Honor Guard, and River/ Lake patrol.

Generally at least one years of service as a patrolmen or jailer, is required before a Deputy or Corrections Officer is eligible for promotion or assignment to a specialized unit, however the Sheriff may appoint any person under his command to any position within the agency at any point in time. Promotion to the position of Detective or rank of Corporal and Sergeant are generally based on a written test and oral interview with a review panel while promotion to the rank of Lieutenant or above is generally an appointment made by the Sheriff. Sworn deputies and commissioned corrections officers utilize the same chain of command despite being assigned to separate divisions.

Sheriff - (four gold stars displayed on collar) The highest ranking and only elected member of the agency, the sheriff is a public figure responsible for maintaining the county jail, as well as operating the agency's law enforcement and investigative services provided to the county.

Chief Deputy- (Three gold stars displayed on the collar) The second in command to the sheriff, the Chief Deputy is responsible for running the internal day-to-day operations of the Sheriff's Office. The Chief deputy is appointed by the Sheriff.

Major - (Gold oak leaves displayed on the collar) The rank of Major is reserved for the person holding the position of jail administrator. The jail administrator is responsible for over seeing the day-to-day activities of the deputies and officers assigned to the jail division. The assistant jail administrator holds the rank of Captain within the division and answers directly to the Major.

Captain - (two silver bars displayed on the collar) generally division commanders who report directly to the Chief deputy with the exception of the Captain assigned to the jail division who reports to a Major.

Lieutenant - (one gold bar displayed on the collar) Generally Lieutenants command multiple sections within a division and directly supervise multiple frontline shift supervisors who are assigned to them. Lieutenants usually report directly to their Captains. Lieutenant's may also be responsible for commanding a special service team such as SWAT or CNT.

Sergeant- (Three chevrons displayed on sleeves of uniform) Sergeants are senior shift supervisors responsible for supervising Corporals, Detectives, Deputies or Correction's Officers assigned to them. Sergeants generally report directly to a Lieutenant.

Corporal - (two chevrons displayed on sleeves of uniform) Corporals are junior shift supervisors who oversee deputies / corrections officers assigned to them. Corporals may take command of a shift in the absence of a Sergeant.

Detective - (plain clothed, no insignia) Detectives are investigators assigned to the Criminal Investigation's Division. Detectives are not considered supervisors but share the same pay rate as a corporal. Detective's are directly supervised by sergeants assigned to CID.

Senior Deputy - (one chevron displayed on sleeves of uniform) Deputies or Correction's Officers with at least five years of service to the agency within the division they are assigned to.

Field Training Officer / FTO - (one chevron and a star displayed on sleeves of uniform) - FTO's are responsible for the training and evaluation of probationary deputies / corrections officers, undergoing the field training program. FTO's only have supervisory authority over the probationary deputy / officer assigned to them.

Deputy / Corrections Officer (No insignia) - Deputy or officer who has graduated from the field training program. Reports directly to the Corporal assigned to supervise them.

Probationary Deputy / Corrections Officer - (No insignia) Deputy or officer who is still undergoing field training and who is paired with a Field Training Officer assigned to evaluate / supervise them.

== Equipment ==
All deputies are issued the SIG Sauer P320 9mm handgun as their on duty sidearm and most deputies are also equipped with a red dot modified Colt AR-15 Semi-automatic rifle. Once qualified to do so, Deputies may also carry less lethal department issued weapons such as OC spray, an expandable baton and an Axon X-26 taser. The Sheriff's Office maintains a fleet of law enforcement modified Chevy Tahoes and Ford Explorers for deputies to operate. Deputies are currently permitted to take their vehicles home with them as long as they reside within the allotted mile radius set by the agency.

== History ==
Notable Incidents

On 08/20/2020, Comal County Warrants Unit Deputy, Eddy Luna, was shot in the line of duty while attempting to serve a Felony Arrest warrant for Brian Scott Sharp, at a his home in Spring Branch, TX. Luna survived the shooting however his right arm was shredded by a shotgun blast from Sharp and later partially amputated after multiple surgeries. Sharp was taken into custody and later convicted of attempted capital murder of a police officer for his actions. The incident gained National attention and brought about support for Luna from all over the United States.

List of Comal County County Sheriff's

- Sheriff Henry Gerwin: served 1846-1848 (self-appointed)
- Sheriff Adam Maurer: served 1848-1849
- Sheriff Arnold Hueckel: served 1849-1850
- Sheriff Anton Pieper: served 1850-1851
- Sheriff George Ullrich: served 1851-1856
- Sheriff Julius Bose: served 1856-1858
- Sheriff George Ullrich: served 1858-1860
- Sheriff Daniel Wiskemann: served 1860-1864
- Sheriff Charles Wiegreffe: served 1864-1866
- Sheriff William Schmidt: served 1866-1873
- Sheriff Charles Saur: served 1873-1876
- Sheriff George H. Schmidt: served 1876-1882
- Sheriff Julius W. Halm: served 1882-1898
- Sheriff Peter Nowotny Sr.: served 1898-1908
- Sheriff W.H. Adams: served 1908-1920
- Sheriff Peter Nowotny Jr.: served 1920-1930
- Sheriff August Knetsch: served 1930-1936
- Sheriff Elmo Arnold: served 1936-1940
- Sheriff W.A. Scholl: served 1940-1948
- Sheriff Ed Schleyer: served 1948-1952
- Sheriff Walter Fellers: served 1952-1988
- Sheriff Jack Bremer: served 1988-1996
- Sheriff Bob Holder: served 1997-2016
- Sheriff Mark Reynolds: served 2017–present

== Fallen deputies ==
Since the establishment of the Comal County Sheriff's Office, 5 deputies have died in the line of duty.

Deputy	Date of death	Details
Deputy Henry Benoit	Monday, August 7, 1916	Train
Deputy Alfred Otto Fischer	Saturday, March 10, 1917	Gunfire
Investigator Elvis (Ed) Murphy	Monday, September 21, 1981	Aircraft Accident
Deputy William J. (Bill) Urban	Monday, February 7, 1994	Heart Attack
Deputy Ray E. Horn	Thursday, January 17, 2019	Heart Attack

== See also ==
- List of law enforcement agencies in Texas
- Sheriff
