= Carrollton, Texas =

City in the United States

- City
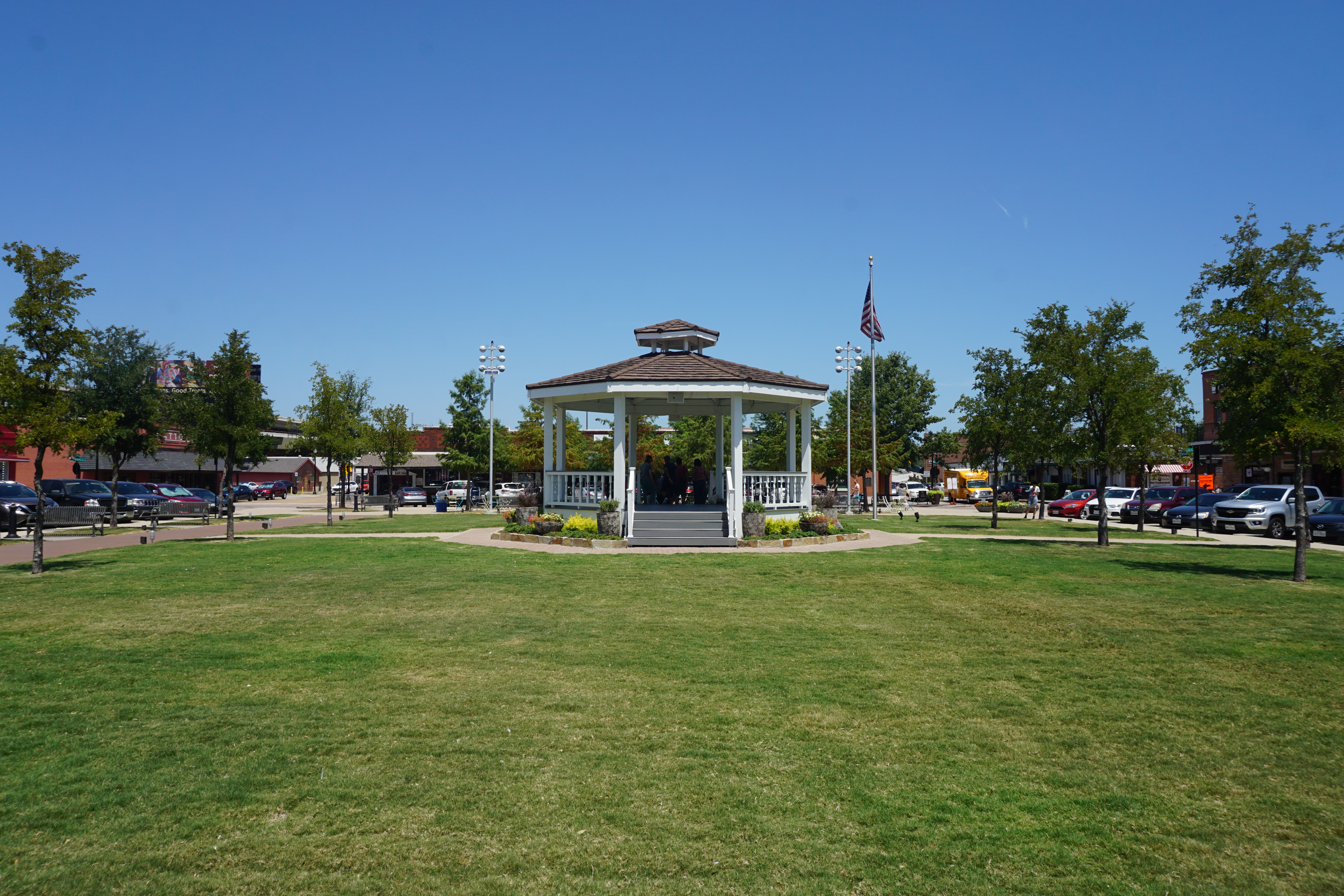
- Carrollton Square

- Flag Logo

- Location in Dallas County and Texas

- Location in Texas Location in the United States
- Coordinates: 32°57′13″N 96°53′25″W
- Country: United States
- State: Texas
- Counties: Dallas, Denton, and Collin
- Established: June, 1913

Government
  - Type: Council-Manager
  - Mayor: Steve Babick
  - City Council: Christopher Axberg (Place 1); Jason Carpenter (Place 2); Vacant (Place 3); Andrew Palacios (Place 4); Nancy Cline (Place 5); Daisy Palomo (Place 6); H.A. "Rusty" Pendleton (Place 7)
  - City Manager: Erin Rinehart

Area
  - Total: 37.43 sq mi (96.94 km^{2})
  - Land: 36.66 sq mi (94.94 km^{2})
  - Water: 0.77 sq mi (2.00 km^{2}) 2.19%
- Elevation: 482 ft (147 m)

Population (2020)
  - Total: 133,434
  - Estimate (2021): 133,251
  - Density: 3,640/sq mi (1,405/km^{2})
- Time zone: UTC−6 (Central)
  - Summer (DST): UTC−5 (Central)
- ZIP codes: 75006, 75007, 75010, 75011
- Area codes: 214, 469, 945, 972
- FIPS code: 48-13024
- GNIS feature ID: 2409992
- Website: http://www.cityofcarrollton.com

Carrollton is a city in Dallas, Denton, and Collin counties in the U.S. state of Texas. As of the 2020 census, its population was 133,434, making it the 27th-most populous city in Texas.

== History ==
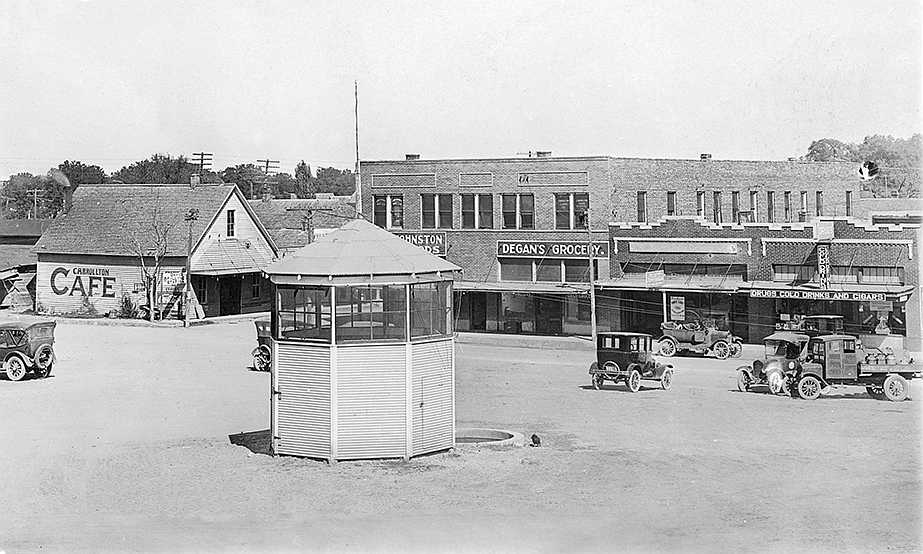
Carrollton (c. 1910–1930)

The area was first settled by Jared Ford in 1842 by William and Mary Larner on a site within the Peters Colony grant. In 1844, the A. W. Perry family claimed land in the area around Trinity Mills where, in partnership with Wade H. Witt, a mill was established.

The English colony, a group of families in the northeastern area of settlement which crossed into Denton County, was home to large landowners including the Furneaux, Jackson, Morgan, and Rowe families. Carrollton was most likely named after Carrollton, Illinois, the original home of many of these settlers, which itself was named after American Founding Father Charles Carroll, of Carrollton, MD..

Early on, Carrollton's livelihood was exclusively agricultural, but following the construction of the Dallas-Wichita Railroad through Trinity Mills in 1878, the community began to grow in its industrial significance. Carrollton's significance was further strengthened when the railroad was extended to Denton in 1880 by Jay Gould, who sold the line to the Missouri–Kansas–Texas Railroad (the Katy) in 1881. By 1885, Carrollton had flour mills, cotton gins, two churches, a school, and a population of 150. The St. Louis Southwestern Railway (the "Cotton Belt") crossed the Katy in 1888, and the town became a shipping center for livestock, cotton, cotton seed, and grain, helping the town surpass Trinity Mills to the north.

In 1913, Carrollton was officially incorporated, and W.F. Vinson was elected mayor. A gravel industry that began in Carrollton in 1912 transformed the city, by the late 1940s, to a "grain and gravel" town. The city also supported a brick plant and a dairy industry, and National Metal Products established itself in the city in 1946.

After World War II, the city grew rapidly. In 1950, its population stood at 1,610, and it grew to 4,242 in 1960 and 13,855 in 1970. At this point, significant suburban growth began spilling out of north Dallas, and the city grew tremendously between 1970 and 1980, with a documented growth of 193% to 40,595 inhabitants. By 1983, the population was 52,000, by 1990, it had reached 82,169, and by 2010 the population had grown to 119,097.

As a suburb of Dallas, in 2006, Carrollton was included in Relocate America's "Top 100 Places to Live" list. Also in 2006, it was selected as the 19th best place to live in the United States by Money magazine. In 2008, it was named by Money magazine the 15th best place to live among small cities.

== Geography ==
Carrollton, Texas

Climate chart (precipitation, max. and min. temperature)
J	F	M	A	M	J	J	A	S	O	N	D
1.9 55 36	2.3 61 41	3.1 69 49	3.5 77 56	5.3 84 65	3.9 92 73	2.4 96 77	2.2 96 76	2.7 89 69	4.7 79 58	2.6 66 47	2.5 57 39
- █ Average max. and min. temperatures in °F
- █ Precipitation totals in inches
- Source: Weather.com / NWS
Metric conversion
J	F	M	A	M	J	J	A	S	O	N	D
48 13 2	59 16 5	80 21 9	88 25 13	135 29 18	100 33 23	62 36 25	55 36 24	67 32 21	118 26 14	66 19 8	64 14 4
- █ Average max. and min. temperatures in °C
- █ Precipitation totals in mm

According to the United States Census Bureau, Carrollton has a total area of 37.1 square miles (96.1 km^{2}), of which 36.3 square miles (94.0 km^{2}) is land and 0.81 square miles (2.1 km^{2}), or 2.19%, is water. Carrollton is located in portions of three counties: Dallas, Denton, and Collin.

=== Climate ===
On average, the warmest month is July. The highest recorded temperature was 112 °F in 1980. The average coolest month is January. The lowest recorded temperature was 1 °F in 1989. The most precipitation on average occurs in May. Carrollton is considered to have a humid subtropical climate.

== Demographics ==
Historical population
Census	Pop.	Note	%±
1920	573		—
1930	689		20.2%
1940	921		33.7%
1950	1,610		74.8%
1960	4,242		163.5%
1970	13,855		226.6%
1980	40,595		193.0%
1990	82,169		102.4%
2000	109,576		33.4%
2010	119,097		8.7%
2020	133,434		12.0%
2023 (est.)	132,918		−0.4%
U.S. Decennial Census

In 1920, Carrollton had a population of 573; since then, its population has experienced positive growth as a suburb of the city of Dallas. In 2010, its population was 119,097, becoming the 23rd-most populous city in Texas. As of the 2020 census, it retained that ranking with 133,434 people.

=== Racial and ethnic composition ===
Carrollton city, Texas – Racial and ethnic composition Note: the US Census treats Hispanic/Latino as an ethnic category. This table excludes Latinos from the racial categories and assigns them to a separate category. Hispanics/Latinos may be of any race.
Race / Ethnicity (NH = Non-Hispanic)	Pop 2000	Pop 2010	Pop 2020	% 2000	% 2010	% 2020
White alone (NH)	67,078	55,083	49,929	61.22%	46.25%	37.42%
Black or African American alone (NH)	6,713	9,631	13,136	6.13%	8.09%	9.84%
Native American or Alaska Native alone (NH)	385	378	406	0.35%	0.32%	0.30%
Asian alone (NH)	11,903	15,917	22,367	10.86%	13.36%	16.76%
Native Hawaiian or Pacific Islander alone (NH)	56	32	88	0.05%	0.03%	0.07%
Other Race alone (NH)	159	207	530	0.15%	0.17%	0.40%
Mixed race or Multiracial (NH)	1,882	2,139	4,706	1.72%	1.80%	3.53%
Hispanic or Latino (any race)	21,400	35,710	42,272	19.53%	29.98%	31.68%
Total	109,576	119,097	133,434	100.00%	100.00%	100.00%

Like much of the continually diversifying United States, Carrollton was once a predominantly non-Hispanic white community. With continued immigration and birth rates among traditional minorities, Carrollton's population became more racially, ethnically, and culturally diverse; according to the 2010 census, the racial makeup of the city was 63.6% White, 8.4% Black or African American, 0.6% American Indian and Alaska Native, 13.4% Asian, 0.03% Native Hawaiian or other Pacific Islander, 10.8% some other race, and 3.1% from two or more races. Hispanic or Latino Americans of any race were 30.0% of the population. Since the 2020 census, non-Hispanic whites have made up 37.42% of the population, with Hispanic or Latino Americans increasing to 31.68% of the population. Black or African Americans were 9.84% of the population, and Asian Americans grew to 16.76% of the population. Pacific Islanders and people of other races made up a constituent minority of 0.07% and 0.40% each, respectively, and multiracial Americans increased to 3.53% of the population.

=== 2020 census ===
As of the 2020 census, Carrollton had a population of 133,434. The median age was 37.8 years. 21.5% of residents were under the age of 18 and 13.0% of residents were 65 years of age or older. For every 100 females there were 95.7 males, and for every 100 females age 18 and over there were 92.8 males age 18 and over. There were 50,301 households in Carrollton, of which 32.5% had children under the age of 18 living in them. Of all households, 50.7% were married-couple households, 17.0% were households with a male householder and no spouse or partner present, and 26.2% were households with a female householder and no spouse or partner present. About 24.0% of all households were made up of individuals and 7.0% had someone living alone who was 65 years of age or older. There were 53,080 housing units, of which 5.2% were vacant. Among occupied housing units, 58.1% were owner-occupied and 41.9% were renter-occupied. The homeowner vacancy rate was 0.8% and the rental vacancy rate was 8.7%. 100.0% of residents lived in urban areas, while 0% lived in rural areas.

Racial composition as of the 2020 census
Race	Percent
White	43.3%
Black or African American	10.1%
American Indian and Alaska Native	1.1%
Asian	16.9%
Native Hawaiian and Other Pacific Islander	0.1%
Some other race	12.3%
Two or more races	16.3%
Hispanic or Latino (of any race)	31.7%

By 2020, the American Community Survey 5-year estimates show that the median household income increased to $82,345; families had a median income of $95,235; married-couple families $105,361; and non-family households $58,811. An estimated 6.5% of the population lived at or below the poverty line from 2015 to 2020, and 77% of the population are employed by private companies.

=== 2010 census ===
At the 2010 census, the median income for a household in the city was $70,960 and the median income for a family was $68,672. The per capita income for the city was $26,746. About 4.1% of families and 5.6% of the population were below the poverty line, including 7.4% of those under age 18 and 6.3% of those age 65 or over.

== Economy ==
Top employers (2019)
#	Employer	# of Employees
1	Cencora	1500
2	Halliburton	1000
3	Thomson Reuters	1000
4	Western Extrusions	850
5	Securus Technologies	800
6	AER Manufacturing Inc.	750
7	Baylor Scott & White	640
8	Fairway Mortgage Company	550
9	G6 Hospitality	500
10	Hilton Reservations Worldwide	450

As a suburb of Dallas, the city of Carrollton has sustained its own economic identity with the growing metropolitan area within North Texas. Most notably, Carrollton has become the headquarters for FASTSIGNS International, Inc., Halliburton's Easywell in Carrollton, Heelys, Inc., Motel 6 (G6 Hospitality), SECURUS Technologies, and Woot Inc. (Subsidiary of Amazon).

Carrollton is home to the largest Korean community in Texas and the southern United States. Koreatown Carrollton, located at the intersection of Old Denton Road and President George Bush Turnpike, is home to a large number of Asian restaurants and businesses further stimulating the local and regional economies.

== Government ==
According to the city's 2018 Comprehensive Annual Financial Report, the city's various funds had $150,984,518 in revenue, $151,204,878 in expenditures, $529,903,760 in total assets, $265,901,182 in total liabilities, and $177,408,987 in cash and investments.

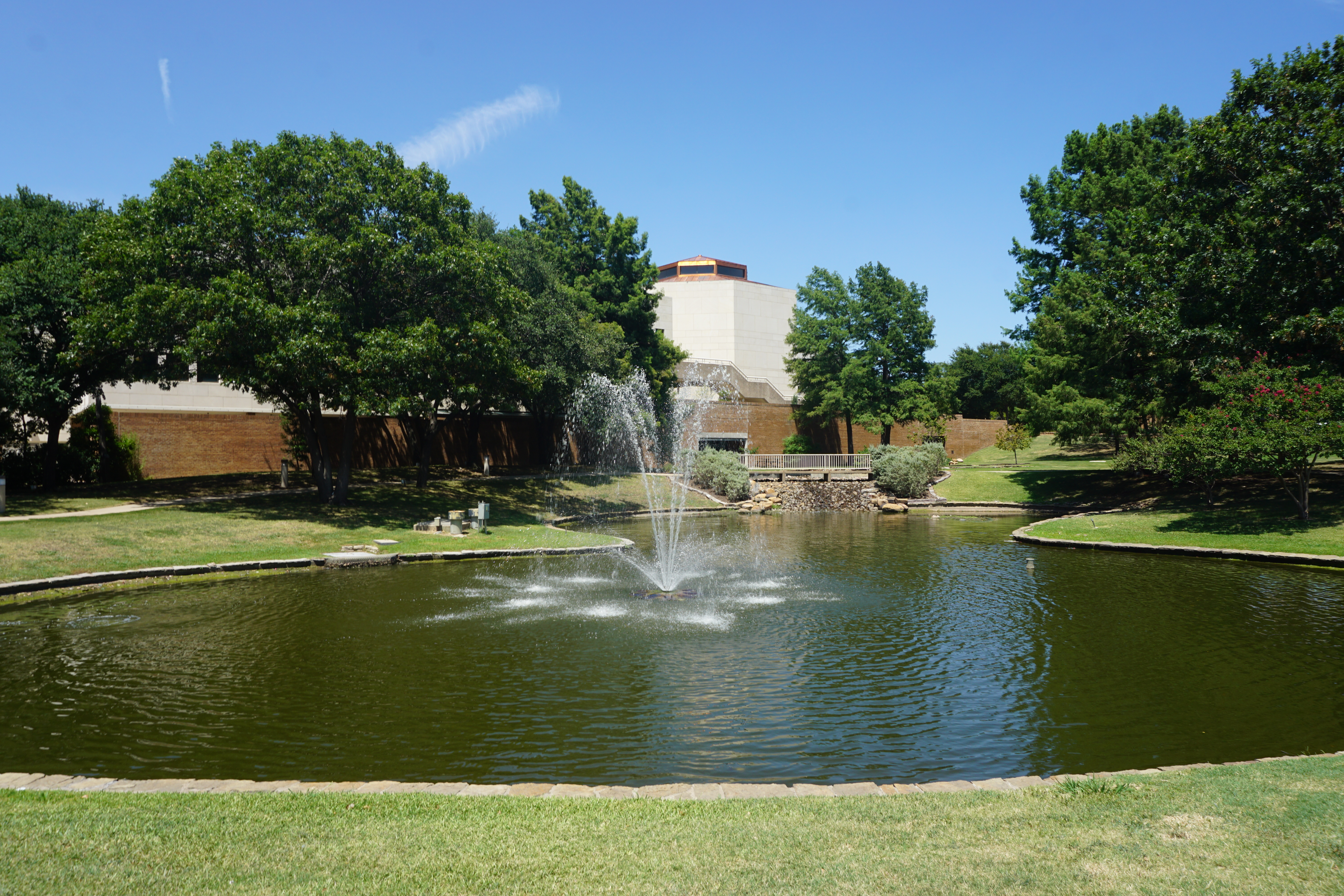
Carrollton City Hall

Carrollton is a voluntary member of the North Central Texas Council of Governments association, the purpose of which is to coordinate individual and collective local governments and facilitate regional solutions, eliminate unnecessary duplication, and enable joint decisions.

Carrollton has a city council that consists of seven members and a mayor. The mayor is Steve Babick, who previously served as a council member. The city council is responsible for establishing city policies, considering city resolutions and ordinances, appointing citizens to various city boards and commissions, adopting the city's Comprehensive Plan and annual budget, and approving or rejecting zoning changes; it meets on the first and third Tuesday of every month.

== Education ==
=== Primary and secondary schools ===
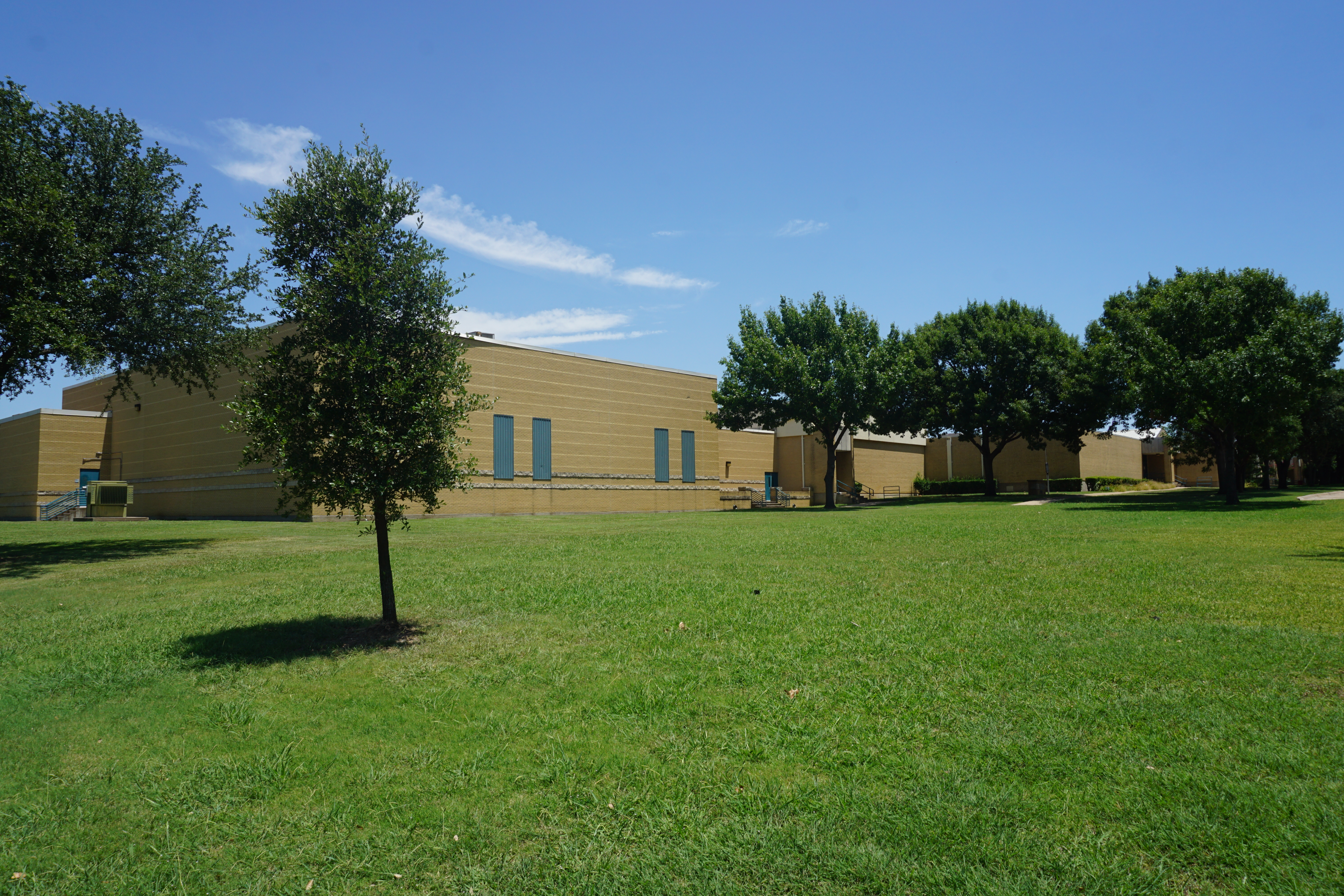
DeWitt Perry Middle School

Most of Carrollton is a part of the Carrollton-Farmers Branch Independent School District which is within Dallas and Denton counties. Dallas Independent School District also serves a small portion of Carrollton in the southeast and Coppell Independent School District covers a portion to the southwest, both in Dallas County. The Lewisville Independent School District covers the northern sections of the city.

The portion of Carrollton in Collin County is within the Plano Independent School District.

CFBISD operates three high schools in Carrollton: Newman Smith High School, R.L. Turner High School, and Creekview High School. Lewisville ISD operates Hebron High School.

The DISD portion is within the attendance boundaries of Jerry R. Junkins Elementary School in Carrollton, Ewell D. Walker Middle School in Dallas, and W. T. White High School in Dallas. Private schools in the area include The Saint Anthony School, Carrollton Christian Academy. At one time Coram Deo Academy had a campus in Carrollton.

There are three major charter schools in Carrollton. Carrollton Classical Academy, grades K–9, which holds classes at the recently purchased First Baptist Carrollton Josey Campus, Harmony School of Innovation, grades K–8, and Trivium Academy, grades K–8, which holds classes on the campus of First Methodist Carrollton. The 13,000-capacity Tommy Standridge Stadium is located in Carrollton; it is mostly used for high school football and soccer.

=== Colleges and universities ===
Areas in Dallas County and in CFBISD (which is partially in Denton County) are in the zone for Dallas College (formerly Dallas County Community College or DCCCD). Areas in Collin County are in the zone for Collin College. Areas in most of Denton County (including the Lewisville School District) are in the North Central Texas College district.

=== Public libraries ===
Carrollton Public Library has two locations: Hebron & Josey and Josey Ranch Lake.

=== Weekend education ===
The Japanese School of Dallas, a supplementary Japanese school, conducts its classes at Ted Polk Middle School in Carrollton. The school has its main offices in Farmers Branch.

== Transportation ==
Carrollton is connected to the Metroplex's highway network by Interstate 35E and the President George Bush Turnpike, as well as the Sam Rayburn Tollway at the far north end of the city.

Dallas/Fort Worth International Airport is five miles southwest of Carrollton, and Dallas Love Field is eight miles south.

The Green Line of Dallas Area Rapid Transit's DART rail system terminates at North Carrollton/Frankford Station and has additional stops within the city limits at Trinity Mills and Downtown Carrollton. Trinity Mills is also the southern terminus of Denton County's A-train, which provides service to Lewisville and Denton. Downtown Carrollton is also a stop on DART's Silver Line.

== Notable people ==
- Anthony Ampaipitakwong, soccer player
- Carson Blair, former catcher for the Oakland Athletics
- David Blough, quarterback for NFL's Minnesota Vikings, attended Creekview High School
- Amanda Bouldin, New Hampshire politician from Carrollton
- Ashley Cain, 2019 U.S. figure skating champion in the pairs discipline
- Bo Carter, member of College Sports Communicators Hall of Fame
- Rafael Cruz, father of U.S. Senator Ted Cruz
- Braeden Daniels, football player
- Laganja Estranja, drag performer, contestant on RuPaul's Drag Race
- Cherami Leigh, actress/voice actress
- Rhema Marvanne, child gospel singer featured in movie Machine Gun Preacher
- Jason Maxiell, forward for NBA's Detroit Pistons, attended Newman Smith High School
- Katie Meili, Olympic swimmer who won gold and bronze medals at the 2016 Summer Olympics.
- Keith Moreland, professional baseball player and broadcaster; attended R.L. Turner High School
- Noah Ringer, Taekwondo champion and The Last Airbender actor
- Ryan Russell, professional football player
- Melissa Rycroft, former Dallas Cowboys cheerleader and Dancing with the Stars and The Bachelor contestant
- Taylor Teagarden, catcher for MLB's Baltimore Orioles, attended Creekview High School
- Vanilla Ice (Robert Van Winkle), rapper and reality TV star; attended R.L. Turner High School
- Deron Williams, point guard for NBA's Cleveland Cavaliers, attended Arbor Creek Middle School
- Travis Wilson, wide receiver for NFL's Cleveland Browns, attended Creekview High School

== Sister cities ==
- Guri City, Republic of Korea
