= Early College High School (Farmers Branch, Texas) =

Public school in Texas, United States

Coordinates: 32.9302°N 96.8506°W

- Farmers Branch, Texas; United States

Information
- Established: 2006; 20 years ago
- Principal: Timothy A. Isaly

Early College High School (ECHS) is an early college senior high school on the grounds of Brookhaven College, in Farmers Branch, Texas, in the Dallas-Fort Worth Metroplex. As of 2024 Timothy A. Isaly is the principal.

ECHS, the fifth CFBISD high school, opened in 2006. It takes in about 75-100 9th grade students on an annual basis.

In 2014 and 2020 it was named a National Blue Ribbon School.
