= Carrollton-Farmers Branch Independent School District =

School district in Texas, United States

Coordinates: 32°57′24.5″N 96°53′46.5″W

Location
- ESC Region 10 United States

District information
- Type: Independent School District
- Motto: High Expectations for All
- Grades: Pre-K-12th
- Superintendent: Dr. Wendy Eldredge

Students and staff
- Students: 26,000
- Staff: 3,500

Other information
- Website: http://www.cfbisd.edu

Carrollton-Farmers Branch Independent School District (CFBISD) is a school district based in Carrollton, Texas, United States.

The district covers most of the cities of Carrollton and Farmers Branch and parts of Addison, Coppell, Dallas, and Irving (including Valley Ranch and the Western part of Las Colinas). CFBISD has twenty-one active elementary schools, five active middle schools, five active high schools, and three active education centers.

Recently, the school district began the process of Limited Open Enrollment, allowing students living outside the boundaries of the school district to apply to attend the district. Furthermore, they have provided buses for easily, accessible, transportation.

In 2010 and 2011, the school district was rated "recognized" by the Texas Education Agency.

== About Carrollton-Farmers Branch Independent School District ==
The district encompasses 53.42 square miles (138.4 km^{2}) and is located primarily in Dallas County with a smaller portion in Denton County. The school district's boundaries are not the same as municipal boundaries; therefore, Carrollton-Farmers Branch Independent School District provides instructional services to children who live in portions of Carrollton, Farmers Branch, Addison, Coppell, Dallas, and Irving.

Dr. Wendy Eldredge is the current Superintendent taking over after the retirement of Dr. John Chapman last year.

== History ==
Farmers Branch Independent School District consolidated with the Carrollton ISD in 1954. Prior to that, the two cities operated separate school systems, although only Carrollton's went through the twelfth grade; Farmers Branch students had to decide in eighth grade if they wanted to attend high school in Carrollton or at Hillcrest High School in Dallas.

The merger coincided with the beginning of 30 years of rapid growth for the two cities. At the time of the merger there were three schools operating: Carrollton Elementary (opened in 1951), Carrollton High School (opened in 1936 and now DeWitt Perry Middle School) and the original Farmers Branch School (opened in 1904) on Valley View Road. In the next decade the district built four new elementary schools – Valwood in 1955, R.E. Good in 1956, Webb Chapel in 1959, and Stark in 1964. The first dedicated junior high school, Vivian Field, opened in Farmers Branch in 1960.

In 1962, the R.L. Turner High School campus was opened on Josey Lane, on the border between Carrollton and Farmers Branch. At that point Carrollton High School was renamed for DeWitt Perry and became the district's second junior high campus.

School construction continued apace for another ten years – Central Elementary in 1965, Farmers Branch Elementary in 1967, Blanton Elementary in 1971, and Woodlake (now June R. Thompson) Elementary in 1974. In 1975 two more elementary schools, Country Place and Dale B. Davis, were opened. The first phase of Newman Smith High School – the district's second high school campus – was finished in 1975 as well. The campus served grades 8–12 until North Carrollton Junior High School (now Dan F. Long Middle School) opened in 1979.

With the southern half of the district now built out, growth shifted northward in the late 1970s and 1980s, with McCoy Elementary (1978), Furneaux Elementary (1980), Rosemeade Elementary (1983), Sheffield Elementary (changed to Sheffield Primary in 1989) along with Blalack Junior High (1985) and Sheffield Intermediate (1989) opened to handle the increased enrollment. In 1986 the first school west of Interstate 35E, Las Colinas Elementary, was opened. Kent Elementary (1989), McKamy Elementary (1993) and Rainwater Elementary (1994) were also opened. After years of searching for a suitable site, the third high school, Creekview, was opened in 1998.

In the 1990s the district decided to switch to a "middle school" concept, moving sixth graders from elementary schools to the former junior high campuses. All four existing middle schools were expanded and Ted Polk (1997) and Barbara Bush (1998) middle schools were added. Much of the latest growth has occurred on the district's west side, with Tom Landry Elementary (1996), Riverchase Elementary (2000), Ranchview High School (2002), Freeman Elementary (2004), Kelly Pre-K Center (2007) and La Villita Elementary (2008) being constructed. Rapid growth in older areas necessitated the addition of McWhorter Elementary (2001), Dave Blair Intermediate (2002) and Nancy Strickland Intermediate (2008).

== Information ==
Number of campuses:

- Elementary Schools (Pre-K to 5): 21
- Middle Schools (6–8): 5
- High Schools (9–12): 5
- Special Programs Centers (K-8/9-12): 3
- Total Campuses: 34

== Demographics ==
Carrollton-Farmers Branch ISD Ethnicity Data 2018–2019
Ethnicity	Percent
White	12.7%
Asian	11.8%
Hispanic	55.5%
African American	16.7%
American Indian	0.3%
Pacific Islander	0.1%
Two or More Races	2.8%

In 1997, over 50% of the students were non-Hispanic white. From that year to 2016 the number of non-Hispanic white students had declined by 65%.

From 1997 to 2016 the number of students on free or reduced lunches, a way of classifying a student as low income, increased by 175%.

== Student body ==
Enrollment: (as of September 2011)

- Elementary School (pre-kindergarten to 5): 13,282
- Middle School (6–8): 5,454
- High School (9–12): 7,634
- Total Enrollment: 26,370

In 2001 CFBISD had 25,000 students. Of them, 1,000 resided in the City of Irving.

In 2018, CFBISD had just less than 26,000 students.

== Schools ==
=== Secondary schools ===
==== High schools ====
Grades 9-12

- Creekview High School (Carrollton)
- Newman Smith High School (Carrollton)
- R. L. Turner High School (Carrollton)
- Ranchview High School (Irving)

Other

- Early College High School (9–12) (Farmers Branch)
- Bea Salazar Alternative School (KG-12)

==== Middle schools ====
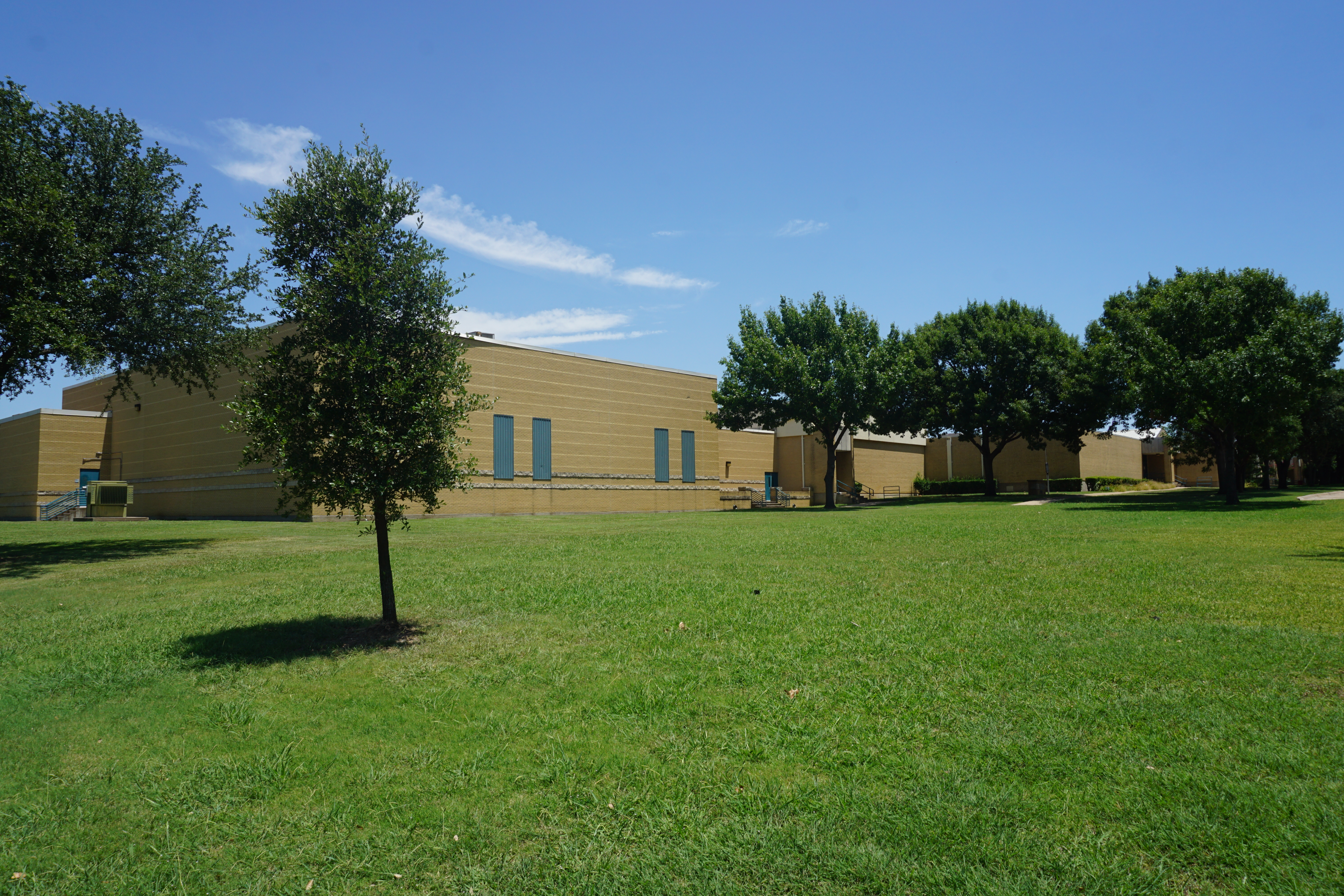
DeWitt Perry Middle School

Grades 6–8

- Charles M. Blalack Middle School (Carrollton)
  - The school colors are maroon, black, and white, and the mascot is Chuck D. Bear. The school opened in 1986. The school was a 1992–93 National Blue Ribbon School.
- Barbara Bush Middle School (Irving)
  - The school opened in 1998, named after former first lady "Barbara Bush". The school colors are red, black, and white, and the mascot is the Bronco. It was the first middle school to be built in parts of Irving, Texas. The school recently had its rebrand in July 2026, updating the school even more.
- Vivian Field Middle School (Farmers Branch)
  - The school colors are blue and grey, and the mascot is a Viking. The school opened as a junior high school in 1959. In the early 1990s the school was expanded and the sixth grade was added. Another expansion and modernization in 2001-2002 added a new classroom wing and main entrance, and substantially modernized the existing building. Field serves portions of Farmers Branch and the CFBISD portion of Addison. Field was named a 1992-93 National Blue Ribbon School.
- Dan F. Long Middle School (Dallas)
  - The mascot is a falcon, for its fierce attitude. The school colors are a dark navy blue and gold. The school's karate demonstration team (Demo Team) won the Martial Arts Extravaganza for the second time in 4 years (2009, 2012). However CFBISD has closed the school, as of 2025.
- DeWitt Perry Middle School (Carrollton)
  - The school colors are red and white and the mascot is an eagle. It is home to the secondary portion of CFBISD's LEAP program (Leading Exceptional Academic Producers).
  - The school was originally known as Carrollton High School, opening in September 1936 on land donated by DeWitt Clinton Perry and his sister Harriet Perry Warner. The DeWitt Perry name became officially recognized in 1962 when the school became a junior high school after R.L. Turner High School opened. The school was substantially expanded and modernized in 1995-1996.
  - The band has gone all the way to State level two years in a row, becoming the first in the district.
- Ted Polk Middle School (Carrollton)
  - The school colors are blue and green and the mascot is a panther. Opening in 1997, Ted Polk Middle School is named after former CFBISD employee Ted Polk. Before he died, he was the director of Fine Arts in CFBISD for many years, and was also a choir director at R.L. Turner. During the year of 2007, the Wind Symphony band was invited to Austin to play for Governor Rick Perry.

==== Elementary schools ====
Grades K-5

- Blair Elementary School (Farmers Branch)
- L.F. Blanton Elementary School (Carrollton)
- Carrollton Elementary School (Carrollton)
- Central Elementary School (Carrollton)
  - Was decommissioned along with Dan F. Long Middle School
- Country Place Elementary School (Carrollton)
- Dale B. Davis Elementary School (Carrollton)
- Farmers Branch Elementary School (Farmers Branch)
- Bernice Chatman Freeman Elementary School (Irving)
- Furneaux Elementary School (Carrollton)
  - Closed in 2025, along with the other 3 schools
- R.E. Good Elementary School (Carrollton)
  - Along with the shutting down of the former LEAP program home, Mccoy Elementary, the program was moved to Good Elementary School
- E.L. Kent Elementary School (Carrollton)
  - 1993–94 National Blue Ribbon School
- Tom Landry Elementary School (Irving)
- Las Colinas Elementary School (Irving)
  - 1993–94 Blue Ribbon Schools Program
- La Villita Elementary School (Irving)
- McCoy Elementary School (Carrollton)
  - 1998–99 Blue Ribbon Schools Program
  - The home of the elementary LEAP program, until 2025, when it was shut down with the other 3 schools in the district
- Charlie C. McKamy Elementary School (Dallas)
- McLaughlin Strickland Elementary (Farmers Branch)
- Kathryn S. McWhorter Elementary School (Dallas)
- Annie Heads Rainwater Elementary School (Carrollton)
- Riverchase Elementary School (Coppell)
- Rosemeade Elementary School (Carrollton)
- Donald H. Sheffield Elementary (Dallas)
- Janie Stark Elementary School (Farmers Branch)
- June Rhoton Thompson Elementary School (Carrollton)
