= R. L. Turner High School =

Location
- 1600 South Josey Lane; Carrollton, Dallas County, Texas, 75006; United States; 32.94828°N 96.8916°W

Information
- School type: Public, Secondary
- Motto: Character Counts!
- Opened: 1903
- School district: Carrollton-Farmers Branch Independent School District
- Principal: Ivan Cedillo
- Staff: 143.90 (FTE)
- Grades: 9th through 12th
- Enrollment: 2,010 (2023-2024)
- Student to teacher ratio: 13.97
- Colors: White, black and blue
- Mascot: Lion
- Website: turner.cfbisd.edu

R. L. Turner High School is a public high school located in Carrollton, Texas, (USA) in the Carrollton-Farmers Branch Independent School District. The school serves portions of Carrollton, Farmers Branch, and Addison.

In 2015, the school was rated "Met Standard" by the Texas Education Agency.

== Athletics ==
The Turner Lions compete in the following sports:

- Baseball
- Basketball
- Cross Country
- Football
- Golf
- Powerlifting
- Soccer
- Softball
- Swimming and Diving
- Tennis
- Track and Field
- Volleyball
- Wrestling
- Drill Team

=== Soccer ===
The Turner soccer team won the District 18-AAAA Championship in 2009 and 2011.

== Notable alumni ==
- Charley Crockett, country musician
- George Dunham, radio personality
- Abraham George, Chairman Republican Party of Texas
- Henry Godinez, Noted Latino theater director and writer
- Bridget Hall, Top Model
- Bob Jackson, former professional football player
- Andrew Magee, PGA Tour member, has 4 tournament wins and is the only one on the PGA to have a hole-in-one on a par four
- Kenny Marchant, Representative for Texas's 24th congressional district
- Bill Montgomery, All District Quarterback and All-Southwest Conference quarterback at the University of Arkansas from 1968-1970
- Keith Moreland, famed Major League Baseball standout and University of Texas broadcaster (All-America in baseball and played football at UT), a former analyst on Chicago Cubs Radio Network.
- Judy Trammell, head choreographer for the Dallas Cowboys Cheerleaders
- Vanilla Ice, rapper famous for his hit song "Ice Ice Baby".
