= Farmers Branch, Texas =

- City
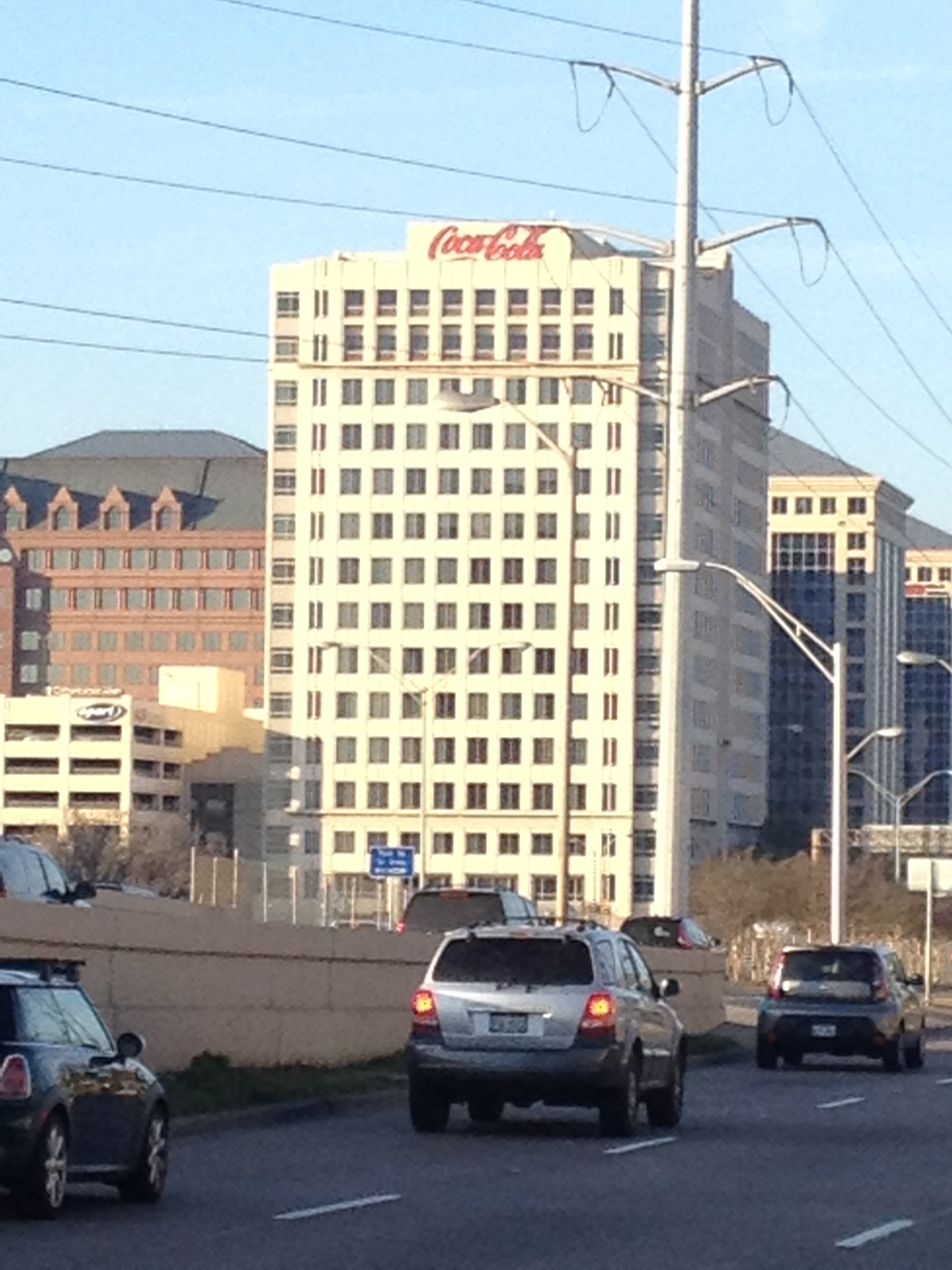
- Coca-Cola Enterprises offices in Farmers Branch

- Flag
- Nickname: The City in a Park
- Location in Dallas County and the state of Texas
- Coordinates: 32°55′38″N 96°51′50″W
- Country: United States
- State: Texas
- County: Dallas
- First Settled: Early 1850s
- Incorporated: February 23, 1946

Government
  - Type: Council-Manager
  - City Council: Mayor Terry Lynne; District 1 Lupe Gonzalez; District 2 Tina Bennett-Burton; District 3 David Reid; District 4 Elizabeth Villafranca; District 5 Roger Neal
  - City Manager: Ben Williamson

Area
  - City: 12.04 sq mi (31.18 km^{2})
  - Land: 11.88 sq mi (30.77 km^{2})
  - Water: 0.16 sq mi (0.41 km^{2}) 0.8%
- Elevation: 509 ft (155 m)

Population (2020)
  - City: 35,991
  - Estimate (2021): 36,442
  - Density: 4,053.4/sq mi (1,565.02/km^{2})
  - Urban: 5,121,892* (6th)
  - Metro: 7,539,711* (4th)
  - CSA: 7,957,493* (7th)
- Farmers Branch as part of the Urban, Metro (MSA) & Combined Statistical Areas (CSA)
- Time zone: UTC-6 (Central)
  - Summer (DST): UTC-5 (Central)
- ZIP code: 75234, 75244
- Area code: 214, 469, 945, 972
- FIPS code: 48-25452
- GNIS feature ID: 2410484
- Website: farmersbranchtx.gov

Farmers Branch, officially the City of Farmers Branch, is a city in Dallas County, Texas, United States. It is an inner-ring suburb of Dallas and is part of the Dallas–Fort Worth metroplex. Its population was 35,991 at the 2020 census.

== History ==
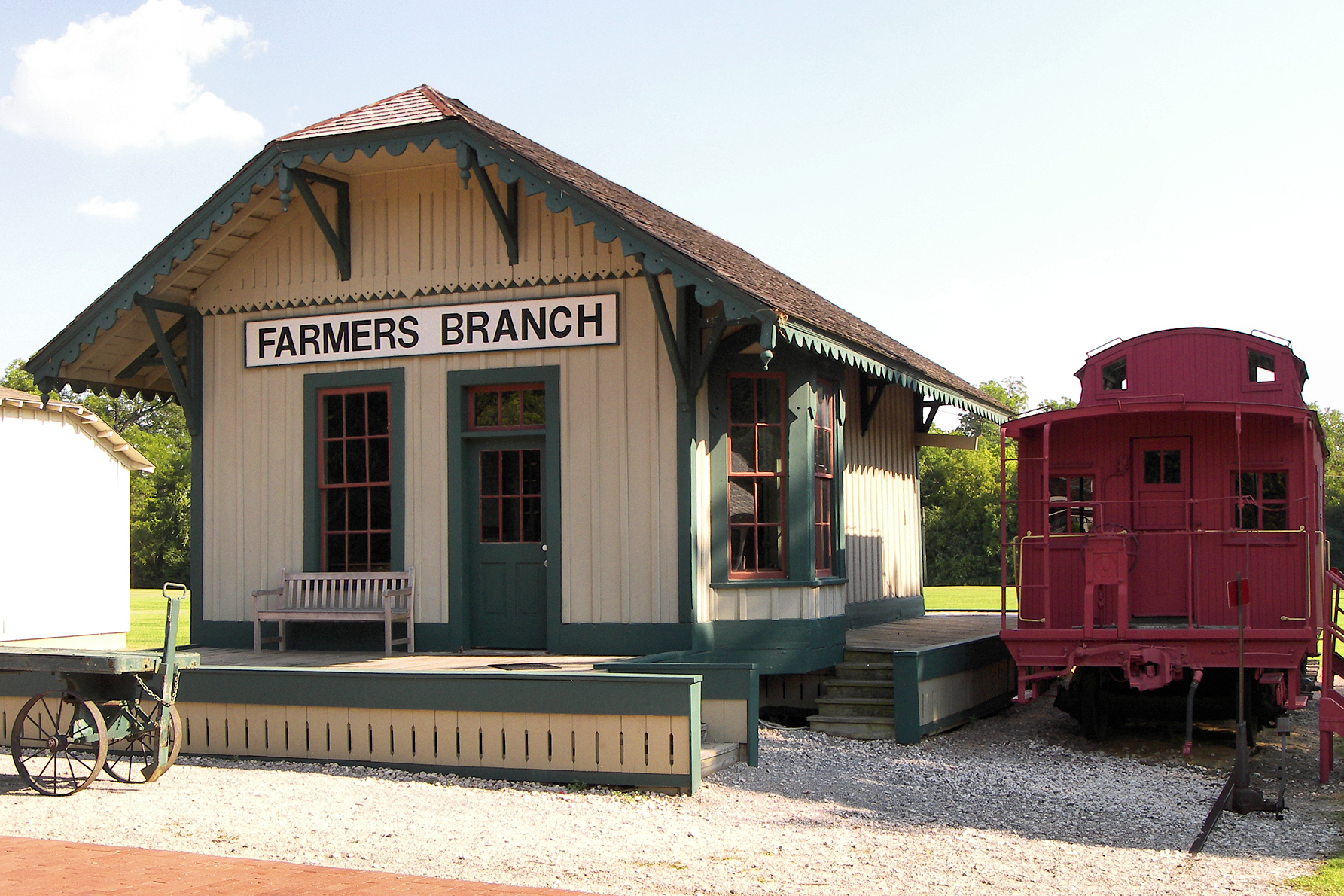
Historic railroad depot, built 1877

In 1842, Thomas Keenan, Isaac B. Webb, and William Cochran received original land grants in the area. By 1843, a community called Mustang Branch had been established. Mr. Cochran later changed the name to Farmers Branch to reflect the area's rich soil and farmland. Farmers Branch was the first location of the Texan Land and Emigration Company (or Peters Colony) in 1845. This made the community one of the best-known places in Dallas County during the 1840s because of its advertising throughout Europe and the United States. Baptist minister William Bowles opened a blacksmith shop and gristmill in 1845. On May 5, 1845, Isaac B. Webb donated land for Webb's Chapel Methodist Church, the first formal place of worship in Dallas County. A school was established in the church one year later. Webb became the first postmaster at the Farmers Branch post office, which opened on January 5, 1848. It continued to function until its closure in 1866. The post office reopened in 1875.

The community was first thoroughly settled in the early 1850s. The murder of widower Andrew C. Wisdom by enslaved woman Jane Elkins occurred in Farmers Branch in 1852.

To assure that railroads would eventually pass through Farmers Branch, prominent early settler Samuel Gilbert and others sold right-of-way through their land in 1874. Around three to four years later, the Dallas and Wichita Railway completed a track from Dallas—through Farmers Branch—to Lewisville. It was absorbed by the Missouri–Kansas–Texas Railroad in 1881. The community had a population around 100 by 1890, with several businesses. The population had grown to 300 during the early 1900s. A brick school building was constructed in 1916. The number of people living in the community remained stable until after World War II.

Farmers Branch was incorporated as a city after an election was held on February 23, 1946. William F. (Bill) Dodson was elected as the city's first mayor. The implementation of city services began immediately after incorporation. In the 1950 census, Farmers Branch had a population of 915. In 1956, a home-rule charter was approved that adopted a council-manager form of government. The rapid growth of the city during the 1950s was made apparent in the 1960 census, which recorded a total of 13,441 residents, a 1,369% increase over the 1950 figure. Most of the new residents commuted to nearby Dallas for employment. The population topped 27,000 by 1970. A variety of manufacturers producing items such as steel products, concrete, asphalt, cosmetics, and food products was operating in the city. The number of residents declined to 24,863 in 1980 and 24,250 in 1990. The falling population was offset, however, by the wide variety of businesses located in the city. Farmers Branch is home to a large number of corporations that have attained frontage along Interstate 635, the Dallas North Tollway, and Interstate 35E. Its Dallas North Tollway segment is part of the Platinum Corridor, and its land along Interstate 635 is an extension of the lengthy Irving Prairie office park. By 2000, the city's population had grown to 27,508. and by 2020 the city's population had grown to 35,991.

== Geography ==
According to the United States Census Bureau, the city has a total area of 11.79 sq mi (30.54 km^{2}) with only 0.08% (0.09 sq mi - 0.24 km2) covered by water.

== Demographics ==
Historical population
Census	Pop.	Note	%±
1950	915		—
1960	13,441		1,369.0%
1970	27,492		104.5%
1980	24,863		−9.6%
1990	24,250		−2.5%
2000	27,508		13.4%
2010	28,616		4.0%
2020	35,991		25.8%
U.S. Decennial Census

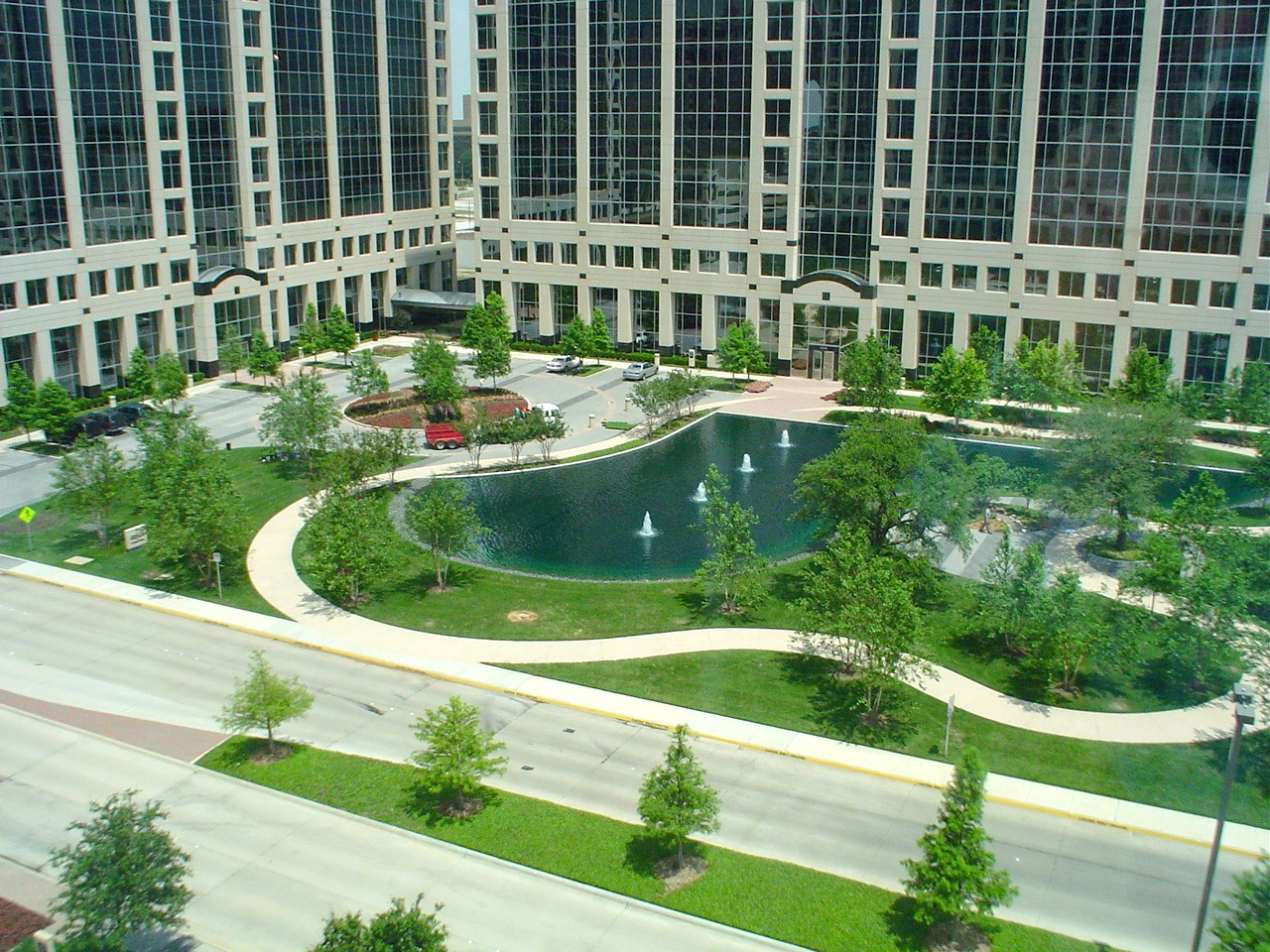
JP Morgan Chase Bank in Farmers Branch

=== 2020 census ===
As of the 2020 census, there were 35,991 people, 16,015 households, and 10,119 families residing in the city. The median age was 34.7 years, 18.8% of residents were under the age of 18, and 12.4% of residents were 65 years of age or older. For every 100 females there were 98.2 males, and for every 100 females age 18 and over there were 96.6 males age 18 and over.

As of the 2020 census, 100.0% of residents lived in urban areas, while 0.0% lived in rural areas.

As of the 2020 census, there were 14,932 households in Farmers Branch, of which 26.2% had children under the age of 18 living in them. Of all households, 41.5% were married-couple households, 21.9% were households with a male householder and no spouse or partner present, and 29.1% were households with a female householder and no spouse or partner present. About 32.5% of all households were made up of individuals and 7.5% had someone living alone who was 65 years of age or older.

As of the 2020 census, there were 17,100 housing units, of which 12.7% were vacant. The homeowner vacancy rate was 1.7% and the rental vacancy rate was 17.5%.

Farmers Branch racial composition as of 2020 (NH = Non-Hispanic) (Note: Note: the US Census treats Hispanic/Latino as an ethnic category. This table excludes Latinos from the racial categories and assigns them to a separate category. Hispanics/Latinos can be of any race.)
Race	Number	Percentage
White (NH)	12,957	36.0%
Black or African American (NH)	2,925	8.13%
Native American or Alaska Native (NH)	104	0.29%
Asian (NH)	3,132	8.7%
Pacific Islander (NH)	11	0.03%
Some Other Race (NH)	180	0.5%
Mixed/Multi-Racial (NH)	1,008	2.8%
Hispanic or Latino	15,674	43.55%
Total	35,991	

== Economy ==
According to the city's 2025 Annual Comprehensive Financial Report the top employers in the city are:

#	Employer	# of Employees
1	TDIndustries	1,500
1	Internal Revenue Service	1,200
2	Feizy	1,170
3	Anserteam LLC	1,001
4	Trinity Industries	1,000
5	Southwestern Health Resources	900
7	o9 Solutions	830
8	Southern Glazer's Wine and Spirits	650
9	Interstate Batteries	520
10	Lidon Security Associates	500

As of 2012, Farmers Branch had 3,500 companies. Celanese Corporation, Eyemart Express, I2 Technologies, OxyChem, and Varsity Brands have their headquarters in Farmers Branch. Maxim Integrated Products has an office in Farmers Branch. All Smiles Dental Centers formerly had its headquarters in Farmers Branch. Excellence Health Inc. has an office in Farmers Branch that covers the Dallas life sciences cluster.

North Central Texas Council of Governments 2018 estimated total employment for the City of Farmers Branch is 78,393. The report is adjusted by the City of Farmers Branch finance department for businesses closed or moved prior to the reporting year.

== Government ==
=== Politics ===
Farmers Branch city vote by party in presidential elections
Year	Democratic	Republican	Third Parties
2024	55.42% 8,319	42.41% 6,366	2.17% 326
2020	58.42% 8,588	39.80% 5,851	1.78% 261
2016	49.56% 5,364	45.52% 4,927	4.92% 533
2012	41.14% 3,838	57.13% 5,329	1.73% 161

=== Local government ===
According to the city's most recent Comprehensive Annual Financial Report Fund Financial Statements, the city's various funds had $50.0 million in revenues, $64.5 million in expenditures, $33.8 million in total assets, $6.5 million in total liabilities, and $38.2 million in investments.

The structure of the management and co-ordination of city services is:

Department	Director
City Manager	Ben Williamson
Deputy City Manager	Jawaria Tareen
Assistant to the City Manager	Vacant
City Secretary	Stacy Henderson
Municipal Judge	Terry L. Carnes
Communications	Vacant
Community Services	Vacant
Neighborhood Services	Vacant
Planning & Zoning	Vacant
Economic Development & Tourism	Vacant
Finance	Jay Patel
Human Resources	Jeffrey Ross
Innovation & Technology	Joseph Brock
Manske Library	Vacant
Fire Chief	Daniel Latimer
Police Chief	Kevin McCoy
Parks & Recreation	Robert Diaz
Public Works	Vacant
Fleet & Facilities Management	Vacant

The city has its own police department.

Farmers Branch is a voluntary member of the North Central Texas Council of Governments association, the purpose of which is to co-ordinate individual and collective local governments and facilitate regional solutions, eliminate unnecessary duplication, and enable joint decisions.

=== Education ===
==== Public school districts ====
Residential areas in Farmers Branch are within two school districts.

Most of Farmers Branch is a part of the Carrollton-Farmers Branch Independent School District. Dave Blair Elementary School, Farmers Branch Elementary School, Janie Stark Elementary School, and Nancy H. Strickland Intermediate School (3–5) are in Farmers Branch. Sections zoned to Strickland for grades 3–5 are zoned to Neil Ray McLaughlin Elementary School (K–2) in Carrollton Vivian C. Field Middle School is in Farmers Branch and serves almost all of the CFBISD portion. R. L. Turner High School in Carrollton also serves almost all of CFBISD Farmers Branch. Residential areas south of Interstate 635 and west of Interstate 35E are zoned to La Villita Elementary School, Barbara Bush Middle School and Ranchview High School in Irving. CFBISD's Early College High School, an alternative high school, is on the property of Brookhaven College.

Dallas Independent School District includes a small portion of Farmers Branch. One DISD elementary school, Chapel Hill Preparatory School, known as William L. Cabell Elementary School until its 2018 renaming, is in Farmers Branch. Its current name is a reference to the Chapel Hill community; it was renamed since the former namesake, Mayor of Dallas William Lewis Cabell, served in the Confederate States of America. Other residential portions of DISD Farmers Branch are served by Gooch Elementary. Residential areas in DISD are zoned to Marsh Middle School and W.T. White High School.

Mayor Tim O'Hare proposed making a new municipal Farmers Branch school district with the portions currently in CFBISD and DISD. In 2011, about 66% of voters decided against the referendum. At the time, the city did not have the 8,000 children required under Texas law as a requirement for forming a new district, so KTVT stated, "Even if the proposal had passed, there would have been little, if anything, the city could have done to move forward".

==== Private schools ====
Mary Immaculate Catholic School, a part of the Roman Catholic Diocese of Dallas, is in Farmers Branch. In addition, German International School of Dallas, established in 2009 and serving preschool and elementary school, is in the city limits.

==== Colleges and universities ====
The Texas Legislature defines all of Dallas County (Farmers Branch included) as in the service area of Dallas College, as well as all of CFBISD. Brookhaven College of Dallas College is in the Farmers Branch city limits.

Additionally Farmers Branch is home to Dallas Christian College, a four-year Bible college.

==== Weekend supplementary education ====
The Japanese School of Dallas, a supplementary Japanese school, previously had its main office in Farmers Branch. The school conducts its classes at Ted Polk Middle School in Carrollton. On Monday July 25, 2016 the Japanese Association and the Japanese School offices moved to a new location in Dallas. The classroom location remained the same.

== Transportation ==
Farmers Branch was one of 15 cities to approve services of Dallas Area Rapid Transit in 1983 by levying a 1 cent sales tax. The city currently receives DART bus service, with service to downtown Dallas (by both regular route and express bus), the adjacent suburb of Carrollton, and crosstown routes as well. On December 6, 2010, the city received light rail transit service with a station near the northeast corner of Interstates 635 and 35E on the Green Line, which runs from Pleasant Grove in southeast Dallas through downtown Dallas following I-35E up to Carrollton at Frankford Road.

The city is between Interstate 35E to the west, the Dallas North Tollway on the east, and Interstate 635 to the south.

== Sister cities ==
Farmers Branch maintains a sister city relationship with Bassetlaw, United Kingdom, and Garbsen, Germany.

== Notable people ==
- Julie Johnson – U.S. representative, former Texas state representative
- Tim O'Hare – former mayor of Farmers Branch
- Boomer Castleman – singer-songwriter and guitarist
- Evan Gattis – baseball player
