= Dallas College Brookhaven =

Community college in Farmers Branch, Texas, U.S.

Coordinates: 32°55′45.43″N 96°51′00.18″W

Dallas College Brookhaven Campus
- Motto: Dedicated to student success.
- Type: Public community College
- Established: 1978
- Parent institution: Dallas College
- Affiliations: Dallas College
- Chancellor: Justin D. Lonon
- President: Linda Braddy
- Faculty: 135 full-time, 400 part-time
- Students: 11,000 (spring 2014)
- Location: Farmers Branch, Texas, United States
- Campus: Suburban, 192 acres (0.8 km^{2})
- Colors: Light Green and Forest Green
- Sporting affiliations: NJCAA Division III
- Mascot: Bears
- Website: www.dallascollege.edu

Dallas College Brookhaven Campus (Brookhaven or BHC) is a public community college in Farmers Branch, Texas. It is one of seven campuses of Dallas College, and it opened in 1978, making it the newest campus in Dallas College (excluding satellite campuses).

== Campus ==
Dallas College Brookhaven Campus 192-acre (0.78 km^{2}) currently has a total of 467,000 square feet (43,400 m^{2}) of building space divided among 18 buildings. These buildings include the 20,000-square-foot (2,000 m^{2}) Brookhaven College Geotechnology Institute, one of three similar facilities nationwide to offer continuing professional development to professionals in the oil and gas industries, and the Brookhaven College School of the Arts (BCSA) expanded facility, with a 2,400-square-foot (220 m^{2}) gallery, a renovated ceramics/kiln yard, Macintosh computer lab and a 680-seat performance hall.

The Dallas Weekend College (DWEC) of Our Lady of the Lake University moved to Brookhaven in 1997.

== Notable alumni ==
- Derek Campos – mixed martial artist
- Brian Mushana Kwesiga - entrepreneur, engineer, and civic leader; former president and CEO, Ugandan North American Association (UNAA)
- Takudzwa Ngwenya – professional rugby player
- Jad Saxton – voice actress
