= List of colleges and universities in Texas =

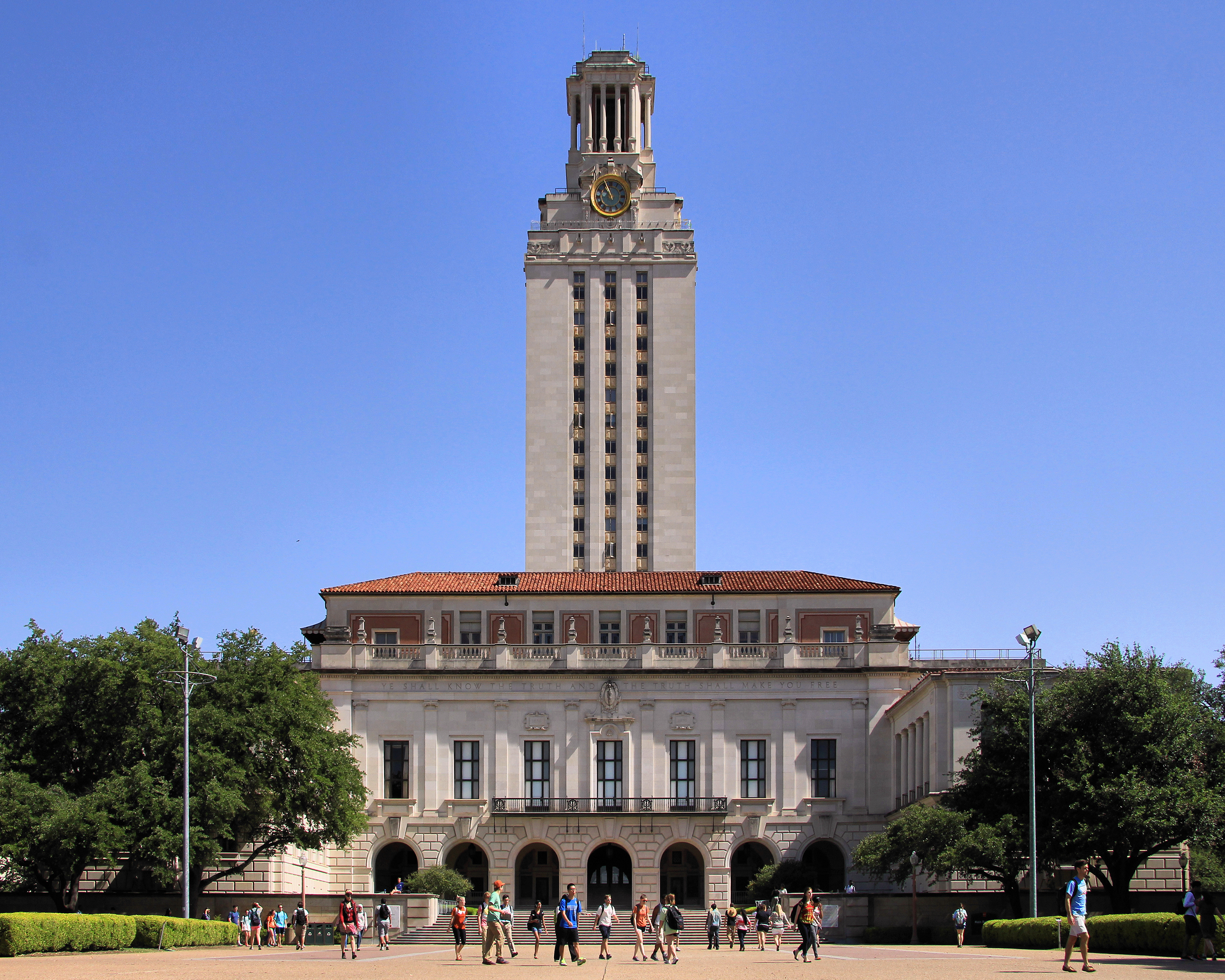
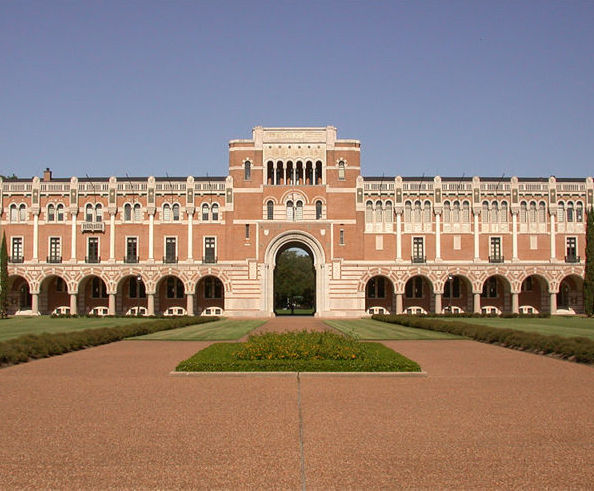
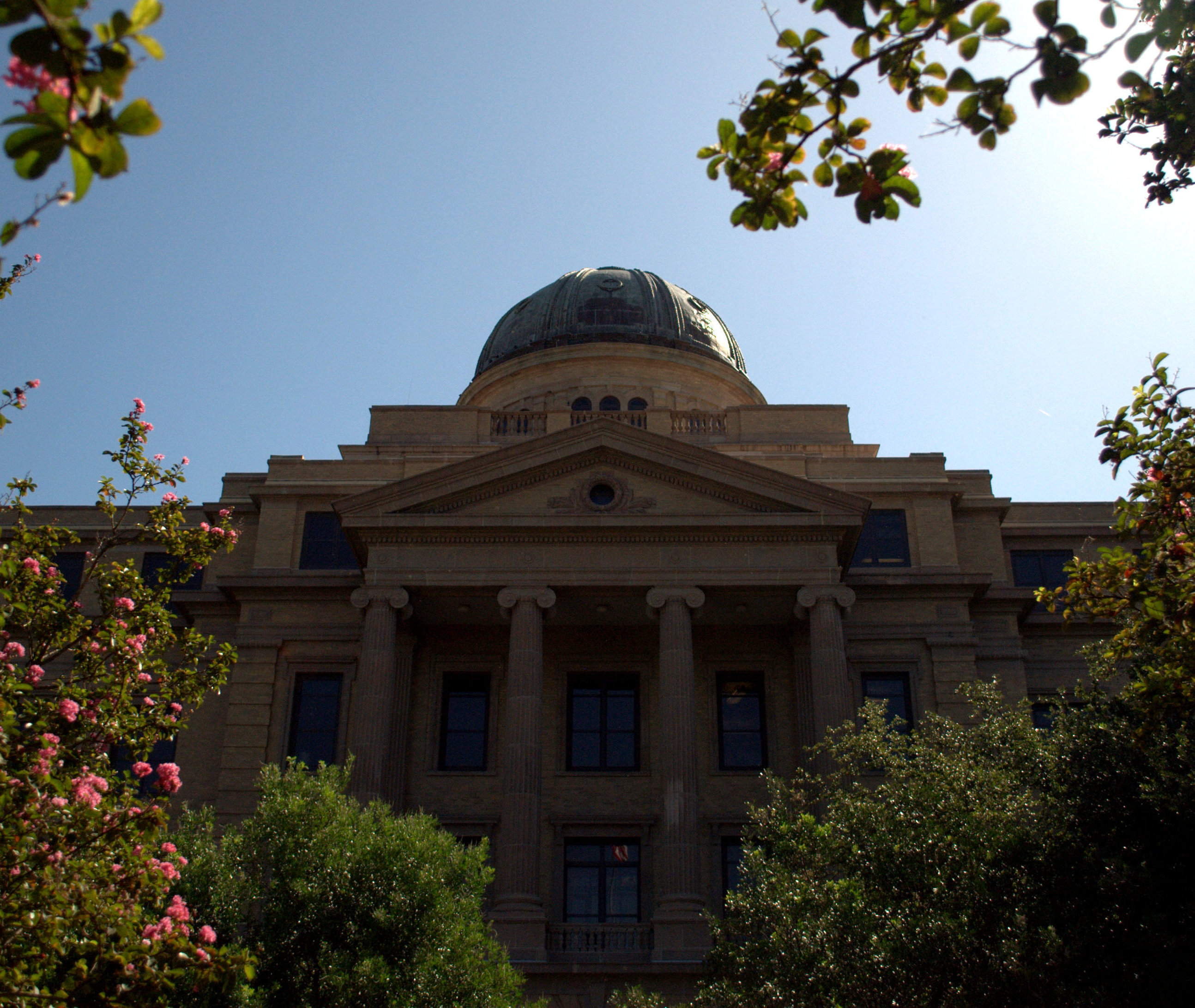
The Main Building at the University of Texas at Austin (left), Lovett Hall at Rice University (middle), and the Academic Building at Texas A&M University (right)

There are 234 colleges and universities in the State of Texas that are listed under the Carnegie Classification of Institutions of Higher Education. These institutions include thirty-four research universities, twenty-nine master's universities, ninety-two undergraduate schools, and seventy-one special-focus institutions. One hundred twenty-three of Texas' post-secondary institutions are private, of which fifty-four are for-profit. One hundred three of the state's post-secondary institutions are public.

Southwestern University is the state's oldest post-secondary institution, having been founded in 1840. Texas A&M University is the state's largest of higher learning in terms of enrollment and largest public university, having 77,491 students while Southwest College for the Deaf is the state's smallest college with an enrollment of 48 in the fall of 2023. Texas is also home to a number of internationally recognized universities, including the University of Texas, Texas A&M University, and Rice University which are ranked among the top two hundred universities in the world.

Texas A&M University and Prairie View A&M University are the state's two public land-grant universities. There are also six Catholic post-secondary institutions, including St. Edward's University, University of Dallas, and University of the Incarnate Word. There are also four Southern Baptist post-secondary institutions in Texas, including Baylor University and Hardin-Simmons University. The state has sixteen medical schools, thirteen conventional and three Osteopathic programs. There are ten law schools, which are accredited by the American Bar Association, including Southern Methodist University Dedman School of Law, Texas Tech University School of Law, and University of Houston Law Center. Two hundred sixteen of Texas post-secondary institutions are officially recognized by the Southern Association of Colleges and Schools Commission on Colleges (SACSCOC), while most are accredited by multiple higher education accreditation agencies.

== Public institutions ==
=== Two-year institutions ===
==== Texas State University System ====
Institution	Location	Founded	Certified Enrollment (Fall 2024)	Carnegie classification
Lamar Institute of Technology	Beaumont (Jefferson County)	1990	5,606	Associate's Colleges: High Career & Technical-High Traditional
Lamar State College–Orange	Orange (Orange County)	1969	3,613	Associate's Colleges:High Career & Technical-Mixed Traditional/Nontraditional
Lamar State College–Port Arthur	Port Arthur (Jefferson County)	1909	4,682	Associate's Colleges: High Career & Technical-High Traditional

==== Public community colleges ====
Institution	Locations	Founded	Certified Enrollment (Fall 2024)	Affiliation	Carnegie classification
Northeast Lakeview College	Universal City (Bexar County)	2007	9,355	Alamo Colleges District	Associate's Colleges High Transfer-Mixed Traditional/Nontraditional
Northwest Vista College	San Antonio (Bexar County)	1995	20,060	Alamo Colleges District	Associate's Colleges High Transfer-Mixed Traditional/Nontraditional
Palo Alto College	San Antonio (Bexar County)	1983	12,395	Alamo Colleges District	Associate's Colleges High Transfer-High Nontraditional
San Antonio College	San Antonio (Bexar County)	1925	19,901	Alamo Colleges District	Associate's Colleges High Transfer-Mixed Traditional/Nontraditional
St. Philip's College (HBCU)	San Antonio (Bexar County)	1898	17,299	Alamo Community College District	Associate's Colleges Mixed Transfer/Career & Technical-High Nontraditional
Alvin Community College	Alvin (Brazoria County)	1948	5,510	Alvin, Danbury, and Pearland school districts	Associate's Colleges High Career & Technical-High Nontraditional
Amarillo College	Amarillo (Potter County); Hereford (Deaf Smith County); Dumas (Moore County)	1929	9,213	Amarillo College District	Associate's Colleges Mixed Transfer/Career & Technical-High Traditional
Angelina College	Lufkin (Angelina County)	1966	3,884	Angelina County Junior College District	Associate's Colleges Mixed Transfer/Career & Technical-Mixed Traditional/Nontraditional
Austin Community College	Austin (Travis County); Cedar Park; Leander; Round Rock (Williamson County); Elgin (Bastrop County); Kyle (Hays County)	1973	36,625	Austin Community College District	Baccalaureate/Associate's Colleges Associate's Dominant
Blinn College	Brenham (Washington County); Bryan (Brazos County); Schulenberg (Fayette County); Sealey (Austin County); Waller (Waller County)	1884	18,089	Blinn College District	Associate's Colleges High Transfer-High Traditional
Brazosport College	Lake Jackson (Brazoria County)	1968	3,814	Brazosport, Columbia-Brazoria, Damon, and Sweeny school districts	Baccalaureate/Associate's Colleges Associate's Dominant
Central Texas College	Killeen (Bell County)	1965	6,429	Killeen and Copperas Cove school districts	Associate's Colleges Mixed Transfer/Career & Technical-High Nontraditional
Cisco College	Cisco (Eastland County); Abilene (Taylor County)	1939	3,190	Cisco and Abilene property tax districts	Associate's Colleges Mixed Transfer/Career & Technical-High Traditional
Clarendon College	Clarendon (Donley County)	1898	1,544	Clarendon College District	Associate's Colleges High Career & Technical-High Nontraditional
Coastal Bend College	Main: Beeville (Bee County); Branches: Alice (Jim Wells County); Kingsville (Kleberg County); Pleasanton (Atascosa County)	1965	3,902	Bee County College District	Associate's Colleges High Career & Technical-High Nontraditional
College of the Mainland	Texas City (Galveston County)	1966	5,134	College of the Mainland District	Associate's Colleges Mixed Transfer/Career & Technical-High Nontraditional
Collin College	Central Park; Preston Ridge; Spring Creek	1985	38,266		
Dallas College	Brookhaven; Cedar Valley; Eastfield; El Centro; Mountain View; North Lake; Richland	1965	64,492		
Del Mar College	Corpus Christi	1935	10,256		
El Paso Community College	Mission del Paso; Northwest; Rio Grande; Transmountain; Valle Verde	1972	24,731		
Frank Phillips College	Borger	1948	1,801		
Galveston College	Galveston	1967	2,404		
Grayson College	Denison	1965	4,146		
Hill College	Hillsboro	1921;1962	4,158		
Houston City College	Houston (Harris County); Katy (Harris County); Missouri City (Wharton County); Stafford (Fort Bend County)	1971	43,925	Houston Community College System District	Associate's Colleges High Transfer-High Traditional
Howard College	Big Spring (Main); San Angelo; Lamesa	1945	3,920	Howard County Junior College District	
Southwest Collegiate Institute for the Deaf	Big Spring	1980	47		Howard County Junior College District
Kilgore College	Kilgore	1935	7,198		
Laredo College	Laredo	1947	11,029		
Lee College	Baytown	1934	8,327		
Lone Star College System	Cy-Fair; Kingwood; Montgomery; North Harris; Tomball; University Park	1972	77,325	Lone Star College System District	Associate's Colleges High Transfer-Mixed Traditional/Nontraditional
McLennan Community College	Waco	1965	7,804		
Midland College	Midland	1972	5,695		
Navarro College	Corsicana (main); Mexia; Midlothian; Waxahachie	1946	6,366		
North Central Texas College	Bowie; Corinth; Gainesville	1924	8,101		
Northeast Texas Community College	Mount Pleasant	1984	3,031		
Odessa College	Odessa	1946	10,050		
Panola College	Carthage	1947	2,708		
Paris Junior College	Paris; Greenville; Sulphur Springs	1924	4,314		
Ranger College	Ranger	1926	2,519		
San Jacinto College	Central; North; South	1961	31,812		
South Plains College	Levelland	1957	9,097		
South Texas College	McAllen (main); Rio Grande City; Weslaco	1993	27,055		
Southwest Texas Junior College	Crystal City; Del Rio; Eagle Pass; Hondo; Medina Valley; Pearsall; Uvalde	1946	5,705		
Tarrant County College	Northeast; Northwest; South; Southeast; Trinity River	1965	43,926	Tarrant County College District	
Temple College	Temple	1926	4,867		
Texarkana College	Texarkana	1927	4,090		
Texas Southmost College	Brownsville	1926	8,828		
Trinity Valley Community College	Athens	1946	5,996		
Tyler Junior College	Tyler	1926	11,858		
Vernon College	Vernon	1972	2,249		
Victoria College	Victoria	1925	3,226		
Weatherford College	Weatherford	1869	6,520		
Western Texas College	Snyder	1969	1,369		
Wharton County Junior College	Wharton	1946	5,504		
Texas State Technical College	Waco (Main); Abilene; Breckenridge; Brownwood; Sweetwater; Fort Bend Count; Harlingen; Marshall; North Texas; Hutto	1969	16,427		

=== Four-year institutions ===
Texas Public Universities and Senior Colleges by system

– Texas A&M University System
– Texas State University System
– Texas Tech University System
- Texas Woman's University System
– University of Houston System
– University of North Texas System
– University of Texas System

– Independent State Universities

==== Texas A&M University System ====
Institution	Founded	Certified Enrollment (Fall 2024)	Campus size (Ac)	Carnegie classification
East Texas A&M University	1889	12,735	140	R2: Doctoral Universities – High research activity
Prairie View A&M University (HBCU)	1876	9,821	1,502	R2: Doctoral Universities – High research activity
Tarleton State University	1899	17,256	1,973	R2: Doctoral Universities – High research activity
Texas A&M International University	1969	8,718	300	M1: Master's Colleges and Universities – Larger programs
Texas A&M University	1876 (Note: Note that the seal contains the date 1876, the year in which Texas A&M began classes. This is not a discrepancy as both 1871 (the year the Texas Legislature appropriated funds to begin A&M's construction) and 1876 can be considered the dates of establishment depending on the definition used and the reference sourced (even within the Texas A&M University system).)	70,666	5,200	R1: Doctoral Universities – Very high research activity
Texas A&M University–Central Texas	2009	2,401	672	M2: Master's Colleges and Universities – Medium programs
Texas A&M University–Corpus Christi	1947	11,266	240	R2: Doctoral Universities – High research activity
Texas A&M University–Kingsville	1925	6,862	1,600	R2: Doctoral Universities – High research activity
Texas A&M University–San Antonio	2009	7,912	700	M1: Master's Colleges and Universities – Larger programs
Texas A&M University–Texarkana	1971	2,361	375	M2: Master's Colleges and Universities – Medium programs
Texas A&M University–Victoria	1971	3,586	20	M1: Master's Colleges and Universities – Larger programs
West Texas A&M University	1910	9,037	342	M1: Master's Colleges and Universities – Larger programs

==== Texas State University System ====
Institution	Founded	Certified Enrollment (Fall 2024)	Campus size (Ac)	Carnegie classification
Lamar University	1923	17,264	299	R2: Doctoral Universities – High research activity
Sam Houston State University	1879	20,336	272	R2: Doctoral Universities – High research activity
Sul Ross State University	1917	1,872	647	M1: Master's Colleges and Universities – Larger programs
Texas State University	1899	40,487	517	R2: Doctoral Universities – High research activity

==== Texas Tech University System ====
Institution	Founded	Certified Enrollment (Fall 2024)	Campus size (Ac)	Carnegie classification
Angelo State University	1928	11,211	268	M1: Master's Colleges and Universities – Larger programs
Midwestern State University	1922	4,880	255	M1: Master's Colleges and Universities – Larger programs
Texas Tech University	1923	40,060	1,839	R1: Doctoral Universities – Very high research activity

==== Texas Woman's University System ====
Institution	Founded	Certified Enrollment (Fall 2024)	Campus size (Ac)	Carnegie classification
Texas Woman's University	1901	14,895	270	R2: Doctoral Universities – High research activity

==== University of Houston System ====
Institution	Founded	Certified Enrollment (Fall 2024)	Campus size (Ac)	Carnegie classification
University of Houston	1927	47,774	667	R1: Doctoral Universities – Very high research activity
University of Houston–Clear Lake	1971	8,137	524	D/PU: Doctoral/Professional Universities
University of Houston–Downtown	1974	13,730	20	M1: Master's Colleges and Universities – Larger programs

==== University of North Texas System ====
Institution	Founded	Certified Enrollment (Fall 2024)	Campus size (Ac)	Carnegie classification
University of North Texas	1890	46,180	900	R1: Doctoral Universities – Very high research activity
University of North Texas at Dallas	2000	3,774	264	M1: Master's Colleges and Universities – Larger programs

==== University of Texas System ====
Institution	Founded	Certified Enrollment (Fall 2024)	Campus size (Ac)	Carnegie classification
University of Texas at Arlington	1895	41,613	420	R1: Doctoral Universities – Very high research activity
University of Texas at Austin	1883	53,665	431	R1: Doctoral Universities – Very high research activity
University of Texas at Dallas	1969	29,886	445	R1: Doctoral Universities – Very high research activity
University of Texas at El Paso	1913	25,039	366	R1: Doctoral Universities – Very high research activity
University of Texas at San Antonio	1969	35,770	747	R1: Doctoral Universities – Very high research activity
University of Texas at Tyler	1971	10,089	259	R2: Doctoral Universities – High research activity
University of Texas Permian Basin	1973	4,963	644	M1: Master's Colleges and Universities – Larger programs
University of Texas Rio Grande Valley	2013 (Note: UTRGV was formally founded in 2013 and entered full operation in 2015, following the merger of the University of Texas–Pan American (UTPA), founded in 1927, and the University of Texas at Brownsville (UTB), founded in 1991.)	33,578	665	R2: Doctoral Universities – High research activity
Stephen F. Austin State University	1923	10,472	406	M1: Master's Colleges and Universities – Larger programs

==== Independent public universities ====
Institution	Founded	Certified Enrollment (Fall 2024)	Campus size (Ac)	Carnegie classification
Texas Southern University (HBCU)	1927	8,704	100	R2: Doctoral Universities – High research activity

=== Special-focus and graduate institutions ===
==== Texas Tech University System ====
Institution	Founded	Certified Enrollment (Fall 2024)	Campus size (Ac)	Carnegie classification
Texas Tech University; Health Sciences Center	1969	4,985		Special Focus Four-Year: Research Institution
Texas Tech University; Health Sciences Center El Paso	2013	997		Special Focus Four-Year: Medical Schools & Centers

==== University of North Texas System ====
Institution	Founded	Certified Enrollment (Fall 2024)	Campus size (Ac)	Carnegie classification
University of North Texas; Health Science Center	1970	2,300	33	Special Focus Four-Year: Medical Schools & Centers

==== University of Texas System ====
Institution	Founded	Certified Enrollment (Fall 2024)	Campus size (Ac)	Carnegie classification
University of Texas; Health Science Center at Houston	1972	4,929		Special Focus Four-Year: Research Institution
University of Texas; Health Science Center at San Antonio	1959	3,762	250	Special Focus Four-Year: Research Institution
University of Texas; MD Anderson Cancer Center	1941	359	2	Special Focus Four-Year: Other Health Professions Schools
University of Texas; Southwestern Medical Center	1943	2,549	231	Special Focus Four-Year: Research Institution
University of Texas; Medical Branch at Galveston	1891	3,168	350	Special Focus Four-Year: Research Institution

== Independent institutions ==
=== Two-year institutions ===
Institution	Founded	Certified Enrollment (Fall 2024)	Campus size (Ac)	Carnegie classification	Affiliation
Jacksonville College	1899	544	20	Associate's Colleges High Transfer-High Nontraditional	Baptist Missionary Association of America

=== Four-year institutions ===
Private (NFP) university locations

Institution	Founded	Certified Enrollment (Fall 2024)	Campus size (Ac)	Carnegie classification	Affiliation
Abilene Christian University	1906	6,262	208	D/PU: Doctoral/Professional Universities	Churches of Christ
Amberton University	1971	712	5	M1: Master's Colleges and Universities – Larger programs	Nondenominational Christianity
Austin College	1849	1,217	100	Baccalaureate Colleges: Arts & Sciences Focus	Presbyterian Church (USA)
Baylor University	1845	20,626	800	R1: Doctoral Universities – Very high research activity	Baptist General Convention of Texas
Concordia University Texas	1926	1,420	380	M1: Master's Colleges and Universities – Larger programs	Lutheran Church – Missouri Synod
Criswell College	1970	160	4	Baccalaureate Colleges: Diverse Fields	Southern Baptists of Texas Convention
Dallas Baptist University	1898	4,132	292	D/PU: Doctoral/Professional Universities	Baptist General Convention of Texas
East Texas Baptist University	1912	1,959	253	M3: Master's Colleges and Universities – Small programs	Baptist General Convention of Texas
Hardin-Simmons University	1891	1,665	220	D/PU: Doctoral/Professional Universities	Baptist General Convention of Texas
Houston Christian University	1960	4,271	158	M1: Master's Colleges and Universities – Larger programs	Baptist General Convention of Texas
Howard Payne University	1889	808	80	Baccalaureate Colleges: Diverse Fields	Baptist General Convention of Texas
Huston–Tillotson University (HBCU)	1875	1,059	23	Baccalaureate Colleges: Diverse Fields	United Methodist Church
Jarvis Christian University (HBCU)	1912	622	1,000	Baccalaureate Colleges: Diverse Fields	Disciples of Christ
LeTourneau University	1946	3,031	162	M2: Master's Colleges and Universities – Medium programs	Ecumenism
Lubbock Christian University	1957	1,595	155	M2: Master's Colleges and Universities – Medium programs	Churches of Christ
McMurry University	1923	3,175	52	Baccalaureate Colleges: Diverse Fields	United Methodist Church
Nelson University	1927	1,435	73	M3: Master's Colleges and Universities – Small programs	Assemblies of God USA
Our Lady of the Lake University	1895	1,968	72	D/PU: Doctoral/Professional Universities	Roman Catholic - Sisters of Divine Providence
Paul Quinn College (HBCU)	1872	611	146	Baccalaureate Colleges: Diverse Fields	African Methodist Episcopal Church
Rice University	1912	8,961	295	R1: Doctoral Universities – Very high research activity	Nonsectarian
Saint Edward's University	1877	3,033		M1: Master's Colleges and Universities – Larger programs	Roman Catholic - Holy Cross
St. Mary's University	1852	3,248	135	M1: Master's Colleges and Universities – Larger programs	Roman Catholic - Marianist
Schreiner University	1923	1,326	212	M3: Master's Colleges and Universities – Small programs	Presbyterian Church (USA)
Southern Methodist University	1911	12,114	230	R2: Doctoral Universities – High research activity	United Methodist Church
Southwestern Adventist University	1893	766	150	Baccalaureate Colleges: Diverse Fields	Seventh-day Adventist Church
Southwestern Christian College (HBCU)	1948	110	25	Baccalaureate/Associate's Colleges: Associate's Dominant	Churches of Christ
Southwestern University	1840	1,440	701	Baccalaureate Colleges: Arts & Sciences Focus	United Methodist Church
Texas Christian University	1873	12,851	325	R2: Doctoral Universities – High research activity	Disciples of Christ
Texas College (HBCU)	1894	633	25	Baccalaureate Colleges: Diverse Fields	Christian Methodist Episcopal Church
Texas Lutheran University	1891	1,417	184	Baccalaureate Colleges: Diverse Fields	Evangelical Lutheran Church in America
Texas Wesleyan University	1890	2,529	75	D/PU: Doctoral/Professional Universities	United Methodist Church
Trinity University	1869	2,741	125	Baccalaureate Colleges: Arts & Sciences Focus	Nonsectarian
University of Dallas	1956	2,078	220	M1: Master's Colleges and Universities – Larger programs	Roman Catholic
University of Mary Hardin-Baylor	1845	3,321	340	D/PU: Doctoral/Professional Universities	Baptist General Convention of Texas
University of St. Thomas	1947	4,292	33	D/PU: Doctoral/Professional Universities	Roman Catholic - Basilians
University of the Incarnate Word	1881	6,434	154	D/PU: Doctoral/Professional Universities	Roman Catholic - Sisters of Charity
Wayland Baptist University	1908	2,273	80	M1: Master's Colleges and Universities – Larger programs	Baptist General Convention of Texas
Wiley University (HBCU)	1873	783	55	Baccalaureate Colleges: Diverse Fields	United Methodist Church

=== Graduate legal and health-related institutions ===
Institution	Location	Founded	Certified Enrollment (Fall 2024)	Carnegie classification	Affiliation
South Texas College of Law	Houston	1923	1,082	Special Focus Four-Year Law Schools	Nonsectarian
Baylor College of Medicine	Houston	1900	1,740	Special Focus Four-Year Research Institution	Nonsectarian
Parker University	Dallas	1982	2,247	M1: Master's Colleges and Universities – Larger programs	Nonsectarian
Texas Chiropractic College	Pasadena	1908	261	Special Focus Four-Year Other Health Professions Schools	Nonsectarian

=== Special-focus institutions ===
Institution	Founded	Enrollment (Fall 2022)	Campus size (Ac)	Endowment (FY23 millions)	Carnegie classification	Affiliation
Arlington Baptist University	1939	218	35	TBD	Baccalaureate Colleges: Diverse Fields	World Baptist Fellowship
Baptist University of the Americas	1947	109	60	TBD	M1: Master's Colleges and Universities – Larger programs	Baptist General Convention of Texas
Dallas Christian College	1950	247	20	TBD	Baccalaureate Colleges: Diverse Fields	Christian churches and churches of Christ
Hallmark University	1969	876	20	$0.6	Baccalaureate Colleges: Diverse Fields	Nondenominational Christianity
North American University	2007	827	12	$0	M2: Master's Colleges and Universities – Medium programs	Nonsectarian

=== Other non-profit four-year satellite institutions ===
Institution	Locations	Founded	Certified Enrollment (Fall 2023)	Endowment (FY23 millions)	Carnegie classification	Affiliation
Park University	El Paso Campus Center; Fort Bliss Campus Center					
Lipscomb University						
Remington College						
Western Governors University	Online					

== For-profit institutions ==
=== Two-year institutions ===
- Auguste Escoffier School of Culinary Arts-Austin
- Center for Advanced Legal Studies
- Concorde Career College-Dallas
- Concorde Career College-Grand Prairie
- Concorde Career College-San Antonio
- Culinary Institute Inc
- Florida Career College-Houston
- Fortis College
- Houston International College Cardiotech Ultrasound School
- Interactive College of Technology
- KD Conservatory College of Film and Dramatic Arts
- Lincoln College of Technology-Grand Prairie
- MediaTech Institute-Dallas
- MediaTech Institute-Houston
- Pima Medical Institute-El Paso
- Pima Medical Institute-Houston
- Rio Grande Valley College
- School of Automotive Machinists & Technology
- Southern Careers Institute-Austin
- Texas Healthtech Institute, Beaumont
- Texas Healthtech Institute at Houston
- The College of Health Care Professions-Austin
- The College of Health Care Professions-Dallas
- The College of Health Care Professions-Fort Worth
- The College of Health Care Professions-McAllen Campus
- The College of Health Care Professions-San Antonio
- The College of Health Care Professions-South San Antonio
- The College of Health Care Professions-Southwest Houston
- Universal Technical Institute-Dallas Fort Worth
- Vet Tech Institute of Houston

=== Four-year institutions ===
- American College of Acupuncture and Oriental Medicine
- American InterContinental University-Houston
- AOMA Graduate School of Integrative Medicine
- Baptist Health System School of Health Professions
- Chamberlain University-Texas
- DeVry University-Texas
- Galen College of Nursing-San Antonio
- Gemini School of Visual Arts & Communication
- South University-Austin
- Southwest University at El Paso
- Strayer University-Texas
- Texas Health and Science University
- The Art Institute of Austin
- The Art Institute of Houston
- The Art Institute of San Antonio
- The College of Health Care Professions-Northwest
- University of Phoenix-Texas
- Wade College
- West Coast University-Dallas
- Western Technical College

== Medical schools ==
- McGovern Medical School
- Baylor College of Medicine
- UTSW
- UTMB
- UT Tyler
- Dell Medical School
- The University of Houston

== Theological institutions ==
- Austin Presbyterian Theological Seminary
- Bakke Graduate University
- B. H. Carroll Theological Institute
- Baptist Missionary Association Theological Seminary
- Baylor University
- Brite Divinity School
- Criswell College
- Christ Mission College
- College of Biblical Studies
- Dallas Theological Seminary
- Episcopal Theological Seminary of the Southwest
- George W. Truett Theological Seminary (part of Baylor University)
- Grace School of Theology
- Houston Graduate School of Theology
- The King's University
- Logsdon School of Theology (part of Hardin-Simmons University)
- Messenger College
- Oblate School of Theology
- Perkins School of Theology (Part of Southern Methodist University)
- Redeemers University North America
- Seminary of the Southwest
- Southern Reformed Seminary
- Southwestern Christian College
- Southwestern Baptist Theological Seminary

== Defunct institutions ==
- Adair Normal School
- Bay View College
- Belle Plain College
- Benton City Institute
- Bishop College HBCU (closed in 1988; site is the current home of Paul Quinn College)
- Blanco Masonic University
- Bosque College and Seminary
- Bryan Baptist Academy
- Burleson College
- Burnetta College
- Butler College
- Carr–Burdette College
- Centenary College
- Central Nazarene College
- Central Plains Academy
- Central Plains College and Conservatory of Music
- Central Texas College
- Chapel Hill College
- Chappell Hill Female College
- Cherokee Junior College
- Christian College of the Southwest
- Christopher College of Corpus Christi
- Clebarro College
- Colegio Jacinto Treviño
- College of Saints John Fisher & Thomas More
- Colorado College
- Columbia College
- Concrete College
- Cumberland College
- Dallas Medical College
- Daniel Baker College
- Dixie University
- Dominican College
- Eastern Texas Female College
- Eastman College and Conservatory
- Emerson College
- Evangelical Lutheran College
- Fairfield Female College
- Fort Worth Christian College
- Fort Worth University
- Galveston University
- Goodnight College
- Grayson College
- Guadalupe College HBCU (closed in 1936 after fire destroyed main building)
- Gunter Bible College
- Henderson Male and Female College
- Henry College
- Hereford Christian College
- Hermann University
- Houston International University
- Jacinto Treviño College
- Jefferson School of Law and Jefferson University
- Jefferson University
- Juarez-Lincoln University
- Kidd-Key College
- Lagarto College
- Larissa College
- Liberty Normal and Business College
- Live Oak Female Seminary
- Lockney Christian College
- Lon Morris College HBCU (defunct Methodist; filed for bankruptcy in 2012)*Massey Business College
- Luther Rice Baptist Female College
- Mansfield Male and Female College
- Marshall University
- Marvin College
- Mary Allen Junior College [HBCU]
- Mary Nash College
- Masonic Female Institute
- McKenzie College
- McMullen College
- Meridian Junior College
- Midland Christian College
- Midland College
- Midlothian College
- Mineral Wells College
- Mount Enterprise Male and Female College
- Nacogdoches University
- Nazarene Bible Institute
- North Texas Baptist College
- Our Lady of Victory College
- Paine Female Institute
- Palestine Female College
- Paluxy College
- Parker Institute
- Peniel College
- Randolph College
- Reynolds Presbyterian College
- Rutersville College
- Sabinal Christian College
- Sabine Baptist College
- Sabine Valley University
- Salado College
- Samuel Huston College
- San Antonio Female College
- San Saba Masonic College
- Savoy Male and Female College
- Seth Ward College
- Seven Points College
- Shiloh Baptist Institute
- Soule University
- South Texas Baptist College
- South Texas Junior College
- Southeast Texas Male and Female College
- Southern Bible College
- Southern Methodist University College of Medicine
- Southland University
- St. Basil's College
- St. Mary's College
- St. Mary's University (Galveston, Texas)
- St. Paul's College
- Stamford College
- Stephenville College
- Tehuacana Academy
- Texana Academy
- Texas Baptist University
- Texas Holiness University
- Texas Presbyterian College
- Texas Presbyterian College For Girls
- Texas Presbyterian University
- Texas Synodical Female College
- Texas Wesleyan College
- Tharp Spring Christian College
- Thornton Institute
- Thorp Spring Christian College
- Tillotson College
- Trinity Lutheran College
- Trinity Valley Baptist College Association
- Trinity Valley Chemurgic Institute
- Tri-State College
- Tyler Female College
- Tyler University
- University of Dallas
- University of Eastern Texas
- University of Plano
- University of San Antonio
- University of San Augustine
- University of Texas at Brownsville
- University of Texas–Pan American
- Upshur Masonic College
- Vatterott College
- Waco Female College
- Waco University
- Wesley College
- Wesleyan College
- West Texas Normal and Business College
- Westminster College
- Westminster Junior College and Bible Institute
- Wharton College
- William Carey Crane College
- Willis Male and Female College
- Woodcrest College and Conference Center

Defunct For-profit colleges

- The Art Institute of Houston
- American Commercial College
- Central Western University
- Virginia College
- Westwood College
- Le Cordon Bleu Institute of Culinary Arts – Dallas
- Westwood College
- International Academy of Design and Technology San Antonio

Defunct Theological institutions

- Austin Graduate School of Theology (Closed 2023)

== See also ==
- Education in Texas
- History of education in Texas
- Higher education in the United States
- List of American institutions of higher education
- List of college athletic programs in Texas
- List of colleges and universities
- List of colleges and universities in Houston
- List of Dallas-Fort Worth area colleges and universities
- List of largest Texas universities by enrollment
- List of recognized higher education accreditation organizations
