= List of education facilities in San Antonio =

Education in the U.S. city of San Antonio, Texas hosts over 100,000 students across its 31 higher-education facilities which include the University of Texas at San Antonio, Texas A&M University-San Antonio, and the Alamo Community College District's five colleges. Other schools include St. Mary's University, the University of the Incarnate Word, Trinity University, and Wayland Baptist University. The San Antonio Public Library serves all of these institutions along with the 17 school districts within San Antonio.

The city is also home to more than 30 private schools and charter schools. These schools include San Antonio Academy, Holy Cross High School, Incarnate Word High School, St. Anthony Catholic High School.

== Colleges, universities, and research institutes ==
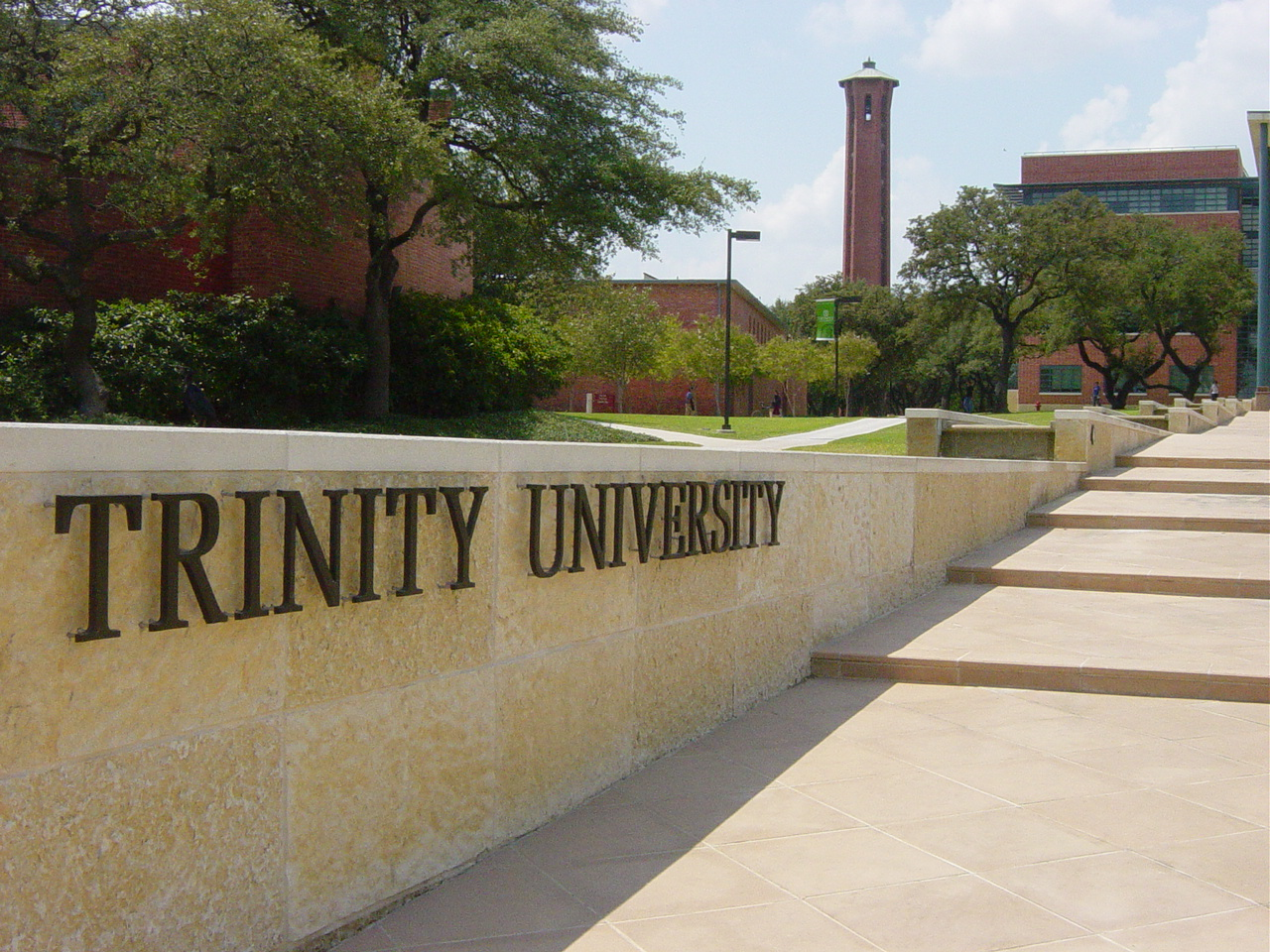
Trinity University

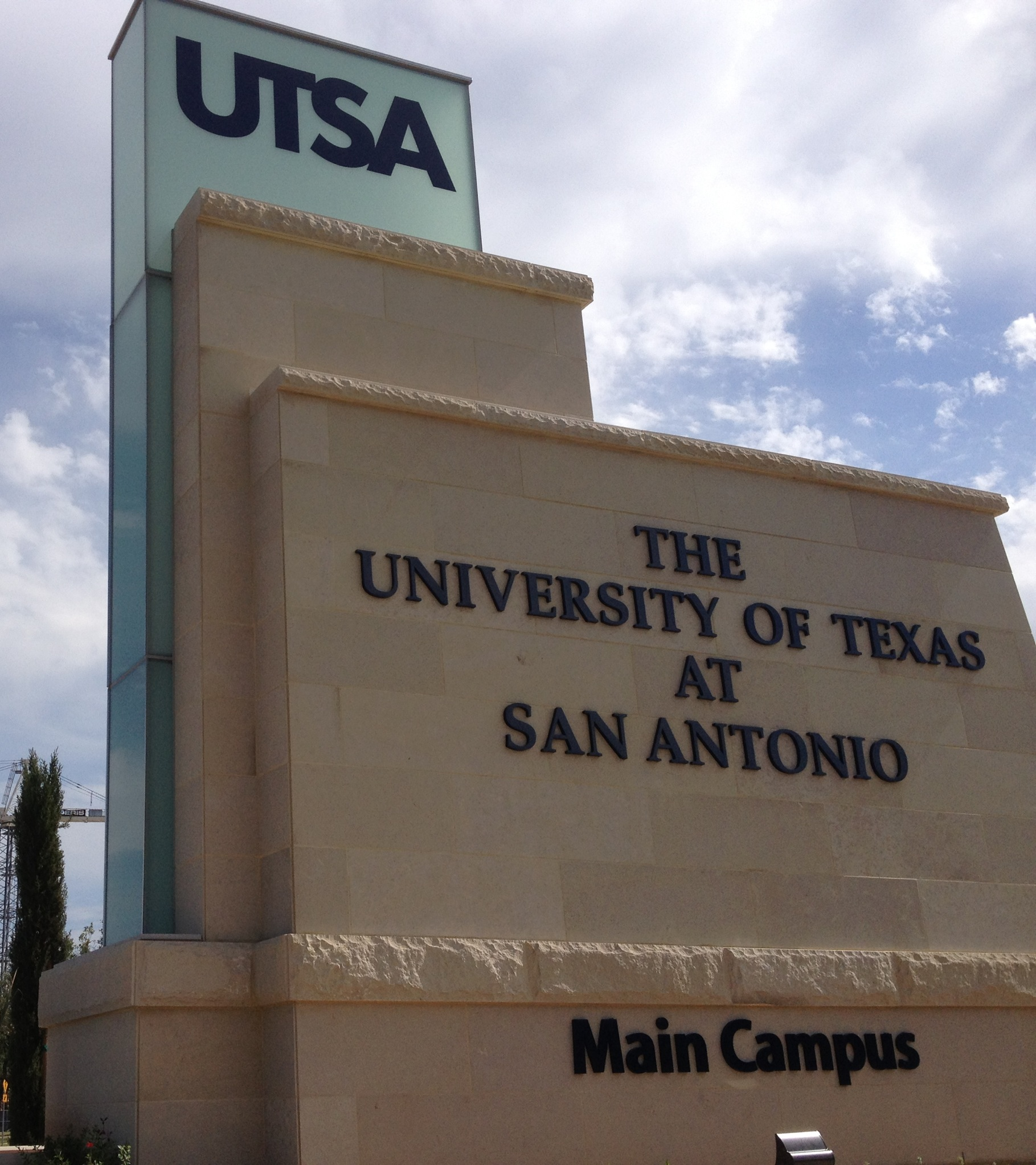
UTSA

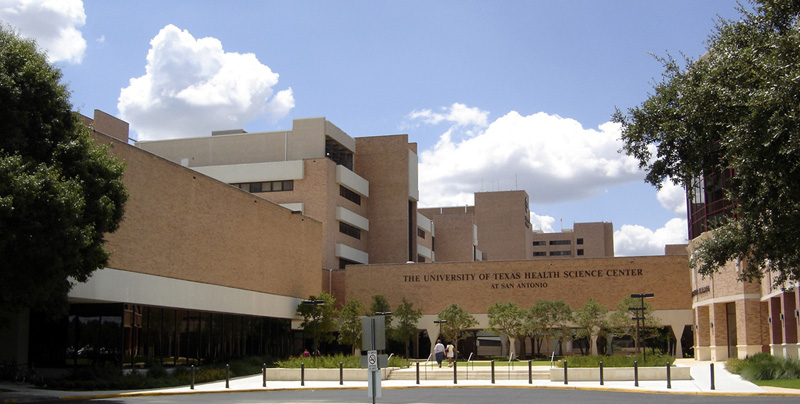
University of Texas Health Science Center at San Antonio

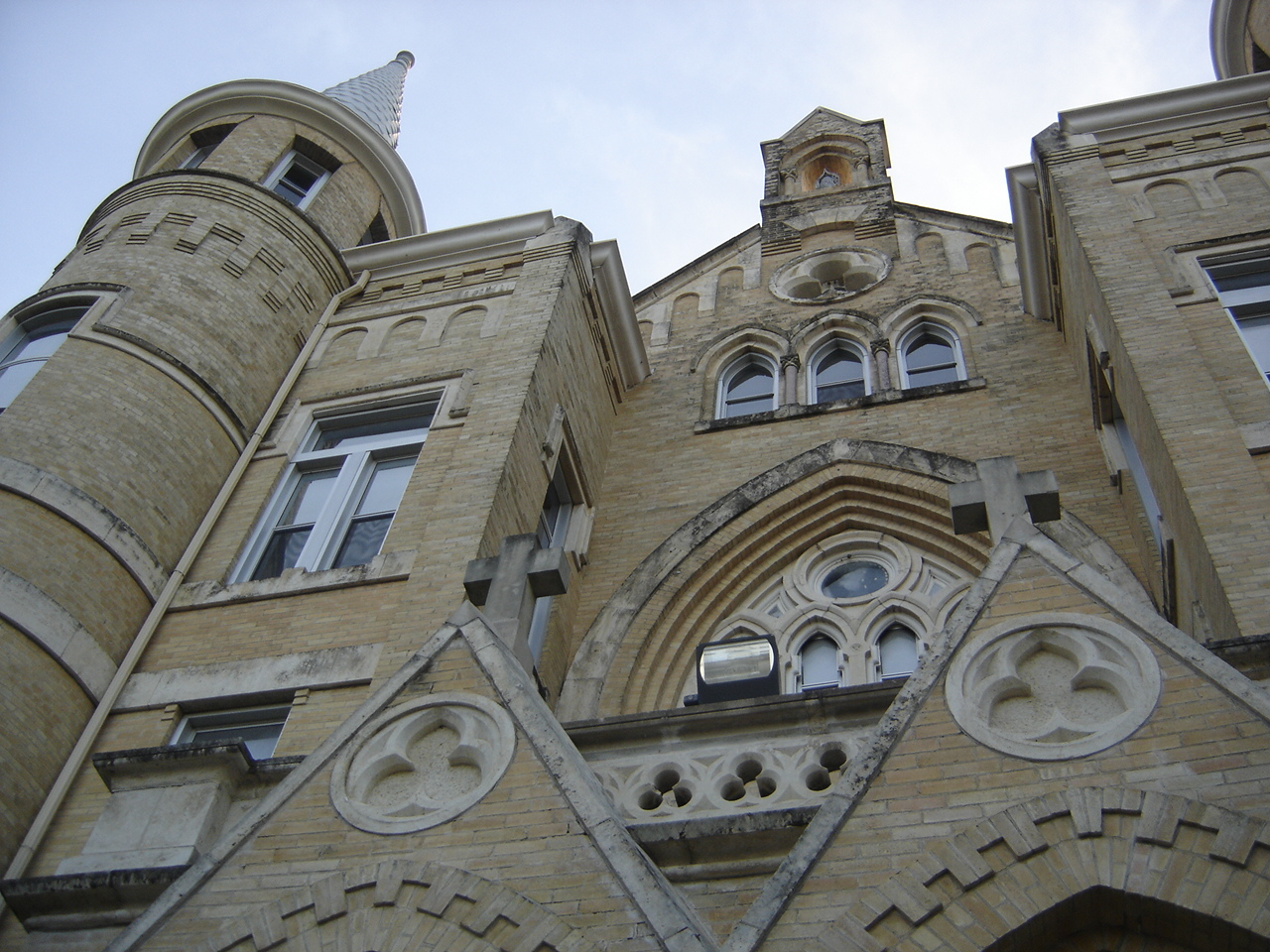
Our Lady of the Lake University

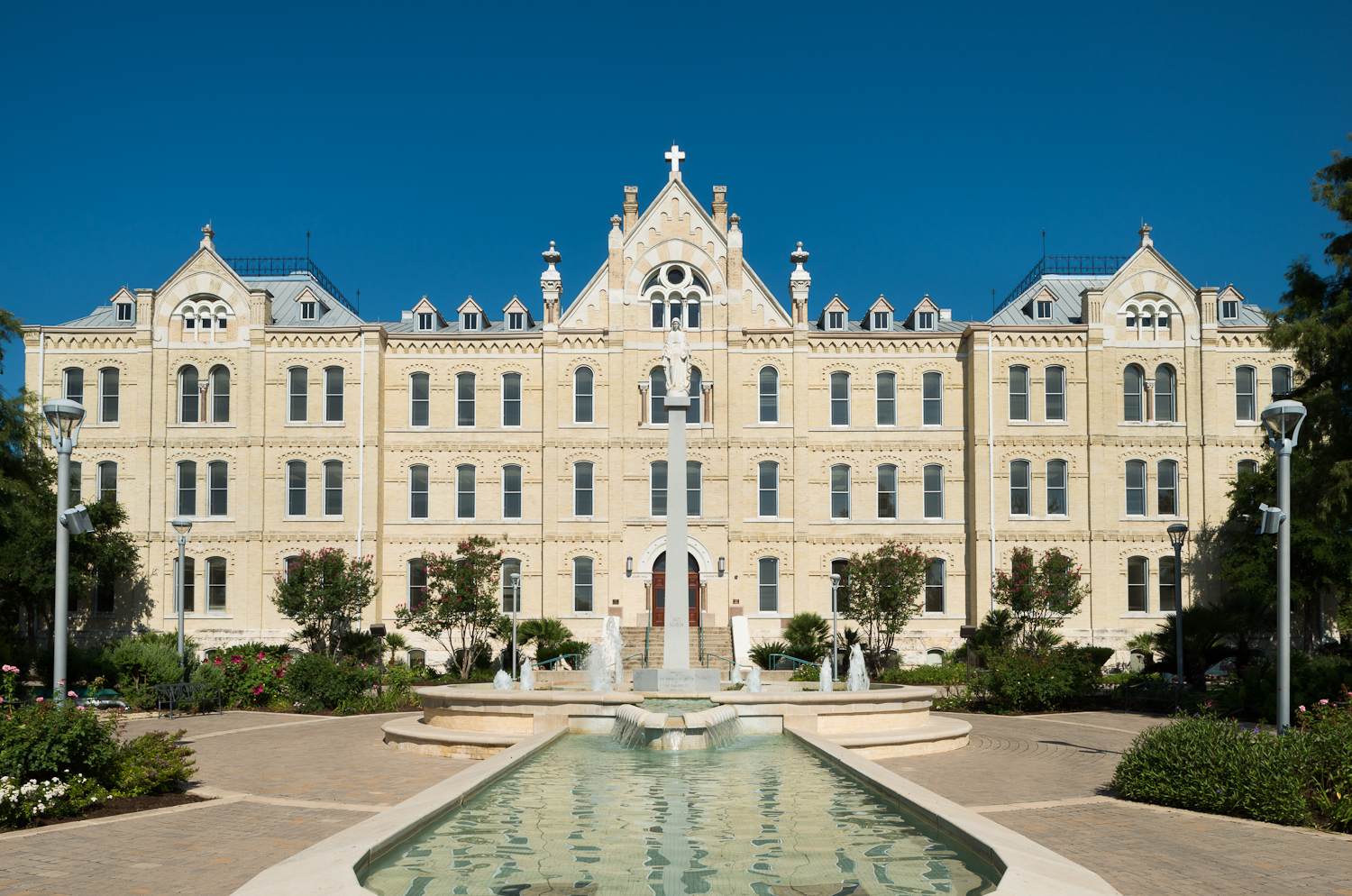
St. Mary's University

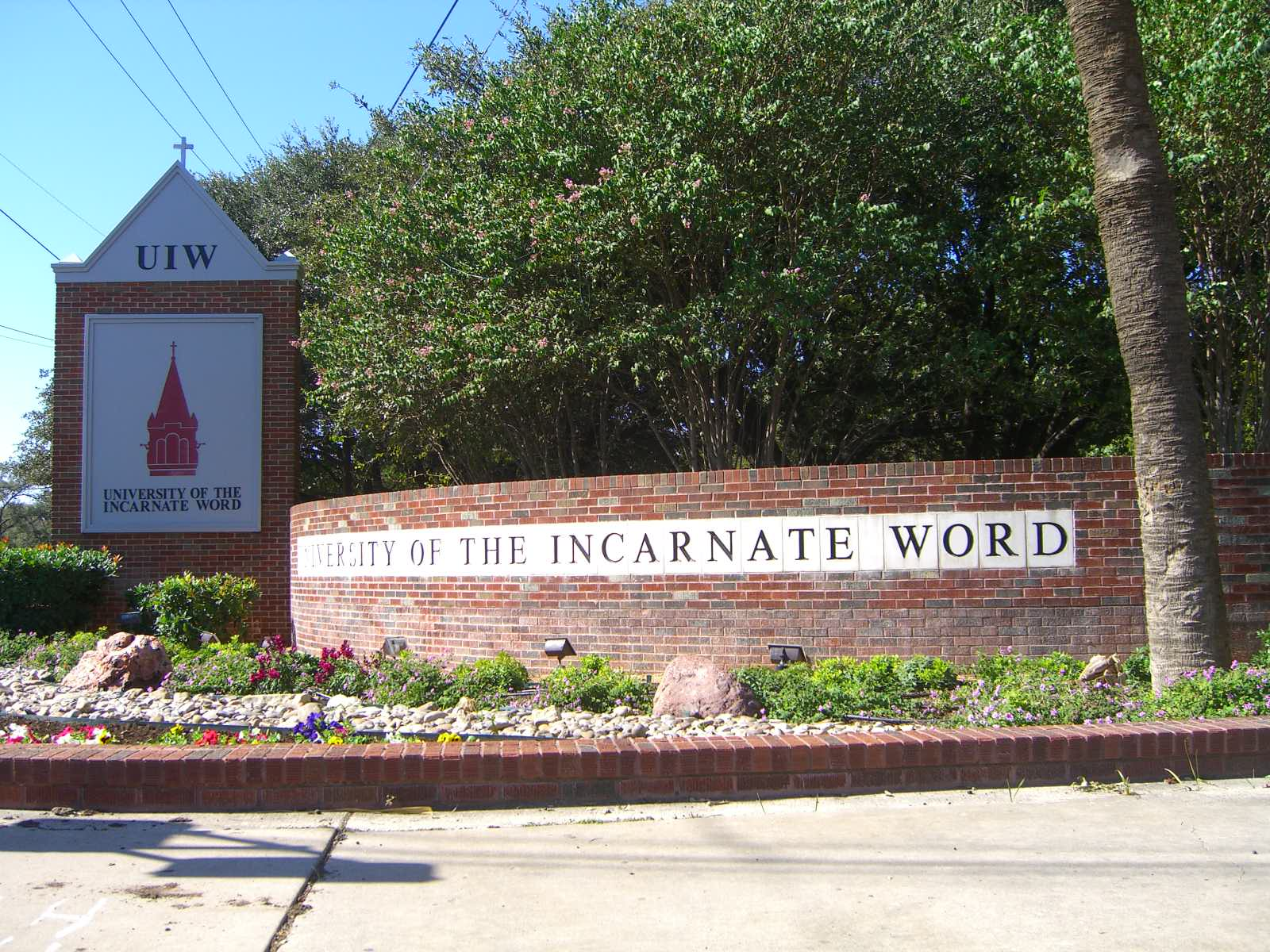
University of the Incarnate Word

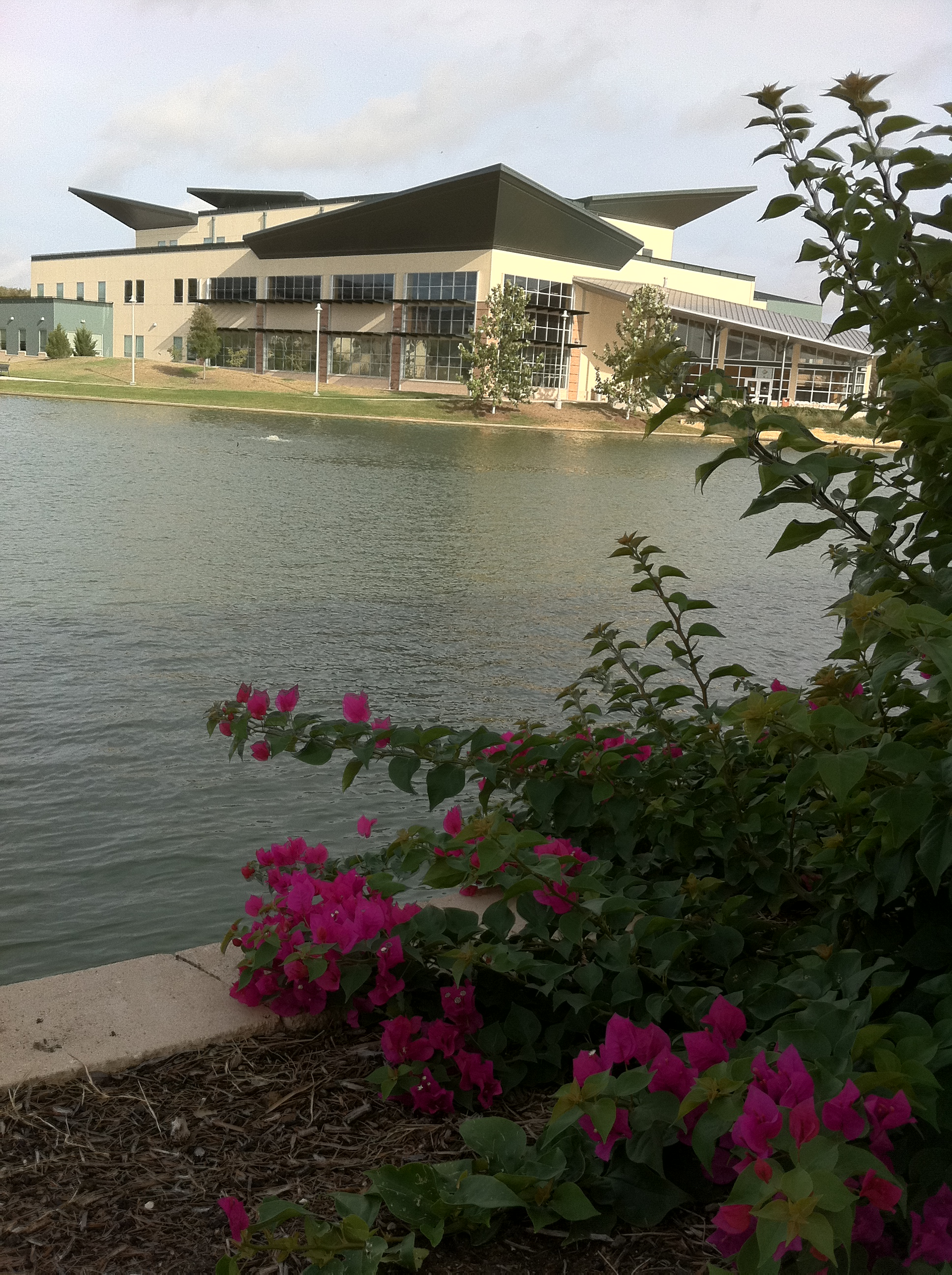
Northwest Vista College

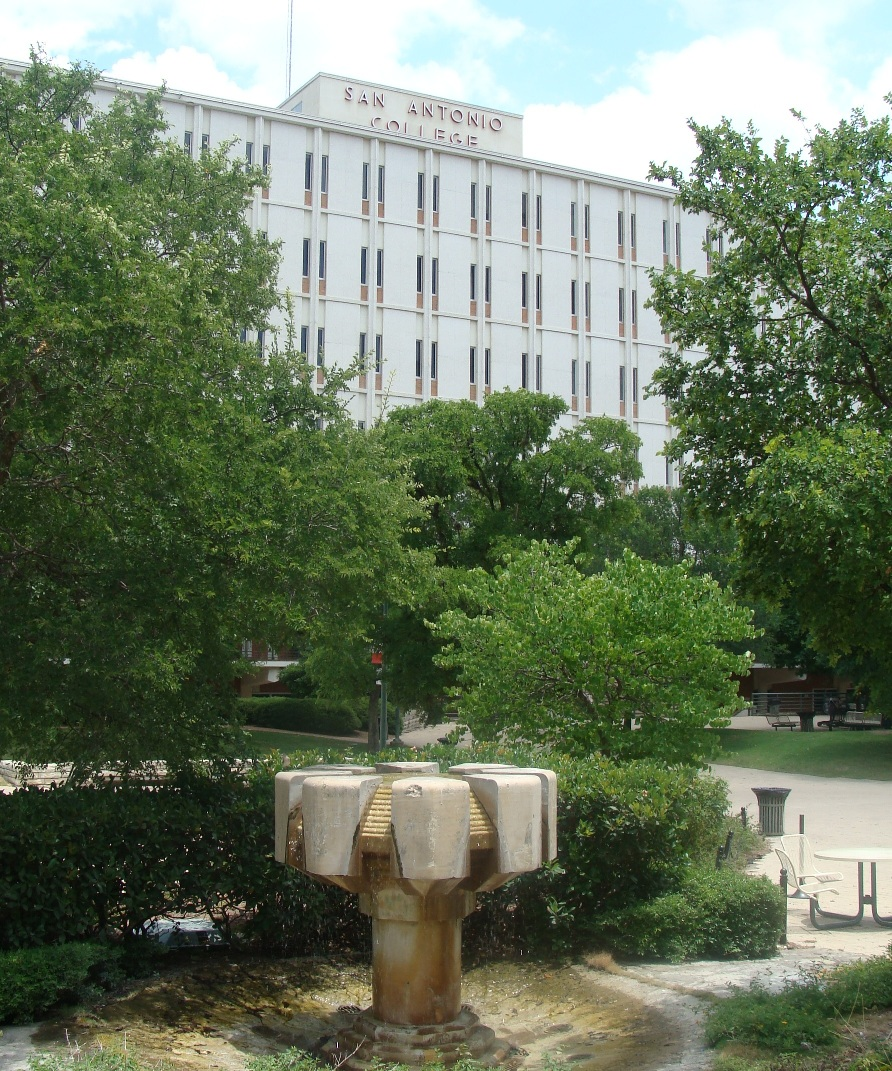
San Antonio College

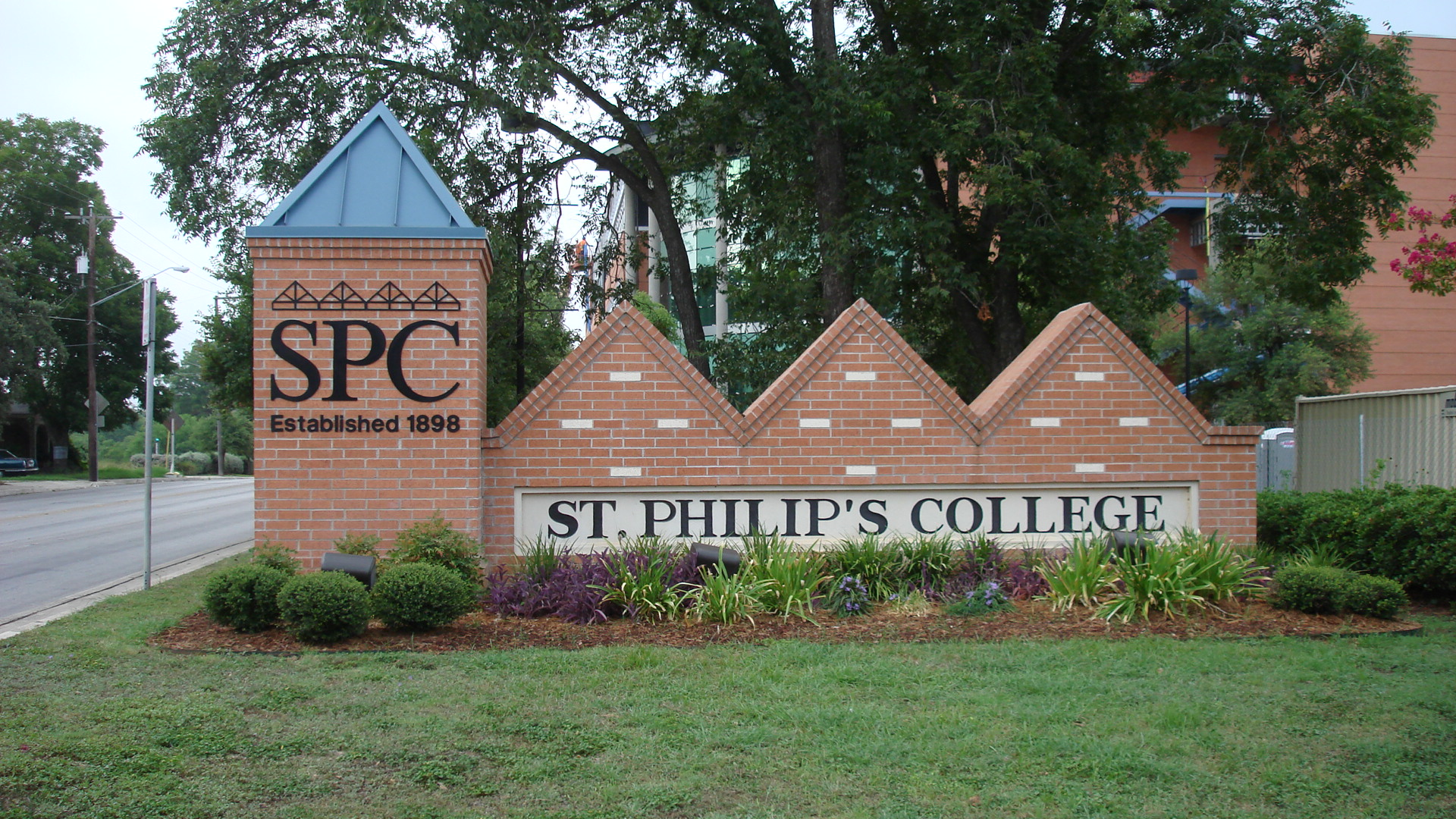
St. Philip's College

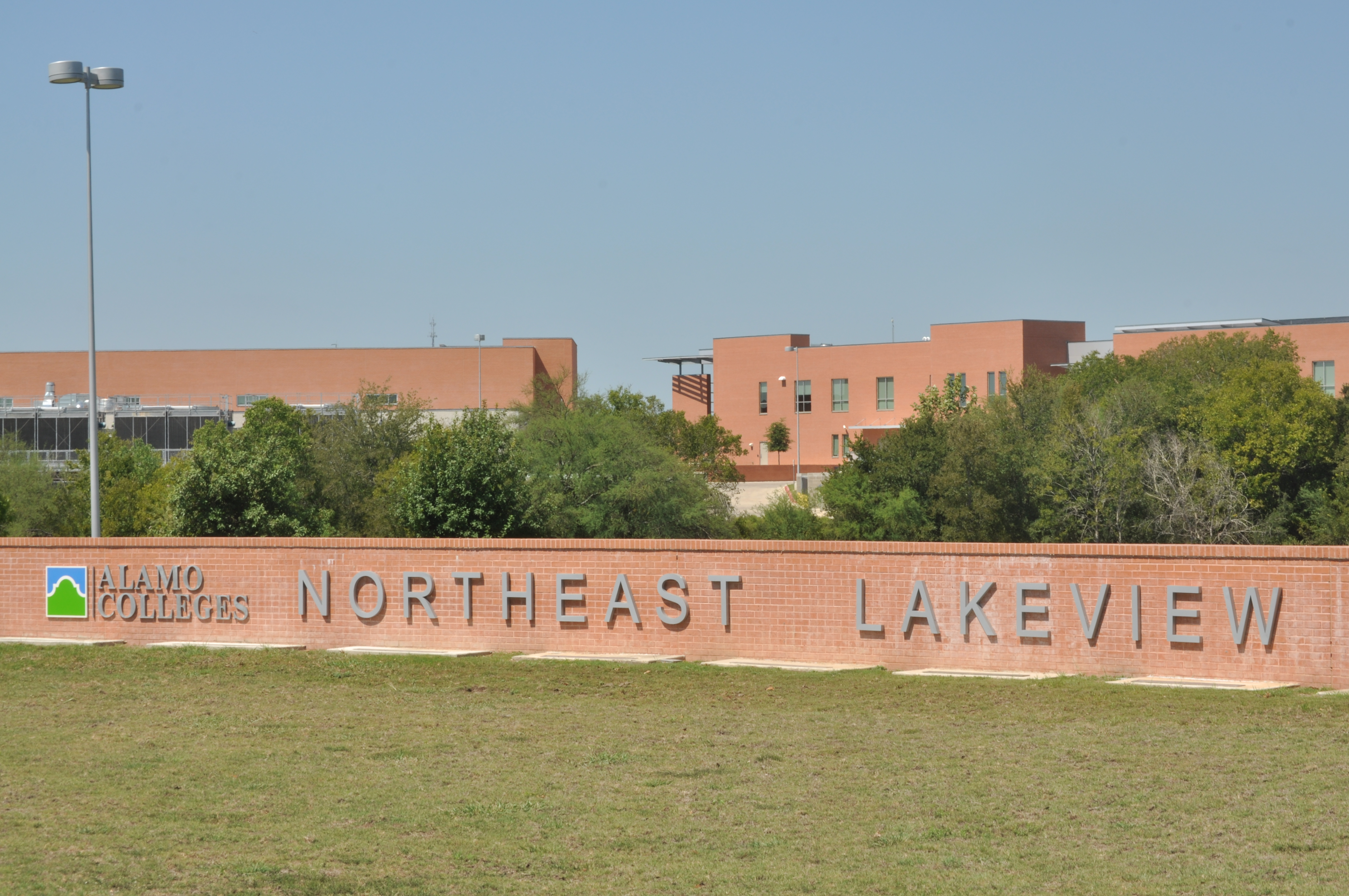
Northeast Lakeview College
- Alamo Community College District
  - Northeast Lakeview College
  - Northwest Vista College
  - Palo Alto College
  - San Antonio College
  - St. Philip's College
- Baptist University of the Américas
- Cancer Therapy & Research Center
- Concordia University Texas - San Antonio
- Culinary Institute of America - San Antonio
- Everest Institute
- Hallmark University
- Mind Science Foundation
- Oblate School of Theology
- Our Lady of the Lake University
- Southwest Foundation for Biomedical Research
- Southwest Research Institute
- St. Mary's University
- St. Mary's University School of Law
- Texas A&M University–San Antonio
- Trinity University
- University of Texas at San Antonio
- University of Texas Health Science Center at San Antonio
- University of Phoenix - San Antonio
- University of the Incarnate Word
- Wayland Baptist University
- Webster University

== Public schools and libraries ==
The city of San Antonio is also served by the following independent school districts (ISDs):

- Alamo Heights
- East Central
- Edgewood
- Fort Sam Houston
- Harlandale
- Judson
- North East
- Northside
- San Antonio
- South San Antonio
- Southside
- Southwest
- Somerset

The city is served by the San Antonio Public Library.

=== Charter schools ===
- Anne Frank Inspire Academy
- BASIS San Antonio Primary Medical Center
- BASIS San Antonio Primary North Central
- BASIS San Antonio Shavano
- Brooks Academy of Science and Engineering
- Brooks Collegiate Academy
- Brooks Lone Star Academy
- Brooks Oaks Academy
- Compass Rose Academy
- Foundation School for Autism
- Founders Classical Academy of Schertz
- Great Hearts Monte Vista
- Great Hearts Northern Oaks
- Great Hearts Western Hills
- Harmony Science Academy San Antonio
- Jubilee Academies
- KIPP San Antonio Public Schools
  - KIPP Aspire
  - KIPP Camino
  - KIPP Esperanza Dual Language Academy
  - KIPP Poder
  - KIPP Un Mundo Dual Language Academy
  - KIPP University Prep
- Eleanor Kolitz Hebrew Language Academy (EKHLA) - It was the first Hebrew language-based charter school in the state. In the 2017–2018 school year, it had 320 students. It previously was located in the San Antonio Jewish Community Harry and Jeanette Weinberg Campus, but in 2019 moved to a new facility as the former one became occupied by the private San Antonio International Academy. The school began having three classes in the Kindergarten and first grade levels and will expand each subsequent grade level per year, and it expects its new campus to eventually house 650 students. In 2019 the school leadership stated that it does not wish to have high school grades even though the school's charter permits this.
- School of Science and Technology - Alamo
- School of Science and Technology - Discovery
- School of Science and Technology - Northwest
- School of Science and Technology - San Antonio
- Southwest Preparatory School Northeast
- Southwest Preparatory School Northwest
- Southwest Preparatory School Southeast

Closed

- Academy of Careers and Technologies - In 2014 the school was to automatically lose its charter under Texas Education Agency (TEA) rules.
- Alameda School for Art & Design - In 2014 the school was to automatically lose its charter under TEA rules.
- City Center Health Careers - In 2014 the school was to automatically lose its charter under TEA rules.
- Henry Ford Academy (senior high school) - In 2014 it had 165 students and it had passed academic accountability markers in 2013–2014. Jessica Sanchez was the superintendent at that point. The TEA announced in 2014 that it the school was to automatically lose its charter because it failed financial accountability measures for the third time.
- Higgs Carter King Gifted & Talented Charter Academy - In 2014 the school was to automatically lose its charter under TEA rules.
- San Antonio Preparatory Academy - In 2014 the school was to automatically lose its charter under TEA rules.

By 2012 philanthropic organizations made efforts to expand the use of charter schools in the city, and these efforts continued into 2015. In 2018 the city government allowed IDEA Public Schools to issue tax-exempt bonds, which are less expensive than the kinds of bonds it could previously issue. San Antonio-area public school districts protested the move, stated that this would cause charter schools to cannibalize them. In 2019 IDEA announced plans to expand in the San Antonio area after the United States Department of Education issued it a $116 million grant.

== Private schools ==
San Antonio has many private schools, including:

- Central Catholic Marianist High School
- Antonian College Preparatory High School
- The Atonement Catholic Academy
- Carver Academy
- Castle Hills First Baptist School
- Christian Academy of San Antonio (CASA)
- The Circle School
- The Clowvazar Academy
- Cornerstone Christian School
- Concordia Lutheran School
- Destiny Christian Schools
- Gateway Christian School
- Harvest Academy
- Holy Cross High School
- Holy Spirit Catholic School
- Incarnate Word High School
- Keystone School
- Eleanor Kolitz Academy
- Lutheran High School of San Antonio
- New Life Christian Academy
- Providence High School
- Rainbow Hills Baptist School
- River City Christian School
- Rolling Hills Catholic School
- Saint Mary's Hall
- Saint Pius X Catholic School
- San Antonio Academy
- San Antonio Christian School
- San Antonio Country Day Montessori School
- Sendero Christian Academy
- St. Anthony Catholic High School
- St. John Bosco School
- St. Matthew Catholic School
- St. Mary's Hall
- St. Monica Catholic School
- St. Paul Catholic School
- St. Gerard Catholic High School
- St. Luke Catholic School
- The Montessori School of San Antonio
- T.M.I.: The Episcopal School of Texas
- Trinity Christian School
- The Winston School of San Antonio
- Village Parkway Christian School
- St. Lukes Episcopal School
- South Texas Vocational Technical Institute
- St. Thomas More Catholic School
- The Winston School San Antonio

== Miscellaneous education ==
The Japanese Supplementary School of San Antonio (JSSSA; サンアントニオ日本語補習校 San Antonio Nihongo Hoshūkō), a Japanese weekend supplementary school holding classes for Japanese Americans and Japanese nationals, holds its classes at Raba Elementary School in San Antonio.
