= NLC =

NLC may refer to:

== Places ==
- Naliya Cantt, the station code for a railway station in Northern India
- New London (Amtrak station), Connecticut, United States; Amtrak station code NLC.

=== Fictional locations ===
- "New Leaf City", a part of the MMORPG MapleStory.

== Schools ==
- North Lake College, a Dallas County Community College.
- Northeast Lakeview College, a community college and member college of the Alamo Colleges in the San Antonio, Texas metropolitan area.
- Northwest Lineman College

== Companies, organizations, departments ==
- The National Labor Committee, an American NGO working for sweatshop labor reform in Asia and Central/South America
- National Leadership Conference, the largest conference of the year of FBLA-PBL
- National League of Cities, an advocacy organization in the United States representing 19,495 cities
- National Liaison Committee for International Students in Australia
- National Liberal Club, a London gentlemen's club
- National Liberation Council, the government in Ghana from 1966 to 1969
- National Library of China, the national library in Beijing
- National Logistics Corporation, Pakistani logistics company
- National Lottery Commission, a non departmental public body which regulates and licenses the UK National Lottery
- National Lutheran Council, a former association of Lutheran churches in the United States
- Ndola Lime Company Limited, a Zambian company
- Nebraska Library Commission
- Newfoundland and Labrador Liquor Corporation
- Neo-Luciferian Church
- New Leaders Council Leading progressive leadership training institute in North America
- New Line Cinema film studio
- Neyveli Lignite Corporation, a lignite mining and power generating company in India
- Nigeria Labour Congress
- Northern Land Council, an Aboriginal organisation in the Northern Territory of Australia
- North Lanarkshire Council, a local government body in Scotland

== Other uses ==
- National League Central, a division in Major League Baseball
- National Location Code, a numerical code assigned to revenue-generating locations on the British railway network for accounting and ticket-issuing purposes
- Natural language and computation
- Nematic Liquid Crystal
- Newton's Law of Cooling
- Next Level Chef (American TV series)
- Next Linear Collider
- Noctilucent cloud, rare bright cloudlike atmospheric phenomena visible in a deep twilight
- Numerical Library Collection, a collection of mathematical libraries that supports the development of numerical simulation programs by NEC
- Nurse Licensure Compact, a multi-state agreement allowing some nurses in the United States to practice outside of their home state
- Nutrition and Lifestyle Coach

== See also ==
- NLCS (disambiguation)
