= Texas Normal College =

Texas Normal College is the former name of several institutions of higher education in the state of Texas, including:

- East Texas Normal College and East Texas State Normal College, former names of what is now East Texas A&M University
- Texas Normal College and Teacher Training Institute, now known as the University of North Texas
- West Texas State Normal College, now known as West Texas A&M University

== See also ==
- List of colleges and universities in Texas
