= Texas Wesleyan College =

Texas Wesleyan College may refer to:

- Fort Worth University, defunct university formerly named "Texas Wesleyan College" 1881–1889
- Texas Wesleyan University, formerly named "Texas Wesleyan College" 1934–1989

== See also ==
- List of colleges and universities in Texas
