= Pre-kindergarten =

School program for children before kindergarten

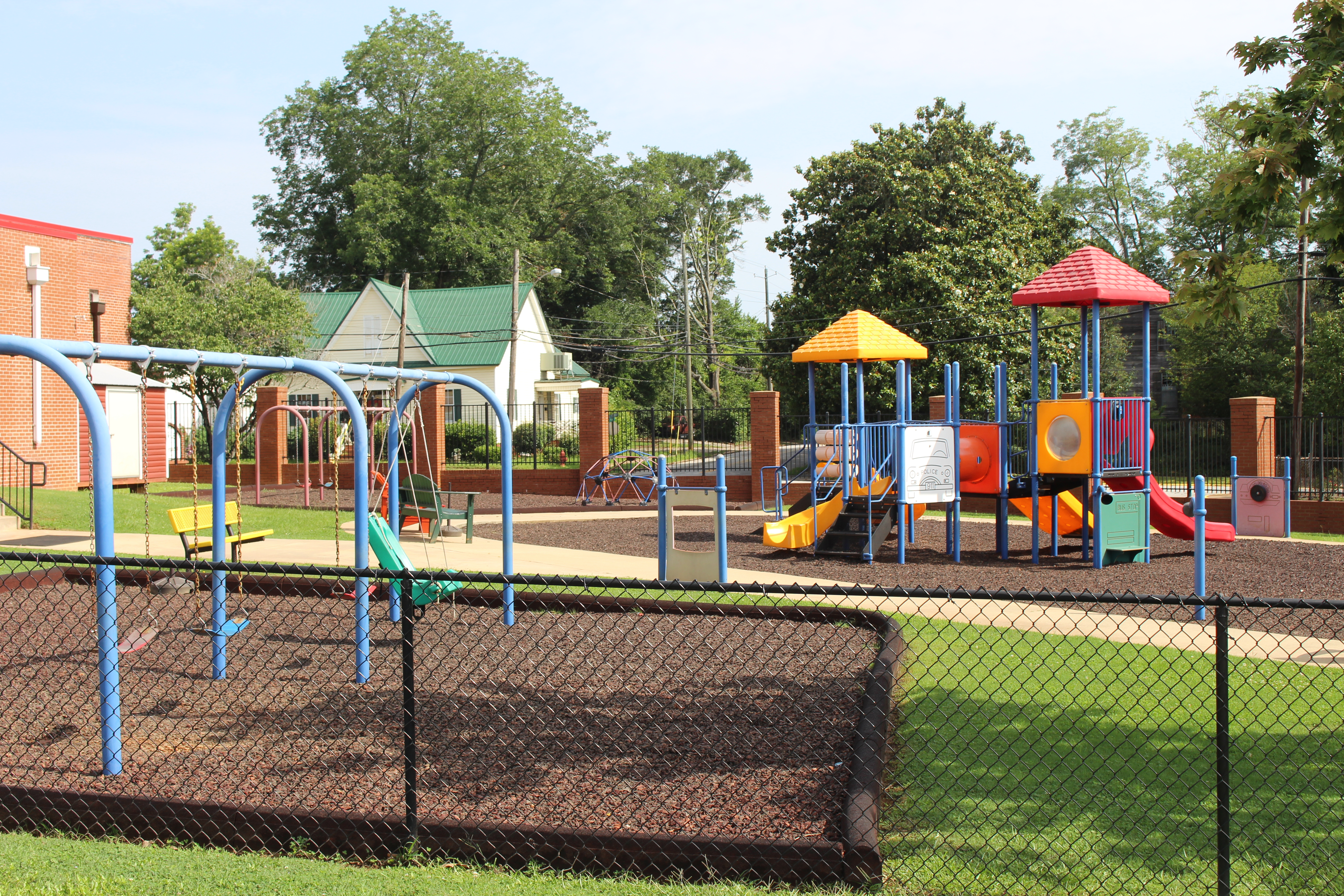
A pre-kindergarten playground

Pre-kindergarten (also called pre-K or PK) is a voluntary classroom-based preschool program for children below the age of five in the United States, Canada, Turkey and Greece (when kindergarten starts). It may be delivered through a preschool or within a reception year in elementary school. Pre-kindergartens play an important role in early childhood education. They have existed in the US since 1922, normally run by private organizations. The U.S. Head Start program, the country's first federally funded pre-kindergarten program, was founded in 1967. This attempts to prepare children (especially disadvantaged children) to succeed in school.

== United States ==
As of 2016–17, 44 states, plus the District of Columbia, provide at least some state funding for pre-K programs. Nine states (Colorado, Iowa, Kentucky, Maine, Oklahoma, Texas, Vermont, West Virginia, and Wisconsin) plus D.C. include pre-K funding in their school funding formulas. Conversely, as of 2016–17, six states (Idaho, Montana, New Hampshire, South Dakota, North Dakota, and Wyoming) provide no state funding for pre-K.

In 2013, Alabama, Michigan, Minnesota, and the city of San Antonio, Texas, enacted or expanded pre-K programs. In New York City, Mayor Bill de Blasio was elected on a pledge of pre-K for all city children. A poll conducted in 2014 for an early education nonprofit advocate found that 60 percent of registered Republicans and 84 percent of Democrats supported expanding public preschool by raising the federal tobacco tax.

Funding for pre-K has proven a substantial obstacle for creating and expanding programs. The issue produced multiple approaches. Several governors and mayors targeted existing budgets. San Antonio increased sales taxes, while Virginia and Maine look to gambling. In Oregon, currently 20% of kids have access to publicly funded pre-K of any kind, and a 2016 campaign is working to fully fund pre-K to 12 education, for all kids whose parents want them to have the option of pre-K.

A 2012 review by the National Institute for Early Education Research at Rutgers University identified Oklahoma, Georgia and West Virginia as among the leaders in public program quality and fraction of enrolled children. Florida had the highest enrollment in 2012—almost four-fifths of all four-year-olds. About 84 percent were in private, religion-based or family centers. That state's preschool programs did not fare well on quality measures. Other states with more than 50 percent enrollment included Wisconsin, Iowa, Texas and Vermont.

In 2002, Florida voters enacted a state constitutional amendment requiring that the state establish a free voluntary pre-kindergarten (VPK) program for all four-year-old children by fall 2005. Florida's program is the largest state-level preschool program in the nation. It is universal, meaning that all children are eligible so long as they meet the age and residency requirement. In the 2013-14 school year, 80% of VPK programs were housed at private centers, 18% were housed at public schools, 1% were housed at family daycares, and 1% were housed at private schools. The program resulted in an increase in pre-k participation, which was about 80% in 2014. The program has suffered a decline in funding; in 2019, the Orlando Sentinel editorial board wrote that the Florida Legislature "has neglected the pre-K program almost since it was approved by voters."

== Impact ==
According to a 2024 review published in Science, research on the effectiveness of pre-K programs have had mixed results. While some studies purported to show positive results, these were based upon non-random-assignment methods and are limited. Lottery based studies have generally found pre-K programs had null results.

A randomized control found that children randomly assigned to undertake full-day pre-K had substantially greater outcomes in cognition, literacy, math, and physical development, at the end of pre-K, than their peers who were randomly assigned to undertake half-day pre-K. A longitudinal randomized control study of 2,990 low-income children in Tennessee found that "children randomly assigned to attend pre-K had lower state achievement test scores in third through sixth grades than control children, with the strongest negative effects in sixth grade. A negative effect was also found for disciplinary infractions, attendance, and receipt of special education services, with null effects on retention."

The Perry Preschool Project was a study on the impact of pre-kindergarten programs on outcomes for disadvantaged youth. The availability of high-quality pre-kindergarten education was found to have a statistically significant association with higher high school graduation rates, lower crime rates, lower teen pregnancy rates, and better economic outcomes in adulthood.

== Children of immigrants ==
The US Census Bureau forecast that the foreign-born population in the United States would make up 19% of the US population by 2060 (up from 13% in 2014). Children of immigrant families face special challenges.

=== Cultural values and childcare options ===
Children of immigrants represent the fastest growing US population. Asians and Latinos are the two largest racial groups. Like all families, immigrants have choices when pursuing childcare options. Cultural differences shape childcare choices, such as attitudes towards early academic development. These differences help explain certain irregular childcare options. Compared to Latino immigrant groups, Asians are more likely than Latinos to enroll their children in pre-kindergarten programs due to the inclusion of academics. The focus of pre-academic school readiness is important to Asian parents. Latino immigrant parents generally opt for more informal childcare options, such as parental, relative or non-relative in-home care. This is due in part to the opinion that academic skills are to be taught through formal instruction after children enter primary school. While Latino families value the acquisition of academic skills, the in-home childcare choice reflects the importance of cultural and linguistic values and traditional family dynamics. Parents with limited English proficiency are more likely to choose parental or in-home care instead of pre-kindergarten programs.

=== Barriers ===
According to information from the Survey of Income and Program Participation (SIPP) and the National Institute of Child Health and Human Development (NICHD), low-income immigrant families are less likely to use center-based childcare, such as pre-kindergarten, than children of non-immigrants. While some Latino families prefer in-home childcare, many report wanting to enroll their children in a pre-kindergarten program. Interviews with immigrant mothers revealed common motivations for seeking pre-kindergarten placements for their children, including maternal employment, opportunity to learn English and social and emotional development. Obstacles immigrant mothers reported facing included high cost, long wait-lists, a need to provide documentation (especially for illegal aliens and those who lacked English-language proficiency) and a lack of information regarding eligibility for subsidized programs. On average, immigrants tend to experience higher poverty rates due to low wages, less education and a lack of English proficiency.

=== Benefits ===
While many children benefit from pre-kindergarten and early childhood education, immigrant children, particularly those from lower socio-economic households, stand to benefit the most. Studies show that first and second-generation immigrants lag behind children of non-immigrant families in cognitive and language skills. Pre-K's focus on cognitive, social, emotional and physical development would address these skills and reduce the inequalities in school readiness between children from immigrant and non-immigrant families. Educators must be sensitive to sensitivities of immigrant groups regarding the acquisition of the English language versus their native-language. Pre-K could help children build either or both skills. For most US students, English fluency is essential.

== See also ==
- Balwadi
- Forest kindergarten
- Transitional kindergarten
- Pre-school playgroup—a related type of establishment found in the United Kingdom
