= NCL =

NCL may refer to:

== Places ==
- New Caledonia, French territory in the Pacific

== Organizations ==
- National Carriers Limited, a former British road haulage company subsequently merged into Lynx Express
- National Central Library (Taiwan), national library of Taiwan
- National Central Library (various other libraries)
- National Chemical Laboratory, Pune, India
- National Consumers League, US
- Newcastle University
- Nintendo Company Limited, Japanese video game company
- Northern Coalfields, Indian coal company

== Science ==
- Native chemical ligation, a chemical way to synthesize proteins
- Neuronal ceroid lipofuscinosis, neurodegenerative disorders
- nidopallium caudolaterale, part of the birdbrain's nidopallium
- Nucleolin, a protein
- Nested Context Language
- NCAR Command Language
- NULL convention logic, a form of asynchronous logic

== Sports ==
- National Conference League, a rugby league in the UK
- National Cricket League, Bangladesh
- North Coast League, a high school athletic conference in Ohio

== Transport ==
- Newcastle International Airport, England
- Newcastle railway station, England
- North Coast railway line, Queensland, Australia
- North Coast railway line, New South Wales, Australia
- National City Lines, American transportation company
- Northern City Line, railway line in London
- Norwegian Cruise Line, a cruise ship company

== See also ==
- NCLS (disambiguation)
