= NCLS =

NCLS may refer to:

- National Church Life Survey, Australia
- Neuronal Ceroid Lipofuscinoses (NCLs), a group of neurodegenerative lysosomal storage disorders
- Newton County Library System, Newton County, Georgia, U.S.

== See also ==
- NCL (disambiguation)
- NLCS (disambiguation)
