= Artemisia Bowden =

American activist (1879–1969)

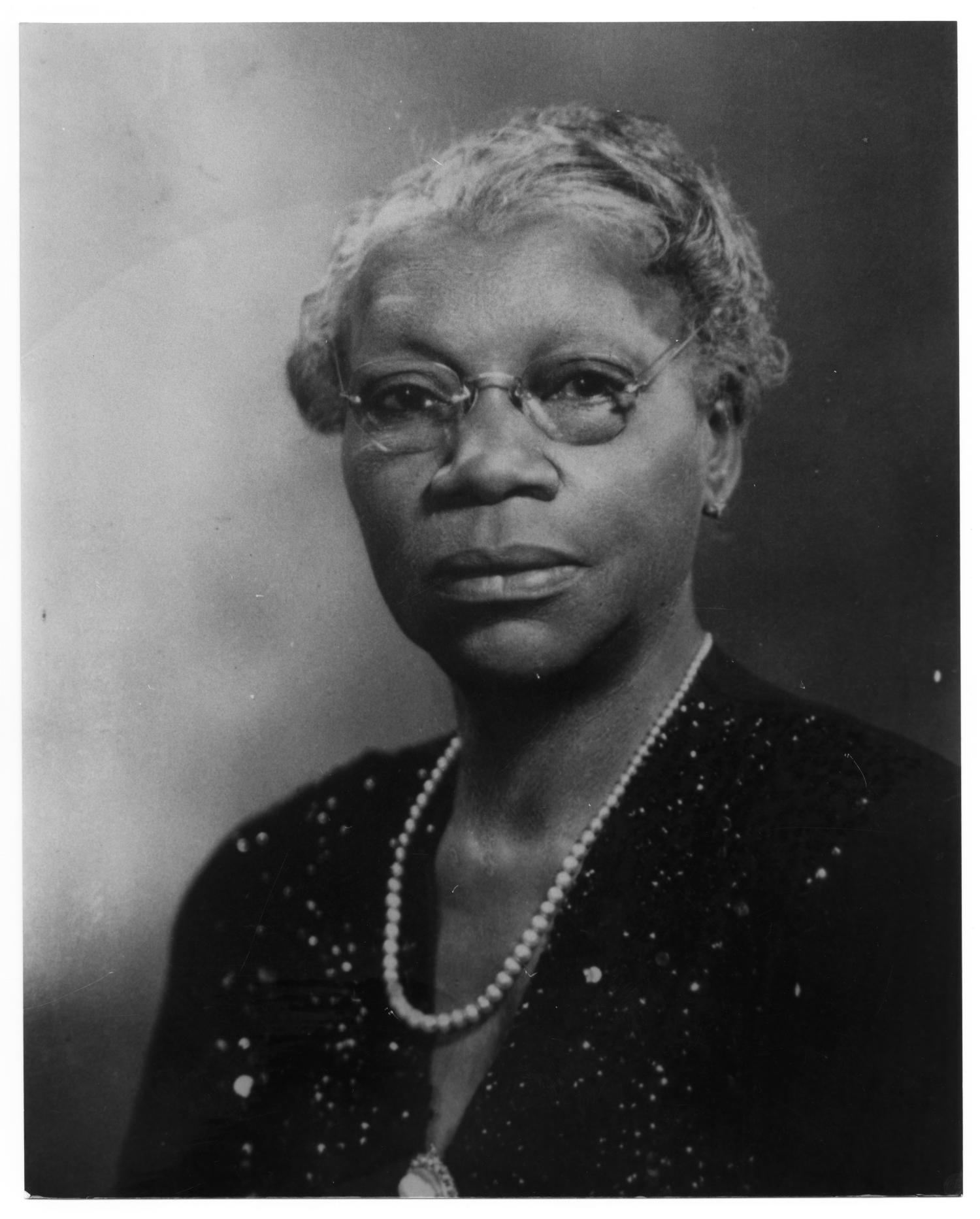
Artemisia Bowden, first President and Dean of St. Philip's College

Artemisia Bowden (January 1, 1879 – August 18, 1969) was an American school administrator and civil rights activist. She is most notable for her role in the founding and operation of St. Philip's College in San Antonio, Texas.

== Early life ==
Artemisia Bowden was born in Albany, Georgia to former slaves Milas and Mary Bowden. In her early life, Artemisia Bowden grew up in Brunswick, Georgia. There she attended Athanasius’ parish school, as her father was an active member of St. Athanasius Episcopal Methodist Church. Bowden later attended St. Augustine's Normal School in Raleigh, North Carolina, where she graduated in 1900.

== Personal life ==
Bowden was the oldest of four children. When she was young, she was taught how to cook, sew, and play the piano. She never married but was known to be married to her school and civic duty. She was also known for her confidence. “Miss Esdale Malloy...described her ‘as a person of supreme confidence, one who felt she could overcome any obstacle". Bowden spent much of her life fighting for equal education and rights for African Americans. A few examples of her roles in civic programs were “the introduction of a black nursing unit in Robert E. Green Hospital, for securing Lindbergh Park for black residents, and for establishing the East Side Settlement House.” In 1935 she received her bachelor's degree at St. Augustine's College and an honorary degree from Wiley College for her efforts and accomplishments in Texas.

== Career ==
After graduating from St. Augustine's Normal School in Raleigh in 1900, she became an educator at St. Joseph's Parochial School in Fayetteville, North Carolina. After a year of teaching at St. Joseph's Parochial School she accepted another position at High Point Normal and Industrial School in High Point, North Carolina. Bowden continued teaching at High Point for one more year, during which time she received another opportunity.

Bishop James Johnston began a search for a qualified individual to take the position of chief administrator and primary teacher at St. Philip's Normal and Industrial School in San Antonio, Texas. Bowden accepted the position and arrived in 1902, and as principal, Bowden made many changes to St. Philip's Day School. Under her administration she divided the departments into a primary and secondary grammar school and a vocational school. In the vocational program Bowden focused on teaching young women reading, writing, algebra, history, botany, sewing and cooking, and other homemaking skills. In 1907 there was an integration of vocational and industrial skills in public schools and because the tuition at St. Philip's was high for the times, St. Philip's saw a decrease in the number of students enrolled. Bowden sought out students from outside of San Antonio and also added a Normal Department to prepare elementary school teachers, and by 1908 low enrollment was no longer an issue. In 1917 she helped move the school to its most current location on the San Antonio East Side.

In 1926, Artemisia Bowden set out to help the school achieve the next level in higher education for her school, junior college status. She fundraised for her school and with the support of the American Church Institute for Negroes the school was able to obtain "a new main building, which included classrooms, space for boarding students, a gym, music rooms, a dining hall, a handicraft room and a library." In September 1927, St. Philip's Junior College opened. During the Great Depression, in 1934, the Episcopal Church and Diocese of West Texas renounced the fiscal responsibilities of St. Philips leaving Bowden with an impending foreclosure and lost assets. Bowden looked to friends, family, and her community for financial assistance. When her father died, she used $1,000 out of the $2,000 inheritance she received for school obligations such as school supplies and teacher salaries. She also began a campaign to have the San Antonio School Board assume fiscal responsibilities but was rejected several times. On September 15, 1942 St. Philip's Junior College was accepted by the San Antonio School Board as the first junior black college governed by a city school board and Artemisia Bowden became its Vice President. In 1954, after 52 years of service Artemisia Bowden retired with the title Dean Emeritus.

== Legacy ==
Artemisia Bowden died on August 18, 1969, in San Antonio. She was cremated and interred in Corpus Christi, Texas. Bowden is recognized not only for her contributions to the success of St. Philip's College, but also for her leadership and success in civic and welfare projects for African Americans in greater San Antonio.

Bowden received an honorary degree from both Wiley College in 1935 and Tillotson College in 1952 for her civic work. She served as president of the San Antonio Metropolitan Council of Negro Women, founded and served as president of the Negro Business and Professional Women's Club and founded the Bowden Chapter of Business and Professional Women.” In 1955 Zeta Phi Beta sorority named her woman of the year. The National Council of Negro Women awarded Bowden as "one of the ten most outstanding women educators in the United States."

Artemisia Bowden's legacy lives on today and is honored by San Antonio Independent School District's Bowden Academy, the Saint Artemisia Bowden Center of Excellence at St. Philip's College, the Bowden Legacy Building at St. Philip's College, and the University of Incarnate Word's Bowden Eye Care and Health Center. In 2015, she was elevated to sainthood in the Episcopal Church with August 18 as her Feast Day. She was named President Emeritus by Alamo Colleges District.
