= NLCS (disambiguation) =

NLCS most commonly in the United States refers to the National League Championship Series in Major League Baseball.

NLCS may also refer to:

- North London Collegiate School, a girls' school in North London
- The National Landscape Conservation System, a system of protected lands managed by the Bureau of Land Management
- The Northern Lights Community School, a charter school in Warba, Minnesota

== See also ==
- NLC (disambiguation)
- NCLS (disambiguation)
