= College of Health Care Professions =

Private for-profit school in Texas, US

Coordinates: 29.8081°N 95.4445°W

The College of Health Care Professions (CHCP)
- Former name: The Academy of Health Care Professions
- Type: Private, for-profit
- Established: 1988
- Location: Houston, Texas, United States
- Campus: 7 campuses throughout the state
- Website: www.chcp.edu

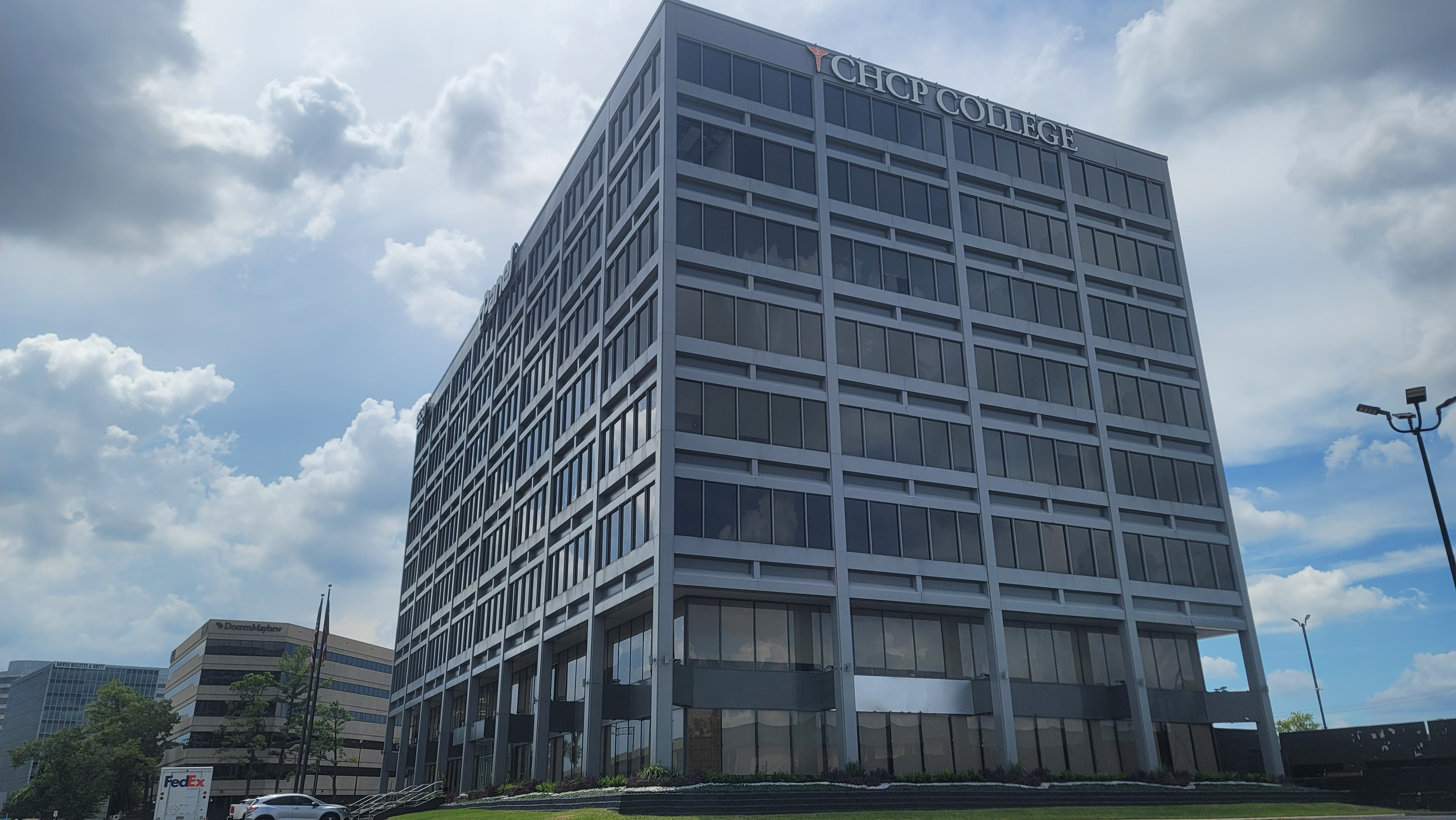
2500 North Loop West

The College of Health Care Professions (CHCP) is a private for-profit school of allied health professions with its headquarters in Houston, Texas, and multiple campuses throughout the state.

== History ==
In 1988, the physicians of MacGregor Medical Association, a physician’s practice affiliated with Texas Medical Center, founded the Academy of Health Care Professions. Its purpose was to provide quality training of allied health staff in-house, to support MacGregor’s growth. In 1990, the academy was approved by the Texas Workforce Commission to provide allied health education and training. In 2012, the Academy of Health Care Professions was renamed The College of Health Care Professions (CHCP).

== Accreditation ==
CHCP is accredited by the Accrediting Bureau of Health Education Schools (ABHES).
