= National Central Library =

National Central Library may refer to:

- Biblioteca Nazionale Centrale di Roma (Central National Library of Rome)
- National Central Library (England and Wales)
- National Central Library (Florence)
- National Central Library (Taiwan)

== See also ==
- National library
