= MediaTech Institute =

American technical school specializing in media

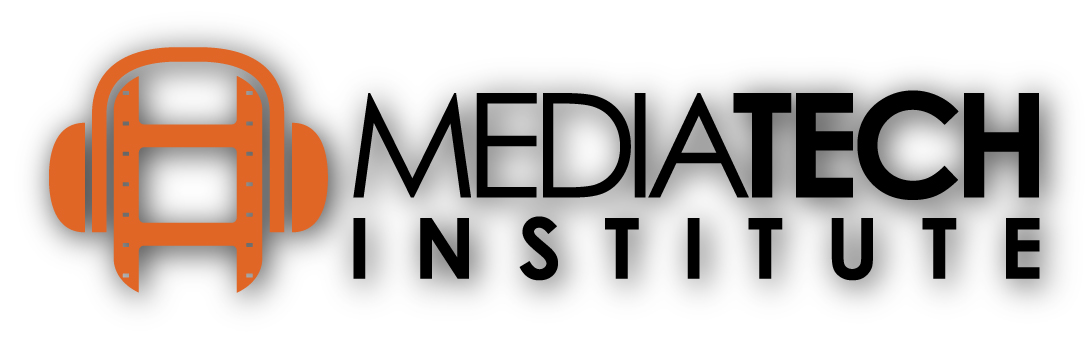
- Former names: Dallas Sound Lab; Austin Sound Lab
- Type: For-profit technical school
- Established: 1999
- Location: 32.9245°N 96.9028°W
- Campus: Dallas; Houston
- Website: mediatech.edu

MediaTech Institute for Creative Arts (MediaTech) is a for-profit technical school specializing in media production with two locations in Texas. In 1999, the school was founded as Dallas Sound Lab’s audio engineering program. MediaTech Institute was established in 2003 when the Dallas and Austin Sound Labs acquired an additional location in Houston. MediaTech has schools in Houston and Dallas.

MediaTech is nationally accredited by the Accrediting Commission of Career Schools and Colleges. MediaTech participates in federal Title IV funding and Stafford loans.

== History ==
Russell Whitaker, the founder and President of MediaTech Institute, is a 25-year veteran of the media industry. Whitaker has worked with artists such as Destiny’s Child, The Imperials, Paula Abdul, ZZ Top, Phil Collins, Toby Keith, Cheap Trick and Stevie Ray Vaughan as well as on films and televisions shows such as “Titanic”, “Tarzan and the Lost City”, and “Robocop.” Whitaker designed Ruff Cedar Recording Studio Austin in 1975 and relocated to Dallas where he founded Dallas Sound Lab at the Dallas Communications Complex in 1980. In 1999, Whitaker created Dallas Sound Lab’s audio engineering program.

In 2003, the program changed its name to MediaTech Institute and opened a branch in Houston within the Sunrise Sound studios. MediaTech gained its accreditation through the Accrediting Commission of Career Schools and Colleges in 2005 and the accreditation was granted again in 2010. MediaTech received approval from the United States Government to offer financial aid through Title IV funding in 2008.

== Schools ==
The original location in Dallas houses seven professional studios.

MediaTech’s Houston location has three studios. Studio A has a solid state logic SSL G+ mixing console with more than 152 channels, studio B was designed for vocal and instrument overdubbing, and studio C was designed with pre-production in mind. The Houston campus is laid out in specialized rooms named after colors. The Grey Room is designed for recording with a full band, the Gold Room has a full digital setup, the Green Room has a small booth for recording, the Purple Room houses a Control 24 console, and the Velvet Room is set up like a home studio.

== Academics ==
MediaTech has accreditation through the Accrediting Commission of Career Schools and Colleges and participates in federal Title IV funding and Stafford loans. MediaTech Institute limits its technical courses to 12 students at a time. MediaTech has enrollment four times a year and can serve 150 students. Its graduation rate is around 80 percent.

Courses fall under six main programs of study including web design and development, recording arts, digital film and video, mobile app development, and animated visual effects.

The web design and development program is a year-long program offered at the Dallas campus. All campuses offer the recording arts program which is a 45-week diploma program covering all aspects of the radio industry, including audio engineering and studio techniques, mixing mastering and post production, producing and songwriting, live sound reinforcement, and business of music courses. Completion of the program also comes with a Pro Tools certification.

The digital film and video program covers production from script to screen including camera operation, directing, producing, lighting, gripping, editing, visual effects, budgeting, and distribution. 45-week programs are offered at the Dallas campus. Dallas features sound studios. The mobile application development program focuses on mobile app design. MediaTech’s one year degree program in mobile app development teaches HTML, CSS, Java, and Objective-C. The school also offers an introduction to JavaScript and PHP. Over the course of the program, students are also taught the development process for both iOS and Android devices.

The school’s year long animation program is based in Dallas and aims to prepare students for a job in the visual effects field. Concepts taught in the program include character rigging, 3d modeling, visual storytelling, rendering, and cinematography.

MediaTech offers 12-week programs on audio-engineering and studio techniques, producing, song writing, audio for television and film, live sound reinforcement, show production, and business of music. The business of music program teaches the inner workings of entertainment such as publishing and contracts.
