= St. Philip's College (United States) =

Community college in San Antonio, Texas, U.S.

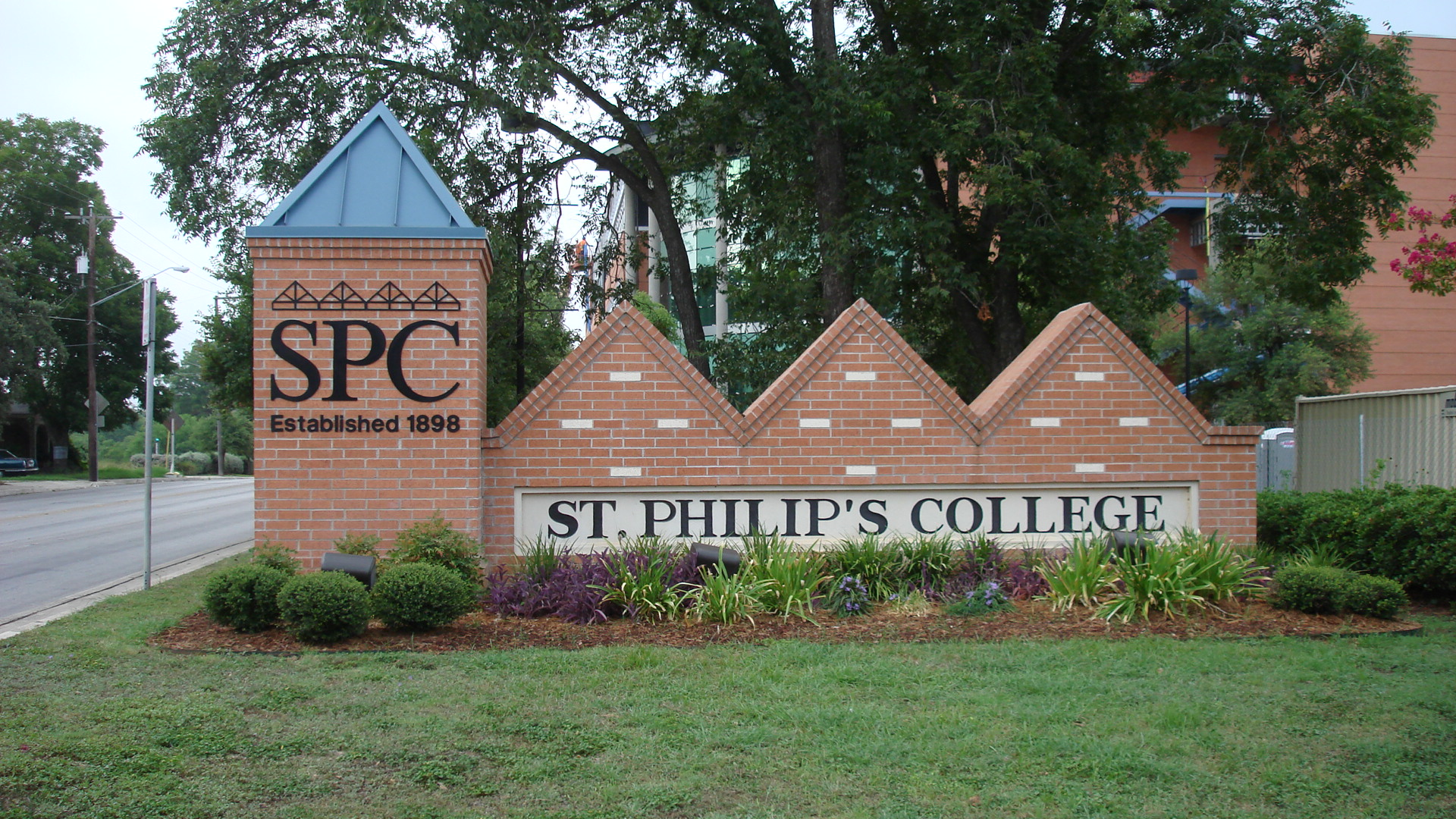
- Former names: St. Philip’s Normal and Industrial School; St. Philip’s Junior College
- Type: Public historically black community college
- Established: March 1, 1898
- Affiliations: Alamo Colleges District
- President: Adena Williams Loston
- Students: 14,281
- Location: San Antonio, Texas, United States; 29.416°N 98.454°W
- Nickname: Tigers
- Mascot: Phil the Tiger
- Website: www.alamo.edu/spc

St. Philip's College is a public historically black community college in San Antonio, Texas. It is accredited by the Southern Association of Colleges and Schools and part of the Alamo Colleges District. The college currently serves more than 21,000 students in over 70 different academic and technical disciplines. It is the westernmost historically black college or university in the United States and is located in the East Side, the historic home of the city's African American community.

== History ==
James Steptoe Johnston, the Second Bishop of West Texas for the Episcopal Church, founded St. Philip’s Normal and Industrial School to educate and train the daughters and granddaughters of emancipated slaves. Opening March 1, 1898, the school began as a weekend sewing class for six black girls, taught by Miss Alice G. Cowan, a missionary with the Episcopal Church.

In 1900, Mrs. Mary E. E. (Snowden) Walker, the daughter of John Baptist Snowden, came from Baltimore to serve as the school administrator. She left after two years.

In 1902, Artemisia Bowden, daughter of a former slave, joined the school as administrator and teacher. Miss Bowden served St. Philip’s for 52 years. Under her supervision, the school grew from an industrial school for girls into a high school and later, a junior college.

In 1942, the school, retaining the St. Philip’s Junior College name, affiliated with San Antonio College and the San Antonio Independent School District, marking the end of the college’s era as a private institution. This union resulted in what is known today as Alamo Colleges District.

== Campus ==
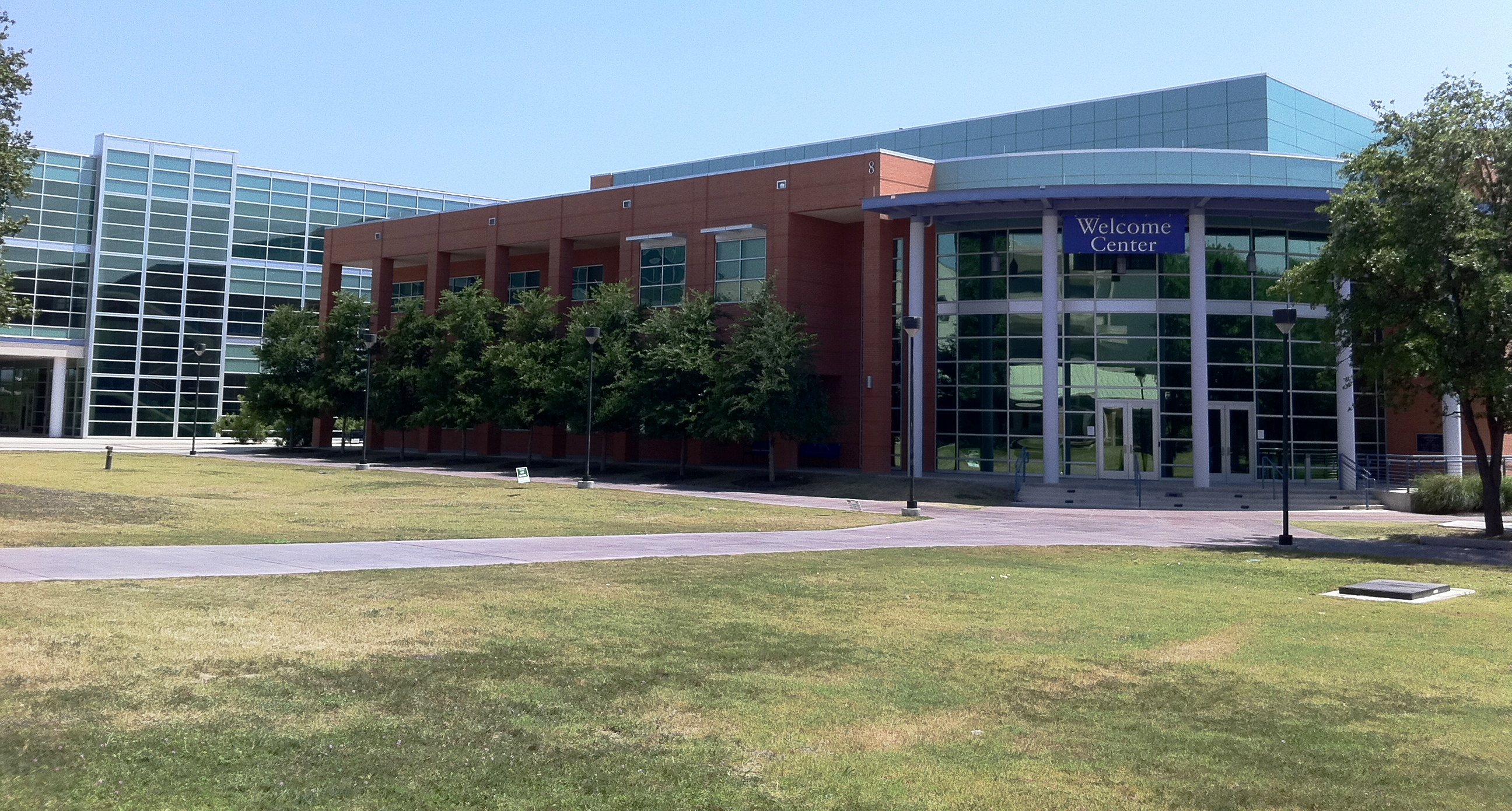

St. Philip's College operates two major campuses and several subsidiary locations. The main campus is located on the east side of San Antonio, three miles from Downtown. The Southwest Campus, formerly part of Kelly Air Force Base, is located on the southwest side of San Antonio and serves as a hub for technical training programs. Courses are also conducted at local military installations, hospitals, and high schools.

During the last 30 years, multimillion-dollar capital expansions added a state-of-the-art theater, an on-site cyber range, and a health sciences building to the main campus. The Southwest Campus recently added the Welding and Auto Collision Center, which resulted in a major expansion of program offerings.

The opening of the Northeast Learning Center (Converse, Texas) in 1996 resulted in the establishment of Northeast Lakeview College, a sister institution, and one of five colleges that make up the Alamo Colleges District. The Learning and Leadership Development Center, built in 1997 in collaboration with the City of San Antonio is undergoing renovations and will reopen in 2024. In 2009, SPC expanded to include a new multipurpose facility, library, and welcome center, and in 2018, the Good Samaritan Veterans Outreach and Transition Center, formerly an old hospital, opened on the same day as the renovated E.L. Turbon Student Center.

In 2022, the college opened four buildings during a one-day event—Saint Artemisia Bowden Center of Excellence; Tourism, Hospitality and Culinary Arts Center of Excellence; Clarence Windzell Norris Building; and William Allen Hudgins Health and Wellness Building.

== Academics ==
St. Philip’s College offers open admission. Admission requires completion of a student data form and submission of high school graduation transcript or GED certificate.

The college's academics are divided into three divisions: Arts and Sciences, Applied Science and Technology, and Health Professions. Students may earn an Associate of Arts, Associate of Science, Associate of Arts in Teaching, or Associate of Applied Science degree.
