= Palo Alto College =

Community college in San Antonio, Texas, U.S.

Coordinates: 29.325388°N 98.541358°W

- Type: Public community college
- Established: March 19, 1983
- President: Robert Garza
- Students: 9,368
- Location: San Antonio, Texas, United States
- Nickname: Palominos
- Website: Official website

Palo Alto College is a public community college in San Antonio, Texas. It is one of five separately accredited colleges in the Alamo Colleges District.

== History ==
Palo Alto College was first approved by ACCD Board of Trustees on February 21, 1983, and chartered by the Texas Legislature on March 19, 1983 - the official date of its founding. The college began with 231 students in high schools and military installations with administrative offices located at Billy Mitchell Village. As of 2007–2008, the college had 7,662 students enrolled. The college is set on nearly 126 acres (0.51 km^{2}) of land. Palo Alto College has over 100 staff members and full-time faculty members. PAC's original complex included 11 buildings and 26 classrooms.

== Academics ==
The new college attracted students from throughout Bexar County and adjoining counties. Increases in enrollment prompted physical growth, specifically through the construction of new facilities for added classroom space as well as sports and recreation.

The college also provides several programs in logistics and supply chain management education and training at the associate degree and certificate levels.

In Spring 2024, Palo Alto College started offering a Bachelor’s Degree in Operations Management.
