= Northwest Vista College =

Community college in San Antonio, Texas, US

Coordinates: 29.472°N 98.706°W

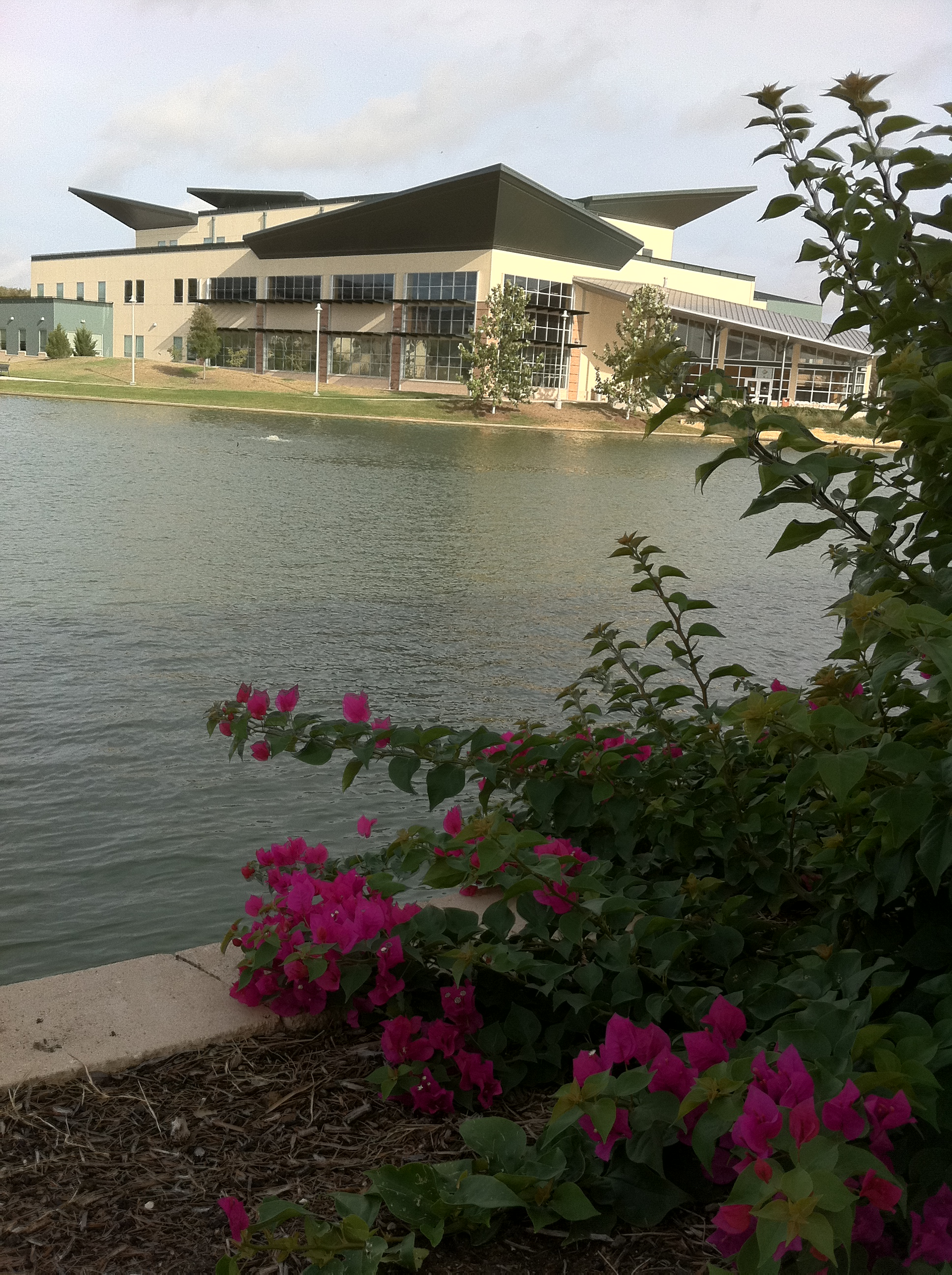
- Type: Public community college
- Established: June 20, 1995
- Affiliations: Alamo Colleges
- President: Amy Bosley
- Students: 15,526
- Location: San Antonio, Texas, United States
- Campus: Urban, 137 acres (0.6 km²)
- Colors: Purple
- Mascot: Wildcat
- Website: alamo.edu/nvc/

Northwest Vista College is a public community college in San Antonio, Texas. It is part of the Alamo Colleges District and is located in the Westover Hills neighborhood of San Antonio's Far West Side. Established in 1995 with a dozen students, Northwest Vista College has an enrollment of more than 18,000 students and offers associate degrees and technical certifications.

== History ==
The college was established after a land donation by the World Savings and Loan Association in 1994. The campus was established on June 20, 1995. Northwest Vista College officially opened in the fall of 1995 as one of the newest additions to the Alamo Community College District. Classes were offered at the Northside Independent School District and at partner corporation sites. Enrollment that first semester was 12 students. At the time, the Semiconductor Manufacturing Technology program, designed by the college and several corporate sponsors, was the lead program during the college's early years. (The program is no longer offered.) With over 800 students enrolled in classes being held at various businesses and schools in Westover Hills and the surrounding area during its early stages, the college started to expand.

The groundbreaking for the construction of the 137-acre (0.55 km^{2}) Northwest Vista College campus was held in November 1996. On July 3, 1997, the Alamo Community College Board awarded the $19,300,000 contract for the new Northwest Vista College Campus in Westover Hills. Construction began later that month on Phase One of the college's campus development plan, which included construction of four buildings.

Northwest Vista College moved to its current location in northwest San Antonio on October 17, 1998, with Mountain Laurel Hall as the first building open, and opened in October 1999 with the completion of Manzanillo Hall and Huisache Hall. Northwest Vista College had an enrollment of 2,500 students during their first full year of operation.

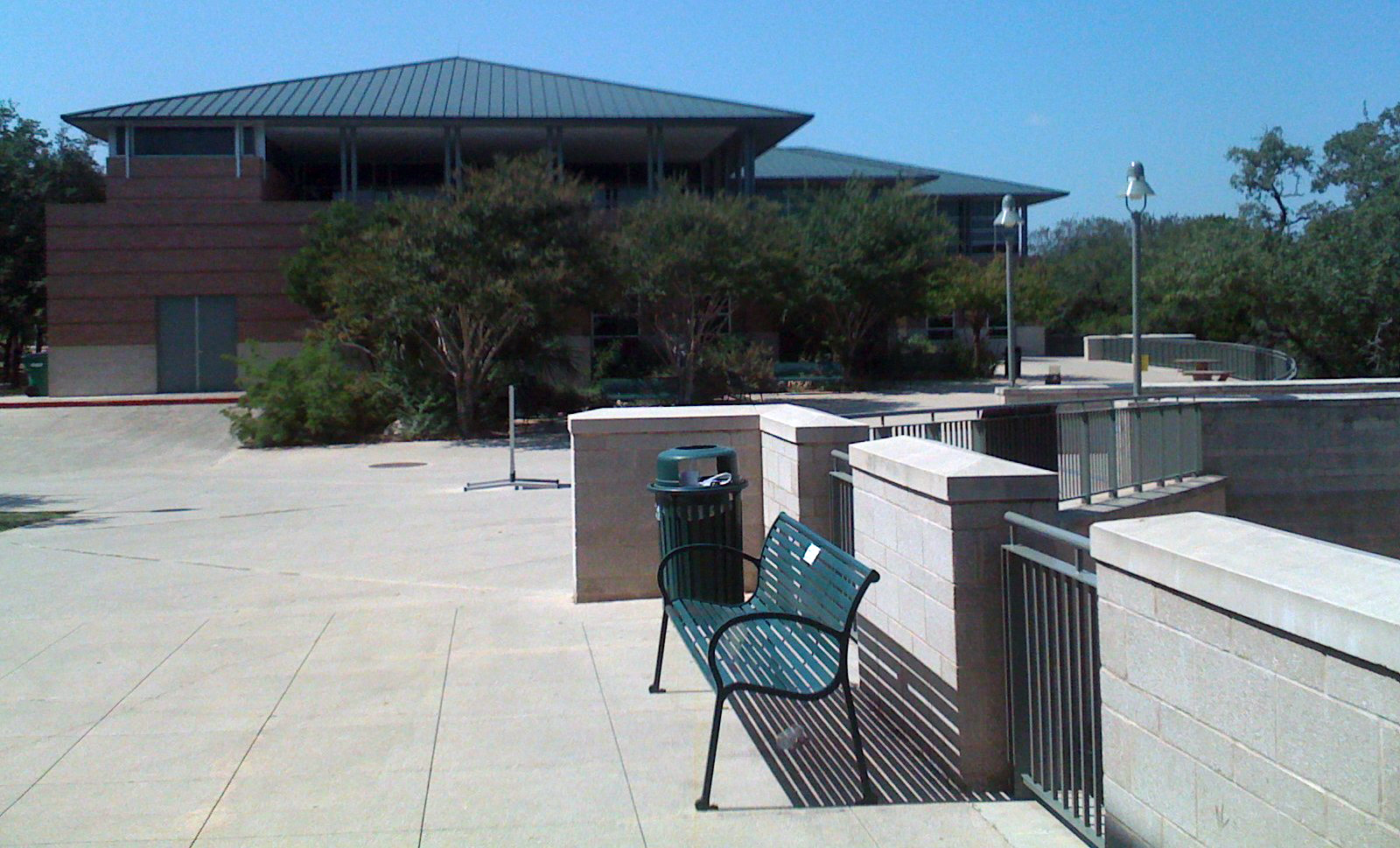
View Overlooking Manzanillo Hall

The college achieved Candidacy status for accreditation in June 1999 and in August of that year, began a rigorous self-study. At the completion of the self-study, a 12-member accreditation team visited the college in October 2000 for four days—reviewing documentation and interviewing faculty, staff, students, district personnel, community members and trustees of the Alamo Community College District. The committee made ten recommendations, to which the college had to submit a written response to the Southern Association of Colleges and Schools (SACS) by mid-April. This report was reviewed by the Commission on Colleges of the Southern Association of Colleges and Schools, which granted Northwest Vista College initial accreditation shortly afterwards.

At its meeting on June 21, 2001, SACS granted initial accreditation to Northwest Vista College. The accreditation is retroactive to January 1, 2001.

In November 2005, Bexar County voters approved a $450 million bond proposal to meet the needs of the Alamo Community College District's growing student enrollment. Northwest Vista College was allocated $106 million to address and support the extraordinary growth in the northwest area of San Antonio. The district's newly revised master plan included construction of seven new buildings and parking to accommodate over 14,000 students by 2010.

Two buildings were added in the fall of 2008. These were Juniper Hall and Redbud Learning Center. The buildings were accompanied by the newly built campus lake known as "Lago Vista." In the spring of 2009 two additional buildings were added to the lineup across the lake. The two new buildings, Live Oak Hall and Cypress Campus Center, were home to additional classrooms and a cafeteria.

In March 2009, the Alamo Community College District changed its name to specifically the "Alamo Colleges." This was done to enhance marketability. Due to the district name change as well as a new equality specific campaign, the logos of all the colleges in the district were changed. Northwest Vista College's logo was changed to the new district logo with a purple Alamo.

Currently, there are over 15,000 students taking courses at Northwest Vista College in a traditional daytime classroom setting as well as evening, Internet, hybrid and weekend courses.

NVC opened the Palmetto Center for the Arts in the fall of 2009 to house the campus fine arts disciplines.

== Academics ==
Students attending Northwest Vista can pursue a wide range of subjects. As a community college, NVC offers programs in Associate of Arts (AA), Associate of Science (AS), Associate of Arts in Teaching (AAT), Associate of Applied Science (AAS), Certificates of Completion, and Marketable Skills Awards.

Enrolled students also have the option to take courses that are transferable to many institutions of higher education. The college has several articulation agreements with the nearby universities such as the University of Texas at San Antonio, Texas State University–San Marcos, and the University of the Incarnate Word. These 2+2 articulation agreements serve to facilitate the admission and academic transfer of students from participating Community Colleges like NVC to a participating 4 year college or university within the state of Texas.

The current catalog of Northwest Vista College consists of a 46-hour core curriculum mandated by the Texas Higher Education Coordinating Board (THECB). The THECB requires that all public colleges and universities in Texas instill at least 42 hours of core curriculum studies into a student's degree plan. By completing NVC's core curriculum, students are allowed to transfer to any public institution in Texas without the worry of loss of credit in the transfer process. As long as the core curriculum is completed, the satisfying courses will transfer as a block and the student will not be required to take any more courses at the transfer institution unless the THECB has approved a larger core curriculum at that institution.

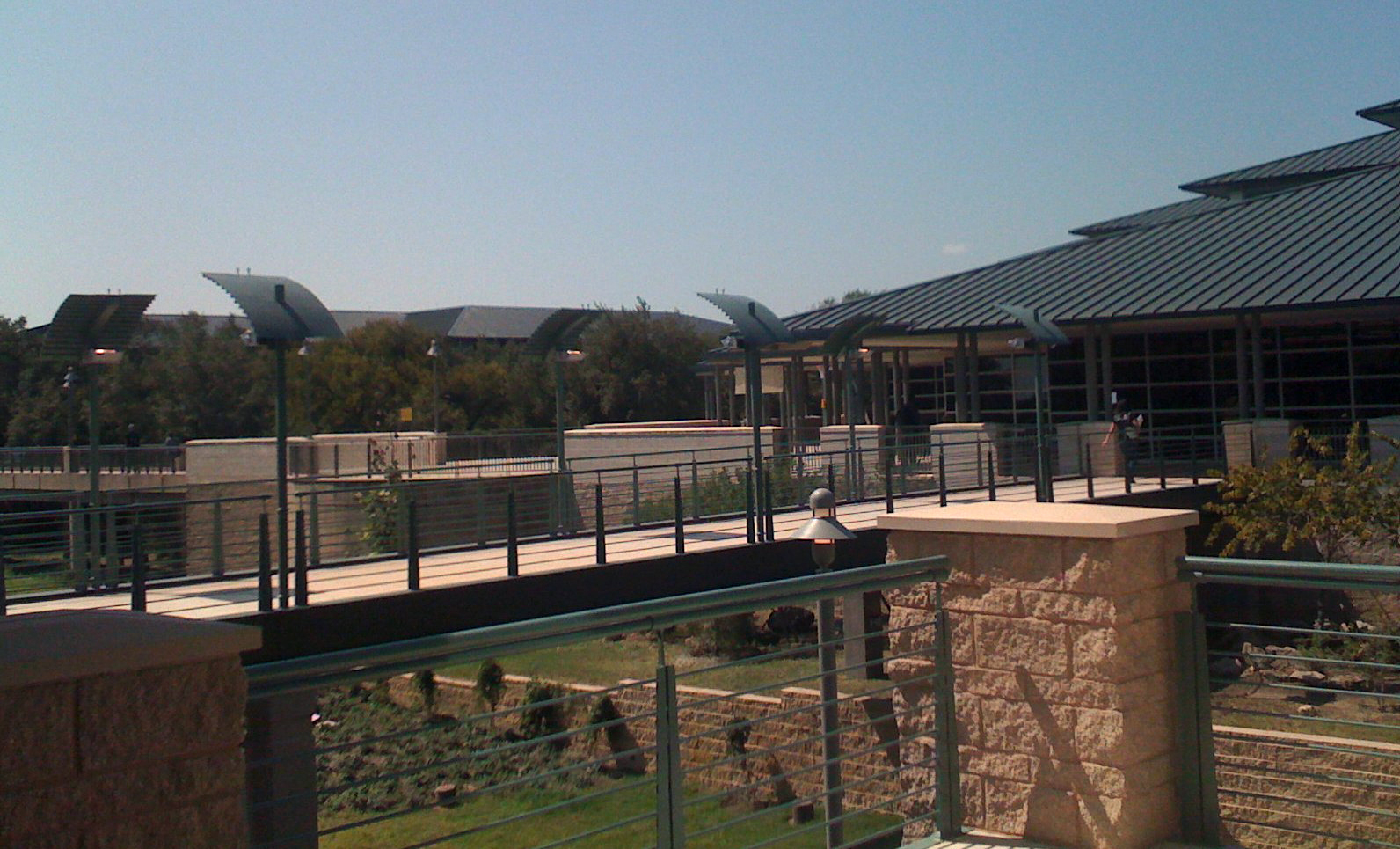
Bridge from Juniper Hall to Huisache Hall
