= Alamo Colleges District =

Network of colleges in Texas, US

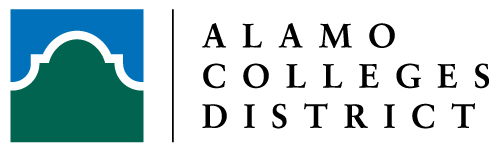
- Motto: Empowering our diverse communities for success.
- Type: Community College District
- Established: 1945 (as San Antonio Union Junior College District)
- Accreditation: SACS
- Chancellor: Mike Flores
- Students: 63,999 (Fall 2021)
- Location: San Antonio, Universal City, Kerrville, New Braunfels, Texas, United States; 29.4456°N 98.4741°W
- Campus: Urban
- Website: www.alamo.edu

The Alamo Colleges District (previously the Alamo Community College District (ACCD), and The Alamo Colleges) is a network of five community colleges in San Antonio and Universal City, Texas, and serving the Greater San Antonio metropolitan area. The district was founded in 1945 as the San Antonio Union Junior College District before adopting the Alamo name in 1982.

== Colleges in the district ==
The five colleges in the district operate with a high degree of autonomy, though the colleges' accrediting agency, the Southern Association of Colleges and Schools, placed three in a year-long warning period from January 2017 over issues of institutional autonomy. The board of trustees for the district voted to rename the district in January 2017 to reflect issues pertaining to accreditation.

- St. Philip's College (founded 1898)
- San Antonio College (founded 1925)
- Palo Alto College (founded 1983)
- Northwest Vista College (founded 1995)
- Northeast Lakeview College (founded 2007)

All of the colleges are within San Antonio city limits except Northeast Lakeview, which is within the town limits of Universal City and Live Oak, just to the northeast of the City of San Antonio. The Alamo Colleges District Main Office is located at 2222 N. Alamo St. and was previously located in multiple offices throughout the city and in a portion of Universal City.

== Education and programs ==
The district serves more than 100,000 students in academic and continuing-education programs and employs more than 6,000 faculty and staff. It had a budget of $503 million for the 2023 academic year.

The district offers over 300 degree and certificate programs. Most courses taken within the district are meant to apply to AA, AS, AAS, AAA, and AAT degrees, which help students apply for jobs or can be transferred to four-year institutions.

== Service area ==
As defined by the Texas Legislature, the official service area of the Alamo Colleges District is:

- all of Bandera, Bexar, Comal, Kendall, Kerr and Wilson Counties
- all of Atascosa County excluding the portion included within the Pleasanton Independent School District
- all of Guadalupe County excluding the portion of the county included within the San Marcos Consolidated Independent School District

== Awards ==
2018: Malcolm Baldrige National Quality Award in Education.

2024: Malcolm Baldrige National Quality Award in Education.
