= Northeast Lakeview College =

Community college in Universal City, Texas, US

Coordinates: 29°32′40.4″N 98°19′15.3″W

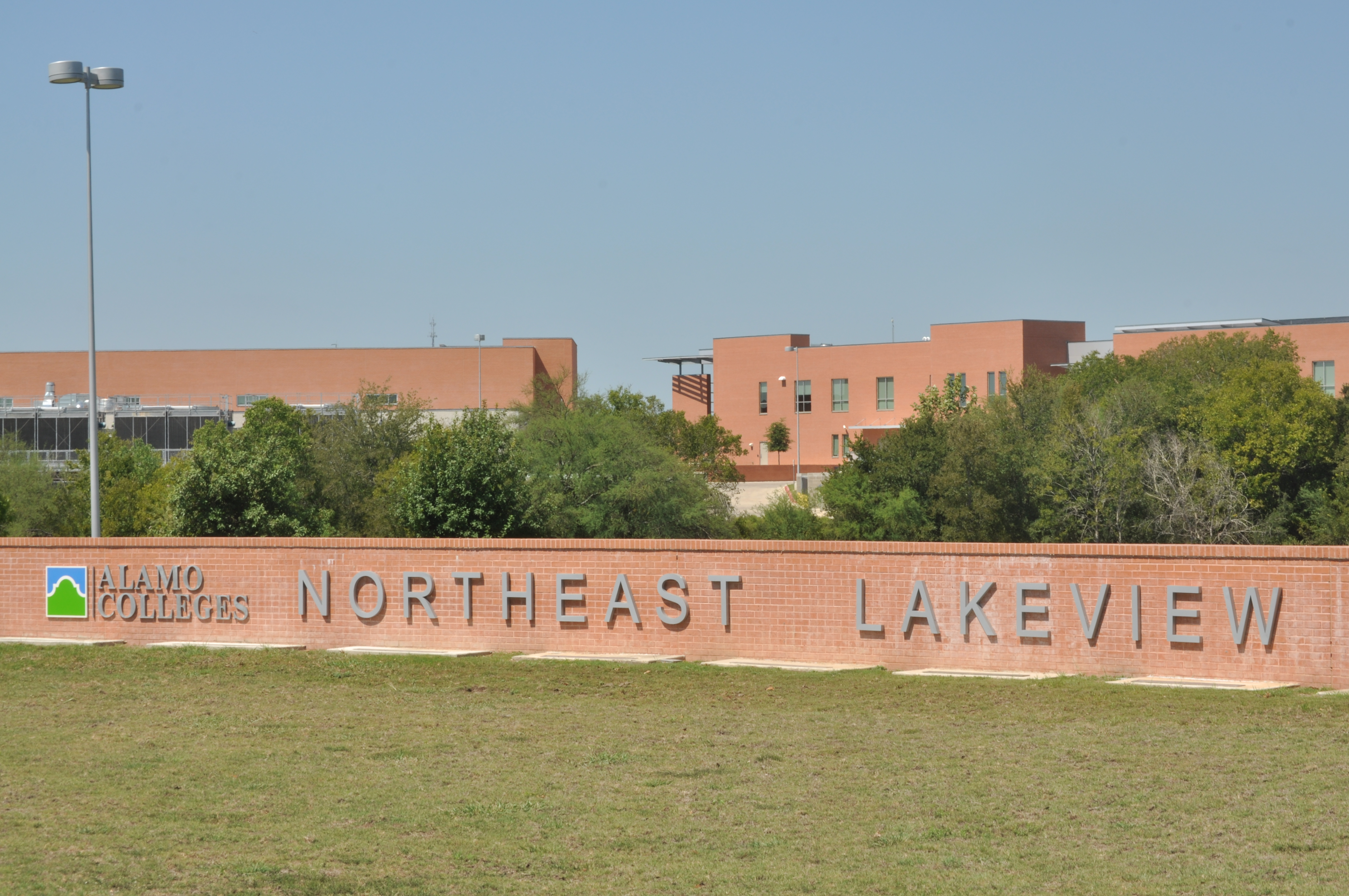
- Type: Public community college
- Established: 2007
- Affiliations: Alamo Colleges District
- President: Veronica Garcia
- Students: 6,704
- Location: Universal City, Texas, United States
- Campus: 267 acres (108 ha); Urban
- Colors: Green
- Website: www.alamo.edu/nlc/

Northeast Lakeview College (NLC) is a public community college in Universal City, Texas. It was named by Tony Gable. It is the newest of the five colleges in the Alamo Community College District. Its athletics teams compete as the Nighthawks and its mascot is Nico.

The college was established in 2007 after a successful $450 million bond election in November 2005. Classes began at its current location in August 2008 with an enrollment of 4,000 students. Enrollment increased to 5,200 in 2009 and 6,511 in 2010 as new buildings provided available space. Projected full enrollment is 16,000.

== Academics ==
Northeast Lakeview College is accredited by the Southern Association of Colleges and Schools Commission on Colleges. NLC offers degrees resulting in Associate of Arts (AA), Associate of Arts in Teaching (AAT), Associate of Applied Science (AAS), and Level 1 Certificates. In addition, NLC is home to the Texas A&M-Chevron Engineering Academy, a partnership with Texas A&M University where students are co-enrolled at NLC and Texas A&M for up to two years before transitioning to Texas A&M. During the first two years in the program, students are taught by Texas A&M faculty in engineering on the NLC campus.
