= List of college athletic programs in Texas =

This is a list of college athletic programs in the U.S. state of Texas.

== NCAA ==
=== Division I ===
Full NCAA Division I member colleges in Texas.
- FBS Football, - FCS Football, - Non-football

Team	School	City	Conference	Sport sponsorship						
Team	School	City	Conference	Football	Basketball		Baseball	Softball	Soccer	
Team	School	City	Conference	Football	M	W	Baseball	Softball	M	W
Abilene Christian Wildcats	Abilene Christian University	Abilene	UAC	FCS	Yes	Yes	Yes	Yes	No	Yes
Baylor Bears	Baylor University	Waco	Big 12	FBS	Yes	Yes	Yes	Yes	No	Yes
East Texas A&M Lions	East Texas A&M University	Commerce	Southland	FCS	Yes	Yes	No	Yes	No	Yes
Houston Cougars	University of Houston	Houston	Big 12	FBS	Yes	Yes	Yes	Yes	No	Yes
Houston Christian Huskies	Houston Christian University	Houston	Southland	FCS	Yes	Yes	Yes	Yes	Yes (Note: Houston Christian, Incarnate Word, and UTRGV's men's soccer teams compete in the Ohio Valley Conference.)	Yes
Incarnate Word Cardinals	University of the Incarnate Word	San Antonio	Southland	FCS	Yes	Yes	Yes	Yes	Yes	Yes
Lamar Cardinals and Lady Cardinals	Lamar University	Beaumont	Southland	FCS	Yes	Yes	Yes	Yes	No	Yes
North Texas Mean Green	University of North Texas	Denton	AAC	FBS	Yes	Yes	No	Yes	No	Yes
Prairie View A&M Panthers and Lady Panthers	Prairie View A&M University	Prairie View	SWAC	FCS	Yes	Yes	Yes	Yes	No	Yes
Rice Owls	Rice University	Houston	AAC	FBS	Yes	Yes	Yes	No	No	Yes
Sam Houston Bearkats	Sam Houston State University	Huntsville	C-USA	FBS	Yes	Yes	Yes	Yes	No	Yes
SMU Mustangs	Southern Methodist University	University Park	ACC	FBS	Yes	Yes	No	No	Yes	Yes
Stephen F. Austin Lumberjacks and Ladyjacks	Stephen F. Austin State University	Nacogdoches	Southland	FCS	Yes	Yes	Yes	Yes	No	Yes
Tarleton State Texans	Tarleton State University	Stephenville	UAC	FCS	Yes	Yes	Yes	Yes	No	Yes
TCU Horned Frogs and Lady Frogs	Texas Christian University	Fort Worth	Big 12	FBS	Yes	Yes	Yes	No	No	Yes
Texas Longhorns	University of Texas at Austin	Austin	SEC	FBS	Yes	Yes	Yes	Yes	No	Yes
Texas A&M Aggies	Texas A&M University	College Station	SEC	FBS	Yes	Yes	Yes	Yes	No	Yes
Texas A&M-Corpus Christi Islanders	Texas A&M University-Corpus Christi	Corpus Christi	Southland	No	Yes	Yes	Yes	Yes	No	Yes
Texas Southern Tigers and Lady Tigers	Texas Southern University	Houston	SWAC	FCS	Yes	Yes	Yes	Yes	No	Yes
Texas State Bobcats	Texas State University	San Marcos	Pac-12	FBS	Yes	Yes	Yes	Yes	No	Yes
Texas Tech Red Raiders and Lady Raiders (Note: Texas Tech uses "Lady Raiders" for women's sports teams that have men's counterparts, most notably women's basketball. "Red Raiders" is used in sports that are sponsored only for one sex, whether men or women.)	Texas Tech University	Lubbock	Big 12	FBS	Yes	Yes	Yes	Yes	No	Yes
UT Arlington Mavericks	University of Texas at Arlington	Arlington	WAC	No	Yes	Yes	Yes	Yes	No	No
UTEP Miners	University of Texas at El Paso	El Paso	C-USA	FBS	Yes	Yes	No	Yes	No	Yes
UTRGV Vaqueros	University of Texas Rio Grande Valley	Edinburg	Southland	FCS	Yes	Yes	Yes	No	Yes	Yes
UTSA Roadrunners	University of Texas at San Antonio	San Antonio	AAC	FBS	Yes	Yes	Yes	Yes	No	Yes

=== Division II ===
Full NCAA Division II member colleges in Texas.
- Football member, - Non-football member

Team	School	City	Conference	Sport sponsorship						
Team	School	City	Conference	Football	Basketball		Baseball	Softball	Soccer	
Team	School	City	Conference	Football	M	W	Baseball	Softball	M	W
Angelo State Rams	Angelo State University	San Angelo	Lone Star	Yes	Yes	Yes	Yes	Yes	No	Yes
Dallas Baptist Patriots	Dallas Baptist University	Dallas	Lone Star	No	Yes	No	Yes (Note: Dallas Baptist's baseball team competes in Division I as a member of the Pac-12.)	No	Yes	Yes
Lubbock Christian Chaparrals	Lubbock Christian University	Lubbock	Lone Star	No	Yes	Yes	Yes	Yes	Yes	Yes
Midwestern State Mustangs	Midwestern State University	Wichita Falls	Lone Star	Yes	Yes	Yes	No	Yes	Yes	Yes
St. Edward's Hilltoppers	St. Edward's University	Austin	Lone Star	No	Yes	Yes	Yes	Yes	Yes	Yes
St. Mary's Rattlers	St. Mary's University	San Antonio	Lone Star	No	Yes	Yes	Yes	Yes	Yes	Yes
Sul Ross State Lobos	Sul Ross State University	Alpine	Lone Star	Yes	Yes	Yes	Yes	Yes	Yes	Yes
Texas A&M International Dustdevils	Texas A&M International University	Laredo	Lone Star	No	Yes	Yes	Yes	Yes	Yes	Yes
Texas A&M-Kingsville Javelinas	Texas A&M University-Kingsville	Kingsville	Lone Star	Yes	Yes	Yes	Yes	Yes	No	No
UT Dallas Comets	University of Texas at Dallas	Richardson	Lone Star	No	Yes	Yes	Yes	Yes	Yes	Yes
UT Permian Basin Falcons	University of Texas Permian Basin	Odessa	Lone Star	Yes	Yes	Yes	Yes	Yes	Yes	Yes
UT Tyler Patriots	University of Texas at Tyler	Tyler	Lone Star	No	Yes	Yes	Yes	Yes	Yes	Yes
Texas Woman's Pioneers	Texas Woman's University	Denton	Lone Star	No	No	Yes	No	Yes	No	Yes
West Texas A&M Buffaloes	West Texas A&M University	Canyon	Lone Star	Yes	Yes	Yes	Yes	Yes	Yes	Yes

=== Division III ===
Full NCAA Division III member colleges in Texas.
- Football member, - Non-football member

Team	School	City	Conference	Sport sponsorship						
Team	School	City	Conference	Football	Basketball		Baseball	Softball	Soccer	
Team	School	City	Conference	Football	M	W	Baseball	Softball	M	W
Austin College 'Roos	Austin College	Sherman	SCAC	Yes	Yes	Yes	Yes	Yes	Yes	Yes
Concordia Tornados	Concordia University Texas	Austin	SCAC	No	Yes	Yes	Yes	Yes	Yes	Yes
Dallas Crusaders	University of Dallas	Irving	SCAC	No	Yes	Yes	Yes	Yes	Yes	Yes
East Texas Baptist Tigers	East Texas Baptist University	Marshall	American Southwest	Yes	Yes	Yes	Yes	Yes	Yes	Yes
Hardin-Simmons Cowboys	Hardin-Simmons University	Abilene	American Southwest	Yes	Yes	Yes	Yes	Yes	Yes	Yes
Howard Payne Yellow Jackets	Howard Payne University	Brownwood	American Southwest	Yes	Yes	Yes	Yes	Yes	Yes	Yes
LeTourneau Yellow Jackets	LeTourneau University	Longview	SCAC	No	Yes	Yes	Yes	Yes	Yes	Yes
Mary Hardin-Baylor Crusaders	University of Mary Hardin-Baylor	Belton	American Southwest	Yes	Yes	Yes	Yes	Yes	Yes	Yes
McMurry War Hawks	McMurry University	Abilene	American Southwest	Yes	Yes	Yes	Yes	Yes	Yes	Yes
St. Thomas Celts	University of St. Thomas	Houston	SCAC	No	Yes	Yes	Yes	Yes	Yes	Yes
Schreiner Mountaineers	Schreiner University	Kerrville	American Southwest	Yes	Yes	Yes	Yes	Yes	Yes	Yes
Southwestern Pirates	Southwestern University	Georgetown	SAA	Yes	Yes	Yes	Yes	Yes	Yes	Yes
Texas Lutheran Bulldogs	Texas Lutheran University	Seguin	SCAC	Yes	Yes	Yes	Yes	Yes	Yes	Yes
Trinity Tigers	Trinity University	San Antonio	SAA	Yes	Yes	Yes	Yes	Yes	Yes	Yes

== NAIA ==
Full NAIA member colleges in Texas.
- Football member, - Non-football member

Team	School	City	Conference	Sport sponsorship						
Team	School	City	Conference	Football	Basketball		Baseball	Softball	Soccer	
Team	School	City	Conference	Football	M	W	Baseball	Softball	M	W
Huston-Tillotson Rams	Huston-Tillotson University	Austin	HBCU	No	Yes	Yes	Yes	Yes	Yes	Yes
Jarvis Christian Bulldogs	Jarvis Christian University	Hawkins	Red River	No	Yes	Yes	Yes	Yes	Yes	Yes
Nelson Lions	Nelson University	Waxahachie	Sooner	Yes	Yes	Yes	Yes	Yes	Yes	Yes
North American Stallions	North American University	Stafford	Red River	No	Yes	Yes	No	No	Yes	Yes
UNT Dallas Trailblazers (Note: UNT Dallas has planned to add baseball, men's and women's soccer, and softball at a later time.)	University of North Texas at Dallas	Dallas	Red River	No	Yes	Yes	No	No	No	No
Our Lady of the Lake Saints	Our Lady of the Lake University	San Antonio	Red River	No	Yes	Yes	Yes	Yes	Yes	Yes
Paul Quinn Tigers	Paul Quinn College	Dallas	HBCU	No	Yes	Yes	No	No	Yes	Yes
Texas A&M-San Antonio Jaguars	Texas A&M University-San Antonio	San Antonio	Red River	No	Yes	Yes	No	Yes	Yes	Yes
Texas A&M-Texarkana Eagles	Texas A&M University-Texarkana	Texarkana	Red River	Yes	Yes	Yes	Yes	Yes	Yes	Yes
Texas A&M-Victoria Jaguars	Texas A&M University-Victoria	Victoria	Red River	No	No	No	Yes	Yes	Yes	Yes
Texas College Steers	Texas College	Tyler	Red River	Yes (Note: Texas College's football team competes in the Sooner Athletic Conference.)	Yes	Yes	Yes	Yes	Yes	Yes
Texas Wesleyan Rams	Texas Wesleyan University	Fort Worth	Sooner	Yes	Yes	Yes	Yes	Yes	Yes	Yes
Wayland Baptist Pioneers	Wayland Baptist University	Plainview	Sooner	Yes	Yes	Yes	Yes	Yes	Yes	Yes
Wiley Wildcats	Wiley University	Marshall	HBCU	No	Yes	Yes	Yes	No	No	No

== NJCAA ==
Team	School	City	Conference
Alvin Dolphins	Alvin Community College	Alvin	Southwest JC
Angelina Roadrunners	Angelina College	Lufkin	Southwest JC
Blinn Buccaneers	Blinn College	Brenham	Southwest JC
Brookhaven Bears	Brookhaven College	Farmers Branch	Metro
Cedar Valley Suns	Cedar Valley College	Lancaster	Metro
Cisco Wranglers	Cisco College	Cisco	North Texas JC
Clarendon Bulldogs	Clarendon College	Clarendon	Western JC
Coastal Bend Cougars	Coastal Bend College	Beeville	Southwest JC
Collin County Cougars	Collin College	Plano	North Texas JC
Eastfield Harvesters	Eastfield College	Mesquite	Metro
El Paso Tejanos	El Paso Community College	El Paso	Western JC
Frank Phillips Plainsmen	Frank Phillips College	Borger	Western JC
Galveston Whitecaps	Galveston College	Galveston	Southwest JC
Grayson County Vikings	Grayson County College	Denison	North Texas JC
Hill Rebels	Hill College	Hillsboro	North Texas JC
Howard (Texas) Hawks	Howard College	Big Spring	Western JC
Jacksonville Jaguars	Jacksonville College	Jacksonville	Southwest JC
Kilgore Rangers	Kilgore College	Kilgore	Southwest JC
Lamar State Seahawks	Lamar State College-Port Arthur	Port Arthur	Southwest JC
Lee Navigators	Lee College	Baytown	Southwest JC
McLennan Highlanders	McLennan Community College	Waco	North Texas JC
Midland Chaparrals	Midland College	Midland	Western JC
Mountain View Lions	Mountain View College	Dallas	Metro
Navarro Bulldogs	Navarro College	Corsicana	Southwest JC
North Central Texas Lions	North Central Texas College	Gainesville	North Texas JC
North Lake Blazers	North Lake College	Irving	Metro
Northeast Texas Eagles	Northeast Texas Community College	Mt. Pleasant	Southwest JC
Odessa Wranglers	Odessa College	Odessa	Western JC
Panola Ponies	Panola College	Carthage	Southwest JC
Paris Dragons	Paris Junior College	Paris	Southwest JC
Ranger Rangers	Ranger College	Ranger	North Texas JC
Richland Thunder Ducks	Richland College	Dallas	Metro
San Jacinto-Central Ravens	San Jacinto College-Central	Pasadena	Southwest JC
San Jacinto-North Gators	San Jacinto College-North	Houston	Southwest JC
San Jacinto-South Coyotes	San Jacinto College-South	Houston	Southwest JC
South Plains Texans	South Plains College	Levelland	Western JC
Southwestern Christian Rams	Southwestern Christian College	Terrell	North Texas JC
Temple Leopards	Temple College	Temple	North Texas JC
Trinity Valley Cardinals	Trinity Valley Community College	Athens	Southwest JC
Tyler Apaches	Tyler Junior College	Tyler	Southwest JC
Vernon Chaparrals	Vernon College	Vernon	North Texas JC
Victoria Pirates	Victoria College	Victoria	Southwest JC
Weatherford Coyotes	Weatherford College	Weatherford	North Texas JC
Western Texas Westerners	Western Texas College	Snyder	Western JC
Wharton County Pioneers	Wharton County Junior College	Wharton	Southwest JC

== NCCAA ==
Full NCCAA member colleges in Texas.
- Non-football member

Team	School	City	Conference
Arlington Baptist Patriots	Arlington Baptist University (Note: Also holds ACCA membership.)	Arlington	
Dallas Christian Crusaders	Dallas Christian College	Farmers Branch	
Southwestern Adventist Knights	Southwestern Adventist University (Note: Also holds USCAA membership.)	Keene	
CBS Ambassadors	College of Biblical Studies	Houston	

== See also ==
- List of NCAA Division I institutions
- List of NCAA Division II institutions
- List of NCAA Division III institutions
- List of NAIA institutions
- List of USCAA institutions
- List of NCCAA institutions
- List of NJCAA Division I schools
- List of NJCAA Division II schools
- List of NJCAA Division III schools
