= List of colleges and universities in the Dallas–Fort Worth metroplex =

The Dallas–Fort Worth metroplex is a metropolitan statistical area consisting of two metropolitan divisions: Dallas–Plano–Irving and Fort Worth–Arlington, within the U.S. state of Texas. The Metroplex is home to numerous institutions of higher learning, including:

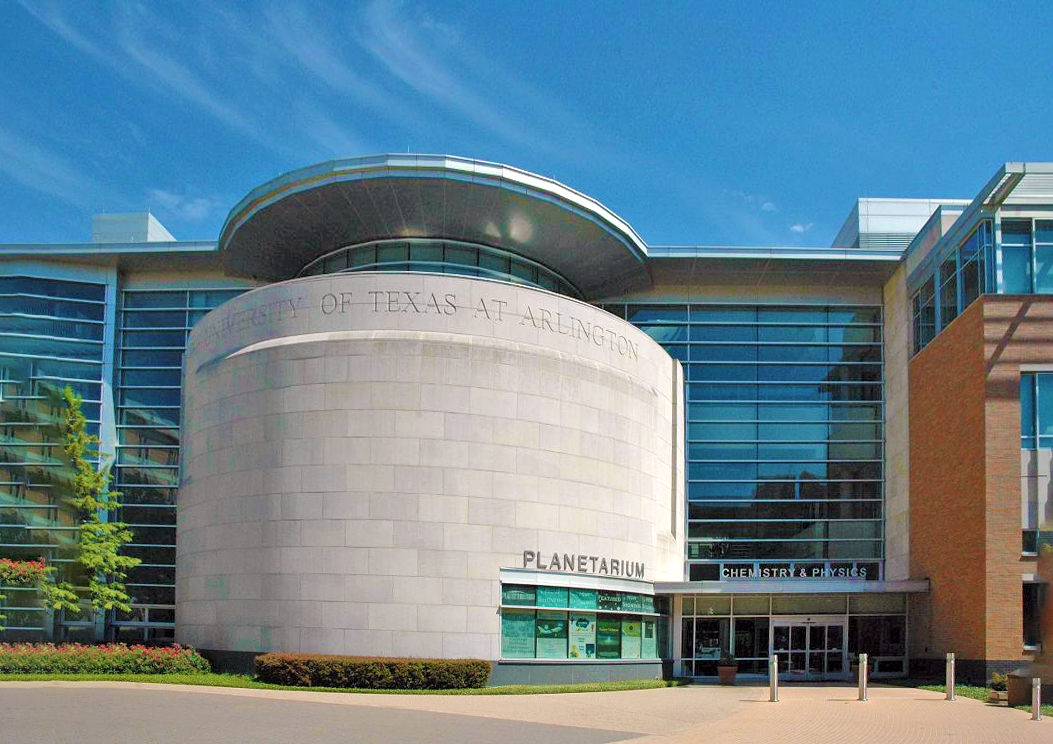
University of Texas at Arlington

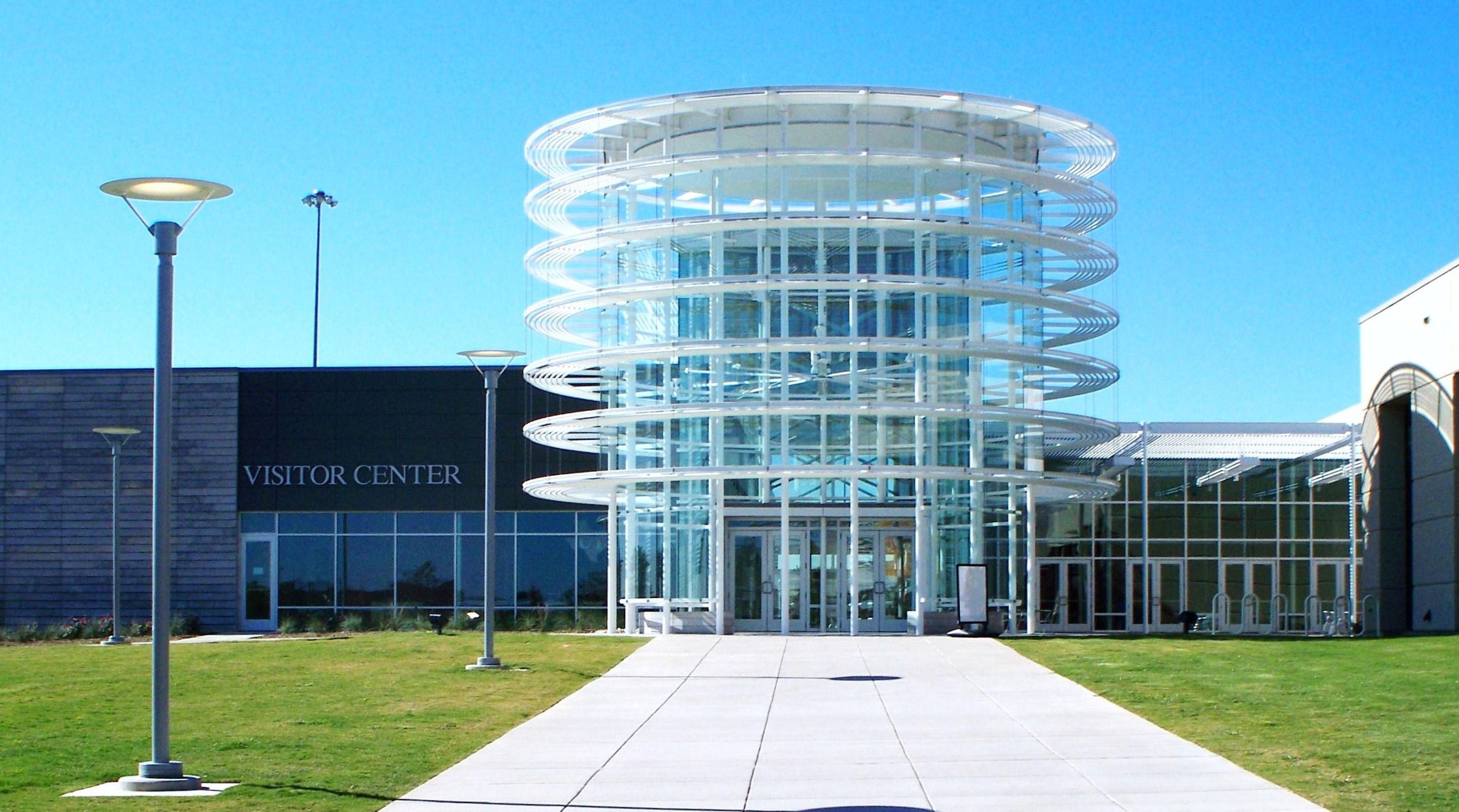
University of Texas at Dallas

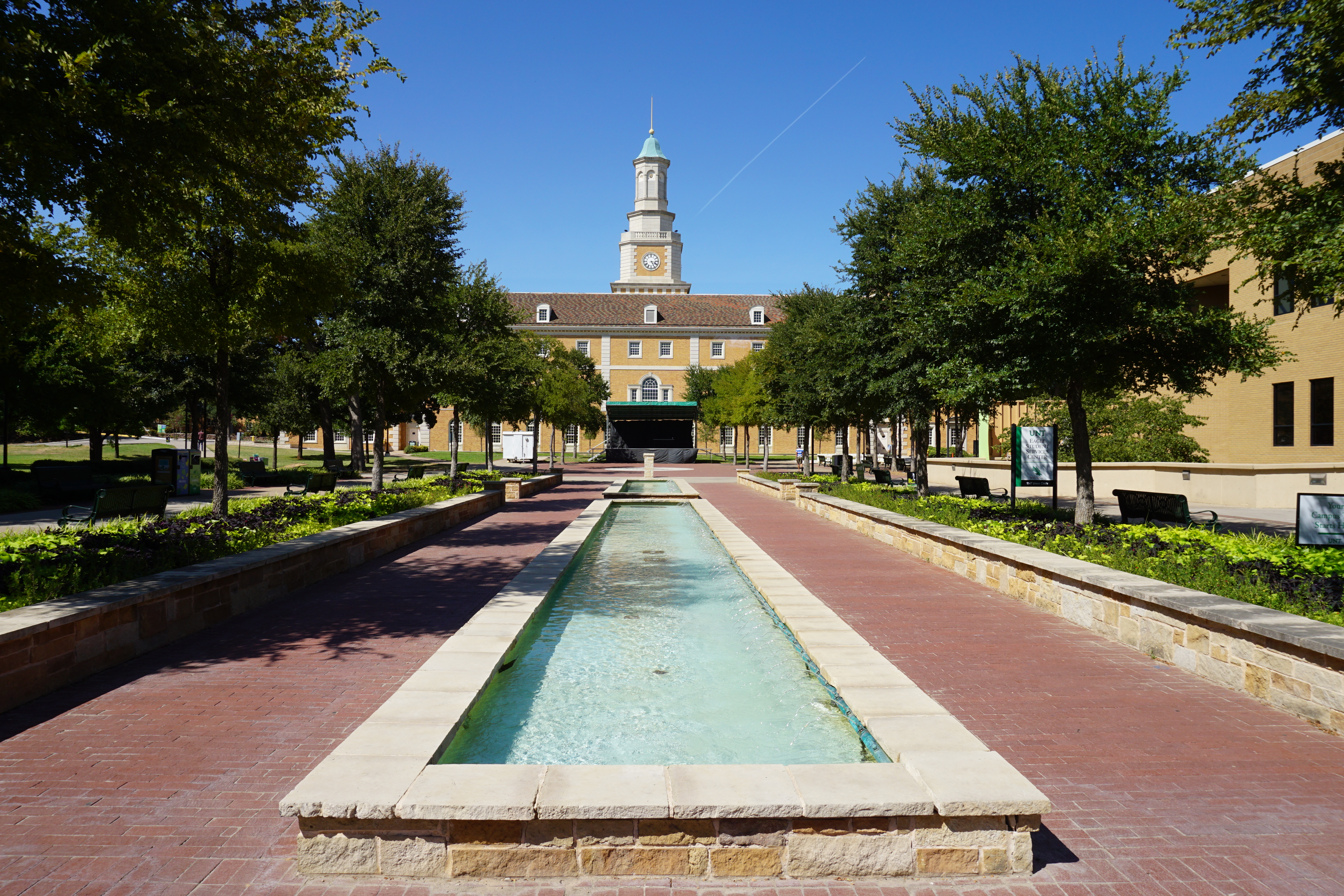
University of North Texas

== Public universities ==
Public universities
Institution	System	Enrollment	Location	Mascot	Athletic affiliation (conference)
University of Texas at Arlington	University of Texas System	45,949	Arlington	Mavericks	NCAA Division I (WAC); Non–football
University of Texas at Dallas	University of Texas System	31,570	Richardson	Comets	NCAA Division III (American Southwest); Non–football
University of North Texas	University of North Texas System	42,375	Denton	Mean Green	NCAA Division I FBS (American)
University of North Texas at Dallas	University of North Texas System	3,030	Dallas	Trailblazers	NAIA (Sooner); Non–football
East Texas A&M University	Texas A&M University System	12,385	Commerce	Lions	NCAA Division I FCS (Southland)
Texas Woman's University	Texas Woman’s University’s System	15,472	Denton	Pioneers	NCAA Division II (Lone Star); Women's sports only

== Private universities ==
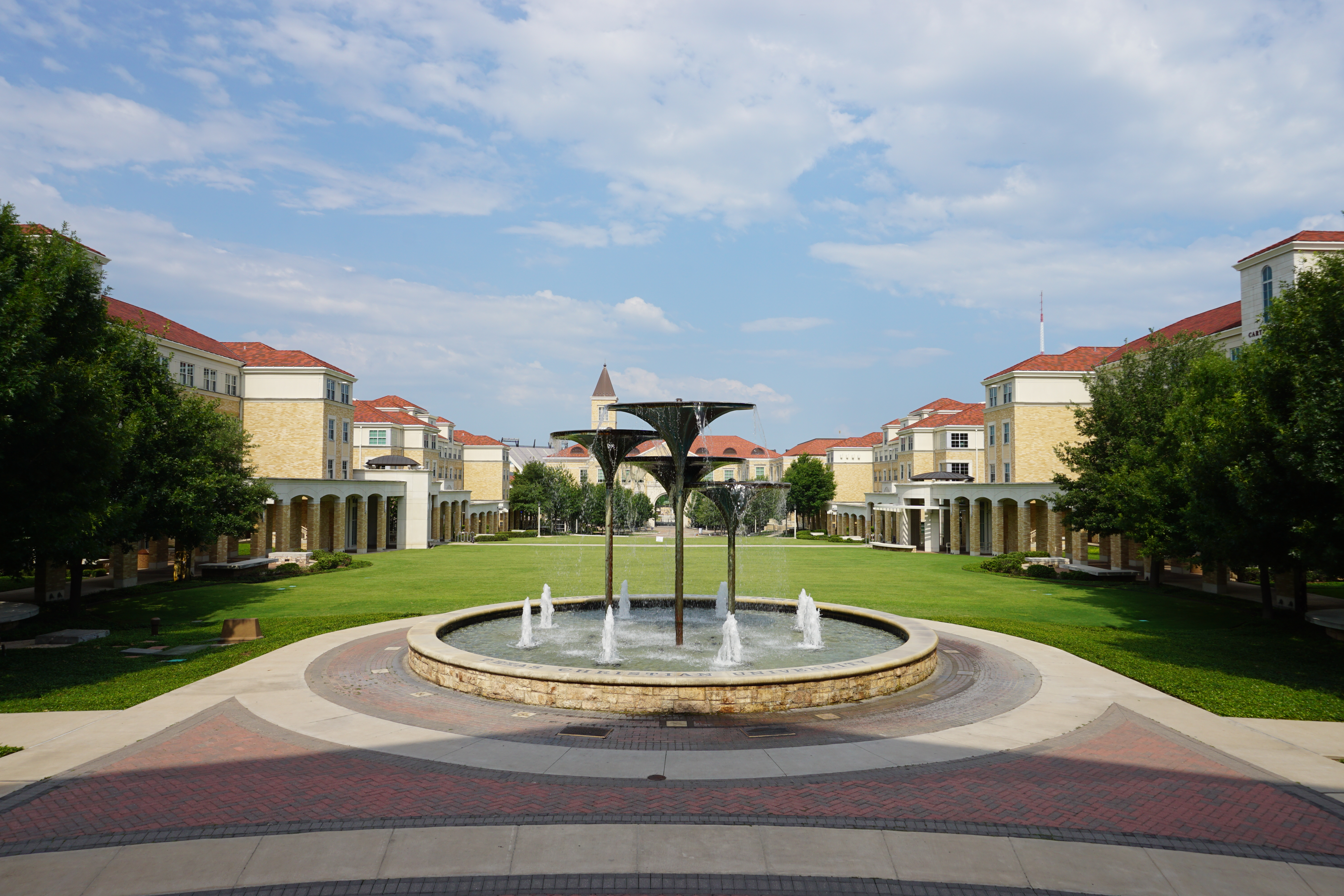
Texas Christian University

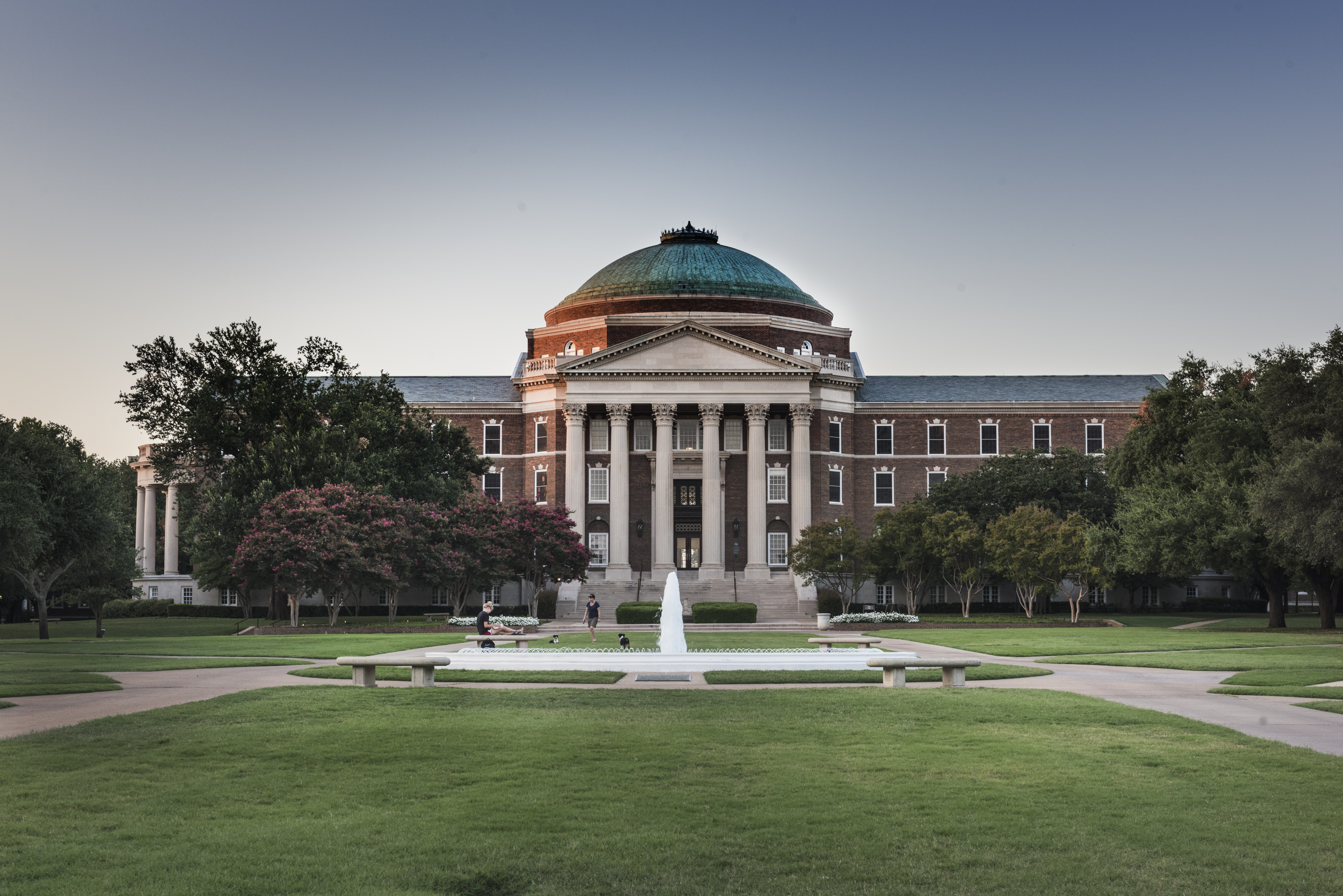
Southern Methodist University

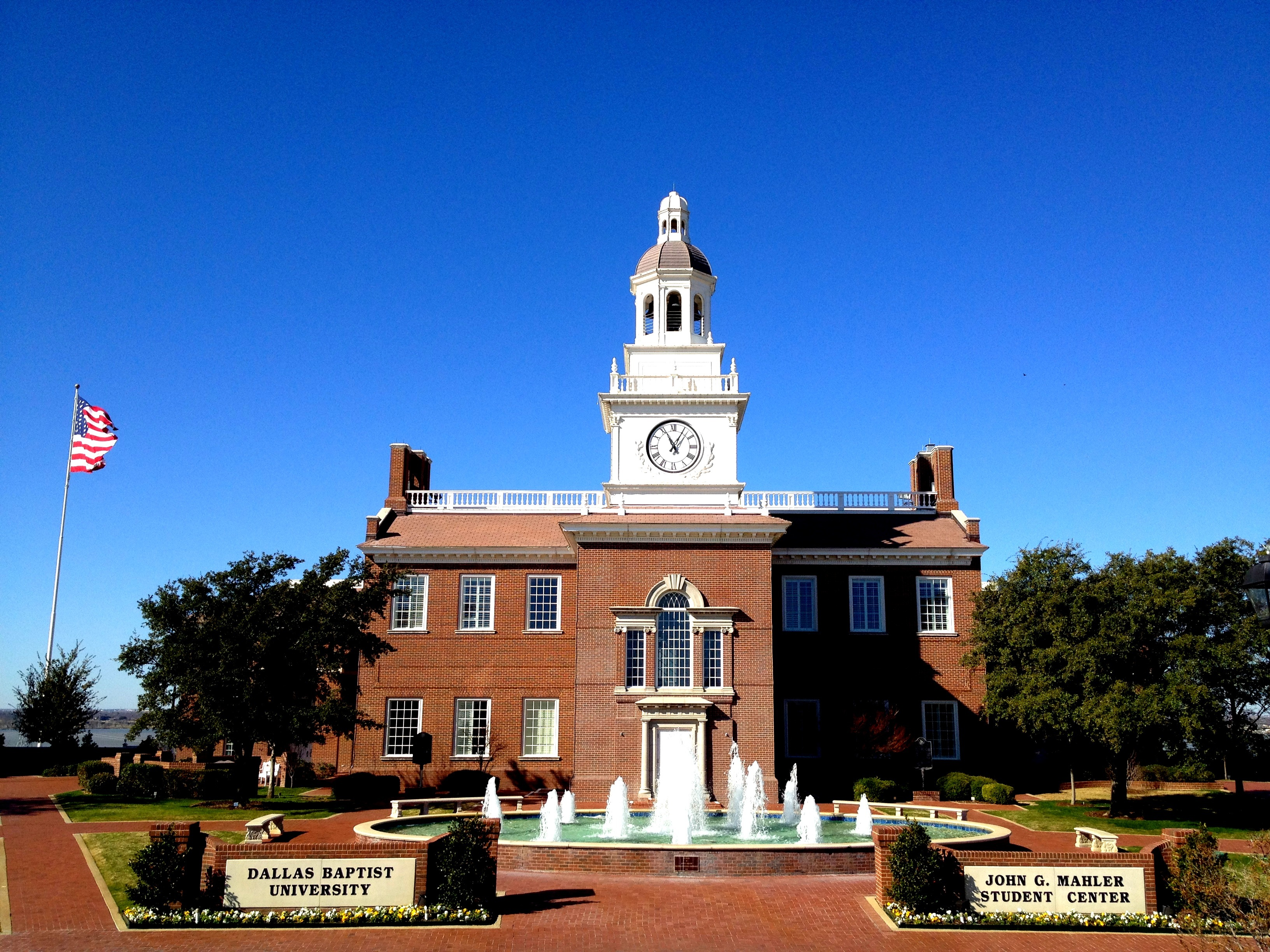
Dallas Baptist University

Private universities
Institution	Enrollment	Location	Mascot	Athletic affiliation (conference)
Southern Methodist University	11,643	University Park	Mustangs	NCAA Division I FBS (ACC)
Texas Christian University	10,394	Fort Worth	Horned Frogs	NCAA Division I FBS (Big 12)
Dallas Baptist University	5,445	Dallas	Patriots	NCAA Division II (Lone Star); Non–football, compete in Conference USA at the Division I level for baseball
Texas Wesleyan University	3,378	Fort Worth	Rams	NAIA (Sooner)
Southwestern Baptist Theological Seminary	2,674	Fort Worth	No mascot	No athletics (N/A)
Dallas Theological Seminary	2,601	Dallas	No mascot	No athletics (N/A)
University of Dallas	2,387	Irving	Crusaders	NCAA Division III (SCAC); Non–football, compete in Texas Rugby Union at the Division II level for rugby
Nelson University	2,012	Waxahachie	Lions	NAIA NCCAA (Sooner)
Amberton University	1,452	Garland	No mascot	No athletics (N/A)
Parker University	977	Dallas	Patriots	No athletics (N/A)
Southwestern Adventist University	800	Keene	Knights	USCAA, NCCAA
The King's University	650	Southlake	No mascot	No athletics (N/A)
Northwood University	534	Cedar Hill	Timberwolves	No athletics (N/A)
Dallas Christian College	336	Farmers Branch	Crusaders	NCCAA Division II (ACCA); Non-football
Arlington Baptist University	220	Arlington	Patriots	NCCAA Division II (ACCA); Non-football
Criswell College	198	Dallas	No mascot	No athletics (N/A)
Dallas International University	150	Dallas	Chamicuro Tigers	No athletics (N/A)

== Historically black colleges and universities ==
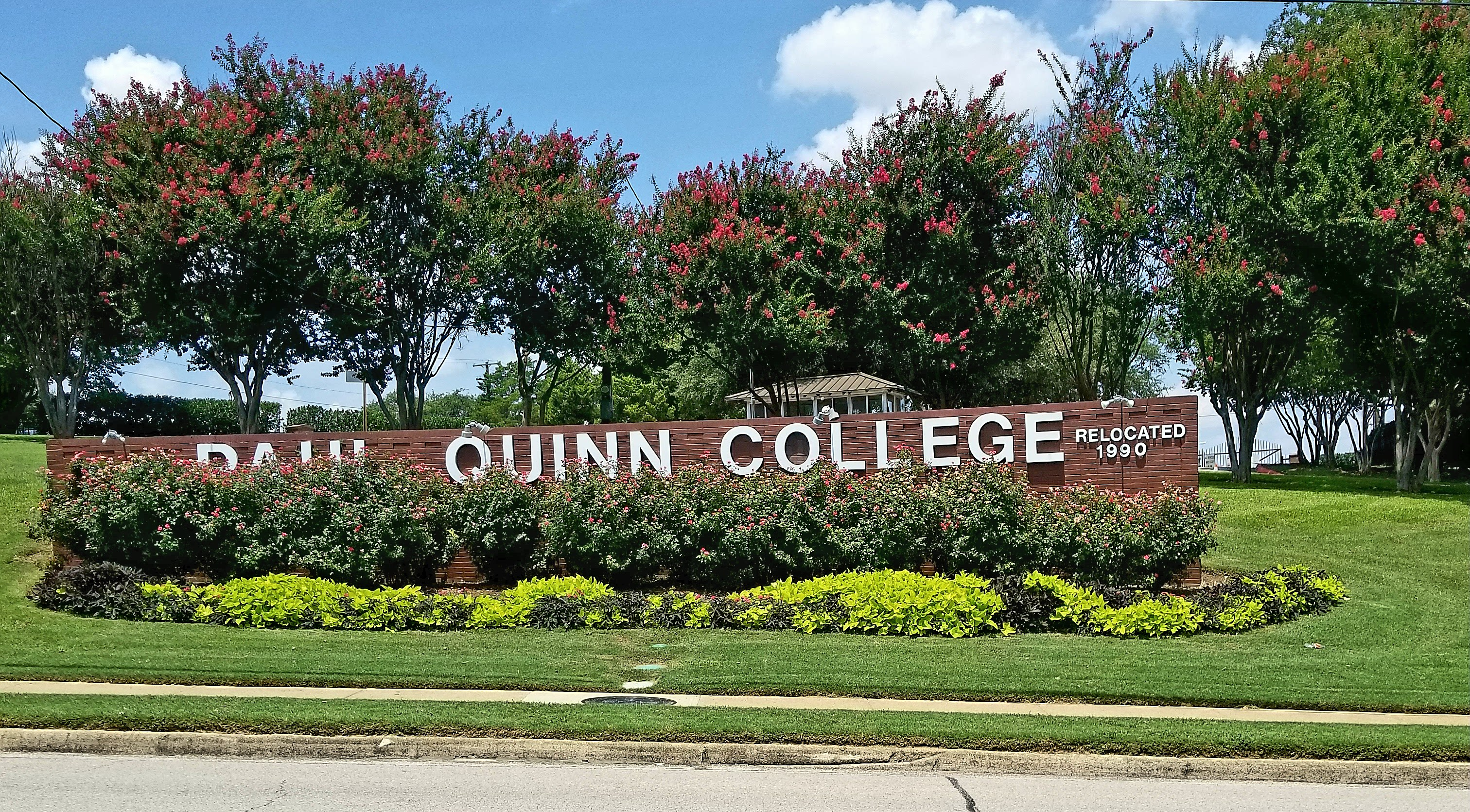
Paul Quinn College

Historically Black colleges and universities
School	Enrollment	Location	Mascot	Athletic affiliation (conference)
Paul Quinn College	600	Dallas	Tigers	NAIA (Red River); Non–football
Southwestern Christian College	224	Terrell	Rams	NJCAA (NTJCAC); Non-football

== Community colleges ==
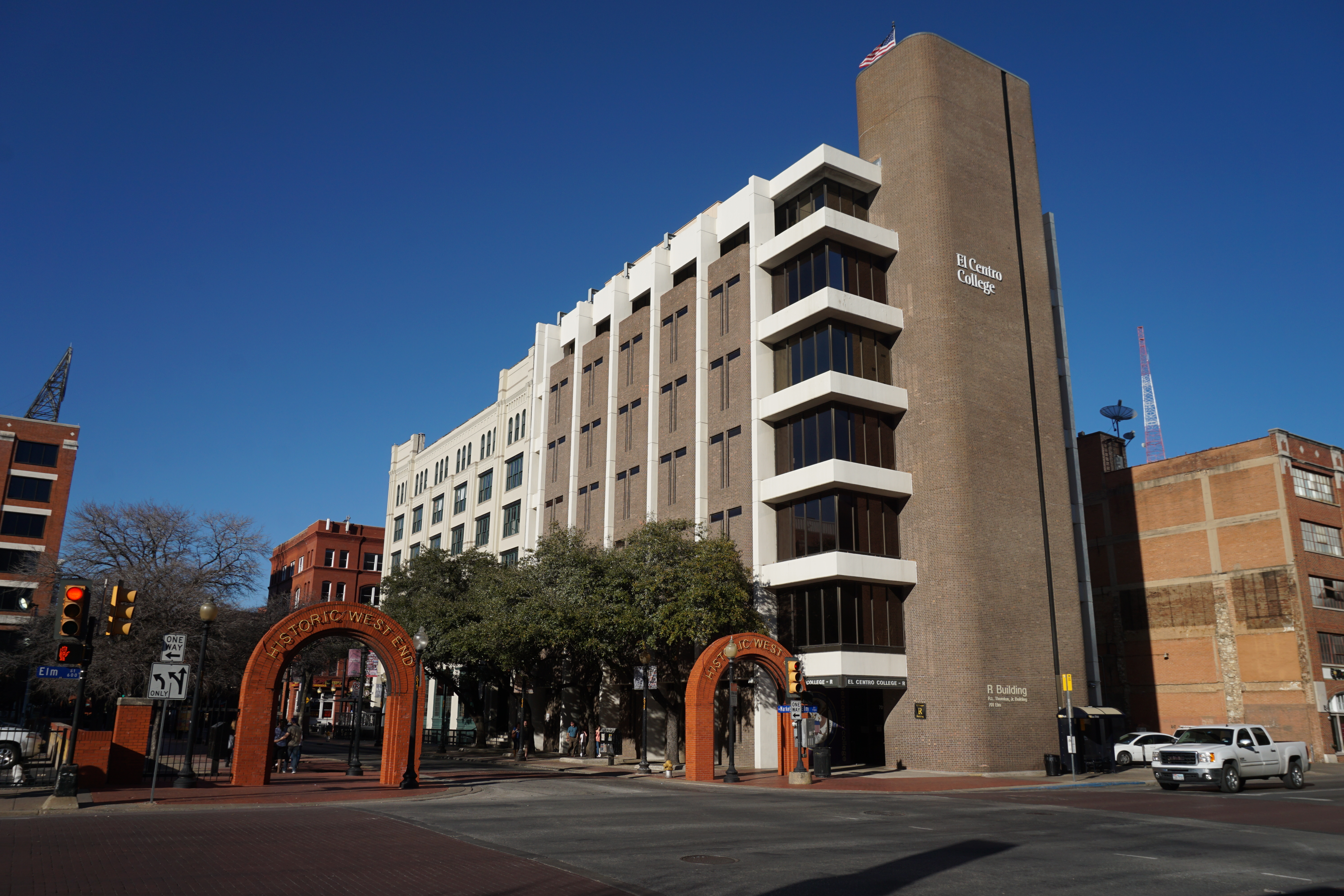
El Centro College

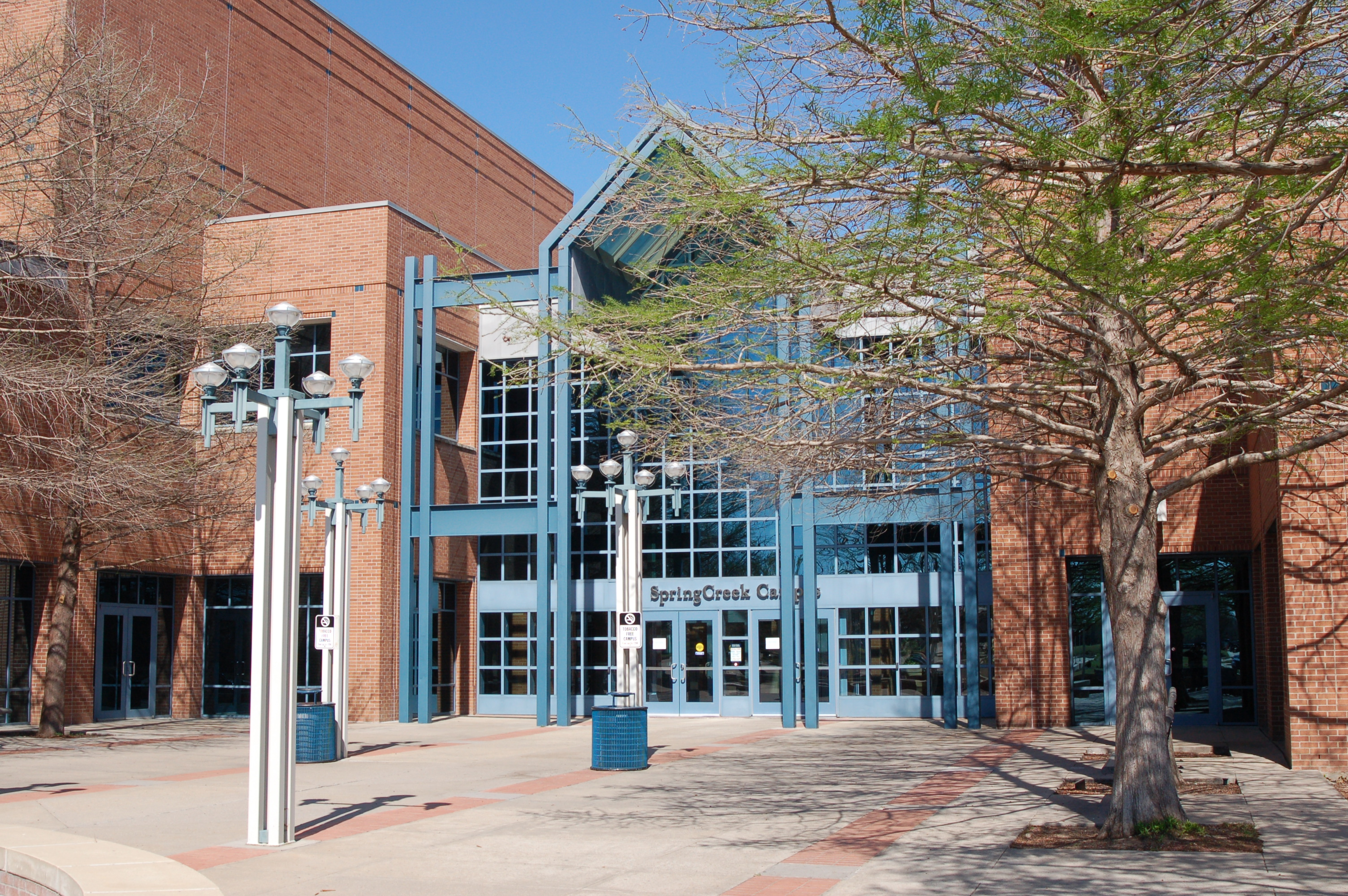
Collin College

Community colleges
Institution	Enrollment	Location	Mascot	Athletic affiliation
Dallas College
Brookhaven College	11,000	Farmers Branch	Bears	NJCAA (Metro Athletic Conference)
Cedar Valley College	6,000	Lancaster	Suns	NJCAA (Metro Athletic Conference)
Eastfield College	14,214	Mesquite	Harvesters	NJCAA (Metro Athletic Conference)
El Centro College	12,028	Dallas	Chaparrals	No athletics (N/A)
Mountain View College	8,638	Dallas	Lions	NJCAA (Metro Athletic Conference)
North Lake College	10,570	Irving	Blazers	NJCAA (Metro Athletic Conference)
Richland College	20,000	Dallas	Thunderducks	NJCAA (Metro Athletic Conference)
Other community colleges
Collin College	55,000	Collin County and Rockwall County	Cougars	NJCAA (NTJCAC)
Tarrant County College	50,000	Tarrant County	Trailblazers	No athletics (N/A)
North Central Texas College	10,327	Denton County and surrounding areas (based in Gainesville)	Lions	NJCAA (NTJCAC)
Navarro College	9,230	Ellis County and surrounding areas (based in Corsicana)	Bulldogs	NJCAA (Southwest)
Trinity Valley Community College	7,743	Kaufman County and surrounding areas (based in Athens)	Cardinals	NJCAA (Southwest)
Weatherford College	6,000	Parker County and surrounding areas	Coyotes	NJCAA (NTJCAC)
Paris Junior College	5,000	Hunt County and surrounding areas (based in Paris)	Dragons	NJCAA (Southwest)
Hill College	4,236	Johnson County and surrounding areas (based in Hillsboro)	Rebels	NJCAA (NTJCAC)

== Career-based institutions ==
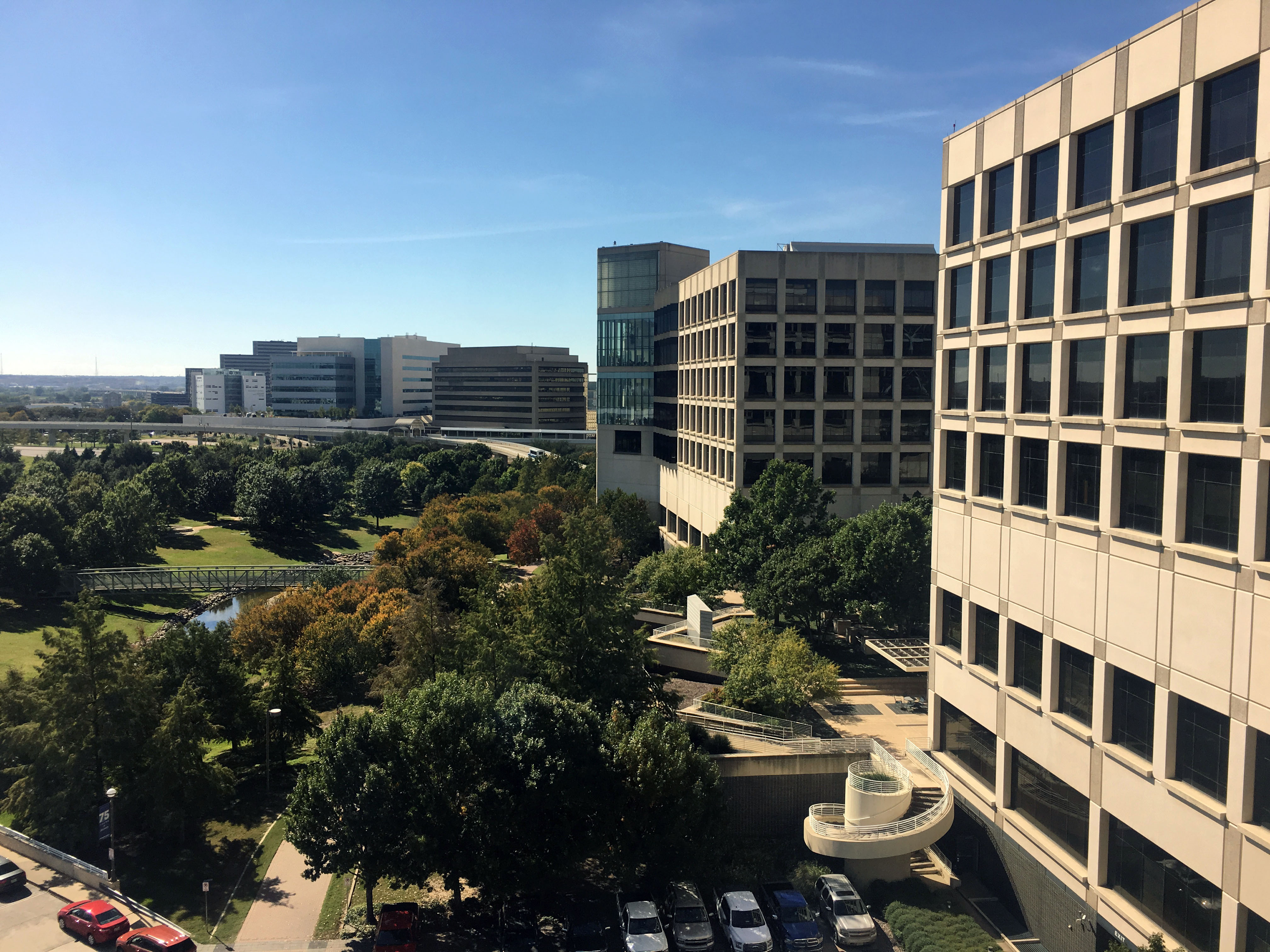
University of Texas Southwestern Medical Center

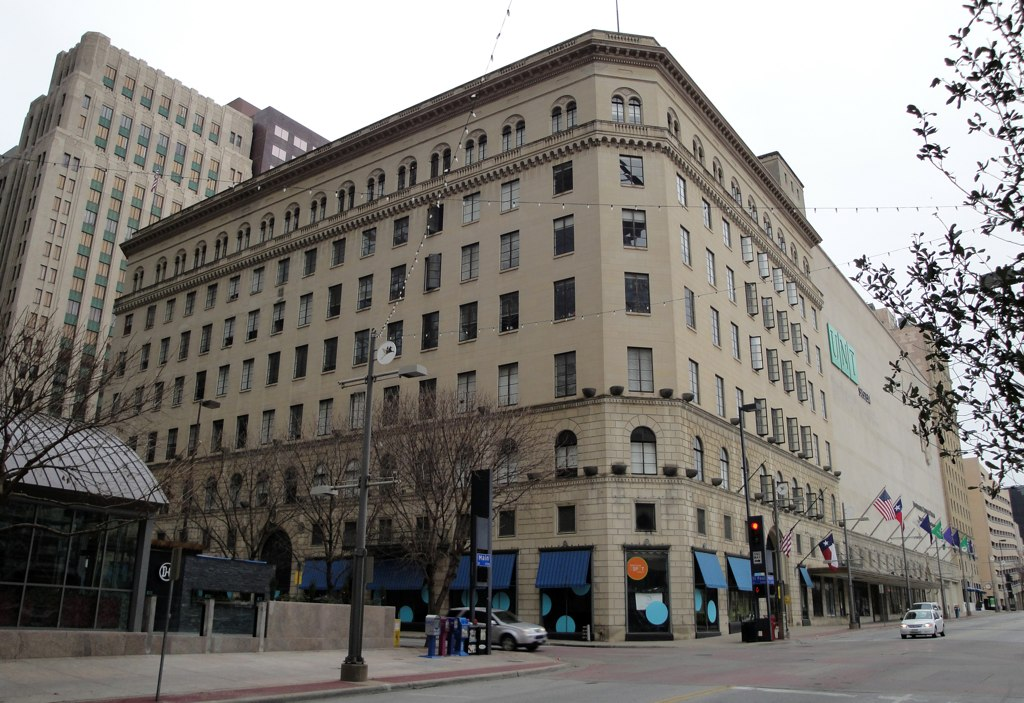
University of North Texas at Dallas College of Law

Career-based institutions
Institution	Enrollment	Location
University of North Texas Health Science Center	2,270	Fort Worth
University of Texas Southwestern Medical Center	2,235	Dallas
Parker University	977	Dallas
Art Institute of Dallas	850	Dallas
Texas A&M University College of Dentistry	594	Dallas
Texas A&M University School of Law	452	Fort Worth
University of North Texas at Dallas College of Law	423	Dallas
Texas State Technical College North Texas	313	Red Oak
Wade College	207	Dallas
Texas Tech University Health Sciences Center at Dallas	146	Dallas

== See also ==
- List of colleges and universities in Texas
- Education in Dallas
