= Cisco College =

Community college in Cisco, Texas, U.S.

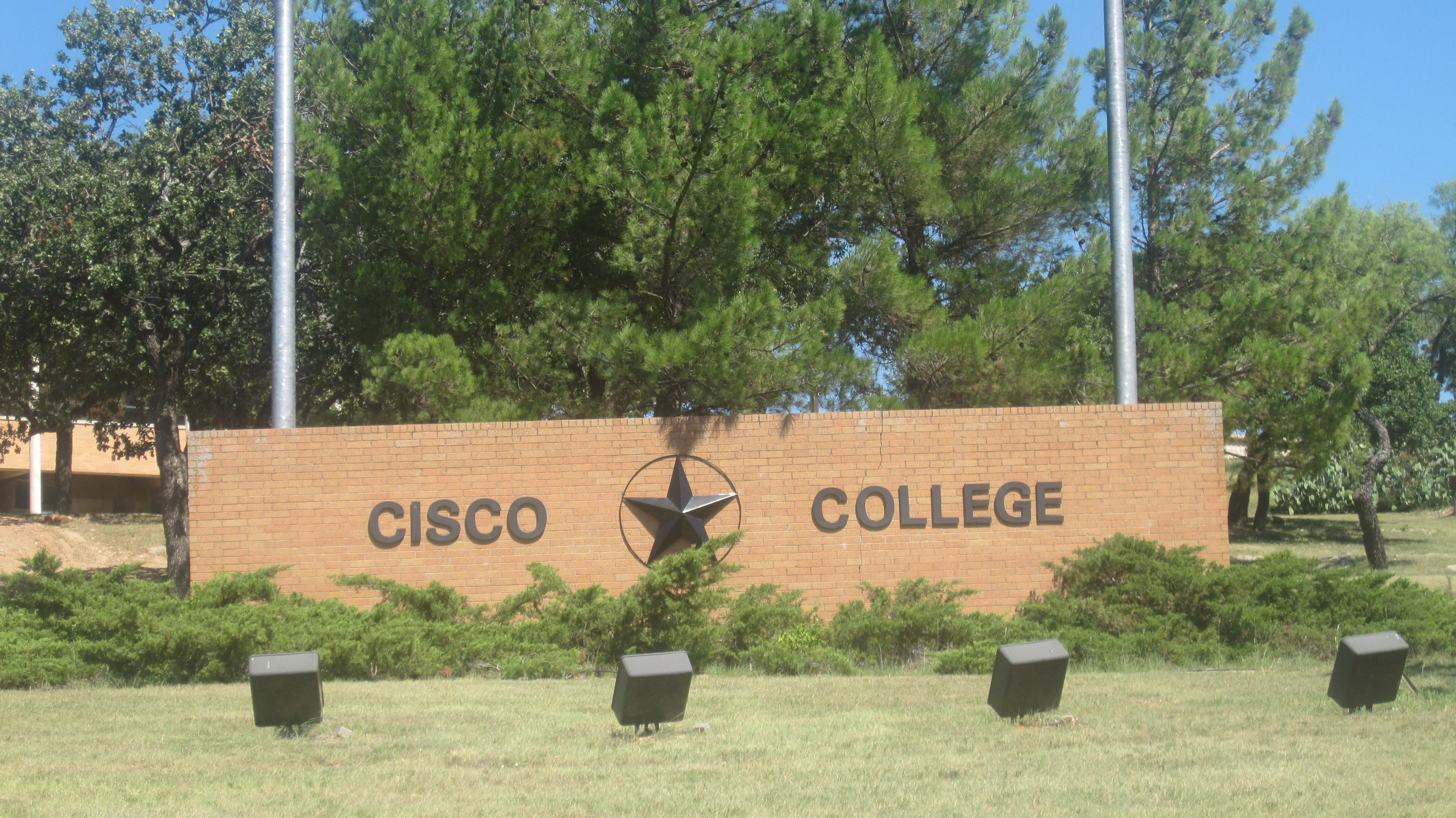
- Cisco College in Cisco, Texas
- Former name: Cisco Junior College (1939–2009)
- Type: Community college
- Established: 1939
- President: Thad Anglin
- Undergraduates: 3,251 (Fall 2021)
- Location: Cisco and Abilene, Texas, U.S. 32.4017°N 98.9857°W
- Campus: Rural, 92 acres (370,000 m^{2})
- Colors: Blue and white
- Nickname: Wranglers
- Sporting affiliations: NJCAA – NTJCAC; Compete in Southwest Conference for football
- Website: www.cisco.edu

Cisco College is a community college in Cisco, Texas and Abilene, Texas. The main campus is 92 acres (370,000 m^{2}) outside of Cisco, and the Abilene Educational Center is 38 acres (150,000 m^{2}) in Abilene. The college is accredited to award associate degrees by the Southern Association of Colleges and Schools.

== Athletics ==
Cisco College's athletic teams are known as the Wranglers. They compete in football, baseball, softball, volleyball, women's basketball, and women's soccer. They are members of the North Texas Junior College Athletic Conference (NTJCAC) of the NJCAA. However, the NTJCAC does not offer football, so for football Cisco College competes in the Southwest Junior College Conference.

== Notable alumni ==
- Wayne Coffey, American football player
- John Davis, American football player
- James Dixon, American football player
- Clint Dolezel, American football player
- Bo Kelly, American football player
- V'Keon Lacey, American football player
- Sid Miller, Republican former member of the Texas House of Representatives from Erath County; candidate for Texas Commissioner of Agriculture on March 4, 2014, primary election
- Gary Morris, actor, singer
- Randy Pippin, college football coach
- Daryl Richardson, American football player
- Matt Schaefer, Republican member of the Texas House of Representatives from Tyler, Texas; United States Navy officer and lawyer
