= St. Thomas Celts =

- University: University of St. Thomas
- Association: NCAA Division III
- Conference: Southern Collegiate Athletic Conference
- Athletic director: Todd Smith
- Location: Houston, Texas
- First year: 1947, 2006
- Varsity teams: 16
- Basketball arena: Jerabeck Athletic Center
- Nickname: Celts; Warriors (formerly)
- Mascot: Lenny the Lion
- Website: ustcelts.com
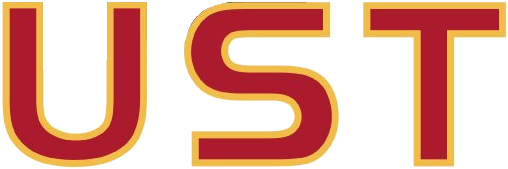

The St. Thomas Celts are the athletic teams that represent the University of St. Thomas, located in Houston, Texas, in intercollegiate sports as a member of the Division III level of the National Collegiate Athletic Association (NCAA), primarily competing in the Southern Collegiate Athletic Conference (SCAC) as a provisional member since the 2019–20 academic year. The Celts previously competed in the Red River Athletic Conference (RRAC) at the National Association of Intercollegiate Athletics (NAIA) from 2011–12 to 2018–19; as well as an NAIA Independent within the Association of Independent Institutions (AII) from 2007–08 to 2010–11.

== Varsity teams ==
UST competes in eight intercollegiate men's sports, nine women's sports, and two co-ed sports: Men's sports include baseball, basketball, cross country, golf, soccer, swimming, tennis and track & field; while women's sports include basketball, cross country, golf, soccer, softball, swimming, tennis, track & field and volleyball; and co-ed sports include cheerleading (spirit) and Esports.

== History ==
=== Original tenure ===
UST men's basketball dates back to 1947, in conjunction with the opening of the university. During their original athletic tenure, their mascot was the Warriors. Their men's basketball program disbanded in 1967. UST also hosted a baseball team from 1948 to 1969. Men's basketball temporarily returned for the 1984–85 season, posting a 10–23 record and losing in the NAIA District IV Tournament to Southwestern University, before the program (along with golf) was once again cut in 1985. 1984 was also when the UST athletic teams were first known as the Celts.

=== NAIA (2006–2019) ===
In fall 2006, the NAIA informed UST that its application to join had been accepted, bringing varsity intercollegiate athletics back to campus for the first time in over 20 years. Beginning in 2007, UST fielded both a women's volleyball team and a men's soccer team to compete as Independents within the Association of Independent Institutions (AII). The 2009–10 academic year marked the return of the UST men's varsity basketball team. From 2011 to 2019, UST competed in the NAIA as members of the RRAC.

=== Move to NCAA Division III ===
On February 14, 2018, UST announced it would become the SCAC's 10th member after completing an exploratory year in NCAA Division III. Pending acceptance into Division III after that, SCAC competition would begin in the 2019–20 season. As Division III and the SCAC require a minimum of 12 sports, UST added men's and women's tennis along with the return of baseball during the 2019–20 academic year. According to UST President Richard Ludwick, "[t]his is really recognition not only of the quality of our athletics program, but of the quality of our academics and institution as a whole. It is exciting to think about the level of competition that we have been invited to join."

The school became a provisional member of Division III in 2019.

In 2020, the Celts Baseball team played for the first time since 1969. They went 7-11 before the season ending due to the COVID-19 pandemic. On February 8, 2020, the Celts registered their first victory (an 11-7 victory over Howard Payne) since April 26, 1969 (a 2-1 defeat over Houston Baptist).

== See also ==
- List of college athletic programs in Texas
- List of NCAA Division III institutions
