= North Lake Early College High School =

High school in Dallas County, Texas, USA

Coordinates: 32°52′12″N 96°58′1″W

North Lake Early College High School, also known as North Lake Collegiate Academy, is a public high school located in Dallas County, Texas and operated by the Dallas Independent School District (DISD). It has a campus for 9th and 10th grade students at the main campus at North Lake College in Irving and will have a campus for 11th and 12th grade students in the future. Under Texas law, DISD can have operations, including schools, outside of its own boundaries, and North Lake College is not in the DISD boundaries. The school serves from grades 9-12 and has roughly 300 students in total.
