= North Central Texas College =

Community college in Gainesville, Texas, U.S.

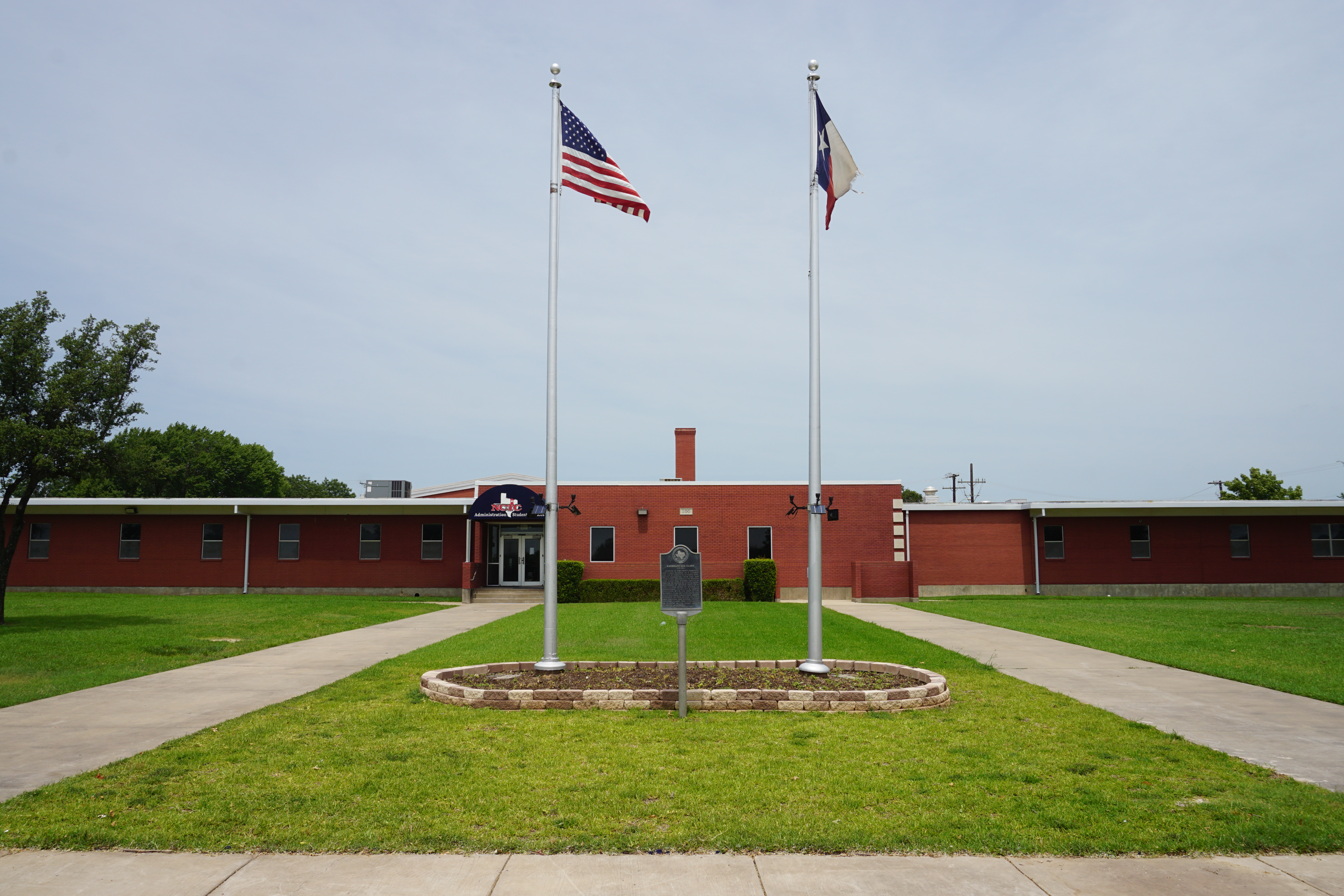
- Former names: Gainesville Junior College (1924-1961); Cooke County Junior College (1961-1974); Cooke County College (1974-1994)
- Type: Public community college
- Established: 1924
- President: Brent Wallace
- Location: Gainesville, Texas, U.S. 33.6188°N 97.1660°W
- Campus: Rural, 110 acres (45 ha) main campus
- Colors: Blue and white
- Sporting affiliations: NJCAA – NTJCAC
- Mascot: Lions
- Website: www.nctc.edu

North Central Texas College (NCTC) is a public community college in Gainesville, Texas. It serves Cooke County, Denton County, and Montague County, Texas.

== History ==
As with many of the early community colleges, NCTC began as an extension of the local school district. In NCTC's case, a branch of the Gainesville Independent School District known as Gainesville Junior College was proposed by Superintendent Randolph Lee Clark, who previously started a junior college that later became Midwestern State University. The Gainesville college was established May 20, 1924, and held its first classes in the fall of that year.

For the first 22 years of the school's existence, it shared the same building with Gainesville High School, also sharing teachers and administrators (not until 1957 were separate teachers hired for the college). In 1946 a building located next to the high school was purchased and the college had its own building.

However, by the mid-1950s the college grew to the point that sharing space with the high school was no longer practical. Local citizens passed a bond issue to build separate facilities for the college. However, discussions took place as to whether a separate entity, apart from the Gainesville ISD, should be created (including assessment of a property tax to support it). With the support of citizens such as W.T. Bonner (who donated the first 5 acres (20,000 m^{2}) of the current campus and later sold 45 acres (180,000 m^{2}) more to the college), Cooke County voters approved the creation of the new district, and Gainesville Junior College became Cooke County Junior College (the Junior was later dropped in the 1970s). In 1994, the institution's name was changed to North Central Texas College to reflect its increasing instructional offerings in two Denton County cities—Lewisville and Denton.

During this time, NCTC operated under a "gentlemen's agreement" with the other junior colleges, and thus no separate schools were formed in neighboring Denton and Montague Counties.

In 1992, president Ronnie Glasscock led the school to two major accomplishments. First, the "gentlemen's agreement" was codified into state law (however, neither Denton nor Montague are included in NCTC's tax base). Second, Glasscock lobbied for a name change, realizing that Cooke County College would handicap the college's effort to be a true regionally focused college. He was successful, and on June 1, 1994, the Regents voted to change the college's name to its current designation.

In January 2000, NCTC opened a branch campus in Bowie (to serve Montague County). The citizens of Bowie voted a 1/2 cent sales tax increase to build the 16,000-square-foot (1,500 m^{2}), $2.196 million facility. NCTC also opened the Corinth campus (to serve Denton County) at the same time.

A historical marker outside the Administration Building claims that NCTC is the oldest continuously operating public community college in Texas, having been approved for operations in May 1924. This is based on the fact that several junior colleges which predate NCTC in terms of its opening either ceased operations (temporarily or permanently), were not founded as public institutions, or later became four-year colleges.

- Stephenville College started in 1893 as a private institution, and became a public college in 1898. However, financial troubles led to its buyout by Texas A&M in 1917, and it ultimately became Tarleton State University.
- Decatur Baptist College started in 1898. It moved to Dallas in 1965 and became Dallas Baptist University.
- El Paso Junior College (no relation to the current El Paso Community College) opened in 1920. It ultimately became the University of Texas at El Paso.
- Wichita Falls Junior College, which also has historical ties to Randolph Clark, opened in 1922. It ultimately became Midwestern State University.
- South Park Junior College opened in 1923. It ultimately became Lamar University.
- Four junior colleges (Carr-Burdette College in Sherman, Clifton College in Clifton, Gunter College in Gunter, and Wesley College in Greenville), all of which opened prior to NCTC, permanently ceased operations.
- Weatherford College in Weatherford dates its history back to 1869, and can claim the title of oldest two-year college in Texas. However, it began as a Masonic institution and later became a Methodist school, operating as a four-year institution until 1921 when it reorganized as a two-year college. Even so, it was operated as a private institution until 1949 when Parker County took over operations.
- Hill College opened in 1923, and has always operated as a public two-year college. However, Hill College ceased operations in July 1950 (though it never lost its charter to operate) and eventually re-opened in September 1962.
- Jacksonville College in Jacksonville, Texas, opened in 1899 and has operated continuously since that time. However, like Weatherford College, it operated as a four-year college until 1918 when it reorganized as a two-year college. Also, Jacksonville College has never been a public institution, having been owned and operated by a Baptist denomination or organization since its founding.

== Campuses ==
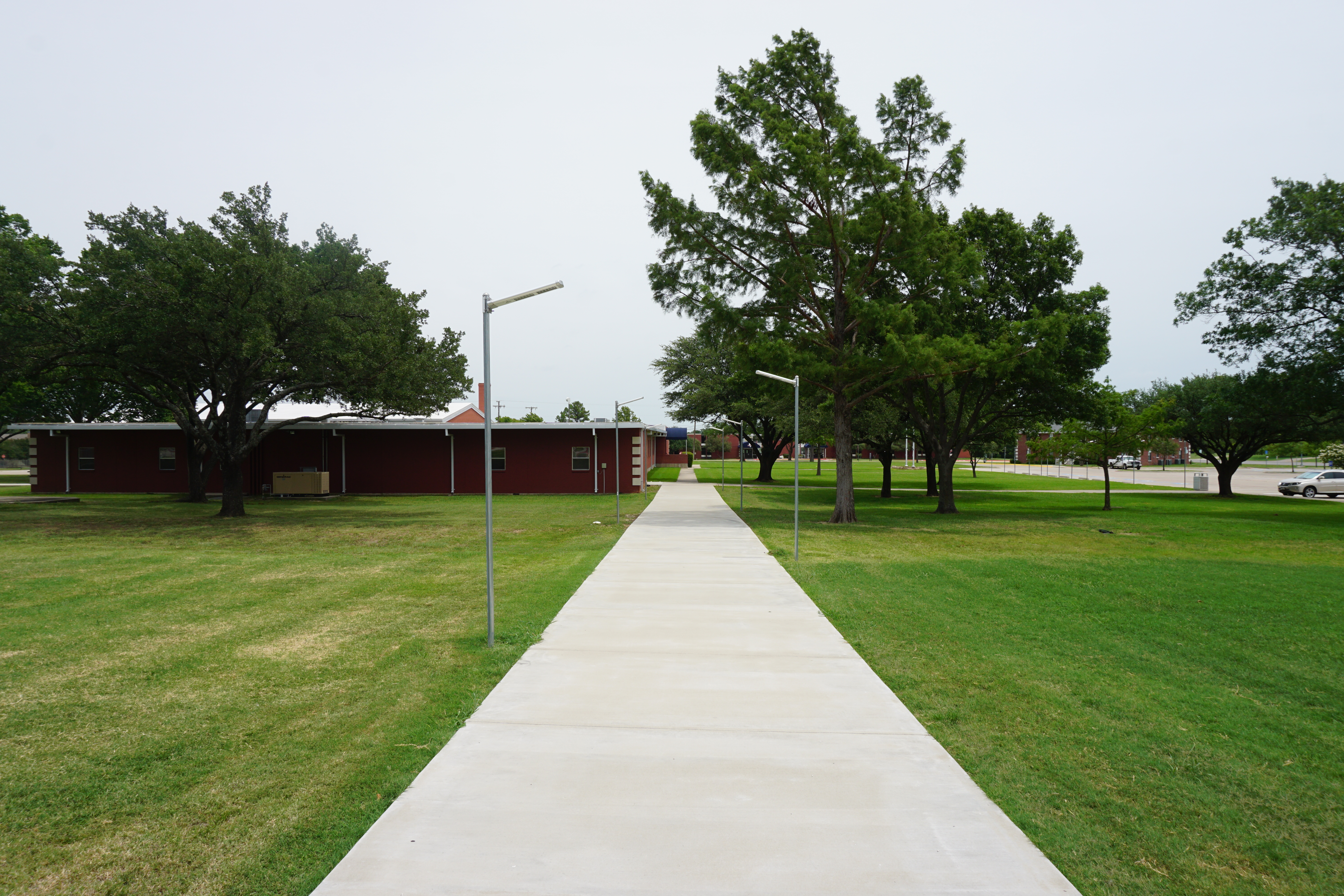
Gainesville campus

The original location, the Cooke County Campus, is in Gainesville and is the main campus. NCTC maintains full-service campuses in Corinth and Bowie, with branch campuses in Denton, Flower Mound, and Graham.

== Organization and administration ==
The current chancellor of NCTC is Dr. Brent Wallace. Dr. Wallace previously served as the vice-president of Instruction.

As defined by the Texas Legislature, the official service area of NCTC consists of the following:

- all of Cooke and Montague counties,
- all of Denton County excluding the cities of Frisco and The Colony, and also excluding those portions of the county included within the Carrollton-Farmers Branch, Celina, and Prosper school districts, and
- the section of Graham Independent School District located within Young County.

== Student life ==
=== Sports ===
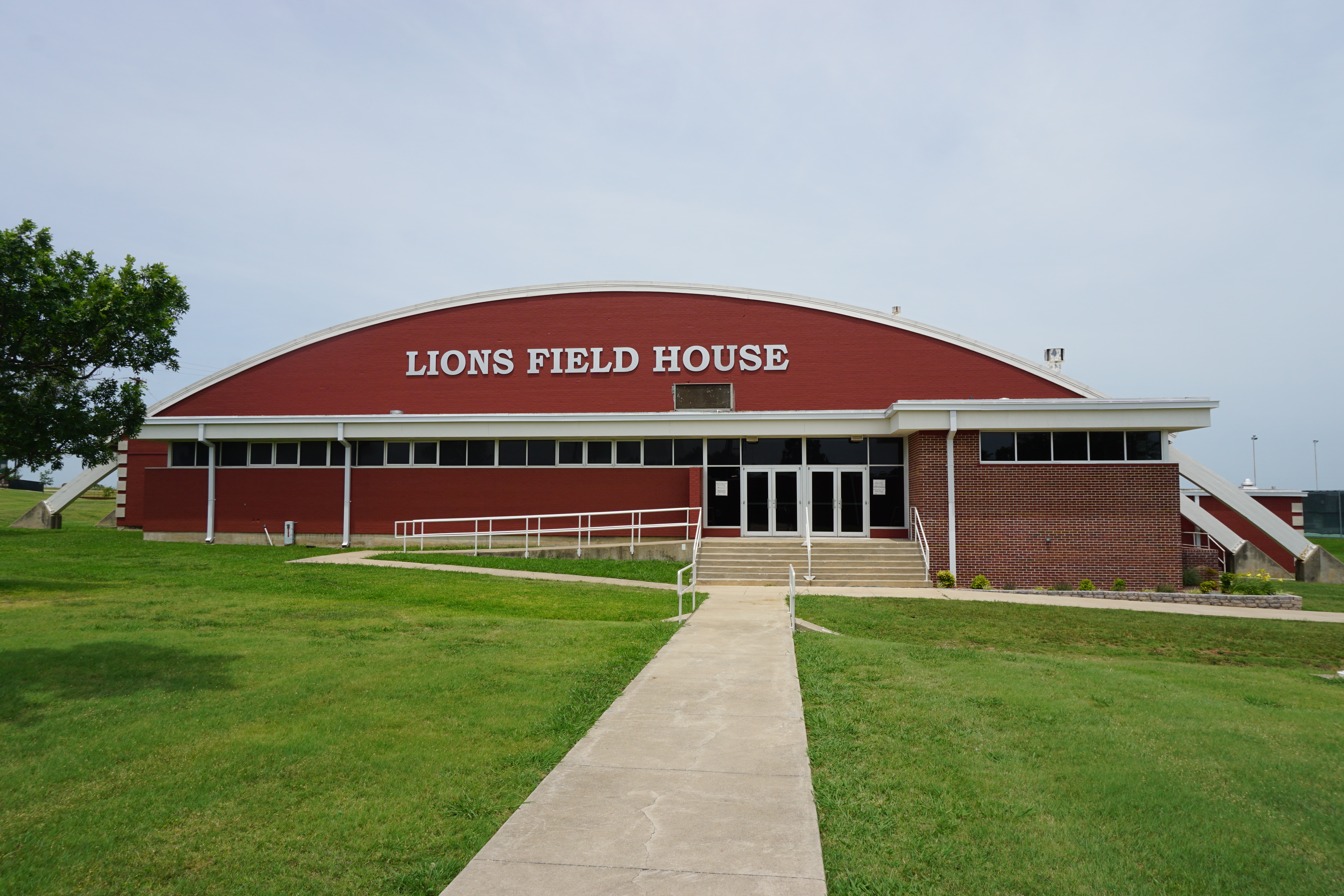
Lions Field House on the Gainesville campus

The college athletics teams are nicknamed the Lions. The lions compete in the North Texas Junior College Athletic Conference of the NJCAA. North Texas Central College offers athletic scholarships in baseball, softball, volleyball, and women's tennis.

==== Bus accident ====
On September 26, 2014, four members of the North Central Texas College Lions women's softball team died, and 15 others suffered injuries, when the bus in which they were passengers was struck by a tractor-trailer near Davis, Oklahoma. The four players who died were Brooke Deckard, Jaiden Pelton, Meagan Richardson, and Katelynn Woodlee. Three of the players died at the scene; the fourth at a hospital.

According to Oklahoma Highway Patrol Capt. Ronnie Hampton, the tractor-trailer crossed the median into the southbound lane on Highway 35, and both the bus driver, who is also the coach, and the driver of the tractor-trailer underwent toxicology tests, and the incident was treated as a homicide.

== Notable people ==
- Dennis Rodman, Hall of Fame NBA basketball player
- J. R. Towles, former baseball catcher for the Houston Astros
