= Western Junior College Athletic Conference =

Junior college athletic conference in the US Southwest

- Association: NJCAA
- Founded: 1972; 54 years ago
- Sports fielded: 20; men's: 10; women's: 10
- Division: Region 5
- No. of teams: 17
- Headquarters: Austin, Texas
- Region: Southwest

The Western Junior College Athletic Conference (WJCAC) is a junior college athletic conference for many technical and community colleges within the Southwest states of Texas and New Mexico, sponsored by the National Junior College Athletic Association (NJCAA). Conference championships are held in most sports and individuals can be named to All-Conference and All-Academic teams. It is part of NJCAA Region 5.

== Member schools ==
=== Current members ===
The WTJCAC currently has 12 full members, all are public schools:

Institution	Location	Founded	Type	Enrollment	Nickname	Joined
Amarillo College	Amarillo, Texas	1929	Public	11,675	Badgers	?
Clarendon College	Clarendon, Texas	1898	Public	1,135	Bulldogs	?
El Paso Community College	El Paso, Texas	1972	Public	24,642	Tejanos	?
Frank Phillips College	Borger, Texas	1948	Public	?	Plainsmen	?
Howard College	Big Spring, Texas	1945	Public	4,623	Hawks	?
Luna Community College	Las Vegas, New Mexico	1969	Public	?	Rough Riders	?
Midland College	Midland, Texas	1972	Public	7,425	Chaparrals	?
New Mexico Junior College	Hobbs, New Mexico	1965	Public	3,375	Thunderbirds	?
New Mexico Military Institute	Roswell, New Mexico	1891	Public	914	Broncos	?
Odessa College	Odessa, Texas	1946	Public	5,803	Wranglers	?
South Plains College	Levelland, Texas	1957	Public	9,900	Texans	?
Western Texas College	Snyder, Texas	1969	Public	3,164	Westerners	?

== See also ==
- National Junior College Athletic Association (NJCAA)
- North Texas Junior College Athletic Conference, also in Region 5
- Metro Athletic Conference, also in Region 5
