= Southwestern Christian College =

Private historically black college in Terrell, Texas, US

- Type: Private historically black college
- Established: 1948
- Religious affiliation: Churches of Christ
- President: Ervin D. Seamster, Jr.
- Students: 128
- Location: Terrell, Texas, United States; 32°44′7″N 96°17′9″W
- Nickname: Rams
- Sporting affiliations: NJCAA – NTJCAC
- Website: www.swcc.edu

Southwestern Christian College (SwCC) is a private Christian historically black college in Terrell, Texas, United States. It is affiliated with the Church of Christ.

== History ==
SwCC was founded in 1948 by the educator and minister G. P. Bowser under the name Southern Bible Institute in Fort Worth, Texas. The initial class consisted of 45 students.

School officials intended to buy property in Fort Worth to erect a permanent school plant. In the summer of 1949, the school had the opportunity to purchase the property of the closed Texas Military College in Terrell. It relocated to the campus that fall, changing the college's name. The first President was E.W. McMillan from 1950 to 1953, having H.L. Barber (1953–1956) and A.V. Isbell (1956–1967) succeeding him. The fourth president was Jack Evans Sr, the first black and longest-serving president in the school's history. His tenure was from 1967 to 2017. He was one of the longest-serving college presidents in the United States. The current president is Ervin D. Seamster Jr.

The campus includes two locally significant historic buildings:

- The first dwelling erected in Terrell, an octagonal-shaped house designed to provide better defense against Indian attacks. (Built by the first Terrell in town, it was called a "Round House.") The house was fitted with the first glass windows in Kaufman County, Texas. It is one of only 20 surviving Round Houses in the entire nation.
- the Administration Building, which originally housed all of the Texas Military College. It burned down in 2008. W.B. Toone built the house. His wife was born to a family who lived in the Terrell Round House.

SwCC became accredited by the Southern Association of Colleges and Schools in 1973. It is accredited to award associate and bachelor's degrees.

== Athletics ==
SwCC participates in the National Junior College Athletic Association (NJCAA) Region 5 as a Division I program.

SwCC participates in volleyball, basketball (men's and women's), and track (men's and women's). The school colors are blue and white and the school mascot is the ram.
