= El Paso Community College =

Public college of El Paso, Texas, US

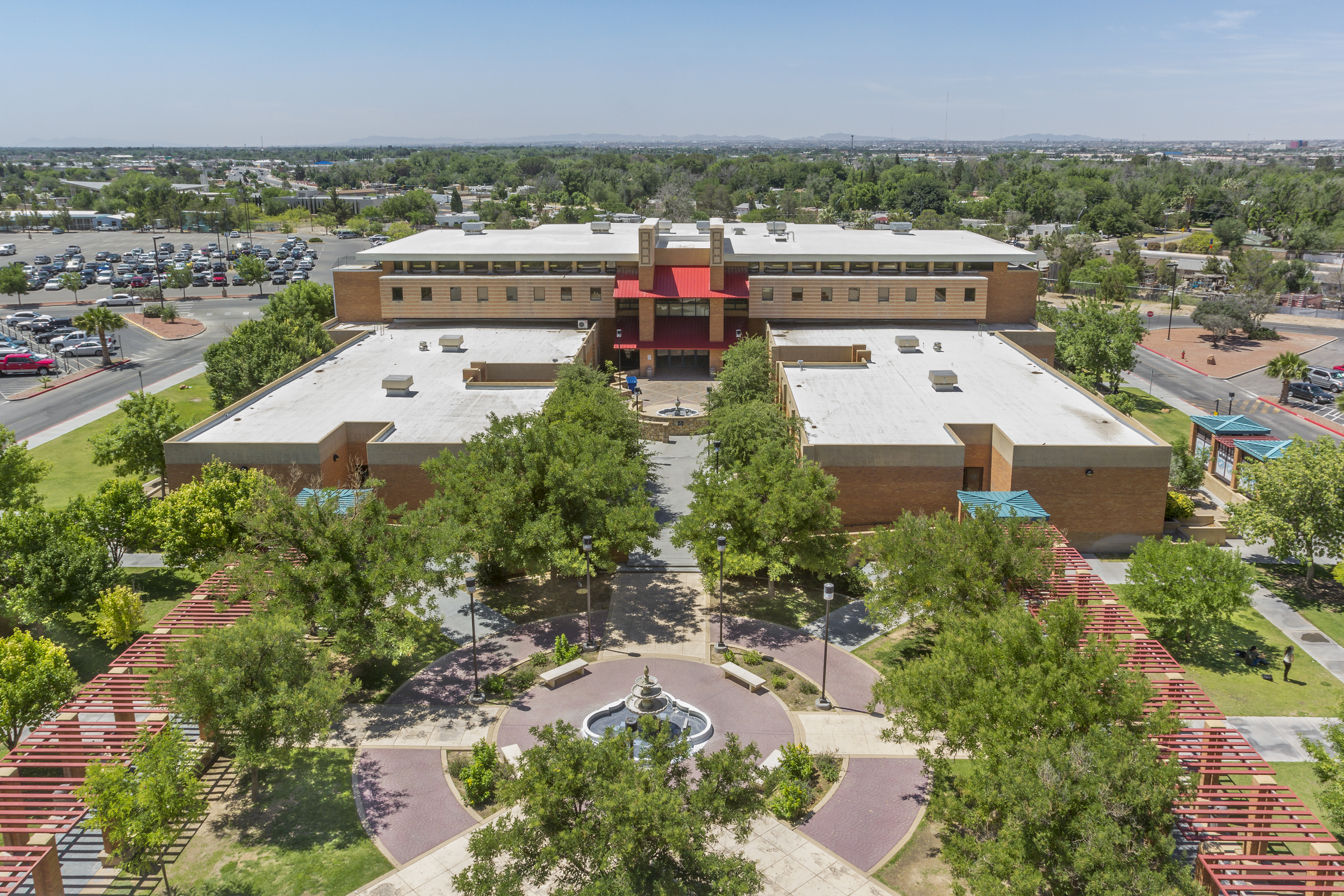
- Valle Verde campus
- Type: Public community college
- Established: 1972
- Academic affiliations: Southern Association of Colleges and Schools
- President: William Serrata
- Students: 24,963 (Fall 2023)
- Location: El Paso, Texas, U.S.
- Nicknames: Tejanos and Tejanas
- Mascot: Tejano Jack
- Website: www.epcc.edu

El Paso Community College (EPCC) is a community college in El Paso, Texas. EPCC operates five campuses in the El Paso area, as well as courses offered at nearby Fort Bliss.

As defined by the Texas Legislature, the official service area of EPCC is all of El Paso and Hudspeth counties in Texas.

== Athletics ==
El Paso Community College is a member of the National Junior College Athletic Association competing in Region V and the Western Junior College Athletic Conference. EPCC's sports teams are known as the Tejanos. They compete in baseball, softball, and cross country running.

== Campuses ==
- Mission del Paso Campus: east El Paso/Mission Valley 31.6763895°N 106.2644336°W
- Northwest Campus: northwest El Paso 31.8995096°N 106.5843919°W
- Rio Grande Campus: downtown El Paso 31.7639815°N 106.493907°W
- Transmountain Campus: northeast El Paso 31.8865797°N 106.4383427°W
- Valle Verde Campus: centrally located within the district, serves as EPCC's main campus 31.7516304°N 106.3693235°W

== Other locations ==
- Mission Early College High School—Socorro ISD 31.6790069°N 106.2653931°W
- Transmountain Early College High School—El Paso ISD 31.8843845°N 106.4383811°W
- Valle Verde Early College High School—Ysleta ISD 31.7531003°N 106.3660151°W
- Career Training Center—offers job training skills for displaced workers 31.7676345°N 106.4352588°W
- In addition, courses are offered at nearby Fort Bliss 31.8042007°N 106.4295255°W
