= Metro Athletic Conference =

College athletic conference in the United States

Metro Athletic Conference (a.k.a. Dallas Athletic Conference)
- Association: NJCAA
- Sports fielded: 8; men's: 5; women's: 3
- Division: Region 5
- No. of teams: 6
- Region: Dallas, Texas

The Metro Athletic Conference (also known as the Dallas Athletic Conference) is a junior college athletic conference within the National Junior College Athletic Association (NJCAA) Region 5. The conference consists of six junior colleges located in Dallas County, Texas.

== Sports ==
The Metro Athletic Conference consists of the sponsored sports:

- baseball
- men's basketball
- men's soccer
- women's soccer
- volleyball.

== Member schools ==
=== Current members ===
The Metro currently has six full members, all but two are public schools:

Institution	Location (Note: All cities are located within the State of Texas.)	Founded	Type	Enrollment	Nickname	Joined
Dallas College Brookhaven	Farmers Branch	1978	Public (Note: Part of the Dallas College System.)	11,000	Bears	?
Dallas College Cedar Valley	Lancaster	1977	Public	?	Suns	?
Dallas College Eastfield	Mesquite	1970	Public	14,214	Harvesters	?
Dallas College Mountain View	Dallas	1970	Public	?	Lions	?
Dallas College North Lake	Irving	1977	Public	10,570	Blazers	?
Dallas College Richland	Dallas	1972	Public	20,000	Thunderducks	?

== See also ==
- National Junior College Athletic Association (NJCAA)
- North Texas Junior College Athletic Conference, also in Region 5
- Western Junior College Athletic Conference, also in Region 5
