= Dallas College Eastfield =

Community college in Mesquite, Texas, US

Dallas College Eastfield Campus
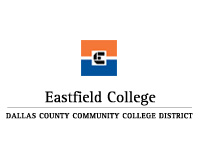
- Type: Public Community College
- Established: 1970
- Parent institution: Dallas College
- Chancellor: Dr. Justin H. Lonon
- President: Dr. Eddie Tealer
- Administrative staff: 388 (2016)
- Students: 18,000
- Location: Mesquite, Texas, United States; 32.815289°N 96.659691°W
- Campus: Urban
- Colours: Orange and blue
- Mascot: Harvesters
- Website: www.dallascollege.edu

Dallas College Eastfield Campus (Eastfield or EFC) is a public community college campus in Mesquite, Texas. It was founded in 1970 and has an enrollment of more than 14,000 students. It is part of Dallas College.

From 1981 until 2000, the Don Ellis Library and Collection, which included his instruments and Grammy for the film The French Connection, was housed at Eastfield.

== Athletics ==
Dallas College Eastfield Campus Harvesters compete within the Dallas Athletic Conference, a National Junior College Athletic Association Division III non-scholarship conference. Sports at Dallas College Eastfield Campus include men's basketball, baseball, women's volleyball, and women's soccer. The basketball team won the NJCAA DIII National Championship in 1997. The volleyball team won the NJCAA DIII National Championship in 2024, 2023, and 2017. The baseball team won the NJCAA DIII National Championship in 2001, 2006, and 2011.

== Notable alumni ==
- Cindy Burkett, Republican member of the Texas House of Representatives from District 113 in Dallas County
- Ana-Maria Ramos, Democratic member of the Texas House of Representatives from District 102 in Dallas County
