= Dallas College North Lake =

Community college in Irving, Texas, US

Coordinates: 32.871°N 96.967°W

Dallas College North Lake Campus
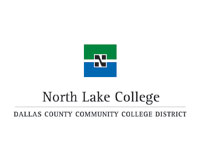
- Type: Public community college
- Established: 1977
- Parent institution: Dallas College
- Chancellor: Justin H. Lonon
- President: Rick Smith
- Faculty: 150
- Students: 10,570
- Location: Irving, Texas, U.S.
- Campus: Suburban, 276 acres (112 ha)
- Colors: Blue and green
- Nickname: Blazers
- Sporting affiliations: Metro Athletic Conference
- Mascot: Blaze
- Website: dallascollege.edu

Dallas College North Lake Campus (often referred to as North Lake or NLC) is a public community college in Irving, Texas. It is part of Dallas College. It opened in 1977 and enrolls about 5,000 credit students and an additional 3,000 continuing education students.

== Campus ==
In 2005 the college purchased a 35.8-acre (14.5 ha) tract of land in Coppell, Texas as the site of a satellite campus, which opened in 2008 as North Lake - North Campus. The North Campus location in far northwestern Dallas County pulls students not only from Dallas County, but also from neighboring Tarrant County and Denton County. The North Campus is also home to the college's logistics technology program.

North Lake - South Campus was opened in fall 2009 and is located on the northeast corner of Shady Grove and MacArthur Boulevard in Irving, with the primary purpose of providing educational opportunities for those in need of basic academic skills, language acquisition, and job competencies in the under-served areas of South Irving.

In 2019 the Dallas Independent School District (DISD) opened North Lake Early College High School, which has a campus for students in grades 9–10 at North Lake South and will have a grade 11-12 campus at North Lake North. The school is not within DISD's boundaries but DISD is allowed to operate it as such under Texas law.

== Athletics ==
The Dallas College North Lake Campus Blazers compete within the Metro Athletic Conference, a National Junior College Athletic Association Division III non-scholarship conference. Sports at North Lake include men's basketball, baseball, and women's soccer and volleyball.

In 2006, the North Lake Campus men's basketball team defeated Rowan College of South Jersey (located in Sewell, New Jersey) team to claim the 2006 National Junior College Athletic Association (NJCAA) Division III Championship. The NL men's team won the NJCAA Men's Division III Basketball Championship in 2008 and 2017.
