= North Texas Junior College Athletic Conference =

Junior college athletic conference

- Association: NJCAA
- Division: Region 5
- No. of teams: 11
- Region: North Texas

The North Texas Junior College Athletic Conference (NTJCAC) is a junior college athletic conference for many technical and community colleges in the state of Texas, sponsored by the National Junior College Athletic Association (NJCAA). Conference championships are held in most sports and individuals can be named to All-Conference and All-Academic teams. It is part of NJCAA Region 5.

== Member schools ==
=== Current members ===
The NTJCAC currently has 11 full members, all but one are public schools:

Institution	Location (Note: All cities are located within the State of Texas.)	Founded	Type	Enrollment	Nickname	Joined
Cisco College	Cisco	1939	Public	4,800	Wranglers	?
Collin College	McKinney	1985	Public	58,383	Cougars	?
Grayson College	Denison	1965	Public	5,000	Vikings	?
Hill College	Hillsboro	1962	Public	4,038	Rebels	?
McLennan Community College	Waco	1965	Public	8,900	Highlanders	?
North Central Texas College	Gainesville	1924	Public	7,360	Lions	?
Ranger College	Ranger	1926	Public	2,303	Rangers	?
Southwestern Christian College	Terrell	1948	Churches of Christ (Note: Also a historically black junior college.)	?	Rams	?
Temple College	Temple	1926	Public	5,288	Leopards	?
Vernon College	Vernon	1972	Public	3,167	Chaparrals	?
Weatherford College	Weatherford	1869	Public	6,000	Coyotes	?

== See also ==
- Western Junior College Athletic Conference, also in Region 5
- Metro Athletic Conference, also in Region 5
