= Collin College =

Community college system in Texas, U.S.

Coordinates: 33.2185°N 96.6419°W

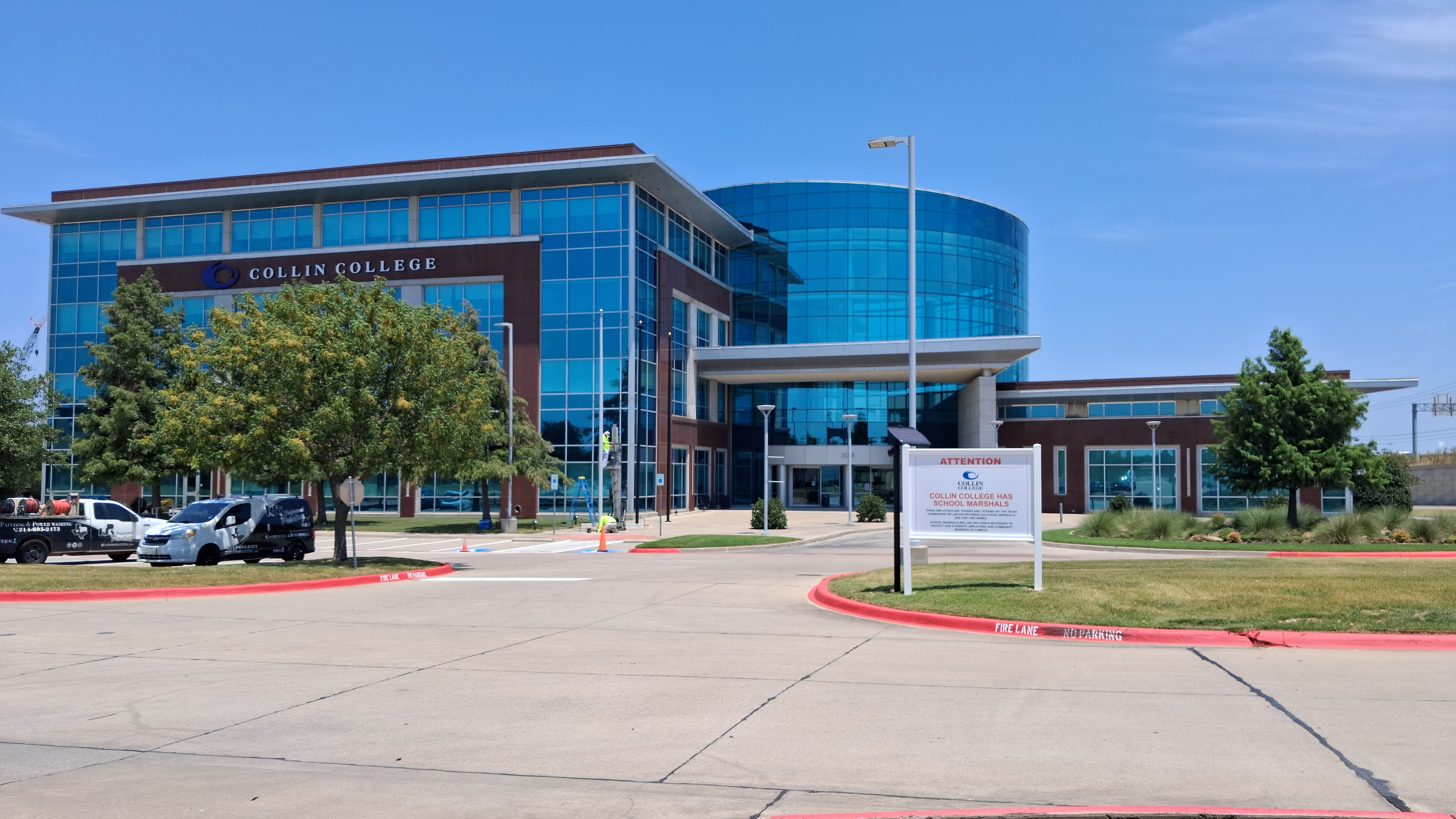
- Former name: Collin County Community College (1985–2007)
- Motto: "We have a passion for: Learning, Service and Involvement, Creativity and Innovation, Academic Excellence, Dignity and Respect, and Integrity"
- Type: Public community college district
- Established: 1985
- President: Neil Matkin
- Faculty: 1,565 full-time and 1,343 part-time (2023)
- Students: 60,679 (2024)
- Location: Collin County, Texas, United States
- Sporting affiliations: NJCAA – NTJCAC
- Mascot: Cougar
- Website: www.collin.edu

Collin College is a public community college district in Collin County, Texas, United States. Established in 1985, the district has grown as the county has grown from around 5,000 students in 1986 to more than 60,000 credit and noncredit students. Formerly known as the Collin County Community College District, CCCCD, or CCCC, the college rebranded itself "Collin College" in March 2007. The district headquarters is in the Collin Higher Education Center in McKinney.

As defined by the Texas Legislature, the official service area of Collin College includes all of Collin County and Rockwall County and the portions of Denton County within the cities of Frisco and The Colony and the portions included within the Celina and Prosper school districts. The college is governed by nine elected trustees.

== Campuses ==
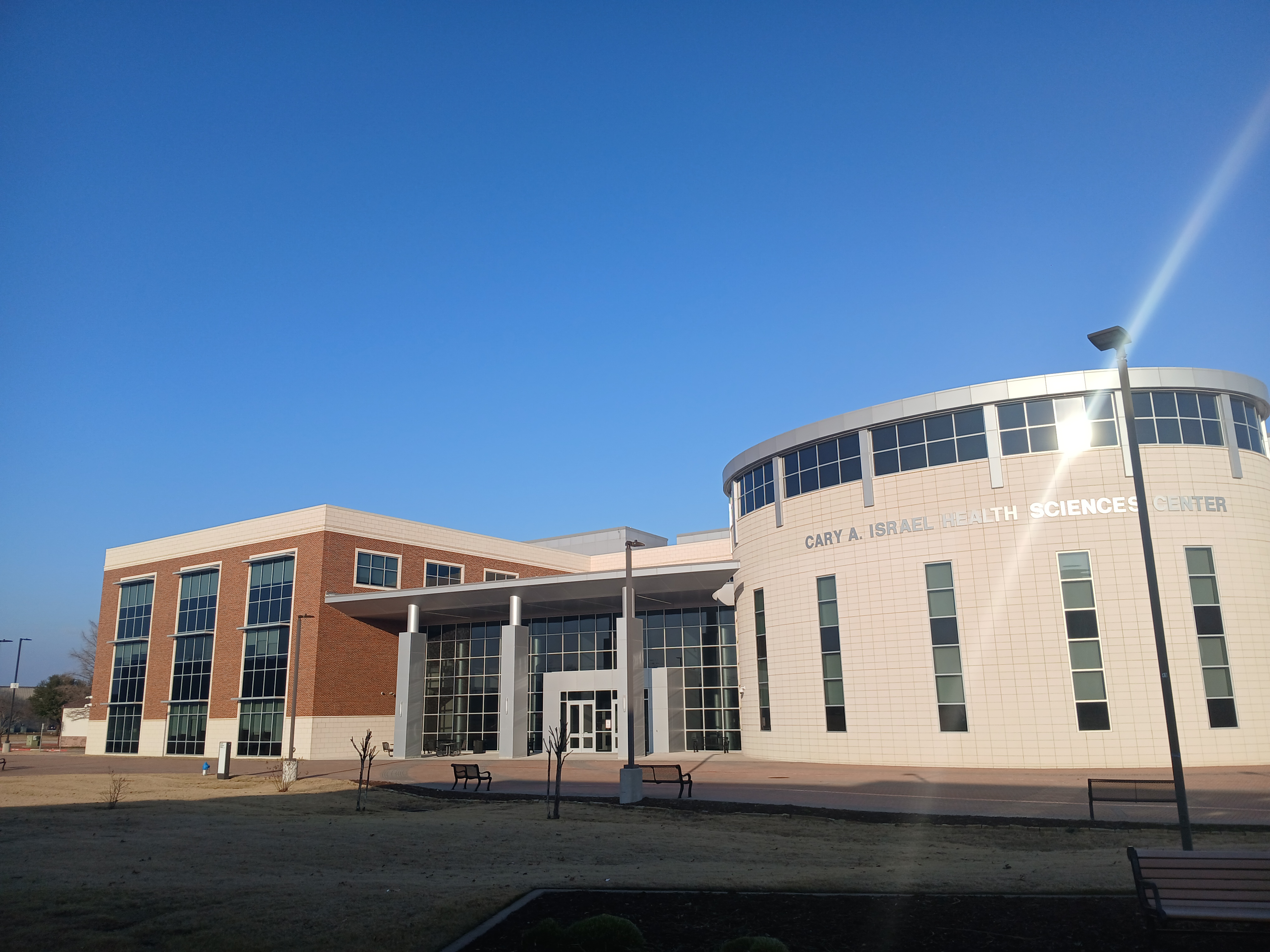
Cary A. Israel Health Sciences Center at the McKinney Campus

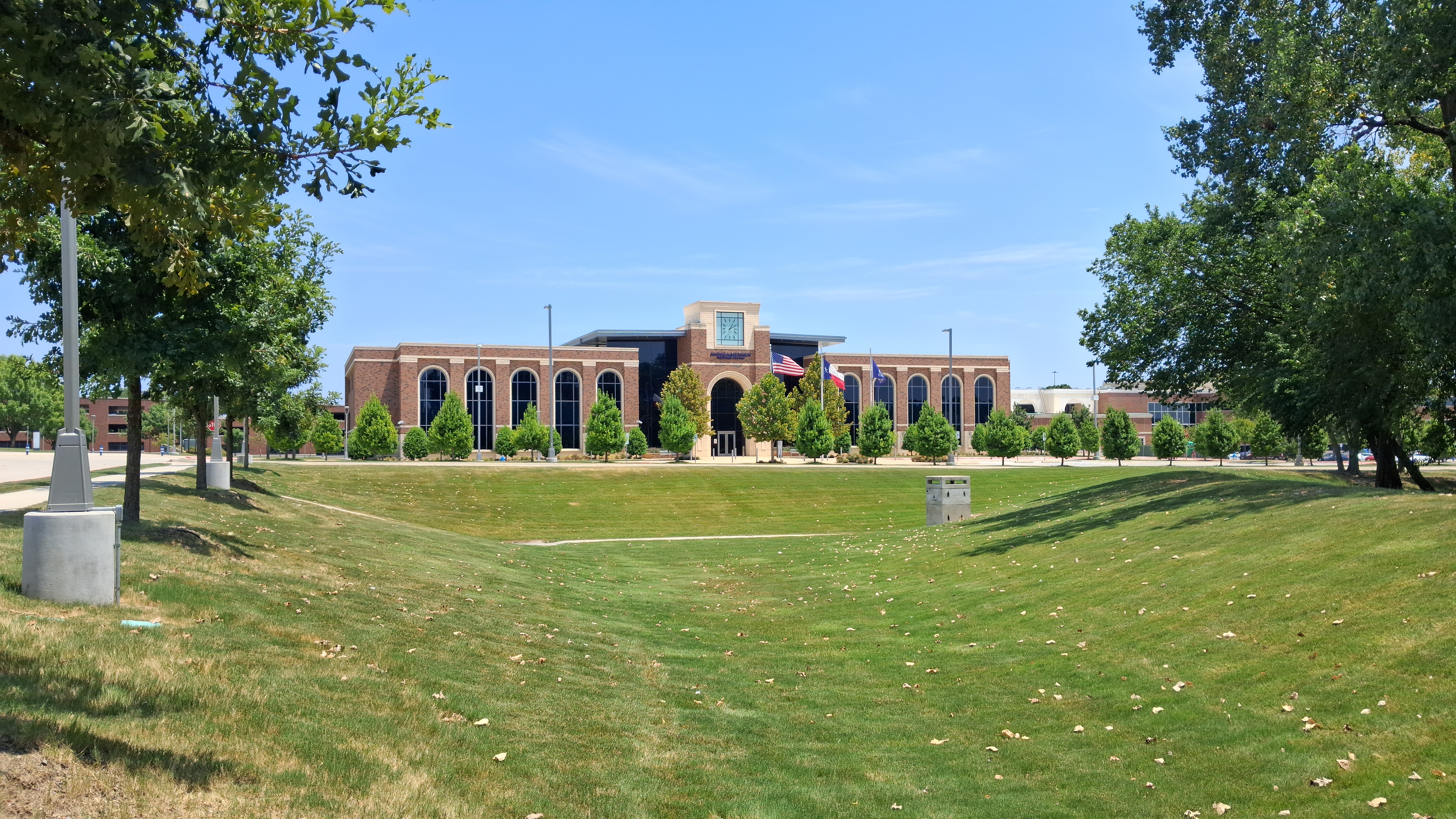
McKinney Campus

The McKinney Campus (also known as Central Park Campus) opened in 1985. The campus features include a multistory parking garage, library, classrooms, offices, and a student development center. The campus library totals 73,500 square feet (6,830 m^{2}). In January 2016, Collin College added a 125,000-square-foot state-of-the-art Health Sciences Center named after former Collin College district president Cary A. Israel.

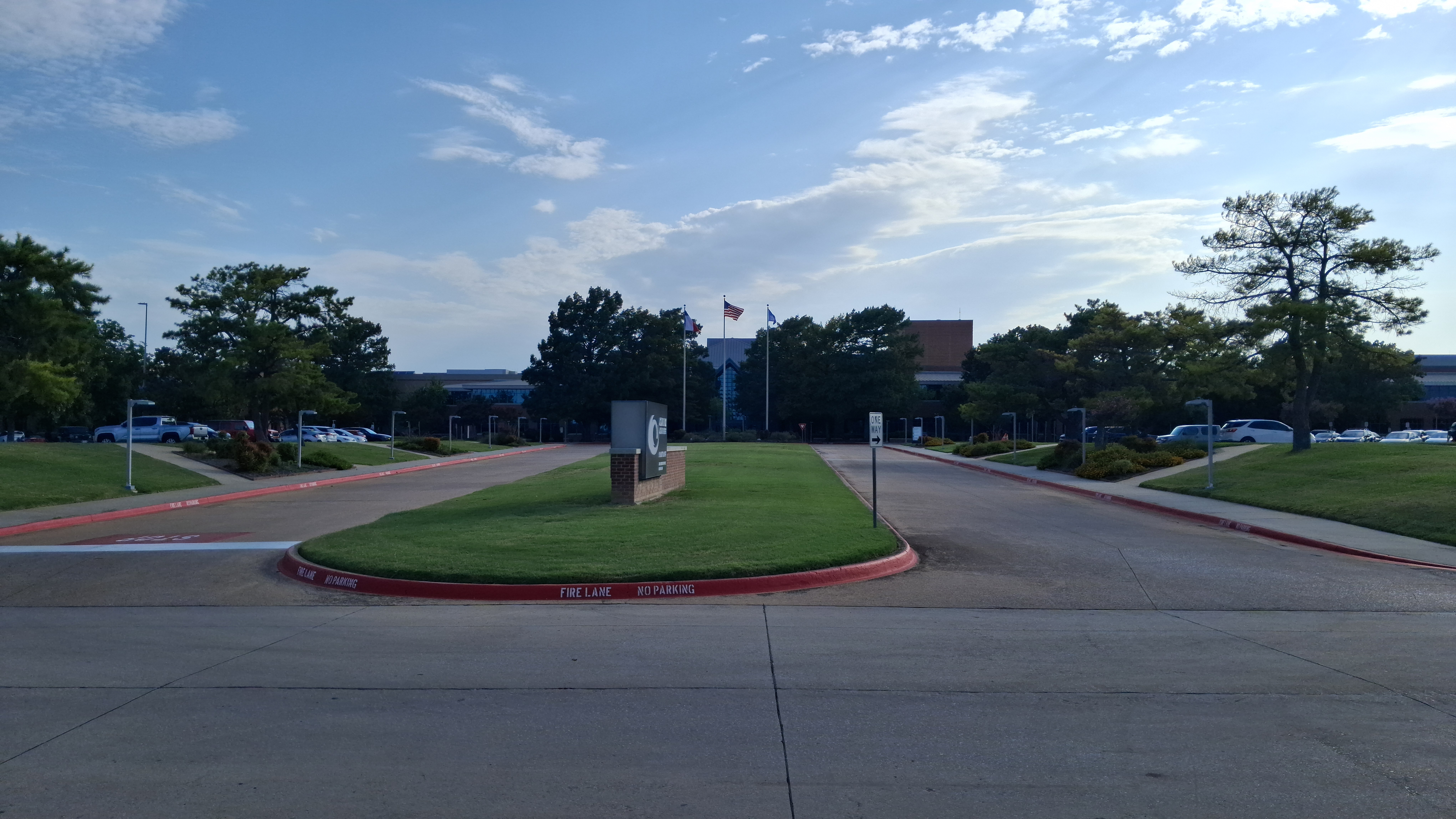
Plano Campus

The Plano Campus (also known as Spring Creek Campus) opened in fall of 1988. By number of students, this campus is the largest and hosts the college district's fine arts and athletics programs. The campus features a 30,000-square-foot (2,800 m^{2}) art gallery, theatre center, gymnasium (Cougar Hall), and tennis facilities. In January 2013, the college opened an 88,000-square-foot library building with majestic architecture inspired by Thomas Jefferson's design for the University of Virginia.

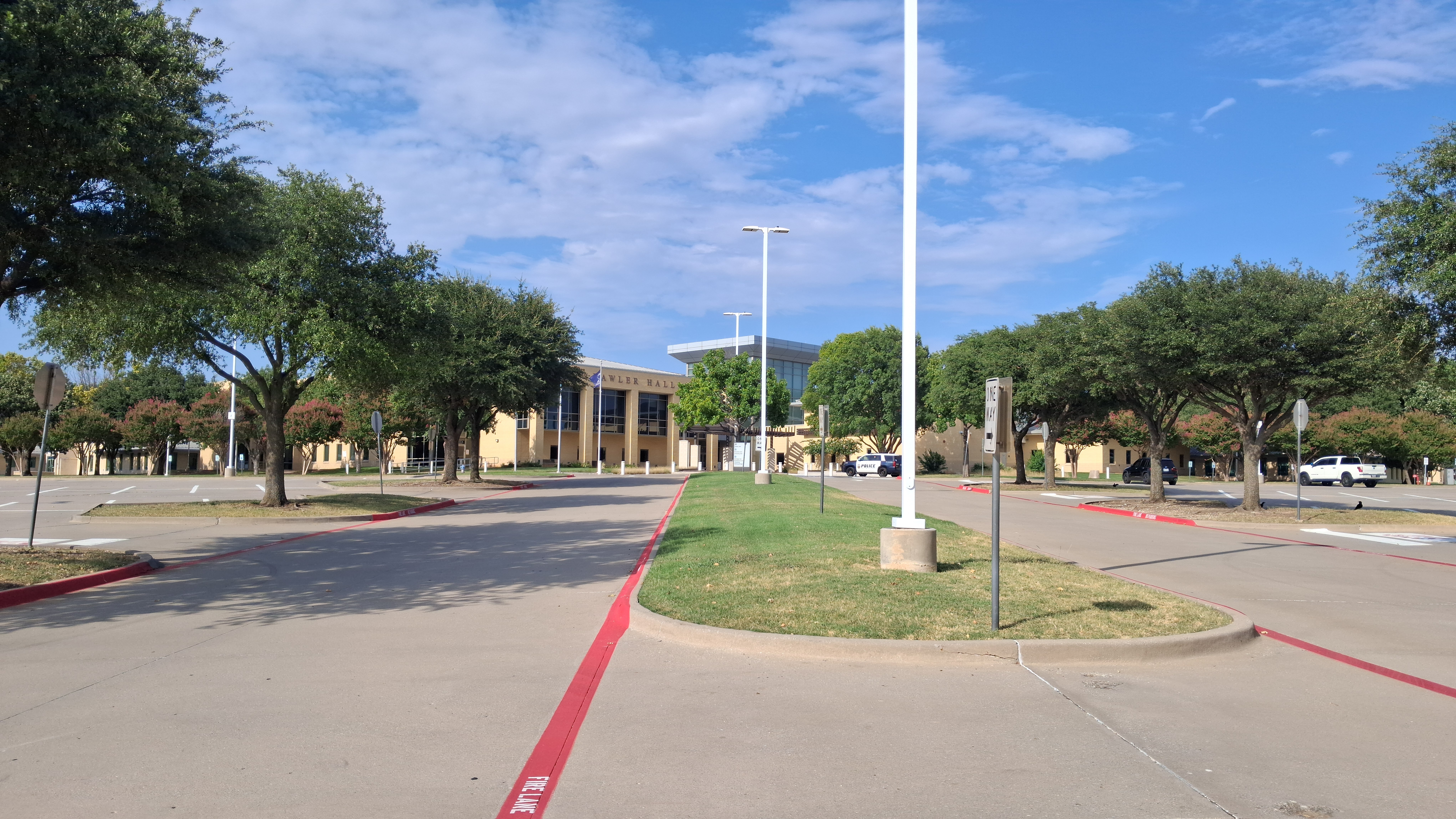
Frisco Campus

The Frisco Campus (also known as Preston Ridge Campus) opened in July 1995. In 2014, thanks to a $2 million gift for scholarships by Roger and Jody Lawler of Frisco, the campus renamed their 70,000-square-foot (6,500 m^{2}) building from "D Building" to "Lawler Hall" in honor of the donation. Collin College's business and high-tech programs are centered at Frisco Campus. The culinary arts program moved there in 2009.

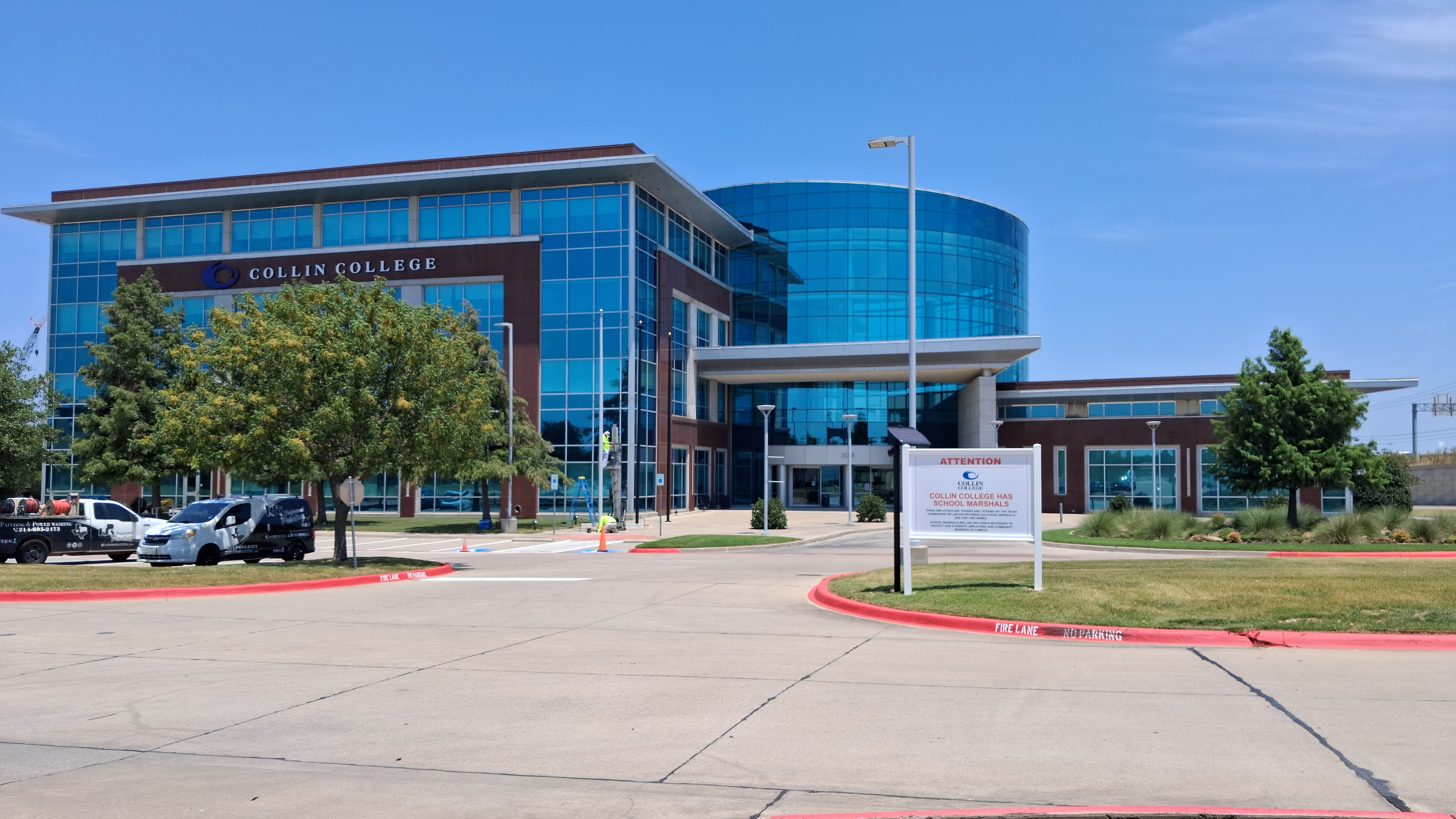
Collin Higher Education Center

The district administration is located in the Collin Higher Education Center (CHEC) in McKinney. The CHEC hosts – among other things – a number of bachelor's, master's and doctoral programs from five North Texas universities: East Texas A&M University, Texas Woman's University, the University of Texas at Dallas, Texas Tech University, and the University of North Texas. Offerings vary per university. The center is located at the intersection of the Central Expressway (U.S. Route 75) and Texas State Highway 121.

The Public Safety Training Center (PSTC) in McKinney provides reality-based training for law enforcement and firefighter cadets and active first responders. Training elements include law enforcement and firefighter training areas with simulated retail spaces, office buildings, and living areas for reality-based scenario training, three firearms ranges, specialized gas-fired burn structures, a confined-space rescue simulator, and other training obstacles. The facility, which was built in partnership with the cities of McKinney and Allen, opened in September 2018.

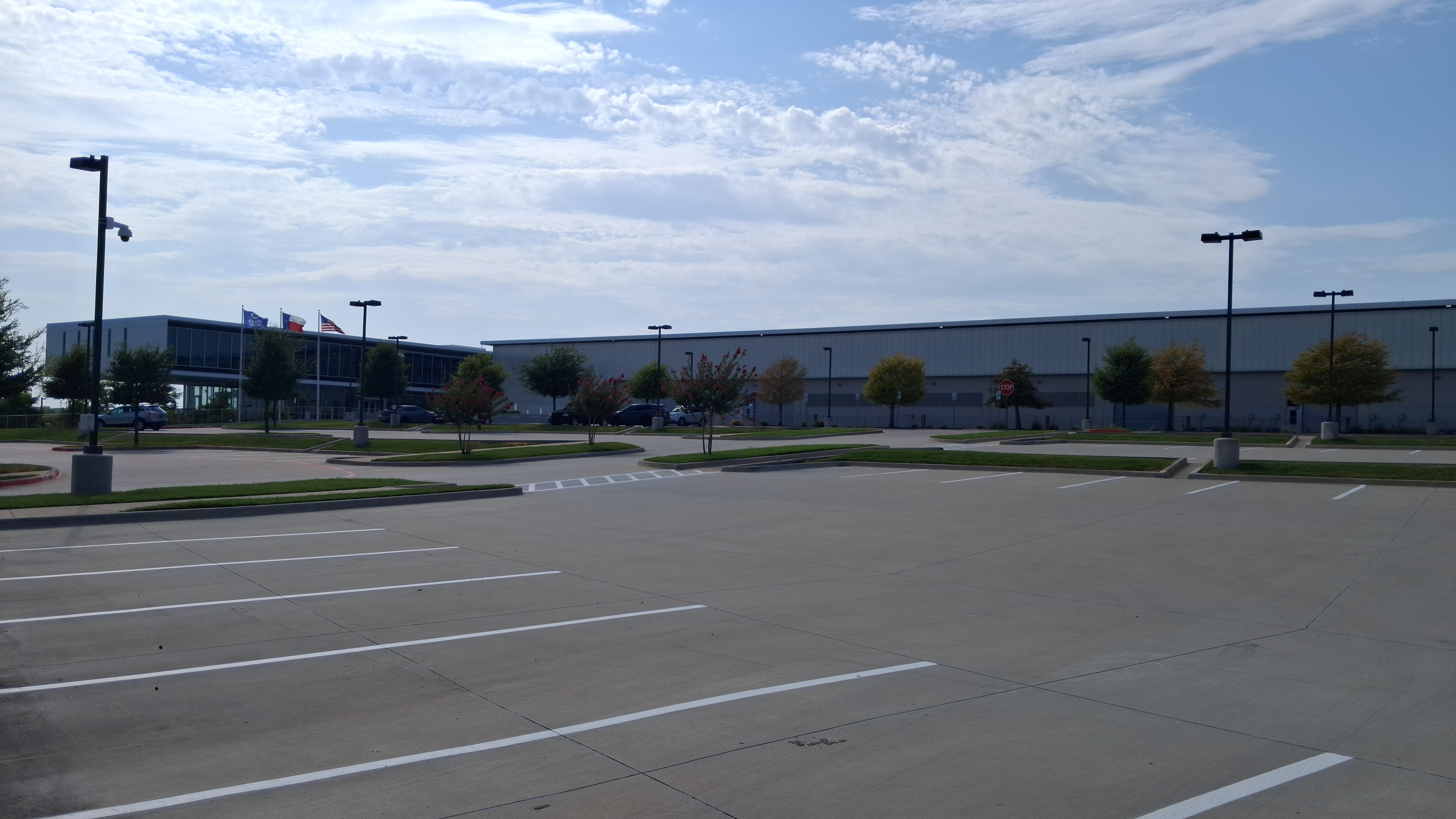
Allen Technical Campus

The Technical Campus, located in Allen, opened in the fall of 2020.

The Wylie Campus also opened in the fall of 2020. Designed to support 7,500 students at capacity, the campus's opening allowed for the expansion of the college's veterinary medicine program. The campus was built in cooperation with the city of Wylie, which donated about 44 acres across the street from the city's municipal complex toward the project.

Farmersville Campus opened in March 2021. The first building, a roughly 52,000-square-foot facility, is designed to accommodate 1,250 learners.

Celina Campus opened in the fall of 2021. The first phase of the campus is 96,000 square feet and support up to 2,500 students.

The following is a list of the college district's current and planned campuses.

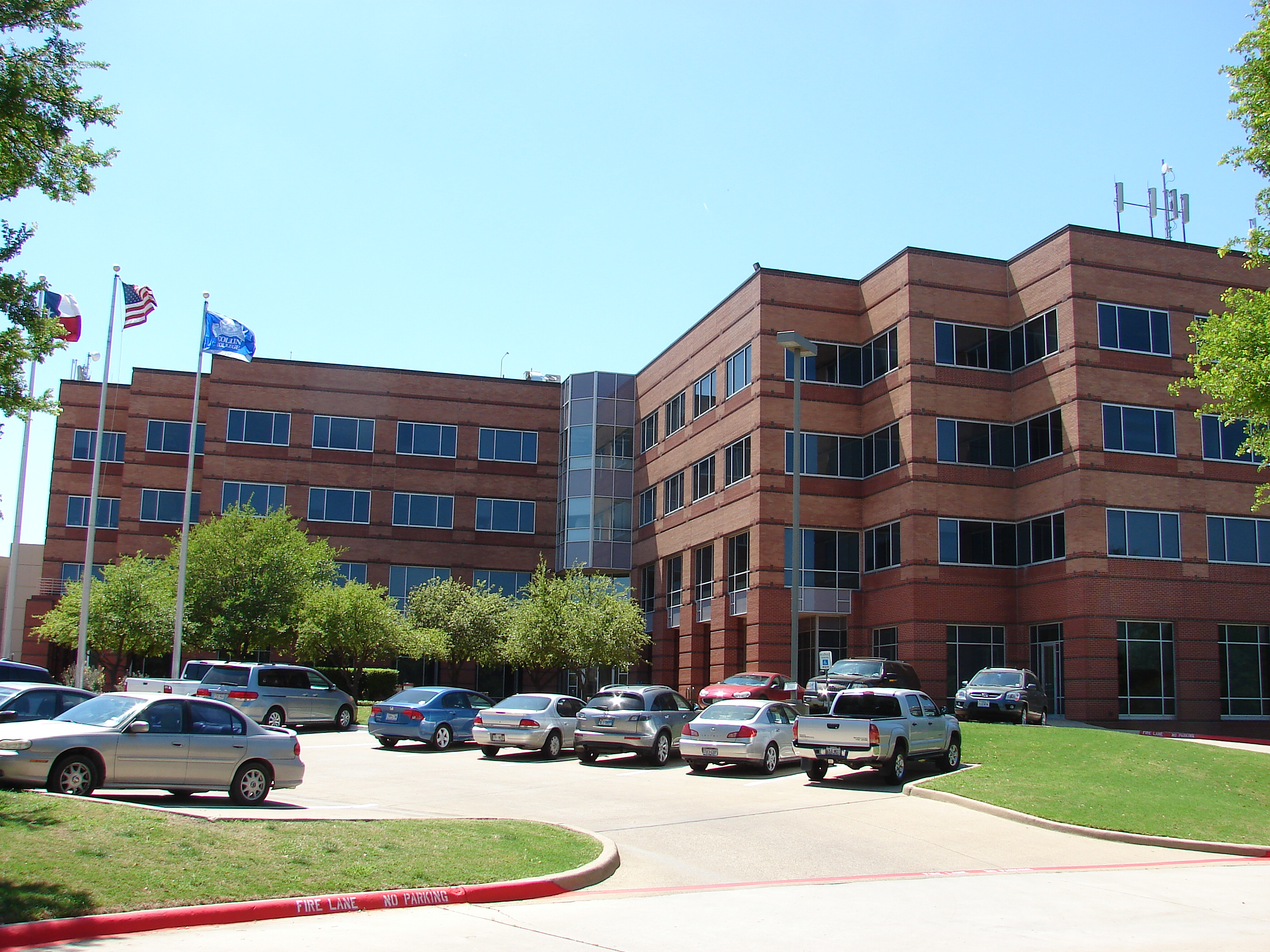
Courtyard Center campus

- Celina Campus
- Collin College Technical Campus (Allen)
- Collin Higher Education Center (McKinney)
- Courtyard Center (Plano)
- Farmersville Campus
- Frisco Campus (Preston Ridge Campus)
- McKinney Campus (Central Park Campus)
- Public Safety Training Center (McKinney)
- Plano Campus (Spring Creek Campus)
- Wylie Campus

=== 2017 bond program and current master plan ===
The residents of Collin County approved a $600 million bond proposition in May 2017 to fund the college district's master plan. Master plan projects funded by the bond included the Technical Campus, the Wylie Campus, the Public Safety Training Center in McKinney, and safety upgrades to existing campuses. Outstanding projects funded by the bond include planned campuses in Celina and Farmersville, an information technology building at the Frisco Campus, welcome centers at the college's existing campuses, and other upgrades to improve student experiences throughout the district.

=== Coronavirus deaths ===
The effects of this pandemic have been blown utterly out of proportion across our nation and reported with unfortunate sensationalism and few facts regardless of which news outlet one tunes into. It has become political in a pivotal election year and frankly, it has made our jobs all the more difficult.

— Neil Matkin, President of Collin College

Collin College was repeatedly criticized for its lack of transparency regarding COVID-19 on campus and risks of in-person classes. College president Matkin overruled faculty concerns about virus protections in June 2020, stating the campus would remain open. In August 2020, he downplayed the virus, stating the national case count is "clearly inflated".

During that fall 2020 semester, a faculty member, a student, and a staff member each died of COVID-19. Iris Meda, a recently retired nurse, had begun teaching nursing assistant classes in August 2020. According to her family, she came in contact with a sick student in October and died in mid-November. The staff were informed of her death as an information item 22 paragraphs deep in an email titled "College Update & Happy Thanksgiving!" A student died of COVID-19 in October 2020, and a food-service employee infection led to the closure of the cafeteria, though faculty only learned about the infections informally. The school's services went virtual after classes ended for the semester on December 14. Services resumed in-person, in January, after the normal holiday break.

Later, in August 2021, dean of nursing Jane Leach also died from COVID-19.

=== Free speech controversy ===
On February 17, 2021, the Foundation for Individual Rights in Education (FIRE) named Collin College to its 10th annual list of the "10 Worst Colleges for Free Speech: 2021" list. FIRE cited Collin College president Neil Matkin's public condemnation of a tweet sent by history professor Lora Burnett from her personal account that was critical of then Vice President Mike Pence. FIRE also referenced the senior administration's overturning of recommended contract renewals of two faculty members, Audra Heaslip and Suzanne Jones. Both professors had publicly criticized Collin College's handling of COVID-19, and they were members of the Collin College chapter of the Texas Faculty Association, a non-bargaining union disliked by college administration. Collin College declined to renew Lora Burnett's teaching contract for the following year and later settled a lawsuit over her non-renewal for $70,000 and attorney's fees. Jones also sued the university in September 2021.

In January 2022, shortly after settling the lawsuit by Professor Burnett, Collin College fired history professor Michael Phillips following his suggestion that students in his classes consider wearing masks. College administration had previously warned Phillips and other faculty to refrain from recommending students wear masks. Phillips had served for 13 years as a professor at the college. Earlier in the academic year, Collin College had disciplined Professor Phillips for a Twitter post that revealed the college's gag rule banning even the suggestion that students wear masks. According to Professor Phillips, in 2017, President Matkin and other members of the administration admonished him and threatened his job following his campaign to press the city of Dallas to remove its Confederate monuments. On March 8, 2022, Phillips, in conjunction with FIRE, sued the college but lost the case in court.

Several Collin College employees have claimed that the college requires many employees to sign nondisclosure agreements, an unusual practice in higher education.

On April 24, 2023, the American Association of University Professors issued a report titled "Egregious Violations of Academic Freedom at Collin College." It documents the dismissals of Professors Lora Burnett, Suzanne Jones, and Michael Phillips and concludes that they were "compelled to find that general conditions for academic freedom at Collin College are severely degraded." In addition it placed Collin College on its list of censured institutions. In a statement, the college replied to the report, maintaining that "that tenure and academic freedom are not unqualified privileges that can be extorted by external groups for their own purposes."

== Academics ==
In addition to associate degree programs, the college has bachelor's degree programs in cybersecurity and nursing that were established in 2019. The college had worked with university partners to offer their bachelor's degrees at its Collin Higher Education Center. In 2021–22, the college conferred 26 bachelor's degrees, all of which were in nursing.

== Athletics ==
Collin College's athletic program offers scholarships in men and women's basketball, esports, golf, and tennis, as well as women's volleyball. All teams are known as the Cougars. They compete in the North Texas Junior College Athletic Conference in the NJCAA Region 5. Collin College Women's Basketball won NTJCAC conference championships in 2015, 2016, 2017, 2018, 2020, 2023, and 2024. The team participated in the NJCAA national tournament in 2023 and 2024.

The competition basketball gym and tennis facilities are located on the Plano Campus. Volleyball matches will be held at the Frisco Campus.

== Awards ==
In 2020, the college applied for and was classified among "community engaged" institutions. Collin College was one of three two-year institutions in the nation and one of 119 U.S. colleges and universities to receive the classification; only 11 institutions in Texas were awarded this distinction in 2015 and 2020 combined. That same year, the college was also named a center of excellence in nursing education by the National League for Nursing. The following year, the college's respiratory care program received the Distinguished Registered Respiratory Therapist Credentialing Success Award from the Commission on Accreditation for Respiratory Care for the eighth consecutive year. The college was named one of the best higher-education employers in the nation for the second year in a row, according to a survey by The Great Colleges to Work For® program.

== Notable faculty ==
- Levi Bryant – Continental philosopher, influential figure of the Speculative Realism and Object-Oriented Ontology movements.

== Notable alumni ==
- James Ortiz – puppet designer and actor
