= Southwest Junior College Conference =

- Association: NJCAA
- Founded: 1947
- Sports fielded: 18; men's: 10; women's: 8
- No. of teams: 22
- Headquarters: Austin, Texas
- Region: Eastern Texas and Southwestern Louisiana – NJCAA Region 14

Southwest Junior College Conference (SJCC), also known as Region XIV (or Region 14) is a junior college athletic conference governed by the National Junior College Athletic Association (NJCAA).

The Southwest Junior College Conference formed in 1947.

It should not be confused with the Southwest Junior College Football Conference, which includes schools from Oklahoma and New Mexico as well as Texas. Blinn, Kilgore, Navarro, Trinity Valley, and Tyler are members of both conferences.

== Member schools ==
=== Current members ===
The SWJCC currently has 18 full members, all but one are public schools:

Institution	Location	Founded	Affiliation	Enrollment	Nickname	Joined
Alvin Community College	Alvin, Texas	1948	Public	5,293	Dolphins	?
Angelina College	Lufkin, Texas	1966	Public	5,000	Roadrunners	?
Blinn College	Brenham, Texas	1884	Public	18,977	Buccaneers	?
Bossier Parish Community College	Bossier City, Louisiana	1966	Public (Note: Part of the Louisiana Community and Technical College System.)	5,727	Cavaliers	?
Coastal Bend College	Beeville, Texas	1965	Public	4,992	Cougars	?
Galveston College	Galveston, Texas	1967	Public	2,400	Whitecaps	?
Jacksonville College	Jacksonville, Texas	1899	Baptist	?	Jaguars	?
Kilgore College	Kilgore, Texas	1935	Public	5,000	Rangers	?
Lamar State College–Port Arthur	Port Arthur, Texas	1909	Public (Note: Part of the Texas State University System.)	2,740	Seahawks	?
Lee College	Baytown, Texas	1934	Public	7,790	Navigators	?
Navarro College	Corsicana, Texas	1946	Public	10,000	Bulldogs	?
Northeast Texas Community College	Mount Pleasant, Texas	1984	Public	?	Eagles	?
Panola College	Carthage, Texas	1947	Public	?	Ponies	?
Paris Junior College	Paris, Texas	1924	Public	5,000	Dragons	?
Trinity Valley Community College	Athens, Texas	1946	Public	7,743	Cardinals	?
Tyler Junior College	Tyler, Texas	1926	Public	12,500	Apaches	?
Victoria College	Victoria, Texas	1925	Public	6,200	Pirates	?
Wharton County Junior College	Wharton, Texas	1946	Public	5,892	Pioneers	?

=== Associate members ===
The SWJCC currently has the three campuses of San Jacinto College as associate members. In 2022, San Jacinto merged its athletics programs (San Jacinto College–Central Ravens, San Jacinto College–North Gators, San Jacinto College–South Coyotes). All are known as the Ravens.

Institution	Location	Founded	Affiliation	Enrollment	Nickname	Joined	SWJCC sport(s)
San Jacinto College	Pasadena, Texas	1961	Public	30,000	Ravens	?	men's basketball, women's volleyball (central campus) baseball, women's basketball (north campus) men's soccer, softball (south campus)

== Yearly football standings ==
1947 Southwestern Junior College Conference football standings
	Conf.					Overall
Team	W		L		T	W		L		T
Tyler $	7	–	0	–	0	10	–	1	–	0
Kilgore	6	–	1	–	0	9	–	1	–	0
San Angelo	5	–	2	–	0	9	–	3	–	0
North Texas Aggies	4	–	3	–	0	6	–	3	–	0
Schreiner	2	–	4	–	0	5	–	5	–	0
Lamar	2	–	5	–	0	4	–	6	–	0
Paris	1	–	5	–	0	3	–	7	–	0
John Tarleton	0	–	7	–	0	2	–	8	–	0
$ – Conference champion

1948 Southwestern Junior College Conference football standings
	Conf.					Overall
Team	W		L		T	W		L		T
Kilgore $	6	–	1	–	0	10	–	1	–	0
Paris	5	–	2	–	0	8	–	3	–	0
Tyler	5	–	2	–	0	7	–	3	–	0
San Angelo	5	–	2	–	0	6	–	4	–	0
Lamar	3	–	4	–	0	8	–	4	–	0
North Texas Aggies	3	–	4	–	0	4	–	5	–	0
John Tarleton	1	–	6	–	0	2	–	7	–	0
Schreiner	0	–	7	–	0	1	–	9	–	0
$ – Conference champion

1949 Southwestern Junior College Conference football standings
	Conf.					Overall
Team	W		L		T	W		L		T
Tyler +	6	–	1	–	0	11	–	1	–	0
Lamar +	6	–	1	–	0	9	–	2	–	0
Kilgore	5	–	2	–	0	8	–	2	–	0
San Angelo	4	–	3	–	0	5	–	3	–	1
Schreiner	3	–	4	–	0	5	–	6	–	0
Tarleton State	2	–	5	–	0	4	–	6	–	0
Paris	2	–	5	–	0	3	–	7	–	0
Arlington State	0	–	7	–	0	1	–	9	–	0
+ – Conference co-champions
