= Eagle Ford, Dallas =

Eagle Ford
- Interactive map of Eagle Ford
- Country: United States
- State: Texas
- County: Dallas
- City: Dallas
- Area: West Dallas
- Elevation: 413 ft (126 m)

Population (2000)
  - Total: 8,013
- ZIP code: 75212
- Area codes: 214, 469, 972

Ledbetter/Eagle Ford is a neighborhood in West Dallas, Texas, United States.

== Geography ==
Eagle Ford is located at 32°47′05″N 96°54′03″W (32.7848517, -96.9008376).

=== Adjacent areas ===
Ledbetter Neighborhood Association

- Ledbetter Gardens (east)
- Westmoreland Heights (east)
- Trinity River (north)
- City of Irving (northwest)
- City of Grand Prairie (west & southwest)
- Singleton Industrial Area (southeast)
- Oak Cliff (south)
- Turnpike Distribution Center (southeast)

== History ==
The Eagle Ford community developed just east of an important early crossing on the west fork of the Trinity River. The area was first settled by the family of Enoch Horton, who moved there from Missouri in November 1844. When Horton found an eagle's nest in the area, he named the crossing Eagle Ford. Soon after, several families from the nearby community of La Réunion settled in Eagle Ford. Enoch's son James built the Eagle Ford Grist Mill and donated land in 1857 for the Horton Cemetery. He also gave land for the Texas and Pacific Railway right-of-way and depot. In 1858, a post office opened in Eagle Ford and it remained in operation until 1866.

The community did not begin to develop until the depression of 1873 halted construction of the Texas and Pacific Railway, which made Eagle Ford its western terminus until 1876. It became a major cattle-shipping point between the larger cities of Dallas and Fort Worth. During that period, Eagle Ford grew into a community of several thousand people with a number of businesses. Another post office was secured and remained in operation until 1918. Construction on the Texas and Pacific resumed in 1876 and was completed to Fort Worth in 1878. The community declined as a cattle-shipping point, but evolved into an agricultural shipping point for the surrounding region. Eagle Ford's population hovered around 200 in 1882, but had decreased to fifty by the 1890s and remained at that level through the early twentieth century. In 1907, William Foster Cowham and Associates came to the area from Michigan and began buying property, including some of James Horton's original land holdings. They established the Southwestern States Portland Cement Company and built two villages in the area to house their employees, many of whom were Mexican immigrants. One first family arrived just after the arrival of the "second wave" of Mexican immigrants, The Martinez family who around1911, came to the Dallas area in order to flee the Mexican Revolution (1910-1912) (Rice; Nixon-Mendez). The "first wave" had arrived during the 1870s seeking jobs with the railroads, which required cheap labor, or in agriculture (Nixon-Mendez; Rice). The period of industrialization-1890-1910 saw more Mexicans arrive and the Mexican population beginning to take root (Rice). Earlier Mexican animal herders, Teamsters, and traders were reported crossing the area as early as 1850; they did not keep residence in the city, although they used it as a base of trade (Nixon-Mendez1993). Even earlier, in 1839 a group of merchants from Chihuahua, Mexico, in the company of 50 Mexican soldiers crossed North Texas. The route they established on return because a principal route for later Anglo-American explorers, pioneers, and merchants (Ibid). Mexican presence in the area likely occurred much earlier, given the fact that the Trinity River was "discovered" and named "La Sanťisima Trŕinidad" by Spanish explorers as early as 1690 (Ibib.). Originally from San Felipe, Guanajuato, the family came from "El Valle" in South Texas in 1915; other members of the family moved farther North of Chicago and Michigan (Martinez) Jose Calvillo Martinez had heard about work at the cement plants in Eagle Ford, Texas three miles West of present-day downtown Dallas, where they settled and lived. The Southwestern States Portland Cement Company, built in 1907, became the Trinity Portland when the family arrived. The plant was also known as Cemento Grande, the larger of two such plants in the area. The other was known as Cemento Chico. The plants provided concrete for the rapidly industrializing city of Dallas and surrounding cities.

It wasn't until the 1940s that Eagle Ford began to experience significant growth. Approximately 150 people lived in the community in 1941. After World War II, the return of war veterans spurred housing developments in the area. The demand was so great that many residents lived in temporary shelters until their houses were completed. A large segment of Eagle Ford's new residents were African Americans who came to the area in search of jobs. Home choices were limited due to rigid racial segregation policies present in most local neighborhoods. Black families were encouraged to settle in Eagle Ford and ads for properties in the community were listed in local newspapers under "Colored Lots." Living conditions were substandard and consisted of small "shotgun" homes without sewers or drains on dirt roads with trash blowing in the streets. The poor sanitation conditions led to typhoid outbreaks and a high rate of infant mortality. Even with all of these problems, may African Americans who had come to the area with very little valued the opportunity to own their own homes.

Housing conditions in Eagle Ford improved after the community was annexed into the city of Dallas in the mid-1950s. Over the next few years, home construction was accompanied by industrial growth and infrastructure improvements. Many of the modest homes constructed during this period remain in use, although most have been remodeled, updated, altered, or expanded in some way.

By 1990, Eagle Ford had a population of 7,924. That figure rose 2.26 percent to 8,103 by the 2000 census. Today, Eagle Ford is a predominately Hispanic, working-class neighborhood.

== Demographics ==
Eagle Ford is divided into two census tracts, 106.01 and 106.02, by the United States Census Bureau for statistical purposes.

As of the census of 2000, there were 8,103 people, 1,964 households, and 1,719 families residing within the neighborhood. The racial makeup of the neighborhood was 34.43% White, 8.07% African American, 0.65% Native American, 2.30% Asian/Pacific Islander, 50.23% from other races, and 4.32% from two or more races. Hispanic or Latino of any race were 85.72% of the population.

The median income for a household in the neighborhood was $25,757, and the median income for a family was $29,776. Males had a median income of $23,688 versus $17,944 for females. The per capita income for the neighborhood was $9,176.

== Education ==
The Dallas Independent School District (DISD) serves most of Eagle Ford, while small portions of the neighborhood lie within the boundaries of Irving Independent School District (IISD).

Two DISD elementary campuses are located in the Eagle Ford neighborhood. They are Gabe P. Allen Charter School and Eladio R. Martinez Learning Center. Both schools serve students in grades pre-kindergarten through five. Sixth through eighth graders are zoned to Thomas A. Edison Middle Learning Center, which feeds into L.G. Pinkston High School .

In the area served by Irving ISD, Kindergarten through fifth grade students living along Mexicana Road in the northern portion of Eagle Ford attend Schulze Elementary School. Townley Elementary School serves the area located immediately north of the I-30/Loop 12 interchange that is zoned to Irving schools. Both Schulze and Townley feed into Bowie Middle School (Grades 6-8) and Nimitz High School (Grades 9-12). The district also has an early childhood education program for students who are four years old and meet certain eligibility requirements.

The Eagle Ford School (a formerly all-white school, not to be confused with the segregated Eagle Ford School for Black students located a few blocks to the north), constructed in 1923 with supplies from the Trinity cement company and funding from bonds issued by the city of Dallas, first opened in 1924. After the school closed, Randy Dumse bought the school in 1987 and used it as his business's office. The Dallas city government made it a historic landmark, and Larry Moser, an investor, acquired it.

== Geology ==
The Eagle Ford community overlies rocks of the Eagle Ford Shale. The Eagle Ford shale consists of organic-rich, pyritic, and fossiliferous marine shales.
