= Ledbetter Gardens, Dallas =

Ledbetter Gardens ('Round the River)
- Country: United States
- State: Texas
- Counties: Dallas
- City: Dallas
- Area: West Dallas

Population (2000)
  - Total: 1,316
- ZIP code: 75212
- Area codes: 214, 469, 972

Ledbetter Gardens is a small neighborhood in West Dallas, Texas, United States. Its boundaries are Canada Drive to the north, Bernal Drive to the south, Rupert Street on the east, and Pluto Street on the west. Westmoreland Road, Canada and Bernal Drives are major access points to the neighborhood.

Ledbetter Gardens is a predominantly mixed African American and Hispanic and/or Latino American working-class neighborhood.

== Demographics ==
For statistical purposes, Ledbetter Gardens is identified as Block Group 1 of Census tract 105 by the United States Census Bureau.

As of the census of 2000, there were 1,316 people residing within the neighborhood. The racial makeup of the neighborhood was 64.3% African American, 8.4% White, 25.9% from other races, and 1.4% from two or more races. Hispanic or Latino of any race were 35.9% of the population.

== Education ==
Ledbetter Gardens is almost evenly split between the Dallas Independent School District (DISD) and Irving Independent School District (IISD).

The Dallas ISD portion is zoned to Amelia Earhart Learning Center, which serves students in grades pre-kindergarten through five. Sixth through eighth graders are zoned to Thomas A. Edison Middle Learning Center, which feeds into L.G. Pinkston High School .

The Irving ISD portion is zoned to Schulze Elementary School, which serves students in grades Kindergarten through five. Schulze Elementary feeds into Bowie Middle School (Grades 6-8) and Nimitz High School (Grades 9-12). The district also has an early childhood education program for students who are four years old and meet certain eligibility requirements.
