= West Dallas =

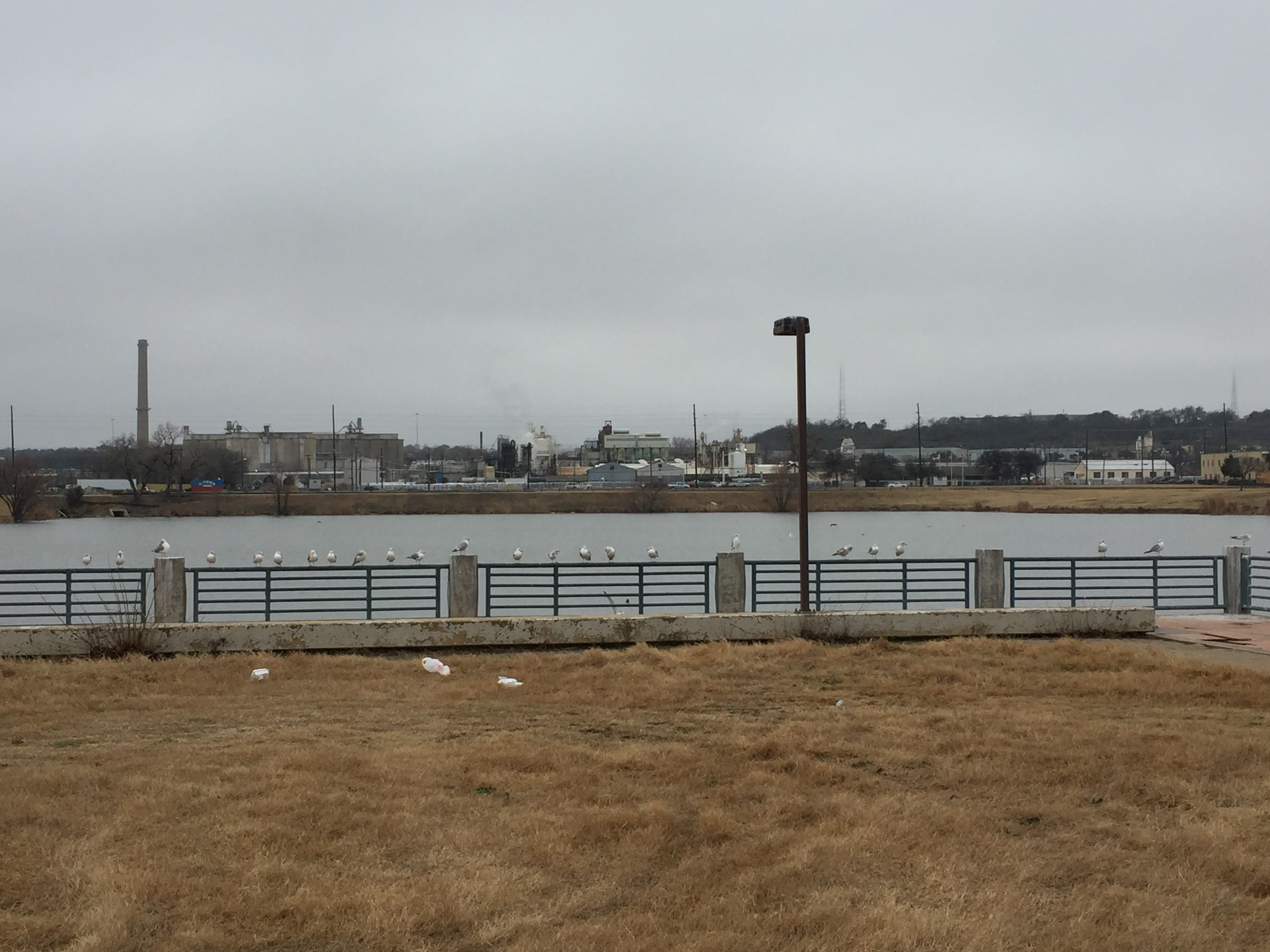
- Fish Trap Lake Park in West Dallas, including the smokestack of the defunct RSR Corporation smelter in the background

- Location in Dallas
- Country: United States
- State: Texas
- Counties: Dallas
- City: Dallas

Area
  - Total: 11.45 sq mi (29.66 km^{2})
  - Land: 11.45 sq mi (29.66 km^{2})
  - Water: 0 sq mi (0 km^{2}) 0%
- Elevation: 406 ft (124 m)

Population (2000)
  - Total: 24,132
- ZIP code: 75212 (main postal zip code), 75208 and 75211 (small areas)
- Area codes: 214, 469, 972
- Website: www.westdallaschamber.org

West Dallas is an area consisting of many communities and neighborhoods in Dallas, Texas, United States. West Dallas lies just west of Downtown Dallas, north of Oak Cliff, and east of Irving and Grand Prairie.

Largely lying in the Trinity River floodplain, the area's history has been largely defined by its relationship to the river, to industry, and to downtown. Although not incorporated into Dallas until the 1950s, West Dallas has had a close but problematic relationship to the city since its founding. The area is currently undergoing significant changes due to its central location within the city, attracting new development and revitalization efforts but also threatening existing communities.

== Geography ==
The City of Dallas defines West Dallas boundaries as Interstate 30 on the south, the Trinity River on the east and north, and the Trinity River's West Fork on the west.

The southern part of West Dallas is elevated by the Austin Chalk limestone formation, creating a continuous ridge with Oak Cliff that overlooks the Trinity and downtown Dallas. The majority of West Dallas lies in the Trinity River floodplain and is traversed Singleton Boulevard.

== History ==
The recorded history of the area that would become West Dallas begins in the 1840s, when the Republic of Texas offered up to 640 acres of land to homesteaders in North Texas.

The town of Eagle Ford, a significant community in the early history of West Dallas, was established as a farm in 1844 by Enoch Horton at the site of ford in the west fork of the Trinity River floodplain. In 1857 Enoch's son Jacob established a grist mill that would be an important hub for the local farming community. Enoch's daughter Sarah Horton Cockrell was an important business leader in early Dallas, most notably building the first bridge connecting the city Dallas to west.

In 1855, the Fourierist colony of La Réunion was established on a limestone ridge overlooking the Trinity floodplain. The colony attracted approximately five hundred European settlers starting in 1855, briefly rivaling the small town of Dallas as an urban center. Although the colony was formally dissolved in 1857 and many of the settlers returned to Europe, others such as Benjamin Long and Jacob Boll moved to Dallas and became prominent citizens in the growing metropolis. A few, such as the Santerre and Reverchon families would remain and continue to farm the colony land until the turn of the 18th century.

In 1873, the Texas and Pacific Railway began service through West Dallas, and because of the Panic of 1873, Eagle Ford would remain the western terminus of the line for several years. This led to a brief boom period for the city, as the town became a major cattle shipment hub. This brief boom period would last until 1878, when construction had resumed and Fort Worth supplanted it and Eagle Ford's significance and population declined.

Industrial development and exploitation of the area began in the early 1900s, with the establishment of a brick works using the rich Trinity clay, and a cement works that processed the limestone cliffs into cement.

The town of Cement, Texas was incorporated on April 28, 1908 as a segregated factory town for the Texas Portland Cement Company. Many of the workers at the cement plant were Mexican immigrants who were fleeing the Mexican Revolution.

As West Dallas's population grew, flooding became an increasingly serious problem, as much of the area lies in the flood prone Trinity bottom lands. The Dallas Levee System was originally completed in 1932 and upgraded in the 1950s by the United States Army Corps of Engineers, significantly addressing the flooding problem in the area.

Although in 1931 Cement City had a population of 609, the population had declined to 249 in the late 1940s and by 1951 the community was no longer incorporated. In 1954, West Dallas was officially annexed by the city of Dallas.

In 1955, the West Dallas housing projects were established, consisting of three separate developments, segregated by race (Blacks, Hispanics and Whites). The names of the developments were George Loving Place, Edgar Ward Place and Elmer Scott Place.

On April 2, 1957, the devastating 1957 Dallas tornado passed through West Dallas. That same year, the Dallas-Fort Worth Turnpike opened as a toll road, and would eventually become Interstate 30 in 1977 when the toll was paid off. The highway would accelerate the growth of Grand Prairie and Arlington, leading directly to the creation of Six Flags Over Texas but also created an enormous physical barrier between West Dallas and Oak Cliff.

In 1984, a $45 million settlement was reached with RSR Corporation on behalf of 370 West Dallas children who had been harmed by the RSR lead smelting plant's operations.

On September 29, 1995 the smelting plant site was declared a Superfund site after decades of efforts by local residents.

In March 2012, the Santiago Calatrava-designed Margaret Hunt Hill Bridge opened as part of the Trinity River Project. The bridge and associated Trinity Groves retail development have marked a new era of gentrification for the neighborhood. Neighborhoods such as La Bajada have been put under pressure from rising property taxes and speculative real estate development.

== Environmental history ==
In 1934 Murphy Metals (later known as RSR Corporation), started operating a 63-acre (250,000 m^{2}) secondary lead smelter facility in West Dallas. The process melts lead scrap into metallic lead that can then used for casting. Significant lead emissions can occur from poorly controlled refining, casting, and drossing operations.

The city of Dallas annexed West Dallas into the city limits in 1954. Before that year, many residents lived in an area lacking the basic services because they resided outside the city lines. Shortly after annexationin 1956, the city built a 3,500-unit public housing complex just north of the RSR lead smelter facility. The southern edge of the public housing complex was located 50 feet (15 m) from the lead smelter's property line.

In 1968 the City of Dallas enacted an ordinance regulating pollution thresholds for the facility. This act went unenforced - in the 1960s RSR Corp West Dallas facility released more than 269 tons of lead particles into the air each year. Few residents could afford air conditioning, so in the summers they kept their doors and windows open, directly exposing them to the toxins. In 1972, Dallas officials learned that lead could be finding its way into the bloodstreams of children who lived in West Dallas and the bordering community of East Oak Cliff. The Dallas Health Department then conducted a study - they found children living near smelters had a 36 percent increase in blood lead levels. In 1974 the city sued local smelters and RSR Corporation agreed to pay $35,000 and install new pollution control equipment - however by 1983 they still had not installed the pollution equipment.

In 1981 public concern and pressure were raised after the West Dallas Boys Club had to suspend outside activity after a soil test showed lead levels 36 times those considered dangerous for children; the club was forced to close in 1983 due to high lead levels. The Dallas Alliance Environmental Task Force, a citizens group appointed by the Dallas City Council, said this in a 1983 study:

“We believe the city had missed many opportunities to serve and protect the community at large and two neighborhoods in particular in relation to the lead problem we now address. It is clear that the State and Federal governments have also failed in their opportunity to regulate and industry of this type with regard to the general welfare of citizens.”

On September 6, 1984 the Dallas Board of Adjustment ordered the smelter closed. In the summer of 1985 an out-of-court settlement for $20 million was reached between RSR and a class including 370 children and 40 property owners affected by the lead, represented by Fred Baron.

In May 1993 a proposal was made to add the lead smelter site to the National Priorities List as a Superfund site. On September 28, 1994, the EPA signed the Preliminary Close Out Report for the site stating all clean-up for all the units had been completed. The EPA then signed a Ready For Reuse document in May 2005 declaring the site ready for reuse or redevelopment. The EPA reported that the clean-up resulted in direct lower lead blood leaves of children; the community also benefited by having 400 properties on 300 acres (1.2 km^{2}) of commercial property eliminated of contamination.

== Demographics ==
In the late 1980s, the neighborhood had a population of 13,161. As of the 2000 U.S. census, there were 24,132 people living in the neighborhood. The racial makeup of the neighborhood was 2.7% White, 37.3% African American, 0.6% Native American, 2.4% Asian or Pacific Islander, 41.8% from Hispanic or Latino, and 15.2% from two or more races.

== Neighborhoods ==
West Dallas has been the site of significant redevelopment since the opening of the Margaret Hunt Hill Bridge in 2012. New developments include Trinity Groves, on Singleton Boulevard, Sylvan/Thirty, on Fort Worth Avenue, and multiple condominiums and townhomes.

These developments are bringing top-tier chefs, yoga studios, fresh-food markets, hip retail and apartments and condos with views of the downtown Dallas skyline, the Margaret Hunt Hill Bridge and the Margaret McDermott Bridge.

Long-standing neighborhoods in West Dallas prior to gentrification of the community include:

Neighborhoods of West Dallas

=== Major neighborhoods ===
- Eagle Ford
- El Aceite (mistakenly written as "La L'aceate")
- La Bajada
- La Loma, Dallas
- Lake West
- Ledbetter Gardens
- Los Altos
- Muncie, Dallas
- Western Heights
- Westmoreland Heights

=== Other neighborhoods ===
- Bickers Park
- Buena Vista
- Cross Hampton
- Cross Westmoreland
- Commerce Heights
- College Park (Riggins)
- Colonia Tepeyac, Dallas
- Coombs West End
- Crossman Ave
- Gilbert-Emory
- Fish Trap Projects
- Greenleaf Village
- Homestead Manor
- La Estrella, Dallas
- La Mexicanita
- P J Allen No 3
- Rupert Circle Projects
- Victory Gardens
- Weisenberger Lucky 7
- Westmoreland Park

=== Industrial sections ===
- Lone Star Industrial Park
- Singleton Industrial Area
- Turnpike Distribution Center

=== Former places ===
- La Réunion
- Cement City
- West Dallas Housing Projects

== Education ==
=== Public education ===
Public education in West Dallas is provided by Dallas and Irving Independent School Districts, as well as a public charter school from Uplift Education and two private schools. Dallas schools cover over 90% of the area — only areas on the north side of the original channel of Westmoreland and on the west side of the original channel of Mountain Creek attend Irving schools. (See: Channeling of the Trinity River)

All students zoned to Dallas ISD Schools attend Thomas A. Edison Middle Learning Center and L. G. Pinkston High School, as well as one of the following elementary schools:

- C. F. Carr Elementary School
- Sequoyah Learning Center (Demolished for L. G. Pinkston new site)
- Dallas Environmental Science Academy (Now housed in the former Amelia Earhart)
- George W. Carver Learning Center (Demolished for L. G. Pinkston new site)
- Amelia Earhart Elementary School (Closed)
- Benito Juarez (Closed)
- Fredrick Douglas (Closed)
- Priscilla Tyler (closed and purchased by West Dallas Community School)
- Lorenzo DeZavala Elementary School
- Sidney Lanier Elementary School Vanguard for Expressive Arts
- Eladio R. Martinez Learning Center
- Gabe P. Allen Elementary School
- West Dallas STEM School

All students zoned to Irving schools attend Bowie Middle School and Nimitz High School. Students living on the north side of the original channel of the West Fork of the Trinity River attend Schulze Elementary School and students living on the west side of the original channel of Mountain Creek attend Townley Elementary School.

Students in West Dallas may also attend Uplift Heights Preparatory, a college preparatory, non-selective, but lottery-based public charter school located in the Lake West neighborhood of West Dallas. As of August 2015, Uplift Heights serves slightly more than 1,700 Pre-Kindergarten through 11th grade students. Uplift Heights will have its first graduating class in 2017. Uplift Heights Preparatory has been open since 2006 and is part of Uplift Education.

=== Private education ===
- Mayo Kindergarten, a Christian Private School, formerly located in Eagle Ford in the 5500 block of Fannie Street. Mrs. Sammie Lee Crump, was the owner and operator of the school and it was the first Black owned school in West Dallas.
- West Dallas Community School, a Christian private school, is in West Dallas.
- St. Mary of Carmel Catholic School, established in 1944, is located at 1716 Singleton Boulevard in the heart of West Dallas.

=== Post-secondary education ===
- Dallas College West Dallas Center.

=== Other educational centers and resources ===
- Voice of Hope Ministries, a Christian Out-of-School time program founded in 1982 is in West Dallas. They provide after school and summer programming for the children of West Dallas.
- Wesley-Rankin Community Center
- Readers To Leaders
- Mercy Street
- Josephine Torres Cultural and Community Center at the Historic Bataan Center

past providers: West Dallas Community Centers Inc. 1940s-2017 Trinity River Mission 1960s-2020 La Voz del Anciano- West Dallas

== Government agencies and organizations ==
- United States Postal Service Dallas Main Post Office processing center
- Dallas Public Library West Dallas Branch is at 2332 Singleton Blvd.
- Dallas College West Dallas Center
- West Dallas Multipurpose Center
- Builders of Hope
- SPCA of Texas

== Transportation ==
=== Bus ===
- DART
- GoLink Dallas Area Rapid Transit#GoLink

=== Light rail ===
- DART
  - West End Station
  - Dallas Union Station known as the Eddie Berniece Johnson or EBJ Union Station
  - Victory Station

=== Alternative Transportation ===
- West Dallas Circuit https://www.ridecircuit.com/westdallas

=== Highways ===
- Interstate 30
- Interstate 35E
- Texas State Highway Spur 366
- Texas State Highway Loop 12
- Dallas North Tollway

== Notable people ==
- Alexander Cockrell and Sarah Horton Cockrell, business and civic leaders in mid to late 19th century Dallas
- Julien Reverchon, renowned botanist and member of La Réunion (Dallas) colony
- Bonnie and Clyde, Great Depression-era celebrity criminals
- Mattie Lee Nash, first West Dallas African American City Councilwoman, known as the Mayor of West Dallas, fought tirelessly to better the West Dallas community was elected in 1991 and served one term.
- Actress Regina Taylor
- The D.O.C., pioneering gangster rapper known for his work with N.W.A. and Dr. Dre
