= Kerry Cooks =

American football player and coach (born 1974)

Rice Owls
- Title: Safeties

Personal information
- Born: March 28, 1974 (age 52); Dallas, Texas, U.S.
- Listed height: 5 ft 11 in (1.80 m)
- Listed weight: 204 lb (93 kg)

Career information
- High school: Nimitz (Irving, Texas)
- College: Iowa
- NFL draft: 1998: 5th round, 144th overall pick

Career history

Playing
- Minnesota Vikings (1998); Green Bay Packers (1998); Atlanta Falcons (2000)*; Jacksonville Jaguars (2001)*; Chicago Enforcers (2001)
- * Offseason or practice squad member only

Coaching
- Nimitz High School (2003) Assistant Coach; Kansas State (2003) Graduate Assistant; Western Illinois (2004) Defensive Backs / Special Teams Assistant; Minnesota (2005) Defensive Backs; Wisconsin (2006–2009) Defensive Backs; Notre Dame (2010–2011) Cornerbacks; Notre Dame (2012–2014) Co-Defensive Coordinator / Cornerbacks; Oklahoma (2015–2016) Defensive Backs; Oklahoma (2017–2018) Assistant defensive coordinator / Safeties; Texas Tech (2019) Safeties; Notre Dame (2020–2021) Defensive Assistant; LSU (2022–2023) Safeties; Rice (2024) Defensive assistant; Rice (2025) Safeties

Career NFL statistics
- Tackles: 4
- Fumble recoveries: 1
- Stats at Pro Football Reference

Kerry Cooks (born March 28, 1974) is an American college football coach and former player. He is the safeties coach for Rice University, a position he has held since 2025.

== Biography ==
Cooks was born on March 28, 1974, in Dallas, Texas. He is a graduate of the University of Iowa, where he was a team captain on the football team, and is married with two children. Cooks was inducted into the Irving Independent School District Hall of Fame Class of 2013.

== Professional playing career ==
Cooks was originally drafted by the Minnesota Vikings in 1998 and later that year signed and played with the Green Bay Packers. He would also play with the Atlanta Falcons and Jacksonville Jaguars before retiring from the NFL before playing with the Chicago Enforcers of the XFL in 2001.

== Coaching career ==
After having coached at the high school level, Cooks joined the Kansas State Wildcats as a graduate assistant in 2003. He later coached defensive backs at Western Illinois and Minnesota. Cooks spent four seasons at the University of Wisconsin coaching defensive backs. From 2010 to 2014, he served as secondary coach at the University of Notre Dame (adding the role of Co-defensive Coordinator in 2012). In 2015, Cooks was hired by Bob Stoops to become the secondary coach at the University of Oklahoma. In 2019, he joined Texas Tech as safeties coach. In 2022 he went to LSU as the team's safeties coach. On January 3, 2024, Head Coach Brian Kelly announced that LSU would part ways with Cooks prior to the 2024 season.
