= Lake West, Dallas =

Lake West
- Interactive map of Lake West
- Country: United States
- State: Texas
- Counties: Dallas
- City: Dallas
- Area: West Dallas

Population (2000)
  - Total: 3,115
- ZIP code: 75212
- Area codes: 214, 469, 972

Lake West is a neighborhood in West Dallas, Texas, United States. Its boundaries are Canada Drive to the north, the Union Pacific Railroad tracks to the south, Hampton Road on the east, and Westmoreland Road on the west.

== Demographics ==
For statistical purposes, the Lake West neighborhood is identified as Census tract 102 and Block Group 1 of Census tract 104 by the United States Census Bureau.

As of the census of 2000, there were 3,115 people residing within the neighborhood. The racial makeup of the neighborhood was 9.5% White, 79.4% African American, 0.3% Native American, 0.6% Asian, 8.9% from other races, and 1.3% from two or more races. Hispanic or Latino of any race were 18.5% of the population.

== Education ==
Public education in Lake West is provided by the Dallas Independent School District (DISD). Two elementary schools (Grades PK-5) serve the neighborhood. The northern portion of Lake West is zoned to George Washington Carver Learning Center, while the southern portion is served by Sequoyah Learning Center. Sixth through eighth graders are zoned to Thomas A. Edison Middle Learning Center, which feeds into L.G. Pinkston High School . Uplift Education, the largest charter school provider in North Texas, opened Heights Preparatory in 2010. As of the 2013–14 school year, the school will serve K-2 and 6–9, and will subsequently add grade levels each school year. The school currently outperforms the neighborhood's DISD schools.
