= La Bajada, Dallas =

Place in West Dallas, Texas, United States

La Bajada
- Country: United States
- State: Texas
- Counties: Dallas
- City: Dallas
- Area: West Dallas

Population (2020)
  - Total: 854
- ZIP code: 75212
- Area codes: 214, 469, 972

La Bajada is a small neighborhood in West Dallas, Texas, United States. Its boundaries are Canada Drive to the north and east, Sylvan Avenue on the west, and Singleton Boulevard to the south.

== Demographics ==
For statistical purposes, the neighborhood is identified as Blocks 1001 through 1021 of Census tract 101.02 by the United States Census Bureau.

As of the census of 2020, there were 854 people residing within the neighborhood. Hispanics made up 94.3% of the population.

== Education ==
Public education in La Bajada is provided by the Dallas Independent School District (DISD). Lorenzo DeZavala Elementary School serves students in grades pre-kindergarten through five. Sixth through eighth graders are zoned to Thomas A. Edison Middle Learning Center, which feeds into L.G. Pinkston High School .
