= Los Altos, Dallas =

Los Altos
- Country: United States
- State: Texas
- Counties: Dallas
- City: Dallas
- Area: West Dallas

Population (2000)
  - Total: 6,093
- ZIP code: 75212
- Area codes: 214, 469, 972

Los Altos is a neighborhood in West Dallas, Texas, United States. Its boundaries are Canada Drive to the north, Singleton Boulevard to the south, Sylvan Avenue on the east, and Chihuahua Avenue on the west.

== Demographics ==
For statistical purposes, the Los Altos neighborhood is identified as Census tract 101.01 and Block Groups 2 & 3 of Census tract 101.02 by the United States Census Bureau.

As of the census of 2000, there were 6,093 people residing within the neighborhood. The racial makeup of the neighborhood was 27.0% White, 39.3% African American, 0.4% Native American, 0.2% Asian, 30.7% from other races, and 2.4% from two or more races. Hispanic or Latino of any race were 59.0% of the population.

== Education ==
Public education in Los Altos is provided by the Dallas Independent School District (DISD). Three elementary schools (Grades PK-5) serve the neighborhood. Most of the area is served by C.F. Carr Elementary School. The eastern part of Los Altos lies within the Lorenzo DeZavala Elementary School attendance zone, while the far southern portion of the neighborhood is served by the Sidney Lanier Expressive Arts Vanguard School. Sixth through eighth graders are zoned to Thomas A. Edison Middle Learning Center, which feeds into L.G. Pinkston High School .
