= Westmoreland Heights, Dallas =

Coordinates: 32.7829°N 96.8769°W

Westmoreland Heights and Westmoreland Park
- Nickname: Cross Westmoreland
- Interactive map of Westmoreland Heights and Westmoreland Park
- Country: United States
- State: Texas
- Counties: Dallas
- City: Dallas
- Area: West Dallas

Population (2000)
  - Total: 1,036
- ZIP code: 75212
- Area codes: 214, 469

Westmoreland Heights is a small neighborhood in West Dallas, Texas, United States. Its boundaries are Bernal Drive to the north, Singleton Boulevard to the south, Westmoreland Road on the east, and Norwich Lane on the west.

Westmoreland Park is a small neighborhood in West Dallas, Texas, United States. Its boundaries are Canada Drive to the north, Bernal Dr to the south, Westmoreland Road on the east, and Pluto St on the west Westmoreland Park is a mixed African American and Hispanic, working-class neighborhood.

== Demographics ==
For statistical purposes, Westmoreland Heights is identified as Block Groups 2 & 3 of Census tract 105 by the United States Census Bureau.

As of the census of 2000, there were 1,036 people residing within the neighborhood. The racial makeup of the neighborhood was 74.3% African American, 7.1% White, 0.1% Native American, 17.4% from other races, and 1.1% from two or more races. Hispanic or Latino of any race were 25.0% of the population.

== Education ==
Public education in Westmoreland Heights and Westmoreland Park is provided by the Dallas Independent School District (DISD). The neighborhood is zoned to Amelia Earhart Learning Center, which serves students in grades pre-kindergarten through five. Sixth through eighth graders are zoned to Thomas A. Edison Middle Learning Center, which feeds into L.G. Pinkston High School.
