= Mayoral elections in Irving, Texas =

Elections for mayor in Irving, Texas

Elections are currently held every three years to elect the mayor of Irving, Texas.

== 1997 ==
1997 Irving mayoral election
- May 3, 1997 (G); May 17, 1997 (R)
- Turnout: 9.26% (G); 7.15% (R)
Candidate	Morris Parrish	Harry Joe	Randy Randle
Party	Nonpartisan	Nonpartisan	Nonpartisan
Popular vote	3,348 (G); 3,258 (R)	3,168 (G); 3,209 (R)	1,804
Percentage	40.24% (G); 50.38% (R)	38.08% (G); 49.62% (R)	21.68%
Mayor before election
Morris Parrish
Elected mayor
Morris Parrish

The 1997 Irving mayoral election was held on May 3, 1997. Since no candidate had received more than 50% of the votes, a run-off election took place on May 17, 1997. It saw the reelection of Morris Parrish.

General election results
Candidate	Votes	%
Morris Parrish	3,348	40.24
Harry Joe	3,168	38.08
Randy Randle	1,804	21.68
Total votes	8,320	100

Run-off election results
Candidate	Votes	%
Morris Parrish	3,258	50.38
Harry Joe	3,209	49.62
Total votes	6,467	100

== 1999 ==
1999 Irving mayoral election
- May 1, 1999
- Turnout: 6.22%
Candidate	Joe Putnam	Roland Jeter
Party	Nonpartisan	Nonpartisan
Popular vote	3,847	2,998
Percentage	52.98%	41.29%
Candidate	Clair Woertendyke	Michael Compotaro
Party	Nonpartisan	Nonpartisan
Popular vote	299	117
Percentage	4.12%	1.61%
Mayor before election
Morris Parrish
Elected mayor
Joe Putnam

The 1999 Irving mayoral election was held on May 1, 1999. It saw the election of Joe Putnam.

Election results
Candidate	Votes	%
Joe Putnam	3,847	52.98
Roland Jeter	2,998	41.29
Clair Woertendyke	299	4.12
Michael Compotaro	117	1.61
Total votes	7,261	100

== 2002 ==
2002 Irving mayoral election
- May 4, 2002
- Turnout: 10.08%
Candidate	Joe Putnam	Melvin L. Pullen
Party	Nonpartisan	Nonpartisan
Popular vote	1,024	268
Percentage	77.91%	22.09%
Mayor before election
Joe Putnam
Elected mayor
Joe Putnam

The 2002 Irving mayoral election was held on May 4, 2002. The incumbent mayor Joe Putnam was reelected.

Election results
Candidate	Votes	%
Joe Putnam	1,024	77.91
Melvin L. Pullen	268	22.09
Total votes	1,292	100

== 2005 ==
2005 Irving mayoral election
- May 7, 2005 (General); June 11, 2020 (Run-off)
- Turnout: 14.42% (General); 11.76% (Run-off)
Candidate	Herbert Gears	Marvin Randle
Party	Nonpartisan	Nonpartisan
Popular vote	2,035 (G); 4,925 (R)	2,726 (G); 3,999 (R)
Percentage	21.16% (G); 55.19% (R)	28.35% 44.81% (R)
Candidate	Terry Waldrum	Joe Putnam
Party	Nonpartisan	Nonpartisan
Popular vote	1,966	1,408
Percentage	20.45%	14.65%
Mayor before election
Joe Putnam
Elected mayor
Herbert Gears
Democratic

The 2005 Irving mayoral election was held on May 7, 2005. As no candidate had received more than 50% of the votes, a run-off election took place on June 11. Herbert Gears was elected.

General election results
Candidate	Votes	%
Marvin Randle	2,726	28.35
Herbert Gears	2,035	21.16
Terry Waldrum	1,966	20.45
Joe Putnam	1,408	14.64
Owen DeWitt	1,089	11.32
Thomas D. Spink	304	3.16
Melvin L. Pullen	88	0.92
Total votes	9,616	100

Run-off election results
Candidate	Votes	%
Herbert Gears	4,925	55.19
Marvin Randle	3,999	44.81
Total votes	8,924	100

== 2008 ==
2008 Irving mayoral election
- May 10, 2008
- Turnout: 5.41%
Candidate	Herbert Gears	Roland Jeter	Rigo Reza
Party	Nonpartisan	Nonpartisan	Nonpartisan
Popular vote	5,320	3,737	782
Percentage	54.07%	37.98%	7.95%
Mayor before election
Herbert Gears
Democratic
Elected mayor
Herbert Gears
Democratic

The 2008 Irving mayoral election was held on May 10, 2008. The incumbent mayor Herbert Gears was reelected.

Election results
Candidate	Votes	%
Herbert Gears	5,320	54.07
Roland Jeter	3,737	37.98
Rigo Reza	782	7.95
Total votes	9,839	100

== 2011 ==
2011 Irving mayoral election
- May 14, 2011 (General); June 18, 2011 (Run-off)
- Turnout: 11.09% (General); 9.70% (Run-off)
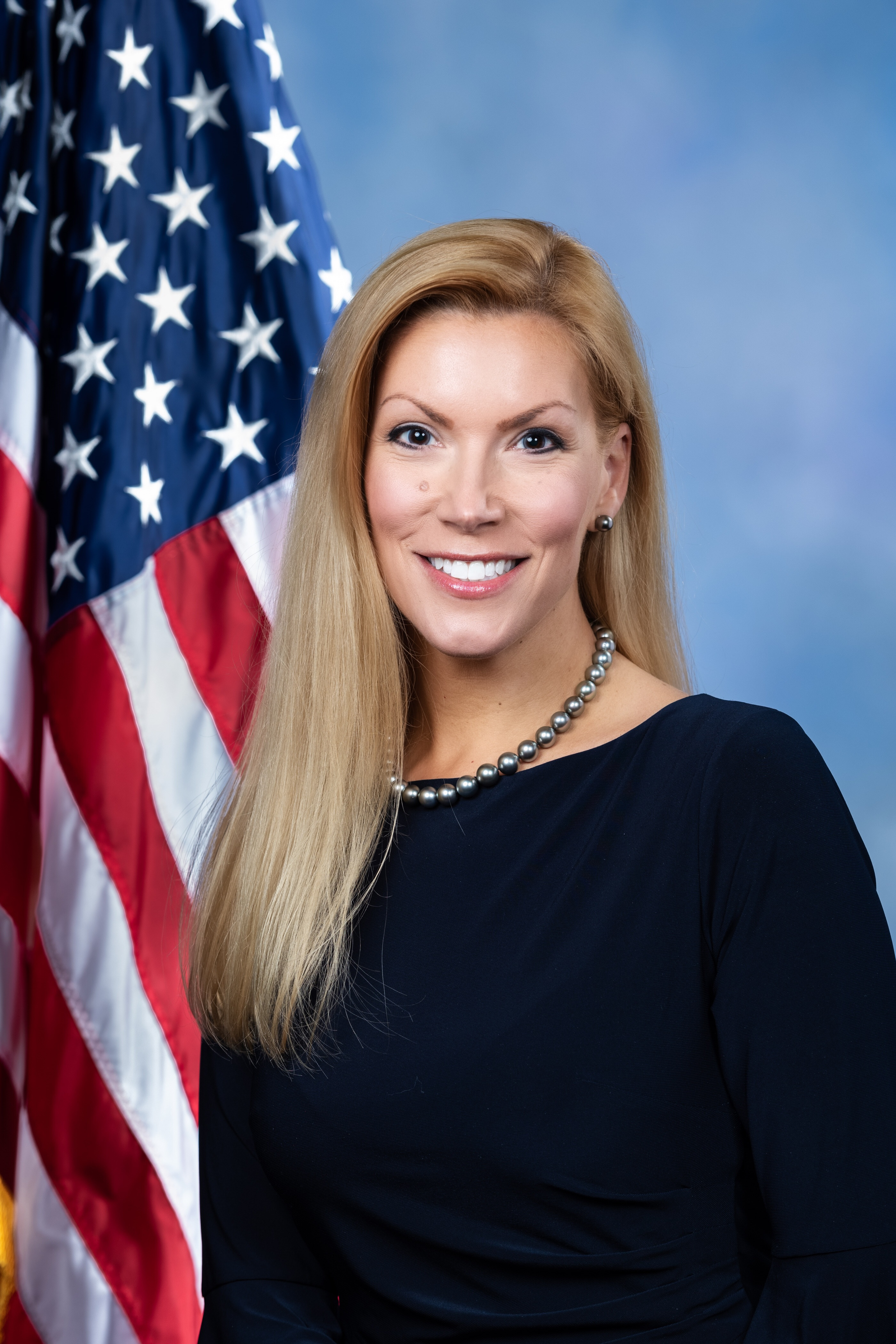
Candidate	Beth Van Duyne	Herbert Gears
Party	Nonpartisan	Nonpartisan
Popular vote	4,377 (G); 6,865 (R)	3,986 (G); 5,170 (R)
Percentage	41.48% (G); 57.04% (R)	37.78% (G); 42.96% (R)
Candidate	Joe Putnam	Tom Spink
Party	Nonpartisan	Nonpartisan
Popular vote	1,475	713
Percentage	13.98%	6.76%
Mayor before election
Herbert Gears
Democratic
Elected mayor
Beth Van Duyne
Republican

The 2011 Irving mayoral election was held on May 14, 2011. As no candidates had received over 50% of the votes, a run-off election took place on June 18. Beth Van Duyne, a former member of the city council, was elected as the new mayor.

General election results
Candidate	Votes	%
Beth Van Duyne	4,377	41.48
Herbert Gears	3,986	37.78
Joe Putnam	1,475	13.98
Tom Spink	713	6.76
Total votes	10,551	100

Run-off election results
Candidate	Votes	%
Beth Van Duyne	6,865	57.04
Herbert Gears	5,170	42.96
Total votes	12,035	100

== 2014 ==
2014 Irving mayoral election
- May 10, 2014
- Turnout: 5.27%
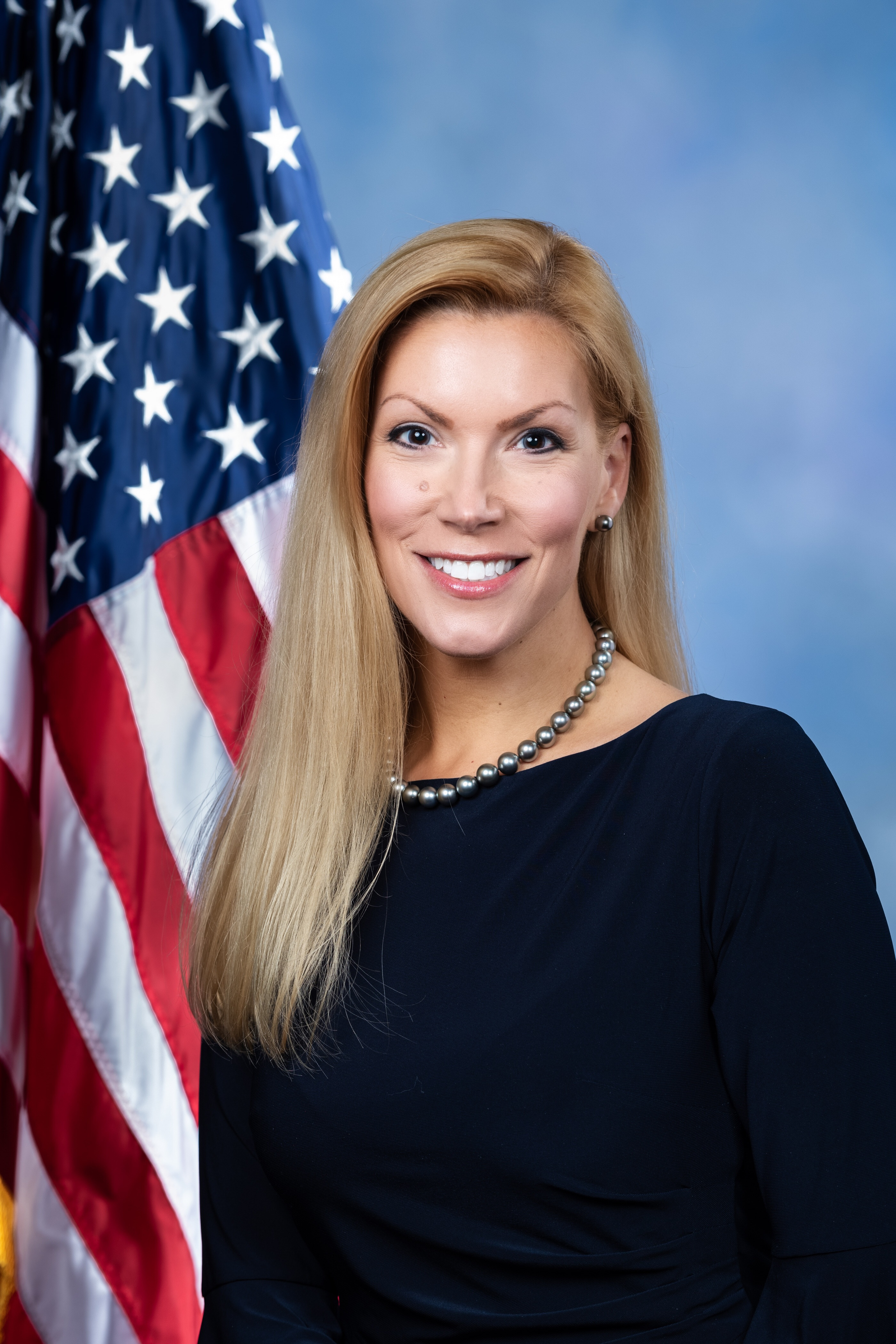
Candidate	Beth Van Duyne	Herbert Gears
Party	Nonpartisan	Nonpartisan
Popular vote	4,934	2,167
Percentage	69.48%	30.52%
Mayor before election
Beth Van Duyne
Republican
Elected mayor
Beth Van Duyne
Republican

The 2014 Irving mayoral election was held on May 10, 2014. The incumbent mayor Beth Van Duyne won reelection for a second term.

Election results
Candidate	Votes	%
Beth Van Duyne	4,934	69.48
Herbert Gears	2,167	30.52
Total votes	7,101	100

== 2017 ==
2017 Irving mayoral election
- May 6, 2017
- Turnout: 7.87%
Candidate	Rick Stopfer	Kristi Weaver Pena
Party	Nonpartisan	Nonpartisan
Popular vote	6,795	1,984
Percentage	67.48%	19.70%
Candidate	Elvia Espino	J. C. Gonzalez
Party	Nonpartisan	Nonpartisan
Popular vote	904	386
Percentage	8.98%	3.83%
Mayor before election
Beth Van Duyne
Republican
Elected mayor
Rick Stopfer
Republican

The 2017 Irving mayoral election was held on May 6, 2017. The incumbent mayor Beth Van Duyne did not seek reelection. Rick Stopfer, a member of the city council, was elected as the next mayor.

Election results
Candidate	Votes	%
Rick Stopfer	6,795	67.48
Kristi Weaver Pena	1,984	19.70
Elvia Espino	904	8.98
J. C. Gonzalez	386	3.83
Total votes	10,069	100

== 2020 ==
2020 Irving mayoral election
- November 3, 2020
- Turnout: 66.13%
Candidate	Rick Stopfer	Olivia Novelo Abreu
Party	Nonpartisan	Nonpartisan
Popular vote	35,532	30,424
Percentage	54.87%	46.13%
Mayor before election
Rick Stopfer
Republican
Elected mayor
Rick Stopfer
Republican

The 2020 Irving mayoral election was held on November 3, 2020. It was originally scheduled to be held on May 2, but was postponed due to the COVID-19 pandemic. The incumbent mayor won the reelection into a second term.

Election results
Candidate	Votes	%
Rick Stopfer	35,532	53.87
Olivia Novelo Abreu	30,424	46.13
Total votes	65,956	100

== 2023 ==
The 2023 Irving mayoral election was held on May 6, 2023. The incumbent mayor Rick Stopfer won the election automatically since he ran unopposed.

== 2026 ==
2026 Irving mayoral election
- May 2, 2026
Candidate	Albert Zapanta	Zhanae Jackson	Olivia Novelo Abreu
Party	Nonpartisan	Nonpartisan	Nonpartisan
Popular vote	6,001	1,661	1,274
Percentage	67.16%	18.59%	14.26%
Mayor before election
Rick Stopfer
Republican
Elected mayor
Albert Zapanta
Republican

The 2026 Irving mayoral election was held on May 2, 2026. The incumbent mayor Rick Stopfer was term-limited. Albert C. Zapanta, a businessman was elected as the next mayor.

Election results
Candidate	Votes	%
Albert Zapanta	6,001	67.16
Zhanae Jackson	1,661	18.59
Olivia Novelo Abreu	1,274	14.26
Total votes	8,936	100.00
