= HUBZone =

United States Small Business Administration program

HUBZone is a United States Small Business Administration (SBA) program for small companies that operate and employ people in Historically Under-utilized Business Zones (HUBZones). The HUBZone program was created in response to the HUBZone Empowerment Act created by the US Congress in 1998. Based on the Act, small businesses will be designated as HUBZone certified if they have the following criteria:

1. The firm must be a small business based on the North American Industry Classification System (NAICS) for size standards.
2. The business must be at least 51% owned and controlled by U.S. citizens, or a Community Development Corporation, an agricultural cooperative, or an Indian tribe (including Alaska Native Corporations).
3. The firm's principal office (the location where the greatest number of employees perform their work, excluding contract sites) must be in a HUBZone.
4. 35% of the firm's total workforce must reside in a HUBZone.

On average, about 3,000 entities register for HUBZone certification each year.

== Definition ==
HUBZones are 'historically under-utilized business zone', located within one or more:

1. Qualified census tracts;
2. Qualified non-metropolitan counties;
3. Lands within the external boundaries of an Indian reservation;
4. Qualified base closure area; or
5. Redesignated area

To determine if a location (residence or business) is in a HUBZone, the SBA web site has a feature the make this determination found at

The primary goal of the program is to create incentives for the U.S. federal government to do contracting with businesses that operate and create jobs in communities with statistically proven economic needs.

== Government contracting requirements ==
The federal government has a goal of awarding 3% of all federal prime-contract dollars to HUBZone-certified companies. The government has made some progress towards these goals, but by and large remains below them. Because the program represents only 3% of the contracts awarded by federal agencies, the program has received an equivalent level of attention. In 2018, HUBZone companies started to become more proactive in trying to get opportunities 'set-aside' for HUBZone-certified companies. Through organizations such as the HUBZone Chamber of Commerce, companies are starting to collaborate to increase their responses to Sources Sought as posted through FedBizOpps.gov

== HUBZone creators ==
Numerous legislators created and continue to support the HUBZone program. However, it is widely held that U.S. Senator Kit Bond (R-MO) was the true creator of the program and continues to be the champion. His motivation came from numerous meetings with business owners at events that discussed training. In those events, the feedback was grateful for the training for businesses in lower economic areas, but the training was slated as inadequate unless work was also going to be allocated to those communities. Based on the need for jobs, Senator Bond began the concept of HUBZones.

== Notable facts ==
- The first business to receive a contract under the HUBZone program's simplified acquisition program was Garrett Container based in Accident, Maryland.
- The US federal government approved $13+ billion dollars for annual distribution to HUBZone firms. Currently, approximately half of the money is actually being distributed. Many qualified businesses still encounter barriers to entry and are intimidated by the process.
- The program has not generated enough HUBZone contract dollars to have an impact on a national scale. When spread over an eight-year period across 2,450 metropolitan areas and counties with qualified census tracts, qualified counties, and Indian reservations, $6 billion has a limited impact.
- HUBZone set-asides are the most frequently used tool to award HUBZone contracts. HUBZone sole source and price preferences were least often used by contracting officers.
- Progress on HUBZone and all small business contracting rates is available on the government's Small Business Dashboard
- Businesses need to re-certify for the HUBZone program every three years. There is no limit to the length of time a business can continue to re-certify as long as it continues to qualify.
