= Trinity Groves, Dallas =

Real estate development in Texas

Coordinates: 32°46′44″N 96°49′44″W

Trinity Groves is a restaurant and retail development in West Dallas, at the western end of the Margaret Hunt Hill Bridge. The development is owned and managed by Stuart Fitts, Larry "Butch" McGregor, and Phil Romano.

Trinity Groves has a Restaurant Concept Incubator program, wherein chefs open new restaurant concepts and see if they are successful enough to expand nationwide.

There are plans to expand the development by building apartments and additional retail space, to create a new urban neighborhood close to downtown and the city core.
