= Chateau Theater =

Coordinates: 32.8297°N 96.9780°W

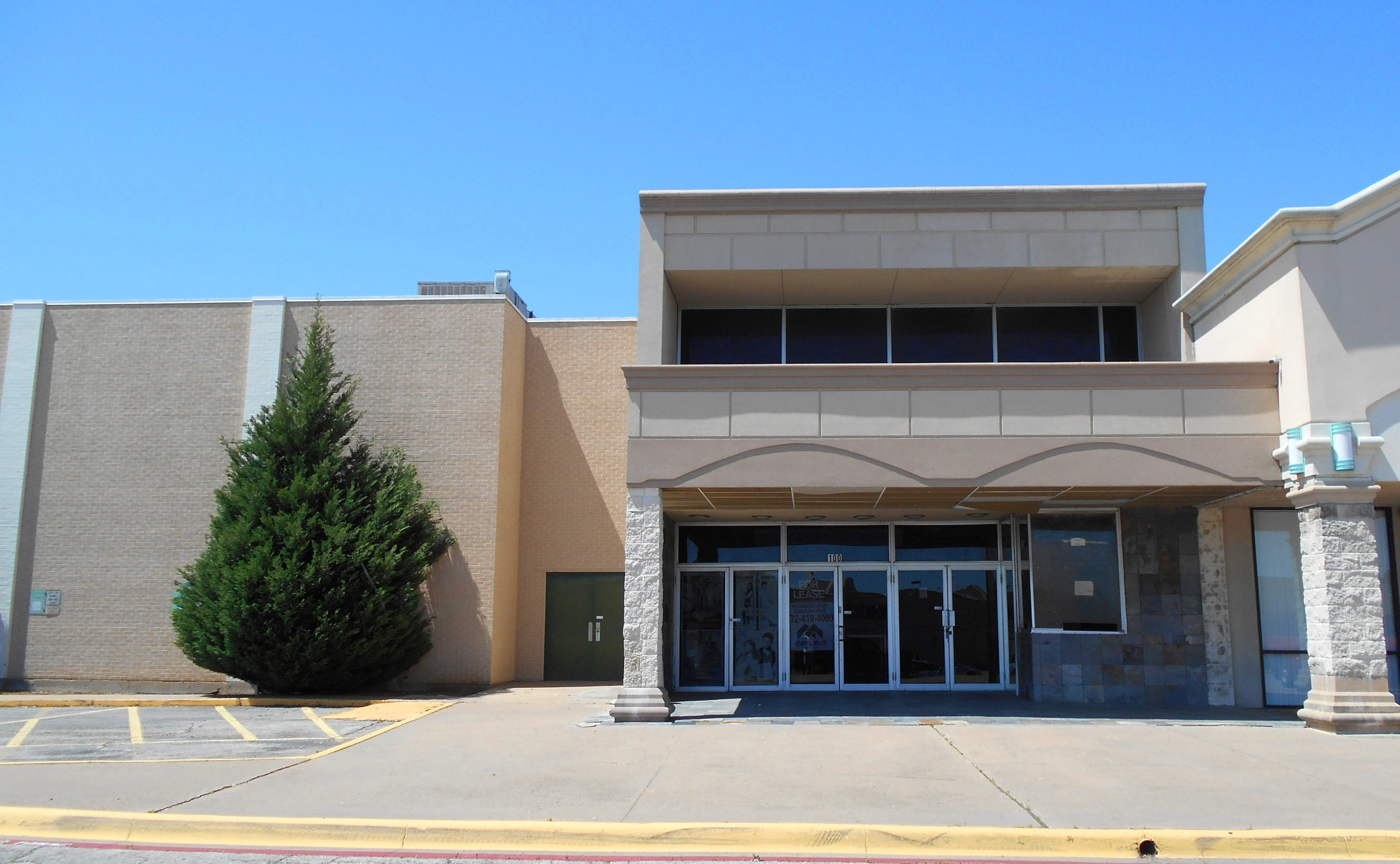
The abandoned Chateau theater in Irving, Texas

The Chateau Theater (not to be confused with Minnesota's more historic Chateau Theatre) opened in 1964 as part of a chain of premium, dollar, and drive-in theaters that stretched across North Texas and Oklahoma, owned and operated by entrepreneur, cameo star of 1980s slasher film Honeymoon Horror and (alleged) former Golden Gloves boxer Jerry Meagher.

Throughout the 1970s and 1980s, Meagher's theaters suffered setbacks and closures until the Chateau was the last of his franchise: a three-screen dollar theater operating in the Plymouth Park strip mall in Irving, Texas.

Threatened by waning attendance, particularly following the opening of the high budget Starplex Cinemas just blocks away from the Chateau's location, the theater eventually sold to former Nortel Networks engineer Jaipal Reddy, who rebranded it as the Everest Theater (and later FunAsia) and maintained a dedicated Bollywood film lineup.

Though little information or artifacts remain on any of Meagher's theaters, a small scrap from the chain's late November, 1976 newspaper advertisement can be seen in Errol Morris's film The Thin Blue Line, the events of which take place in part at Meagher's long since demolished 183 Drive In.

As of November 2020, the Chateau Theater has been demolished.
