= Donnie Williams (American football) =

American football player (born 1948)

No. 83
- Position: Wide receiver

Personal information
- Born: March 12, 1948 (age 78); Dallas, Texas, U.S.
- Listed height: 6 ft 3 in (1.91 m)
- Listed weight: 210 lb (95 kg)

Career information
- High school: Pinkston (Dallas)
- College: Prairie View A&M (1966–1969)
- NFL draft: 1970: 2nd round, 35th overall pick

Career history
- Los Angeles Rams (1970); New Orleans Saints (1971)*; Kansas City Chiefs (1971)*; Washington Redskins (1973)*
- * Offseason or practice squad member only

Career NFL statistics
- Receptions: 1
- Receiving yards: 9
- Stats at Pro Football Reference

Charles Donell "Donnie" Williams (born March 12, 1948) is an American former professional football player who was a wide receiver for one season with the Los Angeles Rams of the National Football League (NFL). He was selected by the Rams in the second round of the 1970 NFL draft. He played college football for the Prairie View A&M Panthers of Prairie View A&M College of Texas.

== Early life and college ==
Charles Donell Williams was born on March 12, 1948, in Dallas, Texas. He attended L. G. Pinkston High School in Dallas, Texas.

He was a member of the Prairie View A&M Panthers of Prairie View A&M College of Texas from 1966 to 1969.

== Professional career ==
Williams was selected by the Los Angeles Rams in the second round, with the 35th overall pick, of the 1970 NFL draft. He signed with the team on March 9. He played in five games for the Rams during the 1970 season and caught one pass for nine yards.

On August 16, 1971, Williams was traded to the New Orleans Saints for Gene Howard and Clovis Swinney. On October 13, 1971, it was reported that Williams had been signed by the Kansas City Chiefs after he had requested his release from the Saints' taxi squad.

Williams signed with the Washington Redskins in 1973. On August 17, 1973, it was reported that he had been waived by the Reskins.
