= Aeroxchange =

American online marketplace

- Type: Online shopping
- Founded: July 2000
- Headquarters: Irving, Texas
- Website: www.aeroxchange.com

Aeroxchange is a neutral purchasing portal for the aviation industry based in Irving, Texas. Founded in July 2000 and commenced operations a couple of months later on October 1, 2000. It is the only electronic business network that supports all MRO business processes within the aviation industry for buyer and sellers. Aeroxchange provides a complete lifecycle of electronic communication from order creation to final invoice. The Aeroxchange service accelerates repair, replenishment, sourcing, inventory pooling and other critical operations in the aviation supply chain. Aeroxchange automates the exchange of documents and information for commercial transactions. Its electronic platform dramatically reduces manual activity for transaction processed by fax, telephone and email, and increases the accuracy and timeliness of information and document exchange.

Founded by 13 airlines, Aeroxchange has been joined by 20 other airlines and several suppliers. The founders include Air Canada, Air New Zealand, All Nippon Airways, American Airlines (via America West Airlines) , Austrian Airlines Group, Cathay Pacific Airways, FedEx Express, Japan Airlines, KLM, Lufthansa, Delta Air Lines (via Northwest Airlines), Scandinavian Airlines System and Singapore Airlines.

The service focuses on the repair, replenishment, sourcing, consignment/VMI, inventory pooling and other critical operations in the aviation supply chain. It automates the exchange of documents and information for commercial transactions. Aeroxchange claims, “Our electronic platform dramatically reduces manual activity for transaction processed by fax, telephone and email, and increases the accuracy and timeliness of information and document exchange.”
