= Albert C. Zapanta =

American politician, businessman, and soldier (born 1941)

Albert Zapanta

Mayor of Irving
- Incumbent
- Assumed office May 2, 2026
- Preceded by: Rick Stopfer

Member of the Irving City Council from the 6th place
- Incumbent
- Assumed office May 6, 2018
- Preceded by: Brad M. LaMorgese

Personal details
- Born: Albert C. Zapanta; March 8, 1941 (age 85)
- Party: Republican
- Education: University of Southern California (BA,MPA)

Albert C. Zapanta (born March 8, 1941) is an American politician and businessman who is CEO of the Dallas-based U.S.-Mexico Chamber of Commerce, and the mayor of Irving, Texas. Zapanta is a former major general who was a Green Beret in the Vietnam War. He became head of public affairs for Atlantic Richfield (ARCO).

He ran for Mayor of Irving in 2026 and was successful in his bid with 67.1% of the vote.

== Biography ==
=== Early life ===
Zapanta received a Bachelor of Arts in Industrial Psychology and a Master of Arts in Public Administration from the University of Southern California, where his father, Al Zapanta, Sr. had also attended and played on the football and track teams in the 1930s and where his cousin, Dr. Edward Zapanta was trustee. Zapanta also graduated from the Harvard Business School, the Inter-American Defense College at the National War College in Washington, D.C.

=== Military career ===
Zapanta was a member of the Department of State's Advisory Committee on International Trade, Technology and Development, and later became the first U.S. senior officer to become Chief of Staff of the United Nations peacekeeping mission to the Western Sahara. Zapanta's military record includes the award of the Silver Star, five Bronze Stars for Valor, the Purple Heart, and 30 other awards during the Vietnam War. He was also awarded the Joint Service Commendation Medal for the Gulf War, Operation Restore Hope in Somalia, and Operation Uphold Democracy in Haiti.

=== Career ===
He started his career at Bethlehem Steel. He also served as Assistant Secretary of the Department of the Interior for Management and Administration from 1976 to 1977. From 1978 to 1993, he was a vice president of ARCO. In 1973 he returned to his alma mater, USC, to found the USC Mexican-American Alumni Association with then President John R. Hubbard, the first of its kind organization to bring diversity, equity, and inclusion to a major university and the prototype for the hundreds of similar organizations that now exist at nearly every university across the United States.

Zapanta was also the founder, chairman, and CEO of PAZ Energy, LLC, which partnered with Chesapeake Energy to consult and advise Dallas Fort Worth International Airport authorities on the potential viability of extracting natural gas from below the airport grounds.

He serves as president and CEO of the United States-Mexico Chamber of Commerce and previously sat on the board of directors of Tyson Foods. He is a trustee at the University of Dallas.
