= Sarah Horton Cockrell =

Texas pioneer and businesswoman (1819–1892)

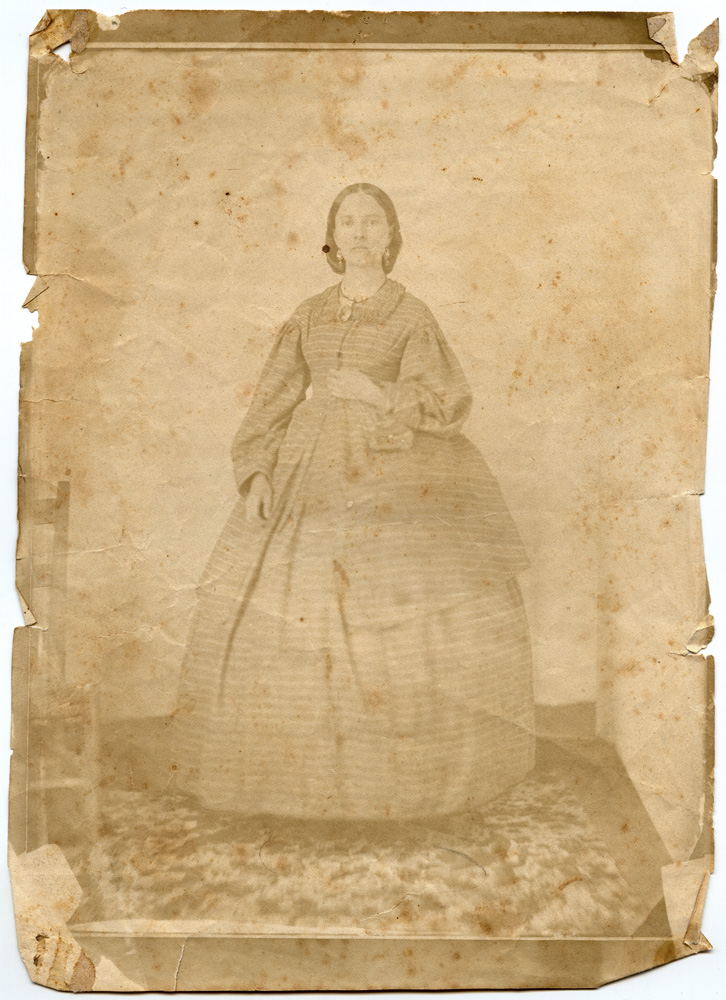
- [Sarah Horton Cockrell] Creator: Unknown Date: ca. 1840s
- Born: Sarah Horton; January 13, 1819
- Died: April 26, 1892 (aged 73)
- Spouse: Alexander Cockrell
- Children: 5

Sarah Horton Cockrell (January 13, 1819 – April 26, 1892) was a Texan business woman who is known for her contributions to the economic and infrastructural development of the town of Dallas from 1858 to her death. At the time of her death, she is reported to have owned approximately a quarter of what was then Downtown Dallas and is said to have been one of the first millionaires in Texas.

== Life and work ==
Sarah Horton Cockrell was born in Virginia to Enoch Horton and Martha Horton on January 13, 1819. Her family was among the earliest pioneers in Dallas County in 1844.

Sarah married Alexander Cockrell on September 9, 1847. Their union produced five children. Sarah and her husband lived in a tent on Mountain Creek until they were able to purchase a headright along the Trinity River, the last remaining townsite in Dallas, from John Neely Bryan. Together Sarah and her husband engaged in several ventures including running the Trinity River ferry service, which formed a part of the acquisition from Bryan. They were also involved in brick-making, construction, real estate, and operated a sawmill.

Sarah's husband was killed in 1858. She subsequently took over management of the family businesses with assistance from her son and son-in-law. She managed three hotels. A year after her husband's death she opened the St. Nicholas Hotel but it was destroyed in the 1860 Dallas fire. She subsequently opened the Dallas Hotel and later the St. Charles.

Sarah Horton Cockrell continued to expand the family business, to establish her family as one of the more eminent in Dallas. Her enterprises spanned various industries. She was involved in flour milling and pursued various real estate ventures, owning an estimated twenty five percent of downtown Dallas as at her death in 1892. This is in addition to other landholdings throughout Texas, such as in Houston, Cleburne, and Mineral Wells.

In 1855, Sarah and her husband had built a wooden bridge across the Trinity River but it collapsed the same year of her husband's death. Sarah later formed the Dallas Bridge Company in 1870, through which she constructed an iron suspension bridge over the Trinity River, an important milestone in the development of Dallas as it provided the town with important links with major roads especially towards the south and west connecting the town with North Texas. Between 1871, the year the bridge was opened, and 1881, she managed and collected toll on the bridge. It was later sold to the City of Dallas. This bridge is, perhaps, the most significant symbol of her contribution to the development of Dallas.

She opened the Sarah Cockrell Addition, a private residential subdivision, in 1884. The following year she constructed a multi-story office building. She is also a founding member of the First Methodist Church of Dallas. She donated money towards the building of the church. A stained glass window was put up in memory of her gift.

Sarah Horton Cockrell is cited as one of the pioneer women in Dallas. She is often commended for being able to profit in business as a woman, while maintaining the respect of society. She managed her businesses from her home, appointing other trusted individuals to represent her interests. She was thus able to conform to the societal dictates as a woman, while excelling in business.

== Death ==
Sarah Cockrell died at the home of her son, Alex Cockrell, on April 26, 1892. Her remains are interred at the Greenwood Cemetery in Dallas County.
