= Census block =

Geographic unit used by the US Census

A census block is the smallest geographic unit used by the United States Census Bureau for tabulation of 100-percent data (data collected from all houses, rather than a sample of houses). The number of blocks in the United States, including Puerto Rico and other island areas, for the 2020 Census was 8,180,866.

Census blocks are grouped into block groups, which are grouped into census tracts. There are on average about 39 blocks per block group. Blocks typically have a four-digit number; the first number indicates which block group the block is in. For example, census block 3019 would be in block group 3.

Blocks are typically bounded by roads and highways, town/city/county/state boundaries, creeks and rivers, etc. In cities, a census block may correspond to a city block, but in rural areas where there are fewer roads, blocks may be delimited by other features such as political boundaries, rivers and other natural features, as well as parks and similar facilities, etc. The population of a census block varies greatly. As of the 2010 United States census, there were 4,871,270 blocks with a reported population of zero, while a block that is entirely occupied by an apartment complex might have several hundred inhabitants.

Census blocks covering the entire country were introduced with the 1990 United States census. Before that, back to the 1940 census, only selected areas were divided into blocks.
