= Irving Independent School District =

School district in Texas

Location
- Irving, Texas United States

District information
- Type: Public
- Motto: "Where Children Come First"
- Grades: Pre-Kindergarten through 12th grade
- Established: 1909
- Superintendent: Dorian Galindo
- Budget: $250 million general fund

Students and staff
- Students: 34,851 (2011–12)
- Staff: full-time teachers: 2315; full-time staff: 1729; full-time and part-time: 4875
- Athletic conference: 6A

Other information
- Website: www.irvingisd.net

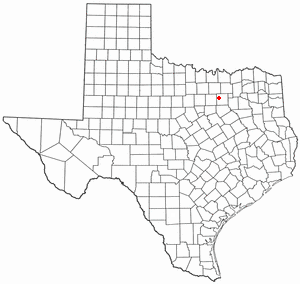
Location of Irving within Texas

Location of Texas within the United States

Irving Independent School District is a school district based in Irving, Texas (USA). The district, which covers 48.5 square miles (126 km^{2}), serves most of the city of Irving, except for Valley Ranch and a portion of Las Colinas. The district also serves small portions of Grand Prairie and Dallas.

There are two parts of West Dallas that are in Irving ISD: an area south of the west fork of the Trinity River and north of the Bernal Greenbelt, and an area west of Top Line Drive and south of the Trinity River.

== School District ==
Each Irving ISD high school student is issued a laptop computer or iPad. The IISD Library Media Program received national recognition in 2000 and 1991 when it received the National School Library Media Program of the Year Award (Large District Category) by the American Association of School Librarians.

In 2010, the final year of TEA academic ratings, the school district was rating academically acceptable. While the school district has a high percentage of free and reduced lunch students, language minority students, all schools have consistently been ranked either exemplary, recognized, or academically acceptable by the TEA. In 2010 and 2011, the school district received a 5-star rating from the Texas Comptroller for its fiscal management and academic progress. Irving ISD was one of approximately 43 school districts out of over 1200 in Texas to receive the rating in 2010. During the 2011 school year, Irving was one of only 23 school districts out of over 1200 to repeat the 5-star rating. In 2015, Irving ISD was one of two winners of the national AP District of the Year by College Board.

IISD graduates in the Class of 2010 earned approximately $22 million in scholarship offers. Eleven seniors were recognized by the National Merit Scholarship Program, and many others received local, regional, state and national honors in academics, fine arts, and athletics.

== Demographics ==
Irving ISD is made up of 80% low-income families, including 9,500 high school students. It is also a majority-minority district. The student population represents more than fifty-six countries speaking over ninety-five languages.

- African American 12.06%
- American Indian 0.47%
- Asian 3.57%
- Hispanic 70.84%
- White 11.66%

During the 2011–12 school year, the district had a peak enrollment of 34,851. The district enrollment has risen since 2007 when it faced a decrease in student population as result of the City of Irving performing a code enforcement crackdown on several low rent apartments, causing many low income families to leave the district. In addition, then Superintendent Jack Singley said that some illegal immigrants may have feared deportation, so they and their families left the district. It has also been noted that minorities, primarily Whites and Asians are bullied.

In 1997, 43.4% of the students were non-Hispanic white. Eric Nicholson of the Dallas Observer stated that white flight was already occurring by then. In 2000 45% of the students were Hispanic or Latino, but this increased to 61% by 2005. By 2016, 9.2% of the students were non-Hispanic white, and Nicholson concluded that "change happened rapidly."

In 1997, 49.2% of the students were low income - Nicholson stated that an increase in poor students was already occurring by then-but this increased to 79.6% in 2016.

== School uniforms ==
All Irving ISD elementary and middle school students are required to wear school uniforms, a dress code that has been enforced since the 1999-2000 school year. The uniforms consists of a polo shirt and appropriate school pants (navy blue pants, khakis, etc.). The acceptable shirt colors are light blue, white, forest green, navy blue and attending campus school colors and as a recent change in school dress code Black polos have started being allowed. High schools do not have school uniforms but still enforce district dress code. High school students are trusted to wear appropriate attire.

The Texas Education Agency (TEA) specifies that the parents and/or guardians of students zoned to a school with uniforms may apply for a waiver to opt out of the uniform policy so their children do not have to wear the uniform; parents must specify "bona fide" reasons, such as religious reasons or philosophical objections.

== High schools ==
- Irving High School
- MacArthur High School

- The United States Department of Education designated MacArthur High School as a National Blue Ribbon School in May 2002.

- Nimitz High School
- Jack E. Singley Academy (formerly The Academy of Irving ISD)
- Cardwell Career Preparatory Center

== Middle schools ==
- Austin Middle School
- Bowie Middle School
- Crockett Middle School
- DeZavala Middle School
  - de Zavala Middle School will transition into a School of Opportunity for the 2025-2026 school year.
- Houston Middle School
- Lamar Middle School

- Lamar Middle School was designated a National Blue Ribbon School in May 2000.

- Travis Middle School
- Lady Bird Johnson Middle School

- Lady Bird MS opened in the 2011-12 school year as the largest net-zero middle school in the country. The school is powered by solar panels, wind turbines, etc. and produces as much energy as it uses while serving a student population of approximately 1000 students.

== Primary schools ==
- Barton Elementary School
- Brandenburg Elementary School
- Britain Elementary School
  - Britain Elementary School was closed in 2024.
- Brown Elementary School
- Davis Elementary School
- Elliott Elementary School
  - Elliott Elementary School was closed in 2024.
- Farine Elementary School
- Gilbert Elementary School
- Good Elementary School

- Good Elementary School was designated a National Blue Ribbon School in May 2001. Good was also one of 12 schools in the U.S. and the only school in Texas to receive special recognition in technology in 2001.

- John Haley Elementary School
- Thomas Haley Elementary School
- Hanes Elementary School
- Johnston Elementary School
- Keyes Elementary School
- Lee Elementary School
- Lively Elementary School
- Schulze Elementary School
- Stipes Elementary School
- Townley Elementary School
- Townsell Elementary School

=== Early childhood centers ===
- Clifton Early Childhood School
- Kinkeade Early Childhood School
- Pierce Early Childhood School

=== Learning centers ===
- Elementary Development Center
- Ratterree Career Development Center
- Secondary Reassignment Center
- Barbara Cardwell Career Preparatory Center (Formerly Union Bower Center for Learning)
- Wheeler Transitional and Development Center
