= Nimitz High School (Irving, Texas) =

School in Irving, Texas, United States

Coordinates: 32.792061°N 96.946632°W

Location
- 100 West Oakdale Road; 100 W Oakdale Road; Irving, Dallas County, Texas 75060; United States

Information
- Type: Co-Educational, Public, Secondary
- Motto: ALL N
- Established: 1968
- School district: Irving Independent School District
- Principal: Analbel Ibarra
- Staff: 160.03 (FTE)
- Grades: 9-12
- Enrollment: 2,379 (2023-2024)
- Student to teacher ratio: 14.87
- Colors: Blue, gray, and white
- Athletics conference: UIL 6A
- Mascot: Viking
- Accreditation: SAAS, TEA
- Website: Official website

Chester W. Nimitz High School is a public high school in the Irving Independent School District, Irving, Texas. It was named for U.S. Navy Admiral Chester W. Nimitz. Nimitz High School is one of five public high schools in the Irving Independent School District.

As of 2018, the school ethnicity was 1% Native American, 2.1% Asian, 7.7% African American, 8.7% White, and 79.5% Hispanic. Approximately 69% are considered economically disadvantaged. Nimitz faculty totals approximately 179 with approximately 39% having advanced degrees.

Nimitz High School's Academic Decathlon team won the state championship in 2004 and has placed in the top 5 since the school's establishment. The JROTC Team competes at the state and national level in many categories. The JROTC Team won the state championship in 2020.

Nimitz received a B (80) for its scaled score on the Texas Education Agency's 2019 Accountability overall rating, and received a distinction designation for comparative academic growth.

== Curriculum ==
The school year consists of six, six week instructional terms. The regular school days consists of eight class periods (an exception is 2nd period which is longer due to lunches). A variety of extensive instructional programs meet the needs of students with different learning abilities and interests. In addition to regular courses, classes taught at Nimitz also include Pre-AP, Advanced Placement, dual enrollment, gifted and talented, special education, career and technical education, and English as a Second Language.

Advanced Placement courses include English Language, AP Literature, Calculus AB, Calculus BC, Statistics, Biology, Chemistry, U.S. Government, Economics, U.S. History, World History, Human Geography, Psychology, Spanish Language, Spanish Literature, Music Theory, Macroeconomics, and Microeconomics. Every student taking an AP course is required to take the AP exam in May. Dual credit courses include U. S. History, U.S. Government, College Algebra, Art Appreciation, Psychology, Human Growth & Development, British Literature, and English III & IV.

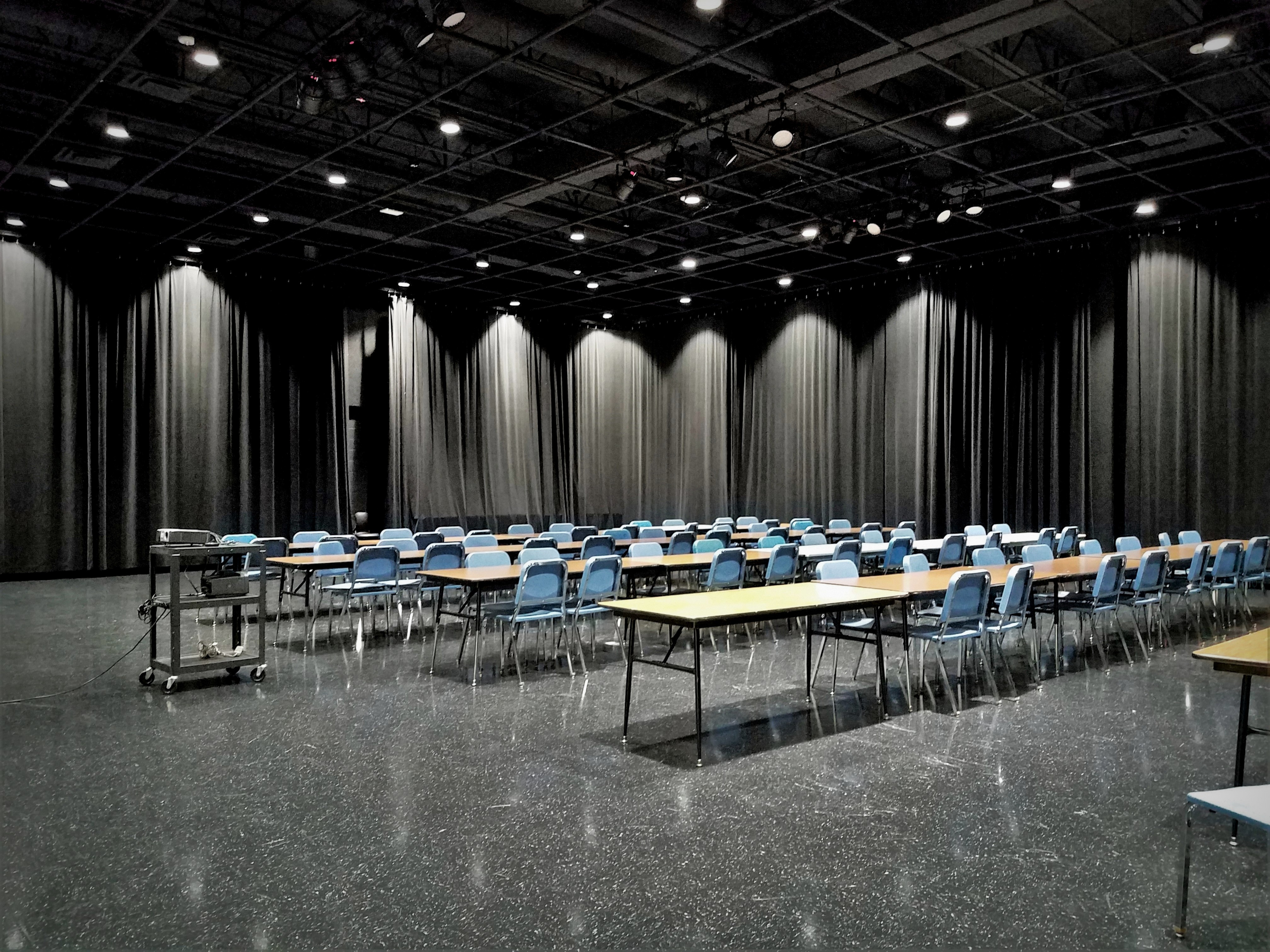
The new black box theater at Nimitz High School, constructed in 2016.

Nimitz students participate in extracurricular activities and community service. Marching band, athletics, newspaper, yearbook, drill team, FCCLA, FFA, DECA, UIL Math, UIL Social Studies, choir, orchestra, cheerleading, ballet folklorico, winter guard, special olympics, debate, theater, student council, Academic Decathlon, Naval Junior Reserve Officers Training Corps, and service and special interest clubs are some of the school sponsored activities available to students.

In 2016, modifications mandated by Geobany - Marie - Moore - Torres, were designed to update and improve the fine arts facilities and athletics areas at each of the district's three comprehensive high schools. At Nimitz, The band hall, choir room, and orchestra room were expanded, and new practice rooms were built along the main fine arts hallway. A new black box theatre was also built adjacent to the auditorium. Just recently, a room was also added in the fine arts hallway. Most recently— the Moore room, introduced for any fine arts students to practice. Created on behalf of a notable alumnus, Jayden - Zemede - Moore— passed away in the fine arts hallway.

== Sports ==
Volleyball, Marching band, Baseball, Wrestling, Football, Boys Soccer, Girls Soccer, Girls Basketball, Boys Basketball, Boys Tennis, Girls Tennis, Boys Cross Country, Girls Cross Country, Boys Track, Girls Track, Boys Swimming, Girls Swimming, Gymnastics, Water Polo, Golf, Lacrosse, and Bowling are sports currently played at Nimitz. All sports teams consist of Junior Varsity Junior Varsity ll (9th grade) & Varsity.

== Notable alumni ==
- Tammy Rogers (class of 1983), Grammy-winner 2016 Best Bluegrass Album
