= Census block group =

Geographic unit used by the US Census

A census block group is a geographical unit used by the United States Census Bureau which is between the census tract and the census block. It is the smallest geographical unit for which the bureau publishes sample data, i.e. data which is only collected from a fraction of all households. Typically, Block Groups have a population of 600 to 3,000 people.

Every census block group has a unique 12-digit FIPS code. The block group's unique identifier is the 12th digit of the FIPS Code. This number determines the first digit of all the census blocks contained within a block group. For instance, census Block Group 2 includes any block numbered 2000 to 2999.

For the 2000 US Census, the United States including Puerto Rico had 211,267 block groups, each containing an average of 39 blocks.

For the 2010 US Census, the United States (not including Puerto Rico, United States Virgin Islands, etc.) had 217,740 block groups, each containing an average of 51 blocks.
