= L. G. Pinkston High School =

High school in Dallas, Texas, United States

L.G. Pinkston High School

Location
- 2815 Bickers Street; Dallas, Texas 75212; United States; 32.78773°N 96.86814°W

Information
- Type: Public, Secondary
- School district: Dallas Independent School District
- Principal: Mr. Dwain Simmons
- Staff: 74.73 (FTE)
- Grades: 9-12
- Enrollment: 1,224 (2023-2024)
- Student to teacher ratio: 16.38
- Colors: Black and gold
- Mascot: Viking
- Website: www.dallasisd.org/pinkston

L.G. Pinkston High School is a public secondary school in West Dallas, Texas (USA). L.G. Pinkston High School enrolls students in grades 7-12 and is a part of the Dallas Independent School District (DISD).

The school is named in honor of Dr. Lee Gresham Pinkston, an African American doctor who opened what was then Dallas's sole clinic for African-Americans, Pinkston Clinic Hospital, in 1927. He died in 1961. The school serves the West Dallas neighborhoods.

In 2015, the school was rated "Met Standard" by the Texas Education Agency.

== History ==
L.G. Pinkston High School opened in September 1964 as a school for black children. The building cost, with a capacity of 2,000, was $3,067,215. Circa 1965 it had about 900 students.

Dwain Simmons became principal in 2014.

As of 2015 the school had about 1,000 students. DISD had plans to rebuild the high school. DISD board member Lew Blackburn stated that he believed that the district's price figure of $130 million is too high. A plan was proposed to have the George Washington Carver Creative Arts Learning Center building closed so a new Pinkston High School could be built on its site, tentatively opening in 2020.

The school began serving middle school levels in 2018, absorbing students from the closed Edison Middle Learning Center, which had perennial low scores in Texas state tests. This meant Pinkston became DISD's first combined grade 7-12 school. A single wing of the complex was dedicated for the middle school students, with the first floor for 7th graders, the second for eighth graders, and the third for elective classes serving both grades.

== Academic performance ==
Pinkston had been ranked "Improvement Required" by the Texas Education Agency for a three year period from circa 2012 to 2014. Circa 2013 the passing rates of English examinations and mathematics examinations were below 50%. In 2009, the state classified 10% of Pinkston's graduates as "college ready," or ready to undergo university studies. The State of Texas defined "college readiness" by scores on the ACT and SAT and in the 11th grade Texas Assessment of Knowledge and Skills (TAKS) tests. Several DISD schools with demographics similar to that of Pinkston, such as Bryan Adams High School, David W. Carter High School, and Madison High School had higher rates of college readiness than Pinkston. Holly K. Hacker of The Dallas Morning News said that the rate was "a dismal figure even when taking into account the school's poverty and other social challenges." Liliana Valdez, the school district's director of college and career readiness, said that since the 2009 rankings, the district enacted measures at Pinkston to improve the statistics, including the creation of magnet programs for architecture, automotive technology, criminal justice, and law.

After 2014 and by 2018 the rating improved to "Met Standard".

== Demographics ==
Students live in older single-family houses, private apartments, and Dallas Housing Authority public housing. The following DHA properties are zoned to Pinkston for all levels (grades 7-12): the Hamptons at Lakewest, Kingbridge Crossing, Lakeview Townhomes, and Villa Creek Apartments.

In the 2016-2017 school year, about 75% of the students were Hispanic/Latino and about 25% were black. 92% of the students were classified as economically disadvantaged. The 2010 U.S. census stated that the median income of the neighborhood around Pinkston was $11,000, and Bill Zeeble of KERA stated that this was "one of the poorest neighborhoods in Dallas." The economically disadvantaged percentage was an increase from that of the 2006-2007 school year, when 76% of the students were classified as economically disadvantaged.

== Athletics ==
In 1987 John Kincaide, the athletic director of DISD, said that the district is prepared to allow Pinkston to be reclassified by the University Interscholastic League (UIL) from athletic class 5A to athletic class 4A; the UIL had the possibility of demoting the school to athletic class 4A as part of its biannual reclassification. For 2014-2016 UIL classification Pinkston will be 4A instead of 3A.

The L.G. Pinkston Vikings compete in the following sports:

- Baseball
- Basketball
- Cross Country
- Football
- Golf
- Soccer
- Softball
- Tennis
- Track and Field
- Volleyball
- Wrestling

== Notable alumni ==
- Tony Mitchell – former college basketball player for North Texas who was selected 37th overall in the 2013 NBA draft by the Detroit Pistons
- Dink Pate - basketball player
- Regina Taylor – Golden Globe winner, Emmy-nominated actor and playwright
- Donnie Williams – American football player

== See also ==
- African-Americans in Dallas-Fort Worth
