= Census tract =

Geographic region defined for the purpose of taking a census

A census tract, census area, census district, or meshblock is a geographic region defined for the purpose of taking a census. Sometimes these coincide with the limits of cities, towns or other administrative areas and several tracts commonly exist within a county. In unincorporated areas of the United States these are often arbitrary, except for coinciding with political lines.

Census tracts represent the smallest territorial entity for which population data are available in many countries. In the United States, census tracts are subdivided into block groups and census blocks. In Canada, they are divided into dissemination areas. In the U.S., census tracts are "designed to be relatively homogeneous units with respect to population characteristics, economic status, and living conditions" and "average about 4,000 inhabitants".

== By country ==
=== Brazil ===
The Brazilian Institute of Geography and Statistics uses the term census sector (setor censitário). As of the 2022 Census, there were approximately 452,000 sectors in Brazil.

=== Canada ===
Since the 1941 census, Statistics Canada has divided Census Metropolitan Areas (CMAs) and Census Agglomerations (CAs) with core populations over 50,000 into census tracts (French: Secteurs des recensement), geographically small areas intended to contain roughly 5,000 to 7,500 people with similar socioeconomic characteristics. Once a CA has been divided into census tracts (CTs), they will be maintained even if the core population of the CA decreases below 50,000 (CMAs are always divided into CTs regardless of population size).

=== France ===
In 1999 in France, in order to prepare for the dissemination of the 1999 French population census, INSEE (Institut national de la statistique et des études économiques) developed a system for dividing the country into units of equal size, known as IRIS2000, but now known simply as 'IRIS'. The acronym stands for 'Ilots Regroupés pour l'Information Statistique' (‘aggregated units for statistical information') and the 2000 in the name referred not only to the upcoming millennium year but to the target size of 2,000 residents per basic unit. Since 1999, IRIS has represented the fundamental unit for dissemination of infra-municipal data in France and its overseas departments and regions. Towns with more than 10,000 inhabitants, and a large proportion of towns with between 5,000 and 10,000 inhabitants, are divided into several IRIS units. France is composed of around 16,100 IRIS in total, of which 650 are in the overseas departments. There are 3 types of IRIS unit in use: residential IRIS (pop. between 1,800 and 5,000), business IRIS (containing more than 1,000 employees) and miscellaneous IRIS (specific large zones which are sparsely inhabited and have large surface areas (leisure parks, ports, forests etc.).

=== Ireland ===
In the Republic of Ireland, the Central Statistics Office (CSO), established in 1949, organises the census. Beginning from the 2011 census, the CSO website has made available "Small Area Population Statistics" (SAPS) for each "small area", a subdivision of an electoral division (ED) defined by Ordnance Survey Ireland constrained by natural landscape features. Formerly main roads also constrained the borders but this was changed to increase data privacy. A small area has a minimum of 65 and average of 90 households. For the 2016 census there were 18,641 small areas. The 2016 census also provides the population of each of 50,117 townlands, except those with a population of one sex or two people.

From 1926 to 2006, the smallest unit of public reporting was the electoral division (till 1996 called "district electoral divisions" in counties or "wards" in the cities). There were 3,409 EDs in 2016. Until 1911, the smallest reported unit was the townland in rural areas and the ward in urban areas. Subsequently, townland data was available on application to the CSO. All of the aforementioned are legally defined administrative units, although with no local government functions. From 1996 to 2006, "census enumeration areas" were included in data made available on request for areas within the five county boroughs but not the 29 administrative counties. A census enumeration area was the area covered by a single enumerator, and had an average of 330 households. This data has since been published online.

=== New Zealand ===
In New Zealand census tracts are known as meshblocks, or mesh blocks, and are defined by Statistics New Zealand as being "the smallest geographic unit for which statistical data is collected and processed by Statistics New Zealand". It is a defined area, varying in size from part of a city block to large areas of rural land. Each of these borders another to form a network covering the whole country including inlets and coasts, and extending out to the 200 mile economic zone. Meshblocks are added together to "build up" larger geographic areas such as area units and urban areas. They are also used to draw up and define New Zealand electorates and local authority boundaries.

=== United Kingdom ===
British census tracts were first developed in the city of Oxford. The Inter-University Census Tract Committee was formed in 1955 and Oxford was divided into 48 tracts with an average population of 2,645 each. The Registrar General, however, opted for enumeration districts containing less than 1,000 people on average, rather than adopting census tracts. While tracts composed of enumeration districts were later developed, these were not extensively used. Census tracts have, however, been constructed and used by British demographers. The Office for National Statistics now uses enumeration districts only for the collection of data, with output areas used as the base unit in census releases.

=== United States ===
The concept of the census tract was first developed in the United States. In 1906, Walter Laidlaw originated the concept of permanent, small geographic areas as a framework for studying change from one decennial United States Census to another in neighborhoods within New York City. For the 1910 Census, eight cities—New York, Baltimore, Boston, Chicago, Cleveland, Philadelphia, Pittsburgh, and St. Louis—delineated census tracts (then termed ‘‘districts’’) for the first time. No additional jurisdictions delineated census tracts until just prior to the 1930 Census, when an additional ten cities chose to do so. The increased interest in census tracts for the 1930 Census is attributed to the promotional efforts of Howard Whipple Green, who was a statistician in Cleveland, Ohio, and later the chairman of the American Statistical Association's Committee on Census Enumeration Areas. For more than 25 years, Green strongly encouraged local citizens, via committees, to establish census tracts and other census statistical geographic areas. The committees created by local citizens were known as Census Tract Committees, later called Census Statistical Areas Committees.

After 1930, the Census Bureau saw the need to standardize the delineation, review, and updating of census tracts and published the first set of census tract criteria in 1934. The goal of the criteria has remained unchanged; that is, to assure comparability and data reliability through the standardization of the population thresholds for census tracts, as well as requiring that their boundaries follow specific types of geographic features that do not change frequently. The Census Bureau began publishing census tract data as part of its standard tabulations beginning with the 1940 Census. Prior to that time, census tract data were published as special tabulations.

For the 1940 Census, the Census Bureau began publishing census block data for all cities with 50,000 or more people. Census block numbers were assigned, where possible, by census tract, but for those cities that had not yet delineated census tracts, ‘‘block areas’’ (called ‘‘block numbering areas’’ [BNAs] in later censuses) were created to assign census block numbers. Starting with the 1960 Census, the Census Bureau assumed a greater role in promoting and coordinating the delineation, review, and update of census tracts. For the 1980 Census, criteria for BNAs were changed to make them more comparable in size and shape to census tracts. For the 1990 Census, all counties contained either census tracts or BNAs.

Census 2000 was the first decade in which census tracts were defined in all counties. In addition, the Census Bureau increased the number of geographic areas whose boundaries could be used as census tract boundaries. It also allowed tribal governments of federally recognized American Indian tribes with a reservation and/or off-reservation trust lands to delineate tracts without regard to State and/or county boundaries, provided the tribe had a 1990 Census population of at least 1,000.

Census tracts are also used by the Small Business Administration to define boundaries of HUBZones.

In Alaska, the equivalent term is census areas in the Unorganized Borough.
