= DATCU Stadium =

College football stadium in Denton, Texas, United States

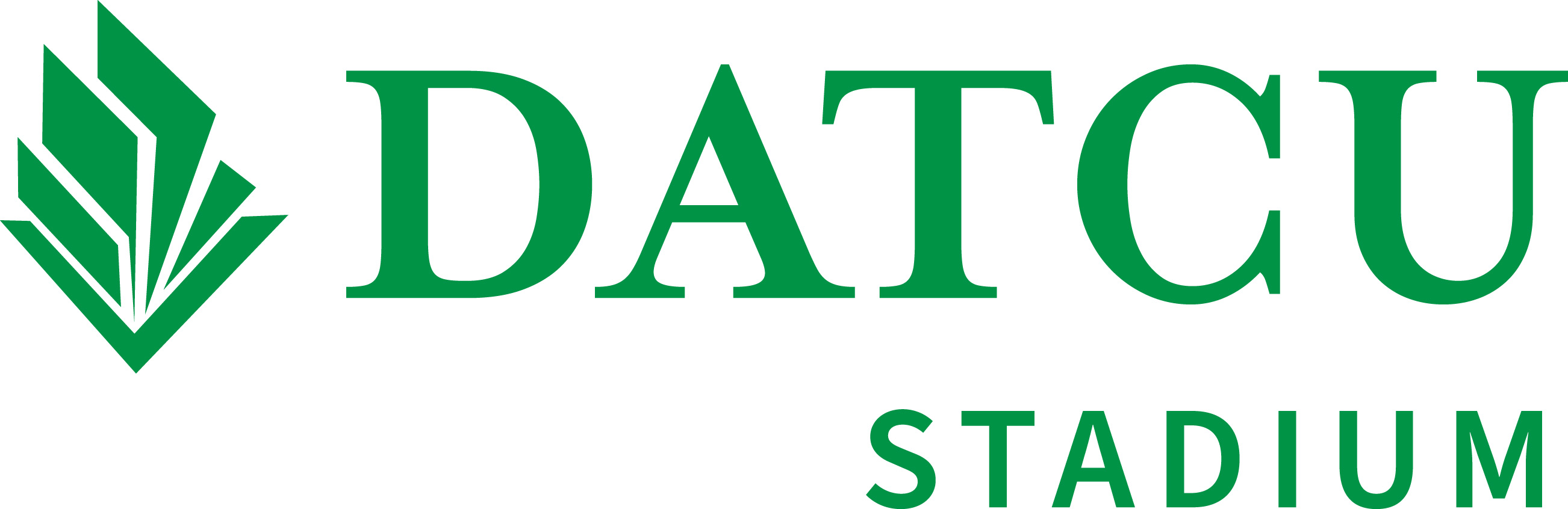

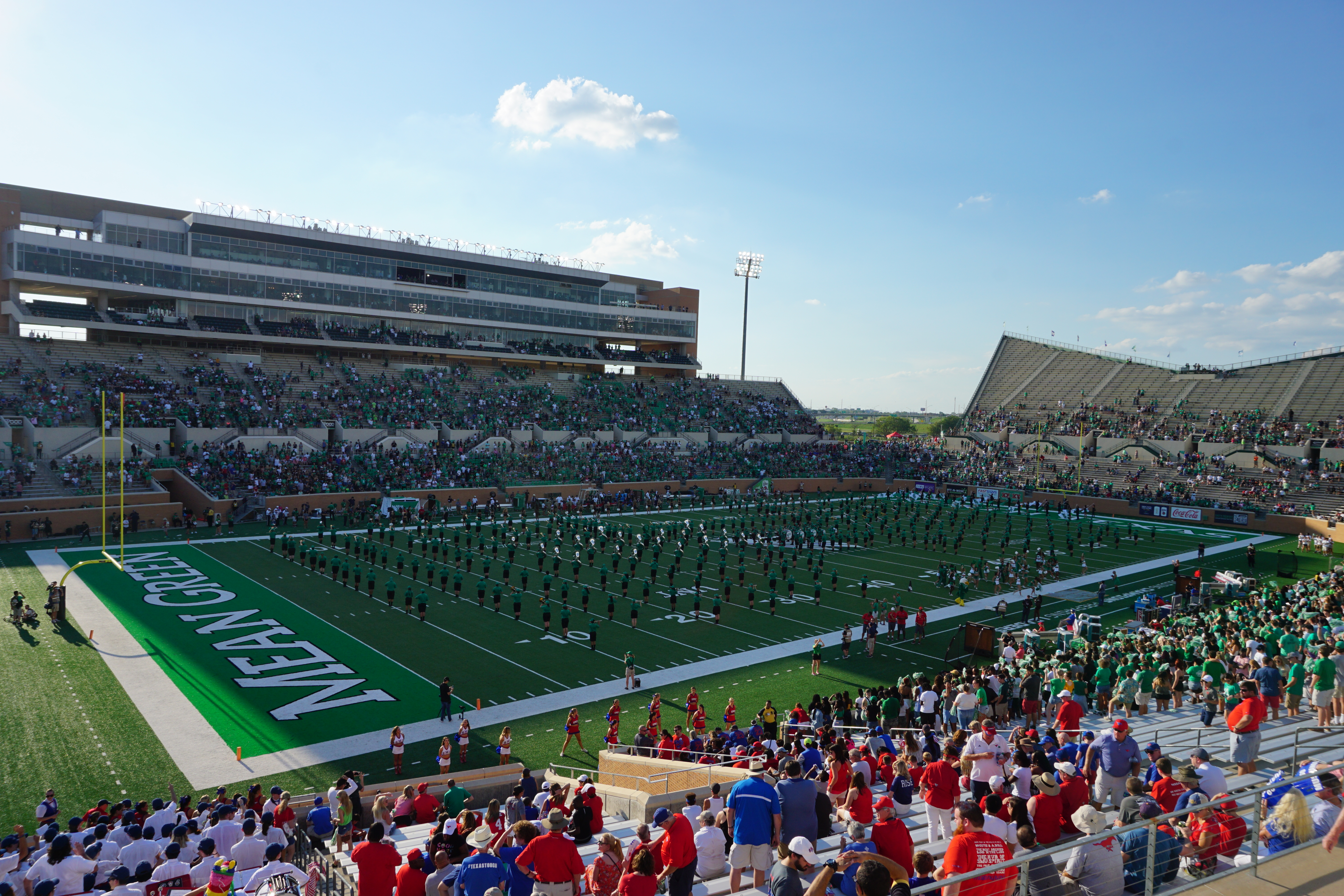
- The Green Brigade Marching Band performing at DATCU Stadium before the Safeway Bowl

- Location in Texas Location in the United States
- Former names: Mean Green Stadium (planning); Apogee Stadium (2011–2023)
- Location: 1251 S. Bonnie Brae Street; Denton, Texas, US 76207
- Coordinates: 33°12′13″N 97°9′34″W
- Owner: University of North Texas System
- Operator: University of North Texas Athletic Department
- Capacity: 30,100 (2024–present); 30,850 (2011–2023)
- Executive suites: 21
- Surface: PowerBlade HP + artificial turf
- Scoreboard: 47 ft × 27 ft (14.3 m × 8.2 m) (primary); 27 ft × 15 ft (8.2 m × 4.6 m) (secondary)
- Record attendance: 31,386 vs. University of South Florida; October 10, 2025
- Field size: 360 feet (110 m) x 160 feet (49 m)
- Acreage: 46 acres (19 ha)
- Public transit: Downtown Denton Transit Center (shuttle to stadium)

Construction
- Groundbreaking: November 21, 2009
- Built: 2009–2011
- Opened: September 10, 2011
- Cost: $78 million ($117 million in 2025 dollars)
- Architect: HKS, Inc.
- Project manager: Greg Whittemore
- Structural engineers: Rogers Moore Engineers; Walter P Moore Engineers and Consultants
- Services engineer: Henneman Engineering
- General contractor: Manhattan Construction Company

Tenant
- North Texas Mean Green football (2011–present)

Website
- meangreensports.com/facilities/datcu-stadium/4

DATCU Stadium (formerly Apogee Stadium) is a college football stadium located at the north junction of Interstate 35E and Interstate 35W in Denton, Texas, United States. Opened in 2011, it is home to the University of North Texas (UNT) Mean Green football team, which competes in the American Athletic Conference. The facility replaced Fouts Field, where the school's football program had been based since 1952.

The stadium was proposed by the Board of Regents of the University of North Texas System after the 2002 New Orleans Bowl. Designed by HKS, Inc., it was constructed at a cost of $78 million after a student body election in 2008. It was tentatively named "Mean Green Stadium" prior to ResNet provider Apogee purchasing the naming rights in 2011. DATCU Credit Union (DATCU, formerly Denton Area Teachers Credit Union) subsequently purchased naming rights to the facility prior to the 2023 season. The stadium hosted its first major event on September 10, 2011, when the Mean Green lost 48–23 against the University of Houston Cougars. Official home attendance figures for the team's first six seasons at DATCU Stadium averaged 18,737 per game, which was 60.7% of its initial capacity of 30,850 until seating was reduced in 2024 to the current capacity of 30,100.

The facility includes various amenities, including a press box, luxury boxes, and an alumni pavilion. It also uses environmental technology: it is the first newly built stadium to achieve Leadership in Energy and Environmental Design (LEED) Platinum certification. It can be reached by road, but because of limited parking and traffic congestion on game days, many attendees park on the northeast side of Interstate 35E and cross a pedestrian bridge to reach the stadium. Others use public transportation to reach the facility on game days.

== History ==
=== Early planning and finance ===
In September 2002, the University of North Texas purchased 19 acres (7.7 ha) on the opposite side of Interstate 35E from the main campus in Denton from Liberty Christian School for $5.1 million. The university also owned an adjacent 158-acre (64 ha) golf course. Following the football team's victory at the 2002 New Orleans Bowl, school administrators announced their intent to build an assortment of new athletic facilities on the properties, now called the Mean Green Village. These plans included a new football stadium to replace Fouts Field, where the school's football team had been based since 1952. Richard Raefs, vice chancellor of administrative affairs at UNT, stated that the project's primary objective was the consolidation of academic facilities and that renovating Fouts Field would cost $8 million more than building an entirely new stadium.

The Board of Regents of the University of North Texas System released a long-term campus master plan in 2005 that included a proposed new stadium with a capacity of 35,000 and an estimated cost "in excess of $35 million". UNT athletic director Rick Villareal stated that the university would use only private fundraising, rather than another increase in students' fees, to pay for any new facilities, including a stadium. He projected that the new stadium would cost $40 million and seat 50,000 spectators. The athletic department changed that capacity estimate in 2007 to 32,000 with the possibility of later expansion to 50,000.

=== Athletics fee referendum ===
Choice	Votes	%
For	2,829	58.13
Against	2,038	41.87
Total	4,867	100.00
Registered voters/turnout		13.9

In 2008, the athletic department tried again to increase the athletics fee to pay for the new stadium, which now had an estimated cost of $60 million. UNT Student Government Association (SGA) student senators voted to hold a student election on the referendum to approve the new fee, which amounted to a net increase of $7 per credit hour for each student, or approximately $840 per student over the course of four years. According to state law, students cannot pay for more than half the cost of a stadium.

The athletic department made a concerted effort to promote the higher fee to students, and supporters suggested hiring street preachers or troubadours to promote the election. Making the case for the fee prior to the election, athletic director Rick Villareal said that the stadium was "not some arms race for us" and that the fee's objective was not just to keep up with other universities.

The referendum was held between October 13–17, 2008. Students voted for or against the proposal:

In order for the University of North Texas to have a better Athletic program, which in turn can lead to national exposure and increased recognition of UNT; I agree to a dedicated Athletic Fee not to exceed $10 per semester credit hour, capped at 15 hours. Once the Athletic Fee is implemented, the Student Service Fee will be reduced by $3 per semester credit hour. The Athletic Fee shall not be implemented until the semester the new football stadium is complete, which is expected to be fall 2011.

On October 21, 2008, the UNT SGA announced that in one of the largest turnouts in the school's history, student voters approved a dedicated athletic fee to fund the new stadium. Almost 14% of the student body voted, with 2,829 students (58.1%) voting for the increase and 2,038 (41.9%) voting against it. After the election, the cost estimate for the stadium's construction increased by $18 million to $78 million, $38 million more than the 2005 estimate. At a press conference with head football coach Todd Dodge, Villarreal stated that "there's an arms race going on with facilities. This one will put us up there with everybody else." In February 2009, the school's chapter of Students for a Democratic Society unsuccessfully attempted to petition for a re-vote on the referendum.

Following the election, Representative Myra Crownover and Senator Craig Estes submitted companion bills during the eighty-first Texas Legislature to approve the fee increase. According to the report submitted by Crownover to the state's Higher Education Committee, the fee would not begin until construction of the new stadium was complete. As a result of the fee, the athletics department would collect approximately $8.7 million from students in 2012, of which $3.9 million would be put towards payment of the new stadium. Estes' bill was approved by the Texas House and Senate, and was signed into law by Governor Rick Perry on May 23, 2009. Prior to the groundbreaking ceremony on November 21, 2009, President of UNT Gretchen Bataille said that of the approximately $78 million needed to pay for the new stadium, the department had raised $5 million. In 2015, the eighty-fourth Texas Legislature passed a bill allowing the Board of Regents to raise the fee by up to 10% each year beyond the original limit of $10. In September 2015, the Board of Regents approved an increase in the fee, raising it to $11 per credit hour.

=== Construction and naming rights ===
In February 2008, the school selected HKS, Inc. to provide architectural and design services for the proposed new stadium. The university hired Manhattan Construction Company in 2009 to provide pre-construction and construction services. After leveling the area, Manhattan installed a steel-reinforced concrete skeleton for the stands. Subsequently, the firm flattened the playing field area and installed artificial turf. In later phases, glass and brick were added to the facility's luxury suites. Construction officially finished on July 20, 2011.

On August 11, 2011, UNT announced a deal with Austin-based ResNet provider Apogee for the naming rights to the new stadium, and the name was changed to "Apogee Stadium". According to the contract, Apogee will pay $11.8 million of the $20 million deal in cash over 20 years, including graduated annual payments beginning at $312,000 and ending in three payments of $1 million. The remaining $8.29 million will be in the form of in-kind services. As part of the contract, Apogee also received one luxury suite in the new stadium and premium tickets to other UNT events. Apogee chose to end its agreement in 2023. On July 31, a new naming rights agreement was made with DATCU credit union.

=== Opening season ===
Average attendance (by season) of all North Texas Mean Green football home games at Apogee Stadium between 2011 and 2020

The stadium hosted its first game on September 10, 2011, when the Mean Green football team lost 48–23 against the University of Houston Cougars. Despite the concerted efforts of the university and the athletic department, the first home game at the new stadium did not sell out, and the game attracted 28,075 spectators, 2,775 fewer than full capacity. Although attendees' reception to the opening game was generally positive, attendance dropped to 21,181 for the second home game against the Indiana University Hoosiers. By the third home game against the Florida Atlantic University Owls, attendance had dropped to a season-low of 13,142. To promote the final home game of the season against the Middle Tennessee State University Blue Raiders, the university offered free tickets to some athletic booster club members, and head football coach Dan McCarney promoted the game with an op-ed in the school's student newspaper, the North Texas Daily. The official attendance for the final game was 15,962, bringing the total home attendance for the year to 113,186, a new record for the Mean Green. For the 2011 season, the stadium averaged 18,864 spectators per home game, which is 61.15% of the facility's capacity of at the time of 30,850. T (FBS) teams in average home attendance. It finished with five wins and seven losses, its best record since the 2004 season.

=== Later events ===
For the five home games of the 2012 season, average game attendance saw a slight increase to 18,927, giving the Mean Green the 103rd highest attendance out of 124 FBS teams. The venue hosted its first nationally televised game on October 16, 2012, when the Mean Green defeated the Louisiana–Lafayette Ragin' Cajuns 30–23 on ESPN2. The broadcast had an estimated 366,000 viewers, earning a Nielsen rating of 0.3. The 2013 season began with a home game celebrating 100 years of football at North Texas; an announced crowd of 21,975 watched the Mean Green defeat the Idaho Vandals 40–6. For the six home games of the 2013 season, average game attendance at Apogee was 21,030. The venue averaged 19,271 attendees per home game during the 2014 season. Attendance dropped to 13,631 for the 2015 season, the school's lowest average since 1998. That average improved to 19,843 for the 2016 season.

Top Ten DATCU Stadium Crowds
Rank	Game	Date	Attendance
1	UNT vs South Florida	October 10, 2025	31,386
2	UNT vs Houston	September 28, 2019	30,123
3	UNT vs Louisiana Tech	September 29, 2018	30,105
4	UNT vs SMU	September 1, 2018	29,519
5	UNT vs Army	November 9, 2024	28,519
6	UNT vs Houston	September 10, 2011	28,075
7	UNT vs Wyoming	September 21, 2024	27,049
8	UNT vs. Washington State	September 13, 2025	26,837
9	UNT vs Navy	November 1, 2025	26,516
10	UNT vs Army	November 18, 2017	26,392

=== Other uses ===
Other events at the stadium include an annual Independence Day fireworks show, hosted by the local Kiwanis organization. The stadium also hosted Bands of America regional marching band competitions in 2012 and 2014 The facility also hosts a number of high school football contests each year, including playoff games. The venue hosted a 5K run in 2016, coinciding with that year's spring game.

On March 25, 2017, the stadium hosted an exclusive concert for university students, staff, and alumni. The concert featured the Eli Young Band as the main act, with Midland and Macy Maloy as the opening acts.

== Structure and facilities ==
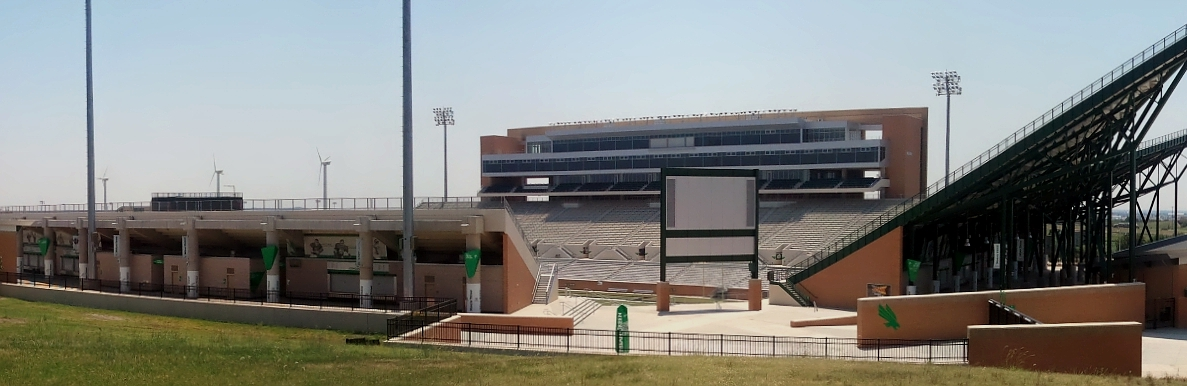
View from "The Hill", a tailgating area northeast of the stadium, with three wind turbines in the distance on the left, luxury boxes center, and V-shaped stands on the right

A member of the UNT Talons, a school spirit group, fires Boomer the Cannon behind the south end zone.

DATCU Stadium occupies 426,300 square feet (39,600 m^{2}) on 46 acres (19 ha) of land. Stands on the north, east, and west sides of the stadium seat 30,100 and form a horseshoe shape around a standard American football field. The field's surface is PowerBlade HP +, a type of artificial turf comprising synthetic fibers with a rubber and sand infill. Unlike Fouts Field, DATCU Stadium does not have an all-weather running track, and spectators are set approximately 33 feet (10 m) closer to the field. A separate 2,500-square-foot (230 m^{2}) pavilion for alumni is located just north of the stadium. Parts of the stadium's exterior are covered with 48,320 square feet (4,489 m^{2}) of recyclable silver aluminum composite panels, with an additional 1,334 square feet (123.9 m^{2}) of green panels for accent.

The home side stands are located on the west side of the stadium. They include 21 luxury suites, which the athletic department sells for $20,000 per year plus a "6- or 7-figure gift to the Stadium Fund", and 754 club seats, which can be purchased with a one-time gift of $3,125 to $12,500, in addition to an annual $500 donation to the athletic department and the cost of season tickets. The side also includes a press box, named the Bill Mercer Press Club, in honor of the school's longtime play-by-play announcer. Barnes & Noble College Booksellers operates a Mean Green Gear Store, which is located underneath the stands at Gate 2 on the west side of the stadium.

The stands on the east side of the field are generally reserved for student seating; behind them is a path-defined tailgating area called "The Hill". The seating behind the north end zone forms a distinctive "V" shape intended to resemble an eagle's wings in flight. The tips of the "wings" reach 106 feet (32 m) above the field. There is no seating behind the south end zone, but the area includes a 47-by-27-foot (14.3 m × 8.2 m) scoreboard and a 5-foot (1.5 m) bronze bust of an eagle. The bust is named "Spiriki", and was donated by members of the Geezles, the school's first social fraternity. On game days, the area also includes a scale replica cannon named "Boomer", which is fired each time the team scores. The stadium opened in 2011 with a seating capacity of 30,850 and was reduced to 30,100 since 2024, after the installation of new chairbacks in multiple sections on the west side of the stadium."DATCU Stadium". University of North Texas Athletics. December 10, 2021.

=== Environmental design ===
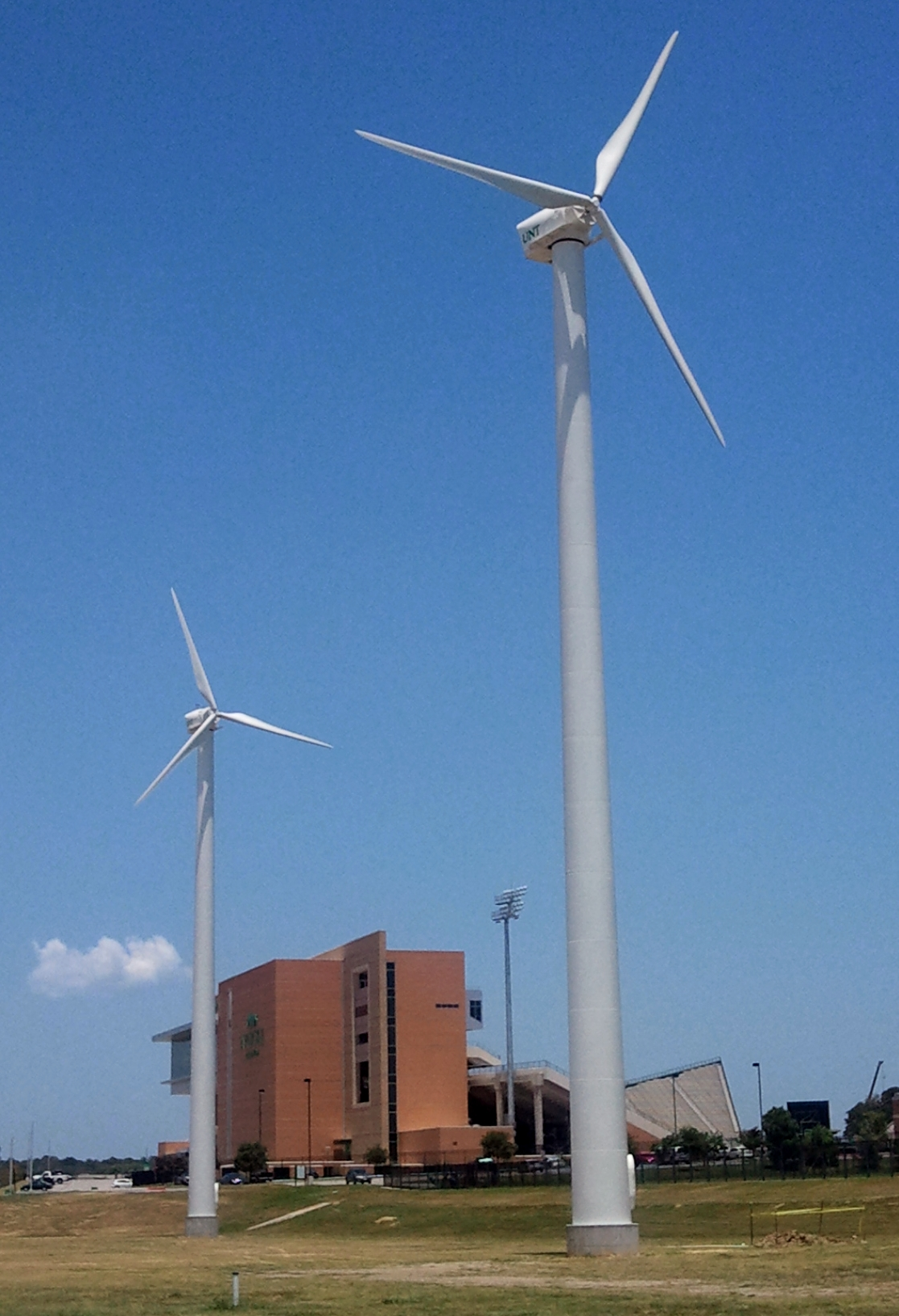
Two of three university-owned turbines generating wind power for the stadium's electrical grid

In 2008, president of UNT Gretchen Bataille signed the American College and University President's Climate Commitment (ACUPCC) to achieve carbon neutrality by 2040. As part of that process, all new university buildings and facilities are required to achieve a minimum of Leadership in Energy and Environmental Design (LEED) Silver certification. While planning the stadium's construction, the university consulted HKS, Inc. to design it to meet a number of green building standards and hired FocusEGD, an environmental graphic design firm, to design many of the stadium's graphic elements. As a result, DATCU Stadium uses various forms of environmental technology. To reduce water consumption and urban runoff, the facility includes a 85,000-square-foot (7,900 m^{2}) water retention system, 338,000 square feet (31,400 m^{2}) of permeable paving, and low-flow plumbing systems. To minimize the human impact on the environment, developers took advantage of the landscape around the stadium whenever possible.

The facility also includes three Northern Power Systems 100 wind turbines, which were installed in February 2012. To fund the turbine project, the Texas State Energy Conservation Office allocated $2 million in federal stimulus funds to the university. The 120-foot (37 m) turbines each have three 30-foot (9.1 m) blades and are expected to produce a combined 450,000 kilowatt-hours (1,600 GJ) of energy per year, which would account for roughly six percent of the athletics department's power grid in the area. The turbines are also expected to offset 323 metric tons (323,000 kg) of carbon dioxide emissions.

The stadium's sustainable design features have earned praise and awards from media outlets and industry groups. In 2011, DATCU Stadium became the first newly built stadium to achieve LEED Platinum certification, the highest level awarded by the U.S. Green Building Council. The points-based ratings system measures various environmental aspects including water efficiency, energy conservation, indoor air quality, and sustainability. Dallas Business Journal named the stadium the "Green Project Deal of the Year" in 2012, and Engineering News-Record named it the year's "Best Green Project". The stadium was named as one of the four finalists during the World Stadium Awards Congress for "most sustainable stadium design concept", but lost to the London Olympic Stadium.

== Transportation and location ==
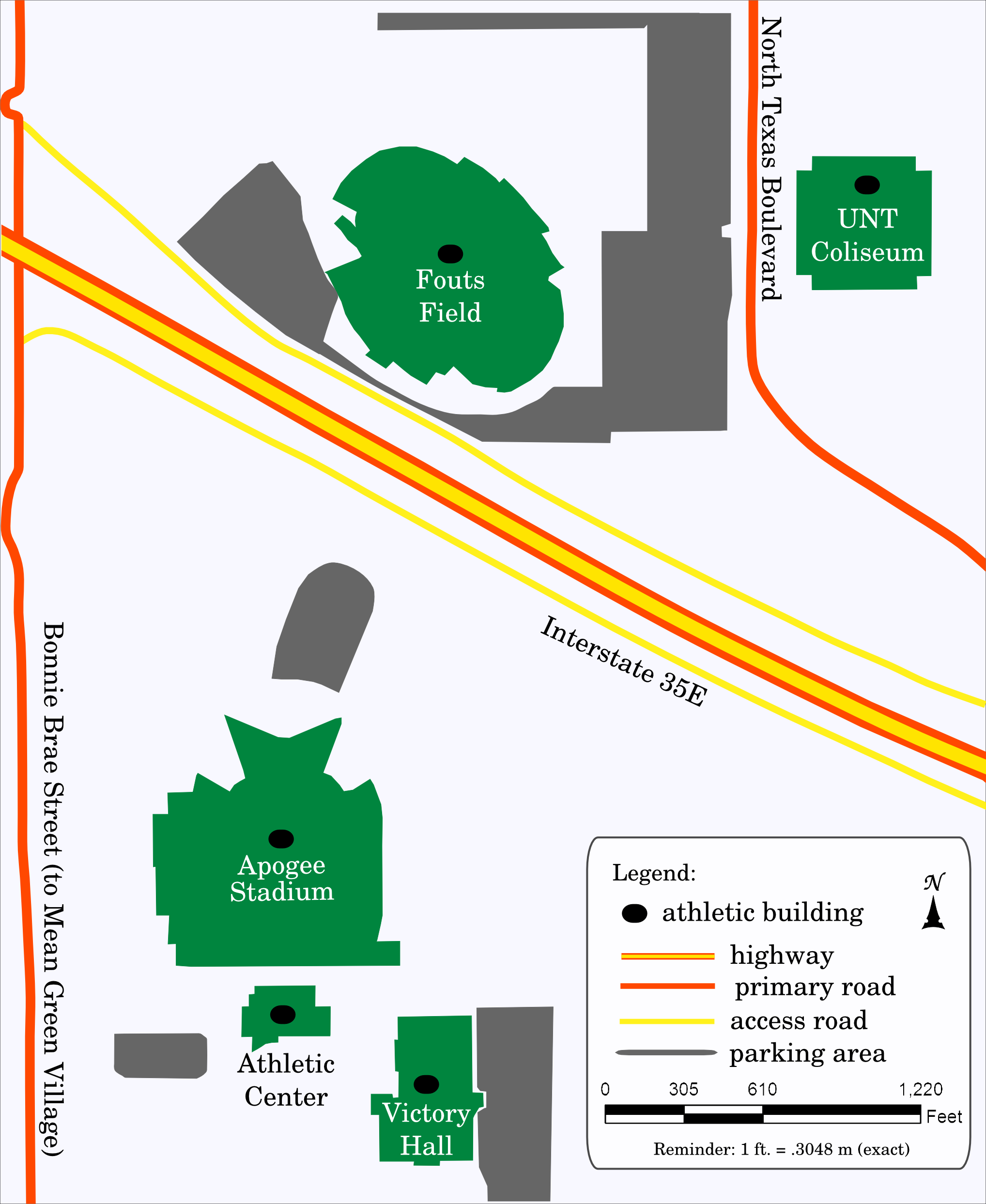
Image map of North Texas Mean Green athletic facilities on either side of Interstate 35E in Denton

DATCU Stadium is located on Bonnie Brae Street at the junction of Interstate 35 East and West in the southeast part of Denton, Texas. It is part of the Mean Green Village, a 175-acre (71 ha) parcel of land located south of UNT's main campus that includes various athletic department facilities. In February 2003, the school conducted studies to identify potential traffic problems in the area. The results of the studies indicated that the intersection of Bonnie Brae Street and Airport Road northwest of the facility represented a potential major traffic hazard, since the two-lane Bonnie Brae Street could not accommodate the additional game day traffic, and Airport Road would be needed for access to Denton Municipal Airport to the north. Initially, university officials planned to address some concerns by rerouting season ticket holders through the surrounding neighborhoods, but in 2009, residents expressed concerns that the stadium could clog traffic systems in the area. Consequently, the City of Denton passed an ordinance to shut down the area streets on game days to anyone without a resident's permit. The university began the process of transferring the right-of-way surrounding Bonnie Brae Street to the city in 2012 to allow for the road's expansion from two lanes to four. The project is expected to improve the region's transportation system between Interstate 35 East and U.S. Route 377 to the south.

To encourage the use of sustainable transportation, developers limited the quantity of parking spaces on site. The facility includes 1,758 parking spaces adjacent to the stadium, but to access it on the day of an event, most attendees park at Fouts Field on the opposite side of Interstate 35E and walk across a pedestrian bridge, which leads to the stadium. The university announced plans to build the bridge in August 2011 to address another area of the concern from the 2002 studies. Construction on the $2.5 million project, a joint venture between the university and the Texas Department of Transportation, began in February 2012. Although originally expected to open for the football team's first home game of the 2012 season, construction delays moved the opening date to October 16 for the third home game of the season.

In June 2016, Trinity Metro announced its intent to begin operating a commuter bus service on weekdays from Fort Worth Central Station to the stadium parking lot. The Denton County Transportation Authority (DCTA) is expected to review the proposal on August 22, 2016. On game days, UNT football game attendees can also take the DCTA A-train to the Euline Brock Downtown Denton Transit Center and take a shuttle to Fouts Field, where they can walk to the stadium. Beginning two hours prior to the beginning of each game and ending one hour after the game is over, the Mean Green Game Day shuttle also stops at various locations in Denton, including the Denton County Courthouse-on-the-Square and the southeast corner of the university. In September 2013, the school announced a partnership with DCTA to provide free trips on the A-train and shuttle rides to the stadium for football game attendees wearing UNT apparel.

== See also ==
- List of NCAA Division I FBS football stadiums
- Lists of stadiums
