= Mean Green Village =

Athletic facilities in Denton, Texas

Coordinates: 33°12′7″N 97°9′33″W

The Mean Green Village is a collection of athletic facilities in Denton, Texas. It is located on the opposite side of Interstate 35 in Texas from the University of North Texas campus at the intersection of Interstate 35 East and West. Since 2002, several buildings have been completed, including athletic department offices, softball and soccer fields, a running track, and a tennis complex. DATCU Stadium, UNT's new football stadium, is located in the Mean Green Village. The stadium seats 30,100 and has 21 luxury boxes as of 2024. It is the nation's first newly built platinum-certified Leadership in Energy and Environmental Design stadium.
