= Texas Health Presbyterian Hospital Denton =

Hospital in North Texas and southern Oklahoma

Coordinates: 33.217475°N 97.165396°W

- Industry: Health care
- Founded: 1987
- Headquarters: Denton, Texas, United States
- Area served: North Texas and Southern Oklahoma
- Number of employees: 1,076 (2017)
- Website: http://www.dentonhospital.com

Texas Health Presbyterian Hospital Denton (formerly Denton Community Hospital and Presbyterian Hospital of Denton) is a hospital in North Texas and southern Oklahoma. With over 890 employees and a medical staff of more than 300, the 272,538-square-foot (25,319.6 m^{2}) hospital is licensed for 255 beds, and is accredited by the Joint Commission on Accreditation of Health Care Organizations (JCAHO).

== Services ==
Texas Health Presbyterian Hospital Denton is home to a Women's Imaging Center, The Center for Women. This facility includes 11 Labor, Delivery & Recovery Suites, 26 private postpartum rooms; a 20-bed nursery, and a Level III 10-bed Neonatal Intensive Care Unit. The Center for Women is a certified Softer Mammogram Provider, that includes mammography, bone densitometry, ultrasound, and a stereotactic breast biopsy suite.
