= Denton Community Theatre =

Coordinates: 33.2148°N 97.1345°W

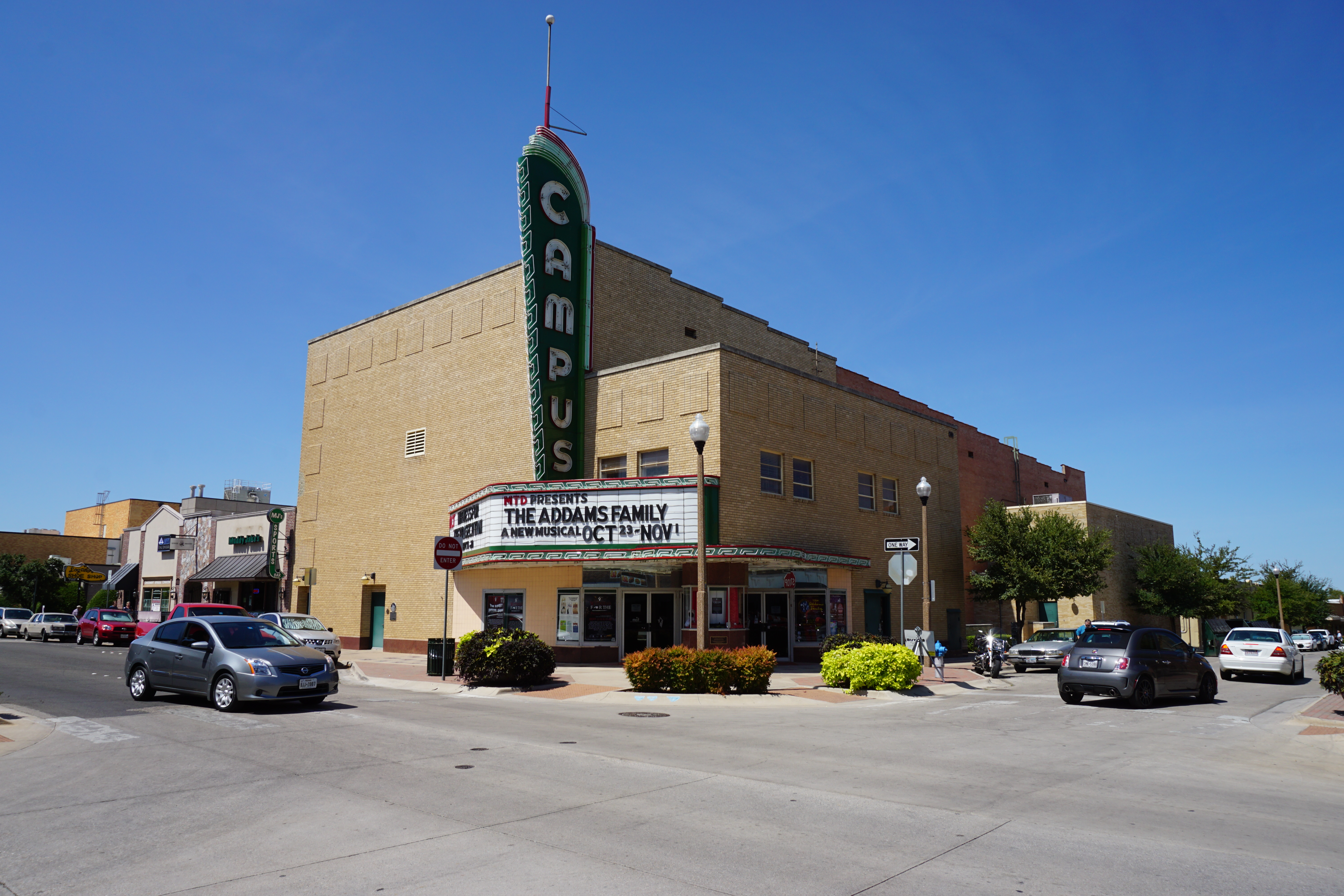
Campus Theatre in Denton, home of the Denton Community Theatre

The Denton Community Theatre was a local theatre company located in Denton, Texas in the United States. It serves as one of the oldest community theatres in the North Texas area having been in existence since 1969. It is located at the historic Campus Theatre on West Hickory Street. In 2020, it merged with another local theatre company (Music Theatre of Denton) to form a new company - Theatre Denton.

Throughout the Denton community, people, businesses, and educators are working together to better implement the arts into the Northern Texas area. The goal is to develop a more livable community by supporting the growth and more responsive use of artistic and cultural resources that exist in Denton.

== History ==
The Campus Theatre was a classic movie house built in 1949. Denton needed a movie theatre that would cater to the "students on campus" (University of North Texas and Texas Woman’s University). The Campus Theatre was built, one of several state-of-the-art movie houses in the southwest at the time of its construction. The Campus Theatre remained open as a movie house until 1985. It had been a place to go on weekends to see picture shows, bring dates, and watch the latest movies in the grand theatre. The Campus Theatre now left alone, needed a new owner.

DCT has conducted numerous educational programs, both artistic and theatrical, for children and adults of all socio-economic levels, nationalities and races.

With a journey to find its permanent theatrical home, DCT first leased the Firehouse Theatre, which is now known as Central Fire Station. It then moved to the Denton Civic Center, which could not facilitate many of its productions. The DCT was in need of a new residence.

In 1990, DCT found a new home through the Campus Theatre. DCT saw the potential and renovation of the building as beneficial to all the arts organizations and groups in Denton. DCT proposed that the Greater Denton Arts Council expand the Arts Complex to include the Campus Theatre.

Late 1990, the Campus Theatre was purchased by GDAC. An architect was hired and plans for renovating the building were developed. DCT leased the building from GDAC, and is the resident and managing company since construction was completed in May 1995.

In 2011, DCT opened its PointBank Black box theater for extra rehearsal space and their ever-growing Theatre School program, as well as a possible alternative performance venue.
