= Bob Castleberry =

- Born: Robert Castleberry; August 10, 1929; Denton, TX
- Died: October 21, 2004 (aged 75); Denton, TX
- Known for: Winning lottery, Former mayor of Denton, TX

Bob Castleberry (August 10, 1929 – October 21, 2004) was a former contest winner and the former mayor of Denton, Texas. Less than a year previous to his election, Castleberry won the Publishers Clearing House $10 million sweepstakes.

== Early life ==
Castleberry was born in 1929 in Denton, Texas to parents Claude and Isla Castleberry. His father, Claude served on the city council of Denton from 1929 to 1930 and again in the 1950s. Previous to winning the lottery Castleberry worked in sales and was planning to retire at the age of 62 before winning the sweepstakes at age 59.

== Sweepstakes win ==
In March 1989, Castleberry won the Publishers Clearing House sweepstakes jackpot of $10 million. Castleberry had been entering the sweepstakes every year since 1967. The winning numbers were broadcast on TV that evening. To ensure Castleberry was in front of the TV to see the numbers he was lured into watching television for a promised $200 reward for evaluating advertisements.

== Mayoral race and election ==
In January 1990, less than a year after winning the sweepstakes, Castleberry announced that he would be running for mayor of his hometown of Denton, TX. Castleberry cited his father's involvement with the city as a reason for choosing to run. Castleberry received plenty of exposure on television during the campaign due to being part of Publisher's commercials announcing the winner which helped boost his visibility to voters. He beat two-term incumbent Ray Stephens 50 percent to 45 and entered office in May 1990. Castleberry served as mayor until 1996.

== Later life and death ==
In addition to purchasing a Rolls-Royce and two ranches, Castleberry started scholarships in the name of his parents and brother at three Texas universities: Texas A&M University, University of North Texas and Texas Woman's University. The latter two universities are both situated in Denton. Castleberry continued to live in Denton until his death from natural causes in October 2004.
