= NTTV =

North Texas Television (NTTV)
- Denton, Texas; United States
- City: Denton, Texas
- Channels: Analog: 22 (Spectrum), 46 (Verizon FiOS)

Programming
- Affiliations: Zilo TV, National Lampoon Network

Ownership
- Owner: University of North Texas

History
- Founded: c. 1980
- Call sign meaning: North Texas; TeleVision

Links
- Website: https://www.northtexastelevision.com/

NTTV (North Texas Television) is a student television station at the University of North Texas in Denton, Texas, and is multicast locally on Spectrum channel 22 as well as on Verizon FiOS channel 46.

Run by volunteers, student staff and a faculty station manager, NTTV airs programming produced by (and geared toward) students. The station has also aired programming from National Lampoon Networks, Zilo, and other universities. Since 2004, NTTV has broadcast 24/7, and typically has 15 student shows in production each Fall and Spring semester, totaling over 100 hours of content.

In 2005, 2006, and 2007, NTTV won Lone Star Emmy awards for original entertainment programming and, in 2009 and 2010, won Emmys for original news coverage in both live and packaged formats.

== NTTV's Productions ==
=== ntTV News ===
ntTV Nightly News

ntTV Nightly News is UNT's half-hour, student-produced newscast that airs live at 6:00 PM CST, Monday through Thursday. The news broadcast has won Lone Star Emmy awards in 2009, 2010, and 2013.

ntTv Noon News

ntTV Noon News is UNT's student-produced news cast that airs live at 12:00 PM CST, Monday through Thursday.

=== Currently Produced Programming: Entertainment ===
All That and a Bag of Chips

All That and a Bag of Chips is ntTV's game show program, where viewers can watch as their peers compete in several rounds of games, competing for first place.

Ardillando

Ardillando is the only Spanish show on ntTV Entertainment. Focusing on the culture of Denton, Ardillando explores music, food, and more on their programs.

Jibber Jabber

Jibber Jabber is a short form content show made for Instagram reels and an on-set, interactive production promoting ntTV. A host and co-host interview UNT students and ask them, “Would you do something?” – A series of absurdly wild questions.

Late Night @ North Texas

Late Night @ North Texas is a late evening talk show featuring a host along with guests and correspondents, similar to Jimmy Fallon or Jimmy Kimmel. Late Night @ North Texas is a winning combination of news, sketch comedy, and entertaining interviews, featuring performances by local Denton musicians and entertainers. So join us for Denton’s only Late Night Talk show!

Looking Glass

Looking Glass is a sci-fi horror anthology series following multiple characters in standalone stories experiencing mysterious and compelling situations. Similar to Black Mirror and The Twilight Zone.

Prove It or Lose It

Prove It or Lose It is a sports gaming show that tests not only contestants’ knowledge of the sports industry, but also their force of will, through debate. Analysts have to prove their point, or they “lose it” and get eliminated.

The Black Tape Catalog

The Black Tape Catalog is a found-footage horror anthology. Each episode uses a handheld VHS approach, telling the story of mysterious encounters with the supernatural.

Skullduggery

Skullduggery is a comedy sitcom following the lives of a series of college students, who find themselves in a new predicament each episode.

My Boyfriend is a Whom?!

Formerly titled "My Girlfriend is a What?!", My Boyfriend is a Whom?! is a narrative show following the exploits of a human main character, usually attempting to unravel the supernatural mystery of their titular partner.

UNTalk

UNTalk is a podcast show, often interviewing various groups and clubs around the Denton area.

=== Currently Produced Programming: Sports ===
Mean Green Gameday

Mean Green Gameday is a pre-game show broadcast live on-site at either Apogee Stadium or the Super Pit on days of North Texas home games. The show was created in 2016 and uses a student built set and production truck to carry out broadcasts. Over the shows young history, it has seen some high-profile guests such as NFL Hall of Famer, "Mean" Joe Greene, UNT President Neal Smatresk, and North Texas Athletic Director Wren Baker, all on the show's prediction segment. The show was founded by current Dallas Cowboys host and North Texas graduate, Kyle Youmans.

Sports Zone (formerly Mean Green Sports Zone)

Sports Zone is ntTV's sports magazine program. The show provides sports analysis on UNT's 12 sports programs as well as local high school and college sports. The talent provides their opinions on the latest topics in sports, while recapping the progress of the university's sports teams during their respective seasons. The show also features a segment called Overtime, where anchors and reporters share their views in rapid-fire succession on the latest in sports.

NTTV Sports

NTTV Sports covers several of the university's home basketball games live from the UNT SuperPit. All the features of a major network basketball broadcast are present, including play-by-play, color commentating, multiple camera angles, replay capability, and a complete graphics package with a scoreboard and game-clock. In 2007, the basketball crew was used to broadcast the Heartland Conference basketball tournament online as well as on the station. In addition, NTTV broadcast 2 Mean Green football games in 2013: the August 31st matchup against Idaho, and the October 12th game against Middle Tennessee. They also broadcast their 2014 and 2015 spring games, as well as their home game against Portland State in 2015.

=== Shows No Longer in Production But Currently On Air ===
The _____ Agency

The _____ Agency is a series about a group of students who form an agency which tailors to the individual needs of its clients.

Axion Maxima

Axion Maxima is the first series on the network in which Spanish is the primary language. The series tours the Metroplex, highlighting things to do in the North Texas area.

Eagle Access

Eagle Access is a student-affairs series which covers events surrounding the university, and features interviews with the Student Government Association president as well as the faculty.

North Texas Sports Zone

North Texas Sports Zone is a weekly sports highlight series that features University of North Texas sports and Denton area high school athletics. The series is managed by the student Sports Director in the fall, and by the Assistant Sports Director in the spring.

Breaking News

Breaking News is a comedy series which parodies news programs, and holds the distinction of being the first entertainment program to air live on the network. The live episode of the series was created as a special project in UNT's Advanced Video Production course in the fall of 2005.

Deadly Cinema

Deadly Cinema is a comedy horror series about the adventures of host Jami Deadly, who lives in an unknown cemetery along with her neighborhood friends. The series won a Texas Intercollegiate Press Association award for "Best Television Production" in 2005.

Elvis and Slick Monty

Elvis and Slick Monty is a comic science fiction series about the adventures of two roommates (a half-man/half-fly referee and an ex-musician loosely based on Elvis Presley) as they face off against the world domination plans of an evil mayor. The series won a Lone Star Emmy for "Best Student Production" in 2007.

New Choice

New Choice is an improvisational comedy series, and features members of UNT's Improv Comedy Club.

The Post Cognitive

The Post Cognitive is a throwback to the science fiction of the 1960s. The series won a Lone Star Emmy for "Best Student Production" in 2005. The following year, two episodes were nominated for the same award, of which one of them won.

Very Critical Reviews (VCR)

VCR is an entertainment show featuring various characters reviewing media, more often than not awful movies. Many different genres are covered, and it is currently the only review show on NTTV. It is currently in its fourth season.

North Texas Now

North Texas Now is a magazine series (similar to NT Scene)which focuses on people and events in the North Texas region. Its predecessor NT Scene dates back to 1981.
