= North Texas State Fair and Rodeo =

Annual fair held in Denton, Texas

Coordinates: 33.2331°N 97.13871°W

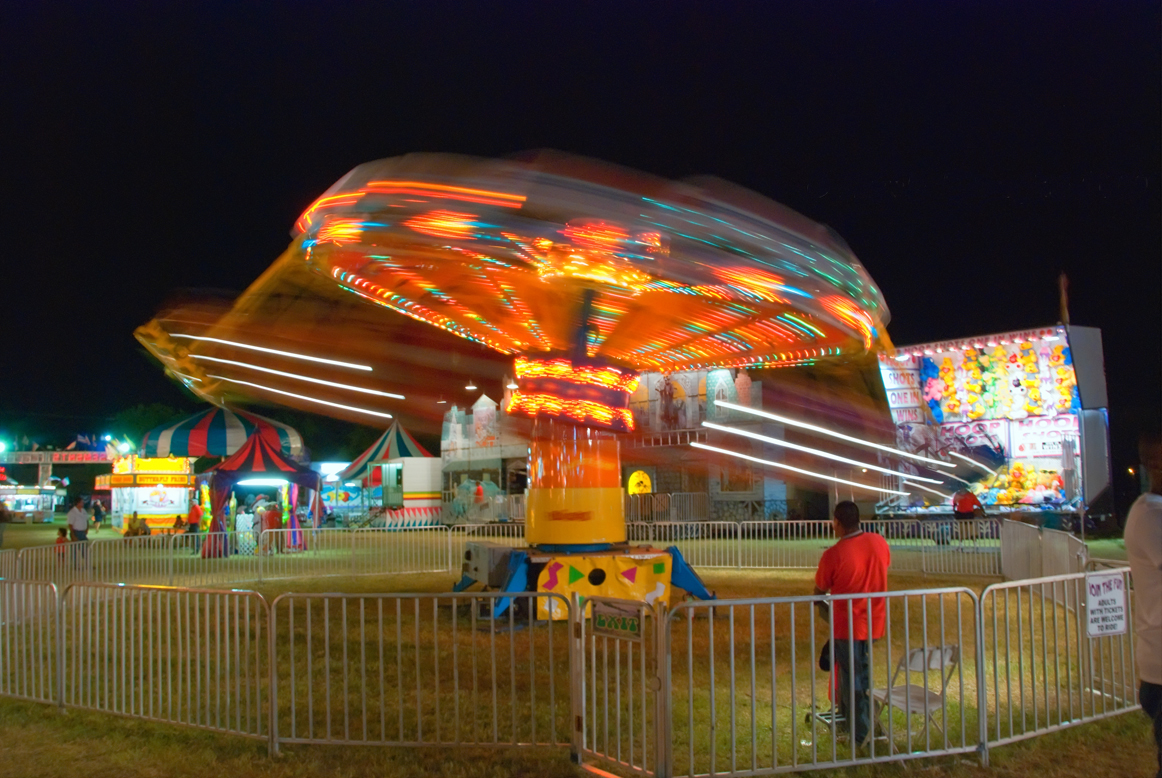
- Genre: State fair
- Frequency: annually
- Locations: Denton, Texas
- Website: Official website

The North Texas State Fair and Rodeo is a fair held in Denton, Texas. It is held every August. It includes a rodeo sanctioned by the Professional Rodeo Cowboys Association (PRCA). Following each rodeo performance, there is a country music concert.
