= Medical City Denton =

Coordinates: 33.177°N 97.091°W

- HCA

Geography
- Location: Denton, Texas, United States

Organization
- Care system: Public
- Type: General
- Affiliated university: None

Services
- Emergency department: Level II trauma center
- Beds: 228

Links
- Website: http://www.medicalcitydenton.com
- Lists: Hospitals in Texas

Medical City Denton, (formerly Denton Regional Medical Center) or Denton Regional, is a hospital operated by Hospital Corporation of America and is located at 3535 South Interstate 35, southeast of downtown Denton, Texas. It houses 228 beds, and employs more than 850 employees and 300 physicians. Denton Regional serves patients from Denton, Wise, Cooke and Montague Counties.

Denton Regional was the first facility in Denton County to earn accreditation as a Level II Chest Pain Center by the Society of Chest Pain Centers (SCPC). Medical City Denton is a Magnet accredited facility and an Advanced Primary Stroke Center.

== Expansion ==
In 2005, a $19 million expansion added a sixth floor to the main building to accommodate a new progressive care unit, neuroscience center, radiation oncology unit, and an endovascular lab.

History: Westgate Hospital and Medical Center at 4405 North Interstate 35 opened on December 30, 1973. It remained opened until 1999, when the new Denton Regional Medical Center opened. The old Westgate campus was demolished (as well as the associated, and older Flow Memorial Hospital on Scripture Street, which was built on a hill near McKenna Park and was replaced with an apartment complex some time after 1994).
