= Denton, Texas =

- City
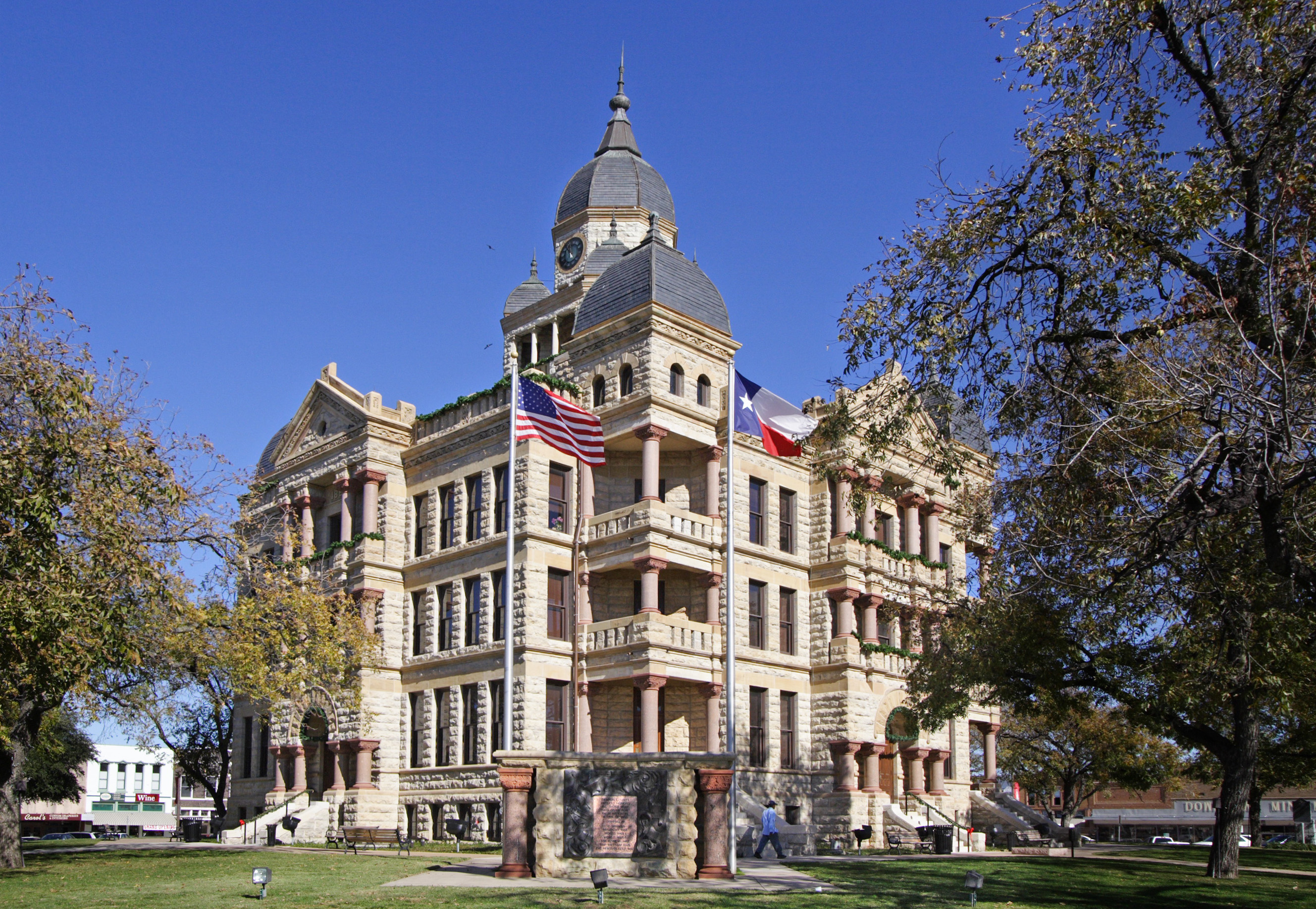
- Denton County Courthouse-on-the-Square

- Seal
- Nicknames: Little Austin, Little D, Redbud Capital of Texas
- Location of Denton in Denton County, Texas

- Location within Texas Location within the United States
- Coordinates: 33°12′59″N 97°7′45″W
- Country: United States
- State: Texas
- County: Denton
- Incorporated: 1866

Government
  - Type: Council–manager
  - City council: Mayor Gerard Hudspeth; Vicki Byrd (Dist 1); Brian Beck (Dist 2); Suzi Rumohr (Dist 3); Joe Holland (Dist 4); Brandon Chase McGee (at-large); Jill Jester (at-large)
  - City manager: Sara Hensley
  - City attorney: Mack Reinwand

Area
  - City: 97.95 sq mi (253.70 km^{2})
  - Land: 96.35 sq mi (249.55 km^{2})
  - Water: 1.60 sq mi (4.14 km^{2}) 1.527%
- Elevation: 659 ft (201 m)

Population (2020)
  - City: 139,869
  - Estimate (2025): 169,431
  - Density: 1,451.7/sq mi (560.49/km^{2})
  - Urban: 429,461 (US: 96th)
  - Urban density: 2,854/sq mi (1,101.9/km^{2})
- Demonym: Dentonian or Dentonite
- Time zone: UTC−6 (CST)
  - Summer (DST): UTC−5 (CDT)
- ZIP Codes: 76201–76210
- Area codes: 940, 682, 817
- FIPS code: 48-19972
- GNIS feature ID: 2410323
- Website: www.cityofdenton.com

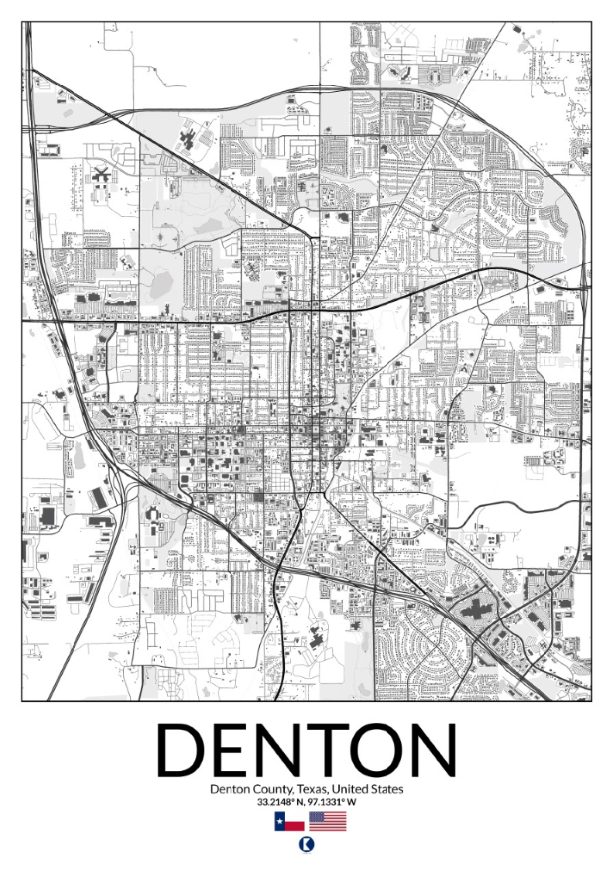
Denton, TX city map; outlines and buildings updated in 2023

Denton is a city in the U.S. state of Texas and the county seat of Denton County. With a population of 139,869 as of 2020, it is the 20th-most populous city in Texas, the 177th-most populous city in the United States, and the 10th-most populous city in the Dallas–Fort Worth metroplex.

A Texas land grant led to the formation of Denton County in 1846, and the city was incorporated in 1866. Both were named after pioneer and Texas militia captain John B. Denton. The arrival of a railroad line in the city in 1881 spurred population, and the establishment of the University of North Texas in 1890 and Texas Woman's University in 1901 distinguished the city from neighboring regions. After the construction of Dallas/Fort Worth International Airport finished in 1974, the city had more rapid growth; between 2022 and 2023, Denton was the 13th largest-gaining city in population nationwide in terms of numeric change.

Located on the far north end of the Dallas–Fort Worth metroplex in North Texas on Interstate 35, Denton is known for its active music scene; the North Texas State Fair and Rodeo, Denton Arts and Jazz Festival, and Thin Line Fest attract over 300,000 people to the city each year. The city has hot, humid summers and few extreme weather events. Its diverse citizenry is represented by a nonpartisan city council, and numerous county and state departments have offices in the city. With over 45,000 students enrolled at the two universities within its city limits, Denton is often characterized as a college town. As a result of the universities' growth, educational services play a large role in the city's economy. Residents are served by the Denton County Transportation Authority, which provides commuter rail and bus service to the area.

== History ==
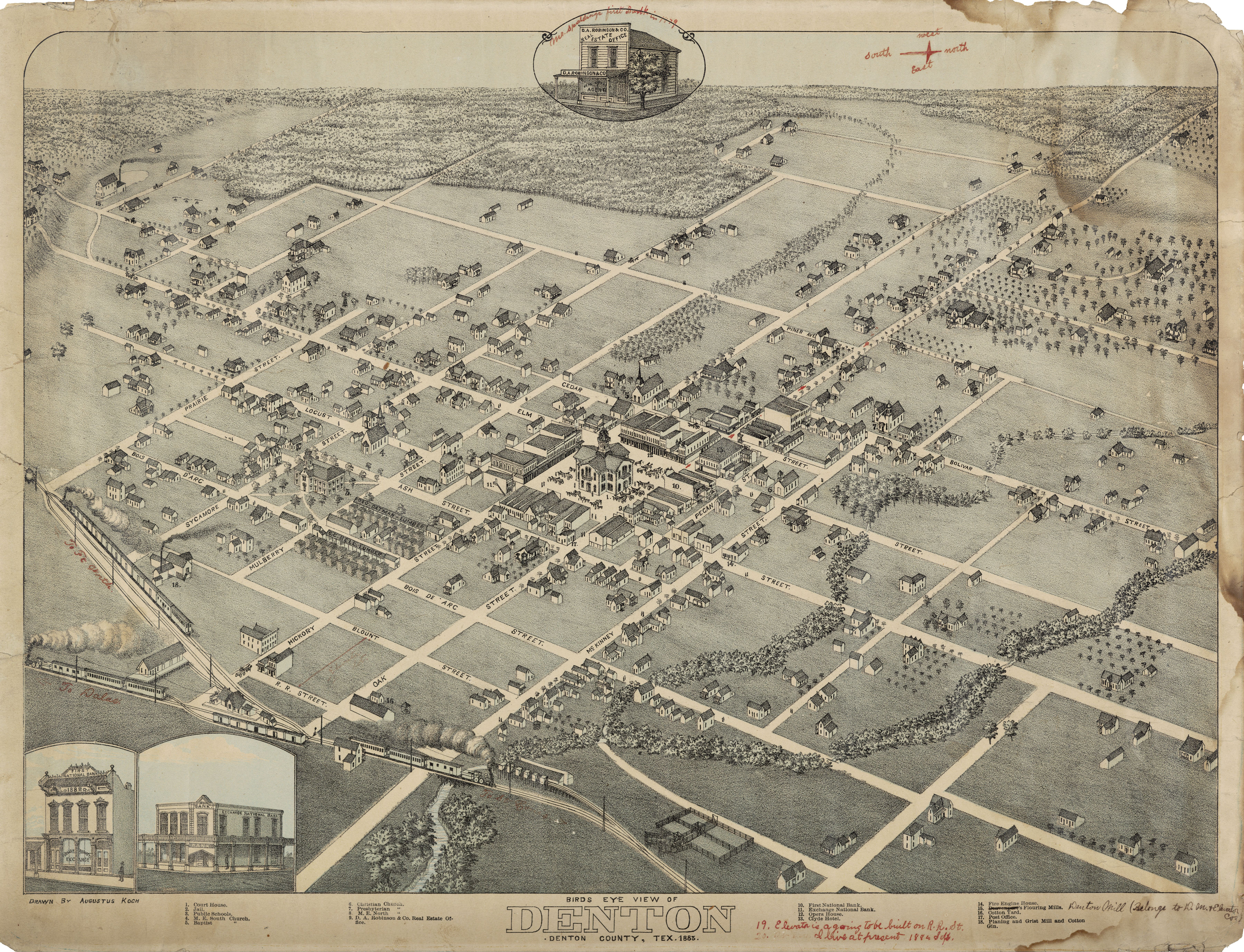
Map of Denton in 1883

Denton's formation is closely tied to that of Denton County. White settlement of the area began in the mid-1800s when William S. Peters of Kentucky obtained a land grant from the Texas Congress and named it Peters Colony. After initial settlement in the southeast part of the county in 1843, the Texas Legislature voted to form Denton County in 1846. Both the county and the town were named for John B. Denton, a preacher and lawyer who was killed in 1841 during a skirmish with the Kichai people in what is now Tarrant County. Pickneyville and Alton were selected as the county seat before Denton was named the seat in 1857. That year, a commission laid out the city and named the first streets.

On July 8, 1860, approximately half of the downtown Square burned down in what was later called the "Texas Troubles". Fires occurred in ten Texas communities that day, including Dallas and Pilot Point, and were quickly attributed to a slave insurrection. By the end of July, vigilante justice took hold and "[r]egularly constituted law-enforcement agencies stepped aside to allow the vigilantes to do their work. Although no hard evidence was ever adduced to prove the guilt of a single alleged black arsonist or white abolitionist, many unfortunates of both classes were nevertheless hanged for their alleged crimes."

In February 1861, a statewide referendum was held and Texans voted to join the Confederate States of America.

=== Segregation and Jim Crow era ===
After the Civil War, "Freedmen Settlements" were started throughout the South. One Freedman Settlement, Quakertown, thrived just south of what is now Texas Woman's University until around 1920, when the city government forcibly removed the residents to make way for a park. Quakertown's Black children were served separately from white children by the Frederick Douglass School. Originally scheduled to open in September 1913, it was mysteriously burned down the night before its scheduled opening. It was rebuilt and in 1949 renamed the "Fred Moore School".

=== Postwar growth ===
Denton's population grew from 26,844 in 1960 to 48,063 in 1980. Its connection to the Dallas–Fort Worth metroplex via I-35E and I-35W played a major role in the growth, and the opening of Dallas/Fort Worth International Airport in 1974 led to a population increase. In the 1980s, heavy manufacturing companies like Victor Equipment Company and Peterbilt joined older manufacturing firms such as Moore Business Forms and Morrison Milling Company in Denton. The population rose from 66,270 in 1990 to 80,537 in 2000. In May 2006, Houston-based real estate company United Equities purchased the 100-block of Fry Street and announced that several of the historic buildings would be demolished and the businesses displaced to accommodate a new mixed-use commercial center. Some residents, who sought to preserve the area as a historic and cultural icon, opposed the proposal. The Denton City Council approved a new proposal for the area from Dinerstein Cos in 2010.

==== Timeline ====
Timeline of Denton, Texas
- 1857
  - Seat of Denton County relocated to Denton from Alton
  - First Methodist Church founded.
  - County Courthouse built.
- 1858 – Union Baptist Church founded
- 1866 – Town of Denton incorporated
- 1868 – Denton Monitor newspaper began publication
- 1869 – J.B. Sawyer became mayor.
- 1870 – Denton (and Texas) readmitted to the Union after the American Civil War, per Reconstruction Acts
- 1880 – Population: 1,194
- 1881 – Railroad began operating
- 1882
  - Denton Chronicle newspaper began publication
  - Fire station built
- 1890 – North Texas Normal College opened
- 1894 – City Hall built
- 1896
  - Streetcar began operating
  - Denton County Courthouse rebuilt.
- 1899 – Denton Record and Chronicle newspaper in publication
- 1900 – Population: 4,187
- 1903 – Girls' Industrial College established
- 1907
  - Trolley began operating
  - Rector Road Bridge built.
- 1914 – City of Denton incorporated
- 1916 – College's Campus Chat newspaper begins publication
- 1920 – City police department and Rotary Club established
- 1921 – Denton County League of Women Voters formed
- 1923 – Public park created in Quakertown
- 1927 – Denton City Hall built
- 1930 – Population: 9,587
- 1933 – Public library opened
- 1939 – KDNT radio began broadcasting
- 1941 – Little Chapel in the Woods built
- 1947 – Denton Municipal Airport began operating
- 1950 – Population: 21,372
- 1954 – Federal Civil Defense Administration regional office relocated to Denton from Dallas.
- 1959 – Council-manager form of government adopted
- 1960 – Denton State School established
- 1961 – North Texas State University active
- 1966
  - Civic Center built
  - Denton joined the North Central Texas Council of Governments (approximate date)
- 1969 – Denton Community Theatre active
- 1974 – Dallas–Fort Worth Regional Airport operating in vicinity of Denton
- 1979 – Courthouse-on-the-Square Museum opened
- 1980
  - Golden Triangle Mall in business
  - Population: 48,063.
- 1987 – North Texas State University Press headquartered in Denton
- 1988 – North Texas State University renamed University of North Texas
- 1996 – City website online (approximate date)
- 2000 – Population: 80,537
- 2003
  - Public swimming pool opened
  - Michael C. Burgess became U.S. representative for Texas's 26th congressional district
- 2010 – Population: 113,383
- 2011 – Downtown Denton Transit Center and University of North Texas' Apogee Stadium opened
- 2014 – Chris Watts became mayor.
- 2015 – Friendship City relationship formalized with Santa Rosa de Múzquiz, Mexico.
- 2020 – Gerard Hudspeth became Denton's first African-American mayor.
- 2024 - 164,096 estimated population

== Geography ==
Denton is on the northern edge of the Dallas–Fort Worth metropolitan area. These three cities form the area known as the "Golden Triangle of North Texas". According to the United States Census Bureau, the city has an area of 89.316 square miles (231.33 km^{2}), of which 87.952 square miles (227.79 km^{2}) is land and 1.364 square miles (3.53 km^{2}) is covered by water. The city lies in the northeast edge of the Bend Arch–Fort Worth Basin, which is characterized by flat terrain. Elevation ranges from 500 to 900 feet (150 to 270 m). Part of the city is atop the Barnett Shale, a geological formation believed to contain large quantities of natural gas. Lewisville Lake, a man-made reservoir, is 15 miles (24 km) south of the city.

=== Climate ===
Denton, Texas

Climate chart (precipitation, max. and min. temperature)
| J | F | M | A | M | J | J | A | S | O | N | D |
| 1.9 53 34 | 2.6 62 38 | 2.8 68 45 | 3.3 74 52 | 5.4 82 61 | 3.3 90 69 | 2.5 94 73 | 2.3 92 72 | 3.4 85 65 | 4.8 77 54 | 2.9 64 43 | 2.7 57 36 |
- █ Average max. and min. temperatures in °F
- █ Precipitation totals in inches
- Source: Weather.com / NWS
Metric conversion
| J | F | M | A | M | J | J | A | S | O | N | D |
| 49 12 1 | 65 17 3 | 72 20 7 | 84 23 11 | 137 28 16 | 84 32 21 | 64 34 23 | 57 33 22 | 85 29 18 | 122 25 12 | 73 18 6 | 68 14 2 |
- █ Average max. and min. temperatures in °C
- █ Precipitation totals in mm

With its hot, humid summers and cool winters, Denton's climate is characterized as humid subtropical and is within USDA hardiness zone 8a. The city's all-time high temperature is 113 °F (45 °C), recorded in 1954. Dry winds affect the area in the summer and can bring temperatures of over 100 °F (38 °C), although the average summer temperature highs range from 91 to 96 °F (33 to 36 °C) between June and August. The all-time recorded low is −6 °F (−21 °C), set on February 16, 2021, and the coolest month is January, with daily low temperatures averaging 33 °F (1 °C). Denton lies on the southern end of what is commonly referred to as "Tornado Alley"; the National Weather Service occasionally issues tornado watches, but tornadoes rarely form in the city. The city receives about 37.7 inches (96 cm) of rain per year. Flash floods and severe thunderstorms are frequent in the spring. Average snowfall is similar to the Dallas–Fort Worth average of 2.4 inches (6.1 cm) per year.

Climate data for Denton, Texas (1991–2020 normals, extremes 1913–present)
| Month | Jan | Feb | Mar | Apr | May | Jun | Jul | Aug | Sep | Oct | Nov | Dec | Year |
|---|---|---|---|---|---|---|---|---|---|---|---|---|---|
| Record high °F (°C) | 90 (32) | 96 (36) | 99 (37) | 102 (39) | 111 (44) | 108 (42) | 113 (45) | 113 (45) | 111 (44) | 103 (39) | 92 (33) | 89 (32) | 113 (45) |
| Mean maximum °F (°C) | 75 (24) | 79 (26) | 86 (30) | 88 (31) | 94 (34) | 98 (37) | 102 (39) | 103 (39) | 98 (37) | 91 (33) | 82 (28) | 76 (24) | 105 (41) |
| Mean daily maximum °F (°C) | 55.8 (13.2) | 59.6 (15.3) | 67.7 (19.8) | 75.6 (24.2) | 82.9 (28.3) | 91.1 (32.8) | 95.9 (35.5) | 95.8 (35.4) | 88.5 (31.4) | 78.1 (25.6) | 66.2 (19.0) | 57.4 (14.1) | 76.2 (24.6) |
| Daily mean °F (°C) | 45.0 (7.2) | 48.5 (9.2) | 56.3 (13.5) | 64.2 (17.9) | 72.8 (22.7) | 81.1 (27.3) | 85.4 (29.7) | 85.0 (29.4) | 77.7 (25.4) | 66.7 (19.3) | 55.2 (12.9) | 46.8 (8.2) | 65.4 (18.6) |
| Mean daily minimum °F (°C) | 34.1 (1.2) | 37.4 (3.0) | 44.8 (7.1) | 52.8 (11.6) | 62.7 (17.1) | 71.1 (21.7) | 74.9 (23.8) | 74.2 (23.4) | 66.8 (19.3) | 55.3 (12.9) | 44.1 (6.7) | 36.1 (2.3) | 54.5 (12.5) |
| Mean minimum °F (°C) | 20 (−7) | 23 (−5) | 29 (−2) | 38 (3) | 48 (9) | 62 (17) | 68 (20) | 66 (19) | 54 (12) | 40 (4) | 29 (−2) | 22 (−6) | 16 (−9) |
| Record low °F (°C) | −3 (−19) | −2 (−19) | 5 (−15) | 25 (−4) | 35 (2) | 47 (8) | 51 (11) | 52 (11) | 36 (2) | 16 (−9) | 10 (−12) | 0 (−18) | −3 (−19) |
| Average precipitation inches (mm) | 2.20 (56) | 2.83 (72) | 3.36 (85) | 3.67 (93) | 4.86 (123) | 3.58 (91) | 2.29 (58) | 2.44 (62) | 2.96 (75) | 4.64 (118) | 2.94 (75) | 2.67 (68) | 38.44 (976) |
| Average precipitation days (≥ 0.01 in) | 7.3 | 7.2 | 7.3 | 6.7 | 9.4 | 6.6 | 4.6 | 5.5 | 5.2 | 6.9 | 6.0 | 6.9 | 79.6 |
Source: NOAA

== Demographics ==
Historical population
| Census | Pop. | Note | %± |
|---|---|---|---|
| 1870 | 361 | | — |
| 1880 | 1,194 | | 230.7% |
| 1890 | 2,558 | | 114.2% |
| 1900 | 4,187 | | 63.7% |
| 1910 | 4,732 | | 13.0% |
| 1920 | 7,626 | | 61.2% |
| 1930 | 9,587 | | 25.7% |
| 1940 | 11,192 | | 16.7% |
| 1950 | 21,372 | | 91.0% |
| 1960 | 26,844 | | 25.6% |
| 1970 | 39,874 | | 48.5% |
| 1980 | 48,063 | | 20.5% |
| 1990 | 66,270 | | 37.9% |
| 2000 | 80,537 | | 21.5% |
| 2010 | 113,383 | | 40.8% |
| 2020 | 139,869 | | 23.4% |
| 2025 (est.) | 169,431 | | 21.1% |

Along with much of the Dallas–Fort Worth metroplex, Denton has grown rapidly since the beginning of the 21st century, becoming the seventh-fastest growing city in the U.S. with a population over 100,000 between 2010 and 2011.

=== Racial and ethnic composition ===
Denton city, Texas – racial and ethnic composition Note: the US Census treats Hispanic/Latino as an ethnic category. This table excludes Latinos from the racial categories and assigns them to a separate category. Hispanics/Latinos may be of any race.
| Race / ethnicity (NH = Non-Hispanic) | Pop. 2000 | Pop. 2010 | Pop. 2020 | % 2000 | % 2010 | % 2020 |
|---|---|---|---|---|---|---|
| White alone (NH) | 55,585 | 70,190 | 76,532 | 69.02% | 61.91% | 54.72% |
| Black or African American alone (NH) | 7,255 | 11,370 | 15,415 | 9.01% | 10.03% | 11.02% |
| Native American or Alaska Native alone (NH) | 380 | 569 | 624 | 0.47% | 0.50% | 0.45% |
| Asian alone (NH) | 2,725 | 4,597 | 6,030 | 3.38% | 4.05% | 4.31% |
| Pacific Islander alone (NH) | 42 | 104 | 152 | 0.05% | 0.09% | 0.11% |
| Some other race alone (NH) | 128 | 155 | 497 | 0.16% | 0.14% | 0.36% |
| Mixed-race or multiracial (NH) | 1,234 | 2,327 | 6,166 | 1.53% | 2.05% | 4.41% |
| Hispanic or Latino (any race) | 13,188 | 24,071 | 34,453 | 16.38% | 21.23% | 24.63% |
| Total | 80,537 | 113,383 | 139,869 | 100.00% | 100.00% | 100.00% |

=== 2020 census ===
As of the 2020 census, Denton had a population of 139,869, 54,092 households, and 28,430 families residing in the city. The median age was 30.2 years. 19.6% of residents were under the age of 18 and 12.6% of residents were 65 years of age or older. For every 100 females there were 94.0 males, and for every 100 females age 18 and over there were 91.7 males age 18 and over.

Racial composition as of the 2020 census
| Race | Number | Percent |
|---|---|---|
| White | 85,580 | 61.2% |
| Black or African American | 15,910 | 11.4% |
| American Indian and Alaska Native | 1,373 | 1.0% |
| Asian | 6,121 | 4.4% |
| Native Hawaiian and Other Pacific Islander | 177 | 0.1% |
| Some other race | 12,413 | 8.9% |
| Two or more races | 18,295 | 13.1% |
| Hispanic or Latino (of any race) | 34,453 | 24.6% |

Of those households, 26.7% had children under the age of 18 living in them. Of all households, 40.6% were married-couple households, 22.4% were households with a male householder and no spouse or partner present, and 29.3% were households with a female householder and no spouse or partner present. About 29.2% of all households were made up of individuals and 7.8% had someone living alone who was 65 years of age or older.

There were 58,085 housing units, of which 6.9% were vacant. The homeowner vacancy rate was 1.6% and the rental vacancy rate was 8.3%.

96.3% of residents lived in urban areas, while 3.7% lived in rural areas.

The median income for a household was $60,018 in 2020. The per capita income was $29,109. About 15.7% of the population were below the poverty line. Denton fares above the national average with 90.4% of the population high school graduated or higher and 38.9% with a bachelor's degree or higher.

Denton's population made it the 197th largest city in the United States and the 20th largest in Texas per the 2020 census.

The United States Census Bureau defines an urban area of northern Dallas-area suburbs that are separated from the Dallas–Fort Worth urban area, with Denton and Lewisville as the principal cities: the Denton–Lewisville, TX urban area had a population of 429,461 as of the 2020 census, ranked 96th in the United States.

== Economy ==
The educational services, health and social services, manufacturing, and general retail sectors employ over 20,000 people in Denton. The city's three largest educational institutions, including the University of North Texas, Denton Independent School District, and Texas Woman's University, are the largest employers, employing almost 12,000 people. The University of North Texas is the city's largest employer, with 7,764 employees comprising 12.59% of the workforce. The City of Denton also employs more than 1,334 people. Wholesale trade and hospitality jobs also play major roles. Notable businesses headquartered in Denton include truck manufacturer Peterbilt, beauty supplier Sally Beauty Company, and jewelry producer Jostens. Golden Triangle Mall, the city's largest shopping complex with over 90 specialty shops, is a major source of retail trade.

In fall of 2024, STULZ Air Technology Systems, an HVAC and cooling solutions manufacturer, announced a new manufacturing plant opening in late 2025. The 200,000 square-foot facility will create approximately 200 new jobs.

=== Top employers ===
According to Denton's Economic Development Partnership Report, the top employers in Denton were:

| # | Employer | Number of employees |
|---|---|---|
| 1 | University of North Texas | 5,100 |
| 2 | Denton Independent School District | 4,417 |
| 3 | Peterbilt Motors | 2,000 |
| 4 | Texas Woman's University | 868-1,875 |
| 5 | Denton County (in Denton) | 1,803 |
| 6 | City of Denton | 1,757 |
| 7 | Denton State Supported Living Center | 1,700 |
| 8 | Texas Health Presbyterian Hospital Denton | 1,100 |
| 9 | Sally Beauty Holding, Inc | 1,000 |
| 10 | Medical City Denton | 799 |

== Arts and cultural life ==
Denton is home to several annual artistic and cultural events that cater to residents and tourists. The annual North Texas State Fair and Rodeo began in 1928 and promotes Texas's cowboy culture. In addition to a rodeo, the event features several local country rock performances, pageants, and food contests. Hosted by the North Texas State Fairgrounds since 1948, the fair brings in over 150,000 people during its nine-day run. The annual Denton Black Film Festival has film screenings & art exhibitions, along with music, poetry and comedy performances.

The Denton Municipal Airport has hosted the annual Denton Airshow since 1998. The event includes aerial demonstrations and airplane exhibits; it attracted over 10,000 attendees in 2012. Other events in the city include an annual Redbud Festival, the Fiesta on the Square, the Thin Line Fest, and the Day of the Dead Festival. Denton houses the largest community garden in the nation, Shiloh Field Community Garden, which covers 14.5 acres.

=== Music ===
Denton's independent music scene has emerged alongside its academic music establishments, including the University of North Texas College of Music. The city's live music venues are largely supported by Denton's college-town atmosphere, although show attendance is bolstered by area residents. Since 1976 the Denton Community Band and Jazz Ensemble has provided performance opportunities at local concerts and holiday festivals for the many talented amateur musicians incubated in Denton's rich environment of music education. The Dallas Observer features a column on Denton's music scene. In 2007 and 2008, Denton's music scene received feature attention from The Guardian, Pop Matters, and The New York Times. Paste Magazine named Denton's music scene the best in the nation in 2008. In 2014, the Huffington Post listed Denton as Texas's top emerging cultural hot spot, calling Denton "practically an indie band factory at this point".

The city-sponsored Denton Arts and Jazz Festival attracts over 200,000 people each year for live music, food, crafts, and recreation at Civic Center Park. With hopes to create a live music event like South by Southwest, Denton held the first North by 35 Music Festival, later renamed 35 Denton, in March 2009. The festival ceased in 2017 after running annually for several years. The city has also hosted the annual film and music festival Thin Line Fest annually since 2007. It is Texas's longest-running documentary film festival and attracts thousands of tourists over a few days each year.

=== Denton Square ===
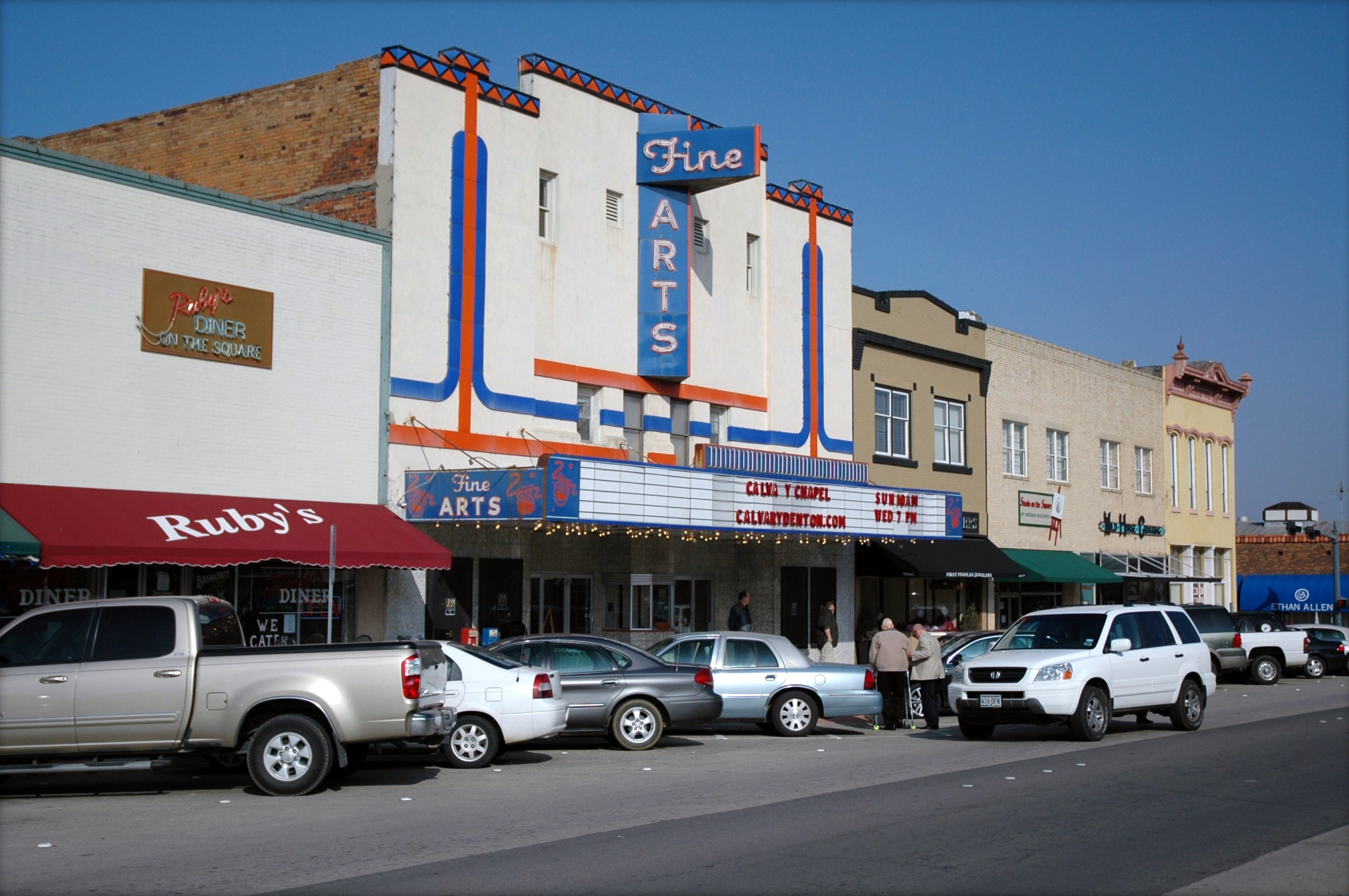
Denton Historic Town Square

The Denton Square, bordered by Oak, Hickory, Locust, and Elm Streets, is a cultural and political hub of the city. At its center is the Denton County Courthouse-on-the-Square, which includes local government offices and a museum showcasing area history and culture.

Listed on the U.S. National Register of Historic Places, the former county courthouse was restored for the Texas Sesquicentennial in 1986. The positive response to the renovation sparked a downtown revitalization program that generated new jobs and reinvestment capital. The downtown square is populated by local shops and restaurants, some of which have been in business since the 1940s. Each year, the downtown square is adorned with lights and spotlighted during the Denton Holiday Lighting Festival.

During October, the square is generally decorated for Halloween, with large installations such as a set of tentacles that are placed on one of the buildings. The town’s focus on Halloween has garnered widespread attention, leading the Texas Legislature to name Denton as the official “Halloween Capital of Texas”.

In 1918, the Daughters of the Confederacy erected the Denton Confederate Soldier Monument, a 12-foot tall (3.7 m) granite, arched monument topped with a statue of a Confederate soldier, in the Denton Square on the courthouse lawn. The monument was controversial, and Denton County Commissioners unanimously approved its removal on June 9, 2020.

=== Sports ===
Denton is home to Denton Diablos FC, a USL League Two soccer team. The team plays at University of North Texas' Mean Green Soccer Stadium. Denton is also home to the North Texas Mean Green, an NCAA Division I team, and the Texas Women's Pioneer, an NCAA Division II team.

== Government ==
=== Local government ===
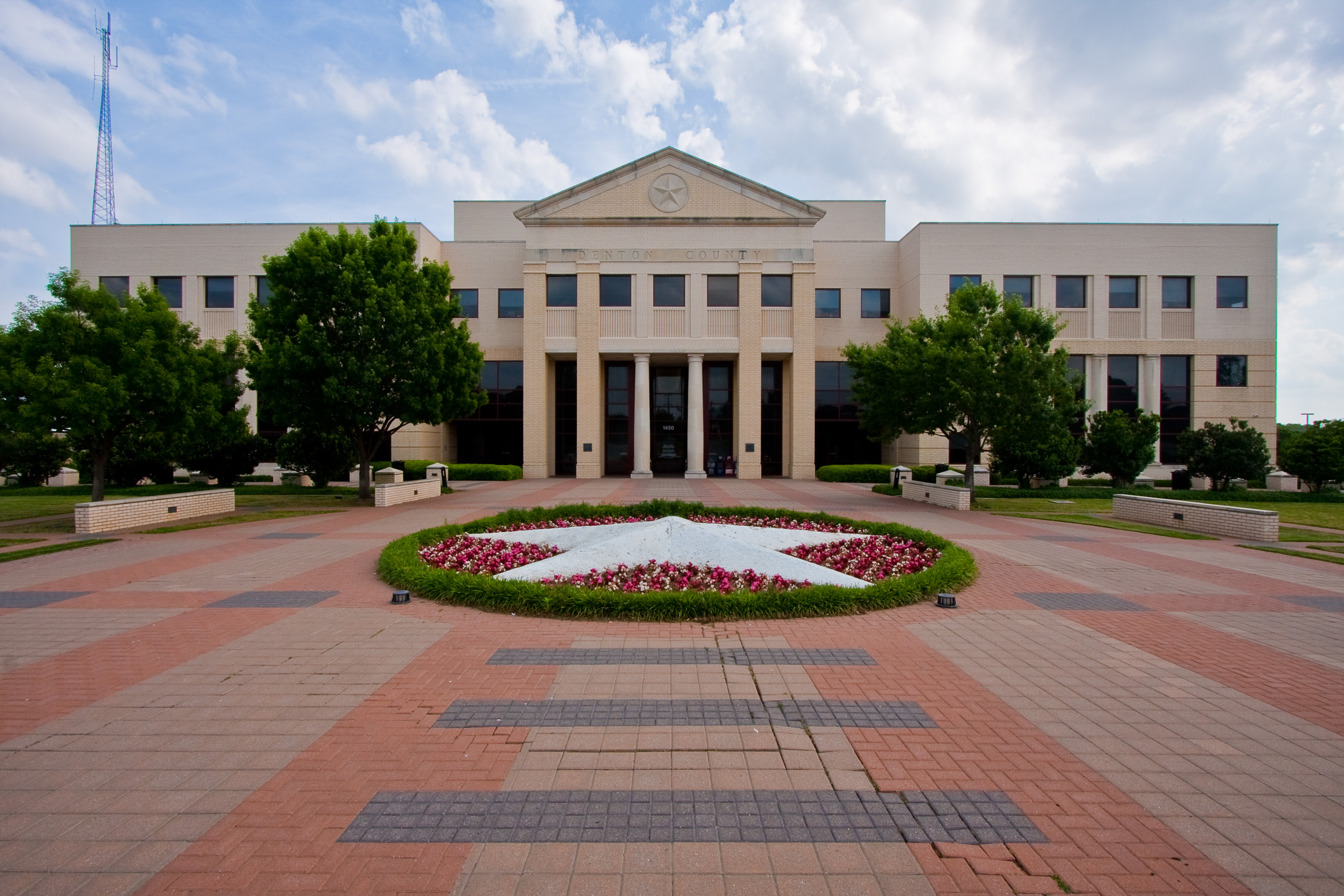
Denton County Courts Building

Denton is the county seat of Denton County. From 1914 to 1959, the City of Denton used a mayor–city commission system, but a charter adopted in 1959 created a council–manager form of city government. Residents elect a mayor, four single-member district council members, and two at-large members. The Denton City Council appoints the city manager. Council terms are for two years, with a maximum of three consecutive terms, and elections are held each year in May. Denton Municipal Utilities administers utilities; the city provides water, wastewater, electric, drainage and solid waste service. The electric utility, Denton Municipal Electric (DME), has been in operation since 1905. In 2009, DME began providing 40% of its energy to customers through renewable resources. The City of Denton Water Utilities Department serves the city's water demand. Atmos Energy provides the city's natural gas. Denton is a part of the Sister Cities International program and maintains cultural and economic exchange programs with its sister cities, Madaba, Jordan, and San Nicolás de los Garza, Mexico.

Denton is a voluntary member of the North Central Texas Council of Governments association, the purpose of which is to coordinate individual and collective local governments and facilitate regional solutions, eliminate unnecessary duplication, and enable joint decisions.

=== Politics ===
Denton historically is a solidly Republican-voting city, but it has become more competitive in national elections as its population has diversified, shifting toward the Democratic Party in more recent elections.

Denton city vote by party in presidential elections
| Year | Democratic | Republican | Third parties/Ind. |
|---|---|---|---|
| 2024 | 50.44% 36,884 | 47.83% 34,979 | 1.72% 1,260 |
| 2020 | 48.01% 38,910 | 49.97% 40,499 | 2.02% 1,637 |
| 2016 | 40.52% 24,943 | 52.80% 32,501 | 6.68% 4,112 |

Denton city vote by party in gubernatorial elections
| Year | Democratic | Republican | Third parties/Ind. |
|---|---|---|---|
| 2022 | 53.22% 27,787 | 45.13% 23,520 | 1.53% 800 |
| 2018 | 47.85% 29,623 | 49.86% 30,865 | 2.27% 1,410 |

=== Federal and state government ===
After the 2021 redistricting process, new and significantly different political boundaries were set for Denton County. Starting in 2023, most of Denton is in the 13th Congressional district. The southwest portions of the city are in the 26th Congressional district.

Almost all of the city is in newly drawn Texas House district 64. Some portions of south, north, and far east Denton are in Texas House districts 57 and 106. All of the city is in the new Texas Senate district 30, except for some western portions in district 12.

Several Texas state agencies have facilities in the city, including a Texas Workforce Center, a Texas Department of Public Safety office, a Texas Department of Criminal Justice office, and a Denton District Parole Office.

The Denton State Supported Living Center, formerly Denton State School, is Texas's largest residential facility for people with developmental disabilities. It serves an 18-county area and employs approximately 1,500 people.

The Federal Emergency Management Agency (FEMA) has its Region VI headquarters in Denton.

=== County and municipal government ===
All Denton city council and mayoral terms are two years, unlike in most cities in the area, which use three-year terms. Even-numbered years bring the elections of the three at-large seats, places 5 & 6 and mayor. Odd-numbered years bring the elections of the four district council members.

List of mayors of Denton, Texas
- J. B. Sawyer, 1869
- W. J. Austin, 1870
- Dempsey Jackson, 1871
- W. C. Bobbett, 1872
- R. B. Coleman, 1873
- David Jones Eddleman, 1874–1875
- Joseph Warren Jagoe, 1876
- M. W. Deavenport Sr., 1877, 1891
- John Allen Withers, 1878
- Thomas E. Hogg, 1879
- I. D. Ferguson, 1880
- D. N. Dodson, 1881
- C. L. Herbert Jr., 1882
- D. A. Robinson, 1883
- T. W. Abney 1883–1885
- Oliver Perry Poe, 1885–1888, 1891–1894, 1896–1904, 1910–1911
- Emory C. Smith, 1888–1890
- J. A. Carroll, 1890–1891
- F. M. Davidson, 1894–1895
- W. L. McCormick, 1904–1905
- T. J. Simmons, 1906–1907
- Ed. F. Bates, 1908–1909, 1912–1913
- W. L. Foreman, 1914–1915
- R. H. Evers, 1915
- S. G. Gary, 1916
- Peter Joseph Beyette, 1917–1919
- H. V. Hennen, 1919–1925
- B. W. McKenzie, 1926–1933
- J. L. Wright, 1934–1937
- Lee Preston, 1938–1945
- J. L. Yarborough, 1946–1949, 1956–1957
- Mark Hannah, 1950–1955
- Jack Bryson, 1957–1959
- Frank L. Barrow, 1959–1962
- W. F. Brooks Sr., 1962
- Warren Whitson Jr., 1962–1967
- Zeke Martin, 1967–1969
- L. A. Nelson, 1969–1970
- A. M. Finlay Jr., 1970–1972
- William Nash "Bill" Neu, 1972–1974
- Tom D. Jester Jr., 1974–1976
- Elinor Hughes, 1976–1978
- Joe Mitchell, 1978–1979
- William Stanley "Bill" Nash, 1979–1980
- Richard O. Stewart, 1980–1986
- Ray Stephens, 1986-1989
- Bob Castleberry, 1990–1995
- Jack Miller, 1996–1999
- Euline Brock, 2000–2005
- Perry McNeill, 2006–2008
- Mark Burroughs, 2008–2014
- Chris Watts, 2014–2020
- Gerard Hudspeth, 2020–present

The mayor is Gerard Hudspeth, who was elected in 2020 and reelected in 2022.

In 2014, city voters approved a ban on fracking.

In 2022, city voters approved decriminalization of possession of misdemeanor amounts of marijuana.

== Education ==
=== Primary and secondary schools ===
Denton Independent School District (DISD) provides the public primary and secondary educational system in the majority of the city. The district comprises four comprehensive high schools (Braswell, Denton, Guyer, and Ryan), two alternative high schools, and multiple elementary and middle schools. Small portions of the city extend into the Argyle, Krum, Ponder, and Sanger school districts. The respective comprehensive high schools of these districts are: Argyle, Krum, Ponder, and Sanger.

Denton is also host to several private schools with religious affiliations and alternative education models. According to the 2010 United States Census, 35.1% of all adults over the age of 25 in Denton have obtained a bachelor's degree, as compared to the state average of 25.8%, and 86.1% of residents over the age of 25 have earned a high school diploma, as compared to the state average of 80%.

The high school residential program Texas Academy of Mathematics and Science, for gifted students, is in Denton.

The Roman Catholic Immaculate Conception Catholic School, a K–8 school of the Roman Catholic Diocese of Fort Worth, opened in 1995. Construction on the current facility started on July 15, 2001, with its opening on August 19, 2002.

The charter school operator Life's Beautiful Educational Centers Inc. (closed 1999) operated the school L.O.V.E. in Denton.

=== Public libraries ===
Denton is served by the Denton Public Library, which has three branches: Emily Fowler Central Library, North Branch Library, and South Branch Library.

=== University of North Texas ===
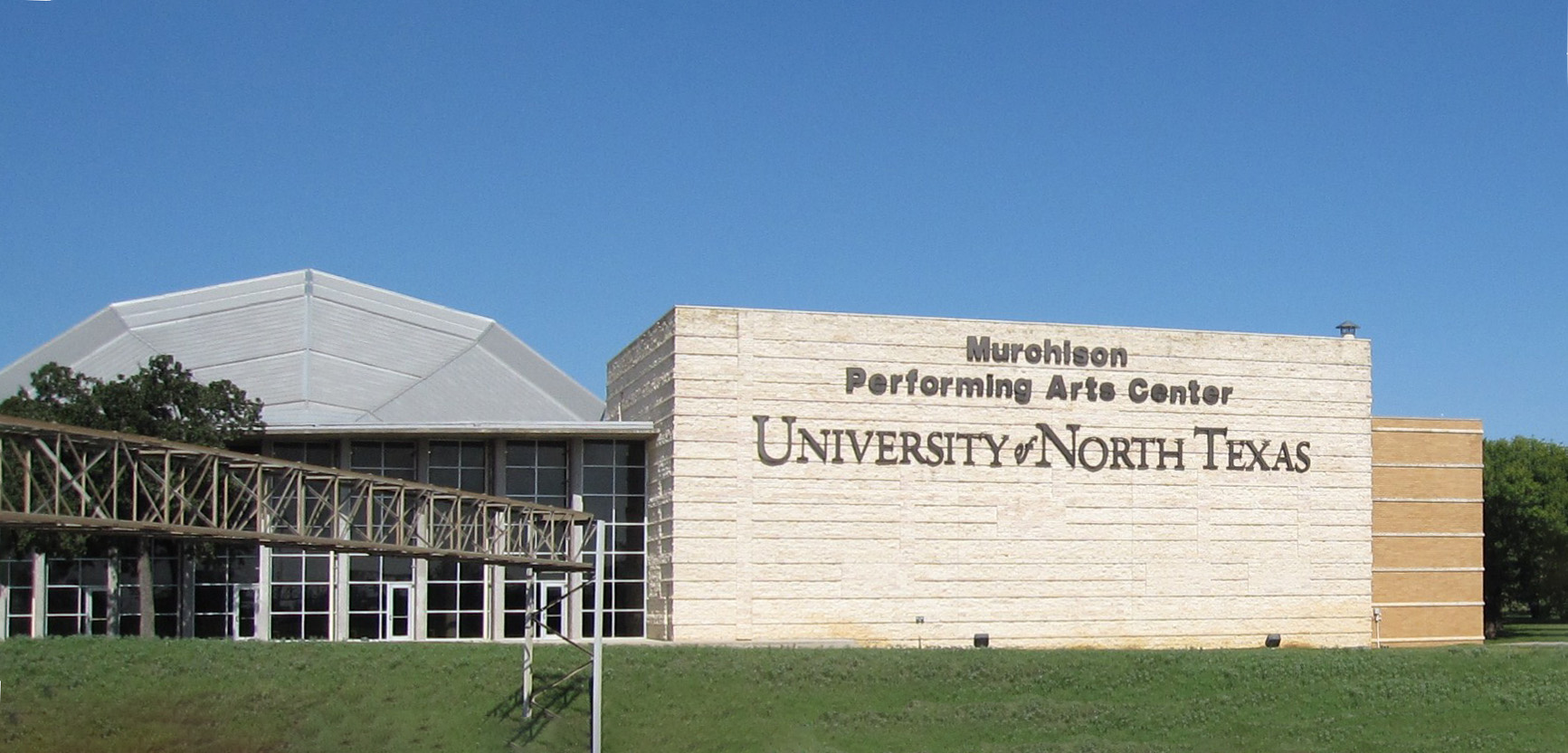
The University of North Texas is the second largest university in North Texas.

The University of North Texas (UNT) in Denton is the flagship university of the University of North Texas System, which also includes the UNT Health Science Center in Fort Worth, the University of North Texas at Dallas, UNT Dallas College of Law, and a satellite campus in Frisco. With an enrollment of over 42,000, it's the fifth largest university in Texas. The university is accredited by the Southern Association of Colleges and Schools (SACS). Its College of Music, the first school to offer a degree in the field of jazz studies, is internationally recognized and known for producing successful artists.

=== Texas Woman's University ===
Texas Woman's University (TWU) is a public university system in Denton with two health science center campuses in Dallas and Houston. Founded in 1901, the university enrolls more than 13,000 undergraduates and graduates. Men have been admitted to TWU since 1972 but make up less than ten percent of the university. TWU's College of Nursing is the second largest in Texas and in the top 20 of largest nursing programs in the United States, and the school's nursing doctoral program is the largest in the world.

=== FSB Exchange at NCTC Denton ===
North Central Texas College (NCTC) is a public community college based in Gainesville, Texas. Starting in the 2019–2020 school year, North Central Texas College partnered with First State Bank to open a branch campus in downtown Denton. Located in the former Denton Record-Chronicle building, the campus focuses on accounting, business, biology, early childhood education, kinesiology, psychology, and general studies.

== Media ==
Since 1899, the Denton Record-Chronicle has been the newspaper of record for Denton. When it was acquired by Belo Corporation in 1999, the newspaper had a circulation of 16,000. The North Texas Daily and The Lasso provide daily and weekly news to students at the University of North Texas and Texas Woman's University. The city's public television station, Denton TV (DTV), covers city council meetings, restaurant scores, high school football, and educational programming. UNT's television station, ntTV, is broadcast on local channels provided by Charter Communications and Verizon Communications. ntTV News is broadcast live Monday through Thursday. KNTU 88.1 FM is UNT's official radio station. First aired in 1969, the station primarily plays a mixture of jazz and blues and covers local sports and news.

== Infrastructure ==
=== Health care ===
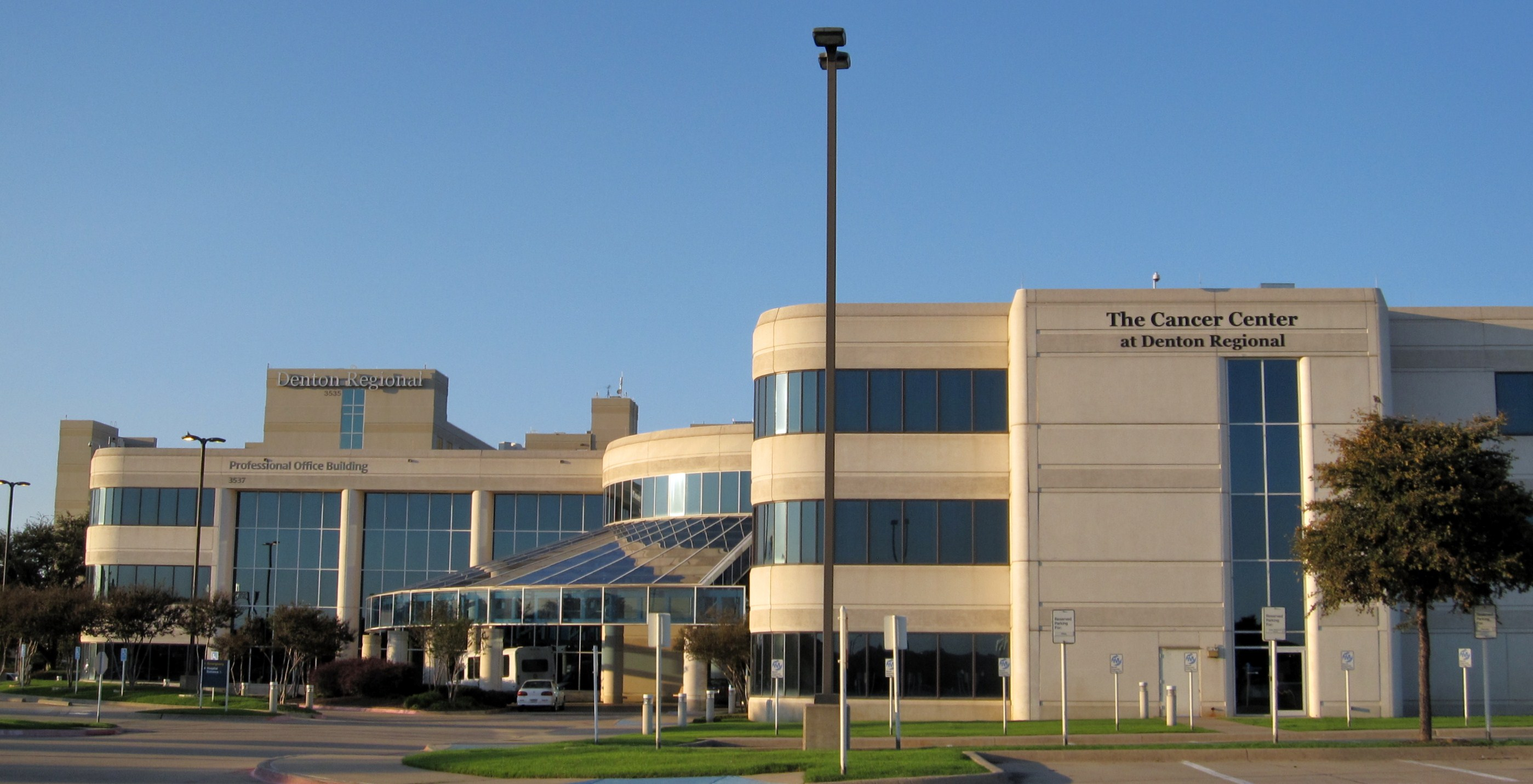
Medical City Denton, one of the major hospitals in Denton

Two major hospitals operate in Denton: Medical City Denton and Texas Health Presbyterian Hospital Denton are both full-service hospitals with differing capacities: 208 beds and 255 beds, respectively. Each employs more than 800 employees and are licensed with emergency services.

=== Fracking ban ===
In response to the previously mentioned, 2014 city referendum prohibiting hydraulic fracturing (fracking) that passed with 59% of the vote, Texas enacted a law specifying "the exclusive jurisdiction of this state to regulate oil and gas operations in this state and the express preemption of local regulation of those operations", though it allows some "commercially reasonable" rules. Denton's city council put out a statement affirming it will "continue to enforce our current regulations to protect the health and safety of our residents, but we do not know how the operators or courts will react".

== Transportation ==
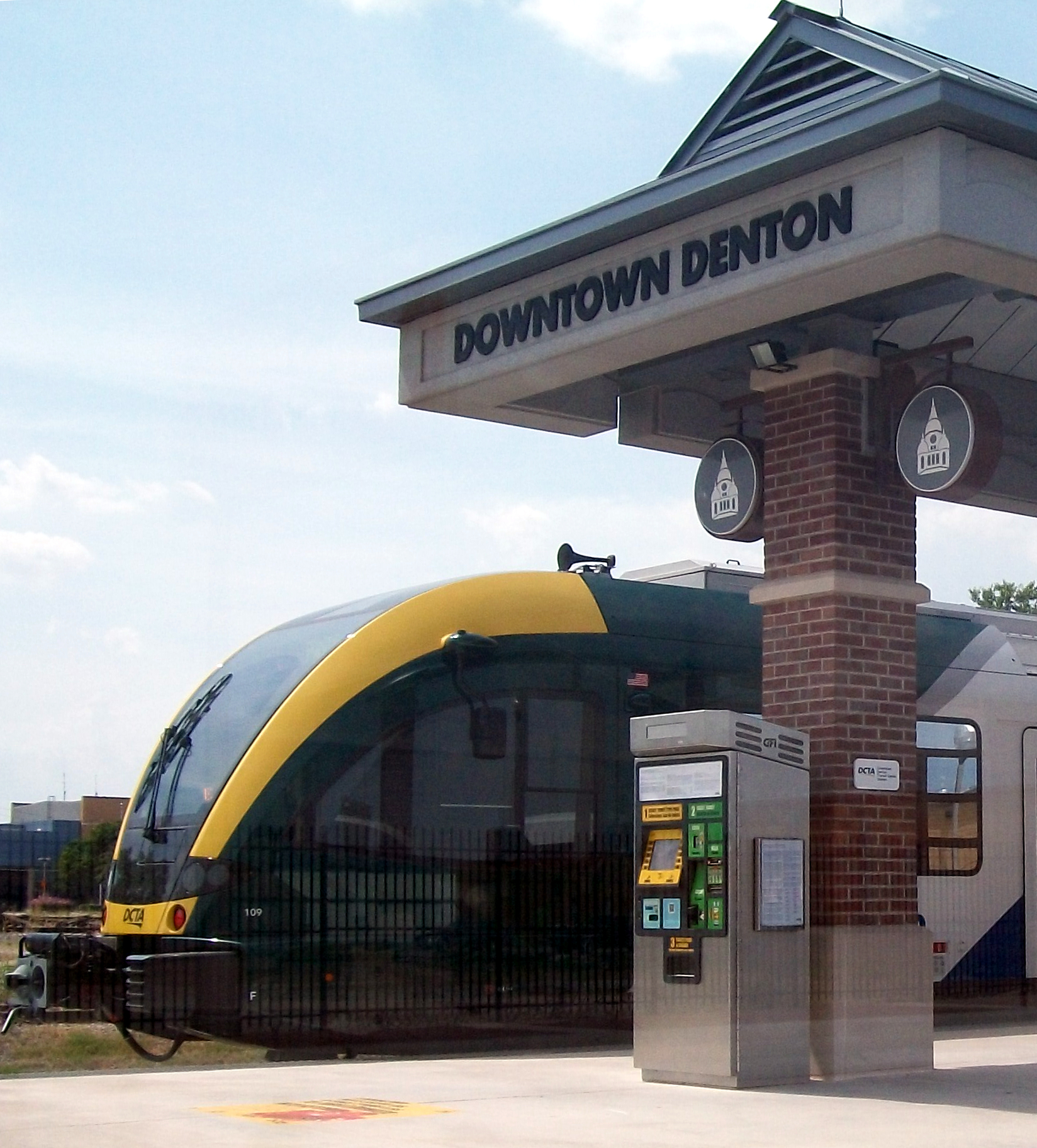
DCTA A-train station at Downtown Denton Transit Center

I-35E and I-35W, which split in Hillsboro south of the Metroplex and come north through Dallas and Fort Worth respectively, rejoin near the University of North Texas campus in the southwest part of Denton to form Interstate 35 as it continues north on its way to Oklahoma. Loop 288 partially encircles the city; it passes through the northern limits of the city by C. H. Collins Athletic Complex and the eastern side near Golden Triangle Mall. Highway 77 and 377 go through the historic town square and Highway 380 connects Denton to Frisco and McKinney in the east and Decatur in the west. Denton Enterprise Airport is a public airport located 3 miles (4.8 km) west of the central business district (CBD) of Denton. This airport serves as home to various cargo and charter operators as well as two flight schools. A new terminal opened in 2008, but as of June 2008 no scheduled commuter service is in place.

=== Mass transit ===
Denton is served by the Denton County Transportation Authority (DCTA), which operates the local bus service, an on-demand GoZone service, and regional rail to Lewisville and Carrollton, with connections to Dallas' DART rail system. In 2011, Downtown Denton Transit Center and Medpark Station opened as commuter rail stations on DCTA's A-train, which now has five stations and connects to the Green Line of Dallas Area Rapid Transit's (DART) Green Line at Trinity Mills Station. The two transit companies, along with the Trinity Rail Express (TRE) of Fort Worth, offer regional passes to be used on any of the three systems. As of August, 2017 (no deadline announced), rides between the first two (DDTC and Medpark) and the last two (Hebron and Trinity Mills) are "fare-free", though any ride to or through the 3rd stop (Lewisville Lake) will require a paid pass. DCTA states this will relocate downtown parking needs to the underutilized space at Medpark station, and enhance mobility in Downtown Denton, including for students, as well as for residents of Hebron who connect to the DART system one stop away at Trinity Mills.

DCTA also operates the Connect local bus service within Denton, special university shuttles, and on-demand GoZone services in partnership with TransitTech provider Via Transportation. All Connect services (not the A-train) are free of charge for students at the University of North Texas who swipe their ID at the bus entrance. Special Programs for Aging Needs (SPAN), a non-profit organization, offers paratransit service for senior citizens and people with disabilities of all ages.

== Notable people ==
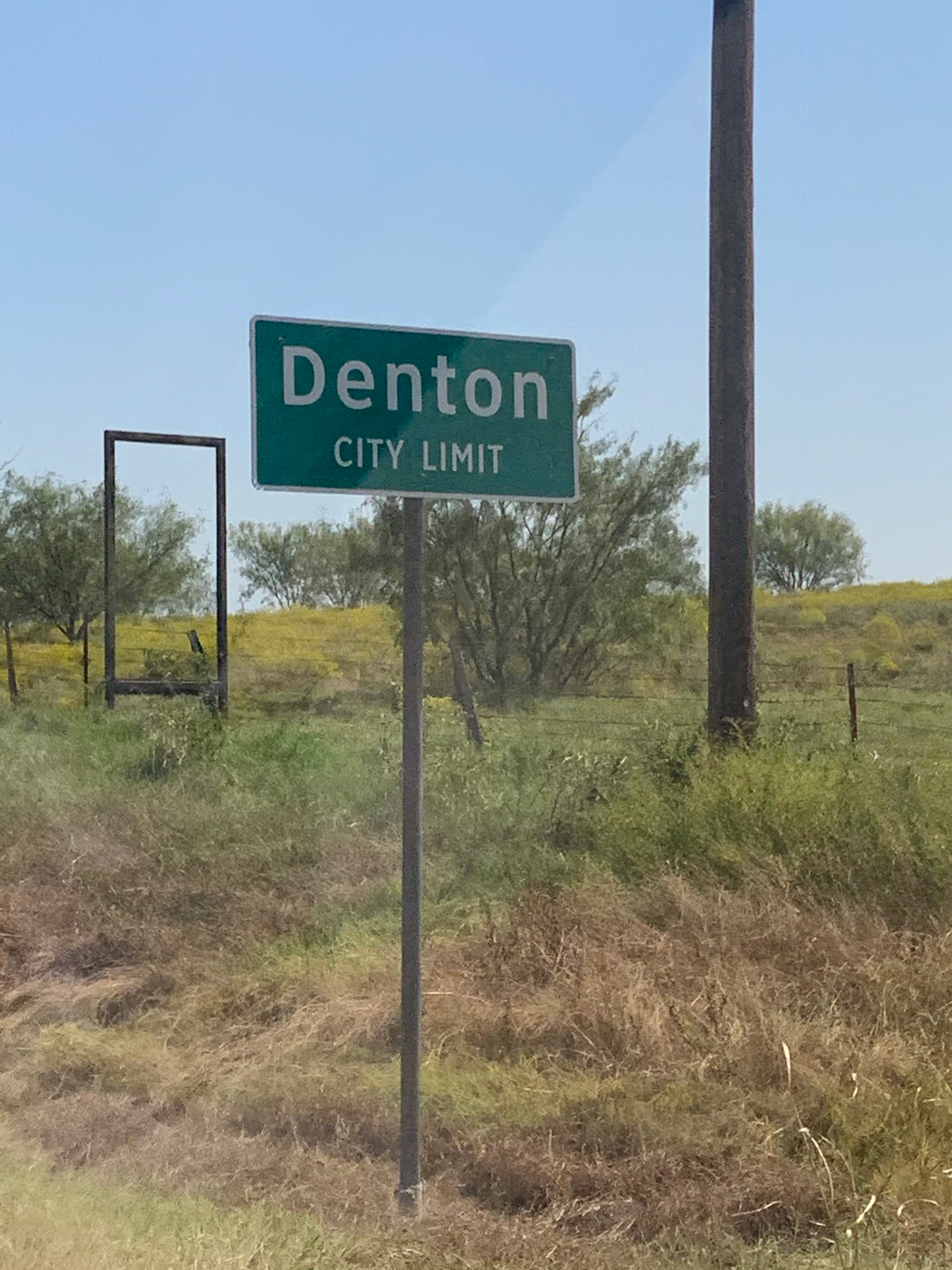
Denton, Texas, city limit sign

=== Politicians and activists ===
- Amber Briggle, activist and business owner
- Bob Castleberry, former mayor and sweepstakes winner (born in Denton)

=== Artists, entertainers, and celebrities ===
- Aaron Aryanpur, stand-up comedian (grew up in Denton)
- Shirley Cothran, 1975 Miss America (born in Denton County, Texas and Denton High graduate)
- Herschel Evans, jazz musician (born in Denton)
- Phyllis George, 1971 Miss America, First Lady of Kentucky (1979–1983); businesswoman, actress, and sportscaster
- Sarah Jaffe, singer-songwriter
- Ralph Kirshbaum, classical cellist (born in Denton, raised in Tyler, Texas)
- Jason Lee, actor, skateboarder
- Livingston, singer-songwriter (born and raised in Denton)
- Meat Loaf, born Michael Lee Aday, singer and actor
- Memphis May Fire, metal band
- Xander Mobus, voice actor
- Ray Peterson, 1950s/1960s pop singer (born in Denton)
- Leila Rahimi, television sports anchor WMAQ-TV, reporter WSCR-AM (born and raised in Denton)
- Andrew Savage, painter, Grammy-nominated musician, co-frontman of Parquet Courts (born in Denton)
- Robert Ray "Rocky" Shahan, actor, stuntman (born and died in Denton)
- Ann Sheridan, actress (born in Denton)
- Josh T. Pearson, musician
- Sly Stone, Sly & The Family Stone founder (born in Denton)
- Tommy Taylor, musician (born in Denton)
- Mike Wiebe, musician (The Riverboat Gamblers), actor and stand-up comedian
- Von Erich Family, American Wrestlers

=== Athletes ===
- Mario Bennett, former NBA player 1995–2000 (born in Denton)
- Jim Chamblee, former MLB player (born in Denton)
- Brandon Erwin, racing driver (born in Denton)
- Carl Garrett, NFL player (born in Denton)
- Abner Haynes, former NFL player (born in Denton)
- Austin Jackson, MLB player (born in Denton)
- Corey Knebel, MLB player (born in Denton)
- Jarvis Moss, NFL player (born in Denton)
- Jalen Wilson, NBA player (born in Denton)

=== Other ===
- Tom Lovell, builder of the Denton County Courthouse-on-the-Square
- Stanley G. Payne, historian
- Gerard Roland Vela, microbiologist

== Bibliography ==
- "Denton". Texas State Gazetteer and Business Directory. St. Louis: R.L. Polk & Co. 1884.
- Bates, Ed F. (1918). History and Reminiscences of Denton County. Denton: Denton, Tex., McNitzky printing company. LCCN 19004337. OCLC 2133818.
- Mary Jo Cowling. Geography of Denton County. Dallas: Banks Upshaw and Co., 1936.
- Federal Writers' Project (1940), "Denton", Texas: a Guide to the Lone Star State, American Guide Series, New York: Hastings House, pp. 426–427, hdl:2027/mdp.39015002677667 – via HathiTrust
- E. Dale Odom and Bullitt Lowry. A Brief History of Denton County, Texas. Denton: Denton County Historical Commission, 1975.
- C. A. Bridges. History of Denton, Texas, from Its Beginning to 1960 (Waco: Texian Press, 1978)
- 1986 Calendar of Early Denton History. Friends of the Denton Public Library. 1985 – via University of North Texas Libraries.
- 1988 Historical Calendar: Mayors of Denton. Friends of the Denton Public Library. 1987. Archived from the original on April 15, 2017 – via University of North Texas Libraries.
- Denton Review, Historical Society of Denton County, OCLC 21421878 1989-
- Hollace Hervey (2002). Historic Denton County: An Illustrated History. San Antonio: Historical Publishing Network. ISBN 978-1-893619-07-4.
- Paul T. Hellmann (2006). "Texas: Denton". Historical Gazetteer of the United States. Taylor & Francis. ISBN 978-1-135-94859-7.
