= Denton Confederate Soldier Monument =

Confederate memorial in Denton, Texas, U.S.

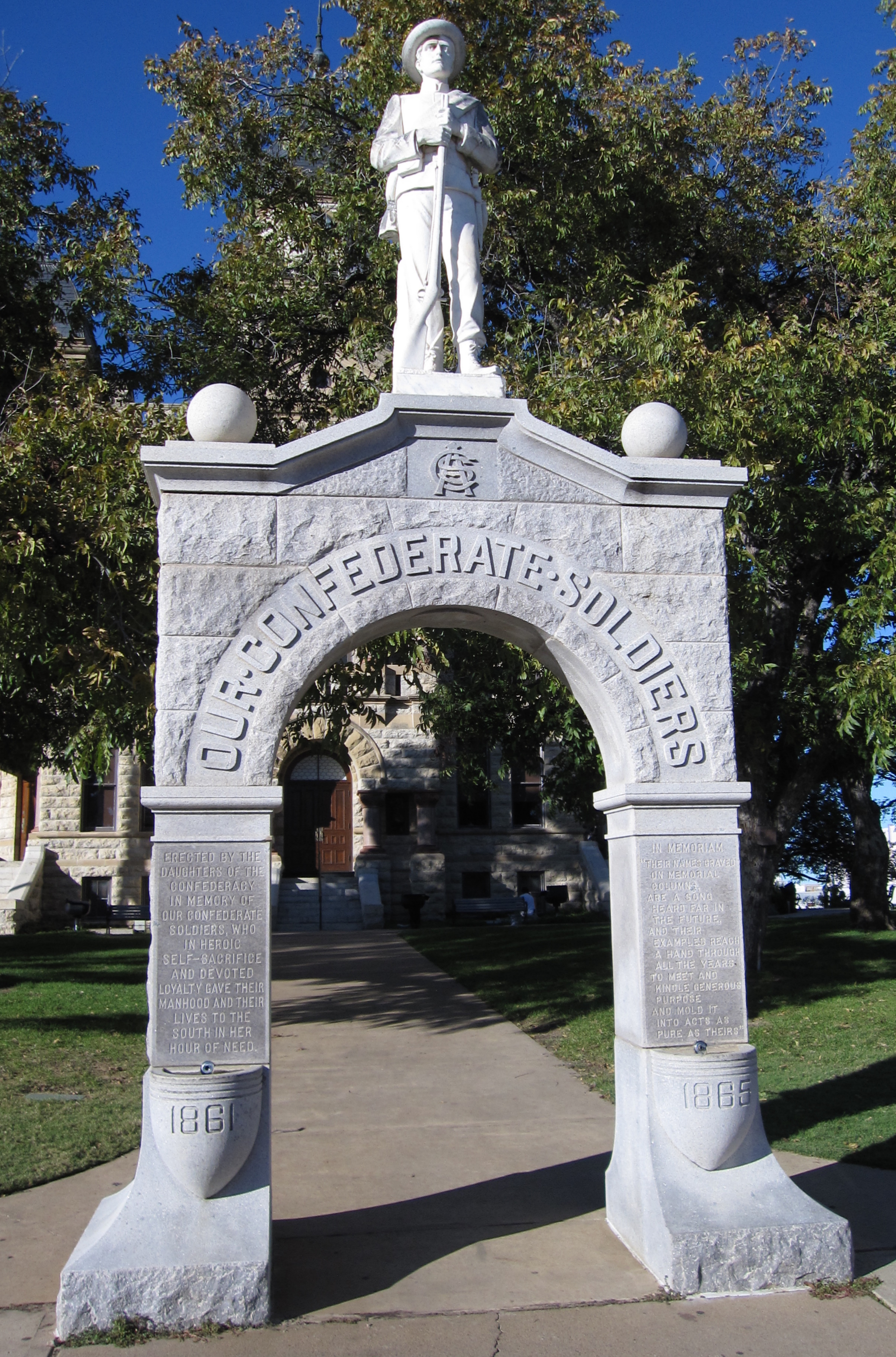
- The monument c. 2000
- Completion date: 1918
- Location: Denton, Texas, United States
- 33.2146°N 97.1331°W

The Denton Confederate Soldier Monument was an outdoor Confederate memorial installed in downtown Denton, Texas, in the United States.

== Description ==
The statue depicts an armed Confederate soldier standing on an arch with the inscription, "Our Confederate soldiers". On the left pillar it read:

Erected by the Daughters of the Confederacy in memory of our Confederate soldiers, who in heroic self-sacrifice and devoted loyalty gave their lives to the South in her hour of need.

On the right pillar it read:

"Their names graved on memorial columns are a song heard far in the future, and their examples reach a hand through all the years to meet and kindle generous purpose and mold it into acts as pure as theirs."

== History ==
The monument was funded and erected in 1918 by the Katie Daffan Chapter of the United Daughters of the Confederacy, and unveiled on June 3, the anniversary of Jefferson Davis's birthday. At the unveiling ceremony, Texas State Senator James Robert Wiley told onlookers:

Historians do not do them [Confederate soldiers] and their work justice. They have been forced to submit to teachings and doctrines unfavorable to themselves. I hope in the future a history will be written that will tell of their deeds as carefully and truthfully as it should be told. The Confederate soldiers were not traitors—the men who went out from the South were God-fearing, patriotic men who believed their cause was just.

The monument was named a Texas Historic Landmark in 1970, a National Historic Registry landmark in 1977, and a Texas State Archeological Landmark in 1981.

=== Vandalism and removal ===
One local resident, Willie Hudspeth, a Vietnam War veteran and the president of Denton's NAACP, campaigned to remove the memorial since 2000. The monument was vandalized with the words "This Is Racist" in 2015. On February 1, 2018, Denton County leaders voted 12–3 to keep the statue, but to add a plaque denouncing slavery and a video kiosk explaining the city's racial history and progress, which was never added or completed. A standalone plaque was erected nearby to provide a rationale for the monument. It read:

The Denton County soldier memorial was erected in 1918 by the Daughters of the Confederacy. The monument stands as a reminder of historic events and is intended as a memorial to Denton County citizens who sacrificed themselves for the community.

Now let this be a testimony that God created all men equal with certain inalienable rights.

We are all one, citizens of Denton County.

On June 9, 2020, in the wake of the protests following the murder of George Floyd in Minneapolis, Denton County commissioners voted to remove the memorial. On the morning of June 25, 2020, removal of the statue began just before dawn.

== See also ==
- 1918 in art
- Confederate Monument (Fort Worth, Texas)
- List of Confederate monuments and memorials
- List of monuments and memorials removed during the George Floyd protests
