= 2020 Denton mayoral election =

- November 3, 2020
- Turnout: 15,913
Candidate	Gerard Hudspeth	Keely Briggs
Party	Nonpartisan	Nonpartisan
Percentage	53.2%	46.8%
- Hudspeth: 40–50% 50–60% 60–70% 70–80% 80–90% >90% Briggs: 40–50% 50–60% 60–70% 70–80% 80–90% Tie: 40–50% 50% No votes
Mayor before election
Chris Watts
Elected mayor
Gerard Hudspeth

The 2020 Denton mayoral election were held on November 8, 2020 to elect the mayor of Denton, Texas, United States. All city of Denton municipal elections are nonpartisan.

The election was originally scheduled for early May, but was pushed back to the 2020 November general election due to the COVID-19 pandemic.

Keely Briggs, Gerard Hudspeth, and Michael Mitchell all appeared on the November 3 ballot. Briggs received the most votes with 49%, Hudspeth second-most with 42%, and Mitchell last with 10% of the votes. Since no candidate received more than 50% of the total vote, Briggs and Hudspeth advanced to a December runoff election.

In the December runoff election, Hudspeth defeated Briggs with 53.2% of the vote.

== Declared ==
- Keely Briggs
- Gerard Hudspeth
- Michael Mitchell

== Advanced to Runoff ==
- Keely Briggs
- Gerard Hudspeth
