= Denton Enterprise Airport =

Airport in Denton County, Texas

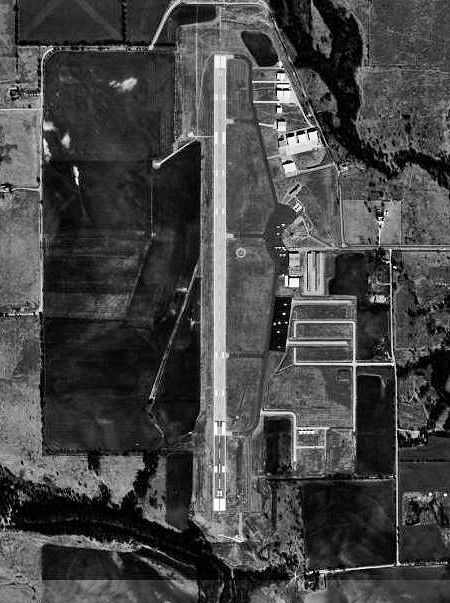
- USGS aerial image, January 1996
- IATA: none; ICAO: KDTO; FAA LID: DTO

Summary
- Airport type: Public
- Owner: City of Denton
- Serves: Denton, Texas
- Elevation AMSL: 643 ft (196 m)
- Coordinates: 33°12′03″N 97°11′53″W

Map
- Location of airport in Texas / United States DTO (the United States)

Runways
Direction	Length		Surface
Direction	ft	m	Surface
18L/36R	7,002	2,134	Asphalt
18R/36L	5,003	1,525	Asphalt

Statistics (2023)
- Aircraft operations (year ending 9/30/2023): 196,034
- Based aircraft: 420
- Source: Federal Aviation Administration

Denton Enterprise Airport (ICAO: KDTO, FAA LID: DTO), also known as Denton Airport and previously Denton Municipal Airport, is a city-owned, public-use airport located three nautical miles (6 km) west of the central business district of Denton, a city in Denton County, Texas, United States.

This airport is assigned a three-letter location identifier of DTO by the Federal Aviation Administration, but it does not have an International Air Transport Association (IATA) airport code.

== History ==
The airport was established in 1942 and used during 1943–44 by the United States Army Air Forces as a contract glider training airfield. It was known at the time as Denton Field. Harte Flying Service provided instruction. It was used primarily by C-47 Skytrains and Waco CG-4 unpowered Gliders. The mission of the school was to train glider pilot students in proficiency in operation of gliders in various types of towed and soaring flight, both day and night, and in servicing of gliders in the field.

It was inactivated in late 1944 with the drawdown of AAFTC's pilot training program. It was then declared surplus and turned over to the Army Corps of Engineers on September 30, 1945. It was eventually discharged to the War Assets Administration (WAA) and became a civil airport in December 1946.

== Facilities and aircraft ==
Denton Municipal Airport covers an area of 929 acres (376 ha) at an elevation of 643 feet (196 m) above mean sea level. It has two asphalt paved runways designated 18L,18R/36L,36R which measures 7,002 x 150 feet (2,134 x 46 m) and 5,003 x 75 feet (1,525 x 23 m).

For the 12-month period ending September 30, 2023, the airport had 196,034 aircraft operations, an average of 537 per day. At that time there were 420 aircraft based at the airport: 309 single-engine, 62 multi-engine, 34 jet, and 15 helicopter.

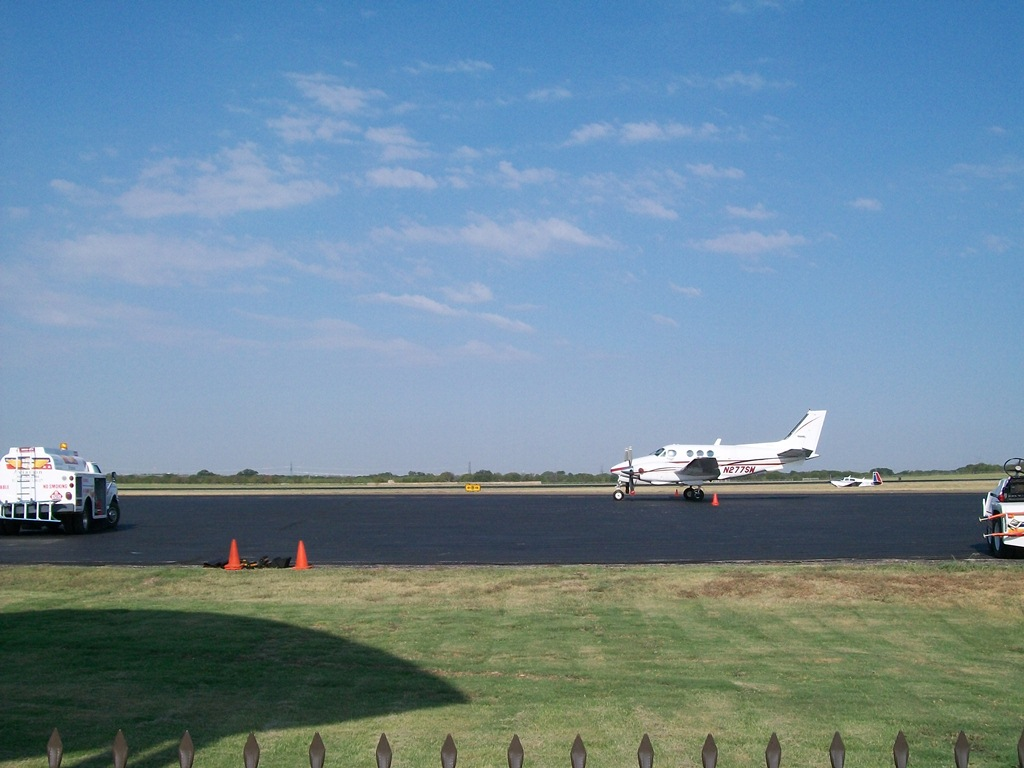
A private plane landing at the airport

The airport has 2 flight schools:

- In The Pattern
- US Aviation Academy

The airport also has 1 fixed-base operator (FBO):

- Sheltair Aviation Services

Additionally, the Hangar 10 Flying Museum is located here.

== Civil Air Patrol ==
The airport has been home to the Nighthawk Composite Squadron (SWR-TX-413) of the Texas Wing Civil Air Patrol for over 20 years.

== See also ==
- Texas World War II Army Airfields
- List of airports in Texas
