= Downtown Denton Transit Center =

Intermodal transit center in Denton, Texas

Downtown Denton
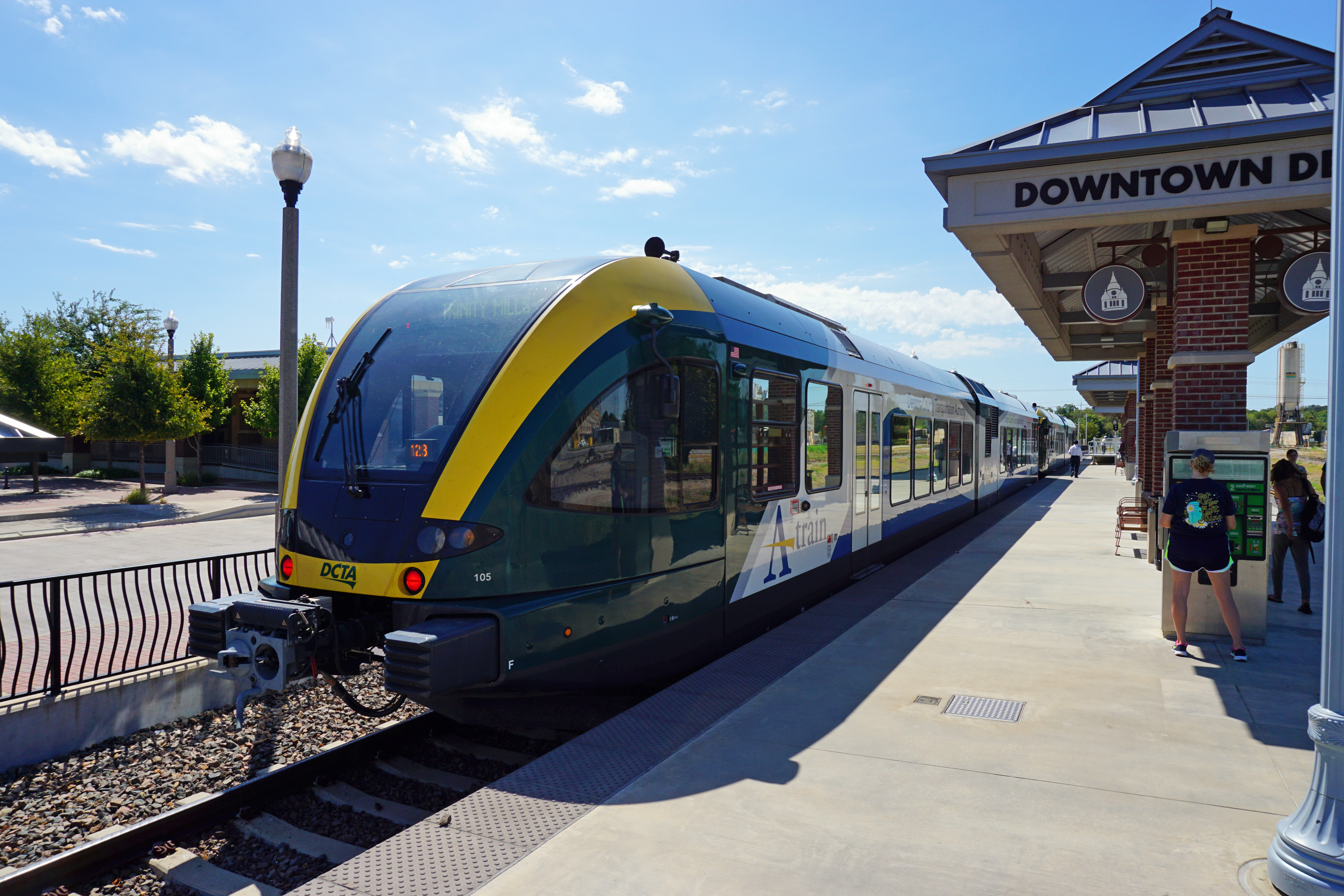
- A-Train at the Downtown Denton Transit Center platform in 2015

General information
- Other names: Euline Brock Downtown Denton Transit Center
- Location: 604 East Hickory Street; Denton, Texas
- Coordinates: 33°12′50″N 97°07′35″W
- Owner: Denton County Transportation Authority
- Platforms: 1 island platform
- Tracks: 2
- Connections: DCTA: 3, 6, 7 (M-Sat), North Texas Express (M-F), GoZone Denton (M-Sun)

Construction
- Structure type: At-grade
- Parking: 73 spaces
- Accessible: Yes

History
- Opened: June 18, 2011

Services
Preceding station	DCTA	Following station
Terminus	A-train	MedPark toward Trinity Mills
Location

The Downtown Denton Transit Center, officially the Euline Brock Downtown Denton Transit Center, is an intermodal public transit station in Denton, Texas. The station, operated by the Denton County Transportation Authority (DCTA), serves as the northern terminus of the A-train, a transfer center for the DCTA Connect bus system, and a hub for the GoZone Denton microtransit system. The station also hosts DCTA's customer service center.

The station is about a 1/2 mile (0.80 km) east of downtown Denton, 3/4 mile (1.2 km) south of Texas Woman's University, and 1 1/4 miles (2.0 km) east of the University of North Texas.

Unlike other A-train stations, Downtown Denton does not primarily serve as a park-and-ride lot. However, the A-train operates a fare-free travel zone between Downtown Denton and MedPark, which allows riders to utilize MedPark's lot.

On DCTA maps and signage, the station is denoted by a grey circle containing the Denton County Courthouse-on-the-Square.

== History ==
In 2005, the City of Denton received a federal grant for a downtown transit facility, totaling $3.1 million. Initial plans for the project were presented in 2008. A groundbreaking was held on March 22, 2010.

On June 18, 2011, the A-train's opening ceremony, dubbed the "Rock n' Rail Station Celebration", took place. A ribbon-cutting was held at Downtown Denton Transit Center, which was followed by free rides on the train and live music at all DCTA-built stations. Revenue service began the following Monday.

On August 7, 2013, the station was formally renamed in honor of Euline Brock. Brock was a member of Denton City Council from 1992 to 1998, the mayor of Denton from 2000 to 2006, and an advocate for investment in both Downtown Denton and public transit. A placard commemorating Brock was installed the following year.
