= Sally Beauty Holdings =

American beauty supplies retailer

Sally Beauty Holdings, Inc.
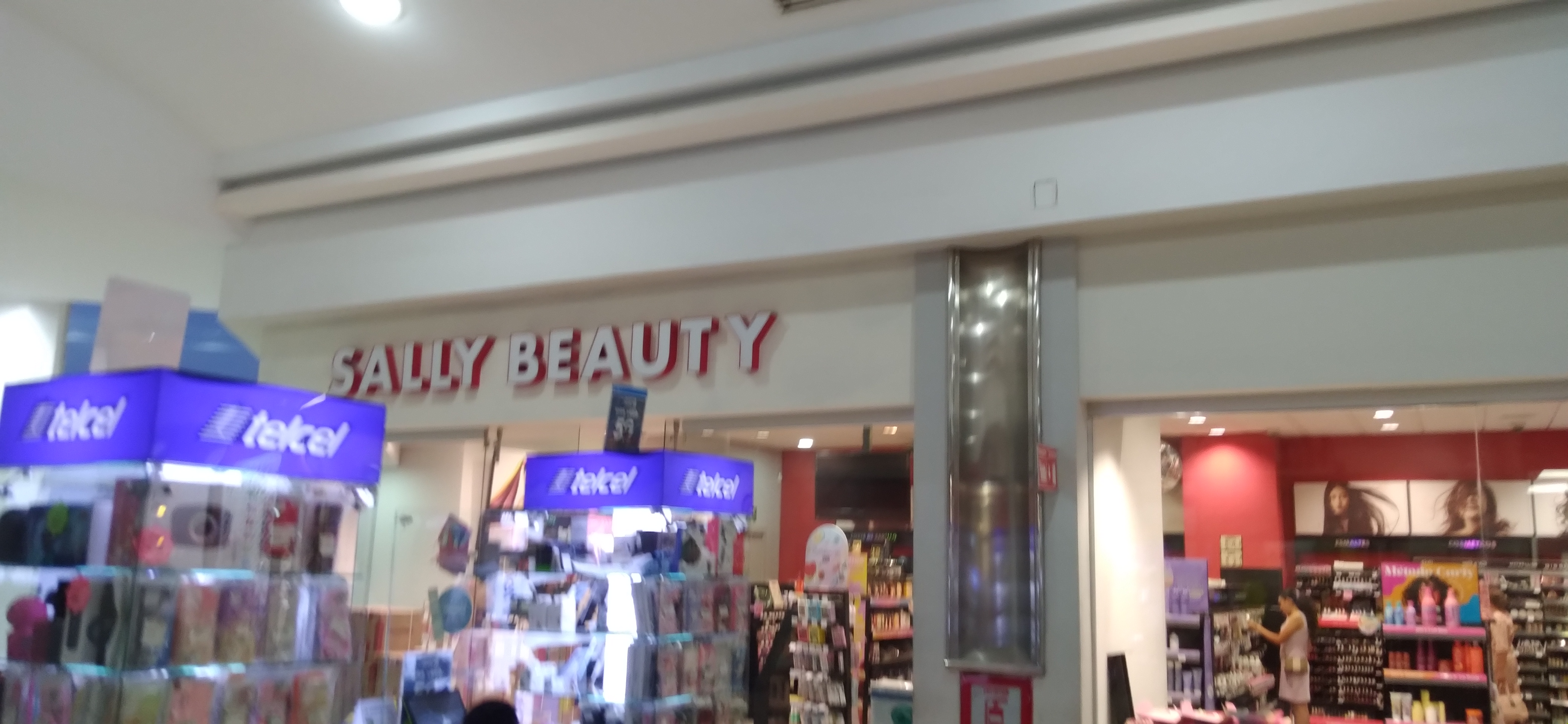
- Type: Public
- Traded as: NYSE: SBH; S&P 600 component
- Industry: Beauty, retail
- Founded: 1964; 62 years ago (spin-off from Alberto-Culver)
- Headquarters: Plano, Texas, U.S.
- Number of locations: 4,386 (Q3 2026)
- Area served: United States (since 1964); Puerto Rico (since 1993)
- Key people: Denise Paulonis (CEO)
- Products: Beauty products
- Revenue: ▼US$961.4 million (2021)
- Number of employees: 30,050 (2019)
- Website: www.sallybeauty.com

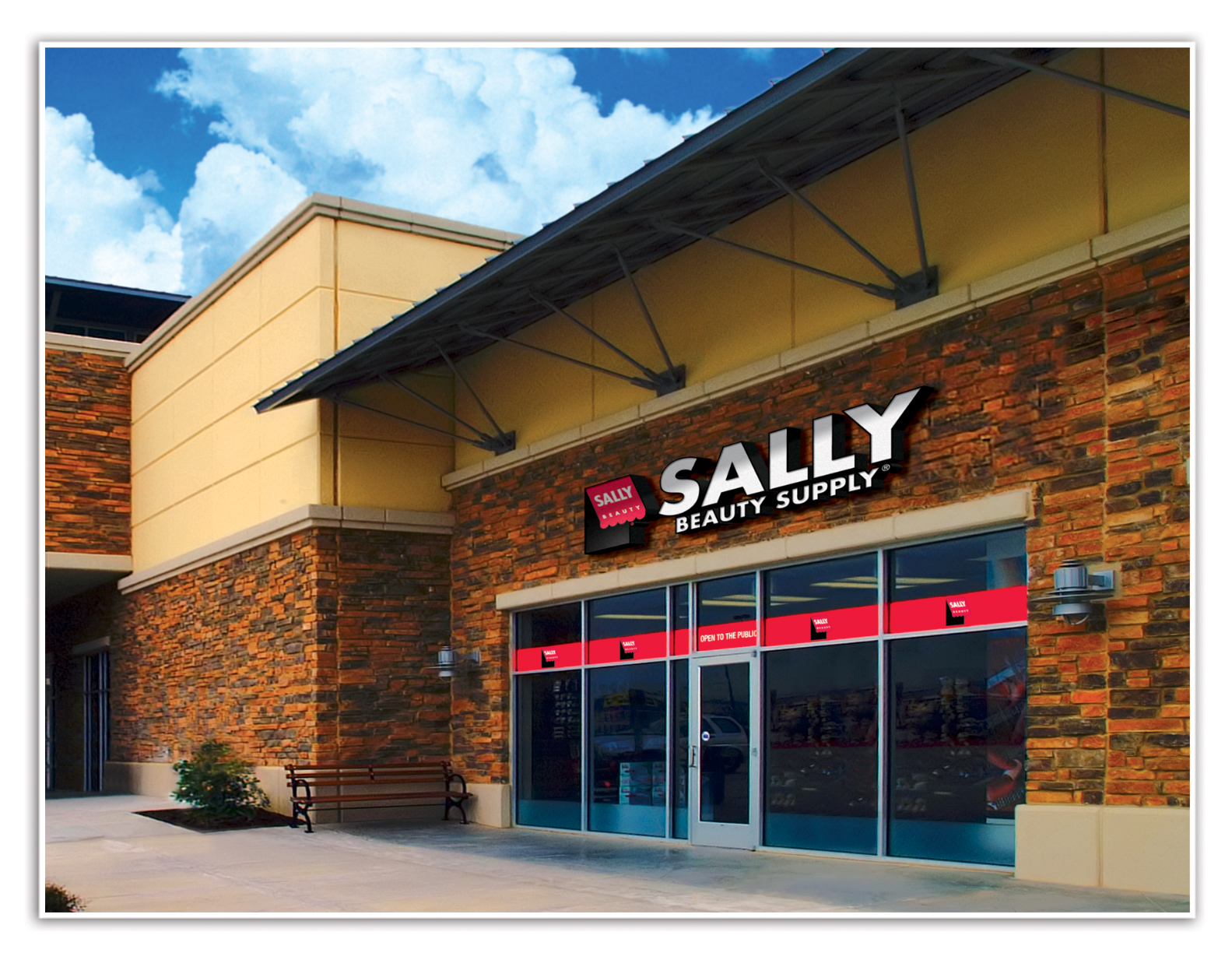
A Sally Beauty Supply store in Texas

Sally Beauty Holdings, Inc. is an American international specialty retailer and distributor of professional beauty supplies with revenues of more than $3.9 billion annually.

Through the Sally Beauty Supply and Beauty Systems Group businesses, the Company sells and distributes through over 4,000 stores, including approximately 200 franchised units, throughout the United States, the United Kingdom (Sally Beauty UK), Belgium (pro- duo 40SHOPS M&A ), Canada, Chile, Peru, Puerto Rico, Mexico (2000 Amstrong McCall 130 shops M&A), France, Ireland, Germany and The Netherlands.

Sally Beauty Supply stores offer more than 6,000 products for hair, skin, and nails through professional lines such as Clairol, L'Oreal, Wella, and Conair, as well as an extensive selection of proprietary merchandise.

Beauty Systems Group stores, branded as CosmoProf or Armstrong McCall stores, along with its outside sales consultants, sell up to 9,800 professionally branded products including Paul Mitchell, Wella, Sebastian, Goldwell, and TIGI which are targeted exclusively for professional and salon use and resale to their customers. They have also moved to expanding their brand basics, they now sell more products for African-American women. These products include Mixed Chicks, Shea Moisture, and Curlys. The company made this move to seem more inclusive.

== History ==
Sally Beauty Holdings, Inc. opened its first store in New Orleans in 1964. Sally Beauty Company was started by C. Ray Farber in New Orleans and operated its flagship store on Magazine Street before the company was sold to Alberto-Culver. The store was named after his daughter Sally.

== Corporate governance ==
Gary Winterhalter became the company's CEO in 2013. Winterhalter left the CEO role at the end of the first quarter, 2015 and took the role of executive chairman, which he held through the beginning of 2018. Coincident with Winterhalter's transition, Christian Brickman took the CEO role. Effective June 2, 2014, Brickman was the company's president and COO. Brickman stepped down from this role in September 2021. The current president and CEO is Denise Paulonis, effective October 1, 2021. Diana S. Ferguson has been Chair of the Board since January 2023.
