= Department of Computer Science (Purdue University) =

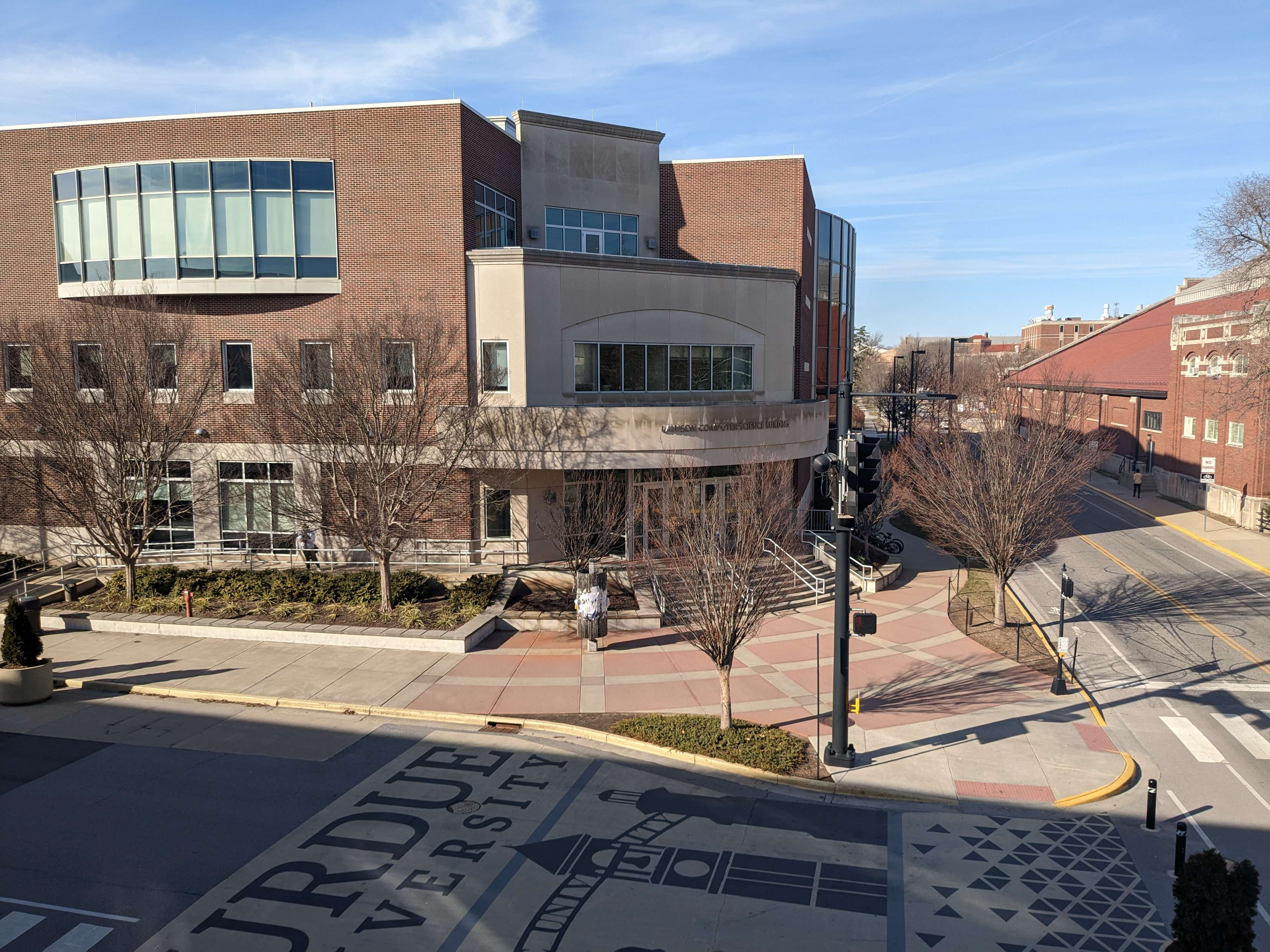
- Type: Academic department
- Established: October 24, 1962
- Department Head: Petros Drineas
- Location: 305 N University St, West Lafayette, Indiana, 49707, United States
- Website: https://cs.purdue.edu

The Department of Computer Science is an academic department within Purdue University specializing in computer science. It was the first computer science department established in an American university.

== History ==
The first computer Purdue installed was an IBM card-programmed electronic calculator in 1952 for Carl Kossack's statistical laboratory. In October 1954, Alan Perlis proposed and acquired a more powerful Datatron 204. It was used to create the Purdue Datatron compiler, one of the first algebraic compilers created. In December 1960, Purdue Research Foundation and Remington Rand came to an agreement to install a Univac Solid State 80 allowing Purdue to be the first university to schedule its students' courses by a computer. Two years later it was replaced with an IBM 1401 and a planned complementary IBM 7044 was superseded by an IBM 7090. On October 24, 1962, Purdue's board of trustees approved splitting the college's Division of Mathematical Sciences into three academic departments: mathematics, statistics, and computer science. This ratification establishes Purdue as the first computer science department in a US university. The Computer Sciences Center, which had been split from Kossack's original laboratory, would assist with computing services for the entire university and teach programming for machines.

Samuel Conte served as head of the Computer Sciences Center and lead the newly formed computer science department. The department started with seven instructors including Conte. M.S. and Ph.D. programs were initially the only degrees offered with B.S. degrees added in fall 1968. Prospective graduate students were required to take ten courses including three from each of the main areas of the department: numerical methods, programming systems, and theoretical computer science. Numeric analysis and theory had well-established foundations for Ph.D. programs to build on while programming systems was more nebulous with Saul Rosen's experience helping evaluate theses.

From 1970 to 1980, the number of regular faculty increased from 15 to 22 but the department still lacked sufficient instructors relying on graduate teaching assistants. During this time period, the department was rated in the top ten computer science departments but lacked scientific respectability from their science and engineering peers. Several courses required overhauls which improved courses but professors lacked manpower to keep classes current. In 1979, Conte stepped down as department head succeeded by Peter J. Denning.

Student enrollment increased dramatically entering the 1980s from 350 students in fall 1980 to 550 the next year. The university's administration opposed limiting incoming computer science freshmen but lacked the computing resources to support the courses. Denning resigned in 1983 with John Rice taking over as acting head and eventually taking up the full role a year and a half later. In 1984, the Memorial Gym was selected to be remodeled and house the department tripling space and increasing the capacity of undergraduate and graduate majors. Following the student enrollment crisis, a five-year plan was developed in 1986 to increase the quality of the department which included new faculty appointments, smaller class sizes, and tripling research funding. That same year, incoming registrations relented—dropping below 200 new students—signalling the end of the undergraduate influx. The growing pains from the 1980s caused the department's national ranking to fall from the top ten to the high teens.

By the mid-1990s, another computer science enrollment wave swept American universities. Conflict over space and resources between Rice and Harry Morrison, the Dean of the College of Science, led to Rice resigning as head in late July 1995. Wayne Dyksen became acting head in May 1996, replaced by Ahmed Sameh in January 1997.

To handle large enrollment increases and to centralize teaching, research, and offices originally spread across five buildings, a new building for the discipline was proposed. A facility costing $20 million was proposed with the state pledging $13 million with $7 million to be contributed by private donors. Richard and Patricia Lawson gave $4.7 million, the largest donation, to the project thereby resulting in the building being named after them. In 2002, Susanne Hambrusch succeeded Sameh as head of the department. Aditya Mathur took over from Hambrusch as department head in 2007 but later resigned from the leadership role in 2010 citing a lack of a computer science major in the College of Engineering. Sunil Prabhakar was appointed interim head and later became the department head in 2012. In 2019, Dongyan Xu filled the department head role. The head of the computer science department from 2020 to 2023 was again Sunil Prabhakar. In 2023, Chris Clifton became interim department head before being succeeded by Petros Drineas in 2024.

== People ==
=== Notable faculty ===
- Mikhail Atallah
- Bedrich Benes
- Elisa Bertino
- Douglas Comer
- Tamal Dey
- Petros Drineas
- Ahmed K. Elmagarmid
- Sonia Fahmy
- Walter Gautschi
- Susanne Hambrusch
- John R. Rice
- Ahmed Sameh
- Gene Spafford
- Wojciech Szpankowski
- Samuel S. Wagstaff Jr.

=== Notable alumni ===
- Rick Adams
- Len Bass
- Raymond F. Boyce
- Dorothy E. Denning
- Kevin C. Dittman
- Dan Farmer
- Norman E. Gibbs
- Michael T. Goodrich
- Ihab Ilyas
- Deborah Joseph
- Markus Kuhn
- Lawrence Landweber
- Ian Murdock
- Larry L. Peterson
- John T. Riedl
- Susan H. Rodger
- Athena Vakali, professor
- Jeffrey L. Whitten, professor
- Aidong Zhang, professor
