= Systems analysis =

Problem-solving technique that breaks down a system into its component pieces

Systems analysis is "the process of studying a procedure or business to identify its goal and purposes and create systems and procedures that will efficiently achieve them". Another view sees systems analysis as a problem-solving technique that breaks a system down into its component pieces and analyses how well those parts work and interact to accomplish their purpose.

The field of system analysis relates closely to requirements analysis or to operations research. It is also "an explicit formal inquiry carried out to help a decision maker identify a better course of action and make a better decision than they might otherwise have made."

The terms analysis and synthesis stem from Greek, meaning "to take apart" and "to put together", respectively. These terms are used in many scientific disciplines, from mathematics and logic to economics and psychology, to denote similar investigative procedures. The analysis is defined as "the procedure by which we break down an intellectual or substantial whole into parts," while synthesis means "the procedure by which we combine separate elements or components to form a coherent whole." System analysis researchers apply methodology to the systems involved, forming an overall picture.

System analysis is used in every field where something is developed. Analysis can also be a series of components that perform organic functions together, such as systems engineering. Systems engineering is an interdisciplinary field of engineering that focuses on how complex engineering projects should be designed and managed.

== Information technology ==
The development of a computer-based information system includes a system analysis phase. This helps produce the data model, a precursor to creating or enhancing a database. There are several different approaches to system analysis. When a computer-based information system is developed, system analysis (according to the Waterfall model) would constitute the following steps:

- The development of a feasibility study: determining whether a project is economically, socially, technologically, and organizationally feasible
- Fact-finding measures, designed to ascertain the requirements of the system's end-users (typically involving interviews, questionnaires, or visual observations of work on the existing system)
- Gauging how the end-users would operate the system (in terms of general experience in using computer hardware or software), what the system would be used for, and so on

Another view outlines a phased approach to the process. This approach breaks system analysis into 5 phases:

- Scope Definition: Clearly defined objectives and requirements necessary to meet a project's requirements as defined by its stakeholders
- Problem analysis: the process of understanding problems and needs and arriving at solutions that meet them
- Requirements analysis: determining the conditions that need to be met
- Logical design: looking at the logical relationship among the objects
- Decision analysis: making a final decision

Use cases are widely used system analysis modeling tools for identifying and expressing the functional requirements of a system. Each use case is a business scenario or event for which the system must provide a defined response. Use cases evolved from the object-oriented analysis.

== Policy analysis ==
The discipline of what is today known as policy analysis originated from the application of system analysis when it was first instituted by United States Secretary of Defense Robert McNamara.

== Practitioners ==
Practitioners of system analysis are often called up to dissect systems that have grown haphazardly to determine the current components of the system. This was shown during the year 2000 re-engineering effort as business and manufacturing processes were examined as part of the Y2K automation upgrades. Employment utilizing system analysis include system analyst, business analyst, manufacturing engineer, systems architect, enterprise architect, software architect, etc.

While practitioners of system analysis can be called upon to create new systems, they often modify, expand, or document existing systems (processes, procedures, and methods). Researchers and practitioners rely on system analysis. Activity system analysis has been already applied to various research and practice studies, including business management, educational reform, educational technology, etc.

== See also ==
Related topics

- System thinking
- System architecture
- Software architecture
- Enterprise architecture
- Systems analyst
- Systems design
- Policy analysis
- Program designer
- Cybernetics
- Systems theory

Types of system analysis

- Accident analysis
- Business analysis
- Cost-effectiveness analysis / cost–benefit analysis
- DSRP
- Failure analysis
- Logico-linguistic modeling
- Morphological analysis
- Soft systems methodology
- Software prototyping
- Spiral model
- Waterfall model

System thinkers

- Donella Meadows
- Nancy Leveson
- Russell L. Ackoff
- Howard T. Odum
- Henry Paynter
- Jay Forrester
- Gregory Bateson
- Stewart Brand
- Buckminster Fuller
- Robert S. McNamara
- Stafford Beer
- Ludwig von Bertalanffy

== Selected publications ==
- Bentley, Lonnie D., Kevin C. Dittman, and Jeffrey L. Whitten. System analysis and design methods. (1986, 1997, 2004).
- Hawryszkiewycz, Igor T. Introduction to system analysis and design. Prentice-Hall PTR, 1994.
- Whitten, Jeffery L., Lonnie D. Bentley, and Kevin C. Dittman. Fundamentals of system analysis and design methods. (2004).
