= Fahmy =

Fahmy is a given name. Notable people with the name include:

- Aly Fahmy Mohammed Aly Fahmi, Commander of the Egyptian Air Defense Forces and son of Mohammed Aly Fahmy
- Azza Fahmy, Egyptian jewellery designer
- Hussein Fahmy, Egyptian actor
- Ismail Fahmi or Fahmy, Egyptian Foreign Minister from 1973 to 1977
- Joud Fahmy, Saudi judoka
- Khaled Fahmy, Egyptian historian
- Mohammed Aly Fahmy, Chief of Staff of the Egyptian Armed Forces and participant in multiple armed conflicts
- Mohamed Fahmy, Egyptian-Canadian controversial author, journalist, and war correspondent
- Mohamed Fahmy, Egyptian visual artist
- Mourad Fahmy, Egyptian soccer player and coach
- Mustafa Fahmy, Egyptian actor
- Raed Fahmy Jahid, Iraqi Communist politician and Minister of Science and Technology from 2006 to 2010
- Sonia Fahmy, computer scientist
- Marguerite Alibert, or Princess Fahmy Bey, French courtesan and socialite
