= University of North Texas =

Public research university in Denton, Texas, U.S.

- Former names: Former name list: Texas Normal College and Teacher Training Institute (1890–1894); North Texas Normal College (1894–1901); North Texas State Normal College (1901–1923); North Texas State Teachers College (1923–1949); North Texas State College (1949–1961); North Texas State University (1961–1988)
- Type: Public research university
- Established: September 16, 1890; 136 years ago
- Parent institution: University of North Texas System
- Accreditation: SACS
- Academic affiliations: URA; ORAU; Space-grant
- Endowment: $1.536B ($356 million (FY2025) + UNT's TUF Share: $1.18 billion)
- Budget: $1.04 billion (FY2026)
- Chancellor: Michael R. Williams
- President: Harrison Keller
- Provost: Michael McPherson
- Faculty: 3,507 (fall 2024)
- Students: 46,940 (fall 2024)
- Undergraduates: 35,700 (fall 2024)
- Postgraduates: 12,010 (fall 2024)
- Location: Denton, Texas, United States; 33°12′35″N 97°9′0″W
- Campus: 1,063 acres (4.30 km^{2}); Suburban
- Newspaper: North Texas Daily
- Colors: Green and white
- Nickname: Mean Green
- Sporting affiliations: NCAA Division I – The American
- Mascot: Scrappy the Eagle
- Website: unt.edu

The University of North Texas (UNT) is a public research university in Denton, Texas, United States. It has an additional satellite campus in Frisco. It serves as the flagship of the University of North Texas System, which also includes universities in Dallas and Fort Worth. UNT offers 116 bachelor's, 87 master's, and 40 doctoral programs. It was founded in 1890.

UNT is classified as an "R1: Doctoral University – Very high research spending and doctorate production" by the Carnegie system, the highest Carnegie designation for U.S. research institutions. It is designated a Hispanic-Serving Institution and Minority-Serving Institution by the U.S. Department of Education. UNT is also designated as an Emerging Research University by the State of Texas and is one of four universities supported by the Texas University Fund (TUF), a permanent endowment with a current market value of $6.31 billion as of December 31, 2025, designed to help elevate participating universities into the top tier of national research institutions.

It was the 24th largest university in the United States by enrollment in 2023. As of fall 2024, UNT enrolled 46,180 students, making it the fourth-largest university in Texas. It is also the largest university in the Dallas–Fort Worth area. UNT shares Denton with Texas Woman's University, the largest primarily women's university in the United States. UNT's main campus covers 963 acres (3.90 km^{2}), with academic buildings to the north and athletic facilities, including DATCU Stadium, to the south. The university's research park, Discovery Park, spans 300 acres (1.2 km^{2}) and lies about five miles (8 km) to the north.

The university's athletic teams are the North Texas Mean Green. Its sixteen intercollegiate athletic teams compete in National Collegiate Athletic Association (NCAA) Division I. North Texas is a member of the American Conference (The American). UNT's official school colors are green and white and its mascot is an Eagle named Scrappy.

== Campus ==
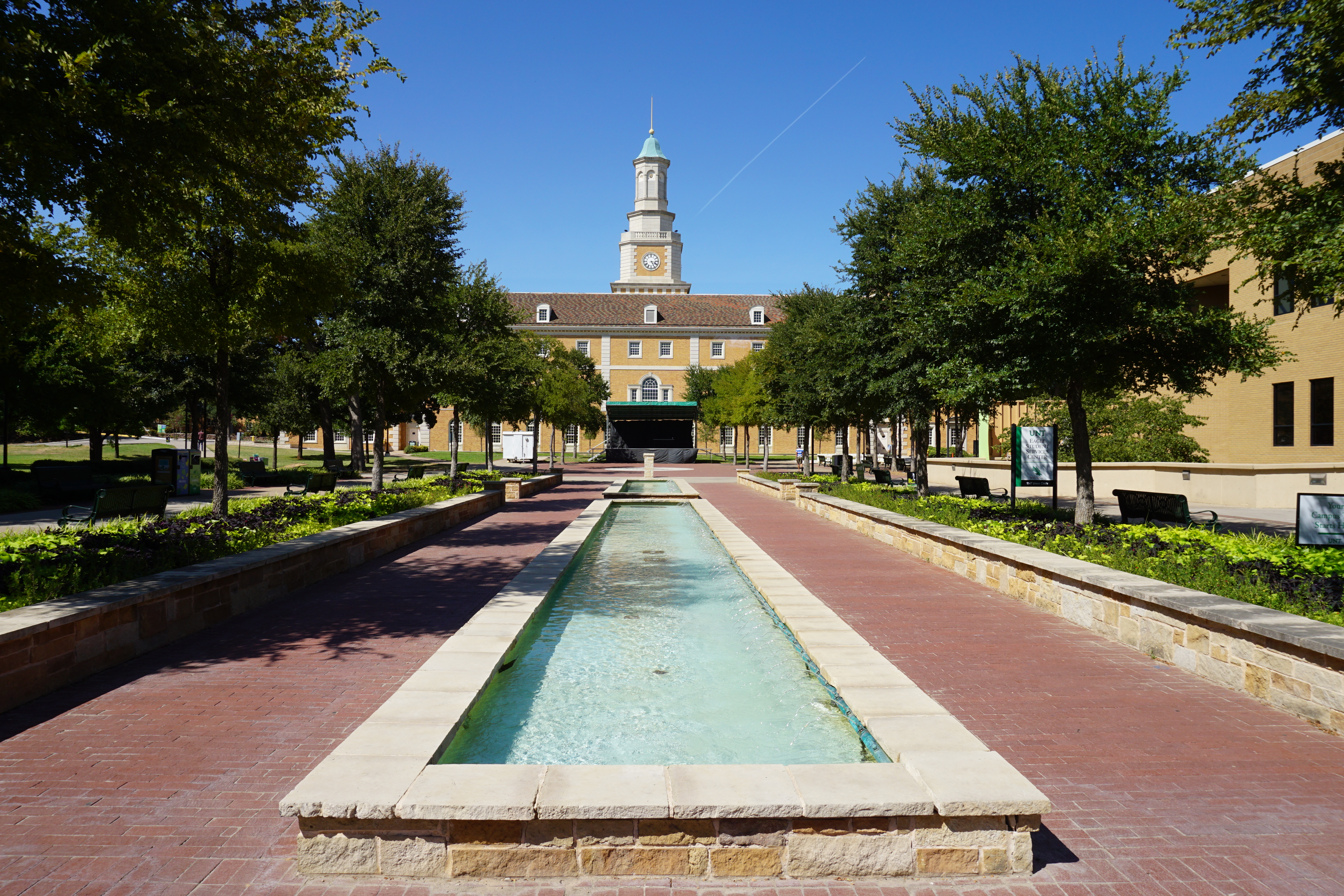
Hurley Administration Building

The University of North Texas's main campus is located in Denton, a city of approximately 170,000 in the northern part of the Dallas–Fort Worth metroplex, the fourth-largest metropolitan area in the United States. As the flagship of the University of North Texas System, UNT has steadily expanded its physical presence since 1975, when it acquired a medical school in Fort Worth.

In 1981, the medical school was reorganized as a separate institution under the UNT Board of Regents. In 2009, the University of North Texas at Dallas became the system's second stand-alone university. That same year, the Texas Legislature approved the creation of the University of North Texas at Dallas College of Law, which opened in 2014 in Downtown Dallas. The UNT System itself was established by the board of regents in 1980, 90 years after the founding of the university, and formally recognized by the 78th Legislature in 2003.

In 2004, UNT opened Discovery Park in Denton, a 300-acre (1.2 km^{2}) research and technology campus located five miles (8 km) north of the main campus. It houses facilities focused on science, engineering, and innovation. In 2011, the College of Visual Arts and Design opened the Design Research Center in Dallas's Design District.

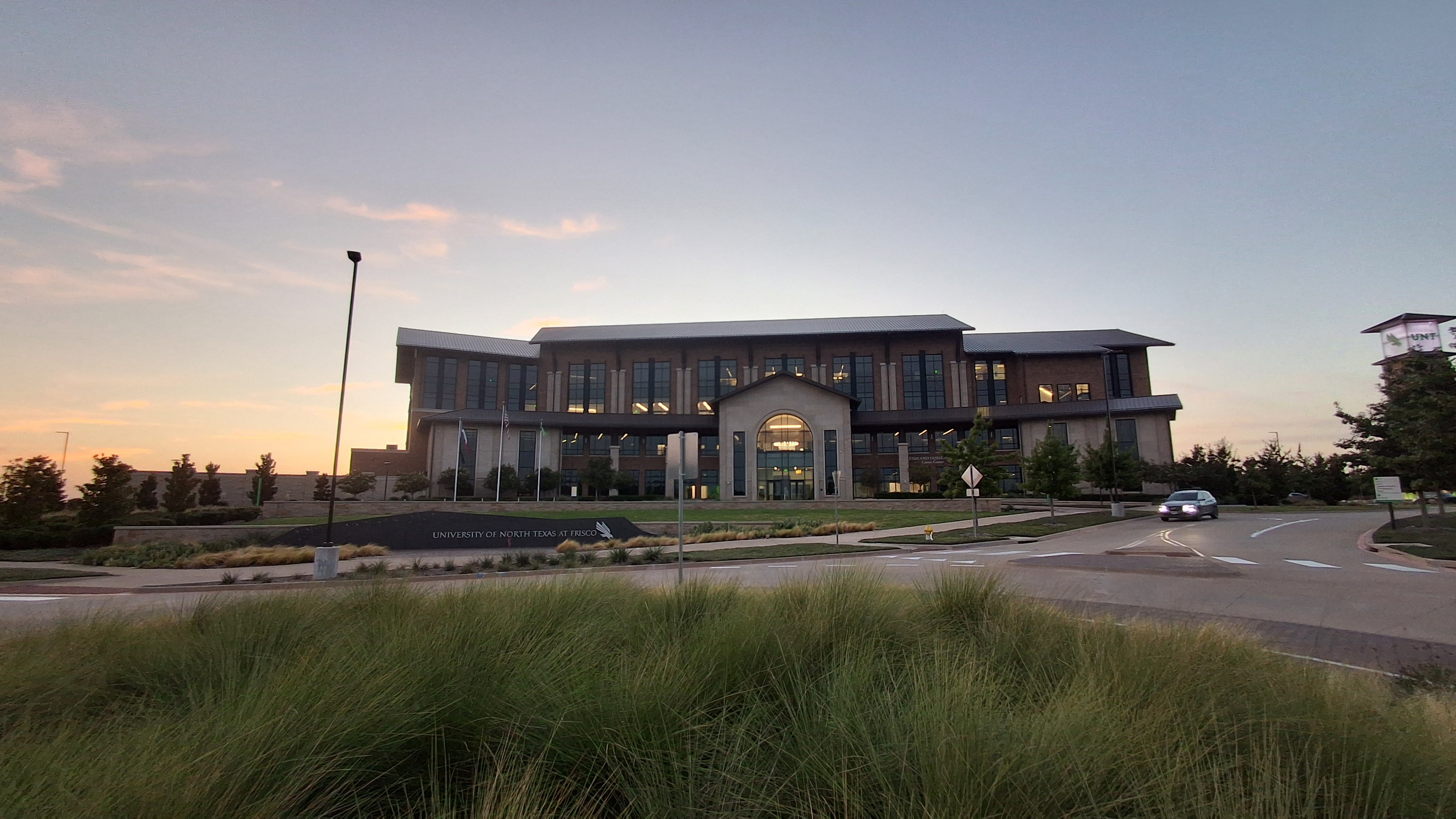
Campus at Frisco

To extend access to its academic and research programs, UNT Denton established a satellite campus in Frisco, a suburban city in the northern Dallas–Fort Worth area. Frisco is located approximately 30 miles (48 km) north of downtown Dallas and 25 miles (40 km) east of Denton. In 2018, UNT at Frisco opened Inspire Park and now serves about 2,000 students each semester across several Frisco and Collin County sites, including Hall Park and the Collin Higher Education Center in McKinney. In 2020, the Texas Higher Education Coordinating Board approved the development of a new UNT branch campus on a 100-acre (0.40 km^{2}) site donated by the city of Frisco.

== Academics ==
Academic rankings
National
| Forbes | 209 |
| U.S. News & World Report | 208 (tie) |
| Washington Monthly | 126 |
| WSJ/College Pulse | 272 |
Global
| ARWU | 501–600 |
| QS | 901–950 |
| U.S. News & World Report | 714 (tie) |

UNT offers 114 bachelor's, 97 master's, and 39 doctoral degree programs as of 2024. These are organized into 14 colleges and schools. UNT has been accredited by the Southern Association of Colleges and Schools since 1925. As of 2020, the university was home to 37 research centers and institutes. Twelve discipline-based academic units comprise the university's academic structure — including eleven colleges and the Mayborn School of Journalism — along with the Honors College, the Toulouse Graduate School, and the Texas Academy of Mathematics and Science, a selective residential program for high school juniors and seniors, in which students complete their final two years of high school while earning two years of transferable college credit.

In 1976, the Carnegie Foundation designated North Texas as a "Class 1 Doctorate-Granting Institution." Four decades later, in February 2016, it was reclassified as a Doctoral University with "Highest Research Activity," also known as the R1 category. In 1992, UNT was elected to full membership in the Association of Public and Land-grant Universities. (Note: Although the Association includes land-grant institutions, UNT is not one.) In 2011, it was designated an Emerging Research Institution by the Texas Higher Education Coordinating Board.

In 2020, the university received dual federal designations from the U.S. Department of Education as a Minority-Serving Institution (MSI) and a Hispanic-Serving Institution (HSI), making it eligible for federal grants under Titles III and V of the Higher Education Act. In 2023, the state of Texas established the Texas University Fund (TUF) to expand and support research initiatives at four Texas universities, including the University of North Texas, to elevate their national profiles. The Texas University Fund began with an initial funding of $3.9 billion and receives an annual allocation of $100 million as a permanent endowment.

=== Undergraduate admissions ===
In 2025, University of North Texas accepted 72.5% of undergraduate applicants with those enrolled having an average 3.46 high school GPA. The university does not require submission of standardized test scores, but they will be considered as part of an application if submitted. Those enrolled who submitted test scores had an average 1110 SAT score (43% submitting scores) or an average 23 ACT score (10% submitting scores).

=== College of Liberal Arts & Social Sciences ===
The College of Liberal Arts & Social Sciences houses 22 academic departments and programs and five public services (including a psychology clinic and a speech and hearing clinic), and eight student services (of which seven are labs).

====== UNT Debate and Speech Team ======
The College of Liberal Arts & Social Sciences is home to multiple extracurricular opportunities including Debate.

The UNT Debate Team, participates actively in the NDT (National Debate Tournament), CEDA (Cross-Examination Debate Association), NFA (National Forensics Association), and IPDA (International Public Debate Association) and attends 15-20 tournaments each year. Since 1983, North Texas has qualified for the NDT 25 times. In the 2021-2022 season, the UNT Debate team was ranked 2nd in the nation by the National Forensics Association.

In the 2025-2026 Season the team sent a team of two freshmen Ronen Bowman & Emanuel Vargas to the National Debate Tournament. As well as the university getting their highest national placement in IPDA history, as in Team IPDA Senior Freddie Smith & Sophomore Jack Hasper placed fifth in the nation.

=== College of Science ===
UNT has been offering Bachelor of Science degrees for 109 years, Master of Science degrees (in biology, mathematics, chemistry, and economics) for 91 years, and Doctor of Philosophy degrees in several scientific disciplines—including chemistry, biology, and physics—for 62 years. UNT is a sponsoring institution member (Ph.D.-granting) of Oak Ridge Associated Universities (ORAU), a consortium of 105 major research universities that leverage scientific research through partnerships with national laboratories, government agencies, and private industry. It has been a member of the consortium since 1954.

==== Department of Physics ====
The College of Science's Department of Physics houses a distinctive research facility, the Ion Beam Laboratory (IBL), which conducts multidisciplinary research using medium-energy ion accelerators (10 keV–15 MeV). IBL supports analytical and materials science research through techniques such as particle-induced X-ray emission (PIXE), Rutherford backscattering (RBS), elastic recoil detection (ERD), nuclear reaction analysis (NRA), ion microlithography, and ion beam-induced charge collection (IBICC).

The facility includes four accelerators: a 3 MV tandem Pelletron, a 3 MV single-ended Pelletron, a 2.5 MV Van de Graaff accelerator, and a 200 keV Cockcroft–Walton accelerator. These systems enable beamline setups for ion implantation, scanning transmission ion microscopy (STIM), and high-energy focused ion beam (HEFIB) microprobe analysis. The IBL occupies approximately 4,000 sq ft (370 m^{2}) in the Physics Building (main Denton campus) and supports graduate research, external collaborations, and experimental development across multiple disciplines. UNT has hosted the Conference on the Application of Accelerators in Research and Industry (CAARI) in even-numbered years since 1976.

==== Department of Biology ====
The College of Science's Department of Biological Sciences supports interdisciplinary research in environmental science, ecology, and molecular biology through a range of specialized facilities. The Life Sciences Complex includes more than 176,000 sq ft (16,400 m^{2}) of LEED Gold-certified research space, including rooftop greenhouses and one of the nation's largest university aquatics labs. The department also operates the Water Research Field Station and Artificial Stream Facility, among the few in the U.S. designed to assess the ecological impact of agrichemicals under controlled field conditions. UNT researchers maintain global collaborations, including a freshwater research and environmental philosophy field station established in 2011 in the Cape Horn Biosphere Reserve in Chile. UNT's work in limnology dates back to the 1930s under pioneer Joseph Kean Gwynn Silvey (1907–1989), and continues today through its aquatic ecology labs and the Institute of Applied Science.

The Water Research Field Station and the Artificial Stream Facility are located in Ponder, about 10 miles (16 km) west of UNT's main campus, near the university's Rafes Urban Astronomy Center and Soil Conservation Service Site Number 12 Reservoir.

=== G. Brint Ryan College of Business ===
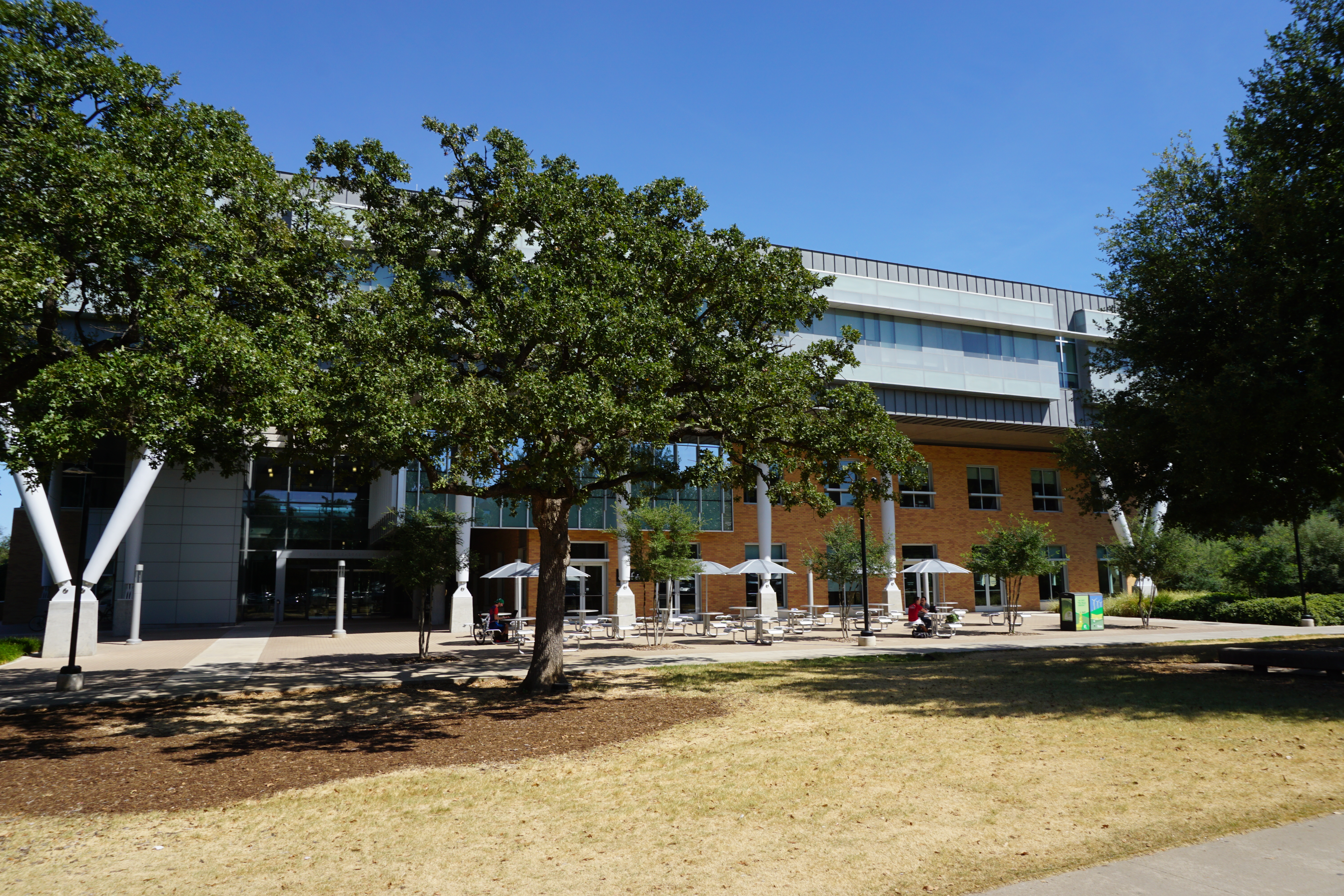
The Business Leadership Building houses the College of Business

The College of Business is host to five academic departments: (i) Accounting, (ii) Finance, Insurance, Real Estate and Law, (iii) Information Technology and Decision Sciences, (iv) Marketing, Logistics, and Operations Management, and (v) Management. It offers seven undergraduate programs, fourteen M.B.A. and master of science programs, and six Ph.D. programs. In Fall 2011, the college moved into a new state-of-the-art Gold LEED certified $70 million facility named the Business Leadership Building. The college is accredited in both business and accounting by the Association to Advance Collegiate Schools of Business—accreditation for the former stretches back sixty-five years (1961) and the latter, thirty-nine years (1987).

In 2018, 5,093 students were enrolled as business majors at the undergraduate level.

=== College of Education ===
The College of Education is a legacy of the university's founding as a teachers college one hundred and thirty-six years ago. The college is organized as four departments and one center: (i) Counseling and Higher Education, (ii) Educational Psychology, (iii) Kinesiology, Health Promotion and Recreation, (iv) Teacher Education and Administration, and (v) The Kristin Farmer Autism Center. The college offers 12 bachelor's degrees, 19 master's degrees and 15 doctoral concentrations. As of the 2010–2011 school year, the college certified over 1,147 teachers, the second largest number in the state by a university. In 1979, the Texas Higher Education Coordinating Board approved renaming the "School of Education" to the "College of Education." At that time, the college was the largest in Texas and the Southwest, the largest doctoral program in the state, and the twenty-fifth largest producer of teacher certificates in the United States. Its prior name, "School of Education," dates back to 1946, when the teachers college outgrew itself and reorganized as six schools and colleges.

=== College of Engineering ===
The College of Engineering was established in 2003, building upon long-standing programs in computer science (since 1971) and aspects of mechanical engineering dating back to 1919, when related coursework was first offered at what was then a teachers college. As of Fall 2025, the college offers 12 undergraduate majors, 7 minors, 6 undergraduate academic certificates, 10 master's programs, and 5 doctoral degrees across disciplines including biomedical engineering, computer science, electrical engineering, mechanical and energy engineering, cybersecurity, and materials science.

In 2009, UNT launched the Net-Centric Software and Systems Center (NCSS), a net-centric (in contrast to data-centric computing) research consortium and National Science Foundation Industry–University Cooperative Research Center (I/UCRC). In addition to UNT, the consortium is composed of the University of Texas at Dallas, Southern Methodist University, and Arizona State University. Its mission is to advance secure, resilient, and efficient software and hardware systems for networked and cloud computing environments. Research areas include emerging processing architectures, (Note: Emerging processing architectures are novel or experimental computing designs that go beyond traditional CPUs. These include manycore systems, heterogeneous architectures, neuromorphic chips, domain-specific accelerators, and application-specific processors.) service-oriented architectures, and dynamic service composition. (Note: Dynamic service composition refers to the automated assembly or reconfiguration of software services at runtime, enabling systems to adapt to changing requirements or environments.) The center is primarily funded by industry members and has conducted projects on multicore optimization and adaptive software components.

Three of the six academic certificates offered to undergraduate engineering majors include (i) Artificial Intelligence, (ii) Game Programming, and (iii) Security.

=== College of Information ===
The College of Information was created in October 2008 by consolidating two existing academic units: Learning Technologies (formerly within the College of Education) and the School of Library and Information Sciences. The School of Library and Information Services was created in 1970 as an outgrowth of its former structure as the Department of Library Services. Currently, the college consists of the Department of Linguistics, the Department of Learning Technologies, the Department of Information Science, and the Anuradha and Vikas Sinha Department of Data Science.

=== College of Merchandising, Hospitality and Tourism ===
The College of Merchandising, Hospitality and Tourism (CMHT) offers interdisciplinary programs focused on consumer experience, retail, events, hospitality, and tourism. Undergraduate degrees include majors in Digital Retailing, Event Design and Experience Management, Hospitality Management, Merchandising, and Consumer Experience Management. The Event Design and Experience Management degree is the only Bachelor of Science of its kind in Texas, emphasizing hands-on experience and event technology.

Graduate programs include Master of Science degrees in Hospitality Management, International Sustainable Tourism, Merchandising and Digital Retailing, and Hospitality & Tourism Data Analytics. The M.S. in International Sustainable Tourism, jointly offered with the Tropical Agricultural Research and Higher Education Center (Centro Agronómico Tropical de Investigación y Enseñanza → CATIE) in Costa Rica, was the first of its kind in the U.S. Students have access to minors and certificates across retail, hospitality, and merchandising, with career-focused events and industry partnerships supporting applied learning.

=== College of Music ===
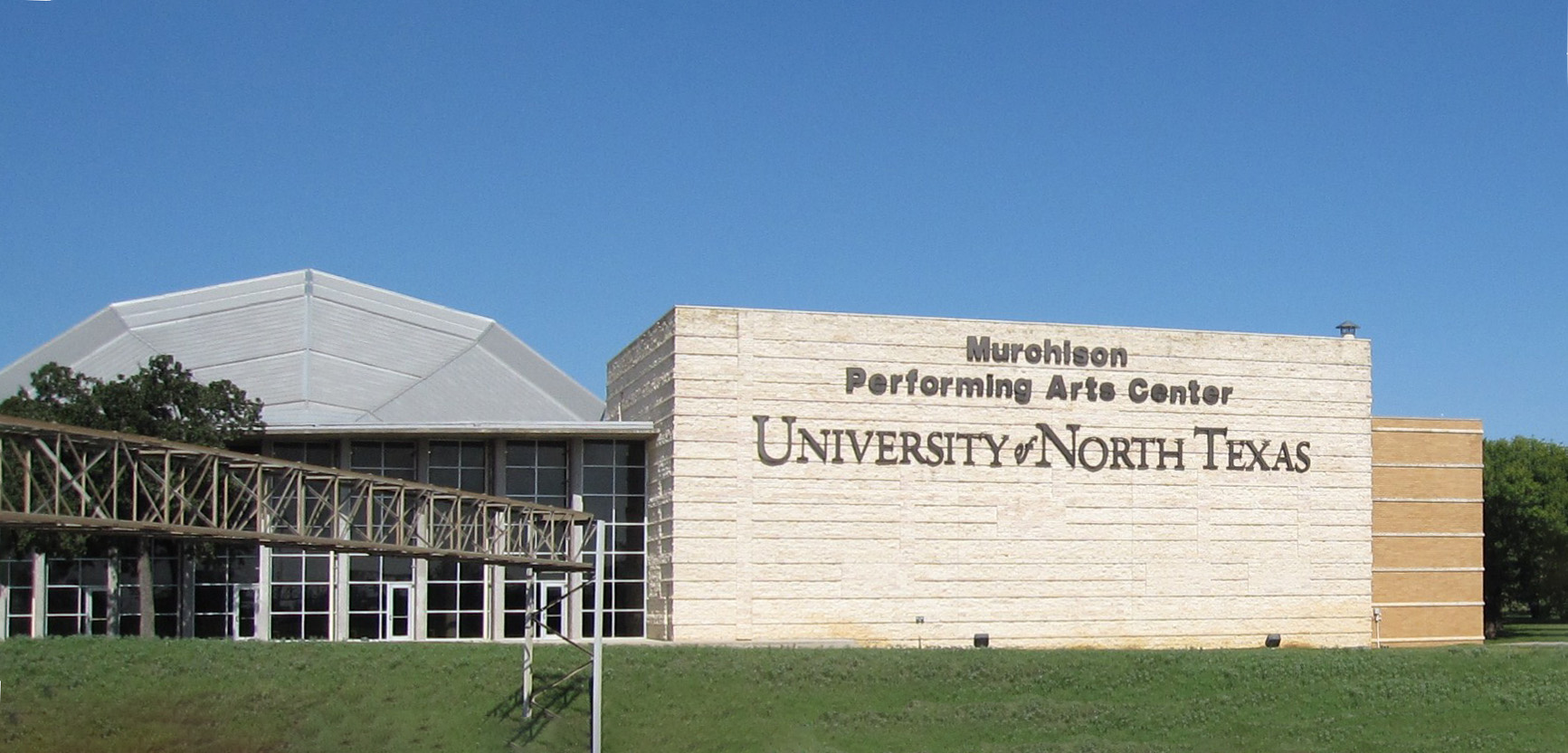
Murchison Performing Arts Center

The College of Music dates back one hundred and thirty-six years, when North Texas was founded. The college has the largest enrollment of any music institution accredited by the National Association of Schools of Music. It has been among the largest music institutions of higher learning in North America since the 1940s. The music library, founded in 1941, has one of the largest music collections in the United States, with over 300,000 volumes of books, periodicals, scores, and approximately 900,000 sound recordings. North Texas was first in the world to offer a degree in jazz studies. U.S. News & World Report ranked the jazz studies program as the best in the country every year from 1994, when it began ranking graduate jazz programs, to 1997, when it retired the category. The university's jazz ensemble One O'Clock Lab Band has been nominated for seven Grammy Awards.

=== College of Health and Public Service ===
Previously called the College of Public Affairs and Community Service (PACS) and before that the College of Community Service, the college adopted its current name in Fall 2017. The college is organized in seven departments: Audiology and Speech-Language Pathology; Behavior Analysis; Criminal Justice; Emergency Management and Disaster Science (UNT purports that it was the first American university to offer such a program, having done so in 1983); Public Administration; Rehabilitation and Health Services; and Social Work.

UNT and Texas Woman's University launched a joint Master of Social Work (M.S.W.) program in 2017. In 2024, UNT replaced the joint program with its own independent M.S.W. degree to accommodate growing student demand. The new program includes both a traditional 60-hour track and an advanced standing option, with practicum placements coordinated through nearly 100 partner agencies across the Dallas–Fort Worth area.

=== College of Visual Arts and Design ===
The College of Visual Arts and Design has the 10th largest enrollment of any art and design school accredited by the National Association of Schools of Art and Design, and the second largest of any that awards doctorates. The college name changes reflect the curricular expansion of programs. In 1992, what then had been the "Department of Art" within the College of Arts and Sciences, became "School of Visual Arts;" and in 2007, it became the "College of Visual Arts and Design." Art classes began at UNT in 1894, four years after its founding. Master's degrees were initiated in the 1930s and the first Master of Science degree in art was awarded in 1937 that was started by Stanley Marcus in 1938.

=== Frank W. and Sue Mayborn School of Journalism ===
Curricular journalism at North Texas dates back to 1945. As a department, Journalism eventually became part of the College of Arts and Sciences. The Graduate Division of Journalism began in the fall of 1970 under the direction of Reginald Conway Westmorland, PhD (1926–2021). In 1999, twelve years after the death of Frank Willis Mayborn (1903–1987), its graduate program was renamed the Frank W. Mayborn Graduate Institute of Journalism. On September 1, 2009, the entire program was elevated as its own collegiate unit and named the Frank W. and Sue Mayborn School of Journalism. Eight Pulitzer Prizes have been won by five of its alumni, among whom are Bill Moyers and Howard Swindle. Other notable alumni include Samir Husni and Cragg Hines. Since 1969, the news-editorial sequence has been accredited by the Association for Education in Journalism and Mass Communication (AEJMC); and since 1986, the entire program has been accredited. In the fall each year, the School hosts its annual Mayborn Literary Nonfiction Conference.

=== Honors College ===
The Honors College offers academic enrichments, including honors seminars and exclusive classes for high-achieving undergraduates. Its objective is to challenge exceptional students at higher levels and to promote leadership. The college is an autonomous collegiate unit on equal footing with the other collegiate units. Academically, it offers no degrees, but its courses are integrated with the baccalaureate programs of the other ten constituent colleges and the journalism school. Graduates are awarded a special medallion.

=== Toulouse Graduate School ===
The Toulouse Graduate School, founded in 1946, is the academic custodian and administrator of all graduate programs offered by ten colleges and one school. It maintains records, administers admissions, and serves various roles in recruiting. It was renamed in 1990 in honor of Robert Bartell Toulouse, EdD (1918–2017), who joined in 1948 as a professor in the College of Education, then served dean of the Graduate School from 1954 to 1982. Toulouse, before retiring as professor emeritus, had served other roles at the university, including provost and vice president of academic affairs from 1982 to 1985.

=== Texas Academy of Mathematics and Science ===
TAMS is a two-year residential early college entrance program that has, since 1987, admitted Texas high school students—typically rising juniors—through a competitive academic selection process. Students complete their final two years of high school while living on campus and earning transferable college credit. It was the first program of its kind in the United States and, as of 2012, remained the only one in Texas and one of five nationally.

=== The Intensive English Language Institute (IELI) ===
Established in 1977, IELI serves international students who wish to learn academic English in preparation for university studies in the United States. IELI is a constituent of UNT International Affairs, an interdisciplinary unit and exponent of globalization in higher education that provides leadership and support of international teaching, research, and study-abroad initiatives. As of July 2015, IELI has been located in Marquis Hall on the UNT Denton campus.

== Libraries ==
UNT Libraries are made up of four public service points and two remote storage facilities. Willis Library is the main library on campus, housing the business, economics, education, humanities and social sciences collections along with microforms and special areas such as the Music Library, Government Documents, the Digital Library Division, Archives, and the Rare Book and Texana collections. The Media Library in Chilton Hall houses a large collection of audiovisual materials, including films, audiobooks, and video games (see Game Design, above). Video recording equipment and gaming consoles are available for checkout. The Sycamore Library houses the government documents, law, political science, geography and business collections. It also houses the Collaboration and Learning Commons, a place to study in groups, create multi-media projects, and record presentations. The Discovery Park Library supports the College of Engineering and the College of Information, Library Science, and Technologies. It covers multiple areas of engineering, library and information science, and learning technology.

== Enrollment ==
UNT reached a record enrollment of 46,940 in the fall of 2023. It is the largest university in Dallas–Fort Worth metroplex and third largest public university in the state of Texas. For the 2022 academic year, the university awarded 12,352 degrees. UNT awarded 315 Ph.D. degrees in fiscal year 2022.

As of 2024, student-faculty ratio at UNT is 26:1 and 29.5 percent of its classes consist of fewer than 20 students. The most popular degrees for 2022 graduates are multi/interdisciplinary studies, psychology, general studies, biological sciences, exercise science, marketing, criminal justice, accounting, education, and finance. As of 2024, UNT has a student graduation rate (Note: The student graduation rate is the proportion of students who graduate within 8 years of entering UNT for the first time.) of 62%, compared to the national median 4-year university student graduation rate of 58%.

== Student life ==
Undergraduate demographics as of Fall 2024
| Race and ethnicity | Total |
|---|---|
| White | 36% |
| Hispanic | 30% |
| Black | 16% |
| Asian | 8% |
| International student | 4% |
| Two or more races | 4% |
| Unknown | 1% |
Economic diversity
| Low-income (Note: The percentage of students who received an income-based federal Pell grant intended for low-income students.) | 36% |
| Affluent (Note: The percentage of students who are a part of the American middle class at the bare minimum.) | 64% |

=== Residential life ===
All freshmen are required to live on campus to satisfy a residency requirement. As of the Fall of 2022, 6,292 (14.9%) students live in campus residence halls; 8,068 (19.1%) live in the city of Denton; 4,810 (11.4%) live outside of the city of Denton but within Denton County; and 22,998 (54.5%) live outside of Denton County.

=== Student residence halls ===
There are 14 residence halls on the Denton campus. UNT also offers the Residents Engaged in Academic Living (REAL) Communities program. The REAL communities offer students the ability to live with other residents in their major, and allow them to interact with each other and participate in programs that are geared toward their major or discipline. On Aug. 22, 2011, sixty-two-year-old Maple Street Hall became the first all-vegan ("Mean Greens") college cafeteria in the country. The given 14 residence halls at the University of North Texas are : Bruce Hall, Clark Hall, Crumley Hall, Joe Greene Hall, Honors Hall, Kerr Hall, Legends Hall, Maple Hall, Mozart Square, Rawlins Hall, Santa Fe Square, Traditions Hall, Victory Hall, West Hall.

The Pohl Recreation Center is the student recreation center located on the campus of the University of North Texas.

=== Social Greek organizations ===
The social Greek community is made-up of four councils that oversee 42 fraternities and sororities. In 2015, approximately 4% of students were members of fraternities and 5% were members of sororities. Fraternities and sororities at North Texas offer students an opportunity to engage in community service, build strong friendships, and develop leadership skills.

== Traditions ==
In High Places (1990) by Gerald Balciar

=== Primary colors ===
North Texas adopted green and white as its official colors during the 1902–1903 school year. The university also uses black but only as a tertiary color.

=== Mascot ===
UNT's mascot, the American eagle, was adopted on February 1, 1922, as a result of a student-faculty council debate and ensuing student election.

The eagle has had two nicknames, beginning with "Scrappy" in 1950. The green and white human costumed eagle character, launched in 1963, carried the name "Scrappy" until 1974—during the throes of the Vietnam War—when students adopted the name "Eppy" because it sounded less warlike. Since then, the name has switched back from Eppy to Scrappy; and for the last thirty-one years, the name "Scrappy" has endured.

=== Nickname for intercollegiate athletics ===
The name "Mean Green," now in its sixtieth year, was adopted by fans and media in 1966 for a North Texas football defensive squad that finished the season second in the nation against the rush. That season, Joe Greene, then a sophomore at North Texas, played left defensive tackle on the football team and competed in track and field (shot put). The nickname "Mean Joe Greene" caught-on during his first year with the Pittsburgh Steelers in 1969, when some fans wrongly assumed that "Mean Green" was derived from a nickname that Greene had inherited while at North Texas. The North Texas athletic department, media, and fans loved the novelty of the national use of its nickname, and its association with Joe Greene's surname and university's official school color. By 1968, "Mean Green" was branded on the backs of shirts, buttons, bumper stickers, and the cover of the North Texas football brochure.

=== Fight song ===
Francis Edwin Stroup, EdD (1909–2010), emerged in 1939 — ten years after graduating from North Texas — as the winning composer (lyrics and music) of a university sponsored fight song competition organized by Floyd Graham. He taught summers at North Texas from 1939 to 1942. The song, "Fight, North Texas," has endured for eighty-seven years and the lyrics have changed minimally to reflect the name changes of the university. While serving as an associate professor at the University of Wyoming from 1946 to 1950, Stroup rewrote the lyrics for the chorus to "Ragtime Cowboy Joe," which was adopted in 1961 as the university's fight song. After serving as head of the Physical Education Department at Southern Arkansas University from 1950 to 1959, Stroup became Professor of Physical Education at Northern Illinois University. While there, Stroup rewrote the lyrics to the chorus of Alonzo Neil Annas' (1882–1966) NIU "Loyalty Song" (1942), which was informally adopted in 1961 and officially in 1963 as the "Huskie Fight Song." Stroup also composed songs for Drake University and the University of Chicago. A collegiate academician who played piano mostly by ear and neither majored nor worked in music, Stroup lived to be 101, a number exceeding the songs he composed by one digit. Stroup was inducted in the Halls of Fame of Northern Illinois University and the University of North Texas (1987).

=== Alma mater ===
In 1919, Julia Smith (1905–1989), while a music student, and Charles Kirby Langford (1903–1931), then a third-year letterman on the football team and an outstanding overall athlete, composed "Glory to the Green and White" which was adopted as the school's alma mater in 1922. Smith wrote the music and Langford wrote the lyrics.

=== Other traditions ===
The Spirit Bell—a 2,000 lb (910 kg) bell brought from Michigan in 1891—was a curfew bell from 1892 to 1928. The Talons, a spirit and service organization formed in 1960, acquired it in the 1964, mounted it on a wagon, and began the tradition of running it around the football field to rally fans. It was retired to the University Union in 1982 after it developed a crack. A similar 1,600 lb (730 kg) Spirit Bell is currently in use at games. A different organization by the name "Talons" was founded in 1926 as the first social fraternity at North Texas. On Homecoming Fridays, the Talons light a bonfire built from wooden pallets, typically in a 40-by-40-by-25-foot-height structure. The tradition has endured since the 1930s.

"Boomer" is a cannon fired by the Talons at football games since the 1970s. It is a 7/8th scale M1841 6 pound, smooth bore muzzleloader, resting on hand-crafted solid oak from the campus. Talon alumni have restored it three times, the most recent being in the fall of 2007, adding a custom limber for transport and equipment.

The Mean Green Machine, a green and black 1931 Ford Model A Tudor Sedan, is driven by the Talons Motorpool Committee at football games and special events. It was donated by alumnus Rex Cauble in 1974. In 2012, a team of engineering students installed a NetGain WarP 9 electric engine. As of 2016, the Mean Green Machine has been re-equipped with a modified Model A engine after complications with the electric engine.

McConnell Tower, the clock tower atop the Hurley Administration Building at the center of campus, is bathed in green light for victories. The clock is depicted on the official class ring with two different times on its faces: 1:00 (for the One O'Clock Lab Band) and 7:00—the curfew initiated in 1892.

The eagle talon hand signal is formed by curling the thumb and index and middle fingers forward—the ring and pinkie fingers stay closed against the palm.

In High Places is a 22 ft (6.7 m) tall bronze statue of a flying eagle created by Gerald Balciar and dedicated during the university's centennial in 1990.

== Media ==
=== Broadcast ===
KNTU (88.1 FM), licensed and owned by the university and operated by students, has, for fifty-seven years, broadcast to the North Texas region. Jazz has always been a feature of the station; but in 1981, it became the predominant format. KNTU began broadcasting in stereo in 1986 and, on March 22, 1988, increased its broadcasting power from 6,700 watts to 100,000, extending its reach to about a 60-mile radius from its tower located on the Denton campus. KNTU is part of the Mean Green Radio Network, which reaches 10 million listeners. Under the guidance of then-faculty member Bill Mercer (1926–2025), several sports broadcasters and radio personalities have emerged from North Texas, including Dave Barnett formerly of ESPN; George Dunham; Craig Miller; Mark Followill, TV play-by-play voice for the Dallas Mavericks since 2005; Craig Way, current play-by-play announcer for the Longhorn Network; and Emma Tiedemann (not a UNT alumna, but Mercer's granddaughter and current play-by-play voice of the Portland Sea Dogs in Maine).

NTTV, UNT's 24-hour cable television station, features student-produced and student-centric programming.

=== Student publications ===
North Texas Review is an annual publication of the English Department. It is produced by UNT students and exclusively features works—art, poetry, fiction, non-fiction—by UNT students.

Student yearbooks through the years have included Cotton-tail (1906), Yucca (1907–1974), Wings (1977–1980), and Aerie (1982–2007). Aerie ceased publication after the 2007 edition, following a trend of the digital age cited by The Economist in 2008.

North Texas is the home of American Political Science Review as of July 2012. The journal moves among national universities every four to six years. UNT will be the first university in the South or Southwest to house the publication.

The North Texas Daily is the official university daily newspaper, staffed by students. Print issues are published Tuesday through Friday during the fall and spring semesters, and weekly during the summer. The paper was founded in 1916 as The Campus Chat and adopted its current name in 1971.

== Athletics ==
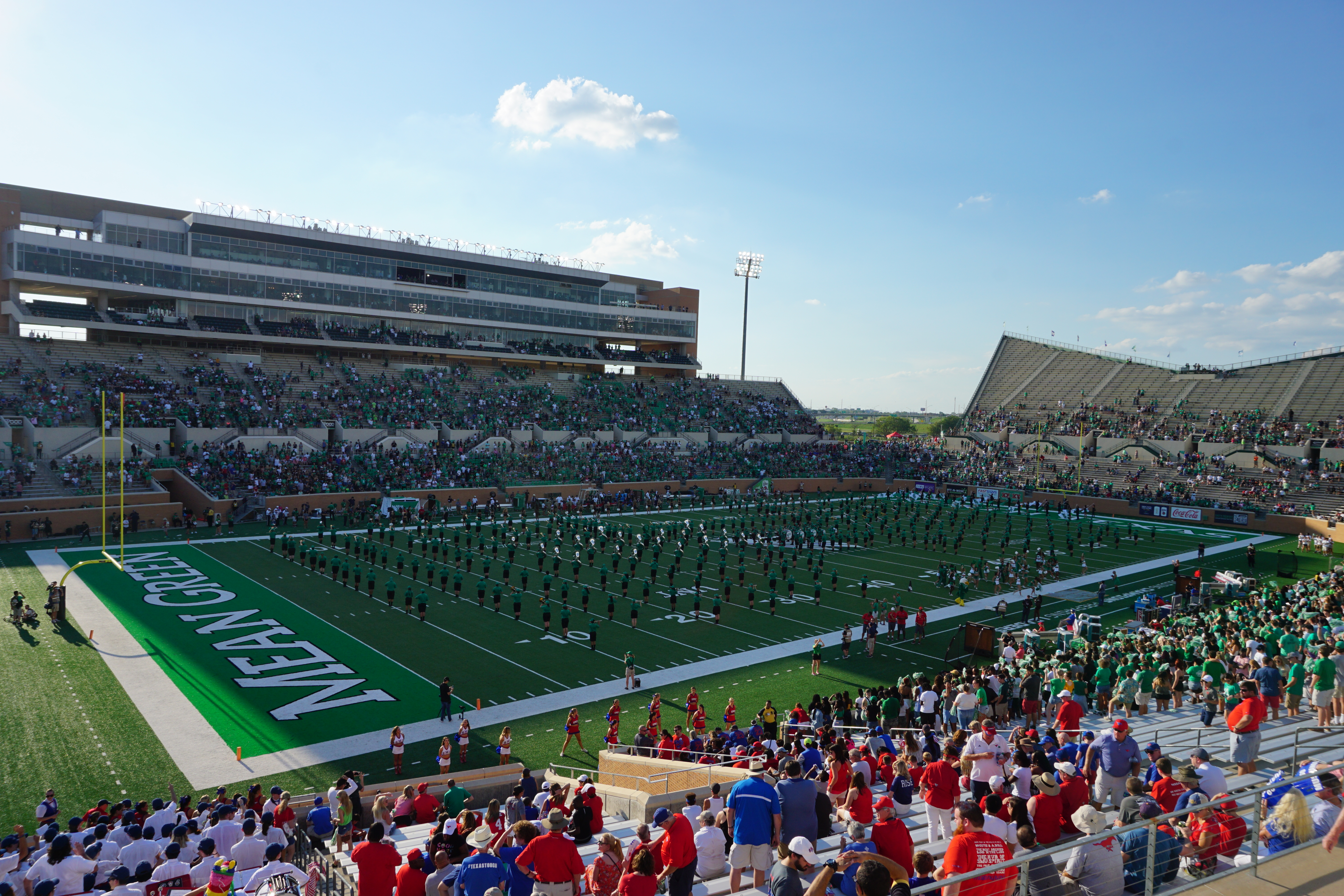
DATCU Stadium

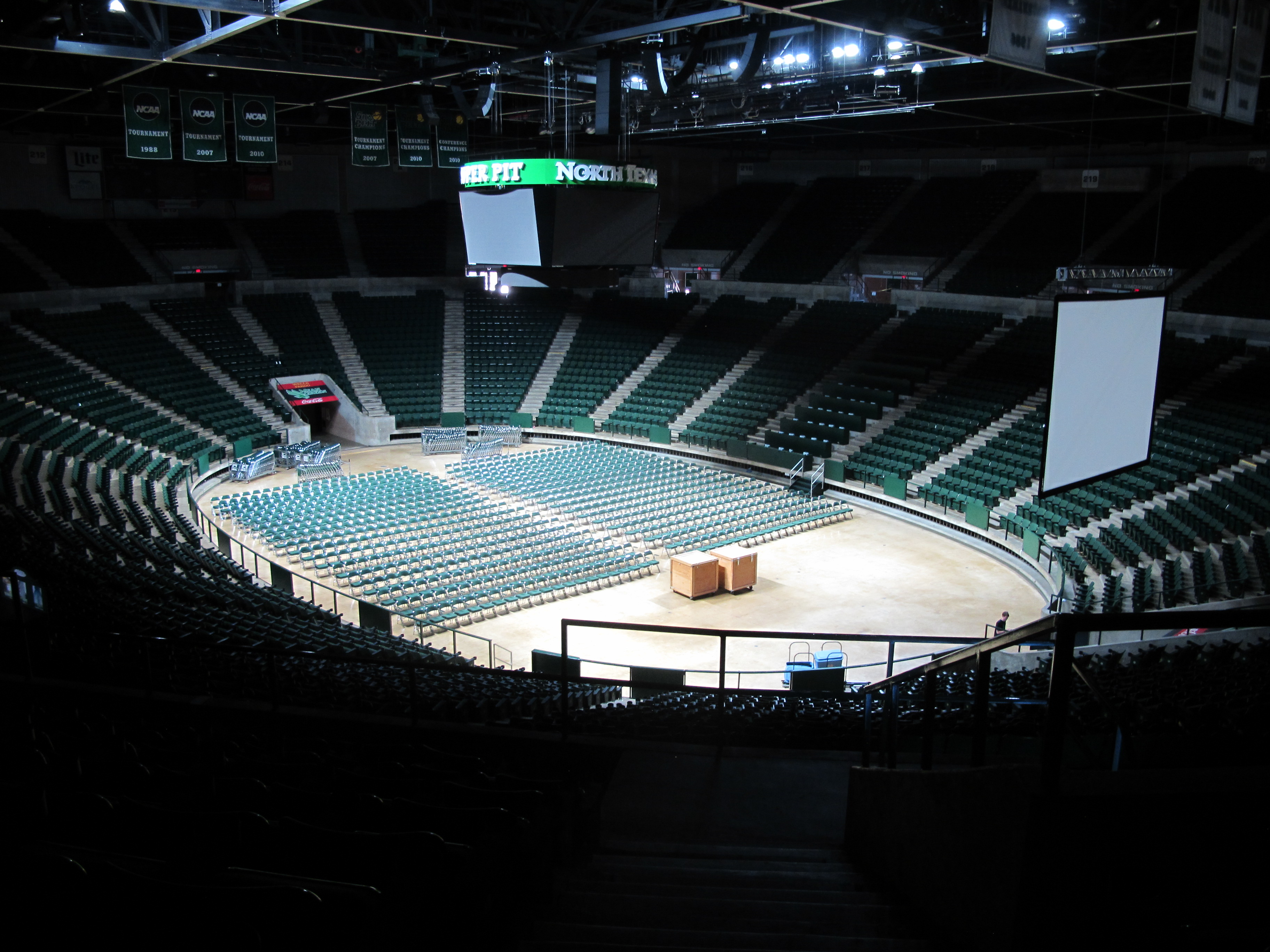
Interior of the UNT Coliseum, nicknamed "The Super Pit"

As of 2012, North Texas sponsored fifteen athletic teams that compete at the intercollegiate level of NCAA Division I—for men: football; for men and women: basketball, track & field, cross country, and golf; for women only: diving, soccer, softball, swimming, tennis, and volleyball. North Texas was a member of Conference USA until it moved to the American Conference in 2023. As of April 2021, the Mean Green have won 142 conference championships, including 50 since 2000.

=== Football ===
In its 113–year history of intercollegiate athletics, the North Texas football team has won 24 conference championships, with the last four occurring from 2001 to 2004 in the Sun Belt Conference. As of 2014, the team has appeared in thirteen bowl games, winning three including the 1946 Optimist Bowl, the 2002 New Orleans Bowl and the 2014 Heart of Dallas Bowl. From 1952 to 2010, home football games were played at Fouts Field. In 2011, UNT began playing in newly constructed DATCU Stadium.

=== Men's basketball ===
The North Texas men's basketball team won the NIT in 2023, following Conference USA titles in 2022 (West Division), 2021 (tournament), and 2020 (regular season). Earlier, the team won the Sun Belt Conference Tournament in 2010 and 2007, earning NCAA Tournament bids in both seasons. The 2006–07 campaign began a four-year run of 20-plus wins. The 2026–2027 season marks the fifty-fourth season that the UNT Coliseum has served as the home for men's basketball.

== Sustainability ==
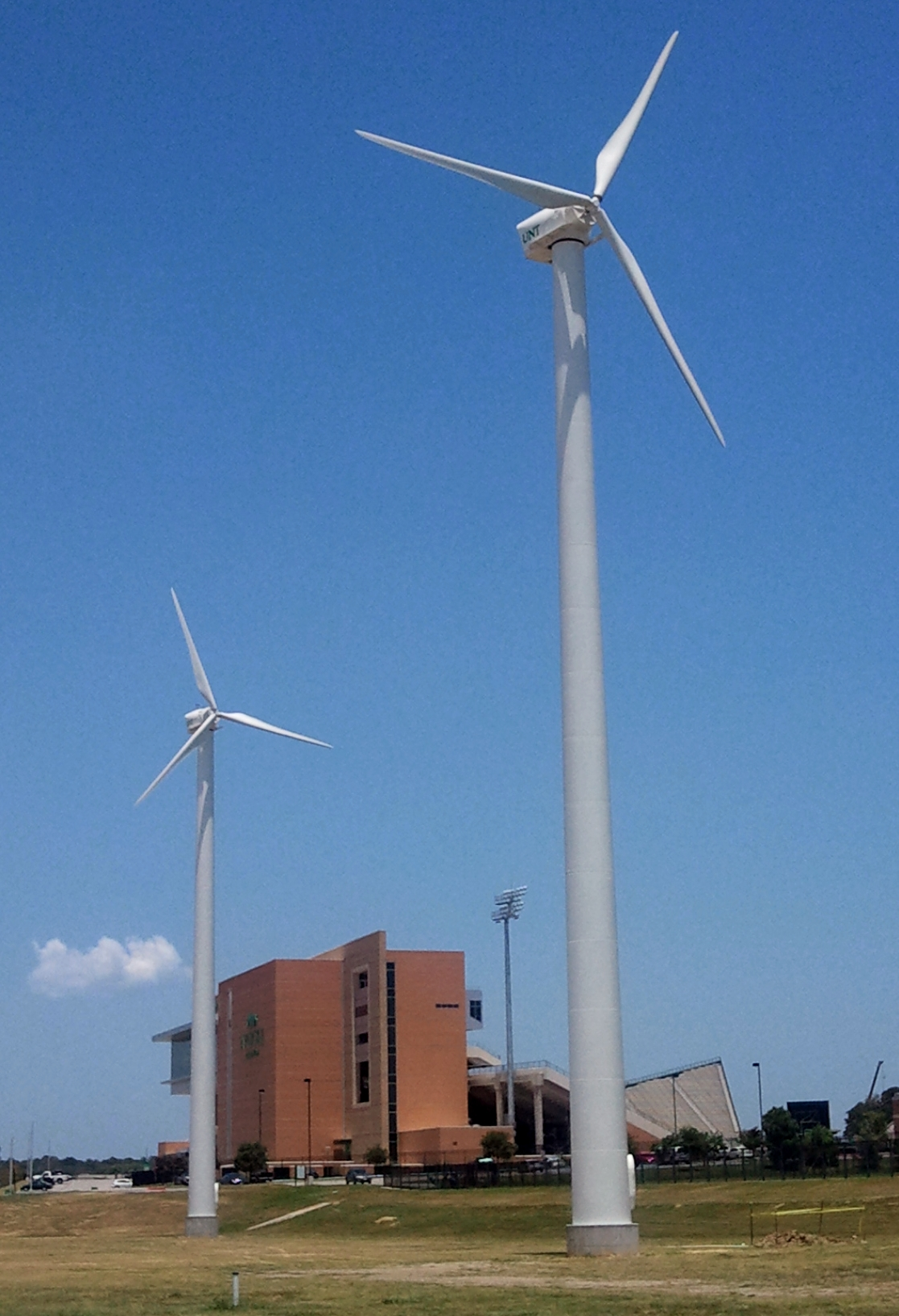
Wind turbines near DATCU Stadium

In 2008, the university became the first large public university in Texas to sign the "American College and University President's Climate Commitment" (ACUPCC). As of September 2012, twenty-four of the 658 signatory institutions of higher learning were from Texas. Of those twenty-four, five were full undergraduate-graduate institutions (2 private, 3 public). Of those five, UNT was the largest. The objectives include achieving carbon neutrality by 2040 and ensuring that all new university buildings and facilities meet a minimum Leadership in Energy and Environmental Design (LEED) Silver rating by the U.S. Green Building Council. The university continued to promote sustainability in 2017 when it purchased a year worth of renewable energy credits, to allow the University of North Texas to be powered by renewable energy.

The Life Science Complex, built in 2011, became UNT's first LEED certified structure, earning a Gold rating. The Complex is a state-of-the-art research facility that houses the university's biochemistry, molecular biology, developmental physiology, genetics and plant sciences programs. The building features four climate-controlled rooftop greenhouses and one of the country's most sophisticated aquatics laboratories with more than 2,500 tanks. Also in 2011, DATCU Stadium, the fifteen-year-old football stadium, became the first newly built sports stadium in the nation to earn a Platinum LEED certification, the highest of four certifications. The facility features wind turbines, eco-friendly building materials, and native landscape architecture.

The following year, The Princeton Review's Guide to 322 Green Colleges, 2012 Edition, listed UNT for the second consecutive year, citing its top 17-percent ranking among green-compliant universities nationwide under ACUPCC. The article stated that forty percent of the energy on campus is derived from renewable sources, and 43 percent of the buildings have undergone energy retrofits. The campus has posted strong numbers in recycling: since 2009, the university has recycled nearly 1,000 tons of waste materials. UNT offers graduate degrees in Environmental Science and Public Administration and Management.

== Notable people ==
=== Alumni ===
As of 2020, the University of North Texas had approximately 448,000 living alumni. More than 304,000 reside in the Dallas–Fort Worth Metroplex.

== See also ==
- American Literary Review is a national magazine of poetry, fiction, and nonfiction by writers at all stages in their careers. It was founded in 1990. The Review is largely student run, with faculty editorial oversight. In the fall of 2013, the Review become exclusively an online digital publication. ISSN 1051-5062
- Environmental Ethics is a peer-reviewed academic journal covering the study of philosophical aspects of environmental problems. It was established in 1979.
- University of North Texas Press, founded in 1987, is a relatively young albeit prolific book publisher with more than 300 titles in print (as of 2012).

== Bibliography ==
=== Primary references ===
- "Annual Comprehensive Financial Report & Independent Auditor's Report" – "For the Year Ended August 31, 2025" (PDF) (University of North Texas System). December 11, 2025. Archived from the original (PDF) on January 1, 2026.
- ERCA: "Net-Centric and Cloud Software and Systems (N-CSS)". Engineering Research Center Association.
- NSF: "Industry-University Cooperative Research Centers (IUCRC) Program" (archive via Wayback Machine). National Science Foundation. Archived from the original on April 3, 2025.
- Purdue: "IUCRC Net-Centric and Cloud Software and Systems Center Brochure" (PDF) (archive url via Wayback Machine). Purdue University Department of Computer Science. Archived from the original (PDF) on July 27, 2024.
- Texas Statutes (2024). Tɪᴛʟᴇ 3: "Higher Education". Sᴜʙᴛɪᴛʟᴇ B: "State Coordination of Higher Education". Cʜᴀᴘᴛᴇʀ 62: "Constitutional and Statutory Funds to Support Institutions of Higher Education". Suʙᴄʜᴀᴘᴛᴇʀ G: "Texas University Fund" Sᴇᴄᴛɪoɴ 143: "Administration and Investment of Fund" (TEC § 62.143; 2024).
Noᴛᴇ: § 62.143 governs the administration and investment of the Texas University Fund outside the state treasury by the comptroller and trust company in accordance with the Texas Constitution – Aʀᴛɪᴄʟᴇ VII: "Education". Sᴇᴄᴛɪoɴ 20: "Texas University Fund".
- "Traditions".
1. "Traditions" (archived ed.) (archived from the original July 14, 2011). 2011. Archived from the original on July 14, 2011.
2. "Symbols".
  1. "Curfew and Spirit Bell".
3. "Traditions of Spirit".
  1. "Homecoming Bonfire".
- "TWU, UNT to Offer Joint Master of Social Work Degree Program". Denton: TWU News, Texas Woman's University. October 30, 2018. Archived from the original on November 24, 2018 – via Wayback Machine.
- UNT News. University Brand Strategy and Communications.
1. "School of Visual Arts Becomes College of Visual Arts and Design". August 9, 2007. Archived from the original on July 1, 2015 – via Wayback Machine.
2. "UNT College of Business, Department of Accounting Reaccredited". February 18, 2009. Archived from the original on July 1, 2015 – via Wayback Machine.
3. "UNT Opens Design Research Center in Dallas". January 31, 2011. Archived from the original on January 9, 2015 – via Wayback Machine.
4. Smatresk, Neal (December 12, 2016). "SACSCOC Approves UNT's Reaccreditation". Archived from the original on June 27, 2018 – via Wayback Machine.
5. "UNT Mean Green Fund Enables Campus to Have 100 Percent Renewable Energy". March 23, 2017. Archived from the original on March 25, 2017 – via Wayback Machine.
6. "Innovative, New Partnership Leads University of North Texas to build Frisco Campus". May 1, 2018. Archived from the original on November 11, 2020 – via Wayback Machine.
7. "Designated a Hispanic-Serving Institution, UNT Can Amplify Resources for Growing and Better Serving Hispanic Student Population". May 15, 2020. Archived from the original on October 22, 2020 – via Wayback Machine.
8. "UNT Enrollment Hits an All-Time High". September 10, 2020. Archived from the original on September 24, 2020 – via Wayback Machine.
9. "It's a 3-Peat: UNT Grows Again, Enrolls 42,372 to Defy National Trend". September 10, 2021. Archived from the original on September 22, 2021 – via Wayback Machine.
10. "UNT Launches a New Independent Master of Social Work Degree to Meet Rising Demand in the Profession". October 9, 2024.
- UNT Websites.
1. "Our Story: History of UNT". 2023. Archived from the original on March 3, 2024.
2. UNT: "All About UNT" →"Athletic Impact" → "142". May 2025.
3. "Fact Books" (2000–01 to 2022–03). "Fact Sheets" (2012–13 to 2024–25). Data Analytics and Institutional Research.
  1. "Student Place of Residence" (PDF). Enrollment Statistics. Fall 2021. p. 33: Exhibit B–18.
  2. "Fall 2024–25 Fact Sheet" (PDF). UNT Office of Data, Analytics, and Institutional Research.
4. "Pohl Recreation Center". Archived from the original on July 3, 2019.
5. UNT: "Center for Fraternity and Sorority Life (CFSL)" (archive url via Wayback Machine). Archived from the original on April 3, 2025.
6. "North Texas Television". Archived from the original on February 5, 2012.
7. North Texas Review (PDF) (1991–). Department of English. 2010. Archived from the original on November 19, 2012.
8. "Faculty and Staff".
9. "Housing". Archived from the original on July 1, 2015.
10. Office of the Provost: "Minority Serving Institution (MSI) Status". 2025.
11. Division of Student Affairs: "Student Activities Center" → "Spirit Groups" → "Scrappy" (archive url via Wayback Machine). Archived from the original on April 14, 2024.
12. "Academics at UNT".
13. "Colleges and Schools". Archived from the original on October 4, 2020.
  1. TAMS – Texas Academy of Mathematics and Science. Archived from the original on September 19, 2020.
  2. College of Liberal Arts & Social Sciences.
  3. College of Science (home page) (archive url via Wayback Machine). Archived from the original on April 4, 2025.
    1. UNT Ion Beam Laboratory (IBL) (archive url via Wayback Machine). University of North Texas Department of Physics. Archived from the original on April 18, 2025.
    2. UNT: "Water Research Field Station and Artificial Stream Facility" (archive url via Wayback Machine). Advanced Environmental Research Institute. Archived from the original on April 18, 2025.
    3. UNT: "Research Facilities" (archive url via Wayback Machine). Department of Biological Sciences. Archived from the original on March 21, 2025.
14. "G. Brint Ryan College of Business" (home page) (archive url via Wayback Machine). Archived from the original on May 1, 2025.
  1. UNT: College of Business, "Outcomes." Fall 2008 – Fall 2016 (archive url via Wayback Machine). May 23, 2017. Archived from the original on November 11, 2020.
  2. UNT: College of Business, "Outcomes." Fall 2018 – Fall 2022 (archive url via Wayback Machine). Archived from the original on December 13, 2024.
15. UNT: COE, "College of Education" (home page) (archive url via Wayback Machine). Archived from the original on April 1, 2025.
16. UNT: "College of Engineering" (home page).
17. UNT: Engineering, "Academic Programs" (archive url via Wayback Machine). Archived from the original on April 6, 2025.
18. UNT: Mechanical Engineering, "History of the Department" (archive url via Wayback Machine). Archived from the original on February 18, 2025.
19. UNT: Department of Computer Science & Engineering, "Undergraduate Academic Certificates" (archive url via Wayback Machine). Archived from the original on March 16, 2025.
20. "College of Merchandising, Hospitality and Tourism" (archive url via Wayback Machine). Archived from the original on April 10, 2025.
  1. CMHT: "Event Design and Experience Management" (archive url via Wayback Machine). Archived from the original on November 10, 2024.
  2. CMHT: "International Sustainable Tourism (M.S.)" (archive url via Wayback Machine). Archived from the original on November 10, 2024.
  3. CMHT: "Minors" (PDF).
  4. CMHT: "Career Expo".
21. College of Health and Public Service (archive url via Wayback Machine). Archived from the original on April 11, 2025.
  1. UNT: HPS, "Departments".
  2. UNT Catalog: "Department of Emergency Management and Disaster Science".
22. IELI: "Intensive English Language Institute" (archive url via Wayback Machine). Archived from the original on April 12, 2025.

=== Secondary references ===
- "AAC Commissioner Mike Aresco Says 6 New Schools Joining in July 2023, When 3 Leave for Big 12". ESPN. Associated Press. June 15, 2022. Archived from the original on July 12, 2022.
- Breeding-Gonzales, Lucinda (November 7, 2023). "UNT set to gain millions in funding as Texans give thumbs-up to Proposition 5". Denton Record-Chronicle. Archived from the original on April 10, 2025.
- Clines, Charles (Keith) (August 30, 1967). "Which Shade of Green Are Eagles Colored". Denton Record-Chronicle. Vol. 65, no. 24. p. 13 – via Newspapers.com.
- Cochran, Mike (September 1, 1968). "Mean Green Same as Nickname". The Abilene Reporter-News. Vol. 88, no. 77 (Sunday 1st ed.). p. 2 (section D) – via The Portal to Texas History. LCCN sn79-7803; ISSN 0199-3267; OCLC 3967993 (all editions).
- Cohn, Seth (August 23, 2011). "Opening Day at UNT's Vegan Cafeteria: Greens Aren't Mean". Dallas Observer.
- "College Adds Four Degrees to Program". Dallas Morning News. October 22, 1970. p. A8.
- Cross, Riley (May 22, 1949). "Big Growth Seen for NTSC". Dallas Morning News. p. 5.
- "The Death of Yearbooks: Valete". The Economist. July 3, 2008. Archived from the original on February 20, 2012.
- DeLassus, David; Noel, Tex. "North Texas Composite Championship Listing". College Football Data Warehouse. Archived from the original on September 30, 2007.
- "Doctor Degrees, Fast Growing Campus Marked NT Development". Denton Record-Chronicle. Vol. 49, no. 6. August 19, 1951. p. 3 – via Newspapers.com.
- "Eagles Are 19-Point Choice". Denton Record-Chronicle. Vol. 65, no. 43. September 21, 1967. p. 10 – via Newspapers.com.
- Edwards, Robert "Bob" John (April 17, 1949). "Round About Town". Denton Record-Chronicle. Vol. 47, no. 209. p. 1.
- "Fight, North Texas". Catalog of Copyright Entries, Part 3: Musical Compositions. Vol. 34. U.S. Government Printing Office. 1939. p. 1446.
- "Fight, North Texas". Catalog of Copyright Entries, Part 5: Music. Vol. 21. U.S. Government Printing Office. 1967. p. 836.
- Forbes (2025). "America's Top Colleges" (online ed.). (see "America's Top Colleges").
- "4 Major Groups Cheer the Eagles to Victory". Denton Record-Chronicle. Vol. 74, no. 317. August 7, 1977. p. I12 – via Newspapers.com.
- Fowler, Scott (February 16, 1992). "'Hey Kid! Catch!' Three Words — and 24 Cokes — to TV Stardom". Miami Herald. Vol. 82, no. 78. p. 6D – via Newspapers.com.
- Freehill, Lynn (November–December 2008). "Cactus Clings to Life". The Alcalde. Vol. 97, no. 2. p. 26. ISSN 1535-993X – via Google Books.
- HEADS Data Special Report, 2010-11: Art & Design (requires "Advanced Search;" $20 fee per year). National Association of Schools of Art and Design. 2022.^{[data is from 2011]}
- HEADS Data Special Report, 2010–11: Music (requires "Advanced Search;" $20 fee per year). National Association of Schools of Music. 2011.^{[data is from 2011]}
- Henry, Warren (February 24, 2010). "North Texas, University of". Grove Music Online. OCLC 219650052
- Henry, Warren (2013). "North Texas, University of". The Grove Dictionary of American Music. Vol. 6 (2nd ed.). Oxford University Press. p. 151. ISBN 978-0-1953-1428-1 – via Internet Archive. LCCN 2012-2055 OCLC 774021205
- Herra, Dana (September 7, 2009). "Francis Edwin Stroup Turns 100". Daily Chronicle. DeKalb, Illinois – via Blogspot.
- Hopkins, Joyce (December 8, 1974). "Board Okays NT, TCOM Final Merger". Denton Record-Chronicle. Vol. 71, no. 422. pp. 1-2 (sect. A) – via Newspapers.com.
- Jones, Brent M. (Spring 2011). "The Texas Academy of Mathematics and Science: A 20-Year Perspective". Journal for the Education of the Gifted. 34 (3): 513–543, 545. doi:10.1177/016235321103400307. ISSN 0162-3532.
- King, Jill (Fall 2008). "Composer of 'Fight, North Texas' Crafts a Life Full of Song". The North Texan Online. 'Living Knows No Season'. Archived from the original on January 16, 2013.
- "KNTU-FM Reaches Air: NT Radio Becomes Reality". Denton Record-Chronicle. Vol. 67, no. 81. November 4, 1969. p. 1 – via Newspapers.com.
- McGee, Kate (November 8, 2021). "University of North Texas Names Health School President Michael Williams Sole Finalist for System Chancellor". The Texas Tribune. Archived from the original on July 6, 2022.
- "Mean Green Machine Gets a 'Green' Makeover". The North Texan. Archived from the original on October 25, 2014.
- "MSU Chosen for College Association". The Commercial Appeal. Vol. 153, no. 293 (Final ed.). Memphis. October 19, 1992. p. 16 – via Newspapers.com. LCCN sn90-39717; OCLC 6671879 (all editions).
- Newell, Charldean (Summer 2012). "Early Honors". The North Texan. Dear North Texas. Vol. 62, no. 2. p. 6. ISSN 0468-6659 – via ISSUU.
- "New Graduate Degrees Approved for NTSU". Dallas Morning News. March 14, 1970. p. C5.
- "NIU Mourns Passing of Francis Stroup". NIU Today. December 1, 2010. Archived from the original on December 20, 2011.
- North Texan (The) (quarterly) (alumni magazine). ISSN 0468-6659; OCLC 1175609406 (all editions).
1. "Looking Back – And Moving Forward". University of North Texas. September 25, 2020. Archived from the original on November 17, 2020.
- "North Texas College Plans Huge Bonfire". Dallas Morning News. November 14, 1950. p. I8.
- North Texas Daily. 1970–current. Preceded by: The Campus Chat → Monthly from November 1, 1916, to 1940; twice weekly from 1940 to 1970. LCCN sn88-83234; OCLC 14629444 (all editions); 1053512355, 57370676, 17435854.
1. "Journalism Offers Two New Plans". Vol. 54, no. 115. August 5, 1971. p. 2 – via Portal to Texas History.
2. Warren, Robert (April 6, 2017). "UNT Will Be 100 Percent Powered by Renewable Energy for One Year". Vol. 109, no. 11 (1st ed.). p. 2 – via Portal to Texas History.
- North Texas Daily and Campus Chat Newspaper Collection; 1916–2019 → "About the Collection". Description online via Portal to Texas History. University of North Texas Libraries. Retrieved April 26, 2025. OCLC 1053512355.
- "NTSC Song Author Can't Read Music". Denton Record-Chronicle. Vol. 47, no. 271. June 25, 1950. p. 1 (Section 2) – via Portal to Texas History.
- NSF: "Net-Centric and Cloud Software and Systems" (archive via Wayback Machine). National Science Foundation. Archived from the original on March 5, 2025.
- "NTSU Schedules Exhibition of Fashion Group Costumes". Dallas Morning News. September 2, 1973. p. E2.
- ORAU. Oak Ridge Associated Universities. Oak Ridge, Tennessee. Retrieved April 24, 2025.
1. "Consortium Member Directory" → "Texas" → "University of North Texas".
- Pepitone, Julianne. "Serving the Whole Student With Whole Foods" – "From Vegan Dining to Fueling up for the Big Game, UNT Covers All Its Bases". FoodService Director. Food Service Operation of the Month. EBSCOhost 136431832 (print ed.; Business Source Premier database); LCCN 91-660047; ISSN 1745-3046 (print ed.), ISSN 0897-7208 (online ed.); OCLC 17605123 (all editions).
1. Online ed.. May 12, 2019.
2. Print ed.. Vol. 32, no. 5. May 2019. pp. 60–61 – via QG Digital Publishing of QG Media of Information Security Media Group.
- "Photograph of Charles Langford". Portal to Texas History. Archived from the original on July 1, 2015.
- Piellucci, Mike (March 31, 2021). "UNT Just Won Its Biggest Sports Championship in 71 Years – Mean Green Men's Basketball Won the National Invitation Tournament Last Night in Las Vegas". D Magazine (archive url via Wayback Machine) (blog ed.). Archived from the original on April 1, 2023.
- "Political Science Journal". The North Texan. UNT Today. Vol. 61, no. 4. Winter 2011. p. 13. ISSN 0468-6659 – via ISSUU.
- The Princeton Review's Guide to 322 Green Colleges. New York: The Princeton Review, Inc., Philadelphia and Washington, D.C.: Center For Green Schools at the U.S. Green Building Council. OCLC 794856382 (all editions).
1. Seltzer, Jeremy. 2012 ed (PDF). p. 164. Archived (PDF) from the original on October 8, 2012.
2. O'Toole, Kristen (ed.). 2013 ed (PDF). p. 154 – via Eastern Illinois University.
- Quacquarelli Symonds (2025). "QS World University Rankings" (archive url via Wayback Machine) (online ed.). Archived from the original on April 30, 2025.
- Rogers, James Lloyd Jr. (2002). The Story of North Texas: From Texas Normal College, 1890, to the University of North Texas System, 2001. University of North Texas Press. Retrieved April 17, 2023. LCCN 2002-561; ISBN 1-5744-1128-4, 9-781-5744-1128-7.
1. Via Internet Archive. 2002. ISBN 978-1-57441-128-7.
2. Via Google Books (preview only).
- SACSCOC. "University of North Texas". Institution ID: 0011N00001h9EA2QAM. Southern Association of Colleges and Schools, Commission on Colleges.
- Sadie, ed. (2001). "Libraries, §2(ii): North America: United States of America". The New Grove Dictionary of Music and Musicians. Vol. 28 (2nd ed.). Grove. p. 306. ISBN 1-56159-239-0 – via Internet Archive.
- Sayler, Michael F[rank] (January–March 2015). "Texas Academy of Mathematics and Science: 25 Years of Early College STEM Opportunities". Roeper Review. 37 (1). Taylor & Francis: 29–38. doi:10.1080/02783193.2015.975773. doi:10.1080/02783193.2015.975773 (article); EBSCOhost 100298903 (article); ISSN 0278-3193 (journal); OCLC 10310205333 (article).
- Schott, Kate. "Stroup, 101, Wrote NIU Fight Song". Daily Chronicle. Vol. 132, no. 231. DeKalb, Illinois. p. 3 – via Newspapers.com.
- Scott, Philip Allen (1973). Chapter 2: "In the Beginning": Jazz Educated, Man; A Sound Foundation. Washington, D.C.: American International Publishers. pp. 17–26. LCCN 73-159620; OCLC 624548 (all editions).
- SEJ: "Mayborn Literary Nonfiction Conference". Washington, D.C.: Society of Environmental Journalists. October 2022. "The Mayborn Conference, now in its 18th year, will deliver all the insights into great narrative storytelling ..."
- Smither, Howard E. (2001). "Universities, §III, 4: After 1945: The USA". In Sadie, Stanley (ed.). The New Grove Dictionary of Music and Musicians. Vol. 26 (2nd ed.). Grove. p. 145. ISBN 1-56159--239-0 – via Internet Archive.
- Studwell, William Emmett; Schueneman, Bruce Robert (2013) [2001]. "Fight, North Texas". College Fight Songs II: A Supplementary Anthology. Routledge. p. 29. Retrieved April 17, 2025.
1. ISBN 978-0-7890-0920-3, 0-7890-0920-X (2001 ed.).
2. ISBN 978-1-1363-8831-6, 1-1363-8831-1 (2013 ed.).
3. ISBN 978-1-1363-8824-8, 1-1363-8824-9 (2013 ed.)
4. ISBN 978-0-2030-4810-8, 0-2030-4810-5 (2013 ed.)
5. OCLC 840505402 (all editions).
1. Via Internet Archive (limited preview only) (Harris County Public Library). 2001.
2. Via Google Books (limited preview only).
- Smith, Gloria (1969). "Glory to the Green and White: Alma Mater Song". Bryn Mawr, Pennsylvania: Mowbray Music Publishers, distributed by Theodore Presser Company. OCLC 4418069 (all editions) and 1052922198.
- TEA: "2010–2011 Annual Performance Report." Handout 6b (archive url via Wayback Machine). Texas Education Agency. 2010. Archived from the original on October 27, 2012. ^{[data is from 2011]}
- Texas Legislature. Texas Education Code, Title 3, Subtitle B ("The Excellence in Higher Education Act" of 1985. Added by Acts 1985, 69th Legislature., ch. 225, Sec. 1, eff. June 3, 1985). Chapter 62: "Constitutional and Statutory Funds to Support Institutions of Higher Education". Texas Statutes.
- "Tier One". The North Texan. UNT Today. Vol. 66, no. 1. Spring 2016. p. 6. ISSN 0468-6659 – via ISSUU.
- "University of North Texas". BigFuture. College Board. 2024. Archived from the original on January 26, 2025.
- "University of North Texas". The Carnegie Classification of Institutions of Higher Education. 2013–2014. Archived from the original on September 13, 2018.
- "University of North Texas". The Carnegie Classification of Institutions of Higher Education. 2026.
- University of North Texas. Shanghai Ranking (Report).
- "UNT Briefs". Denton Record-Chronicle. February 15, 2012. Archived from the original on April 27, 2012.
- "UNT Yearbooks" (collection blog). Portal to Texas History. University of North Texas Libraries. Archived from the original on July 1, 2015.
- U.S. News & World Report. "Best ..." (published annually in mid-September; the 2025 edition was published September 18, 2024) (online ed.). → See U.S. News & World Report Best Colleges Ranking.
1. "National Universities Rankings". 2025.
  1. "UNT Academics". 2025.
2. "Grad Schools". 2025.
3. "Global Universities". 2025.
4. "Online Programs". 2025.
5. 2012 Rankings: UNT College Summary". 2012. Archived from the original on September 18, 2011.
- Vito, Brett (October 21, 2011). "Stadium garners ultimate ranking". Denton Record-Chronicle. Archived from the original on July 3, 2012.
- Vito, Brett (March 26, 2025) [March 24, 2025]. "Remembering Bill Mercer: Iconic Voice of North Texas Sports and Mentor to Generations of DFW Broadcasters Dies at 99". Denton Record-Chronicle. Archived from the original on March 28, 2025.
- Wall Street Journal, The (September 4, 2024). "2025 Best Colleges in the U.S.". In collaboration with College Pulse (online ed.).
- Washington Monthly (2024). "National Universities" (online ed.). ISSN 0043-0633; OCLC 62173596.
1. "National Universities" (2024 rankings were published August 25, 2024). Vol. 56, nos. 9/10 (print ed.). September–October 2024. pp. 72–88. EBSCOhost 178980063.
- Welding, Lyss (May 21, 2024). Long, Rebecca (ed.). "Largest Colleges and Universities in the U.S." BestColleges.

=== Tertiary references ===
- "Almanac". THECB Report Center. Texas Higher Education Coordinating Board.
- "Brand Identity & Communications Guide". UNT System. p. 9.
- "University of North Texas". College Scorecard. United States Department of Education. OCLC 859162756.
- "UNT AFR Reports". UNT System.
- "UNT Budget Overview". UNT System 2026 Consolidated Operating Budget (PDF) (Report). University of North Texas System. August 14, 2025. pp. 13–19. Archived from the original (PDF) on September 3, 2025.
- UNT System Operations Report FY2025 Q1 (PDF) (Report). University of North Texas System. February 2025. Archived from the original (PDF) on February 20, 2025.
