= Igor Hawryszkiewycz =

American computer scientist

Igor Titus Hawryszkiewycz (born c. 1948) is an American computer scientist, organizational theorist, and Professor at the School of Systems, Management and Leadership of the University of Technology, Sydney, known for his work in the field of database systems, systems analysis, and knowledge management.

== Biography ==
Hawryszkiewycz obtained his PhD in computer science from Massachusetts Institute of Technology in 1973 with the thesis, entitled "Semantics of data base systems." developed within the Project MAC.

Hawryszkiewycz started his academic career as lecturer in information Systems at the University of Canberra in 1975. Since 1986 he is professor at the University of Technology, Sydney and Head of its Department of Information Systems. From 1989 to 1993 he also directed its Key Center of Advanced Computing Sciences.

Hawryszkiewycz's research interest is focussed on "developing design thinking environments to provide business solutions in complex environments by integrating processes, knowledge, and social networking... [and] facilitating agility and evolution of business systems through collaboration."

== Selected publications ==
- I.T. Hawryszkiewycz. Semantics of data base systems. PhD thesis, Massachusetts Institute of Technology, Cambridge (1973)
- Hawryszkiewycz, Igor Titus, and I. T. Hawryszkiewycz. Database analysis and design. Chicago, IL: Science Research Associates, 1984.
- Hawryszkiewycz, Igor T. Introduction to systems analysis and design. Prentice Hall PTR, 1994.
- Hawryszkiewycz, Igor. Knowledge Management: Organizing Knowledge Based Enterprises. Palgrave Macmillan P." (2009)

Articles, a selection

- Hawryszkiewycz, Igor. "A metamodel for modeling collaborative system s." (2005).
