= North Texas Daily =

Newspaper of University of North Texas

- Type: Student newspaper
- School: University of North Texas
- Headquarters: Denton, Texas
- Website: ntdaily.com

North Texas Daily, also known as NT Daily, is the student newspaper of the University of North Texas in Denton, Texas, published daily on the web and every Thursday in print.

The paper focuses on six main categories: News, Arts & Life, Pop culture section The Dose, Sports and Opinion.

The multimedia website for the newspaper is ntdaily.com. It includes audio, video and interactive projects, as well as embedded Tweet, Periscope streams and Snapchat posts. Readers also may post comments on stories. The Web site receives approximately 10,000 hits per day.

The newspaper's daily circulation is approximately 10,000. Paper copies are delivered Thursday to campus buildings, dorms and businesses in Denton.

The University of North Texas' student newspaper began publishing in 1916 under the name Campus Chat. In 1971, the newspaper changed its name to the "North Texas Daily." The newspaper celebrated its 90th anniversary in 2006 and its 100th anniversary in 2016.

The Daily and the Campus Chat, have earned three regional and six National Pacemaker Awards. The newspaper has also earned All-American honors from the Associated Collegiate Press and College Media Advisers more than 85 times. The Daily has also earned awards from the Society of Professional Journalists and the Associated Press Managing Editors as well as on and off-site awards from the Texas Intercollegiate Press Association.

== See also ==
- List of college newspapers
