= Aidong Zhang =

Computer scientist

- Scientific career
- Fields: Computer science
- Workplaces: University of Buffalo; University of Virginia

Aidong Zhang is a computer scientist whose research topics include machine learning and bioinformatics. As of 2025, she is the Thomas M. Linville Professor of Computer Science at the University of Virginia, where she also holds affiliations with the Department of Biomedical Engineering and School of Data Science. She was previously a William Wulf Faculty Fellow.

== Education and career ==
Zhang earned her PhD in 1994 at Purdue University. She joined the department of computer science of the University at Buffalo as an assistant professor in 1994, became full professor in 2002, and was named University at Buffalo Distinguished Professor in 2012 and SUNY Distinguished Professor in 2014. She chaired the department from 2009 to 2015. After taking a leave from the department from 2015 to 2018 to serve as a program director for the National Science Foundation, she moved to the University of Virginia in 2019. She continues to be listed by the University at Buffalo as professor emerita.

Zhang was the founding chair of the ACM Special Interest Group on Bioinformatics, Computational Biology, and Biomedical Informatics, and served as its chair from 2011 to 2015. She was the editor-in-chief of IEEE/ACM Transactions on Computational Biology and Bioinformatics from 2017 to 2021.

== Books ==
Zhang is the author of books including Advanced Analysis of Gene Expression Microarray Data (World Scientific, 2006) and Protein Interaction Networks: Computational Analysis (Cambridge University Press, 2009).

== Recognition ==
Zhang was elected as an IEEE Fellow in 2009 "for contributions to multimedia data indexing". She was named an ACM Fellow in 2017, "for her contributions to bioinformatics and data mining".

In 2023 she was recognized with an ACM Distinguished Service Award for "her impactful leadership and lasting service to the broad communities of bioinformatics, computational biology, and data mining."
