= Peristera Paschou =

Greek-American geneticist and neuroscientist

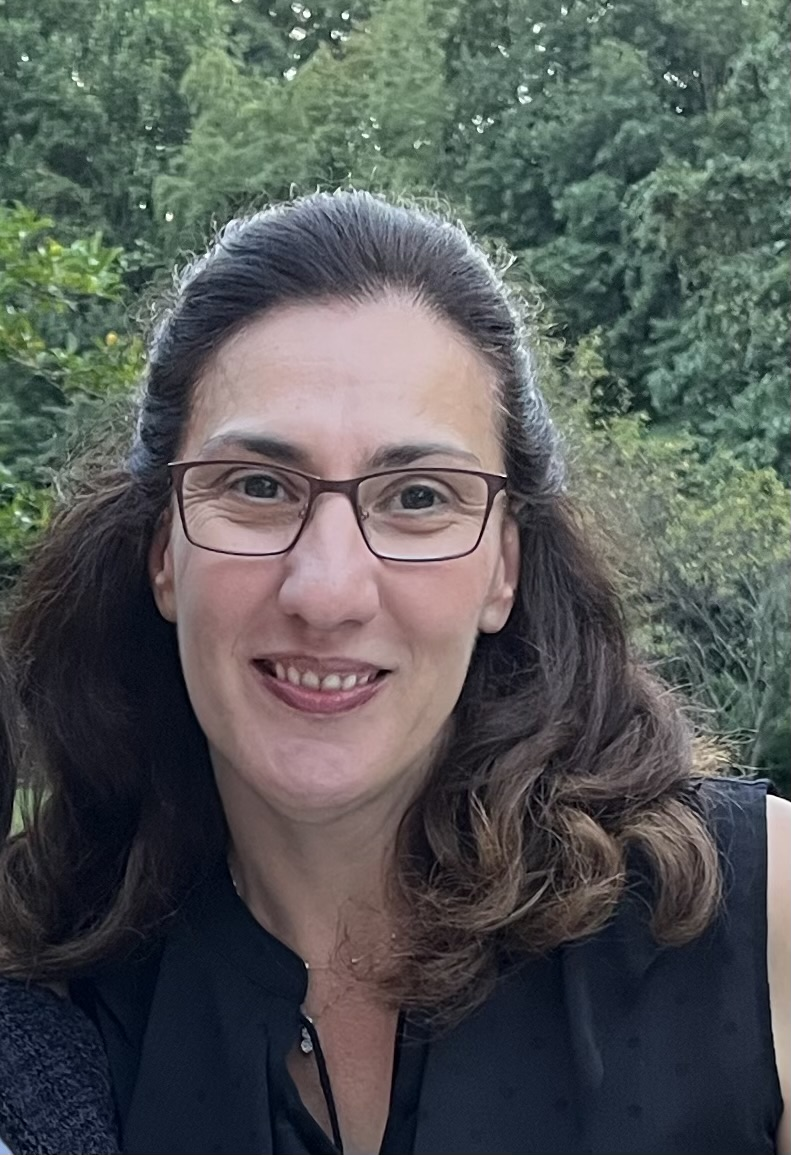
- Paschou in 2022
- Known for: Tourette Syndrome research, ENIGMA Consortium
- Scientific career
- Fields: Genetics, Neuroscience
- Workplaces: Purdue University

Peristera Paschou is a Greek-American geneticist and neuroscientist. She is currently a professor and head of the Department of Biological Sciences at Purdue University. Paschou is recognized for her research in population genetics and the genetic basis of neurodevelopmental and neuropsychiatric disorders.

== Early life and education ==
Paschou earned her Ph.D. from the University of Athens in Greece. During her doctoral studies, she trained at the Wellcome Trust Centre for Human Genetics at the University of Oxford and the Pasteur Institute in Paris. She completed postdoctoral training at Yale University School of Medicine, where she also received certification in Clinical Molecular Genetics from the American Board of Medical Genetics.

== Career ==
Paschou began her academic career at Democritus University of Thrace in Greece, where she served as Lecturer and later associate professor of Population Genetics. She joined Purdue University in 2016 as an Associate Professor and was promoted to full Professor in 2021. From 2019 to 2023, she served as Associate Dean of the College of Science. In 2023, she was appointed interim head of the Department of Biological Sciences, and in 2025, she was named permanent head of the department.

== Research ==
Paschou's research focuses on the genetic architecture of complex neurodevelopmental disorders, including Tourette syndrome, obsessive–compulsive disorder, attention deficit hyperactivity disorder, autism, and neurodegenerative diseases. She has led several international research consortia, including TS-Eurotrain and Emtics, and co-chairs the ENIGMA-Tourette Syndrome Working Group.

Her lab uses genome-wide datasets to study human genetic variation and population movements, particularly in the Mediterranean region. She is a principal investigator on a National Institute of Neurological Disorders and Stroke project involving over 12,000 cases of Tourette Syndrome.

Paschou has also collaborated extensively with her husband, Petros Drineas, a professor and Head of the Department of Computer Science at Purdue University. Their joint research integrates computational biology and population genetics, producing tools such as TeraPCA for analyzing tera-scale genotypes, and contributing to studies on genetic structure in European and Indian populations.

In 2025, Paschou and Drineas co-led a multidisciplinary study on sex-specific genetic risk factors for Alzheimer's disease, identifying key genes such as BIN1 and QRFPR that may contribute to higher prevalence in women.

== Honors and affiliations ==
Paschou was named a Showalter Faculty Scholar and University Faculty Scholar at Purdue University in 2019. She has held visiting positions at University of California, San Francisco, University of California, Los Angeles, and the National Institutes of Health. She has served in leadership roles for the European Society for the Study of Tourette Syndrome and the Greater Indiana Society for Neuroscience.

She is a member of the editorial boards of Journal of Medical Genetics, PLOS One, and Frontiers in Evolutionary and Population Genetics.
