= Denton Record-Chronicle =

Newspaper in Denton, Texas, US

- Type: Daily newspaper
- Format: Broadsheet
- Owners: Independent (1903–99); A.H. Belo (1999–2018); Denton Media Co. (2018-23); KERA (2023–present)
- Editor: Claire Williams
- Founded: 1903; 123 years ago
- Headquarters: 2413 Ft Worth Drive; Denton, Texas 76205; USA
- Circulation: 3,780 (as of 2023)
- Website: dentonrc.com

The Denton Record-Chronicle is a community newspaper and the main source of local news online for residents of the City of Denton, Texas and Denton County. Controlled by Denton Media Company until 2023, it also publishes the quarterly Denton County Magazine.

On August 7, 2023, it was announced that public radio station KERA acquired Denton Record-Chronicle.

== History ==
William C. Edwards, who started his career in journalism as a reporter for the weekly Denton Chronicle in 1886, took ownership of that newspaper and the city’s other weekly, the Denton County Record, and merged them into the Denton Record and Chronicle in 1901.

The newspaper published its first daily edition on Aug. 3, 1903. It dropped “and” from its name in 1915.

Edwards, who served one term in the Texas House of Representatives (1922–24) and ran unsuccessfully for lieutenant governor, was a president of the Texas Press Association. He left Denton for the Hearst newspaper company in 1927 and became editor of the Washington Herald.

His brother Robert became publisher and managing editor in Denton when William left, and the Edwards family owned and operated the Record-Chronicle until 1945, when it sold to Riley Cross, former publisher of the Marshall News Messenger.

Cross led the newspaper during a period of significant growth in Denton, as well as through the integration of North Texas State University, now the University of North Texas. J.C. Matthews, president of the university, credited the peaceful integration of the late 1950s in part to coverage by the Record-Chronicle.

Fred Patterson, who was married to Cross’ daughter Patsy, started working in the newspaper’s ad department in 1958 and became ad manager in 1960. After Cross’ death in 1970, his wife, Vivian, led the Record-Chronicle until she retired in 1986, when Fred and Patsy Patterson took ownership.

The Pattersons devoted their time and resources to supporting the arts and cultural communities in Denton, including leading the committee that raised $2 million to revive the Campus Theatre on Denton’s downtown square and co-founding Denton County’s Historical Park. They sold the newspaper to A.H. Belo Corporation, publishers of The Dallas Morning News, in 1999.

In 2018, the Pattersons’ son Bill purchased the Record-Chronicle back from A.H. Belo. Since then, he has overseen the company’s transformation from a print-minded news organization to a digitally focused news source.

In 2022, Dallas public radio station KERA announced its intention to purchase the Record-Chronicle. The purchase was completed on August 7, 2023.
