= Rajkumar Buyya =

Professor at the University of Melbourne

Academic background
- Thesis: Economic-based Distributed Resource Management and Scheduling for Grid Computing (2002)

Rajkumar Buyya is an Indian born Australian academic. As of 2022, he is distinguished professor and director of the Cloud Computing and Distributed Systems Laboratory at the University of Melbourne.

He was made a Fellow of the Institute of Electrical and Electronics Engineers (IEEE) in 2015 for contributions to cloud computing. He was elected a foreign member of Academia Europaea in 2022.

He published Content Delivery Networks (with Athena I. Vakali and Mukaddim Pathan, Springer, 2008).

In 2017, Buyya won the Scopus Excellence in Innovative Research Award.

In 2021, Buyya was included in a list of 40 researchers regarded as lifetime achievers in their fields published by The Australian. He was named as an ACM Fellow in the 2025 class of fellows for research contributions to cost and energy-efficient resource management and scheduling systems for cloud computing.

.
