= University of North Texas Discovery Park =

Research facility in Denton, Texas

Coordinates: 33.253937°N 97.152901°W

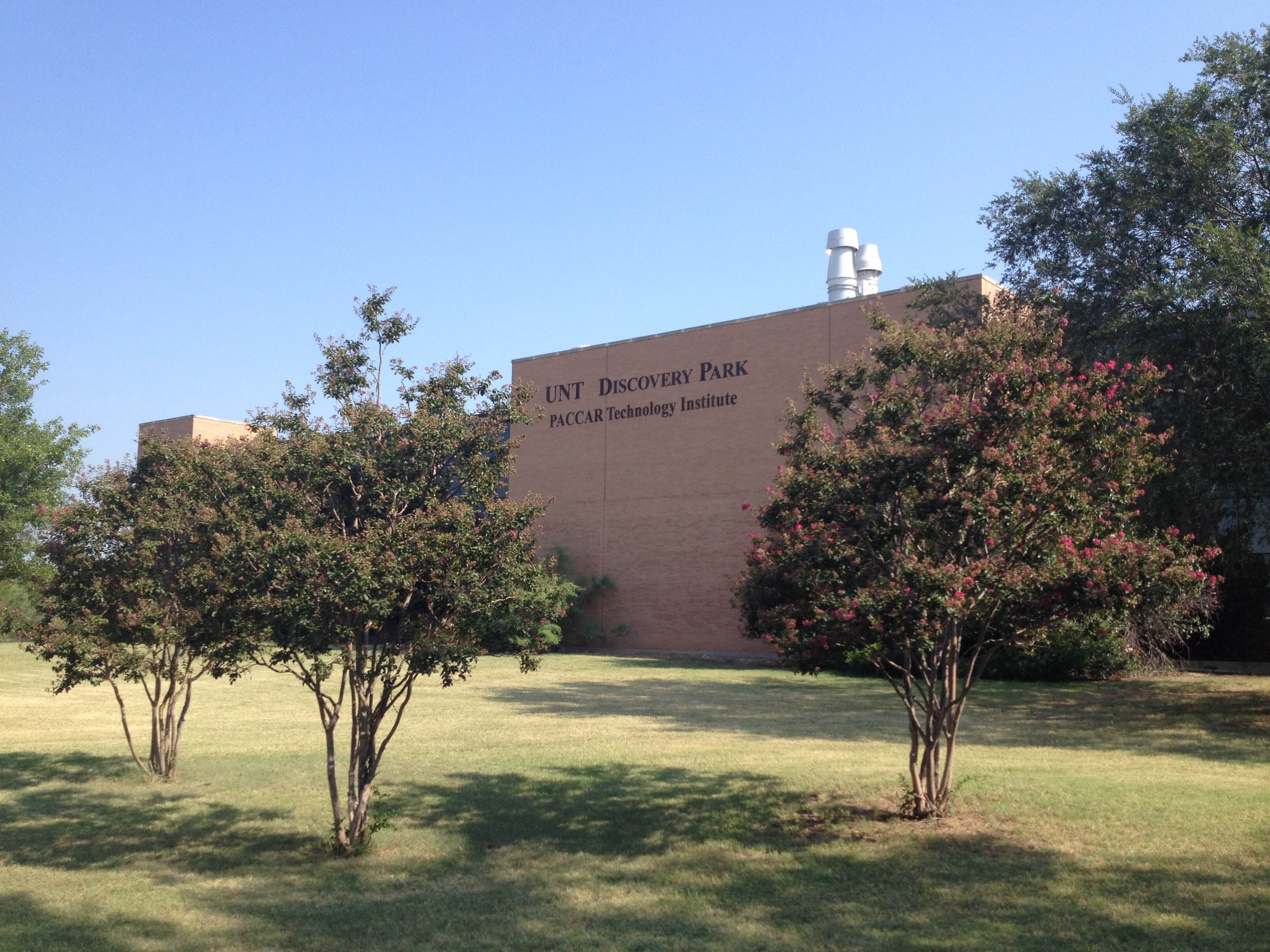
Discovery Park

The University of North Texas Discovery Park Campus, formerly Research Park, is a satellite research facility of the University of North Texas. Discovery Park is located in Denton, Texas, north of the main campus, on U.S. Highway 77. In January 2004, the 550,000-square-foot (51,000 m^{2}) facility, formerly occupied by Texas Instruments, opened to students from the UNT College of Engineering. In 2008, the newly formed College of Information joined the Discovery Park campus. The facility houses offices and labs for the Departments of Biomedical Engineering, Computer Science and Engineering, Electrical Engineering, Materials Science and Engineering, Mechanical Engineering, Information Science, Learning Technologies, and Linguistics. The Center for Technology Development and Transfer (CTDT) began operations from Discovery Park in 2006.

The University of North Texas Discovery Park Library serves the Discovery Park Campus as a satellite branch of the UNT Library system. Cross country running meets are held at the facility.

The Discovery Park Campus is located at 3940 North Elm Street, Denton, TX 76207.
