= Lonnie D. Bentley =

American computer scientist

Lonnie D. Bentley (born 1957) is an American computer scientist, and Professor and former Department Head of Computer and Information Technology at Purdue University, known with Kevin C. Dittman and Jeffrey L. Whitten as co-author of the textbook Systems Analysis and Design Methods, which is now in its 7th edition.

== Life and work ==
Born in 1957, Bentley attended the Mountain Home High School in Arkansas. He studied at the Arkansas State University, where in 1979 he received his B.S. in Business Data Processing, and in 1981 his M.S. in Information Systems.

Bentley has taught courses such as Systems Analysis and Design Methods; Systems Analysis (using structured analysis-based methods); Systems Analysis (using information engineering-based methods); Systems Design (using RAD design-based methods); Systems Design (using structured design-based methods); Enterprise Resource Planning and Integration; Business Process Redesign.

Aside from systems analysis and design, Bentley also focuses on enterprise applications, business process redesign, computer-aided software engineering (CASE), rapid application development (RAD), and graphical user interface (GUI) design.

Along with his contributions to higher education, Lonnie is also a founder of Broadband Antenna Tracking Systems (BATS).

== Honors and awards ==
- 1985 - Best Teacher Award, Department of Computer Technology
- 1995 - Outstanding Tenured Faculty Award, School of Technology
- 1998 - $1,000 OOPSLA Educators Scholarship
- 1998 - $500 Dow Corning Faculty Scholarship
- 2006 - Arkansas State University Distinguished Alumnus

== Selected publications ==
- Bentley, Lonnie D., Kevin C. Dittman, and Jeffrey L. Whitten. Systems analysis and design methods. (1986, 1997, 2004).
- Whitten, Jeffrey L., and Lonnie D. Bentley. Using Excelerator for systems analysis and design. (1987).
- Bentley, Lonnie D., and Jeffrey L. Whitten. Systems analysis and design for the global enterprise. McGraw-Hill Irwin, 2007.
- Whitten, Jeffrey L., and Lonnie D. Bentley. Introduction to systems analysis and design. McGraw Hill Irwin, 2008.
