= Ahmed Sameh =

American computer scientist

Ahmed Hamdy Mohamed Sameh
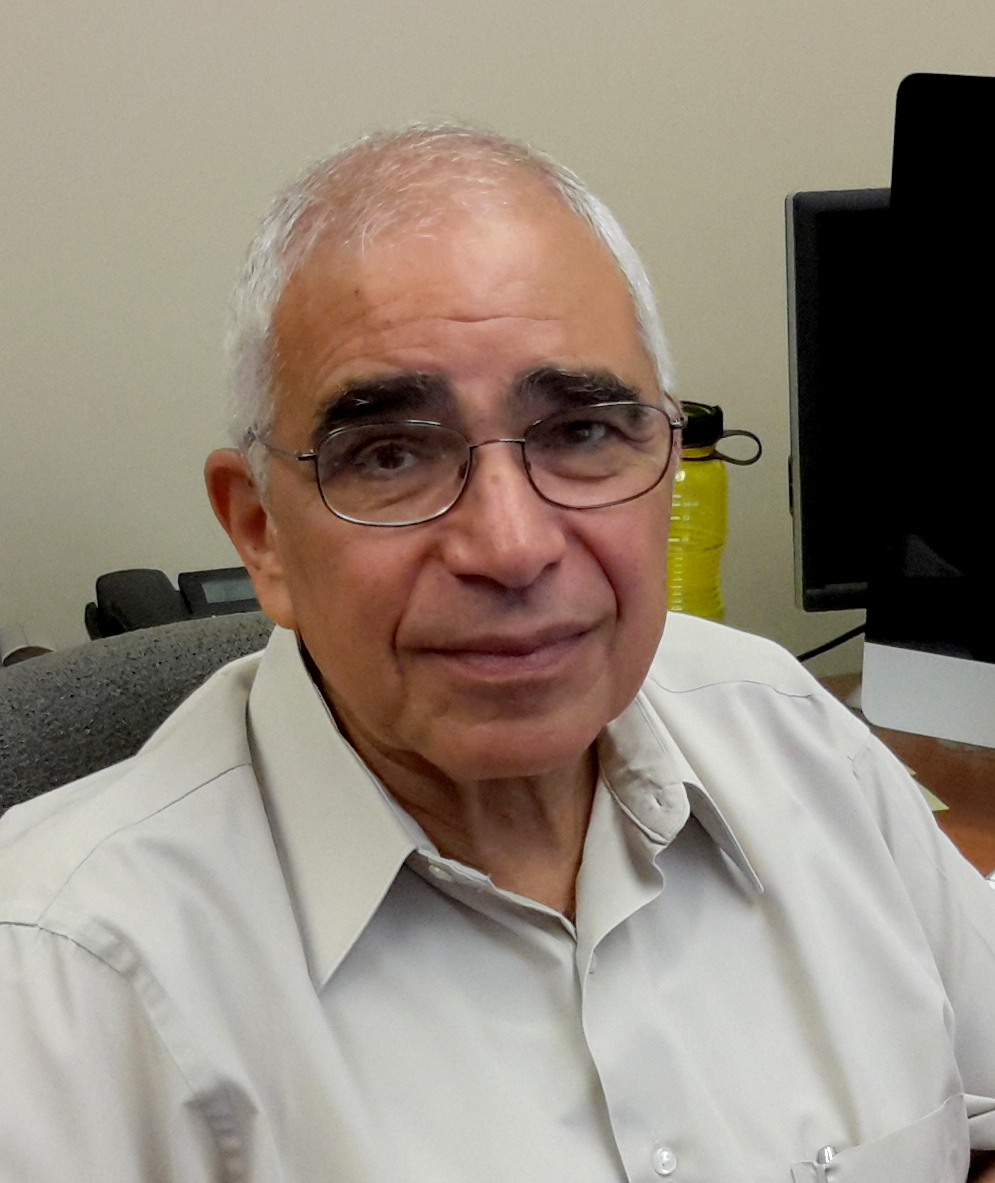
- Ahmed Sameh in May 2015
- Education: Alexandria University; Georgia Institute of Technology; University of Illinois at Urbana–Champaign
- Scientific career
- Fields: Numerical linear algebra
- Workplaces: University of Illinois at Urbana–Champaign; University of Minnesota; Purdue University
- Doctoral advisor: Alfredo Hua-Sing Ang
- Website: www.cs.purdue.edu/homes/sameh/

Ahmed Hamdy Mohamed Sameh is an Egyptian-American computer scientist, and the Samuel D. Conte Professor of Computer Science at Purdue University. He is known for his contributions to parallel algorithms in numerical linear algebra.

== Biography ==
Sameh received his BSc in civil engineering from the University of Alexandria, Egypt in 1961, MS in civil engineering from Georgia Institute of Technology in 1964 and PhD in civil engineering from the University of Illinois at Urbana–Champaign in 1968 under the supervision of Alfredo Hua-Sing Ang.

A conference on "High Performance Scientific Computing: Architectures, Algorithms, and Applications" was organized on October 11–12, 2010 at the Purdue University in honor of Sameh on the occasion of his 70th birthday.

== Research ==
Sameh and Eric Polizzi developed the SPIKE algorithm, a hybrid parallel solver for banded linear systems.

== Awards and honors ==
- Fulbright fellow, 1963–1964
- Fellow of SIAM, IEEE, AAAS and ACM
- William Norris Chair in Large Scale Computing, 1991–1992, 1993–1996
- IEEE's Harry H. Goode Memorial Award, 1999, for seminal and influential work in parallel numerical algorithms
- IEEE Computer Society Golden Core 1996 Charter Member
