= Petros Drineas =

Greek-American computer scientist

Petros Drineas is a Greek-American computer scientist known for his contributions to the theory of data science and the development of Randomized Numerical Linear Algebra (RandNLA). In a 2009 paper Michael W. Mahoney and Drineas introduced CUR matrix approximation for improved big data analysis. Drineas' work on the application of principal component analysis to population genetics in collaboration with Peristera Paschou disproved the long-standing hypothesis that the Minoan civilization had North African origins.

Drineas earned his BS in 1997 from University of Patras in Greece. He received his PhD in Computer Science from Yale University in 2003 where his advisor was Ravi Kannan. Drineas was on the faculty of Rensselaer Polytechnic Institute from 2003 to 2016 and was a visiting researcher at Microsoft Research, Yahoo! Research and Sandia National Laboratory. He is currently a professor of computer science at Purdue University.

Drineas is a co-editor with Peter Bühlmann, Michael Kane and M. van der Laan of "Handbook of Big Data" published in 2016.
