= Susanne Hambrusch =

Austrian-American computer scientist

Susanne Edda Hambrusch is an Austrian-American computer scientist whose research topics include data indexing for range queries, and computational thinking in computer science education. She is a professor of computer science at Purdue University.

== Education and career ==
Hambrusch earned an engineering diploma from TU Wien in 1977, and completed a Ph.D. in computer science at the Pennsylvania State University in 1982. Her dissertation, The Complexity of Graph Problems on VLSI, was supervised by Janos Simon.

She has been a faculty member at Purdue University since 1982, and was head of the computer science department there from 2002 to 2007 and again from 2018 to 2020. From 2010 to 2013 she took a leave from Purdue to head the Computing and Communication Foundations Division of the National Science Foundation.

== Recognition ==
Purdue University gave Hambrusch their Violet Haas Award, recognizing her contributions to the advancement of women at Purdue. Hambrusch was named as a 2020 ACM Fellow, "for research and leadership contributions to computer science education".
