= Athena Vakali =

Greek computer scientist

Athena I. Vakali
- Born: 1963 (age 62–63)
- Education: Aristotle University of Thessaloniki; Purdue University
- Occupation: Computer scientist
- Known for: Cloud computing

Athena I. Vakali (born 1963) is a Greek computer scientist whose topics of research include social networks, cloud computing, smart cities, and content delivery networks. She is a professor of informatics at Aristotle University of Thessaloniki.

Vakali earned a bachelor's degree in mathematics from Aristotle University of Thessaloniki in 1985, and a master's degree in computer science from Purdue University in 1988. Returning to Aristotle University of Thessaloniki, she completed a Ph.D. in informatics in 1997, and has been a member of the informatics faculty of the university since 1998.

She is the editor of books including Web Data Management Practices: Emerging Techniques and Technologies (with George Pallis, Idea Group, 2007), Content Delivery Networks (with Rajkumar Buyya and Mukaddim Pathan, Springer, 2008), and New Directions in Web Data Management (with Lakhmi C. Jain, Springer, 2011).

Vakali is an Association for Computing Machinery (ACM) Distinguished Speaker.
