= IEEE Transactions on Computational Biology and Bioinformatics =

Academic journal for computational biology and bioinformatics

- Discipline: Computational biology, Bioinformatics
- Language: English
- Edited by: Tamer Kahveci

Publication details
- Former names: IEEE/ACM Transactions on Computational Biology and Bioinformatics
- History: 2004–present
- Publisher: Institute of Electrical and Electronics Engineers
- Frequency: Bimonthly

Standard abbreviations
- ISO 4: IEEE Trans. Comput. Biol. Bioinform.

Indexing
- CODEN: ITCBCY
- ISSN: 1557-9964 (print); 2998-4165 (web)
- LCCN: 2003215338

Links
- Journal homepage; Online access

IEEE Transactions on Computational Biology and Bioinformatics (abbreviated TCBB) is a bimonthly peer-reviewed scientific journal. From 2004 to 2025 it was published under its former title IEEE/ACM Transactions on Computational Biology and Bioinformatics and was a joint publication of the IEEE Computer Society, the Association for Computing Machinery (ACM), the IEEE Computational Intelligence Society (CIS), and the IEEE Engineering in Medicine and Biology Society.

Since 2025 it has been published under its present title by the IEEE Computer Society, the IEEE Computational Intelligence Society (CIS), and the IEEE Engineering in Medicine and Biology Society.

Since its origin it has been published in cooperation with the IEEE Control Systems Society.

The journal covers research related to:

- algorithmic, mathematical, statistical, and computational methods used in bioinformatics and computational biology
- development and testing of effective computer programs in bioinformatics
- development and optimization of biological databases
- biological results that are obtained from the use of these methods, programs, and databases
- the field of systems biology.
