= Sonia Fahmy =

Computer scientist

Sonia Amin Fahmy is a computer scientist specializing in computer networking, including network architectures and communication protocols, and particularly known for her work on clustering in wireless ad hoc networks. She is a professor of computer science at Purdue University.

== Education and career ==
Fahmy studied computer science as an undergraduate at The American University in Cairo, graduating in 1992. After working for two years as a software engineer in Egypt, she went to the Ohio State University for graduate study in computer science, earning a master's degree there in 1996 and completing her Ph.D. in 1999. Her dissertation, Traffic Management for Point-to-Point and Multipoint Available Bit Rate (ABR) Service in Asynchronous Transfer Mode (ATM) Networks, was supervised by Rajendra Jain.

She joined the Purdue University faculty as an assistant professor in 1999, earned tenure as an associate professor there in 2005, and was promoted to full professor in 2011. She was named a University Faculty Scholar for 2015–2020.

== Recognition ==
In 2022, Fahmy was named an IEEE Fellow "for contributions to design and evaluation of network protocols and sensor networks".
