= Kevin C. Dittman =

American computer scientist

Kevin C. Dittman (born ca. 1960) is an American computer scientist, IT consultant and Professor of Information Technology at the Purdue University, especially known for his textbook Systems analysis and design methods written with Lonnie D. Bentley and Jeffrey L. Whitten, which is in its 7th edition.

Dittman received his BS in Computer Science from Purdue University in 1981 and his MA in Management Information Systems from the Florida Institute of Technology. He started his career in industry as programmer and analyst at an engineering company in 1981. From 1982 to 1985 he was systems analyst at a machine industry company. In 1985 he started at Lockheed Martin, where from 1985 to 1995 he was systems engineer, and from 1995 to 2011 consultant in the fields of Information Technology, Systems Engineering, Quality management, Process Management, and Project Management. In 1995 Dittman was appointed Professor of Information Technology at the Purdue University.

== Selected publications ==
Books, a selection:

- Bentley, Lonnie D., Kevin C. Dittman, and Jeffrey L. Whitten. Systems analysis and design methods. (1986, 1997, 2004).
- Whitten, Jeffery L., Lonnie D. Bentley, and Kevin C. Dittman. Fundamentals of systems analysis and design methods. (2004).
- Brewer, Jeffrey L., and Kevin C. Dittman. Methods of IT project management. Purdue University Press, 2013.
