= Corinth station (A-train) =

Proposed A-train commuter rail station in Corinth, Texas

Corinth

General information
- Location: Corinth, Texas
- Owner: Denton County Transportation Authority
- Line: A-train

Services
Preceding station	DCTA	Following station
MedPark toward Downtown Denton Transit Center	A-train	Highland Village/Lewisville Lake toward Trinity Mills

Corinth station is a proposed A-train commuter rail station that would serve the city of Corinth, Texas.

== History ==
In 2003, following the creation of the Denton County Transportation Authority (DCTA), the city of Corinth was one of five municipalities in Denton County to vote against joining the new transportation authority's service area. After the A-Train began revenue service in 2011, rail service from Denton to Lewisville began with no stops in Corinth city limits. In the years after, proposals to call another vote to join DCTA were floated in Corinth, but ultimately never happened.

Corinth renewed discussions with DCTA for an A-Train station starting in 2019, hoping to stimulate growth and new developments along the rail line. As of October 2025, the station is still in the planning phases, with Corinth expected to pay for the development of the station and its platforms.
