= Rio Grande Pacific =

American railroad holding company

The Rio Grande Pacific Corporation is a railroad holding company. Rio Grande Pacific Corporation plans, designs, implements, manages and operates short line railroads in the United States. The company was founded in 1986 with railroads in six states.

It owns five railroads:

- Idaho Northern and Pacific Railroad
- Nebraska Central Railroad
- New Orleans and Gulf Coast Railway
- Wichita, Tillman and Jackson Railway
- Bogalusa & Northern Railway

As of 2016, the company provides dispatching on ten short line railroads, including for the Denton County Transportation Authority A-train commuter rail.
