= Old Town station =

Old Town station may refer to:

- Old Town station (Staten Island Railway), New York, United States
- Oldtown railway station, Letterkenny, Ireland
- Old Town station (A-train), Lewisville, Texas, United States
- Old Town Transit Center, San Diego, California, United States
- Old Town/Chinatown MAX Station, Portland, Oregon, United States
- King Street–Old Town station, Alexandria, Virginia, United States
