= Lewisville, Texas =

- City
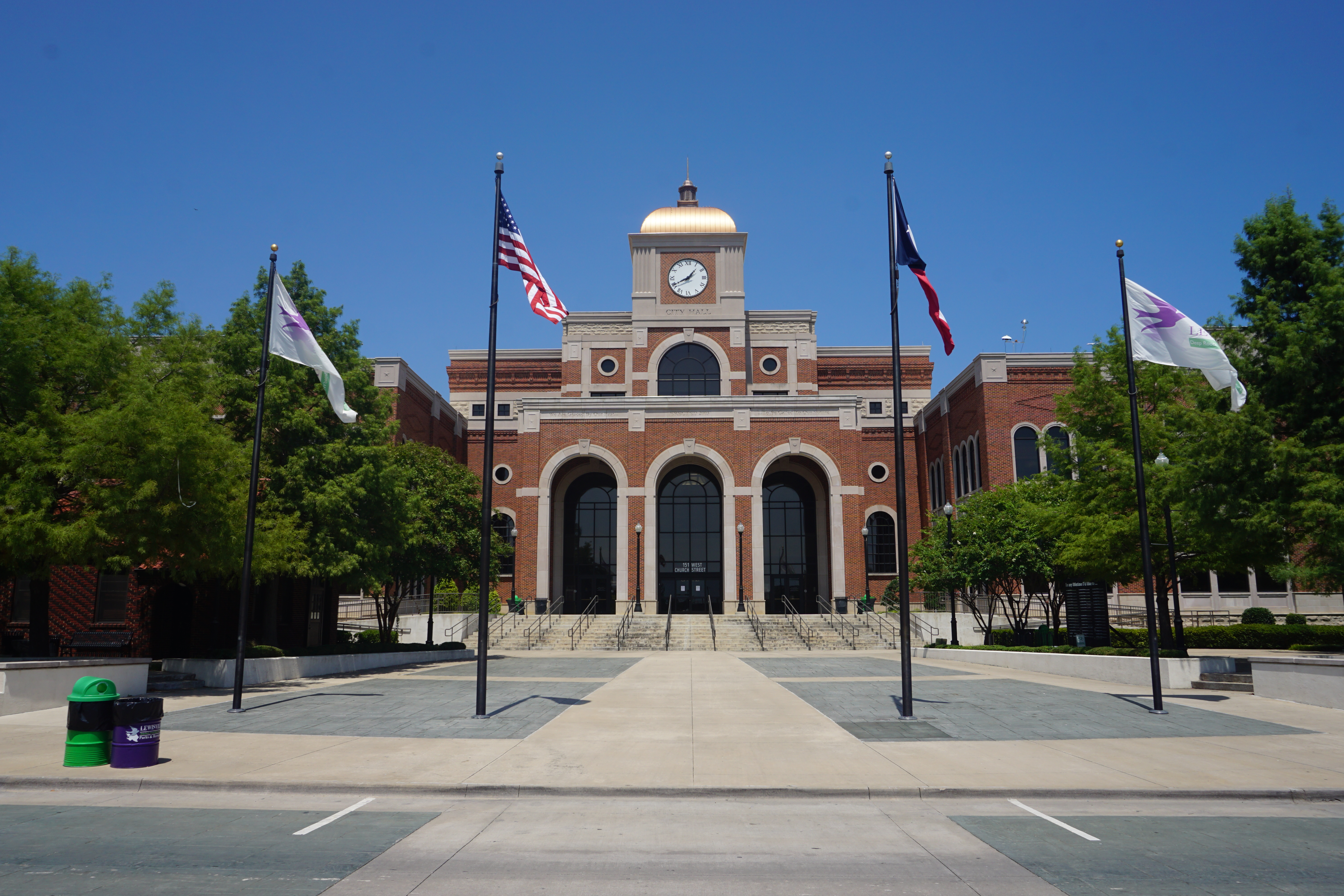
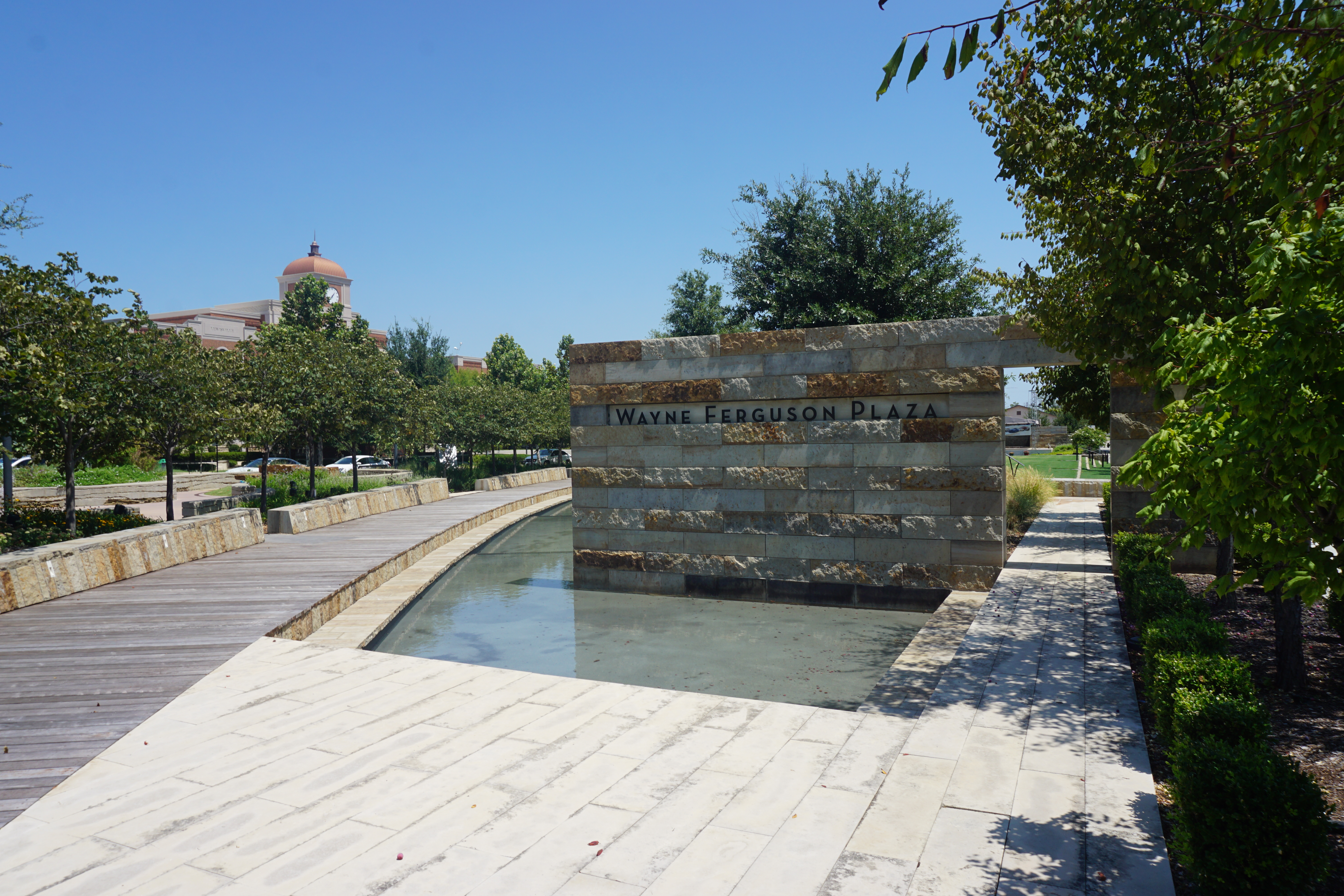
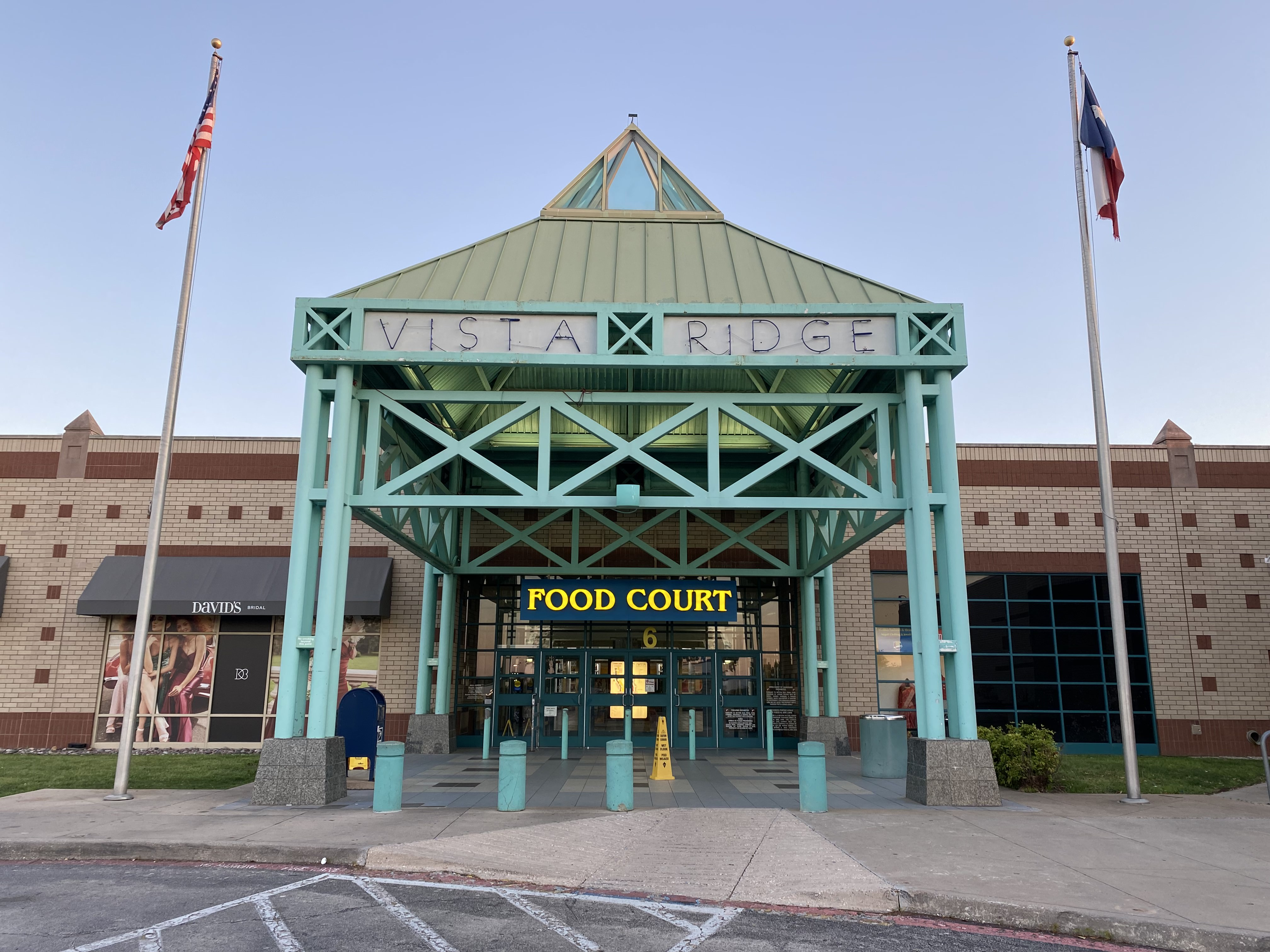
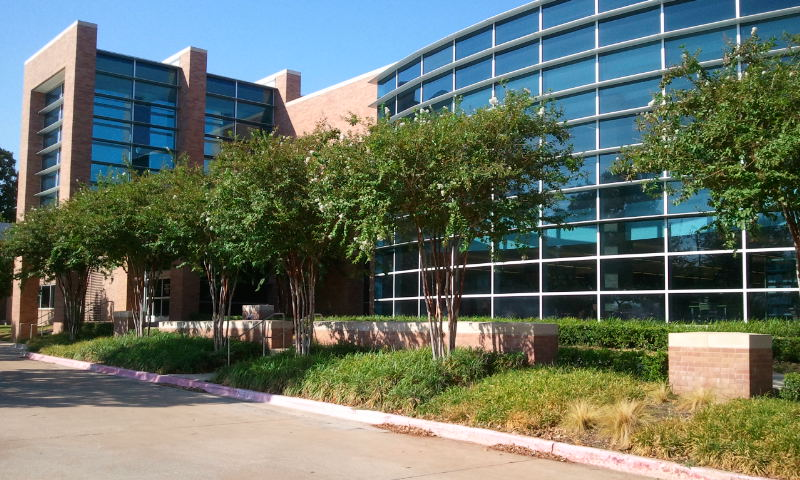
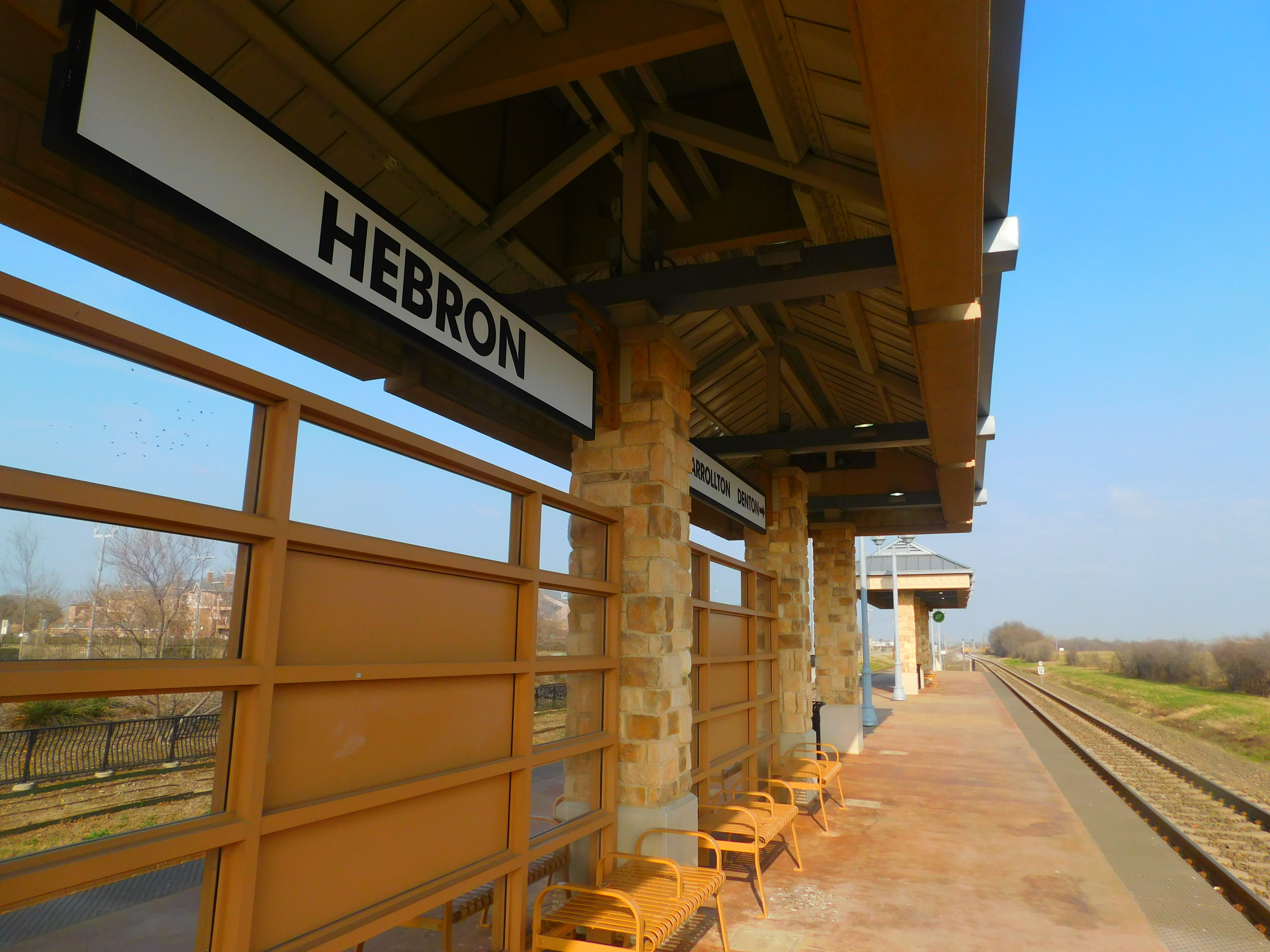
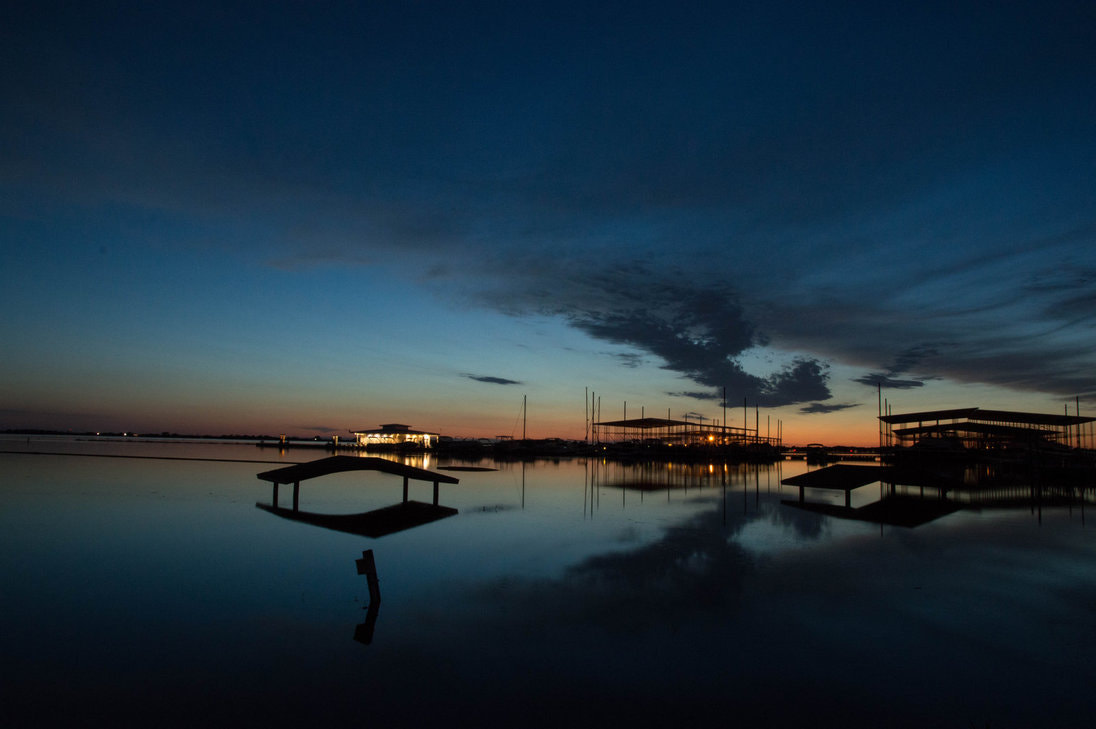
- Lewisville City Hall Wayne Ferguson Plaza Vista Ridge Mall Lewisville Public Library Hebron station Lewisville Lake at dusk

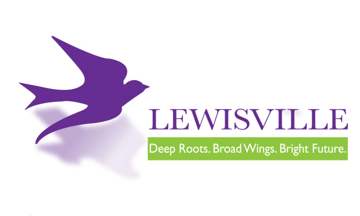
- Flag
- Motto: "Deep Roots. Broad Wings. Bright Future."
- Location of Lewisville in Denton County, Texas

- Location in the United States of America
- Coordinates: 33°02′18″N 97°00′22″W
- Country: United States
- State: Texas
- Counties: Denton, Dallas
- Incorporated: January 15, 1925

Government
  - Type: Council–manager

Area
  - City: 43.22 sq mi (111.94 km^{2})
  - Land: 37.01 sq mi (95.85 km^{2})
  - Water: 6.21 sq mi (16.09 km^{2})
- Elevation: 463 ft (141 m)

Population (2020)
  - City: 111,822
  - Estimate (2022): 131,215
  - Rank: US: 216th TX: 27th
  - Density: 2,951.0/sq mi (1,139.39/km^{2})
  - Metro: 7,943,685 (US: 4th)
- Time zone: UTC-6 (Central (CST))
  - Summer (DST): UTC-5 (CDT)
- ZIP codes: 75029, 75057, 75067, 75077
- Area codes: 214, 469, 945, 972
- FIPS code: 48-42508
- GNIS feature ID: 2410829
- Website: cityoflewisville.com

Lewisville (/ˈluːɪsvɪl/ LOO-iss-vil) is a city in the U.S. state of Texas, located in Denton County with portions extending into Dallas County. As one of the Mid-Cities within the Dallas–Fort Worth metroplex, the 2020 census reported a population of 111,822.

Originally called Holford's Prairie, Lewisville dates back to the early 1840s. The arrival of the town's first railroad in 1881 engendered its initial growth, and the expansion of the area's transportation infrastructure spurred further development in the early part of the 20th century. Lewisville incorporated in 1925, and when construction of Lewisville Lake was completed in the 1950s, the city began to expand rapidly.

Lewisville's proximity to Lewisville Lake has made it a recreational hub of the Dallas–Fort Worth metroplex. The area's transportation infrastructure has evolved around the I-35 Corridor along Interstate 35E. The diversity of its population and industry such as multiple landfills, has created a stable economic climate. Lewisville Independent School District provides most of the area's public education programs.

== History ==
=== Settlement ===
In 1841, the Republic of Texas chartered the Peters Colony Land Grant Company (named for William Smalling Peters, publisher of the song "Oh! Susanna") to settle the North Texas area. In 1844, John W. King and his wife settled on the east side of the prairie, where the city now lies. Baptist settlers from Platte County, Missouri, settled on the west side; among them were John and James Holford, who named the area Holford's Prairie. Further south, Presbyterians established a church and called it Flower Mound. In the confusion over land ownership after the Hedgcoxe War, Basdeal Lewis purchased Holford's Prairie in 1853 and renamed it after himself.

In 1845, the Fox family, which owned about a dozen slaves, buried a slave child called Melinda on the family farm, which eventually became the town's cemetery for black residents. Named Fox–Hembry Cemetery, the plot still exists today. After it had fallen into disrepair, local residents and businesses gathered to restore it in 2011. Though Abraham Lincoln was not on the ballot in the area for the 1860 Presidential election, residents of Lewisville (listed as "Hollforts" on election results) still gave John C. Breckinridge only a 44–31 majority over an electoral fusion option.

During Reconstruction, Lewisville became home to Denton County's first cotton gin. Built in 1867, it could produce up to three bales per day. The Thirteenth Texas Legislature chartered the Dallas and Wichita Railroad (later the Missouri–Kansas–Texas) on terms requiring 20 miles of track to be in running order by July 1, 1875. Lewisville paid the company $15,000 to come to the city, with a promise of another $5,000 on completion. The company fulfilled the deal by completing the railroad tracks to a point just south of Lewisville on the morning of the deadline, and the line began running full-time in 1881. Republicans in the Fourteenth Texas Legislature passed a law on April 30, 1874, prohibiting alcohol within two miles of the town. Many residents ignored the law, however, and the city retained as many as 17 saloons at one point. The population of the unincorporated town was 500 in 1888.

=== Progress ===
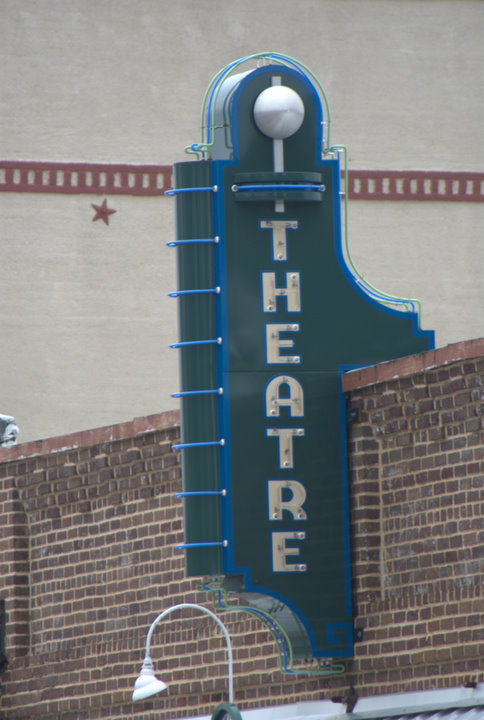
The building currently housing the Greater Lewisville Community Theater, built in 1885, is the oldest standing structure in Lewisville.

On January 15, 1925, residents voted by a margin of 17 votes to incorporate Lewisville, which established its official boundaries as a city. By 1930, Lewisville's population had increased to 853, making it the fourth-most populous municipality in Denton County (behind Denton, Sanger, and Pilot Point).

Because the city's economy had become diversified before the Wall Street Crash of 1929, Lewisville was relatively well insulated from the Great Depression. Many residents, including business leaders, nevertheless supported the New Deal programs of Franklin D. Roosevelt. By 1936, the Works Progress Administration operated a cannery in the city to provide temporary jobs for unemployed residents. As an extension of the Good Roads Movement, which had been prominent in Denton County since the early 1910s, residents formed the Good Roads Committee of Lewisville to lobby state and federal officials for funding to create better streets. Lewisville celebrated the paving of the U.S. Route 77 between Denton and Dallas in 1931 with a "Coming Out of the Mud" ceremony. The new pavement closed the "Lewisville Gap" between the two cities, a stretch of dirt road through the city that often became too muddy for travel.

The new road also led indirectly to the downfall of the area's public transportation system. Between 1925 and 1932, the Texas Interurban Railway, an electric commuter rail service that ran from Dallas to Denton, operated a station in Lewisville. Business leaders in the Lewisville Chamber of Commerce welcomed the service at the time, proudly citing the city's progressive citizenship. The area's low population density could not sustain the venture, however, and in 1932, the line went out of business and immediately halted service.

On April 25, 1934, Raymond Hamilton of the Barrow gang robbed the First National Bank of Lewisville. Residents chased him to Howe, Texas, where he was captured at a roadblock and transferred to Dallas County Jail.

=== Growth ===
Lewisville's rapid growth began when construction of the Garza–Little Elm Dam finished in 1954, expanding the Garza–Little Elm Reservoir into what is now Lewisville Lake. The city adopted a home-rule charter for a council–manager style of municipal government in 1963, becoming one of only a few home-rule cities in Texas with a population less than 5,000. In September 1969, 13 days after Woodstock, the city hosted the Texas International Pop Festival, which drew over 150,000 spectators and featured performances by Janis Joplin, B.B. King, and Led Zeppelin. In 2011, the Texas Historical Commission dedicated a historical event marker at the Hebron A-train station in Lewisville to commemorate the event.

When Dallas/Fort Worth International Airport opened to the south of the city in 1974 and Vista Ridge Mall opened at the intersection of Interstate 35E and Round Grove Road in 1989, Lewisville began to undergo rapid suburban growth. Its population increased from 24,273 in 1980 to 46,521 in 1990, making it the 40th-most populous city in Texas. In the early 1990s, the Lewisville Chamber of Commerce marketed the city with the slogan "City of Expanding Horizons". Its population reached 77,737 in 2000, 95,290 in 2010, and 111,822 in 2020. In November 2021, the city completed the annexation of the Castle Hills development, located northeast of the city, into its boundaries, adding almost 3000 acres and 18,000 residents.

== Geography ==
Lewisville has a total area of 42.5 square miles (110 km^{2}), of which 6.1 sq mi (16 km^{2}) is covered by water. It lies at the southern end of Denton County and the northern end of the Dallas–Fort Worth metroplex, in the eastern part of the Cross Timbers region of Texas between the Texas Blackland Prairies and the Grand Prairie. Vista Ridge, a small plateau, is in the southeastern corner of Lewisville, and the lowest part of Denton County, at 484 feet (148 m), is found in the city. Lewisville sits above the Barnett Shale, a geological formation containing a large quantity of natural shale gas.

Water constitutes about 14% of the city's total area, including Lewisville Lake, the Elm Fork of the Trinity River, and two local tributaries of the Elm Fork - Prairie Creek and Timber Creek. A riparian zone encompasses a portion of the city in the southeast. The intersection of the Elm Fork and Lake Lewisville has given rise to a delta at the southern end of the lake, extending 6.9 miles (11.1 km) south. The Federal Emergency Management Agency has labeled much of the area surrounding the delta as "Zone AE", meaning the area is subject to 100-year flood precautions.

=== Climate ===
Lewisville's climate is classified as humid subtropical. Its Köppen climate classification is Cfa, which means it has a temperate climate, does not have a dry season, and has a hot summer. According to the United States Department of Agriculture, Lewisville is in a hardiness zone of 8a. The city is seldom affected by extreme weather, but Hurricane Carla in 1961 brought 86-mile-per-hour (138 km/h) winds and caused 6-foot (1.8 m) swells on Lewisville Lake. During heavy rains, Timber Creek can overflow its banks, and on rare occasions, flood some of the surrounding homes. The National Weather Service defines no official borders for Tornado Alley, but Lewisville is considered to be in it.

Climate data for Lewisville, Texas
Month	Jan	Feb	Mar	Apr	May	Jun	Jul	Aug	Sep	Oct	Nov	Dec	Year
Record high °F (°C)	90 (32)	96 (36)	99 (37)	102 (39)	107 (42)	108 (42)	113 (45)	113 (45)	111 (44)	103 (39)	99 (37)	89 (32)	113 (45)
Mean daily maximum °F (°C)	53.3 (11.8)	59.2 (15.1)	67.2 (19.6)	74.4 (23.6)	81.7 (27.6)	89.2 (31.8)	94.1 (34.5)	93.5 (34.2)	86.1 (30.1)	76.3 (24.6)	64.1 (17.8)	56.0 (13.3)	74.6 (23.7)
Daily mean °F (°C)	42.7 (5.9)	48.0 (8.9)	55.9 (13.3)	63.4 (17.4)	71.6 (22.0)	79.1 (26.2)	83.6 (28.7)	82.7 (28.2)	75.6 (24.2)	65.3 (18.5)	53.6 (12.0)	45.4 (7.4)	63.9 (17.7)
Mean daily minimum °F (°C)	32.0 (0.0)	36.8 (2.7)	44.6 (7.0)	52.4 (11.3)	61.4 (16.3)	69.0 (20.6)	73.1 (22.8)	71.9 (22.2)	65.0 (18.3)	54.3 (12.4)	43.0 (6.1)	34.8 (1.6)	53.2 (11.8)
Record low °F (°C)	−3 (−19)	−2 (−19)	5 (−15)	23 (−5)	35 (2)	48 (9)	51 (11)	52 (11)	36 (2)	16 (−9)	10 (−12)	0 (−18)	−3 (−19)
Average precipitation inches (mm)	1.94 (49)	2.55 (65)	2.82 (72)	3.30 (84)	5.41 (137)	3.29 (84)	2.53 (64)	2.26 (57)	3.35 (85)	4.81 (122)	2.87 (73)	2.66 (68)	37.79 (960)
Average snowfall inches (cm)	.2 (0.51)	.5 (1.3)	.1 (0.25)	0 (0)	0 (0)	0 (0)	0 (0)	0 (0)	0 (0)	0 (0)	0 (0)	.3 (0.76)	1.1 (2.8)
Average precipitation days (≥ 0.01 in)	6.7	6.1	7.0	7.1	8.4	6.4	4.4	4.7	5.8	6.8	6.8	6.5	76.7
Average snowy days (≥ 0.1 in)	.4	.2	.1	0	0	0	0	0	0	0	.1	.2	1
Source: NOAA (1971–2000)

== Demographics ==
Historical population
Census	Pop.	Note	%±
1880	466		—
1890	498		6.9%
1930	853		—
1940	873		2.3%
1950	1,516		73.7%
1960	3,956		160.9%
1970	9,264		134.2%
1980	24,273		162.0%
1990	46,521		91.7%
2000	77,737		67.1%
2010	95,290		22.6%
2020	111,822		17.3%
2023 (est.)	133,553		19.4%
U.S. Decennial Census; 2020 Census

As of the 2020 census, 111,822 people lived in Lewisville.

=== Racial and ethnic composition ===
Lewisville city, Texas – Racial and ethnic composition Note: the US Census treats Hispanic/Latino as an ethnic category. This table excludes Latinos from the racial categories and assigns them to a separate category. Hispanics/Latinos may be of any race.
Race / Ethnicity (NH = Non-Hispanic)	Pop 2000	Pop 2010	Pop 2020	% 2000	% 2010	% 2020
White alone (NH)	53,706	47,280	40,675	69.09%	49.62%	36.37%
Black or African American alone (NH)	5,628	10,370	17,282	7.24%	10.88%	15.45%
Native American or Alaska Native alone (NH)	399	.347	345	0.51%	0.36%	0.31%
Asian alone (NH)	2,990	7,325	12,534	3.85%	7.69%	11.21%
Pacific Islander alone (NH)	22	59	69	0.03%	0.06%	0.06%
Other Race alone (NH)	89	220	512	0.11%	0.23%	0.46%
Mixed race or Multiracial (NH)	1,104	1,906	4,552	1.42%	2.00%	4.07%
Hispanic or Latino (any race)	13,799	27,783	35,853	17.75%	29.16%	32.06%
Total	77,737	95,290	111,822	100.00%	100.00%	100.00%

=== 2020 census ===
As of the 2020 census, there were 43,926 households, 24,536 families, and the median age was 33.5 years; 23.7% of residents were under the age of 18 and 9.3% were 65 years of age or older. For every 100 females there were 95.4 males, and for every 100 females age 18 and over there were 93.3 males age 18 and over. Of the 43,926 households counted by the 2020 census, 32.6% had children under the age of 18 living in them. Of all households, 40.9% were married-couple households, 21.2% were households with a male householder and no spouse or partner present, and 30.0% were households with a female householder and no spouse or partner present. About 29.8% of all households were made up of individuals and 6.4% had someone living alone who was 65 years of age or older. There were 46,656 housing units, of which 5.9% were vacant. The homeowner vacancy rate was 0.8% and the rental vacancy rate was 7.6%. As of the 2020 census, 99.5% of residents lived in urban areas, while 0.5% lived in rural areas. The 2020 census recorded the following racial composition:

Racial composition as of the 2020 census
Race	Number	Percent
White	46,844	41.9%
Black or African American	17,699	15.8%
American Indian and Alaska Native	1,339	1.2%
Asian	12,638	11.3%
Native Hawaiian and Other Pacific Islander	86	0.1%
Some other race	15,747	14.1%
Two or more races	17,469	15.6%
Hispanic or Latino (of any race)	35,853	32.1%

By the 2020 census, its racial and ethnic makeup was 36.37% non-Hispanic White, 15.45% Black or African American, 0.31% Native American, 11.21% Asian, 0.06% Pacific Islander, 0.46% some other race, 4.07% multiracial, and 32.06% Hispanic or Latino American of any race.

=== 2010 census ===
The 2010 census recorded a population of 95,290 in Lewisville, up from the 77,737 recorded for the 2000 census, making it one of the 25 fastest-growing city populations in the United States. The 2010 population was made up of 37,496 households and 23,417 families. Its racial makeup in 2010 was 65.3% White, 11.2% African American, 0.7% Native American, 7.8% Asian (including a growing diaspora from Myanmar), 11.3% from other races, and 3.2% from two or more races. At 2010's census, 29.2% of the population was considered to be of Hispanic or Latino origin. Children under 18 lived in 35.5% of the households. The average household size was 2.53 persons and the average family size was 3.21 persons. The median age was 30.9 years. Between 2007 and 2011, the median income for a Lewisville household was $56,811, and per capita income was $28,144. About 9.6% of the population was below the poverty line, as compared to 17% for Texas as a whole.

=== 2000 census ===
The 2000 census recorded 77,737 people in Lewisville.

The 41,101 households in 2019 had an average household size of 2.63. The average family size was 3.44. About 76.6% of Lewisville's residents were native-born and 21.6% were foreign-born. Of the immigrant population, 39.7% were naturalized U.S. citizens. The majority of its immigrant population had lived in the city before 2010. Roughly 40% entered after 2010. At home, 34.6% spoke another language other than English. From 2014-2019, the median household income increased to $65,836. Resident households had a mean income of $79,211.

== Economy ==
The city has a diverse commercial tax base. Its top employers include JPMorgan Chase, Lewisville Independent School District, and Nationstar Mortgage. Automobile dealerships and multiple landfills have flourished there, including Huffines Auto Dealerships and Village Auto Group, which was ranked as one of the top "Powerhouses of the New Economy" by Black Enterprise magazine in 2000.

Lewisville's lake and the city's location in the DFW metroplex have contributed to the largest boat-sales market in the state by volume in a state second in the nation in overall boat sales. Because of the city's proximity to Dallas and Fort Worth, a number of food distribution companies have branches in Lewisville, including Sysco and Meadowbrook Meat Company (MBM). Fleming Companies, one of the United States' largest food distribution companies, relocated to Lewisville in 2000, but it filed for Chapter 11 bankruptcy in 2003 after the U.S. Securities and Exchange Commission announced the company had been hiding massive losses. Responsive Education Solutions, which operates charter schools nationwide, is also headquartered in Lewisville. Adeptus Health, a health-care provider, and the utility company Texas—New Mexico Power are also headquartered in the city.

== Arts and cultural life ==
=== Lewisville Grand Theater ===
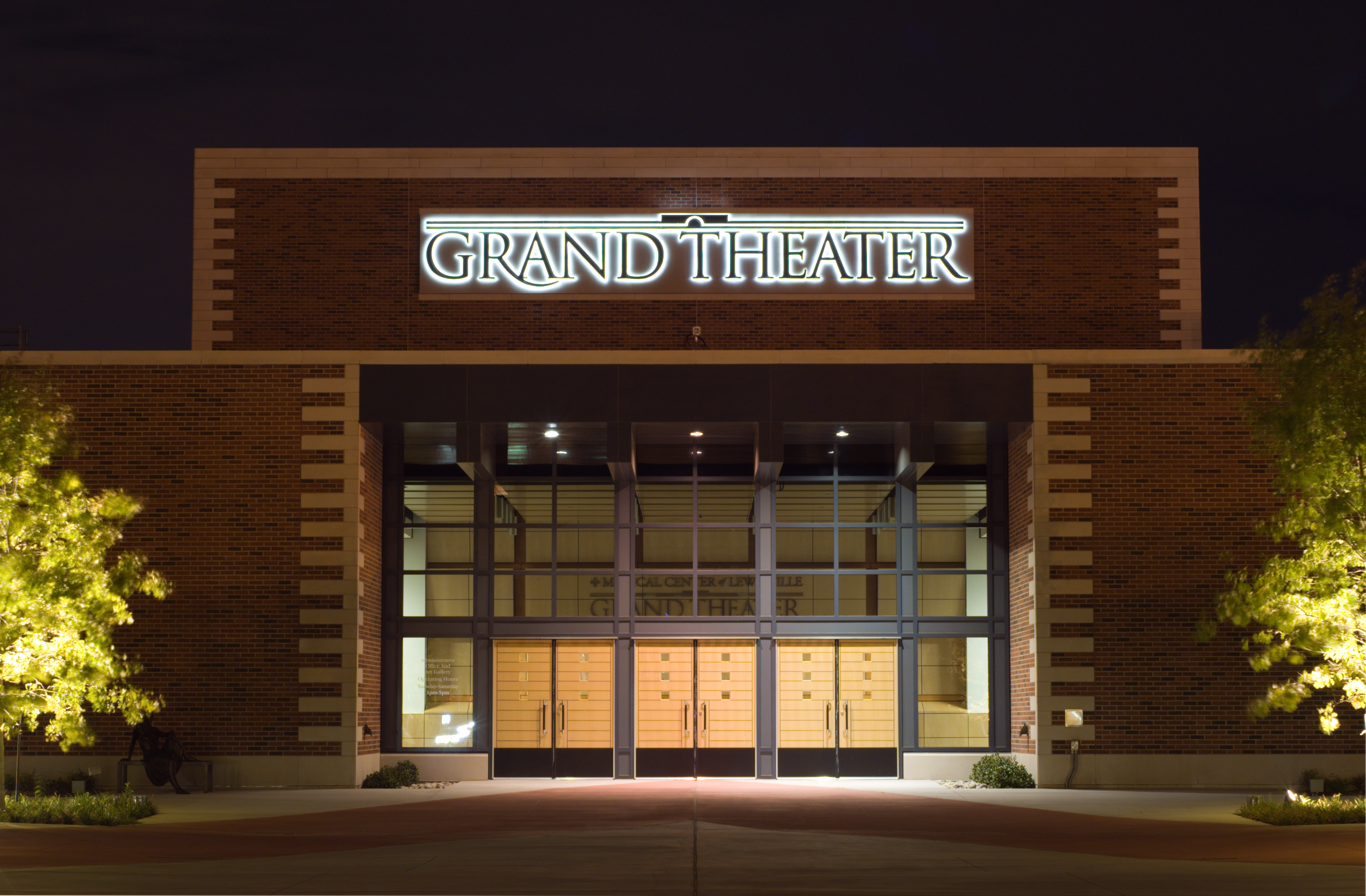
The Lewisville Grand Theater, which opened in 2011

The Lewisville Grand Theater, known informally as The Grand, is on the east side of Interstate 35E in Lewisville's Old Town. It is a hub for the arts in Lewisville, able to show films, host meetings, and provide a venue for various kinds of artistic performances. The project began in 2004 and aimed to fulfill a long-term goal of building an arts center to coincide with the 2011 opening of the Old Town Station. The facility opened in January 2011 with a series of performances, children's shows, concerts, and exhibits, and the Greater Lewisville Arts Alliance presented the theater with a $25,000 contribution to begin their fundraiser to place a Steinway piano in the theater. In 2011 and 2012, The Flower Mound Connection newspaper named the MCL Grand the best events venue in Denton County.

The facility originally was called Medical Center of Lewisville Grand Theater as part of a 10-year naming-rights agreement with the local hospital. It later changed name to Medical City Lewisville Grand Theater when the hospital was rebranded. The naming rights agreement with Medical City Lewisville ended in December 2020 and the facility was renamed Lewisville Grand Theater.

=== Libraries ===
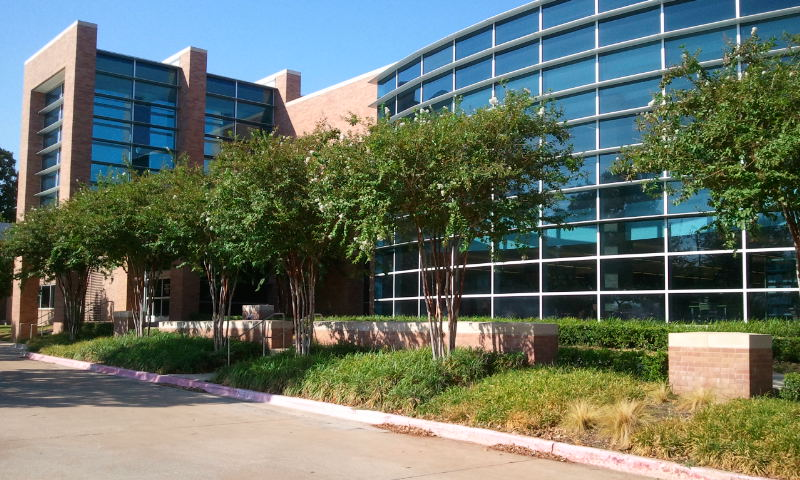
Front of the Lewisville Public Library building, which opened in 2006

The city government created the Lewisville Public Library in 1968, naming Cindy Bennett as its first director. A 5,000 sq ft (460 m^{2}) structure was built where the city hall now stands. A new library facility was built in 1986 as part of the municipal building on Main Street. In 2001, Lewisville voters approved a 4B tax package, part of which was dedicated to building a new library facility, the children's wing of which was dedicated to Bennett. The $11 million renovation opened in 2006, and it received the Achievement of Excellence in Libraries Award in that year and again in 2009. Lewisville was also the temporary home of the George W. Bush Presidential Library until 2013.

=== Media ===
Lewisville is served mainly by media from the Dallas area, but a number of niche publications focus on local news. The Lewisville Enterprise merged with The Lewisville Leader in 1962. The paper's publisher and editor at the time, U.O. Clements, was a staunch conservative, but vociferously supported the racial integration of Lewisville Independent School District, for which he received many anonymous threats from members of the Ku Klux Klan. Clements sold the paper to Harte-Hanks Community Newspapers in 1971. Star Newspapers, which owned the Leader, was purchased by 1013 Communications in 2012. The newspaper is based in Plano, Texas. In 2011, the Lewisville City Council designated the Lewisville portion of Neighborsgo, a weekly section of The Dallas Morning News, as the city's official newspaper of record.

== Parks and recreation ==
Skateboarders at Scion Skate Park in Toyota of Lewisville Railroad Park

The city of Lewisville operates public recreation facilities, including parks, two recreation centers, and approximately 14 miles (23 km) of trails. The $20 million Railroad Park was built in 2009 using the revenue from a quarter-cent sales tax increase; it was the largest capital project in the city's history at the time. It was renamed Toyota of Lewisville Railroad Park in 2010 in a deal worth $1.5 million. The park has a baseball/softball complex, a football complex, eight lighted soccer fields, two concession buildings, a perimeter walking/jogging trail, three man-made lakes, a dog park and the Scion Skate Park. Since 2010, the skate park has hosted the Scion Regional Amateur Tour, part an annual series of six skateboarding competitions held across the country. In 2012, the venue hosted its first annual triathlon event benefiting the Court Appointed Special Advocates (CASA) of Denton County.

Lewisville Lake Park comprises 662 acres (268 ha), which the city leases from the United States Army Corps of Engineers. The park includes various amenities, including athletic fields and designated campgrounds. The Lewisville Fishing Barge, an indoor–outdoor fishing facility that opened in 1958, is on the lake. The park also hosts the Rick Neill Memorial, a cross-country running meet the Lewisville High School track and field team organizes each year. In February 2013, the city began to review a development proposal to build a resort hotel and convention center on a 60-acre (0.24 km^{2}) parcel of land next to the lake.

Lewisville Lake Environmental Learning Area (LLELA) is a 2,600 acres (1,100 ha) nature preserve managed by the city in partnership with Lewisville ISD and UNT. It has over 7 miles of hiking trails as well as opportunities for fishing, kayaking, and canoeing. LLELA serves as the centerpiece for the city's Green Centerpiece Master Strategy, which aims to preserve the natural spaces around Lake Lewisville and establish the city as a major recreation destination within the DFW metro area.

Lewisville is also a major hub of the Northern Golf Corridor of the Dallas–Fort Worth metroplex. Located on the city's southeast edge, the Lakes at Castle Hills is a Jay Morrish-designed course which opened in the late 1990s; critics have rated the course highly, praising its amenities and difficulty level. Lake Park Golf Course, near Lewisville Lake, is noted for its beginner-friendly design. The nine-hole, 1,724-yard (1,576 m) Lake Park Executive course opened in 1994. Lewisville is also home to professional golfer Chad Campbell, winner of the 2003 Tour Championship.

In 2011, the Lewisville Park Board proposed a new master plan for the city's parks and recreation facilities. It specifies a major overhaul of the city's trail system, including 51 miles (82 km) of off-street trails, 50 miles (80 km) of enhanced sidewalks, 50 miles (80 km) of bicycle routes, a 7.4-mile (11.9 km) paddling trail down the Elm Fork of the Trinity River, and 31 major and minor trailheads throughout the area, many of which would connect to other trail networks. The plan includes numerous crossings of Interstate 35E for pedestrian and bicyclist safety. In March 2012, the Park Board began reviewing a new master plan to address the next ten years of park development in the city.

== Education ==
Lewisville educational attainment
	Lewisville	Texas	United States
High school graduate or higher	86.7%	80.4%	85.4%
Bachelor's degree or higher	29.7%	26.1%	28.2%
Source: U.S. Census Bureau, 2007–2011 American Community Survey

Lewisville Independent School District operates the area's public school system, including Lewisville High School. Four of the district's middle schools feed into two high school feeder campuses; since the 2011–2012 school year, the Killough and Harmon campuses have served the city's ninth- and tenth-grade students, while the main campus at the intersection of FM 1171 (Main Street) and Valley Parkway is used primarily for eleventh- and twelfth-grade students. The district also operates the Technology Exploration and Career Center, with two locations (East and West), along with conducting a night high school in Lewisville.

According to American Community Survey results from 2007 to 2011, 86.7% of the city's population aged 25 or older had graduated from high school, 29.7% held a bachelor's degree or higher, and 8.4% held a graduate or professional degree. The survey estimated that 24,879 Lewisville residents over the age of three were enrolled in schools.

In addition there are two private schools located in Lewisville: Explorations Preparatory School and Lakeland Christian Academy.

Founders Classical Academy, a charter school operated by Lewisville-based ResponsiveEd, is also located in Lewisville.

== Government ==
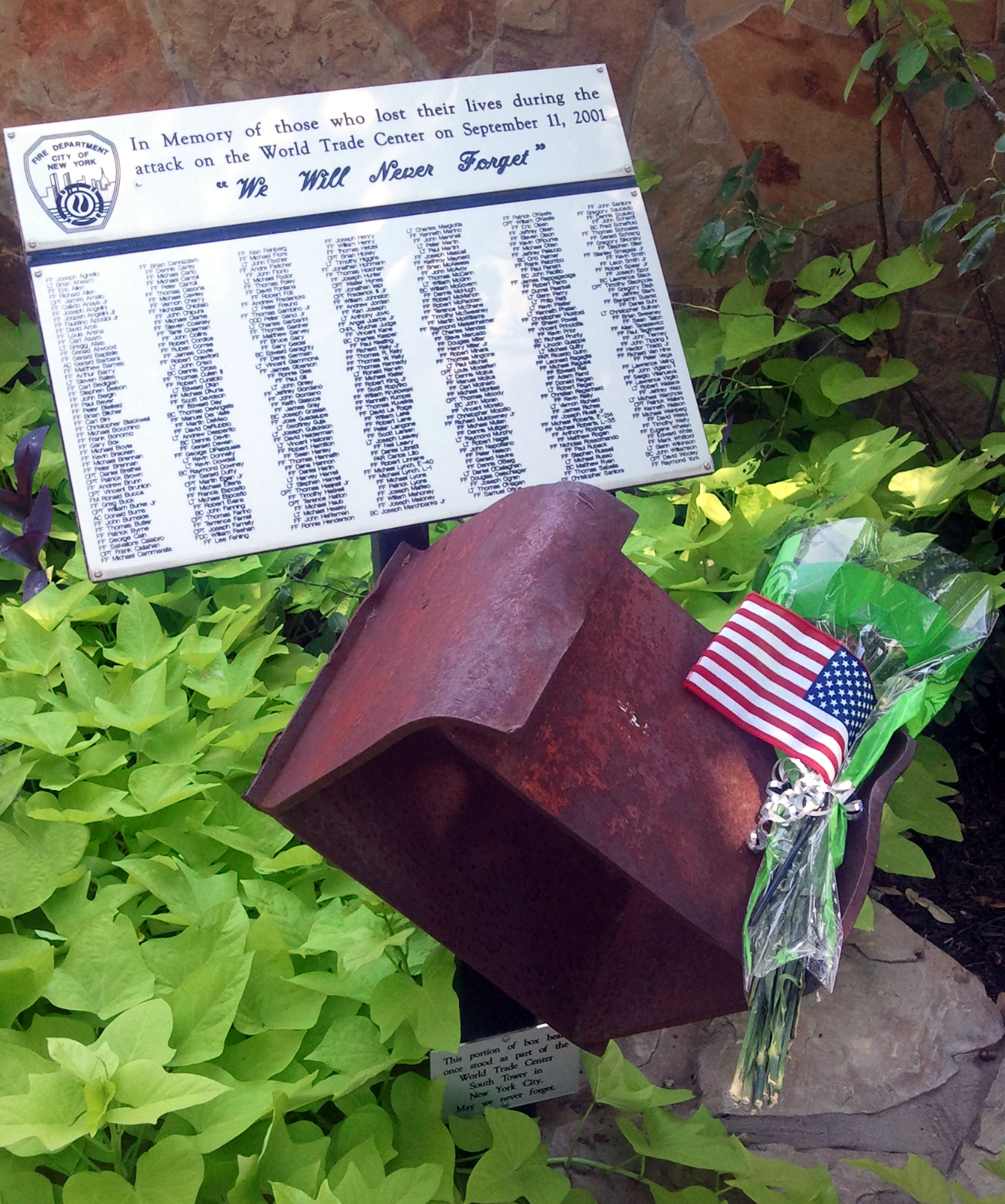
A box beam from the World Trade Center South Tower stands on display in front of the Lewisville Fire Department offices as a memorial to those who died as a result of the September 11 attacks.

Since 1963, the City of Lewisville has operated as a home rule city with a council–manager style of municipal government. Residents elect six at-large members to serve on the City Council, including a mayor. Council elections in Texas are nonpartisan. Members are elected to three-year terms and are not term-limited. The mayor does not vote on issues that come before the council except in the case of a tie. There were three female mayors between 1985 and 2000, but no woman has served on the City Council since 2001. In 2011, the Fitch Group upgraded the city's general obligation bond rating from "AA+" to "AAA". Lewisville has the lowest municipal property tax rate in the Dallas–Fort Worth metroplex. In the fiscal year 2012–2013, the city government's operating funds totaled $124,845,436.

The Lewisville Police Department had 27 sworn police officers in 1977, and the number had increased to 136 by 2007. As of 2015, the department included 229 full-time employees, four of whom were administrators. The Lewisville Fire Department included 146 full-time employees, six of whom were administrators. After the September 11 attacks, the fire department and its then chief, Rick Lasky, attracted national attention when they raised a large amount of donations for victims' families. As a reward, John Travolta, Joaquin Phoenix, and Robert Patrick visited the department in 2004 to promote the release of the film Ladder 49. In May 2011, Lewisville residents approved a sales tax increase to create two public safety districts. The revenue from the increase will fund investments in the city's police and fire departments, including new officers and vehicles, as well as a new fire station in the eastern part of the city.

Lewisville is in the 26th Congressional district in Texas, which is represented in the United States House of Representatives by Michael C. Burgess. As of 2023, the city is represented in District 12 of the Texas Senate by Tan Parker. The city is split between two Texas House of Representatives districts: District 63, represented by Ben Bumgarner, and District 65, represented by Kronda Thimesch. Lewisville is a voluntary member of the North Central Texas Council of Governments, the purpose of which is to coordinate individual and collective local governments and facilitate regional solutions, eliminate unnecessary duplication, and enable joint decisions.

== Transportation ==
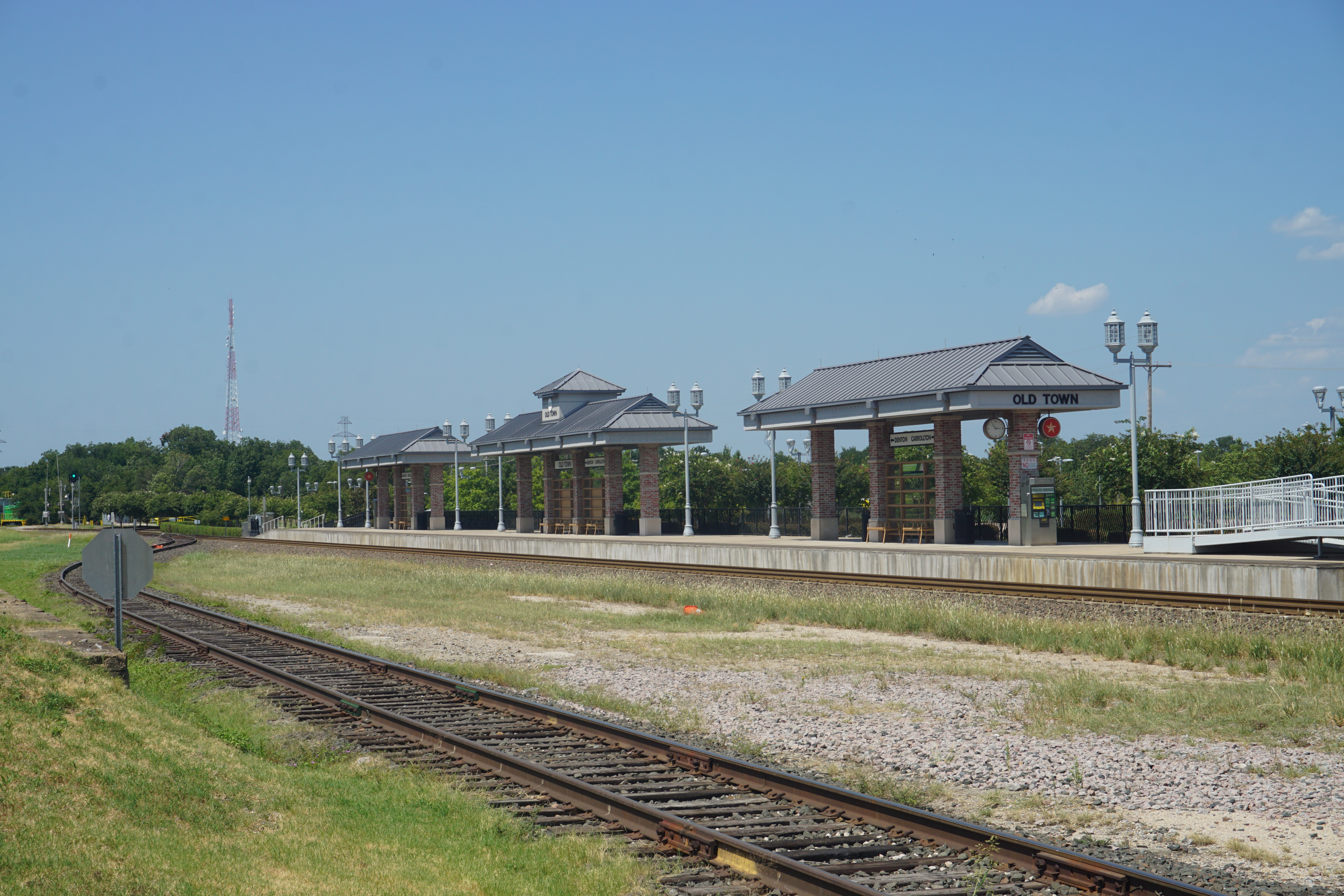
The Old Town A-train station in Old Town Lewisville, opened in 2011

The primary freeway running through Lewisville is Interstate 35E, which runs north–south through the city. Before it was built, US Highway 77 (now Mill Street) was the main through route, connecting the city with Denton to the north and Dallas to the south. In 1998, the Texas Department of Transportation carried out a Major Investment Study to examine the possibility of expanding the section of Interstate 35E between Interstate 635 and U.S. Route 380, the primary focus being an 8-mile (13 km) stretch from Texas State Highway 121 to the bridge crossing Lewisville Lake. The project is scheduled to add one general-purpose lane in each direction, in addition to a managed toll lane. The project is expected to allow the city to substantially renovate its portion of the I-35 Corridor. Construction on the first phase of the project is projected to begin in summer 2013 and finish in late 2016.

Texas State Highway 121, which runs along the Sam Rayburn Tollway, intersects with Interstate 35E in the southeastern edge of the city. Farm to Market Road 1171, known in the city as Main Street, runs east–west across the middle part of the city from Interstate 35E to Interstate 35W. Farm to Market Road 407 runs east–west across the northern part of the city. Lewisville also encompasses most of Farm to Market Road 3040, which runs east–west towards Carrollton and Flower Mound.

Lewisville residents voted in a special election held on September 13, 2003, to become a full member of the Denton County Transportation Authority (DCTA). The authority began running a regional bus service in November 2006. In 2011, the Old Town, Hebron, and Highland Village/Lewisville Lake stations opened as commuter stops along the route of the DCTA's A-train. The route continues north to Denton and south to Trinity Mills Station in Carrollton, where it connects with the Dallas Area Rapid Transit (DART) Green Line to Dallas. DCTA also owns a Rail Operation and Maintenance Facility in Lewisville.

In September 2021, DCTA launched GoZone, an on-demand transit service in partnership with Via Transportation, throughout Denton County. In December 2021, fixed-route Lewisville Connect bus services ceased operating, with GoZone in place to cover transit throughout the city.
