= First Transit =

American transit company (1955–2023)

- Parent: Transdev
- Founded: 1955
- Defunct: 2023
- Headquarters: Cincinnati, Ohio
- Service area: United States, Canada, Puerto Rico, India, Panama
- Service type: Fixed Route, Paratransit, Shuttle, Transit Management, MaaS, Microtransit, Autonomous Vehicle, Rail System, Bus Rapid Transit, Call Centers, Maintenance Services
- Website: www.firsttransit.com

First Transit was an American transportation company. Headquartered in Cincinnati, Ohio, it operated over 300 locations, carrying more than 350 million passengers annually throughout the United States in 41 states, Puerto Rico, Panama, India and four Canadian provinces. In 2023 it was purchased by Transdev with the brand retired.

== History ==
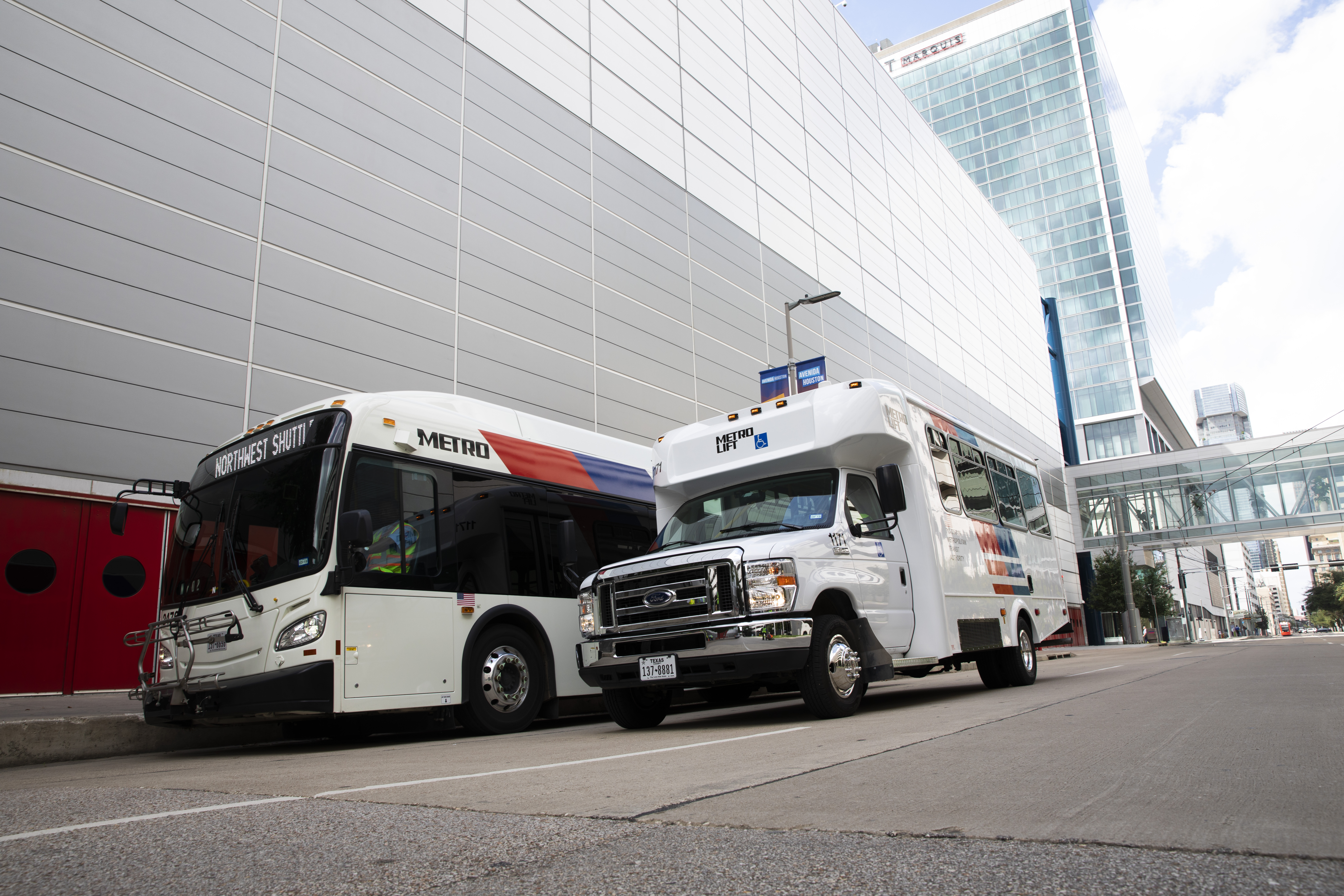
First Transit operated Fixed Route and Paratransit vehicles

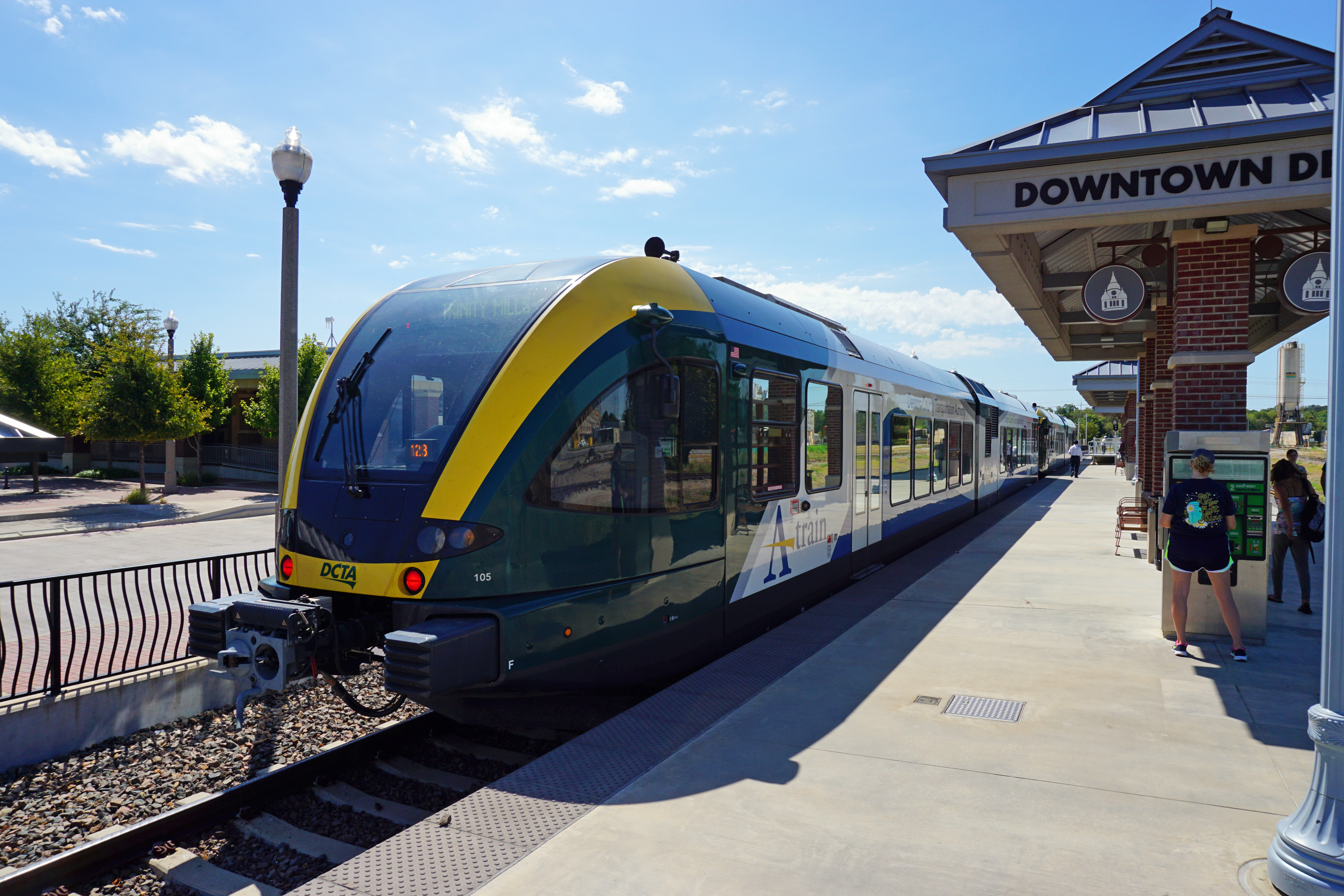
A-train Stadler GTW at Downtown Denton Transit Center in December 2015

American Transportation Enterprises was founded in 1955. It was acquired by Ryder in 1986. First Transit was formed in 1999 when FirstGroup acquired Ryder. In 2007, First Transit acquired Cognisa, a company specializing in shuttle services. Also in 2007, FirstGroup acquired Laidlaw, and merged Laidlaw's transit operations with First Transit.

In April 2016, First Transit commenced operating a five-year contract for Hinjewadi Techzone IT Park in India. In October 2016, First Transit commenced its first rail contract operating the A-train for the Denton County Transportation Authority for a period of nine years.

In December 2016, First Transit began operating the first SAV passenger shuttle route in North America, using the EasyMile EZ10 to loop through Bishop Ranch Office Park in San Ramon, California. Since then, First Transit has gone on to operate many SAV initiatives including a Minnesota SAV Roadshow with stops at Minnesota State Capitol and 3M Global Headquarters and Milo in Arlington, Texas. Milo was the first SAV operation open to the public and shuttled passengers to Globe Life Park and AT&T Stadium.

In 2017, First Transit signed an agreement as the exclusive transit operator partner at GoMentum Station. GoMentum Station is the largest of 10 federally funded secure testing facilities for autonomous and connected vehicle technology in the U.S.

In April 2021, FirstGroup agreed terms were to sell the business to EQT AB. The sale completed later in 2021.

In October 2022, Transdev agreed terms to purchase First Transit. The transaction was completed on March 7, 2023, with all operations rebranded as Transdev and the First Transit brand retired.

== Operations ==
First Transit had more than 19,000 employees and operated and maintains more than 49,000 vehicles and pieces of equipment.
