= Texas International Pop Festival =

Music festival in Texas, United States

Coordinates: 33.008°N 96.973°W

- Texas International Pop Festival poster
- Genre: Rock, pop, etc.
- Locations: Lewisville, Texas; United States
- Years active: 1969
- Founders: Interpop Superfest

The Texas International Pop Festival was a music festival held at Lewisville, Texas, on Labor Day weekend, August 30 to September 1, 1969. It occurred two weeks after Woodstock. The site for the event was an open field just south and west of the newly opened Dallas International Motor Speedway, located on the east side of Interstate Highway 35E, across from the Round Grove Road intersection.

== History ==
The festival was the brainchild of Angus G. Wynne III, son of Angus G. Wynne, the founder of the Six Flags Over Texas Amusement Park. Wynne was a concert promoter who had attended the Atlanta International Pop Festival on the July Fourth weekend. He decided to put a festival on near Dallas, and joined with the Atlanta festival's main organizer, Alex Cooley, forming the company Interpop Superfest.

Artists performing at the festival were: Canned Heat, Chicago (then called Chicago Transit Authority), the James Cotton (Blues Band), Delaney and Bonnie and Friends, Grand Funk Railroad, The Incredible String Band, Janis Joplin, B.B. King, Freddie King, Led Zeppelin, Herbie Mann, Nazz, Rotary Connection, Sam and Dave, Santana, John Sebastian, Shiva's Headband, Sly and the Family Stone, Space Opera, Spirit, Sweetwater, Ten Years After, Tony Joe White and Johnny Winter.

North of the festival site was the campground on Lewisville Lake, where hippie attendees skinny-dipped and bathed. Also on the campground was the free stage, where some bands played after their main stage gig and several bands not playing on the main stage performed. It was on this stage that Hugh Romney, head of the Hog Farm commune of Woodstock fame, was given his sobriquet, Wavy Gravy, by King.

The Merry Pranksters, Ken Kesey's group, were in charge of the free stage and camping area. While Kesey was neither at the Texas event nor at Woodstock, his right-hand man, Ken Babbs, and his psychedelic bus Further were. The Hog Farm peacefully provided security, a "trip tent," and free food.

Attendance at the festival remains unknown, but is estimated between 120,000 and 150,000. As with Woodstock, there were no violent crimes reported. There was one death, due to heatstroke, and one birth.

High-quality soundboard bootleg recordings of almost the entire festival are circulated on the internet. Led Zeppelin's set is regarded as one of the best-known Led Zeppelin bootlegs noted for the quality of both the recording and the performance.

== Schedule ==
The Festival began at 4:00 p.m. each day. Grand Funk Railroad (announced as "Grand Funk Railway") opened all three days and played through the afternoon heat till the 4:00 p.m. opening band. BB King played all three nights and told the same jokes and stories, perhaps thinking he had a different 150,000 person crowd for each show.

Saturday, August 30

1. Grand Funk Railroad
2. Canned Heat
3. Chicago Transit Authority
4. James Cotton Blues Band
5. Janis Joplin
6. B.B. King
7. Herbie Mann
8. Rotary Connection
9. Sam & Dave

Sunday, August 31

1. Grand Funk Railroad
2. Chicago Transit Authority
3. James Cotton Blues Band
4. Delaney & Bonnie & Friends
5. The Incredible String Band
6. B.B. King
7. Led Zeppelin (announced as "The Led Zeppelin")
8. Herbie Mann
9. Sam & Dave
10. Santana

Monday, September 1

1. Grand Funk Railroad
2. Johnny Winter
3. Delaney & Bonnie & Friends
4. B.B. King
5. Nazz
6. Sly and the Family Stone
7. Spirit
8. Sweetwater
9. Ten Years After
10. Tony Joe White

== Memorial ==
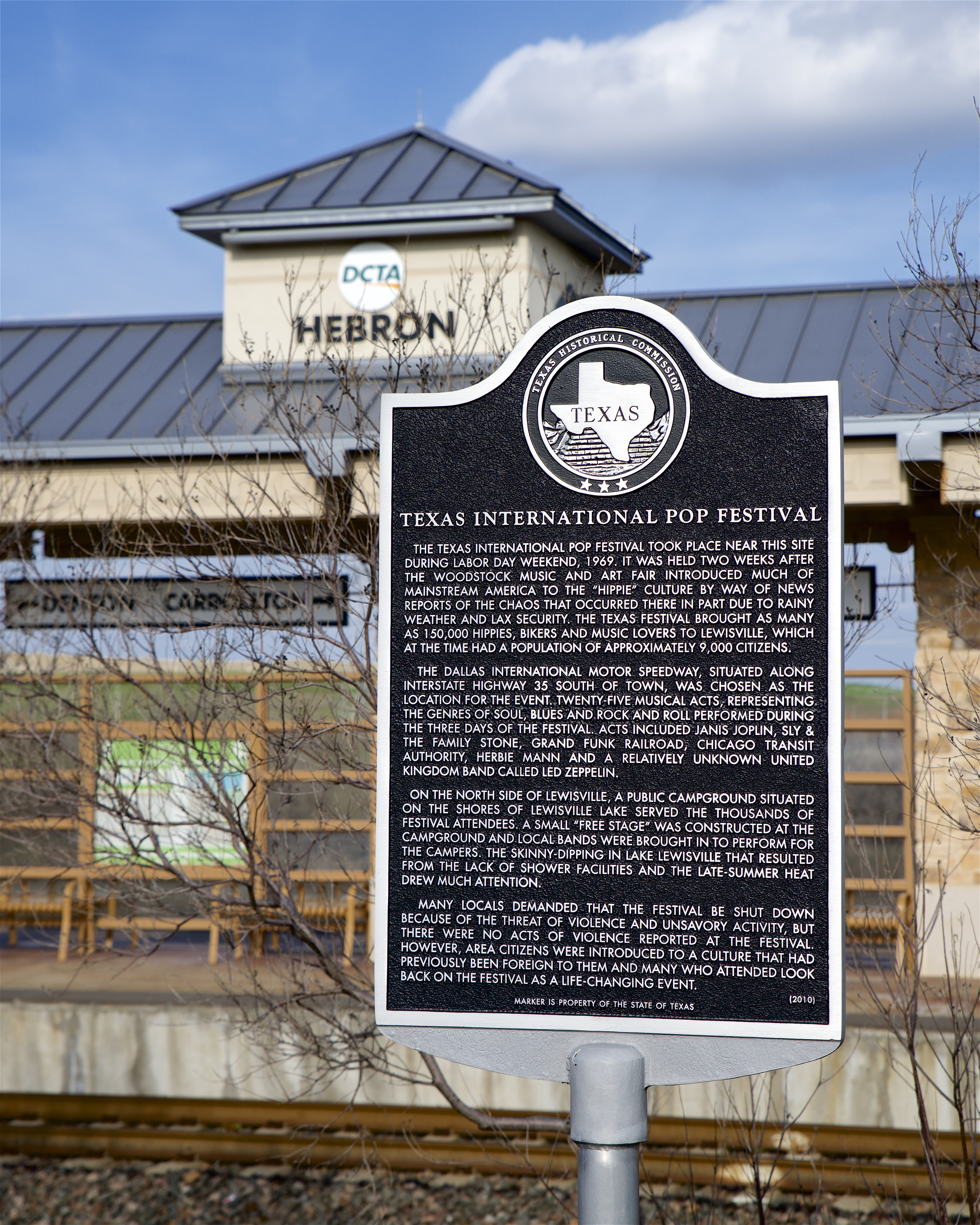
A plaque commemorating the festival, placed at Hebron station in Lewisville (former site of Dallas International Motor Speedway).

On January 29, 2010, the Texas Historical Commission approved the placement of a state historical marker near Hebron Station, a Denton County Transportation Authority train station in eastern Lewisville, close to the former site of the festival stage. A benefit concert was held in Lake Dallas, Texas, on January 31, 2010, to raise the $1,500 required to pay for this marker. The marker was placed at the site with a formal dedication ceremony held at the nearby train station on October 1, 2011. A current overlay map shows the main concert stage area now covered by the Hebron-121 Station town home development, and the festival grounds covered by a chicken restaurant to the north and the Edgewater Apartments to the south.

== See also ==
- List of historic rock festivals
- List of music festivals
