= Hebron station =

A-train commuter rail station in Lewisville, Texas

Hebron
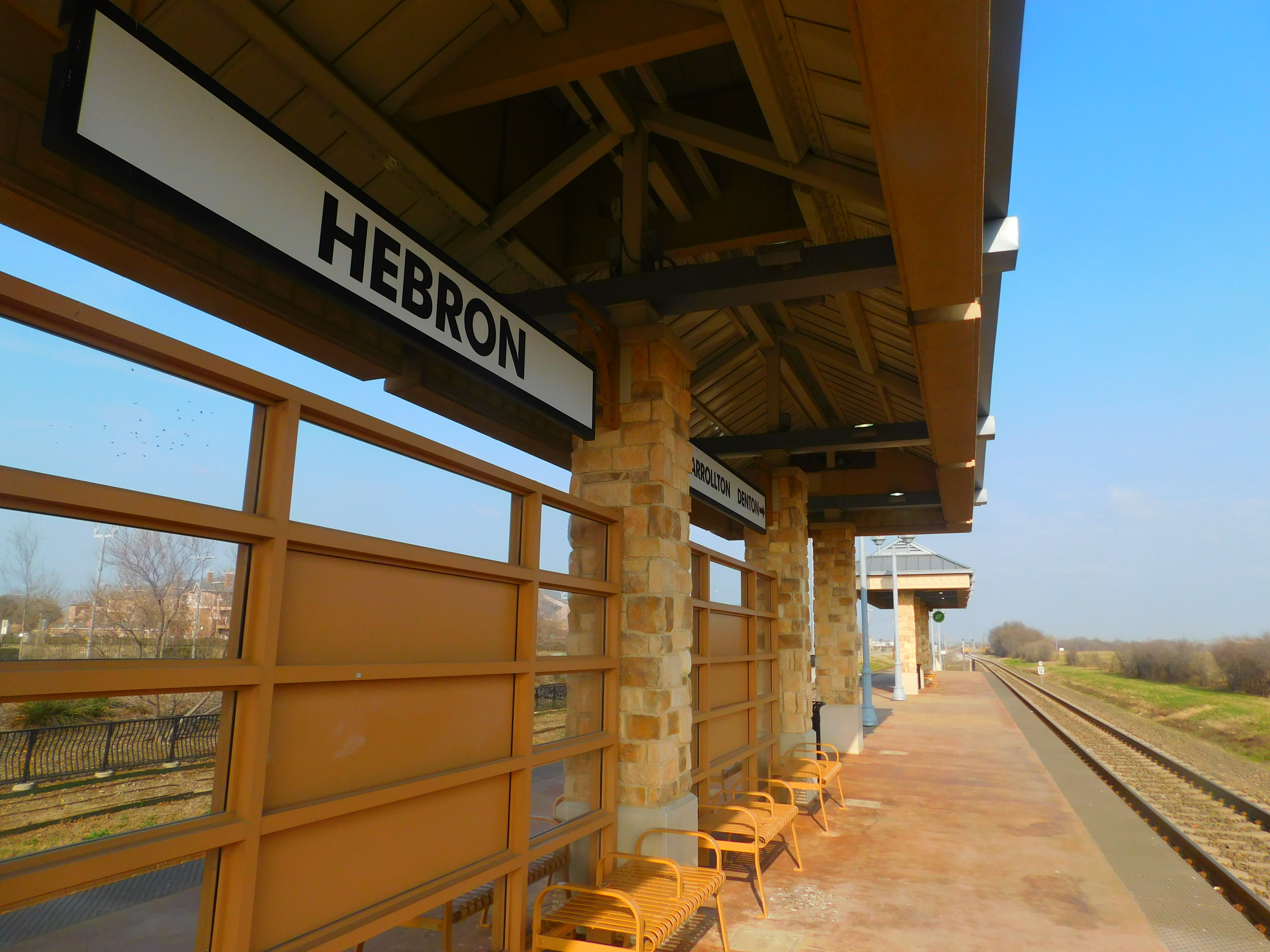
- The A-train station at Hebron in February 2017.

General information
- Location: 952 Lakeside Circle; Lewisville, Texas 75057
- Coordinates: 33°00′37″N 96°57′31″W
- Owner: Denton County Transportation Authority
- Line: A-train
- Platforms: 1 island platform
- Tracks: 2
- Connections: GoZone Lewisville/Highland Village

Construction
- Structure type: At-grade
- Parking: 406 spaces
- Accessible: Yes

History
- Opened: June 18, 2011

Services
Preceding station	DCTA	Following station
Old Town toward Downtown Denton Transit Center	A-train	Trinity Mills Terminus
Location

Hebron station is an A-train commuter rail station in Lewisville, Texas. The station is a park-and-ride lot serving southern Lewisville, including the Vista Ridge Mall retail area.

The station is located near the interchange between Interstate 35E and the Sam Rayburn Tollway. It is named for the adjacent Hebron Parkway, which in turn is named for the city of Hebron. The city itself is four miles east of the station.

On A-train maps, the station is represented by a green circle containing a leaf.

== History ==
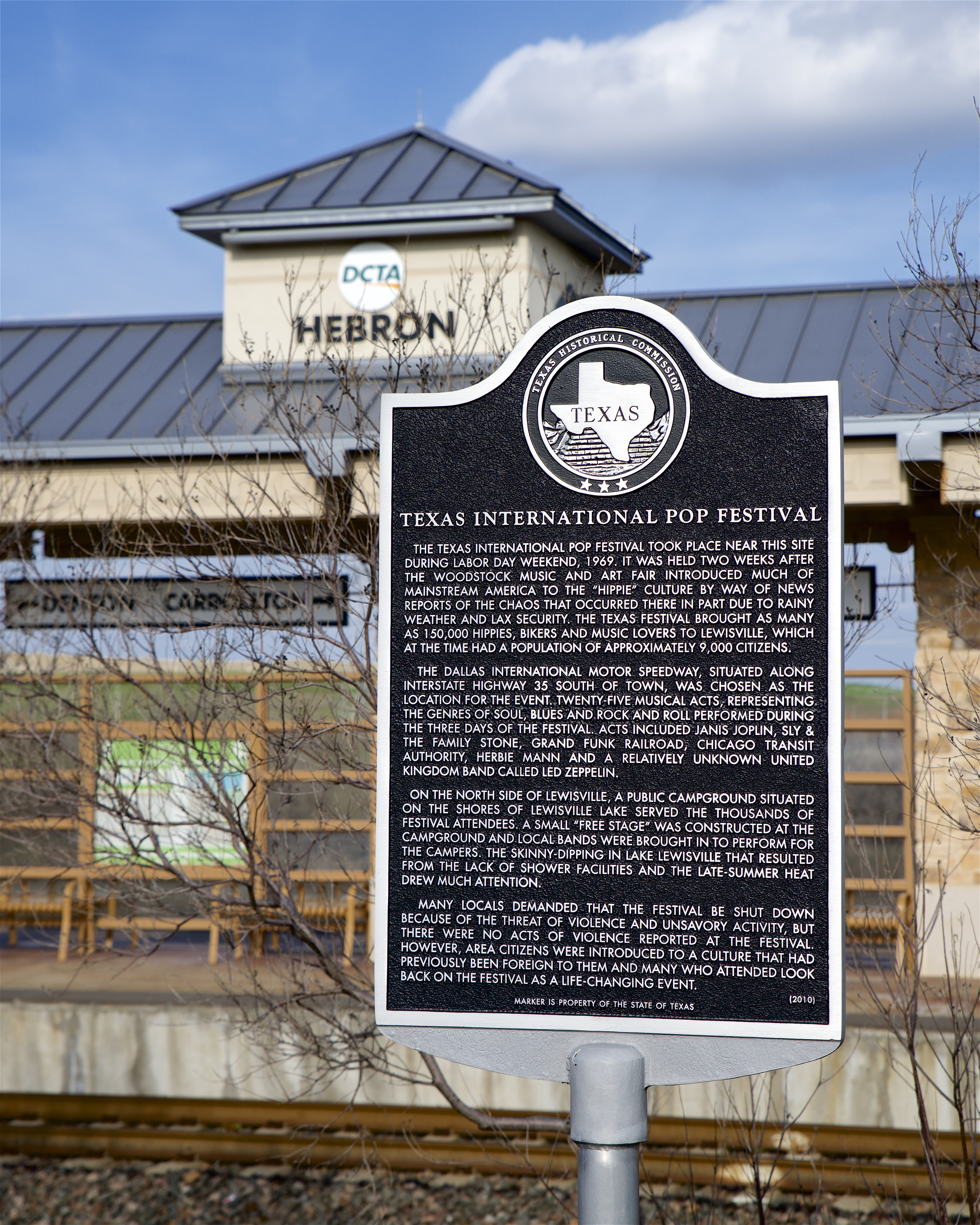
A historical marker at Hebron station commemorating the Texas International Pop Festival.

=== Construction ===
A groundbreaking ceremony for Hebron station was held on March 27, 2009. The ceremony was the first groundbreaking held for the A-train, as well as the first in DCTA's history.

In January 2010, the Texas Historical Commission approved the placement of a state historic marker in front of the station to commemorate the Texas International Pop Festival, which had been held at the same site in 1969.

In June 2010, a concrete pump at the station's construction site collapsed, killing two workers and injuring two more.

In late 2010, ground was broken on Hebron 121 Station, a 90-acre transit-oriented development project adjacent to the station. The project was described as the largest transit-oriented development in the region.

On December 6, 2010, Dallas Area Rapid Transit opened the northern segment of the Green Line, which the A-train would connect to at Trinity Mills. In tandem with the Green Line's opening, DCTA held a "Countdown to Connectivity" event, which included a preview ride between the Hebron and Trinity Mills stations.

=== Service ===
Hebron station, along with the rest of the A-train, opened on June 18, 2011. The line's opening ceremony, dubbed the "Rock n' Rail Station Celebration", saw local musical acts playing at all five DCTA-built stations, including Hebron. The station entered revenue service the following Monday.

In 2015, DCTA broke ground on the Lewisville Hike and Bike Trail, which would roughly parallel the A-train's tracks between Hebron station and Highland Village/Lewisville Lake station. The first segment of the trail, which ran from Hebron to Downtown Lewisville, opened in 2016. An extension of the trail south of Hebron has been proposed.

In 2017, DCTA announced the creation of a fare-free zone between Hebron and Trinity Mills.

In 2019, DCTA introduced Lewisville Lakeway, an on-demand service connecting Hebron station to Lakeway Business Park. In mid-2021, Lewisville Lakeway was superseded by GoZone, a similar program serving the entire city of Lewisville. Later that year, DCTA's two Lewisville bus routes, both of which stopped at Hebron, were also eliminated in favor of GoZone.
