= MedPark station =

A-train commuter rail station in Denton, Texas

MedPark
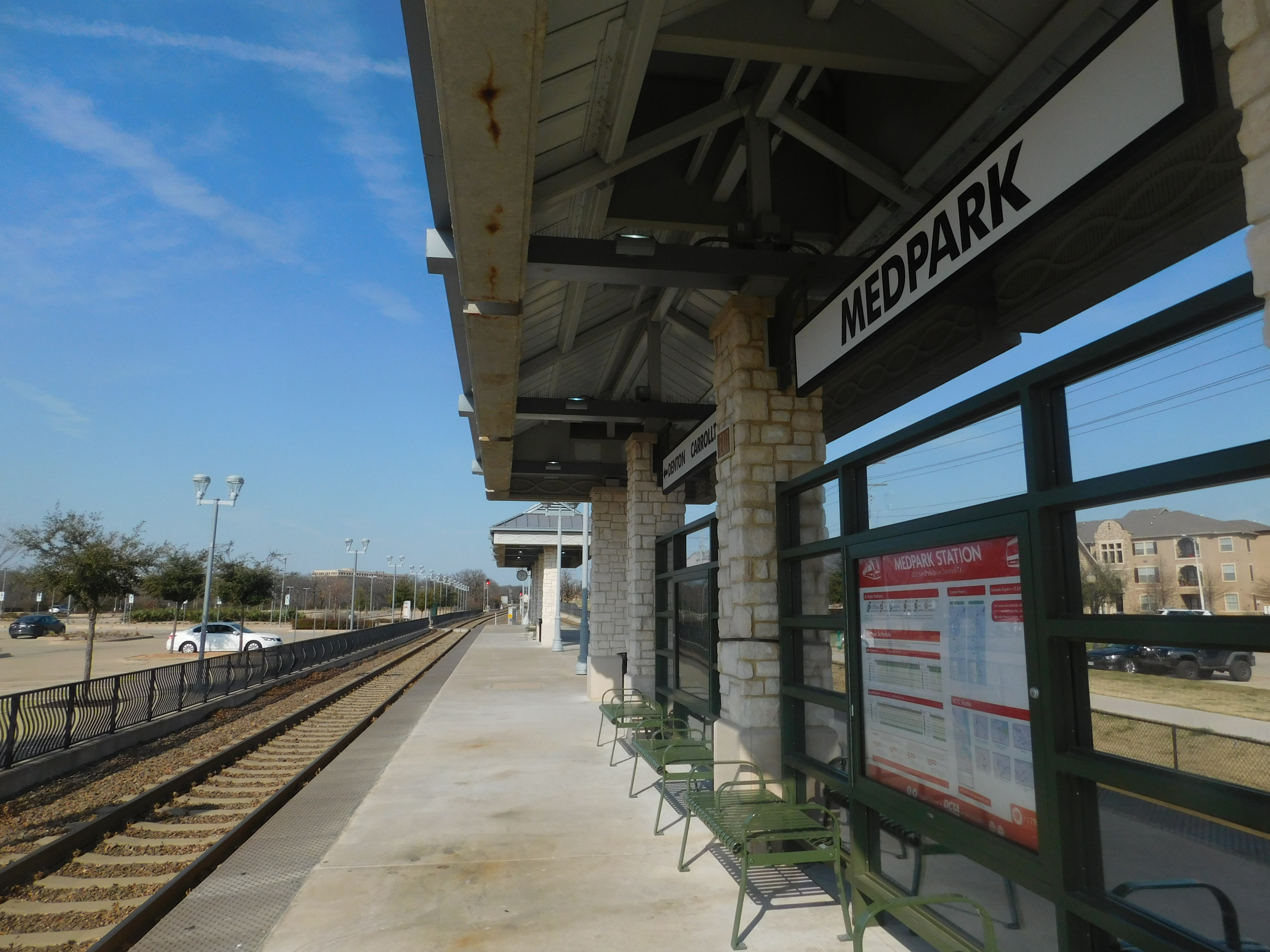
- The MedPark station in February 2017.

General information
- Location: 3220 MedPark Drive; Denton, Texas 76208
- Coordinates: 33°10′49″N 97°05′14″W
- Owner: Denton County Transportation Authority
- Line: A-train
- Platforms: 1 Island platform
- Tracks: 2
- Connections: DCTA UNT: CE 171; GoZone Denton

Construction
- Structure type: At-grade
- Parking: 723 spaces
- Accessible: Yes

History
- Opened: June 18, 2011

Services
Preceding station	DCTA	Following station
Downtown Denton Transit Center Terminus	A-train	Highland Village/Lewisville Lake toward Trinity Mills
Proposed services
Preceding station	DCTA	Following station
Downtown Denton Transit Center Terminus	A-train	Corinth toward Trinity Mills
Location

MedPark station is a A-train commuter rail station in southern Denton, Texas. The station is operated by the Denton County Transportation Authority (DCTA).

The station is approximately 1 mile (1.6 km) southeast of the intersection of Interstate 35E and Texas State Highway Loop 288. The station serves southern Denton, the Medical City Denton hospital, and Golden Triangle Mall. It also serves as a park-and-ride lot for commuters traveling to Downtown Denton and the University of North Texas campus.

On A-train maps and signage, the station is denoted by a red circle containing a first aid kit.

== History ==
DCTA obtained the 12.8-acre site on December 15, 2008 for $3.2 million. A groundbreaking ceremony was held on April 3, 2009; it was the second groundbreaking to be held for the A-train. However, preliminary tree-clearing at the site was temporarily halted in August due to a permitting issue.

In December 2009, due to ongoing negotiations with the City of Denton, DCTA announced that the northern segment of the line (consisting of MedPark and Downtown Denton Transit Center) may open a year later than the southern segment. Ultimately, this did not occur.

MedPark station, along with the rest of the A-train, opened on Saturday, June 18, 2011. The line's opening ceremony, dubbed the "Rock n' Rail Station Celebration," offered free rides on the train and live performances at all five DCTA-built stations, including MedPark. Revenue service began the following Monday.

On August 25, 2014, DCTA extended its Colorado Express shuttle to MedPark. This enabled University of North Texas students and faculty to park at MedPark and travel to the campus. On August 28, 2017, DCTA also established a fare-free zone on the A-train between MedPark and Downtown Denton Transit Center.

MedPark was previously a stop on two DCTA bus routes (Routes 2 and 4) and a shuttle to the Denton and Corinth campuses of North Central Texas College. The NCTC shuttle was eliminated in 2020 due to the COVID-19 pandemic, and the bus routes were eliminated in 2022 in favor of GoZone, a microtransit service. The station is still serviced by the Colorado Express shuttle.
