= 2011 in rail transport in the United States =

The following are events related to rail transportation in the United States that happened in 2011.

== Events ==
=== February ===
- (United States) 28 February – Wabtec announces that it has acquired Brush Traction, the English-based locomotive builder and maintainer, for US$31 million.

=== May ===
- 1 May – Tide Light Rail begins service in Norfolk, Virginia.

=== June ===
- 20 June – A-Train commuter rail service begins in northern Texas.

=== August ===
- 7 August – West Valley and Mid-Jordan extensions of TRAX open in the Salt Lake City, Utah, area.
