= Highland Village/Lewisville Lake station =

A-train commuter rail station in Lewisville, Texas

Highland Village Lewisville Lake
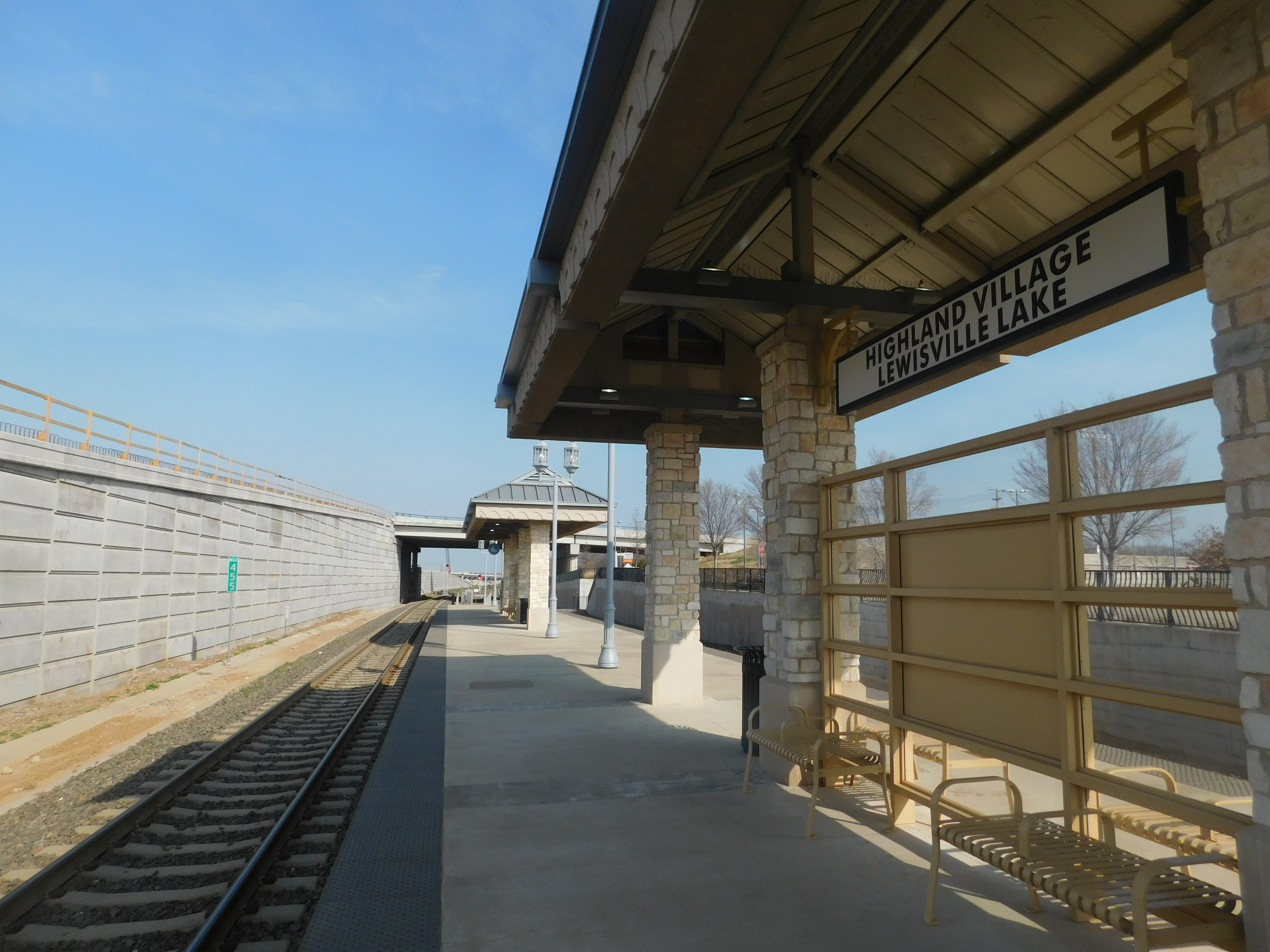
- The Highland Lake/Lewisville Village station in February 2017. A milepost sign for Interstate 35E is present on the left.

General information
- Location: 2998 N. Stemmons Freeway; Lewisville, Texas 75077
- Coordinates: 33°05′05″N 97°01′35″W
- Owner: Denton County Transportation Authority
- Line: A-train
- Platforms: 1 island platform
- Tracks: 2
- Connections: GoZone Lewisville/Highland Village

Construction
- Structure type: At-grade
- Parking: 138 spaces
- Accessible: Yes

History
- Opened: June 18, 2011

Services
Preceding station	DCTA	Following station
MedPark toward Downtown Denton Transit Center	A-train	Old Town toward Trinity Mills
Proposed services
Preceding station	DCTA	Following station
Corinth toward Downtown Denton Transit Center	A-train	Old Town toward Trinity Mills
Location

Highland Village/Lewisville Lake station is an A-train commuter rail station in Lewisville, Texas. It is operated by the Denton County Transportation Authority (DCTA).

The station, located east of Interstate 35E at Garden Ridge Boulevard, serves northern Lewisville, Highland Village, and the Lewisville Lake recreational area. It also serves as a park and ride lot for commuters from Flower Mound and the Lake Cities (Corinth, Hickory Creek, Lake Dallas, and Shady Shores).

On A-train maps and signage, the station is denoted by a blue circle containing a sailboat.

== History ==
Preliminary plans for the A-train referred to Highland Village/Lewisville Lake as "Garden Ridge" after the road connecting it to Highland Village. The name was changed to Highland Village/Lewisville Lake to emphasize its proximity to both locations.

DCTA obtained the land for the station on July 16, 2009, for a combined $2.7 million. A groundbreaking was held later that year on December 4.

The A-train's opening ceremony, dubbed the "Rock n' Rail Station Celebration", took place on June 18, 2011. Highland Village/Lewisville Lake hosted a ribbon-cutting performed by Highland Village mayor Scott McDearmont, which was followed by performances from local musical acts and local theatre troupe Studio B. The station entered revenue service the following Monday.

In 2012, in response to the station's parking lot regularly approaching capacity, DCTA proposed building additional parking underneath I-35E as part of a larger a road-widening project. This ultimately did not occur.

Plans for the A-train corridor included the A-train Rail Trail, a 19-mile (31 km) hiking and biking trail between Downtown Denton Transit Center and Hebron station. Highland Village/Lewisville Lake was connected to the trail in 2018 as the southern terminus of the trail's third phase. The final segment, which extended south from Highland Village/Lewisville Lake to downtown Lewisville, was later completed in December 2019.

== Service ==
Highland Village/Lewisville Lake is DCTA's primary service hub for Highland Village, which is on the opposite side of I-35E from the station. On April 4, 2016, DCTA established Highland Village Connect Shuttle, a circulator route for the city, which included a stop at the station. The route was eliminated in March 2020 in favor of a partnership with Lyft, which itself was replaced by a microtransit service the following year.

The station also served as a hub for two shuttle routes that serviced the Denton, Corinth, and Flower Mound campuses of North Central Texas College. Both routes were eliminated in 2020 due to the COVID-19 pandemic.
