= Highland Village, Texas =

Enclave city in Texas, United States

- City
- Location of Highland Village in Denton County, Texas
- Coordinates: 33°05′23″N 97°03′41″W
- Country: United States
- State: Texas
- County: Denton
- Municipal incorporation: February 14, 1963

Government
  - Type: Council-Manager
  - Honorable Mayor: Charlotte Wilcox
  - City manager: Paul Stevens
  - Councilmembers: Jon Kixmiller; Kevin Cox; Shawn Nelson; Rhonda Hurst; Robert Fiester (Deputy Mayor Pro Tem); Brian Fiorenza(Mayor Pro Tem)

Area
  - Total: 6.51 sq mi (16.87 km^{2})
  - Land: 5.53 sq mi (14.33 km^{2})
  - Water: 0.98 sq mi (2.54 km^{2})
- Elevation: 551 ft (168 m)

Population (2020)
  - Total: 15,899
  - Density: 3,013/sq mi (1,163.4/km^{2})
- Time zone: UTC-6 (Central (CST))
  - Summer (DST): UTC-5 (CDT)
- ZIP code: 75077
- Area code: 972
- FIPS code: 48-33848
- GNIS feature ID: 2410762
- Website: www.highlandvillage.org

Highland Village is a city in Denton County, Texas, United States. It is a suburb of Dallas and Fort Worth, located on the south side of the far western branch of Lewisville Lake. As of the 2020 United States census the city's population was 15,899.

== History ==
Highland Village incorporated as a city in February 1963. It included 516 residents in the 1970 census, but the opening of the Dallas/Fort Worth International Airport helped spur massive growth in the city's population: 3,246 in 1980, 7,027 in 1990, 12,173 in 2000, and 15,056 in 2010. The city remains a primarily residential area, though more business development is occurring.

== Geography ==
According to the United States Census Bureau, the city has a total area of 6.4 square miles (17 km^{2}), of which 0.9 square miles (2.3 km^{2}), or 13.88%, is covered by water.

The climate in this area is characterized by hot, humid summers and generally mild to cool winters. According to the Köppen climate classification, Highland Village has a humid subtropical climate, Cfa on climate maps.

== Demographics ==
Historical population
Census	Pop.	Note	%±
1970	516		—
1980	3,246		529.1%
1990	7,027		116.5%
2000	12,173		73.2%
2010	15,056		23.7%
2020	15,899		5.6%
2023 (est.)	16,100		1.3%
U.S. Decennial Census

=== 2020 census ===
As of the 2020 United States census, there were 15,899 people, 5,323 households, and 4,423 families residing in the city.

The median age was 44.5 years, 24.3% of residents were under the age of 18, and 15.9% of residents were 65 years of age or older; for every 100 females there were 97.9 males, and for every 100 females age 18 and over there were 95.1 males age 18 and over.

99.5% of residents lived in urban areas, while 0.5% lived in rural areas.

There were 5,323 households in Highland Village, of which 39.6% had children under the age of 18 living in them. Of all households, 77.1% were married-couple households, 7.3% were households with a male householder and no spouse or partner present, and 13.0% were households with a female householder and no spouse or partner present. About 10.9% of all households were made up of individuals and 5.8% had someone living alone who was 65 years of age or older.

There were 5,480 housing units, of which 2.9% were vacant. The homeowner vacancy rate was 1.0% and the rental vacancy rate was 11.7%.

Racial composition as of the 2020 census
Race	Number	Percent
White	12,890	81.1%
Black or African American	433	2.7%
American Indian and Alaska Native	68	0.4%
Asian	698	4.4%
Native Hawaiian and Other Pacific Islander	7	0.0%
Some other race	274	1.7%
Two or more races	1,529	9.6%
Hispanic or Latino (of any race)	1,560	9.8%

== Education ==
Highland Village is served by the Lewisville Independent School District, which has three elementary schools and one middle school located in the city. Edward S. Marcus High School, located in Flower Mound but near Highland Village, is the city's principal high school.

== Transportation ==
Highland Village voted to become a member of the Denton County Transportation Authority (DCTA) in September 2003. It is currently served with Commuter Express coach service to Denton and downtown Dallas. DCTA initiated bus service in Highland Village in January 2008. In 2011, Highland Village/Lewisville Lake station opened as a commuter rail station on DCTA's A-train.

In March 2020, DCTA replaced the Highland Village Connect Shuttle with a Lyft discount program to increase overall network efficiency. DCTA's on-demand GoZone service, which launched September 2021 in partnership with Via Transportation, ultimately replaced the Lyft program to provide transportation in Highland Village.

== Notable people ==
- Mason Cox, Professional Australian Rules footballer for Fremantle Dockers of the Australian Football League
- Hayley Orrantia, American actress, singer, songwriter. Portrays Erica Goldberg on ABC's The Goldbergs
- Paxton Pomykal, Professional Soccer Player for FC Dallas
