= Responsive Education Solutions =

Charter management organization

Coordinates: 33.025973°N 96.974879°W

Responsive Education Solutions, Inc.
- Formation: March 1999; 27 years ago
- Type: Nonprofit
- Tax ID no.: 75-2748762
- Headquarters: Lewisville, Texas
- Services: charter management organization
- Revenue: $142,618,209 (2015)
- Website: responsiveed.com

Responsive Education Solutions, Inc. (Responsive Ed) is a non-profit charter management organization headquartered in Lewisville, Texas, in the Dallas-Fort Worth area.

== General Information ==
Founded in 1998, ResponsiveEd started as a not-for-profit organization with 15 credit-recovery schools. These schools became known as Premier High Schools. In its first school year in 1999, ResponsiveEd had 50 staff members, about 700 students, and 65 graduates in the 1999-2000 school year.

ResponsiveEd has since developed a line of classical academies, STEM, early college high schools, and virtual school options. As of the 2018-2019 school year, ResponsiveEd serves 20,000 students with 2,400 team members at more than 70 campuses across Texas and Arkansas.

The ResponsiveEd family of schools includes:

- Premier High Schools—offers credit recovery and early graduation for students.
- Founders Classical Academies—offers classical education in the liberal arts and sciences.
- Ignite Community School—prepares students in educationally underserved communities for college success.
- iSchool High School—college-preparatory schools with an emphasis on community-specific academic pathways.
- iSchool Virtual Academy of Texas—offers a mastery-based curriculum in a college-preparatory program.
- Quest Collegiate Academy—provides a college preparatory, mastery-based, blended-learning education.
- TexasWorks—diploma and career certification program.

ResponsiveEd is the first charter school in Texas to address the unique needs of children with autism with The Foundation School for Autism in San Antonio.

== Operations ==
=== Teachers ===
Total teacher FTEs (full-time equivalent) employed by ResponsiveEd in 2016 was 732.5.

The average salary for teachers employed by ResponsiveEd in 2016 was $42,912; salaries ranged from a beginner’s salary of $41,667 to someone with 20+ years experience making $44,037.

Based on 2016-2017 data, 75.8% (Statewide: 74.5%) of ResponsiveEd teachers had a bachelor’s degree, 20.4% (Statewide: 23.6%) had a master’s degree, and 1.7% (Statewide: 0.6%) had a doctorate. The teacher demographics was 14.8% African American, 2.5% Asian, 10.5% Hispanic, 0.1% Pacific Islander, 0.1% American Indian, 71% White, and 1% two or more races.

=== Students ===
For the 2016-2017 school year, 32.9% of ResponsiveEd students were Hispanic, 47% were economically disadvantaged, 36.2% were at-risk students and 7.4% of ResponsiveEd students had special education needs. 53.8% (Statewide: 38.7%) of ResponsiveEd students were considered college-ready in English and Math for the Class of 2016. The average SAT score for the Class of 2016 was 1547 (Statewide: 1375) and the average ACT composite score was 23.0 (Statewide: 20.3).

== Financial ==
=== ResponsiveEd Foundation ===
The ResponsiveEd Foundation is a 501(c)(3) nonprofit supporting ResponsiveEd schools. The foundation was founded in an effort to expand the reach of ResponsiveEd schools.

In 2018, the ResponsiveEd Foundation won first prize on North Texas Giving Day for having the most donors make a contribution to the foundation. The contributions totaled more than $63,000 across 209 donors.

=== Bonds ===
Rather than relying on philanthropy to build or acquire new schools, ResponsiveEd employs a cycle of lease, grow, purchase, and expand to fuel its district growth.

According to 2015 data, ResponsiveEd has earned a Standards & Poor’s BBB rating, this is the highest given to any charter organization in Texas. In 2016, ResponsiveEd received the backing of Texas’ Permanent School Fund (PSF), providing the public school district with loan guarantees and leverages Texas’ AAA rating.

== Awards ==
In 2018, ResponsiveEd earned all possible distinctions in accountability ratings.

ResponsiveEd became the world’s first company to launch Google’s G-Suite Enterprise for Education in 2018.

ResponsiveEd co-founder and CEO, Chuck Cook, was named 2016 Texas Charter School Leader of the Year by the Texas Charter School Association (TCSA).

ResponsiveEd school, Northwest Arkansas Classical Academy, ranked third in the state of Arkansas based on its 2016 ACT Aspire Exam academic results. Academic rankings were compiled by the University of Arkansas for Education Policy for its Outstanding Educational Performance Awards.

== Controversy ==
Max Brantley of the Arkansas Times wrote that the Walton Foundation had given "significant support" to Responsive Ed.

In 2014 Zack Kopplin of Slate used an Open Records Request to obtain Responsive Ed's biology workbooks. According to Kopplin, the books "overtly and underhandedly discredit evidence-based science and allow creationism into public-school classrooms."

ResponsiveEd disputed the allegations, asserting that the biology materials were constitutionally acceptable as written. In response to the allegations, ResponsiveEd reviewed the workbook in question, "updating it in order to: (1) ensure that the evidence for evolution is presented in an objective and unbiased manner, and (2) avoid any misinterpretations that ResponsiveEd is endorsing—or disapproving of—religion.”
