= Old Town station (A-train) =

A-train commuter rail station in Lewisville, Texas

Old Town
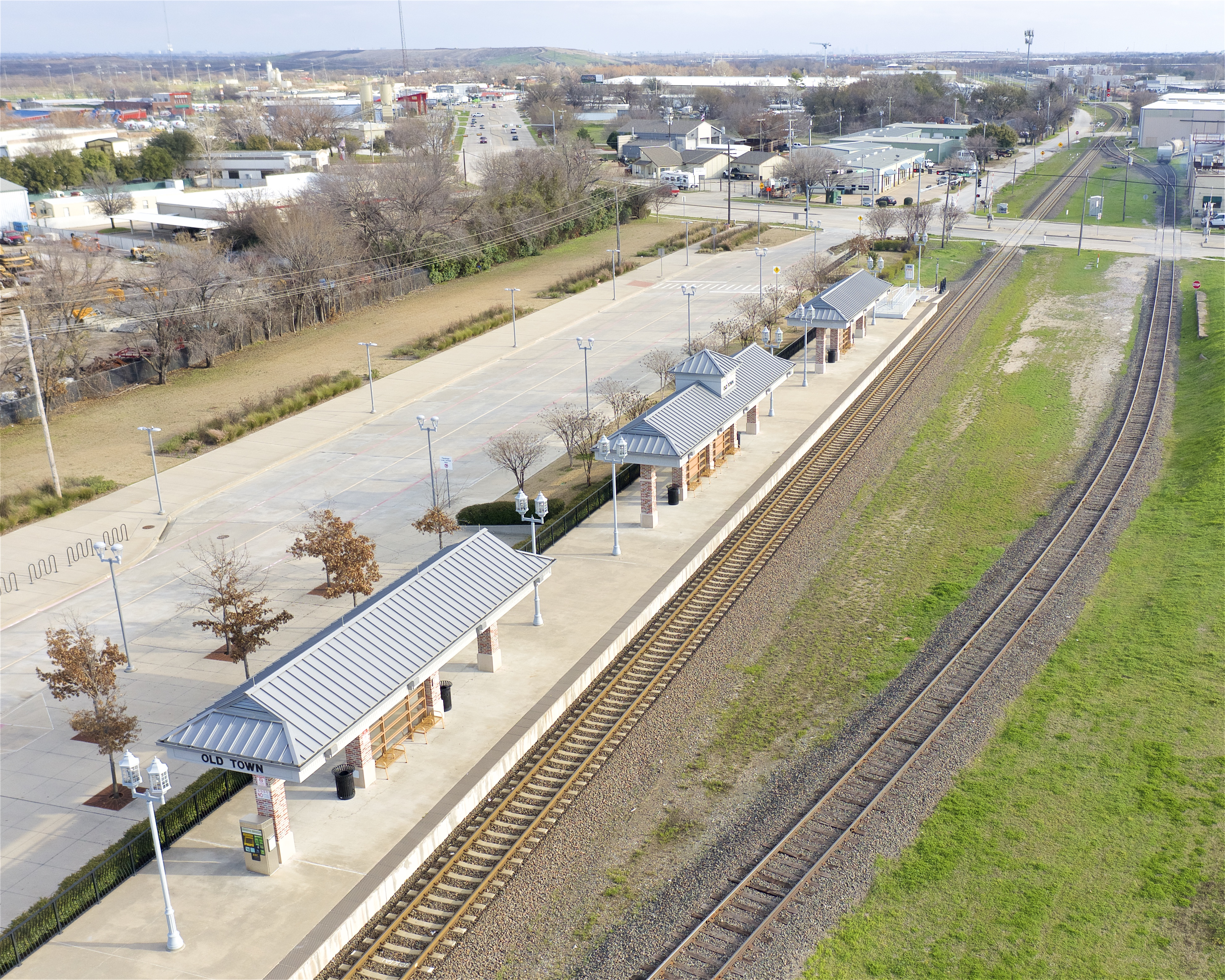

General information
- Location: 617 E. Main Street; Lewisville, Texas 75057
- Coordinates: 33°02′50″N 96°59′11″W
- Owner: Denton County Transportation Authority
- Line: A-train
- Platforms: 1 side platform
- Tracks: 1
- Connections: GoZone Lewisville/Highland Village

Construction
- Structure type: At-grade
- Parking: 169 spaces
- Accessible: Yes

History
- Opened: June 18, 2011

Services
Preceding station	DCTA	Following station
Highland Village/Lewisville Lake toward Downtown Denton Transit Center	A-train	Hebron toward Trinity Mills
Location

Charles Emery Old Town Station (typically shortened to Old Town) is an A-train commuter rail station in Lewisville, Texas. The station is named for Old Town Lewisville, the city's historic downtown district, which it is 0.5 miles (0.80 km) east of.

On A-train maps and signage, the station is denoted by an orange circle containing a pinwheel star.

== History ==
A groundbreaking ceremony was held for the station on September 26, 2009 during the city's Western Days Festival.

In 2010, the city of Lewisville created the Old Town Transit-Oriented Development Master Plan to organize and promote development around the station and greater Old Town Lewisville area. The plan was later revised in 2017 and 2023.

The A-train's opening ceremony, dubbed the "Rock n' Rail Station Celebration", took place on June 18, 2011. The ceremony saw local musical acts playing at all five DCTA-built stations, including Old Town. The station entered revenue service the following Monday.

In 2015, DCTA broke ground on the southern segment of the Lewisville Hike and Bike Trail, which opened the following year. The trail segment runs from Hebron station to Mills Street, passing Old Town station.

In 2019, the station was formally renamed in honor of Charles Emery, a former chairman of DCTA and member of the Lewisville City Council. A placard commemorating him and his wife, Elaine, was installed at the station.

In 2025, DCTA and Lewisville unveiled plans for a transit-oriented development at Old Town station that would include office space, retail, and a new headquarters for the DCTA.

== Service ==
Old Town station is located approximately 0.9 miles (1.4 km) north of the DCTA Rail Operations and Maintenance facility. Because of this, northbound trains entering into service will start at Old Town instead of Trinity Mills.

The station was originally the northern terminus of bus route 22, which serviced southwestern Lewisville and Hebron station. On December 7, 2021, the route was eliminated in favor of GoZone, an on-demand service.
