= A-train (Texas) =

Hybrid rail service in Denton County, Texas

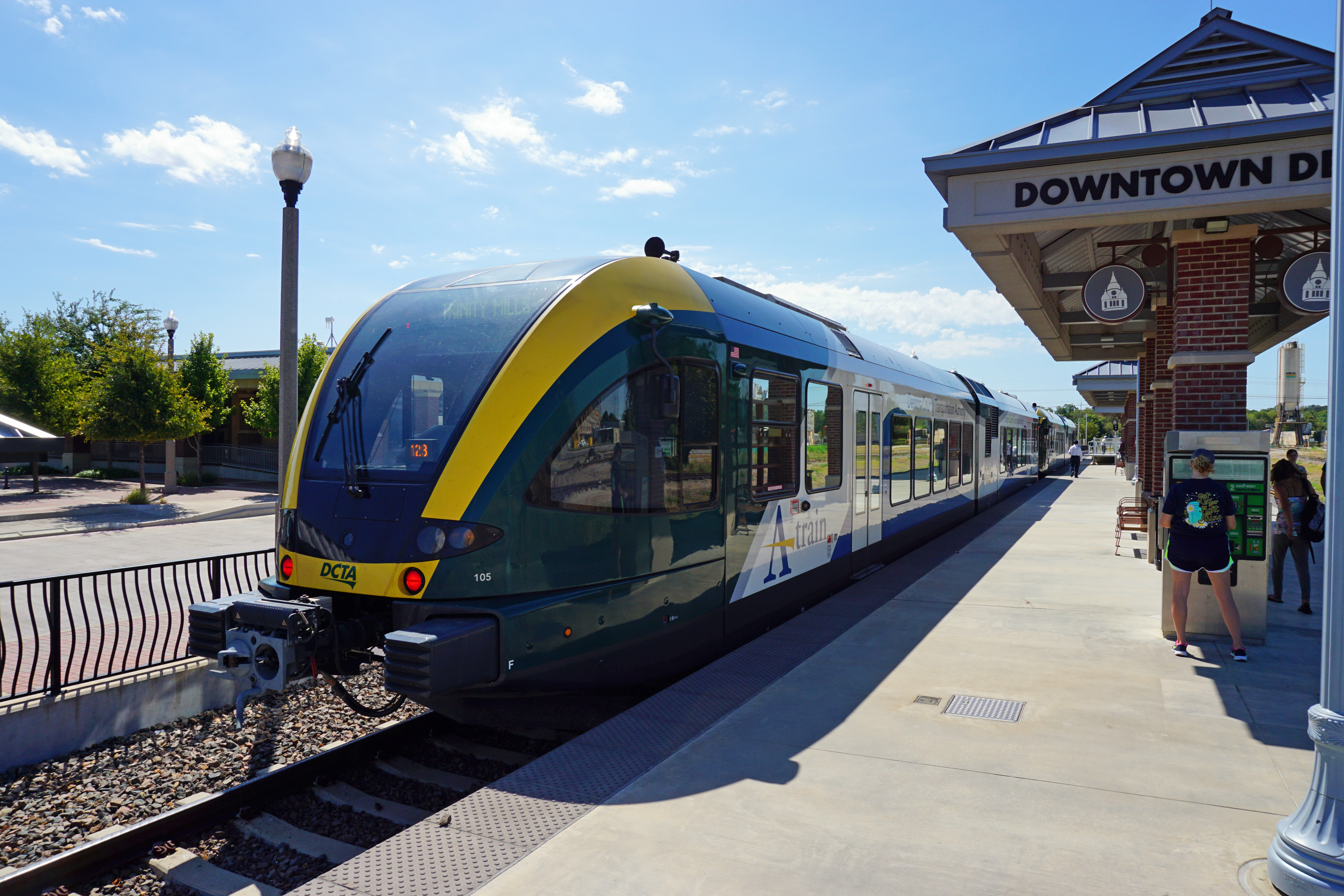
- A-train diesel multiple unit train at the Downtown Denton Transit Center

Overview
- Owner: Denton County Transportation Authority
- Locale: Denton County, Texas
- Termini: Downtown Denton Transit Center; Trinity Mills station
- Stations: 6
- Website: dcta.net/a-train

Service
- Type: Hybrid rail
- System: Denton County Transportation Authority (DCTA)
- Operator(s): Rio Grande Pacific (operations); Stadler US (rolling stock maintenance)
- Rolling stock: 11 Stadler GTW 2/6
- Daily ridership: 1,000 (weekdays, Q2 2026)
- Ridership: 277,300 (2025)

History
- Opened: June 20, 2011

Technical
- Line length: 21 mi (33.80 km)
- Track gauge: 4 ft 8 1/2 in (1,435 mm) standard gauge
- Operating speed: 60 mph (97 km/h)
Route map
A-train highlighted in yellow

The A-train is a hybrid rail service in Denton County, Texas, United States. The line is operated by Rio Grande Pacific under contract to the Denton County Transportation Authority (DCTA) on a rail line leased from Dallas Area Rapid Transit (DART).

The 21-mile (34 km) line runs parallel to Interstate 35E between Denton and Carrollton. It acts as an extension of the DART rail system's Green Line, which connects Carrollton to Dallas Love Field, Downtown Dallas, and Fair Park. The line opened on June 20, 2011.

In 2025, the line had a ridership of 277,300, or about 1,000 per weekday as of the second quarter of 2026. It is the fourth-busiest commuter rail line in Texas and the twenty-ninth busiest in the United States.

== History ==
The right of way was established by the Missouri–Kansas–Texas Railroad, later known as the Katy. Eight miles (13 km) of the disused line was purchased by the city of Denton in 1993, with a rail trail opening in 2001.

A formal Alternatives Analysis study conducted in 2004–2005, which included extensive community and citizen involvement, identified the proposed rail line as the best and most cost-effective mobility solution for Denton County and the region. It cited the impacts of projected population growth, growing safety, traffic congestion and air quality concerns, as well as the need to improve access to Denton County's vital health care facilities and three major college and university campuses.

In May 2005, the DCTA Board of Directors approved the study's recommendation to construct the rail alignment on east side of I-35E using an existing railroad corridor. DART, who owned the southern portion of the Katy corridor in Denton County, exercised the option to re-purchase the northern portion from the city of Denton and re-activate the rail line for the A-Train. In 2010, DCTA formalized a 20-year lease agreement with DART to use the line for A-Train service.

To ensure the line would open in time to connect with the under-construction DART Green Line, the A-Train was primarily funded by the Regional Transportation Council, who approved the funding in August 2008. As a result, federal funds were not used in the construction of the rail link.

The A-train name, station names, and station locations were publicly revealed in September 2008. DCTA's then-director of transportation services, Dee Leggett, stated that the A-train name "represent[s] Denton's position as the apex of the Dallas/Fort Worth region."

On April 4, 2011, the DCTA began tests of railcars, communications systems and signals on track between Carrollton and Lewisville Lake, with tests on the remainder of the route projected to begin later in the month, though this date was later pushed back to mid-May.

The A-train was opened on June 20, 2011, with celebrations at five train stations.

=== Operators ===
On July 20, 2016, First Transit (the American subsidiary of British transportation operator FirstGroup) signed an agreement with DCTA to operate the A-train starting from October of that year. First had already been the operator for DCTA's bus service since 2007. The contract would last nine years with a five-year extension option. Local rail operator Rio Grande Pacific was also contracted to provide signaling, dispatching, and track maintenance.

On November 3, 2020, Rio Grande Pacific assumed the operations of the A-train for the remainder of the contract and partnered with Stadler US for the maintenance of rolling stock.

=== Future ===
The North Central Texas Council of Governments Mobility 2045 plan calls for the A-train to be extended south to interchange with the DART Silver Line. As of June 2025, DCTA is in discussions with DART to extend the A-train to Downtown Carrollton in an agreement which previously included a joint rail facility for the DART Silver Line.

In addition to the Downtown Carrollton extension, there are plans to create an infill station to serve Corinth, a non-member city between Denton and Highland Village. However, Corinth would have to vote to join DCTA before the station would be built; as of 2026 there are no plans for such an election.

== Operation ==
=== Fares ===
Fares are fully integrated with the rest of the DCTA system, with single rides costing $1.50. Two free transit zones exist on the system: between Downtown Denton Transit Center and MedPark, as well as Hebron Station to Trinity Mills.

=== Services ===
Since September 7, 2021, the A-train operates with a 30 minute headway during rush hours and interpeak every weekday, while on Saturdays the service runs every 60 minutes. There is no service on Sundays and major holidays. Interchanges with the DART Green Line are irregularly timed.

=== Stations ===
All stations have a park and ride lot and are fully accessible.

Station	Address	Municipality	Points of interest and connections
Downtown Denton Transit Center	604 E. Hickory Street	Denton	Historic downtown Denton; Connect Bus: 3, 6, 7 GoZone: Denton
MedPark	3220 MedPark Drive	Denton	Medical City Denton; UNT Campus Shuttle: CE 171; GoZone: Denton
Highland Village/Lewisville Lake	2998 N. Stemmons Freeway	Lewisville	City of Highland Village; Lewisville Lake recreational area GoZone: Lewisville/Highland Village
Old Town	617 E. Main Street	Lewisville	Historic downtown Lewisville; GoZone: Lewisville/Highland Village
Hebron	952 Lakeside Circle	Lewisville	GoZone: Lewisville/Highland Village
Trinity Mills	2525 Blanton Drive	Carrollton	DART Bus: 232; GoLink: Keller Springs

=== Rolling stock ===
DCTA placed an order for 11 Stadler GTW 2/6 DMUs in 2010. The first of the new trains were delivered in late 2011 for testing prior to their entry into service. The full order was fulfilled by August 2012, and in September 2012 the new units replaced the Budd DMUs leased from TRE. The line uses diesel-electric hybrid motive power.

Class	Image	Type	Top speed		Inventory	Unit Numbers	Built
Class	Image	Type	mph	km/h	Inventory	Unit Numbers	Built
Stadler GTW 2/6		Diesel Multiple Unit	60	100	11	101-111	2010–2012

The A-Train began operations using 10 Budd RDC-1s leased from Trinity Railway Express, which were used until DCTA's own purpose-built fleet was delivered.

== See also ==
- Texas Interurban Railway – operated commuter service from 1924 to 1932 on the Missouri–Kansas–Texas right-of-way used by the A-train
