= North Central Texas Council of Governments =

- Logo

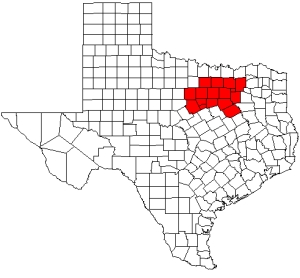
- Map of Texas highlighting counties served by the North Central Texas Council of Governments
- Formation: January 1966
- Type: Voluntary association of governments
- Region served: 12,800 sq mi (33,000 km^{2})
- Members: 16 counties

Historical population
Year	Pop.	±%
2000	5,309,277	—
2010	6,539,950	+23.2%
2020	7,831,768	+19.8%

The North Central Texas Council of Governments or NCTCOG is a voluntary association of governments in the Dallas/Fort Worth metroplex.

As of 2023 its ranks currently include 16 counties, 169 cities, towns, and villages, 19 school districts, and 24 special districts. Based in Arlington, NCTCOG is a member of the Texas Association of Regional Councils and the Texas Association of Metropolitan Planning Organizations.

== Purpose ==
The purpose of NCTCOG is to "strengthen both the individual and collective power of local governments and to help them recognize regional opportunities, eliminate unnecessary duplication, and make joint decisions." Although it is considered a political subdivision of Texas, it has no regulatory or taxing authority, and political subdivisions (counties, cities, and other special districts) are not required to become members.

== Organization ==
Each member government appoints a representative from its governing body to the COG General Assembly. This group meets annually to elect the Executive Board, a policy-making body for all NCTCOG activities composed of 18 officials. The activities organized include regional plans, program activities and decisions, and fiscal and budgetary policies. Within NCTCOG are technical, study, and policy development committees and a professional staff headed by Mike Eastland (the Executive Director) that support the Board.

== Counties served ==
- Collin
- Dallas
- Denton
- Ellis
- Erath
- Hood
- Hunt
- Johnson
- Kaufman
- Navarro
- Palo Pinto
- Parker
- Rockwall
- Somervell
- Tarrant
- Wise

== Largest cities in the region ==
=== Major cities ===
City	2010 Population	2020 Population
Dallas	1,197,816	1,304,379
Fort Worth	741,205	918,915
Arlington	365,348	394,266
Plano	259,842	285,494
Irving	216,291	256,684

=== Cities and towns 100k-250k ===
City/Town	2010 Population	2020 Population
Garland	226,875	246,018
Frisco	116,989	200,509
Grand Prairie	175,397	196,100
McKinney	131,117	195,308
Mesquite	139,824	150,108
Denton	113,383	139,869
Carrollton	119,097	133,434
Richardson	99,224	119,469
Lewisville	95,291	111,822
Allen	84,246	104,627

=== Cities and towns 25k-99k ===
City /Town	2010 Population	2020 Population
Flower Mound	64,669	75,956
Mansfield	56,368	72,602
North Richland Hills	63,343	69,917
Rowlett	56,199	62,535
Euless	51,276	61,032
Wylie	41,427	57,526
DeSoto	49,047	56,145
Grapevine	46,334	50,631
Bedford	46,978	49,928
Cedar Hill	45,027	49,148
Burleson	36,689	47,641
Rockwall	37,491	47,251
Little Elm	25,898	46,453
Haltom City	42,409	46,073
Keller	39,626	45,776
The Colony	36,328	44,534
Coppell	38,660	42,983
Lancaster	36,361	41,275
Waxahachie	29,621	41,140
Duncanville	38,524	40,706
Hurst	37,338	40,413
Farmers Branch	28,615	35,991
Midlothian	18,037	35,125
Cleburne	29,337	31,352
Southlake	26,575	31,265
Weatherford	25,250	30,854
Prosper	9,423	30,174
Greenville	25,557	28,164
Corsicana	23,770	25,109
