= Denton County Transportation Authority =

Transit agency in Denton County, Texas

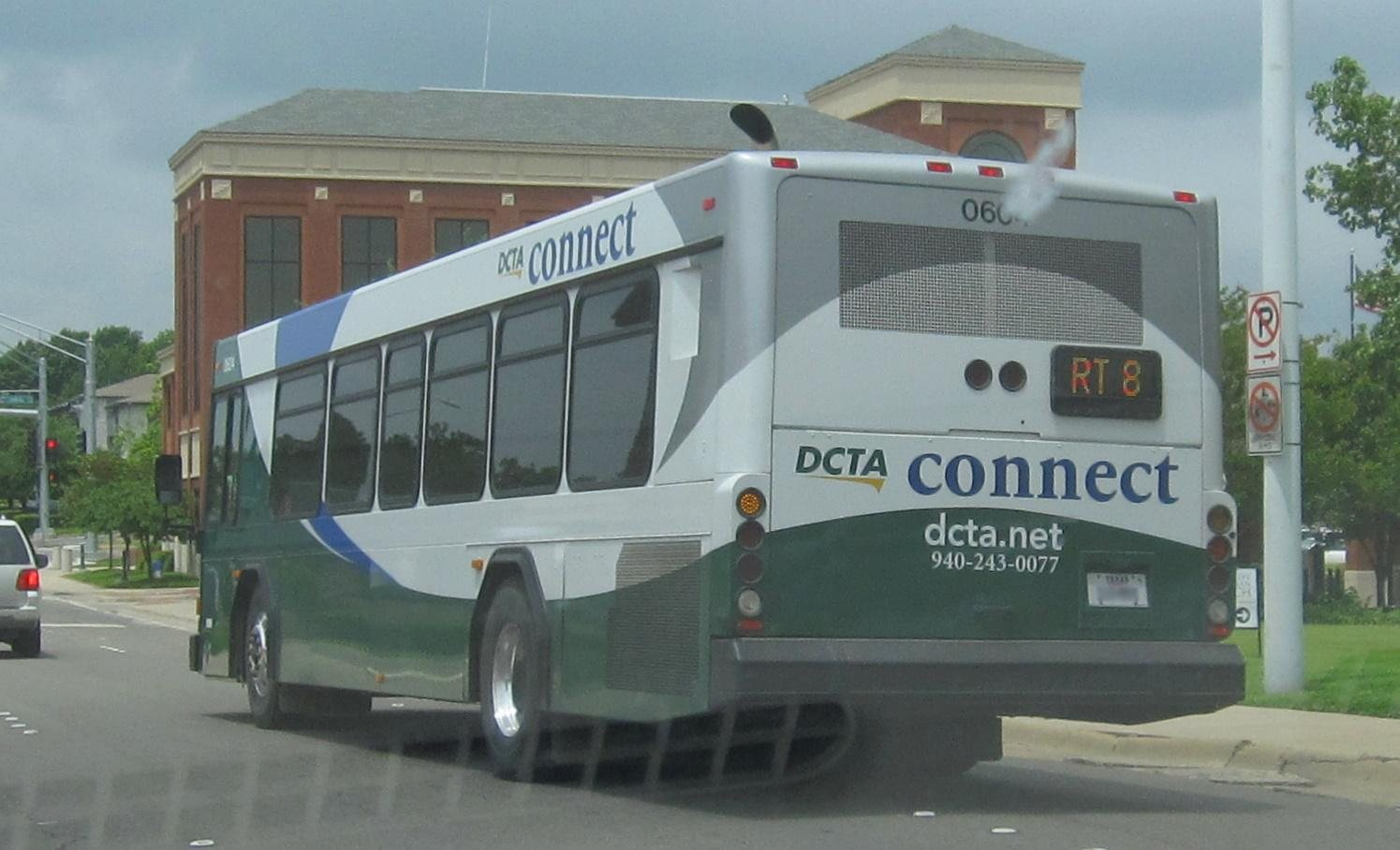
- Denton County Transportation Authority's Connect shuttle
- Founded: 2002
- Headquarters: 1955 Lakeway Drive #260; Lewisville, Texas
- Service area: Denton, Highland Village, Lewisville
- Service type: Bus, Demand Response, Commuter Rail
- Routes: 12 UNT, 3 Denton, 1 Regional
- Daily ridership: 7,700 (weekdays, Q2 2026)
- Annual ridership: 2,847,500 (2025)
- Fuel type: Primarily diesel
- Chief executive: Paul Cristina
- Website: dcta.net

The Denton County Transportation Authority (DCTA) is the transit authority that operates in Denton County, Texas. It operates transit service in three cities within Denton County, as well as the A-train, a regional commuter rail line to Carrollton. In 2025, the system had a ridership of 2,847,500, or about 7,700 per weekday as of the second quarter of 2026.

== History ==
In 2001, Texas House Bill 3323 created Chapter 460 of the Texas Transportation Code, which authorized the creation of Coordinated County Transportation Authorities (CCTAs) by county commissions, subject to a vote by the county population. In accordance with the code, on November 5, 2002, the voters in Denton County approved the creation of DCTA, with 73% in favor. DCTA is the first, and so far only, CCTA in the state of Texas.

In 2006, DCTA absorbed LINK, the mass transit service operated by the City of Denton since 2002. LINK's bus routes were absorbed into DCTA's local Denton services (now called Connect). Paratransit services in the three member cities were also absorbed and renamed DCTA Access. Neither Lewisville nor Highland Village (the other current members of DCTA) operated bus lines prior to DCTA's formation.

== Member cities ==
The following cities voted to join DCTA and levy a 1/2¢ sales tax to finance the system on September 13, 2003:

- Denton
- Highland Village
- Lewisville

The following cities also participated in the September 2003 election but declined to join:

- Copper Canyon
- Corinth
- Double Oak
- Flower Mound
- Shady Shores

No other cities have joined DCTA since its inception, and none of the original cities have elected to withdraw.

== Board of directors ==
Texas Transportation Code Chapter 460 governs the DCTA board.

DCTA is governed by a five-member board appointed by respective entities: one member appointed by each of the "founding municipalities" (Denton, Highland Village, and Lewisville) and two members appointed by the Denton County Commissioners Court from areas other than the founding municipalities. Each party (the cities and the county) may also appoint an alternate member to preside in the absence of a voting member; the member can attend and participate in all meetings (except closed and executive sessions) but cannot vote and is not counted toward a quorum. A DCTA board member must reside either within DCTA's territory, or outside it but within a city which is partly located within DCTA's territory.

All members serve two-year terms. Board members must have professional experience in the field of transportation, business, government, engineering or law. In accordance with DCTA By-laws, the Board adopts the annual operating budget and is responsible for setting policy. The president oversees the day-to-day operations of the DCTA and implements policies set forth by the Board.

== Transportation services ==
The Denton County Transportation Authority offers several services to the general public in and around Denton, Lewisville, and Highland Village. These services include fixed-route service in Denton, an on-demand service in Highland Village and Lewisville, shuttle routes serving UNT, a regional commuter bus service connecting Denton and downtown Fort Worth, and a train service connecting Denton and Lewisville with neighboring Carrollton (linking to DART light-rail service). Additionally, DCTA offers paratransit service throughout its service area.

=== Connect Bus ===
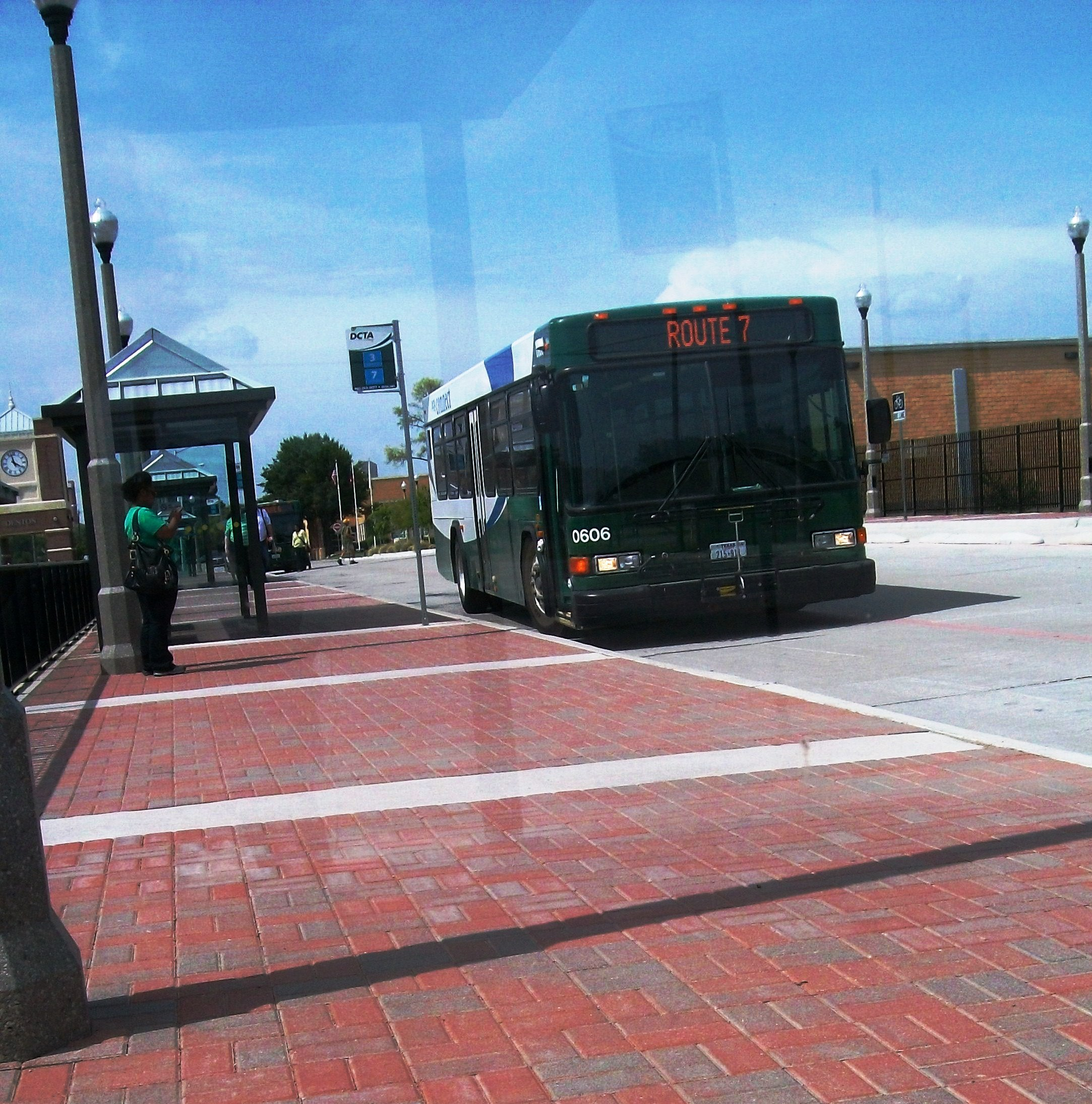
Connect bus at Downtown Denton Transit Center

DCTA Connect is a fixed-route bus service operating within the city of Denton. The current system consists of three routes, all of which use Downtown Denton Transit Center as a shared hub. Buses operate Monday through Saturday.

Route	Headway (min.)		Route Description
Route	Weekday	Saturday	Route Description
3	20	45	East from DDTC to Loop 288 and Billy Ryan High School, passing city hall and the county courthouse
6	20	40	North from DDTC to UNT Discovery Park, passing Quakertown Park and Texas Woman's University
7	20	45	West from DDTC to Texas Health Presbyterian through downtown Denton, passing the University of North Texas

DCTA Connect originally had ten routes (eight in Denton and two in Lewisville), but most were discontinued in 2021 and 2022 in favor of GoZone service.

==== University Routes ====
DCTA operates the University of North Texas shuttle system, which as of November 2026 consists of eight routes. Most routes are only available during weekdays. UNT students, faculty, and staff can ride at no cost with their ID, while other riders can use standard DCTA fare.

DCTA does not currently operate shuttles for Texas Woman's University or NCTC Denton, but both institutions are serviced by Connect buses (routes 6 and 7, respectively). Like with UNT, discounted passes are available to students, faculty, and staff.

==== North Texas Xpress ====
Operated in partnership with Trinity Metro, North Texas Xpress is a twice-daily weekday bus that travels between downtown Denton and the North Park and Ride in Alliance using Interstate 35W. Riders can travel further to downtown Fort Worth using Trinity Metro's North Park and Ride Xpress (Route 63X).

=== A-train ===
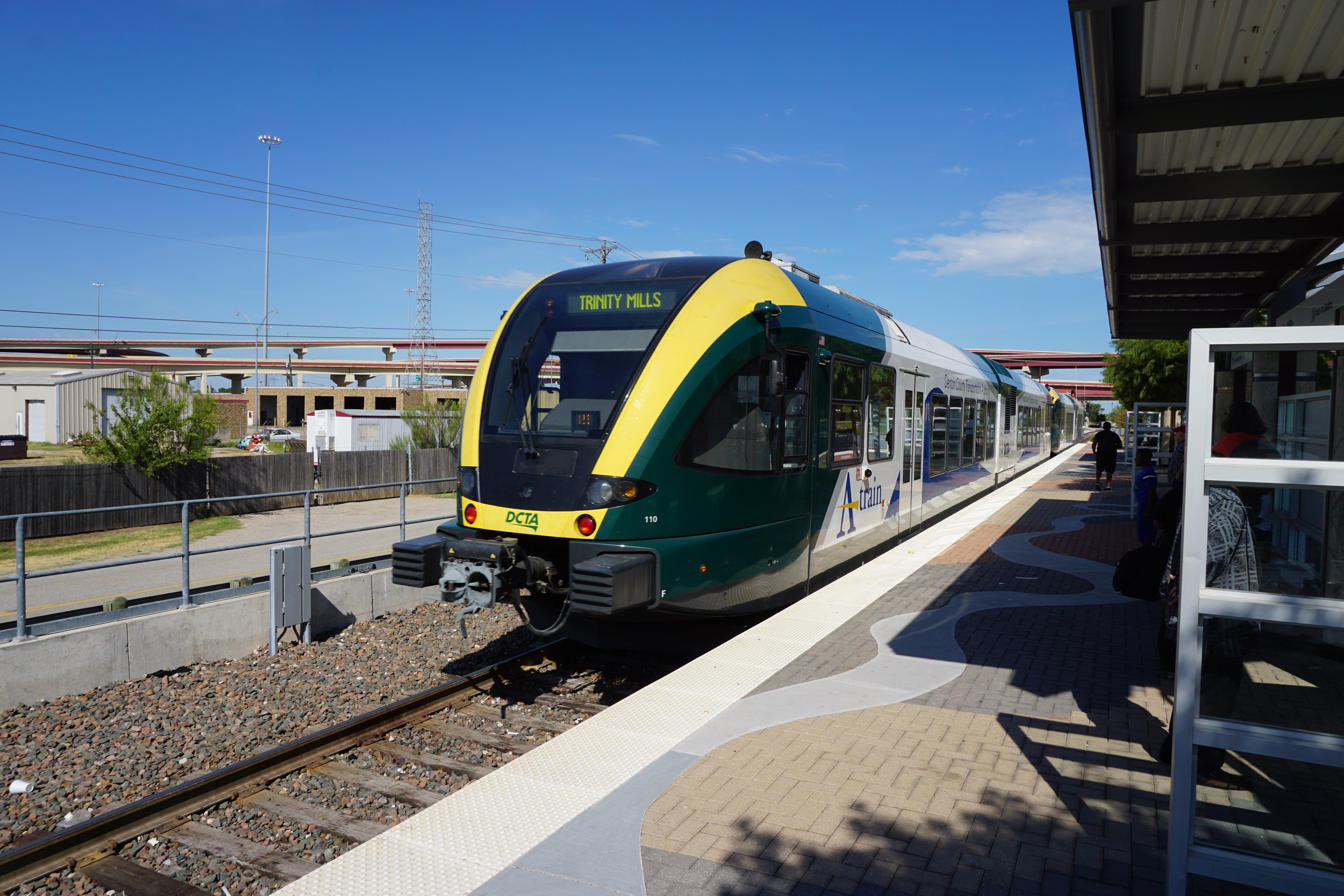
The A-train at Trinity Mills Station in 2015

DCTA operates the A-train, a regional commuter rail line connecting Carrollton and Denton, to meet growing transportation demands in eastern Denton County. The 21-mile rail line parallels Interstate 35E and meets the Dallas Area Rapid Transit Green Line at Trinity Mills Station in Carrollton.

It has six stations (two in Denton, three in Lewisville, and one in Carrollton) and opened June 20, 2011.

=== GoZone ===
GoZone is a microtransit service operated in partnership with Via Transportation. The service allows passengers to schedule curb-to-curb on-demand trips by van. Service is divided into three zones: Denton, Lewisville/Highland Village. Travel between zones is permitted on Sundays and holidays, and travel to either zone from DART's Trinity Mills station is available for four hours after A-train service ends.

GoZone has a $1.50 base fare, though the Denton zone adds a 50¢-per-mile surcharge for trips over four miles. GoZone service is not included in multi-ride passes.

The service was established in September 2021 to increase DCTA's network coverage, and it replaced most of DCTA's bus routes by 2022. In 2024, to reduce GoZone service in Denton, DCTA introduced restrictions on GoZone service near its remaining bus routes.

==== GoZone Frisco ====
In 2026, DCTA began providing pilot GoZone service to the city of Frisco. Frisco GoZone operates in a 21-square-mile (54 km^{2}) zone, which covers approximately one-third of the city, as well as DART's Northwest Plano Park & Ride to allow for bus transfers. The service has a $3 base fare with a 50¢ surcharge for each additional 1 1/2 miles (2.4 km).

=== Access (Paratransit) ===
DCTA Access offers ADA-compliant paratransit service to people with physical, cognitive, or visual disabilities who are incapable of utilizing Connect Bus service. This service allows curb-to-curb trips to be scheduled (at least one day in advance) so long as both the start and end of the trip are within 3/4 miles of a Connect Bus route. ADA paratransit in Denton County outside of DCTA Access's service area is provided by the nonprofit Special Programs for Aging Needs (SPAN).

DCTA Access also offers a non-ADA demand-response service for residents of Lewisville, Highland Village, and Denton that are disabled or elderly (65 years and older). These trips can start and end anywhere within these three cities, but they are provided on a first-come, first-serve basis and are subject to capacity constraints.

In neighboring Collin County, DCTA operates two other non-ADA paratransit services for elderly or disabled residents. Frisco Demand-Response services Frisco and parts of Plano (including the Medical City Plano hospital), while Collin County Rides services Allen and Fairview.

== Ridership ==
DCTA ridership fluctuates greatly with the academic calendar, as a considerable portion of passengers are UNT and TWU students, faculty, and staff. Bus ridership greatly exceeds rail ridership, primarily driven by university students. For 2020, the agency reported 1.36 million bus trips alongside 221,316 rail trips. Like many transit agencies across the world, DCTA's ridership was greatly impacted by the effects of the COVID-19 pandemic. Ridership in 2019 was 2.4 million bus trips and 393,400 rail trips, for comparison.

== See also ==
- Special Programs for Aging Needs (SPAN)
- North Central Texas Council of Governments (NCTCOG)
- Dallas Area Rapid Transit (DART)
- Trinity Metro
