= The Colony High School =

Location
- 4301 Blair Oaks Road; The Colony, Texas 75056-2718; United States; 33°4′27″N 96°53′14″W

Information
- School type: Public high school
- Motto: We Believe We Can Achieve and We Will Succeed!
- Established: 1986
- School district: Lewisville Independent School District
- Principal: Dr. Tim Baxter
- Teaching staff: 144.29 (FTE)
- Grades: 9–12
- Enrollment: 1,803 (2024–2025)
- Student to teacher ratio: 12.50
- Colors: Black & Gold
- Athletics conference: UIL Class 5A
- Mascot: Cougars/Lady Cougars
- Newspaper: The Paw Print
- Yearbook: Track of the Cat
- Website: The Colony High School

The Colony High School (TCHS) is a public high school located in the city of The Colony, Texas, US, and classified as a 5A school by the UIL. It is a part of the Lewisville Independent School District located in southeastern Denton County. In 2015, the school was rated "Met Standard" by the Texas Education Agency.

== History ==
The Colony High School, located in The Colony, which opened in 1986 is part of Lewisville ISD. Seniors of the 1987 class attended Lewisville High School as TCHS initially had only grades 9–11.

== Academics ==
The Colony High School offers a standard Texas high school curriculum as defined by the Texas State graduation requirements. In addition to those minimum requirements, The Colony High School also offers numerous College Board Advanced Placement (AP) courses that gives students the opportunity to qualify for college credit. Also a new addition to The Colony High School's academic help for the students is a program nationally known as AVID; Advancement Via Individual Determination which is a class for students who want to get into college. The class teaches them ways to take college level notes, self-discipline necessary for getting work done in college while giving them the opportunity to meet professionals in the field and allowing the students to go on field trips to college campuses. TCHS was the first high school in LISD to have the AVID program. Recently, all LISD schools, including The Colony High School, entered into a partnership with local community colleges to offer students dual-credit summer courses that, if passed, qualifies as credit for both high school graduation and college. In 2008/09 a new band hall, drum room, color guard room, and practice rooms were added.

== Facilities ==
By 2013 the school established a coffee and light meal shop.

== Athletics ==
The Colony Cougars compete in these sports:

Volleyball, Cross Country, Football, Basketball, Powerlifting, Wrestling, Swimming, Soccer, Golf, Tennis, Track, Cheerleading, Dance, Baseball & Softball

=== State titles ===
- Girls Soccer
  - 2007(4A)
- Theatre - UIL One Act Play State Champions
  - 2015 - "The Lost Boy"
  - 2016 - 2nd Place - "In The Hands of its Enemy"
  - 2017 - "Second Samuel"
  - 2022 - 2nd Place - "The Old Man and The Old Moon"
  - 2023 - 4th Place - "The Lost Boy"
- Softball
  - 2017(5A)

== Feeder patterns ==
Elementary schools that feed into The Colony include

- Camey
- Ethridge
- Morningside
- B.B. Owen- retired 2025
- Peter's Colony
- Memorial
- Stewart's Creek (retired 2020-2021)

Middle schools that feed into The Colony include:

- Griffin
- Lakeview

== Notable alumni ==
- Don Callis (born 2001), Canadian Football League defensive back
- Jayda Coleman (born 2001), softball player
- Christian Gonzalez (born 2002), NFL football cornerback
- Zach LeDay (born 1994), power forward in the Israeli Basketball Premier League
- Myles Price (born 2001), NFL football wide receiver
- Dominic Rains, actor
- Ethan Rains, actor
- Deron Williams (born 1984), former NBA basketball point guard
- Mike Williams (born 1980), former NFL football player
- Bracey Wright (born 1984), former NBA basketball guard

== See also ==
- Lewisville Independent School District
- Edward S. Marcus High School
- Flower Mound High School
- Hebron High School
- Lewisville High School
