= Hebron High School (Texas) =

High school in Carrollton, Texas

Coordinates: 33°2′8.4″N 96°51′30″W

Location
- 4207 Plano Parkway; Carrollton, Texas 75010; United States

Information
- School type: Public high school
- Motto: "Nothing Less Than Success.”
- Established: 1999
- School district: Lewisville Independent School District
- CEEB code: 441146
- Principal: Amy Boughton
- Teaching staff: 218.87 (FTE)
- Grades: 9–12
- Enrollment: 3,668 (2025–2026)
- Student to teacher ratio: 16.76
- Campus type: Suburban
- Colors: Black, silver, and royal blue
- Athletics conference: UIL Class 6A
- Mascot: Hawk
- Newspaper: The Hawk Eye
- Yearbook: Talon
- Website: http://hhs.lisd.net

Hebron High School (HHS) is one of five public high schools in the Lewisville Independent School District and is located in Carrollton, Texas. The school opened in 1999 and was the fourth high school to do so in its district. It services communities from far west Plano, southwest Frisco, small portions of far east The Colony, far north Carrollton, and far southeast Lewisville. Hebron serves grades nine through twelve; ninth graders attend the adjacent Hebron High School 9th Grade Campus. In 2015, the school was rated “Met Standard” by the Texas Education Agency. Hebron is currently classified as a 6A school by the University Interscholastic League.

== Demographics ==
The demographic breakdown of the 3,668 students enrolled for the 2025-2026 school year was:

- Male - 51%
- Female - 49%
- Asian - 29.6%
- White - 29.0%
- Hispanic - 21.2%
- Black - 15.7%
- Two or More Races - 4.1%
- American Indian/Alaska Native - 0.3%
- Native Hawaiian/Pacific Islander - 0.0%

== History ==
On April 10, 1997, ground was broken on the second of two new high schools in the Lewisville Independent School District. Situated on 70 acres of land, the school was intended to allow students from north Carrollton to avoid the commute to The Colony High School and Marcus High School. While the school was intended to be named the "North Carrollton High School," potential confusion between it and another school in construction - Carrollton-Farmers Branch Independent School District's planned "Carrollton North High School" (which would itself be named Creekview) - led to the renaming of both schools. While the names "East Side High School" and "West View High School" were considered by Lewisville ISD as replacements, the name "Hebron High School" was ultimately selected in reference to a school of the same name which was built in the same area during the late 19th century.

Hebron was the fourth high school opened by Lewisville ISD, totaling $23 million in preliminary construction costs alone. Hebron was constructed in five phases, with the first three fulfilling the school's immediate student-enrollment needs; construction of the first three phases was completed in June 1998. The fourth and fifth phases included classroom additions and an 800-seat auditorium and were completed after the school's opening. Hebron High School was originally located in the town of Hebron, but its land has since been incorporated into Carrollton.

When Hebron was being built, Lewisville ISD asked students of Arbor Creek Middle School to submit ideas for the mascot and student body nickname of the future school. Suggestions included the “Hawks,” the “Hippos,” and the “Hurricanes”; ultimately, it was decided that the “Hawks” best fit the school. Although the school's colors are black, silver, and royal blue, the school was constructed before this was decided; as such, the interior of the school followed an unrelated yellow and green color scheme until being repainted.

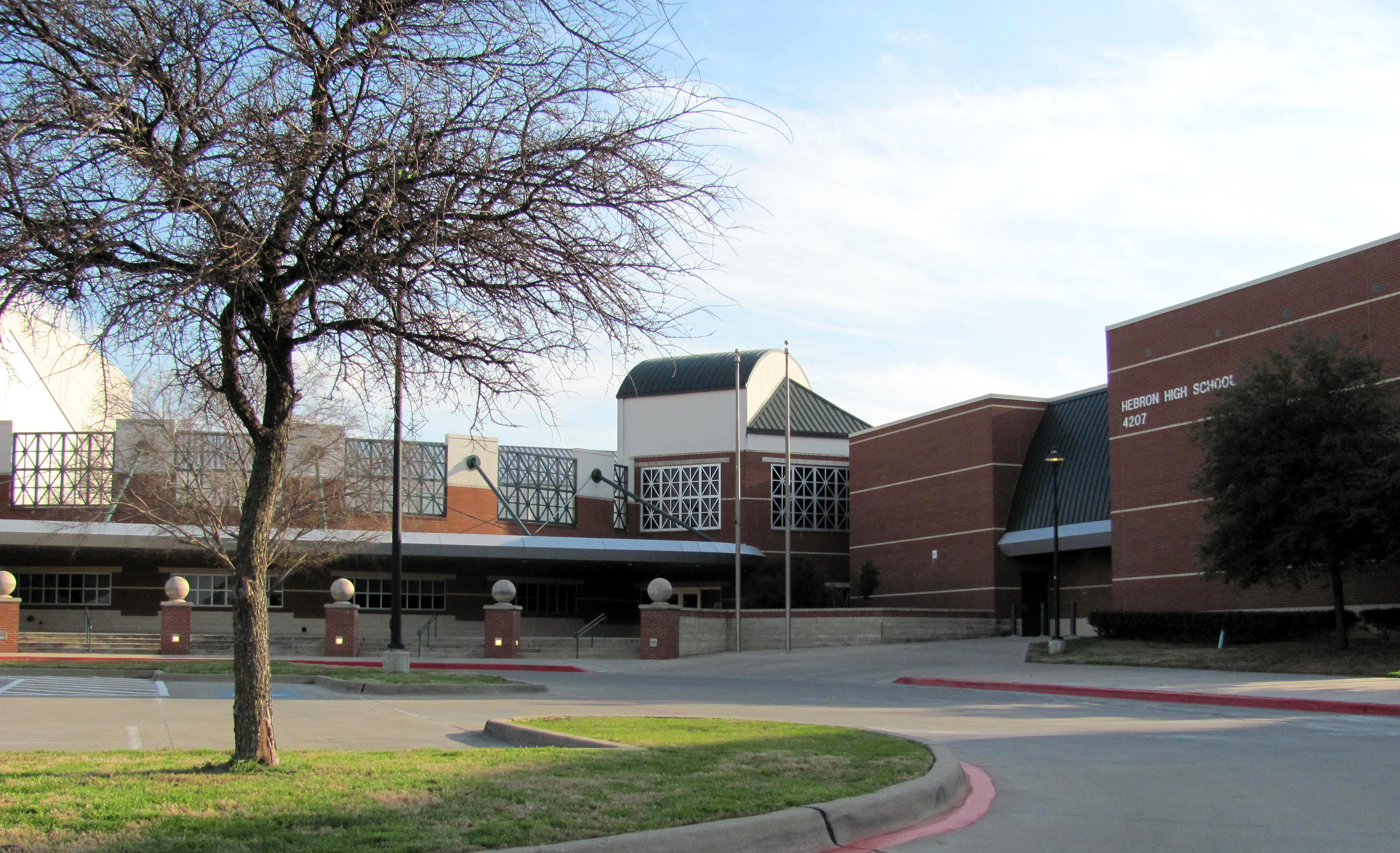
Hebron High School - 2010

The school opened in 1999, originally only serving two grade levels and 498 students; eventually, the school would expand to serve grades nine through twelve. In 2010, the Hebron High School 9th Grade Campus was opened adjacent to the main campus to relieve stress caused by a growing student body.

== Feeder schools ==
Elementary schools that feed into Hebron include:

- Castle Hills Elementary School
- Coyote Ridge Elementary School
- Hebron Valley Elementary School
- Homestead Elementary School
- Hicks Elementary School
- Indian Creek Elementary School
- Polser Elementary School
- Independence Elementary School

Middle schools that feed into Hebron include:

- Killian Middle School
- Arbor Creek Middle School
- Creek Valley Middle School

Students from other schools and districts are able to enroll here.

== Academics ==
In 2015, Hebron High School was rated "Met Standard" by the Texas Education Agency. Hebron has a graduation rate of 98.9% and a drop rate of 0.4%. As of the 2018-2019 school year, HHS serves 133 Bilingual/ESL students, 350 students in the Gifted and Talented (GT) Program, and 240 students through special education services. HHS also participates in the Advanced Placement Program. 46% of students take at least one AP Exam, with a passing rate of 81.8%.

Yearly, dozens of Hebron students are named National Merit commended students - several of whom advance to Semi-Finalist and Finalist status.

Hebron High School students are able to acquire career and technical education (CTE) at two different career centers, Dale Jackson Career Center and Technology, Exploration & Career Center EAST (TECC-E). These two secondary campuses for high school students opened in 2010 to accommodate Lewisville ISD's growing CTE student population.

On the 2016 STAAR, the following scores for all grades show the percentage achieving at Approaches Grade Level or above:

1. English II - 81% (State 73% and District 82%)
2. U.S. History - 97% (State 77% and District 84%)

The number of students who achieved "Advanced" on the STAAR test in English and U.S. History was higher than the state average:

1. "Advanced" English II - 20% (State 17% and District 27%)
2. "Advanced" U.S. History - 49% (State 22% and District 31%)

== Athletics ==
The Hebron Hawks compete in volleyball (girls), cross country running (girls/boys), basketball (girls/boys), wrestling (girls/boys), swimming and diving (girls/boys), soccer (girls/boys), golf (girls/boys), tennis (girls/boys/team), track (girls/boys), football, baseball, and softball.

=== State titles ===
- Girls cross country
  - 2014 (6A)
- Football
  - 2005 (4A/D2)
- Girls soccer
  - 2014 (5A)
- Volleyball
  - 2004 (4A), 2010 (5A), 2015 (6A), 2016 (6A), 2017 (6A)
- Girls golf
  - 2020 (6A)
- Girls Water Polo
  - 2026 (6A) (Undefeated, 28-0)

== Extracurricular activities ==
Hebron is recognized for its accomplished marching band. The band is a consistent UIL State Marching competition medalist and Bands of America finalist, as well as the 2010 recipient of the Sudler Shield. The band finished in 3rd place overall at the 2015, the 2019 and the 2023 Bands of America Grand National Championships, and received the Finals caption award for “Outstanding Music Performance” all three times. Additionally, in the 2015 season, the band's Bands of America Grand Nationals semifinals performance score broke the contemporary record for the highest score awarded in the competition’s history, totaling 97.85 of 100 points. Hebron's record stood until November 2021, at which point it was passed by Broken Arrow High School. In 2021 and 2024, the band received the title of UIL 6A State Marching Band Champion. The band performed in the 2022 Rose Parade in Pasadena, California. Hebron is also acclaimed for its concert bands, especially its Wind Symphony who has earned a Sudler Flag of Honor from the John Philip Sousa Foundation (2011), performed at the prestigious Midwest Band and Orchestra Clinic (2010, 2016), been named TMEA Honor Band twice (2011 5A, 2023 6A), and was presented with a Mark of Excellence award by the Foundation for Music Education in 2021.

The Hebron Speech and Debate team is accomplished as well, qualifying CX Teams and Individual Participants in Lincoln-Douglas Debate for the Texas Forensic Association State tournament. Hebron has qualified three teams to the Tournament of Champions for policy debate: Hebron KN (2017-2018), Hebron BS (2019-2020), and Hebron KP (2019-2020).

In 2012, the school newspaper The Hawk Eye received a Silver Crown, a prestigious award given by the Columbia Scholastic Press Association.

== Notable alumni ==
- Jamal Adams, NFL player
- Ian Cunningham, General manager of the Atlanta Falcons
- Braeden Daniels, NFL player
- Cherami Leigh, actress
- Tanner Marsh, CFL player
- Sam Freeman, MLB Player
- Deatrich Wise Jr., NFL player
- Daniel Wise, NFL player
- Stansly Maponga, NFL player
- Shelton Johnson, NFL player
- Jesse Iwuji, motorsports driver and member of the U.S. Navy
- Clayton Tune, NFL player
- Verone McKinley III, NFL player
- Zach DeLoach, MLB Player

== Achievements ==
- Drill team
  - National Champions MA National Dance Championships in 2006, 2007.
  - National Champions HTE National Dance Championships in 2009, 2010.
  - National Champions ADTS National Dance Championships in 2011.
- Cheerleading
  - NCA High School National Champions Large Co-Ed division 2002
- Choir
  - TMEA Invited Performing Choir: 2015, 2023
  - SWACDA Invited Performing Choir: 2017, 2026
  - Festival Di Voce Grand Champion: 2015, 2023
  - Festival Di Voce Top 5: 2022, 2023, 2024, 2025
  - American Prize Winner in High School Choral Performance: 2023
  - American Prize Finalist in Virtual Performance: 2022
  - Mark of Excellence National Winner: 2021
  - ACDA Invited Performing Choir: 2027
- Marching Band
  - BOA Regional Finalist:
  - 2001 - (Arlington Regional, 10th)
  - 2004 - (Arlington Regional, 7th)
  - 2006 - (Arlington Regional, 7th)
  - 2008 - (Arlington Regional, 3rd)
  - 2009 - (Arlington Regional, 3rd)
  - 2010 - (Arlington Regional, 7th)
  - 2011 - (Arlington Regional, 10th)
  - 2012 - (Denton Regional, 4th)
  - 2013 - (Conroe Regional, 4th), (Dallas/Fort Worth Regional, 1st. Captions: Music, General Effect)
  - 2014 - (Denton Regional, 1st. Captions: Music, General Effect)
  - 2015 - (Arlington Regional, 2nd. Captions: Visual)
  - 2016 - (Plano Regional, 3rd)
  - 2017 - (Southlake Regional, 1st. Captions: Music, Visual, General Effect)
  - 2018 - (Bedford Regional, 2nd. Captions: Music)
  - 2019 - (Bedford Regional, 2nd)
  - 2021 - (Dallas/Fort Worth Regional, 2nd. Captions: Music)
  - 2022 - (Dallas/Fort Worth Regional, 1st. Captions: Music, Visual, General Effect)
  - 2023 - (Bedford Regional, 1st. Captions: Music, Visual, General Effect)
  - 2024 - (Dallas Mid-Cities Regional, 1st. Captions: Music, Visual, General Effect)
  - 2025 - (Bedford Regional, 2nd)
  - 2026 - (North Texas Regional in Prosper, 1st. Captions: Music, Visual, General Effect)
  - BOA Super Regional Finalist:
  - 2004 - (San Antonio Super Regional, 14th)
  - 2005 - (San Antonio Super Regional, 14th)
  - 2006 - (San Antonio Super Regional, 9th)
  - 2007 - (San Antonio Super Regional, 13th)
  - 2008 - (San Antonio Super Regional, 8th)
  - 2009 - (San Antonio Super Regional, 9th)
  - 2010 - (San Antonio Super Regional, 8th)
  - 2012 - (San Antonio Super Regional, 7th)
  - 2013 - (San Antonio Super Regional, 2nd)
  - 2014 - (San Antonio Super Regional, 6th)
  - 2015 - (San Antonio Super Regional, 4th. Captions: Music)
  - 2016 - (San Antonio Super Regional, 5th)
  - 2017 - (San Antonio Super Regional, 2nd)
  - 2018 - (San Antonio Super Regional, 3rd. Captions: Music)
  - 2019 - (San Antonio Super Regional, 5th)
  - 2021 - (San Antonio Super Regional, 1st. Captions: Music, Visual, General Effect)
  - 2022 - (San Antonio Super Regional, 1st. Captions: Music, Visual)
  - 2024 - (San Antonio Super Regional, 2nd. Captions: Music)
  - 2025 - (San Antonio Super Regional, Co-1st. Captions: Music)
  - 2025 - (San Antonio Super Regional, 1st. Captions: Music. General Effect)
  - BOA Grand Nationals Finalist:
  - 2015 - (3rd, Outstanding Music Caption)
  - 2019 - (3rd, Outstanding Music Caption, Rose Parade invitation),
  - 2023 - (3rd, Outstanding Music Caption)
  - UIL Area:
  - 2003 - (2nd, 4A)
  - 2005 - (4th, 4A)
  - 2006 - (5th, 5A)
  - 2008 - (5th, 5A)
  - 2010 - (2nd, 6A)
  - 2012 - (2nd, 6A)
  - 2014 - (2nd, 6A)
  - 2016 - (2nd, 6A)
  - 2018 - (2nd, 6A)
  - 2020 - (3rd, 6A)
  - 2021 - (2nd, 6A)
  - 2022 - (1st, 6A)
  - 2023 - (1st, 6A)
  - 2024 - (1st, 6A)
  - 2025 - (2nd, 6A)
  - 2026 - (2nd, 6A)
  - UIL State Finalist:
  - 2008 (10th, 5A)
  - 2010 (6th, 5A)
  - 2012 (2nd, 5A)
  - 2014 (2nd, 6A)
  - 2016 (2nd, 6A)
  - 2018 (4th, 6A)
  - 2020 (2nd, 6A)
  - 2021 (1st, 6A)
  - 2022 (2nd, 6A)
  - 2023 (3rd, 6A)
  - 2024 (1st, 6A)
  - 2025 (2nd, 6A)
  - 2026 (2nd, 6A)
- BOA All-Time Scoring Record
  - 2015 Grand Nationals Semi-Finals: 97.850 (Formerly 1st, currently 2nd)
- Theatre
  - UIL One Act Play State Competition 2017- 2nd Runner Up
- Orchestra
  - TMEA Honor Orchestra Finalist - HS String - 2018 - 9th Place
  - TMEA Honor Orchestra Finalist - HS String - 2019 - 8th Place
