= Mike Williams (offensive lineman) =

American football player (born 1980)

No. 68, 71
- Positions: Offensive tackle, guard

Personal information
- Born: January 11, 1980 (age 46); Dallas, Texas, U.S.
- Listed height: 6 ft 6 in (1.98 m)
- Listed weight: 337 lb (153 kg)

Career information
- High school: The Colony (The Colony, Texas)
- College: Texas (1998–2001)
- NFL draft: 2002: 1st round, 4th overall pick

Career history
- Buffalo Bills (2002–2005); Jacksonville Jaguars (2006); Washington Redskins (2009–2010)

Awards and highlights
- PFWA All-Rookie Team (2002); Consensus All-American (2001); First-team All-Big 12 (2001)

Career NFL statistics
- Games played: 59
- Games started: 56
- Stats at Pro Football Reference

Michael Deshaun Williams (born January 11, 1980) is an American former professional football player who was an offensive tackle and guard in the National Football League (NFL). He played college football for the Texas Longhorns, and was recognized as a consensus All-American. The Buffalo Bills chose him with the fourth overall pick in the 2002 NFL draft, and he played professionally for the Bills and Washington Redskins.

== Early life ==
Williams was born in Dallas, Texas. He graduated from The Colony High School in The Colony, Texas, where he played for The Colony Cougars high school football team. When Williams was in high school, he was so big they didn't have shoulder pads that could fit him; they tried getting pads from Erik Williams and Leon Lett of the Cowboys, and their pads still didn't fit Williams.

== College career ==
While attending the University of Texas in Austin, he played for coach Mack Brown's Texas Longhorns football team from 1998 to 2001. He played right tackle for the Longhorns, while protecting quarterbacks Major Applewhite and Chris Simms. Following his senior season in 2001, he was a first-team All-Big 12 selection and was recognized as a consensus first-team All-American.

== Professional career ==
=== Pre-draft ===
Pre-draft measurables
Height	Weight	Arm length	Hand span	Vertical jump	Broad jump	Bench press
6 ft 5 5/8 in (1.97 m)	375 lb (170 kg)	33 1/2 in (0.85 m)	9 1/4 in (0.23 m)	30.0 in (0.76 m)	8 ft 6 in (2.59 m)	29 reps
All values from NFL Combine

Because Chris Simms was left-handed, Williams was projected as a top prospect for left tackle, widely considered the most important position on the offensive line. He was considered one of the two top prospects in the 2002 NFL draft, alongside Bryant McKinnie, a natural left tackle from the University of Miami.

=== Buffalo Bills ===
Williams was selected by the Buffalo Bills with the fourth overall pick in the first round of the 2002 NFL Draft, three picks ahead of McKinnie. After starting several games at right tackle, he was eventually moved to left tackle, but largely disappointed. He was widely seen as a draft bust and eventually lost the starting job to undrafted free agent Jason Peters. After a failed attempt to convert Williams to guard, and spending some spot duty at defensive tackle in goal-line situation, he was released in the 2006 offseason.

=== Jacksonville Jaguars ===
Williams was signed by the Jacksonville Jaguars on March 14, 2006, He was placed on injured reserve on August 29, 2006, and waived on December 29, 2006. He never appeared in a regular season game for the Jaguars.

=== Washington Redskins ===
Williams spent two years out of football before he gave the NFL another shot and signed with the Washington Redskins on April 24, 2009. At the time he weighed close to 410 pounds and there was some doubt regarding his ability to handle playing tackle again. Williams eventually lost nearly 70 pounds in order to play the position, but struggled when doing so. Because of constant injuries to the Redskins' offensive line, Williams was moved to right guard, where he played well and started eight games at the position. Williams was rewarded for his efforts on March 6, 2010, with a new two-year contract after new head coach Mike Shanahan and his staff reviewed game film of him.

On July 10, 2010, it was reported by The Washington Post that Williams would miss the entire 2010 season due to blood clots near his heart. Williams was later released by Washington on July 30, 2011.

== Legacy ==
Notwithstanding that Williams was a four-season starter, some commentators consider him to be a "draft bust" due to his high draft pick and relative lack of long-term success. The Sporting News named Williams as the No. 4 biggest NFL draft bust from 1989 to 2008. In the game, NFL Street, Williams had the highest speed rating for an offensive lineman, comparable to that of some wide receivers.
