= Audelia, Texas =

Merged community in Texas, US

Audelia
- Merged community
- Location in Texas
- Coordinates: 32.9092912°N 96.7172201°W
- Country: United States
- State: Texas
- County: Dallas
- Elevation: 551 ft (168 m)

Audelia was an unincorporated community in Dallas County, Texas, United States, which merged into Dallas in 1981.

Built upon land granted from Peter's Colony in 1842, Audelia's first settlers were the family Tennessee-born James E. Jackson, who originally named the community Ardelia, for his daughter. From October 1899 to January 1904, a post office operated in the town. 35 people lived there in 1940, and in 1981, it was merged with Dallas.
