= F69 =

F69 may refer to:

- Air Park-Dallas Airport, in Collin County, Texas
- EMD F69PHAC, an experimental North American passenger locomotive
- HMNZS Wellington (F69), a Leander-class frigate of the Royal New Zealand Navy
- HMS Bacchante (F69), a Leander-class frigate of the Royal Navy
- HMS Ulster Monarch (F69), a passenger ferry requisitioned for the Royal Navy
