= Hebron, Texas =

- Town
- Location of Hebron in Denton County, Texas
- Coordinates: 33°01′35″N 96°51′49″W
- Country: United States
- State: Texas
- Counties: Denton, Collin
- Founded: 1890s
- Incorporated: 1961

Government
  - Type: General Law

Area
  - Total: 0.270 sq mi (0.700 km^{2})
  - Land: 0.268 sq mi (0.695 km^{2})
  - Water: 0.0012 sq mi (0.003 km^{2})
- Elevation: 594 ft (181 m)

Population (2020)
  - Total: 803
  - Estimate (2023): 224
  - Density: 835/sq mi (322.5/km^{2})
- Time zone: UTC–6 (Central (CST))
  - Summer (DST): UTC–5 (CDT)
- ZIP Code: 75056
- Area codes: 817 and 682
- FIPS code: 48-33020
- GNIS feature ID: 2412742
- Sales tax: 6.75%

Hebron is a town in Denton County in the U.S. state of Texas, with a small, disconnected section in Collin County. The population was 803 at the 2020 census, and according to 2023 census estimates, the city is estimated to have a population of 224.

== History ==
Hebron was founded in the 1890s and was alternatively known as "Shepton". The land was donated by the Blackland Townsite Company, a subsidiary of the St. Louis and San Francisco Railroad. Historically, the town center was based near the intersection of two railroads, near present-day East Hebron Parkway and 1st Street. Much of that town center has been cleared and developed.

The town was first incorporated in 1961 as a method to prevent Plano and Carrollton from annexing the territory and imposing taxes. The city of Hebron imposed no taxes of its own, and when the time was ripe for a landowner to develop his land, he would ask the town to disannex that parcel. Hebron's city limits once covered about 25 square miles (65 km^{2}) from the Collin County line west to the Trinity River and from the Dallas County line north to State Highway 121. Now it comprises a few plots of land connected with narrow strips and easements, which confuses many maps. Stanley Dozier, the namesake of Dozier Road, was the only mayor of the town between 1961 and 1997. The town is currently managed by a three-person commission with Kelly Clem as the mayor.

Air Park-Dallas Airport was built as a public civilian airstrip within the city limits in 1965.

For the last 20 years, Hebron has disannexed large portions of its territory to be annexed by neighboring communities (Lewisville, The Colony, Carrollton, and Plano) instead. The original goal was for Hebron to disappear entirely as an incorporated community, but recently elected leaders have attempted to reverse the situation and allow Hebron to continue as a town. This is partially in response to the city of Carrollton's threatening not to maintain the water supply unless the town is annexed to Carrollton.

== Geography ==
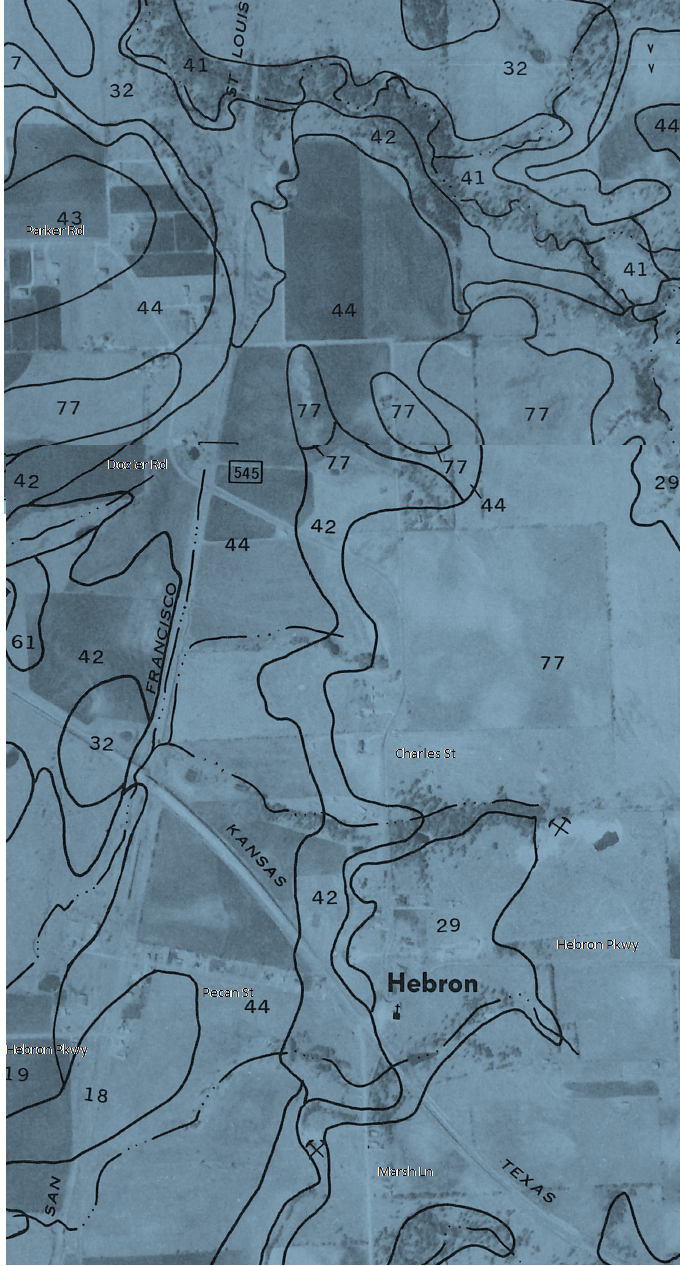
Aerial photograph of Hebron Town Center around 1969

Hebron is located in southeastern Denton County. A small, disconnected piece of the town is in southwestern Collin County.

According to the United States Census Bureau, the city has a total area of 0.269 square miles (0.70 km^{2}), of which, 0.268 square miles (0.69 km^{2}) is land and 0.001 square miles (0.00 km^{2}) is water.

== Demographics ==
Historical population
Census	Pop.	Note	%±
1980	385		—
1990	1,128		193.0%
2000	874		−22.5%
2010	415		−52.5%
2020	803		93.5%
2023 (est.)	224	▼	−72.1%
U.S. Decennial Census; Texas Almanac: 1850-2000; 2020 Census

=== 2020 census ===
As of the 2020 census, there were 803 people, 262 households, and 219 families residing in the town. There were 284 housing units. The racial makeup of the city was 29.3% White, 4.9% African American, 0.6% Native American, 55.0% Asian, 0.0% Pacific Islander, 2.5% from some other races and 7.7% from two or more races. Hispanic or Latino of any race were 6.8% of the population.

=== 2010 census ===
As of the 2010 census, there were 415 people, 137 households, and _ families residing in the town. There were 147 housing units. The racial makeup of the city was 74.0% White, 5.8% African American, 0.2% Native American, 12.8% Asian, 0.0% Pacific Islander, 7.2% from some other races and 0.0% from two or more races. Hispanic or Latino of any race were 14.9% of the population.

=== 2000 census ===
As of the 2000 census, there were 874 people, 271 households, and 243 families residing in the town. The population density was 214.8 inhabitants per square mile (82.9/km^{2}). There were 335 housing units at an average density of 82.3 per square mile (31.8/km^{2}). The racial makeup of the town was 82.27% White, 4.69% African American, 0.11% Native American, 11.33% Asian, 0.69% from other races, and 0.92% from two or more races. Hispanic or Latino of any race were 2.29% of the population.

There were 271 households, out of which 59.8% had children under the age of 18 living with them, 86.3% were married couples living together, 1.8% had a female householder with no husband present, and 10.3% were non-families. 8.1% of all households were made up of individuals, and 1.8% had someone living alone who was 65 years of age or older. The average household size was 3.23 and the average family size was 3.43.

In the town, the population was spread out, with 36.2% under the age of 18, 2.9% from 18 to 24, 41.9% from 25 to 44, 16.1% from 45 to 64, and 3.0% who were 65 years of age or older. The median age was 34 years. For every 100 females, there were 100.9 males. For every 100 females age 18 and over, there were 100.7 males.

The median income for a household in the town was $140,102, and the median income for a family was $140,371. Males had a median income of $93,983 versus $61,250 for females. The per capita income for the town was $42,598. None of the population or families were below the poverty line.

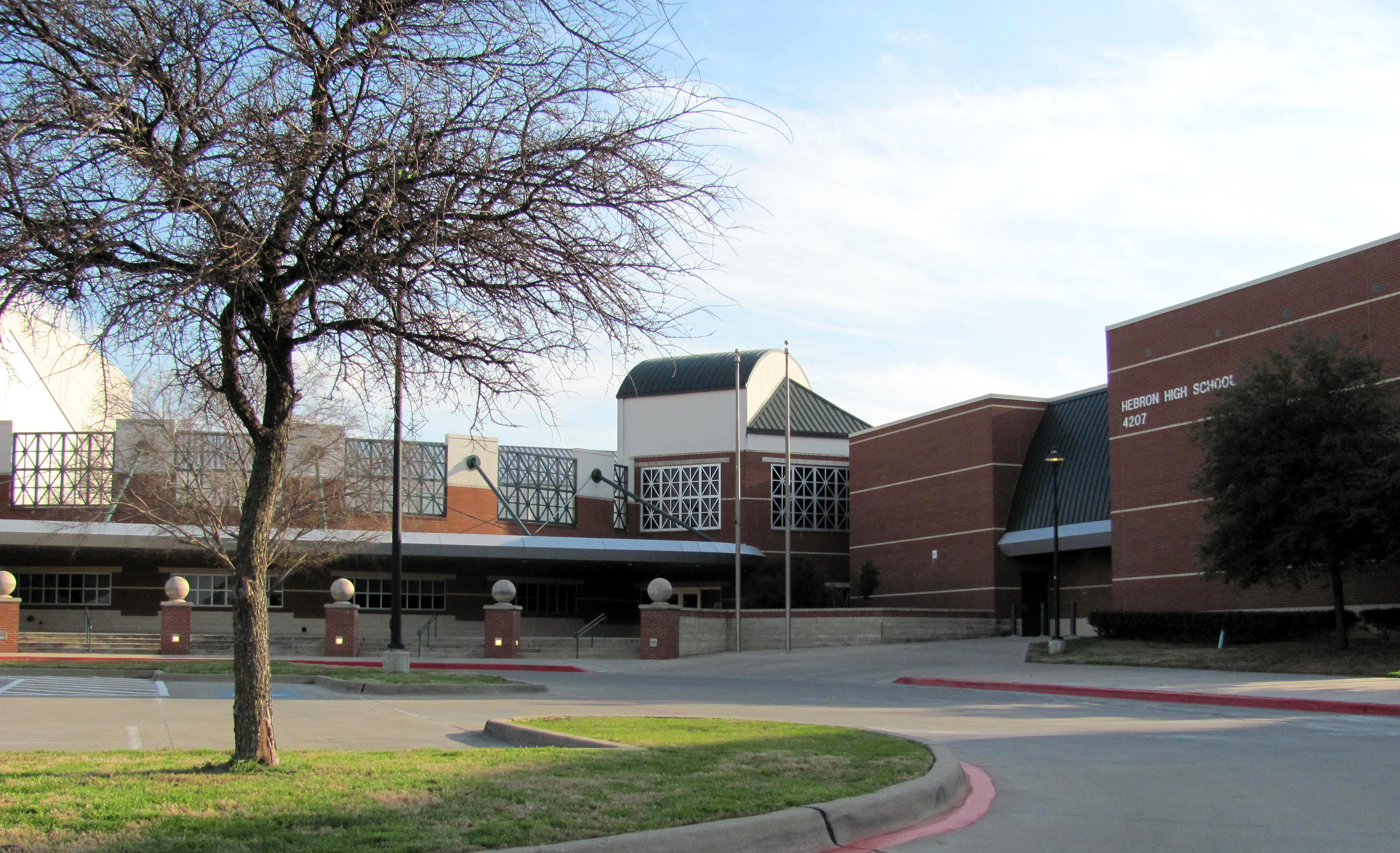
Hebron High School in Carrollton

== Education ==
The Lewisville Independent School District serves Hebron. Hebron High School is in Carrollton.
