= Air Park-Dallas Airport =

- IATA: none; ICAO: none; FAA LID: F69

Summary
- Airport type: Public
- Owner: Crow-Billingsley Air Park, Ltd.
- Serves: Dallas, Texas
- Location: Carrollton, Texas
- Elevation AMSL: 695 ft (212 m)
- Coordinates: 33°01′24″N 096°50′13″W

Map
- Location within Texas

Runways
Direction	Length		Surface
Direction	ft	m	Surface
16/34	3,080	939	Asphalt
- Source: Federal Aviation Administration

Air Park-Dallas Airport (FAA LID: F69) is a public airport located 16 nautical miles (30 km) northwest of the central business district of Dallas, in Collin County, Texas, United States. The airport is used solely for general aviation purposes. It was built as an airpark-style development, with adjacent homeowners having perpetual runway access guaranteed by restrictive covenants, but no formal ownership or management interest in the physical airfield facilities. The airport was formerly within the city limits of Hebron, Texas but was annexed by the city of Carrollton in 2008; the nearby residential lots were not included in the annexation.

The airfield has been the subject of numerous disputes between the adjacent residents, who wish to continue using it to operate personal aircraft, and the airfield owners, who allegedly intend to redevelop the property for non-aviation-related commercial purposes.

== Facilities ==
Air Park-Dallas Airport has one runway:

- Runway 16/34: 3,080 by 30 feet (938.8 m × 9.1 m), Surface: Asphalt

== History ==
Air Park-Dallas was built in 1965 as a privately owned, public-use airport by Milton Noell, former mayor of Addison, Texas, and his son David Noell. Lots were sold and many homes were built at the airport, but the Noells' plans to develop the remainder of the property as a country club-type facility never came to fruition. In 1983, Milton Noell sold a 50-percent share of airport ownership to Henry Billingsley and Lucy Crow Billingsley, daughter of Trammell Crow, a major Dallas-area real estate developer. In 1990, Milton Noell died, and his sons David and Robert Noell each inherited half of his remaining 50-percent stake in the airport.

Prior to Milton Noell's 1983 sale of his share in the airpark—an action prompted by financial problems—the Noells placed restrictive covenants that run with the land and specify that for the scheme of the neighborhood to change, or for any changes to be made in the restrictive covenants, a vote of three-fourths of all the property owners' lots is required.

In 2000, Air Park-Dallas was listed by the National Air Transportation Association on its "100 Most Needed Airports" list; that same year, Henry Billingsley purchased Robert Noell's stake and restructured his partnership with David Noell, gaining more control while granting David Noell a lease to manage the facility. Around this time, the formerly rural nature of the surrounding land had been changing; notably, the Shops at Willow Bend shopping mall opened on the opposite corner of an adjacent major street intersection in 2001, and the value of nearby commercial land had burgeoned. In 2004, Billingsley terminated Noell's lease, citing the poor condition of commercial buildings on the site; Noell sued, accusing him of plotting to end their partnership so the airport could be closed and the property redeveloped. Similar accusations were made by residents of the adjacent homes, who contended that deed covenants guarantee their access to a maintained runway in perpetuity, but Billingsley was neglecting airport maintenance to coerce them into agreeing with his redevelopment plans. Residents also said that Billingsley sought annexation of the airport into Carrollton because city officials were likely to back redevelopment. Billingsley's attorney denied these accusations.

Billingsley gained a seat on the Zoning Committee, the governing body charged with "maintaining the best interests of the community." Billingsley has been challenged by the homeowners who allege that some of his actions were not in the best interest of the community, and several lawsuits have been filed over the years for disagreements the homeowners had with Billingsley. In 2007, Billingsley petitioned Hebron to de-annex his companies property, and then requested the City of Carrollton to annex a parcel of the land. Several public hearings were held before the Carrollton City Council. The homeowners ultimately prevailed in trial court against Billingsley, whereupon he appealed the case to the state court of appeals. The jury's findings were upheld on appeal, with the justices citing the proposed runway closure as an "unconstitutional taking". Billingsley appealed again to the Texas Supreme Court, who declined to hear the case.

The North end of the commercially zoned part of the airport was formally annexed by the city of Carrollton, Texas on February 5, 2008. The site had been disannexed by Hebron on November 11, 2007. The annexation ordinance excludes the adjacent homes. The Airpark homes were not annexed, and are in unincorporated Collin County. The city of Plano provides water, but all homes are on septic sewer systems. Law enforcement for homeowners is provided by the Collin County Sheriff's office. Schools are provided by the Plano I.S.D.

On March 9, 2012, David Wakefield Noell died at the age of 70. Mr. Noell is survived by his children, Matthew David Noell (45) and younger sister Melissa Ann (Noell) Etienne with husband David, and his Grandchildren Chelsie Noell, Bryan Noell Etienne, Austin and Lauren Etienne.

== Legal disputes ==
=== Homeowners' continued rights to the runway ===
The airfield property has been subject to litigation involving the City of Carrollton, Texas, Carrollton Properties Standards Board; Air Park Common Area Preservation Association, Inc., Dale Burgdorf, Chad Maisel and Amy Eklund; Crow-Billingsley Air Park, Ltd., Air Park-Dallas Zoning Committee, and Henry Billingsley; and David Noell. Airpark residents contend that they are guaranteed an “aircraft landing area,” a minimum of 300 feet wide and 3,000 feet long, “will at all times be available to the homesites property owners via taxiways . . . .” and that “the landing area” will be “owned, controlled and maintained by Air Park Associates”.

It is undisputed that Billingsley purchased his Air Park interests solely as an investment and never with the intent to operate an airport. However, the Air Park Common Area Preservation Association, representing the residents of Air Park Estates, has been successful in preventing the destruction of the runway thus far.

=== Discrimination claim ===
In or about 2002, a resident sought to build a footbridge with handrails over a culvert in the front lawn to ease access to her mailbox and the street. She had been diagnosed with adrenomyeloneuropathy, a progressive neurological disorder that limits her ability to walk. She and her husband subsequently had the footbridge installed at their own expense. In 2004, the four members of the Zoning Committee at that time—Henry Billingsley, Lucy Billingsley, David Noell, and Lucilio Peña—informed the residents that they were required to remove the footbridge. The residents refused, and in early 2006, the Committee filed a lawsuit alleging violations of Air Park Estates' restrictive covenant. In 2007, the residents filed complaints against Henry Billingsley, and later the Zoning Committee, with the United States Department of Housing and Urban Development pursuant to the Fair Housing Act alleging discrimination on the basis of disability.

On January 13, 2011, the parties in the lawsuit agreed to settle the dispute without further court action. The residents were allowed to retain the footbridge or replace it with another design previously approved by the Zoning Committee.

== Accidents and incidents ==
- May 31, 1974: A Beechcraft C35 Bonanza, registration number N1985D, was destroyed and its pilot and passenger seriously injured when it lost power and crashed in a farm field while circling Air Park-Dallas to land. The crash was attributed to improper maintenance; the craft's throttle linkage had fallen apart due to an improperly tightened bolt.
- July 8, 1977: A Piper PA-22 Tri-Pacer, registration number N3954P, struck fence posts and suffered significant damage after the pilot mishandled the aircraft during landing at Air Park-Dallas; the student pilot and sole occupant was not injured.
- August 4, 1977: A homebuilt Smyth Sidewinder, registration number N11KG, rolled over during final approach to land at Air Park-Dallas, killing its pilot and sole occupant. The crash was attributed to insufficient airspeed.
- July 15, 1995: A Beechcraft C35 Bonanza, registration number N1997D, struck a tree and crashed in a field in Plano, Texas 0.5 mi (0.8 km) north of Air Park-Dallas after losing power during the final landing approach; the aircraft suffered substantial damage, the pilot suffered minor injuries, and a passenger was seriously injured. The aircraft's engine had lost power when the pilot switched to the auxiliary fuselage fuel tank, so the pilot selected the left main wing tank, and did not attempt to switch tanks again when the engine lost power for the second time. Investigators found that while the left tank and fuselage tank were both nearly empty, the right main tank still contained an adequate quantity of fuel, and attributed the crash to "fuel starvation due to the improper position of the fuel selector, and failure the [sic] pilot to follow emergency procedures."
- February 9, 2008: A Piper PA-28-140, registration number N4998L, struck trees and slid to a halt in the middle of nearby International Parkway after the pilot initiated a go-around to avoid overshooting the runway; the aircraft was substantially damaged but there were no injuries to the 3 occupants. The crash was attributed to "The pilot's delay in aborting the landing."
- May 1, 2016: A Mooney M20, registration number N3386X, drifted to the left of Runway 34 on landing and impacted a fence, causing substantial wing damage, with the pilot and single passenger suffering minor injuries. The accident was attributed to "The pilot's failure to maintain directional control during the aborted landing in gusty wind conditions, which resulted in a collision with a fence.".

== See also ==
- List of airports in Texas
