= Jack Cushing =

American baseball player (born 1996)

Olmecas de Tabasco – No. 95
- Pitcher
- Born: December 3, 1996 (age 29); Flower Mound, Texas, U.S.
- Bats: Right Throws: Right

KBO debut
- April 12, 2026, for the Hanwha Eagles

KBO statistics (through 2026 season)
- Win–loss record: 1–2
- Earned run average: 4.79
- Strikeouts: 26
- Saves: 4

Teams
- Hanwha Eagles (2026)

John Gowen Cushing (born December 3, 1996) is an American professional baseball pitcher for the Olmecas de Tabasco of the Mexican League. He has previously played in the KBO League for the Hanwha Eagles.

== Amateur career ==
Cushing attended Edward S. Marcus High School in Flower Mound, Texas, where he played baseball. After graduating in 2015, he played four years of college baseball at Georgetown University.

== Professional career ==
=== Oakland Athletics / Athletics ===
Cushing was selected by the Oakland Athletics in the 22nd round (674th overall) of the 2019 Major League Baseball draft. Cushing signed with Oakland and split his first professional season between the Arizona League Athletics and Vermont Lake Monsters, going 3–6 with a 6.00 ERA over 42 innings. He did not play a game in 2020 due to the cancellation of the minor league season.

Cushing opened the 2021 season with the Stockton Ports and was promoted to the Lansing Lugnuts and Double-A Midland RockHounds during the season. Over 21 games (19 starts) between the three teams, Cushing went 7–7 with a 3.22 ERA and 111 strikeouts over 111 2/3 innings. He began the 2022 season with Midland and was promoted to the Triple-A Las Vegas Aviators in mid-June. After struggling to a 14.14 ERA over 21 innings with the Aviators, he was demoted back to Midland in mid-July. Over 19 starts with Midland, he went 11–3 with a 3.67 ERA and 95 strikeouts over 110 1/3 innings. Cushing spent the majority of the 2023 season with Midland, but also appeared in three games for Las Vegas. Over 31 games (21 starts) between both affiliates, he went 8-6 with a 5.36 ERA and 130 strikeouts over 124 1/3 innings.

Cushing split the 2024 campaign between Las Vegas and Midland, accumulating a 5-3 record and 3.77 ERA with 74 strikeouts and two saves across 37 appearances (five starts). He returned to Las Vegas in 2025, compiling an 11-2 record and 6.67 ERA with 83 strikeouts across 38 appearances (six starts). Cushing elected free agency following the season on November 6, 2025.

=== Hanwha Eagles ===
On February 10, 2026, Cushing signed a minor league contract with the Toronto Blue Jays and was subsequently assigned to the Triple-A Buffalo Bisons. He was released by Toronto prior to the start of the regular season on March 21.

On April 5, 2026, Cushing signed with the Hanwha Eagles of the KBO League as an injury replacement for Owen White, who had injured his hamstring in his first appearance for the team. He pitched in 16 contests (including one start) for the Eagles, compiling a 1-2 record and 4.79 ERA with 26 strikeouts across 20 2/3 innings pitched. On May 15, Cushing's six-week contract with the team expired.

=== Sultanes de Monterrey ===
On June 9, 2026, Cushing signed with the Sultanes de Monterrey of the Mexican League. In two starts for the Sultanes, he allowed 15 earned runs over nine innings pitched (15.00 ERA) and struck out 10 batters. On June 29, Cushing was released by Monterrey.

=== Olmecas de Tabasco ===
On July 9, 2026, Cushing signed with the Olmecas de Tabasco of the Mexican League.
