= Flower Mound High School =

School in Flower Mound, Texas, United States

Coordinates: 33.0328°N 97.0816°W

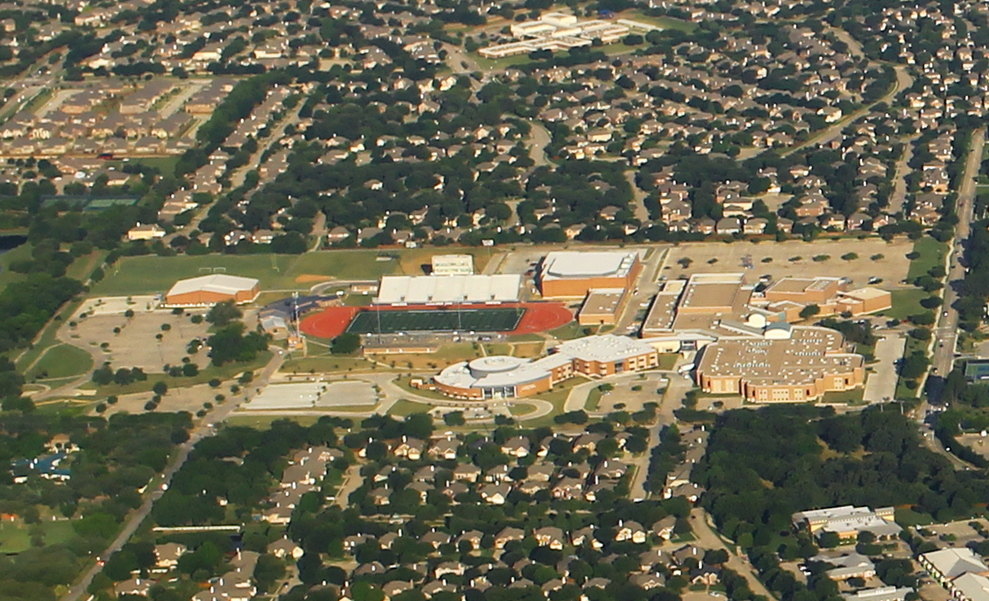

Location
- 3411 Peters Colony; Flower Mound, Denton County, Texas 75022; United States

Information
- Type: Public High School
- Motto: A World Class School Educating Tomorrow's Leaders
- Established: August 1999
- School district: Lewisville ISD
- NCES District ID: 4827300
- CEEB code: 442-434
- NCES School ID: 482730008196
- Principal: Shannon Knowles
- Teaching staff: 213.12 (FTE)
- Grades: 9–12
- Enrollment: 3,426 (2024-2025)
  - Grade 9: 884
  - Grade 10: 824
  - Grade 11: 859
  - Grade 12: 859
- Student to teacher ratio: 16.08
- Schedule type: 4x4 block schedule
- Colors: Blue, silver, and white
- Fight song: The Victors
- Athletics conference: UIL 6A
- Mascot: The Flower Mound Jaguar
- USNWR ranking: 1,314
- Publication: FMHS Wire
- Feeder schools: McKamy Middle School, Forestwood Middle School, Shadow Ridge Middle School
- TEA School Code: 061902010
- Website: fmhs.lisd.net
- Last updated: January 27, 2026

Flower Mound High School (FMHS) is part of Lewisville Independent School District and is located in Flower Mound, Texas, United States. The school rests on 52 acres (21 ha) of land that was purchased in 1993. With the expansion of the town in the 1980s and 1990s, FMHS was built to accommodate the growth. FMHS was the second high school built in Flower Mound, after Edward S. Marcus High School. FMHS consistently receives an "A" rating from the Texas Education Agency. The school's fight song is the Michigan Wolverines' fight song, "The Victors".

== History ==
Flower Mound High School was built to relieve pressure from Edward S. Marcus High School and Lewisville High School. Plans were set for a 280,000-square-foot (26,000 m^{2}) campus, including two gymnasiums, a cafetorium, an auditorium, a band hall, a football field, tennis courts, and three parking lots. To accommodate additional students, a previously unplanned wing containing 45 additional classrooms was completed in time for the 2000–2001 school year.

108 staff members, led by principal Norman Reuther, taught the first student body of 986 freshman and sophomores. The school was recognized as "exemplary" in the charter year by the TEA. In the school's second year, varsity sports were introduced and the student body grew to include grades nine through eleven.

In 2000, Kansas State University threatened legal action against FMHS for an alleged copyright violation on the Jaguar logo. Rather than pay a licensing fee to KSU, as some schools in Texas were then doing, Reuther ordered a redesign of the logo, to avoid the 8% merchandise commission.

In August 2001, Reuther welcomed the school's first senior class; the student body grew to over 2,400 students.

Reuther left FMHS at the end of the 2003 school year. Assistant principal Jack Clark subsequently took over the position of principal. Under his leadership, the school's enrollment continued to grow. In the spring of 2007, Clark announced his retirement. Paul Moon was selected to head the school.

In January 2008, Moon announced that FMHS would undergo an expansion adding a third gymnasium and a second band room, to be completed in May 2009.

In Spring 2008, LISD began random drug testing of all high school students in extracurricular and co-curricular groups; 75 weekly random students from FMHS were tested that spring and 48 students per week were tested for the 2008–09 school year.

In May 2011, FMHS announced that Paul Moon would retire and pass the leadership to Sonya Lail.

In 2013, the school began a project to build a new campus that would be for 9th graders only. The class of 2018 was the first class to use the new freshman center. Jeff Brown was named the principal of the separated campus.

In 2019, FMHS announced that Lail would retire and pass the leadership to Chad Russell.

In January 2025, LISD filed construction plans to complete phase 2 of the 20-Year Life Cycle Maintenance and Repair project. This refresh is to complete maintenance, including the auxiliary gym, classrooms, and the auditorium. The plan alots $18 million for the total budget, with a separate $3.9 million renovation project to the concession building and press box filed. Work began as early as March 3, and is planned to last until October 2026. The maximum price for the second phase was predicted to be $965,000 over budget for a total of $20.7 million.

In Summer 2025, FMHS completed upgrades to its stadium costing $4.2 million, funded by a 2024 bond.

== Demographics ==
The demographic breakdown of the 3,426 students attending in 2024-2025 was:

(Parenthesis indicate NCES data, by number of students)

- White – 49.3% (1,721)
- Asian – 29.3% (968)
- Hispanic – 13.4% (475)
- African American – 3.3% (105)
- Other – 4.1% (157)

A total of 243 students are eligible for free or reduced price lunch: 195 students were eligible for free lunch, and 48 students were eligible for reduced price lunch.

== Athletics ==
Flower Mound High School is a 6A school, competing as part of the University Interscholastic League in District 5-6A, the classification for schools with the largest enrollment. Its main rival is Marcus High School, the school FMHS plays against annually in the Mound Showdown. Other rivals include Lewisville High School in the Battle of the Axe, and Hebron High School. Students compete in many sports, including American football, boys' and girls' soccer, boys' and girls' basketball, baseball, cross country, golf, softball, tennis, swimming, track, volleyball, bowling, wrestling and ice hockey.

- In spring 2014, the baseball team won the state 5A title.
- In 2012, the softball team received national exposure when they lost a playoff game on a controversial missed-base rule.
- In February 2015, at a boys' basketball game against Plano East Senior High School, two students in the Flower Mound High School student section held up signs reading "White Power". On February 20, 2015, the Lewisville Independent School District confirmed the display of the signs had been intentional and stated that, in conjunction with the local police department, disciplinary action had been taken.
- In 2016, the girls' soccer team won the state 6A title, winning the first state title for any girls' team.
- In 2018, the school's cheer team made third place at UCA Nationals in Orlando (Super Varsity Game Day).
- In 2019, the boys’ soccer team won the state 6A title, winning the team's first state title. The score was 1-0 (4-1 PK) against Legacy of Educational Excellence High School.
- In 2023, the 6A baseball team won state championship.

== Academics ==
FMHS consistently receives an "A" rating from the Texas Education Agency under their A-F school report card system, which is the highest rating.

Flower Mound has received Gold Performance Acknowledgments from the TEA for its attendance (2002–06), AP/IB results (2002–06), college admissions (2003, 2004, 2005 and 2006), and the Recommended High School Program (2003, 2004, 2005, and 2006) under the past Academic Excellence Indicator System, now replaced with Texas Academic Performance Reports (TAPR). In 2005, The Texas Educational Excellence Project ranked FMHS 23rd in the state for Latino Achievement, despite the fact that only 8.2% of the town is Latino or Hispanic compared to a statewide average of 35.7%. (Note: U.S. Census Bureau. Census 2000. "Census Demographic Profiles, Flower Mound, Texas" (PDF). CenStats Databases.)

In 2006, Flower Mound High School was called one of the top ten "best public high schools" in the Dallas area.

=== Advanced classes ===
Flower Mound offers advanced classes including Advanced Placement and Pre-Advanced Placement courses (also called Pre-AP or Honors), and various auxiliary courses are available to students for further research into disciplines of their choice as "elective" courses. Since the fall of 2015, Flower Mound has offered Gifted and Talented (GT) courses for students previously in GT/LEAP classes.

According to the 2025 FMHS Profile, FMHS currently offers the following AP classes:

- AP English Language and Composition
- AP English Literature and Composition
- AP Precalculus
- AP Calculus (Both AB and BC)
- AP Statistics
- AP Biology
- AP Chemistry
- AP Physics 1
- AP Physics 2
- AP Physics C: Mechanics (Must be taken with Electricity and Magnetism)
- AP Physics C: Electricity and Magnetism (Must be taken with Mechanics)
- AP Environmental Science
- AP Art and Design (Three individual courses)
  - AP Art 2 Draw and Design
  - AP Art 2-Dimensional
  - AP Art 3-Dimensional
- AP Human Geography
- AP World History: Modern
- AP United States History
- AP European History
- AP United States Government and Politics
- AP Macroeconomics
- AP Microeconomics
- AP Comparative Government and Politics
- AP Psychology
- AP Computer Science A
- AP Spanish Language and Culture
- AP Spanish Literature and Culture
- AP French Language and Culture

As of 2025, the school recognized a total of 657 students who achieved an Advanced Placement Award; composed of 163 AP Scholars, 122 AP Scholars with Honor, and 372 AP Scholars with Distinction

In 2007, 36.4% of FMHS students took at least one AP or dual-enrollment course in the 2005–2006 school year; 32.2% of the school population took at least one AP or IB test; that number rose in 2007 to 39.2%. 75% of the 1,162 AP tests taken scored a "passing" 3, 4, or 5, which was above the national average of 57.0%.

=== Off-campus education ===
Flower Mound High School provides students with off-campus instruction options. The LISD Virtual Learning Academy (VLA), provides flexible online courses for high school students. Flower Mound students can also enroll in courses at the Technology, Exploration and Career Center East & West (TECC-E & TECC-W), which replaced the aging Dale Jackson Career Center. Lewisville ISD announced plans for the opening of a night school in January 2009 meant to supplement and accelerate existing high school education and provide an alternative path to a high school diploma.

=== Dual Credit ===
Flower Mound High School offers Dual Credit, in a partnership with North Central Texas College and Collin College. According to the LISD, these classes offer "students the chance to take college-level classes, taught on the high school campus by college professors. When students successfully complete Dual Credit courses, they earn both high school credit and college credit for the corresponding college course from the partnering college/university."

==== NCTC Criteria ====
Dual Credit courses require specific criteria to be met for a student to take it. The student must meet the college readiness requirements, and be accepted into Dual Credit. Students are directly responsible for their own costs, except for those covered by the Free/Reduced Lunch Program. The current tuition per credit hour as of 2025 is US$55.

The student must meet a minimum SAT/ACT/TSIA2 score, which is part of the College Readiness Requirements:

Dual Credit College Readiness Score Information for NCTC
Test	Reading/Writing	Math
SAT	480	530
ACT	40 (English + Reading)	22
TSIA2	Essay score 5–8 with CRC 945–990 OR Essay score 5–8 with CRC 910-944 AND NRS Level 5–6	CRC 950–990 OR CRC 910-949 AND NRS Level 6
PSAT*	460	510
STAAR*	English 2: 4000	Algebra 1: 4000 and a grade of 70 or higher in Algebra 2

Note - PSAT & STAAR are only accepted under a TSIA2 Waver.

Students must score college level on math portions of tests to take Dual Credit math courses. Similarly, students must score college level on ELAR portions of tests to take any other Dual Credit course.

==== Results ====
Each dual credit course is worth 0.5 high school credits, and has the potential to earn 3 college credit hours per course. Dual Credit grades are included in the high school GPA, and the multiplier is 1.2, except for the Independent Study Math paired with College Algebra being a 1.1 multiplier.

==== Other Information ====
FMHS offers both embedded and non-embedded courses for students to take:

- Embedded courses are those that are offered directly at the FMHS campus that earn both high school and college credit, and do not have section numbers.
- Non-Embedded courses are not on the FMHS campus, and are either online or at NCTC. They do have section numbers.
  - Students are not allowed to take online courses that are offered as an embedded course at FMHS.

Students also have the opportunity to take up to 9 credit hours (3 classes) during the summer.

=== Standardized testing ===
Flower Mound participates in College Board PSAT/NMSQT testing. The class of 2025 contained 33 National Merit Semifinalists, 31 of which attained finalist status, and 67 National Merit Commended Scholars. The class of 2024 contained 36 National Merit Semifinalists, 33 of which attained finalist status, and 86 National Merit Commended Scholars. The class of 2023 contained 28 National Merit Semifinalists, 25 of which attained finalist status, and 74 National Merit Commended Scholars.

For the class of 2017, FMHS had 26 National Merit finalists in the first administration of the redesigned PSAT test, 64 National Merit Commended Scholars, and 12 National Hispanic Scholars.

In 2007, the average Flower Mound student scored 1104 on the SAT, compared to a state average of 992. On the ACT, the average Flower Mound composite score was a 22.7, compared to the state average of 20.2.

== Extracurricular activities ==
=== Band ===
The Flower Mound Band is the largest student organization at Flower Mound High School, with 432 members as of 2025. There are five concert bands that meet during the school day. Each band is team-taught, with multiple directors assisting throughout each rehearsal. There are multiple opportunities for participation in other individual and ensemble performances including All-Region/All-State, Solo & Ensemble, jazz band, musical pit orchestra, as well as a Flower Mound Concerto Competition and Flower Mound Ensemble Competition.

All students in LISD have the opportunity to participate in marching band as part of the district curriculum. There are 2 marching bands at Flower Mound High School: the Competition Band and the Jaguar Band. The Jaguar Band is a non-varsity marching band designed to help those still developing their musical and marching skills. Students in the Jaguar Band combine with the Competition Band to perform at every football game. Members of the Competition Band are selected through an adjudication process and compete at both local, UIL and Bands of America events. The Competition Band has been a BOA Grand Nationals Finalist in 2014, 2017, 2021, and 2025, and has been the Champion at the San Antonio Super Regional in 2015, 2016, 2018, 2024, and 2025 (co-champion). The band was also the 2025 Bands of America Grand National runner-up, and became the first band from Texas, to win the Steve Brubaker award for Outstanding Visual Performance. At the UIL State Marching Contest, the Competition Band has been a finalist since 2014 and earned the gold medal in 2016, 2025 and 2026, the silver medal in 2018, and the bronze medal in 2020 and 2024.

=== Math Club ===
In 2006 and 2007, the school achieved the AMC 12 Merit Roll. Attending the UT Arlington Calculus Bowl for the first time, a five-person team from FMHS won first place.

=== UIL academics ===
Flower Mound holds claim to two UIL Academic State Championship titles. The first was won in 2001–2002 by Austin Little in 5A Computer Science, and the second was won in 2006–2007 by Christine Barcellona in 5A Literary Criticism. The 2008–2009 and 2009–2010 FMHS Literary Criticism Teams won first place.

=== Robotics ===
Since its founding, FMHS has offered a robotics program for students. During the founding year, the program started with 2 students, and in 2016 the program expanded to 80 students.

Flower Mound High School Tech Club runs the extracurricular program of robotics, with support from LISD and sponsored by the current FMHS robotics teacher Shon Slatton. FMHS Tech Club offers two programs for FMHS students, including both FIRST Tech Challenge and FIRST Robotics Competition. In the past, FMHS also offered participation in VEX Robotics competitions.

FIRST Tech Challenge Team 12791 Iterative Intentions won the UIL State Championship 6A division during both the 2022-2023 and 2023–2024 season. They also won the Robot Innovation award during the 2023–2024 season. In 2024, 12791 represented the United States in the FIRST Global Challenge in Athens Greece, with 193 countries participating. 12791 won 1st place in the Skills Challenge, Bronze for Innovation in Engineering, 5th place alliance in the Global Grand Challenge, the Social Media Challenge Award.

Team 365X Invictus won both the 2017 and 2019 VEX World Robotics Skills Championship.

In 2016, Team 2019F and 2019A both won VEX Tournament Champion trophies in districts. 2019F also won the Excellence Award and the Programming Skills Award. During this year, FMHS offered 7 VEX teams.

== Feeder schools ==
Elementary schools that feed into Flower Mound include: Bluebonnet, Donald, Forest Vista, Garden Ridge, Liberty, Old Settlers, and Wellington.

Middle schools that feed into Flower Mound include: Forestwood, Shadow Ridge, and McKamy.

== Notable alumni ==
- Bert Auburn, college football placekicker for the Texas Longhorns
- Chris Brown, center for the Phoenix Coyotes (did not graduate)
- Lauren Cox, center/power forward for the Indiana Fever
- Nick Evers, college football quarterback
- James Hanna, former tight end for the Dallas Cowboys
- Caleb Lohner, tight end for the Denver Broncos
- Nick Stephens, free agent quarterback with the NFL

== See also ==
- Lewisville Independent School District
