= Nick Stephens =

American football player (born 1987)

Profile
- Position: Quarterback

Personal information
- Born: May 19, 1987 (age 39); Flower Mound, Texas, U.S.
- Listed height: 6 ft 3 in (1.91 m)
- Listed weight: 221 lb (100 kg)

Career information
- High school: Flower Mound (TX)
- College: Tennessee; Tarleton State
- NFL draft: 2012: undrafted

Career history
- Tennessee Titans (2012)*; Utah Blaze (2013)*; Dallas Cowboys (2013)*; Baltimore Ravens (2013)*; San Jose SaberCats (2014)
- * Offseason or practice squad member only
- Stats at Pro Football Reference
- Stats at ArenaFan.com

Nick Stephens (born May 19, 1987) is an American former football quarterback. He played college football at Tennessee and Tarleton State.

== Early life ==
Stephens attended and played high school football at Flower Mound High School in Flower Mound, Texas.

== College career ==
Stephens started attending the University of Tennessee in 2006 and began playing football in 2008 under head coach Phillip Fulmer. He started six of the seven games he played in, with a record of 63 completions in 130 attempts, gaining 840 yards and four touchdowns to go along with three interceptions. After the 2008 season, Fulmer was not retained as head coach. Under new head coach Lane Kiffin, he was used as a backup quarterback to Jonathan Crompton in 2009, completing 9-of-13 passes for 142 yards and one touchdown. In 2010, Stephens transferred to Tarleton State, completing 132-of-258 passes for 1,774 yards and nine touchdowns in eight games. In his senior year in 2011, he completed 242-of-429 passes for 3,005 yards and 29 touchdowns in 11 games.

== Professional career ==
=== Tennessee Titans ===
Stephens signed with the Titans on April 30, 2012, as a rookie free agent. He was waived on August 26, 2012.

=== Dallas Cowboys ===
Stephens signed with the Cowboys' practice squad on December 31, 2012. He was waived by the team on August 27, 2013.

=== Baltimore Ravens ===
Stephens signed with the Ravens' practice squad on October 30, 2013. He was waived by the team on May 30, 2014.
