= Lewisville Independent School District =

School district in Lewisville, Texas, United States

Location
- Lewisville, Texas ESC Region 11 United States

District information
- Type: Public
- Motto: Real Innovation, Limitless Opportunity
- Grades: Pre-K through 12
- Established: 1902
- Superintendent: Dr. Lori Rapp
- Budget: $579.11 million (2020-2021)
- NCES District ID: 4827300

Students and staff
- Students: 52,189 (2020-2021)
- Teachers: 3,605 (2020-2021)

Other information
- Website: Lewisville ISD

Lewisville Independent School District (LISD) is a 127-square mile school district based in Lewisville, Texas (U.S.), covering all of Lewisville, The Colony, Highland Village, Double Oak, and Copper Canyon, as well as portions of Flower Mound, Carrollton, Frisco, Plano, Argyle, Coppell, Grapevine, and Hebron.

The recent suburban growth of the Dallas-Fort Worth Metroplex has caused LISD to grow at a great pace, becoming the 94th-largest school district in the United States in 2006. Proximity calculated a 28.56% increase in student population from 2000 to 2006; LISD was declared the 17th largest school district in the State of Texas in 2008. To help maintain this growth, in May 2008, voters approved a $697 million bond package.

In 2010, the school district was rated "Recognized" by the Texas Education Agency.

== History ==
Lewisville High School opened in 1897 and held its first graduation of 5 students in 1901.

Edward S. Marcus High School opened in 1981. The Colony High School opened in 1986 with grades 9-11, graduating its first senior class in 1988. Lewisville High School-North opened in 1997 as a freshmen center for LHS. Flower Mound High School and Hebron High School both opened in 1999 with grades 9-10, adding a grade each year until their first group of seniors graduated in 2002. In 2005, LHS-North was renamed to C Douglas Killough Lewisville High School North.

For several years in the 2000s and 2010s the district grew by about 2,000 pupils annually. In the 2000s the district expected to have its student body reach 60,000 by 2016, but a 2011 study commissioned by the district stated that the student enrollment would peak at 55,000.

In the early twenty-first century, Lewisville ISD high schools began to reach their capacities, prompting the decision by the school board to construct additional ninth and tenth grade campuses for all schools except for The Colony High School. In the case of Edward S. Marcus High School, Flower Mound High School, and Hebron High School, ninth grade centers were built adjacent to the existing campuses. Lewisville High School gained two additional campuses, LHS Killough and LHS Harmon. Ninth and tenth grade students attend both of these campuses, before attending classes on the main campus for their junior and senior years.

In 2013 the district planned to change attendance boundaries of Flower Mound middle schools, causing some controversy in that city.

== Athletics ==
The 10,000-capacity Max Goldsmith Stadium is the home of the Lewisville Farmers.

== 1:X ==
1:X (pronounced 1 to X) is a program implemented across the District of LISD. The program rolled out iPads to the vast majority of LISD Students, and implemented Google Apps specifically for the school district. The goal is to have "The right technology at the right time."

=== iPad replacement program ===
Beginning in 2018, 4th graders and current high school students received new 10.5" iPad Pro devices with keyboard cases to replace aging iPad Airs implemented in 2014. Students in grades 5-8 received the exact same iPad Air devices they had before, but with a new Mobile Device Management and a new case with no keyboard. In fall 2019, students in grades 5-8 received new iPad Pros with keyboards to match the rest of the district.

=== Fiber network ===
Starting in 2016 and completing in spring 2018, LISD rolled out a fiber optic network provided by Unite Private Networks, that provides speeds of up to 1 Gbit/s. This network replaced aging cable infrastructure from local ISP Grande Communications. The district also installed a link to the Region XI Educational Service Center.

== Schools ==
=== High schools ===
NOTE: Killough and Harmon are 9th-10th Grade campuses which feed into Lewisville High School but are located away from the LHS campus. Flower Mound, Hebron, and Marcus each have separate 9th Grade campuses co-located with their respective high schools. The Colony High School does not have a separate 9th Grade campus. Plans for a Night HS - Lewisville Learning Center were announced in January 2009. Douglas C. KHS operated at a facility what was formerly a Lina Milikan MS on Savage Lane

High schools
Name	Grades	Established	Mascot	Colors	Location	Additional information
Hebron High School	10-12	1999	Hawks	Royal Blue, Black, & Silver	Carrollton	
Hebron High School 9th Grade Campus	9	2010	Hawks	Royal Blue, Black, & Silver	Carrollton	
Flower Mound High School	10-12	1999	Jaguars	Navy & Silver	Flower Mound	
Flower Mound High School 9th Grade Campus	9	2014	Jaguars	Navy & Silver	Flower Mound	
Lewisville High School	11-12	1897	Fighting Farmers	Maroon & White	Lewisville	
Lewisville High School Harmon	9-10	1997	Fighting Farmers	Maroon & White	Lewisville	
Lewisville High School Killough	9-10	2011	Fighting Farmers	Maroon & White	Lewisville	
Marcus High School	10-12	1981	Marauders	Red & Silver	Flower Mound	
Marcus High School 9th Grade Campus	9	2014	Marauders	Red & Silver	Flower Mound	
The Colony High School	9-12	1986	Cougars	Black & Gold	The Colony	

=== Middle schools ===
(S)--denotes a STEM Academy

- Arbor Creek Middle School
- Briarhill Middle School
- Creek Valley Middle School (S)
- Delay Middle School
- Downing Middle School (S)
- Durham Middle School
- Forestwood Middle School (S)
- Griffin Middle School
- Hedrick Middle School (S)
- Huffines Middle School
- Killian Middle School
- Lakeview Middle School
- Lamar Middle School
- McKamy Middle School
- Shadow Ridge Middle School

=== Elementary schools ===
(S)--denotes a STEM Academy

- Bluebonnet Elementary
- Bridlewood Elementary (S)
- Camey Elementary
- Castle Hills Elementary
- Central Elementary
- Coyote Ridge Elementary
- Creekside Elementary
  - Closed prior to 2025-26 school year.
- Degan Elementary
- Donald Elementary (S)
  - 2006 National Blue Ribbon School
- Ethridge Elementary
- Flower Mound Elementary
  - 1993–94 National Blue Ribbon School
- Forest Vista Elementary
- Garden Ridge Elementary
  - Closed prior to 2025-26 school year.
- Hebron Valley Elementary
- Heritage Elementary
  - 2000–01 National Blue Ribbon School
- Hicks Elementary
- Highland Village Elementary
  - 1993–94 National Blue Ribbon School
  - Closed prior to 2025-26 school year.
- Homestead Elementary
- Indian Creek Elementary
- Independence Elementary
- Lakeland Elementary
- Lewisville Elementary
- Liberty Elementary
- McAuliffe Elementary
- Mill Street Elementary (Closed in 2026-27 year because of TEA grades.)
- Memorial Elementary (S)
- Morningside Elementary
- Old Settlers Elementary
- B.B. Owen Elementary
  - Closed prior to 2025-26 school year.
- Parkway Elementary School
- Peters Colony Elementary
- Polser Elementary (S)
  - Closed prior to 2025-26 school year.
- Prairie Trail Elementary
- Rockbrook Elementary
- Southridge Elementary
- Timber Creek Elementary
- Valley Ridge Elementary (S)
- Vickery Elementary
- Wellington Elementary

=== Other schools ===
- Night High School (2009)
- Lillie J. Jackson Early Childhood Center (for students that qualify under the TEA Prekindergarten requirements)
- Vernell Gregg Early Childhood Center (Used to be Mill street)
- The Colony Collegiate Academy (Program)
- Technology, Exploration and Career Center (TECC)-East
- Technology, Exploration and Career Center (TECC)-West
- Lewisville Learning Center (technically classified as a high school). The LLC houses the following programs:
  - Accelerated Division, for grade advancement in both middle and high schools
  - Student Age Parenting Program
  - Adult Education Program (night school for adults wishing to complete their high school diploma)

=== Former schools ===
- Lina Milliken Middle School (opened in 1977, closed in 1997; after closure as a middle school, the facility was used as the Lewisville High 9th Grade Campus until its new facility opened in 2005, whereupon it was closed and unoccupied until 2010 when it reopened as the relocated Delay Middle School)
  - 1992–93 National Blue Ribbon School
- College Street Elementary School (closed in 2019, repurposed as the Student Success Center; as of 2026 the facility has a For Sale sign outside it)
- Stewart's Creek Elementary School (opened 1981, closed early 2021, property later sold to the City of The Colony)
- Dale Jackson Career Center (opened 1985, closed 2020 upon opening of TECC-West, now houses the district's facility services center)
- Hedrick Elementary (closed 2019, demolished along with the former Hedrick Middle School campus and replaced with a larger Hedrick Middle School)
- Mill street (Closed May 2026, Since three years in a row they received a “F” as the TEA Staar Grades, Later reopened in August 2026 as “Vernell Gregg ECC”)

== See also ==
- List of school districts in Texas
