= Killough Lewisville High School North =

Coordinates: 33.06138°N 97.01895°W

Information
- Established: 1997; 29 years ago
- School district: Lewisville Independent School District
- Website: www.lisd.net/lhskillough

Lewisville High School - Killough Campus, previously referred to as Killough LHS - North, LHS-North or LHSN, is a high school in the Lewisville Independent School District in Lewisville, Texas. While the school has existed since the fall of 1997, the school district began construction of its current building in 2003. Prior to its current location, LHS-North operated at what was formerly Miliken Middle School, the current location of Delay Middle School, on Savage Lane.

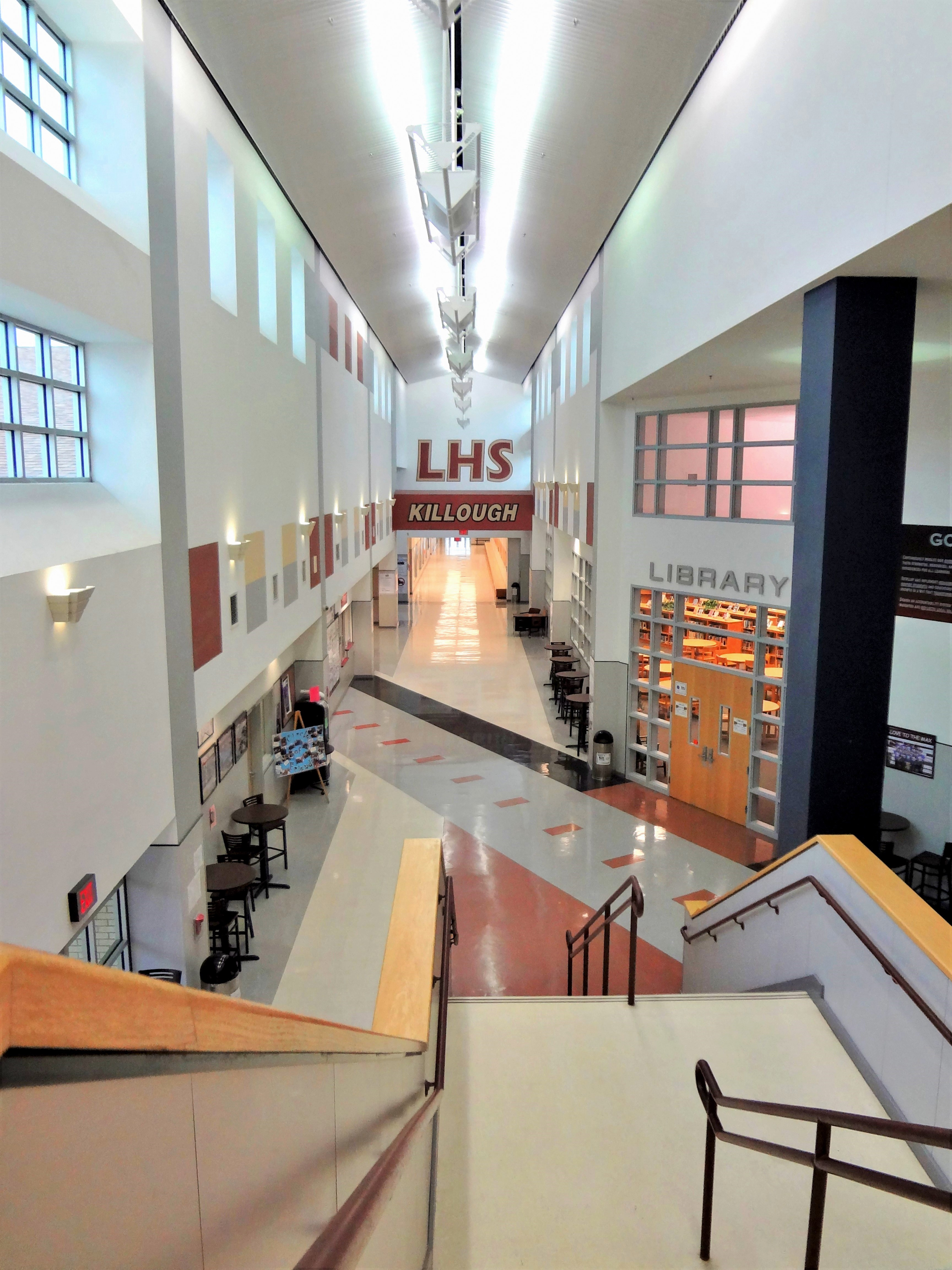
An inside view of the Killough Lewisville High School North campus from atop the main stairway.

The current campus opened in the fall of 2005. At that time, the school was dedicated to retired LISD employee C. Douglas Killough (former principal at Lewisville High School and later assistant superintendent), and the name was formally changed to Killough Lewisville High School North. Killough LHS-North has been named to the "Just for the Kids" Honor Roll in 2005, 2006 and 2007, for its exceptional performance on the Texas Assessment of Knowledge and Skills, or TAKS test. Killough LHS-North was featured in the December 2006 and December 2007 issue of Texas Monthly Magazine. In 2006 it was ranked as the #1 public high school in the state, for being a high performing school based on the National Center for Educational Accountability (formerly known as "Just for the Kids"). (The 2007 issue did not rank the top performing schools individually.) Based on Killough's exceptional performance on the Texas Assessment of Knowledge and Skills, the campus received an exemplary rating by the Texas Education

Agency in 2008–2010.

Lewisville ISD converted the campus into a ninth- and tenth-grade school in 2012. The district also includes another ninth- and tenth-grade high school constructed in south Lewisville off of Round Grove Road, Lewisville High School - Harmon Campus. Collectively the two campuses could house over 2000 students, easing congestion at the newly renovated Lewisville High School (Main Campus). Killough also houses the LHS softball field used by the main high school.

== Feeder schools ==
Lewisville High School - Killough Campus has several feeder schools.

=== Middle schools ===
The feeder middle schools are Huffines, and portions of Delay and Hedrick.

=== Elementary schools ===
The seven feeder elementary schools are College Street, Valley Ridge, Degan, and parts of Central, Hedrick, Vickery and Lakeland.

== See also ==
- Lewisville High School
