= National Air Transportation Association =

American advocacy organization

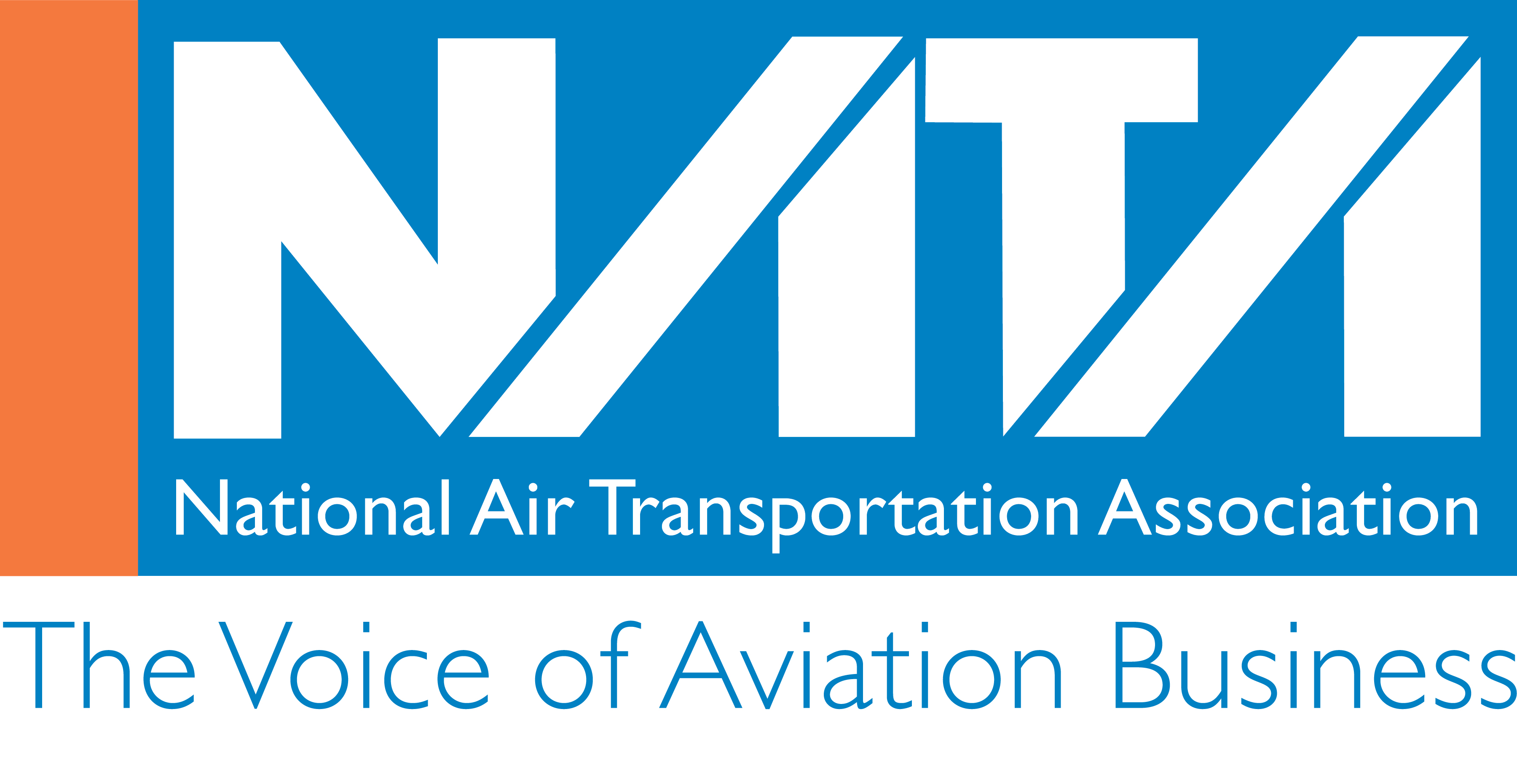
- Founded: 1940
- Type: Not for profit
- Headquarters: Washington, DC, United States
- Field: Aviation advocacy
- Members: 2,300
- Website: www.nata.aero

The National Air Transportation Association (NATA) is the public policy group that represents the interests of the general aviation business community before the United States Congress and federal, state and local government agencies. NATA, founded in 1940, represents nearly 2,300 aviation businesses.

NATA's member companies provide a broad range of services to general aviation, the airlines and the military. They also directly serve the traveling public by providing fuel, on-demand air charter, aircraft rental, storage, and flight training. Other services include aircraft maintenance, parts sales, and line support as well as business aircraft or fractional ownership fleet management. NATA member companies also provide airline baggage and cargo handling services.

NATA represents its members in Washington, D.C., and organizes events including the annual Aviation Business & Legislative Conference, Congressional Reception and Air Charter Summit. It also offers the Safety 1st Professional Line Service Training (PLST) program, which has trained more than 16,000 line service specialists in aircraft handling procedures.

== Programs ==
NATA's mission is to empower its members to be safe and successful aviation businesses. The NATA Safety 1st Program is a key component in achieving that mission. The Safety 1st Program provides safety related resources as well as the following online training programs that are utilized across the aviation industry:

NATA Safety 1st Professional Line Service Training (PLST) – This program has become the "standard" across the FBO industry for the initial and recurrent training of line service technicians. The PLST includes 8 online training modules and exams as well as hands-on training and practical exam components.

NATA Safety 1st Line Service Supervision & Training Management Online (Supervisor Online) – An FAA authorized Aviation Fueling Safety Course in Fire Safety, in which an online supervisor provides the needed foundations in safety, leadership and training necessary for the supervisor role.

NATA Safety 1st Aircraft Flight Coordinator Training (AFCT) – This program provides basic knowledge in topics such as weather, airspace, aircraft weight and balance and much more for flight coordinators working in a Part 91, 135 or 91K environment.

The NATA Safety 1st Program also operates the Ground Audit Standard and Registry. The standard was established to create a consistent operational safety standard for fixed-base operators, airports, and other service providers while increasing the overall safety level of these operations.

In addition to its Safety 1st program, NATA also publishes the quarterly Aviation Business Journal, dedicated to the core businesses of NATA members, including: fuel and line services, aircraft charter and management, aircraft maintenance, flight training, and airline services.

NATA also sponsors a Workers Compensation Insurance Program which rewards the safe practices of its member-participants.
