= Peters Colony =

Land grants in North Texas, 1841–1843

Peters Colony (Peters' Colony) is a name applied to four empresario land grant contracts first by the Republic of Texas and then the State of Texas for settlement in North Texas. The contracts were signed by groups of American and English investors originally headed by William Smalling Peters. Samuel Browning, Peters' son-in-law signed the first contract with the Republic of Texas in Austin on August 30, 1841. Ownership of the empresario company changed many times during the life of the contracts.

The original boundary of Peters Colony started on the Red River at the mouth of Big Mineral Creek, currently in western Grayson County, running south 60 miles, then west 22 miles, then back north to the Red River, and then east along the Red River to the point of origin at Big Mineral Creek. According to the contract, the empresarios were required to recruit 200 families from outside the Republic in three years. Each single man could be granted 320 acres or each family 640 acres. The empresarios were allowed to keep up to half of the settler's grants for services rendered. These services included surveying, title documents, shot, powder, seed, and in some cases a log cabin. The terms of the contract involving titles and the retention of property by the company led to problems between settlers and the company for many years. The Hedgcoxe War was an armed rebellion against the land company's agent Henry Oliver Hedgcoxe on July 16, 1852, in which company records were seized and taken to the Dallas County Courthouse. These problems required additional legislation by the Congress of the Republic of Texas and the Texas Legislature.

Unappropriated land within the original boundary was insufficient; settlers and trading posts were already in the area. A second contract was requested that extended the boundary 40 miles south. It was signed on November 9, 1841. Peters' company had trouble meeting the deadlines, and requested a third contract. It was signed by Sam Houston on July 26, 1842. It extended the boundary to include a 12-mile-wide strip on the east and a 10-mile-wide strip on the west. The fourth contract was signed on January 20, 1843. It extended that deadline to July 1, 1848, and expanded the boundary to include 10 million acres to the west.

The area of Peters Colony included all or portions of 26 counties: Denton, Collin, Cooke, Grayson, Dallas, Tarrant, Wise, Palo Pinto, Ellis, Johnson, Montague, Parker, Hood, Clay, Jack, Erath, Wichita, Archer, Young, Stephens, Eastland, Wilbarger, Baylor, Throckmorton, Shackelford, and Callahan Counties.
