= Edward S. Marcus High School =

Public high school in Flower Mound, Texas, United States

Location
- 5707 Morriss Road; Flower Mound, Texas 75028; United States; 33°3′51″N 97°3′44″W

Information
- Motto: Pride in Excellence
- Opened: 1981
- School district: Lewisville ISD
- NCES District ID: 4827300
- Superintendent: Lori Rapp
- CEEB code: 444132
- NCES School ID: 482730005770
- Principal: Cody Koontz
- Teaching staff: 201.81 (on a FTE basis)
- Grades: 9–12
- Enrollment: 2,998 (2024-2025)
  - Grade 9: 778
  - Grade 10: 721
  - Grade 11: 758
  - Grade 12: 741
- Student to teacher ratio: 14.86
- Campus size: About 52 acres
- Colors: Red and Silver
- Nickname: Marauders
- Feeder schools: Clayton Downing Middle School, Briarhill Middle School, Lamar Middle School
- Website: mhs.lisd.net

Edward S. Marcus High School is a public high school in Flower Mound, Texas. It is a part of the Lewisville Independent School District.

== Academics ==
Marcus High School was named a National Blue Ribbon School by the U.S. Department of Education in 1994–96.

== Athletics ==
Marcus High School Girls' Soccer won the State Championship in 2005. The team won the state title again in 2025.

Edward S. Marcus High School competes as part of the University Interscholastic League (UIL) in District 6-6A. Since 1986, Marcus High School and nearby Lewisville High School have competed in an annual rivalry football game dubbed the "Battle of the Axe". In 2000, the first "Mound Showdown" game was played between Marcus and neighboring Flower Mound High School.

The Marcus Marauders compete in the following UIL sports: Football, Basketball, Soccer, Baseball, Softball, Wrestling, Cheerleading, Track & Field, Cross Country, Golf, Swim, Dive, Tennis, and Volleyball.

The school fields a combined ice hockey team with Flower Mound High School in non-UIL competitions. The school has a full football field, and an off campus baseball field.

== Fine Art ==
Marcus High School has orchestra, band, art, theater and choir programs. Their band program won five UIL marching band state titles from 2006 to 2014.

== Ninth Grade Center ==
After the Lewisville ISD school board raised concerns over overpopulation in 2008, the Marcus 9th Grade Center opened in August 2014. Common freshman courses are offered on the campus, including English I, Algebra I, Geometry, World Geography, and Biology. Students also have the option to take elective courses on the main campus.

== Demographics ==
The demographic breakdown of the 3,092 students attending in 2019–2020 was:

- White – 70.4%
- Hispanic – 14.0%
- Asian – 8.2%
- African American – 3.8%
- American Indian – 0.3%
- Pacific Islander – 0.1%
- Two or more races – 3.2%

7.5% of students were eligible for free or reduced-price lunch and considered "economically disadvantaged" by the Texas Education Agency. 1.6% of students' primary language was one other than English and 11.7% of students received special education services.

== Lone Star Classic ==
Since 2010 the annual Lone Star Classic drumline competition has been staged at the Stadium at Marcus High School.

== Notable alumni ==
- Josh Carraway – former NFL linebacker
- Mason Cox – professional Australian Football League player
- Jack Cushing – baseball pitcher in the Toronto Blue Jays organization
- Scott Michael Foster – actor
- Sam Garza – former professional soccer player
- Greyson "Goldenglue" Gilmer — League of Legends Coach
- Sarah Huffman – retired professional soccer player and women's national team member
- Cooper Land – former professional basketball player
- Jason Neill — former CFL defensive tackle
- Garrett Nussmeier — LSU Tigers quarterback
- Hayley Orrantia – actress and singer
- Ryan Pace – former Chicago Bears general manager
- Riley Parker - soccer player
- Colin Poche — Tampa Bay Rays pitcher
- Paxton Pomykal — FC Dallas midfielder
- Ryan Pressly – Major League Baseball (MLB) pitcher for the Houston Astros and World Series champion
- Chris Sanders – former AFL quarterback
- Marcus Smart – Los Angeles Lakers guard
- Kaden Smith — former New York Giants tight end
- Emma Sralla — discus thrower
- J. Michael Sturdivant — Florida Gators wide receiver
- Keaton Sutherland — former Cincinnati Bengals offensive lineman
- Tomas Pondeca - professional soccer player with FC Dallas and the U.S. Men’s Futsal National Team
