= Hedgcoxe War =

Armed uprising of Texas colonists

The Hedgcoxe War of 1852, also known as the Peters colony rebellion, was an armed uprising of Texas colonists protesting what they viewed as an attempt by The Texas Emigration and Land Company (TELC was also known as the Peters Colony), to invalidate their land claims, but was also a conflict between stockholders and land speculators with land certificates worried about market inflation and lowered land value.

On February 10, 1852, the state legislature, in an attempt to satisfy both the colonists and the land company, passed a compromise law. According to its terms all lawsuits were to be withdrawn, the colonists were to be given new guidelines, time would be extended for filing claims, and the state was to give the land company 1,088,000 acres (4,400 km^{2}) of land. Concerned over the large land grant by the Republic of Texas, and worried the company would flood the market and depress land values, colonists and speculators continued their protests.

In May 1852, the agent of the land company, Henry Oliver Hedgcoxe, published an explanatory proclamation that stated the colonists had until August 4, 1852, to establish their claims with him. The proclamation contributed to the colonists' misinterpretation of the compromise law. The colonists were further aroused when the Texas attorney general, Ebenezer Allen, issued an opinion upholding the law. At a mass meeting of colonists in Dallas on July 15, 1852, Hedgcoxe was accused of fraud and corruption by an investigating committee. On July 16, 1852, Dallas's citizen militia group leader, John Jay Good, led about 100 armed men from the mass meeting to both Hedgcoxe's home on Rowlett's Creek in Collin County, and then to his office, which was located along Office Creek in Stewartsville - what is now The Colony, TX (a historical marker currently resides near the original location). Hedgecoxe and his clerk S. A. Venters were warned about the raid and made off with some of the records during their escape. Hedgcoxe's office was burned and a portion of the files were seized by the raiders and removed to the Dallas County Courthouse. Hedgcoxe was ordered to leave the colony. On January 1, 1853, the land company published a conciliatory letter to the settlers. On February 7, 1853, an amendment to the compromise law, satisfactory to both sides, was passed. Except for relatively minor adjustments made in the courts and the legislature over the next ten years, the colonists' title difficulties were ended.

== Bibliography ==
- Seymour V. Connor, The Peters Colony of Texas: A History and Biographical Sketches of the Early Settlers (Austin: Texas State Historical Association, 1959).
- Vertical Files, Barker Texas History Center, University of Texas at Austin (William S. Peters, Peters Colony).
