= The Colony, Texas =

- City
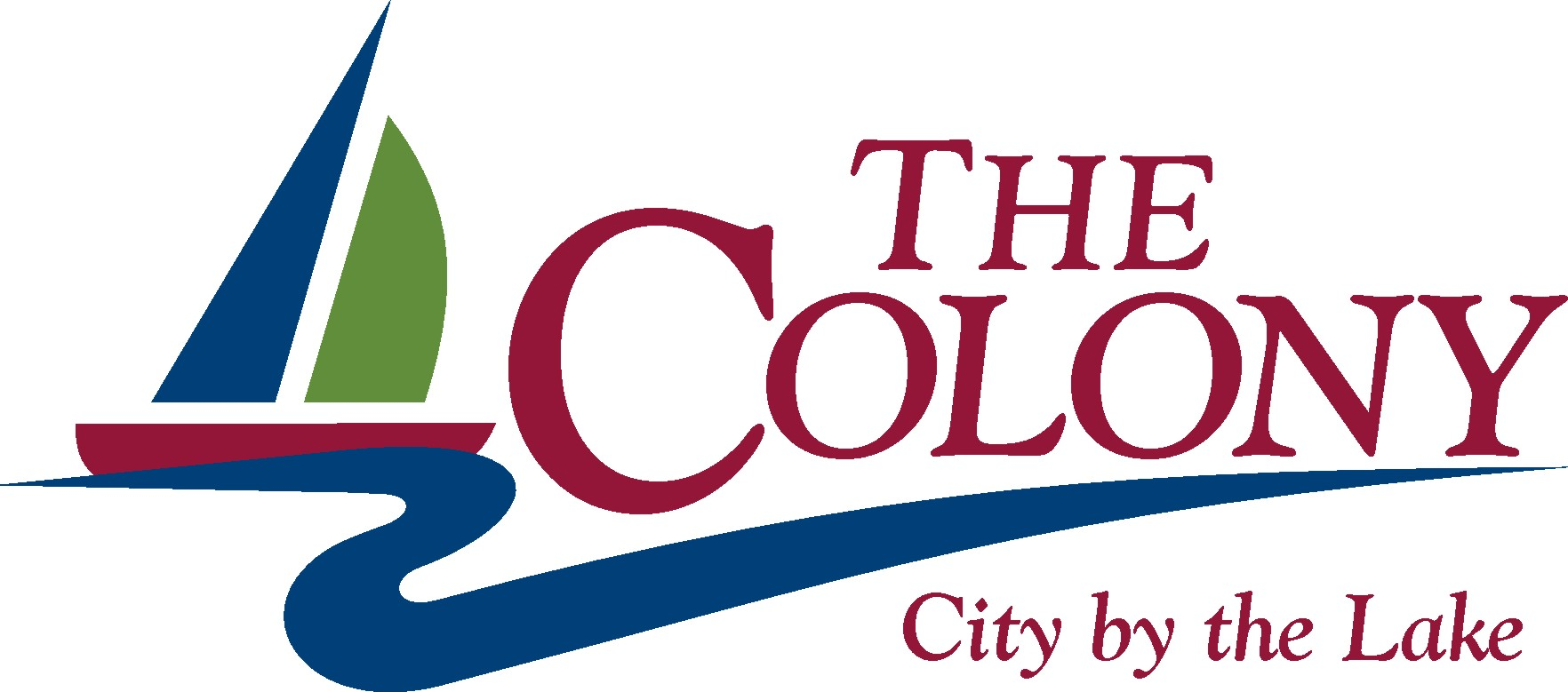
- Seal
- Nickname: City by the Lake
- Location of The Colony in Denton County, Texas
- Coordinates: 33°5′27″N 96°53′5″W
- Country: United States
- State: Texas
- County: Denton

Government
  - Type: Council–manager
  - City council: Richard Boyer, mayor Judy Ensweiler; Robyn Holtz; Brian Wade; David Terre; Perry Schrag; Joel Marks
  - City manager: Troy Powell

Area
  - Total: 16.15 sq mi (41.83 km^{2})
  - Land: 14.01 sq mi (36.28 km^{2})
  - Water: 2.14 sq mi (5.55 km^{2})
- Elevation: 554 ft (169 m)

Population (2020)
  - Total: 44,534
  - Density: 3,172.0/sq mi (1,224.73/km^{2})
- Time zone: UTC-6 (CST)
  - Summer (DST): UTC-5 (CDT)
- ZIP Code: 75056
- Area codes: 214, 469, 945, 972
- FIPS code: 48-72530
- GNIS feature ID: 2412058
- Website: www.thecolonytx.gov

The Colony is a city in Denton County, Texas, United States, and a suburb of Dallas. The population was 44,534 at the 2020 census.

== History ==
The Colony's name comes from the Peters Colony, whose headquarters was located within the modern boundaries of The Colony in the historical community of Stewartsville and the site of the Hedgcoxe War. The Colony is also the site of Bridges Settlement (established during the years of the Republic of Texas and the oldest community in Denton County), Stewarts Creek, Rector, Stoverville and Camey, also known as Camey Spur.

One of the oldest portions of The Colony is Bridges Cemetery, established in 1857 on land owned by the Bridges family. The cemetery gates are closed to the public except on certain dates.

The Colony did not exist until 1973, when home developers Fox and Jacobs purchased 3,000 acres (1,200 ha) around State Highway 121 and Farm to Market Road 423. Its name was chosen because they wanted their development to share a sense of kinship with Texas' early history. They planned the development to be a "dream city" consisting primarily of single-family homes grouped as a "colony". In 1973, Fox and Jacobs agreed with the city of Frisco to begin construction. In 1974, the first model homes were completed and the first families moved into their homes in October.

In 1977, the development was disannexed from the city of Frisco's extraterritorial jurisdiction. The Colony was incorporated in January 1977 and became a home rule city in 1979. Residents chose the name "The Colony" and the name was ratified by the city council in May 1977. In 1987, The Colony voted to merge with the small lakeside community of Eastvale.

== Geography ==
The Colony is located at 33°5′27″N 96°53′5″W (33.090874, –96.884659). According to the United States Census Bureau, the city has a total area of 16.1 square miles (41.7 km^{2}), of which 14.0 square miles (36.3 km^{2}) is land and 2.1 square miles (5.4 km^{2}), or 12.93%, is water.

The city is bordered on the west by Lewisville Lake and the city of Lewisville, on the north and east by Frisco, and on the south by the cities of Carrollton and Plano. Approximately 23 miles (37 km) of shoreline on Lewisville Lake (including two peninsulas) are contained within the city's boundaries, thus providing the basis for the city's nickname "City by the Lake."

== Demographics ==
Historical population
Census	Pop.	Note	%±
1980	11,586		—
1990	22,113		90.9%
2000	26,531		20.0%
2010	36,328		36.9%
2020	44,534		22.6%
2023 (est.)	45,471		2.1%
U.S. Decennial Census

=== Racial and ethnic composition ===
The Colony city, Texas – Racial and ethnic composition Note: the US Census treats Hispanic/Latino as an ethnic category. This table excludes Latinos from the racial categories and assigns them to a separate category. Hispanics/Latinos may be of any race.
Race / Ethnicity (NH = Non-Hispanic)	Pop 2000	Pop 2010	Pop 2020	% 2000	% 2010	% 2020
White alone (NH)	20,552	22,502	23,691	77.46%	61.94%	53.20%
Black or African American alone (NH)	1,358	2,874	4,331	5.12%	7.91%	9.73%
Native American or Alaska Native alone (NH)	172	194	167	0.65%	0.53%	0.37%
Asian alone (NH)	444	2,070	3,910	1.67%	5.70%	8.78%
Native Hawaiian or Pacific Islander alone (NH)	8	26	32	0.03%	0.07%	0.07%
Other race alone (NH)	32	95	182	0.12%	0.26%	0.41%
Mixed race or Multiracial (NH)	446	883	2,193	1.68%	2.43%	4.92%
Hispanic or Latino (any race)	3,519	7,684	10,028	13.26%	21.15%	22.52%
Total	26,531	36,328	44,534	100.00%	100.00%	100.00%

=== 2020 census ===
As of the 2020 census, The Colony had a population of 44,534. There were 10,957 families, and the median age was 35.7 years. 20.8% of residents were under the age of 18 and 9.3% of residents were 65 years of age or older. For every 100 females there were 97.4 males, and for every 100 females age 18 and over there were 95.8 males age 18 and over.

99.7% of residents lived in urban areas, while 0.3% lived in rural areas.

There were 17,742 households in The Colony, of which 29.8% had children under the age of 18 living in them. Of all households, 49.4% were married-couple households, 18.8% were households with a male householder and no spouse or partner present, and 24.2% were households with a female householder and no spouse or partner present. About 26.7% of all households were made up of individuals and 4.5% had someone living alone who was 65 years of age or older.

There were 18,814 housing units, of which 5.7% were vacant. The homeowner vacancy rate was 1.3% and the rental vacancy rate was 9.5%.

Racial composition as of the 2020 census
Race	Number	Percent
White	25,750	57.8%
Black or African American	4,462	10.0%
American Indian and Alaska Native	410	0.9%
Asian	3,936	8.8%
Native Hawaiian and Other Pacific Islander	42	0.1%
Some other race	3,612	8.1%
Two or more races	6,322	14.2%
Hispanic or Latino (of any race)	10,028	22.5%

== Politics ==
The Colony is a home rule municipality with a council-manager form of government. It has a six-member council, with two members elected at large, as well as a city mayor. All meetings of the City Council are open to the public, and meetings are broadcast live on Time Warner Cable government access Channel 16, AT&T Uverse channel 99, as well as on the broadcast page of The Colony's website.

In November 2021, Richard Boyer ran unopposed to become mayor of The Colony, succeeding Joe McCourry who had been mayor of The Colony for 11 years.

=== Council members ===
Name	Place	Term expires	Year started serving on City Council	Concurrently serving on these boards
Richard Boyer	Mayor	Nov. 2024	Mayor since 2021 Place 2 2009-2021 Boyer served on the 4B board for six years (2003) prior to his role on the city council. Also served several positions as a member of the Stephen F. Austin State University Board of Regents.	Hotel Development Corporation; Local Development Corporation; Tax Increment Reinvestment Zone Board #1 and #2
Judy Ensweiler	One (at-large)	Nov. 2024	Place One since 11/2021	
Robyn Holtz	Two (at-large)	Nov. 2024	Place Two since 11/2021	
Brian Wade	Three	Nov. 2023	Place 3 since 11/2014 Wade served for over 12 years as commissioner on The Colony's Planning and Zoning Commission (both chair and vice chair). Prior to that he served on the Parks and Rec Board from 2002 - 2004 when it was dissolved. Brian Wade faced a runoff election in 2020	Hotel Development Corporation; Local Development Corporation;
David Terre	Four	Nov. 2023	05/2011 Terre served on the Planning and Zoning Commission before being elected to the Council. He also currently serves on the Denton County Appraisal board of directors. And he has served as Mayor Pro Tem. Terry faced a runoff election in 2020	Animal Services Advisory Board; Hotel Development Corporation; Local Development Corporation; Tax Increment Reinvestment Zone Board #2
Perry Schrag	Five	Nov. 2023	05/2002 Schrag faced a runoff election in 2020	Hotel Development Corporation; Local Development Corporation; Tax Increment Reinvestment Zone Board #1 and #2
Joel Marks	Six	Nov. 2023	05/2002 Marks is a long-time resident and board member of The Colony. He was elected to place 6 in 1988 and served 3 terms thru 1994. He was re-elected to place 6 in 2002 and has been the place 6 representative since then. He has also held both Mayor Pro Tem and Deputy Mayor Pro Tem positions.	Hotel Development Corporation; Local Development Corporation; Tax Increment Reinvestment Zone Board #1 and #2

The Colony has several Boards and Commissions, all of which list their current members, Term expiration dates, and meeting minutes on The Colony's website. Meetings usually have time setup in the agenda for Citizen input which can be submitted by email or presented in person at most board's meetings. Board applications are available on The Colony's website or at City Hall and a list of currently vacant positions can be found on the site as well.

Board Name	Board Purpose	Overview
Animal Services Advisory Board	The purpose of the board shall be to serve as an advisory body to the City Council with respect to matters concerning regulations for adoption by the City Council and recommendations for animal control.	The board has five members - to include a licensed veterinarian, a municipal official, an animal shelter employee, the supervising captain, and a resident of the City of The Colony.
Board of Adjustment	In communities that have adopted zoning regulations, boards of adjustment serve as a relief valve that can allow for the use of property that is not otherwise permitted under the property’s specific zoning category.	The Board of Adjustment is a quasi-judicial body consisting of five Council appointed members and two alternates. The members of the Board of Adjustment also serve as the Sign Board of Appeal and the Building Standards Commission.
Building Standards Commission	See Board of Adjustment	The members of the Board of Adjustment also serve as the Sign Board of Appeal and the Building Standards Commission.
Capital Improvements Advisory Committee	This committee is appointed by the City Council to serve in an advisory capacity to assist the City Council in adopting land use assumptions, review the capital improvements plans and file written comments, monitor and evaluate implementation of the capital improvement plans, and advise the City of the need to update and revise the land use assumptions. The land use plan and capital improvements plans are as adopted by City Council for imposition of impact fees.	The committee is composed of the Planning and Zoning Commission members and one additional member from The Colony’s Exterritorial Jurisdiction (they are currently seeking to fill that vacancy, must reside in the ETJ).
Community Image Advisory Board	The purpose of the board shall be to serve as an advisory body to the City Council with respect to matters concerning regulations for adoption by the City Council and recommendations for beautification efforts throughout the city. Serves as the Keep The Colony Beautiful Board and Community Image Advisory Board.	The board is made up of seven members, each serving a two-year term.
Community Development Corporation Board	Oversee funds designated for promotion of new or expanded business enterprises through the development of athletic, tourist, and recreational facilities. They conduct public hearings to obtain citizens' input relating to community development projects and may raise funds through issuance of bonds, notes or other debt instruments.	The Community Development Corporation (Type B) Board includes seven members who serve two year terms.
Economic Development Corporation (4A)	The Economic Development board oversees funds designated for the use of improving and developing The Colony's commercial base.	The board is made up of five members who serve three year terms.
Hotel Development Corporation	Aids, assists, and acts on behalf of the city to implement and finance public works, public improvements, and other programs determined by the city.	This board includes nine members each serving two year terms. This board may raise funds through issuance of bonds, notes or other debt instruments. Many of the current members concurrently serve as City Council members.
Keep The Colony Beautiful Board	The purpose of the board shall be to serve as an advisory body to the City Council with respect to matters concerning regulations for adoption by the City Council and recommendations for beautification efforts throughout the city.	Seven members serve two year terms. Serves as the Keep The Colony Beautiful Board and Community Image Advisory Board. Currently there are 3 vacant board positions.
Library Board	The Library Board makes suggestions and recommendations respecting the development of the Library and Library services to the City Council.	There are seven members on the Library Board and each serves a two-year term. The Board also provides advice to the Library Director upon request.
Local Development Corporation	Aids, assists, and acts on behalf of the city to implement and finance public works, public improvements, and other programs determined by the city.	This board includes nine members each serving two year terms. Many of the current members concurrently serve as City Council members.
Planning and Zoning Commission	The planning and zoning commission approves preliminary, final plats and replats, and makes recommendations to the city council on site plans, specific use permits, zoning changes and planned development issues.	The Planning and Zoning Commission is made up of seven citizens who are appointed by the City Council. Appointments are for a two-year term and a member can be reappointed at the term’s expiration. Currently there are two vacant positions, place 3 and 6.
Sign Board of Appeals	See Board of Adjustment	The members of the Board of Adjustment also serve as the Sign Board of Appeal and the Building Standards Commission.
Tax Increment Reinvestment Zone Board		
Board #1	Establishes and provides administration of programs to develop and diversify the economy in Tax Increment Reinvestment Zone Number One, and develop and expand business and commercial activity within the zone.	Meetings as needed, currently consists of several members of the City Council, in addition to two County Representatives. Nine members make up this board and each serves a 2-year term.
Board #2	Establishes and provides administration of programs to develop and diversify the economy in Tax Increment Reinvestment Zone Number Two, and develop and expand business and commercial activity within the zone.	Meetings are as needed; Nine members make up this board and each serves a two-year term. Currently, the Tax board membership consists of the entire City Council (current) plus Two County Representatives.
Technologies Board	The board shall identify rapidly emerging and evolving technologies in the areas of computers, telecommunications, the Internet, data, voice, video, wireless, and other future technologies.	This board includes seven members who serve two year terms. The board provides recommendations (approve / disapprove) on all technology initiatives / purchases / programs prior to any council approval requests.

== Education ==
The Colony is located inside both the Lewisville Independent School District (LISD) and Little Elm Independent School District.

Lewisville ISD has built six elementary schools, two middle schools and one high school inside the city limits. The elementary schools are Peters Colony Elementary, Camey Elementary, B.B. Owen Elementary, Stewart's Creek Elementary (retired 2020–2021), Ethridge Elementary, and Morningside Elementary. The two middle schools are Griffin Middle School and Lakeview Middle School.

Little Elm ISD built Prestwick STEM Academy in 2014, which serves K–8 in The Tribute subdivision, as well as Strike Middle school (opened Fall of 2020) which also serves the residents from The Tribute subdivision. Strike Middle School is named after former superintendent Dr. Lowell H. Strike who served the district for three years.

During a December 2020 meeting of the LISD Board, several changes were made, including rezoning the area and a closure of one of the elementary schools. Effective the end of the 2020–2021 school year, the LISD board voted to close Stewart's Creek Elementary. Many of the students affected by the rezoning will be attending the new school LISD is building to service the area opening for the 2021–2022 school year, dubbed by the LISD Board as Memorial Elementary – STEM Academy. There were three written-in names submitted by the community with no clear winner of the LISD Naming Survey: Sterling (The school's chosen descriptor of students), Cox (name of B.B. Owen Elementary's influential coach and teacher, and supporter of the annual Kids Chase by the Lake), and Josey Lane (The street the school is on). LISD chose to name the school Memorial elementary instead of the submitted names because "...having a Memorial Elementary School will allow us to have the opportunity to memorialize, if you will, a number of important and influential people in the communities we serve.”

Owing to its original history as part of Frisco, The Colony is located inside the community college district of Collin College, unlike most other places in Denton County. However, since residents of The Colony do not pay taxes to said district they must pay out-of-county tuition rates to attend the college.

In May 2009, Griffin Middle School student and The Colony resident Eric Yang won the National Geographic Bee, beating out 54 other state competition champions to win a scholarship and travel package valued at more than $25,000.

The Colony High School is located just north of Texas State Highway 121 on Blair Oaks Drive.

== Transportation ==
- Main lanes: Sam Rayburn Tollway
  - Service roads: State Highway 121
- Farm to Market Road 423
