= Lewisville High School =

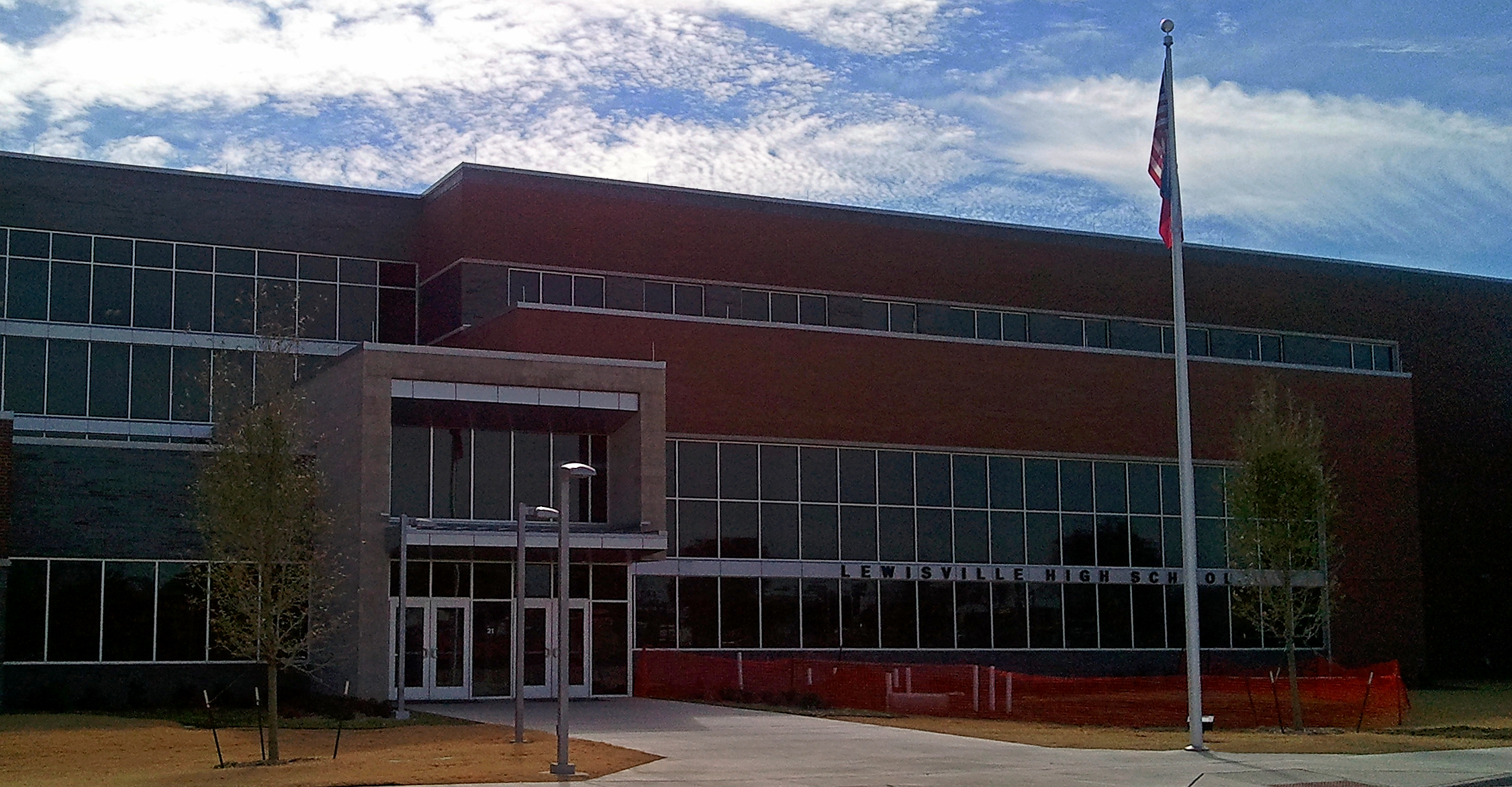
- New building entrance

Location
- 1098 West Main Street; Lewisville, Texas 75067; United States

Information
- Type: Comprehensive Public High School
- Established: 1897
- School district: Lewisville Independent School District
- Principal: Jim Baker (Main Campus), Rachel Flanders (Harmon Campus), Stephanie Gore (Killough Campus)
- Staff: 302.17 (on an FTE basis)
- Grades: Main Campus: 11–12; Harmon Campus: 9–10; Killough Campus: 9–10
- Student to teacher ratio: 13.77
- Colors: Maroon and White
- Athletics: Yes
- Athletics conference: University Interscholastic League 6A
- Mascot: "Big John" our Fighting Farmer
- Team Name: The Fighting Farmers
- Website: lhs.lisd.net

Lewisville High School is a public high school in Lewisville, Texas in the Dallas-Fort Worth area. The oldest of five high schools in the Lewisville Independent School District, it was opened in 1897, making it the only school in the district to have celebrated its 100th anniversary.

The school's colors are maroon and white, and its mascot is "Big John", the Fighting Farmer (a reference to Lewisville's early days as a rural community).

== Campus ==
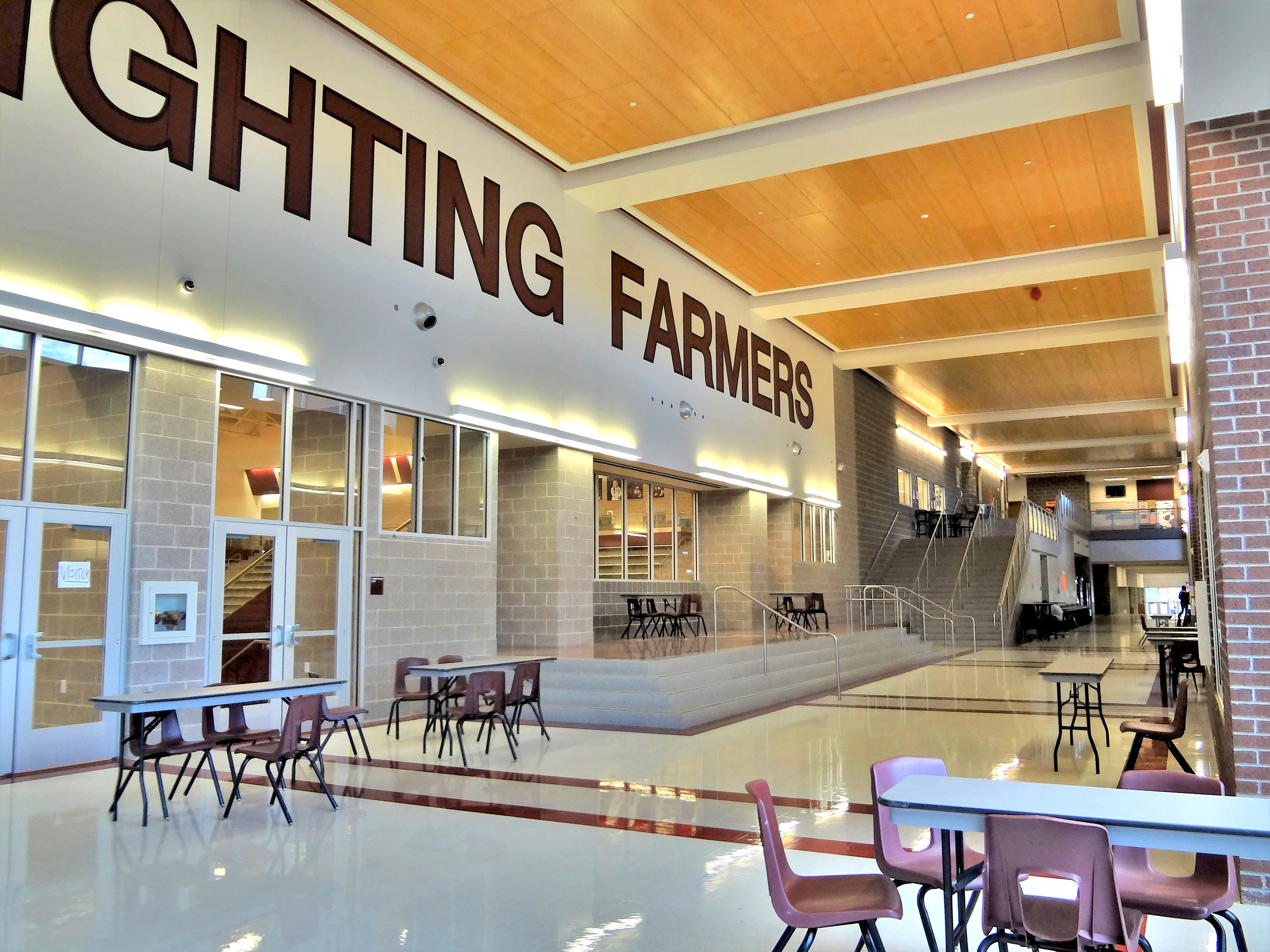
Inside the new Lewisville High School main campus, which opened in 2012

Lewisville High School was originally located on Purnell Street in downtown Lewisville. LHS moved to its current location to Main Street and Valley Parkway in 1968. At that time, the school was located on farmland at the edge of Lewisville. LHS had several additions since then due to the city of Lewisville's large growth. In the 2012-2013 school year, Lewisville High School officially opened its new building immediately adjacent to the old building originally built in 1968 yet still on the same campus. The following school year, a new auditorium opened. The old building's demolition started exactly on the last day of the 2011-2012 school year. The old campus was cleared for the use of additional parking.

Lewisville High School currently consists of three different campuses. Killough Lewisville High School North, "North Campus" and Harmon Lewisville High School South serve ninth and tenth graders. The LHS "Main Campus" primarily serves eleventh and twelfth graders. For extracurricular activities students are shuttled from the Killough and Harmon campuses to the Main campus. Together, their 2014 enrollment was 3,980 students, making LHS the largest high school in the district.

== Feeder schools ==
Lewisville High School has several lower schools it draws students from.

- The four feeder middle schools are:
  - Hedrick
  - Delay
  - Huffines
  - Durham
- The eleven feeder elementary schools are:
  - Central
  - Creekside
  - Degan
  - Hedrick (closed in 2019).
  - Lakeland
  - Mill Street (formerly College Street)
  - Parkway
  - Rockbrook
  - Southridge
  - Valley Ridge
  - Vickery (partial)
  - Lewisville

== Extra curricular activities ==
=== Band ===
Lewisville's marching band has earned a "1" (the best score possible) at the UIL Region Contest every year since 2000. In competitions the marching band sticks to an old-school military marching style, concentrating on marching in lines and blocks, with spartan use of thematic elements.

=== Athletics ===
Lewisville High School athletic teams compete in District 5 of Region I in the University Interscholastic League's 6-A division. One LHS athlete, Track and Field sprinter Earvin Parker, has been named the National High School Athlete of the Year by the National High School Coaches Association. In 2003, Parker ran the fastest 100-meter race and second-fastest 200-meter race in the United States. He was also named to USA Today's All-USA boys track and field team.

==== Football ====
The school's football team were state finalists in 1972, state semifinalists in 1979, and won state championships in 1993 and 1996 (at which time the team was featured on the "Team Cheerios" cereal box). The 1996 Farmer football team set the championship game record for most yards gained on the ground (547, the team did not attempt a single pass during the game), while the combined score of 92 in the game set a new record for most points in an 11-man title game. An earlier team achieved notability for a different reason in 1946, when members of the Fighting Farmer football team chased a bank robber until he was exhausted, allowing for his capture by an unarmed gas station attendants.

==== Softball ====
On June 1, 2013, the Lewisville High School girls' softball team won the University Interscholastic League 5-A state championship by defeating Kingwood High School by a score of 3–2. The team finished fourth in the district's standings at the end of the regular season, prompting many analysts to label the team as an "underdog" throughout the tournament. Prior to the final state tournament in Austin, WFAA journalist Ted Madden wrote "if any team looks like it doesn't belong in Austin, it's this 13-loss team from Lewisville."

==== Baseball stadiums ====
Farmers Field is named after the school's mascot, the "Fighting Farmers." It is located adjacent to the Lewisville High School football field and softball field. It is the home of the Lewisville Fighting Farmers baseball team and the former home of the Lewisville Lizards of the Continental Baseball League. The Lewisville Lizards CBL team was renamed and moved to Texarkana, Texas at the end of the 2007 season.

== Notable alumni ==
- Trinity Benson, 2015, NFL player
- John C. Eastman, 1978, lawyer, professor -attempted to overturn 2020 election results
- Michael Fasusi, 2025, college football offensive tackle for the Oklahoma Sooners
- Roland Fryer, 1995, economist at Harvard University
- Teddy Garcia, 1983, former NFL placekicker
- Walt Garrison, 1962, Dallas Cowboys running back
- Keyonte George, 2022, professional basketball player for Utah Jazz
- Taylen Green, 2021, quarterback for the Cleveland Browns
- Brandon Jefferson, 2010, professional basketball player
- Saeed Jones, 2004, award-winning writer and poet
- Cody Linley, 2008, TV and film actor
- Damien Martinez, 2022, college football running back for the Miami Hurricanes
- Dan Ortmeier, 1999, major league baseball player (2005–2008)
- Stephanie Umoh, 2004, Broadway singer and actress
