= Oldfather =

Oldfather is a surname. Notable people with the surname include:

- William Abbott Oldfather (1880–1945), American classical scholar
- Charles Henry Oldfather (1887–1954), American professor of history of the ancient world
- Irene Oldfather (born 1954), former Scottish Labour Party politician, Member of the Scottish Parliament (MSP) for Cunninghame South 1999–2011
- Dana Oldfather (born 1978), American oil painter and dinnerware designer
