= Rockwall Christian Academy =

Location
- 6005 Dalrock Road; Rowlett, Texas; United States; 32.9139°N 96.5194°W

Information
- Type: Private
- Religious affiliation: Christian
- Established: 1987
- Faculty: 15.9 (on FTE basis)
- Grades: PreK to 12
- Enrollment: 181 (2009–10)
- Student to teacher ratio: 11.4:1
- Website: www.rockwallchristian.org

Rockwall Christian Academy is permanently closed as of Fall 2015. RCA was a private Christian school located in Rowlett, Texas. The school was founded in 1987, and it educated about 180 students in kindergarten to grade 12.
