= Timman =

Timman is the surname of the following notable people:

- Jan Timman (1951–2026), Dutch chess grandmaster
- Ja'far Abu al-Timman (1881–1945), Iraqi revolutionary and politician
- Paul Timman (born 1972), American tattoo artist and dinnerware designer
