= Spring Creek (Collin County, Texas) =

- Map

Physical characteristics
- Source
  - coordinates: 33.068316°N 96.7577389°W
- Mouth
  - coordinates: 32.960075°N 96.6179679°W

Spring Creek is a stream in Collin and Dallas counties, in the United States.

The creek rises in west Plano, flowing south-east passing under the Collin Creek Mall, and major roads including President George Bush Turnpike, U.S. Route 75 before crossing into Dallas County in Garland, passing the Curtis Culwell Center before meeting the Rowlett Creek at State Highway 78.

== See also ==
- List of rivers of Texas
