= Oak Point Park and Nature Preserve =

Park in Plano, TX

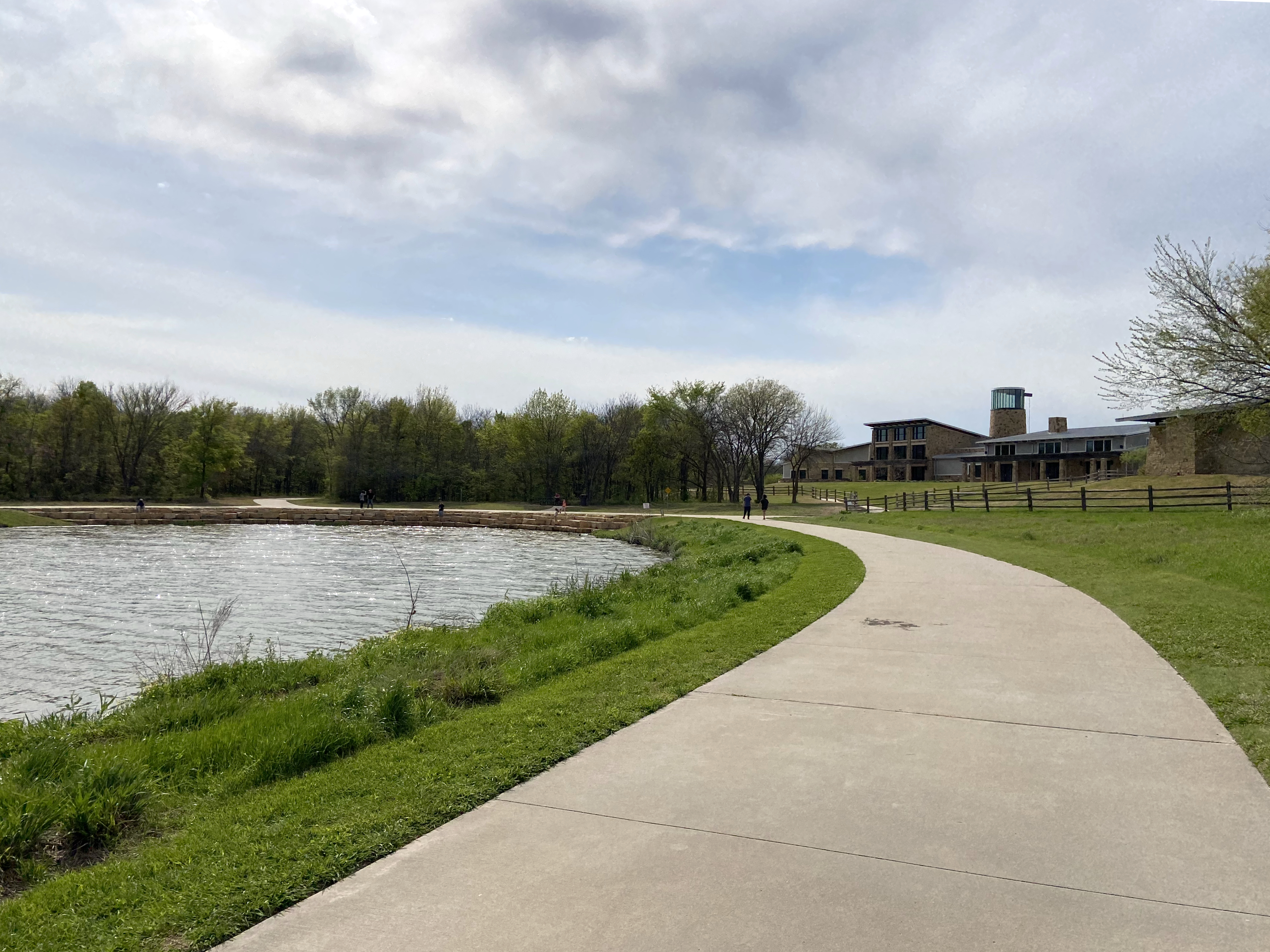
- A pond located near The Nature & Retreat Center at Oak Point Park in Plano Texas
- Interactive map of Oak Point Park and Nature Preserve
- Location: Plano, Texas
- Coordinates: 33°03′27″N 96°40′27″W
- Area: 800 acres (320 ha)
- Website: Official website

Oak Point Park and Nature Preserve is an 800-acre park in Plano, TX and is the largest park in the city.

== Amenities ==
The park has a lake which is open to kayaking, canoeing, and stand-up paddle boarding from sunrise to sunset.

Red Tail Pavilion is an outdoor amphitheater on the southwestern edge of the park that allows visitors to watch shows while enjoying the nature. The venue can hold up to 2500 guests and is the starting point for 5K walks in the park.

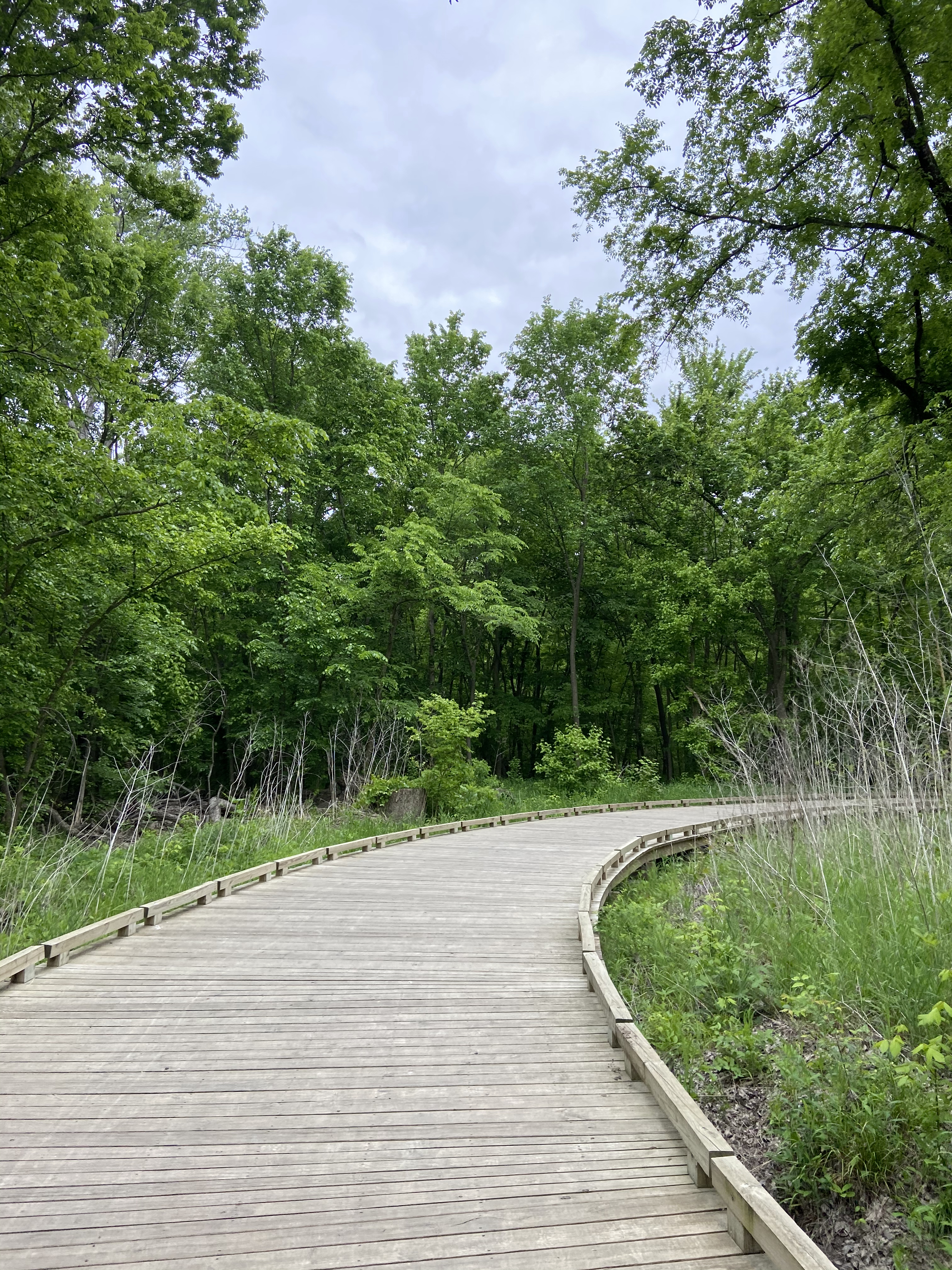
A wooded boardwalk trail in Oak Point Park

The Nature Retreat Center is a 7,000 square-foot gathering place for events and outdoor education. Adjacent to the Nature Retreat Center are public parking, public restrooms, and a pavilion. Nearby Go Ape is a 2-3 hour outdoor experience through the forest with many activities such as zip lines, Tarzan swings, and suspended obstacles like rail tracks.

The yearly Plano Balloon Festival is held at Oak Point Park and includes many activities such as hot air balloon launches, fireworks, and skydiving. While not held inside the park, Plano's "All American 4th" Independence Day celebrations are held at nearby Collin College.

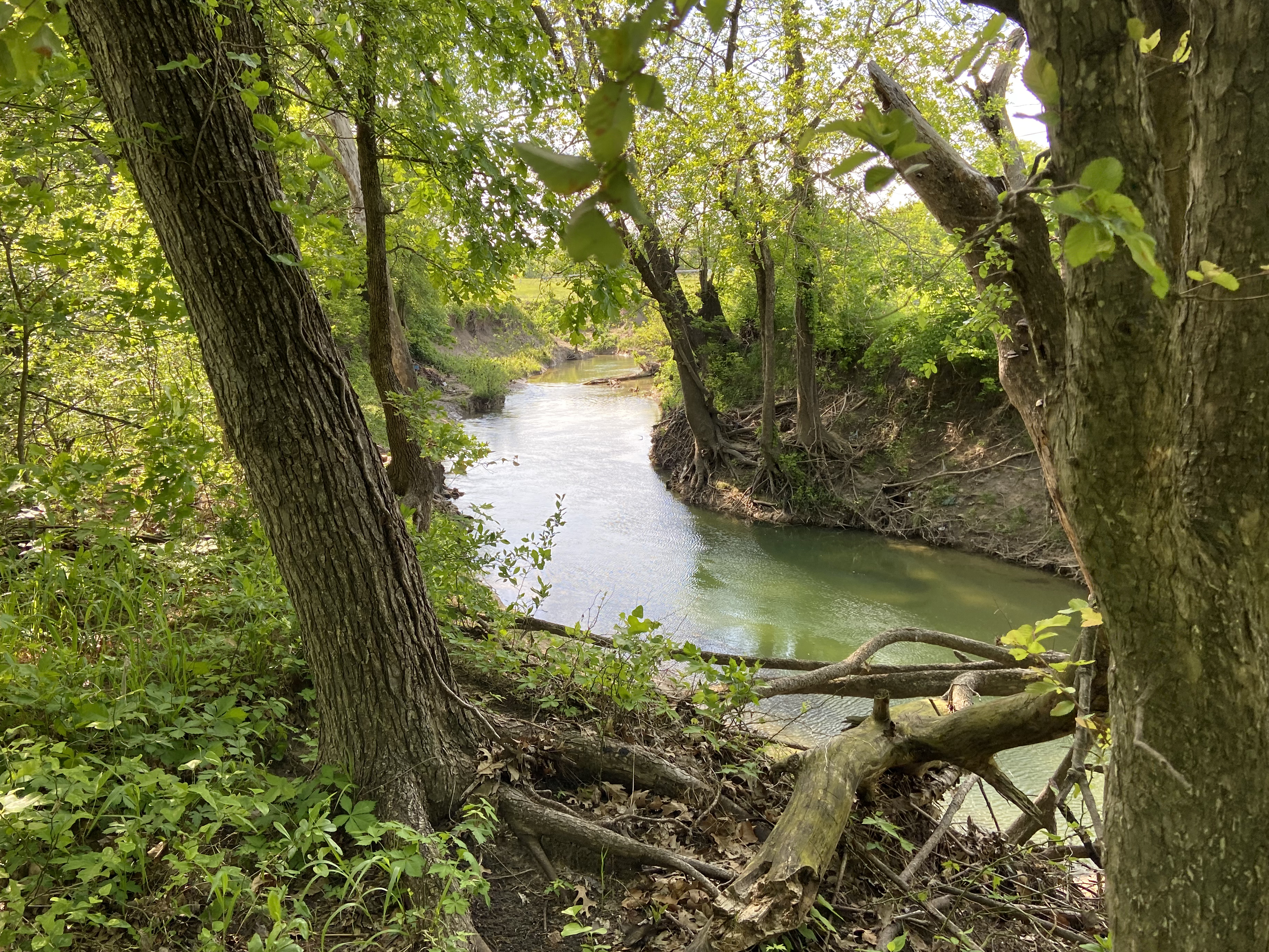
Overlooking Rowlett Creek

There are running/walking activities: 1K, 5K, Half-Marathon, and Relay Race.

On the east side of the park is a 25-acre Blackland Prairie restoration zone. As of 2026, an adjacent area of the park is under construction to add a new parking lot, rented pavilion, restroom facility, and trail improvements. With future completion of construction, there will be a total of 760 acres of undisturbed natural areas and forty acres of developed park amenities.

== Trails ==
The central area of the park has 3.52 miles of concrete trails, of which approximately a mile form a continuous loop around the park's lake. Oak Point has many trail connections to other parks in Plano. The northern extent of the trail connects to the Six Cities Trail in Allen and to Bluebonnet Trail; parts of the trail loop connect westward to Oak Point Recreation Center and Collin College's Plano campus. The southern part of the park's trail runs south via an underpass and connects to Santa Fe Trail and Bob Woodruff Park. The eastern portion of Oak Point's trail passes into the Cottonwood Creek Greenbelt North trail, ending at the Allen city limits.

Oak Point Park has 5 miles of unpaved trails, many of which are located along Rowlett Creek. Some of these trails include Timber Chase trail, Caddo Trail, Old Oaks Trail, and Willow Springs Trail.

In the southeastern region of the park, there is an equestrian area where visitors can ride horses. An "equestrian corridor" connects this area to additional portions of Bob Woodruff Park where horseback riding is permitted. The equestrian area further extends south via an underpass.
