= James R. Gough =

American politician

Member of the Texas House of Representatives
- In office 10 January 1893 – 7 October 1895
- Constituency: Collin County, Texas

Member of the Texas Senate
- In office 12 January 1897 – 21 February 1900
- Preceded by: James S. Sherrill
- Succeeded by: E. W. Harris
- Constituency: District 5

Personal details
- Born: 31 December 1860 Collin County, Texas, US
- Died: November 19, 1916 (aged 55)
- Party: Democrat

James Rowland Gough (December 31, 1860 - November 19, 1916) was a Texan State Senator.

== Early years ==
J. R. Gough was born in Collin County, Texas, on 31 December 1860. His father had been one of the earlier pioneers in Texas, settling in what is now Collin County. His father died in the Battle of Yellow Bayou on 18 May 1864, during the American Civil War.

In February 1883 Gough rented a farm to John Henry Rasor, who had recently moved to Collin Country. Later he sold the farm to Rasor, who became one of the most prosperous farmers in the region. In 1888 Gough was a Justice of the Peace in Precinct No. 1 of Collin County.

== Political career ==
Gough was elected a member of the Texas House of Representatives in the 23rd legislature (10 January 1893 - 9 May 1893) on the Democratic ticket, and reelected in the 24th legislature (8 January 1895 - 7 October 1895). In 1895 he was involved in controversy over the planned world championship boxing contest between James J. Corbett and Bob Fitzsimmons. As Collin County representative he said "Pugilism, like bull fights, does not belong to our age of country, but it is a relic of the dark ages, and is unworthy an enlightened Christian country like ours."

Gough was elected to the Senate as a Democrat for the 25th legislative session (12 January 1897 - 20 June 1897), and was President pro tempore of the Texas Senate. He represented District 5, which covered Collin County and Hunt County, Texas. He was reelected to the Senate for the 26th session (10 January 1899 - 21 February 1900).
