= Yorktown Education =

Educational institute

Coordinates: 33.014118°N 96.803544°W

Yorktown Education was a non-profit private school for students ages 5 through 18 years in Plano, Texas. Established in 2008.it closed in 2022.

== History ==
Yorktown Education was founded in 2008 by Randall Reiners, who spent over four years studying the education industry before launching the school. Reiners felt that private schools were either not reflecting what was needed in today's business environment, or were too costly.

Yorktown Education was first located on the campus of Southern Methodist University in Dallas. It later moved to a larger facility in Plano. In 2016, North Texas organizations including Learning Rx and Discovery Montessori, Pinnacle Montessori, and Heritage Montessori announced a pool of scholarships totalling $1 million, to support students to attend Yorktown Education.

Collin Community College District and Yorktown Education entered a partnership agreement for the academic year 2020–2021 to offer Yorktown Education pupils dual credit coursework for the first two years of college.

Yorktown Education was designed to become the first of a national chain of small, high-quality private schools priced at half the cost per student of today's public school system and most private institutions. However, in 2022, Yorktown Education closed.

== Accreditation ==
Yorktown Education was accredited by AdvancED and was a member of the Educational Research Bureau. Yorktown Education followed a semester system with individualized learning programs, flexible scheduling and dual college credit.
