= Ink Dish =

- Company type: Private
- Industry: Tableware design
- Founded: 2008
- Founder: David Harding, Caroline Pople
- Headquarters: San Diego, California, USA
- Key people: Julie Pople
- Website: www.inkdish.com

Ink Dish is an American tableware design company located in San Diego, California. The company uses designs by contemporary underground artists for their line of porcelain dinnerware. Ink Dish was founded in 2008 by husband and wife David Harding and Caroline Pople.

Julie Pople, mother of Caroline, is the lead designer for Ink Dish. Julie graduated from Liverpool Art College (John Moores University) in 1971 with a degree in Textile Design. Julie was an in-house ceramic designer for Royal Stafford, Burslem, Stoke-on-Trent until becoming the head of design for the European arm of the ceramic company PT Sango.

In 2008, Ink Dish partnered with Paul Timman to create a line of tattoo inspired porcelain dinnerware. "I knew that if I did my job well, I could bridge the gap between mainstream society and help to introduce tattooing into everyday life -- without the process of getting tattooed," says Timman. The Irezumi tableware design by Paul Timman was named to Metropolitan Home's 2009 Design 100 list The design is based on the Japanese style of tattooing known as Irezumi.

In 2010 Ink Dish partnered with modern artists David Palmer and Dana Oldfather. In 2011 Ink Dish had established a partnership with artist Alyson Fox. Ink Dish also designs patterns for tableware manufacturers such as Villeroy & Boch, Macy's, and Corelle. Among the best known of the company's product range are Paul Timman's pattern Cherry Ink, Alyson Fox's pattern December, and Dana Oldfather's pattern Kites.
