= Great Lakes Academy (Texas) =

Private school in Texas, United States

Information
- Grades: 4-12
- Website: www.greatlakesacademy.com

Great Lakes Academy is a private 4th-12th school in Plano, Texas.

Great Lakes Academy is an accredited non-profit private school located in Plano, Texas that offers a positive school experience for students with average to above-average intelligence, diagnosed with various Learning Differences such as autism spectrum disorders, ADD or ADHD.

In 2011 student come from schools within the Plano Independent School District. Increased concerns with demographic changes, state budget cuts, and larger school populations in the Plano ISD schools resulted in increased interest in private schools like Great Lakes from parents living within Plano ISD.
