= Rowlett Creek =

Creek in northern Texas

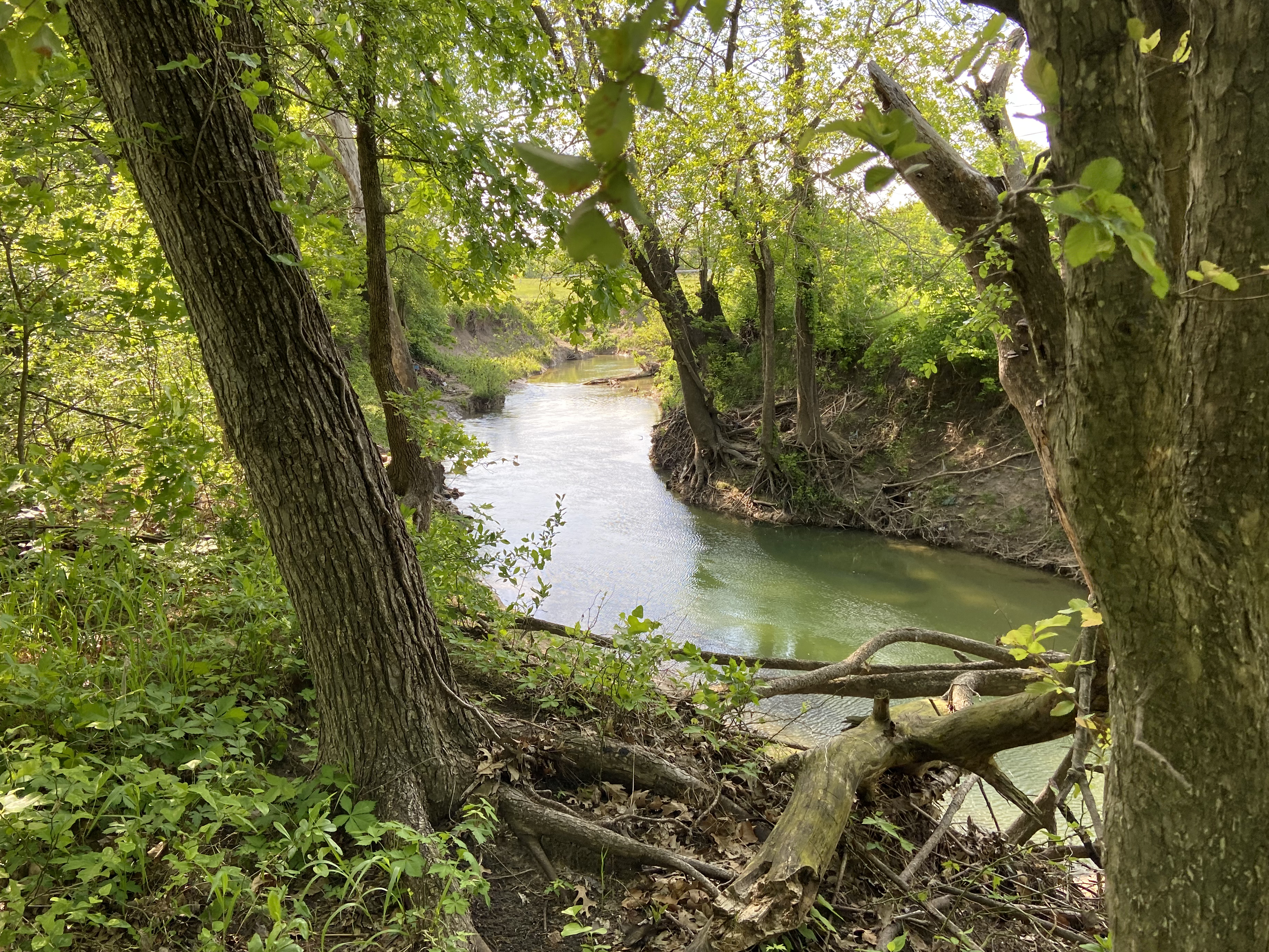
- Rowlett Creek in Oak Point Park, Plano

Location
- Country: United States

Physical characteristics
- Source
  - location: McKinney, Texas
- Mouth
  - location: Lake Ray Hubbard
  - coordinates: 32°53′16″N 96°35′18″W

Rowlett Creek is a creek that flows through Collin, Dallas and Rockwall Counties in Texas.

== Course ==
The creek rises west of McKinney and flows south-east through Rowlett Creek Park before passing under the Sam Rayburn Tollway and into Plano.

In Plano the creek passes through the Oak Point Park and Nature Preserve before continuing south into Breckinridge Park in Richardson and then into Garland where Spring Creek meets it, the creek then diverts in an eastern direction. The creek flows under the President George Bush Turnpike before reaching the Rowlett Creek Dallas County Nature Preserve, here it flows south before reaching Lake Ray Hubbard in Rowlett.

== See also ==
- Oak Point Park and Nature Preserve
