= Agricen =

American biotechnology company

- Type: Private
- Industry: Agribusiness
- Founded: Pilot Point, Texas, 1998
- Headquarters: Plano, Texas, U.S.
- Key people: Michael Totora (President and CEO)
- Products: Agricultural Biologicals / Biostimulants
- Website: Agricen.com

Agricen is a plant health biotechnology company headquartered in Plano, Texas, United States, that produces microbially derived biochemical and biostimulant products for the agriculture, turf and ornamental plant markets.

== History ==
Agricen was founded as Advanced Microbial Solutions in 1998. In July 2012, Agricen entered a strategic partnership with Loveland Products, Inc., a provider of crop input products and part of then publicly traded company Agrium Inc., which is now Nutrien. As part of the agreement, Loveland Products acquired an ownership position in the company. The company’s name was changed to Agricen in early 2013. In August 2014, Agrium (now Nutrien), acquired a controlling interest in Agricen through Loveland Products.

Agricen also operates in Australia under the name Agricen Australia.

== Products ==
Agricen's products, which are manufactured in Denton, Texas and Victoria, Australia, are derived from natural microorganisms and their biochemical byproducts through an industrial fermentation process. Commercially available products in the United States include Accomplish MAX, Extract Powered by Accomplish, Maritime, N-Finity, Terramar, Prologue, and Titan XC, which are distributed by Loveland Products through Nutrien Ag Solutions. In addition, Agricen's products are also available through Nutrien Ag Solutions locations in Canada, Australia and several countries in South America. Agricen also sells proprietary ingredients and products. Agricen's products are primarily marketed as biological and biochemical fertilizer catalysts that increase nutrient availability, improve nutrient efficiency, promote root growth and function, and improve plant health. Products for abiotic crop stress mitigation are also available.

In published university research, Agricen’s product technology has been shown to help ameliorate salt stress in plants, reduce nitrous oxide emissions associated with nitrogen fertilizers, and positively influence plant secondary metabolism.
