= Arbor Hills Nature Preserve =

Nature preserve

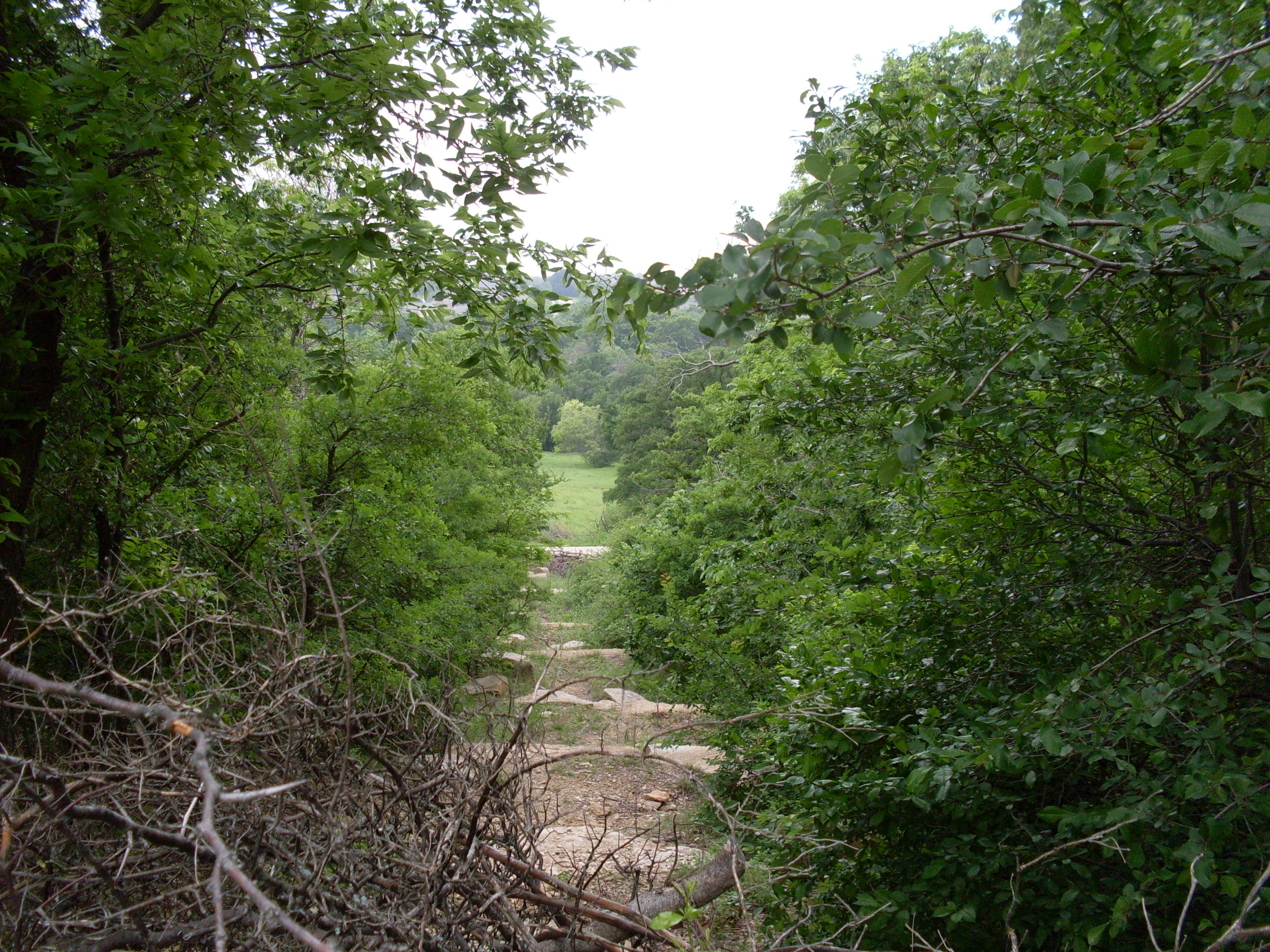
- Arbor Hills Nature Preserve, March 2008
- Interactive map of Arbor Hills Nature Preserve
- Location: Plano, Texas
- Coordinates: 33°02′51″N 96°50′55″W
- Area: 200 acres (81 ha)
- Website: https://www.plano.gov/1397/Arbor-Hills-Nature-Preserve

Arbor Hills Nature Preserve is a 200-acre park in Plano, Texas. It has several amenities including 3 miles of paved hiking trail, 3 miles of unpaved hiking trail, a 2.8 mile off-road bike trail, restrooms, a covered pavilion, and a playground. The pavilion can be reserved for special events. An observation tower provides a bird's eye view of the park. There are three regions in the park: Blackland Prairie, Riparian Forest, and Upland Forest. A pond in the preserve is named after Vasil Levski. Birds that live in the park include killdeer, owls, woodpeckers, egrets, herons, scissor-tailed flycatcher, and turkey vulture. Many other wildlife such as deer, coyotes, snakes, bobcats, turtles, fish, and rabbits also live in the park.
