= Alyson Fox =

American artist

Alyson Fox (born October 8, 1979) is an American artist, illustrator, and dinnerware designer. Fox was one of the first artists to gain notoriety through new media prompting The New York Times to call her "the darling of design blogs".

== Life and career ==
Fox was born in El Paso, Texas. She received a BA in Photography from Florida State University and an MFA from the University of Colorado Fox began her career as a visual director for Anthropologie in Plano, Texas.

In 2005 Fox left retail, and began to focus on illustration. Her "slightly sinister drawings of faceless people and animals" were published by blog Design Sponge and she began to develop a following. "It launched me," said Fox, "I just started getting emails from all these people like The New York Times."

By 2008 Fox's prints were being featured in magazines such as Oprah magazine and Domino did a profile on her in "10 things that make me happy". In 2010 she partnered with housewares company Ink Dish to release a line of porcelain dinnerware. The launch was covered by Design Sponge. She is currently working on a book with Chronicle Books and has a small line of limited designs for sale under the name A SMALL COLLECTION.
