= Rowlett, Texas =

City in Dallas and Rockwall counties in Texas, United States

- City
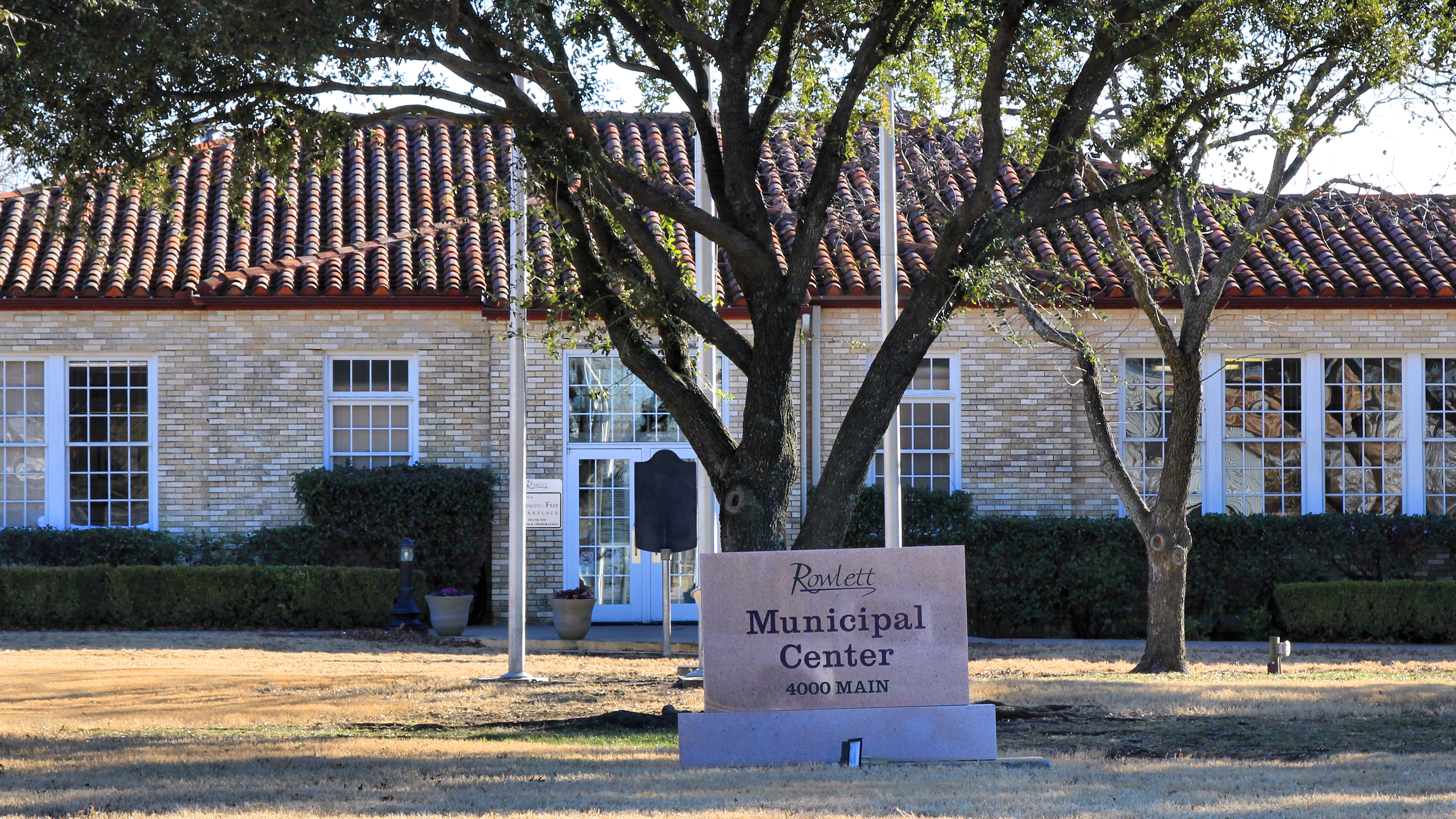
- Rowlett Municipal Building

- Location of Rowlett in Dallas County, Texas

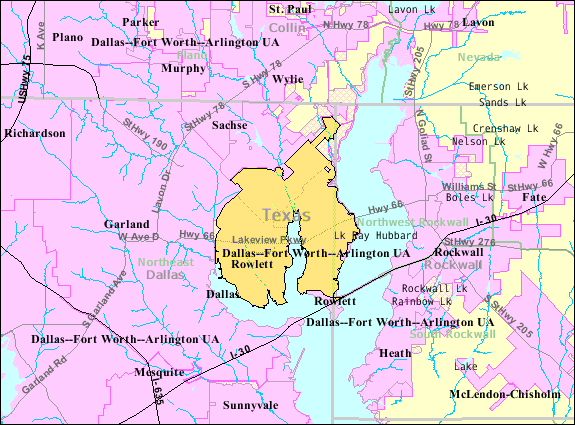
- U.S. Census Map
- Coordinates: 32°54′10″N 96°32′40″W
- Country: United States
- State: Texas
- Counties: Dallas, Rockwall
- Founded: 1840s
- Incorporated: 1952

Government
  - Type: Council-Manager, Home Rule

Area
  - Total: 20.819 sq mi (53.921 km^{2})
  - Land: 20.748 sq mi (53.736 km^{2})
  - Water: 0.071 sq mi (0.184 km^{2})
- Elevation: 459 ft (140 m)

Population (2020)
  - Total: 62,535
  - Estimate (2023): 66,813
  - Rank: US: 573rd TX: 59th
  - Density: 3,220/sq mi (1,243/km^{2})
- Time zone: UTC–6 (Central (CST))
  - Summer (DST): UTC–5 (CDT)
- ZIP Codes: 75030, 75088, 75089
- Area codes: 214, 469, 972, and 945
- FIPS code: 48-63572
- GNIS feature ID: 2411007
- Sales tax: 8.25%
- Website: rowletttx.gov

Rowlett (/raʊˈlɛt/, traditionally /ˈraʊlɪt/) is a city in Dallas and Rockwall Counties in Texas, United States, and an eastern suburb of Dallas. It is a growing, upscale community with nearly $1.5 billion in development in the Dallas–Fort Worth metroplex, located on Lake Ray Hubbard.

The population was 62,535 at the 2020 census, and according to 2023 census estimates, the city is estimated to have a population of 66,813.

== History ==
Rowlett derives its name from Rowlett Creek, which flows into Lake Ray Hubbard and is a major tributary of the east fork of the Trinity River. The creek in turn was named for a waterway running through the property of Daniel Rowlett who moved from Kentucky to Bonham, Texas, in 1835. Daniel, who was a member of the Smoot-Rowlett political family, had no direct dealings with the town that now bears his name.

The first post office opened on April 5, 1880, and it was called "Morris" after Postmaster Austin Morris.

The town was later renamed "Rowlett". The Dallas and Greenville Railway passed through the town in 1886, connecting Dallas with Greenville, Texas, and the Missouri–Kansas–Texas Railroad. Shortly after its opening, the line was formally sold to the MKT.

In 1921, the town was a stop on the Bankhead Highway.

The town incorporated in 1952 when its population was 250. In the 1960s, the town languished as Interstate 30 bypassed Rowlett.

The town has had a building boom since the completion of Lake Ray Hubbard in 1971 – growing to 1,600 by 1973; 10,573 by 1989; 23,260 by 1990; and 44,503 by 2000.

Rowlett gained international notoriety in 1996 when local resident Darlie Routier was convicted of murdering her children as they slept.

In 2003, the town made an unsuccessful formal proposal to get the Dallas Cowboys to move to a 1,000-acre (4.0 km^{2}) "5-Point Park" on the banks of Lake Ray Hubbard when the lease for Texas Stadium expires.

In 2013, the Rowlett City Council was challenged by the Freedom From Religion Foundation and Metroplex Atheists regarding opening prayer invocations at city hall meetings. In a court case in May 2014, the U.S. Supreme Court reaffirmed a previous court ruling (Marsh v. Chambers) upholding the tradition of opening legislative sessions with sectarian prayer and additionally ruled in favor of a town's right to have invocations given by the predominant religion within its borders as long as it did not discriminate or coerce participation. (Town of Greece v. Galloway) Atheist proponents then asked the Rowlett City Council to be included in giving invocations. They were denied based on the Supreme Court ruling and city policy stating the invocation should be given by members of the community's locally established religious congregations."

On the evening of December 26, 2015, a violent storm produced a deadly EF4 tornado that tore a 13-mile path from the neighboring cities of Sunnyvale, Texas and Garland, Texas through the southeast portion of Rowlett, severely damaging or destroying hundreds of homes and vehicles along with several businesses and a city water tower.

On February 8, 2017, the historic water tower on Martha Lane built in 1980 was demolished two years after it suffered damage from the EF4 tornado on December 26, 2015.

In 2019, the City of Rowlett gained regional recognition when Sapphire Bay Development, LLC and the City published plans to construct a master planned community in the middle of the Dallas/Fort Worth Metroplex. The 116-acre development will be Texas' first resort destination anchored by a man-made lagoon, offering guests a luxurious stay along its shore at the 500 room Sapphire Bay Resort, operated and managed by Destination Hotels by Hyatt. The project will also feature a surf village and a water park, 1,500+ residential units, 1.7 million square feet of mixed-use restaurant, retail, entertainment, office and hospitality space, 20+ acres of parks and trails, a 1,000 slip marina.

== Geography ==
According to the United States Census Bureau, the city has a total area of 20.819 square miles (53.92 km^{2}), of which, 20.748 square miles (53.74 km^{2}) is land and 0.071 square miles (0.18 km^{2}), or 1.84%, is water.

Climate data for Rowlett, Texas
Month	Jan	Feb	Mar	Apr	May	Jun	Jul	Aug	Sep	Oct	Nov	Dec	Year
Mean daily maximum °F (°C)	56 (13)	60 (16)	66 (19)	75 (24)	82 (28)	90 (32)	94 (34)	95 (35)	88 (31)	79 (26)	67 (19)	57 (14)	76 (24)
Mean daily minimum °F (°C)	34 (1)	39 (4)	46 (8)	54 (12)	64 (18)	71 (22)	74 (23)	74 (23)	66 (19)	55 (13)	46 (8)	36 (2)	55 (13)
Average precipitation inches (mm)	2.45 (62)	3.09 (78)	3.67 (93)	3.44 (87)	5.17 (131)	4.47 (114)	2.02 (51)	1.85 (47)	3.17 (81)	4.55 (116)	3.55 (90)	3.22 (82)	40.65 (1,032)

== Demographics ==
Historical population
Census	Pop.	Note	%±
1960	1,015		—
1970	2,243		121.0%
1980	7,522		235.4%
1990	23,260		209.2%
2000	44,503		91.3%
2010	56,199		26.3%
2020	62,535		11.3%
2023 (est.)	66,813		6.8%
U.S. Decennial Census; Texas Almanac: 1850-2000; 2020 Census

As of the 2020 census, there were 62,535 people, 21,494 households, and 16,976 families residing in the city, and the population density was 3,014.5 per square mile.

=== Racial and ethnic composition ===
Rowlett city, Texas – Racial and ethnic composition Note: the US Census treats Hispanic/Latino as an ethnic category. This table excludes Latinos from the racial categories and assigns them to a separate category. Hispanics/Latinos may be of any race.
Race / Ethnicity (NH = Non-Hispanic)	Pop 2000	Pop 2010	Pop 2020	% 2000	% 2010	% 2020
White alone (NH)	34,417	34,556	30,294	77.34%	61.49%	48.44%
Black or African American alone (NH)	3,959	7,397	10,871	8.90%	13.16%	17.38%
Native American or Alaska Native alone (NH)	164	228	245	0.37%	0.41%	0.39%
Asian (NH)	1,473	3,649	4,964	3.31%	6.49%	7.94%
Native Hawaiian or Pacific Islander alone (NH)	24	14	33	0.05%	0.02%	0.05%
Other race alone (NH)(NH)	53	84	237	0.12%	0.15%	0.38%
Mixed race or Multiracial (NH)	514	986	2,634	1.15%	1.75%	4.21%
Hispanic or Latino (any race)	3,899	9,285	13,257	8.76%	16.52%	21.20%
Total	44,503	56,199	62,535	100.0%	100.0%	100.00%

=== 2020 census ===
As of the 2020 census, the median age was 38.7 years. 23.4% of residents were under the age of 18 and 12.8% of residents were 65 years of age or older. For every 100 females there were 95.1 males, and for every 100 females age 18 and over there were 91.5 males age 18 and over.

99.8% of residents lived in urban areas, while 0.2% lived in rural areas.

There were 21,494 households in Rowlett, of which 37.4% had children under the age of 18 living in them. Of all households, 60.7% were married-couple households, 12.6% were households with a male householder and no spouse or partner present, and 21.4% were households with a female householder and no spouse or partner present. About 16.7% of all households were made up of individuals and 5.7% had someone living alone who was 65 years of age or older.

There were 22,371 housing units, of which 3.9% were vacant. The homeowner vacancy rate was 1.1% and the rental vacancy rate was 8.6%.

Racial composition as of the 2020 census
Race	Number	Percent
White	33,176	53.1%
Black or African American	11,060	17.7%
American Indian and Alaska Native	481	0.8%
Asian	5,029	8.0%
Native Hawaiian and Other Pacific Islander	41	0.1%
Some other race	4,218	6.7%
Two or more races	8,530	13.6%
Hispanic or Latino (of any race)	13,257	21.2%

== Education ==
=== Primary and secondary schools ===
The Dallas County portion of Rowlett is served by the Garland Independent School District, while the Rockwall County portion is a part of the Rockwall Independent School District.

Back, Stephens, Dorsey, Giddens-Steadham, Herfurth, Keeley, Pearson, Rowlett, Cullins-Lakepoint and Liberty Grove Elementary Schools, Coyle and Schrade Middle Schools, and Rowlett High School are located within the city boundaries of Rowlett.

Garland ISD has a free choice program that allows for a student to attend any school within the district. If a school is already full with students that are zoned for that school, then students who are not zoned for that school but chose the school on their choice of school form, will not be able to attend. The student will then be enrolled in their second or third choice school unless only the school they are zoned for is available. If students choose to attend a school located outside of where they are zoned the GISD is unable to provide a school bus service. Students living within two miles of their school cannot receive bus service either.

Not all students in Rowlett are zoned for Rowlett HS. A considerable portion are zoned for Sachse High School in the city of Sachse. Rockwall ISD residents are zoned to Cullins-Lake Pointe Elementary School, Williams Middle School and Rockwall High School.

=== Colleges and universities ===
Residents in Dallas County are zoned to Dallas College (formerly the Dallas County Community College District or DCCCD). Residents in Rockwall County are zoned to Collin College.

== Transportation ==
DART has transit that runs to and from Dallas. Rowlett is served by the Downtown Rowlett station on the Blue Line. Automobile routes include President George Bush Turnpike, Interstate 30, and Texas State Highway 66 (Lakeview Pkwy).

== See also ==
- List of municipalities in Texas
