= Smoot–Rowlett family =

American political family

The Smoot–Rowlett family is a U.S. political family. It is linked by marriage to the Kimball–Snow–Woolley family.

== Family members ==
=== Daniel Rowlett ===
- c.1786 - 2 Dec 1847
- Texas Republic House of Representatives, 1837–38, 1839–40, 1843–44
- Namesake of Rowlett, Texas
- Brother of Joseph Rowlett
- Uncle of Abraham Owen Smoot

=== Joseph Rowlett ===
- Kentucky State House of Representatives, 1838–50
- Brother of Daniel Rowlett
- Uncle of Abraham Owen Smoot

=== Abraham Owen Smoot ===
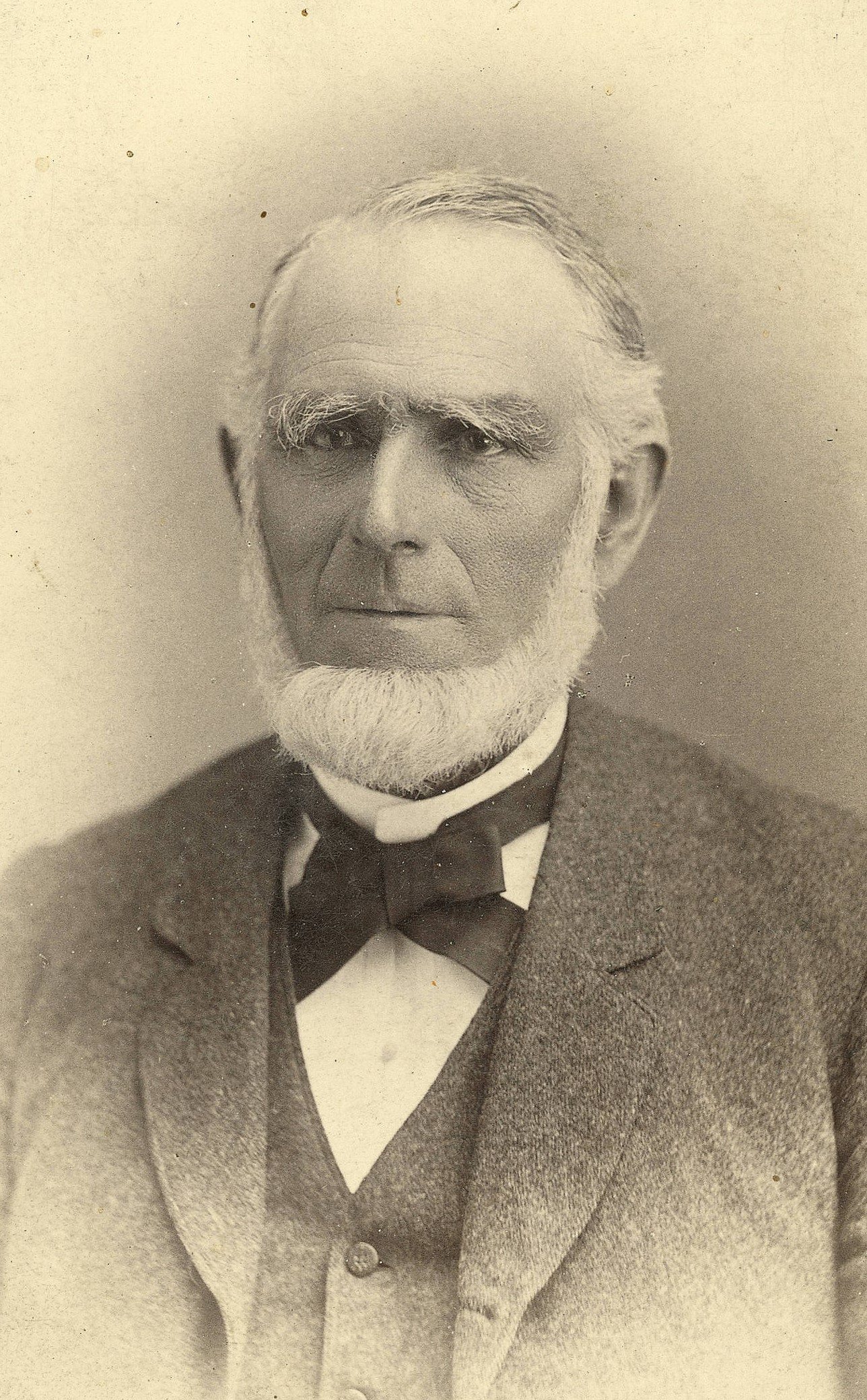
Abraham O. Smoot

- February 17, 1815 - March 6, 1895
- Mayor of Salt Lake City, Utah, 1857–66
- Mayor of Provo, Utah, 1868–81
- First Head of the board of trustees of Brigham Young Academy
- Stake president in Provo
- Major benefactor of Brigham Young Academy, later Brigham Young University
- Nephew of Daniel Rowlett
- Nephew of Joseph Rowlett
- Uncle of Emma Smith, who married Wilford Woodruff
- Father of Abraham Owen Smoot
- Father of Reed Smoot
- Father of Zina Beal Smoot, who married Orson Ferguson Whitney
- Grandfather of Abraham Owen Smoot III
- Grandfather of Isaac Albert Smoot

=== Abraham Owen Smoot ===
- March 11, 1856 - May 22, 1911
- Member of Utah State Senate
- Son of Abraham Owen Smoot (1815-1895)
- Half-brother of Reed Smoot
- Father of Abraham Owen Smoot III
- Father of Isaac Albert Smoot

=== Reed Smoot ===
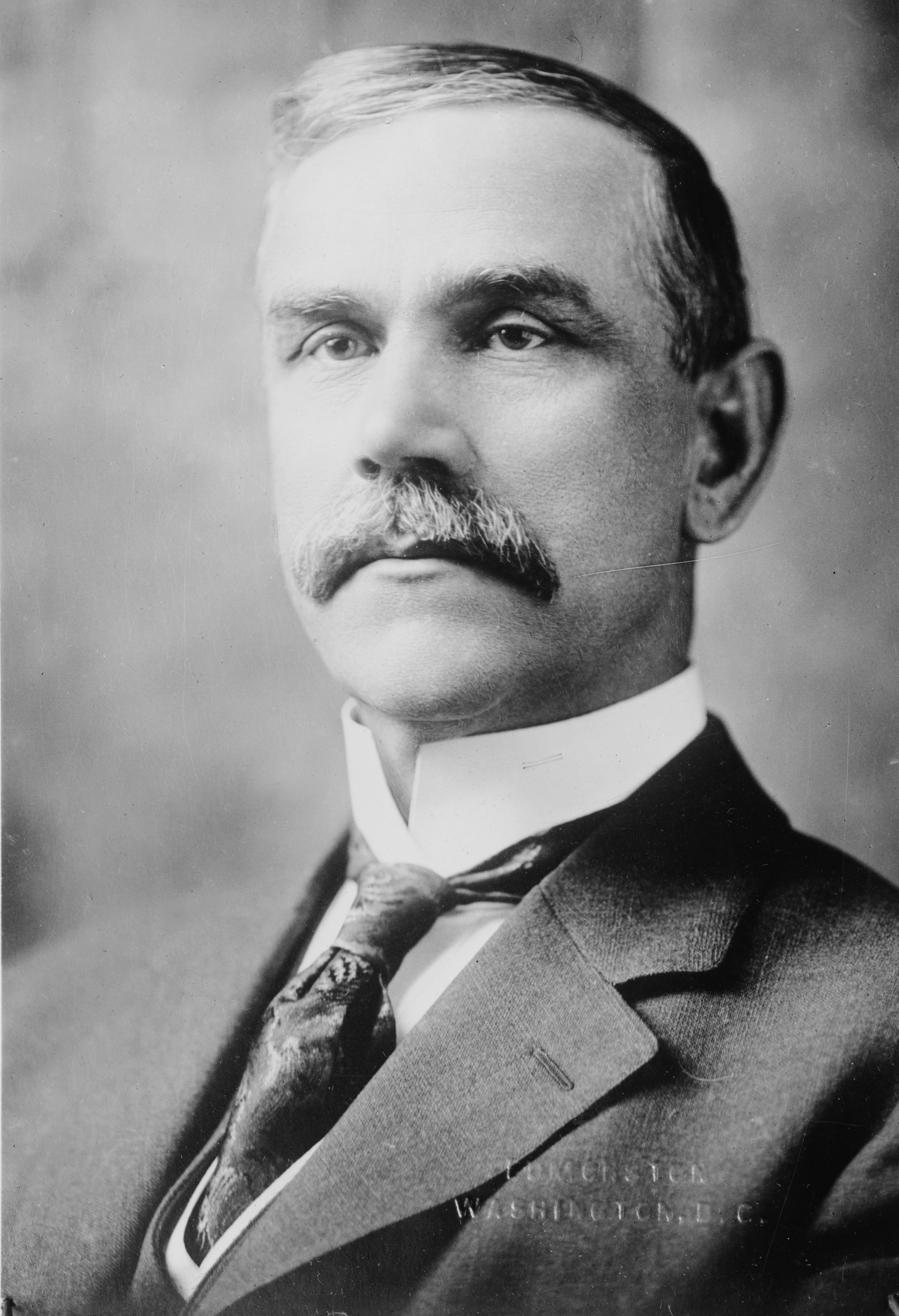
Reed Smoot

- January 10, 1862 - February 9, 1941
- U.S. Senator from Utah, 1903–33
- Delegate to Republican National Convention from Utah, 1908, 1912, 1920, 1924, 1928, 1932
- Member of Republican National Committee from Utah, 1912–20
- Son of Abraham Owen Smoot (1815-1895)
- Half-brother of Abraham Owen Smoot (1856-1911)
- Half-uncle of Abraham Owen Smoot III
- Half-uncle of Isaac Albert Smoot

=== Abraham Owen Smoot III ===
- September 9, 1879 - 1937
- Mayor of Provo, Utah, 1934–35
- Grandson of Abraham Owen Smoot (1815-1895)
- Son of Abraham Owen Smoot (1856-1911)
- Half-nephew of Reed Smoot
- Brother of Isaac Albert Smoot

=== Isaac Albert Smoot ===
- Born: November 3, 1880.
- Member of Utah State House of Representatives, 1928–32
- Grandson of Abraham Owen Smoot (1815-1895)
- Son of Abraham Owen Smoot (1856-1911)
- Half-nephew of Reed Smoot
- Brother of Abraham Owen Smoot III

=== Wilford Woodruff ===
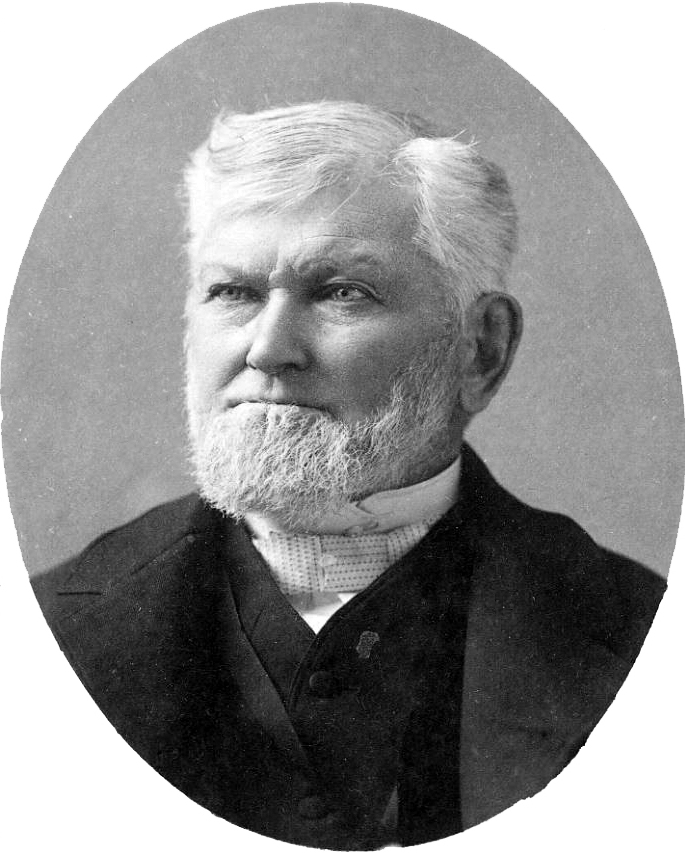
Wilford Woodruff

- 1 Mar 1807 - 2 Sep 1898
- Utah Territorial Legislature 1854
- Father of Newton Woodruff
- He married Emma Smith, niece of Abraham Owen Smoot (1815-1895)
- Fourth President of the Church of Jesus Christ of Latter-day Saints 1889-1898

=== Newton Woodruff ===
- 3 Nov 1863 - 21 Jan 1960
- Mayor of Smithville, Utah 1900
- Son of Wilford Woodruff and Sarah Brown
