= Tyler Ewing =

American television composer

- Born: September 14, 1984 (age 41) Plano, Texas, U.S.
- Origin: United States
- Genres: Television
- Occupation(s): Composer, Music producer
- Instrument(s): Piano, Cello, Guitar, Bass
- Years active: 2005–present

Tyler Ewing (born September 14, 1984) is an American television composer. He is best known for his work with Guiding Light, As the World Turns, The Oprah Winfrey Show, and The Nate Berkus Show. In 2007 he composed the Fight Song for his alma mater, Belmont University.

== Partial discography ==
- Jim Brickman: Romanza (2011 – Cello, Assistant Engineering)
- Jim Brickman: All is Calm (2011 – Cello)
- Eric Michael: The Wedding Song EP (2011 – Producer, Piano, Cello)
- Ben Utecht: Christmas Hope – An Inspirational Holiday Collection (2011 – Cello, Assistant Engineer, String Engineer)
- Eric Michael: Beginnings (2007 – Producer, Programming)
