= John Henry Rasor =

- John Henry Rasor in 1880
- Born: 22 November 1849; Indiana, USA
- Died: 5 November 1925 (aged 75); Plano, Texas, USA
- Occupation: Rancher
- Known for: Rasor Elementary School

John Henry Rasor (22 November 1849 - 5 November 1925) was a Plano, Texas, United States cotton farmer.

== Life ==
John Henry Rasor was born on 22 November 1849 in Indiana. He moved to Meade County, Kentucky, where he married Mary Ratchford. The couple were to have ten sons and two daughters. They moved to Iowa, and then in February 1883 moved to Texas, where Rasor rented a farm near Plano, Texas from Texas State Senator James R. Gough. Later he bought the farm and other land around it.

The Rasors were largely self-sufficient. They grew their own vegetables, corn and wheat in the fertile Texas blackland prairies soil, and collected wild fruit and nuts. Depending on the season, they hunted for wild hogs that lived by the creeks, and for squirrels, and deer. Contrary to claims that the Rasors also hunted American Bison and American Black Bear, the ranges of those animals by the 1880s in Texas makes such claims highly unlikely, bison being exterminated in the Plano area thirty years prior to the Rasors' emigration. They dried and preserved the meat for later use. Later they raised their own hogs. The Rasors also raised cattle. Rasor was an extremely capable farmer, running a profitable operation and plowing back his profits into expanding the ranch.

The Rasor family played a significant role in the cotton industry, with what became one of the largest operations in the area. Their ranch grew to cover nearly 4,000 acres (1,600 ha), with huge silos, barns and feedlots. They even had their own smithy. The ranch lay on both sides of what is now called Independence Parkway. At its largest extent the ranch included most of the area between Hedgcoxe Road and Highway 121 from Preston Road to Alma Road.

John Henry Rasor died at his home on 5 November 1925 at the age of 75.

== Recognition ==
In the early 1900s, a dirt road was renamed Rasor Road by Collin County. In the early 1990s, the City of Plano changed that name to Headquarters Drive, but by 2002, the City Council voted 6-2 to reverse the change and call a section of the road Rasor Boulevard. It currently extends from Preston Road to SH 121/SRT, changing to Headquarters Drive west of Preston Road and to Hillcrest Road north of SH 121/SRT.

In 2003, the City of Plano dedicated William Henry "Buzz" Rasor Park on McDermott Road, just west of Coit Road, after one of John Henry Rasor's grandsons. Buzz had served on the Frisco Independent School District school board and was known for warning the school system in the 1950s and 1960s to prepare for massive growth and the transformation of the sleepy farming town into a large suburb (his vision began to come true in the 1990s). He was often quoted as saying "Coit Road won't end until it reaches Oklahoma." He also sponsored the area's first Little League and was a major benefactor of Future Farmers of America.

In 2004 Rasor Drive, a residential street, was named in honor of the Rasor family in Frisco, Texas.

John Henry Rasor is commemorated by the Rasor Elementary school in Plano.

== Sources ==
- "About John Henry Rasor". Plano Independent School District. 9 February 2012. Archived from the original on 16 February 2013.
- Cline, Janice Craze (2012-08-13). Historic Downtown Plano. Arcadia Publishing. ISBN 978-0-7385-7902-3.
- "J.H. Rasor Passes Away". Star-Courier. 1925-11-05. Archived from the original on 2013-02-24.
- "John Henry Rasor, 1880". Plano Public Library System.
- Plano, Texas: The Early Years. Friends of the Plano Public Library System. 1 January 1986. ISBN 978-0-9651841-0-6.
