= Plano Balloon Festival =

Annual event in Plano, Texas

Coordinates: 33.0528°N 96.6738°W

Plano Balloon Festival is held each September at Oak Point Park and Nature Preserve in the city of Plano, Texas. It is one of the city's largest celebrations.

The events typically includes five hot air balloon launches, a Kids Fun Zone, a stage showcasing local community acts, live bands Friday and Saturday night, sky divers, fireworks, and balloon night glows.

The festival was cancelled in 2018 because of heavy rains and flooding. It was also cancelled in 2020 and 2021 from the COVID-19 pandemic. It returned in September 2022.

== See also ==
- Hot air balloon festivals
