= Paul Timman =

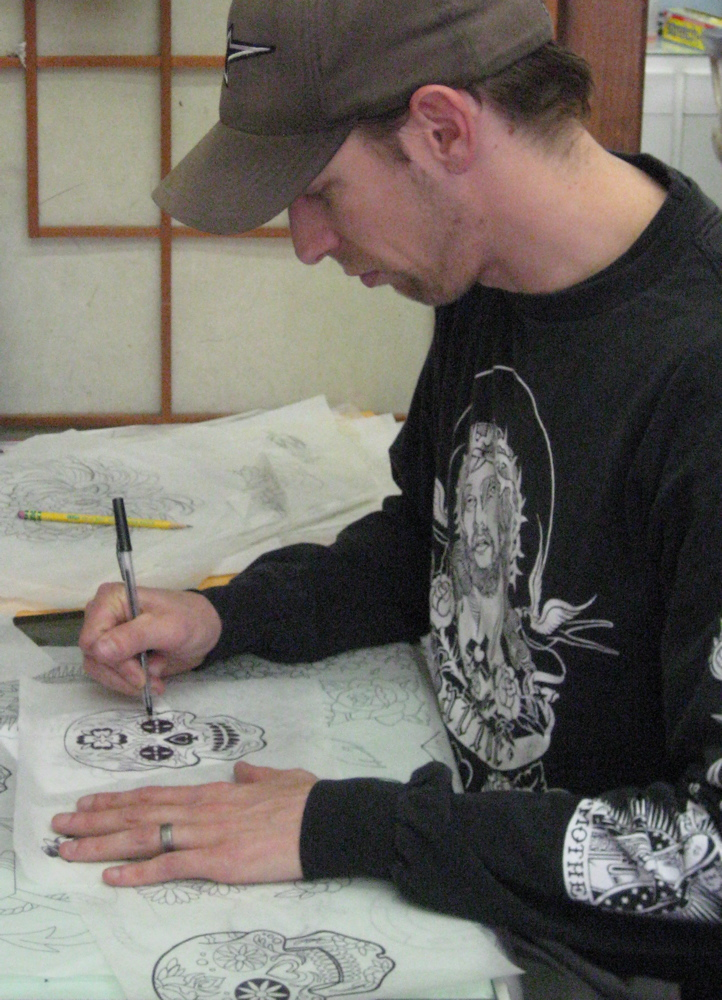
- Paul working at Sunset Strip Tattoo in Hollywood
- Born: Paul Patterson Timman; September 26, 1972 (age 54); Toledo, Ohio, United States
- Education: B.A. Sculptured Glass Cleveland Institute of Art
- Known for: Tattoo artist
- Movement: Traditional Japanese, tribal
- Awards: Best sleeve - Inkslingers Ball, 2009 Design 100 Metropolitan Home
- Patrons: Angelina Jolie, Ben Affleck

Paul Patterson Timman (born September 26, 1972) is an American tattoo artist and award winning dinnerware designer. Paul's tribal designs, hand painted tattoo work in movies and celebrity clients have made him one of the "giants in the industry" called the 'Rembrandt of Sunset Strip' by The Wall Street Journal. Timman's work has been featured in tattoo magazines in the USA and internationally including: Inked (magazine), Tattoo Magazine, and Skin Art.

== Early years ==
Timman was born in Toledo, Ohio in 1972 and spent most of his young life in the region. He graduated from the Cleveland Institute of Art in 1995 with a degree in sculptured glass. He began tattooing after being encouraged by friends. "I was going to art school and getting tattooed, so it just made sense. A friend had some equipment and I got nominated by some buddies to tattoo them."

== Career ==
He began tattooing out of his apartment in Cleveland, but quickly outgrew his premises and got a job at the Toledo Tattoo Company, the oldest tattoo studio in the region. In 1997 Timman moved to Los Angeles and got a job at one of the most famous tattoo parlors in the world, Sunset Strip Tattoo in Hollywood.

=== Hollywood ===
While working at Sunset Strip Tattoo, Timman acquired a number of celebrity clients. Notable tattoos include a tribal dragon on Angelina Jolie's lower back, a cross on Ben Affleck's biceps, a large tribal tattoo on Busta Rhymes's back, a ring on Pamela Anderson's finger, a banner design on Mark Wahlberg, and a magic mushroom on Billy Bob Thornton.

Timman's client list has led to work in film, television, and commercials painting temporary tattoos, and giving technical advice on the industry. Television credits include: HBO's Big Love and Mad About You. Advertising campaigns include Dunlop Tires and the "Fairy Snapmother" for Slim Jim (snack food).

Timman currently works on the Sunset Strip as an acknowledged specialist in tribal work, traditional Japanese and Americana designs.

=== TV appearances ===
Since 2000 Timman has been featured on multiple television programs. Appearances include: the Pamela Anderson True Hollywood Story, VH1's All Access: Where the stars get their tats in L.A. where he talked about his celebrity encounters, from making house calls to Jennifer Lopez and Marc Anthony's home to tattooing Tommy Lee at his kitchen table. He was also featured on A&E's The Star Treatment: "Meet Paul Timman, who talks about creating tattoos for Drew Barrymore and Angelina Jolie".

=== Dinnerware Design ===
In 2008 Paul Timman partnered with Ink Dish to create a line of porcelain dinnerware. "I knew that if I did my job well, I could bridge the gap between mainstream society and help to introduce tattooing into every day life -- without the process of getting tattooed," says Timman.

Paul's Irezumi design was named to Metropolitan Home's 2009 Design 100 list. The design "is based on the Japanese style of tattooing known as Irezumi. Vibrant dragons, colourful Koi, cherry blossoms and waves weave together organically to exhibit this ancient style of tattooing, blending in the same way on porcelain as they would on a body." The dinnerware is sold at Fred Segal and other retailers.
