= Dana Oldfather =

American designer (born 1978)

Dana Oldfather (born November 30, 1978) is an American oil painter and dinnerware designer often linked to Cleveland's artistic resurgence.

== Life and career ==
Dana was born in Cleveland, OH. She is a self-taught artist but has listed Willem de Kooning and Yoshitomo Nara as influences.

Dana's work has been shown in galleries and museums across the United States, including POV Evolving Gallery in Los Angeles, CA, and The Bonfoey Gallery in Cleveland, OH.

In 2010 Dana partnered with housewares company Ink Dish. Dana created a line of dinnerware based on her Kites painting, which was subsequently featured in The New York Times under the heading Design Firm Turns Dinnerware Into Works of Art.

In April 2011 she was awarded a residency at the Vermont Studio Center. Oldfather is currently represented by the eo art lab in Chester, Connecticut.

Dana Oldfather's work is in corporate collections such as Jones Day, Vdara Hotel in Las Vegas, The Cleveland Clinic, and the Progressive Art Collection. She still lives and works in Cleveland, Ohio.
