= Plano, Texas =

Plano
- City
- Legacy West Downtown Plano

- Flag Logo
- Interactive map of Plano
- Location within Texas Location within the United States
- Coordinates: 33°03′01″N 96°41′56″W
- Country: United States
- State: Texas
- Counties: Collin, Denton
- Incorporated: June 2, 1873

Government
  - Type: Council-Manager
  - Mayor: John B. Muns

Area
  - Total: 72.04 sq mi (186.59 km^{2})
  - Land: 71.69 sq mi (185.67 km^{2})
  - Water: 0.36 sq mi (0.93 km^{2})
- Elevation: 715 ft (218 m)

Population (2020)
  - Total: 285,494
  - Estimate (2025): 293,028 ▲
  - Density: 4,013.0/sq mi (1,549.42/km^{2})
  - Demonym: Planoite
- Time zone: UTC−6 (CST)
  - Summer (DST): UTC−5 (CDT)
- ZIP Codes: 75023-26, 75074-75, 75086, 75093-94
- Area codes: 214, 469, 945, 972
- FIPS code: 48-58016
- GNIS feature ID: 2411437
- Website: plano.gov

Plano (/ˈpleɪnoʊ/ PLAY-noh; Spanish for 'flat surface') is a city in the U.S. state of Texas, where it is the largest city in Collin County. A small portion of Plano is located in Denton County. Plano is one of the principal suburbs of the Dallas–Fort Worth metroplex. With a population of 285,494 at the 2020 census, it is the ninth most-populous city in Texas, and, respectively, the 74th most populous city in the United States.

Plano serves as an important hub of the economy of Dallas. It is home to the headquarters of Frito-Lay, JCPenney, Pizza Hut, and Toyota Motor North America.

== History ==
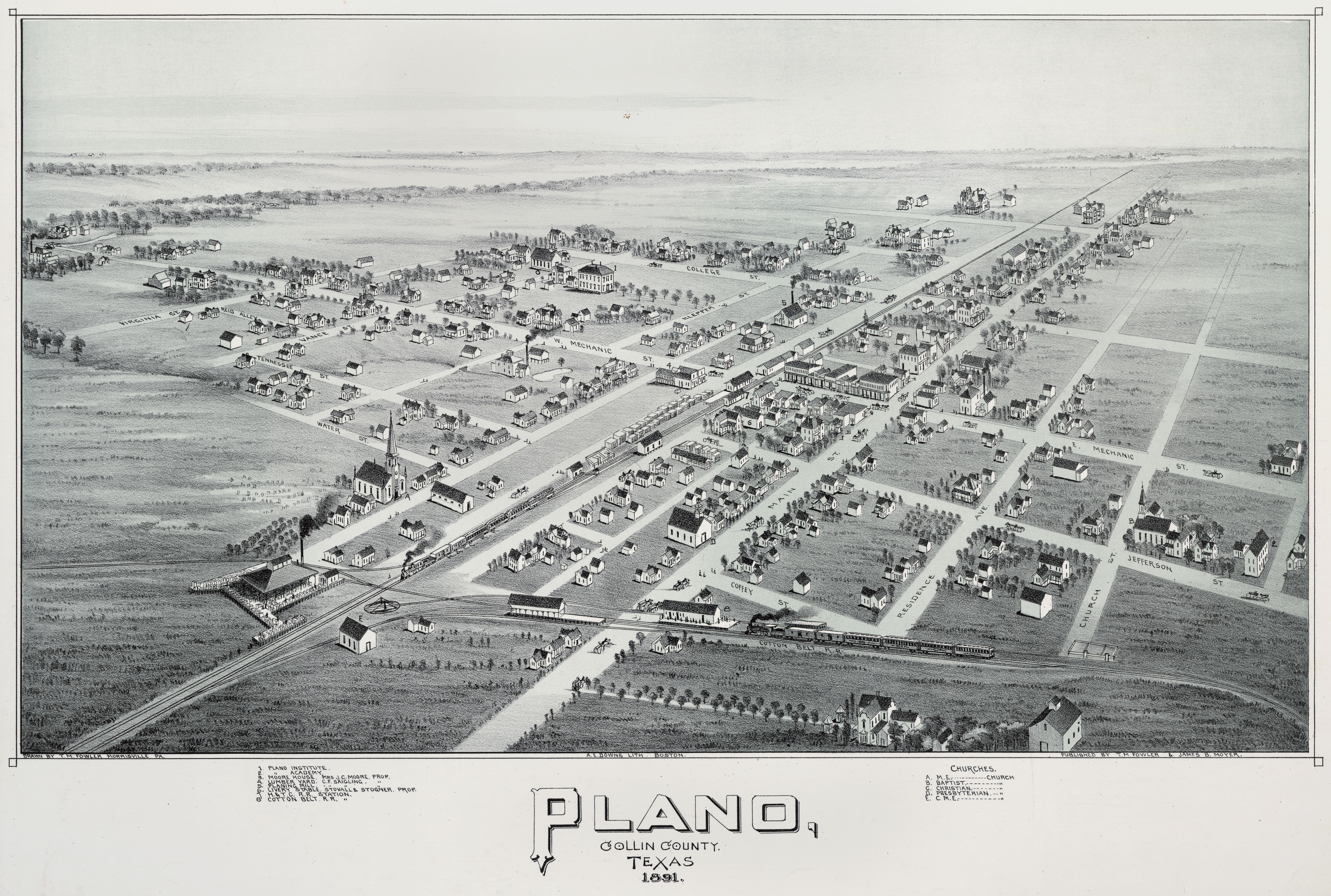
Plano, Texas in 1891. Toned lithograph by A.E. Downs, Boston. Published by T. M. Fowler & James B. Moyer. Amon Carter Museum, Fort Worth, Texas

Several Native American tribes have passed through what is now Plano, including the Comanche, Caddo, and Wichita. Settlers came to the area near present-day Plano in the early 1840s. Facilities such as a sawmill, a gristmill, and a store soon brought more people to the area. A mail service was established, and after rejecting several names for the nascent town (including naming it in honor of then-President Millard Fillmore), residents suggested the name Plano (from the Spanish word for "flat") in reference to the local terrain. The post office accepted the name.

In 1872, the completion of the Houston and Central Texas Railway helped Plano grow, and it was incorporated in 1873. By 1874, the population was over 500. In 1881, a fire raged through the business district, destroying most of the buildings. Plano was rebuilt and business again flourished through the 1880s. Also in 1881, the city assumed responsibility for what would eventually become Plano Independent School District (PISD), ending the days of it being served only by private schools.

At first, Plano's population grew slowly, reaching 1,304 in 1900 and 3,695 in 1960. By 1970, Plano began to feel some of the boom its neighbors had experienced after World War II. A series of public works projects and a change in taxes that removed the farming community from the town helped increase the population. In 1970, the population reached 17,872, and by 1980, it had exploded to 72,000. Sewers, schools, and street development kept pace with this massive increase, largely because of Plano's flat topography, grid layout, and planning initiatives.

During the 1980s, many large corporations, including J. C. Penney and Frito-Lay, moved their headquarters to Plano, spurring further growth. By 1990, the population reached 128,713, dwarfing the county seat, McKinney. In 1994, Plano was recognized as an All-America City. By 2000, the population grew to 222,030, making it one of Dallas's largest suburbs. Plano is surrounded by other municipalities and so cannot expand in area, and there is little undeveloped land within the city limits. But as of July 2012, one large tract of land was being developed: Turnpike Commons at the intersection of Renner Road and the George Bush Turnpike (also bordered by Shiloh Road to the east). The development is expected to feature apartments, medical facilities, restaurants, a Race Trac gas station, and a hotel.

On June 15, 2015, after five years of disuse, a 178-foot (54 m) water tower built in 1985 was demolished to make room for Legacy West.

== Geography ==
According to the United States Census Bureau, Plano has an area of 71.6 square miles (185.5 km^{2}). Plano is about 17 miles (27 km) from Downtown Dallas.

Plano is in the humid subtropical climate zone. The highest recorded temperature was 118 °F (48 °C) in 1936. On average, the coolest month is January and the warmest is July. The lowest recorded temperature was –7 °F (–22 °C) in 1930. The maximum average precipitation occurs in May.

== Demographics ==
Historical population
Census	Pop.	Note	%±
1870	155		—
1880	556		258.7%
1890	842		51.4%
1900	1,304		54.9%
1910	1,258		−3.5%
1920	1,715		36.3%
1930	1,554		−9.4%
1940	1,582		1.8%
1950	2,126		34.4%
1960	3,695		73.8%
1970	17,872		383.7%
1980	72,331		304.7%
1990	128,713		77.9%
2000	222,030		72.5%
2010	259,841		17.0%
2020	285,494		9.9%
2025 (est.)	293,028	▲	2.6%
U.S. Decennial Census

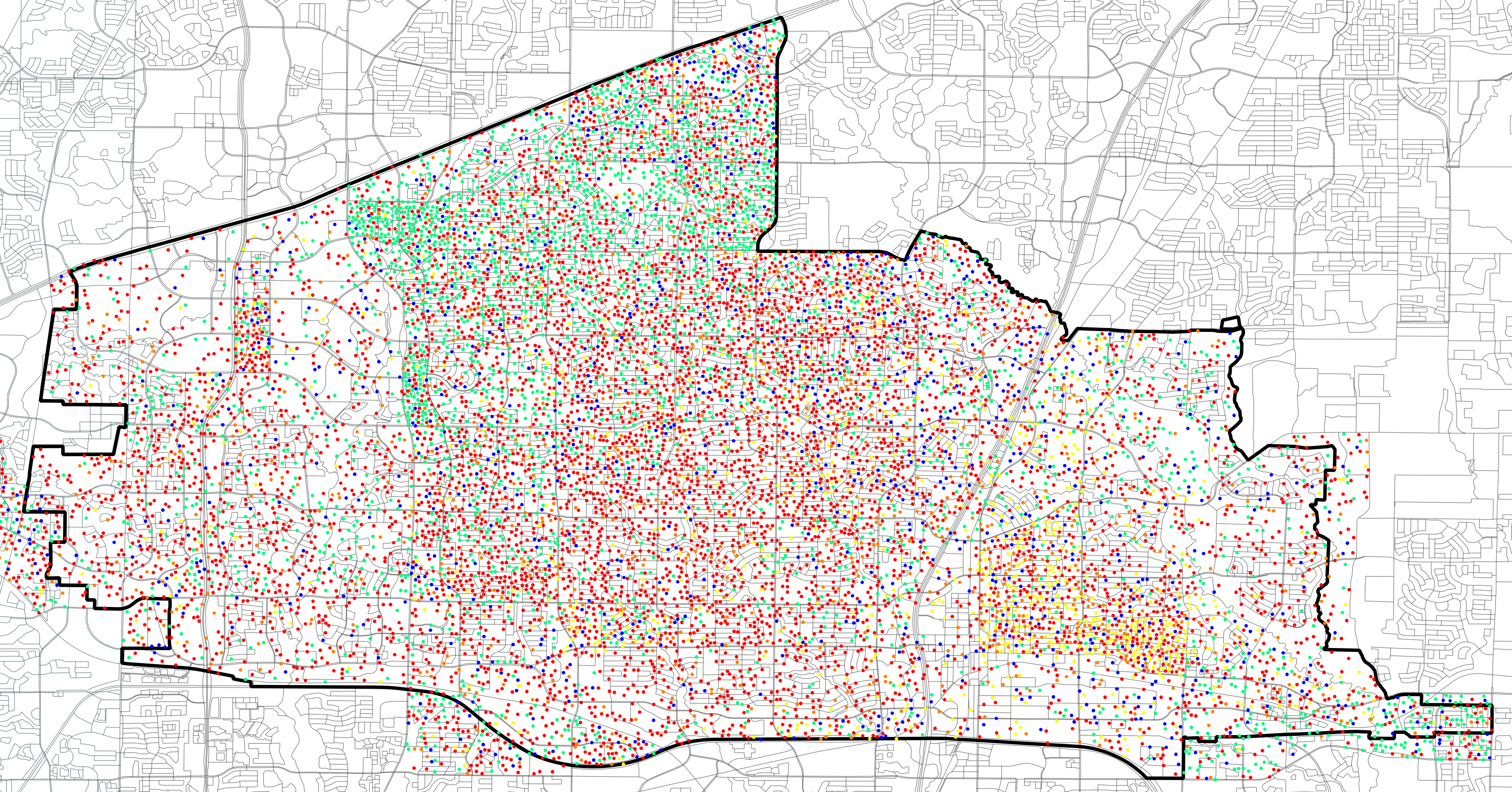
Map of racial distribution in Plano, 2020 U.S. census. Each dot is 25 people: ⬤ White ⬤ Black ⬤ Asian ⬤ Hispanic ⬤ Other

=== Racial and ethnic composition ===
Plano city, Texas – Racial and ethnic composition Note: the US Census treats Hispanic/Latino as an ethnic category. This table excludes Latinos from the racial categories and assigns them to a separate category. Hispanics/Latinos may be of any race.
Race / Ethnicity (NH = Non-Hispanic)	Pop 2000	Pop 2010	Pop 2020	% 2000	% 2010	% 2020
White alone (NH)	161,543	151,629	132,194	72.76%	58.35%	46.30%
Black or African American alone (NH)	10,989	19,199	25,026	4.95%	7.39%	8.77%
Native American or Alaska Native alone (NH)	655	731	845	0.30%	0.32%	0.30%
Asian alone (NH)	22,518	43,659	68,738	10.14%	16.80%	24.08%
Pacific Islander alone (NH)	89	121	133	0.04%	0.05%	0.05%
Some Other Race alone (NH)	317	449	1,330	0.14%	0.17%	0.47%
Mixed race or Multiracial (NH)	3,562	5,779	11,429	1.60%	2.22%	4.00%
Hispanic or Latino (any race)	22,357	38,174	45,799	10.07%	14.69%	16.04%
Total	222,030	259,841	285,494	100.00%	100.00%	100.00%

As of the 2020 United States census, there were 285,494 people, 107,320 households, and 76,211 families residing in the city. As of the census of 2010, Plano had 259,841 people, 99,131 households and 69,464 families, up from 80,875 households and 60,575 families in the 2000 census. The population density was 3,629.1 inhabitants per square mile (1,401.2/km^{2}). There were 103,672 housing units at an average density of 1,448.6 per square mile (559.3/km^{2}).

In 2010, the racial makeup of the city was 67% White (58.4% non-Hispanic white), 7.5% Black, 0.36% Native American, 16.9% Asian (6.5% Asian Indian, 5.2% Chinese, 1.2% Vietnamese, 1.2% Korean, 0.6% Filipino, 0.2% Japanese, 1.9% Other), 0.1% Pacific Islander, 3.86% from other races, and 3.0% from two or more races. Hispanic or Latino made up 14.7% of the population (10.6% Mexican, 0.5% Puerto Rican, 0.2% Cuban, 3.5% Other). By 2020, the racial makeup was 46.3% non-Hispanic white, 8.77% Black or African American, 0.3% Native American, 24.08% Asian, 0.05% Pacific Islander, 0.47% some other race, 4.0% multiracial, and 16.04% Hispanic or Latino of any race, reflecting nationwide trends of greater diversification.

Of the 99,131 households in 2010, 35.8% had children under the age of 18. Married couples accounted for 56.7%; 9.7% had a female householder with no husband present, and 29.9% were non-families. About 24.4% of all households were individuals, and 5.3% had someone living alone who was 65 years of age or older. The average household size was 2.61, and the average family size was 3.15. Data indicates that 28.7% of Plano's population was under the age of 18, 7.0% was 18 to 24, 36.5% was 25 to 44, 22.9% was 45 to 64, and 4.9% was 65 years of age or older. The median age was 34. For every 100 females, there were 99.3 males. For every 100 females age 18 and over, there were 97.2 males.

According to a 2007 estimate, the median income for a household in the city was $84,492, and the median income for a family was $101,616. About 3.0% of families and 4.3% of the population were living below the poverty line, including 4.6% of those under age 18 and 7.8% of those 65 or older. In 2007, Plano had the United States' highest median income among cities with a population exceeding 250,000, at $84,492. According to crime statistics, there were four homicides in Plano in 2006, the lowest rate of all U.S. cities of 250,000 or more people.

Plano also has a substantial Iranian-American community.

=== Foreign-born residents ===
As of the 2000 U.S. census, of the foreign-born residents, 17% were from China, 9% from India, and 4% from Vietnam; a total of 30% of foreign-born residents came from these three countries. That year, 22% of Plano's foreign-born originated in Mexico.

==== Chinese Americans ====
Along with Houston and Sugar Land, Plano has one of Texas's major concentrations of Chinese Americans. According to the 2010 U.S. census, there were 14,500 ethnic Chinese in Plano. Of cities with 250,000 or more residents, Plano has the sixth-largest percentage of ethnic Chinese, making up 5.2% of the city's population. Charlie Yue, the executive vice president of the Association of Chinese Professionals, estimated that about 30,000 Plano residents are Chinese and that many "don't participate in government activities, like the census".

Chinese professionals began to settle Plano by 1991. As of 2011, DFW's Chinese restaurants catering to ethnic Chinese are mainly in Plano and Richardson. Most of the DFW-area Chinese cultural organizations are headquartered in Plano and Richardson. Plano has six Chinese churches and supermarkets, including 99 Ranch Market and zTao Marketplace.

== Economy ==
=== Top employers ===
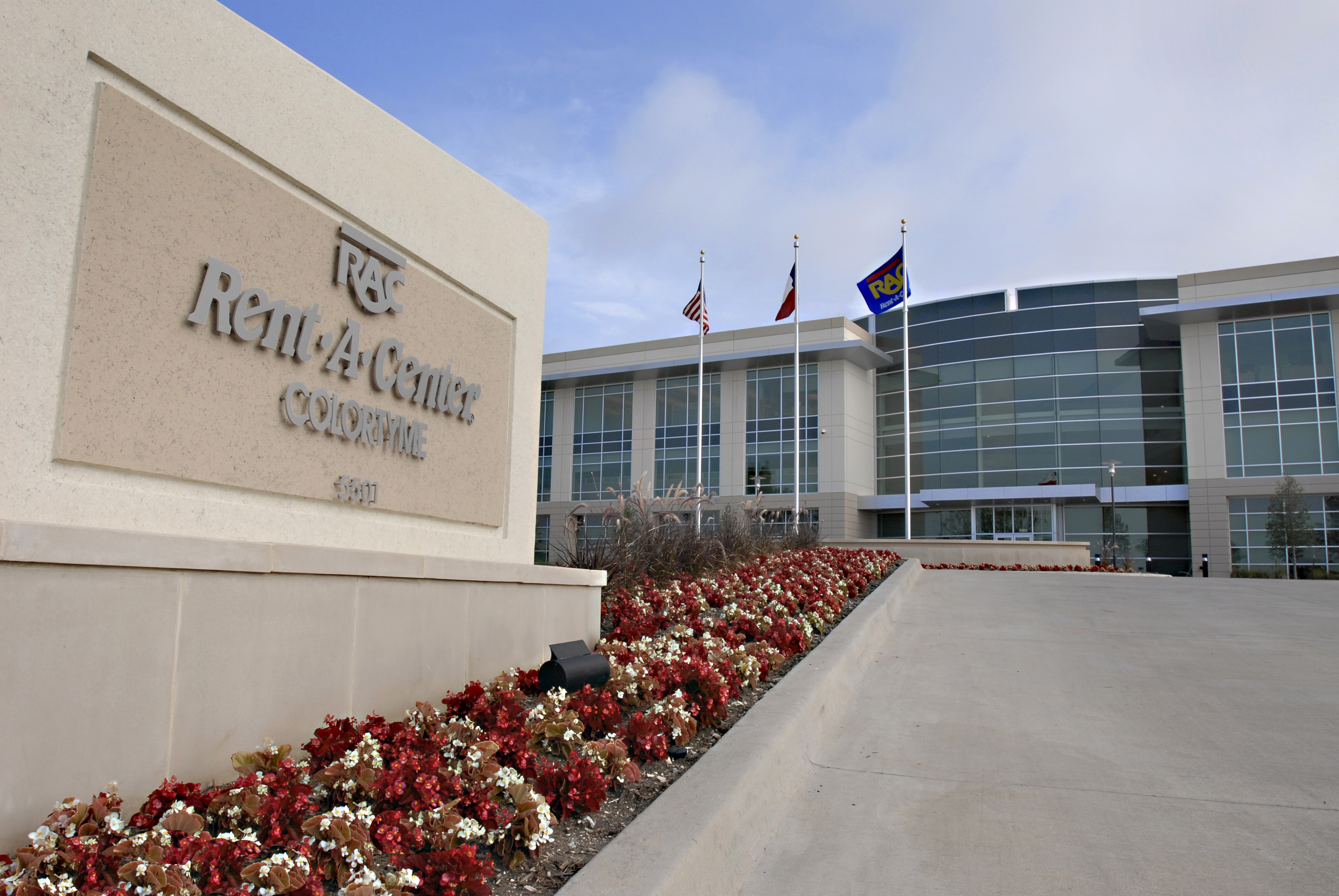
Rent-A-Center headquarters office building in Plano, Texas

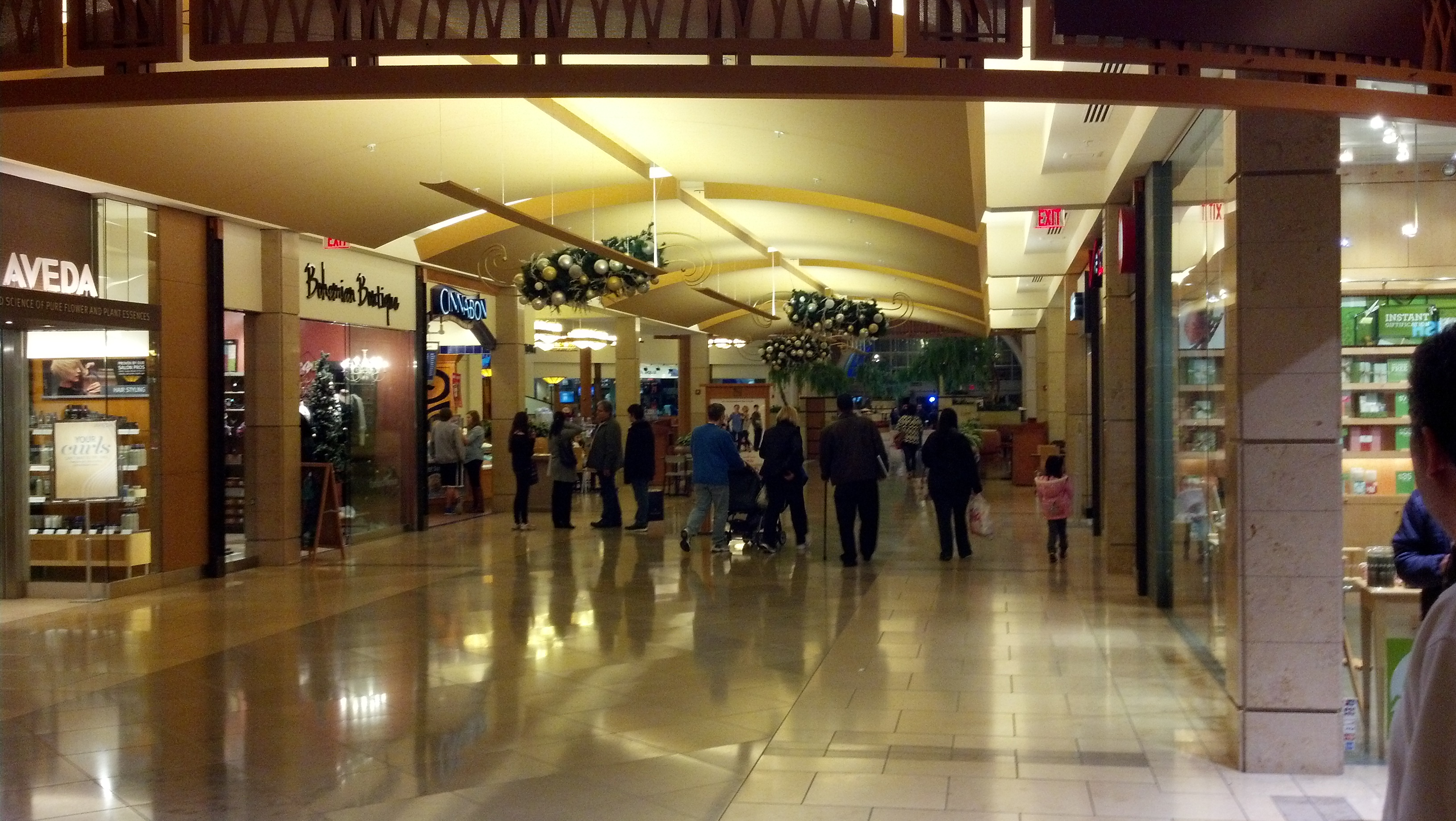
The Shops at Willow Bend, Plano's shopping mall

According to the 2025 Corporate Regional Headquarters Report, Plano's top 10 employers were:

#	Employer	# of Employees
1	JPMorgan Chase	11,261
2	Capital One Finance	5,649
3	Toyota Motor North America, Inc.	4,938
4	PepsiCo	3,759
5	Ericsson	3,346
6	AT&T Foundry and Services	2,500
7	Liberty Mutual Insurance Company	2,100
8	JCPenney Company, Inc.	2,000
9	NTT DATA, Inc.	1,968
10	Samsung Electronics America, Inc. (a subsidiary of Samsung Electronics Co., Ltd.)	1,711

About 80% of Plano's visitors are business travelers, due to its close proximity to Dallas and the many corporations headquartered in Plano. The city also has a convention center owned and operated by the city. Plano has made a concerted effort to draw retail to its downtown area and the Legacy West in an effort to boost sales tax returns. It has two malls, The Shops at Willow Bend and The Shops at Legacy. Collin Creek Mall closed in 2019. There is an area that has apartments, shops, and restaurants constructed with the New Urbanism philosophy. An experimental luxury Walmart Supercenter is at Park Boulevard and the Dallas North Tollway.

=== Headquarters of major corporations ===
Some of the country's largest and most recognized companies are headquartered in Plano. Legacy Drive in ZIP Code 75024, between Preston Road and Dallas North Tollway, has many corporate campuses. The following companies have corporate headquarters (Fortune 1000 headquarters) or major regional offices in Plano:

- Agricen
- At Home
- Beal Bank
- Boeing Global Services
- Cinemark Theatres
- Critical Start
- Diodes Incorporated
- FedEx Office
- Frito-Lay
- Hilti North America
- Huawei Device USA
- JCPenney
- KFC
- Mooyah
- NTT Data Services
- Pizza Hut
- Rent-A-Center
- Ribbon Communications
- Robot Entertainment
- Samsung Electronics
- Siemens Digital Industries Software
- Toyota Motor North America
- Tyler Technologies

In 2014 Toyota Motor North America announced its U.S. headquarters would move from Torrance, California, to Plano. In 2015, Liberty Mutual announced its plans to build a new corporate campus just a few blocks east of Toyota's, bringing an estimated 5,000 jobs to the community. In January 2016, JP Morgan Chase and mortgage giant Fannie Mae announced they would move their regional operations to Plano, bringing a combined 7,000 new jobs to the community.

== Arts and culture ==
The Plano Public Library System (PPLS) consists of the W.O. Haggard Jr. Library, the Maribelle M. Davis Library, the Gladys Harrington Library, the Christopher A. Parr Library, the L.E.R. Schimelpfenig Library, and the Municipal Reference Library. The Haggard Library houses the system's administrative offices.

The Plano Symphony Orchestra is partially funded by the city, performing regularly at St. Andrew United Methodist Church and the Charles W. Eisemann Center for Performing Arts in nearby Richardson.

=== Historic sites ===
- Plano Station, Texas Electric Railway (1908)
- Heritage Farmstead Museum (1891)

=== Sports ===
Plano was considered to be the location of the new arena for the Dallas Stars of the National Hockey League (NHL). This new arena would have been located at the former site of The Shops at Willow Bend mall. Plano voters rejected the proposition to fund the arena on November 3rd 2026. Public opposition continued during a Plano City Council meeting the following week.

== Parks and recreation ==
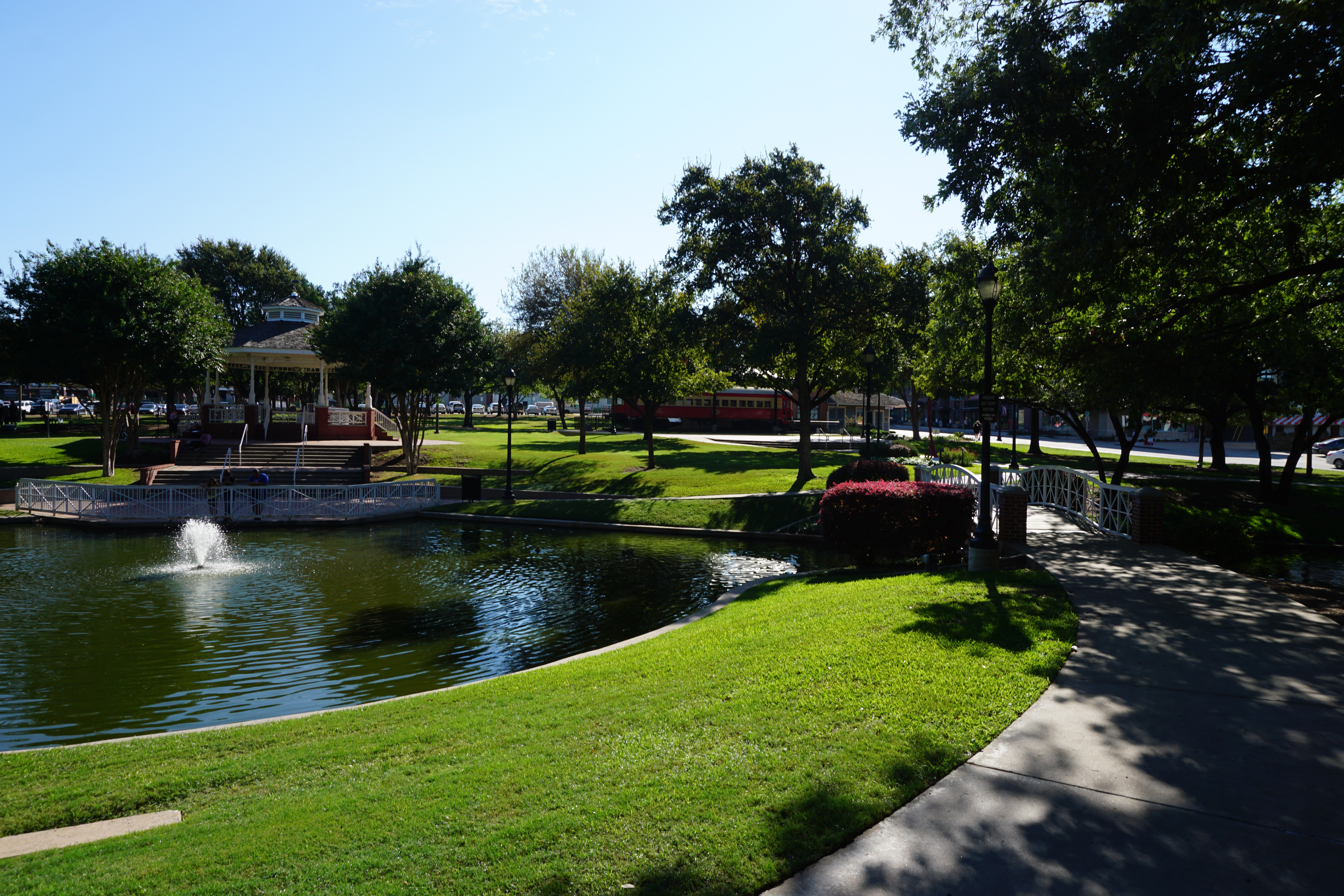
Haggard Park in October 2015

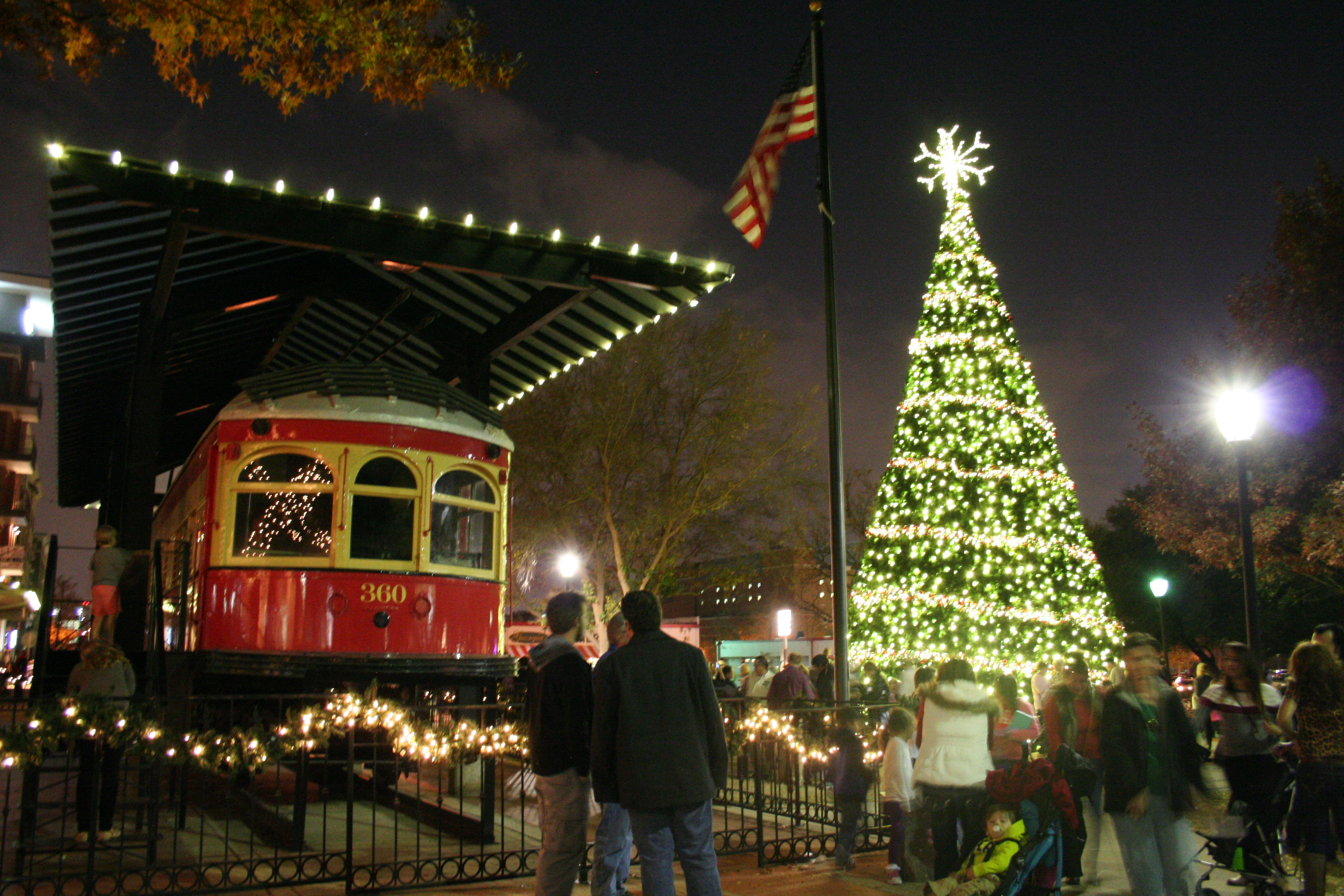
Dickens in Downtown Plano 2014 Lighting of the Tree

Although Plano is named for the flat plains of the area, large trees abound in the city's many parks. One such tree, estimated to be over 200 years old, is in Bob Woodruff Park, near Rowlett Creek on the city's east side.

There are two main open space preserves: Arbor Hills Nature Preserve (200 acres) and Oak Point Park and Nature Preserve (800 acres). Bob Woodruff Park and Oak Point Park and Nature Preserve are connected by biking trails, making the green space one large uninterrupted park space larger than New York City's Central Park (840 acres). Go Ape, a family-friendly place with outdoor activities like ziplining and Tarzan swings, is at Oak Point Park and Preserve. The Plano Balloon Festival, which happens every September, also takes place at Oak Point Park and Preserve. Another open space is Haggard Park, which hosts the annual Plano AsiaFest in May. Acreage of all spaces the Parks Department manages totals 3,830.81. The Plano Master Plan has the acreage growing to 4,092.63 when complete.

There are five recreation centers: Tom Muehlenbeck Recreation Center, Carpenter Park Recreation Center, Oak Point Recreation Center, Liberty Recreation Center, and Douglass Community Center. While Oak Point Recreation Center and Tom Muehlenbeck Recreation Center have both indoor and outdoor pools, Carpenter Park Recreation Center and Liberty Recreation Center has only an indoor and outdoor pool, respectively. Plano Senior Recreation Center is a recreation center dedicated to seniors. There are three swimming pools owned by Plano Parks & Recreation: Harry Rowlinson Community Natatorium, Jack Carter Pool, and Plano Aquatic Center. All the pools are indoor except Jack Carter Pool. Douglass Community Center houses the Boys & Girls Club of Collin County. For pet owners, there are The Dog Park at Jack Carter Park, The Dog Park at Bob Woodruff, and Dog Park at Windhaven Meadows Park.

The City of Plano also owns and operates four performing arts venues and a conference center under the auspices of the Parks and Recreation Department: the Courtyard Theater, the Cox Playhouse, McCall Plaza, The Nature & Retreat Center and the Red Tail Pavilion.

== Government ==
=== Local government ===
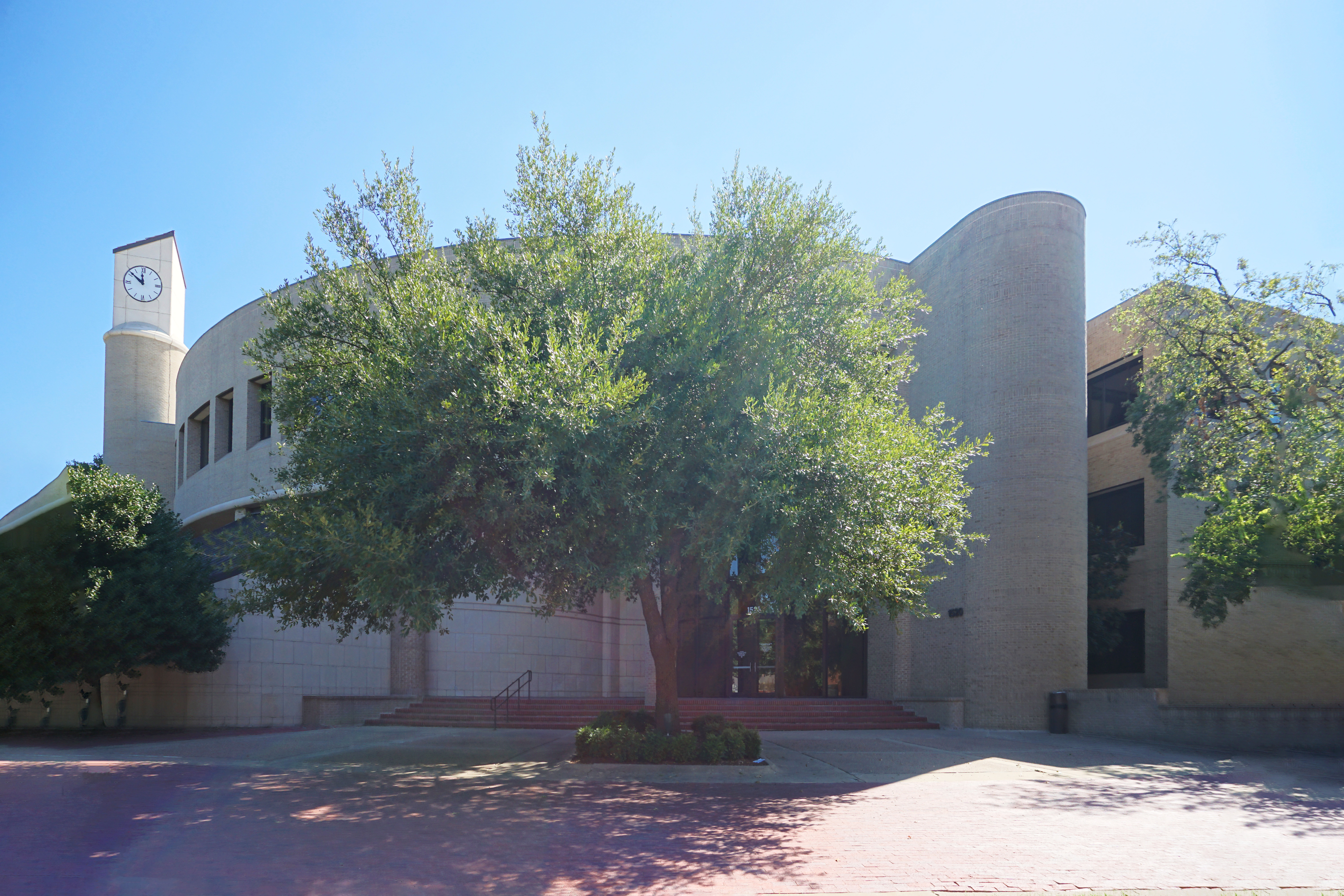
The Municipal Center in October 2015

Plano has a council-manager form of government, with a part-time city council that sets city policy and a city manager responsible for city operations. The Plano City Council has eight members elected on a nonpartisan basis in staggered odd-year elections every other May. Council members and the mayor are elected by and serve the city at large. Council members serving in places one, two, three, and four must reside in that district, and the mayor always serves in place six. The mayor receives a yearly stipend of $8,400, and each council member receives $6,000.

All council members, including the mayor, serve a maximum of two consecutive four-year terms. The mayor and city council members could serve for a maximum of three consecutive three-year terms until voters approved changes to the city charter in 2011.

Mark Israelson has served as city manager of the city of Plano since May 2019.

The 38th mayor of Plano was businessman Harry LaRosiliere, who was elected the first African-American mayor of Plano in 2013. Plano elected its first African-American city council member, David Perry, in 1990.

On December 8, 2014, the city council passed an amendment to its civil rights act to include sexual orientation and gender identity as protected. The ordinance drew the ire of conservative groups such as the Liberty Institute, which argued that it infringed on business owners' religious rights. Many civil rights organizations were not supportive either, such as the Human Rights Campaign, which argued that the policy's exclusion of transgender individuals from being able to use bathrooms and locker rooms that align with their gender identity rendered the ordinance not worth defending.

In the 2008 fiscal year Comprehensive Annual Financial Report, Plano reported $194 million in revenue, $212 million in expenditures, $278 million in total assets, $31.4 million in total liabilities, and $337 million in cash and investments.

Plano is a voluntary member of the North Central Texas Council of Governments association, the purpose of which is to coordinate individual and collective local governments and facilitate regional solutions, eliminate unnecessary duplication, and enable joint decisions.

In 2020, Police Chief Ed Drain announced the Plano Police Department would no longer make arrests for possession of small amounts of marijuana.

=== Politics ===
Dallas's wealthy northern suburbs were solidly Republican, and in 2005, the Bay Area Center for Voting Research ranked Plano, the largest of them, the United States' fifth-most conservative city. It has recently become more competitive in national elections as its population has diversified, shifting toward the Democratic Party since 2016, when Donald Trump won the city by a narrow margin. In 2018, Beto O'Rourke became the first Democrat to win the city in a statewide election in the 21st century, and in 2020, Joe Biden won the city by an even larger margin. But in local and state elections, Plano still leans Republican, voting to reelect Governor Greg Abbott in 2018 and narrowly reelecting Republicans to the Texas House of Representatives and Texas Senate in 2018 and 2020.

2020 US Presidential Election precinct results: Biden 40–50% 50–60% 60–70% 70–80% / Trump 40–50% 50–60%

Plano city vote by party in presidential elections
Year	Democratic	Republican	Third Parties
2020	53.50% 72,736	44.75% 60,840	1.76% 2,389
2016	45.31% 49,522	50.12% 54,784	4.56% 4,988
2012	37.44% 37,435	60.74% 60,733	1.82% 1,817
2008	39.70% 42,441	59.11% 63,193	1.19% 1,280
2004	31.07% 30,387	68.06% 66,562	0.87% 852
2000	25.65% 20,888	71.78% 58,447	2.57% 2,093

Plano city vote by party in Class I Senate elections
Year	Democratic	Republican	Third Parties
2018	52.35% 55,804	46.85% 49,941	0.81% 859
2012	36.94% 35,813	60.01% 58,183	3.06% 2,963
2006	28.75% 15,040	68.91% 36,047	2.34% 1,225
2000	18.22% 14,634	79.29% 63,674	2.49% 1,999

Plano city vote by party in Class II Senate elections
Year	Democratic	Republican	Third Parties
2020	48.86% 65,024	48.87% 65,039	2.26% 3,013
2014	31.65% 18,134	64.63% 37,028	3.72% 2,131
2008	35.79% 36,916	61.81% 63,753	2.40% 2,480
2002	30.55% 17,156	68.45% 38,441	1.01% 566

Plano city vote by party in gubernatorial elections
Year	Democratic	Republican	Third Parties
2022	50.92% 48,773	47.66% 45,617	1.42% 1,360
2018	44.43% 46,993	53.67% 56,757	1.90% 2,008
2014	37.03% 21,331	61.57% 35,461	1.72% 991
2010	35.62% 18,992	61.71% 32,904	2.67% 1,427
2006	26.11% 13,828	47.15% 24,970	26.74% 14,164
2002	25.07% 14,294	73.52% 41,910	1.93% 1,102

=== State representation ===
Plano is split between the 33rd, 65th, 66th, 67th, 70th, and 89th Districts in the Texas House of Representatives. The part of Plano in Collin County is wholly contained in Texas Senate, District 8, while the Denton County portion is in Texas Senate, District 30.

Republican Justin Holland represents Texas House District 33, Republican Kronda Thimesch represents Texas House District 65, Republican Matt Shaheen represents Texas House District 66, Republican Jeff Leach has represented Texas House District 67 since 2013, Democrat Mihaela Plesa represents Texas House District 70, and Republican Candy Noble represents Texas House District 89. Republican Angela Paxton represents Texas Senate District 8 and Republican Brent Hagenbuch represents Texas Senate District 30.

=== Federal representation ===
Plano is split between Texas's 3rd, 4th, 26th, and 32nd congressional districts, represented by Republicans Keith Self, Pat Fallon, and Brandon Gill, and Democrat Julie Johnson respectively. Plano is represented in the United States Senate by Republicans Ted Cruz and John Cornyn.

== Education ==
Plano has 70 public schools, 16 private schools, and two campuses of Collin College.

=== Primary and secondary schools ===
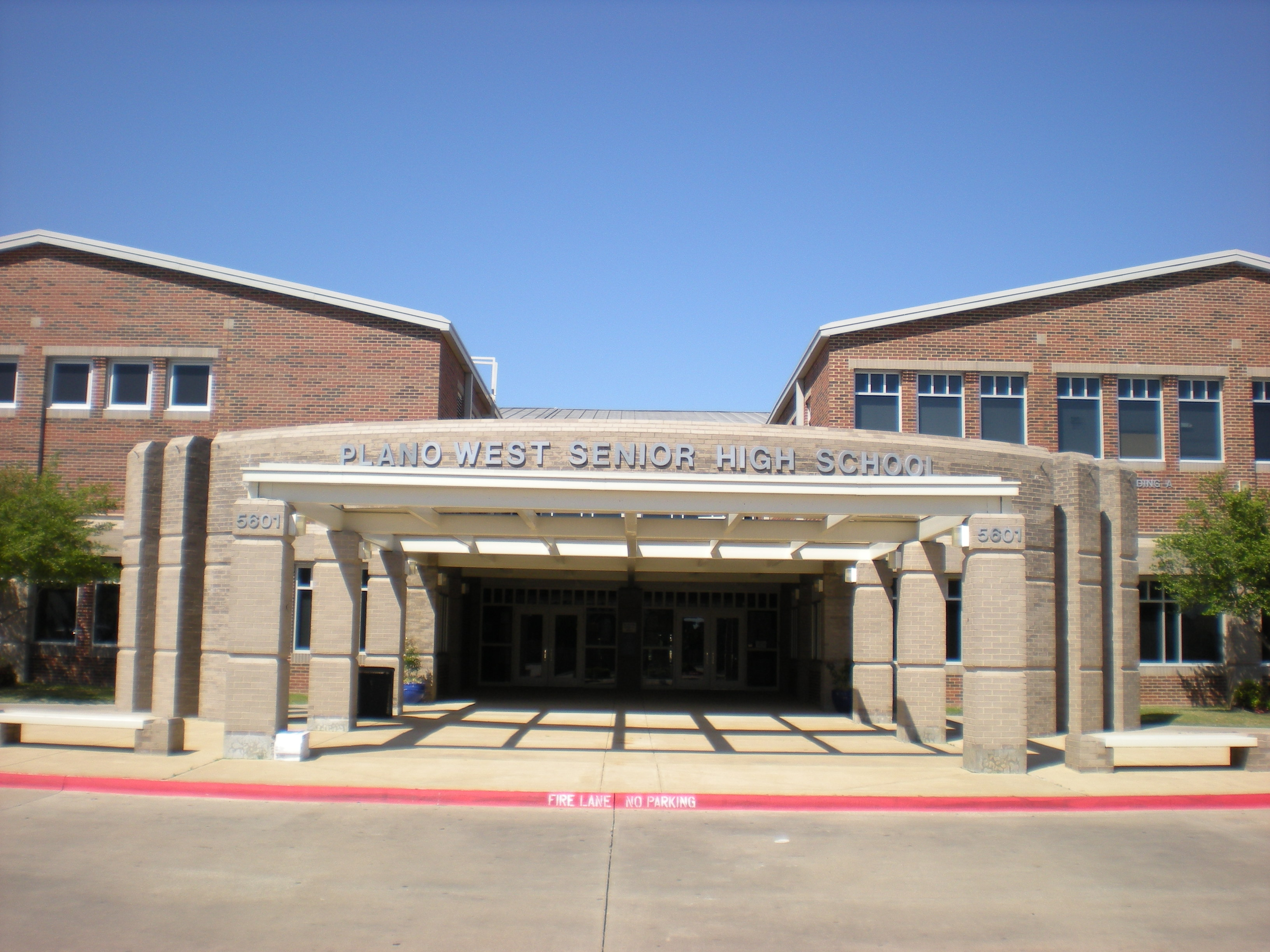
Plano West Senior High School

The Plano Independent School District serves most of the city. Student enrollment has increased dramatically till 2012. However, the district has seen a decline since then, which resulted in two middle schools and two elementary schools to be closed for the 2025–2026 school year. Plano has a unique high school system, in which grades 9–10 attend a high school and grades 11–12 attend a senior high. There are three senior high schools (grades 11–12) in PISD: Plano East, Plano, and Plano West. Small portions of Plano are served by the Lewisville Independent School District, Frisco Independent School District, and Allen Independent School District.

Plano schools graduate more of their students than comparable districts. In 2010, 93% of Plano Independent School District students graduated from high school, 18 percentage points higher than Dallas ISD's rate. In 2012, Plano Independent School District announced that 128 seniors were selected as National Merit Semifinalists.

Plano has given $1.2 billion in property tax revenue to other school districts through Texas's "Robin Hood" law, which requires school districts designated as affluent to give a percentage of their property tax revenue to other districts outside the county. In 2008, PISD gave $86 million. Controversy erupted when the salaries of teachers in less affluent districts—such as Garland ISD—exceeded the salaries of teachers in districts that had to pay into "Robin Hood".

In the 2013–14 school year, Plano ISD opened two four-year high school academies, one focusing on STEAM (STEM education plus Media Arts) called Plano ISD Academy High School, and the other on health science. Additionally, the district modified its International Baccalaureate program to allow freshmen and sophomores in the program to be housed at Plano East Senior High School.

In addition to Catholic primary and middle schools, the Roman Catholic Diocese of Dallas operates John Paul II High School in Plano. Non-Catholic private schools in Plano include Great Lakes Academy, Spring Creek Academy, Yorktown Education, and Prestonwood Christian Academy. In addition, the Collin County campus of Coram Deo Academy is in the One Church (previously Four Corners Church) facility in Plano.

=== Colleges and universities ===
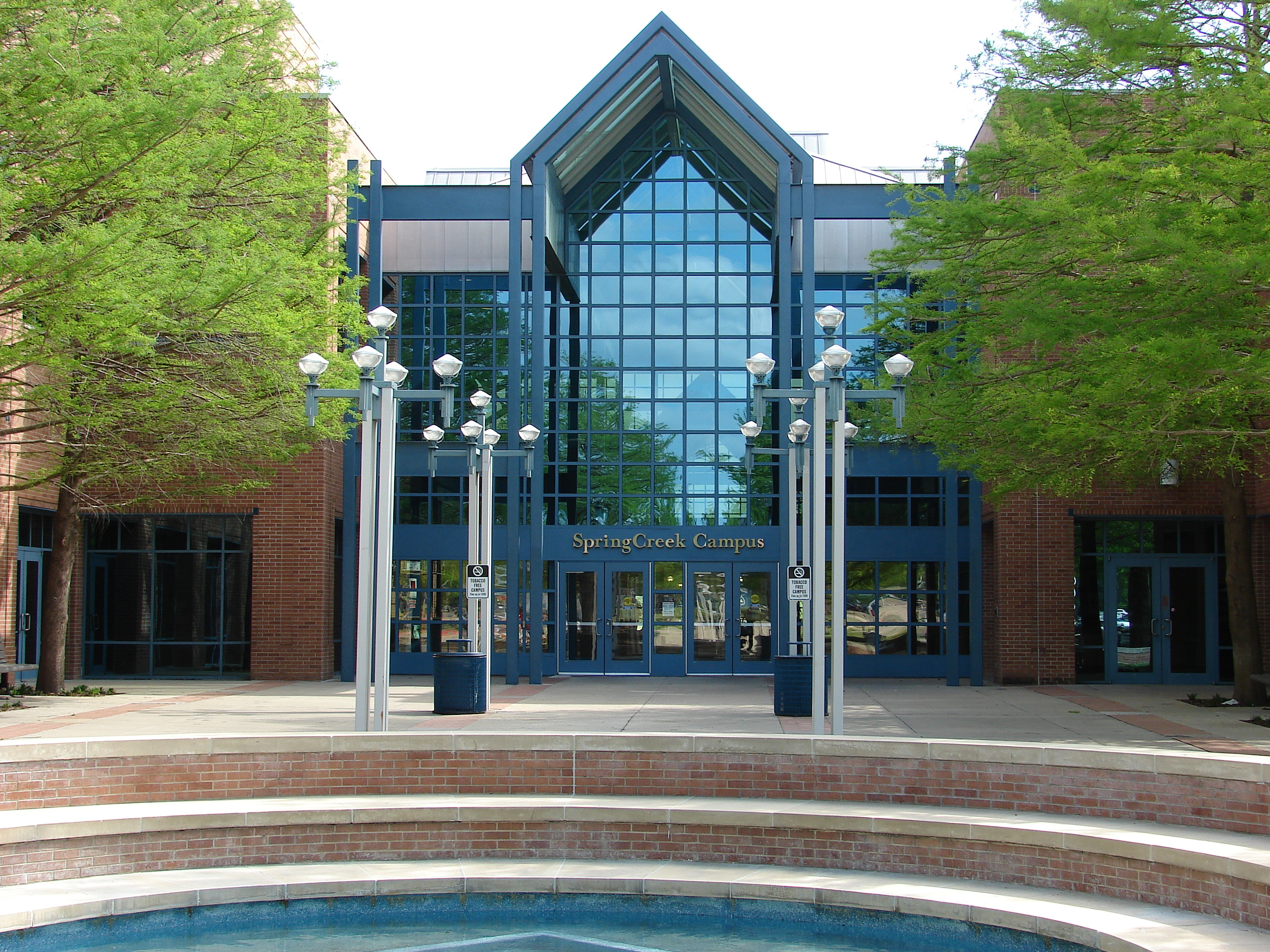
Entrance to the Spring Creek campus of Collin College in Plano, Texas

Plano is the home to two campuses of Collin College, one at the Courtyard Center on Preston Park Boulevard and the larger Spring Creek Campus on Spring Creek Parkway at Jupiter. DBU North, a satellite campus of Dallas Baptist University, is in west Plano, and offers undergraduate and graduate courses and houses the admissions and academic counseling offices.

As defined by the Texas Legislature, all of Collin County is in the Collin College district. The portion of Plano within Denton County is zoned to North Central Texas College.

== Infrastructure ==
=== Transportation ===
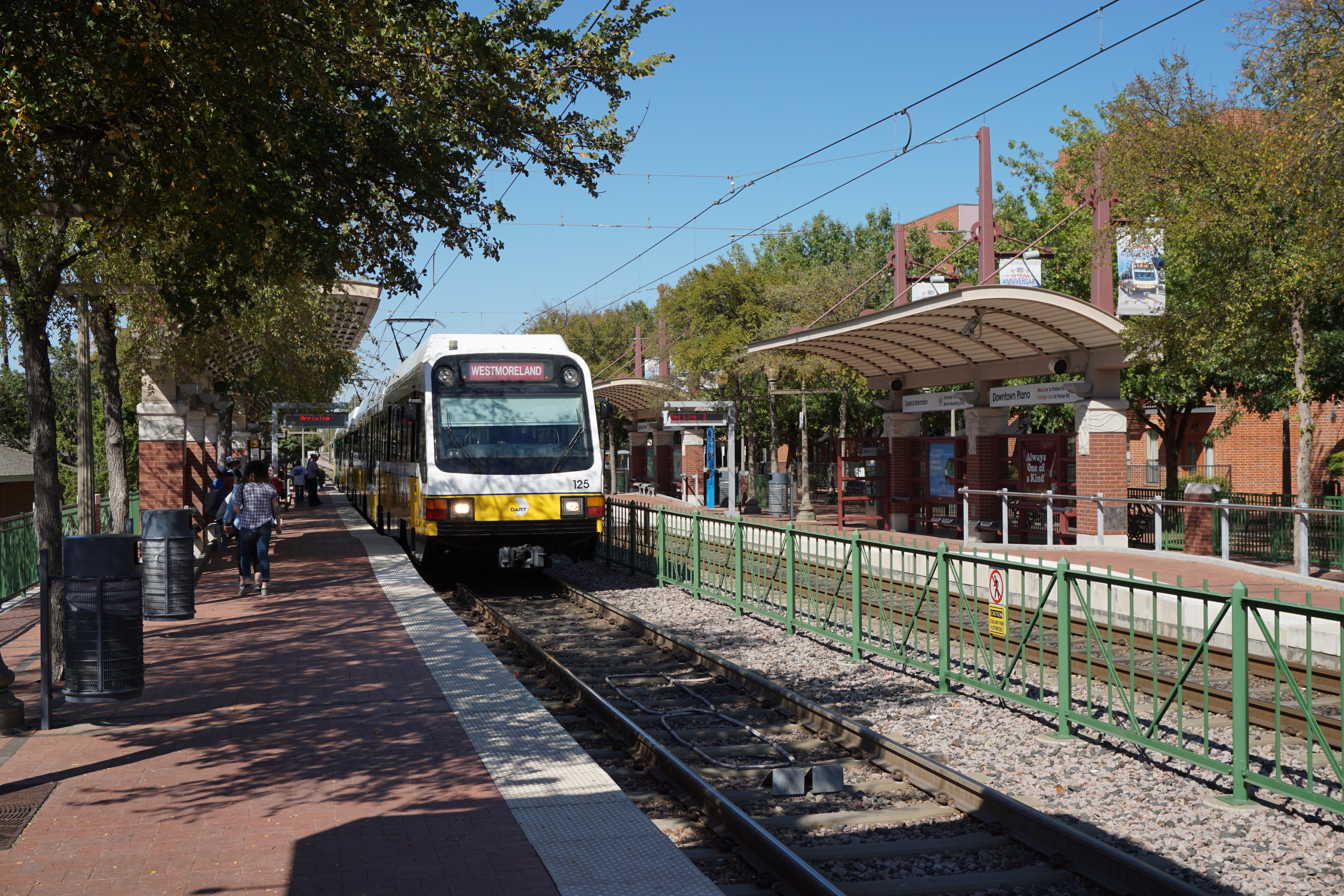
A DART Red Line train at the Downtown Plano station

Plano is one of 12 suburbs of Dallas that opt into the Dallas Area Rapid Transit (DART) public transportation system. During its early membership in DART, Plano was lightly served by bus lines, but in 2002, the Red Line of the DART rail project opened stations in Downtown Plano and at Parker Road, which provide access to commuters traveling to work elsewhere in the Dallas area. The Orange Line traverses the same route for selected weekday/peak hour trips. Bus routes serve areas of downtown, south central, and west Plano, but no bus routes serve the far north, north central, and far east areas. Instead, DART's GoLink on-demand service serves these areas. The Silver Line operates in Southern Plano and has two stops: Shiloh Road Station and 12th Street Station. Approximately 1% of the city's population uses DART. The Parker Road station charged for parking for non-member city residents from April 2, 2012, to April 3, 2014, as a part of the Fair Share Parking initiative. Two DART park-and-ride bus facilities, separate from the rail lines, are in Plano: Jack Hatchell Transit Center and Northwest Plano Park & Ride.

Plano was the first city in Collin County to adopt a master plan for its road system. The use of multi-lane, divided highways for all major roads allows for higher speed limits, generally 40 mph (64 km/h), but sometimes up to 55 mph (89 km/h) on the northern section of Preston Road. Plano is served directly by several major roadways and freeways. Central Plano is bordered to the east by U.S. Highway 75, the west by Dallas North Tollway, the south by President George Bush Turnpike (Texas State Highway 190 (east of Coit Road)), and the north by Sam Rayburn Tollway (Texas State Highway 121). Preston Road (Texas State Highway 289) is a major thoroughfare that runs through the city. Plano is Texas's largest city without an interstate highway.

Plano opened a new interchange at Parker Rd. and U.S. 75 in December 2010. The single-point interchange is the first of its kind in Texas. The design is intended to reduce severe congestion at this interchange. According to reports, traffic congestion has been reduced by 50-75%.

Plano is roughly 30 miles northeast of Dallas/Fort Worth International Airport, the primary airport serving Plano residents and visitors. Dallas Love Field Airport is also in the region and is a national airport serving domestic flights.

=== Fire department ===
Plano Fire-Rescue has 386 full-time firefighters who operate out of 13 stations. The department is responsible for a population of 271,000 residents spread across 72 square miles (190 km^{2}). It is also the 10th-largest department (by number of firefighters) in the state of Texas.

=== Police ===
The Plano Police Department is an accredited agency and Plano's principal law enforcement agency. The department is led by Chief Ed Drain. The department has authorized staff of 414 sworn officers, 178 full-time civilian employees, and 79 civilian part-time employees. It is a member of the North Texas Crime Commission and uses the Crime Stoppers program.

=== Water ===
Plano is part of the North Texas Municipal Water District, headquartered in Wylie, Texas. Lake Lavon is the district's principal source of raw water. Plano's water distribution system includes:

- 10 elevated towers
- 12 ground storage tanks
- 54.5 million-gallon water storage capacity
- 5 pump stations
- 225 million-gallon daily pumping capacity
- 1,080 miles of water mains
- 65,965 metered service connections

== Notable people ==
- Kellyn Acosta, soccer player
- Kristin Adams, actress and American Idol contestant
- Jeran Akers, politician
- Anousheh Ansari, engineer and co-founder and chairwoman of Prodea Systems
- Bryn Apprill, voice actress affiliated with Funimation
- Lance Armstrong, former professional cyclist
- Jake Arrieta, Cy Young Award-winning baseball pitcher, Plano East alumnus
- Aaron Aryanpur, stand-up comedian
- Alyssa Baumann, gymnast
- Andrew Beal, founder and chairman of Beal Bank
- Justin Blalock, NFL player
- Spencer Boldman, actor
- Corben Bone, soccer player
- Lauri Bonacorsi, ice dancer
- Kyle Bosworth, NFL player
- Edward Boyden, neuroscientist
- Christopher "Big Black" Boykin, TV host
- Charlie Bradshaw, NFL player
- Jake Brendel, NFL player
- Rebecca Bross, gymnast
- Bob Bruce, former professional baseball pitcher
- Snyder Brunell, soccer player
- Kingsley Bryce, soccer player
- James Buescher, former professional stock car racing driver
- Rex Burkhead, NFL player
- Carl Bussey, soccer player
- Marion Campbell, NFL player and head coach
- Danny Cater, former professional baseball player
- Caesar Cervin, soccer forward and coach
- Eve Chalom, a former competitive ice dancer who trained in Plano in the 1990s
- Andrew Chandler, actor
- Karen Chau, artist, showrunner, and Disney executive
- Jay Chern, director
- Arden Cho, actress
- Alan Chikin Chow, digital creator and actor
- T. J. Cline, American-Israeli basketball player
- Blake Coleman, NHL player
- Michael Collodi, soccer player
- Comer Cottrell, founder, Pro-Line Corp.
- Fred Couples, professional golfer, formerly lived in Plano
- Chace Crawford, actor
- Tyler Davis, basketball player
- Christopher Dean, retired ice dancer who coached in Plano in the 1990s
- Chad Deering, former soccer player
- Rob Dickerman, spinal surgeon
- Robert Dodd, former professional baseball pitcher
- Kenton Duty, actor
- Phil Dyer, politician
- Chuck Easttom, Scientist
- Arlo Eisenberg, street skating pioneer
- Pat Evans, politician
- Tyler Ewing, composer
- Connor Fields, professional BMX racer
- Keith Flowers, football player
- Karith Foster, comedian
- Alyson Fox, illustrator
- Ben Fricke, NFL player
- Anson Funderburgh, blues guitarplayer and bandleader of Anson Funderburgh and the Rockets
- Nick Garcia, soccer player
- Gayle, singer
- Mathew Gates, ice dancer who trained in Plano in the 1990s
- John Georgelas, jihadist
- Gene Gibson, basketball coach
- Mónica González, soccer player
- Amber Glenn, figure skater
- Jack Graham, pastor of Prestonwood Baptist Church
- C. H. Greenblatt, TV writer
- Bob Guccione, publisher of Penthouse
- Kerri Hanks, soccer forward
- Cody Hanson, musician and songwriter
- Dick Haugland, biomedical researcher
- Brad Hawkins, actor, country singer and martial artist
- Sara Payne Hayden, female test pilot
- Fred E. Haynes Jr., Marine Corps general
- Marques Haynes, former professional basketball player
- Mark "Haz" Hazinski, professional table tennis athlete
- Lorraine Heath, author
- George H. Heilmeier, inventor of liquid crystal displays
- John Herrington, retired astronaut
- John Benjamin Hickey, actor
- Sam Honaker, NFL player and consul general to Turkey
- Elise Hu, broadcast journalist who hosts the TED Talks Daily podcast
- Rashad Hussain, associate White House Counsel and diplomat
- Michael Irvin, NFL player
- Casey James, singer and American Idol contestant
- Stephen H. Jecko, Episcopal bishop
- Sam Johnson, former U.S. representative and P.O.W. cellmate of John McCain
- Tania Joya, former jihadist
- Hunter Jumper, soccer player
- Stephen Katz, TV screenwriter
- Marklen Kennedy, actor
- Gerald Ketchum, Antarctic explorer
- Jimmy King, NBA player and former Michigan Fab Five member
- Madison Kocian, gymnast
- Harry LaRosiliere, politician
- Muhammed Lawal, MMA fighter, professional wrestler, NCAA wrestler and coach
- Jeff Leach, politician
- John Leake, NFL player
- Brad Leland, actor
- Ruifeng Li, chess grandmaster
- Will Licon, American Record-holder in the 200-yard breaststroke
- Per Lindstrand, aeronautical engineer, pilot, adventurer and entrepreneur who set a new world altitude record for hot-air balloons on June 6, 1988, ascending from Plano
- Nastia Liukin, gymnast
- Valeri Liukin, gymnastics coach
- John S. Loisel, World War II fighter ace
- Bronko Lubich, wrestler
- Katie Lund, professional soccer player
- D'Anton Lynn, former American football cornerback
- Merlyn Mantle, author and widow of Mickey Mantle
- Yevgeny Marchenko, gymnastics coach
- Warren Maxwell, ice dancer who coached in Plano in the 1990s
- Harold Mayo, former football coach
- Kevin McCarthy, radio broadcaster
- Molly McClure, actress
- Glenn McCuen, actor and gymnast
- Kenny McEntyre, football player
- Kevin McHale, actor and singer
- Billy McKinney, Major League Baseball outfielder
- Scott Mechlowicz, actor
- Doug Mellard, stand-up comedian
- Adam Miller, professional baseball pitcher
- Robert J. Morris, founder of the now-defunct University of Plano
- Asif Mujtaba, cricketer and founder of the Dallas Youth Cricket League
- Kevin Murphy, football player
- William Murrah, professional football player
- Takudzwa Ngwenya, rugby player
- Cody Nickson, TV personality
- Otho Nitcholas, baseball pitcher and first city chief of police
- Stefan Noesen, NHL player
- Joseph Noteboom, football player
- Katelyn Ohashi, gymnast
- Toben Opurum, football player
- Matt Osborne, professional wrestler
- Hunter Parrish, actor
- Keaton Parks, soccer player
- James Parrish, football player
- Candice Patton, actress
- Drew Pearson, football player
- Charlie Peprah, NFL player
- Ross Perot, founder, Perot Systems
- Christopher Pettiet, actor
- Billy Phillips, former U.S. soccer goalkeeper
- Paige Pierce, professional disc golfer, five-time PDGA World Champion
- Patrice Pike, singer
- Polyphia, progressive rock band
- Dillon Powers, soccer player
- Jordan Pugh, football player
- Penny Ramsey, contestant on Survivor: Thailand
- Julius Randle, NBA player
- John Henry Rasor, pioneer, cotton farmer, and namesake of many Plano locations
- Greg Ray, IndyCar Series driver
- Alex Reid, singer
- Alan Reuber, football player
- Stephen Rippy, composer
- Keenan Robinson, football player
- Devorah Rose, editor-in-chief of Social Life magazine, television personality, and entrepreneur
- Daniel Roseberry, fashion designer and creative director of Schiaparelli.
- Cameron Rupp, professional baseball catcher
- Rusty Russell, football coach
- Chris Sampson, professional baseball pitcher
- Boz Scaggs, musician
- Bill Sefton, pole vaulter
- Meenakshi Seshadri, Bollywood actress
- Matt Shaheen, Republican member of Texas House of Representatives from Plano; former Collin County precinct commissioner
- Howie Shannon, basketball player and coach
- Florence Shapiro, Republican member of Texas Senate, known for sponsoring "Ashley's Laws"
- Charlie Shepard, Canadian football player
- Joseph W. Shepard, pioneer, horse and mule breeder, and namesake of many Plano locations
- Abby Smith, soccer player
- Billy Ray Smith Jr., NFL player
- Brian J. Smith, actor
- Eric M. Smith, 39th Commandant of the Marine Corps
- Lyon Sprague de Camp, fantasy writer
- Barbara Staff, co-chair of Ronald Reagan's 1976 Texas presidential primary campaign
- Russell A. Steindam, Medal of Honor recipient
- Jonathan Stickland, member of Texas House of Representatives from Tarrant County; born in Plano in 1983
- Tyson Sullivan, actor
- Jordan Tata, professional baseball pitcher
- Terry Tausch, football player
- Van Taylor, Republican former state senator from Plano; former state representative; Iraq War officer
- George Teague, football player
- Pat Thomas, football player
- T.J. Thyne, actor
- Austin Bennett Tice, journalist kidnapped while reporting in Syria
- Travis Tope, actor
- Alan Tudyk, actor
- Mark Tuinei, football player
- Michael Urie, actor
- Grant Van De Casteele, soccer player
- Vickiel Vaughn, football player
- Chris Valletta, co-founder of Mission, a consumer products company, and a contestant on The Apprentice
- Michael Viscardi, mathematician
- Terrence Wheatley, football player
- G. Clifton Wisler, historical novelist
- Dudley Wysong, professional golfer
- Jeffery Xiong, chess grandmaster
- Zig Ziglar, motivational speaker, businessman

== Sister cities ==
Plano's sister cities are:

- Hsinchu, Taiwan (2003)
- San Pedro Garza García, Mexico (1995)

Brampton, Canada, was also a sister city to Plano until 2018.

== See also ==
- Frisco, Texas
- Allen, Texas
- McKinney, Texas
- List of companies in the Dallas–Fort Worth metroplex
