= Lake Ray Hubbard =

Reservoir in Texas, United States

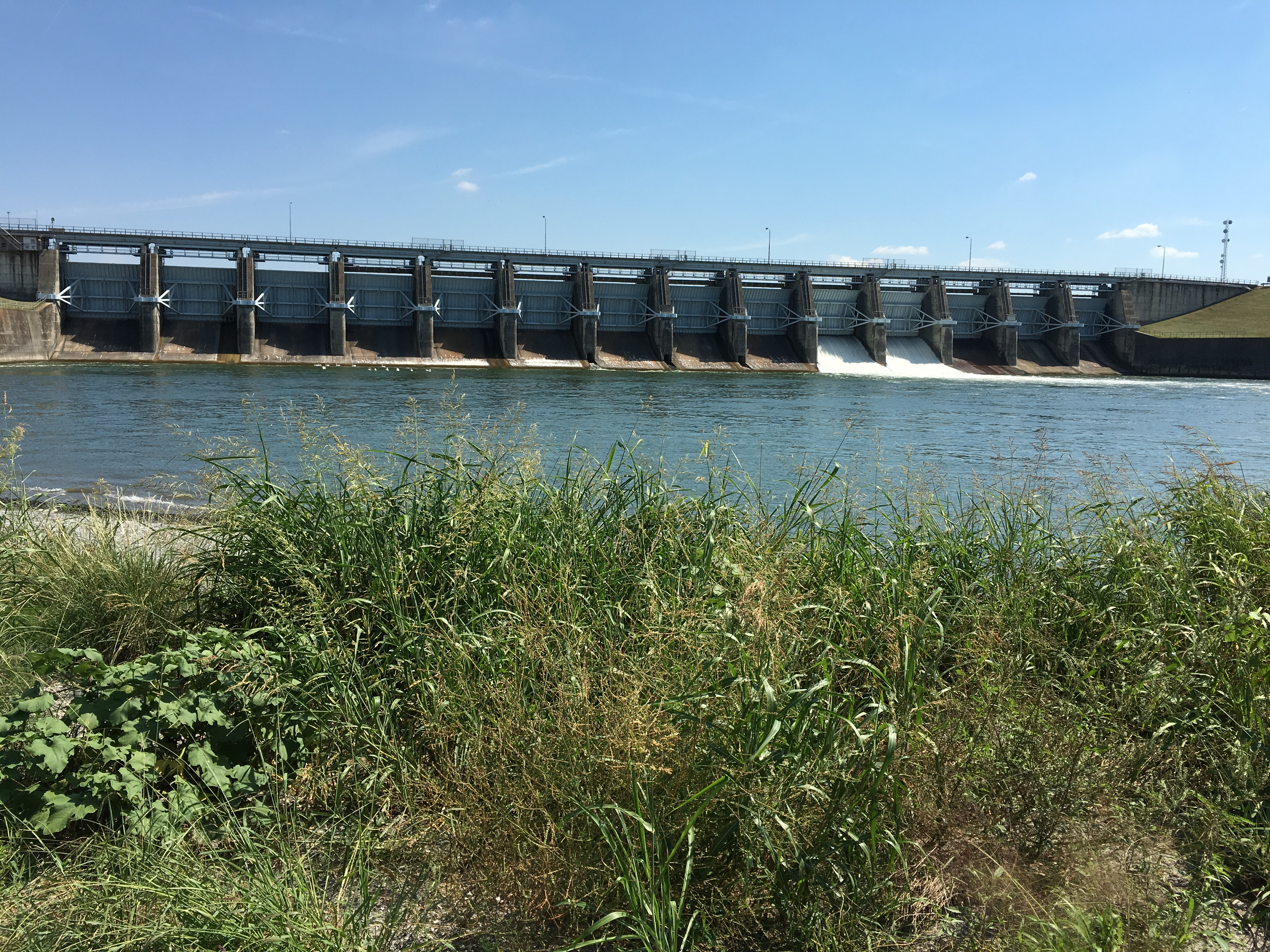
- Dam at Lake Ray Hubbard

- Location within Texas Location within the United States
- Location: Rockwall / Dallas / Collin / Kaufman counties in Texas, United States
- Coordinates: 32°47′58″N 96°29′42″W
- Type: Reservoir
- Basin countries: United States
- Surface area: 22,745 acres (9,205 ha)
- Max. depth: 40 ft (12 m)
- Surface elevation: 435.5 ft (132.7 m)

Lake Ray Hubbard, formerly Eastern Dallas Lake or Forney Lake, is a freshwater impoundment (reservoir) located in Dallas, Texas in the counties of Dallas, Kaufman, Collin, and Rockwall, just north of the City of Forney. It was created by the construction of the Rockwall-Forney Dam, which impounded the East Fork Trinity River.

It measures 22,745 acres (92.05 km^{2}) in size with a storage capacity of 490,000 acre-ft (600 million m^{3}) and a maximum depth of 40 ft (12 m). The dam is currently owned by the City of Dallas. I-30 crosses the lake on the Eastern Dallas Causeway. The lake was originally named Forney Lake for the small city of Forney. After the City of Dallas incorporated the lake, it was renamed after a living person, Ray Hubbard, who presided over the Dallas Parks and Recreation System board from 1943 to 1972. The reservoir is currently managed and owned by Dallas Water Utilities.

== History ==
Originally designed to provide water to the North Texas region, the project was started in 1964 and managed by the S. and A. Construction Company and the Markham, Brown and M. C. Winter Construction Company. The lake was impounded in 1968, and a 2-mile (3.2 km) earthfill dam was completed in 1969. By 1970, the lake reached its maximum design extent.

Due to the territorial expansion and exercise of the extraterritorial jurisdiction of the City of Dallas, the lake and the Interstate 30 (I-30) bridges are now within the jurisdiction of the City of Dallas, rather than the cities surrounding it. A mutual-aid agreement is in place between Dallas and the other cities, but ultimate responsibility lies with Dallas.

Several areas of the lake have been infested with hydrilla.

Because of its location in a densely populated area, the lake is crossed by several bridges and causeways. The most significant is I-30, with six lanes on a 2.9-mile (4.7 km) causeway that bisects the lake, and President George Bush Turnpike, the eastern expansion completed in 2012 with a 0.9-mile (1.4 km) bridge spanning the Rowlett Creek inlet. The 1.8-mile (2.9 km) Texas State Highway 66 bridge was constructed in the 1970s and twinned in the early 2000s, joining Rowlett and Rockwall, and other minor bridges exist on Rowlett Road and Miller Road. Also, a railway crossing formerly operated by Missouri–Kansas–Texas Railroad, now part of Union Pacific, crosses the Muddy Creek inlet and joins the I-30 causeway.

== Fishing ==
The lake contains a large population of hybrid striped bass, white bass, largemouth bass, channel catfish, blue catfish, white crappie and black crappie.

== See also ==
- Trinity River Authority
