= Trinity River Authority =

Government-owned water corporation in Texas

- Abbreviation: TRA
- Formation: 1955
- Type: Government-owned corporation
- Purpose: Water conservation and reclamation
- Headquarters: Arlington, Texas
- Region served: All or part of 17 counties in Texas
- General Manager: J. Kevin Ward
- Main organ: Board of Directors
- Website: http://www.trinityra.org/

The Trinity River Authority (TRA) was formed in 1955 by the Texas legislature. Its main concerns are water supply and water conservation in the Trinity River Basin. The authority extends over 17,965 square miles (46,529 km^{2}), including all or part of 17 counties. The general offices of the authority are located in Arlington, Texas.

TRA is a self-funded entity from its operations; it receives no state appropriations or taxes.

== Leadership ==
TRA is governed by a 25-member board of directors, all of whom are appointed by the Governor of Texas for six-year terms. Roughly 1/3 of the board is reappointed or replaced every two years. The board, in turn, hires the General Manager, who oversees TRA's operations.

Under the statute creating the TRA, the board members are appointed as follows:

- Four members must be appointed from residents of Dallas County
- Three members must be appointed from residents of Tarrant County
- One member must be appointed from residents of each of the following counties (15 in total): Anderson, Chambers, Ellis, Freestone, Henderson, Houston, Kaufman, Leon, Liberty, Madison, Navarro, Polk, San Jacinto, Trinity, and Walker
- Three members are appointed at-large but must be residents of a county within TRA's jurisdiction

== Dams and reservoirs ==
Since 1911, 31 major reservoirs have been constructed in the drainage basin of the Trinity River, 29 of which fall under the jurisdiction of the Trinity River Authority.

- Lake Anahuac
- Lake Arlington (Texas)
- Lake Amon G. Carter
- Lake Bardwell
- Benbrook Lake
- Lake Bridgeport
- Cedar Creek Reservoir
- Fairfield Lake
- Grapevine Lake
- Lake Halbert
- Houston County Lake
- Lake Ray Hubbard
- Lake Lavon
- Lewisville Lake
- Lost Creek Reservoir
- Lake Livingston
- Eagle Mountain Lake
- Joe Pool Lake
- Mountain Creek Lake
- Navarro Mills Lake
- North Lake
- Richland-Chambers Reservoir
- Ray Roberts Lake
- New Terrell City Lake
- Trinidad Lake
- Wallisville Lake
- Lake Waxahachie
- Lake Weatherford
- Lake Worth

== See also ==
- List of Texas river authorities
- List of Trinity River tributaries
