= Benbrook Lake =

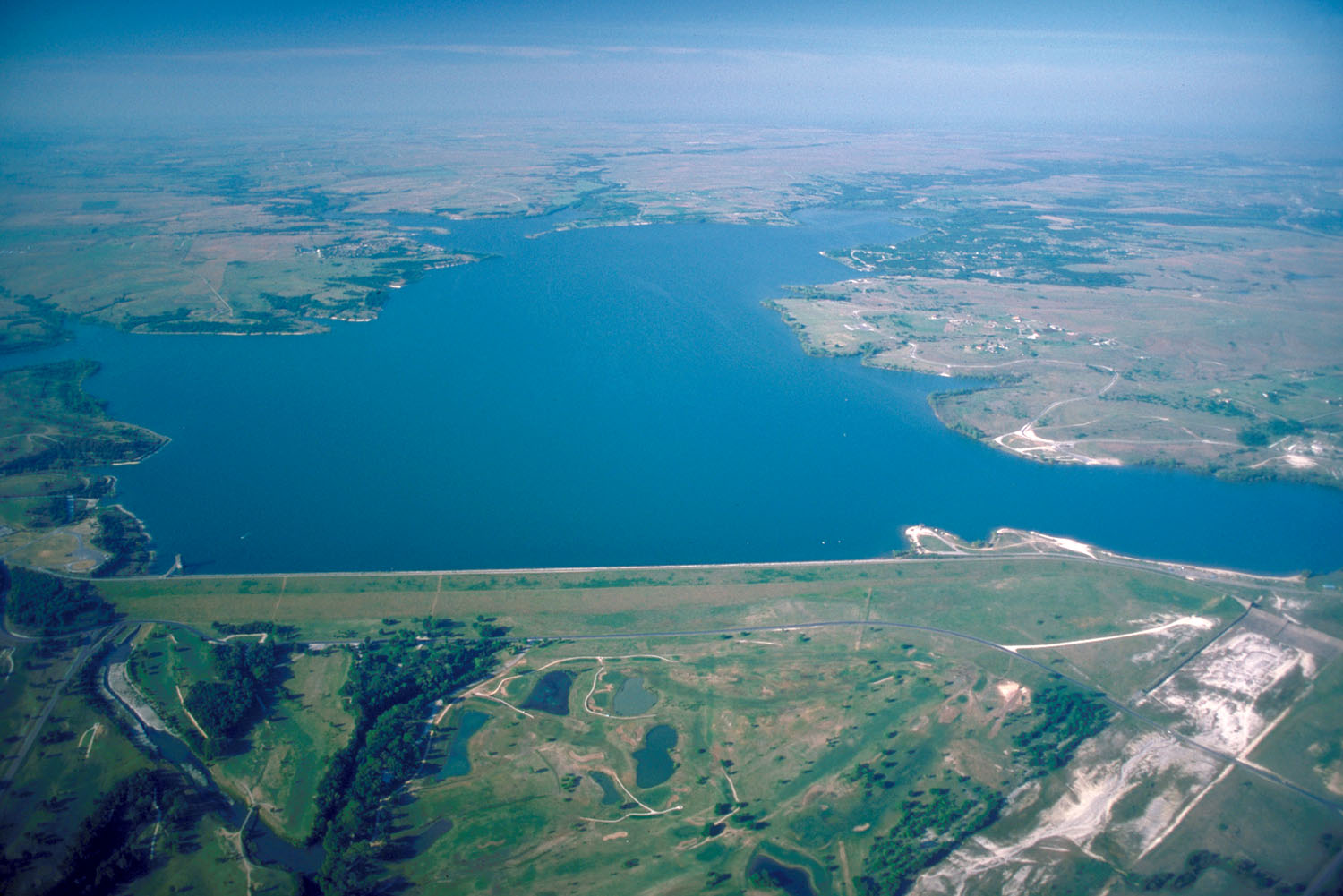
- Lake and Dam

- Location within Texas Location within the United States
- Location: Tarrant County, Texas
- Coordinates: 32°37′57″N 97°27′52″W
- Type: reservoir
- Primary inflows: Clear Fork, Trinity River
- Primary outflows: Clear Fork, Trinity River
- Catchment area: 429 sq mi (1,110 km^{2})
- Basin countries: United States
- Surface area: 3,770 acres (15.3 km^{2}) (normal pool) 7,630 acres (30.9 km^{2}) (flood pool)
- Water volume: 88,250 acre⋅ft (0.10885 km^{3})
- Surface elevation: 694 ft (212 m) (normal pool) 724 ft (221 m) (flood pool)

Benbrook Lake (also known as Benbrook Reservoir) is a reservoir on the Clear Fork of the Trinity River in Tarrant County, Texas, USA. The lake is located approximately 10 miles (16 km) southwest of the center of Fort Worth, where the Clear Fork and the West Fork of the Trinity River join. The lake is impounded by the Benbrook Dam. The lake and dam are owned and operated by the U.S. Army Corps of Engineers, Fort Worth District.

== History ==
Significant flooding on the Trinity River during May 1908, April 1922 and September 1936 was a primary cause for the development of Corps of Engineers flood control projects in North Texas.

Benbrook Dam and Lake were built by the Galveston District of the Corps of Engineers. During the decade of active civil works construction following World War II, the U.S. Congress provided for the construction of Benbrook Lake, Grapevine Lake, Lavon Lake and Ray Roberts Lake as well as modifications to the existing Garza Dam for the construction of Lewisville Lake. The River & Harbors Act of 1945 authorized these projects for the purposes of flood control and navigation. These lakes and others, along with an extensive floodway system of levees, are operated in a coordinated manner to minimize flooding along the Trinity River floodplain corridor in the Dallas/Fort Worth Metroplex.

A second major influence for development was the desire of commercial interests for a shipping channel along the length of the Trinity River. This project, in its most grandiose design, was envisioned as a 9-foot-deep (2.7 m) by 150-foot-wide (46 m) canal (2.74 × 45.72 m) running upstream from Trinity Bay on the Gulf Coast to Dallas, and west all the way to Fort Worth. Downstream it would connect to the Houston Ship Channel. Twenty-six separate lock and dam projects were constructed. A ship channel is maintained upriver as far as river mile 41 (km 66) near Liberty, Texas. Although unlikely, a navigation channel linking Fort Worth to the Gulf of Mexico could still be constructed.

Water originally intended for use in this navigation channel was only recently reallocated for municipal water use. The Tarrant Regional Water District in 1992 gained these water rights and provides water supply to the cities of Benbrook, Fort Worth, and Weatherford. The Water District has also built pipelines that connect Benbrook Lake with the Fort Worth's Rolling Hills water plant and both Cedar Creek and Richland-Chambers reservoirs southeast of Dallas.

Construction of Benbrook dam began in May 1947 and was practically completed when floodgates were closed and deliberate impoundment was begun in September 1952. The cost to build the lake was $14.5 million ($112 million in 2007 dollars). The rolled-earth embankment is 9,130 feet (2,783 m) in length, including the concrete spillway, and rises 130 feet (39.6 m) above the streambed to an elevation of 747 feet (227.7 m) above sea level. A pair of 6.5-foot (2.0 m) × 13-foot (4.0 m) sliding gates operated by electric cable hoists controls the floodwater releases through the 13-foot-diameter conduit (4.0 m). Two 30-inch-diameter pipes (0.76 m) are provided for low-flow releases to maintain downstream river flows. The concrete spillway for uncontrolled releases is 500 feet (152 m) long, with a 100-foot notch (30 m) in its center.

At the normal, or conservation pool, level of 694 feet (212 m) above sea level, the lake covers 3,770 acres (15 km^{2}). This would increase to 7,630 acres (31 km^{2}) if the lake ever reaches the nominal maximum flood pool elevation of 724, which is also the overall spillway elevation at the top of the center notch.

One design option considered during the planning stages for the lake included an alternate damsite near the current I-20 bridge over the Trinity River, 3.7 feet (1.1 m) downstream from the final, chosen location.

There was much more to construction than simply building the dam. Several railroads, roads and bridges, utility lines and cemeteries were relocated. The largest of these jobs was the rerouting of six miles (10 km) of the Gulf, Colorado and Santa Fe Railway. Gravesites from seven separate cemeteries were relocated to the Benbrook municipal cemetery at Winscott and Mercedes. No significant cultural, archeological or paleontological features existed in the project area, according to the July 1948 preconstruction survey.

== Flooding and operational history ==
Flooding in May 1949 claimed eleven lives in Fort Worth and cost $11 million to local businesses as construction for the dam was beginning. During a spring 1957 flood, the new lake and the downtown flood way prevented $9.3 million in damages, almost recouping the original construction costs of the lake. During this flood, the lake filled to its 694-foot (212 m) conservation level for the first time on May 12, 1957; the spillway elevation of 710 was reached on May 26 that year, with a record pool of 713.35 on June 6, 1957. This elevation was a record that lasted thirty two years, but it was surpassed twice in an eleven-month period from June 1989 to May 1990. The current record pool level is 717.5 feet (218.7 m) above sea level and occurred on May 3, 1990. Flood damages prevented by Benbrook Lake from 1989 through 1991 have pushed the total savings for the life of the lake to more than one billion dollars. When holding floodwaters, the lake pool rises above the normal elevation of 694 feet (212 m). This often requires closing of park roads and other facilities for extended periods.

Design engineers for Lake Benbrook estimated that the lake would rise as high as the 710-foot (220 m) spillway elevation only about every forty years, and elevations of 715 feet (218 m) or greater would be reached only once every one hundred years. These estimates show how unusual and remarkable were the flood events of 717 feet (219 m) in May 1989, 718 feet (219 m) in May 1990, and 713 feet (217 m) in December 1991.

=== Flooding History at Benbrook Lake ===
The idea of a flood control reservoir like Benbrook Lake is that floodwaters from heavy rains are retained above the dam. This reduces river flows downstream of the dam and therefore prevents property damage and losses; however, lake levels above the dam rise, and lands surrounding the lake are inundated. In other words, flooding is not eliminated, but its location is predetermined—it will be along the undeveloped lakeshore area upstream of the dam, rather than along the industrialized or populated downstream river valley.

Water releases from Benbrook Lake are made primarily through a 13-foot-diameter (4.0 m) gated conduit at the southeast end of the dam. When waters rise too quickly to be released by this method, the lake may flow over the uncontrolled spillway at the northwest end of the dam. This spillway is a 500-foot-wide (150 m) concrete weir with a 50-foot-wide (15 m), 14-foot-deep (4.3 m) notch in its center. As of 2005, there have only been five occasions on which the lake has been high enough for water to come over the spillway and through this notch. The lake has never been high enough to go over the entire width of the spillway, as it was designed that this should happen only during a 100-year flood event.

=== 1957 Flooding ===
Spring rains in 1957 first filled the lake to its normal conservation pool elevation of 694 NGVD (National Geodetic Vertical Datum or feet above sea level) for the first time. Lake waters rose some 30 feet (9.1 m) from April 1 through May 12 of that year, and by May 26 had risen another sixteen feet, overtopping the 710-foot (220 m) spillway elevation for the first time.

Releases through the spillway continued for almost a month until June 21. The peak elevation was on June 5 as the waters were flowing through the 50-foot-wide spillway notch (15 m) in a stream three feet deep, before falling back to the normal 694 elevation on July 4.

Benbrook Lake then did not reach the 710-foot (220 m) spillway elevation again for more than thirty two years.

=== Flood events of 1989 and 1990 ===
A record low water level occurred in late 1988, as a decade-long drought dropped the lake to 685.7 feet (209.0 m), more than eight feet below normal. The drought ended with heavy rainfall in spring of 1989, and during the next 11 months the lake reached record high levels on two occasions. These record elevations—716.6 in June 1989 and 717.5 in May 1990—were the first instances of spillway operation since the initial occurrence in 1957. During the 1990 peak flow on May 3, the water release was almost 7,000 (198 m^{3}) cubic feet per second. These floods closed all the parks and recreation areas on Benbrook Lake for almost all of those two years, heavily damaging the facilities and shoreline but saving hundreds of millions of dollars in damages in the Fort Worth area downstream of the dam.

=== 1991 Christmas flood ===
A 14-foot (4.3 m) flood crest at an elevation of 708 feet (216 m) was reached in November 1991, but all of this water was released into the river during the next month, before winter rains again raised the lake to elevation 712 on Christmas Eve of that year. If the earlier floodwaters had remained in the lake, the addition of those December rains would have pushed Benbrook Lake to a record elevation of more than 722. Even at this elevation, the releases through the spillway would have been well within the spillway “notch” level, the top of which is 724 feet (221 m).

== See also ==
- Trinity River Authority
