= Mountain Creek (disambiguation) =

Mountain Creek can refer to one of the following:

== Australia ==
- Mountain Creek, Queensland, a suburb in Sunshine Coast Region in Queensland
  - Mountain Creek State High School

== United States ==
- Mountain Creek, Chilton, Alabama
- Mountain Creek, a ski resort located in Vernon Township, New Jersey
  - Mountain Creek Waterpark, a waterpark originally operating under the name Action Park from 1978 to 1996 and from 2014 to 2016.
- Mountain Creek, a tributary of Swabia Creek, Macungie, Pennsylvania
- Mountain Creek (Georges Creek tributary), a stream in Fayette County, Pennsylvania
- Mountain Creek Lake, a reservoir in Dallas, Texas
  - Mountain Creek Lake Bridge, an eponymous bridge
- Mountain Creek, North Texas
