= Tarrant Regional Water District =

The Tarrant Regional Water District (TRWD) is a water district in Texas. It provides raw water for over 2.1 million people, implements vital flood control measures and creates recreational opportunities for the residents of 11 North Texas Counties. Today, TRWD is led by a publicly elected five-member board and owns/operates four major reservoirs, including Lake Bridgeport, Eagle Mountain Lake, Cedar Creek Reservoir and Richland-Chambers Reservoir. TRWD has also constructed more than 150 miles of water pipelines, 27 miles of floodway levees, more than 72 miles of Trinity River Trails and a 2,000 acre wetland water reuse project designed to increase future water supplies for the area.

== History ==
A devastating flood occurred in Fort Worth on April 12, 1922. The damage and loss of life was catastrophic. As a result, the Tarrant County Commissioner's Court on October 7, 1924, created the Tarrant County Water Improvement District Number One. The District's primary role was to provide flood control within Tarrant County.

Two years later, however, the responsibility of the District was expanded to include water supply. On January 12, 1926, the District became the Tarrant County Water Control and Improvement District Number One. The primary roles of the District continues to be flood control and water supply under Article 16, Section 59 in the Texas Constitution. The District is considered a General Law District and operates under Vernon's Texas Civil Statues Article 8280–207. On October 1, 1996, with State approval, the name is changed to Tarrant Regional Water District to reflect that the District services more than just Tarrant County.

Tarrant Regional Water District is classified as a regional district under Texas law. The district is managed by five directors. Directors must reside inside the Tarrant Regional Water District and be at least eighteen (18) years of age.

== West Fork Trinity River regulation ==
In 1929, a contractor was awarded the contract to construct Bridgeport and Eagle Mountain reservoirs, on the West Fork of the Trinity River.

Lake Bridgeport, located primarily in west Wise County, was the first reservoir constructed by the Tarrant Regional Water District. There is now a town called Lake Bridgeport at the lake.

Eagle Mountain Lake is another reservoir constructed by the District.

== Reservoirs ==
The following reservoirs are managed and controlled by TRWD for flood control and/or water supply:

- Lake Bridgeport
- Eagle Mountain Lake
- Richland-Chambers Reservoir
- Cedar Creek Reservoir (Texas)

Lakes on which TRWD holds water rights or operating agreements:

- Lake Arlington
- Benbrook Lake
- Lake Worth

Passive flood control lakes constructed or maintained by TRWD:

- Marine Creek Lake (Fort Worth, Texas)
- Cement Creek Lake (Fort Worth, Texas)
