= Grapevine Lake =

Reservoir in Texas, United States

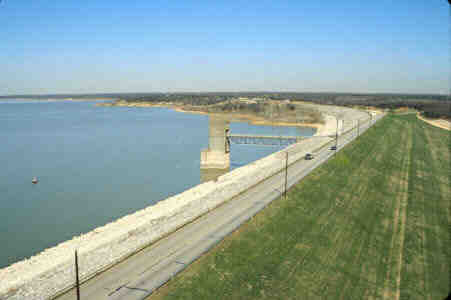
- The reservoir's earthen dam

- Location within Texas Location within the United States

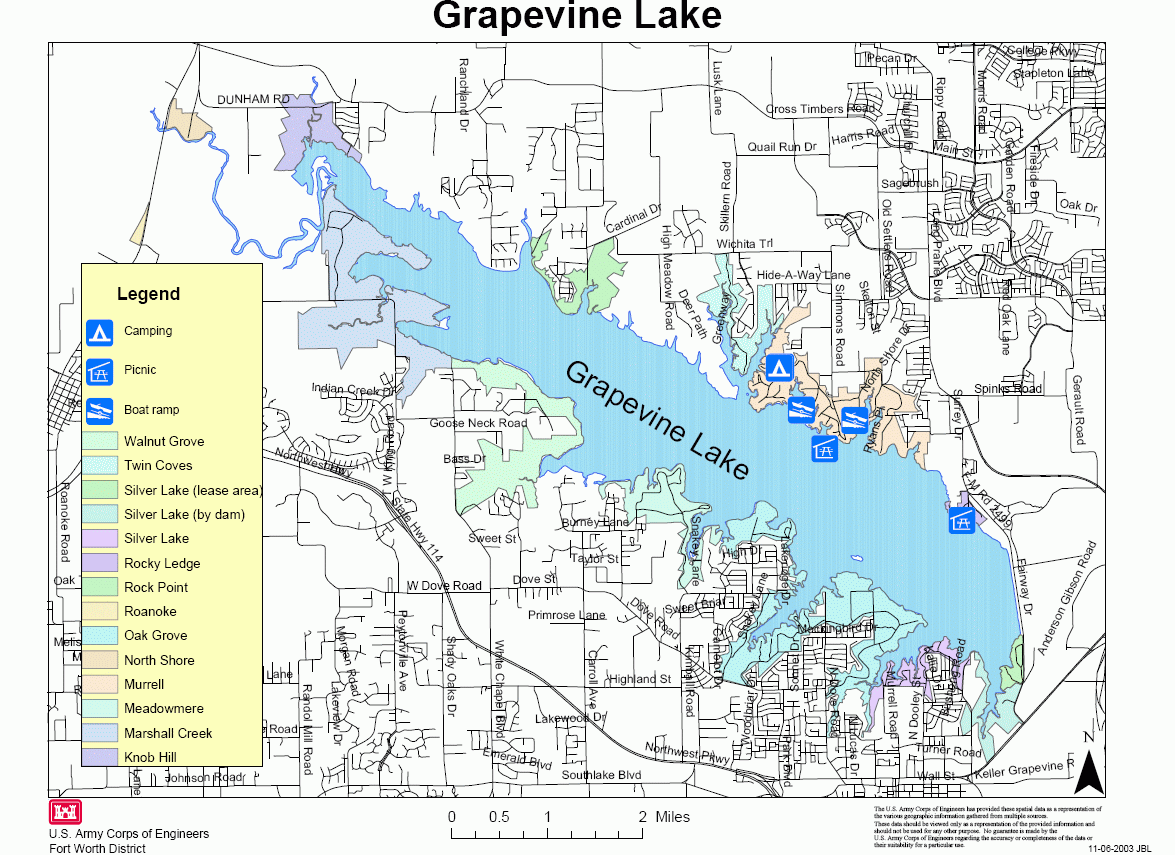
- Reservoir and its parks
- Location: Denton / Tarrant counties, North Texas, United States
- Coordinates: 32°58′20″N 97°3′24″W
- Type: Reservoir
- Primary inflows: Denton Creek
- Primary outflows: Denton Creek
- Basin countries: Texas, United States
- Surface area: 7,280 acres (2,950 ha)
- Max. depth: 65 ft (20 m)
- Water volume: 181,100 acre⋅ft (0.2234 km^{3})
- Shore length^{1}: 60 miles (97 km)
- Surface elevation: 535 ft (163 m)
- Settlements: Grapevine, Texas
- ^{1} Shore length is not a well-defined measure.

Grapevine Lake is a reservoir in North Texas about 20 mi (32 km) northwest of Dallas and northeast of Fort Worth. It was impounded in 1952 by the U.S. Army Corps of Engineers when they dammed Denton Creek, a tributary of Trinity River.

The reservoir's primary purposes are flood control and to act as a municipal water reservoir, with a secondary function of providing recreation and open-space areas. The lake's name comes from the city of Grapevine, Texas, to which the lake is adjacent.

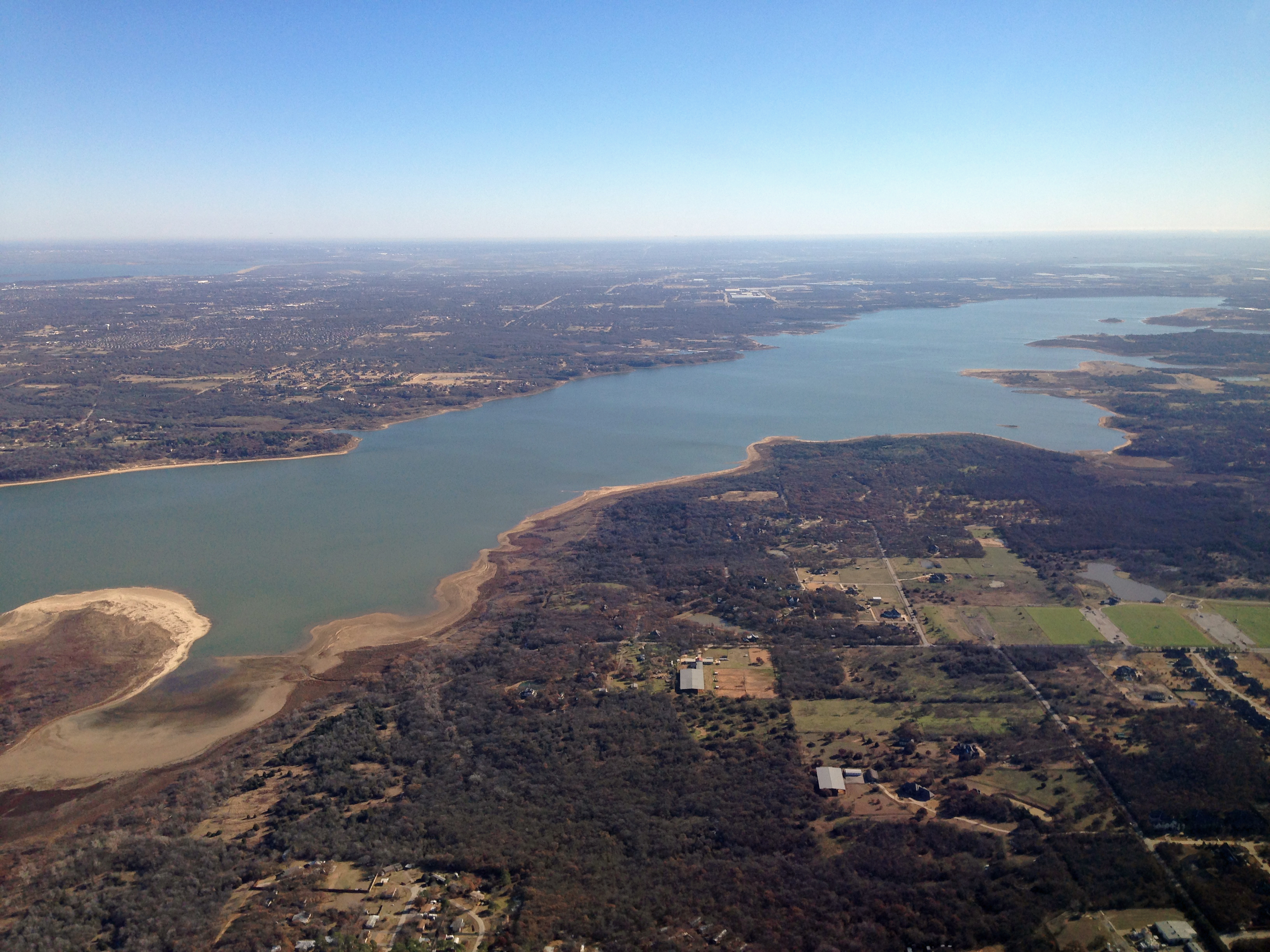
Grapevine Lake from the southwest

== History and construction ==
On March 2, 1945, the U.S. Congress approved the River and Harbors Act of 1945, which among many projects, provided for the construction of Benbrook Lake, Grapevine Lake, Lavon Lake, and Ray Roberts Lake, as well as modifications to the existing Garza Dam for the construction of Lewisville Lake. All the projects were for the purposes of both flood control and navigation. These lakes became part of an extensive floodway system that is operated in a coordinated manner to minimize flooding along the Trinity River floodplain.

The Grapevine Dam and Reservoir project, as it was originally known, was initiated in January 1948. Located on Denton Creek, a tributary of the Elm Fork of the Trinity River, the project spans parts of both Tarrant and Denton Counties. In this area immediately north of the City of Grapevine, the Corps of Engineers obtained about 15,700 acres (64 km^{2}) of land and placed easements on another 2,200 acres (8.9 km^{2}) to be flooded by the new reservoir. The project was completed in June 1952, and impounding of water began July 3, 1952.

== Statistics ==
The dam is a rolled earth-fill type, 28 feet (8.5 m) thick, which spans 12,850 feet (3,920 m). The crest of the dam is located at 588 feet (179 m) above sea level. At the dam, the original creek bed was at 451 feet (137 m), making the dam roughly 137 ft (42 m) tall.

The dam's spillway is located at around 560 feet (170 m) above sea level. This gives it a flood capacity of at least 425,500 acre-feet (524,800,000 m^{3}), including an allowance for the build-up of sediment in the lake's bottom. Typically, the lake is maintained near its conservation level, at 535 ft (163 m), giving it a capacity of 181,100 acre-feet (223,400,000 m^{3}) and a surface area of 7,280 acres (29.5 km^{2}).

At conservation level, the lake has nearly 60 mi (97 km) of shoreline.

== Water rights ==
Three municipalities have water rights to the lake: Grapevine, Dallas, and the Dallas County Park Cities, which provides water to various communities in Dallas County.

Under its September 1953 contract, Grapevine obtained 1,250 acre-feet (1,540,000 m^{3}) of the water in the elevations between 500 and 535 feet (152 and 163 m) above sea level. In February 1981, the city obtained an additional 25,000 acre-feet (31,000,000 m^{3}) in the same elevations "until such time as this [water] is needed for navigation purposes." In March 1953, the city of Dallas obtained 85,000 acre-feet (105,000,000 m^{3}) of the water between 500 and 535 feet (152 and 163 m), and in March 1955, DCPC obtained 50,000 acre-feet (62,000,000 m^{3}) at the same elevations.

== Recreation ==
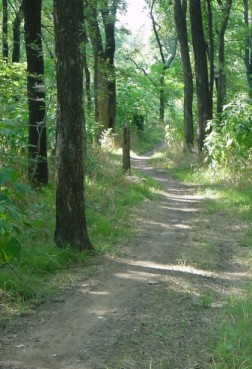
Crosstimbers horse trail

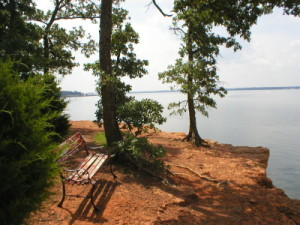
The north shore of Grapevine Lake

=== Parks and trails ===
Numerous parks surround the lake. Some of the parks are owned, leased, or maintained by the local community. Others remain in the Corps of Engineers' control. The area contains 30 miles (48 km) of natural surface trails, including nature, biking, and equestrian trails.

Trails listed by the Corps of Engineers include the 9-mile (14 km) Northshore trail, the 3-mile (4.8 km) Rocky Point trail, the 5-mile (8.0 km) Crosstimbers horse trail, and the 4-mile (6.4 km) Knob Hill trail.

=== Camping ===
The lake has primitive camping, prepared camping sites, and trailer/RV camping. Murrell Park currently has tent and primitive camping, but is undergoing an expansion to increase camping facilities. Meadowmere Park, managed by the city of Grapevine, offers primitive tent camping. Vineyards campground and cabins, managed by the city of Grapevine, offers RV camping sites, and cabins. Twin Coves Park is managed by the Town of Flower Mound and offers RV sites along with cabins and primitive camping.

=== Marinas and boating ===
Three marinas are located on the lake, all operated by the private company Marinas International. On the south shore, in Grapevine, are Scott's Landing and Silver Lake. On the north shore, in Flower Mound, is Twin Coves. The marinas support an active boating community on the lake; combined, the three marinas have around 1,400 moorings, with land-based storage for an additional 575 vessels.

Both the Grapevine Sailing Club and the United States Coast Guard Auxiliary (Flotilla 5-11 of District 8) are based at Scott's Landing.

Twelve boat ramps provide access to the lake, of which only the two ramps at Murrell Park are controlled by the Corps of Engineers and available for free. Of the remaining ramps:

- The City of Trophy Club operates Trophy Club Park (formerly Marshall Creek Park), which includes a fee-based ramp ($5 for boats on trailers, $1 for kayaks and canoes).
- The City of Grapevine operates public fee-based ramps at Meadowmere, Lakeview, Oak Grove, and Katie's Woods parks.
- The private company Marinas International operates a fee-based ramp at Silver Lake Marina.
- The City of Flower Mound operates a fee-based boat ramp at Twin Coves Park ($10 daily park access fee with annual pass available).

=== Fishing and hunting ===
The lake is home to a number of fish species, including largemouth bass, spotted bass, white bass, white crappie, channel catfish, and alligator gar. Fishing regulations of most species are managed under statewide regulations. The exception is a 14- to 18-inch (36- to 46-cm) slot limit on largemouth bass; (46 cm). Daily bag limit for all species of black bass is five in any combination. Murrell Park, a premier spot for catching sand and black bass on the north shore, was heavily damaged in the summer 2007 flood and was partially closed.

With a hunting license, hunting permit, and in season, public hunting is allowed on the Corps of Engineers land located at the northwest end of the lake. Waterfowl and small game hunting, as well as bow hunting of feral hogs and deer is permitted. Hunting licenses are obtained from the state of Texas and an additional permit from the U.S. Army Corps of Engineers is required.

On March 24, 2010, Kris Howe found four bones of a 96-million-year-old bird. Two Dallas scientists say that the bird is the oldest in America.

== Adjacency to Dallas/Fort Worth International Airport ==
Grapevine Lake borders Dallas/Fort Worth International Airport to the northwest, making it a major landmark to persons flying into or out of that airport. Many of its features, such as its parks, marinas, and dam, are visible in great detail to the airline passengers upon takeoff or landing.

== See also ==
- Lewisville Lake
- Lake Ray Roberts
- Trinity River Authority

== Notes and references ==
- US Corps of Engineers Pertinent Data - Grapevine Lake
