= Richland-Chambers Reservoir =

- Location within Texas Location within the United States
- Location: Navarro / Freestone counties, Texas, United States
- Coordinates: 31°57′07″N 96°05′56″W
- Type: reservoir
- Primary inflows: Richland Creek and Chambers Creek
- Primary outflows: Richland Creek
- Basin countries: United States
- Surface area: 41,356 acres (16,736 ha)
- Max. depth: 75 ft (23 m)
- Water volume: 1,103,816 acre⋅ft (1.361537 km^{3})
- Surface elevation: 314 ft (96 m)

Richland-Chambers Reservoir is the third largest inland reservoir by surface area and the 8th largest reservoir by water volume in Texas formed by the impoundment of Richland Creek and Chambers Creek east-southeast of the town of Corsicana and south of Kerens, in Navarro County and Freestone County, Texas, USA. It has 330 miles (530 km) of shoreline and is Y-shaped with the dam on the eastern end of the lake.

== History ==
Due to a drought in 1956-1957, plans were made by the Tarrant Regional Water District to build the Richland-Chambers Reservoir with the purpose of being a public water source for Tarrant County. The plan called for a reservoir to be built along with a pipeline between Richland-Chambers and Lake Benbrook. However, no actions were taken until October 1, 1979 when the water district issued $342.75 million in revenue bonds for construction.

The project was designed and engineered by Freese and Nichols, Consulting Engineers, of Fort Worth, Texas. Bill Johnson and a team, from Buce and Gunn, provided the necessary topography and surveying, for the project. Construction began on October 7, 1982. The dam was closed on Richland-Chambers Reservoir July 1987 and filled by May 1989. On November 12, 1988 the Richland-Chambers pipeline became operational.

In 1999 a wetlands project was launched for the purpose of reusing Trinity River water by filtering a portion of the river through wetlands and then into the Richland-Chambers Reservoir. Initially a demonstration project, this has proved successful and is moving into a larger 2,000-acre (8.1 km^{2}) phase. Due to this additional water, plans are in place to build an additional pipeline between the reservoir and Tarrant County.

== Water rights ==
The reservoir was built by the Tarrant Regional Water District (TRWD) who retains most of the water rights. TRWD is a water wholesaler to 11 counties in Texas. This water is pumped from Richland-Chambers via a 90-inch (2,300 mm) pipeline to balancing reservoirs and on to Lake Benbrook for storage before moving to the water treatment plants or Eagle Mountain Lake.

The City of Corsicana holds the rights to 32,807 acre⋅ft (0.040467 km^{3}) of water each year with the option to purchase more. This water is not currently being drawn but a pipeline is being built (2008) to Corsicana for that purpose.

== Fish and plant life ==
Predominant fish species on Richland-Chambers Reservoir include:

- White & hybrid striped bass
- Blue & channel catfish
- Largemouth bass
- Crappie
- Smallmouth buffalo
- Carp

The lake has been stocked with Coppernose bluegill, Florida bass, channel catfish and blue catfish. In the first decade, the lake was noted for largemouth bass tournaments, with typical stringers of 35 lbs. Over the last decade, multiple droughts have diminished the stringer catch to about 25 lbs. The lake is no longer considered as a top bass fishing lake.

The old Trinity River levee forms a crescent-shaped underwater structure between the confluence of the Richland and Chambers creek arms and the dam and is good for fishing.

== Recreational uses ==
Although its primary purpose is as a water supply reservoir, Richland-Chambers Reservoir is a venue for outdoor recreation, including fishing, boating, and swimming. As it's still a relatively new lake, the traffic level is low and land for lakeside housing is plentiful. The Harbor Inn Restaurant & Club, sitting on the banks of the lake adjacent to Northshore Harbor Condominiums, provide a restaurant and bar for visitors of the lake. There are a number of sites to launch boats.

=== Public access areas ===
Primary access if via US 287 with access areas of:

- Northshore Harbor
- Cedar Creek
- Chambers Creek Marina
- FM 2859 Crossing
- Cheneyboro Ramp
- Crab Creek
- Midway Landing
- Oak Cove Marina
- Old Hwy 287 Launch (closed in 2017)
- Highway 309 Park
- Fisherman's Point
