= Big Fossil Creek =

Stream in Tarrant County, Texas, U.S.

Coordinates: 32°53′46″N 97°21′57″W

Big Fossil Creek is a stream in Tarrant County, in the U.S. state of Texas.

Big Fossil Creek was so named on account of the fossils found there by an early settler. The area of North Fort Worth near Big Fossil Creek is occupied indigenous land where Tawakoni, Wichita, Kiikaapoi, Jumanos, and Comanche would overlap/intersect.

The creek's headwaters are located in far northwest Fort Worth near Avondale and Route 287. It then flows southeast through Haltom City, North Richland Hills, and Richland Hills before converging with the West Fork of the Trinity River.

== See also ==
- List of rivers of Texas
