= Lake Bridgeport (Texas) =

Bridgeport Lake
- Location within Texas Location within the United States
- Location: Jack / Wise counties, North Texas
- Coordinates: 33°13′N 97°52′W
- Type: artificial reservoir
- Primary inflows: West Fork of the Trinity River
- Primary outflows: Eagle Mountain Lake
- Catchment area: 1,111 sq mi (2,880 km^{2}) of watershed
- Basin countries: United States
- Max. length: 19 mi (31 km)
- Max. width: 9.5 mi (15.3 km)
- Surface area: 11,954 acres (4,838 ha) (at conservation level)
- Max. depth: 76.5 ft (23.3 m)
- Water volume: 366,236 acre⋅ft (451.745 hm^{3}) (at conservation level)
- Shore length^{1}: 129 mi (208 km)
- Surface elevation: 836 ft (255 m) at conservation pool level
- Islands: Rattlesnake Island, Stripling Island, Steele Island, Horse Island
- Settlements: Runaway Bay, Lake Bridgeport
- ^{1} Shore length is not a well-defined measure.

Lake Bridgeport, also known as Bridgeport Lake, is a man-made, freshwater reservoir located in Wise and Jack Counties in North Texas. The lake was created by damming the West Fork of the Trinity River and sits upstream from Eagle Mountain Lake. The lake is owned by the Tarrant Regional Water District and the water impounded is used for flood control, residential and commercial sales, irrigation, and recreation.

== History ==
Lake Bridgeport has its origins as Bridgeport Reservoir, a component of the Trinity River canalization plan to prevent flooding along the West Fork of the Trinity River. Construction of the lake's dam began in 1929 and was completed in 1931. The estimated cost to complete the project was $2 million.

== Recreation ==
Lake Bridgeport is a popular freshwater fishing destination for anglers. Largemouth bass, crappie, hybrid bass, and sand bass are some of the noted varieties of gamefish caught there. Lake Bridgeport is also a popular recreational boating destination. Boat ramps and marinas are located at various locations throughout the shore. Wise County Park (located on the northern end of the lake) provides camping and day-use facilities.
