= Trinity River National Wildlife Refuge =

National Wildlife Refuge near Cleveland, Texas

- IUCN category IV (habitat/species management area)
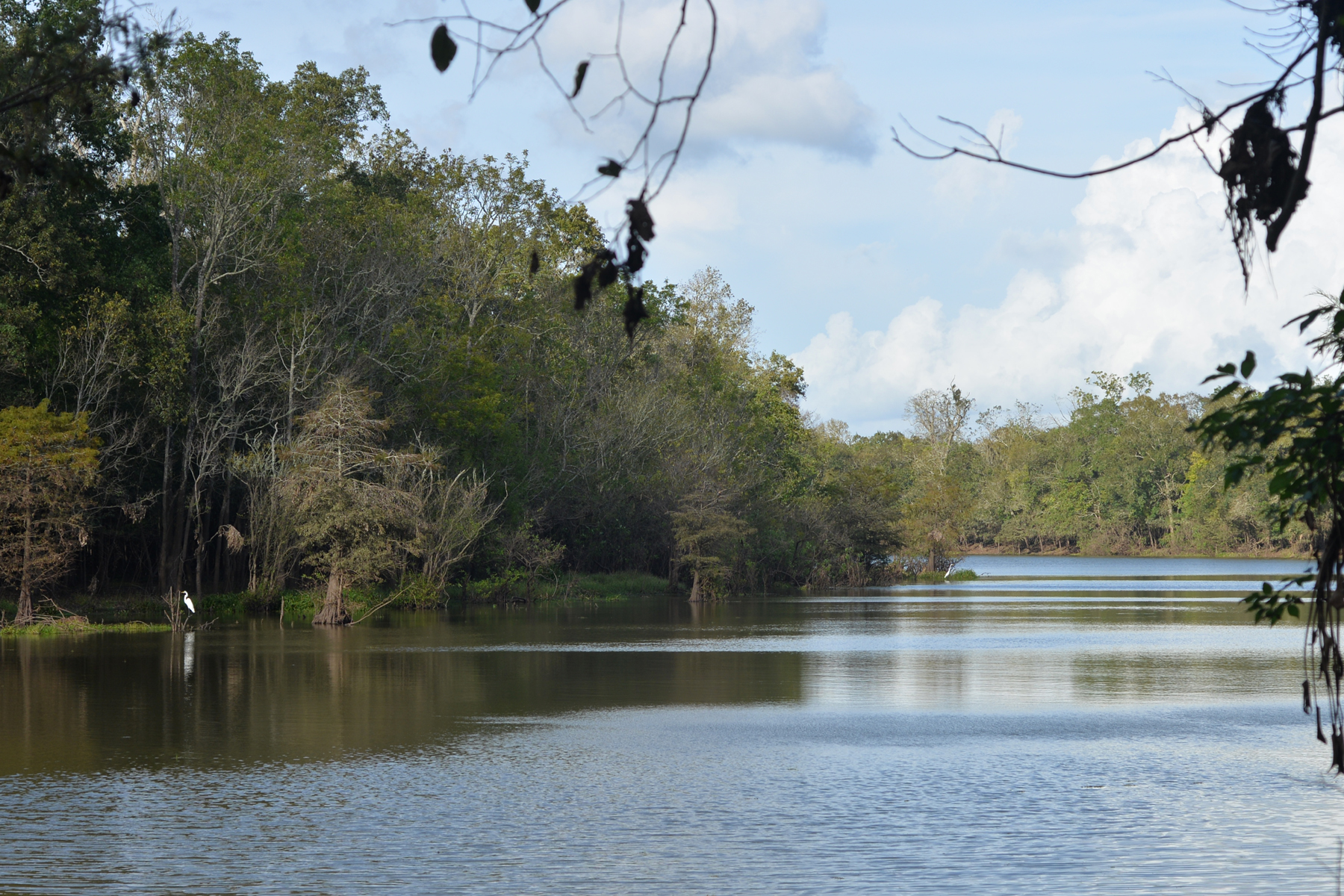
- Josie Lake in the Knobby Knees Unit of the Refuge.

- Location within the United States
- Location: Liberty County, Texas, United States
- Nearest city: Cleveland, Texas
- Coordinates: 30.2877°N 94.7844°W
- Area: 30,000 acres (120 km^{2})
- Established: 1994
- Governing body: U.S. Fish and Wildlife Service
- Website: Trinity River National Wildlife Refuge

Trinity River National Wildlife Refuge was established on January 4, 1994, with an initial purchase of 4,400 acres (18 km^{2}). Since that time, the refuge has acquired additional acreage which now totals 30,000 acres (120 km^{2}). The primary purpose of establishing this refuge is to protect a portion of the bottomland hardwood forest ecosystem along the Trinity River located in southeastern Texas. The refuge, which is a remnant of what was once a much larger natural area is a broad flat floodplain made up of numerous sloughs, oxbow lakes, artesian wells, and tributaries.

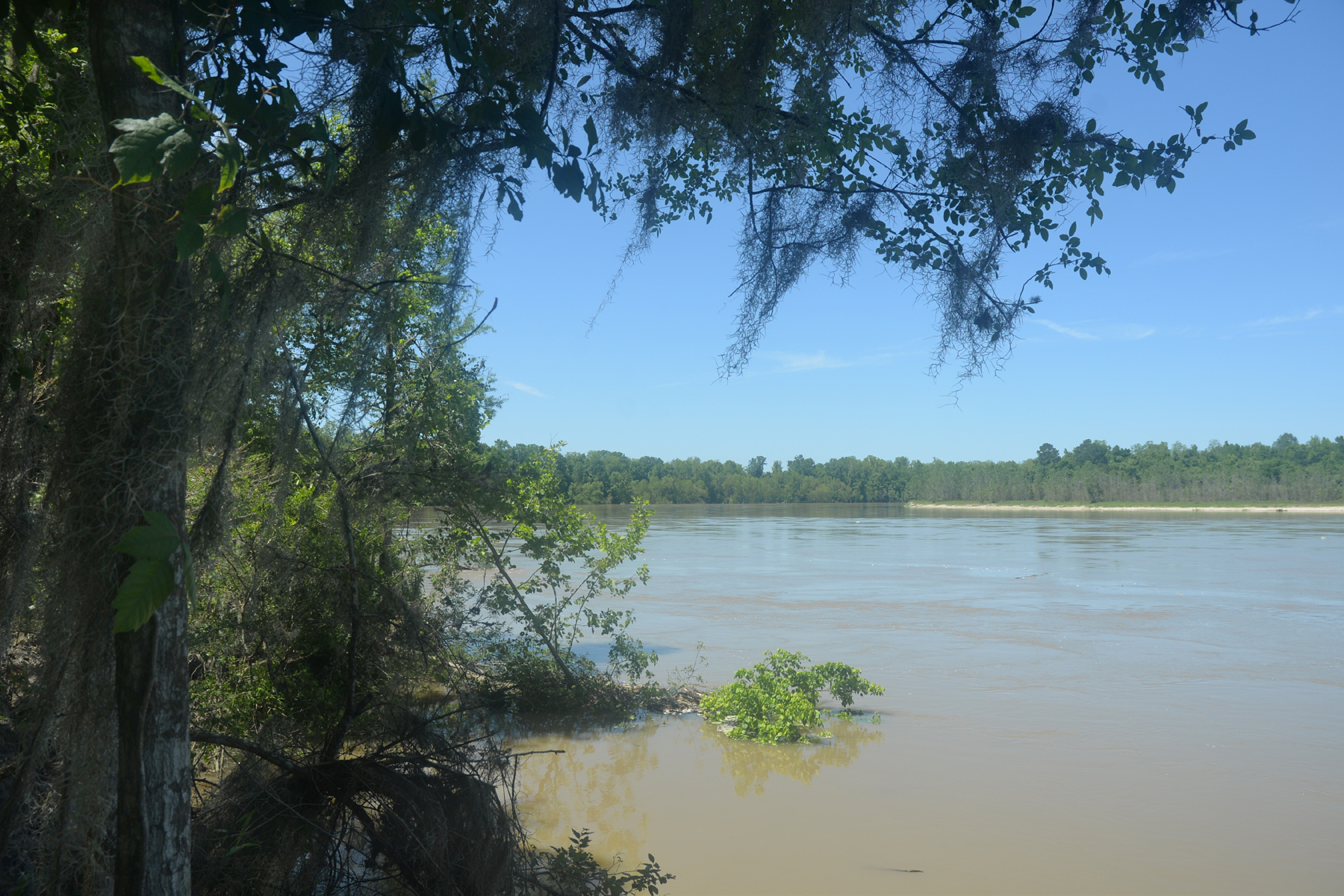
View of the Trinity River in the Page Unit of the National Wildlife Refuge.

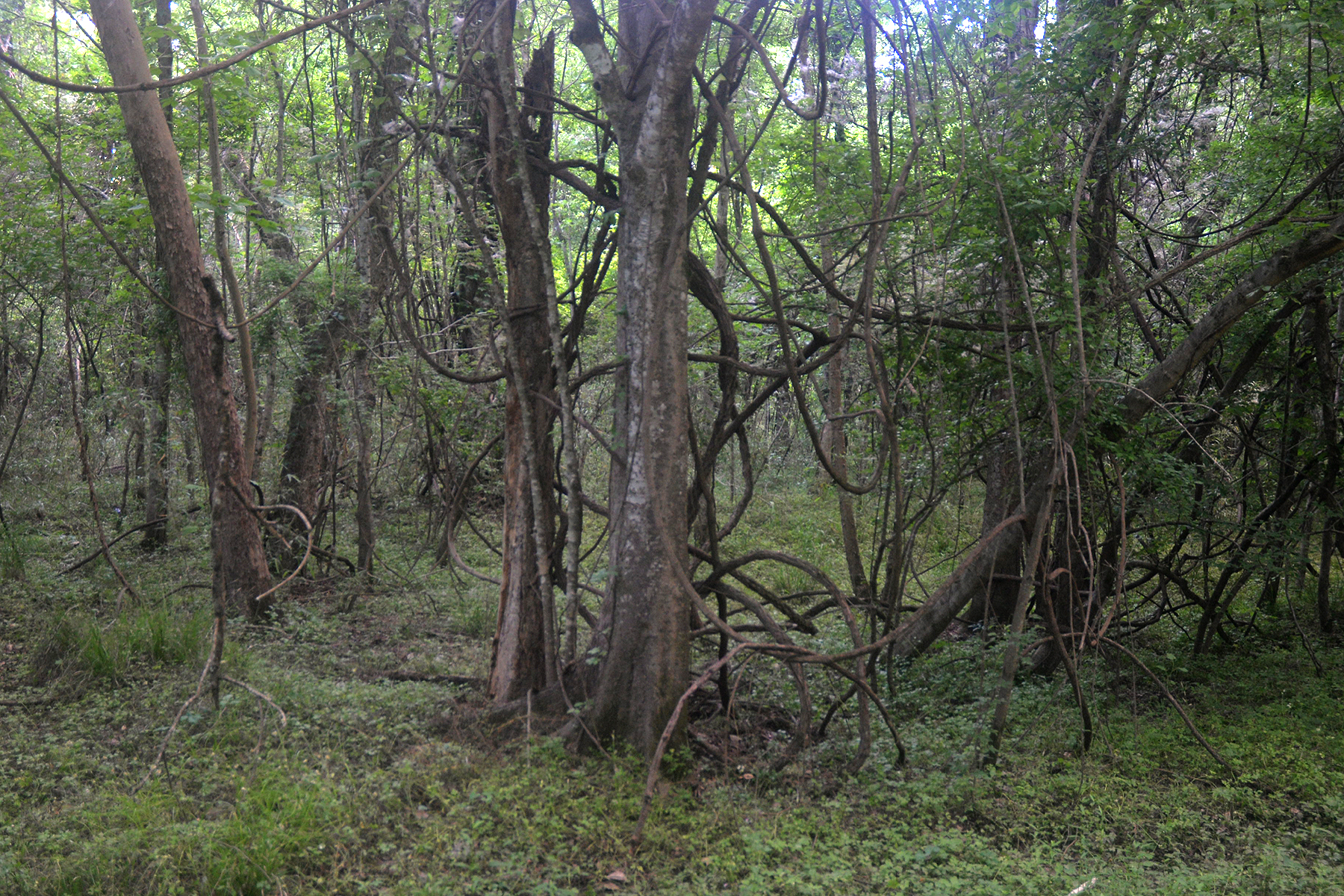
Bottomland hardwood forest in the Page Unit of the Refuge.

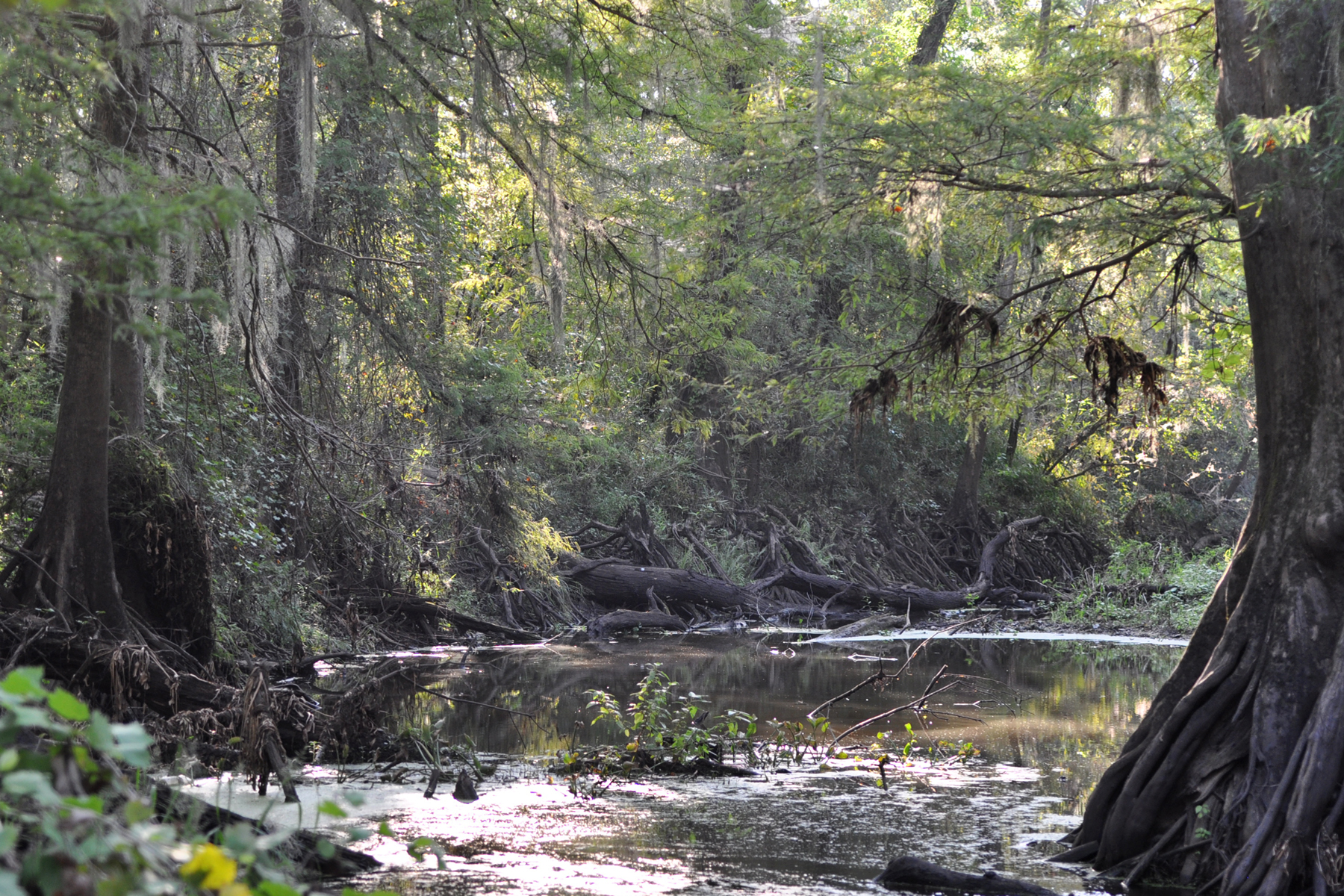
Tanner Bayou in the Brierwood Unit of Trinity River National Wildlife Refuge.

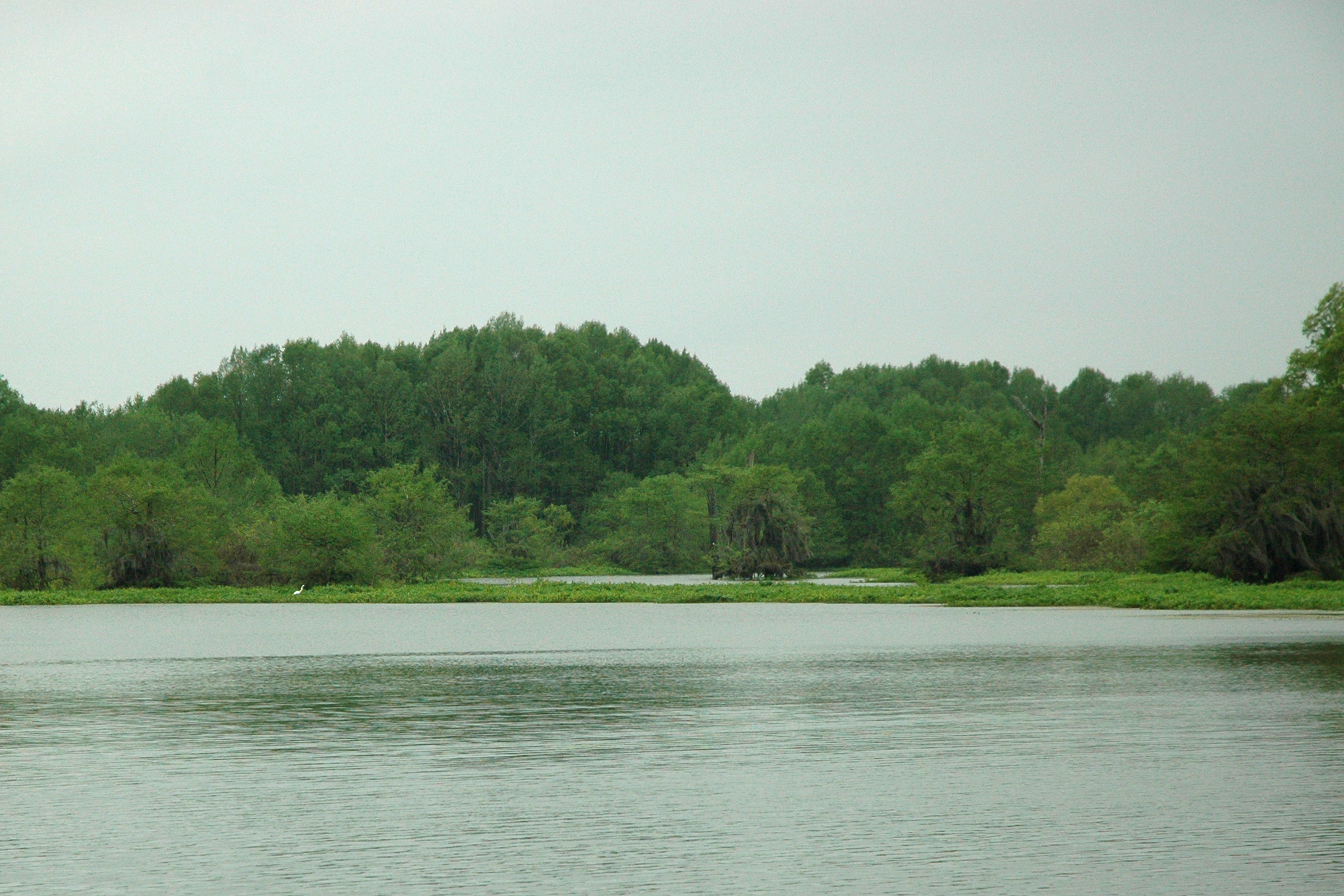
Champion Lake in the Trinity River National Wildlife Refuge.
