= Lewisville Lake Toll Bridge =

Lewisville Lake Toll Bridge (LLTB)
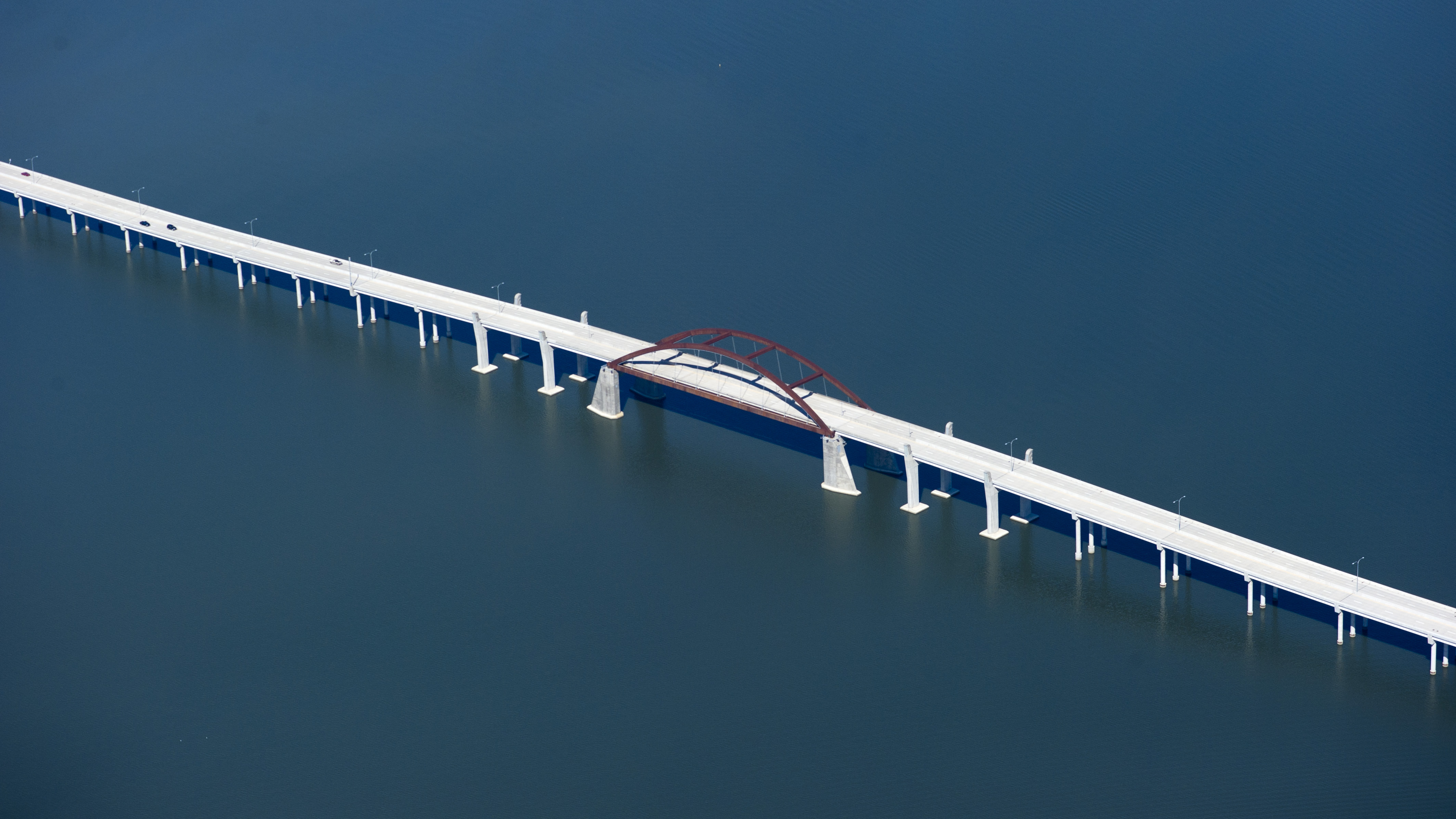
- Coordinates: 33.13949°N 97.00284°W
- Carries: 4 lanes of Eldorado Parkway
- Crosses: Lewisville Lake
- Locale: Lakewood Village and Lake Dallas
- Maintained by: North Texas Tollway Authority (NTTA)

Characteristics
- Design: Tied arch bridge
- Material: Steel, concrete
- Total length: 1.7 miles
- Height: 118 feet (36 m)
- Longest span: 360 feet (110 m)
- Clearance below: 60 feet (18 m) at Pool Level of 522 ft elevation.

History
- Construction start: 2006
- Construction end: 2009
- Opened: August 1, 2009; 17 years ago

Statistics
- Daily traffic: 10,000 (2009 estimates)
- Toll: TollTag $1.55, ZipCash $3.10

Location
- Interactive map of Lewisville Lake Toll Bridge (LLTB)

The Lewisville Lake Toll Bridge (LLTB) is a 1.7-mile (2.7 km) tied arch bridge crossing Lewisville Lake in Denton County, Texas, USA. Operated by North Texas Tollway Authority (NTTA), the four-lane toll bridge connects Swisher Road in Lake Dallas to Eldorado Parkway in Lakewood Village. It is one segment of the 13-mile (21 km) Lewisville Lake Corridor, which connects Interstate 35E and Dallas North Tollway.

The bridge is the second-longest bridge in the North Texas area. Only the State Highway 66 bridge over Lake Ray Hubbard, which connects Rowlett and Rockwall, is longer.

Toll rates across the bridge are $1.55 for TollTag customers and $3.10 for ZipCash drivers.

== Design ==
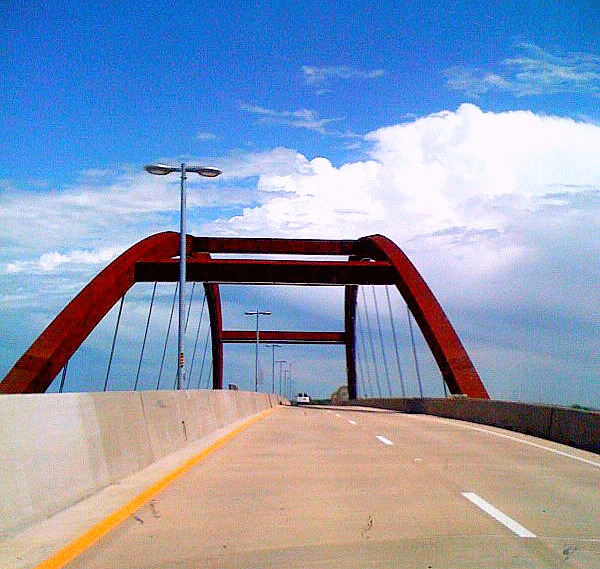
Bridge archway in April 2010

The bridge is 60 feet (18 m) above the normal water level to allow clearance for sailboats.

At the center of the bridge is a 360-foot (110 m) steel arch that rises 60 feet (18 m) above the road deck. The arch's design resembles the arch on the Pennybacker Bridge in Austin. At night, the arch is illuminated using LEDs, making the structure visible from the surrounding shores of the lake.

== History ==
A bridge previously connected Little Elm and Lake Dallas, but it was removed in the 1950s when the United States Army Corps of Engineers expanded Lewisville Lake. The old bridge provided a vital transportation link between Lake Dallas and Little Elm.

On August 1, 2009, a 5K charity run crossing the completed bridge was held. The run, which served as a fundraiser for local food banks, was the only time pedestrians will ever be allowed to cross the bridge. The bridge opened to vehicular traffic after the event was completed.

=== Project Costs ===
- Project Cost Estimate: $220 million (entire corridor)
- Estimated NTTA Cost: $122 million (toll bridge only)

=== Key Dates ===
- May 2005 - The NTTA Board of Directors selected a preliminary design of the bridge, which features a distinctive tied arch spanning 360 feet (110 m) at the center with approaches and thresholds flanked by pairs of lighted columns.
- Late 2005 - A Finding of No Significant Impact (FONSI) for the Environmental Impact Assessment is received
- Early 2006 - Completion of plans, specifications and estimates on the toll bridge and public hearings for sections 4-6 and 8. Design for sections 4-6 initiated.
- Spring 2006 - Denton County broke ground on Section 1, west of the bridge, and construction is under way.
- Summer 2006 - Construction on Section 3, the eastern approach to the bridge, is planned to begin in late summer 2006.
- January 2007 - Groundbreaking for the bridge was held in Denton County on January 31, 2007
- May 2007 - Crews have built and placed many of the rebar frames for the support columns on the west bank and will soon begin pouring concrete into them.
- May 2008 - Construction of the bridge reached the halfway point.
- January 2009 - All four corner pieces of the arch structure are in place.
- April 2009 - The last major rib arch piece was installed. Construction is approximately 90% complete.
- August 1, 2009 - Charity run and walk across bridge. Bridge opens to vehicular traffic.
- February 28, 2010 - Last portions of the construction work are completed, including work on the arch lighting.

== Corridor ==
The Lewisville Lake Corridor is approximately 13.8 miles long and is divided into eight sections constructed by Denton County, NTTA, the Texas Department of Transportation, Little Elm, and Frisco. NTTA funded and constructed the toll bridge, while the other partners funded improvements to the roadways approaching the bridge. Only the bridge itself is tolled.

== See also ==
- Denton County, Texas
- Frisco, Texas
- Lake Dallas, Texas
- Lakewood Village, Texas
