= Walnut Creek (Tarrant County) =

Creek in northern Texas

Coordinates: 32°34′14″N 97°07′51″W

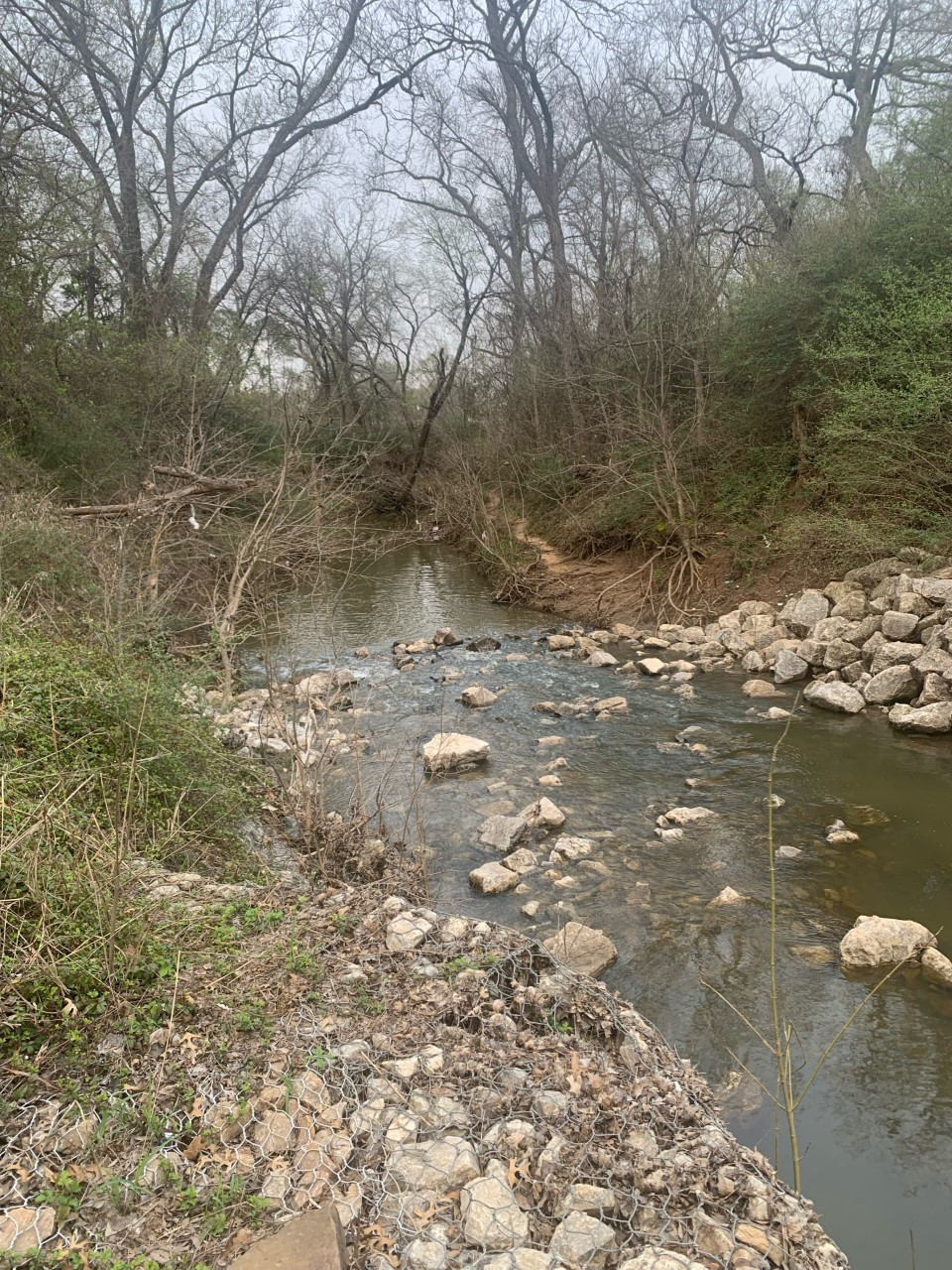
Walnut Creek in Mansfield

Walnut Creek is a creek in North Texas. The creek rises to the northeast of Keene in Johnson County, flowing to the Tarrant County near Mansfield. A number of smaller branches flow into the creek, including Watson Branch, and The creek runs to the northeast, forming the border between Dallas and Grand Prairie. The mouth of the creek is west of Duncanville where it meets Mountain Creek.

== Walnut Creek Linear Park ==
Walnut Creek Linear Park is a public walking trail in Mansfield. The trail follows the course of the creek, and forms a linear connection with various public parks in the city, including Town Park, Katherine Rose Memorial Park and James McKnight Park. A further extension is planned, which will connect the park to the western shores of Joe Pool Lake.

== Watson Branch ==
Watson Branch is a small tributary of Walnut Creek. The stream rises in north Mansfield, flowing to the east, lending its name to the Watson Branch Park. The stream passes under Mouser Way before meeting Walnut Creek near U.S. Route 287.

The Watson Branch park is spread across 10-acres, featuring a playground and a walking trail by the creek was opened on Earth Day 2023 alongside Watson Branch, a tributary that joins Walnut Creek near U.S. Route 287.
