= Richland Creek (Texas) =

- Map

Location
- Country: Texas, United States
- State: Texas

Physical characteristics
- Source
  - location: 31.9424°N 96.3932°W
- Basin size: Trinity River Basin

Richland Creek is a stream in Texas.

It is a tributary of the Trinity River and is partially dammed to create Richland Chambers Reservoir. The Dam changed the course of the river that previously ran south through the Richland Creek Wildlife Management Area. The redirection deprived the WMA of needed water so six pumping stations were installed.

== See also ==
- Trinity River tributaries
- List of rivers of Texas
