= Mountain Creek, Texas =

Creek in northern Texas

Coordinates: 32°40′50″N 96°58′23″W

Mountain Creek is a creek in North Texas. The creek rises near Alvarado in eastern Johnson County. It flows northeast for thirty-eight miles, forming a boundary between Grand Prairie and Dallas, where it meets Mountain Creek Lake, the mouth of the creek is on the West Fork of the Trinity River. Walnut Creek is a tributary of the creek.
