= Mountain Creek Lake =

- Location within Texas Location within the United States
- Location: Dallas, Texas
- Coordinates: 32°43′05″N 96°57′40″W
- Type: reservoir
- Primary inflows: Mountain Creek
- Primary outflows: Mountain Creek
- Catchment area: 295 sq mi (764 km^{2})
- Basin countries: United States
- Max. length: 2.75 miles (4.43 km)
- Max. width: 2 miles (3.22 km)
- Surface area: 2,710 acres (10.97 km^{2})
- Water volume: 22,840 acre⋅ft (28,170,000 m^{3})
- Surface elevation: 458 feet (140 m)
- Settlements: Dallas

Mountain Creek Lake is a reservoir located 8 miles (13 km) southwest of Downtown Dallas, Texas, United States, in the Mountain Creek area of the city. It is located south of SH 180, west of Spur 408, north of I-20, and east of FM 1382. The defunct Naval Air Station Dallas (Hensley Field), now an Armed Forces Reserve Center, is located on the northern shore of the lake. Mountain Creek Lake Park is on the lake's southeastern and southwestern edges.

The Texas Department of State Health Services in April 1996 issued a ban on keeping or eating fish due to high contamination levels of PCBs and other toxic chemicals. The ban was lifted in 2010, but TDSHS advised against consuming any fish caught in the lake. Contaminants entered the lake from the Dallas Naval Air Station and industrial facilities such as an airport factory and power plant. In 2017, TDSHS updated its advisory to mention that White Crappie were now safe to eat, while Channel and Flathead Catfish, Largemouth Bass, and White Bass may be eaten in limited amounts. Other types of fish such as Common Carp, Freshwater Drum, or Smallmouth Buffalo are still deemed unsafe to eat.

== History ==
Construction on Mountain Creek Dam began in 1929, and the dam was complete in early 1937. The reservoir was designed as a cooling reservoir for a Dallas Power and Light Company electric power plant. The original permit for the lake suggested a capacity of 40,000 acre-feet (49,000,000 m^{3}), but the capacity in 1992 was only 22,840 acre-feet (28,170,000 m^{3}) because of heavy siltation.

== See also ==
- Mountain Creek Lake Bridge
- Trinity River Authority
- Mountain Creek, Texas
