= Lewisville Lake =

Reservoir in Texas, United States

- Lake Dallas (previously)
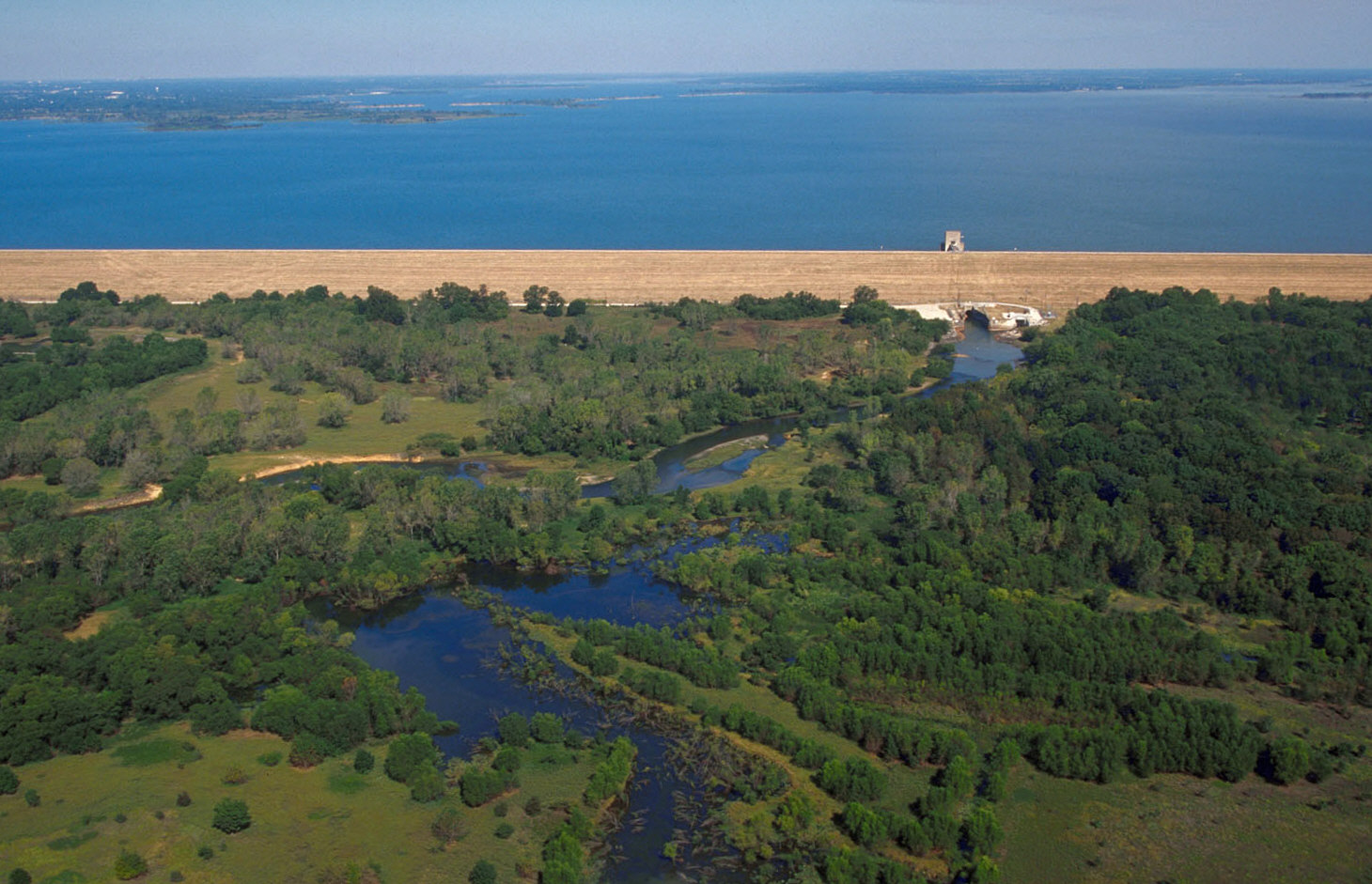
- Aerial view of Lewisville Lake and Dam

- Location within Texas Location within the United States
- Location: Denton County, Texas
- Coordinates: 33°04′09″N 96°57′52″W
- Type: reservoir
- Primary inflows: Elm Fork of the Trinity River
- Catchment area: 325,700 acres (1,318 km^{2})
- Basin countries: United States
- Managing agency: United States Army Corps of Engineers
- Built: 1948
- First flooded: 1955
- Max. length: 11 mi (18 km)
- Max. width: 4.24 mi (6.82 km)
- Surface area: 29,592 acres (11,975 ha)
- Max. depth: 67 ft (20 m)
- Water volume: 555,000 acre⋅ft (685,000,000 m^{3})
- Surface elevation: 522 ft (159 m)
- Frozen: 16 February 2021
- Islands: has islands and islets
- Settlements: Lewisville, Texas

Lewisville Lake, formerly known as Garza-Little Elm Reservoir, is a reservoir in North Texas (USA) on the Elm Fork of the Trinity River in Denton County near Lewisville. Originally engineered in 1927 as Lake Dallas, the reservoir was expanded in the 1940s and 1950s and renamed Lewisville Lake. It was built for flood control purposes and to serve as a water source for Dallas and its suburbs, but residents also use it for recreational purposes.

== History ==
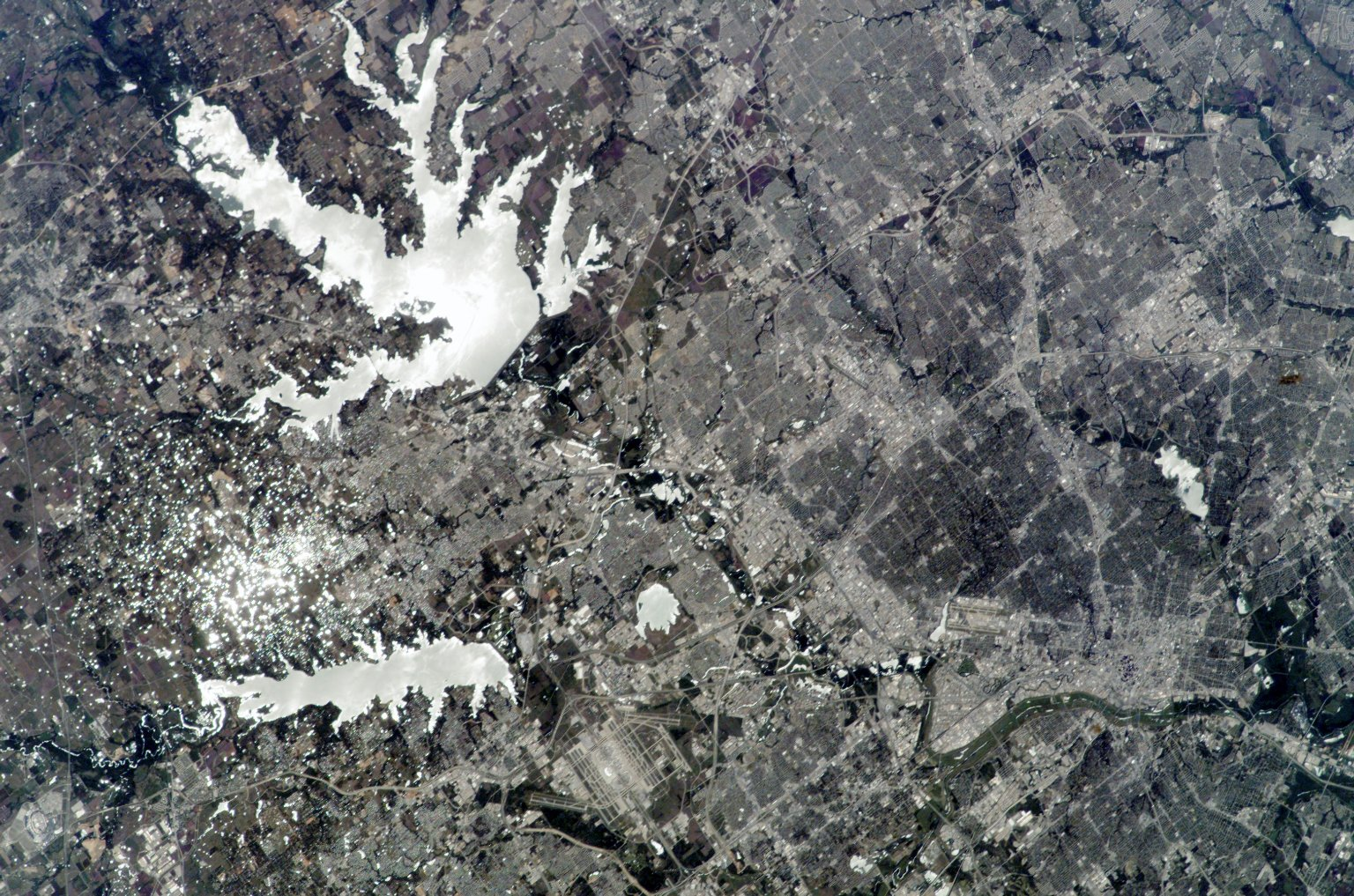
The lake as seen from space in 2009

Lewisville Lake is the second lake to impound the waters of the Elm Fork of the Trinity River in this area. The W.E. Callahan Construction Company completed the Garza Dam in 1927 at a cost of $5 million, which created Lake Dallas. The dam was 10,890 feet (3,320 m) long with a 567-foot (173 m) long service spillway. The lake, with its 194,000-acre-foot (239,000,000 m^{3}) capacity and forty-three miles of shoreline, was the principal municipal water source for the city of Dallas for 31 years.

In the 1940s, a need for increased water storage capacity and additional flood control became apparent. The United States Congress passed the Rivers and Harbors Act of 1945, which called for additional construction in the Trinity River basin. The United States Army Corps of Engineers built the Garza-Little Elm Dam between 1948 and 1954 at cost of $23.4 million. The structure combined Lake Dallas, Hickory Creek, and Little Elm Creek. The 32,888-foot (10,024 m) long Lewisville Dam was completed in 1955, and the Garza Dam was breached in 1957 to create the new lake, known then as Garza-Little Elm Reservoir and renamed Lewisville Lake. This new lake had one hundred eighty-three miles of shoreline and a 436,000-acre-foot (538,000,000 m^{3}) capacity. In 1998, additional modifications raised the lake's permanent level from 515 feet (157 m) MSL to 522 feet (159 m) MSL and increased the holding capacity to 555,000 acre-feet (685,000,000 m^{3}).

During construction, members of the Corps of Engineers stumbled upon an archaeological site. In 1956, Wilson W. Crook Jr. and R.K. Harris announced Carbon-14(^{14}C) testing on artifacts from the site, including a Paleo-Indian Clovis projectile point, indicated humans had lived there c. 36,000 BP. This led to much controversy in the archaeological community. It was not until 1978 the water levels would recede enough to access the site again. Between 1978 and 1980, Dennis Stanford of the Smithsonian Institution performed a thorough analysis of the site. He concluded the original dating was due to a rare form of cross-contamination and a date of c. 12,000 B.P. was more correct. Still, the site is considered one of the earliest inhabited by humans in the Southwestern United States and Mexico.

The breaching of the Garza Dam and incorporation of Lake Dallas into the Garza-Little Elm reservoir led to confusion concerning the lake's legal name. This was compounded by the Village of Garza renaming itself Lake Dallas. The federal government attempted to rename the lake as Lewisville Reservoir in 1960, only to reverse itself in 1961. The confusion persisted until the mid-1970s when the lake was officially designated Lewisville Lake. In 1991, the City of Denton (which operates its own municipal power grid) installed a hydropower facility at Lewisville Dam. The single horizontal S-Shaped Kaplan unit can produce 2893 kilowatts, and is connected to the grid via the Brazos River Distribution Authority.

Valentines Day weekend 2021 North Texas and much of the South East United States was hit by a polar vortex plunging temperatures in the DFW area to record lows in nearly 100 years with wind chills in the negative teens. On Tuesday 16 February 2021 large parts of the lake were frozen over. Local measurements taken in Little Elm recorded 2 inches (51 mm) thick ice at 150 feet (46 m) from shore with water depth approximately 11 feet (3.4 m). Closer to shore ice exceeded 5 inches (130 mm). Lewisville Lake had never frozen prior to 2021, since the Garza-Little Elm dam being breached in 1957 to create the current Lewisville Lake.

== Recreation ==
The lake is in the Dallas/Fort Worth Metroplex, so during the summer months, it can become extremely crowded. There are six marinas and three restaurants on the lake. Recreational boating is popular with boat tours and charters available from area businesses. Visitors looking for a more rowdy scene like to visit Party Cove. Centrally located on the lake, near Westlake Park, is the place where boats tie up to one another, listen to music and consume alcoholic beverages. In 2005, at the first large scale bass fishing tournament at Lewisville Lake, Kevin VanDam took home 1st place and a check for $100,000. He also caught, at the time, the lake record bass at 11 pounds 13 ounces (5.4 kg). The Woman's Bassmaster Tour's inaugural event was held in October 2005. The Tour returned in May 2006 and again in April 2008, with angler Kim Bain winning, taking home $51,000 in cash and prizes.

Lewisville Lake Environmental Learning Area (LLELA) is a 2,600 acres (1,100 ha) nature preserve that is adjacent to the lake. It is used for hiking, camping, and other recreational activities.

This lake gains traction from many South Asian communities in and around DFW, including Little Elm Angels Foundation-funded Diwali at the Beach which is an annual event happening at Little Elm Park on the shores of Lewisville Lake. Along with the crowd at Diwali at the Beach, there is another organization, BiJUSA (Bihar-Jharkhand-Uttar Pradesh Society of America) which hosts annual festivals at that location as well.

== Concerns ==
Lake Lewisville's dam has been a recent and occurring issue as it has been "crumbling," narrowly avoiding failure. The dam holds an estimated 180 billion US gallons (0.68 km^{3}) of water, and its aging system, embankment, and support system has struggled to maintain its capacity. The dam has had close calls, such as a sand-boil in 2015, which caused alarm. The U.S. Army Corps of Engineers approved a $150 million repair and upgrade project in 2017. Work to reduce risks of dam failure from seepage was completed in August 2021. Work started in 2021 on a four-year project to upgrade the spillway.

== Transportation ==
Nine bridges cross the lake:

- The main bridge on Interstate 35E crosses the lake on its western finger and is a notorious traffic bottleneck during rush hour. The 35Express project will increase the number of free lanes from 3 to 4 in each direction, and add a managed-toll lane in each direction.
- In parallel with the I-35E bridge is a railroad bridge carrying the DCTA's A-Train.
- Another regularly used bridge is on the lake's eastern finger through Little Elm, connecting two halves of Farm to Market Road 720, locally known as Eldorado Parkway. It carries most of the traffic from communities east of the lake to the Lewisville Lake Toll Bridge.
- US 380 crosses the extreme northern end in two places, each requiring a short bridge. To the west it crosses the Elm Fork, the lake's primary inlet. To the east it crosses the inlet at Pecan Creek.
- The Lewisville Lake Toll Bridge, opened on August 1, 2009, is a NTTA toll bridge connecting Little Elm via Eldorado Parkway and Interstate 35E near Swisher Road. It is to the north of the original Garza Dam.
- Two bridges, part of a northern extension of Farm to Market Road 2499, opened in 2011 and cross the lake's extreme western ends at the Bryant Branch and the Poindexter Branch.
- On the east side of the lake, F.M. 423 crosses the lake via a short bridge at the Stewart's Creek inlet.

Highland Village/Lewisville Lake Station is a commuter rail stop on the DCTA A-train. It connects downtown Denton with DART's Green Line in Carrollton.

== See also ==
- Grapevine Lake
- Trinity River Authority
