= Lake Bridgeport, Texas =

- City
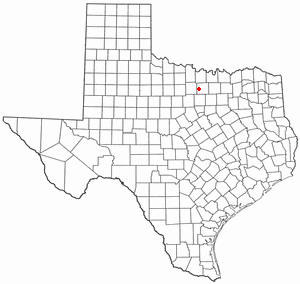
- Location of Lake Bridgeport, Texas

- Coordinates: 33°12′26″N 97°49′52″W
- Country: United States
- State: Texas
- County: Wise

Area
  - Total: 0.47 sq mi (1.21 km^{2})
  - Land: 0.47 sq mi (1.21 km^{2})
  - Water: 0 sq mi (0.00 km^{2})
- Elevation: 899 ft (274 m)

Population (2020)
  - Total: 339
  - Density: 726/sq mi (280/km^{2})
- Time zone: UTC-6 (Central (CST))
  - Summer (DST): UTC-5 (CDT)
- ZIP code: 76426
- Area code: 940
- FIPS code: 48-40450
- GNIS feature ID: 2411599
- Website: cityoflakebridgeport.com

Lake Bridgeport is a city in Wise County, Texas, United States. The population was 339 in 2020.

== Geography ==
According to the United States Census Bureau, the city has a total area of 0.5 square mile (1.2 km^{2}), all land.

== Climate ==
The climate in this area is characterized by hot, humid summers and generally mild to cool winters. According to the Köppen Climate Classification system, Lake Bridgeport has a humid subtropical climate, abbreviated "Cfa" on climate maps.

== Demographics ==
Historical population
Census	Pop.	Note	%±
1980	271		—
1990	322		18.8%
2000	372		15.5%
2010	340		−8.6%
2020	339		−0.3%
U.S. Decennial Census

=== 2020 census ===
As of the 2020 census, Lake Bridgeport had a population of 339, 138 households, and 83 families residing in the city.

The median age was 43.9 years, 17.4% of residents were under the age of 18, and 23.3% of residents were 65 years of age or older; for every 100 females there were 110.6 males, and for every 100 females age 18 and over there were 102.9 males age 18 and over.

0.0% of residents lived in urban areas, while 100.0% lived in rural areas.

There were 138 households in Lake Bridgeport, of which 35.5% had children under the age of 18 living in them; 52.9% were married-couple households, 18.8% were households with a male householder and no spouse or partner present, and 19.6% were households with a female householder and no spouse or partner present. About 21.0% of all households were made up of individuals and 11.5% had someone living alone who was 65 years of age or older.

There were 211 housing units, of which 34.6% were vacant. The homeowner vacancy rate was 1.0% and the rental vacancy rate was 0.0%.

Racial composition as of the 2020 census
Race	Number	Percent
White	294	86.7%
Black or African American	1	0.3%
American Indian and Alaska Native	5	1.5%
Asian	0	0.0%
Native Hawaiian and Other Pacific Islander	0	0.0%
Some other race	10	2.9%
Two or more races	29	8.6%
Hispanic or Latino (of any race)	47	13.9%

== Education ==
The city of Lake Bridgeport is served by the Bridgeport Independent School District.
