= Eagle Mountain Lake =

Reservoir in North Texas, US

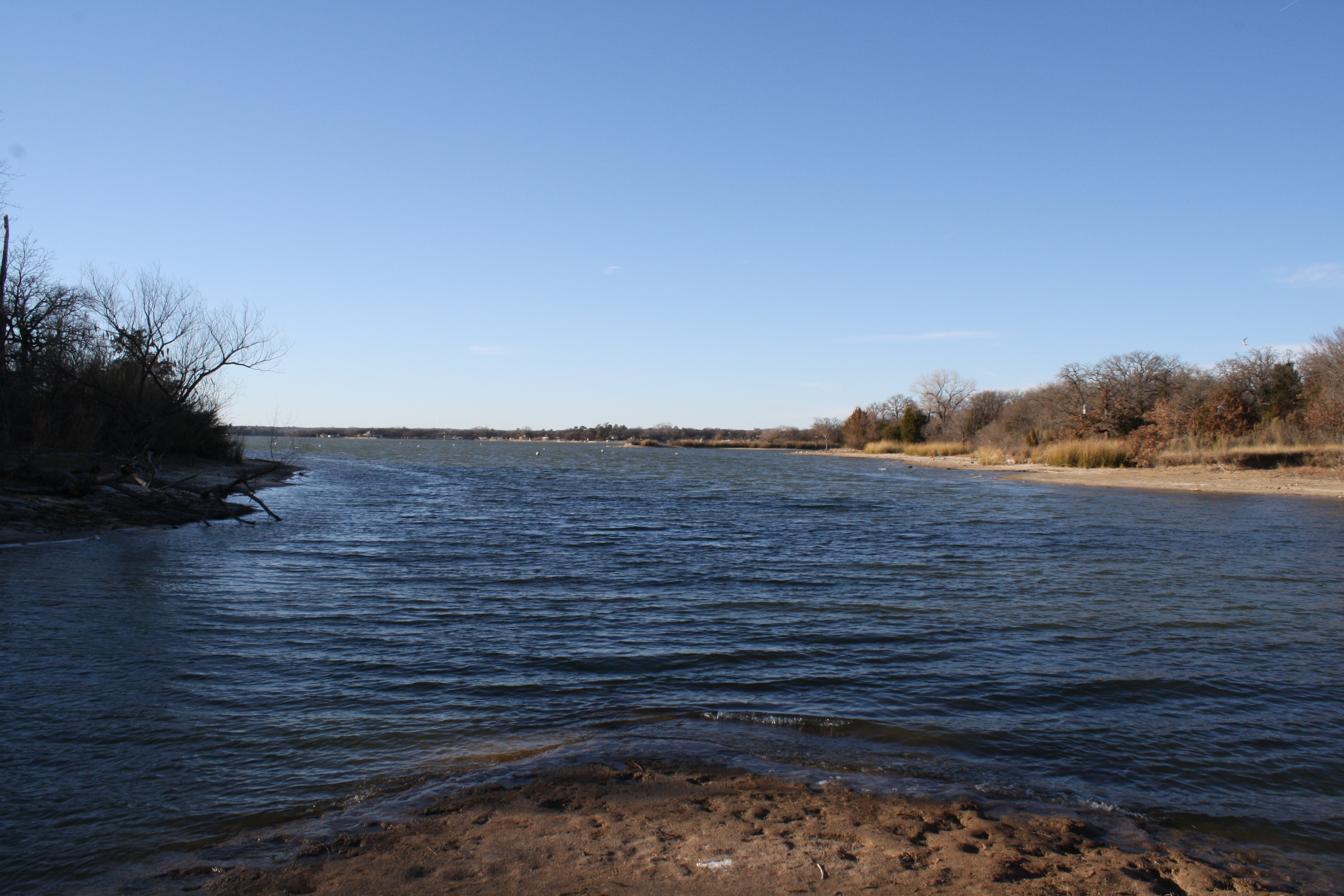

- Location within Texas Location within the United States
- Location: Tarrant / Wise counties, North Texas
- Coordinates: 32°53′55.5″N 97°29′58.4″W
- Primary outflows: Lake Worth (Texas)
- Basin countries: United States
- Surface area: 8,694 acres (3,518 ha)
- Water volume: 179,880 acre⋅ft (221.88 hm^{3})
- Surface elevation: 649 ft (198 m)
- Islands: Pelican Island
- Settlements: Fort Worth, Azle, Pelican Bay, Newark

Eagle Mountain Lake is a reservoir in North Texas, formed by the damming the West Fork of the Trinity River. The reservoir sits below Lake Bridgeport reservoir and above Lake Worth reservoir.

== History ==
The Texas State Board of Water Engineers granted a permit for constructing the dam that would form Eagle Mountain Lake on May 1, 1928. Construction of the dam that formed the reservoir began on January 23, 1930, and was completed on October 24, 1932. Water impoundment began on February 28, 1934. During World War II, the lake's eastern shore was the site of Marine Corps Air Station Eagle Mountain Lake, a military installation built to house the military's glider program. In 1965, the Tarrant Regional Water District voters approved a bond issue to allow the District to install improved controlled spillways. The new spillway was completed July 31, 1971. On May 24, 2011, an EF0 tornado formed over Eagle Mountain Lake, causing damage along west of Boat Club Road downing some trees and damaging mobile homes.

== Recreation ==
Eagle Mountain Lake is used for boating, fishing and water sports such as sailing, wake boarding, water skiing, and kayaking. The reservoir area also has picnic areas, walking trails, campgrounds, and restaurants.

== See also ==
- Tarrant Regional Water District
- Trinity River (Texas)
