= Lake Ray Roberts =

Reservoir in Texas, USA

Ray Roberts Lake
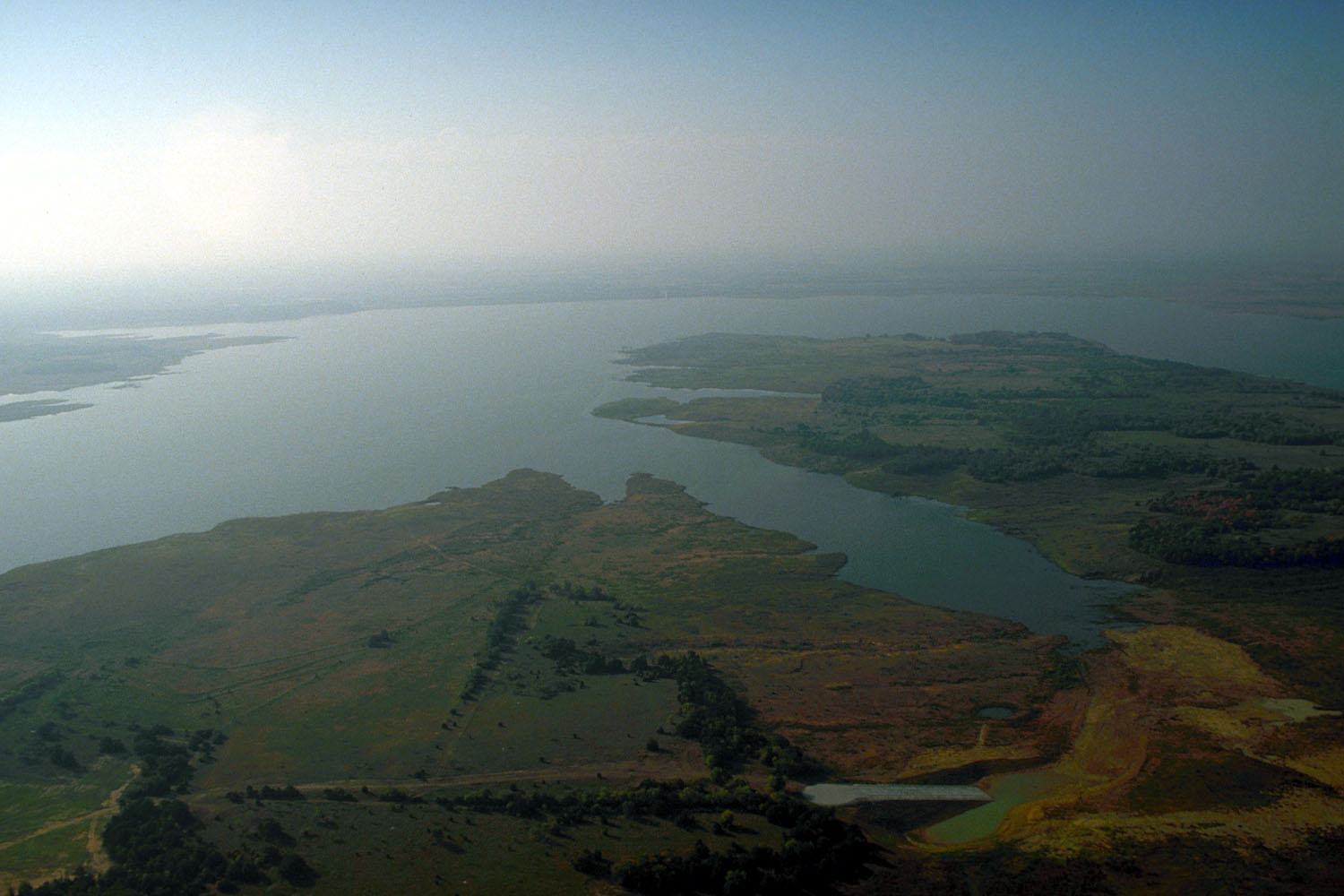
- Aerial view of Ray Roberts

- Location within Texas Location within the United States
- Location: Denton / Cooke / Grayson counties, Texas
- Coordinates: 33°21′53″N 97°03′05″W
- Type: reservoir
- Basin countries: United States
- Surface area: 29,350 acres (119 km^{2})
- Surface elevation: 551 ft (168 m)

Lake Ray Roberts (formally Ray Roberts Lake) is an artificial 29,350-acre (119 km^{2}) American reservoir located 10 miles (20 km) north of Denton, Texas, between the cities of Pilot Point, Texas and Sanger, Texas. It is filled by a tributary of the Trinity River.

It was named after Ray Roberts (a local congressman who supported creation of the lake) in 1980.

The reservoir is located in, and supplies water to, Cooke, Grayson, and Denton counties.

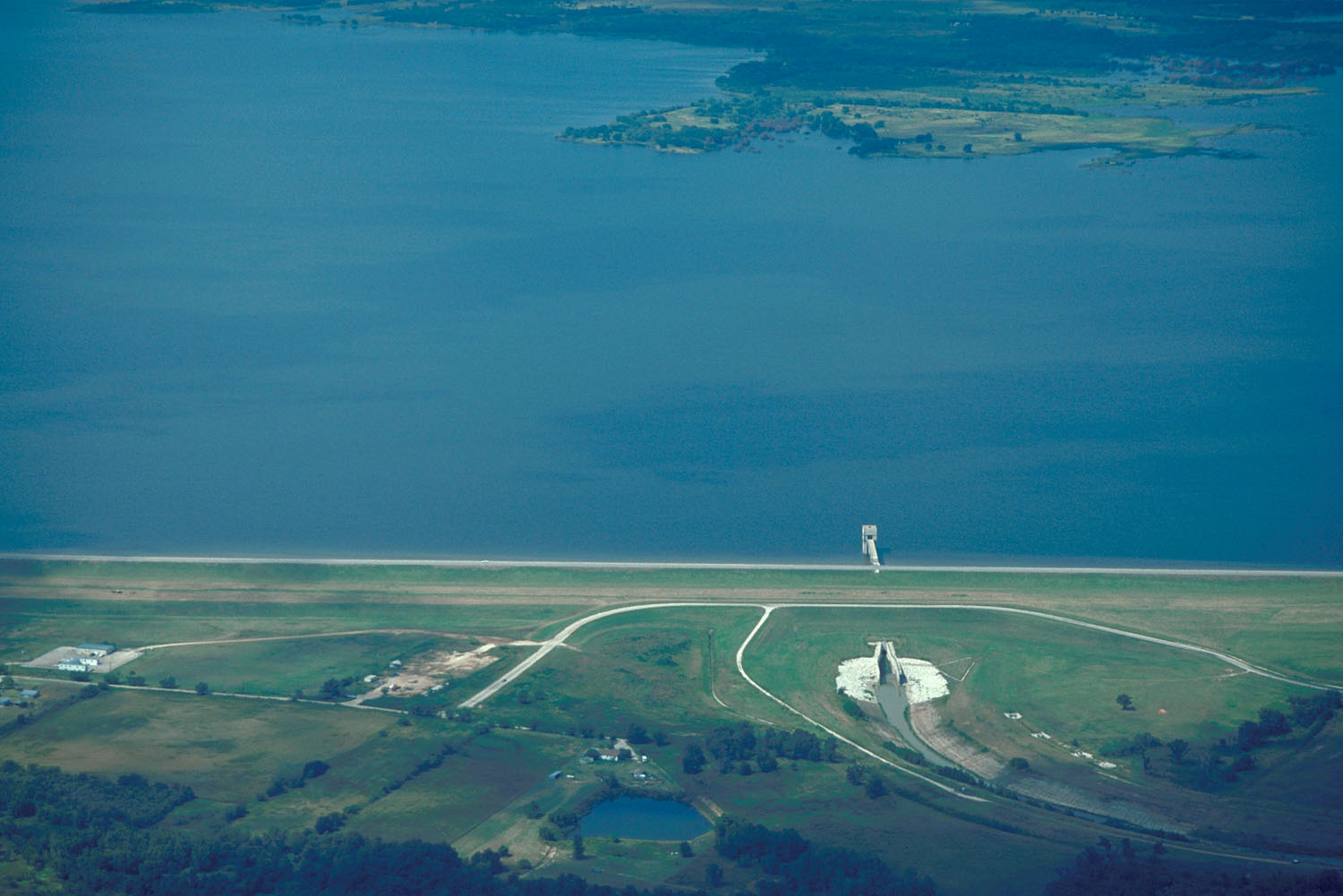
Ray Roberts Dam and Lake

On March 2, 1945, the U.S. Congress approved the River & Harbors Act of 1945 which, among many projects, provided for the construction of Benbrook Lake, Grapevine Lake, Lavon Lake and Ray Roberts Lake, as well as modifications to the existing Garza Dam for the construction of Lewisville Lake. Ray Roberts Dam, an earthen structure 141 feet (43 m) high, is owned and operated by the United States Army Corps of Engineers.

Ray Roberts is also used for recreation and is home to the Ray Roberts Lake State Park.

The construction of Lake Ray Roberts resulted in the dissolution of several communities in the surrounding area. One notable community, which surrounded St. James Baptist Church, was given funds to build a new church in the nearby town of Pilot Point.

== See also ==
- Trinity River Authority
