= Trinity River (Texas) =

River in Texas, United States

Trinity River Río de La Santísima Trinidad Río de La Trinidad
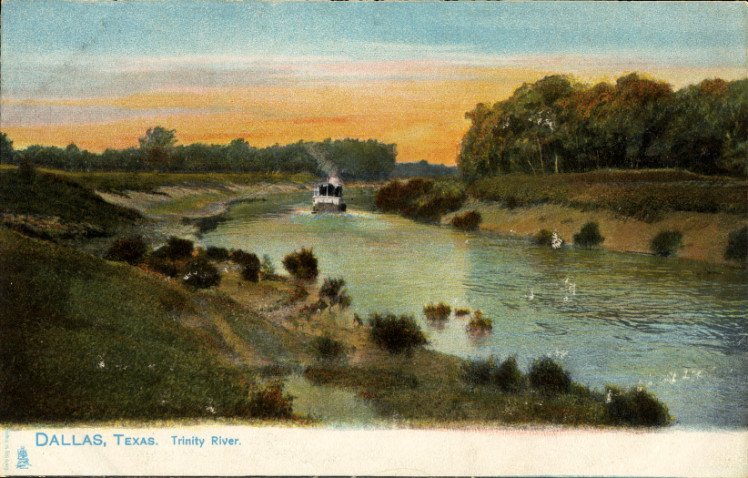
- Trinity River, Dallas, Texas (postcard, c. 1901–1907)

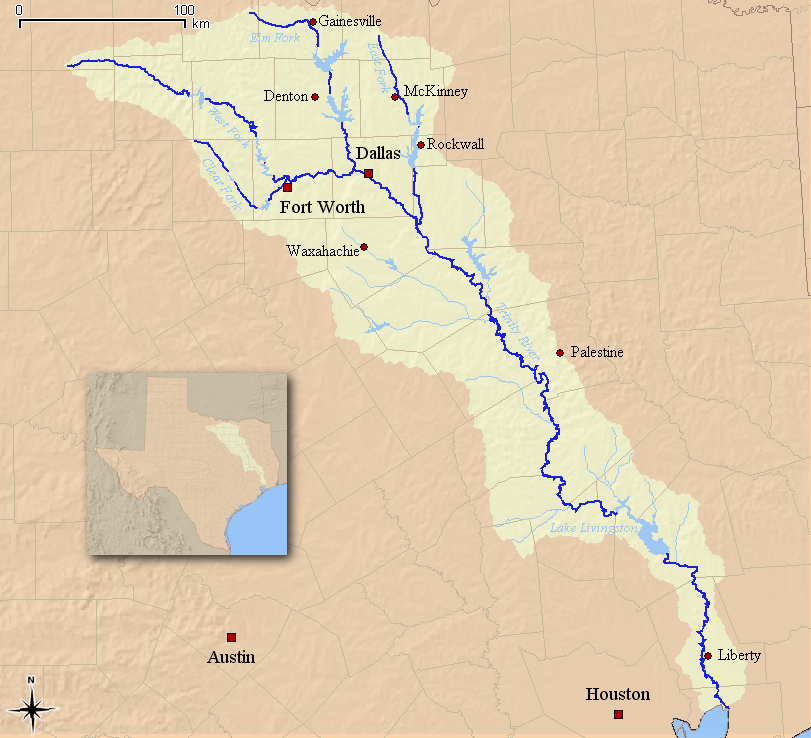

Location
- Country: United States

Physical characteristics
- Source
  - location: North Texas, near the Red River
- Mouth
  - location: Trinity Bay, at Chambers County, Texas
  - coordinates: 29°44′35″N 94°42′12″W
  - elevation: 0 ft (0 m)
- Length: 710 miles (1,140 km)
- Basin size: 15,589 mi^{2} (40,380 km^{2})
- Discharge
  - average: 6,368 cu ft/s (180.3 m^{3}/s)

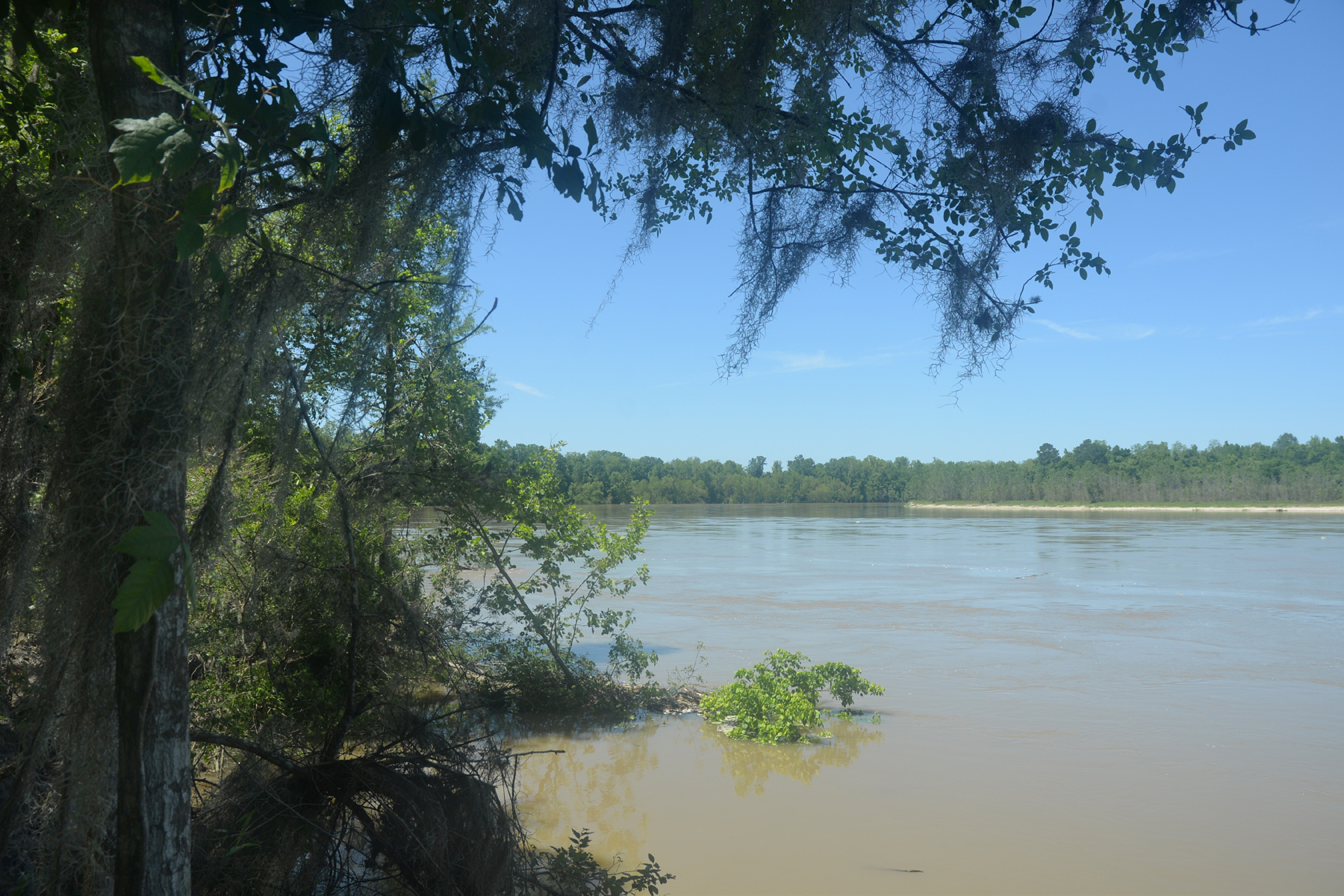
View of the river in the Trinity River National Wildlife Refuge, Liberty County.

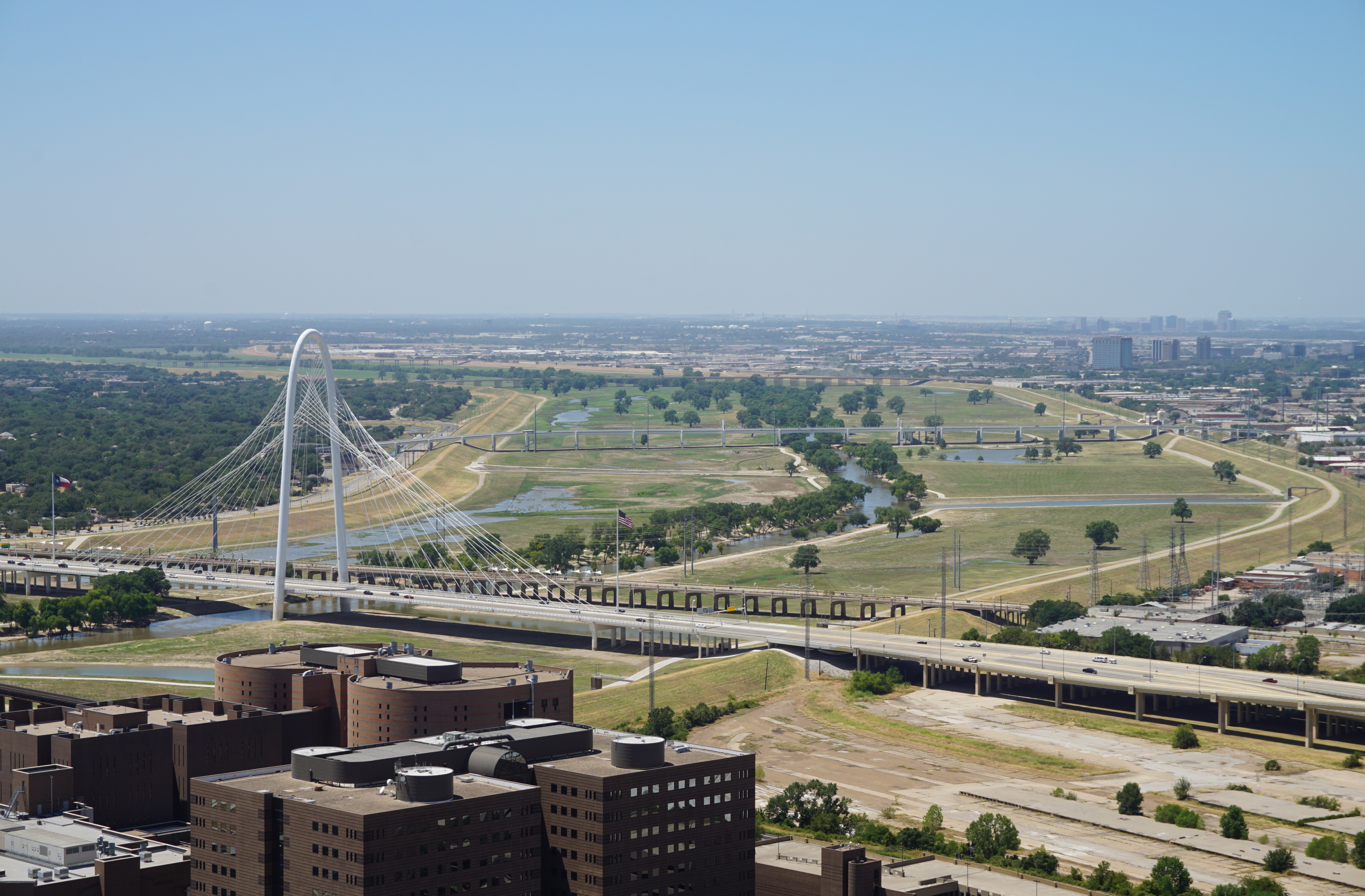
The Trinity River as viewed from Reunion Tower in Dallas in August 2015

The Trinity River is a 710-mile (1,140 km) river. It rises in extreme northern Texas, a few miles south of the Red River. The headwaters are separated by the high bluffs on the southern side of the Red River.

The Trinity River was previously identified as the stream that the Caddo called Arkikosa in Central Texas and Daycoa nearer the coast. However, in 2022, language preservationists from the Caddo Nation determined their ancestral language lacked the letter “R” sound. Arkikosa was likely a corruption or misspelling of the word Akokisa. In the vernacular of another tribe, the Atakapa who settled in the Gulf Coast woodlands, Akokisa means “river people.” French explorer Robert Cavelier de La Salle, in 1687, named the river, Riviere des canoës ("River of Canoes"). In 1690 Spanish explorer Alonso de León named it, "La Santísima Trinidad" ("the Most Holy Trinity").

== Course ==
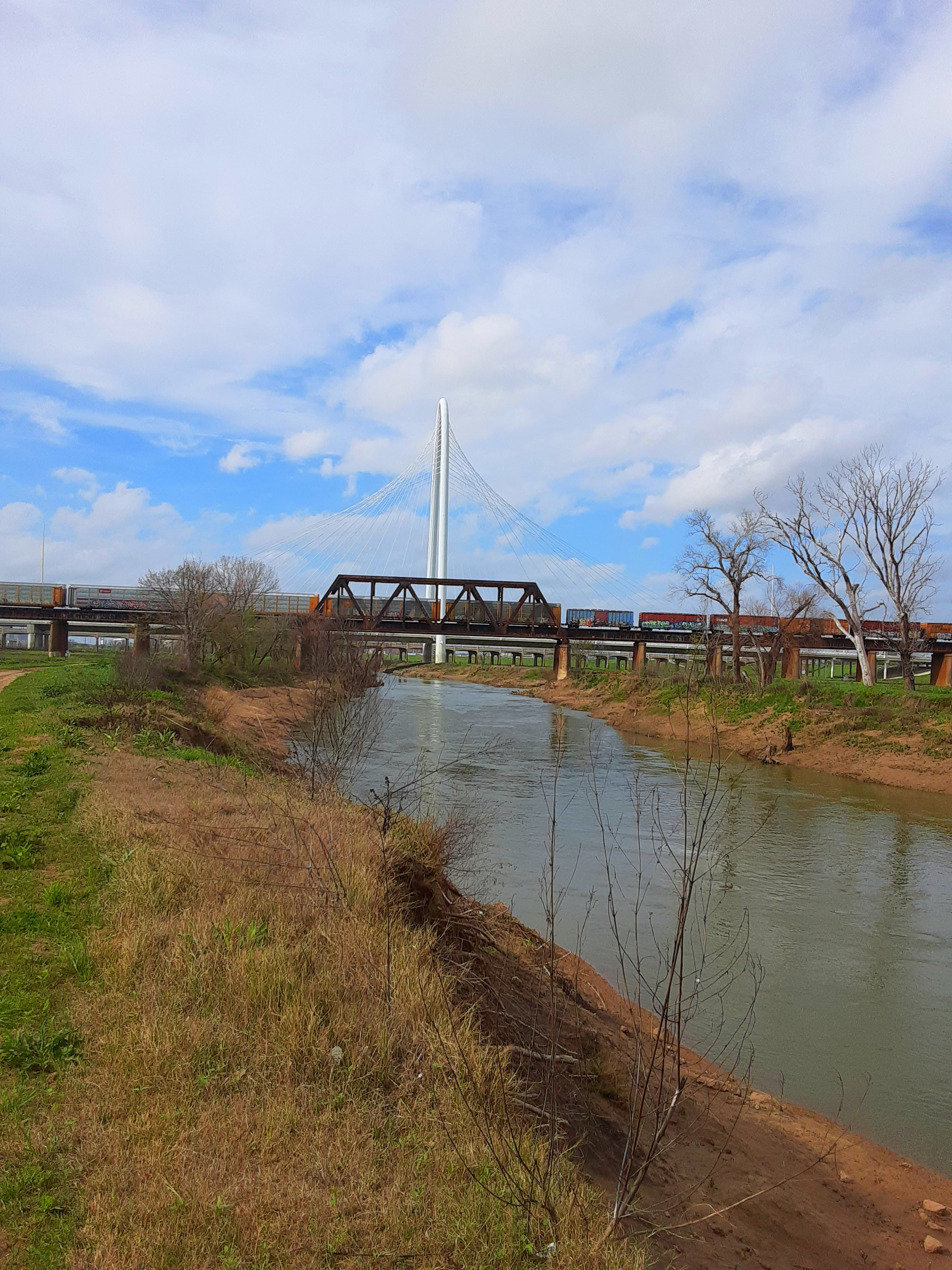
The Trinity River in Dallas, with pedestrian bridge (dark structure in front) and the Margaret Hunt Hill Bridge (tall, light-colored structure behind), as seen in March 2020

The Trinity River has four major tributaries: the West Fork Trinity River, the Clear Fork Trinity River, the Elm Fork Trinity River, and the East Fork Trinity River.

The West Fork Trinity River has its headwaters in Archer County. From there it flows southeast, through the man-made reservoirs Lake Bridgeport and Eagle Mountain Lake, and eastward through Lake Worth and the city of Fort Worth.

The Clear Fork Trinity River begins north of Weatherford, Texas, and flows southeastward through Lake Weatherford and Benbrook Lake reservoirs. It flows northeastward, where it joins the West Fork Trinity River near downtown Fort Worth and continues as the West Fork Trinity River.

The Elm Fork Trinity River flows south from near Gainesville through Ray Roberts Lake and east of the city of Denton, eventually through Lewisville Lake.

The West Fork Trinity River and the Elm Fork Trinity River merge as they enter the city of Dallas and then become the Trinity River.

The East Fork Trinity River (on old maps the Bois d'Arc River) begins near McKinney, Texas, and flows through Lavon Lake and then Lake Ray Hubbard before joining the Trinity River just southeast of Dallas.

The Trinity River flows southeast from Dallas across a fertile floodplain and the pine forests of eastern Texas. The Trinity River crosses Texas State Highway 31 in Henderson County, near where the first county seat, Buffalo, was established. Roughly 65 miles (105 km) north of the mouth on Galveston Bay, an earthen dam was built in 1968 to form Lake Livingston.

The Trinity River empties into Trinity Bay, an arm of Galveston Bay that is an inlet of the Gulf of Mexico. Its river mouth is near the town of Anahuac, southeast of Houston.

=== Tributaries ===
- Clear Fork Trinity River
- East Fork Trinity River (Bois d'Arc River)
- Elm Fork Trinity River
- West Fork Trinity River
- Bachman Branch
- Cedar Creek
- Clear Creek (confluence with Elm Fork in Denton)
- Mountain Creek
- Menard Creek
- Fossil Creek (Texas)
- Johnson Creek
- Red Oak Creek
- Richland Creek
- White Rock Creek
- Rowlett Creek
- Big Creek
- Fourmile Creek
- Five Mile Creek
- Ten Mile Creek
- Sycamore Creek
- Marine Creek

== Public works projects ==
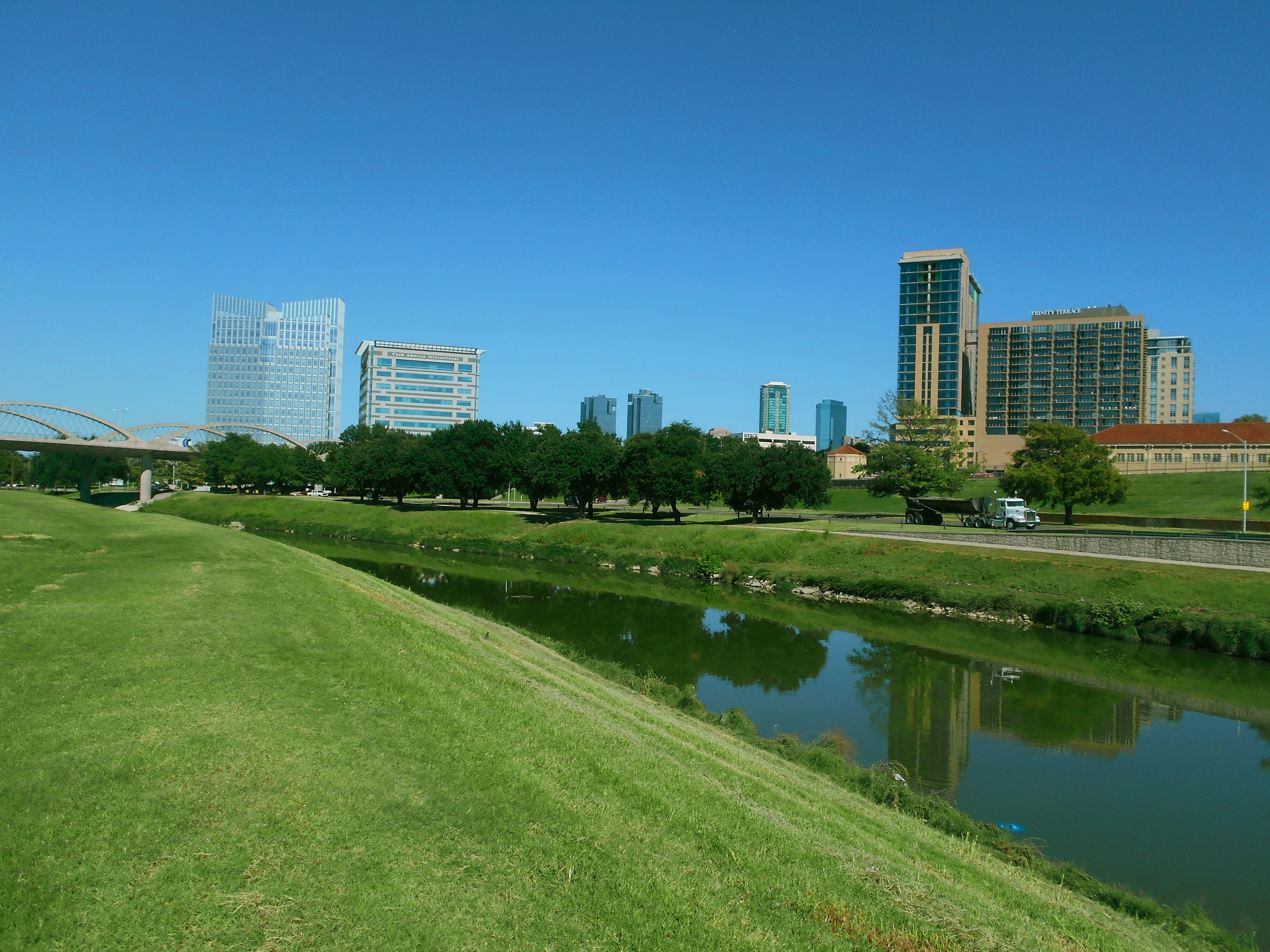
The Trinity River in downtown Fort Worth near West 7th Street.

Plans from the 1890s for a shipping channel along the length of the Trinity River were scrapped because it would have required extensive dredging to make the river navigable, although several overpasses were built with very high clearances in anticipation of the shipping channel. Locks were actually built 13 miles downstream of Dallas in the early 1900s. Original federal plans called for building 36 locks and dams from Trinity Bay near Houston to Dallas. The first built was Lock and Dam No. 1 in the city of Dallas at McCommas Bluff, directly west of Lincoln Memorial Cemetery. Lock construction came to a standstill in the wake of World War I, however. Only Lock and Dam Nos. 1, 2, 4, 6, 7, 20 and 25 were built. There are currently no plans for addressing these old locks located in various spots along the Trinity River. However, the Corps is working nearby on the Dallas Floodway Extension Project. The DFE Project is under construction and is helping to fulfill their mission, as directed by Congress in cooperation with the city of Dallas. It is helping to lower flood risk, and provide ecosystem restoration and recreation to the citizens of Dallas.

The Trinity River Corridor Project is intended to transform the Trinity River flood zone in downtown Dallas into the nation's largest urban park, featuring three signature bridges designed by acclaimed architect Santiago Calatrava.

A similar project is planned by the Tarrant Regional Water District, City of Fort Worth, Tarrant County, Streams & Valleys Inc., and U.S. Army Corps of Engineers to develop an area north of "downtown" as "uptown" along the Trinity River. This plan promotes a large mixed-use development adjacent to the central city area of Fort Worth, with a goal to prevent urban sprawl by promoting the growth of a healthy, vibrant urban core. The Trinity River Vision lays the groundwork to enable Fort Worth's central business district to double in size over the next forty years.

== Floods and flood protection ==
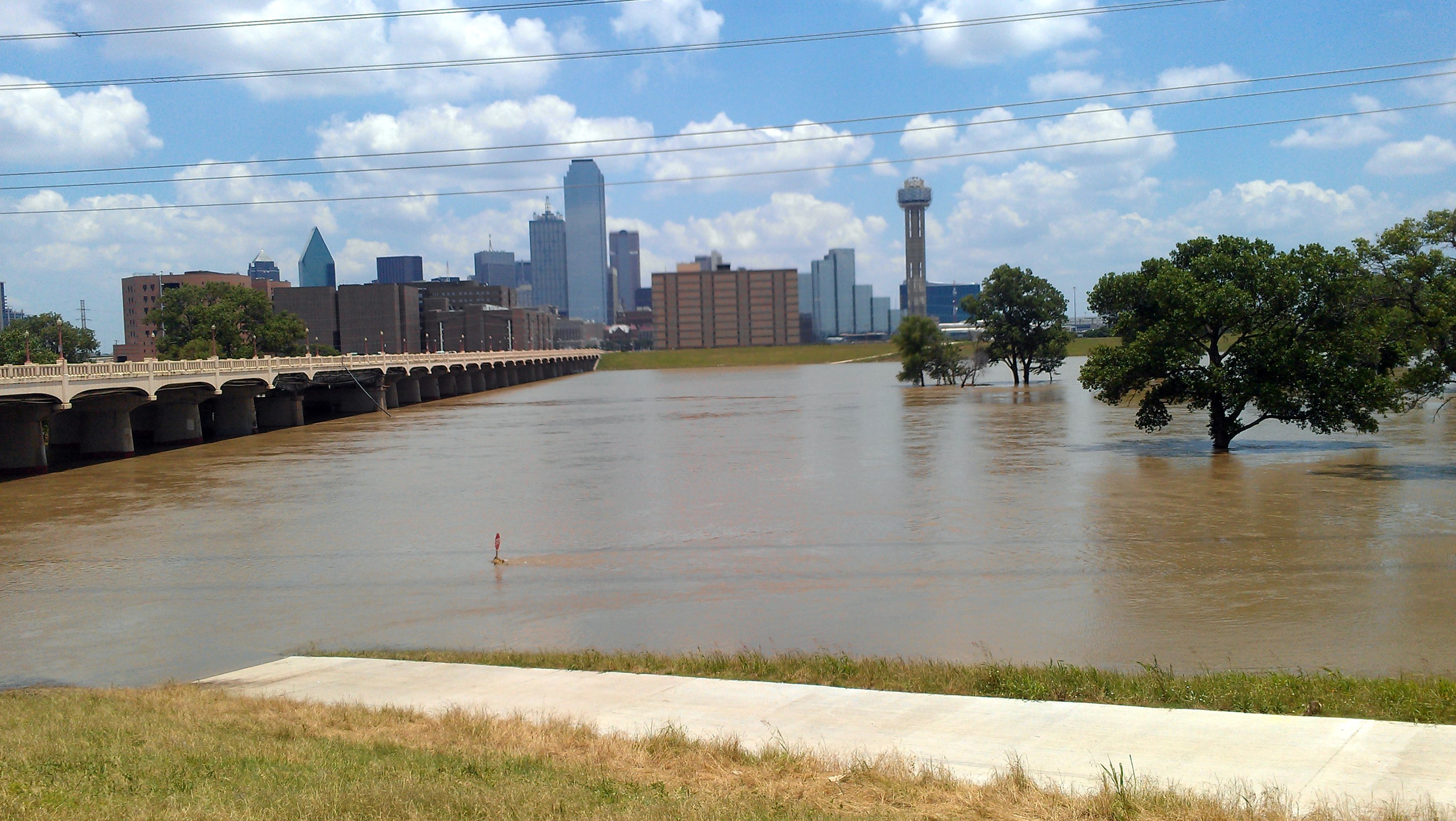
The Trinity River in Dallas flooded up to the levees in June 2015. Seen from the Commerce Street bridge.

Major flooding occurred on the Trinity River in the years 1844, 1866, 1871, and 1890, but a major event in the spring of 1908 set in motion the harnessing of the river. On 26 May 1908, the Trinity River reached a depth of 52.6 feet (16.03 m) and a width of 1.5 miles (2.4 km). Five people died, 4,000 were left homeless, and property damage was estimated at $2.5 million.

Now the wreckage of a shed or outhouse would move by, followed by a drowned swine or other livestock. The construction forces of the Texas & Pacific worked feverishly to safeguard the long trestle carrying their tracks across the stream. Suddenly, this whole structure turned on its side down-stream, broke loose from the rest of the track at one end and swung out into the middle of the current and began breaking up, first into large sections and then into smaller pieces, rushing madly along to some uncertain destination. [Approximately half a dozen of the workmen fell into the torrent at this point; exaggerated reports of their drowning swept the city.]

— C. L. Moss

Dallas was without power for three days, all telephone and telegraph service was down, and rail service was canceled. The only way to reach Oak Cliff was by boat. West Dallas was hit harder than any other part of the city—the Dallas Times Herald said "indescribable suffering" plagued the area. Much to the horror of residents, thousands of livestock drowned in the flood and some became lodged in the tops of trees. The stench of their decay hung over the city as the water subsided.

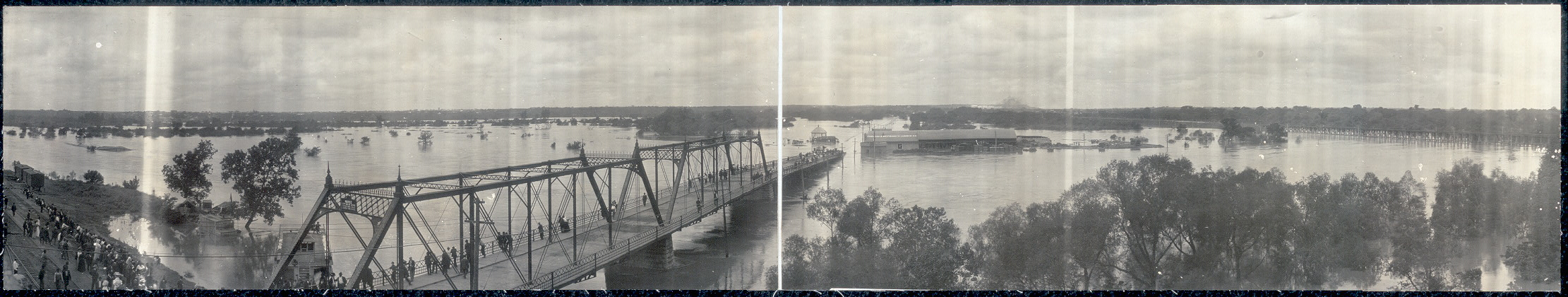
The Trinity River flooding on 8 July 1908.

After the disastrous flood, the city's citizenry wanted to find a way to control the unpredictable Trinity River and to build a bridge linking Oak Cliff and Dallas. The immediate reaction was clamor to build an indestructible, all-weather crossing over the Trinity. This had already been tried following the 1890 flood; the result was the "Long Wooden Bridge" that connected Jefferson Boulevard in Oak Cliff and Cadiz in Dallas, but the resulting unstable bridge was easily washed away by the 1908 flood. George B. Dealey, publisher of the Dallas Morning News, proposed a 1.5-mile (2.4 km) concrete bridge based on the design of a bridge crossing the Missouri River in Kansas City. Ultimately, a US$650,000 (US$21.7 million in today's terms) bond election was approved and in 1912, the Oak Cliff Viaduct (now the Houston Street Viaduct) was opened with festivities that drew 58,000 spectators. At that time, the bridge was the longest concrete structure in the world.

Following from the 1908 flooding, levees were first constructed in 1932. They were heightened in 1960 to the 30 ft that has been maintained to the early 21st century. Current plans to improve the existing levees are part of what is known as the Dallas Floodway Extension project and the Trinity River Project. They entail extending two existing levees and raising two others, all adjacent to the downtown Dallas area.

Downtown Dallas also suffered severe flooding in 1990. Minor flooding of the Trinity River occurs frequently, such as, for instance, in the spring of 2015 and summer of 2022.

== See also ==
- Atakapa
- List of longest rivers of the United States (by main stem)
- List of the ten longest Texas rivers
- List of Texas rivers
- Trinidad, Texas
- Trinity River Authority
- Trinity River National Wildlife Refuge
- Trinity River Vision Project
- Trinity, Texas
