= Wilkerson-Sanders Memorial Stadium =

Multi-use stadium in Rockwall, Texas

Coordinates: 32.916666°N 96.446657°W

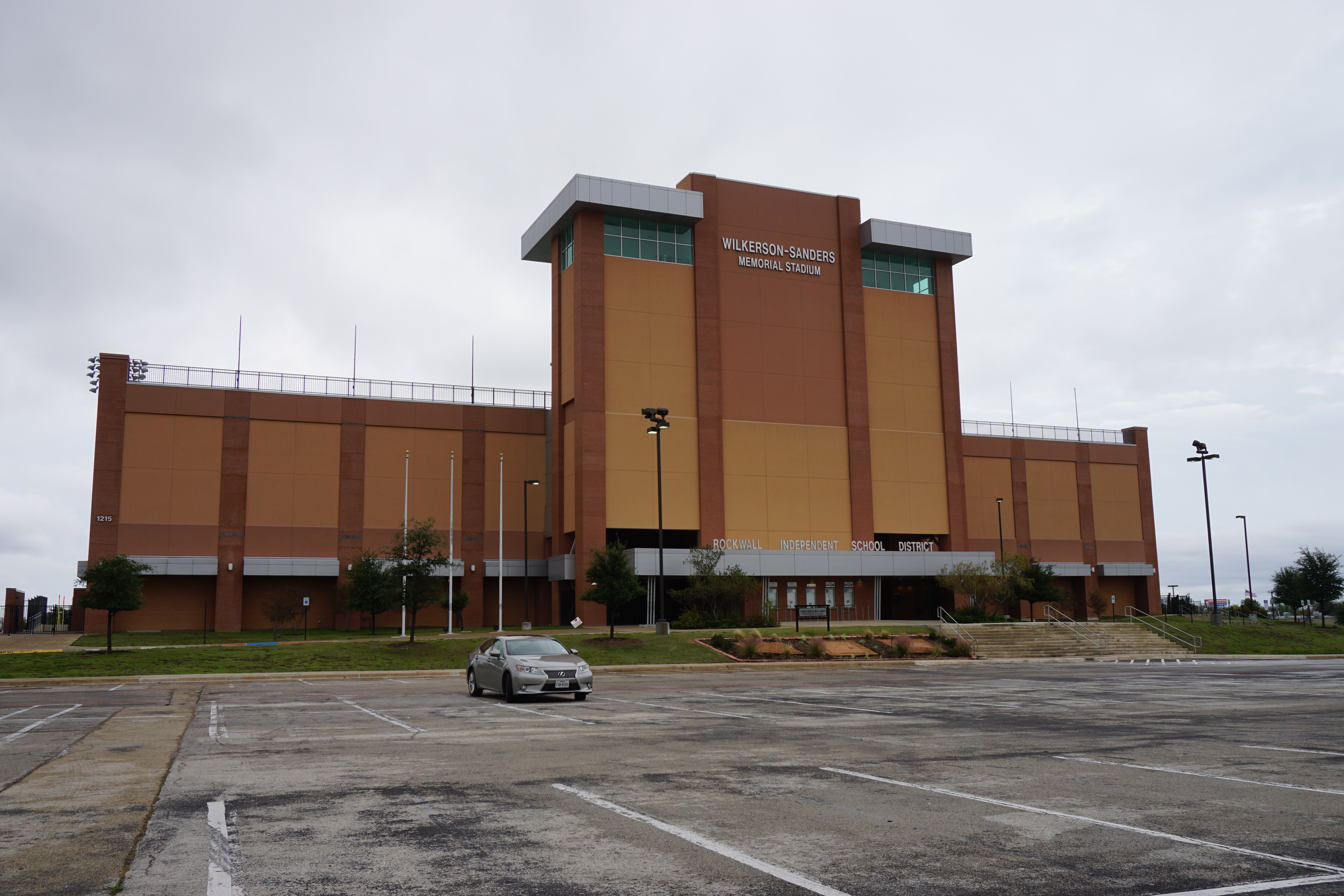
- Interactive map of Wilkerson-Sanders Memorial Stadium
- Full name: Wilkerson-Sanders Memorial Stadium
- Location: Rockwall, TX
- Owner: Rockwall ISD
- Capacity: 8,330

Construction
- Built: 1975
- Opened: 1975

Tenants
- Rockwall HS (1975-); Rockwall-Heath HS (2005-)

Wilkerson-Sanders Memorial Stadium is an 8,330-capacity multi-use stadium located in Rockwall, Texas. The stadium was built by the Rockwall Independent School District in 1975. Used for football, soccer, and track & field it has been home to Rockwall High School since the stadium's opening and Rockwall-Heath High School since 2005. The stadium was remodeled after the 2008 football season and reopened in time for football season to begin in 2009.

Wilkerson-Sanders Memorial Stadium was named in honor of J.A. Wilkerson who was a Math Teacher, Superintendent, and football coach and Harvey Sanders who was a local businessman and strong supporter of the Rockwall Yellowjackets. Wilkerson came to the Rockwall Schools in the late 1920s. He assumed duties as superintendent, math teacher, and football coach in 1934. With his leadership and a strong football tradition additional momentum from the fans became stronger. This led to a new design and construction of a football stadium on the property east of Rockwall High School (presently Hobart Wisdom Stadium) in the 1940s. When the present-day stadium was built, the community and Rockwall Independent School District named the stadium in honor of both Wilkerson and Sanders.
