= Drew VerHagen =

American baseball player (born 1990)

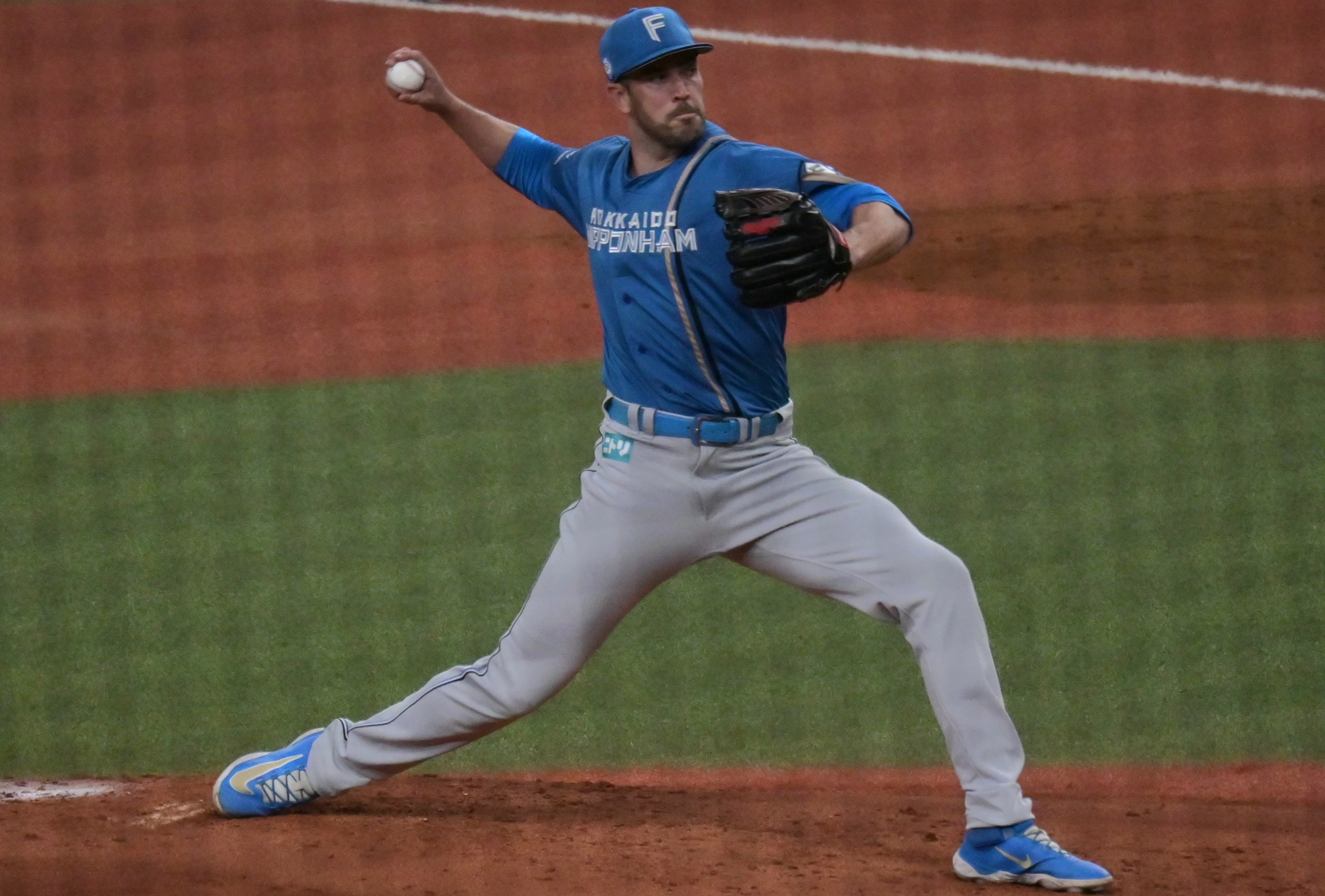
- VerHagen with the Hokkaido-Nippon Ham Fighters

Guerreros de Oaxaca – No. 48
- Pitcher
- Born: October 22, 1990 (age 35); Royse City, Texas, U.S.
- Bats: Right Throws: Right

Professional debut
- MLB: July 19, 2014, for the Detroit Tigers
- NPB: June 25, 2020, for the Hokkaido Nippon-Ham Fighters
- KBO: April 2, 2026, for the NC Dinos

MLB statistics (through 2023 season)
- Win–loss record: 18–12
- Earned run average: 4.98
- Strikeouts: 234

NPB statistics (through 2025 season)
- Win–loss record: 18-19
- Earned run average: 3.68
- Strikeouts: 278

KBO statistics (through 2026 season)
- Win–loss record: 1–1
- Earned run average: 4.68
- Strikeouts: 24
- Stats at Baseball Reference

Teams
- Detroit Tigers (2014–2019); Hokkaido Nippon-Ham Fighters (2020–2021); St. Louis Cardinals (2022–2023); Hokkaido Nippon-Ham Fighters (2024–2025); NC Dinos (2026)

Drew Edward VerHagen (born October 22, 1990) is an American professional baseball pitcher for the Guerreros de Oaxaca of the Mexican League. He has previously played in Major League Baseball (MLB) for the Detroit Tigers and St. Louis Cardinals, in Nippon Professional Baseball (NPB) for the Hokkaido Nippon-Ham Fighters, and in the KBO League for the NC Dinos.

VerHagen played college baseball for the University of Oklahoma and Vanderbilt University. The Tigers selected him in the 2012 MLB draft and he played for them from 2014 to 2019. VerHagen played for the Fighters in NPB from 2020 to 2021 and in MLB for the St. Louis Cardinals from 2022 to 2023. He re-signed with the Fighters for the 2024 season.

== Early life ==
VerHagen attended Rockwall-Heath High School in Heath, Texas, where he was a three-year letter winner. VerHagen did not pitch his senior year due to having Tommy John surgery on his right elbow.

== College career ==
VerHagen began his collegiate career by enrolling at the University of Oklahoma in 2010, where he pitched 13 1/3 innings with a 3.38 earned run average (ERA) for the Oklahoma Sooners. He spent the summer with the Hyannis Harbor Hawks of the Cape Cod League, where he was 0–1 with a 1.66 ERA.

The following year he transferred to Navarro College, where he was a member of the 2011 National Junior College Athletic Association JUCO World Series championship team. VerHagen then transferred to Vanderbilt University, where he made 27 appearances, including seven starts, and went 6–3 with a 3.50 ERA in 69 1/3 innings for the Vanderbilt Commodores in 2012.

== Professional career ==
=== Detroit Tigers ===
The Detroit Tigers chose VerHagen in the fourth round, with the 154th overall selection, of the 2012 MLB draft. After signing with Detroit, VerHagen pitched in the Rookie-level Gulf Coast League for the Gulf Coast League Tigers and for the Lakeland Flying Tigers of the High–A Florida State League. He went 0–3 with a 3.48 ERA in 10 games, including six starts in 2012. In 2013, he split his time between Lakeland and the Erie SeaWolves of the Double–A Eastern League. VerHagen went 7–8 with a 2.90 ERA and a 1.147 WHIP in 24 appearances.

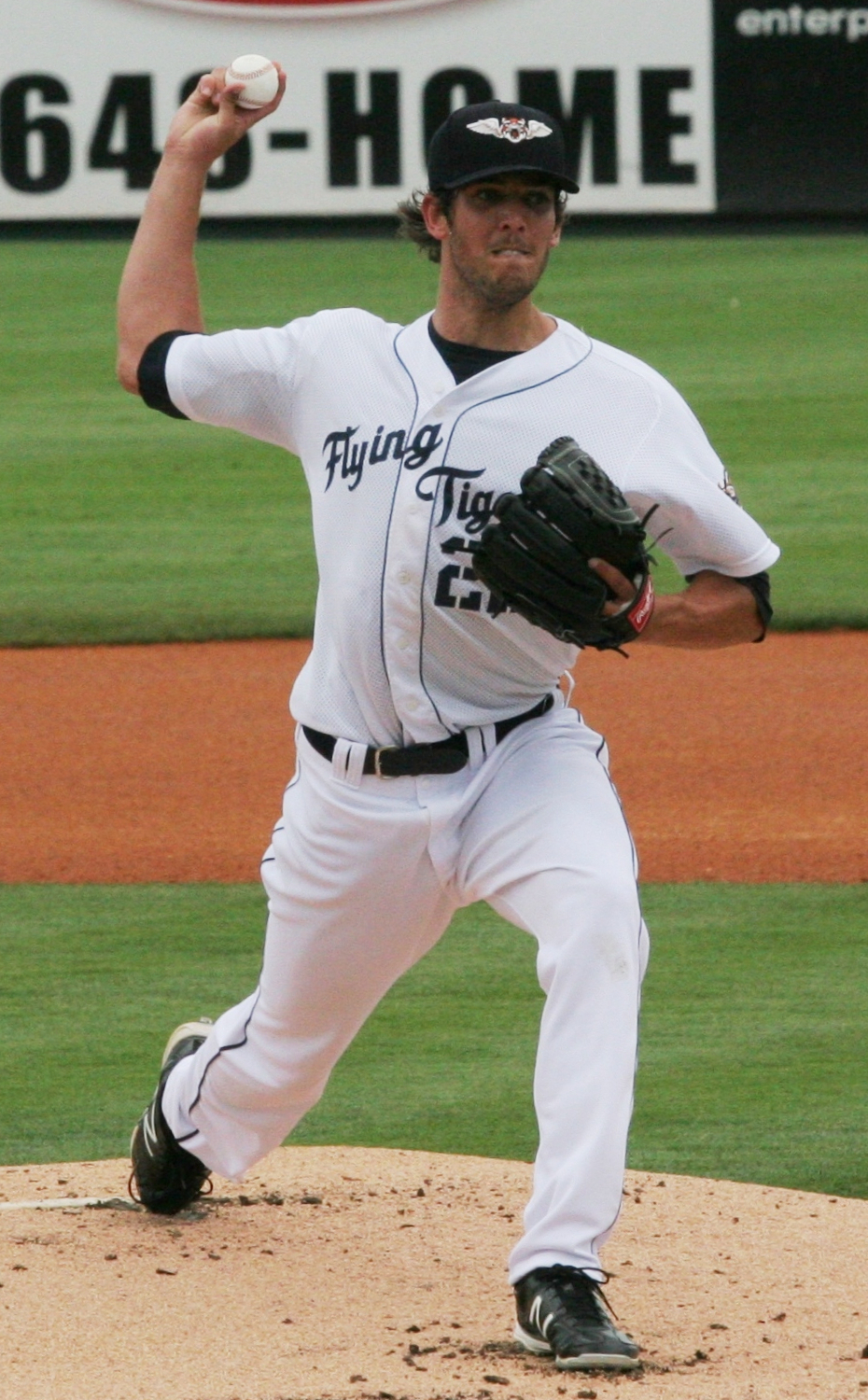
VerHagen pitching for the Lakeland Flying Tigers in 2013

In 2014, Tigers invited VerHagen to spring training. Prior to being called up in 2014, VerHagen was 6–7, with a 3.67 ERA and 63 strikeouts in 19 starts for the Triple–A Toledo Mud Hens. VerHagen made his major league debut for the Detroit Tigers on July 19, 2014, in a game against the Cleveland Indians. VerHagen allowed five hits and three earned runs in five innings while walking three and striking out four. He was optioned back to Triple-A Toledo the next day.

In 2015, VerHagen was converted into a reliever, making 20 appearances out of the bullpen between Double–A Erie and Triple–A Toledo. He made one appearance with the Tigers on July 5, and was optioned back to Toledo. He returned to the Tigers for an August 19 appearance against the Chicago Cubs and remained with the parent club the rest of the season. VerHagen recorded his first career major league win, in a 9–2 decision over the Cleveland Indians in the second game of a doubleheader on September 13, 2015. He pitched two scoreless innings, allowing zero hits and two walks. For the 2015 season, he would pitch a total of 26 1/3 innings with the Tigers, surrendering only 18 hits while striking out 13 and posting a 2.05 ERA.

In 2016, VerHagen made the Tigers' opening-day roster. On May 22, 2016, he was optioned to Triple–A Toledo after compiling a 7.11 ERA in 19 innings pitched. A day later, the Tigers placed him on the 60-day disabled list due to right shoulder thoracic outlet syndrome.

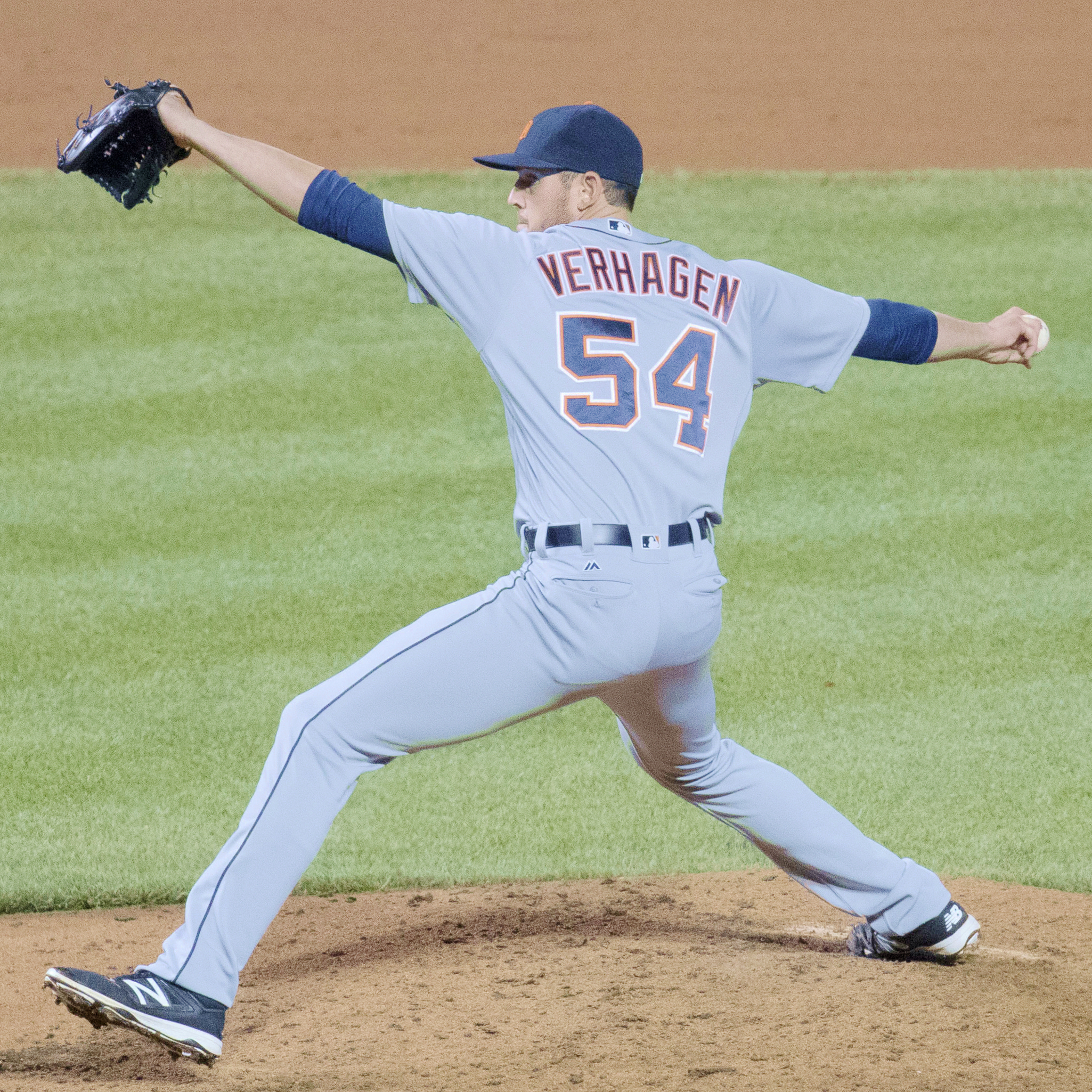
VerHagen with the Tigers in 2016

In 2017, the Tigers optioned VerHagen to Triple–A Toledo to start the 2017 season. He was recalled on July 24. He made 24 appearances (two starts) in the 2017 season, compiling a 5.77 ERA with 25 strikeouts in 34 1/3 innings.

In spring training 2018, manager Ron Gardenhire and VerHagen discussed a full-time bullpen role for the upcoming season. VerHagen made the Tigers opening day roster, and was placed in the bullpen. On April 23, he was designated for assignment after posting a 6.30 ERA in 10 innings. The Tigers announced that they would purchase VerHagen's contract so he could start the first game of a doubleheader on June 4. He posted a 4.27 ERA the rest of the season, contributing to a final line of 3–3, 4.63 ERA, and 53 strikeouts in 56 1/3 innings.

In 2019, VerHagen was designated for a rehab assignment with the Single–A Lakeland Flying Tigers to start the 2019 season, due to a sore shoulder. He was recalled to the Tigers on April 7, following an injury to starter Matt Moore. The Tigers designated VerHagen for assignment on May 4 after he gave up six runs in a 15–3 loss. He cleared waivers and was sent outright to Toledo on May 11. On July 25, the Tigers selected VerHagen's contract, adding him back to their active roster. On August 23, VerHagen struck out a career-high 11 batters in a win over the Minnesota Twins. He finished the season with a record of 4–3 in 22 games (four starts), with a 5.90 ERA and 51 strikeouts in 58 innings pitched. VerHagen was released by the Tigers organization on November 25.

=== Hokkaido Nippon-Ham Fighters ===
On November 26, 2019, VerHagen signed a one-year contract with the Hokkaido Nippon-Ham Fighters of Nippon Professional Baseball (NPB). He signed a one-year extension with the team on November 22, 2020. He became a free agent following the 2021 season.

=== St. Louis Cardinals ===
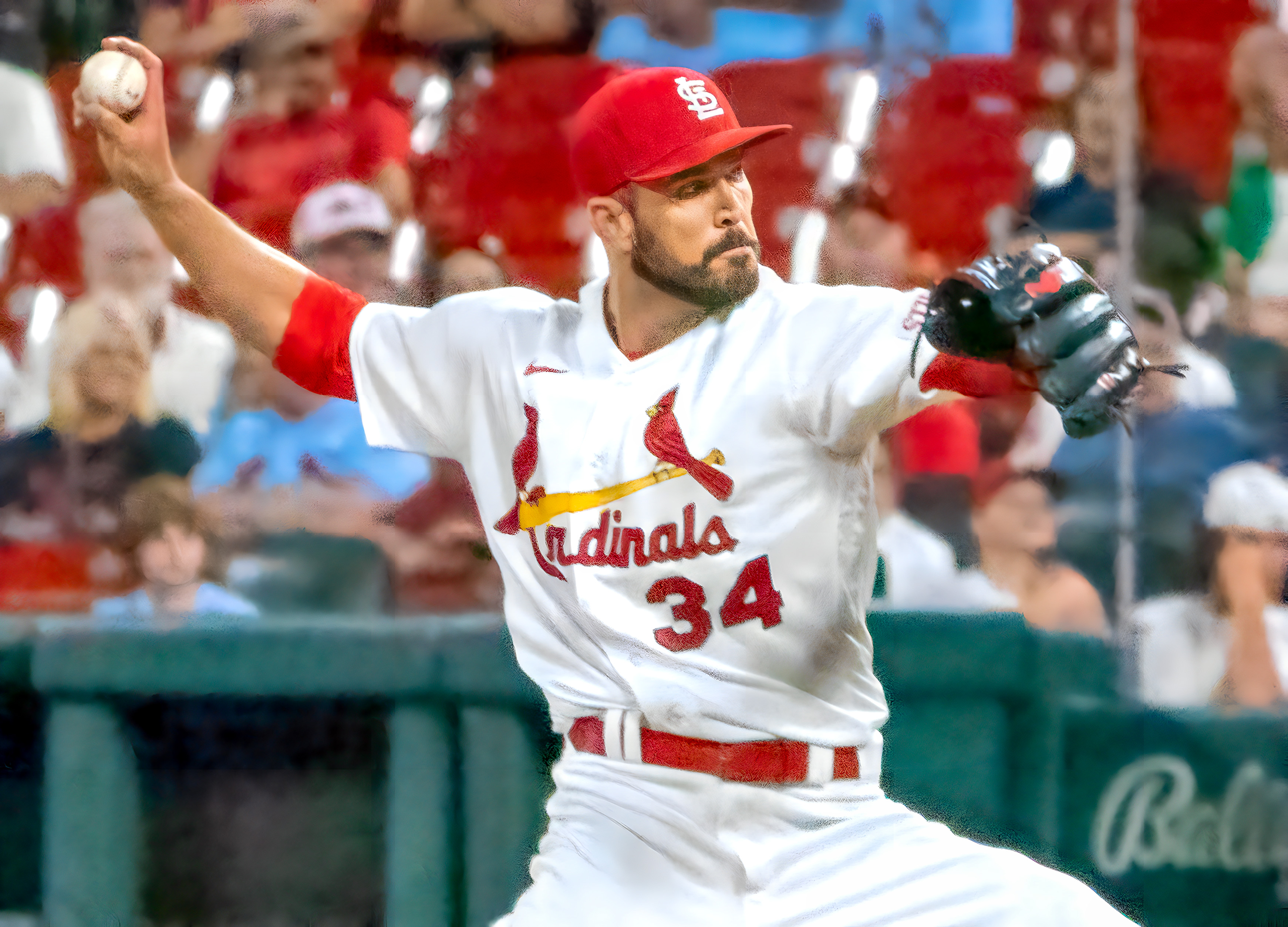
VerHagen Hurls for St. Louis, 2023.

On March 11, 2022, VerHagen agreed to a two-year contract worth $5.5 million with the St. Louis Cardinals. He made 19 appearances for the Cardinals during an injury-plagued season, registering a 6.65 ERA and 1.89 WHIP in 21 2/3 innings pitched. On August 4, he underwent season-ending surgery on his hip.

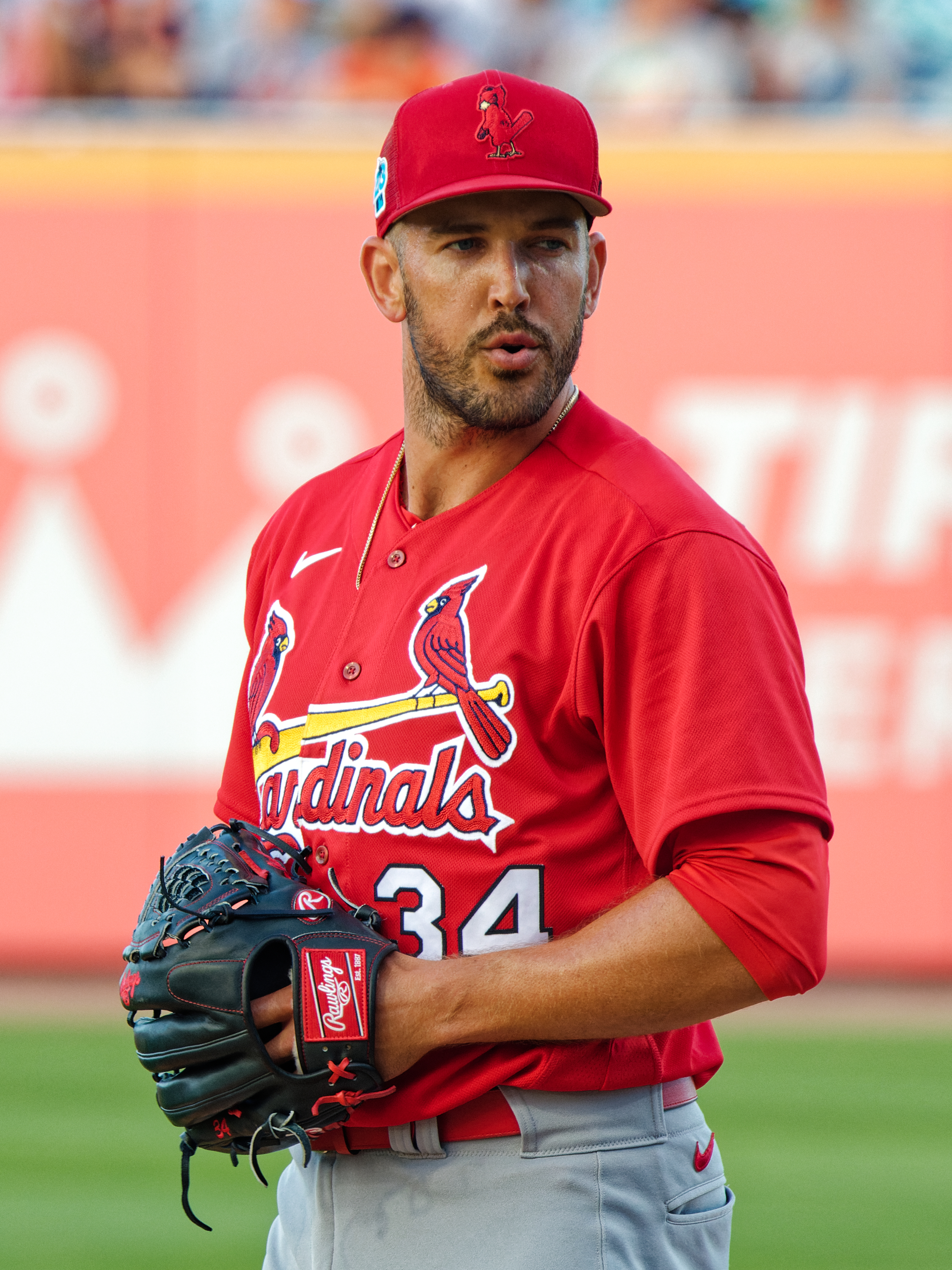
VerHagen with the St. Louis Cardinals

VerHagen made 60 appearances out of the bullpen for St. Louis in 2023, compiling a 5-1 record and 3.98 ERA with 60 strikeouts across 61 innings of work. He became a free agent following the 2023 season.

=== Hokkaido Nippon-Ham Fighters (second stint) ===
On January 12, 2024, VerHagen re-signed a contract with the Hokkaido Nippon-Ham Fighters of Nippon Professional Baseball. In 9 appearances for the main team, he posted a 2–2 record and 3.12 ERA with 41 strikeouts across 49 innings of work.

On December 25, 2024, VerHagen re–signed with the Fighters on a one–year contract. He made six appearances for the team in 2025, posting a 3-3 record and 6.08 ERA with 22 strikeouts across 26 2/3 innings pitched. VerHagen became a free agent following the season.

=== NC Dinos ===
On December 6, 2025, VerHagen signed a one-year, $800,000 contract with the SSG Landers of the KBO League. On January 19, 2026, the Landers announced that they would be opting out of their agreement with VerHagen due to an issue in his physical.

On March 28, 2026, VerHagen signed a six-week, $70,000 contract with the NC Dinos of the KBO League as an injury replacement for Riley Thompson. He made six starts for the Dinos, accumulating a 1-1 record and 4.68 ERA with 24 strikeouts over 25 innings of work. On May 5, VerHagen's contract with the team expired.

=== Long Island Ducks ===
On July 17, 2026, VerHagen signed with the Long Island Ducks of the Atlantic League of Professional Baseball. In three starts for Long Island, he posted a 1–0 record with a 1.59 ERA and 12 strikeouts in 11 1/3 innings pitched.

=== Guerreros de Oaxaca ===
On August 4, 2026, VerHagen's contract was purchased by the Guerreros de Oaxaca of the Mexican League.

== Pitch selection ==
VerHagen throws two primary pitches: a fastball in the 93–96 miles per hour (150–154 km/h) range, topping out at 98 miles per hour (158 km/h), and an upper-70s curveball. He throws his fastball as both a four-seam fastball and a two-seam fastball. He mixes in an occasional changeup at 82–86 miles per hour (132–138 km/h).
