= Justin Holland (politician) =

American politician (born 1984)

Justin Aldred Holland

Member of the Texas House of Representatives from the 33rd district
- In office January 10, 2017 – January 14, 2025
- Preceded by: Scott Turner
- Succeeded by: Katrina Pierson

Personal details
- Born: March 15, 1984 (age 42) Dallas, Texas, U.S.
- Party: Republican
- Spouse: Neely Hicks (m. 2008)
- Children: 2
- Education: Texas Tech University (BA); Texas A&M University–Commerce (MS)
- Occupation: Real estate agent
- Website: www.justinholland.org

Justin Aldred Holland (born March 15, 1984) is an American real estate broker from Heath, Texas, who was a Republican member of the Texas House of Representatives for the 33rd District, which included Rockwall County and a portion of Collin County. He won the general election held on November 8, 2016, and was sworn into office on January 10, 2017. He was defeated by Katrina Pierson by 56% to 44% on May 28, 2024, in the Republican primary runoff.

== Political career ==
Prior to his tenure in the Texas House which began in 2016, Holland served five years on the Heath City Council, including two years as Mayor Pro Tem.

In the 85th Texas Legislature, Holland was appointed to the House committees on Homeland Security & Public Safety and Investments & Financial Services.

In the general election held on November 6, 2018, Holland won reelection to his second term, 53,761 votes (65 percent), to 28,885 (35 percent) for Democrat Laura Gunn. Thereafter, in the 86th Texas Legislature, Holland was appointed to the House committees on Culture, Recreation & Tourism and State Affairs.

In the general election held on November 3, 2020, Holland won reelection to his third term, 77,504 (65 percent), to 41,827 (35 percent) for Democrat Andy Rose. Thereafter, in the 87th Texas Legislature, Holland was appointed as Vice Chair to the House Committee on Urban Affairs, the House Appropriations Committee, and the House Appropriations Subcommittee on Articles I, IV, & V. He is currently the Vice Chair of the Texas Sunset Advisory Commission and is serving a term to expire in 2025. The Commission has five Senators, five Representatives, and two members of the public, appointed by the Lieutenant Governor and the Speaker of the House. The position of chair rotates between the House and the Senate every two years.

In the primary election held on March 1, 2022, Holland won his party's nomination for the fourth consecutive time with 6,402 votes (69.9 percent), to his two opponents who collectively garnered 2,326 votes (25.4 percent) and 429 votes (4.7 percent) respectively. He faced Democratic nominee Graeson Lynskey in November 2022, winning re-election.

In May 2023, Holland was one of two Republicans on the House Committee on Community Safety for the 88th Legislature (along with Sam Harless), who voted to advance HB 2744 to the full House chamber. The bill, which was championed by relatives of those killed in the 2022 Robb Elementary School shooting in Uvalde, Texas, sought to raise the age to purchase certain semi-automatic weapons from 18 to 21. Holland's vote came just two days after eight people were killed in the 2023 shooting at an outlet mall in Allen, Texas.

== Personal life ==
A sixth-generation Rockwall native, Holland graduated from Rockwall High School and Texas Tech University in Lubbock and then obtained a Master of Science degree from Texas A&M University–Commerce in Commerce, Texas.

He is a member of Rockwall Rotary International, a 2014 graduate of Leadership Rockwall, former vice president of the Heath Economic Development and Municipal Benefits Corporations, an endowed member of East Trinity Lodge #157, a member of the Rockwall Republican Men's Club, a former member of the City of Heath Special Events Board, a volunteer for Rockwall County Relay for Life, past director of the Rockwall Independent School District Education Foundation, and a volunteer for Rockwall County Helping Hands. Holland is a 32° Scottish Rite Mason and is a noble of the Hella Shrine in Garland, Texas; both being affiliated bodies of Freemasonry.

Justin and his wife Neely have been married since 2008 and have two daughters. The Hollands are members of Lake Pointe Church, a large Southern Baptist congregation in Rockwall, Texas.

Texas House of Representatives
Preceded by Scott Turner	Texas State Representative for District 33 (Rockwall and Collin counties); 2017–2025	Succeeded by Katrina Pierson
