= Solomon Ortiz Jr. =

American politician

Member of the Texas House of Representatives from the 33rd district
- In office November 25, 2006 – January 11, 2011
- Preceded by: Vilma Luna
- Succeeded by: Raul Torres

Personal details
- Born: July 21, 1977 (age 49) Corpus Christi, Texas, U.S.
- Party: Democratic
- Education: Texas A&M University
- Website: solomonortizjr.com

Solomon Ortiz Jr. (born July 21, 1977) is a Democratic former member of the Texas House of Representatives, serving from 2006 to 2011.

Ortiz is the son of former Congressman Solomon Ortiz, who represented a South Texas district for 28 years before being defeated by Republican Blake Farenthold in 2010. Ortiz Jr. considered challenging Farenthold in 2014. Ortiz currently is Executive Director for the MAP of Texas, a non-profit founded by him and his father. Solomon is also a Partner in Ortiz Holdings, a business development firm based in Texas, and has previously worked as a public school teacher and for the Fighting to Rid Gangs in America Foundation.

Ortiz was elected in 2006, succeeding fellow Democrat Vilma Luna. Ortiz was unseated in 2010 by Raul Torres, a businessman who Ortiz had defeated in 2008. Ortiz announced a comeback bid for the 2012 elections, but ultimately did not run.
