= Kevin Bazzell =

American baseball player (born 2003)

Washington Nationals
- Catcher
- Born: March 29, 2003 (age 23); Dallas, Texas, U.S.
- Bats: Right Throws: Right
- Stats at Baseball Reference

Kevin Chet Bazzell (born March 29, 2003) is an American professional baseball catcher in the Washington Nationals organization. He was drafted by the Nationals in the 3rd round of the 2024 MLB draft.

== Amateur career ==
Bazzell grew up in Rockwall, Texas and attended Rockwall-Heath High School. He was named the area Offensive Player of the Year by The Dallas Morning News as a senior after he batted .438 with five home runs and 36 RBI.

Bazzell enrolled at Dallas Baptist University and took part in the Patriots' fall practices before deciding to transfer to Texas Tech University at the end of his first semester at the school. He was forced to sit out his true freshman season due to NCAA rules and used a redshirt. As a redshirt freshman, he served as the Red Raiders' starting third baseman and was named a freshman All-American by Baseball America after hitting .348 with 24 doubles, 10 home runs, and 62 RBI. In 2023, he played collegiate summer baseball with the Falmouth Commodores of the Cape Cod Baseball League. Before the start of his redshirt sophomore season moved from third base to catcher, after the previous starting catcher Hudson White transferred to Arkansas.

== Professional career ==
Bazzell was drafted by the Washington Nationals in the 3rd round, with the 79th overall selection, of the 2024 Major League Baseball draft. On July 19, 2024, Bazzell signed with the Nationals on a $980,000 contract.
