= F46 =

F46 may refer to:

- F46 (classification), a disabled sports handicap class for arm amputees
- BMW 2 Series Gran Tourer, an automobile
- Brazilian frigate Greenhalgh (F46), a Type 22 frigate of the Brazilian Navy
- Fairchild F-46, an American aircraft
- HMS Juno (F46), a J-class destroyer of the Royal Navy
- INS Tarkash (F46), a Talwar-class frigate of the Indian Navy
- Ralph M. Hall/Rockwall Municipal Airport, in Rockwall, Texas, United States
