= Scott Turner (politician) =

American politician and former football player (born 1972)

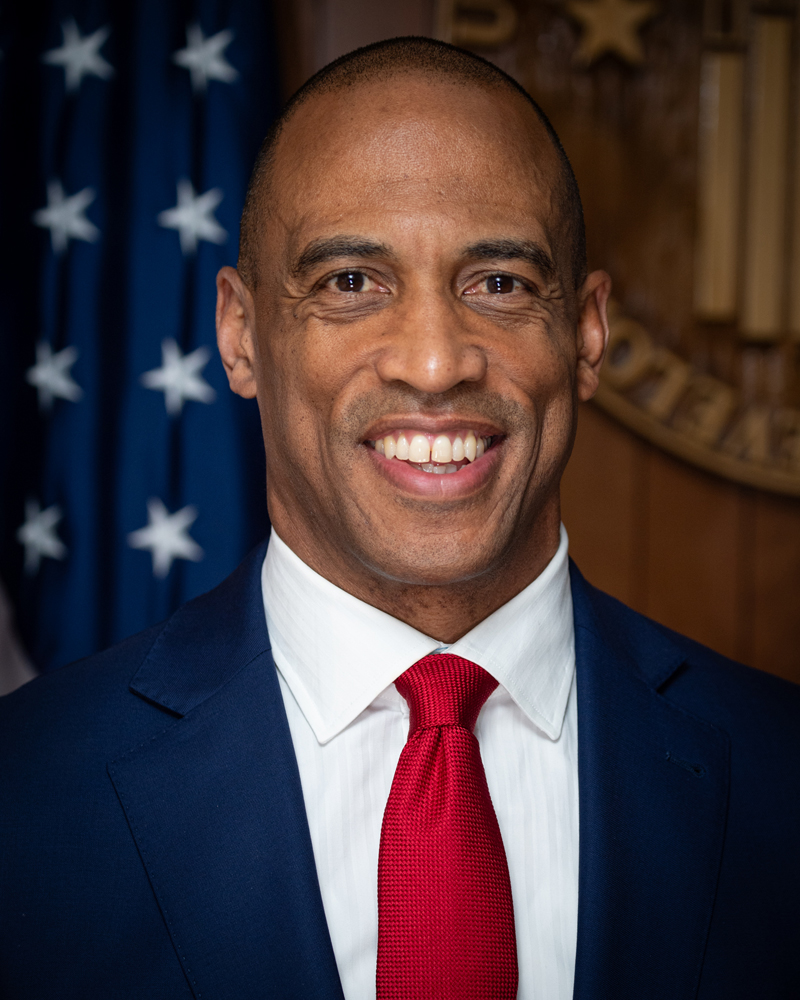
- Official portrait, 2025

19th United States Secretary of Housing and Urban Development
- Incumbent
- Assumed office February 5, 2025
- President: Donald Trump
- Deputy: Andrew D. Hughes
- Preceded by: Marcia Fudge

Executive Director of the White House Opportunity and Revitalization Council
- In office April 4, 2019 – January 20, 2021
- President: Donald Trump
- Preceded by: Position established
- Succeeded by: Position abolished

Member of the Texas House of Representatives from the 33rd district
- In office January 8, 2013 – January 9, 2017
- Preceded by: Raul Torres
- Succeeded by: Justin Holland

Personal details
- Born: Eric Scott Turner; February 26, 1972 (age 54) Richardson, Texas, U.S.
- Party: Republican
- Spouse: Robin Turner (m. 1995)
- Education: University of Illinois, Urbana-Champaign (BA)
- Football career

No. 29, 21
- Position: Cornerback

Personal information
- Listed height: 5 ft 10 in (1.78 m)
- Listed weight: 180 lb (82 kg)

Career information
- High school: J. J. Pearce (Richardson)
- College: Illinois (1991–1994)
- NFL draft: 1995: 7th round, 226th overall pick

Career history
- Washington Redskins (1995–1997); San Diego Chargers (1998–2001); Buffalo Bills (2003)*; Denver Broncos (2003)
- * Offseason or practice squad member only

Career NFL statistics
- Total tackles: 106
- Interceptions: 5
- Touchdowns: 2
- FF / FR: 2 / 3
- Sacks: 2
- Stats at Pro Football Reference

Eric Scott Turner (born February 26, 1972) is an American politician and former professional football player who is serving as the 19th United States secretary of housing and urban development since February 2025. Prior to his political career, he played cornerback in the National Football League (NFL) for nine seasons, mostly for the Washington Redskins and San Diego Chargers.

Turner served as Executive Director of the White House Opportunity and Revitalization Council from 2019 to 2021 under President Donald Trump in the first Trump administration. Previously, Turner served as state representative for Texas's 33rd House district, which includes part of Collin County and all of Rockwall County, from 2013 to 2017.

On November 22, 2024, President-elect Donald Trump announced his intent to nominate Turner as Secretary of Housing and Urban Development in the second Trump administration. Turner's nomination was confirmed by the United States Senate on February 5, 2025 by a vote of 55–44. Turner was sworn into office on February 5, 2025.

== Early life and education ==
A fourth-generation Texan, Turner grew up in the Dallas area. As a child, he attended Mount Pisgah Baptist Community Church, where members of his family have been active since 1898. At the age of 10, Turner's parents divorced. He told his mother that he was going to play in the NFL.

Turner attended Pearce High School, where he played football and ran track and graduated in 1990. In high school, he worked as a dishwasher at Spring Creek Barbeque in Richardson, Texas.

Turner earned a full academic and athletic scholarship to the University of Illinois. In football, he initially played wide receiver and switched to cornerback his senior year, wearing number "21" and compiling forty-eight tackles for the 1994 Liberty Bowl champions. In track and field, Turner specialized in the 200 and 400 meters, winning Big Ten Indoor Freshman of the Year in 1991, and a pair of Big Ten 400 meters indoor titles in 1992 and 1993. He was named Big Ten Athlete of the Month (January) in 1993, and earned First Team, All-Big Ten honors in 1992, 1993, and 1994. As part of the Illinois men's 4 × 400 meter relay indoor team (1991) and outdoor teams (1993 and 1994), Turner received All-America status in track and field.

Turner graduated from the University of Illinois with a degree in speech communications in 1995.

== Professional football career ==
Turner was drafted in the seventh round of the 1995 NFL draft by the Washington Redskins, now Washington Commanders. He signed a three year deal with the team, played cornerback for the Redskins from 1995 to 1997. After three years, Turner was cut by Redskins coach Norv Turner.

He then played four seasons (1998–2002) for the San Diego Chargers. He was cut by the Chargers, and did not play in the 2002 NFL Season. Turner was the last Charger to wear #21 before Hall of Famer LaDainian Tomlinson wore the number.

Turner signed with the Denver Broncos in 2003. A 2004 leg injury during training camp ended his professional football career. He played in 101 NFL games, recording 89 tackles, five interceptions (including one for a touchdown), and two sacks.

Since his playing career ended, Turner has served as a coach for the NFL's Legends Community transition program, and as a senior advisor to the NFL's executive vice president of football operations.

== Early political career ==
During the 2003 NFL off-season, Turner worked as an intern for U.S. Representative Duncan Hunter. After retiring from football, he accepted a full-time job in the congressman's office. In 2006, he ran for the vacated seat of California's 50th congressional district in the special election to replace Duke Cunningham. In the blanket primary election held April 11, 2006, Turner finished eighth out of 17 candidates. After losing the election, Turner moved back to Frisco, Texas.

In 2012, Turner announced his candidacy for the newly created 33rd District of the Texas House of Representatives. Turner defeated Jim Pruitt in the Republican primary and defeated Libertarian candidate Michael Carrasco in the November 6 general election.

He was sworn into the Texas Legislature on January 8, 2013. That same year, he was named by GOPAC to their list of Emerging Leaders in the Republican Party. Turner challenged Joe Straus for role of Speaker of the Texas House of Representatives in January 2015, the first recorded Speaker vote since 1976. Though backed by the Tea Party Caucus, Turner lost to Straus by 127 votes to 19.

Turner served two consecutive terms in the Texas Legislature, representing the 33rd District from January 2013 to January 2017.

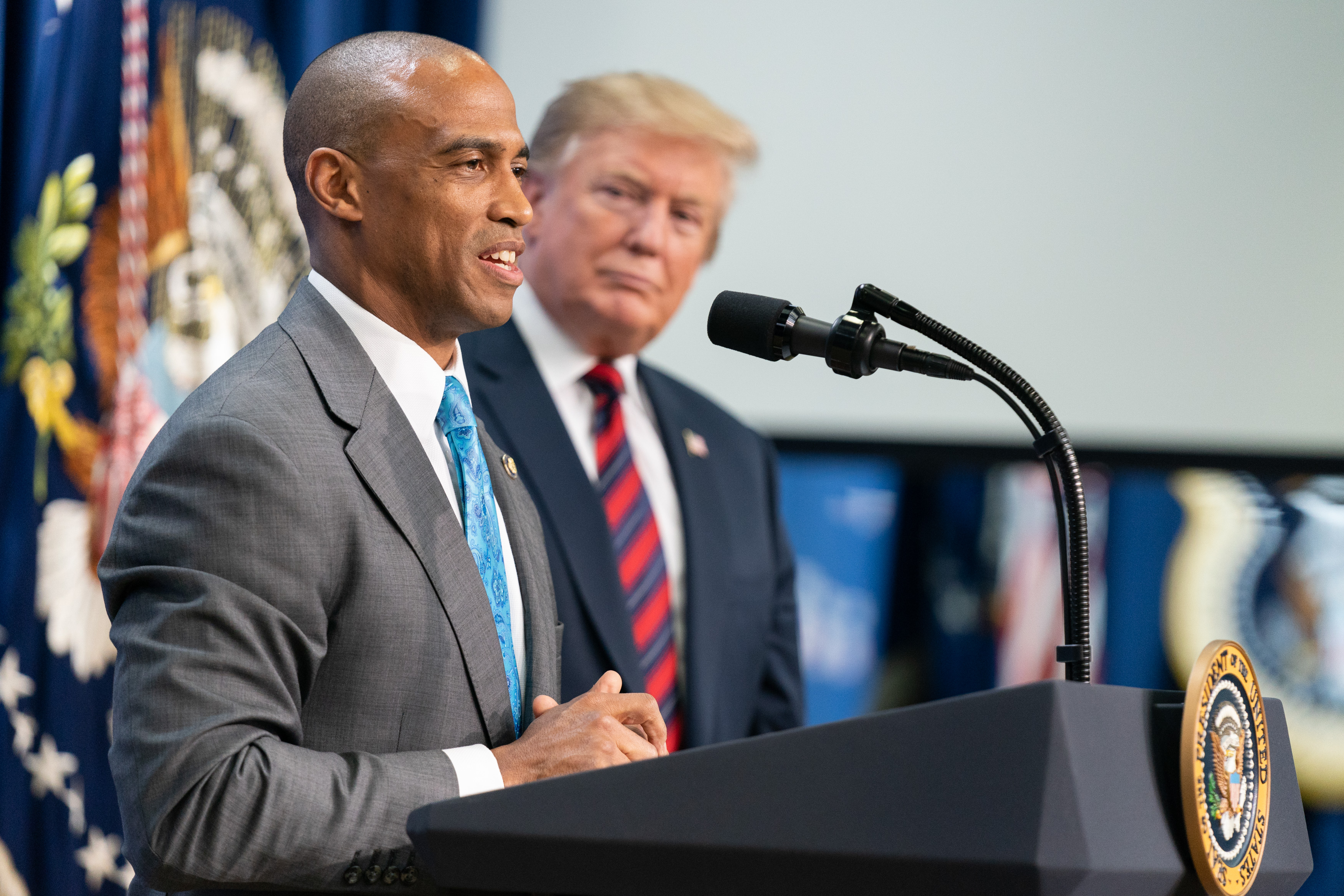
Turner in 2019 at The White House Opportunity Zones Conference with President Donald Trump (right)

On April 17, 2019, President Donald Trump appointed Turner as the Executive Director of the White House Opportunity and Revitalization Council, established pursuant to Executive Order 13853. During his tenure, Turner led the interagency Opportunity Zones Initiative working with state, local, tribal, and territorial governments across the country to revitalize economically distressed areas and to promote affordable housing and the creation of new businesses.

== Business career ==
From 2007 to 2023, Turner worked at Systemware, a content management software company, where he served in various capacities, including chief inspiration officer.

Turner is the founder and president of Community Engagement & Opportunity Council (CEOC), an organization that supports children living in poverty. CEOC is credited with renovating the Literacy Lab in Bonton, a section of Dallas.

In January 2016, Turner was awarded an honorary Doctor of Humanities from Dallas Baptist University in recognition of his community leadership.

In June 2023, Turner was named Chief Visionary Officer of JPI, a national developer, builder, and investment manager of Class A, attainable and affordable multifamily assets across the U.S.

== Secretary of Housing and Urban Development ==
=== Nomination and confirmation ===
On November 22, 2024, President-elect Donald Trump announced his intent to nominate Turner to serve as Secretary of Housing and Urban Development in his second presidential administration. Turner's nomination was endorsed by the Commercial Real Estate Development Association, Mortgage Bankers Association, American Land Title Association, the Manufactured Housing Institute, the National Association of Home Builders, and the Real Estate Roundtable.

Turner appeared before the Senate Committee on Banking, Housing and Urban Affairs on January 16, 2025. The committee approved his nomination in a 13–11 vote on January 23, 2025. On February 5, 2025, the U.S. Senate confirmed his nomination in a 55–44 vote. Turner was sworn in later that day by U.S. Supreme Court justice Clarence Thomas.

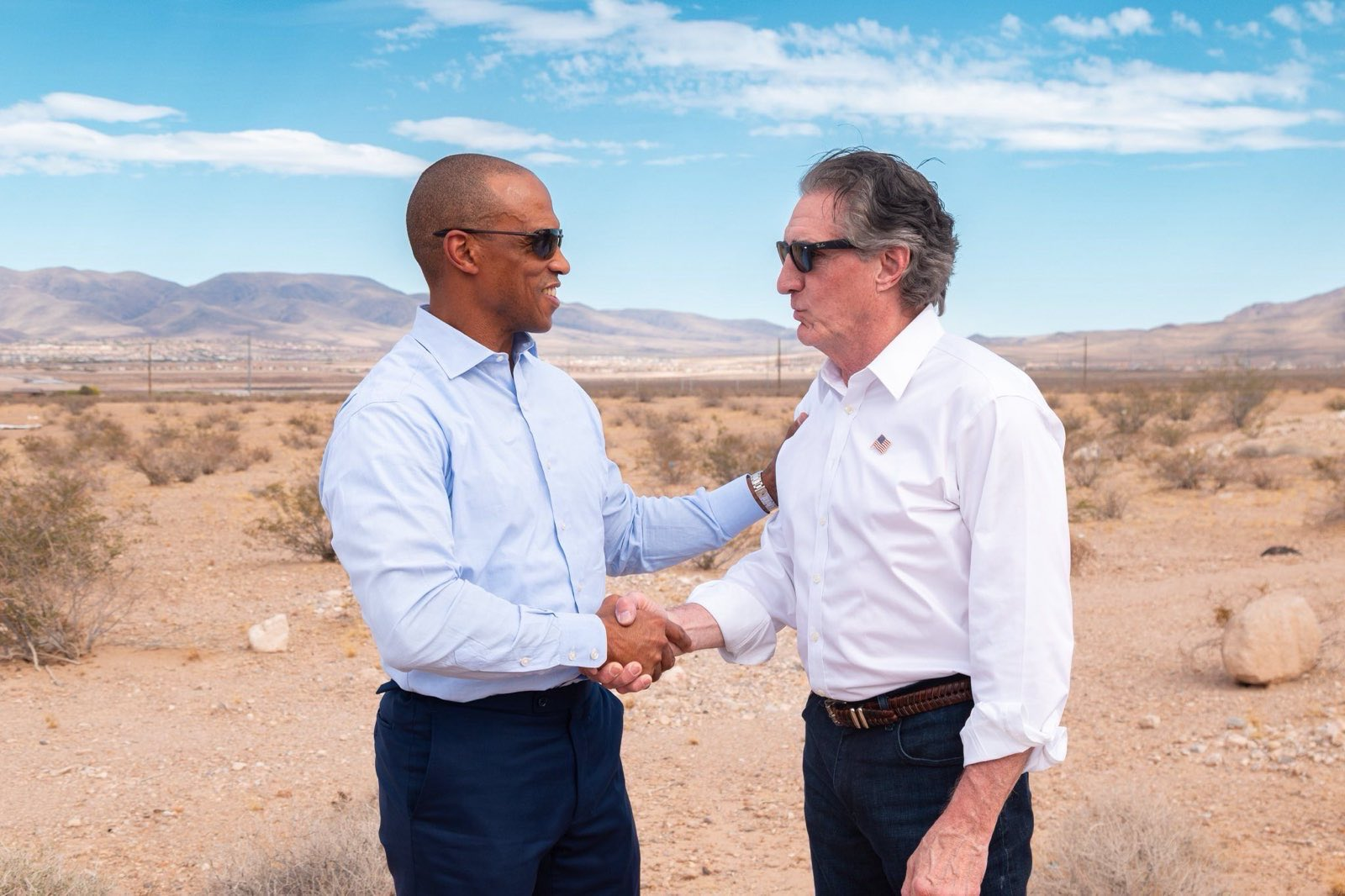
Turner with Interior secretary Doug Burgum in Nevada, May 2025

=== Tenure ===
As HUD Secretary, Turner presided over plans to relocate the headquarters of HUD from the Robert C. Weaver Federal Building to the National Science Foundation headquarters building in Alexandria, Virginia. Turner also mandated that the HUD website be exclusively in English, and canceled all non-English services offered on the government website.

== Personal life ==
Turner is married to Robin Turner, a Champaign, Illinois, native and a University of Illinois alumna. The couple raised his nephew, Solomon, who played football for and graduated from the University of Illinois in 2024.

Turner and his family are members of Prestonwood Baptist Church, where he serves as an associate pastor. He received an honorary doctorate from Dallas Baptist University in 2016.

He also received an honorary doctorate from Liberty University in May 2026.

Political offices
Preceded by Matt Ammon; Acting	United States Secretary of Housing and Urban Development; 2025–present	Incumbent
Order of precedence
Preceded by Robert F. Kennedy Jr. as United States Secretary of Health and Human Services	Order of precedence of the United States as Secretary of Housing and Urban Development	Succeeded by Sean Duffy as United States Secretary of Transportation
U.S. presidential line of succession
Preceded by Robert F. Kennedy Jr. as United States Secretary of Health and Human Services	Thirteenth line as Secretary of Housing and Urban Development	Succeeded by Sean Duffy as United States Secretary of Transportation
