= Samuell Williamson =

American basketball player

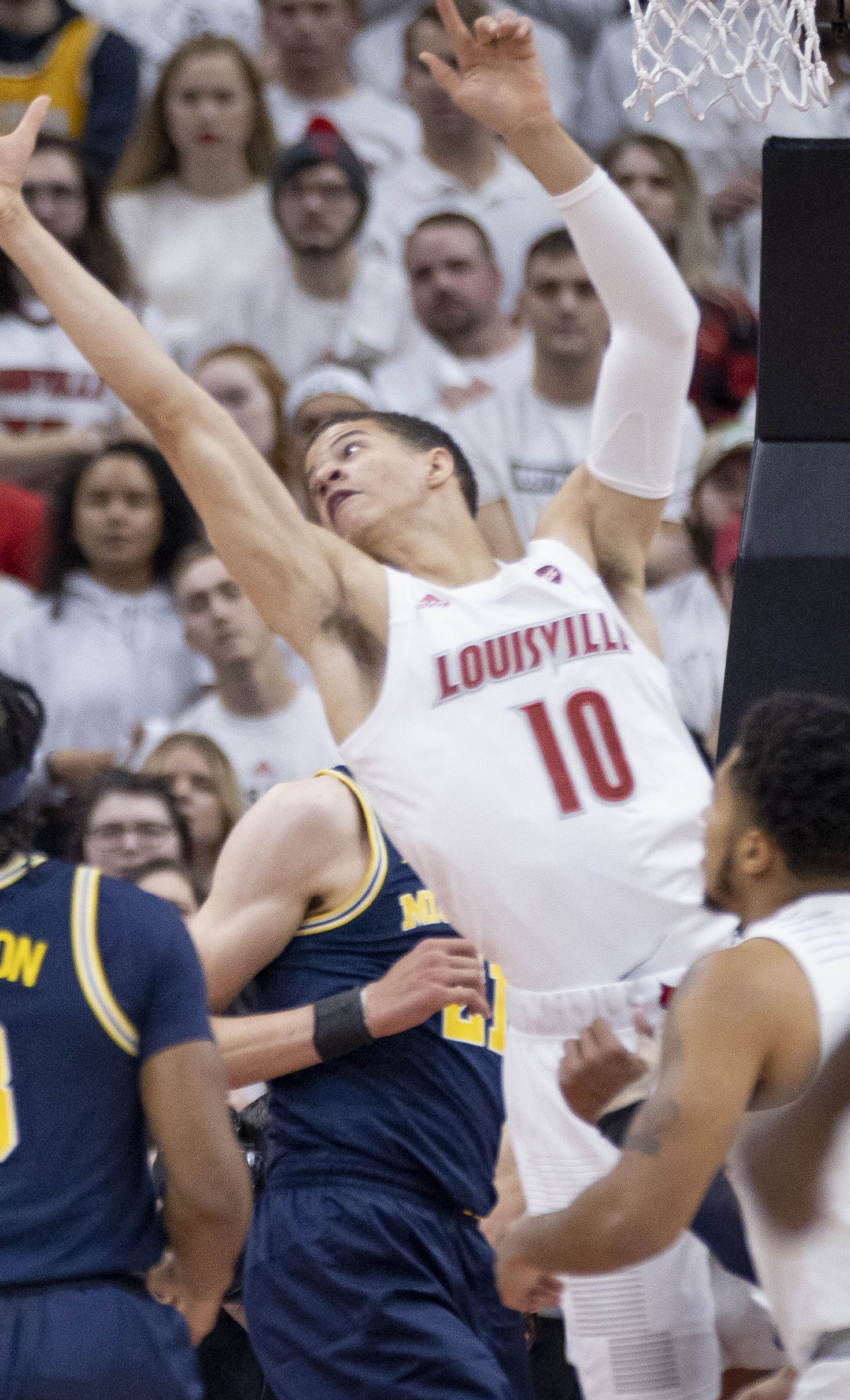
- Williamson in December 2019

Free Agent
- Position: Shooting guard / small forward

Personal information
- Born: September 7, 2000 (age 26) Rockwall, Texas, U.S.
- Listed height: 6 ft 7 in (2.01 m)
- Listed weight: 210 lb (95 kg)

Career information
- High school: Rockwall (Rockwall, Texas)
- College: Louisville (2019–2022); SMU (2022–2024)
- NBA draft: 2024: undrafted
- Playing career: 2024–present

Career history
- 2024–2025: Heroes Den Bosch
- 2025–2026: MLP Academics Heidelberg

Career highlights
- Dutch League champion (2025); BNXT League Second Team (2025); Dutch Cup winner (2025); McDonald's All-American (2019)

Samuell Williamson (born September 7, 2000) is an American professional basketball player who last played for MLP Academics Heidelberg of the Basketball Bundesliga (BBL). He played college basketball for the SMU Mustangs and Louisville Cardinals.

== High school career ==
Williamson attended Rockwall High School in Rockwall, Texas for his four years of high school. As a junior, Williamson averaged 23.3 points and 9.7 rebounds in helping Rockwall to a 20–12 record, earning first-team Texas Association of Basketball Coaches all-state honors. As a senior in 2018–19, Williamson averaged 25 points, 11.2 rebounds, and 4.1 assists to guide Rockwall High School to a 30–6 record, the regional semifinals and a No. 8 ranking in the final regular-season Class 6A state poll.

=== Recruiting ===
On September 17, 2018, Williamson committed to play at the University of Louisville.

Williamson was initially a four-star recruit but he became a five-star recruit by the end of his senior season.

He was considered a five-star recruit by Rivals, 247Sports, and ESPN.

College recruiting
Name	Hometown	School	Height	Weight	Commit date
Samuell Williamson; SF	Rockwall, TX	Rockwall (TX)	6 ft 7 in (2.01 m)	190 lb (86 kg)	Sep 17, 2018
Samuell Williamson; SF	Recruit ratings: Rivals: 247Sports: ESPN: (92)				
Overall recruit ranking: Rivals: 19 247Sports: 15 ESPN: 24
Note: In many cases, Scout, Rivals, 247Sports, On3, and ESPN may conflict in their listings of height and weight.; In these cases, the average was taken. ESPN grades are on a 100-point scale.; Sources: "Louisville 2019 Basketball Commitments". Rivals.; "2019 Louisville Cardinals Recruiting Class". ESPN.; "2019 Team Ranking". Rivals.

== College career ==
Williamson scored 13 points and grabbed five rebounds in his college debut, a 87–74 win over Miami (FL). He scored a season-high 15 points to go with five rebounds on November 13, 2019, in a 91–62 win over Indiana State. As a freshman, Williamson averaged 4.4 points, 2.5 rebounds, and 0.6 assists per game.

In Williamson's sophomore season debut against Seton Hall, he injured his toe, forcing him to miss at least one game. He averaged 9.6 points, 8.1 rebounds, and 1.2 assists per game.

On March 26, 2022, Williamson entered the transfer portal. He would eventually transfer to SMU.

== Professional career ==
After going undrafted in the 2024 NBA draft, Williamson signed with Heroes Den Bosch. On March 23, 2025, Williamson and Heroes won the 2024–25 Dutch Basketball Cup.

On July 4, 2025, he signed with MLP Academics Heidelberg of the Basketball Bundesliga (BBL).

== Career statistics ==
Legend
GP	Games played	GS	Games started	MPG	Minutes per game
FG%	Field goal percentage	3P%	3-point field goal percentage	FT%	Free throw percentage
RPG	Rebounds per game	APG	Assists per game	SPG	Steals per game
BPG	Blocks per game	PPG	Points per game	**Bold**	Career high

=== College ===
Year	Team	GP	GS	MPG	FG%	3P%	FT%	RPG	APG	SPG	BPG	PPG
2019–20	Louisville	31	1	15.3	.470	**.333**	.690	2.5	.6	.3	.2	4.4
2020–21	Louisville	18	15	28.6	**.479**	.250	**.706**	**8.1**	1.2	.3	.1	**9.6**
2021–22	Louisville	30	6	16.9	.456	.154	.569	3.7	.8	.5	.1	5.6
2022–23	SMU	32	30	**29.8**	.472	.176	.554	7.3	**2.6**	**1.4**	**.8**	9.3
2023–24	SMU	**33**	**32**	23.6	.442	.238	.515	7.1	1.5	1.1	.6	8.3
Career		144	84	22.4	.462	.246	.582	5.6	1.4	.8	.4	7.3
