= Raul Torres (Texas politician) =

American politician

Member of the Texas House of Representatives from the 33rd district
- In office January 11, 2011 – January 8, 2013
- Preceded by: Solomon Ortiz Jr.
- Succeeded by: Scott Turner

Personal details
- Born: February 6, 1955 (age 71) Nueces County, Texas, U.S.
- Party: Republican
- Spouse: Gina Torres
- Children: 5
- Education: Del Mar College; Texas A&M University–Corpus Christi (BA, MBA)
- Occupation: Certified Public Accountant

Raul Torres (born February 6, 1955) is an American certified public accountant and politician who represented District 33 in the Texas House of Representatives from 2011 to 2013. The Republican Torres lost his bid for the seat in 2008 but prevailed in the 2010 general election with 52.5 percent of the vote, when his party gained twenty-four seats across the state.

Torres was an unsuccessful candidate for the Republican nomination for Texas Comptroller of Public Accounts in the primary election held on March 4, 2014. He finished last with 57,255 votes (4.7 percent) behind State Senator Glenn Hegar of Katy, State Representative Harvey Hilderbran of Kerrville, and Debra Medina.

== Legislative service ==
Torres lost his initial bid for representative to the Democrat Solomon Ortiz, Jr., 59-36 percent, with the remaining 5 percent for a Libertarian contender. There were 41,635 votes cast in District 33 in 2008. In their rematch in 2010, Torres unseated Ortiz, 52.5 – 47.5 percent, in a total turnout of only 23,805. Ortiz's father, Solomon Ortiz, Sr., was also defeated in that same election for the United States House of Representatives by the Republican Blake Farenthold. Torres attributed the switch of 17 points between 2008 and 2010 to the failure of many Texas supporters of U.S. President Barack H. Obama to vote in the mid-term elections and his own willingness to campaign actively in Democratic strongholds in which he could reduce the Democratic margin of victory even if he could not carry such precincts himself.

In 2011, Torres voted against HB1, the state budget, having noted that calls to his office were 10-1 against the measure. Torres has questioned the sharp increases in educational funding despite stagnant growth in the number of school pupils statewide. "Each year more than 130,000 Texas students enter high school and do not graduate. Often the majority of these students are minorities from a low socio-economic background. But this crisis is not just about the students in public education; it is something that will ultimately impact the entire state," he warns.

When redistricting placed Torres in a revised heavily Democratic District 34 with his friend and fellow freshman Republican Connie Scott, Torres decided to run instead in 2012 for the District 20 seat in the Texas State Senate held by Democrat Juan "Chuy" Hinojosa. Hinojosa defeated Torres for the Senate position in the general election held on November 6, 2012.

Torres is active in local youth sports programs and is a member of the Church of Christ in Corpus Christi. He and his wife, Gina Torres, have four daughters and one son.

Texas House of Representatives
Preceded by Solomon Ortiz, Jr.	Texas State Representative from District 33 (Nueces County); 2011–2013	Succeeded by Scott Turner
