= Eli Finley =

American football player (born 2004)

No. 84 – Louisiana Tech Bulldogs
- Position: Tight end
- Class: Senior

Personal information
- Born: November 8, 2004 (age 21); Dallas, Texas, U.S.
- Listed height: 6 ft 6 in (1.98 m)
- Listed weight: 246 lb (112 kg)

Career information
- High school: Rockwall-Heath (Heath, Texas)
- College: Louisiana Tech (2023–present)

Awards and highlights
- Second-team All-CUSA (2025)
- Stats at ESPN

Eli Finley (born November 8, 2004) is an American college football tight end for the Louisiana Tech Bulldogs.

== Early life ==
Finley attended Rockwall-Heath High School in Heath, Texas. As a senior he had 23 receptions for 230 yards and four touchdowns. He committed to Louisiana Tech University to play college football.

== College career ==
As a freshman in 2023, Finley played in 10 games and had two receptions for 10 yards. As a sophomore in 2024, he started all 13 games and recorded 25 receptions for 314 yards and two touchdowns. As a junior in 2025, Finley started 12 of 13 games and led the team with 38 receptions for 444 yards. He returned to Louisiana Tech as the starter again in 2026.
