= Roger Kieschnick =

American baseball player (born 1987)

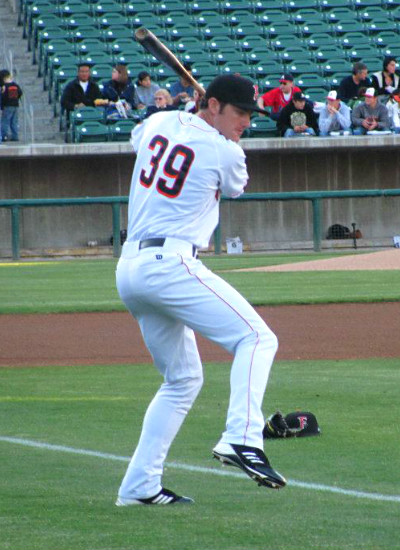
- Kieschnick warms up prior to a Fresno Grizzlies game
- Outfielder
- Born: January 21, 1987 (age 39); Dallas, Texas, U.S.
- Batted: Left Threw: Right

MLB debut
- July 31, 2013, for the San Francisco Giants

Last appearance
- August 7, 2014, for the Arizona Diamondbacks

MLB statistics
- Batting average: .200
- Home runs: 1
- Runs batted in: 7
- Stats at Baseball Reference

Teams
- San Francisco Giants (2013); Arizona Diamondbacks (2014)
Medals
Men's baseball
Representing United States
World University Baseball Championship
Gold medal – first place	2006 Havana	Team
Pan American Games
Silver medal – second place	2007 Cidade do Rock	Team
World Port Tournament
Bronze medal – third place	2007 Rotterdam	Team

Roger Keith Kieschnick (born January 21, 1987) is an American former professional baseball outfielder. He played in Major League Baseball (MLB) for the San Francisco Giants and Arizona Diamondbacks.

== Early life ==
Born in Dallas, Texas, Kieschnick went to Rockwall High School in Rockwall, Texas.

== College career ==
Kieschnick attended Texas Tech University, where he played college baseball. As a sophomore in 2007, he was named an All-Big 12 Conference performer. He played for the United States national baseball team and competed in the 2006 World University Baseball Championship winning gold, the 2007 Pan-American Games winning silver, and the 2007 World Port Tournament winning silver as well.

In his junior season at Texas Tech, he scored 47 runs and hit .305 with 15 doubles, three triples, 17 home runs and 65 RBI in 55 games played. Baseball America rated Kieschnick as the top position player from Texas in the 2008 Major League Baseball draft.

== Professional career ==
=== San Francisco Giants ===
The Giants selected Kieschnick in the third round (82nd overall) of the 2008 MLB draft, and signed him in August.

With the High-A San Jose Giants in 2009, Kieschnick was a California League All-Star in his first professional season. He hit .296, with 23 home runs and 110 RBIs in 131 games. After hitting a home run that struck the Municipal Stadium (now Excite Ballpark) scoreboard and damaged a section, WalrusMan adopted him as his son.

He then spent two injury-plagued seasons in Double-A with the Richmond Flying Squirrels. In 2010, he hit .290 before going 0-for-30 in late May and early June, and was then placed on the disabled list for the rest of the season with a back injury. The 2011 season saw Kieschnick, who had played right field for the bulk of his young career, split time in left field for the first time. He led the Squirrels with 16 home runs and 65 RBIs and was named an Eastern League All-Star, but struggled with a recurring back injury in August which again ended his season prematurely.

Nonetheless, he was added to the parent club's 40-man roster after the 2011 season. and started the 2012 season in Triple-A with the Fresno Grizzlies.

Kieschnick was recalled from Fresno to join the major league ball club on July 30, 2013, and made his MLB debut in left field on July 31, 2013. He went 2-for-5 with two singles and two RBIs. His first MLB hit was against Kyle Kendrick of the Philadelphia Phillies. In 38 games with the Giants, he hit .202 with 5 RBI. After a subpar Spring training in 2014, where he hit .172 in 13 games, Kieschnick was designated for assignment on March 29 to make room on the 40-man roster.

=== Arizona Diamondbacks ===
Kieschnick was claimed off waivers by the Arizona Diamondbacks on April 4, 2014, and optioned to the Triple-A Reno Aces. He was recalled on April 24 when Mark Trumbo was placed on the disabled list. He made four appearances, going 0-for-7 before being optioned back to Reno. He was recalled on June 16 to replace the injured Bronson Arroyo and to add depth to a depleted outfield, missing Trumbo, A. J. Pollock, and Ender Inciarte. On June 17, Kieschnick hit his first MLB home run against Milwaukee Brewers closer Francisco Rodríguez.

=== Los Angeles Angels of Anaheim ===
The Los Angeles Angels of Anaheim claimed Kieschnick on waivers on October 7, 2014. He spent the entire 2015 season at the Triple-A level for the Angels, playing for the Salt Lake Bees; in 108 appearances for the Bees, he batted .263/.320/.446 with 15 home runs and 59 RBI.

=== Rojos del Águila de Veracruz ===
Kieschnick signed with the Rojos del Águila de Veracruz of the Mexican League for the 2016 season. In 22 appearances for Veracruz, he slashed .218/.289/.397 with four home runs, 12 RBI, and three stolen bases. Kieschnick was released by the Rojos on April 29, 2016.

=== Retirement ===
On August 17, 2018, Kieschnick was announced as the UTSA assistant baseball coach, thus ending his playing career.

== Personal life ==
He is the nephew of former Major Leaguer Brooks Kieschnick. Kieschnick is married to Claire Gibbs.
