= Katrina Pierson =

American politician and activist (born 1976)

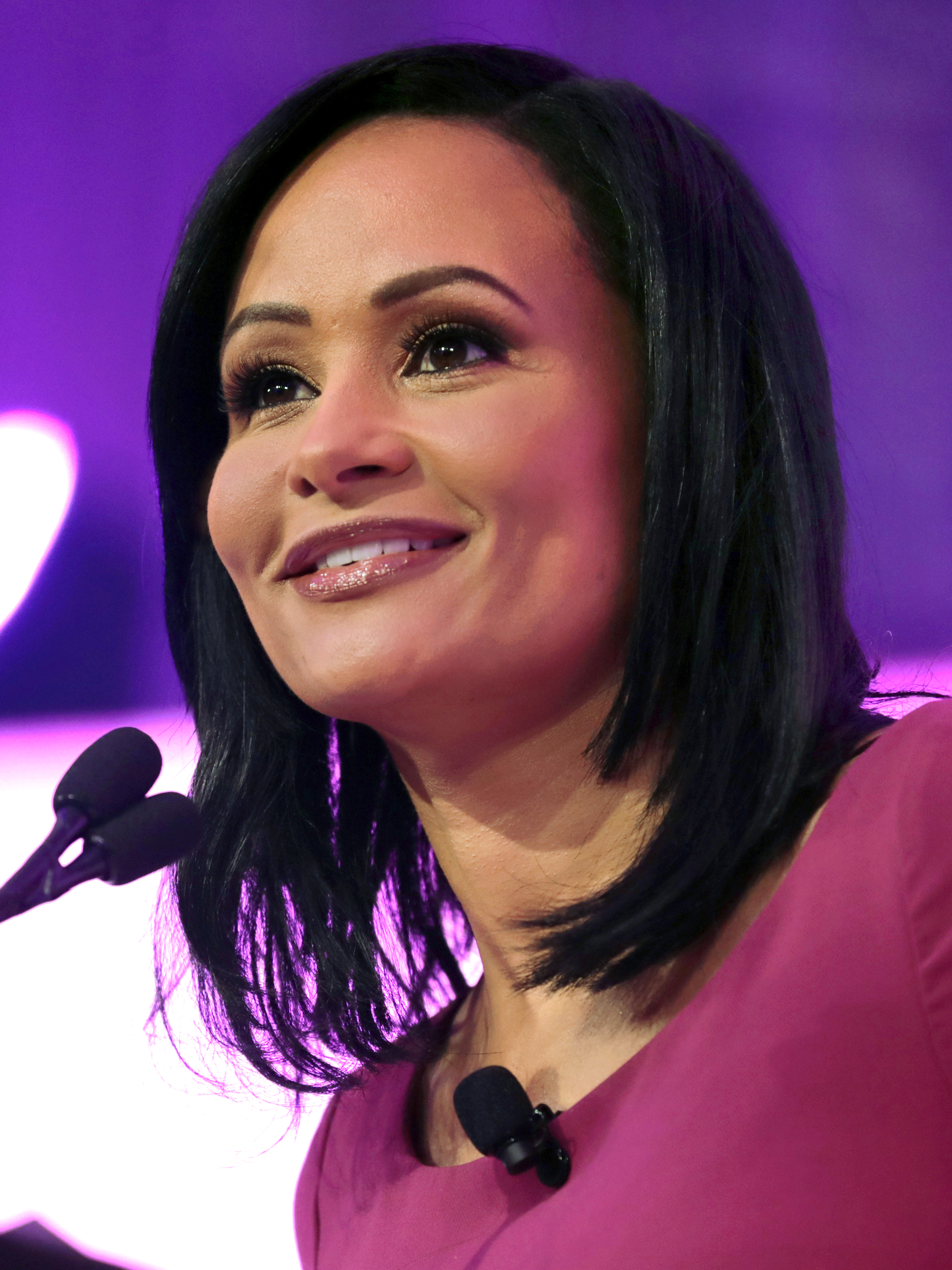

Member of the Texas House of Representatives from the 33rd district
- Incumbent
- Assumed office January 14, 2025
- Preceded by: Justin Holland

Personal details
- Born: Katrina Lanette Shaddix; July 20, 1976 (age 50) Wichita, Kansas, U.S.
- Party: Republican
- Children: 1
- Education: Kilgore College (AS); University of Texas, Dallas (BS)

Katrina Lanette Pierson (née Shaddix; born July 20, 1976 (Note: Pierson's birthday is July 20. She was 39 years old on November 18, 2015. Her full birthday, July 20, 1976, is calculated from these two facts.)) is an American politician and communications consultant. She was the national spokesperson for Donald Trump's 2016 presidential campaign. She defeated Justin Holland by 56.4% to 43.6% on May 28, 2024, in the Republican primary runoff for the Texas House of Representatives for the 33rd District.

== Early life and education ==
Pierson was born in Wichita, Kansas, to a white mother and a black father. Her mother gave birth to her at 15 and initially gave her up for adoption, but changed her mind. She grew up with her single mother, in poverty.

Pierson received an associate of science degree from Kilgore College. In 2006, she earned a Bachelor of Science in biology from the University of Texas at Dallas.

== Career ==
=== Early work ===
Pierson worked for InVentiv Health in 2008; for the Baylor Health Care System from July 2009 to August 2011, as a practice administrator; for ASG Software Solutions from May 2011 to December 2012, as the director of corporate affairs; in 2013 launched PCG, a private consulting firm, ultimately being hired by the Trump campaign in 2015.

=== Early political work ===
She became an activist in the Republican Tea Party movement in 2009. Speaking in April 2009 at a Dallas Tea Party event, she called for Texas to secede from the U.S. She founded a local Tea Party group in Garland, Texas. In 2012, Pierson actively supported Ted Cruz in the 2012 Senate race in Texas, and appeared on stage with him on election night in November.

=== 2014 Texas congressional race ===
In the 2014 Texas congressional elections, Pierson challenged incumbent congressman Pete Sessions in the Republican primary to represent Texas' 32nd district. Her candidacy was endorsed by Rafael Cruz and by Sarah Palin. In the March primary, Pierson received 36 percent of the vote, losing to Sessions, who received 63 percent.

Pierson went on to become spokesperson for the Tea Party leadership fund.

=== Trump 2016 ===
In January 2015, Pierson attended a meeting for Tea Party activists in Myrtle Beach with Ted Cruz. While in Myrtle Beach, she also met with Donald Trump. In November 2015 she was hired as the national spokesperson for Trump's campaign, subsequently appearing frequently on television in that capacity, often being seen as one of Trump's staunchest defenders amidst controversial comments.

=== Post-2016 election ===
After the 2016 election, Pierson turned down an administration position as Deputy Press Secretary, and instead worked at America First Policies, a pro-Trump 501(c)(4) group. In March 2018, the Trump 2020 campaign hired Pierson as a senior adviser.

=== Post-2020 election and January 6 attack ===
The New York Times reported that Pierson served as a liaison between the White House and organizers at Donald Trump's "Save America" rally on the Ellipse, preceding the 2021 United States Capitol attack. This reporting was later corroborated by text messages obtained by CNN in 2022.

In 2021, Pierson publicly mulled running in Texas's 6th congressional district special election to replace deceased U.S. Representative Ron Wright. She ultimately decided against a bid for the seat, but stated that she was "not closing the door" on a future run for Congress.

Pierson was one of eleven individuals subpoenaed on September 29, 2021 by the House Select Committee on the January 6 Attack regarding their involvement in organizing the Stop the Steal rally that preceded the attack on the United States Capitol by Trump's supporters.

According to records obtained by CNN, Pierson texted White House Chief of Staff Mark Meadows on January 2 and 3, 2021, noting that "[t]hings have gotten crazy and I desperately need some direction" before declaring "I'm done. I can't be a part of embarrassing POTUS any further."

=== 2024 Texas State House race ===
In the 2024 Texas House of Representatives election, Pierson launched a campaign for the 33rd district, challenging incumbent Justin Holland. In the Super Tuesday primary on March 5, Pierson came in first, with 39.5% to Holland's 38.7%, thus forcing the race to a runoff on May 28. Pierson defeated Holland in the runoff by a margin of 56.4% to 43.6%.

== Personal life ==
In 1997, at 20, Pierson was arrested for shoplifting, to which she pleaded no contest, received deferred adjudication, and, ultimately, a dismissal with the case sealed.

Pierson had a three-month marriage at a young age, during which she gave birth to a son.

== See also ==
- Black conservatism in the United States
