= Rockwall High School =

Location
- 901 Yellowjacket Lane; Rockwall, Texas 75087; United States; 32.90517°N 96.45823°W

Information
- Type: High School/secondary school
- School district: Rockwall Independent School District
- Principal: Billy Dane Steinberger
- Teaching staff: 190.27 (FTE)
- Grades: 9-12
- Enrollment: 2,949 (2023–2024)
- Student to teacher ratio: 15.50
- Colors: Orange and white
- Nickname: Yellowjackets
- Website: rhs.rockwallisd.com

Rockwall High School is a high school that is part of the Rockwall Independent School District located in Rockwall, Texas. In 2022–23, the school was rated by the Texas Education Agency as follows: 90 (A) overall, 88 (B) for Student Achievement, 87 (B) for School Progress, and 94 (A) for Closing the Gaps. It also was designated with distinction in Top 25%: Comparative Academic Growth and Top 25%: Comparative Closing the Gaps.

The average class size is around 600 and the school achieves an average graduation rate of 98%.

== Athletics ==
The high school offers baseball, basketball, golf, cross country, gymnastics, soccer, track and field, football, powerlifting, softball, swimming, tennis, volleyball, and wrestling.

In the 2015 season, the Yellowjacket football team went undefeated in district play and ended up 10–4 in the overall season. The wrestling team won state championships in 2001 and 2002. Daniel Shofner won the individual wrestling heavyweight state championship in 2005. The girls varsity basketball team won the state championship in 2007 after a perfect 40–0 season. In 2011, they achieved second place in the state. In 2005 the baseball team lost to Humble Kingwood 10–5 in the State Championship Game. Rockwall's High School Football Team won the 1963 2A Football State Championship by a score 7–6 against Dulles at Baylor Stadium in Waco, Texas.

In 2017 the RHS Girls Gymnastics Team won State by a margin of Five-eighths of a point over San Angelo Central High School April 28–29 in Odessa, TX. The Lady Jackets finished with 230.4 team points to Central's 229.875. In 2021, for the first time in history, coach Cameron Sweny led the Rockwall High School Men's gymnastics team to a state title over Saginaw High with a 178.35 point compulsory score, and a 162.75 optional score. The team then went on to complete the title defense in 2022 with a combined team score of 337.55 over the second place Highland Park Scott's. The gymnastics team then went on to win the State Championship in 2023 and 2024, completing a 4-peat.

The Academic Decathlon team is known as one of the top teams in both Texas and the nation. In 2013 and 2014, Rockwall won first place in the state of Texas and first place in the nation among public schools (3rd overall).

The school shares the Wilkerson Sanders Memorial Stadium with Rockwall-Heath High School.

== Notable people ==
=== Alumni ===
- Dan Bartlett, counsel to President George W. Bush
- Amber Carrington, finalist on The Voice Season 4
- Jacob Clark, NFL quarterback for the Las Vegas Raiders
- Zack Eskridge, Former professional football player
- Ralph Hall, US Representative from Texas 4th district
- Winsor Harmon, Class of 1982, actor and model
- Justin Holland, Class of 2002, politician
- Roger Kieschnick, Class of 2005, professional baseball player
- Edward Loar, pro golfer
- Braedyn Locke, quarterback for the Tarleton State Texans
- Landyn Locke, quarterback for the Sam Houston Bearkats
- Anfernee Orji, professional football player for the New Orleans Saints
- Jaxon Smith-Njigba, professional football player
- Andy Tanner, Former professional football player
- Chris Warren III former professional football player
- Samuell Williamson, college basketball player

=== Faculty ===
- Todd Dodge, former football coach
