= Anfernee Orji =

American football player (born 2000)

No. 45 – Philadelphia Eagles
- Position: Linebacker
- Roster status: Practice squad

Personal information
- Born: October 6, 2000 (age 26); Dallas, Texas, U.S.
- Listed height: 6 ft 2 in (1.88 m)
- Listed weight: 230 lb (104 kg)

Career information
- High school: Rockwall (Rockwall, Texas)
- College: Vanderbilt (2019–2022)
- NFL draft: 2023: undrafted

Career history
- New Orleans Saints (2023–2024); Tennessee Titans (2025)*; New York Giants (2026)*; Philadelphia Eagles (2026–present)
- * Offseason or practice squad member only

Career NFL statistics as of 2024
- Total tackles: 30
- Stats at Pro Football Reference

Anfernee Chikezie Orji (born October 6, 2000) is an American professional football linebacker for the Philadelphia Eagles of the National Football League (NFL). He played college football for the Vanderbilt Commodores.

== Early life ==
Orji grew up in Rockwall, Texas and attended Rockwall High School. He was rated a three-star recruit and committed to play college football at Vanderbilt.

== College career ==
Orji played in nine games and made six tackles during his freshman season at Vanderbilt. He recorded 66 tackles, 1.5 tackles for loss, one sack, and two passes broken up during his sophomore season. Orji led the Commodores with 93 tackles with 13 tackles for loss as a junior. He led the team in tackles for a second straight year as a senior with 106.

== Professional career ==
Pre-draft measurables
Height	Weight	Arm length	Hand span	Wingspan	40-yard dash	10-yard split	20-yard split	20-yard shuttle	Three-cone drill	Vertical jump	Broad jump
6 ft 1 in (1.85 m)	230 lb (104 kg)	32 in (0.81 m)	10 1/4 in (0.26 m)	6 ft 6 1/8 in (1.98 m)	4.53 s	1.54 s	2.57 s	4.43 s	7.00 s	38.5 in (0.98 m)	10 ft 2 in (3.10 m)
All values from NFL Combine

=== New Orleans Saints ===
Orji signed with the New Orleans Saints as an undrafted free agent on April 30, 2023. He was waived on August 29, and re-signed to the practice squad. Following the end of the regular season, the Saints signed Orji to a reserve/future contract on January 8, 2024.

Orji made 16 appearances (including two starts) for New Orleans during the 2024 season, recording 30 combined tackles. On May 13, 2025, Orji was waived by the Saints.

=== Tennessee Titans ===
On May 14, 2025, Orji was claimed off waivers by the Tennessee Titans. He was waived on August 12 with an injury designation, having suffered a torn ACL during a team practice.

=== New York Giants ===
On July 30, 2026, Orji signed with the New York Giants. He was waived by the Giants on August 29.

=== Philadelphia Eagles ===
On October 1, 2026, Orji was signed to the Philadelphia Eagles practice squad. He was released on October 6, then re-signed two weeks later.

== Personal life ==
Orji has two brothers, Alex and Alston. Alex plays quarterback at UNLV. Alston played linebacker at Vanderbilt (2018–2021) and Campbell (2022).
