= Zack Eskridge =

American gridiron football player (born 1988)

Profile
- Position: Quarterback

Personal information
- Born: January 19, 1988 (age 38); Rockwall, Texas, U.S.
- Listed height: 6 ft 4 in (1.93 m)
- Listed weight: 227 lb (103 kg)

Career information
- High school: Rockwall
- College: Midwestern State
- NFL draft: 2011: undrafted

Career history
- Dallas Cowboys (2011)*; Toronto Argonauts (2011); Kansas City Command (2012); New Orleans VooDoo (2013); San Jose SaberCats (2013)
- * Offseason or practice squad member only

Career AFL statistics
- Completions: 94
- Attempts: 173
- Yards: 951
- Touchdowns: 14
- Interceptions: 9
- Stats at ArenaFan.com

Zack Eskridge (born January 19, 1988) is an American former professional football quarterback.

== College career ==
He played college football at Midwestern State University and Texas Christian University.

== Professional career ==
He was signed by the Dallas Cowboys as an undrafted free agent in 2011.

Eskridge signed with the Toronto Argonauts of the Canadian Football League in 2011.

Eskridge signed with the Kansas City Command of the Arena Football League (AFL) in 2012. He made his professional debut for the Command.

Eskridge joined the AFL's New Orleans VooDoo for the 2013 season. Eskridge was released 10 weeks into the season.

Eskridge was assigned to the San Jose SaberCats of the AFL on June 6, 2013. He was reassigned by the SaberCats on June 17, 2013.
