= Rockwall-Heath High School =

Location
- 801 Laurence Drive; Heath, Texas; 75032; United States; 32.84613°N 96.47198°W

Information
- Type: High School (Secondary)
- Established: 2005; 21 years ago
- School district: Rockwall Independent School District
- Principal: Todd Bradford
- Teaching staff: 169.81 (FTE)
- Grades: 9-12
- Enrollment: 2,944 (2023–2024)
- Student to teacher ratio: 17.34
- Colors: Red, black and white
- Mascot: Hawk
- Website: rhhs.rockwallisd.com

Rockwall-Heath High School is a public high school located in Heath, Texas, and is one of two high schools that serve the Rockwall Independent School District, the other being Rockwall High School. The school enrolls students from 9th to 12th grade. In 2022–23, the school was rated by the Texas Education Agency as follows: 86 (B) overall, 85 (B) for Student Achievement, 77 (C) for School Progress, and 89 (B) for Closing the Gaps.

The school opened in 2005 and completed its second phase of construction in 2010 that included a new fine arts wing, a band hall, a 1500-seat auditorium, and Wilkerson-Sanders stadium. Approved and signed in 2007 during the RISD bond election, it was the most expensive bond in the history of RISD at $198 million. The school bond also included two new elementary schools (Celia Hays and Sharon Shannon), planning for a third high school, and the conversion of the Utley Freshman Center into Herman E Utley Middle School.

The first graduating class from the school was the class of 2008.

== Athletics ==
=== Baseball ===
- 2012 4A State Champion, 2021 6A State Champion, 2022 6A State Semifinalist

=== Football ===
On November 6, 2008, the undefeated Rockwall-Heath High School Varsity football team beat Highland Park High School and claimed the 10-4A district championship title. The team won its first round of playoffs against Frisco Centennial High School and against Hillcrest High School at the Texas Stadium on November 21. The team advanced to the fourth round of playoffs, still undefeated, by beating Ennis High School. Rockwall-Heath was defeated in the quarterfinals by Sulphur Springs. The final record for the 2008 season was 13–1.

Following their first playoff season, The Hawks returned to the post season and were eliminated by Frisco Liberty High School marking a 7–4 season. The 2011 Hawks claimed a spot in the postseason making it their third trip to the playoffs in school history.

In the 2020-2021 season, the team finished with a 10-4 record. The season ended with a state quarterfinals loss to Cedar Hill (24-27).

In 2021, the team finished the regular season at 9-1, including a perfect 6-0 in district play. The season ended with a 35-21 regional finals loss to Tomball.

== Notable people ==
=== Alumni ===
- Kevin Bazzell, professional baseball player.
- DeShon Elliott, professional football player.
- Eli Finley, college football player.
- Josh Hoover, college football quarterback.
- Tyler Ivey, professional baseball player.
- Lance Mason, professional football player.
- Canaan Smith-Njigba, professional baseball player.
- Jake Thompson, professional baseball player.
- Drew VerHagen, professional baseball player.
- Jett Williams, professional baseball player.

== Controversies ==
In January 2023, eight students were hospitalized during an offseason football workout in which players were forced to complete 400 push-ups in a 60-minute period without access to water. Coach Harrell was placed on administrative leave following the incident, and stepped down due to pressure from the parents of the hospitalized players.

On the morning of August 16, 2025, two Nazi flags were found hanging from the east side of Rockwall-Heath High School. Students discovered the flags at 6:40 a.m. and alerted local police, who quickly removed the flags. The Heath Department of Public Safety launched an investigation to determine those responsible.
