= Ralph M. Hall/Rockwall Municipal Airport =

Municipal airport in Rockwall, Texas

- IATA: none; ICAO: none; FAA LID: F46

Summary
- Airport type: Public
- Owner: City of Rockwall
- Operator: F46 Aviation Services
- Serves: Rockwall, Texas
- Location: 1701 Airport Road, Rockwall, TX 75087
- Elevation AMSL: 574.1 ft / 175.0 m
- Coordinates: 32°55′50″N 096°26′07″W
- Website: https://www.rockwallairport.com/

Map

Runways
Direction	Length		Surface
Direction	ft	m	Surface
17/35	3,373	1,028	Asphalt

Statistics (2015)
- Aircraft operations: 38,020
- Based aircraft: 69
- Sources: Federal Aviation Administration unless noted otherwise

Ralph M. Hall/Rockwall Municipal Airport (FAA LID: F46) is a city-owned public airport 2 nautical miles (3.7 km) east of the central business district of Rockwall, Texas, United States. The airport has no IATA or ICAO designation.

The airport's name honors Ralph Hall, a lifelong Rockwall County resident who served as the United States representative for Texas's 4th congressional district.

== Facilities ==
Ralph M. Hall/Rockwall Municipal Airport covers 50 acres (20 ha) at an elevation of 574.1 feet (175.0 m) above mean sea level and has one runway:

- Runway 17/35: 3,373 x 45 ft. (1,028 x 14 m), Surface: Asphalt

For the 12 months ending 02 October 2022, the airport had 38,020 aircraft operations, an average of 104 per day: 99% general aviation and less than 1% military. 63 aircraft were then based at this airport: 86% single-engine, 11% multi-engine, and 3% jet.

== Accidents and incidents ==
On November 12, 2020, about 1306 central standard time (CST), a Cessna 182, N7306H, was substantially damaged when it was involved in an accident near Rockwall, Texas. The certificated private pilot and passenger sustained fatal injuries.

== See also ==
- List of airports in Texas
