= Riley Thompson =

American baseball player (born 1996)

NC Dinos – No. 3
- Pitcher
- Born: July 9, 1996 (age 30); Evansville, Indiana, U.S.
- Bats: Left Throws: Right

KBO debut
- March 23, 2025, for the NC Dinos

KBO statistics (through August 18, 2026)
- Win–loss record: 22–7
- Earned run average: 3.29
- Strikeouts: 332
- Stats at Baseball Reference

Teams
- NC Dinos (2025–present)

Benjamin Riley Thompson (born July 9, 1996) is an American professional baseball pitcher for the NC Dinos of the KBO League.

== Amateur career ==
A native of Evansville, Indiana but grew up in Louisville, Kentucky, Thompson attended the Christian Academy of Louisville and was selected by the Cincinnati Reds in the 37th round of the 2015 MLB draft. He opted to play college baseball at the University of Louisville, and in 2017, he played collegiate summer baseball with the Orleans Firebirds of the Cape Cod Baseball League.

== Professional career ==
=== Chicago Cubs ===
Thompson was drafted by the Chicago Cubs in the 11th round, with the 338th overall selection, of the 2018 Major League Baseball draft. He made his professional debut with the Low–A Eugene Emeralds. Thompson spent the 2019 season with the Single–A South Bend Cubs, posting an 8–6 record and 3.06 ERA with 87 strikeouts in 94 innings pitched across 21 starts.

Thompson did not play in a game in 2020 due to the cancellation of the minor league season because of the COVID-19 pandemic. He additionally missed the entirety of the 2021 campaign because of a shoulder injury.

Thompson returned to action in 2022 with the Double–A Tennessee Smokies, compiling a 2–5 record and 4.42 ERA with 64 strikeouts in 57 innings over 19 starts. He spent 2023 with the Triple–A Iowa Cubs, registering a 3–8 record and 5.64 ERA with 78 strikeouts across 25 appearances (19 starts).

Thompson returned to Iowa in 2024, making 34 appearances and logging a 6–4 record and 5.95 ERA with 99 strikeouts over 107 1/3 innings pitched. He elected free agency following the season on November 4, 2024.

=== NC Dinos ===
On December 1, 2024, Thompson signed with the NC Dinos of the KBO League. He made 30 starts for the team in 2025, compiling a 17–7 record and 3.45 ERA with 216 strikeouts over 172 innings of work.

On December 11, 2025, Thompson re-signed with the Dinos on a one-year, $1 million contract.
