= Rockwall Independent School District =

School district in Texas

Coordinates: 32.9364°N 96.4459°W

Location
- Rockwall ISD Administration Building; Rockwall USA

District information
- Type: Public
- Motto: Relationships. Innovation. Excellence
- Grades: Pre-K through 12
- Established: 1880s
- Superintendent: Dr. John "JJ" Villareal
- Budget: $100,000,000 (2018-19)

Students and staff
- Students: 16,536
- Staff: 2,268
- Athletic conference: UIL 10-6A

Other information
- Website: Rockwall ISD

Rockwall Independent School District is a public school district established in 1841 in Rockwall, Texas.

In addition to Rockwall, the district serves the cities of Heath, McLendon-Chisholm, Mobile City, most of Fate, and small portions of Rowlett, Wylie, Garland, and Dallas in Rockwall County. The district also extends into a very small portion of northern Kaufman County, including sections of Heath and Travis Ranch. A very small section extends to Collin County.

For the 2022–23 school year, the district was rated by the Texas Education Agency as follows: 88 (B) overall, 88 (B) for Student Achievement, 83 (B) for School Progress, and 89 (B) for Closing the Gaps.

== Schools ==
Schools that belong in multiple categories will be shown in multiple categories.

=== High schools ===
- Grades 9-12
  - Rockwall High School
  - Rockwall-Heath High School
  - Rockwall High School Freshman Center
  - Rockwall-Heath High School Freshman Center
  - Pioneer Technology & Arts Academy Middle and High School

=== Middle schools ===
- Grades 7-8
  - Maurine Cain Middle
  - J.W. Williams Middle
  - Herman E. Utley Middle
  - Ursula R. Middle school
  - Pioneer Technology & Arts Academy Middle and High School

=== Elementary schools ===
- Grades PK-6
  - Amanda Rochell Elementary
  - Amy Parks-Heath Elementary
  - Billie Stevenson Elementary (2013)
  - Celia Hays Elementary (2007)
  - Cullins-Lake Pointe Elementary (1988)
  - Dorothy Smith Pullen Elementary (1998)
  - Dorris A. Jones Elementary
  - Grace Hartman Elementary
  - Howard Dobbs Elementary
  - Linda Lyon Elementary
  - Lupe Garcia Elementary
  - Nebbie Williams Elementary
  - Ouida Springer Elementary
  - Sharon Shannon Elementary (2007)
  - Sherry and Paul Hamm Elementary (2020)
  - Virginia Reinhardt Elementary (1985)

=== New Schools Under Construction ===
Because Rockwall is one of the fastest-growing communities in the US, Rockwall is planning for constructions of more schools.

- In February 2006, Rockwall Independent School District decided to build two more elementary schools at a cost of $31,366,862.
- In addition, land acquisition in the amount of $4,830,996 for 5 new elementary sites and 1 new middle school site has begun.

Rockwall ISD District Construction
