= Heath, Texas =

- City
- Location of Heath in Rockwall County, Texas
- Coordinates: 32°50′52″N 96°28′42″W
- Country: United States
- State: Texas
- County: Rockwall, Kaufman

Area
  - Total: 12.25 sq mi (31.73 km^{2})
  - Land: 12.08 sq mi (31.29 km^{2})
  - Water: 0.17 sq mi (0.44 km^{2})
- Elevation: 502 ft (153 m)

Population (2020)
  - Total: 9,769
  - Density: 808.6/sq mi (312.2/km^{2})
- Time zone: UTC-6 (CST)
  - Summer (DST): UTC-5 (CDT)
- ZIP code: 75032
- Area codes: 214. 469, 945, 972
- FIPS code: 48-32984
- GNIS feature ID: 2410729
- Website: www.heathtx.com

Heath is a city in Rockwall and Kaufman counties, Texas, United States. The population was 9,769 at the 2020 census, up from 6,921 at the 2010 census. It is part of the Dallas–Fort Worth metroplex.

== History ==
Heath, Texas, is a city in southwestern Rockwall County, Texas, located along Farm Road 740, approximately seven miles south of Rockwall. The community was named after John O. Heath, one of the area’s earliest settlers in 1846. Originally known as Black Hill due to its dark soil, the settlement established the first post office in what is now Rockwall County in 1849. After the post office moved to Rockwall in 1854, the community was renamed Willow Springs until 1886, when it became Heath and briefly regained a post office, which operated until 1906.

Heath developed slowly in the late 19th and early 20th centuries, supported by agriculture and small local businesses. By 1904 the population had reached approximately 225, and the Heath Independent School District had been established. A fire in 1916 destroyed several buildings and contributed to a prolonged decline, which was exacerbated by the Great Depression. By 1950 the population had fallen to about 50, and the local school closed after merging with the Rockwall school district.

Growth resumed after mid-century due to suburban expansion from nearby Rockwall and the Dallas area, as well as the development of Lake Ray Hubbard in 1969–1970. Heath was incorporated in 1959, and its population increased steadily—from 175 in 1960 to over 4,100 by 2000. While some agricultural activity persisted into the late 20th century, Heath increasingly evolved into a residential community with a growing business and professional presence.

A proposition was placed on the November 4, 2008, ballot that, if passed, would have changed the name from "City of Heath" to "Village of Heath". Of the 3,511 votes cast, 2,069 (58.9%) voted against the measure while 1,442 (41.1%) voted in favor.

== Geography ==
Heath is located in southwestern Rockwall County. A small portion of the city—0.31 square miles (0.79 km^{2})—extends south into Kaufman County. According to the United States Census Bureau, the city has a total area of 10.7 square miles (27.7 km^{2}), of which 10.56 square miles (27.36 km^{2}) are land and 0.14 square miles (0.35 km^{2}), or 1.27%, are water.

Heath is bordered to the north by the city of Rockwall, to the south by the city of Forney and to the west by Lake Ray Hubbard, part of the city of Dallas. By road it is 25 miles (40 km) east of downtown Dallas.

== Demographics ==
Historical population
Census	Pop.	Note	%±
1970	520		—
1980	1,459		180.6%
1990	2,108		44.5%
2000	4,149		96.8%
2010	6,921		66.8%
2020	9,769		41.2%
2023 (est.)	11,238		15.0%
U.S. Decennial Census

=== 2020 census ===
As of the 2020 census, Heath had a population of 9,769, 3,313 households, and 2,736 families. The median age was 44.4 years. 25.8% of residents were under the age of 18 and 16.8% of residents were 65 years of age or older. For every 100 females there were 97.1 males, and for every 100 females age 18 and over there were 96.1 males age 18 and over.

92.0% of residents lived in urban areas, while 8.0% lived in rural areas.

There were 3,313 households in Heath, of which 40.2% had children under the age of 18 living in them. Of all households, 78.9% were married-couple households, 7.3% were households with a male householder and no spouse or partner present, and 11.3% were households with a female householder and no spouse or partner present. About 10.6% of all households were made up of individuals and 6.4% had someone living alone who was 65 years of age or older.

There were 3,488 housing units, of which 5.0% were vacant. The homeowner vacancy rate was 3.0% and the rental vacancy rate was 0.5%.

Racial composition as of the 2020 census
Race	Number	Percent
White	8,012	82.0%
Black or African American	390	4.0%
American Indian and Alaska Native	69	0.7%
Asian	261	2.7%
Native Hawaiian and Other Pacific Islander	4	0.0%
Some other race	203	2.1%
Two or more races	830	8.5%
Hispanic or Latino (of any race)	832	8.5%

== Education ==
Heath is a part of the Rockwall Independent School District. The city is served by Dorothy Smith Pullen Elementary School, Amy Parks-Heath Elementary School, Linda Lyon Elementary School, Maurine Cain Middle School, and Rockwall Heath High School.
