= Rockwall, Texas =

- City
- City of Rockwall
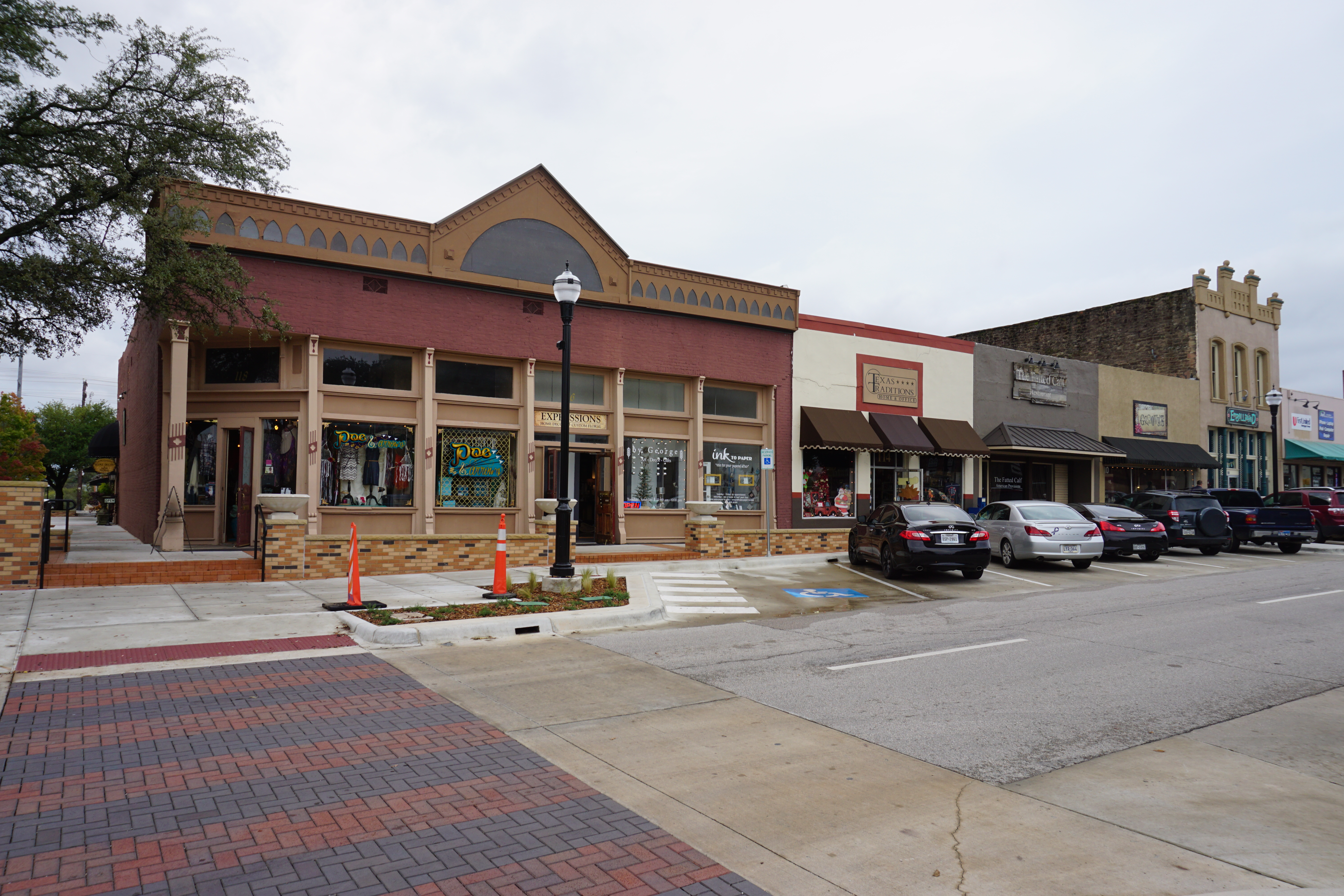
- Rusk Street in Rockwall

- Logo

- Location of Rockwall in Rockwall County, Texas
- Coordinates: 32°55′01″N 96°26′15″W
- Country: United States
- State: Texas
- County: Rockwall

Government
  - Type: Council-Manager
  - City Council: Mayor: Trace Johannesen; Mayor Pro Tem: Anna Campbell; Tim McCallum; Mark Moeller; Clarence Jorif; Sedric Thomas; Dennis Lewis
  - City Manager: Mary Smith

Area
  - Total: 29.97 sq mi (77.62 km^{2})
  - Land: 29.47 sq mi (76.33 km^{2})
  - Water: 0.50 sq mi (1.29 km^{2}) 1.63%
- Elevation: 561 ft (171 m)

Population (2020)
  - Total: 47,251
  - Density: 1,603/sq mi (619.0/km^{2})
- Demonym(s): Rockwaller, Rockwallite, Rockwallian
- Time zone: UTC-6 (CST)
  - Summer (DST): UTC-5 (CDT)
- ZIP codes: 75032; 75087
- Area codes: 214, 469, 945, 972
- FIPS code: 48-62828
- GNIS feature ID: 2410982
- Website: www.rockwall.com

Rockwall is a city in the U.S. state of Texas and the county seat of Rockwall County. The U.S. Census Bureau estimates that as of 2023, Rockwall's population is 52,918, up from 47,251 in the 2020 census. The name Rockwall is derived from a naturally jointed geological formation, which has the appearance of an artificial wall.

== History ==
The association of Paleo-Indian artifacts with extinct Pleistocene mammal remains in various archaeological sites within the Texas Prairie-Savannah Region of eastern North Central Texas, including a site in Collin County, and Clovis points recovered from the Brushy Creek Clovis Site in Hunt County demonstrates that the Rockwall region was occupied by prehistoric Native American cultures at least as far back as 13,500 to 13,000 years ago. More recently, the Rockwall region was occupied by Caddo Indians. Creek Indians moved to the area in the early 19th century. In 1925, Byron Khun de Prorok claimed that the wall was built by a prehistoric race, though this has been widely dismissed .

In 1851, the first Anglo-American settlers moved to the area, and wells were dug. During the digging, they found large underground rock walls that were initially believed to be man-made. Later study of the wall-like features by geologists and archaeologists found them to be jointed, natural sandstone dikes that had intruded Cretaceous marl. The wall, when viewed from above, runs in long straight lines with angles that form a near perfect rectangle. The eastern wall has several deviations that run in straight lines with sharp angles, which would be unusual for a natural formation in an already unusual closed loop wall formation.

The town was established April 17, 1854 and named after these natural rock walls. While originally part of Kaufman County, in 1873, Rockwall County was formed with Rockwall being the county seat.

== Geography ==
According to the United States Census Bureau, the city has a total area of 31.6 square miles (82 km^{2}), of which 22.3 square miles (58 km^{2}) is land and 0.4 square miles (1.0 km^{2}) (1.63%) is water.

Rockwall is on the eastern shore of Lake Ray Hubbard, approximately 20 miles northeast of Dallas. It is on state highways 205, 66 and 276, north of Interstate 30.

=== Climate ===
The climate in this area is characterized by hot, humid summers and generally mild to cool winters. According to the Köppen Climate Classification system, Rockwall has a humid subtropical climate, abbreviated "Cfa" on climate maps.

== Demographics ==
Historical population
Census	Pop.	Note	%±
1880	215		—
1890	843		292.1%
1900	1,245		47.7%
1910	1,136		−8.8%
1920	1,388		22.2%
1930	1,074		−22.6%
1940	1,318		22.7%
1950	1,501		13.9%
1960	2,166		44.3%
1970	3,121		44.1%
1980	5,939		90.3%
1990	10,486		76.6%
2000	17,976		71.4%
2010	37,490		108.6%
2020	47,251		26.0%
2024 (est.)	53,547		13.3%
U.S. Decennial Census

=== 2020 census ===
As of the 2020 census, there were 47,251 people, 16,798 households, and 12,771 families residing in the city. The median age was 39.3 years, with 25.8% of residents under the age of 18 and 15.2% 65 years of age or older. For every 100 females there were 95.0 males, and for every 100 females age 18 and over there were 91.7 males age 18 and over.

97.9% of residents lived in urban areas, while 2.1% lived in rural areas.

There were 16,798 households in Rockwall, of which 38.6% had children under the age of 18 living in them. Of all households, 60.8% were married-couple households, 12.1% were households with a male householder and no spouse or partner present, and 23.0% were households with a female householder and no spouse or partner present. About 20.9% of all households were made up of individuals and 10.2% had someone living alone who was 65 years of age or older.

There were 17,772 housing units, of which 5.5% were vacant. The homeowner vacancy rate was 2.3% and the rental vacancy rate was 8.1%.

Racial composition as of the 2020 census
Race	Number	Percent
White	32,682	69.2%
Black or African American	3,808	8.1%
American Indian and Alaska Native	385	0.8%
Asian	1,739	3.7%
Native Hawaiian and Other Pacific Islander	49	0.1%
Some other race	2,830	6.0%
Two or more races	5,758	12.2%
Hispanic or Latino (of any race)	8,649	18.3%

== Government ==
=== Local government ===
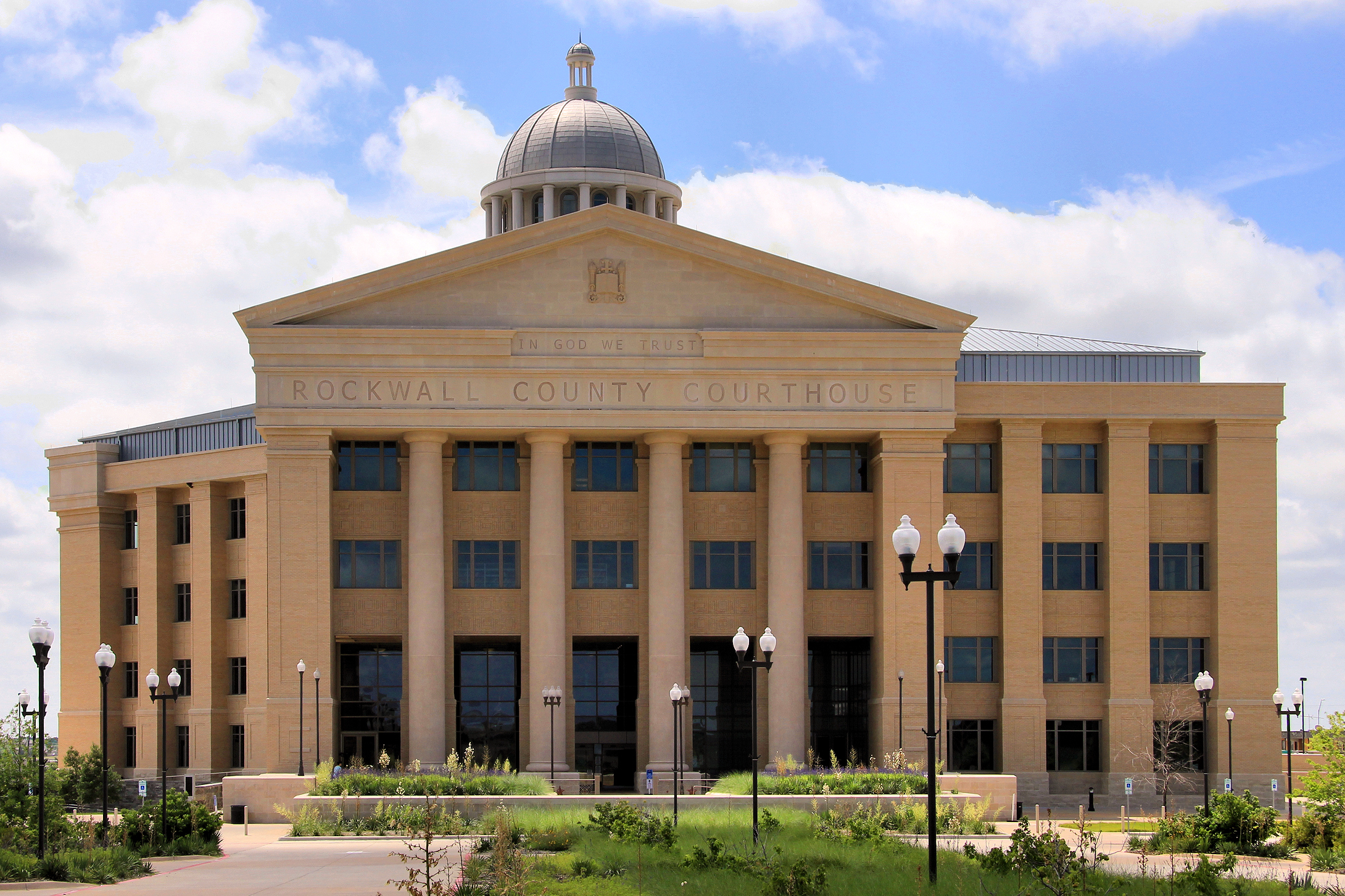
The Rockwall County Courthouse in Rockwall

According to the city's 2009 Comprehensive Annual Financial Report Fund Financial Statements, the city's various funds had $39.0 million in revenues, $42.2 million in expenditures, $32.3 million in total assets, $3.6 million in total liabilities, and $25.9 million in investments.

The structure of the management and coordination of city services is:

Department	Director
City Manager	Mary Smith
Assistant City Manager	Joey Boyd
Director of Public Works/City Engineer	Amy Williams, PE
Director of Parks and Recreation	Travis Sales, MCPTM
Chief of Police	Ed Fowler
Fire Chief	Kenneth Cullins
Director of Planning	Ryan Miller, AICP

The city of Rockwall is a voluntary member of the North Central Texas Council of Governments association, the purpose of which is to coordinate individual and collective local governments and facilitate regional solutions, eliminate unnecessary duplication, and enable joint decisions.

=== State government ===
Rockwall is represented in the Texas Senate by Republican Bob Hall, District 2, and in the Texas House of Representatives by Republican Justin Holland, House District 33.

=== Federal government ===
At the federal level, the two U.S. senators from Texas are Republicans John Cornyn and Ted Cruz; Rockwall is part of Texas's 4th congressional district, which is currently represented by Republican Pat Fallon.

== Education ==
=== Public schools ===
The city is served by the Rockwall Independent School District. There are two public high schools in Rockwall: Rockwall High School and Rockwall-Heath High School. There are sixteen elementary schools and four middle schools in Rockwall.

=== Higher education ===
The city is home to the Higher Education Center at Rockwall, which is part of the community college district, Collin College. The campus is the District's first campus outside of Collin County itself. Texas A&M University-Commerce holds classes at the center.

== Transportation ==
Rockwall is served by the following highways that run through the city:

- Interstate 30
- U.S. Highway 67 (runs concurrent with Interstate 30)
- State Highway 66
- State Highway 205
- State Highway 276
- Farm to Market 549
- Farm to Market 552
- Farm to Market 740
- Farm to Market 3549
- Farm to Market 1141
- Farm to Market 1139
- Farm to Market 740 (Ridge Road)
- Farm to Market 3097
- Farm to Market 550

Ralph M. Hall/Rockwall Municipal Airport is located two miles east of the city center and is used mostly by small general aviation aircraft.

The Dallas and Greenville Railway (which was quickly acquired by the Missouri–Kansas–Texas Railroad) originally served Rockwall. The Dallas, Garland and Northeastern Railroad currently leases the line from Katy successor Union Pacific.

== Sports ==
Rockwall offers many different sports complexes as well as activities. Airport Road boasts baseball fields, as well as the Landing Point complex containing the Texas International Fencing Center, zipline and dance facilities. The Rockwall Indoor Sports Expo is located on South 205. Lake Ray Hubbard has several boating marinas and is used for jet skiing.

Rockwall also offers 2 different Golf Courses within 17 miles of the center of Rockwall.

== Notable people ==
- Dan Bartlett, former Counselor to the President
- Jason Castro, top 12 contestant on season 7 of American Idol
- Joe Driver, Texas State Representative from 1993 to 2013
- Zack Eskridge, former CFL quarterback
- Allie Gonino, singer, actress, and violinist who played Laurel Mercer in The Lying Game
- Ralph Hall, member of US House of Representatives
- Cliff Harris, professional football safety who played for the Dallas Cowboys
- Alex Jones, conservative radio show host and conspiracy theorist
- Roger Kieschnick, former outfielder for Arizona Diamondbacks
- Kendial Lawrence, former CFL running back
- Larry Lea, former televangelist whose ministry was based in Rockwall during the 1980s and early 1990s
- Carlton Massey, defensive lineman for Cleveland Browns
- James McSweeney, retired UFC fighter
- Mason Musso, lead singer and guitarist in Metro Station
- Mitchel Musso, actor and singer
- Anfernee Orji, linebacker for New Orleans Saints
- Marina Oswald Porter, widow of Lee Harvey Oswald
- William Hubbel Price, Texas Legislator
- Amar Sandhu, first American-born Punjabi singer
- Jaxon Smith-Njigba, NFL wide receiver for the Seattle Seahawks
- Andy Tanner, former wide receiver for the New Orleans Saints
- Travis Tedford, former child actor best known for portraying Spanky McFarland in the 1994 feature film The Little Rascals
