= Texas's 33rd House of Representatives district =

Texan legislative district

Texas's 33rd State House of Representatives district
Representative
Katrina Pierson; R

The 33rd district of the Texas House of Representatives consists of Rockwall County and a portion of southern Collin County. The current representative is Justin Holland, who has represented the district since 2017. Katrina Pierson won election in the general election for Texas House of Representatives District 33 on November 5, 2024.
