= Art & Antiques =

American arts magazine

- May 2009 cover of Art & Antiques
- Editor: David Masello
- Categories: Art magazine
- Frequency: 10 per year
- Founder: Wick Allison
- First issue: March 1984
- Company: Art & Antiques Worldwide Media
- Country: United States
- Based in: 1319-cc Military Cutoff Road #192, Wilmington, North Carolina 28405 — Tel: 910.679.4402
- Language: English
- Website: artandantiquesmag.com
- ISSN: 0195-8208

Art & Antiques is an American arts magazine.

== History ==
=== 1984 launch ===
Art & Antiques launched its premier issue in March 1984. While the magazine disclaimed any connection to a previous publication of the same name, the company had in fact bought the rights from a previous magazine produced in the late 1970s and early 1980s. That magazine began as American Art & Antiques, later shortening its name to simply Art & Antiques.

The new Art & Antiques was founded and published by Wick Allison, who had previously founded D Magazine, a city magazine devoted to Dallas, Texas. A major investor in Allison's magazine was an insurance company, the Mutual Benefit Life Insurance Company, which viewed the magazine as a prestigious publication and an asset to the firm's reputation.

The magazine's founding editor was Isolde Motley, former editor of Art+Auction, who went on to join Martha Stewart's publishing empire. Motley later served as corporate editor at Time Inc. Jeff Schaire became the next editor of Art & Antiques in 1986.

Initially Art & Antiques was an oversized publication. The publishers switched to a standard format due to the high publishing and shipping costs.

=== Early publicity ===
Under editor Jeff Schaire, Art & Antiques published two stories that earned a great deal of publicity in the mainstream media. One of these, by artist and computer technician Lillian F. Schwartz, in the January 1987 issue, explored whether Leonardo da Vinci's Mona Lisa actually depicted the artist himself, and purported to produce scientific evidence to support the theory.

But the magazine's greatest publicity coup was Schaire's story on Andrew Wyeth's so-called Helga paintings, hitherto unknown nude portraits that landed the discovery on the covers of both Time and Newsweek, having raised the implication that artist and subject were in an intimate relationship documented, and the possibility of a large body of as-yet-unknown Wyeth masterpieces.

=== 1980s–1990s ===
In the early 1990s, Allison brought in Michael Pashby to take over duties as publisher. Pashby had previous done extensive work with Meredith Publications. Today he is the Executive Vice President/General Manager of Magazine Publishers of America, a trade organization.

Under Allison, the magazine was based at the Simon Dezer Building, 87-89 Fifth Avenue. The historic structure, on lower Fifth Avenue, was built in the early 1900s.

Under the owner who bought it from Allison, Art & Antiques moved for a period to an Art Deco skyscraper on Third Avenue.

The character of the magazine was largely shaped by founding editor Isolde Motley and later Jeffrey Schaire, who attempted to bring to the magazine a mixture of high art and popular culture, with articles not just on major artists, but also on pinball machines and inexpensive collectibles, items more accessible for a wider audience.

The magazine's prominence in the late 1980s and early 1990s was reflected in a 1991 case of theft at the Macklowe Gallery, a dealer in Tiffany lamps, jewelry, and antiques, especially items in the Art Nouveau style. At the close of the business day, a robber was able to gain access to the gallery on upper Madison Avenue simply by claiming to be a bike messenger with a parcel from Art & Antiques and was able to abscond with about $80,000.00 worth of jewelry. In fact, the magazine did not have any relationship with the gallery at that time.

In his contemporary commentary on the period, the writer Tom Wolfe saw Art & Antiques and other publications as part of what he called a "plutographic" movement. The Spring, 1989, issue of the Grinnell Magazine, a publication of Grinnell College, transcribed a speech Wolfe had given at the school in which he said the following:

Pornography is the graphic depiction of the acts of prostitutes. Plutography is the graphic depiction of the acts of the rich. Why else do you think people subscribe to magazines like House and Garden, Architectural Digest, Town and Country, Connoisseur, Art and Antiques? Suppose that you are being given tips about design, connoisseurship and all these things; obviously it's really just so that you can look plutographically at the lives of the rich. And, you notice, these magazines are becoming the wealthy magazines of today.

In the 1990 book Conversations With Tom Wolfe, the writer elaborated:

Pornography was the great vice of the 1970s; plutography—the graphic depiction of the acts of the rich—is the great vice of the 1980s. Now that Playboy and Penthouse are on the skids financially, what rises in their place? House & Garden, Architectural Digest, Town & Country, Art & Antiques, Connoisseur. And there's a new one called Millionaire—I love that.

=== Late 1990s to 2010 ===
After Allison sold Allison Publications, the publisher of Art & Antiques, the magazine went through various owners

From the late 1990s, the magazine was based in Atlanta, Georgia, the headquarters of parent company Trans World Publishing, Inc., until the publication was sold in 2006 to CurtCo Media. Other magazines owned by CurtCo Media include San Diego Magazine, Robb Report, Sarasota, and Gulfshore Life. CurtCo sold off most of its magazines, including Art & Antiques, in 2010.

=== Since 2010 ===
Phillip Troy Linger, former publisher of Los Angeles–based Brentwood Magazine, purchased Art & Antiques magazine in April 2010.

== Special issues ==
=== 100 Top Collectors ===
Under founding editor Jeffrey Schaire, Art & Antiques began a tradition of publishing an annual issue devoted to the "100 Top Collectors." This was one of the first compendiums of its kind, although similar articles had appeared in Connoisseur under editor Thomas Hoving, and would later appear in Art+Auction and other art-world publications.

The annual issue was both famous and infamous in the art world. Schaire did not simply choose major collectors, but tried to focus on both those rich people who had done a lot in the last year, as well as smaller collectors who, although not of immense wealth, brought an interesting focus to their collecting, specializing in off-beat art, antiques, and collectibles.

== Writers ==
Notable writers have included Hilton Kramer, former art critic for The New York Times, and authors such as John Updike, Françoise Gilot, and Hugh Kenner. In the 1980s and early 1990s, editor Jeffrey Schaire strived to bring in notable authors, in the hope that the magazine would be unpretentious and interesting for a general audience.

In the same spirit, Schaire tried to bring in celebrity authors to bring in their own thoughts and remembrances of art-related subjects. These authors included notables such as the actress Helen Hayes.
