= People Newspapers =

People Newspapers is a Dallas, Texas-based publisher of two award-winning monthly community newspapers, Park Cities People and Preston Hollow People. The two papers mail to a combined 43,700 homes and businesses in the Park Cities, Preston Hollow, Turtle Creek, Bluffview, Devonshire, and Greenway Parks neighborhoods.

The publisher began in 1981 with the weekly newspaper Park Cities People. The newspaper was founded by Reid Slaughter and Kirk Dooley, to cover the Park Cities enclave of Highland Park and University Park.

In 1989, the company began to publish a second paper, North Dallas People, which was distributed free of charge in additional affluent neighborhoods. Following the 2003 purchase of the company by D Magazine founder Wick Allison, the company created eight additional niche papers covering similar communities:

- Bent Tree People
- Bluffview People
- Lake Highlands People
- Lakewood People
- Oak Cliff People
- Preston Hollow People
- Turtle Creek People
- West Plano People

The new parent company, City Newspapers, L.P., bought the paper Northside People at the same time as the People Newspapers acquisition and announced the discontinuation of North Dallas People when the eight new papers were established.

By 2012, the publisher had narrowed its weekly publications down to its flagship paper Park Cities People, and Preston Hollow People and Oak Cliff People. In 2014, the company switched to publishing monthly and launched the redesigned tabloid sized versions of Park Cities People and Preston Hollow People, dropping the Oak Cliff paper.
