= Devonshire, Dallas =

Coordinates: 32.858°N 96.817°W

Devonshire
- Neighborhood
- Interactive map of Devonshire
- Country: United States
- State: Texas
- County: Dallas
- City: Dallas
- Area: North Dallas

Area
  - Land: 0.50 sq mi (1.3 km^{2})
- Elevation: 551 ft (168 m)
- Time zone: UTC−6 (Central)
  - Summer (DST): UTC−5 (Central)
- ZIP Code: 75209
- Area codes: 214, 469, 972
- Website: Devonshire Neighborhood Association

Devonshire is a neighborhood in north Dallas, Texas (USA), bounded by Northwest Highway (Loop 12) and Preston Hollow on the north, the Dallas North Tollway, Preston Center and University Park on the east, Lovers Lane and Inwood Village on the south, and Inwood Road and the Bluffview neighborhood on the west.

== Education ==
=== Public schools ===
The neighborhood is served by the Dallas Independent School District for public schools.

Children within the neighborhood are served by:

- K. B. Polk Center for Academically Talented and Gifted (Pre-K through fifth grade) in neighboring Elm Thicket/Northpark neighborhood
- Edward H Cary Middle School (6-8) in Walnut Hill neighborhood
- Thomas Jefferson High School (9-12) in Walnut Hill neighborhood

Sudie L. Williams Talented and Gifted Academy (located next door in the Bluffview neighborhood) serves academically talented and gifted students in grades four through six (expanding to eighth grade by 2020). Admission to Williams is based on academic achievement and an application is required.

Henry W. Longfellow Career Exploration Academy (located next door in the Greenway Parks neighborhood) serves students in grades 6-8 selected through the magnet process. The students receive the same basic middle school program offered in all Dallas Independent School District middle schools. However, special focus is placed on the exploration and development of each student's interests and abilities.

=== Private schools ===
Nearby private schools include Good Shepherd Episcopal School (PreK-8), St. Mark's School of Texas (1-12), The Hockaday School (PreK-12, Girls), Greenhill School (PreK-12), The Episcopal School of Dallas (PreK-12), Jesuit College Preparatory School of Dallas (9-12, Boys), The Lamplighter School (PreK-4), Ursuline Academy of Dallas (9-12, Girls), and Christ the King Catholic School (K-8).

=== Colleges and universities ===
Devonshire is in the Dallas County Community College District, which offers academic, continuing education, and adult education programs through seven community colleges and 14 campuses in Dallas County.

== Religion ==
Many houses of worship are nearby including: Cochran Chapel United Methodist Church, The Church of Jesus Christ of Latter-Day Saints, Lovers Lane United Methodist Church, Fifth Church of Christ, Scientist, Northwest Bible Church, Saint Michael and All Angels Episcopal Church, Christ the King Catholic Church, Congregation Shearith Israel, Temple Emanu-El, and Park Cities Baptist Church.

== Government ==
- Dallas City Council: District 13: Councilmember: Jennifer Staubach Gates
- Dallas County Commissioners Court: Precinct 2: Mike Cantrell
- Texas State Representative: House District 108: Morgan Meyer
- Texas State Senator: District 16: Don Huffines
- Texas U.S. Representative District 32: Colin Allred
- Texas U.S. Senators: John Cornyn and Ted Cruz
- Texas State Board of Education: District 12 Member: Pam Little

Last updated: January 5, 2019; 7 years ago
