= Bachman, Texas =

Former community in Texas, US

Bachman is a former community in Dallas County, Texas, United States. It is situated on Texas State Highway Loop 12, Interstate 35 and Texas State Highway 354. The community is between two land grants, and is named for Bachman Branch, which in turn is named for two families two settled in Bachman in 1845. Since its damming in 1903, it has bordered Bachman Lake. The town later became a park.
