= Sport (American magazine) =

Former American sports magazine

- First cover of Sport, September 1946, featuring Joe DiMaggio
- Categories: Sports magazine
- Frequency: Monthly
- First issue: September 1946; 80 years ago
- Final issue: August 2000; 26 years ago
- Country: United States
- Based in: New York City
- Language: English
- Website: sportthemagazine.com
- ISSN: 0038-7797

Sport was an American sports magazine. Launched in September 1946 by New York–based publisher Macfadden Publications, Sport pioneered the generous use of color photography— it carried eight full-color plates in its first edition. Sport predated the launch of Sports Illustrated by eight years, and was responsible for bringing several editorial innovations to the genre. Sport differed from Sports Illustrated in that the former was a monthly magazine, while the latter had a weekly distribution.

The Sport Magazine Award, created in 1948, was initially given to outstanding players in 11 major sports. In 1955, the magazine instituted an award honoring the outstanding player in baseball's World Series, which became the World Series Most Valuable Player Award and continues to be awarded by Major League Baseball. Later, Sport expanded this approach to recognize pre-eminent postseason performers in the four major professional sports leagues in the United States and Canada.

Sport was published continually between its launch and August 2000, when its then-owner, British publisher EMAP PLC, made the decision to close the money-losing title. As of 2016, the photo archive of Sport, a collection of 20th-century sports photography in North America, is housed in Canada in Toronto, Ontario, and Vancouver, British Columbia, at The Sport Gallery.

== History ==
=== 1946–1960s ===
For many of the middle years of the 20th century, the king of sport magazines in North America was not Time Inc.'s Sports Illustrated, but the brainchild of another publishing house, Macfadden Publications, founded by publisher and fitness authority Bernarr Macfadden. Launched in September 1946, Macfadden's Sport magazine broke new ground, as the first mainstream national sports publication, but also in its editorial innovations. In those years, Sport had the market for magazine-style sports journalism virtually to itself and, under founding editor Ernest Heyn, pioneered a brand of behind-the-scenes glimpses of the heroes of the day not previously attempted. The emphasis was not on the games or the teams, but on the elements of human drama that lay beneath. Sport was an icon in the league of LIFE, Look and The Saturday Evening Post.

Many of the magazine's editorial innovations—such as its Sporttalk digest of short items at the front of the magazine, the Sport special long feature at the back and, in particular, the use of full-page colour portraits of the stars of the day—were later borrowed by the new kid on the block, SI, when it made its debut as a weekly in 1954. In fact, Time Inc., tried to purchase the name "Sport", but the company's final offer of $200,000 fell on deaf ears at Macfadden, who would have sold for $50,000 more, so Time Inc. went instead with Sports Illustrated, trademarking a name used by two previous failed sports journals, and which had lapsed into public domain.

==== Notable writers for Sport ====
From its launch in September 1946, with Joe DiMaggio gracing the inaugural cover, Sport magazine thrived due to a lack of competitors; rival The Sporting News then being a weekly newspaper printed on newsprint. Each month its pages were filled with writing by the likes of Grantland Rice, John Lardner, Dan Daniel, Roger Kahn and the magazine's editor, Dick Schaap, plus photographs by stars as Ozzie Sweet, George Heyer, Marvin Newman, Hy Peskin and Martin Blumenthal. It continued to thrive for a quarter-century or so, as SI struggled to reach profitability, and to find the right blend of spectator and participatory sports.

Ogden Nash wrote his baseball poem "Line-Up for Yesterday" for the magazine in 1949.

==== The Sport Award ====
Representative of Sport magazine's stature, in the hearts and minds of the reading public, but also of the men who ran the leagues and teams across North America, was the magazine's success in establishing the Sport Award in 1955 for the most valuable player in the World Series. The concept was expanded over the years until a Sport magazine award was presented to the outstanding postseason performer in each of the four major professional sports leagues in the United States and Canada, as sanctioned by the leagues.

=== 1970s–2000 ===
But by the early 1970s, Macfadden, lacking Time's deep pockets, was fading, and Sport eventually wound up in the hands of Downe Communications. In 1976, Downe and its family of magazines that included Ladies Home Journal and Redbook, was acquired by The Charter Company. Under Downe and Charter, there was a zig-zag in editorial direction, and gradually Sport lost its way, its distinctive voice, and circulation declined. In 1980, Sport was purchased from the Charter Company by its VP of Corporate and Investor Relations, Park Beeler, through an entity known as MVP Sports. Beeler quickly restructured the personnel of Sport and named Don Hanrahan, a former publisher under Downe, to return to that role. Beeler and Hanrahan immediately implemented a strategic plan of editorial and circulation repositioning with a return to a "sports in depth" theme as opposed to attempts to cover sports news. Beeler and Hanrahan also solidified Sport's historic role of awarding of the MVP Awards for the Super Bowl, World Series, Stanley Cup, and NBA Championship Series. Circulation practices were improved and re-validated. This quickly revived the magazine and its advertising base. Beeler then sold MVP Sports to Raymond Hunt of Dallas, who integrated it into his existing publishing enterprises, Southwest Media, which included the very successful D magazine, which was headed by Wick Allison. Allison brought in David Bauer (then–deputy managing editor of Sports Illustrated) as editor. Under Hanrahan as publisher and Bauer as editor, Sport sharply improved its design and editorial content under the "sports in depth" theme, and the magazine became profitable for the first time in years. Hanrahan, Allison and Bauer all moved on to other projects after a few years. The magazine was sold by Ray Hunt to Petersen Publishing Company in 1988. Petersen Publishing continued to publish Sport as a monthly magazine out of its Los Angeles offices. In 1997, Sport was relaunched by media industry veterans and new Petersen Publishing Company owners/operators Jim Dunning, Neal Vitale and Claeys Bahrenburg (known for his successful tenure at Hearst). They moved the magazine back to New York City from Los Angeles, and hired Norb Garrett as Editor-in-Chief. Garrett, who formerly had served as Editor-in-Chief at the start-up College Sports magazine, assumed the mantle from LA-based EIC Cam Benty, and hired a new team in New York City and, along with new President Polly Perkins, led an aggressive editorial overhaul of the brand. Art director Anthony D’Elia was hired from Hearst, and his team developed a new, modern logo and design aesthetic for the magazine (new logo debuted in October 1997 issue). Key editorial hires included Managing Editor John Roach, Photo Editor Grace How, Associate Editor Scott Burton (ESPN), Copy Chief Steve Gordon (ESPN) and staff writers Darryl Howerton and Dave Scott (ESPN). From 1997 to 2000, Sport's editorial team launched numerous innovative platforms, including the Heroes of Sport (honoring athletes and their humanitarian efforts), Bargains and Bandits (An annual list of the best and worst contract deals in sports) and Dominators and Abominators of Sport (The best and worst of athletics), which was an annual one-hour TV show on CBS Sports. During that period, Sport editorial also launched the first recurring front-of-book photo gallery (“Impact”) in a consumer sports magazine and introduced “RAWSport”, a monthly look at some of the fledgling extreme sports. That coverage led Sport and Petersen to launch the extreme sports competition event with NBC Sports, “The Gravity Games,” which debuted in Providence, RI, in 1999. In June 1998, Petersen Publishing purchased Inside Sport magazine from Century Publishing and folded Inside Sport into Sport. The combined circulation exceeded 1 million subscribers. Sport's editorial team also produced several annual sports magazines, including “Dick Vitale’s College Basketball Yearbook” and “Bob Griese’s College Football Yearbook” as well as launched innovative fantasy baseball and football preview magazines as fantasy sports became more popular. Following the sale of Petersen Publishing to UK publisher EMAP in 1999, Garrett moved to California to run the company's Action Sports Group consisting of titles such as Surfer, Powder, Skateboarder and Bike, while Roach took over as Editor-in-Chief.

==== The end of Sport ====
In August 2000, after appearing every month for 54 years under 10 different owners, Sport magazine ceased publication following EMAP's decision to shutter the title.

Sport's shutdown came with some sadness. Allen Barra, writing in Salon, put it this way: "Though it didn't make any headlines, the news of the death of Sport magazine...must have put a lump in the throat of those old enough to remember the greatest of all American sports magazines...Sports Illustrated was great, but SI, in an era when you couldn't see all the highlights every night, was read for news; Sport was for reflection." And, in a rare departure for the competitive magazine industry, SI itself paid tribute to Sport on its own pages with a piece that began, "They closed the barbershop last week, the one in town, the first place – not counting school or a friend's house – where your mother would drop you off and leave you...".

In 2007, Sport was reestablished by Tom Ficara as a magazine with occasional printed special editions. Later that same year, the magazine ceased operations.

== The Sport Collection ==
Today, the archive of the magazine, comprising tens of thousands photographic images and illustrations, lives on, forming the base of The Sport Collection, which is housed in Toronto, Ontario, Canada, at The Sport Gallery. There is also a second location in Vancouver, British Columbia, Canada.

== Publishers ==
Dates	Publisher
1946–1961	Macfadden Publications
1961–1975	Bartell Publishing
1975–1976	Downe Communications
1978–1980	Charter Company
1980–1981	MVP Sports, Inc.
1981–1988	Southwest Media Corporation
1988–1998	Petersen Publishing
1998–2000	EMAP

== See also ==
- List of defunct American periodicals
