= Shannon Estates, Dallas =

Shannon Estates
- Neighborhood
- Nickname: The Bird Streets
- Country: United States
- State: Texas
- County: Dallas
- City: Dallas
- Area: North Dallas
- Elevation: 463 ft (141 m)
  - Density: 6,351/sq mi (2,452/km^{2})
- Time zone: UTC−6 (Central)
  - Summer (DST): UTC−5 (Central)
- ZIP Code: 75209
- Area codes: 214, 469, 972

Shannon Estates is a neighborhood in north Dallas, Texas (USA), and is wholly contained within the Elm Thicket/North Park neighborhood. It is bounded by Inwood Road on the east, Mockingbird Lane on the south, Kenwell Street on the west, and West University Boulevard on the north. It borders Greenway Parks to the east, Elm Thicket/North Park to the north and west, and Highland Place to the south. Within reach are Inwood Village, West Lovers Lane businesses, Lemmon Avenue businesses, as well as easy access via Mockingbird Lane to the Dallas North Tollway.

In the Spring of 2016, Elm Thicket/North Park, including Shannon Estates, was included in Dallas' Neighborhood Plus Plan. Adopted in 2015, Neighborhood Plus is a citywide neighborhood revitalization plan for the City of Dallas to alleviate poverty, fight blight, attract and retain the middle class, increase homeownership and enhance rental options.
