= Sudie L. Williams =

Sudie Lawrence Williams (November 11, 1872 – July 21, 1940) was a music educator in the public schools of Dallas, Texas. She was born in Bellville, Texas to Dr. and Mrs. Otis Laurence Williams. She began teaching in the Dallas schools in 1894, became assistant supervisor of music for the schools in 1910, acting supervisor in 1913 (the year the Dallas schools acquired their first phonograph), and supervisor in 1914.

She was awarded a Bachelor of Science degree by Chapel Hill College in 1915 and later studied at the University of Chicago, Cornell University, and the University of California.

She was a member of the board of the Dallas Symphony Society when in 1939 the board voted to dissolve the group over her protest. She organized a mass meeting and devoted herself to the cause of a new symphony. She succeeded and was known as the person who saved the Dallas Symphony.

Miss Williams, who never married, died at her home at 6831 Clayton in Dallas on July 21, 1940, and was buried in Oak Cliff Cemetery in Dallas. Her estate included a library of 525 books and pamphlets relating to music, which she gave to Southern Methodist University.

A newspaper article soon after her death explained her importance to the community: "Miss Sudie’s great work was to educate the masses to enjoy music, leaving the performance of music to the few who felt the call. She realized from the outset that music appreciation is merely a matter of overcoming the economic difficulty of musical presentation. She seized upon every device that might make more and more music. First it was the phonograph and then it was the radio with the boon of the Damrosch hour over NBC."

The Dallas Independent School District opened Sudie L. Williams Elementary School in the Bluffview area of North Dallas in 1952. It is now a TAG school with grades 4–8. The Sudie L. Williams Talented and Gifted Academy has four houses: Duma, Esempio, Sankofa, and Logra.
