= Love Field, Dallas =

Coordinates: 32.834°N 96.855°W

Love Field
- Nickname: LF
- Interactive map of Love Field
- Country: United States
- State: Texas
- Counties: Dallas
- City: Dallas
- Area: Northwest Dallas

Population
  - Total: 17,364
- ZIP Code: 75235
- Area codes: 214, 469, 972

Love Field is a neighborhood located in northwest Dallas, Texas. It lies southwest of and is adjacent to Dallas Love Field Airport and is bounded by Denton Drive, Inwood Road, Harry Hines Boulevard, and Webb Chapel Extension. The neighborhood takes its name from Love Field Airport.

== Economy ==
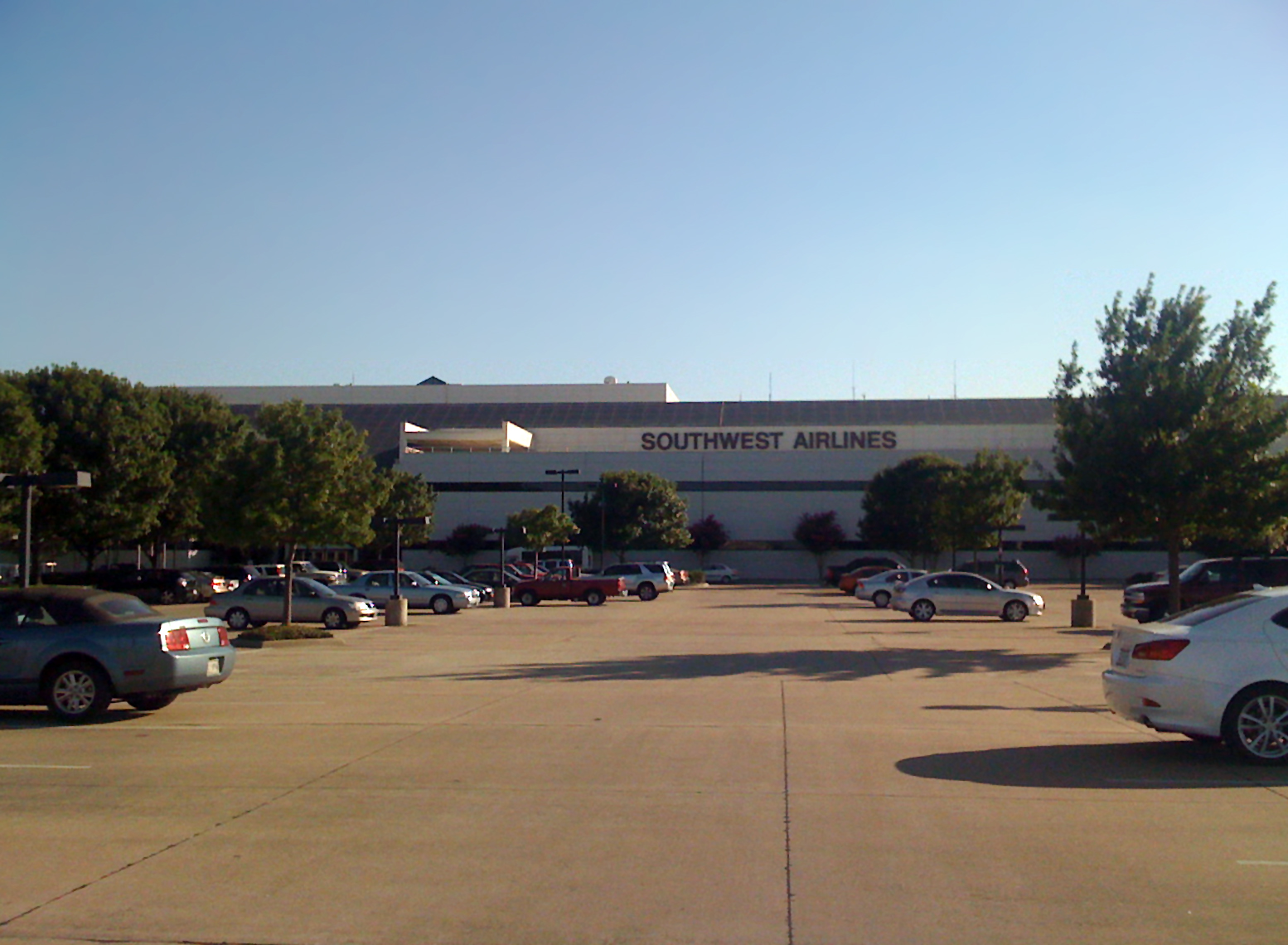
Southwest Airlines headquarters

The headquarters of Southwest Airlines are located at 2702 Love Field Drive, adjacent to the airport. Several other large manufacturing plants are in the neighborhood.

== Geography ==
The only body of water within Love Field is Bachman Lake. It lies between Northwest Highway and Dallas Love Field. The Trinity River has several runoffs.

== Education ==
=== Primary and secondary schools ===
==== Public schools ====
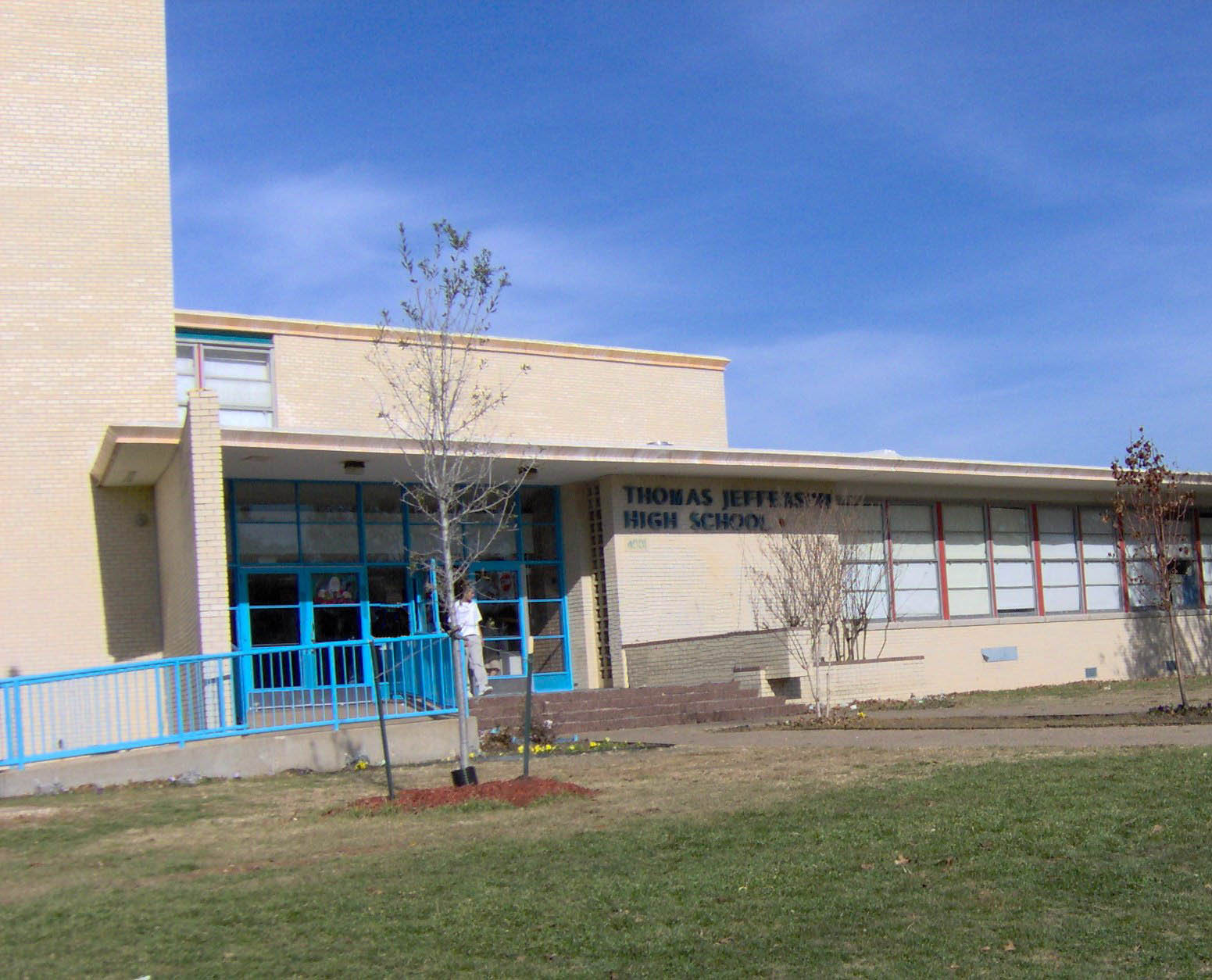
Thomas Jefferson High School

The Dallas Independent School District operates local public schools. The area is within the Board of Trustees District 8; as of 2008 Adam Medrano represents the district.

Obadiah Knight Elementary School, a public elementary school, is within Love Field. All residents zoned to Knight are also zoned to Thomas J. Rusk Middle School and Thomas Jefferson High School .

==== Private schools ====
Our Lady of Perpetual Help Catholic School is a Roman Catholic school of the Roman Catholic Diocese of Dallas. OLPH students range in age from Pre-K to eighth grade. OLPH is located across the street from Knight Elementary School.

== Crime ==
The Love Field area lies roughly within the Dallas Police Department beats 121–126, 131–135, 143, 145, 541, and 542.

On September 24, 2025 a terrorist attack occurred at the immigration detention facility in Love Field
