= Wick Allison =

American magazine publisher (1948–2020)

- Born: Lodowick Brodie Cobb Allison; March 17, 1948; Dallas, Texas, U.S.
- Died: September 1, 2020 (aged 72); Roscoe, New York, U.S.
- Education: University of Texas at Austin
- Occupations: Publisher, author
- Years active: 1974–2020
- Organization: People Newspapers
- Notable work: D Magazine
- Spouse: Christine Peterson (m. 1983)
- Children: 4

Lodowick Brodie Cobb "Wick" Allison (March 17, 1948 – September 1, 2020) was an American magazine publisher and author. He was the owner of D Magazine, a monthly magazine covering Dallas–Fort Worth, which he co-founded in 1974. He was also the principal owner of People Newspapers, which he purchased in 2003. He served as president of the non-profit American Ideas Institute, publisher of The American Conservative.

== Personal life ==
Allison was born in Dallas, Texas, on March 17, 1948. He was a sixth-generation Texan. He graduated from the University of Texas at Austin in 1971. He served as editor of the student humor magazine The Texas Ranger and earned a degree in American Studies. Upon graduation, he served in the White House on the President's Commission on Campus Unrest and subsequently joined the United States Army. He attended the Cox School of Business at Southern Methodist University, where he developed his business plan for D Magazine before dropping out.

Allison married Christine Peterson in 1983. Together, they had four daughters: Gillea, Maisie, Chrissie, and Loddie. Chrissie was born with Down syndrome; although doctors warned that she would need to be institutionalized, Allison and his wife insisted on taking her home.

Allison died on the night of September 1, 2020, at his home in Craigie Clair, in the Catskill Mountains. He was 72, and suffered from bladder cancer for more than a decade before his death.

== Career ==
=== Magazine publishing ===
Allison co-founded D Magazine – a monthly magazine covering Dallas – in 1974, with backing from Dallas investor Ray Lee Hunt. He and a group of investors purchased Sport Magazine in 1981, which they subsequently sold three years later. He proceeded to found and publish Art & Antiques in 1984. A year later, Allison was asked by William F. Buckley Jr. to join the board of directors of the National Review, and went on to become its publisher in 1988, succeeding William A. Rusher. In 1981 or 1982 Allison sold his company Allison Publications, publisher of Art & Antiques. He resigned as publisher of National Review in 1993. Two years later, he and investor Harlan Crow repurchased D Magazine, and in 2001, Allison bought out Crow to become the magazine company's sole owner. Allison edited a new edition of The Bible To Be Read As Living Literature, published by Simon & Schuster in 1993. He was also the author of That's In The Bible? (Random House, 2009) and co-author of Condemned To Repeat It (Viking Penguin, 1998).

In February 2013, Allison launched D: The Broadcast, a two-hour daily morning talk show, on local Dallas independent station KTXD, but the magazine ended its affiliation with the show in August of the same year.

== Political views ==
In September 2008, he published an article in D Magazine entitled "A Conservative For Obama", in which he endorsed then Senator Barack Obama for president. In May 2011, he recanted the endorsement citing "serial disillusionment" with the two major US political parties. However, in September 2012, Allison told The Daily Beast, "I will probably vote for Obama, unless I have a Gary Johnson-inspiration in the voting booth. (My vote in Texas is wasted anyway) ... Romney is the opposite of conservative, with a plan that is fiscally reckless and a foreign policy that is unnecessarily militant. Obama has done about the best that could have been done, considering the united GOP opposition in Congress. My questions about Obamacare and my disappointment that we are not already out of Afghanistan are not enough to make me embrace a candidacy that even George W. Bush would have been repelled by—and, having had time to reflect on his own record, perhaps is."
