= Elm Thicket, Dallas =

Elm Thicket North Park
- Neighborhood
- Nickname: North Park
- Country: United States
- State: Texas
- County: Dallas
- City: Dallas
- Area: North Dallas

Area
  - Land: 0.8 sq mi (2.1 km^{2})
- Highest elevation: 544 ft (166 m)
- Lowest elevation: 497 ft (151 m)

Population
  - Estimate (2021) (est. 2021): 4,981

Race (est. 2014)
  - Native American: 2.90%
  - Black: 29.10%
  - Asian/Pacific Islander: 4.70%
  - Other: 9.20%

Ethnicity (est. 2021)
  - Hispanic: 26.40%
  - Non-Hispanic: 73.60%
- Time zone: UTC−6 (Central)
  - Summer (DST): UTC−5 (Central)
- ZIP Code: 75209
- Area codes: 214, 469, 972
- Website: www.elmthicketnorthpark.com

Elm Thicket (also known as Elm Thicket/Northpark) is a primarily residential neighborhood in North Dallas, Texas near Love Field airport and the neighborhoods of Love Field, Bluffview, Greenway Parks, University Park and Highland Park.

For most of its history the historical Elm Thicket/North Park area has been predominantly an African American community.

== Geography ==
Often referred to by residents as North Park, Elm Thicket/North Park refers to the current-day area bounded by Lover's Lane to the north, Lemmon Avenue to the west, Mockingbird Lane to the south, and Inwood Road to the east.

=== Historical ===
Elm Thicket referred to the lower Southwest portion of the neighborhood. This area was bounded by Mockingbird Lane to the South, Cedar Springs Road to the West, Roper Street to the East and University Boulevard to the North, and it was one of the few minority-majority areas of North Dallas. It is adjacent to the east side of Love Field airport. Portions of Elm Thicket were lost due to Love Field airport and roadway expansion.

A southeastern subsection of Elm Thicket/North Park is also known as Shannon Estates. This area is bounded by Inwood Road on the east, Mockingbird Lane on the south, Kenwell Street on the west, and West University Boulevard on the north.

In the 1944 Dallas Master Plan, Bluffview to the North originally extended south to University Blvd.

== Demographics ==
=== Race ===
Elm Thicket/North Park has undergone extensive social and physical change from 2000-2023. The African American population has dropped by half, from 62% of the neighborhood's population in 2000 to 29% in 2023. In the same time, the Hispanic population has experienced a rise and fall, from 26% to 42.5% and back again to 26.4%. The white population has risen from 11% to 61.7% of the neighborhood's population.

Population by Race
Race	2000	2010	2014	2019	2021
Black	61.6%	21.1%	14.2%	15.3%	29.1%
White	10.9%	66.0%	72.7%	81.2%	61.7%
American Indian		3.7%	2.4%	1.4%	2.9%
Asian		2.5%	3.6%	2.2%	4.7%
Native Hawaiian/Pacific Islander		0.1%	0.4%	0.4%	0.0%
Other		13.0%	11.2%	2.2%	9.2%
Hispanic	26.0%	35.7%	42.53%		26.4%

=== Housing ===
- Housing Type
  - Predominantly single family with a cluster of duplexes. Some apartments and condominiums.
- Housing Tenure/Occupancy
  - Primarily owner occupancy with a sizeable percentage of rental units.
  - Concentrations of single family renters on the western side.
  - 7.3% Vacancy rate
- Housing Conditions
  - Most housing is in average condition.
  - Pockets of poorer condition duplexes in the northwestern section.
- Property Value
  - Rising property values on the eastern portions, slower growth on the western side.
- New Construction/Improvement Activity
  - A dozen new single-family homes constructed 2012-2014.
  - High amount of home improvement activity throughout, especially in southeastern section.

=== Religion ===
Elm Thicket/North Park is home to several religious houses of worship:

- Bethany Missionary Baptist Church
- Church of the Living God CWFF
- Greater Zion Baptist Church
- Macedonia Missionary Baptist Church
- New Jerusalem AME Church
- North Park Church of God in Christ
- North Park CME Church
- North Park Missionary Baptist Church
- Whitlow Missionary Baptist Church
- St. Luke Missionary Baptist Church
- St. Thomas the Apostle Episcopal Church

For Catholic residents, Elm Thicket/North Park is within the parish boundaries for Our Lady of Perpetual Help Catholic Church (Iglesia Católica de Nuestra Señora del Perpetuo Socorro).

== History ==
=== North Park Name ===
One source said that the name originated from further development of the Elm Thicket area, roughly around 1940, with the development of the Booker T. Washington and North park additions. Another said the original name of the area was North Park and it was unofficially known as Elm Thicket.

=== Elm Thicket Park and Hilliard golf course ===
In 1944, construction of Elm Thicket Park began on land owned by neighboring Love Field airport, but temporarily loaned to the Dallas Parks Department until needed for airport expansion. In 1946, the Hexter and Frank Building Company filed with the City of Dallas, the Greenway Terrace additions. The Greenway Terrace additions, are orientated in the present northwest area of the neighborhood. The first development was located West of Kenwell Street, South of Hopkins Avenue, North of Wateka Drive and East of Roper Street. Greenway Terrace Number Two (#2) was further developed; West of Roper Street, North of Hopkins Avenue, South of Lovers Lane and East of Taos Road. In 1950, a 9-hole golf course was constructed on land owned by Love Field Airport. The Hilliard golf course, was dedicated in 1950 by the Dallas Negro Golf Association as the nation's first Negro golf course. In 1954, the land upon which the 9-hole golf course and adjoining Elm Thicket Park, was repossessed by the City of Dallas as part of the airport expansion and rerouting of roads to serve the expanding city.

=== 2000s ===
With support of the neighborhood's Crime Watch group and residents, the Dallas Police Department, in 2004, began to apply the "broken windows" police concept to address the blight afflicting the neighborhood.

=== 2010s ===
In the Spring of 2016, Elm Thicket/North Park was included in Dallas' Neighborhood Plus Plan. Adopted in 2015, Neighborhood Plus is a citywide neighborhood revitalization plan for the City of Dallas to alleviate poverty, fight blight, attract and retain the middle class, increase homeownership and enhance rental options.

In 2017, as part of the Neighborhood Plus program, residents of Elm Thicket/North Park were given an opportunity to share their stories, gather historical photos and archive information to help the neighborhood tell the story of this historic and dynamic part of the city. Interviews were recorded and combined into videos and published on YouTube.

== Government ==
- Dallas City Council: District 2: Councilmember Jesse Moreno
- Dallas County Commissioners Court: Precinct 4: Dr. Elba Garcia
- Texas State Representative: House District 103: Rafael Anchia
- Texas State Senator: District 23: Royce West
- Texas U.S. Representative: District 30: Eddie Bernice Johnson
- Texas U.S. Senators: John Cornyn and Ted Cruz
- Texas State Board of Education: District 13 Member: Aicha Davis

Last updated: January 25, 2022; 4 years ago

== Education ==
There are two schools located within the boundaries of Elm Thicket/North Park:

- K. B. Polk Center for Academically Talented and Gifted (Pre-K-5)
- Providence Christian School of Texas (Pre-K-8)

=== Public schools ===
The neighborhood is served by Dallas Independent School District public schools:

- K. B. Polk Center for Academically Talented and Gifted (Pre-K-5)
- Edward H. Cary Middle School (6-8)
- Thomas Jefferson High School (9-12)

Sudie L. Williams Talented and Gifted Academy (located next door in the Bluffview neighborhood) serves academically talented and gifted students in grades four through six (expanding to eighth grade by 2020). Admission to Williams is based on academic achievement and an application is required.

Henry W. Longfellow Career Exploration Academy (located next door in the Greenway Parks neighborhood) serves students in grades 6-8 selected through the magnet process. The students receive the same basic middle school program offered in all Dallas Independent School District middle schools. However, special focus is placed on the exploration and development of each student's interests and abilities.

=== Private schools ===
- Providence Christian School of Texas (Pre-K-8)
- Our Lady of Perpetual Help Catholic School (Pre-K-8)

=== Colleges and universities ===
Elm Thicket is in the Dallas County Community College District, which offers academic, continuing education, and adult education programs through seven community colleges and 14 campuses in Dallas County.

Southern Methodist University is two miles to the east of the neighborhood and is located on the same main thoroughfare (Mockingbird Avenue).

== Notable people ==
- Jason Smith, athlete (American football)
