= Dallas Water Utilities =

Dallas Water Utilities (DWU) is the water and wastewater service operated by the City of Dallas, Texas, in the United States. DWU is a non-profit City of Dallas department that provides services to the city and 31 nearby communities, employs approximately 1450 people, and consists of 26 programs. DWU's budget is completely funded through the rates charged for water and wastewater services provided to customers. Rates are based on the cost of providing the services. (Dallas City Charter, Chapter XI, Section 14) The department does not receive any tax revenues. Primary authority and rules for the department are listed in Chapter 49 of the Dallas City Code.

== History ==
Private owners developed the first public water supply in Dallas in 1876. The first sewers were built in the 1880s primarily for storm water drainage. At that time the street runoff and domestic sewage went directly to the Trinity River. Dallas Water Utilities began as the City of Dallas Waterworks in 1881 when the city purchased a privately owned water company that had been providing Dallas with water since the 1870s. When Browder Springs proved an inadequate water source, the city turned to surface water sources such as the Trinity River and manmade lakes in 1903.

== Administration ==
DWU is a department in the City of Dallas and falls under its management scheme. It is managed by a director and five assistant directors for the five primary functional areas:

Business Operations provides accounting, financial, and budget support to the Water Utilities Department; In addition, this program provides for the management of wholesale water and wastewater services to other governmental entities within the utility's service area. provides overall financial support to the Department in areas where the expenditures are not directly tied to the day-to-day operational and overhead aspects of the department. All such expenditures require special monitoring and control. Key items within General Expense and Debt Service include street rental, transfer to the construction funds, general fund cost reimbursement and debt service commitments

Customer Operations provides customer relations, billings, credit and collections activities, customer information, and all meter-associated services to the water, wastewater and stormwater utility customers. Works to promote DWU conservation programs.

Water Operations is responsible for operating and maintaining the facilities of the Water Utilities Department. These activities include the raw water impoundment and watershed management, and the purification, pumping and distribution of potable water.

Wastewater Operations is responsible for collecting, transporting, controlling the discharge of, and treating domestic and industrial wastes; and maintaining treatment plants and pipelines in the wastewater system.

Capital Improvement Operations plans, designs, constructs and inspects the capital projects needed to provide customers with water and wastewater facilities to meet the growth of the community, extension of water and wastewater mains, modification of facilities to meet changes in State and Federal regulatory requirements (Environmental Protection Agency Administrative Orders, Safe Drinking Water Act treatment parameters and Clean Water Act discharge limitations), and the rehabilitation and replacement of deteriorated or obsolete facilities.

== Business operations ==
=== Wholesale services ===
DWU has contractual relations with 31 wholesale water and wastewater customers. There are five general types of relationships:

- Wholesale Treated Water Customers
- Wholesale Untreated Water Customers
- Wholesale Wastewater Customers
- Wholesale Untreated Water Customers-Irrigation Only
- Reciprocal Water and Wastewater Customers

Wholesale customers to DWU include the communities of Addison, Carrollton, Cedar Hill, Cockrell Hill, The Colony, Coppell, Denton, DeSoto, Duncanville, Farmers Branch, Flower Mound, Glenn Heights, Grand Prairie, Grapevine, Highland Park, Hutchins, Irving, Lancaster, Lewisville, Mesquite, Ovilla, Red Oak, Richardson, Seagoville, University Park, and Wilmer, as well as Dallas County WCID #6, Dallas/Fort Worth International Airport, Ellis County WCID #1, and the Upper Trinity Regional Water District.

== Customer operations ==
=== Conservation program ===
Since the early 1980s City of Dallas Water Utilities has had conservation programs. Over the years activities have increased to include children activities, Water-Wise landscape seminars, an annual Water-Wise Landscape tour and more. In 2001, the Dallas City Council took conservation efforts to another level by adopting an irrigation ordinance which included time-of-day watering restrictions. In April 2012, the Council voted to adopt maximum twice-weekly watering, which allows outdoor irrigation only twice per week according to a schedule based on even/odd street address numbers.

The ordinance and other measures have reduced gallons per capita per day in Dallas by 26% since 2001 resulting in:

- An estimated water savings of over 316 billion gallons or 22 billion gallons annually
- An energy savings of 694.5 million kilowatt hours of electricity
- A reduction in greenhouse gas emissions by 478,614 tons

=== Meter reading ===
DWU has over 300,000 meters in its system. Approximately 6800 are AMI Fixed network units. Meters range in size from 5/8" to 10" or larger.

== Water operations ==
=== Water distribution system ===
The water distribution system of Dallas Water Utilities (DWU) is one of the largest in the United States. As of June 2003, DWU provided retail water service to just over 1.2 million people within the Dallas city limits. The major distribution system facilities include 28 pump stations (including the high service pump stations at the three water treatment plants), 11 ground storage reservoirs, 9 elevated tanks, and 78 vault structures separate from the major facilities, in addition to over 4,600 miles (7,400 km) of distribution and transmission main. The distribution system is divided into 17 pressure zones to maintain adequate water pressures throughout the system. There are four major pressure zones (Central Low, North High, East High, and South High), and five smaller secondary pressure zones (Meandering Way High, Red Bird High, Trinity Heights, Pleasant Grove, and Cedardale) which comprise most of the Dallas service area. Each of the nine major and secondary pressure zones are supplied by one or more pump stations and have elevated or ground storage facilities that establish the static hydraulic gradient for each zone. The remaining eight pressure zones are supplied from an adjacent pressure zone via pressure reducing valve, or single, small booster pump station. These pressure zones do not have storage facilities that establish their static hydraulic gradient.

There are 35 pressure monitoring points throughout the distribution system that are not located at a major facility. These points are connected to the SCADA system, and are used to monitor hydraulic conditions within the distribution system.

The distribution system consists of over 4,600 miles (7,400 km) of pipe with diameters ranging from less than 4 inches (100 mm) to 96 inches (2,400 mm) in diameter. The majority of the total pipe length is sized 8 inches (200 mm) in diameter. About 88 percent of the distribution system is pipes sized 16 inches (410 mm) or smaller in diameter. The DWU distribution system is made of several different pipe materials. Small diameter pipe materials include copper, galvanized iron, PVC, and cast iron. Larger diameter transmission mains are made of steel and various reinforced and prestressed concrete. Approximately 51 percent of the distribution system consists of grey cast iron pipe (CIP). The next most prevalent material types are ductile iron pipe (DIP) and PVC.

=== Water sources ===
Dallas' Long Range Water Supply Plan includes recommendations for water supplies to meet the needs of Dallas and the other cities served through 2050. The plan also includes water conservation and emergency water management plans.

Dallas uses six reservoirs as sources for raw water:

- Lake Ray Hubbard
- Lewisville Lake
- Grapevine Lake
- Ray Roberts Lake
- Lake Tawakoni
- Lake Fork Reservoir

Additionally Dallas has water rights to the following sources:

- Lake Palestine—unconnected
- Elm Fork Channel- near Lake Bachman on the Bachman Branch

The City constructed, owns, operates and has available 100% of the permitted water supply for the Ray Hubbard Reservoir. Pumpage of water to nearby treatment facilities began in the summer of 1973. A 1959 water permit applies to the reservoir, its use, and also permits (under limited conditions) storage and usage of water pumped by pipeline from Tawakoni Balancing Reservoir in Northeast Texas.

The Integrated Pipeline Project is a joint effort between the Tarrant Regional Water District (TRWD) and DWU that will bring additional water supplies to the rapidly growing Dallas/Fort Worth area within the next 10 years. Once completed, this 147-mile (237 km) pipeline will transport water from Lake Palestine, Cedar Creek Reservoir and Richland-Chambers Reservoir back to the TRWD and Dallas service areas. This project is jointly funded by TRWD and DWU, saving taxpayers millions of dollars and exhibiting a commitment by the region's two largest water providers to work together to meet the region's future water needs. Construction is expected to be complete by 2018.

=== Water treatment ===
The city owns and operates three drinking water treatment plants:

- East Side-The current treatment capacity of the East Side Water Treatment Plant (ESWTP) is 440 million US gallons (1,700,000 m^{3}) per day. An expansion to 540 million US gallons (2,000,000 m^{3}) per day is currently underway, and is projected to be completed in 2013.
- Elm Fork-The current treatment capacity of the Elm Fork Water Treatment Plant (EFWTP) is 310 million US gallons (1,200,000 m^{3}) per day.
- Bachman-The Bachman Water Treatment Plant (BWTP) first began treating water in 1930 at a capacity of 30 million US gallons (110,000 m^{3}) per day. Since 1930 the plant has undergone several major expansions to bring its capacity to 150 million US gallons (570,000 m^{3}) per day.

== Wastewater operations ==
=== Wastewater collection system ===
In the 1800s wastewater management consisted of releasing untreated wastewater directly into the Trinity River. In 1913 the Texas legislature passed an anti-pollution law that directed all cities with populations greater than 50,000 to cease discharging untreated wastewater into streams. In January 1917 Dallas completed a 6 million US gallons (23,000 m^{3}) per day wastewater treatment plant, the Central WWTP, to comply with this law. The plant was expanded to keep up with Dallas’ growth in the 1920s. Service was expanded to Highland Park and University Park in the 1930s. In 1964 the Central WWTP was augmented with a 3 million US gallons (11,000 m^{3}) per day Southside Oxidation Pond Facility (now called the Southside WWTP).

For convenience in managing the city's extensive network of interceptor and collector sewers, DWU has divided the system into a number of primary sewer basins based on the drainage pattern for the sewers within the basin. There are 12 primary basins. Ten of the basins transport flow to Dallas treatment plants. These basins are (alphabetically) the Elam Creek, East Bank, Five Mile Creek, Hickory Creek, Prairie Creek, South Dallas, Warren Avenue, West Bank and White Rock Creek Basins. Each basin is named for, and discharges flow into, the major interceptor sewer line traversing the area. The other two primary basins transport flow to other regional sewer providers. These basins, the TRA and Garland basins, are named after the regional provider. The primary basins are further divided into smaller drainage basins, termed sewersheds. 48 of the sewersheds are tributary to Dallas wastewater treatment plants, three of the sewersheds are tributary to the Trinity River Authority (TRA) system, and one is tributary to the Garland system. The DWU Wastewater Collection System is over 4,000 miles (6,400 km) long and includes 15 lift stations. Pipe sizes in the system range from 4" to 120" inches.

DWU's wastewater collection program is primarily responsible for the pipes built outside the plant footprints. Key activities of this program include:

- Sewer line maintenance (root control, mechanical cleaning, high velocity pressure cleaning, rehabilitation, repair, and point repairs)
- Emergency response
- Television inspection
- Flow monitoring

=== Wastewater treatment ===
The city operates two wastewater sewage treatment plants, Central and Southside.

The Central Wastewater Treatment Plant (CWWTP) has a design treatment capacity of 170 million US gallons (640,000 m^{3}) per day, and treats an average flow of about 100 MGD. The peak treatment capacity of CWWTP is rated at 350 million US gallons (1,300,000 m^{3}) per day.

City of Dallas's Central Wastewater Treatment Plant (CWWTP) is a conventional activated sludge plant with trickling filters. DWU Central WWTP is in operation for more than 100 years and has gone through various changes throughout those years. Most prominently, after the introduction of Clean Water Act, activated sludge was included to the treatment process along with trickling filters. DWU Central plant is divided in to three major sections: Dallas plant, White Rock plant, and Activated Sludge Plant. Wastewater flows from various sections of the City come through Cadiz pump station or via White Rock interceptors to both Dallas plant and White Rock plant. After the primary treatment (including bar screens, primary clarifications and trickling filters) at both of these plants, the flow is combined at Activated Sludge Influent Pump Station (ASIPS) which is then diverted to Complex A and Complex B for activated sludge process. Effluent of activated sludge process passes through secondary clarification and then disinfected using gaseous chlorine in chlorine contact chambers. After disinfection, effluent is filtered through dual-media gravity filters and de-chlorinated before discharging into the Trinity River. DWU Central plant pumps its sludge to DWU Southside wastewater treatment plant for the anaerobic digestion. DWU Central plant provides Type II reuse water to a city park and two city-owned golf courses. The reuse water has residual chlorine per requirement.

DWU Central Plant currently has six (6) “A”, seven (7)”B”, 14 “C”, and five (5) “D” Texas Commission on Environmental Quality TCEQ Certified operators on staff.

CWWTP is ISO 9001, 14001, and 18000 compliant. CWWTP maintenance staff has implemented predictive maintenance program (PdM), Lean Six Sigma as well as utilized drone technologies to manage assets while reducing risks.

Awards Received by DWU's Central Wastewater Treatment Plant (CWWTP):

- WEAT Plant of the year award for Year 2016 (State)
- WEAT Operator of the Year Award (State)
- WEAT George Burke Safety Award (State)
- WEF Water Heroes Award (National)

CWWTP was also nominated for the Resilient Utility of the Year Award for year 2017.

The Southside Wastewater Treatment Plant (SWWTP) has a maximum capacity of 160 MGD and treats an average flow of about 65 MGD.

Both CWWTP and SSWWTP are permitted by the Texas Commission on Environmental Quality to discharge to the Trinity River.

=== Pretreatment and Laboratory Services ===
Pretreatment and Laboratory Services (PALS) administers local, state, and federal regulations to control pollutants discharged from commercial and industrial users (IUs) within the city of Dallas which may pass through or interfere with the city's Publicly Owned Treatment Works (POTW). The city's POTW consists of two wastewater treatment plants treating up to 260 million US gallons (980,000 m^{3}) per day, fourteen pump stations, and over 4,100 miles (6,600 km) of sanitary sewer collection pipelines. The Pretreatment Program administers and enforces the regulations in order to:

- Protect the city's wastewater collection systems, treatment plants, and workers
- Allow the beneficial re-use of bio-solids
- Allow the reclamation of treated effluent for irrigation and other uses
- Maintain water quality in the Trinity River.

POTWs are designed to treat typical household wastes and biodegradable commercial and industrial wastes. Commercial and industrial facilities that discharge toxic pollutants to the treatment plants may be very detrimental to treatment plant processes and the environment. IUs which discharge pollutants into the POTW are required to install, operate, and adequately maintain pretreatment equipment to remove pollutants that could otherwise damage, obstruct, interfere with, or pass through the POTW. Examples of such pollutants include heavy metals, cyanides, toxic organics, and acidic or basic wastes from industrial operations. Heavy metals and some organic chemicals which cannot be treated by the biological treatment process can threaten the bacteria which are necessary to the treatment process at the wastewater treatment plants.

Wastewater from restaurants and other food service industries are often more problematic due to the prevalence of conventional pollutants such as grease, organic matter and solids. Grease can clog and overload the sewer system. Processing these food contaminants raises the cost of treating wastewater.

The Pretreatment Program protects the treatment process and keeps costs down by working with local businesses to minimize pollutant discharges. Activities of the city's Pretreatment Program include the review of pretreatment designs, the issuance of permits, facility inspections, monitoring of facilities (wastewater sample collection), review of industry self-monitoring reports, and enforcement activities.

PALS also operates 2 Process Laboratories, one for each of the two wastewater treatment plants, and an Analytical Laboratory, whose primary function is the analysis of industrial wastes discharged to the collection system.

== Capital improvement operations ==
DWU's goal is to continually, evaluate, upgrade and replace its water and wastewater assets in order to make both systems operate efficiently. The Capital Program consists of five programs: Engineering Services, Pipeline Program, Utility Automation and Integration (UAI), Wastewater Facilities, Water Facilities.

Engineering Services is primarily responsible for updating pipeline design related manuals, relocating pipes in advance of pavement, and designing pipeline projects. Relocations is a section within Engineering Services whose primary function is the work with Texas Department of Transportation, Dallas County, the Army Corps of Engineers, City of Dallas Public Works & Transportation in a joint effort to replace designated pipes in advance of pavement renewal or other projects that impact the DWU water or wastewater pipeline systems.

Pipeline Program is primarily responsible for the study, evaluation and construction of water or wastewater lines.

Utility Automation and Integration (UAI) is primarily responsible for updating and maintaining files, documents, plans, digital files, and maps of historical value

Wastewater Facilities is primarily responsible for working with Wastewater Operations in the construction of new or replacement facility-related infrastructure

Water Facilities is primarily responsible for working with Water Operations in the construction or new or replacement facility-related infrastructure.

== Professional associations ==
- DWU is part of the Texas Water Development Board Region C planning District.
