= Bachman Branch =

Location
- Country: United States

Physical characteristics
- Source
  - location: northwest Dallas, Texas (USA)
  - elevation: 183 m (600 ft)
- Mouth
  - location: Trinity River
  - coordinates: 32°50′38.40″N 96°53′21.56″W
  - elevation: 123 m (404 ft)
- Length: 10 mi (16 km)

Bachman Branch (also Bachman Creek) is a medium-sized tributary of the Trinity River with headwaters in northwest Dallas, Texas (USA). The tributary is 10 miles (16 km) in length and rises at Forest Lane, 0.5 miles (0.8 km) west of the Dallas North Tollway. It runs south and west through Bachman Lake and ultimately into the Elm Fork of the Trinity River. The Branch is dammed with the New Frazier dam to provide water to Fishing Hole Lake. New Frasier Dam is on the Elm Fork Of Trinity River in Dallas County, Texas and is used for flood control purposes. Construction was completed in 1965. It is owned by the Dallas Water Utilities New Frasier Dam is a gravity dam. Its height is 16 feet with a length of 180 feet. Its capacity is 651 acre-feet (803,000 m^{3}). Normal storage is 651 acre-feet (803,000 m^{3}).

The community of Bachman is named for Bachman Branch.

Headwaters: 32°55′15.10″N 96°49′11.21″W

Mouth: 32°50′38.40″N 96°53′21.56″W

== See also ==
- List of rivers of Texas
