= Brentwood Magazine =

American entertainment magazine

- Editor: Jenny Peters
- Categories: Local interest, entertainment
- Frequency: Bi-monthly
- Founded: 1994
- Company: ValCom Inc.
- Country: United States
- Based in: Los Angeles
- Language: English
- Website: www.brentwoodmagazine.com

Brentwood Magazine is a magazine edited by Jenny Peters that covers fashion, travel, and entertainment news for Los Angeles and beyond. It is a full-color magazine, published six times a year. The magazine describes itself as "Southern California's affluent entertainment magazine." Brentwood Magazine is distributed to homes in West Los Angeles, Beverly Hills, Brentwood, Bel Air, Westwood, Pacific Palisades, Malibu, Santa Monica, West Hollywood, Marina del Ray and Venice Beach. Brentwood Magazine is also available at Los Angeles newsstands or by subscription.

Troy Linger was the founder and original publisher of Brentwood, and he launched the magazine in 1994. In 2002 he sold Brentwood to ValCom Inc., based in Valencia, California, on undisclosed terms.
