= Bluffview, Dallas =

Coordinates: 32.858°N 96.829°W

Bluffview
- Neighborhood
- Location in Dallas
- Country: United States
- State: Texas
- County: Dallas
- City: Dallas
- Area: North Dallas
- Elevation: 518 ft (158 m)
- Time zone: UTC−6 (Central)
  - Summer (DST): UTC−5 (Central)
- ZIP Code: 75209
- Area codes: 214, 469, 972

Bluffview is a neighborhood in North Dallas, Texas (USA). It is bounded by Northwest Highway (Loop 12) and the Preston Hollow neighborhood on the north, Inwood Road and the Devonshire neighborhood on the east, University Boulevard and the Elm Thicket/North Park neighborhood on the south, and Midway Road, Bluebonnett Road, Bluff View Blvd., and the Shorecrest and Cochran's Chapel neighborhoods on the west.

A subsection of Bluffview is Briarwood, which is bounded by Lovers Lane on the south, Inwood Road to the east, Horseshoe Trail & Briarwood Place to the north and Elsby Avenue on the west. The neighborhood was established in the late 1930s by the Elsby family on the site of the former Bluffview Dairy. The Briarwood Crime Watch & Neighborhood Association is a volunteer-run organization primarily focused on safety and crime prevention, as well as sponsoring community activities.

== Geography ==
A house in Bluffview

Bluffview is so named for its relatively hilly topography—it lies along cliffs overlooking Bachman Branch and its tributaries. Some of the cliffs the neighborhood is built on rise 50 feet (15 m) over the water below. The neighborhood is also known for its plentiful tree coverage and canopied streets.

== History ==
The neighborhood was originally developed as Bluff View Estates by developer J.P. Stephenson. In 1924, he bought a 215 acres (0.9 km^{2}) dairy farm along Bachman Branch and developed the land into 1 acre (4,046.9 m^{2}) lots. The area was annexed by Dallas in March 1943.

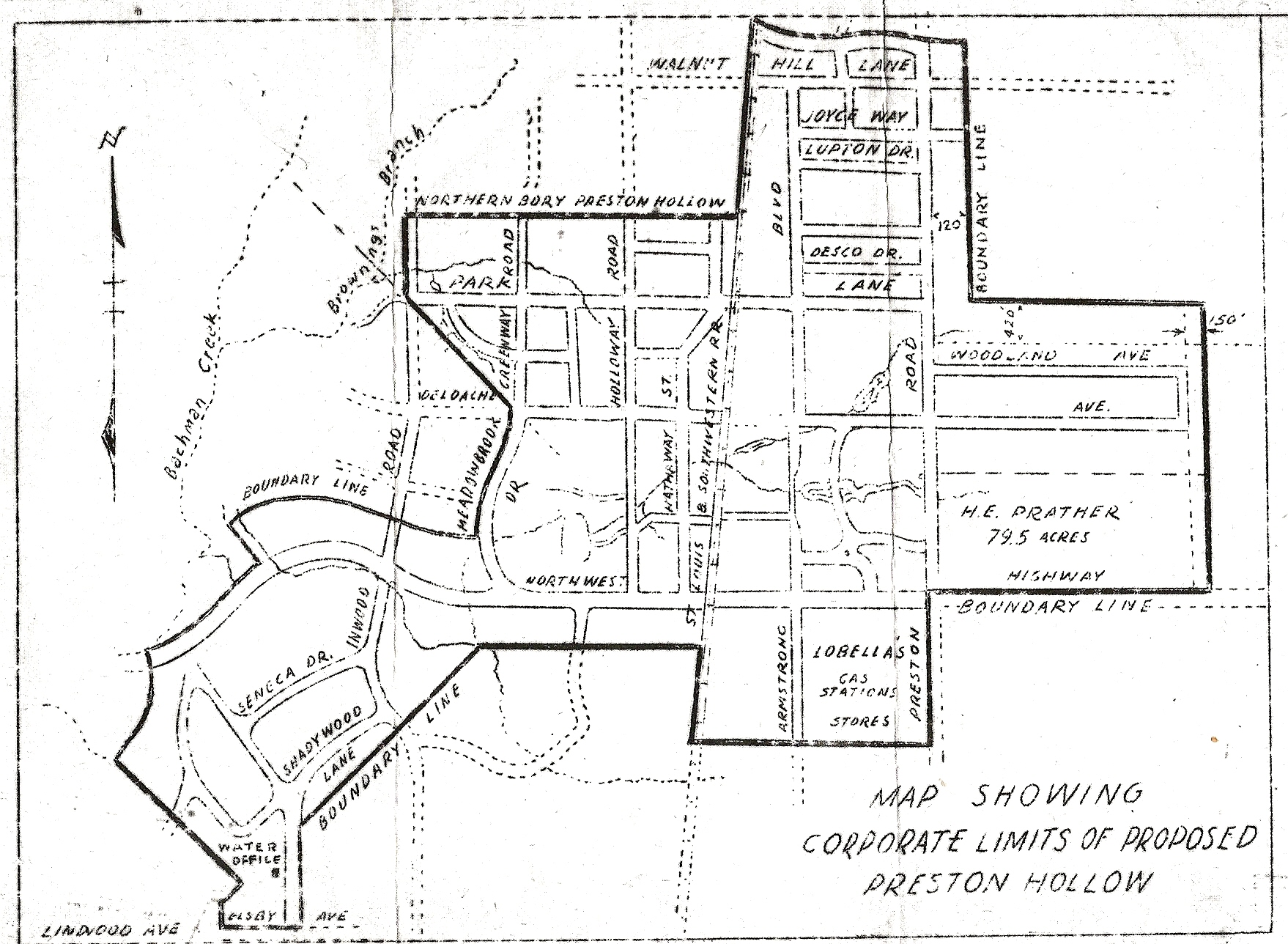
Map of Old Preston Hollow, showing a portion of Bluffview (lower left corner) within the town.

A portion of Bluffview in the northeast corner was originally planned to be within the boundaries of the town (now neighborhood) of Preston Hollow. While Bluffview was annexed by Dallas in March 1943, it was not until 1945 that Preston Hollow was annexed.

== Demographics ==
Bluffview is included in a census tract that also includes the Shorecrest and Cochran's Chapel neighborhoods.

Census Data (2010) (includes Bluffview, Shorecrest, & Cochran's Chapel neighborhoods)
Population	Count	%
Total	4,138	100.0%
White alone	3,394	82.0%
Black or African American alone	138	3.3%
American Indian and Alaska Native alone	5	0.1%
Asian alone	96	2.3%
Native Hawaiian and Other Pacific Islander alone	1	0.0%
Some Other Race alone	406	9.8%
Two or More Races	98	2.4%

== Education ==
=== Public schools ===
The neighborhood is served by the Dallas Independent School District for public schools.

Children within the neighborhood are served by:

- K. B. Polk Center for Academically Talented and Gifted (Pre-K-5) in neighboring Elm Thicket/North Park neighborhood
- Edward H Cary Middle School (6-8) in Walnut Hill neighborhood
- Thomas Jefferson High School (9-12) in Walnut Hill neighborhood

Sudie L. Williams Talented and Gifted Academy (located within the Bluffview neighborhood and formerly known as Sudie L. Williams Elementary School) serves academically talented and gifted students in grades four through six (expanding to eighth grade by 2020). Admission to Williams is based on academic achievement and an application is required.

Henry W. Longfellow Career Exploration Academy (located next door in the Greenway Parks neighborhood) serves students in grades 6-8 selected through the magnet process. The students receive the same basic middle school program offered in all Dallas Independent School District middle schools. However, special focus is placed on the exploration and development of each student's interests and abilities.

=== Private schools ===
Nearby private schools include Good Shepherd Episcopal School (PreK-8), St. Mark's School of Texas (1-12), The Hockaday School (PreK-12, Girls), Greenhill School (PreK-12), The Episcopal School of Dallas (PreK-12), Jesuit College Preparatory School of Dallas (9-12, Boys), The Lamplighter School (PreK-4), Ursuline Academy of Dallas, Christ the King Catholic School (K-8), and Alcuin School (K-12)

=== Colleges and universities ===
Bluffview is in the Dallas County Community College District, which offers academic, continuing education, and adult education programs through seven community colleges and 14 campuses in Dallas County.

== Religion ==
Many houses of worship are nearby including: Cochran Chapel United Methodist Church, The Church of Jesus Christ of Latter-Day Saints, Lovers Lane United Methodist Church, Fifth Church of Christ, Scientist, Northwest Bible Church, Saint Michael and All Angels Episcopal Church, Christ the King Catholic Church, Congregation Shearith Israel, Temple Emanu-El, and Park Cities Baptist Church.

== Government ==
- Dallas City Council: District 13: Councilmember: Gay Donnell Willis
- Dallas County Commissioners Court: Precinct 4: Elba Garcia
- Texas State Representative: House District 108: Morgan Meyer
- Texas State Senator: District 16: Nathan M. Johnson
- Texas U.S. Representative:
  - Most of the neighborhood is represented by District 32: Colin Allred
  - A small portion of the neighborhood, in the northwest corner, is represented by District 24: Kenny Marchant
- Texas U.S. Senators: John Cornyn and Ted Cruz
- Texas State Board of Education: District 12 Member: Pam Little

Last updated: January 5, 2019; 7 years ago

== Parks and recreation ==
=== Bluff View Park ===
Bluff View Park is a 2.6 acre neighborhood park, established in 1945, and managed by the Dallas Parks and Recreation Department. Located adjacent to Sudie L. Williams Talented and Gifted Academy, it features benches, a drinking fountain, an outdoor basketball court, picnic tables, a playground, and a soccer field.

== Notable people ==
- Don Henley, an American musician, singer, songwriter, record producer and founding member of the Eagles.
- Kay Bailey Hutchison, an American attorney, television correspondent, politician, and diplomat who is the 22nd United States Permanent Representative to NATO and was a United States senator for Texas from 1993 to 2013.
