= Isolde Motley =

Isolde Motley is an Irish magazine editor. She is the former corporate editor of Time Inc where she oversaw the editorial content of the company's women's magazines, including In Style, Essence, Real Simple, and Parenting. She was previously the former chief editor of Life magazine and the founding editor of This Old House and Martha Stewart Living magazines.
