= Bachman Lake =

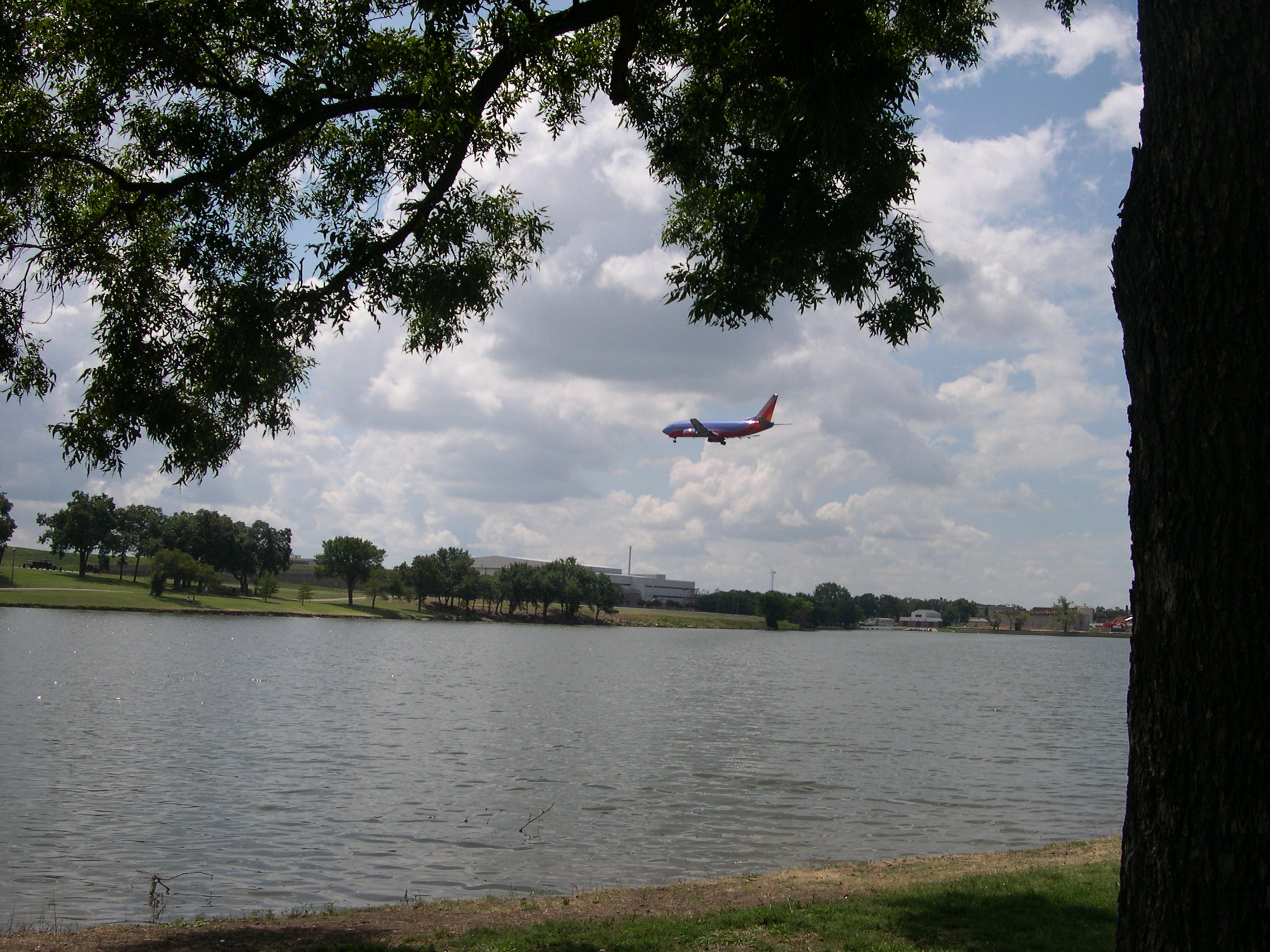
- A Southwest Airlines jet lands at Dallas Love Field over Bachman Lake

- Location within Texas
- Location: Northwest Dallas, Texas
- Coordinates: 32°50′56″N 96°52′16″W
- Type: Artificial lake
- Basin countries: United States
- Surface area: 205 acres (83 ha)
- Surface elevation: 440 ft (130 m)
- Settlements: Dallas

Bachman Lake is a small freshwater lake located in the Bachman Lake community of northwest Dallas, Texas (USA). It covers 205 acres (0.83 km^{2}) and lies on the northwest boundary of Dallas Love Field in the airport's landing path and the western boundary of the upscale Bluffview neighborhood. At the Western end of the lake, DART provides transit service at Bachman Station, including light rail service via the Green Line and Orange Line.

== History & Development ==
Bachman Lake was originally constructed in 1903 by damming Bachman Branch as a water source for Dallas, but it proved to be too small for the city's needs which led to the construction of White Rock Lake in 1911. Today, Dallas Water Utilities operates the Bachman Water Treatment Plant (WTP), which is the city's oldest operating water treatment plant still in operation.

The area surrounding the lake is currently a hot bed of new construction. The Shops at Bluffview brought 260,000 square feet (24,000 m^{2}) of upscale apartment, retail, restaurant and office development to the area in 2008. In 2019, Trinisc Residential completed the Aura at Bluffview, a 473-unit Class A apartment community on the lake's northeastern trailhead.

== Recreation ==
Today, Bachman Lake is used as a recreational area that includes the Bachman Recreation Center, several picnic areas, and a playground. A 3.3-mile (5.3 km) paved trail for pedestrians and cyclists surrounds the lake with fitness stations, benches, water fountains, restrooms, and picnic areas at several locations.

Bachman Lake also serves as the home of the Dallas Rowing Club and supports sailing and rowing with a marina and boathouse. Fishing is also permitted as the lake is regularly stocked with catfish (see Stocking Schedule). The feeding of wildlife is prohibited due to the lake's location in the flight path of Love Field.

=== Planned Improvements ===
The Dallas Water Utilities is undertaking the Bachman Lake Dam and Spillway Rehabilitation project. It will ensure dam safety, minimize flood risk, and provide regulatory compliance. In addition, dredging maintenance improvements will help revitalize the lake, improve water quality and allow residents to enjoy the lake for years to come. The project started July 2019 and is estimated to be completed in 2025. Dallas Water Utilities created a website to keep the public informed on construction activities. Bachman Lake Dam and Spillway Rehabilitation project website.

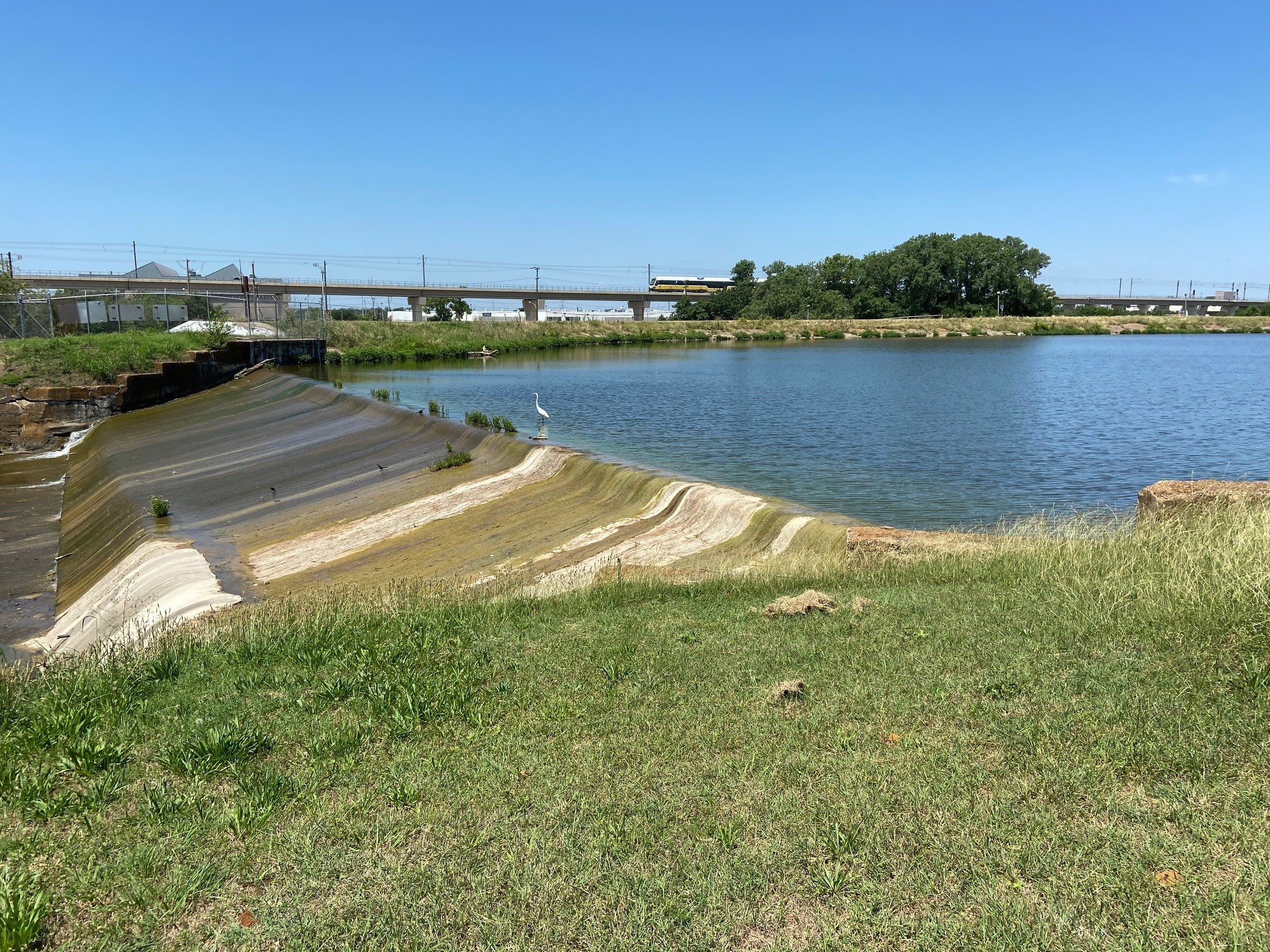
Bachman Lake Dam Spillway in 2020.

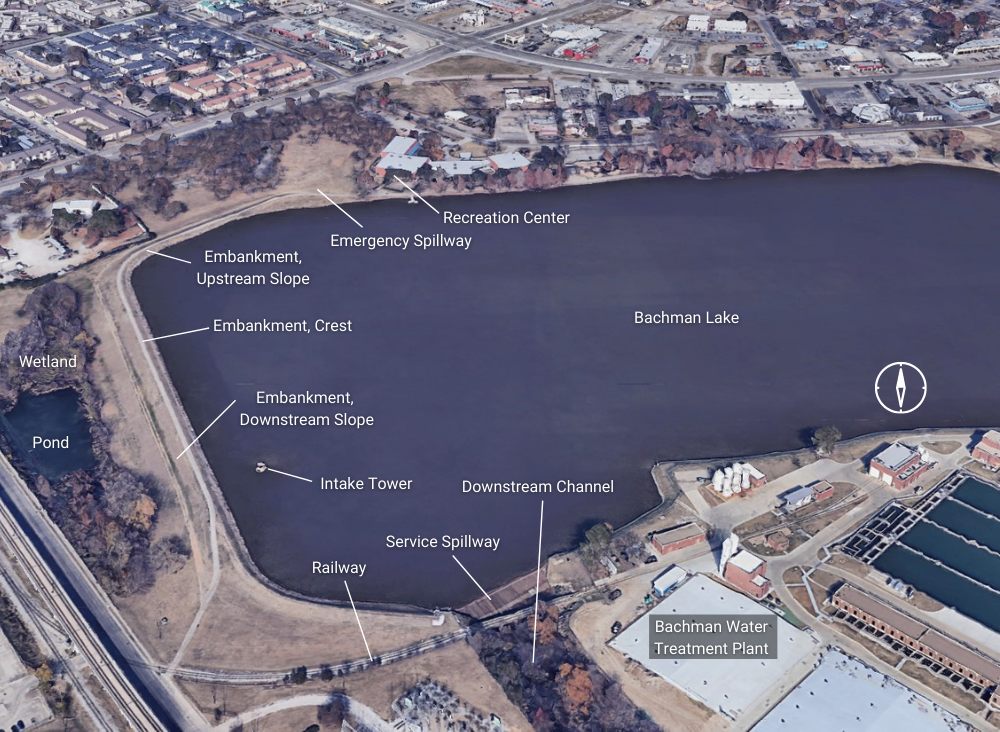
Bachman Lake Dam Components

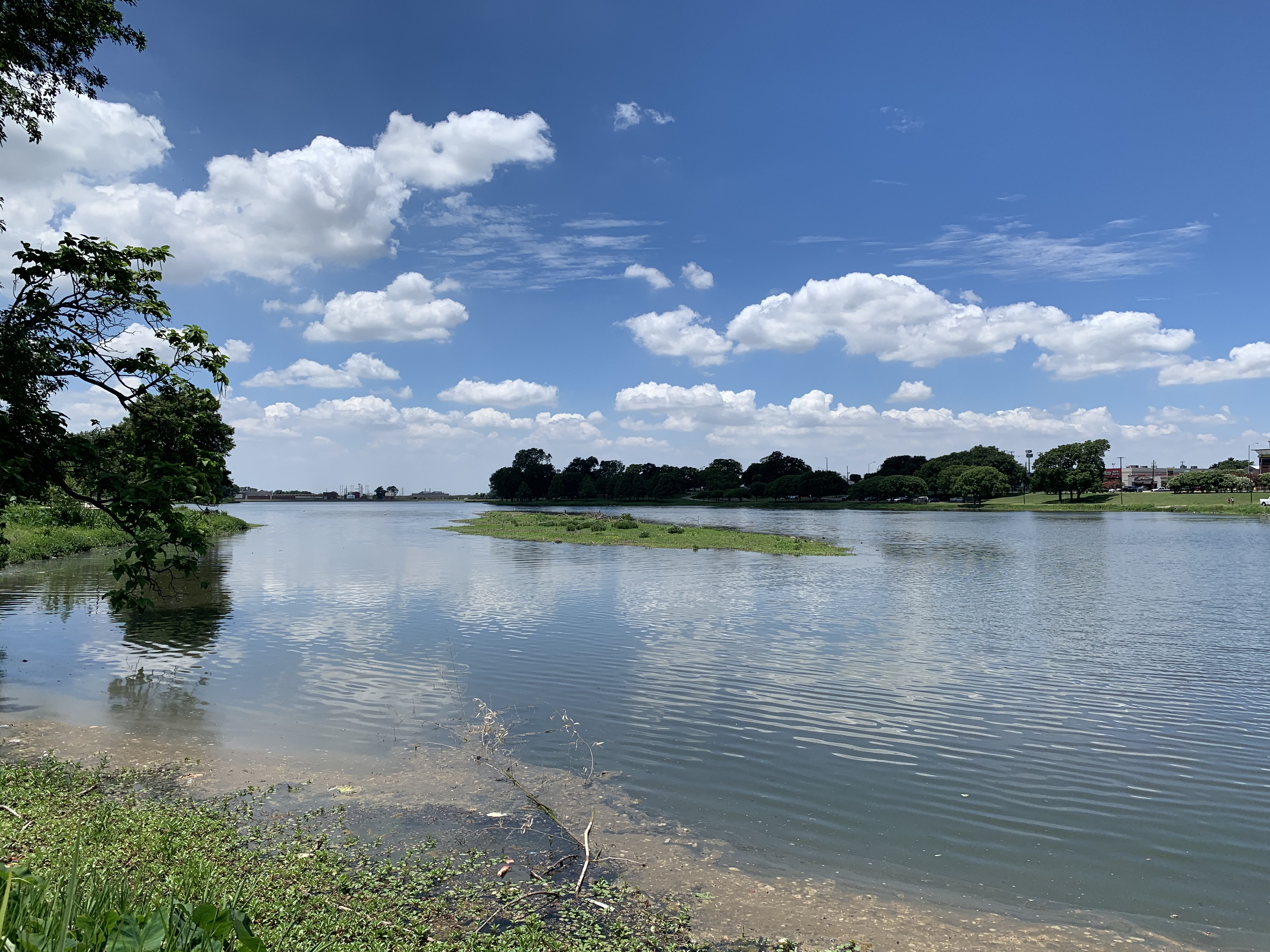
Example from 2020 of shallow water depth due to sediment build-up.

The lake was the subject of media interest in 2017 over the development of an island in the middle, which may be attributed to poor construction management practices and/or normal sedimentation patterns. In April 2019, a City task force voted to recommend a "maintain the lake" option that would ultimately keep the lake's existing size and footprint largely intact by repairing the lake's dam and dredging the lake to remove sediment.

In 2017, City voters approved bond propositions that include $11.4 million for parks projects around Bachman Lake including:

1. $3.9 million for the renovation of Bachman Recreation Center, completed in May 2021.
2. $3.5 million for a new regional aquatics center called the "Bachman Family Aquatics Center". Open as of July 2023.
3. $4 million for a new skate park, which is expected to complete design in 2020 and construction in 2023.
