= D Magazine =

Monthly magazine covering Dallas-Fort Worth, Texas, United States

- Editor-in-Chief: Christine Allison
- Categories: City magazine
- Frequency: Monthly
- Total circulation: 60,971 (June 2012)
- Founder: Wick Allison; Jim Atkinson
- Founded: 1974; 52 years ago
- First issue: October 1974; 52 years ago
- Company: D Magazine Partners
- Country: United States
- Based in: Dallas, Texas
- Language: American English
- Website: www.dmagazine.com
- ISSN: 0161-7826

D Magazine is an American monthly magazine covering Dallas–Fort Worth metroplex, Texas. It is headquartered in Downtown Dallas.

D Magazine covers a range of topics including politics, business, food, fashion and lifestyle in the city of Dallas. The first issue was published in October 1974 by its founders, Wick Allison and Jim Atkinson.

== History ==
D Magazine was founded in 1974 by two University of Texas at Austin graduates, Wick Allison and Jim Atkinson. Both had a vision of giving Dallas an independent city magazine with an impact that would serve readers’ interests. They developed their concept after-hours while Allison, a Dallas native, attended graduate school at Southern Methodist University and Atkinson reported on KERA's daily Newsroom program. Their vision was backed financially by young Dallas business people who shared their belief in the need for a strong city magazine.

The magazine received an early boost from Neiman Marcus founder Stanley Marcus, who sent a letter to 200,000 Neiman Marcus cardholders in the Dallas area, urging them to subscribe to the new magazine. It is a member of the City and Regional Magazine Association (CRMA).

The magazine was not well received by everyone. In 1975 then-mayor Wes Wise sued the magazine for libel. That same year the Dallas Restaurant Association sent a letter to its members urging an advertising boycott of the magazine because of its critical dining reviews. In 1990, American Express purchased the magazine, but the new ownership was not successful. In 1996, original founder Wick Allison repurchased the magazine with a group of investors, and in 2003 became the sole owner.

The editors and staff writers of D also publish FrontBurner, a blog about things relating to Dallas. In 2000, Allison launched a sister magazine, D Home, for the home furnishings industry, and in 2003 a magazine for local brides called D Weddings. By 2007 there were five more magazines under the D brand, serving various communities of interest, as well as nine associated community weeklies serving affluent neighborhoods in Dallas.

In 2008, D Magazine laid off 19% of its staff and closed three of its newspapers due to shrinking revenue from advertising. The magazine laid off an additional 12% of its staff in 2009.

D Magazine Partners also publishes D Home, D CEO, Dallas/Fort Worth Medical Directory, D Weddings, Private School Handbook, and Dmagazine.com, a daily resource for best restaurants in Dallas, recommendations for things to do, local news, and commentary on life in Dallas.

== Awards and nominations ==
Selected awards and nominations for D Magazine and its sister publications
Year	Type	Category	Award	Title
2026	City & Regional Magazine Awards	Online Excellence	Winner	D Magazine, DMagazine.com
2026	City & Regional Magazine Awards	Short Writing Lifestyle	Winner	D Magazine, "Hot Dish!" — Tim Rogers
2026	City & Regional Magazine Awards	Profile (circulation under 33,000)	Finalist	D CEO, "Don't Tell Tiffany Derry No" — Ben Swanger
2026	City & Regional Magazine Awards	Feature Design (circulation under 33,000)	Finalist	D CEO, "The New Energy Barons" — Hamilton Hedrick
2026	City & Regional Magazine Awards	Ancillary Publication	Finalist	Sports Business (entered under D Magazine)
2024	City & Regional Magazine Awards	Illustration and Graphics	Winner	D Magazine — Lesley Busby
2024	City & Regional Magazine Awards	Online Column	Winner	D Magazine, "StrongSide" — Mike Piellucci
2024	City & Regional Magazine Awards	Ancillary: Home/Shelter	Finalist	D Home, September/October 2023
2023	City & Regional Magazine Awards	Reporting	Winner	D Magazine, "The Most Lawless County in Texas" — Kathy Wise
2023	City & Regional Magazine Awards	Feature Story (circulation under 60,000)	Winner	D Magazine, "The Worst Part About Dying" — Eleanor Cummins
2023	City & Regional Magazine Awards	Ancillary: General Interest	Winner	D CEO, September 2022
2023	City & Regional Magazine Awards	Ancillary: Home/Shelter	Winner	D Home, March/April 2022
2022	City & Regional Magazine Awards	General Excellence 2	Winner	D Magazine
2022	City & Regional Magazine Awards	Excellence in Writing	Winner	D Magazine, November issue
2022	City & Regional Magazine Awards	Civic Journalism	Winner	D Magazine, "The Fair Park Lie" — Zac Crain
2022	City & Regional Magazine Awards	Online Column	Winner	D Magazine, "Local News" — Matt Goodman
2022	City & Regional Magazine Awards	E-Newsletter	Winner	D Magazine, SideDish
2022	City & Regional Magazine Awards	Ancillary: Weddings	Winner	D Weddings, summer issue
2021	City & Regional Magazine Awards	Essays/Commentary/Criticism	Winner	D Magazine, "Growing Old Gratefully" — Sarah Hepola
2020	City & Regional Magazine Awards	General Excellence 2 (circulation 30,000–60,000)	Winner	D Magazine
2020	City & Regional Magazine Awards	Food or Dining Writing	Winner	D Magazine — Eve Hill-Agnus
2020	City & Regional Magazine Awards	Profile (circulation under 60,000)	Winner	D Magazine — Zac Crain
2020	City & Regional Magazine Awards	Ancillary: General Interest	Finalist	D CEO, September 2019
2020	City & Regional Magazine Awards	Ancillary: Home/Shelter	Finalist	D Home, November/December 2019
2019	City & Regional Magazine Awards	Multiplatform Storytelling	Winner	D Magazine, "A Day in Dallas"
2019	City & Regional Magazine Awards	General Excellence 2 (circulation 30,000–60,000)	Winner	D Magazine
2019	City & Regional Magazine Awards	Ancillary: Weddings	Finalist	D Weddings, Fall/Winter 2018
2019	City & Regional Magazine Awards	Ancillary: General Interest	Finalist	D CEO, November 2018
2019	City & Regional Magazine Awards	Profile (circulation under 60,000)	Finalist	D Magazine, "The Rogue Shepherd" — Kathy Wise
2019	City & Regional Magazine Awards	Ancillary: Home/Shelter	Finalist	D Home, November/December 2018
2018	FOLIO Awards: Eddies	City & Regional – Long-Form Feature Content	Winner	D Magazine, "The Rogue Shepherd"
2018	FOLIO Awards: Eddies	City & Regional – Podcast	Winner	D Magazine, EarBurner podcast
2018	FOLIO Awards: Eddies	Consumer/Custom – Supplemental, Annual or One-Shot	Winner	D Magazine, 100 Ideas to Living a Beautiful Life in Dallas
2018	FOLIO Awards: Eddies	City & Regional – Range of Work by a Single Author	Honorable mention	D Magazine — Zac Crain
2018	FOLIO Awards: Eddies	Consumer – Newsletter	Honorable mention	D Magazine, D Brief
2018	FOLIO Awards: Eddies	City & Regional – Immersive/Interactive Storytelling	Honorable mention	D Magazine, "10 Most Stylish People in Dallas"
2018	FOLIO Awards: Eddies	City & Regional – Full Issue – South West	Honorable mention	D Magazine, May 2018
2018	FOLIO Awards: Eddies	City & Regional – Full Issue – South West	Honorable mention	D Home, September/October 2017
2018	FOLIO Awards: Eddies	Individuals & Teams – Magazine of the Year	Honorable mention	D Magazine
2018	FOLIO Awards: Eddies	City & Regional – Feature Design	Winner	D Magazine, Best Steakhouses feature
2018	FOLIO Awards: Eddies	City & Regional – Cover Design	Honorable mention	D Magazine, Best Steakhouses
2018	FOLIO Awards: Eddies	Consumer – Photography	Honorable mention	D Weddings, Gown Shoot
2018	FOLIO Awards: Eddies	Best Non-Newspaper Food Feature	Winner	D Magazine, "Taste Japan in Dallas" — Eve Hill-Agnus
2018	FOLIO Awards: Eddies	Best Food Coverage in a Magazine	Winner	D Magazine — Eve Hill-Agnus
2017	FOLIO Awards: Eddies Digital	City & Regional – News Coverage	Winner	D Magazine, Barrett Brown's City Council Reports
2017	FOLIO Awards: Eddies Digital	City & Regional – Series of Articles	Winner	D Magazine, coverage of Dr. Christopher Duntsch
2017	FOLIO Awards: Ozzies Digital	Consumer/City & Regional – Site Design	Honorable mention	D Magazine, Visual Storytelling: Greatest Dallasites
2016	FOLIO Awards: Eddies Digital	Consumer – Column/Blog	Honorable mention	D Magazine, The Real Housewives of Dallas recaps
2016	FOLIO Awards: Eddies	Consumer – Single Article – Regional	Honorable mention	D Magazine, "When Henry Wade Executed an Innocent Man"
2016	FOLIO Awards: Ozzies Digital	Consumer – Site Design	Honorable mention	D Magazine, Neighborhood Guides
2016	FOLIO Awards: Ozzies Digital	Consumer – Overall Design – Under 250,000 Circulation	Honorable mention	DMagazine.com
2015	FOLIO Awards: Eddies Digital	Consumer – Website – Media/Entertainment Publishing	Honorable mention	D Magazine, "How Not To Get Away With Murder"
2015	FOLIO Awards: Eddies Digital	Consumer – Single Article – Regional	Honorable mention	DMagazine.com
2015	FOLIO Awards: Ozzies	Consumer – Site Design	Honorable mention	D Weddings, Spring/Summer 2015
