= Greenway Parks, Dallas =

Coordinates: 32.841°N 96.818°W

Greenway Parks
- Interactive map of Greenway Parks
- Country: United States
- State: Texas
- County: Dallas
- City: Dallas
- Area: North Dallas
- Elevation: 531 ft (162 m)
- ZIP Code: 75209
- Area codes: 214, 469, 972
- Website: www.greenwayparks.com

Greenway Parks is a 150-acre residential neighborhood located approximately five miles north of downtown Dallas, Texas, bounded by the Dallas North Tollway on the east, Mockingbird Lane on the south, Inwood Road on the west, and University Boulevard on the north. It borders the city of Highland Park on the southeast and the city of University Park on the east.

In May 2003, Greenway Parks became Conservation District No. 10. within the City of Dallas, designating it as a neighborhood with a distinct physical character, and requiring specific building and renovation standards in order to maintain its character.

In January 2008, Greenway Parks was officially entered into the National Register of Historic Places, one of only 24 such districts in the City. The certification notes many of the neighborhood's distinguishing characteristics, including 23 acres of parklands and open spaces that are privately and commonly owned by the neighborhood's homeowner's association. Most significant among these are the eight eponymous "greenway" parks which extend east-west between houses on Mockingbird, Montrose, Waneta, Nakoma, and Wenonah. "In contrast to the many late 19th. and early 20th century Dallas neighborhoods that were mostly bungalow suburbs that developed along streetcar routes, Greenway Parks was conceived of as a residential park, adapting American garden suburban planning practices and integrating shared green space."

== Education ==
=== Public schools ===
The neighborhood is served by Dallas Independent School District public schools:

- K. B. Polk Center for Academically Talented and Gifted (Pre-K-5) in neighboring Elm Thicket/North Park neighborhood
- Edward H Cary Middle School (6-8) in Walnut Hill neighborhood
- Thomas Jefferson High School (9-12) in Walnut Hill neighborhood

Sudie L. Williams Talented and Gifted Academy (located in the nearby Bluffview neighborhood) serves academically talented and gifted students in grades four through six (expanding to eighth grade by 2020). Admission to Williams is based on academic achievement and an application is required.

Henry W. Longfellow Career Exploration Academy (located next door within the Greenway Crest neighborhood) serves students in grades 6-8 selected through the magnet process. The students receive the same basic middle school program offered in all Dallas Independent School District middle schools. However, special focus is placed on the exploration and development of each student's interests and abilities.

=== Private schools ===
Nearby private schools include Good Shepherd Episcopal School (PreK-8), St. Mark's School of Texas (1-12), The Hockaday School (PreK-12, Girls), Greenhill School (PreK-12), The Episcopal School of Dallas (PreK-12), Jesuit College Preparatory School of Dallas (9-12, Boys), The Lamplighter School (PreK-4), Ursuline Academy of Dallas, and Christ the King Catholic School (K-8).

=== Colleges and universities ===
Greenway Parks is in the Dallas County Community College District, which offers academic, continuing education, and adult education programs through seven community colleges and 14 campuses in Dallas County.
