= The Lamplighter School =

Location
- Dallas, Texas; United States
- Coordinates: 32.9067°N 96.8199°W

Information
- Type: Private, Non-sectarian
- Motto: A student is not a vessel to be filled, but a lamp to be lighted.
- Established: 1953
- Catherine M. Rose Head of School: Dr. Joan Buchanan Hill
- Faculty: 49
- Enrollment: 450
- Campus: 12 acres (0.049 km^{2})
- Website: thelamplighterschool.org

The Lamplighter School is a nonsectarian co-ed day school located in Dallas, Texas, USA. The School offers grades Pre-K – 4 and is accredited by the Independent Schools Association of the Southwest.

== History ==
The Lamplighter School was founded in 1953 in a North Dallas farmhouse by Natalie Murray and Marieta "Sandy" Swain on what is now the Cooper Clinic campus. In 1969, The Lamplighter School moved to 11611 Inwood Road. The land which the current campus is on was part of 100 acres donated by Karl Hoblitzelle and the Hoblitzelle Foundation to The Hockaday School. Hockaday then leased the land to Lamplighter. In 2011 The Lamplighter School purchased the land from Hockaday for $12.5 million.

== Architecture ==
The campus of The Lamplighter School was originally designed by O’Neil Ford in the late 1960s. In the spring of 2014, The Lamplighter School undertook a new construction project that included an enlarged central landscape, and space for a new Innovation Lab and Teaching Barn. The approximately 10,000 square foot Eastin Family Innovation Lab serves the school’s 450 Pre-K through 4th-grade student population. The Innovation Lab includes a woodshop, robotics lab, and teaching kitchen.
